= 2026 AFC Beach Soccer Asian Cup =

ฟุตบอลชายหาดเอเชียนคัพ 2026

Tournament details
- Host country: Thailand
- City: Phang Nga
- Dates: 18–28 November
- Teams: 12 (from 1 confederation)
- Venue: 1 (in 1 host city)

Tournament statistics
- Matches played: 14
- Goals scored: 114 (8.14 per match)
- All statistics correct as of 22 November 2026.

The 2026 AFC Beach Soccer Asian Cup will be the 12th edition (5th official) of the AFC Beach Soccer Asian Cup, the premier beach soccer tournament contested by Asian men's national teams, organised by the Asian Football Confederation (AFC).

The tournament will take place on between 18 and 28 November 2026.

Iran are the two-time defending champions, having defeated Oman in the 2025 final.

== Teams ==
A total of 12 teams are competing in the tournament.

Team	Appearance	Previous best performance
Afghanistan	6th	Group stage (2013, 2017, 2019, 2023, 2025)
Bahrain	11th	Champions (2006)
Iran	12th	Champions (2013, 2017, 2023, 2025)
Iraq	7th	Group stage (2011, 2017, 2025)
Japan	12th	Champions (2009, 2011, 2019)
Lebanon	7th	4th place (2015, 2017)
Oman	9th	Champions (2015)
Saudi Arabia	4rd	4th place (2025)
Thailand (Hosts)	7th	Quarter-finals (2023, 2025)
United Arab Emirates	11th	Champions (2007, 2008)
Uzbekistan	7th	Quarter-finals (2011, 2015)
Vietnam	3rd	Group stage (2015, 2025)

== Draw ==
The draw took place on 10 September 2026 at 15:00 (UTC+8), at the AFC House in Kuala Lumpur, Malaysia.

The 12 teams will be drawn into three groups of four. The teams were seeded based on the performance of the last three editions. The hosts Thailand automatically seeded and assigned to Position A1 in the draw.

Pot 1	Pot 2	Pot 3	Pot 4
Thailand (Host) (5); Iran (1); Oman (2)	Japan (3); United Arab Emirates (4); Lebanon (6)	Saudi Arabia (7); Bahrain (8); Vietnam (9)	Afghanistan (10); Iraq (11); Uzbekistan (12)

== Squads ==
Each team named a preliminary squad of between 12 and 25 players. From the preliminary squad, the team named a final squad of 12 players (two of whom must be goalkeepers) no later than 10 days. Players in the final squad could be replaced by a player from the preliminary squad due to serious injury or illness up to 24 hours prior to kickoff of the team's first match (Regulations Article 23 and 24).

== Group stage ==
Points are earned for the following results:

- 3 points for a win in regulation time
- 2 points for a win in extra time
- 1 point for a win in a penalty shoot-out
- no points for a loss.

The top two teams from each group plus the two best third-placed teams will advance to the quarter final.

Tie-breaking criteria
The ranking of teams in the group stage was determined as follows:
1. Points in all group matches;
2. Points amongst tied teams;
3. Goal difference amongst tied teams;
4. Goals scored amongst tied teams;
5. If at least one team is ranked and two or more teams remain tied, reapply above criteria to exclusively tied teams;
6. Goal difference in all group matches;
7. Penalty shoot-out if last match is between two tied teams;
8. Fair play points;
9. Drawing of lots.

- All matches were held in Thailand.
- Times listed are (UTC+7).

=== Group A ===
Pos	Team	Pld	W	W+	WP	L	GF	GA	GD	Pts	Qualification
1	Japan	3	3	0	0	0	21	10	+11	9	Knockout stage
2	Bahrain	3	1	0	1	1	7	11	−4	4	Knockout stage
3	Thailand (H)	3	1	0	0	2	11	12	−1	3	Possible Knockout stage
4	Iraq	3	0	0	0	3	8	14	−6	0	

Source: AFC
Rules for classification: Tiebreakers
(H) Host
18 November 2026
17:00

Japan	8–3	Bahrain
Akaguma 1', 13', 16', 19'; Oba 1'; Kibune 12', 30'; Ozu 26' (pen.)	Report	Mohamed J. 1'; A. Hasanain 11'; Mohamed D. 13'

Memories Beach Arena, Phang Nga
Referee: Li Qibin (CHN), Mohd Amirul Aizat Bin Mohd Lodin (MAS)
18 November 2026
18:30

Thailand	5–4	Iraq
Ratthaphong N. 10', 24', 24'; Natee J. 19'; Murtadha 34' (o.g.)	Report	Murtadha 2'; A. Abdulnabi 12'; Sajjad 13'; Hayder 34' (pen.)

Memories Beach Arena, Phang Nga
Referee: Zukri Al Hinai (OMA), Hassan Abed Rabbo (LBN)

20 November 2026
17:00

Iraq	4–8	Japan
Hayder 25', 33'; Ali S. 29'; Ali Sh. 31'	Report	Akaguma 5', 23'; Ozu 8', 34'; Oba 10'; Otsuki 12'; Kawai 23'; Furusato 29'

Memories Beach Arena, Phang Nga
Referee: Mohd Amirul Aizat Bin Mohd Lodin (MAS), Lai Chengyang (CHN)
20 November 2026
18:30

Bahrain	3–3 (a.e.t.)	Thailand
Mohamed D. 11'; Mahran M. 26'; H. Al-Doseri 34'	Report	Suriya B. 6'; Ratthaphong N. 24', 26'
Penalties
Isa Ahmed (penalty scored); A. Hasanain (penalty scored); Mohamed D. (penalty scored); H. Al-Doseri (penalty missed); Mohamed J. (penalty scored)	4–2	(penalty scored) Poramaet M.; (penalty scored) Masayuki Y.; (penalty missed) Jake S.; (penalty missed) Watchara L.

Memories Beach Arena, Phang Nga
Referee: Samer Karram (SYR), Nayim Kosimov (UZB)

22 November 2026
17:00

Bahrain	1–0	Iraq
Ahmed A. 3'	Report

Memories Beach Arena, Phang Nga
Referee: Lai Chengyang (CHN), Zukri Al Hinai (OMA)
22 November 2026
18:30

Thailand	3–5	Japan
Masayuki Y. 4'; Ratthaphong N. 24', 36'	Report	Oba 5'; Morioka 22'; Otsuki 27'; Ozu 34'; Matsuda 36'

Memories Beach Arena, Phang Nga
Referee: Nayim Kosimov (UZB), Timur Gulmyradov (TKM)

=== Group B ===
Pos	Team	Pld	W	W+	WP	L	GF	GA	GD	Pts	Qualification
1	Iran (A)	2	2	0	0	0	19	4	+15	6	Knockout stage
2	Lebanon (A)	2	2	0	0	0	12	4	+8	6	Knockout stage
3	Vietnam	2	0	0	0	2	6	17	−11	0	Possible Knockout stage
4	Afghanistan	2	0	0	0	2	2	14	−12	0	

Updated to match(es) played on 21 November 2026. Source: AFC
Rules for classification: Tiebreakers
(A) Advances to a further round
19 November 2026
14:00

Iran	9–2	Afghanistan
Mokhtari 2'; Sobhan 5', 34'; Dayeri 11', 15', 21'; Movahed 29' (pen.); Mirshekari 33'; Seyed 36'	Report	M. Bahaduri 20', 21'

Memories Beach Arena, Phang Nga
Referee: Suparith Udma (THA), Suwat Wongsuwan (THA)
19 November 2026
17:00

Lebanon	7–4	Vietnam
M. Al Saleh 1', 4', 35'; A. Hamed 7'; A. El Khatib 11'; H. Fattal 12'; A. Hallal 22'	Report	H. Minh Tuấn 9'; A Na Lức 17'; M. Văn Mạnh 18' (pen.); T. Ngọc Bảo 31'

Memories Beach Arena, Phang Nga
Referee: Fallah Al Balushi (OMA), Ibrahim Al-Raeesi (UAE)

21 November 2026
14:00

Afghanistan	0–5	Lebanon
	Report	A. Al Saleh 5'; M. Merhi 12', 33'; M. Al Saleh 36'; A. Hamed 36'

Memories Beach Arena, Phang Nga
Referee: Rimpei Takahashi (JPN), Fallah Al Balushi (OMA)
21 November 2026
17:00

Vietnam	2–10	Iran
N. Tấn Tài 17'; P. Trường Du 23'	Report	Masoumi 4', 34'; Movahed 6'; Mokhtari 7'; Shir 9'; Saeid 16'; Davoud 16', 34', 35'; Mirshekari 30'

Memories Beach Arena, Phang Nga
Referee: Abdulaziz Abdullah (KUW), Waleed Mohamed (BHR)

23 November 2026
14:00

Iran	v	Lebanon

Memories Beach Arena, Phang Nga
Referee: Waleed Mohamed (BHR), Samer Karram (SYR)
23 November 2026
17:00

Vietnam	v	Afghanistan

Memories Beach Arena, Phang Nga
Referee: Ibrahim Al-Raeesi (UAE), Abdulla Saleh (BHR)

=== Group C ===
Pos	Team	Pld	W	W+	WP	L	GF	GA	GD	Pts	Qualification
1	Oman (A)	2	2	0	0	0	15	3	+12	6	Knockout stage
2	United Arab Emirates	2	1	0	0	1	6	4	+2	3	Knockout stage
3	Saudi Arabia	2	0	0	1	1	6	9	−3	1	Possible Knockout stage
4	Uzbekistan	2	0	0	0	2	1	12	−11	0	

Updated to match(es) played on 21 November 2026. Source: AFC
Rules for classification: Tiebreakers
(A) Advances to a further round
19 November 2026
15:30

Oman	9–0	Uzbekistan
Khalid 4'; Majid 8'; Abdullah 14'; Uvraimov 16' (o.g.); Nooh 21'; Sami 24', 28'; Musallam 26', 30'	Report

Memories Beach Arena, Phang Nga
Referee: Mehran Khalili (IRN), Javad Fallahi (IRN)
19 November 2026
18:30

United Arab Emirates	3–3 (a.e.t.)	Saudi Arabia
Humaid 11'; Rashed 32', 36'	Report	Khalid 13'; Salman 18'; Waleed 35'
Penalties
Ahmed B. (penalty missed); Kamal (penalty scored); Rashed (penalty missed); Abbas (penalty scored); Abdulla (penalty missed)	2–3	(penalty missed) Hassan; (penalty scored) Naif; (penalty missed) Ramzy; (penalty scored) Majed; (penalty scored) Al-Hamami

Memories Beach Arena, Phang Nga
Referee: Timur Gulmyradov (TKM), Akram Mahdi (IRQ)

21 November 2026
15:30

Uzbekistan	1–3	United Arab Emirates
Khalimov 34'	Report	Rashed 15'; Abdulla 25'; Abbas 31'

Memories Beach Arena, Phang Nga
Referee: Abdulla Saleh (BHR), Li Qibin (CHN)
21 November 2026
18:30

Saudi Arabia	3–6	Oman
Majed 4'; Khalid 14'; Waleed 34'	Report	Majid 2'; Khalid 3', 14', 22'; Musallam 13', 18'

Memories Beach Arena, Phang Nga
Referee: Suwat Wongsuwan (THA), Muhammad Syahir Bin Shaharul Nizam (MAS)

23 November 2026
15:30

Oman	v	United Arab Emirates

Memories Beach Arena, Phang Nga
Referee: Muhammad Syahir Bin Shaharul Nizam (MAS), Abdulaziz Abdullah (KUW)
23 November 2026
18:30

Saudi Arabia	v	Uzbekistan

Memories Beach Arena, Phang Nga
Referee: Hassan Abed Rabbo (LBN), Suparith Udma (THA)

=== Ranking of third-placed teams ===
Pos	Grp	Team	Pld	W	W+	WP	L	GF	GA	GD	Pts	Qualification
1	A	Thailand	3	1	0	0	2	11	12	−1	3	Knockout stage
2	C	Saudi Arabia	2	0	0	1	1	6	9	−3	1	Knockout stage
3	B	Vietnam	2	0	0	0	2	6	17	−11	0	

Updated to match(es) played on 22 November 2026. Source:
Rules for classification: 1) Points; 2) Total goal difference; 3) Total goals scored; 4) Disciplinary points; 5) Drawing of lots (Regulations Article 10.6).

== Knockout stage ==
=== Bracket ===
Quarter-finals
25 November – Phang Nga
Japan
3rd Group B/C
25 November – Phang Nga
1st Group B
2nd Group C
25 November – Phang Nga
1st Group C
3rd Group A/B
25 November – Phang Nga
Bahrain
2nd Group B

Semi-finals
27 November – Phang Nga
Winner quarter-final 1
Winner quarter-final 2
27 November – Phang Nga
Winner quarter-final 3
Winner quarter-final 4

Final
28 November – Phang Nga
Winner semi-final 1
Winner semi-final 2
Third place match
28 November – Phang Nga
Loser semi-final 1
Loser semi-final 2

=== Quarter-finals ===
25 November 2026
14:00

1B	QF2	2C

Memories Beach Arena, Phang Nga
25 November 2026
15:30

1C	QF3	3A/B

Memories Beach Arena, Phang Nga
25 November 2026
17:00

Bahrain	QF4	2B

Memories Beach Arena, Phang Nga
25 November 2026
18:30

Japan	QF1	3B/C

Memories Beach Arena, Phang Nga

=== Semi-finals ===
Winners qualified for the 2027 FIFA Beach Soccer World Cup.

27 November 2026
17:00

Winner quarter-final 1	SF1	Winner quarter-final 2

Memories Beach Arena, Phang Nga
27 November 2026
18:30

Winner quarter-final 3	SF2	Winner quarter-final 4

Memories Beach Arena, Phang Nga

=== Third place match ===
Winners qualified for the 2027 FIFA Beach Soccer World Cup.

28 November 2026
17:00

Loser semi-final 1	v	Loser semi-final 2

Memories Beach Arena, Phang Nga

=== Final ===
28 November 2026
18:30

Winner semi-final 1	v	Winner semi-final 2

Memories Beach Arena, Phang Nga

== Goalscorers ==
There have been 114 goals scored in 14 matches, for an average of 8.14 goals per match (as of 22 November 2026).

6 goals

- (Japan) Takuya Akaguma

5 goals

- (Thailand) Ratthaphong Nadee

3 goals

- (Iran) Reza Dayeri
- (Iraq) Hayder Abbas
- (Japan) Ozu Moreira
- (Lebanon) Mohammad Al Saleh

2 goals

- (Afghanistan) Mohammad Bahaduri
- (Bahrain) Mohamed Darwish
- (Iran) Sobhan Faleh
- (Japan) Yuki Kibune
- (Japan) Takaaki Oba
- (Oman) Musallam Al Araimi
- (Oman) Sami Al Bulushi
- (United Arab Emirates) Rashed Eid

1 goal

- (Bahrain) Ali Hasanain
- (Bahrain) Husain Al-Doseri
- (Bahrain) Mohamed Jaafar
- (Bahrain) Mahran Mohamed
- (Iran) Seyedmahdi Mirjalili
- (Iran) Ali Mirshekari
- (Iran) Movahed Mohammadpour
- (Iran) Mohammadali Mokhtari
- (Iraq) Ali Abdulnabi
- (Iraq) Murtadha Qasim
- (Iraq) Sajjad Sahal
- (Iraq) Ali Sayyid
- (Iraq) Ali Shakir
- (Japan) Takeru Furusato
- (Japan) Yusuke Kawai
- (Japan) Yohei Otsuki
- (Lebanon) Ahmad El Khatib
- (Lebanon) Haitham Fattal
- (Lebanon) Ali Hallal
- (Lebanon) Ahmad Hamed
- (Oman) Majid Al Affari
- (Oman) Khalid Al-Oraimi
- (Oman) Abdullah Al Sauti
- (Oman) Nooh Al Zadjali
- (Saudi Arabia) Salman Al-Rashdi
- (Saudi Arabia) Waleed Al-Youbi
- (Saudi Arabia) Khalid Mofareh
- (Thailand) Natee Jeepon
- (Thailand) Suriya Boridet
- (United Arab Emirates) Humaid Jamal
- (Vietnam) A Na Lức
- (Vietnam) Hồ Minh Tuấn
- (Vietnam) Mai Văn Mạnh
- (Vietnam) Trần Ngọc Bảo

1 own goal

- (Iraq) Murtadha Qasim (against Thailand)
- (Uzbekistan) Amal Uvraimov (against Oman)
