= Vietnam national beach soccer team =

Vietnam
- Nickname: Những chiến binh sao vàng (Golden Star Warriors)
- Association: Vietnam Football Federation (VFF)
- Confederation: AFC (Asia)
- Sub-confederation: AFF (Southeast Asia)
- Head coach: Mai Văn Đức
- Captain: Trần Vĩnh Phong
- Top scorer: Bùi Trần Tuấn Anh (23 goals)
- Home stadium: Various
- FIFA code: VIE
- BSWW ranking: 73 ▲3 (2 September 2026)
First colours
Second colours

First international
- Bahrain 3–0 Vietnam (Bali, Indonesia, 18 October 2008)

Biggest win
- Vietnam 13–0 Timor-Leste (Da Nang, Vietnam, 2 December 2016)

Biggest defeat
- Vietnam 2–10 Iran (Phang Nga, Thailand, 21 November 2026)

AFC Beach Soccer Asian Cup
- Appearances: 3 (first in 2015)
- Best result: Group stage (2015, 2025)

Asian Beach Games
- Appearances: 4 (first in 2008)
- Best result: Fourth place (2014)

AFF Beach Soccer Championship
- Appearances: 2 (first in 2014)
- Best result: (gold) Champions (2018)
Medal record
Men's Beach Soccer
Representing Vietnam
AFF Beach Soccer Championship
Silver medal – second place	2014 Malaysia	Team
Gold medal – first place	2018 Vietnam	Team
- Website: www.vff.org.vn/vi/tin-tuc-482

The Vietnam national beach soccer team (Vietnamese: Đội tuyển bóng đá bãi biển quốc gia Việt Nam) represents Vietnam in international beach soccer competitions and is controlled by the Vietnam Football Federation (VFF), the governing body for football in the Vietnam.

== Competitive records ==
=== FIFA Beach Soccer World Cup ===
FIFA Beach Soccer World Cup Record
Year	Result	Position	Pld	W	W+	L	GF	GA
(Brazil) 1995	did not enter							
(Brazil) 1996	did not enter							
(Brazil) 1997	did not enter							
(Brazil) 1998	did not enter							
(Brazil) 1999	did not enter							
(Brazil) 2000	did not enter							
(Brazil) 2001	did not enter							
(Brazil) 2002	did not enter							
(Brazil) 2003	did not enter							
(Brazil) 2004	did not enter							
(Brazil) 2005	did not enter							
(Brazil) 2006	did not enter							
(Brazil) 2007	did not enter							
(France) 2008	did not enter							
(United Arab Emirates) 2009	did not enter							
(Italy) 2011	did not enter							
(French Polynesia) 2013	did not enter							
(Portugal) 2015	did not qualify							
(The Bahamas) 2017	did not enter							
(Paraguay) 2019	did not enter							
(Russia) 2021	did not enter							
(United Arab Emirates) 2023	did not enter							
(Seychelles) 2025	did not qualify							
Total	Best: None	0/23	0	0	0	0	0	0

=== AFC Beach Soccer Asian Cup ===
AFC Beach Soccer Asian Cup record
Year	Result	Position	Pld	W	WE	WP	L	GF	GA
(United Arab Emirates) 2006	Did not enter								
(United Arab Emirates) 2007	Did not enter								
(United Arab Emirates) 2008	Did not enter								
(United Arab Emirates) 2009	Did not enter								
(Oman) 2011	Did not enter								
(Qatar) 2013	Did not enter								
(Qatar) 2015	Group stage	14th	3	0	0	0	3	11	14
(United Arab Emirates) 2017	Did not enter								
(Thailand) 2019	Did not enter								
(Thailand) ~~2021~~	Canceled due to COVID-19 pandemic								
(Thailand) 2023	Did not enter								
(Thailand) 2025	Group stage	13th	3	0	1	0	2	6	12
(Thailand) 2026	To be determined								
Total	Group stage	2/11	6	0	1	0	5	17	26

AFC Beach Soccer Asian Cup history
Season	Round	Opponent	Scores	Result	Venue
2015	Group stage	China	5–5 a.e.t (pens. 2–3)	Loss	Doha, Qatar
2015	Group stage	Japan	2–3	Loss	Doha, Qatar
2015	Group stage	Kuwait	4–6	Loss	Doha, Qatar
2025	Group stage	Oman	1–7	Loss	Pattaya, Thailand
2025	Group stage	Bahrain	4–2 (a.e.t)	Won	Pattaya, Thailand
2025	Group stage	Malaysia	1–3	Loss	Pattaya, Thailand
2026	Group stage	Lebanon	4–7	Loss	Phang Nga, Thailand
2026	Group stage	Iran	2–10	Loss	Phang Nga, Thailand
2026	Group stage	Afghanistan	–		Phang Nga, Thailand

=== Asian Beach Games ===
Asian Beach Games record
Year	Result	Position	Pld	W	W+	L	GF	GA
(Indonesia) 2008	Group stage	9th	3	2	0	1	12	12
(Oman) 2010	Group stage	13th	3	0	0	3	9	17
(China) 2012	Group stage	9th	3	1	0	2	7	10
(Thailand) 2014	4th place	4th	6	2	1	3	20	26
(Vietnam) 2016	Quarter-Finals	5th	3	1	1	1	15	8
(China) 2026	Did not enter							
Total	4th place	5/6	18	6	2	10	64	73

Asian Beach Games history
Season	Round	Opponent	Scores	Result	Venue
2008	Group stage	Bahrain	0–3	Loss	Bali, Indonesia
2008	Group stage	South Korea	4–3	Won	Bali, Indonesia
2008	Group stage	Kuwait	8–6	Won	Bali, Indonesia
2010	Group stage	China	2–5	Loss	Muscat, Oman
2010	Group stage	Bahrain	4–5 (a.e.t)	Loss	Muscat, Oman
2010	Group stage	Palestine	3–7	Loss	Muscat, Oman
2012	Group stage	Palestine	2–6	Loss	Haiyang, China
2012	Group stage	Afghanistan	4–3	Won	Haiyang, China
2012	Group stage	China	1–1 a.e.t (pens. 2–3)	Loss	Haiyang, China
2014	Group stage	Kuwait	6–2	Won	Phuket, Thailand
2014	Group stage	Qatar	3–1	Won	Phuket, Thailand
2014	Group stage	Thailand	4–5	Loss	Phuket, Thailand
2014	Quarter-finals	Oman	3–3 a.e.t (pens. 5–4)	Won	Phuket, Thailand
2014	Semi-finals	Japan	2–7	Loss	Phuket, Thailand
2014	Bronze medal match	United Arab Emirates	2–8	Loss	Phuket, Thailand
2016	Group stage	Laos	12–3	Won	Da Nang, Vietnam
2016	Group stage	Thailand	0–2	Loss	Da Nang, Vietnam
2016	Quarter-finals	Lebanon	3–3 a.e.t (pens. 3–4)	Loss	Da Nang, Vietnam

=== ASEAN Beach Soccer Championship ===
ASEAN Beach Soccer Championship Record
Year	Result	Pos	Pld	W	W+	L	GF	GA
(Malaysia) 2014	Runners-up	2nd	5	3	0	2	24	15
(Indonesia) 2018	Champions	1st	4	3	0	1	20	18
(Thailand) 2019	Runners-up	2nd	4	2	0	2	17	19
(Thailand) 2022	Did not enter							
(Thailand) 2026	To be determined							
Total	2 titles	3/4	11	9	0	2	63	26

AFC Beach Soccer Asian Cup history
Season	Round	Opponent	Scores	Result	Venue
2014	Group stage	Thailand	3–4	Loss	Kuantan, Malaysia
2014	Group stage	Indonesia	6–2	Won	Kuantan, Malaysia
2014	Group stage	(Malaysia) FELDA	8–1	Won	Kuantan, Malaysia
2014	Semi-finals	Laos	3–2	Won	Kuantan, Malaysia
2014	Final	Malaysia	4–6	Loss	Kuantan, Malaysia
2018	Group stage	Malaysia	3–2	Won	Bali, Indonesia
2018	Group stage	Indonesia	3–2	Won	Bali, Indonesia
2018	Group stage	Thailand	4–9	Loss	Bali, Indonesia
2018	Group stage	Timor-Leste	4–1	Won	Bali, Indonesia
2018	Final	Thailand	6–4	Won	Bali, Indonesia
2019	Group stage	China	7–5	Won	Chonburi, Thailand
2019	Group stage	Malaysia	5–3	Won	Chonburi, Thailand
2019	Group stage	Afghanistan	3–7	Loss	Chonburi, Thailand
2019	Group stage	Thailand	2–4	Loss	Chonburi, Thailand

== Schedules and results ==
All times are UTC+7 (local times, if different, are in parentheses).

Win Draw Loss

=== 2026 ===
19 November Asian Cup GS	Lebanon	7–4	Vietnam	Phang Nga, Thailand
17:00 UTC+7

21 November Asian Cup GS	Vietnam	2–10	Iran	Phang Nga, Thailand
17:00 UTC+7

23 November Asian Cup GS	Vietnam	v	Afghanistan	Phang Nga, Thailand
17:00 UTC+7

== Players ==
=== Current squad ===
The following 14 players were named for the 2025 AFC Beach Soccer Asian Cup.
Caps and goals correct as of 27 March 2025.

Head coach: (Vietnam) Mai Văn Đức

No.	Pos.	Player	Date of birth (age)	Caps	Goals	Club
1	GK	Nguyễn Hữu Ân		0	0	(Vietnam Football Federation) Đà Nẵng
12	GK	Nguyễn Anh Quang		2	0	(Vietnam Football Federation) Khánh Hoà
5	DF	Mai Văn Mãnh		3	1	(Vietnam Football Federation) Đà Nẵng
3	DF	Hồ Quốc Hưng		2	0	(Vietnam Football Federation) Đà Nẵng
	DF	Lê Thái Nguyễn		0	0	(Vietnam Football Federation) Đà Nẵng
11	DF	Nguyễn Hồng Quân		1	0	(Vietnam Football Federation) Khánh Hòa
8	MF	Trần Kim Trung		0	0	(Vietnam Football Federation) Đà Nẵng
4	MF	Mai Đức Rim		0	0	(Vietnam Football Federation) Huế
9	MF	Võ Hoàng Phú Quí		0	0	(Vietnam Football Federation) Khánh Hoà
	MF	Trần Trọng Hoàng		0	0	(Vietnam Football Federation) Bình Định
10	MF	Phạm Trường Dũ Anh		1	1	(Vietnam Football Federation) Bình Định
6	FW	Trần Ngọc Bảo		3	0	(Vietnam Football Federation) Đà Nẵng
2	FW	Phan Đạt		3	3	(Vietnam Football Federation) Đà Nẵng
7	FW	Trần Vĩnh Phong		0	0	(Vietnam Football Federation) Đà Nẵng

=== Recent call-ups ===
The following players have been called up within the last 12 months.

No.	Pos.	Player	Date of birth (age)	Caps	Goals	Club
	GK	Ngô Quốc Cường	28 July 1989 (age 37)	0	4	(Vietnam Football Federation) Đà Nẵng
	MF	Mai Bá Cường	8 December 1986 (age 39)	0	2	(Vietnam Football Federation) Bình Thuận
	DF	Huỳnh Ngọc Cường	22 October 1988 (age 38)	0	2	(Vietnam Football Federation) Khánh Hòa

== Coaching staff ==
Position	Name
Manager	(Vietnam) Mai Văn Đức
Head coach	(Vietnam) Trương Công Tuân
Goalkeeping coach	(Vietnam) Kiều Minh Văn
Doctor	(Vietnam) Lê Xuân An

== Sponsorship ==
Primary sponsors includes:

- Yanmar
- Grand Sport
- Suzuki Vietnam
- Sony Vietnam
- Z.com
- VPMilk
- Acecook

Local sponsor includes:

- Eximbank
- Petro Vietnam
- Hoa Sen Group
- Kova Paint
- Next Media
- Dong Luc Group
- Viettel Mobile
- Cuulong Steel
- Thai Son Nam Group
- Canh Buom Do Group
- Huu Lien A Chau Joint-Stock Company

== Coaches ==
Name	Nationality	Period	Tournament
Đặng Quốc Hùng	Vietnam	2014	2014 AFF Beach Soccer Championship: (silver) Runner-up; 2014 Asian Beach Games: Fourth place 2015 AFC Beach Soccer Championship: Group stage
Trương Công Tuân	Vietnam	2016	2016 Asian Beach Games: Quarter-Final; 2018 AFF Beach Soccer Championship: (gold) Champions
Mai Văn Đức	Vietnam	2025	

== Honours ==
- AFC Beach Soccer Asian Cup

Appearances (2): 2015, 2025

- Asian Beach Games

Fourth place (1): 2014
Appearances (5): 2008, 2010, 2012, 2014, 2016

- AFF Beach Soccer Championship

(gold) Champions (1): 2018
(silver) Runner-up (2): 2014, 2019
Appearances (3): 2014, 2018, 2019

== See also ==
- Football in Vietnam
- Vietnam Football Federation
- Vietnam national football team
- Vietnam national under-23 football team
- Vietnam national under-19 football team
- Vietnam national under-16 football team
- Vietnam national futsal team
