= 2025 AFC Beach Soccer Asian Cup =

ฟุตบอลชายหาดเอเชียนคัพ 2025

Tournament details
- Host country: Thailand
- City: Pattaya
- Dates: 20–30 March
- Teams: 16 (from 1 confederation)
- Venue: Jomtien Beach Arena (in 1 host city)

Final positions
- Champions: Iran (4th title)
- Runners-up: Oman
- Third place: Japan
- Fourth place: Saudi Arabia

Tournament statistics
- Matches played: 32
- Goals scored: 242 (7.56 per match)
- Top scorer: (Iran) Ali Mirshekari (12 goals)
- Best player: (Iran) Ali Mirshekari
- Best goalkeeper: (Iran) Seyed mahdi Mirjalili

The 2025 AFC Beach Soccer Asian Cup is the eleventh edition (4th official) of the AFC Beach Soccer Asian Cup (previously the AFC Beach Soccer Championship, before rebranding in 2021), the premier beach soccer tournament contested by Asian men's national teams, organised by the Asian Football Confederation (AFC).

The tournament is taking place in Pattaya, Thailand. The championship also acts as the qualification tournament for Asian teams for the 2025 FIFA Beach Soccer World Cup, to be held in Seychelles. The top three teams qualify for the World Cup.

Iran are the defending champions.

== Teams ==
A total of 16 teams are competing in the tournament.

Team	Appearance	Previous best performance
Afghanistan	5th	Group stage (2013, 2017, 2019, 2023)
Bahrain	10th	Champions (2006)
China	11th	4th place (2006, 2008)
Iran	11th	Champions (2013, 2017, 2023)
India	2nd	Group stage (2007)
Indonesia	3rd	Group stage (2011, 2023)
Iraq	6th	Group stage (2011, 2017)
Japan	11th	Champions (2009, 2011, 2019)
Kuwait	5th	Quarter-finals (2023)
Lebanon	6th	4th place (2015, 2017)
Malaysia	4th	Quarter-finals (2019)
Oman	8th	Champions (2015)
Saudi Arabia	3rd	Group stage (2013, 2023)
Thailand (hosts)	6th	Quarter-finals (2023)
Vietnam	2nd	Group stage (2015)
United Arab Emirates	10th	Champions (2007, 2008)

== Draw ==
The draw of the tournament was held on 19 December 2024 in Kuala Lumpur, Malaysia. The 16 teams were drawn into four groups of four teams. The teams were seeded according to their performance in the 2023 AFC Beach Soccer Asian Cup, with the hosts Thailand automatically seeded and assigned to Position A1 in the draw.

Pot 1	Pot 2	Pot 3	Pot 4
Thailand (hosts); Iran (1); Japan (2); Oman (3)	United Arab Emirates (4); Kuwait (6); Bahrain (7); China (8)	Saudi Arabia (9); Lebanon (10); Afghanistan (13); Malaysia (15)	Indonesia (16); India (—); Iraq (—); Vietnam (—)

== Group stage ==
Points are earned for the following results:

- 3 points for a win in regulation time
- 2 points for a win in extra time
- 1 point for a win in a penalty shoot-out
- no points for a loss.

The top two teams from each group advance to the quarter-finals.

Tie-breaking criteria
The ranking of teams in the group stage was determined as follows:
1. Points in all group matches;
2. Points amongst tied teams;
3. Goal difference amongst tied teams;
4. Goals scored amongst tied teams;
5. If at least one team is ranked and two or more teams remain tied, reapply above criteria to exclusively tied teams;
6. Goal difference in all group matches;
7. Penalty shoot-out if last match is between two tied teams;
8. Fair play points;
9. Drawing of lots.

All times are local, ICT (UTC+7).

=== Group A ===
Pos	Team	Pld	W	WE	WP	L	GF	GA	GD	Pts	Qualification
1	Thailand (H)	3	2	1	0	0	12	7	+5	8	Advance to knockout stage
2	Lebanon	3	2	0	0	1	15	10	+5	6	Advance to knockout stage
3	Kuwait	3	1	0	0	2	11	11	0	3	
4	India	3	0	0	0	3	3	13	−10	0	

Source: AFC
Rules for classification: Tiebreakers
(H) Host
20 March 2025
17:00

Kuwait	4–5	Lebanon
M. Hajeyah 7', 14'; A. Al-Salem 14'; J. Al-Sabea 21'	Report	M. Al Saleh 1'; Mohama. Haidar 7'; A. El Khatib 7', 23'; M. Al Zein 29'

Jomtien Beach Arena, Pattaya
20 March 2025
20:30

Thailand	3–0	India
J. Stoten 21'; Ratthaphong N. 29'; Komkrit N. 33'	Report

Jomtien Beach Arena, Pattaya
Referee: Javad Fallahi (Iran)

22 March 2025
17:00

India	2–4	Kuwait
Satish Subhash 10'; Rohith Yesudas 27'	Report	M. Hajeyah 10', 30', 36'; W. Al-Shammari 20'

Jomtien Beach Arena, Pattaya
Referee: Muhammad Syahir Shaharul (Malaysia)
22 March 2025
20:30

Lebanon	4–5	Thailand
M. Al Saleh 8', 15', 19'; Mohama. Haidar 30'	Report	Komkrit N. 4', 11', 36'; Ratthaphong N. 22'; Natee J. 23'

Jomtien Beach Arena, Pattaya
Referee: Lai Chengyang (China)

24 March 2025
17:00

Lebanon	6–1	India
M. Al Saleh 9'; Mohama. Haidar 10'; A. El Khatib 22'; M. Ossman 23'; M. Choker 32'; M. Merhi 34'	Report	Amit Godara 18'

Jomtien Beach Arena, Pattaya
Referee: Timur Gulmyradov (Turkmenistan)
24 March 2025
20:30

Thailand	4–3 (a.e.t.)	Kuwait
Natee J. 1'; Komkrit N. 3'; Ratthaphong N. 9'; Suriya B. 39'	Report	O. Al-Failakawi 28'; M. Hajeyah 30' (pen.); M. Al-Shafei 34'

Jomtien Beach Arena, Pattaya
Referee: Nawaf Hussein (United Arab Emirates)

=== Group B ===
Pos	Team	Pld	W	WE	WP	L	GF	GA	GD	Pts	Qualification
1	Japan	3	3	0	0	0	15	6	+9	9	Advance to knockout stage
2	Saudi Arabia	3	2	0	0	1	10	12	−2	6	Advance to knockout stage
3	China	3	0	1	0	2	7	11	−4	2	
4	Iraq	3	0	0	0	3	7	10	−3	0	

Source: AFC
Rules for classification: Tiebreakers
20 March 2025
15:30

Japan	4–3	Iraq
O. Moreira 3', 18', 20'; T. Oba 32'	Report	Murtadha Qasim 3'; Hayder Abbas 4'; Sajjad Sahal 28'

Jomtien Beach Arena, Pattaya
Referee: Suparith Udma (Thailand)
20 March 2025
18:30

China	3–5	Saudi Arabia
Wang Jun 6'; Guo Wei 17'; Liu Yisi 24'	Report	W. Al-Youbi 10'; Q. Dibaji 16'; M. Shamhani 24', 33'; O. Kark 36'

Jomtien Beach Arena, Pattaya
Referee: Hassen Abed Rabbo (Lebanon)

22 March 2025
15:30

Iraq	2–3 (a.e.t.)	China
Sajjad Sahal 4'; Hayder Abbas 23'	Report	Wang Jun 12'; Hao Minhui 25'; Liu Yisi 38'

Jomtien Beach Arena, Pattaya
Referee: Waleed Abdulkarim (Bahrain)
22 March 2025
18:30

Saudi Arabia	2–7	Japan
R. Dakman 8'; K. Matsuda 34' (o.g.)	Report	O. Moreira 1'; T. Akaguma 2', 34'; R. Tsuboya 3'; M. Ota 5'; M. Suzuki 11'; K. Matsuda 28'

Jomtien Beach Arena, Pattaya
Referee: Suwat Wongsuwan (Thailand)

24 March 2025
15:30

Saudi Arabia	3–2	Iraq
M. Shamhani 12'; A. Al-Hamami 20'; W. Al-Youbi 28'	Report	Hayder Abbas 19'; Hussein Khudhair 33'

Jomtien Beach Arena, Pattaya
Referee: Mehran Khalili (Iran)
24 March 2025
18:30

Japan	4–1	China
T. Oba 18'; T. Akaguma 21'; K. Matsumoto 28'; Y. Kawai 36'	Report	O. Moreira 31' (o.g.)

Jomtien Beach Arena, Pattaya
Referee: Zukri Al-Hinai (Oman)

=== Group C ===
Pos	Team	Pld	W	WE	WP	L	GF	GA	GD	Pts	Qualification
1	Iran	3	3	0	0	0	30	5	+25	9	Advance to knockout stage
2	United Arab Emirates	3	2	0	0	1	16	6	+10	6	Advance to knockout stage
3	Indonesia	3	1	0	0	2	9	22	−13	3	
4	Afghanistan	3	0	0	0	3	5	27	−22	0	

Source: AFC
Rules for classification: Tiebreakers
21 March 2025
15:30

Iran	12–2	Indonesia
I Ketut Sudiartawan 2' (o.g.); M. Shirmohammadi 6', 25', 30'; M. Masoumizadeh 14'; S. Mirjalili 15'; M. Mohammadpour 24'; M. Mokhtari 31', 33'; M. Nazarzadeh 32'; S. Dastan 35'; A. Mirshekari 36'	Report	Agung Teguh 22' (pen.); Angga Pratama 36'

Jomtien Beach Arena, Pattaya
Referee: Timur Gulmyradov (Turkmenistan)
21 March 2025
18:30

United Arab Emirates	7–1	Afghanistan
Abdulla A. Al-Blooshi 10', 12'; Waleed B. Salem 17', 36'; Mohammad O. Ali 19'; Walid M. Mohammadi 19'; Abbas A. Daryaei 32'	Report	O. Haidari 9'

Jomtien Beach Arena, Pattaya
Referee: Zukri Al-Hinai (Oman)

23 March 2025
15:30

Indonesia	1–6	United Arab Emirates
Demon Pradik 13'	Report	Walid M. Mohammadi 3'; Abdulla A. Al-Blooshi 3', 33'; Rashed E. Yaqoub 13'; Rashid O. Ali 19'; Ahmed B. Salem 22'

Jomtien Beach Arena, Pattaya
Referee: Suwat Wongsuwan (Thailand)
23 March 2025
18:30

Afghanistan	0–14	Iran
	Report	S. Nazem 2'; M. Mohammadpour 3'; A. Rezaei 12', 17'; A. Mirshekari 18', 29', 33'; S. Piramoun 20'; M. Masoumizadeh 24', 30'; M. Shirmohammadi 31', 35', 36'; R. Amiri Zadeh 32'

Jomtien Beach Arena, Pattaya
Referee: Yuichi Hatano (Japan)

25 March 2025
15:30

Afghanistan	4–6	Indonesia
O. Homauni 7', 31'; M. F. Haidari 18'; M. A. Bahaduri 30'	Report	Agung Teguh 7', 12', 23'; Demon Pradik 19'; Asep Triwahono 25'; Gede Sentanu 31'

Jomtien Beach Arena, Pattaya
Referee: Amirul Aizat Bin Mohd Lodin (Malaysia)
25 March 2025
18:30

Iran	4–3	United Arab Emirates
R. Amiri Zadeh 2'; M. Masoumizadeh 9'; A. Mirshekari 30'; M. Mohammadpour 35'	Report	Ali M. Mohammadi 5'; Abdulla A. Al-Blooshi 20'; Waleed B. Salem

Jomtien Beach Arena, Pattaya
Referee: Fallah Al-Balushi (Oman

=== Group D ===
Pos	Team	Pld	W	WE	WP	L	GF	GA	GD	Pts	Qualification
1	Oman	3	3	0	0	0	18	5	+13	9	Advance to knockout stage
2	Bahrain	3	1	0	0	2	7	12	−5	3 (Note: Head-to-head: Bahrain 4–3 Malaysia)	Advance to knockout stage
3	Malaysia	3	1	0	0	2	9	11	−2	3	
4	Vietnam	3	0	1	0	2	6	12	−6	2	

Source: AFC
Rules for classification: Tiebreakers
Notes:
21 March 2025
17:00

Oman	7–1	Vietnam
A. Al-Sauti 1', 20'; S. Al-Bulushi 6'; Mush. Al-Araimi 14'; A. Al-Owaisi 30'; Musa. Al-Araimi 36', 36'	Report	Phan Đạt 25'

Jomtien Beach Arena, Pattaya
Referee: Nawaf Hussein (United Arab Emirates)
21 March 2025
20:30

Bahrain	4–3	Malaysia
Samoul Al-Noor 11'; Sayed Mohamed Abbas 19'; Faris Iman M. 22' (o.g.); Isa Muthanna 36'	Report	Hafizal M. 12'; Norazman A. 24'; Ridhwan Z. 32'

Jomtien Beach Arena, Pattaya
Referee: Abdulaziz Abdullah (Kuwait)

23 March 2025
17:00

Vietnam	4–2 (a.e.t.)	Bahrain
Trần Ngọc Bảo 23'; Phan Đạt 32', 38'; Mai Văn Mãnh 37'	Report	Samoul Al-Noor 25', 34'

Jomtien Beach Arena, Pattaya
Referee: Akram Mahdi Saleh (Iraq)
23 March 2025
20:30

Malaysia	3–6	Oman
Hafizal M. 18', 31'; Qushairie A. 19'	Report	A. Al-Sauti 3'; Mush. Al-Araimi 11'; Musa. Al-Araimi 24'; Y. Al-Muraiki 25', 28'; M. Al-Araimi 36'

Jomtien Beach Arena, Pattaya
Referee: Nayim Kosimov (Uzbekistan)

25 March 2025
17:00

Malaysia	3–1	Vietnam
Hafizal M. 21', 36'; Faris Iman M. 26'	Report	Phạm Trường Dũ 34'

Jomtien Beach Arena, Pattaya
Referee: Abdulaziz Abdullah (Kuwait)
25 March 2025
20:30

Oman	5–1	Bahrain
S. Al-Bulushi 5'; Y. Al-Muraiki 12', 19', 22'; Musa. Al-Araimi 29'	Report	H. Al-Doseri 36'

Jomtien Beach Arena, Pattaya
Referee: Mehran Khalili (Iran)

== Knockout stage ==
=== Bracket ===
Quarter-finals
26 March – Pattaya
Thailand	3
Saudi Arabia	4
27 March – Pattaya
Iran	11
Bahrain	0
27 March – Pattaya
Oman	7
United Arab Emirates	2
26 March – Pattaya
Japan	8
Lebanon	3

Semi-finals
29 March – Pattaya
Saudi Arabia	0
Iran	6
29 March – Pattaya
Oman	3
Japan	2

Final
30 March – Pattaya
Iran	8
Oman	1
Third place
30 March – Pattaya
Saudi Arabia	1
Japan	3

=== Quarter-finals ===
26 March 2025
18:30

Thailand	3–4	Saudi Arabia
Natee J. 11'; Suriya B. 21'; Ratthaphong N. 32'	Report	M. Shamhani 6', 27'; O. Kark 31'; A. Al-Hamami 33'

Jomtien Beach Arena, Pattaya
Referee: Nawaf Hussein (United Arab Emirates)

26 March 2025
20:30

Japan	8–3	Lebanon
T. Akaguma 11'; T. Oba 12', 14', 23'; R. Tsuboya 15', 36'; Y. Kawai 22'; T. Uesato 35'	Report	M. Merhi 14'; M. Al Saleh 25', 36'

Jomtien Beach Arena, Pattaya
Referee: Suparith Udma (Thailand)

27 March 2025
18:30

Iran	11–0	Bahrain
M. Masoumizadeh 4', 19'; A. Mirshekari 11', 24', 28'; M. Mokhtari 12'; S. Nazem 21', 27'; A. Rezaei 26'; Piramoun 26'; M. Nazarzadeh 35'	Report

Jomtien Beach Arena, Pattaya
Referee: Fallah Al-Balushi (Oman)

27 March 2025
20:30

Oman	7–2	United Arab Emirates
S. Al-Bulushi 6'; Musa. Al-Araimi 11', 32', 36'; Y. Al-Muraiki 12'; S. Al-Oraimi 14'; N. Al-Zadjali 24'	Report	Rashed E. Yaqoub 2'; Rashid O. Ali 11'

Jomtien Beach Arena, Pattaya
Referee: Nayim Kosimov (Uzbekistan)

=== Semi-finals ===
Winners qualified for the 2025 FIFA Beach Soccer World Cup.

29 March 2025
18:30

Saudi Arabia	0–6	Iran
	Report	S. Dastan 7', 31'; S. Nazem 9'; A. Mirshekari 22', 36'; M. Masoumizadeh 27'

Jomtien Beach Arena, Pattaya
Referee: Hassan Abed Rabbo (Lebanon)

29 March 2025
20:30

Japan	2–3	Oman
C. Eguro 17'; R. Tsuboya 21'	Report	Y. Al-Muraiki 8'; A. Al-Sauti 27', 28'

Jomtien Beach Arena, Pattaya
Referee: Ibrahim Al-Raeesi (United Arab Emirates)

=== Third-place match ===
Winners qualified for the 2025 FIFA Beach Soccer World Cup.

30 March 2025
18:30

Saudi Arabia	1–3	Japan
M. Shamhani 16'	Report	T. Oba 12'; C. Eguro 19'; O. Moreira 36'

Jomtien Beach Arena, Pattaya
Referee: Nayim Kosimov (Uzbekistan)

=== Final ===
30 March 2025
20:30

Iran	8–1	Oman
M. Shirmohammadi 11'; R. Amiri Zadeh 15'; M. Mohammadpour 17'; S. Nazem 18'; A. Mirshekari 20', 23'; M. Mokhtari 33', 36'	Report	S. Al-Bulushi 20'

Jomtien Beach Arena, Pattaya
Referee: Yuichi Hatano (Japan)

== Goalscorers ==
There were 242 goals scored in 32 matches, for an average of 7.56 goals per match.

12 goals

- (Iran) Ali Mirshekari

7 goals

- (Iran) Mohammad Masoumizadeh
- (Iran) Mahdi Shirmohammadi
- (Lebanon) Mohammad Al Saleh
- (Oman) Musallam Al-Araimi
- (Oman) Yahya Al-Muraiki

6 goals

- (Japan) Takaaki Oba
- (Kuwait) Mohammed Hajeyah
- (Saudi Arabia) Majed Shamhani

5 goals

- (Iran) Mohammadali Mokhtari
- (Iran) Seyed Ali Nazem
- (Japan) Ozu Moreira
- (Malaysia) Hafizal Mohamad
- (Oman) Abdullah Al-Sauti
- (Thailand) Komkrit Nanan
- (United Arab Emirates) Abdulla Al-Blooshi

4 goals

- (Indonesia) Agung Teguh
- (Iran) Movahed Mohammadpour
- (Japan) Takuya Akaguma
- (Japan) Ryota Tsuboya
- (Oman) Sami Al-Bulushi
- (Thailand) Ratthaphong Nadee

3 goals

- (Bahrain) Samoul Al-Noor
- (Iran) Reza Amiri Zadeh
- (Iran) Seyedmohammad Dastan
- (Iran) Abbas Rezaei
- (Iraq) Hayder Abbas
- (Lebanon) Ahmad El Khatib
- (Lebanon) Mohamad Haidar
- (Thailand) Natee Jeepon
- (United Arab Emirates) Waleed Salem
(Vietnam) Phan Đạt

2 goals

- (Afghanistan) Omid Homauni
- (China) Liu Yisi
- (China) Wang Jun
- (Indonesia) Demon Pradik Pratama
- (Iran) Mohammadali Nazarzadeh
- (Iran) Saeid Piramoun
- (Iraq) Sajjad Sahal
- (Japan) Chikara Eguro
- (Japan) Yusuke Kawai
- (Lebanon) Mohamad Merhi
- (Oman) Mushel Al-Araimi
- (Saudi Arabia) Ahmed Al-Hamami
- (Saudi Arabia) Waleed Al-Youbi
- (Saudi Arabia) Omar Kark
- (Thailand) Suriya Boridet
- (United Arab Emirates) Rashid Obaid Ali
- (United Arab Emirates) Walid Mohammadi
- (United Arab Emirates) Rashed Yaqoub

1 goal

- (Afghanistan) Mohammad Akbar Bahaduri
- (Afghanistan) Mohammad Fahim Haidari
- (Afghanistan) Omid Haidari
- (Bahrain) Sayed Mohamed Abbas
- (Bahrain) Husain Al-Doseri
- (Bahrain) Isa Muthanna
- (China) Guo Wei
- (China) Hao Minhui
- (India) Amit Godara
- (India) Rohith Yesudas
- (India) Satish Subhash
- (Indonesia) Angga Pratama
- (Indonesia) Asep Triwahono
- (Indonesia) Gede Sentanu
- (Iran) Seyedmahdi Mirjalili
- (Iraq) Hussein Khudhair
- (Iraq) Murtadha Qasim
- (Japan) Kosuke Matsuda
- (Japan) Ken Matsumoto
- (Japan) Masato Ota
- (Japan) Masato Suzuki
- (Japan) Takumi Uesato
- (Kuwait) Omar Al-Failakawi
- (Kuwait) Jassim Al-Sabea
- (Kuwait) Abdulaziz Al-Salem
- (Kuwait) Meshal Al-Shafei
- (Kuwait) Wayel Al-Shammari
- (Lebanon) Moustafa Al Zein
- (Lebanon) Mohamed Choker
- (Lebanon) Mohamad Ossman
- (Malaysia) Faris Iman Mahadi
- (Malaysia) Norazman A Bakar
- (Malaysia) Qushairie Asaari
- (Malaysia) Ridhwan Zainal
- (Oman) Mandhar Al-Araimi
- (Oman) Salim Al-Oraimi
- (Oman) Ahmed Al-Owaisi
- (Oman) Nooh Al-Zadjali
- (Saudi Arabia) Ramzi Dakman
- (Saudi Arabia) Qasem Dibaji
- (Thailand) Jake Stoten
- (United Arab Emirates) Mohammad Obaid Ali
- (United Arab Emirates) Abbas Daryaei
- (United Arab Emirates) Ali Mohammadi
- (United Arab Emirates) Ahmed Salem
- (Vietnam) Mai Văn Mãnh
- (Vietnam) Trần Ngọc Bảo
- (Vietnam) Phạm Trường Dũ

1 own goal

- (Indonesia) I Ketut Sudiartawan (against Iran)
- (Japan) Kosuke Matsuda (against Saudi Arabia)
- (Japan) Ozu Moreira (against China)
- (Malaysia) Faris Iman Mahadi (against Bahrain)

Source: AFC

== Final ranking ==
Pos	Team	Pld	W	WE	WP	L	GF	GA	GD	Pts
1	Iran	6	6	0	0	0	55	6	+49	18
2	Oman	6	5	0	0	1	29	17	+12	15
3	Japan	6	5	0	0	1	28	13	+15	15
4	Saudi Arabia	6	3	0	0	3	15	24	−9	9
5	Thailand (H)	4	2	1	0	1	15	11	+4	8
6	Lebanon	4	2	0	0	2	18	18	0	6
7	United Arab Emirates	4	2	0	0	2	18	13	+5	6
8	Bahrain	4	1	0	0	3	7	23	−16	3
9	Kuwait	3	1	0	0	2	11	11	0	3
10	Malaysia	3	1	0	0	2	9	11	−2	3
11	Indonesia	3	1	0	0	2	9	22	−13	3
12	China	3	0	1	0	2	7	11	−4	2
13	Vietnam	3	0	1	0	2	6	12	−6	2
14	Iraq	3	0	0	0	3	7	10	−3	0
15	India	3	0	0	0	3	3	13	−10	0
16	Afghanistan	3	0	0	0	3	5	27	−22	0

Source: AFC
Rules for classification: 5th-8th: 1) Goal difference in quarter-finals; 2) Goals scored in quarter-finals. 9th-16th: 1) Position in group, 2) Goal difference; 3) Goals scored.
(H) Host

== Awards ==
- Most Valuable Player: (Iran) Ali Mirshekari
- Best Goalkeeper: (Iran) Seyed mahdi Mirjalili

2025 AFC Beach Soccer Championship winners
Iran
4th title

== Qualified teams for FIFA Beach Soccer World Cup ==
The following teams qualified for the world cup.

Team	Qualified on	Previous appearances in FIFA Beach Soccer World Cup only FIFA era (since 2005)
Iran	29 March 2025	8 (2006, 2007, 2008, 2011, 2013, 2015, 2017, 2024)
Oman	29 March 2025	5 (2011, 2015, 2019, 2021, 2024)
Japan	30 March 2025	12 (2005, 2006, 2007, 2008, 2009, 2011, 2013, 2015, 2017, 2019, 2021, 2024)

• Bold indicates champions for that year.
• Italic indicates hosts for that year.
