= Philippines national beach soccer team =

Philippines
- Nickname: The Dolphins
- Association: Philippines Football Federation; Beach Football Association of the Philippines
- Confederation: AFC (Asia)
- FIFA code: PHI
- BSWW ranking: NR (2 September 2026)

First international
- Japan 16–0 Philippines (Dubai, United Arab Emirates; 22 May 2006)

Biggest win
- Myanmar 3–4 Philippines (Da Nang, Vietnam; 7 December 2016)

Biggest defeat
- Philippines 0–20 Iran (Doha, Qatar; 22 January 2013)

The Philippines national beach soccer team represents the Philippines in international beach soccer competitions and is controlled by the Beach Football Association of the Philippines, an affiliate member of the Philippines Football Federation, the governing body for football in the Philippines. They made its first international debut at the 2006 AFC Beach Soccer Championship.

== History ==
In January 2026, the Philippine Football Federation, through its 2024-25 report, promised the formation of a Beach Soccer National Team.

== Squad ==
As of October 2014

Note: Flags indicate national team as defined under FIFA eligibility rules; some limited exceptions apply. Players may hold more than one non-FIFA nationality.

No.	Pos.	Nation	Player
1	GK		Rory Stephen Mansbridge
2			Maverick Madayag
3			Alejandro Baldo Jr.
4			Randy Salisad
5			Ali Mahmoud Ramos
6			Rowell Dalida Abello

No.	Pos.	Nation	Player
7			Jovanie Saludares Simpron
8			Ahmad Diab Ibrahim Cebrero
9			Marc Andrew Santos
10			Rodolfo Vicente Del Rosario
11			Jhomar Almento
12			Salem Attar

== Tournament records ==
=== Asian Cup ===
Asian Cup Record
Year	Round	Pld	W	W+	L	GF	GA	GD
(United Arab Emirates) 2006	6th place	2	0	0	2	3	24	–21
(United Arab Emirates) 2007	did not enter							
(United Arab Emirates) 2008	6th place	2	0	0	2	4	13	–9
(United Arab Emirates) 2009	did not enter							
(Oman) 2011	did not enter							
(Qatar) 2013	16th place	5	0	0	5	6	53	–47
(Qatar) 2015	did not enter							
(United Arab Emirates) 2017	did not enter							
Total	Best: 6th place	9	0	0	9	13	90	–77

=== ASEAN Championship ===
Asean Championship Record
Year	Round	Pld	W	W+	L	GF	GA	GD
(Malaysia) 2014	Group Stage	3	0	0	3	6	20	–14
(Indonesia) 2018								
Total	2/2	6	1	0	5	17	33	–16
