= 2019 AFC Beach Soccer Championship =

ฟุตบอลชายหาดชิงแชมป์เอเชีย 2019

Tournament details
- Host country: Thailand
- City: Pattaya
- Dates: 7–17 March
- Teams: 15 (from 1 confederation)
- Venue: 1 (in 1 host city)

Final positions
- Champions: Japan (3rd title)
- Runners-up: United Arab Emirates
- Third place: Oman
- Fourth place: Palestine

Tournament statistics
- Matches played: 29
- Goals scored: 211 (7.28 per match)
- Attendance: 7,810 (269 per match)
- Top scorer: (Japan) Ozu Moreira (9 goals)
- Best player: (Japan) Ozu Moreira
- Fair play award: United Arab Emirates

The 2019 AFC Beach Soccer Championship was the ninth edition of the AFC Beach Soccer Championship (second official), the premier beach soccer tournament contested by Asian men's national teams, organised by the Asian Football Confederation (AFC).

The tournament took place in Pattaya, Thailand between 7–17 March 2019. The championship also acts as the qualification tournament for Asian teams to the 2019 FIFA Beach Soccer World Cup in Paraguay; the top three teams qualify.

Iran were the defending champions but failed to defend the title after losing Japan in the quarter-final. Japan becomes the champion after beating UAE in final, becoming the first team to win the tournament three times.

== Teams ==
A total of 15 teams entered the tournament.

Team	Appearance	Previous best performance
Afghanistan	3rd	6th place (2017)
Bahrain	8th	Champions (2006)
China	9th	4th place (2006, 2008)
Iran	9th	Champions (2013, 2017)
Iraq	5th	9th place (2011, 2017)
Japan	9th	Champions (2009, 2011)
Kuwait	3rd	9th place (2015)
Kyrgyzstan	1st	Debut
Lebanon	4th	4th place (2015, 2017)
Malaysia	2nd	8th place (2017)
Oman	6th	Champions (2015)
Palestine	2nd	6th place (2013)
Qatar	4th	11th place (2017)
Thailand (hosts)	4th	10th place (2017)
United Arab Emirates	8th	Champions (2007, 2008)

== Draw ==
The draw of the tournament was held on 3 December 2018 in Pattaya, Thailand. The 15 teams were drawn into three groups of four teams and one group of three teams. The teams were seeded according to their performance in the 2017 AFC Beach Soccer Championship final tournament, with the hosts Thailand automatically seeded and assigned to Position A1 in the draw.

Pot 1	Pot 2	Pot 3	Pot 4 (unranked)
1. Thailand (hosts); 2. Iran; 3. United Arab Emirates; 4. Japan	5. Lebanon; 6. Oman; 7. Bahrain; 8. Afghanistan	9. Malaysia; 10. Iraq; 11. China; 12. Qatar	Palestine; Kuwait; Kyrgyzstan

== Squads ==
Each team must register a squad of 12 players, minimum two of whom must be goalkeepers (Regulations Articles 26.1 and 26.2).

== Group stage ==
Each team earns three points for a win in regulation time, two points for a win in extra time, one point for a win in a penalty shoot-out, and no points for a defeat. The top two teams of each group advanced to the quarter-finals.

Tiebreakers

Teams are ranked according to points, and if tied on points, the following tiebreaking criteria are applied, in the order given, to determine the rankings (Regulations Article 10.5):

1. Points in head-to-head matches among tied teams;
2. Goal difference in head-to-head matches among tied teams;
3. Goals scored in head-to-head matches among tied teams;
4. If more than two teams are tied, and after applying all head-to-head criteria above, a subset of teams are still tied, all head-to-head criteria above are reapplied exclusively to this subset of teams;
5. Goal difference in all group matches;
6. Goals scored in all group matches;
7. Penalty shoot-out if only two teams are tied and they met in the last round of the group;
8. Disciplinary points (yellow card = 1 point, red card as a result of two yellow cards = 3 points, direct red card = 3 points, yellow card followed by direct red card = 4 points);
9. Drawing of lots.

All times are local, ICT (UTC+7).

Schedule
Matchday	Dates	Matches (Groups A–C)	Matches (Groups D)
Matchday 1	7–8 March 2019	1 v 4, 2 v 3	3 v 1
Matchday 2	9–10 March 2019	4 v 2, 3 v 1	2 v 3
Matchday 3	11–12 March 2019	1 v 2, 3 v 4	1 v 2

=== Group A ===
Pos	Team	Pld	W	W+	WP	L	GF	GA	GD	Pts	Qualification
1	Palestine	3	3	0	0	0	14	9	+5	9	Knockout stage
2	Malaysia	3	1	0	0	2	12	13	−1	3 (Note: Head-to-head result: Malaysia 5–4 Thailand.)	Knockout stage
3	Thailand (H)	3	1	0	0	2	8	10	−2	3	
4	Afghanistan	3	0	1	0	2	5	7	−2	2	

Source: AFC
Rules for classification: Group stage tiebreakers
(H) Host
Notes:
7 March 2019
17:30

Afghanistan	3–2 (a.e.t.)	Malaysia
Qaderi 12'; Alavi 25'; Mohammadi 37'	Report	Nazri 22'; Qushairie 32'

Main Arena, Pattaya
Attendance: 150
Referee: Fallah Al-Balushi (Oman)
7 March 2019
20:30

Thailand	2–5	Palestine
Komkrit 11'; Tanandon 19'	Report	Hassan 17', 24'; Atiya 19'; Al-Bawwab 21'; Kittin 33' (o.g.)

Main Arena, Pattaya
Attendance: 350
Referee: Yuichi Hatano (Japan)

9 March 2019
17:30

Palestine	3–2	Afghanistan
Al-Arawi 20'; Hassan 32'; Al-Neirab 35'	Report	Mohammadi 12', 29'

Main Arena, Pattaya
Attendance: 70
Referee: Ebrahim Akbarpour (Iran)
9 March 2019
20:30

Malaysia	5–4	Thailand
Ridhwan 3' (pen.), 10'; Hasrol 11', 25'; Qushairie 24'	Report	Tanandon 20', 34'; Thakorn 29'; Komkrit 35'

Main Arena, Pattaya
Attendance: 450
Referee: Waleed Abdulkarim (Bahrain)

11 March 2019
19:00

Malaysia	5–6	Palestine
Ridhwan 2'; Zaharim 6', 19'; Qushairie 17'; Shaladan 35' (o.g.)	Report	Al-Bawwab 1', 19', 25'; Al-Neirab 16', 19'; Abuobayda 33'

Main Arena, Pattaya
Attendance: 250
Referee: Yuichi Hatano (Japan)
11 March 2019
20:30

Thailand	2–0	Afghanistan
Thakorn 16'; Tanandon 28'	Report

Main Arena, Pattaya
Attendance: 450
Referee: Fallah Al-Balushi (Oman)

=== Group B ===
Pos	Team	Pld	W	W+	WP	L	GF	GA	GD	Pts	Qualification
1	United Arab Emirates	3	3	0	0	0	15	5	+10	9	Knockout stage
2	Lebanon	3	2	0	0	1	18	8	+10	6	Knockout stage
3	China	3	1	0	0	2	14	14	0	3	
4	Kyrgyzstan	3	0	0	0	3	6	26	−20	0	

Source: AFC
Rules for classification: Group stage tiebreakers
7 March 2019
16:00

Lebanon	5–3	China
Abdullah 13', 29'; Fattal 16', 30'; Matar 28'	Report	Han Xuegeng 5'; Liu Haoran 13'; Cai Weiming 33'

Main Arena, Pattaya
Attendance: 100
Referee: Bakhtiyor Namazov (Uzbekistan)
7 March 2019
19:00

United Arab Emirates	6–1	Kyrgyzstan
K. Ali 1'; Muntaser 7'; Karim 20'; W. Mohammad 23'; Mohamed 35' (pen.); W. Beshr 36'	Report	Duisheev 16'

Main Arena, Pattaya
Attendance: 200
Referee: Abdulla Saleh (Bahrain)

9 March 2019
16:00

Kyrgyzstan	2–11	Lebanon
Duisheev 11'; A. Uulu 31'	Report	Abdullah 5', 26'; Kadi 6', 34'; Fattal 8', 31'; Merhi 22', 27', 34'; Jalal 31'; Matar 31'

Main Arena, Pattaya
Attendance: 100
Referee: Turki Al-Salehi (Oman)
9 March 2019
19:00

China	2–6	United Arab Emirates
Guo Xuchenjiao 3'; Liu Yisi 36'	Report	Karim 9'; A. Ali 9', 24'; W. Mohammad 26'; K. Ali 30'; A. Beshr 32'

Main Arena, Pattaya
Attendance: 200
Referee: Makoto Sato (Japan)

11 March 2019
16:00

United Arab Emirates	3–2	Lebanon
W. Beshr 11', 20'; Muntaser 13'	Report	Abdullah 6'; Zein El Dine 11'

Main Arena, Pattaya
Attendance: 70
Referee: Bakhtiyor Namazov (Uzbekistan)
11 March 2019
17:30

China	9–3	Kyrgyzstan
Han Xuegeng 12' (pen.), 15', 30'; Bai Fan 18'; Liu Haoran 19', 30'; Liu Yisi 24'; Cai Weiming 24', 27'	Report	Diushenov 5'; Almazbekov 23', 32'

Main Arena, Pattaya
Attendance: 200
Referee: Abdulla Saleh (Bahrain)

=== Group C ===
Pos	Team	Pld	W	W+	WP	L	GF	GA	GD	Pts	Qualification
1	Japan	3	3	0	0	0	21	4	+17	9	Knockout stage
2	Bahrain	3	2	0	0	1	12	10	+2	6	Knockout stage
3	Kuwait	3	1	0	0	2	11	14	−3	3	
4	Qatar	3	0	0	0	3	4	20	−16	0	

Source: AFC
Rules for classification: Group stage tiebreakers
8 March 2019
17:30

Bahrain	5–2	Qatar
Al-Abdulla 5', 32'; Al-Yaqoobi 7', 31'; Mubarak 28'	Report	Al-Khlif 13'; Samy 29'

Main Arena, Pattaya
Attendance: 100
Referee: Hassan Abed Rabbo (Lebanon)
8 March 2019
20:30

Japan	8–1	Kuwait
Moreira 8', 12'; Oba 11', 25'; Yamauchi 13', 13', 23'; Komaki 31'	Report	Al-Hamad 13'

Main Arena, Pattaya
Attendance: 220
Referee: Wan Mohamad Tarmizi (Malaysia)

10 March 2019
17:30

Kuwait	2–5	Bahrain
Hajeyah 19'; Al-Yaqoub 31'	Report	Zubayel 5'; Jamal 20', 30'; Al-Hamad 30' (o.g.); Al-Yaqoobi 36'

Main Arena, Pattaya
Attendance: 200
Referee: Li Qibin (China)
10 March 2019
20:30

Qatar	1–7	Japan
Al-Khlif 11'	Report	Moreira 11', 22'; Yamauchi 11', 24'; Akaguma 15'; Okuyama 18', 20'

Main Arena, Pattaya
Attendance: 300
Referee: Suwat Wongsuwan (Thailand)

12 March 2019
17:30

Japan	6–2	Bahrain
Moreira 2', 19'; Akaguma 16'; Okuyama 18', 18'; Yamauchi 26'	Report	Al-Mahjoob 4'; Jamal 22' (pen.)

Main Arena, Pattaya
Attendance: 200
Referee: Ibrahim Al-Raeesi (United Arab Emirates)
12 March 2019
20:30

Qatar	1–8	Kuwait
Al-Khater 26'	Report	Al-Yaqoub 7', 20', 34'; Al-Hamad 15', 30', 35'; Hajeyah 16'; Abdullah 18'

Main Arena, Pattaya
Attendance: 100
Referee: Suhaimi Mat Hassan (Malaysia)

=== Group D ===
Pos	Team	Pld	W	W+	WP	L	GF	GA	GD	Pts	Qualification
1	Oman	2	2	0	0	0	10	6	+4	6	Knockout stage
2	Iran	2	1	0	0	1	8	6	+2	3	Knockout stage
3	Iraq	2	0	0	0	2	5	11	−6	0	

Source: AFC
Rules for classification: Group stage tiebreakers
8 March 2019
19:00

Iraq	2–5	Iran
Salah 3'; Naji 27'	Report	Mirshekari 9'; Akbari 12'; Behzadpour 18'; Ahmadzadeh 28'; Mokhtari 33'

Main Arena, Pattaya
Attendance: 200
Referee: Shao Liang (China)

10 March 2019
19:00

Oman	6–3	Iraq
Salim 2', 15'; Al-Oraimi 4', 12'; Al Bulushi 18'; Al Qasmi 28'	Report	Hasan 5'; Qasim 33'; Ahmed 36'

Main Arena, Pattaya
Attendance: 350
Referee: Ebrahim Al-Mansoori (United Arab Emirates)

12 March 2019
19:00

Iran	3–4	Oman
Masoumizadeh 4', 27'; Ahmadzadeh 36'	Report	Mu. Al Araimi 7'; Al-Sinani 12'; Al Bulushi 30'; Y. Al Araimi 34'

Main Arena, Pattaya
Attendance: 420
Referee: Shao Liang (China)

== Knockout stage ==
In the knockout stage, extra time and penalty shoot-out were used to decide the winner if necessary, except for the third place match where penalty shoot-out (no extra time) was used to decide the winner if necessary (Regulations Articles 14.1 and 15.1).

=== Bracket ===
Quarter-finals
14 March
Palestine	4
Lebanon	3
14 March
Japan (a.e.t.)	3
Iran	2
14 March
United Arab Emirates	8
Malaysia	1
14 March
Oman	5
Bahrain	3

Semi-finals
15 March
Palestine	0
Japan	6
15 March
United Arab Emirates	3
Oman	2

Final
17 March
Japan (p)	2 (3)
United Arab Emirates	2 (1)
Third place match
17 March
Palestine	2 (1)
Oman (p)	2 (2)

=== Quarter-finals ===
14 March 2019
16:00

Oman	5–3	Bahrain
Al-Oraimi 1', 27'; Mu. Al Araimi 4'; Al Bulushi 9'; Y. Al Araimi 34'	Report	Darwish 1'; Jamal 9'; Y. Al Araimi 14' (o.g.)

Main Arena, Pattaya
Attendance: 200
Referee: Yuichi Hatano (Japan)

14 March 2019
17:30

Japan	3–2 (a.e.t.)	Iran
Yamauchi 21'; Akaguma 26', 38'	Report	Shirmohammadi 9'; Moradi 10'

Main Arena, Pattaya
Attendance: 350
Referee: Turki Al-Salehi (Oman)

14 March 2019
19:00

United Arab Emirates	8–1	Malaysia
Al-Jasmi 3'; Mohamed 9', 34'; K. Ali 10'; A. Mohammad 24'; W. Mohammad 28', 36'; Jamal 35'	Report	Hasrol 21'

Main Arena, Pattaya
Attendance: 300
Referee: Li Qibin (China)

14 March 2019
20:30

Palestine	4–3	Lebanon
Al-Arawi 13'; Abuobayda 20'; Al-Bawwab 28'; Al-Neirab 35' (pen.)	Report	Fattal 11', 28'; Merhi 18'

Main Arena, Pattaya
Attendance: 150
Referee: Ebrahim Al-Mansoori (United Arab Emirates)

=== Semi-finals ===
Winners qualify for 2019 FIFA Beach Soccer World Cup.

15 March 2019
17:00

United Arab Emirates	3–2	Oman
Muntaser 6'; A. Ali 20'; W. Beshr 34'	Report	Al Zadjali 19'; Al Bulushi 28'

Main Arena, Pattaya
Attendance: 300
Referee: Bakhtiyor Namazov (Uzbekistan)

15 March 2019
19:00

Palestine	0–6	Japan
	Report	Akaguma 6'; Moreira 12', 30'; Oba 14'; Yamauchi 35'; Matsuo 36'

Main Arena, Pattaya
Attendance: 480
Referee: Abdulla Saleh (Bahrain)

=== Third place match ===
Winner qualifies for 2019 FIFA Beach Soccer World Cup.

17 March 2019
17:00

Palestine	2–2	Oman
Abuobayda 11'; Al-Arawi 20'	Report	Al Bulushi 28', 31'
Penalties
Al-Neirab (penalty missed); Al-Bawwab (penalty scored); Atiya (penalty missed)	1–2	(penalty missed) Salim; (penalty scored) Al-Oraimi; (penalty scored) Mu. Al Araimi

Main Arena, Pattaya
Attendance: 350
Referee: Suhaimi Mat Hassan (Malaysia)

=== Final ===
17 March 2019
19:00

Japan	2–2 (a.e.t.)	United Arab Emirates
Komaki 7'; Moreira 16'	Report	A. Mohammad 22', 24'
Penalties
Moreira (penalty scored); Yamauchi (penalty scored); Oba (penalty scored)	3–1	(penalty scored) Mohamed; (penalty missed) W. Mohammad

Main Arena, Pattaya
Attendance: 1,000
Referee: Turki Al-Salehi (Oman)

== Winners ==
2019 AFC Beach Soccer Championship
(Japan)
Japan
Third title

== Awards ==
The following awards were given at the conclusion of the tournament:

Top Goalscorer	Most Valuable Player	Fair Play award
(Japan) Ozu Moreira	(Japan) Ozu Moreira	United Arab Emirates

== Goalscorers ==
There were 211 goals scored in 29 matches, for an average of 7.28 goals per match.

9 goals

- (Japan) Ozu Moreira

8 goals

- (Japan) Shusei Yamauchi

6 goals

- (Lebanon) Haitham Fattal
- (Oman) Sami Al Bulushi

5 goals

- (Japan) Takuya Akaguma
- (Lebanon) Hussein Abdullah
- (Palestine) Maisara Al-Bawwab

4 goals

- (Bahrain) Rashad Jamal
- (China) Han Xuegeng
- (Japan) Masanori Okuyama
- (Kuwait) Abdullatif Al-Hamad
- (Kuwait) Abdulrahman Al-Yaqoub
- (Lebanon) Mohamad Merhi
- (Oman) Khalid Al-Oraimi
- (Palestine) Mahmoud Al-Neirab
- (Thailand) Tanandon Praracha
- (United Arab Emirates) Waleed Beshr
- (United Arab Emirates) Walid Mohammad

3 goals

- (Afghanistan) Sami Mohammadi
- (Bahrain) Salman Al-Yaqoobi
- (China) Cai Weiming
- (China) Liu Haoran
- (Japan) Takaaki Oba
- (Malaysia) Hasrol Ali
- (Malaysia) Qushairie Asaari
- (Malaysia) Ridhwan Zainal
- (Palestine) Islam Abuobayda
- (Palestine) Fadi Al-Arawi
- (Palestine) Mohammed Hassan
- (United Arab Emirates) Abbas Ali
- (United Arab Emirates) Kamal Ali
- (United Arab Emirates) Ali Mohammad
- (United Arab Emirates) Hasham Muntaser

2 goals

- (Bahrain) Abdulla Al-Abdulla
- (China) Liu Yisi
- (Iran) Mohammad Ahmadzadeh
- (Iran) Mohammad Masoumizadeh
- (Japan) Masayuki Komaki
- (Kuwait) Mohammed Hajeyah
- (Kyrgyzstan) Erbol Almazbekov
- (Kyrgyzstan) Kairat Duisheev
- (Lebanon) Hassan Kadi
- (Lebanon) Mechleb Matar
- (Malaysia) Zaharim Yusof
- (Oman) Mushel Al Araimi
- (Oman) Yahya Al Araimi
- (Oman) Abdullah Salim
- (Qatar) Srhan Al-Khlif
- (Thailand) Komkrit Nanan
- (Thailand) Thakorn Wikayaphan
- (United Arab Emirates) Ali Karim
- (United Arab Emirates) Haitham Mohamed

1 goal

- (Afghanistan) Shahab Alavi
- (Afghanistan) Raof Qaderi
- (Bahrain) Ebrahim Al-Mahjoob
- (Bahrain) Mohamed Darwish
- (Bahrain) Ayoob Mubarak
- (Bahrain) Abbas Zubayel
- (China) Bai Fan
- (China) Guo Xuchenjiao
- (Iran) Amir Akbari
- (Iran) Hamid Behzadpour
- (Iran) Ali Mirshekari
- (Iran) Mohammad Mokhtari
- (Iran) Mohammad Moradi
- (Iran) Mahdi Shirmohammadi
- (Iraq) Ali Ahmed
- (Iraq) Salah Hasan
- (Iraq) Murtadha Qasim
- (Iraq) Mohammed Naji
- (Iraq) Sajjad Salah
- (Japan) Naoya Matsuo
- (Kuwait) Ali Abdullah
- (Kyrgyzstan) Urmat Diushenov
- (Kyrgyzstan) Aktilek Abdykalyi Uulu
- (Lebanon) Abbas Zein El Dine
- (Lebanon) Sameh Jalal
- (Malaysia) Nazri Sulaiman
- (Oman) Ishaq Al Qasmi
- (Oman) Jalal Al-Sinani
- (Oman) Nooh Al Zadjali
- (Palestine) Alaa Atiya
- (Qatar) Fawaz Al-Khater
- (Qatar) Hazem Samy
- (United Arab Emirates) Mohamed Al-Jasmi
- (United Arab Emirates) Ahmed Beshr
- (United Arab Emirates) Humaid Jamal
- (United Arab Emirates) Haitham Mohamed

1 own goal

- (Kuwait) Abdullatif Al-Hamad (against Bahrain)
- (Oman) Yahya Al Araimi (against Bahrain)
- (Palestine) Yousef Shaladan (against Malaysia)
- (Thailand) Kittin Lorjanad (against Palestine)

== Qualified teams for FIFA Beach Soccer World Cup ==
The following three teams from AFC qualify for the 2019 FIFA Beach Soccer World Cup.

Team	Qualified on	Previous appearances in FIFA Beach Soccer World Cup^{1} only FIFA era (since 2005)
United Arab Emirates	15 March 2019	5 (2007, 2008, 2009, 2013, 2017)
Japan	15 March 2019	9 (2005, 2006, 2007, 2008, 2009, 2011, 2013, 2015, 2017)
Oman	17 March 2019	2 (2011, 2015)

^{1} Bold indicates champions for that year. Italic indicates hosts for that year.
