= 2014 AFF Beach Soccer Championship =

2014 AFF Kejohanan Bola Sepak Pantai

Tournament details
- Host country: Malaysia
- City: Pahang
- Dates: 21–31 October
- Teams: 8 (from 1 confederation)
- Venue: 1 (in 1 host city)

Final positions
- Champions: Malaysia (1st title)
- Runners-up: Vietnam
- Third place: Thailand
- Fourth place: Laos

Tournament statistics
- Matches played: 16
- Goals scored: 127 (7.94 per match)
- Top scorer: (Vietnam) Bùi Trần Tuấn Anh (15 goals)

The 2014 AFF Beach Soccer Championship, also known as the 2014 AFF FELDA Beach Soccer Championship for sponsorship reasons, was the first beach soccer championship for Southeast Asia, held from 21–31 October 2014, in Kuantan, Pahang, Malaysia. Seven teams from the AFF participated in the inaugural event, plus a team fielded by sponsors, Federal Land Development Authority.

== Participants ==
- Indonesia
- Laos
- Malaysia (hosts)
- Myanmar
- Philippines
- Thailand
- Vietnam
- (Malaysia) Federal Land Development Authority

== Group stage ==
As of 26 October 2014

=== Group A ===
Team	Pld	W	W+	L	GF	GA	GD	Pts
Thailand (A)	3	3	0	0	13	10	+3	9
Vietnam (A)	3	2	0	1	17	7	+10	6
Indonesia	3	1	0	2	15	12	+3	3
(Malaysia) FELDA	3	0	0	3	7	23	−16	0

(A) Advanced to the semi-finals
23 October 2014
09:00

Indonesia	10–2	(Malaysia) FELDA
Komang Kariana Antara 0'; Made Antha Wijaya 0', 4'; Made Agus Dwipayana 5', 3'; Wayan Metra Jaya 5', 8'; Wayan Arsa Bagia 7'; Dewa Kadek Dwipayudha 11', 5'	Report	Ahmad Azrul Ahmad Rushidi 1'; Muhammad Azmi Hamzah 3'

Teluk Cempedak
Referee: Namazov Bakhtiyor (Uzbekistan)
23 October 2014
10:30

Thailand	4–3	Vietnam
Chattana 2'; Pongsak Khongkaew 8'; Komkrit Nanan 11'; Vitoon Tapinna 11'	Report	Trần Vinh Phong 0'; Lê Ngọc Cường 7'; Bùi Trần Tuấn Anh 11'

Teluk Cempedak
Referee: Suhaimi Mat Hassan (Malaysia)

24 October 2014
09:00

FELDA (Malaysia)	4–5	Thailand
Mohamad Nor Saifuruddin Bin Ngah 3', 8'; Amirul Asyraf Bin Abu Talib 5', 6'	Report	Piyapong Songpiew 3'; Tanandon Praracha 5'; Komkrit Nanan 4', 10'; Vitoon Tapinna 7'

Teluk Cempedak
Referee: Ahmed Mohamed Obaid Salasmy (United Arab Emirates)
24 October 2014
10:30

Vietnam	6–2	Indonesia
Trần Vinh Phong 0', 5', 3'; Bùi Trần Tuấn Anh 8', 5', 10'	Report	Made Antha Wijaya 8', 7'

Teluk Cempedak
Referee: Wan Mohamad Tarmizi Wan Ibrahim (Malaysia)

25 October 2014
09:00

Indonesia	3–4	Thailand
Agung Teguh Seri Rejeki 1'; Made Agus Dwipayana 2'; Made Antha Wijaya 4'; Wayan Arsa Bagia 7'	Report	Vitoon Tapinna 10', 0'; Komkrit Nanan 9'

Teluk Cempedak
Referee: Namazov Bakhtiyor (Uzbekistan)
25 October 2014
10:30

FELDA (Malaysia)	1–8	Vietnam
Mohd Arif Mohd Zahri 10'	Report	Bùi Trần Tuấn Anh 1', 5'; Trần Văn Hòa 2'; Trần Vinh Phong 2'; Huỳnh Ngọc Cường 6', 9'; Huỳnh Ngọc Tiến 7'; Lê Kim Tuấn 11'

Teluk Cempedak
Referee: Shao Liang (China)

=== Group B ===
Team	Pld	W	W+	L	GF	GA	GD	Pts
Laos (A)	3	3	0	0	14	8	+6	9
Malaysia (A)	3	2	0	1	16	8	+8	6
Myanmar	3	1	0	2	14	14	0	3
Philippines	3	0	0	3	6	20	−14	0

(A) Advanced to the semi-finals
23 October 2014
15:00

Myanmar	3–6	Malaysia
Aung Soe Moe 2', 3'; Chan Oo 6'	Report	Mohd Jamil Daud 0'; Mohd Khairil Nizam Mohamad 1'; Mohd Riduwan Mohd Nor 1'; Mohd Fakhrullah Mohamad 4'; Mohamad Norazaman Jaafar 8'; Mohd Zaharim Mohd Yusof 10'

Teluk Cempedak
Referee: Shao Liang (China)
23 October 2014
16:30

Laos	5–2	Philippines
Tu Mouakong Thao 4'; Phithack Kongmatilath 6', 7'; Tona Bounmalay 8', 11'	Report	Simpron Saludres 2'; Ali Mahmoud Ramos 6'

Teluk Cempedak
Referee: Masahiro Sakurada (Japan)

24 October 2014
15:00

Philippines	3–7	Myanmar
Salem Attar 5'; Rodolfo Vicente Del Rosario 9'; Madayag Maverick 10'	Report	Chan Oo 3', 6'; Pyae Phyo Aung 5'; Tu Nyein 8', 9'; Aung Soe Moe 11'; Htin Kyaw Aung 34'

Teluk Cempedak
Referee: Nakorn Sa-Ard (Thailand)
24 October 2014
16:30

Malaysia	2–4	Laos
Mohd Jamil Daud 4'; Mohd Riduwan Mohd Nor 9'	Report	Khounsombath Phommaxay 0'; Phithack Kongmatilath 1', 2'; Khitsakhone Champathong 11'

Teluk Cempedak
Referee: Suwat Wongsuwan (Thailand)

25 October 2014
15:00

Myanmar	4–5 (a.e.t.)	Laos
Chan Oo 2', 2', 3'; Wai Phyo 5'	Report	Chiu Nonmany 0', 2', 9'; Phayvanh Louanglath 2'; Phithack Kongmatilath 3'

Teluk Cempedak
Referee: Ahmed Mohamed Obaid Salasmy (United Arab Emirates)
25 October 2014
16:30

Malaysia	8–1	Philippines
Khairul Azizi Bin Norwawi 0'; Mohd Zaharim Mohd Yusof 1'; Mohd Riduwan Mohd Nor 1'; Mohamad Norazaman Jaafar 1', 3', 9'; Mohd Khairil Nizam Mohamad 7'; Mohd Hasrol Bin Ali 9'	Report	Jhonar Almento 5'

Teluk Cempedak
Referee: Suwat Wongsuwan (Thailand)

== Knockout stage ==
Semi-finals
27 October 2014
Thailand	2
Malaysia (a.e.t.)	3
27 October 2014
Laos	2
Vietnam	3

Final
29 October 2014
Malaysia	6
Vietnam	4
Third place
29 October 2014
Thailand	4
Laos	1

=== Semi-finals ===
27 October 2014
15:00

Thailand	2–3 (a.e.t.)	Malaysia
Praracha 0', 2'	Report	Norwawi 1'; Ali 8'; Halib 0' (a.e.t.)

Teluk Cempedak
Referee: Masahiro Sakurada (Japan)
27 October 2014
16:30

Laos	2–3	Vietnam
Vongsa 2'; Nonmany 2'	Report	Tuấn Anh 9', 10', 11'

Teluk Cempedak
Referee: Ibrahim (Malaysia)

=== Third-place ===
29 October 2014
15:00

Thailand	4–1	Laos
	Report

Teluk Cempedak

=== Final ===
29 October 2014
16:30

Malaysia	6–4	Vietnam
	Report

Teluk Cempedak

== Goalscorers ==
15 goals

- (Vietnam) Bùi Trần Tuấn Anh

7 goals

- (Laos) Phithack Kongmatilath

5 goals

- (Indonesia) Made Antha Wijaya
- (Myanmar) Chan Oo
- (Malaysia) Mohd Zaharim Mohd Yusof
- (Malaysia) Mohamad Norazaman Jaafar
- (Vietnam) Tran Vinh Phuong
- (Thailand) Tanandon Praracha
- (Thailand) Vitoon Tapinna
- (Thailand) Komkrit Nanan

4 goals

- (Indonesia) Made Agus Dwipayana
- (Myanmar) Aung Soe Moe
- (Laos) Chiu Nonmany

3 goals

- (Malaysia) Mohd Riduwan Mohd Nor

2 goals

- (Indonesia) Wayan Metra Jaya
- (Indonesia) Dewa Kadek Dwipayudha
- (Indonesia) Wayan Arsa Bagia
- (Laos) Tona Bounmalay
- (Laos) Khounsombath Phommaxay
- (Malaysia) Mohd Jamil Daud
- (Malaysia) Mohd Khairil Nizam Mohamad
- (Malaysia) Mohd Hasrol Bin Ali
- (Malaysia) Khairul Azizi Bin Norwawi
- (Malaysia) Mohd Fakhrullah Mohamad
- (Thailand) Piyapong Songpiew
- (Myanmar) Tu Nyein
- (Malaysia) Mohamad Nor Saifuruddin Bin Ngah (FELDA)
- (Malaysia) Amirul Asyraf Bin Abu Talib (FELDA)
- (Vietnam) Huynh Ngoc Cuong

1 goal

- (Indonesia) Agung Teguh Seri Rejeki
- (Indonesia) Komang Kariana Antara
- (Malaysia) Alias Bin Halib
- (Malaysia) Ahmad Azrul Ahmad Rushidi (FELDA)
- (Malaysia) Muhammad Azmi Hamzah (FELDA)
- (Malaysia) Mohd Arif Mohd Zahri (FELDA)
- (Thailand) Pongsak Khongkaew
- (Thailand) Chattana
- (Vietnam) Le Ngoc Cuong
- (Vietnam) Le Kim Tuan
- (Vietnam) Tran Van Hoa
- (Vietnam) Huynh Ngoc Tien
- (Vietnam) Tran Vinh Phong
- (Laos) Phayvanh Louanglath
- (Laos) Tu Mouakong Thao
- (Laos) Khitsakhone Champathong
- (Laos) Thinnakone Vongsa
- (Philippines) Ali Mahmoud Ramos
- (Philippines) Simpron Saludres
- (Philippines) Madayag Maverick
- (Philippines) Rodolfo Vicente Del Rosario
- (Philippines) Salem Attar
- (Philippines) Jhonar Almento
- (Myanmar) Pyae Phyo Aung
- (Myanmar) Htin Kyaw Aung
- (Myanmar) Wai Phyo
