= Beach soccer at the 2016 Asian Beach Games =

- Venue: Biển Đông Park
- Dates: 25 September – 2 October 2016

Beach soccer competition at the 2016 Asian Beach Games was held in Da Nang, Vietnam from 25 September to 2 October 2016 at Biển Đông Park.

== Medalists ==
Event	Gold	Silver	Bronze
Men	Japan; Shingo Terukina; Yusuke Kawai; Shotaro Haraguchi; Yuki Nakahara; Naoya Matsuo; Teruki Tabata; Takaaki Oba; Takuya Akaguma; Takasuke Goto; Ozu Moreira	Oman; Amjad Al-Hamdani; Abdullah Al-Sauti; Jalal Al-Sinani; Yahya Al-Araimi; Mundhar Al-Araimi; Mashal Al-Araimi; Nooh Al-Zadjali; Khalid Al-Araimi; Hani Al-Dhabit; Haitham Harib	Lebanon; Mohamad Choker; Abbas Zeineddine; Mohamad Ahmad Choker; Mohamad Mechleb Matar; Mustafa Al-Zein; Mohamad Merhi; Mohamad Sleiman; Ahmad Grada; Sameh Jalal; Hussein Salameh

== Results ==
=== First round ===
==== Group A ====
Pos	Team	Pld	W	WE	WP	L	GF	GA	GD	Pts
1	Thailand	2	2	0	0	0	9	3	+6	6
2	Vietnam	2	1	0	0	1	12	5	+7	3
3	Laos	2	0	0	0	2	6	19	−13	0

Source: OCA
25 September
16:00

Vietnam	12–3	Laos
Hồ Ngọc Lĩnh 9'; Lê Kim Tuấn 9'; Bùi Trần Tuấn Anh 10', 14', 23'; Trần Vĩnh Phong 11', 16'; Trần Ngọc Bảo 23', 25'; Nguyễn Hoàng Quân 26', 31'; Phùng Ngọc Vĩnh Quý 26'		Nonmany 7'; Champathong 14'; Keodouangdet 28'

Biển Đông Park, Da Nang
Referee: Leng Shao (China)

26 September
16:00

Thailand	7–3	Laos
Nanan 1', 11', 18' (pen.), 31'; Lepaijit 13'; Songpiew 19'; Srathongjan 20'		Kongmathilath 8', 29' (pen.); Nonmany 33'

Biển Đông Park, Da Nang
Referee: Bakhtiyor Namazov (Uzbekistan)

27 September
16:00

Vietnam	0–2	Thailand
		Tapinna 6'; Songpiew 31'

Biển Đông Park, Da Nang
Referee: Makoto Sato (Japan)

==== Group B ====
Pos	Team	Pld	W	WE	WP	L	GF	GA	GD	Pts
1	Lebanon	2	1	0	1	0	7	4	+3	4
2	Oman	2	1	0	0	1	7	5	+2	3
3	Qatar	2	0	0	0	2	3	8	−5	0

Source: OCA
25 September
14:30

Oman	3–3 (a.e.t.)	Lebanon
Al-Zadjali 7'; K. Al-Araimi 10', 31'		Grada 7'; Matar 17', 21'
Penalties
Al-Dhabit (penalty missed); Mu. Al-Araimi (penalty missed)	0–2	(penalty scored) Merhi; (penalty scored) Matar

Biển Đông Park, Da Nang
Referee: Bakhtiyor Namazov (Uzbekistan)

26 September
14:30

Qatar	1–4	Lebanon
Idrees 30'		Matar 5'; Grada 8'; Merhi 13', 34'

Biển Đông Park, Da Nang
Referee: Waleed Mohamed (Bahrain)

27 September
14:30

Oman	4–2	Qatar
Al-Sauti 4', 5'; Mu. Al-Araimi 8'; K. Al-Araimi 9'		Al-Khater 2', 34'

Biển Đông Park, Da Nang
Referee: Ebrahim Al-Mansoori (United Arab Emirates)

==== Group C ====
Pos	Team	Pld	W	WE	WP	L	GF	GA	GD	Pts
1	Uzbekistan	1	0	0	1	0	3	3	0	1
2	United Arab Emirates	0	0	0	0	0	3	3	0	0

Source: OCA
27 September
16:00

United Arab Emirates	3–3 (a.e.t.)	Uzbekistan
Al-Jasmi 5'; K. Al-Balooshi 33'; A. Salem 34'		Sharipov 9', 14'; Fakhriddinov 23'
Penalties
Al-Kaabi (penalty missed); Daryaei (penalty missed)	0–2	(penalty scored) Fakhriddinov; (penalty scored) Shlema

Biển Đông Park, Da Nang
Referee: Ali Sharifat (Iran)

==== Group D ====
Pos	Team	Pld	W	WE	WP	L	GF	GA	GD	Pts
1	Japan	2	2	0	0	0	18	2	+16	6
2	Afghanistan	2	1	0	0	1	9	17	−8	3
3	China	2	0	0	0	2	8	16	−8	0

Source: OCA
25 September
14:30

Japan	11–0	Afghanistan
Oba 1'; Akaguma 8', 8', 27', 36'; Goto 10', 18' (pen.), 31'; Ozu 15'; Haraguchi 25'; Terukina 29'

Biển Đông Park, Da Nang
Referee: Suhaimi Mat Hassan (Malaysia)

26 September
14:30

China	6–9	Afghanistan
Cai Weiming 11'; Liu Yisi 12'; Bai Fan 25', 27', 28'; Tuluxun Maimaiti 33'		Sharifi 4'; Gulzar 21'; Mohammadi 24', 25' (pen.), 33'; Sarbiland 26'; Baran 27', 29', 34'

Biển Đông Park, Da Nang
Referee: Hassan Abed Rabbo (Lebanon)

27 September
14:30

Japan	7–2	China
Goto 1', 12', 24' (pen.); Akaguma 7', 28'; Tabata 15'; Oba 25'		Liu Yisi 22' (pen.), 23'

Biển Đông Park, Da Nang
Referee: Turki Al-Salehi (Oman)

=== Knockout round ===
Quarterfinals
29 September
Japan	6
United Arab Emirates	2
29 September
Lebanon (p)	3 (4)
Vietnam	3 (3)
29 September
Uzbekistan	4
Afghanistan	9
29 September
Thailand	1
Oman	4

Semifinals
1 October
Japan	6
Lebanon	5
1 October
Afghanistan	2
Oman	8

Gold medal match
2 October
Japan (a.e.t.)	4
Oman	3
Bronze medal match
2 October
Lebanon	9
Afghanistan	5

==== Quarterfinals ====
29 September
14:30

Japan	6–2	United Arab Emirates
Oba 1'; Ozu 20'; Tabata 22'; Akaguma 24'; Haraguchi 33' (pen.); Goto 35'		A. Salem 12'; K. Al-Balooshi 20'

Biển Đông Park, Da Nang
Referee: Fallah Al-Balushi (Oman)

29 September
14:30

Lebanon	3–3 (a.e.t.)	Vietnam
Matar 8', 30'; Grada 19'		Bùi Trần Tuấn Anh 16'; Phùng Ngọc Vĩnh Quý 28'; Trần Ngọc Bảo 29'
Penalties
Merhi (penalty scored); Matar (penalty missed); Al-Zein (penalty scored); Grada (penalty scored); Zeineddine (penalty scored)	4–3	(penalty scored) Lê Kim Tuấn; (penalty scored) Trần Vĩnh Phong; (penalty missed) Hồ Ngọc Lĩnh; (penalty scored) Nguyễn Hoàng Quân; (penalty missed) Trần Văn Vũ

Biển Đông Park, Da Nang
Referee: Ali Sharifat (Iran)

29 September
16:00

Uzbekistan	4–9	Afghanistan
Fakhriddinov 8', 20'; Sharipov 20'; Tadjiyev 34'		Mohammadi 1', 2', 4', 36'; Gulzar 2'; Azad 5'; Baran 15', 21', 36'

Biển Đông Park, Da Nang
Referee: Ahmed Al-Salami (United Arab Emirates)

29 September
16:00

Thailand	1–4	Oman
Songpiew 32'		Al-Zadjali 8', 30'; K. Al-Araimi 20' (pen.); Y. Al-Araimi 31'

Biển Đông Park, Da Nang
Referee: Ebrahim Al-Mansoori (United Arab Emirates)

==== Semifinals ====
30 September
8:00

Japan	6–5	Lebanon
Tabata 6'; Goto 7'; Akaguma 20', 21', 23'; Ozu 24'		Matar 4'; M. Choker 9'; Al-Zein 24', 28'; Merhi 35'

Biển Đông Park, Da Nang
Referee: Leng Shao (China)

30 September
14:30

Afghanistan	2–8	Oman
Mohammadi 17', 33' (pen.)		Al-Zadjali 5'; Y. Al-Araimi 6', 13'; Ma. Al-Araimi 11'; Al-Sauti 21'; Al-Dhabit 27'; Mu. Al-Araimi 29'; K. Al-Araimi 32'

Biển Đông Park, Da Nang
Referee: Ebrahim Akbarpour (Iran)

==== Bronze medal match ====
2 October
14:00

Lebanon	9–5	Afghanistan
Al-Zein 3', 25'; Matar 10', 30'; Zeineddine 17'; Grada 19', 29'; Sleiman 28' (pen.); M. Choker 34'		Sharifi 3', 31'; Mohammadi 18'; Abdalli 18'; Gulzar 32'

Biển Đông Park, Da Nang
Referee: Ebrahim Al-Mansoori (United Arab Emirates)

==== Gold medal match ====
2 October
15:30

Japan	4–3 (a.e.t.)	Oman
Oba 3', 38'; Ozu 5', 37'		K. Al-Araimi 5', 39'; Al-Zadjali 16'

Biển Đông Park, Da Nang
Referee: Bakhtiyor Namazov (Uzbekistan)

== Goalscorers ==
10 goals

- Samiullah Mohammadi (AFG)
- Takuya Akaguma (JPN)

8 goals

- Takasuke Goto (JPN)
- Mohamad Mechleb Matar (LIB)

7 goals

- Khalid Al-Araimi (OMA)

6 goals

- Hazrat Gul Baran (AFG)

5 goals

- Ozu Moreira (JPN)
- Takaaki Oba (JPN)
- Ahmad Grada (LIB)
- Nooh Al-Zadjali (OMA)

4 goals

- Mustafa Al-Zein (LIB)
- Komkrit Nanan (THA)
- Bùi Trần Tuấn Anh (VIE)

3 goals

- Hamidullah Gulzar (AFG)
- Zainuddin Sharifi (AFG)
- Bai Fan (CHN)
- Liu Yisi (CHN)
- Teruki Tabata (JPN)
- Mohamad Merhi (LIB)
- Yahya Al-Araimi (OMA)
- Abdullah Al-Sauti (OMA)
- Piyapong Songpiew (THA)
- Trần Ngọc Bảo (VIE)
- Feruz Fakhriddinov (UZB)
- Jamoliddin Sharipov (UZB)

2 goals

- Shotaro Haraguchi (JPN)
- Phithack Kongmathilath (LAO)
- Chiu Nonmany (LAO)
- Mohamad Choker (LIB)
- Mundhar Al-Araimi (OMA)
- Fawaz Al-Khater (QAT)
- Nguyễn Hoàng Quân (VIE)
- Phùng Ngọc Vĩnh Quý (VIE)
- Trần Vĩnh Phong (VIE)
- Kamal Al-Balooshi (UAE)
- Ahmed Beshr Salem (UAE)

1 goal

- Abdullah Abdalli (AFG)
- Mahmood Azad (AFG)
- Jamir Sarbiland (AFG)
- Cai Weiming (CHN)
- Tuluxun Maimaiti (CHN)
- Shingo Terukina (JPN)
- Khitsakhone Champathong (LAO)
- Ketsana Keodouangdet (LAO)
- Mohamad Sleiman (LIB)
- Abbas Zeineddine (LIB)
- Mashal Al-Araimi (OMA)
- Hani Al-Dhabit (OMA)
- Mohamed Hashim Idrees (QAT)
- Watchara Lepaijit (THA)
- Wattanachai Srathongjan (THA)
- Vitoon Tapinna (THA)
- Hồ Ngọc Lĩnh (VIE)
- Lê Kim Tuấn (VIE)
- Mohamed Al-Jasmi (UAE)
- Zayniddin Tadjiyev (UZB)
