= Pyae Phyo Aung =

Burmese footballer

Personal information
- Full name: Pyae Phyo Aung
- Date of birth: 19 November 1987 (age 38)
- Place of birth: Shan State, Myanmar
- Height: 1.75 m (5 ft 9 in)
- Position: Defender

Senior career*
Years	Team	Apps	(Gls)
–2008	Air Bagan F.C.		
2009–2017 (retired)	Yangon United		(2)

International career^{‡}
2012–	Myanmar	10	(2)
2014–	Myanmar Beach Soccer	2	(1)
- * Club domestic league appearances and goals ‡ National team caps and goals as of 14:23, 28 October 2014 (UTC)

Pyae Phyo Aung (born 19 November 1987) is a footballer from Burma, and a defender for Myanmar national football team and Yangon United. He is the three-time Myanmar National League winner with Yangon United.

== International career ==
He is currently part of the Myanmar national beach soccer team.

== International goals ==
No.	Date	Venue	Opponent	Score	Result	Competition
1.	11 October 2012	Thuwunna Stadium, Yangon, Myanmar	Cambodia	3–0	3–0	2012 AFF Championship qualification
2.	2 March 2013	Thuwunna Stadium, Yangon, Myanmar	Guam	3–0	5–0	2014 AFC Challenge Cup qualification
