= Laos national beach soccer team =

National sports team

Laos
- Association: Lao Football Federation
- Confederation: AFC (Asia)
- Sub-confederation: AFF (Southeast Asia)
- FIFA code: LAO
- BSWW ranking: NR (19 January 2026)
First colours
Second colours

The Laos national beach soccer team represents Laos in beach soccer.

== Roster ==
Note: Flags indicate national team as defined under FIFA eligibility rules; some limited exceptions apply. Players may hold more than one non-FIFA nationality.

| No. | Pos. | Nation | Player |
|---|---|---|---|
| 1 | GK | | Phonepaserth Vongsipasong |
| 2 | | | Souvanpheng Phanthavong |
| 3 | | | Khamala Xayalath |
| 4 | | | Soukakhone Bountathip |
| 5 | | | Phouthone Innalay |
| 6 | | | Phayanh Louanglath |

| No. | Pos. | Nation | Player |
|---|---|---|---|
| 7 | | | Khitsakhone Champathong |
| 8 | | | Thinnakone Vongsa |
| 9 | | | Phitack Kongmathilath |
| 10 | | | Chiu Nonmany |
| 11 | | | Tona Bounmalay |
| 12 | | | Tu Mouakong Thao |

== Tournaments ==
=== AFF Championship ===
| Year | Round | Pos | Pld | W | W aet/pso | L | GF | GA | GD |
|---|---|---|---|---|---|---|---|---|---|
| Kuantan, Pahang, Malaysia. 2014 | Fourth place | 4 | 5 | 3 | 0 | 2 | 17 | 15 | +2 |
| (Indonesia) 2018 | | | | | | | | | |
| Total | | | 8 | 5 | 0 | 4 | 33 | 24 | +9 |

=== AFC Championship ===
| Year | Round | Pos | Pld | W | W aet/pso | L | GF | GA | GD |
|---|---|---|---|---|---|---|---|---|---|
| Dubai, United Arab Emirates. 2006 | Did not enter | | | | | | | | |
| Dubai, United Arab Emirates. 2007 | Did not enter | | | | | | | | |
| Dubai, United Arab Emirates. 2008 | Did not enter | | | | | | | | |
| Dubai, United Arab Emirates. 2009 | Did not enter | | | | | | | | |
| Muscat, Oman. 2011 | Did not enter | | | | | | | | |
| Doha, Qatar. 2013 | Did not enter | | | | | | | | |
| Doha, Qatar. 2015 | Group stage | 11 | 3 | 1 | 0 | 2 | 11 | 21 | -10 |
| Dubai, United Arab Emirates. 2017 | Did not enter | | | | | | | | |
| Total | | | 3 | 1 | 0 | 2 | 11 | 21 | -10 |
