= Afghanistan national beach soccer team =

Afghanistan
- Nickname: شيران خراسان (The Lions of Khorasan)
- Association: Afghanistan Football Federation (AFF)
- Confederation: AFC (Asia)
- Most caps: Samiullah Mohammadi (13)
- Top scorer: Samiullah Mohammadi (15)
- FIFA code: AFG
- BSWW ranking: 70 ▲1 (2 September 2026)

First international
- Afghanistan 4–6 China (Haiyang; 16 June 2012)

Biggest win
- Afghanistan 9–4 Uzbekistan (Danang; 29 September 2016)

Biggest defeat
- Afghanistan 0–14 Iran (Pattaya; 23 March 2025)

AFC Beach Soccer Championship
- Appearances: 5 (first in 2013)
- Best result: Group Stage (2013, 2017, 2019, 2023, 2025)

The Afghanistan national beach soccer team (Dari: تیم ملی فوتبال ساحلی افغانستان) represents Afghanistan in international beach soccer competitions and is controlled by the AFF, the governing body for football in Afghanistan.

== Tournament records ==
=== FIFA Beach Soccer World Cup ===
- 1995 – Did not enter
- 1996 – Did not enter
- 1997 – Did not enter
- 1998 – Did not enter
- 1999 – Did not enter
- 2000 – Did not enter
- 2001 – Did not enter
- 2002 – Did not enter
- 2003 – Did not enter
- 2004 – Did not enter
- 2005 – Did not enter
- 2006 – Did not enter
- 2007 – Did not enter
- 2008 – Did not enter
- 2009 – Did not enter
- 2011 – Did not enter
- 2013 – Did not qualify
- 2015 – Did not enter
- 2017 – Did not qualify
- 2019 – Did not qualify
- 2021 – Did not enter
- 2023 – Did not qualify
- 2025 – To be determined

=== AFC Beach Soccer Championship ===
- 2006 – Did not enter
- 2007 – Did not enter
- 2008 – Did not enter
- 2009 – Did not enter
- 2011 – Did not enter
- 2013 – Groupstage
- 2015 – Last 16
- 2017 – Groupstage
- 2019 – Groupstage
- 2023 – Groupstage

=== Asian Beach Games ===
- (Indonesia) 2008 – Did not enter
- (Oman) 2010 – Did not enter
- (China) 2012 – Groupstage
- (Thailand) 2014 – Did not enter
- (Vietnam) 2016 – 4th place
