= Pongsak Khongkaew =

Thai beach soccer player and footballer

Personal information
- Date of birth: 31 January 1977 (age 49)
- Place of birth: Chantaburi, Thailand
- Position: Defender

Senior career*
Years	Team	Apps	(Gls)
- Thai Port FC
2003	Singapore Armed Forces FC		

International career
- Thailand (beach soccer)
- * Club domestic league appearances and goals

Pongsak Khongkaew (born 31 January 1977) is a Thai association football and beach soccer player, and a member of the Thailand national beach soccer team, making two appearances in the 2005 FIFA Beach Soccer World Cup.
