= Rashad Jamal Salem =

Bahraini footballer

Rashad Jamal
Personal information
- Full name: Rashad Jamal Salem
- Date of birth: 18 January 1979 (age 47)
- Place of birth: Bahrain
- Height: 1.78 m (5 ft 10 in)
- Position: Striker

Team information
- Current team: Al-Najma

Senior career*
Years	Team	Apps	(Gls)
1999–2014	Al-Najma		

International career^{‡}
2000–2008	Bahrain	30	(1)
- * Club domestic league appearances and goals as of 20 November 2008 ‡ National team caps and goals as of 17 October 2011

Rashad Jamal Salem (born January 18, 1979) is a Bahraini footballer currently playing for Al-Najma of Bahrain and the Bahrain national football team.

== National team career statistics ==
=== Goals for Senior National Team ===
#	Date	Venue	Opponent	Score	Result	Competition
	February 2, 2005	Doha, Qatar	Lebanon	2-1	Won	Friendly
	January 23, 2008	Manama, Bahrain	Syria	1-2	Lost	Friendly
