= China national beach soccer team =

China
- Association: CFA
- Confederation: AFC (Asia)
- FIFA code: CHN
- BSWW ranking: 42 (2 September 2026)
First colours
Second colours

The China national beach soccer team represents People's Republic of China in international beach soccer competitions. They have never qualified for the FIFA Beach Soccer World Cup.

== Roster ==
Correct as of July 2012

Note: Flags indicate national team as defined under FIFA eligibility rules; some limited exceptions apply. Players may hold more than one non-FIFA nationality.

No.	Pos.	Nation	Player
1	GK	CHN	Han Yn
2	DF	CHN	Han Xo (captain)
3	DF	CHN	Lyu Ys
5	DF	SUI	Sun Gr
6	MF	CHN	Hao Mh

No.	Pos.	Nation	Player
8	MF	CHN	Cai Wm
9	FW	CHN	Olu H
10	FW	CHN	Wan Ch
12	GK	CHN	Sun D

Coach: Ross Ongaro

== Tournament ==
=== FIFA Beach Soccer World Cup ===
- 1995 to 2005 – Did not enter
- 2006 to 2023 – Did not qualify
- 2025 – To be determined

=== AFC Beach Soccer Championship ===
AFC Beach Soccer Championship record
Year	Round	Pld	W	WE	WP	L	GS	GA	DIF	Pts
(United Arab Emirates) 2006	Fourth place	4	1	0	0	3	10	16	-6	3
(United Arab Emirates) 2007	Fifth place	2	0	0	1	1	6	7	-1	1
(United Arab Emirates) 2008	Fourth place	4	1	0	0	3	6	19	-13	3
(United Arab Emirates) 2009	Seventh place	3	0	0	0	3	4	14	-10	0
(Oman) 2011	Fifth place	4	2	0	0	2	10	9	+1	6
(Qatar) 2013	Seventh place	5	3	0	0	2	33	18	+15	9
(Qatar) 2015	Sixth place	6	2	0	1	3	16	28	-12	7
(Malaysia) 2017	12th place	4	0	0	0	4	3	24	-21	0
(Thailand) 2019	9th place	3	1	0	0	2	14	14	0	3
(Thailand) 2023	Seventh place	3	2	0	0	2	10	22	0	6
(Thailand) 2025	12th place	3	0	1	0	2	7	11	-4	2
Total	11/11	41	12	1	2	27	119	182	-63	34

=== Asian Beach Games ===
Asian Beach Games record
Year	Round	Pld	W	WE	WP	L	GS	GA	DIF	Pts
(Indonesia) 2008	Quarterfinal	4	1	0	1	2	12	12	0	4
(Oman) 2010	4th place	6	4	0	0	2	20	23	-3	12
(China) 2012	2nd place	6	3	0	1	2	20	14	+6	10
(Thailand) 2014	8th place	5	1	0	0	4	18	21	-3	3
(Vietnam) 2016	10th place	2	0	0	0	2	8	16	-8	0
(China) 2026	6th place	2	0	0	0	2	4	8	-4	0
Total	6/6	25	9	0	2	14	82	94	-12	29

=== BSWW Mundialito ===
BSWW Mundialito record
Year	Round	Pld	W	WE	WP	L	GS	GA	DIF	Pts
(Portugal) 2012	4th place	3	0	0	0	3	3	18	-15	0
(Portugal) 2016	4th place	3	0	0	0	3	2	38	-36	10
Total	2/20	6	0	0	0	6	5	56	-51	0
