= Myanmar national beach soccer team =

National sports team

Myanmar
- Nickname: The White Angels
- Association: Myanmar Football Federation
- Confederation: AFC (Asia)
- Sub-confederation: AFF (South-East Asia)
- FIFA code: MYA
- BSWW ranking: NR (2 June 2025)
| First colours | Second colours |

The Myanmar national beach soccer team represents Myanmar in international beach soccer competitions and is controlled by the Myanmar Football Federation, the governing body for football in Myanmar.

== FIFA Beach Soccer World Cup ==
The team has failed to qualify for each of the FIFA Beach Soccer World Cups held since the 1995 Beach Soccer World Championship in Brazil up to and including the 2015 FIFA Beach Soccer World Cup in Portugal. The qualifying rounds for the 2017 FIFA Beach Soccer World Cup are scheduled to take place in 2016 and 2017.

== Current squad ==
Note: Flags indicate national team as defined under FIFA eligibility rules; some limited exceptions apply. Players may hold more than one non-FIFA nationality.

| No. | Pos. | Nation | Player |
|---|---|---|---|
| 1 | GK | | Ya Wai Zin |
| 2 | | | Si Thu Aung |
| 3 | | | Zaw Ye Maung |
| 4 | | | Zaw Zaw Tun |
| 5 | | | Htein Lin |
| 6 | | | Wai Phyo |

| No. | Pos. | Nation | Player |
|---|---|---|---|
| 7 | | | Pyae Phyo Aung |
| 8 | | | Chan Oo |
| 9 | | | Aung Than Win |
| 10 | | | Aung Soe Moe |
| 11 | | | Tun Lin Oo |
| 12 | | | Htin Kyaw Aung |

== Achievements ==
=== AFF Beach Soccer Championship ===
| Year | Round | Pos | Pld | W | W aet/pso | L | GF | GA | GD |
|---|---|---|---|---|---|---|---|---|---|
| (Malaysia) 2014 | Group Stage | 6 | 3 | 1 | 0 | 2 | 14 | 14 | 0 |
| (Indonesia) 2018 | | | | | | | | | |
| Total | 0 Titles | 2/2 | 6 | 1 | 0 | 5 | 22 | 31 | -8 |
