= 2017 AFC Beach Soccer Championship =

Kejohanan Bola Sepak Pantai AFC 2017

Tournament details
- Host country: Malaysia
- City: Kuala Terengganu
- Dates: 4–11 March
- Teams: 13 (from 1 confederation)
- Venue: 1 (in 1 host city)

Final positions
- Champions: Iran (2nd title)
- Runners-up: United Arab Emirates
- Third place: Japan
- Fourth place: Lebanon

Tournament statistics
- Matches played: 23
- Goals scored: 198 (8.61 per match)
- Attendance: 6,720 (292 per match)
- Top scorer: (Iran) Mohammad Ali Mokhtari (12 goals)
- Best player: (Iran) Mohammad Ali Mokhtari
- Fair play award: Iran

The 2017 AFC Beach Soccer Championship was a beach soccer tournament which took place between 4–11 March 2017 in Malaysia. The tournament was originally scheduled for 21–29 January 2017, but was postponed. The top three teams qualified for the 2017 FIFA Beach Soccer World Cup in the Bahamas.

== Participating teams and draw ==
The following 14 teams entered the tournament. Myanmar initially entered but decided to withdraw prior to the draw.

- Afghanistan
- Bahrain
- China
- Iran
- Iraq
- Japan
- Lebanon
- Malaysia (hosts)
- Myanmar (withdrew)
- Oman
- Qatar
- Thailand
- United Arab Emirates
- Uzbekistan

The draw of the tournament was held on 10 January 2017, 15:00 UTC+8, at the AFC House in Kuala Lumpur, Malaysia. The 13 teams were drawn into one group of five teams and two groups of four teams. The teams were seeded according to their results in the 2015 AFC Beach Soccer Championship.

Pot 1	Pot 2	Pot 3	Pot 4	Pot 5 (unranked)
1. Oman; 2. Japan; 3. Iran	4. Lebanon; 5. United Arab Emirates; 6. Bahrain	7. Uzbekistan; 8. China; 9. Iraq	10. Thailand; 11. Qatar	Afghanistan; Malaysia

== Group stage ==
Each team earns three points for a win in regulation time, two points for a win in extra time, one point for a win in a penalty shoot-out, and no points for a defeat. The winners from each group and the best runner-up advance to the semi-finals.

Uzbekistan withdrew in the days prior to the start of the group stage.

All times are local, MYT (UTC+8).

=== Group A ===
Pos	Team	Pld	W	W+	WP	L	GF	GA	GD	Pts	Qualification
1	Iran	4	4	0	0	0	35	3	+32	12	Knockout stage
2	Bahrain	4	3	0	0	1	19	14	+5	9	
3	Afghanistan	4	2	0	0	2	17	17	0	6	
4	Malaysia (H)	4	1	0	0	3	10	26	−16	3	
5	China	4	0	0	0	4	3	24	−21	0	

Source: AFC
Rules for classification: 1) Points; 2) Head-to-head points; 3) Head-to-head goal difference; 4) Head-to-head goals scored; 5) Re-apply 2–4 if possible; 6) Total goal difference; 7) Total goals scored; 8) Penalty kicks if both teams on pitch; 9) Disciplinary points; 10) Drawing of lots (Regulations Article 10.5).
(H) Host
4 March 2017
14:30

China	0–5	Bahrain
	Report	Jamal 1', 17'; Ahmed 31'; Abdulla 31'; Salem 35'

Pantai Batu Buruk, Kuala Terengganu
Attendance: 600
Referee: Bakhtiyor Namazov (Uzbekistan)
4 March 2017
16:00

Afghanistan	5–3	Malaysia
Baran 5'; Sharifi 11'; Qaderi 28', 30', 31'	Report	Asaari 5', 31'; Nizam 34'

Pantai Batu Buruk, Kuala Terengganu
Attendance: 750
Referee: Turki' Abdullah Said Al Salehi (Oman)

5 March 2017
14:30

Afghanistan	7–2	China
Mohammadi 3', 17'; Sharifi 16'; Qaderi 11', 20', 28'; Gulzar 35'	Report	Qiu 11'; Li 16'

Pantai Batu Buruk, Kuala Terengganu
Attendance: 200
Referee: Ebrahim Yousef Almansoori (United Arab Emirates)
5 March 2017
16:00

Malaysia	0–14	Iran
	Report	Mesigar 3', 7'; Mokhtari 7', 12', 17', 30'; Boulokbashi 11', 17', 23', 30'; Kiani 12'; Nazem 14'; Behzadpour 17'; Ahmadzadeh 21'

Pantai Batu Buruk, Kuala Terengganu
Attendance: 800
Referee: Yuichi Hatano (Japan)

6 March 2017
14:30

Bahrain	6–5	Malaysia
Almalki 11'; Jamal 12'; Mohamed 13'; Abdulla 17'; Salem 19'; Alabdulla 32'	Report	Huzair 11'; Yusof 19', 35'; Mohamad 23'; Nizam 28'

Pantai Batu Buruk, Kuala Terengganu
Attendance: 720
Referee: Ahmed Mohamed Obaid (United Arab Emirates)
6 March 2017
16:00

Iran	6–1	Afghanistan
Boulokbashi 7', 18' (pen.), 34'; Nazem 10'; Mesigar 19'; Abdollahi 36'	Report	Qaderi 7'

Pantai Batu Buruk, Kuala Terengganu
Attendance: 150
Referee: Suwat Wongsuwan (Thailand)

7 March 2017
14:30

Bahrain	6–4	Afghanistan
Jamal 6', 15'; Ahmed 10'; Ashoor 14'; Almalki 22'; Alyaqoobi 32'	Report	Qaderi 21', 31'; Jafari 24'; Alavi 27'

Pantai Batu Buruk, Kuala Terengganu
Attendance: 100
Referee: Makoto Sato (Japan)
7 March 2017
16:00

China	0–10	Iran
	Report	Mokhtari 1', 8', 13'; Boulokbashi 6', 31'; Mesigar 6'; Hosseini 10'; Nazem 13'; Moradi 14'; Akbari 19'

Pantai Batu Buruk, Kuala Terengganu
Attendance: 150
Referee: Fallah Hassan Al Balushi (Oman)

8 March 2017
14:30

Malaysia	2–1	China
Yusof 2'; Mohamad 12'	Report	Liu 16'

Pantai Batu Buruk, Kuala Terengganu
Attendance: 715
Referee: Yuichi Hatano (Japan)
8 March 2017
16:00

Iran	5–2	Bahrain
Ahmadzadeh 12', 15'; Behzadpour 14'; Nazem 23'; Mokhtari 28'	Report	Alabdulla 4'; Ahmed 6'

Pantai Batu Buruk, Kuala Terengganu
Attendance: 150
Referee: Suwat Wongsuwan (Thailand)

=== Group B ===
Pos	Team	Pld	W	W+	WP	L	GF	GA	GD	Pts	Qualification
1	Lebanon	2	2	0	0	0	10	4	+6	6	Knockout stage
2	Oman	2	1	0	0	1	6	6	0	3	
3	Thailand	2	0	0	0	2	3	9	−6	0	
4	Uzbekistan	0	0	0	0	0	0	0	0	0	Withdrew

Source: AFC
Rules for classification: 1) Points; 2) Head-to-head points; 3) Head-to-head goal difference; 4) Head-to-head goals scored; 5) Re-apply 2–4 if possible; 6) Total goal difference; 7) Total goals scored; 8) Penalty kicks if both teams on pitch; 9) Disciplinary points; 10) Drawing of lots (Regulations Article 10.5).
6 March 2017
13:00

Oman	3–2	Thailand
Aloraimi 29', 35' (pen.); Al Araimi 30'	Report	Nanan 6'; Pinkaew 27'

Pantai Batu Buruk, Kuala Terengganu
Attendance: 50
Referee: Shao Liang (China)

7 March 2017
13:00

Thailand	1–6	Lebanon
Madtoha 29'	Report	Grada 1'; Jalal 3'; Merhi 13'; Abdullah 26' (pen.); Ma. Matar 27'; Sleiman 33'

Pantai Batu Buruk, Kuala Terengganu
Attendance: 120
Referee: Wan Mohamad Tarmizi (Malaysia)

8 March 2017
13:00

Oman	3–4	Lebanon
Al Araimi 11'; Al Zadjali 22'; Salim 28'	Report	Al Zein 16'; Merhi 28', 36'; Grada 36'

Pantai Batu Buruk, Kuala Terengganu
Attendance: 100
Referee: Ebrahim Yousef Almansoori (United Arab Emirates)

=== Group C ===
Pos	Team	Pld	W	W+	WP	L	GF	GA	GD	Pts	Qualification
1	United Arab Emirates	3	3	0	0	0	19	5	+14	9	Knockout stage
2	Japan	3	2	0	0	1	29	7	+22	6	Knockout stage
3	Iraq	3	0	0	1	2	4	19	−15	1	
4	Qatar	3	0	0	0	3	3	24	−21	0	

Source: AFC
Rules for classification: 1) Points; 2) Head-to-head points; 3) Head-to-head goal difference; 4) Head-to-head goals scored; 5) Re-apply 2–4 if possible; 6) Total goal difference; 7) Total goals scored; 8) Penalty kicks if both teams on pitch; 9) Disciplinary points; 10) Drawing of lots (Regulations Article 10.5).
6 March 2017
10:00

United Arab Emirates	6–0	Iraq
Karim 2'; Mohamed 9'; Ali 12', 19'; W. Salem 16'; A. Salem 32'	Report

Pantai Batu Buruk, Kuala Terengganu
Attendance: 75
Referee: Waleed Mohamed Abdulkarim (Bahrain)
6 March 2017
11:30

Japan	14–0	Qatar
Oba 5'; Moreira 7', 11', 13', 25'; Goto 16', 24'; Akaguma 19', 19' (pen.), 25' (pen.); Sakata 20', 27'; Iino 29', 31'	Report

Pantai Batu Buruk, Kuala Terengganu
Attendance: 100
Referee: Suhaimi Bin Mat Hussan (Malaysia)

7 March 2017
10:00

Qatar	1–8	United Arab Emirates
Daoud 22'	Report	W. Salem 3', 12'; A. Mohammad 3'; Daryaei 7'; Al-Jassim 8' (o.g.); Mohamed 13'; A. Salem 26'; W. Mohammad 33'

Pantai Batu Buruk, Kuala Terengganu
Attendance: 50
Referee: Bakhtiyor Namazov (Uzbekistan)
7 March 2017
11:30

Iraq	2–11	Japan
Ibrahim 16'; Mohammed 28'	Report	Oba 1', 5', 26', 35'; Akaguma 6', 9'; Goto 12'; Terukina 15'; Haraguchi 23'; Sakata 27'; Moreira 28'

Pantai Batu Buruk, Kuala Terengganu
Attendance: 50
Referee: Hassan Abed Rabbo (Lebanon)

8 March 2017
10:00

Iraq	2–2 (a.e.t.)	Qatar
Naji 8'; Al-Jassim 11' (o.g.)	Report	Daoud 14', 28'
Penalties
Hatem (penalty scored); Naji (penalty scored); Abdulzahra (penalty scored)	3–2	(penalty scored) Al-Romaihi; (penalty scored) Jafar; (penalty missed) Al-Enazi

Pantai Batu Buruk, Kuala Terengganu
Attendance: 70
Referee: Li Qibin (China)
8 March 2017
11:30

Japan	4–5	United Arab Emirates
Moreira 6'; Goto 21', 29' (pen.); Oba 36'	Report	Karim 23'; Almuntaser 24'; A. Mohammad 25'; Mohamed 31'; A. Salem 36'

Pantai Batu Buruk, Kuala Terengganu
Attendance: 80
Referee: Suhaimi Bin Mat Hassan (Malaysia)

=== Ranking of second-placed teams ===
To ensure equality in comparing the group runners-up, the matches against the fourth-placed and fifth-placed teams in Group A and the match against the fourth-placed team in Group C are discarded.

Pos	Grp	Team	Pld	W	W+	WP	L	GF	GA	GD	Pts	Qualification
1	C	Japan	2	1	0	0	1	15	7	+8	3	Knockout stage
2	B	Oman	2	1	0	0	1	6	6	0	3	
3	A	Bahrain	2	1	0	0	1	8	9	−1	3	

Source: AFC
Rules for classification: 1) Points; 2) Total goal difference; 3) Total goals scored; 4) Disciplinary points; 5) Drawing of lots (Regulations Article 10.6).

== Knockout stage ==
=== Bracket ===
The semi-final matchups are determined by the identity of the best runner-up:

- If best runner-up from Group A: Winner Group A vs. Winner Group C; Winner Group B vs. Runner-up Group A
- If best runner-up from Group B: Winner Group A vs. Winner Group B; Winner Group C vs. Runner-up Group B
- If best runner-up from Group C: Winner Group C vs. Winner Group B; Winner Group A vs. Runner-up Group C

Semi-finals
10 March
United Arab Emirates (p)	4 (2)
Lebanon	4 (1)
10 March
Iran	8
Japan	6

Final
11 March
United Arab Emirates	2
Iran	7
3rd place
11 March
Lebanon	3
Japan	6

=== Semi-finals ===
Winners qualify for 2017 FIFA Beach Soccer World Cup.

10 March 2017
15:00

United Arab Emirates	4–4 (a.e.t.)	Lebanon
A. Salem 5' (pen.); Mohamed 20'; A. Mohammad 24', 27'	Report	Grada 5'; Mo. Matar 24'; Merhi 25', 25'
Penalties
Mohamed (penalty scored); Almuntaser (penalty scored)	2–1	(penalty missed) Al Zein; (penalty scored) Merhi; (penalty missed) Fattal

Pantai Batu Buruk, Kuala Terengganu
Attendance: 300
Referee: Turki' Abdullah Said Al Salehi (Oman)
10 March 2017
16:30

Iran	8–6	Japan
Ahmadzadeh 4', 27'; Mesigar 11'; Mokhtari 12' (pen.), 23'; Abdollahi 14', 33'; Nazem 31'	Report	Goto 3', 36'; Akaguma 9', 29'; Oba 11'; Moreira 13'

Pantai Batu Buruk, Kuala Terengganu
Attendance: 410
Referee: Bakhtiyor Namazov (Uzbekistan)

=== Third place match ===
Winner qualifies for 2017 FIFA Beach Soccer World Cup.

11 March 2017
14:00

Lebanon	3–6	Japan
Fattal 16', 28'; Merhi 25'	Report	Goto 2', 16', 27', 36'; Haraguchi 12'; Oba 31'

Pantai Batu Buruk, Kuala Terengganu
Attendance: 340
Referee: Ebrahim Yousef Almansoori (United Arab Emirates)

=== Final ===
11 March 2017
16:00

United Arab Emirates	2–7	Iran
Jamal 20'; Mohamed 22'	Report	Mesigar 2', 18'; Hosseini 3'; Mokhtari 10', 35'; Akbari 24'; Nazem 32'

Pantai Batu Buruk, Kuala Terengganu
Attendance: 640
Referee: Shao Liang (China)

== Awards ==
=== Winners ===
2017 AFC Beach Soccer
champions

Iran
Second title

=== Individual awards ===
The following awards were given at the conclusion of the tournament.

Most valuable player
(Iran) Mohammad Ali Mokhtari
Top scorer
(Iran) Mohammad Ali Mokhtari (12 goals)
Fair play award
Iran

== Top goalscorers ==
12 goals

- (Iran) Mohammad Ali Mokhtari

11 goals

- (Japan) Takasuke Goto

9 goals

- (Afghanistan) Raof Qaderi
- (Iran) Farid Boulokbashi

8 goals

- (Japan) Takaaki Oba

7 goals

- (Iran) Moslem Mesigar
- (Japan) Takuya Akaguya
- (Japan) Ozu Moreira

6 goals

- (Iran) Ali Nazem
- (Lebanon) Mohamad Merhi

Source: AFC

== Final ranking ==
Qualified for the 2017 FIFA Beach Soccer World Cup

Rank	Team
1st place, gold medalist(s)	Iran
2nd place, silver medalist(s)	United Arab Emirates
3rd place, bronze medalist(s)	Japan
4	Lebanon
5–12	Afghanistan
5–12	Bahrain
5–12	China
5–12	Iraq
5–12	Malaysia
5–12	Oman
5–12	Qatar
5–12	Thailand

== Summary ==
Rank	Team	M	W	WE	WP	L	GF	GA	GD	Points
1	Iran	6	6	0	0	0	50	11	+39	18
2	United Arab Emirates	5	3	0	1	1	25	16	+9	10
3	Japan	5	3	0	0	2	41	18	+23	9
4	Lebanon	4	2	0	0	2	17	14	+3	6
5	Bahrain	4	3	0	0	1	19	14	+5	9
6	Afghanistan	4	2	0	0	2	17	17	0	6
7	Oman	2	1	0	0	1	6	6	0	3
8	Malaysia	4	1	0	0	3	10	26	-16	3
9	Iraq	3	0	0	1	2	4	19	-15	1
10	Thailand	2	0	0	0	2	3	9	-6	0
11	Qatar	3	0	0	0	3	3	24	-21	0
12	China	4	0	0	0	4	3	24	-21	0

== Qualified teams for FIFA Beach Soccer World Cup ==
The following three teams from AFC qualified for the 2017 FIFA Beach Soccer World Cup.

Team	Qualified on	Previous appearances in tournament^{1} only FIFA-sanctioned era (since 2005)
Iran	10 March 2017	6 (2006, 2007, 2008, 2011, 2013, 2015)
United Arab Emirates	10 March 2017	4 (2007, 2008, 2009, 2013)
Japan	11 March 2017	8 (2005, 2006, 2007, 2008, 2009, 2011, 2013, 2015)

^{1} Bold indicates champion for that year. Italic indicates host for that year.
