= 2008 AFC Beach Soccer Championship =

Beach soccer championship

2008 FIFA Beach Soccer World Cup qualifiers for (AFC)

Tournament details
- Host country: United Arab Emirates
- City: Dubai
- Dates: 6–10 May
- Teams: 6 (from 1 confederation)
- Venue: 1 (in 1 host city)

Final positions
- Champions: United Arab Emirates (2nd title)
- Runners-up: Japan
- Third place: Iran
- Fourth place: China

Tournament statistics
- Matches played: 10
- Goals scored: 63 (6.3 per match)

The 2008 AFC Beach Soccer Championship, also known as the 2008 FIFA Beach Soccer World Cup qualifiers for (AFC), was the third beach soccer championship for Asia, held in May 2008, in Dubai, United Arab Emirates. The United Arab Emirates won the championship, with Japan finishing second and Iran winning the third place-play off, to claim third. The three teams moved on to play in the 2008 FIFA Beach Soccer World Cup in Marseille, France, from 17 July – 28 July.

== Participating nations ==
- China
- Iran
- Japan
- Philippines
- United Arab Emirates
- Uzbekistan

== Group stage ==
=== Group A ===
Team	Pts	Pld	W	W+	L	GF	GA	GD
United Arab Emirates	6	2	2	0	0	11	2	+9
China	3	2	1	0	1	4	8	-4
Uzbekistan	0	2	0	0	2	5	10	-5

6 May 2008

United Arab Emirates	6–2	Uzbekistan

Dubai

7 May 2008

China	4–3	Uzbekistan

Dubai

8 May 2008

United Arab Emirates	5–0	China

Dubai

=== Group B ===
Team	Pts	Pld	W	W+	L	GF	GA	GD
Japan	5	2	1	1	0	9	3	+6
Iran	3	2	1	0	1	6	3	+3
Philippines	0	2	0	0	2	4	13	-9

6 May 2008

Japan	8–2	Philippines

Dubai

7 May 2008

Iran	5–2	Philippines

Dubai

8 May 2008

Japan	1–1 (Japan win on penalties)	Iran

Dubai

== Knockout stage ==
Semi-finals
9 May 2008
UAE	3
Iran	1
9 May 2008
Japan	7
China	1

Final
10 May 2008
UAE	4
Japan	3
Third place
10 May 2008
Iran	4
China	1

== Winners ==
(2008) FIFA Beach Soccer World Cup
Qualification (AFC) Winners:

United Arab Emirates
Second title

== Final standings ==
Rank	Team
1	United Arab Emirates
2	Japan
3	Iran
4	China
5	Uzbekistan
6	Philippines
