= 2015 AFC Beach Soccer Championship =

2015 FIFA Beach Soccer World Cup Qualification (AFC)

Tournament details
- Host country: Qatar
- Dates: 23–28 March
- Teams: 14 (from 1 confederation)
- Venue: 1 (in 1 host city)

Final positions
- Champions: Oman (1st title)
- Runners-up: Japan
- Third place: Iran
- Fourth place: Lebanon

Tournament statistics
- Matches played: 30
- Goals scored: 228 (7.6 per match)
- Attendance: 11,131 (371 per match)
- Top scorer(s): (Vietnam) Bùi Trần Tuấn Anh (Japan) Takasuke Goto (Japan) Moreira Ozu (8 goals each)
- Best player: (Japan) Moreira Ozu
- Best goalkeeper: (Iran) Seyed Peyman Hosseini

The 2015 AFC Beach Soccer Championship was a beach soccer tournament which took place in Doha, Qatar on 23–28 March 2015. This was the second consecutive time that the AFC Beach Soccer Championship was held in Doha. All matches were played at the Katara Beach.

The tournament served as the FIFA Beach Soccer World Cup qualifier for teams from Asia which are members of AFC, where the top three teams qualified for the 2015 FIFA Beach Soccer World Cup in Portugal. In the final, Oman defeated Japan to be crowned champions, and both teams together with third place Iran qualified for the 2015 FIFA Beach Soccer World Cup.

== Participating teams and draw ==
The following 15 teams entered the tournament. Palestine initially entered but then had to withdraw.

- Bahrain
- China
- Iran
- Iraq
- Japan
- Kuwait
- Lebanon
- Laos
- Oman
- Palestine (withdrew)
- Qatar (hosts)
- Thailand
- United Arab Emirates
- Uzbekistan
- Vietnam

The draw of the tournament was held on 18 February 2015 at Doha, Qatar. The 15 teams were drawn into three groups of four teams and one group of three teams.

== Group stage ==
Each team earns three points for a win in regulation time, two points for a win in extra time, one point for a win in a penalty shoot-out, and no points for a defeat.

Legend
The top two teams from each group advance to the quarter-finals

All times are local, Arabia Standard Time (UTC+3).

=== Group A ===
Pos	Team	Pld	W	WE	WP	L	GF	GA	GD	Pts	Qualification
1	Oman	3	3	0	0	0	19	5	+14	9	Knockout stage
2	Bahrain	3	2	0	0	1	16	6	+10	6	Knockout stage
3	Laos	3	1	0	0	2	11	21	−10	3	
4	Qatar (H)	3	0	0	0	3	6	20	−14	0	

Source: AFC
Rules for classification: 1) Points; 2) Points obtained in head-to-head matches; 3) Goal difference in head-to-head matches; 4) Goals scored in head-to-head matches; 5) Total goal difference; 6) Total goals scored; 7) Drawing of lots.
(H) Host
23 March 2015
15:00

Oman	3–2	Bahrain
Hani Al-Dhabit 11'; Jalal Al-Sinani 18'; Yahya Al-Araimi 36'	Report 1 Report 2	Naseeb Salem 21'; Mohamed Alabdulla 31'

Katara Beach, Doha
Attendance: 135
Referee: Abdulaziz M A Abdullah (Kuwait)
23 March 2015
18:45

Qatar	5–6	Laos
Hamad Ali Al-Sharqi 5', 20'; Jafal Rashid M Al-Kuwari 17'; Mohamed Hashim Idrees 19'; Nanthaly Savatdy 21' (o.g.)	Report 1 Report 2	Chiew Nonmany 3', 16', 31'; Souksakhone Bountathip 7', 29'; Tona Bounmalay 29'

Katara Beach, Doha
Attendance: 500
Referee: Suhaimi Bin Mat Hassan (Malaysia)

24 March 2015
15:00

Laos	3–8	Oman
Chiew Nonmany 16'; Nanthaly Savatdy 29', 30'	Report 1 Report 2	Yahya Al-Araimi 2', 15'; Abdullah Masoud Salim 18'; Hani Al-Dhabit 20'; Ghaith Abdullah Subait 23', 35'; Tona Bounmalay 23' (o.g.); Mundhar Al-Araimi 33' (pen.)

Katara Beach, Doha
Attendance: 212
Referee: Seyed Ramin Haghighizade (Iran)
24 March 2015
18:45

Bahrain	6–1	Qatar
Abdulla Abdullatif Mohamed Alabdulla 6', 29'; Rashed Jamal 17', 25', 30'; Jasim Rashed Mubarak 24'	Report 1 Report 2	Jafal Rashid M Al-Kuwari 30'

Katara Beach, Doha
Attendance: 300
Referee: Suwat Wongsuwan (Thailand)

25 March 2015
15:00

Bahrain	8–2	Laos
Rashed Jamal 5', 17'; Thani Salem Thani 9'; Ayoob Naseeb Salem 27', 29', 31'; Ebrahim Hasan Ali Naser 34'; Abdulla Abdullatif Mohamed Alabdulla 34'	Report 1 Report 2	Tona Bounmalay 9'; Vatsana Sisoulath 34'

Katara Beach, Doha
Attendance: 137
Referee: Masahiro Sakurada (Japan)
25 March 2015
18:45

Qatar	0–8	Oman
	Report 1 Report 2	Yahya Al-Araimi 8'; Ghaith Abdullah Subait 12', 15', 34', 34'; Abdullah Masoud Salim 16'; Hani Al-Dhabit 26'; Yaqoob Al-Alawi 29'

Katara Beach, Doha
Attendance: 165
Referee: Hassan Abed Rabbo (Lebanon)

=== Group B ===
Pos	Team	Pld	W	WE	WP	L	GF	GA	GD	Pts	Qualification
1	Japan	3	3	0	0	0	13	5	+8	9	Knockout stage
2	China	3	1	0	1	1	9	13	−4	4	Knockout stage
3	Kuwait	3	1	0	0	2	12	13	−1	3	
4	Vietnam	3	0	0	0	3	11	14	−3	0	

Source: AFC
Rules for classification: 1) Points; 2) Points obtained in head-to-head matches; 3) Goal difference in head-to-head matches; 4) Goals scored in head-to-head matches; 5) Total goal difference; 6) Total goals scored; 7) Drawing of lots.
23 March 2015
16:15

China	5–5 (a.e.t.)	Vietnam
Liu Yisi 1', 24'; Chen Xiaowei 7'; Wan Chao 25', 32'	Report 1 Report 2	Bùi Trần Tuấn Anh 3', 4' (pen.), 11', 23', 26' (pen.)
Penalties
Wan Chao (penalty scored); Chen Xiaowei (penalty scored); Liu Yisi (penalty scored)	3–2	(penalty scored) Phùng Ngọc Vĩnh Quý; (penalty scored) Bùi Trần Tuấn Anh; (penalty missed) Nguyễn Thanh Đạt

Katara Beach, Doha
Attendance: 350
Referee: Akbarpour Asghar (Iran)
23 March 2015
17:30

Japan	5–3	Kuwait
Takasuke Goto 5', 13' (pen.); Ozu Moreira 11', 12', 21'	Report 1 Report 2	Ali Al-Saif 8', 12'; Abdulatif Al-Hamad 12'

Katara Beach, Doha
Attendance: 157
Referee: Ebrahim Al-Mansoori (United Arab Emirates)

24 March 2015
16:15

Kuwait	3–4	China
Mohammad Bu-Abbas 2'; Ali Al-Saif 18'; Mohammed Hajeyah 31'	Report 1 Report 2	Wan Chao 2'; Liu Yisi 24'; Cai Weiming 25', 33'

Katara Beach, Doha
Attendance: 300
Referee: Turki Al-Salehi (Oman)
24 March 2015
17:30

Vietnam	2–3	Japan
Lê Ngọc Phước 27'; Trần Vĩnh Phong 30'	Report 1 Report 2	Takasuke Goto 2'; Ozu Moreira 4'; Takuya Akaguma 11'

Katara Beach, Doha
Attendance: 208
Referee: Ahmed Mohamed Obaid (United Arab Emirates)

25 March 2015
13:45

Vietnam	4–6	Kuwait
Trần Vĩnh Phong 9'; Bùi Trần Tuấn Anh 16', 17', 35'	Report 1 Report 2	Ali Al-Saif 8', 19', 26'; Abdulatif Al-Hamad 10', 23'; Mohammad Bu-Abbas 14'

Katara Beach, Doha
Attendance: 200
Referee: Wan Mohamad Tarmizi Bin Wan Ibrahim (Malaysia)
25 March 2015
17:30

Japan	5–0	China
Takuya Akaguma 2'; Takasuke Goto 15', 34', 36'; Ozu Moreira 33'	Report 1 Report 2

Katara Beach, Doha
Attendance: 500
Referee: Abdulla Saleh Qasim Saleh (Bahrain)

=== Group C ===
Pos	Team	Pld	W	WE	WP	L	GF	GA	GD	Pts	Qualification
1	Uzbekistan	2	2	0	0	0	12	6	+6	6	Knockout stage
2	United Arab Emirates	2	1	0	0	1	12	11	+1	3	Knockout stage
3	Iraq	2	0	0	0	2	6	13	−7	0	
4	Palestine	0	0	0	0	0	0	0	0	0	Withdrew (Note: Palestine were not able to take part in the competition due to "administrative issues outside of the event".)

Source: AFC
Rules for classification: 1) Points; 2) Points obtained in head-to-head matches; 3) Goal difference in head-to-head matches; 4) Goals scored in head-to-head matches; 5) Total goal difference; 6) Total goals scored; 7) Drawing of lots.
Notes:
23 March 2015
12:30

United Arab Emirates	7–5	Iraq
Hasan Ali 2', 4', 12'; Adel Ali 5'; Ali Hassan Karim 13', 17', 29'	Report 1 Report 2	Ali Joudah Habeeb 3'; Abdullah Suhail 19', 21'; Hussein Jabar 27', 32' (pen.)

Katara Beach, Doha
Attendance: 200
Referee: Suwat Wongsuwan (Thailand)
23 March 2015
13:45

Palestine	Cancelled	Uzbekistan

Katara Beach, Doha

24 March 2015
12:30

Uzbekistan	6–5	United Arab Emirates
Haitham Mohamed 20' (o.g.); Jafar Irismetov 21', 33', 33'; Tokhir Abdurazzakov 24'; Sarvar Kholmurodov 31'	Report 1 Report 2	Ali Mohammad 10', 31'; Mohamed Muftah 24'; Ali Hassan Karim 25'; Haitham Mohamed 30'

Katara Beach, Doha
Attendance: 150
Referee: Masahiro Sakurada (Japan)
24 March 2015
13:45

Iraq	Cancelled	Palestine

Katara Beach, Doha

25 March 2015
12:30

Uzbekistan	6–1	Iraq
Feruz Fakhriddinov 2'; Jamoliddin Sharipov 4', 15'; Sarvar Kholmurodov 11', 16'; Jafar Irismetov 22'	Report 1 Report 2	Hussein Jabar 33'

Katara Beach, Doha
Attendance: 76
Referee: Akbarpour Ebrahim Asghar (Iran)
25 March 2015
16:15

United Arab Emirates	Cancelled	Palestine

Katara Beach, Doha

=== Group D ===
Pos	Team	Pld	W	WE	WP	L	GF	GA	GD	Pts	Qualification
1	Iran	2	2	0	0	0	11	3	+8	6	Knockout stage
2	Lebanon	2	0	1	0	1	5	5	0	2	Knockout stage
3	Thailand	2	0	0	0	2	3	11	−8	0	

Source: AFC
Rules for classification: 1) Points; 2) Points obtained in head-to-head matches; 3) Goal difference in head-to-head matches; 4) Goals scored in head-to-head matches; 5) Total goal difference; 6) Total goals scored; 7) Drawing of lots.
23 March 2015
20:00

Iran	3–2	Lebanon
Mohammadali Sadeghi 13'; Farid Boulokbashi 29' (pen.); Mohammad Ahmadzadeh 35'	Report 1 Report 2	Ahmed Grada 8'; Mohamad Halawi 35'

Katara Beach, Doha
Attendance: 525
Referee: Bakhtiyor Namazov (Uzbekistan)

24 March 2015
20:00

Thailand	2–3 (a.e.t.)	Lebanon
Komkrit Nanan 1', 18'	Report 1 Report 2	Haitham Fattal 1', 2'; Mohamad Halawi 37'

Katara Beach, Doha
Attendance: 253
Referee: Shao Liang (China)

25 March 2015
20:00

Iran	8–1	Thailand
Seyed Peyman Hosseini 3'; Farid Boulokbashi 4', 17'; Hassan Abdollahi 8'; Mohammadali Sadeghi 8'; Mohammad Moradi Farahabadi 19', 33'; Naderi Hossein Abadi Ali 34'	Report 1 Report 2	Vitoon Tapinna 23'

Katara Beach, Doha
Attendance: 600
Referee: Abdullah Ali Mohamed (Oman)

== Knockout stage ==
=== Bracket ===
Quarter-finals
26 March
Uzbekistan	1
Lebanon	6
26 March
Oman	7
China	2
26 March
Iran	6
United Arab Emirates	1
26 March
Japan	5
Bahrain	2

Semi-finals
27 March
Lebanon	4
Oman (a.e.t.)	5
27 March
Iran	4
Japan	5

Final
28 March
Oman (p)	1 (3)
Japan	1 (2)
Third place
28 March
Lebanon	3
Iran	8

Fifth Place Semi-finals
27 March
Uzbekistan	3
China	4
27 March
United Arab Emirates	2
Bahrain	1

Fifth Place
28 March
China	1
United Arab Emirates	5
Seventh Place
28 March
Uzbekistan	2
Bahrain (a.e.t.)	3

=== Quarter-finals ===
26 March 2015
16:15

Uzbekistan	1–6	Lebanon
Ganisher Kholmurodov 20'	Report 1 Report 2	Mohamad Merhi 8', 13'; Haitham Fattal 24', 27', 33'; Mohamed Choker 26'

Katara Beach, Doha
Attendance: 300
Referee: Abdulaziz M A Abdullah (Kuwait)
26 March 2015
17:30

Iran	6–1	United Arab Emirates
Mehran Morshedizadeh 7'; Seyed Peyman Hosseini 15'; Amir Hosein Akbari 27'; Mohammad Ahmadzadeh 28'; Naderi Hossein Abadi Ali 30'; Farid Boulokbashi 34' (pen.)	Report 1 Report 2	Ali Hassan Karim 4'

Katara Beach, Doha
Attendance: 475
Referee: Suwat Wongsuwan (Thailand)
26 March 2015
18:45

Oman	7–2	China
Hani Al-Dhabit 3'; Khalid Al-Oraimi 12', 29', 31'; Yahya Al-Araimi 15'; Jalal Al-Sinani 20'; Ghaith Abdullah Subait 24'	Report 1 Report 2	Cai Weiming 3'; Wan Chao 27'

Katara Beach, Doha
Attendance: 250
Referee: Suhaimi Bin Mat Hassan (Malaysia)
26 March 2015
20:00

Japan	5–2	Bahrain
Takaaki Oba 13'; Ozu Moreira 23'; Hirofumi Oda 29'; Shinji Makino 30'; Salman Khaled 35' (o.g.)	Report 1 Report 2	Rashed Jamal 2'; Ayoob Naseeb Salem 33'

Katara Beach, Doha
Attendance: 237
Referee: Abdullah Ali Mohamed (Oman)

=== Fifth place semi-finals ===
27 March 2015
16:15

Uzbekistan	3–4	China
Jamoliddin Sharipov 15', 17'; Sarvar Kholmurodov 18'	Report 1 Report 2	Wan Chao 12'; Cai Weiming 18'; Hao Minhui 22'; Wen Tingyuan 28'

Katara Beach, Doha
Attendance: 250
Referee: Abdullah Ali Mohamed (Oman)
27 March 2015
17:30

United Arab Emirates	2–1	Bahrain
Hasan Ali 16'; Ali Hassan Karim 35'	Report 1 Report 2	Salman Khaled 17'

Katara Beach, Doha
Attendance: 437
Referee: Akbarpour Ebrahim Asghar (Iran)

=== Semi-finals ===
27 March 2015
18:45

Lebanon	4–5 (a.e.t.)	Oman
Haitham Fattal 17'; Ahmed Grada 27', 34'; Mohamad Merhi 34'	Report 1 Report 2	Yahya Al-Araimi 16', 39'; Khalid Al-Oraimi 18'; Mundhar Al-Araimi 32'; Mohamad Merhi 34' (o.g.)

Katara Beach, Doha
Attendance: 1,200
Referee: Bakhtiyor Namazov (Uzbekistan)
27 March 2015
20:00

Iran	4–5	Japan
Hassan Abdollahi 8', 20'; Mohammad Ahmadzadeh 12'; Mostafa Kiani 35'	Report 1 Report 2	Hirofumi Oda 15'; Shusei Yamauchi 16'; Takasuke Goto 17', 20'; Ozu Moreira 32'

Katara Beach, Doha
Attendance: 521
Referee: Shao Liang (China)

=== Seventh place match ===
28 March 2015
16:15

Uzbekistan	2–3 (a.e.t.)	Bahrain
Jafar Irismetov 6', 11'	Report 1 Report 2	Mohamed Ashoor 8'; Salman Khaled 30'; Thani Salem Thani 38'

Katara Beach, Doha
Attendance: 261
Referee: Abdulaziz M A Abdullah (Kuwait)

=== Fifth place match ===
28 March 2015
15:00

China	1–5	United Arab Emirates
Fu Xiaojun 29'	Report 1 Report 2	Ali Hassan Karim 4'; Haitham Mohamed 6', 12', 25'; Mohamed Muftah 16'

Katara Beach, Doha
Attendance: 100
Referee: Abdulla Saleh Qasim Saleh (Bahrain)

=== Third place match ===
28 March 2015
17:30

Lebanon	3–8	Iran
Mohamed Choker 17'; Haitham Fattal 20'; Mohamad Merhi 26'	Report 1 Report 2	Mohammad Moradi Farahabadi 9'; Mohammadali Mokhtari 12'; Naderi Hossein Abadi Ali 13', 29'; Mohammad Ahmadzadeh 15', 21', 28', 33'

Katara Beach, Doha
Attendance: 932
Referee: Wan Mohamad Tarmizi Bin Wan Ibrahim (Malaysia)

=== Final ===
28 March 2015
20:00

Oman	1–1 (a.e.t.)	Japan
Hani Al-Dhabit 2'	Report 1 Report 2	Ozu Moreira 23'
Penalties
Hani Al-Dhabit (penalty scored); Mundhar Al-Araimi (penalty scored); Abdullah Masoud Salim (penalty scored)	3–2	(penalty scored) Ozu Moreira; (penalty scored) Shinji Makino; (penalty missed) Takasuke Goto

Katara Beach, Doha
Attendance: 1,200
Referee: Bakhtiyor Namazov (Uzbekistan)

== Final ranking ==
Qualified for 2015 FIFA Beach Soccer World Cup

Rank	Team
1st place, gold medalist(s)	Oman
2nd place, silver medalist(s)	Japan
3rd place, bronze medalist(s)	Iran
4	Lebanon
5	United Arab Emirates
6	China
7	Bahrain
8	Uzbekistan
9–14	Iraq
9–14	Kuwait
9–14	Laos
9–14	Qatar
9–14	Thailand
9–14	Vietnam

== Awards ==
Best Player (MVP)	Top Scorer(s)	Best Goalkeeper
(Japan) Moreira Ozu	(Japan) Takasuke Goto	(Iran) Peyman Hosseini

Note: Goto won top scorer award based on tiebreaker.

== Top goalscorers ==
8 goals

- (Japan) Takasuke Goto
- (Japan) Moreira Ozu
- (Vietnam) Bùi Trần Tuấn Anh

7 goals

- (Iran) Mohammad Ahmadzadeh
- (Lebanon) Haitham Fattal
- (Oman) Yahya Al-Araimi
- (Oman) Ghaith Abdullah Subait
- (United Arab Emirates) Ali Hassan Karim

6 goals

- (Bahrain) Rashed Jamal
- (Kuwait) Ali Al-Saif

Source: the-AFC.com
