= FIFA Beach Soccer World Cup records and statistics =

List of national teams that appeared in FIFA Beach soccer cup events

This is a list of records and statistics of the FIFA Beach Soccer World Cup, including the Beach Soccer World Cup events held before FIFA sanctioning in 2005.

== Debut of national teams ==
| Year | Debuting teams | | | Successor teams |
| Year | Teams | No. | Cum. | Successor teams |
|---|---|---|---|---|
| 1995 | Argentina, Brazil, England, Germany, Italy, Netherlands, United States, Uruguay | 8 | 8 | |
| 1996 | Canada, Denmark, Russia | 3 | 11 | |
| 1997 | France, Japan, Portugal | 3 | 14 | |
| 1998 | Chile, Peru, Spain | 3 | 17 | |
| 1999 | Malaysia, South Africa | 2 | 19 | |
| 2000 | Venezuela | 1 | 20 | |
| 2001 | Turkey | 1 | 21 | |
| 2002 | Thailand | 1 | 22 | |
| 2003 | None | 0 | 22 | |
| 2004 | Belgium, Switzerland | 2 | 24 | |
| 2005 | Australia, Ukraine | 2 | 26 | |
| 2006 | Bahrain, Cameroon, Iran, Nigeria, Poland, Solomon Islands | 6 | 32 | |
| 2007 | Mexico, Senegal, United Arab Emirates | 3 | 35 | |
| 2008 | El Salvador | 1 | 36 | |
| 2009 | Costa Rica, Ivory Coast | 2 | 38 | |
| 2011 | Oman, Tahiti | 2 | 40 | |
| 2013 | Paraguay | 1 | 41 | |
| 2015 | Madagascar | 1 | 42 | |
| 2017 | Bahamas, Ecuador, Panama | 3 | 45 | |
| 2019 | Belarus | 1 | 46 | |
| 2021 | Mozambique | 1 | 47 | |
| 2024 | Colombia, Egypt | 2 | 49 | |
| 2025 | Mauritania, Seychelles, Guatemala | 3 | 52 | |

== Overall team records (2005–present) ==
In this ranking 3 points are awarded for a win in normal time, 2 points for a win in extra time, 1 point is awarded for a win in penalty shoot-out and 0 for a loss. Teams are ranked by total points, then by goal difference, then by goals scored. Only the points from the 2005 tournament onward are counted.

As of 2024 FIFA Beach Soccer World Cup

| Rank | Team | Part | Pld | W | W+ | Wp | L | GF | GA | GD | Pts |
|---|---|---|---|---|---|---|---|---|---|---|---|
| 1 | Brazil | 12 | 65 | 53 | 2 | 3 | 7 | 405 | 196 | +209 | 166 |
| 2 | Portugal | 11 | 56 | 32 | 3 | 4 | 17 | 304 | 193 | +111 | 106 |
| 3 | Russia | 8 | 41 | 26 | 3 | 2 | 10 | 199 | 134 | +65 | 86 |
| 4 | Italy | 9 | 38 | 16 | 2 | 4 | 16 | 171 | 140 | +31 | 56 |
| 5 | Japan | 12 | 46 | 17 | 2 | 1 | 26 | 170 | 205 | −35 | 56 |
| 6 | Spain | 9 | 36 | 17 | 0 | 0 | 19 | 149 | 136 | +10 | 51 |
| 7 | Uruguay | 7 | 32 | 14 | 2 | 1 | 15 | 125 | 130 | −5 | 47 |
| 8 | Switzerland | 6 | 27 | 14 | 1 | 2 | 10 | 150 | 127 | +23 | 46 |
| 9 | Tahiti | 7 | 30 | 14 | 1 | 2 | 13 | 141 | 141 | 0 | 46 |
| 10 | Senegal | 9 | 34 | 13 | 2 | 2 | 17 | 166 | 141 | +25 | 45 |
| 11 | Argentina | 9 | 30 | 14 | 0 | 1 | 15 | 96 | 103 | −7 | 43 |
| 12 | Iran | 9 | 36 | 12 | 1 | 2 | 21 | 140 | 148 | −8 | 40 |
| 13 | France | 4 | 21 | 12 | 0 | 3 | 6 | 97 | 67 | +30 | 39 |
| 14 | United Arab Emirates | 8 | 25 | 5 | 2 | 2 | 16 | 72 | 88 | −16 | 21 |
| 15 | Nigeria | 6 | 20 | 5 | 1 | 2 | 12 | 88 | 119 | −31 | 19 |
| 16 | Paraguay | 5 | 16 | 6 | 0 | 0 | 10 | 76 | 71 | +5 | 18 |
| 17 | Mexico | 7 | 25 | 5 | 0 | 2 | 18 | 60 | 107 | −47 | 17 |
| 18 | Belarus | 3 | 12 | 4 | 1 | 1 | 6 | 39 | 48 | −9 | 15 |
| 19 | El Salvador | 5 | 19 | 4 | 1 | 0 | 14 | 63 | 98 | −35 | 14 |
| 20 | Oman | 5 | 15 | 4 | 0 | 0 | 11 | 45 | 64 | −18 | 12 |
| 21 | Solomon Islands | 5 | 15 | 4 | 0 | 0 | 11 | 55 | 105 | −50 | 12 |
| 22 | Ukraine | 3 | 9 | 3 | 0 | 0 | 6 | 32 | 28 | +4 | 9 |
| 23 | United States | 7 | 20 | 3 | 0 | 0 | 17 | 64 | 106 | −42 | 9 |
| 24 | Canada | 1 | 4 | 1 | 0 | 1 | 2 | 12 | 26 | −14 | 4 |
| 25 | Bahrain | 2 | 7 | 1 | 0 | 1 | 5 | 21 | 38 | −17 | 4 |
| 26 | Mozambique | 1 | 3 | 1 | 0 | 0 | 2 | 15 | 18 | −3 | 3 |
| 27 | Bahamas | 1 | 3 | 1 | 0 | 0 | 2 | 7 | 14 | −7 | 3 |
| 28 | Ivory Coast | 2 | 6 | 1 | 0 | 0 | 5 | 26 | 37 | −11 | 3 |
| 29 | Poland | 2 | 6 | 1 | 0 | 0 | 5 | 24 | 42 | −18 | 3 |
| 30 | Egypt | 1 | 3 | 0 | 1 | 0 | 2 | 8 | 12 | −4 | 2 |
| 31 | Netherlands | 1 | 3 | 0 | 0 | 1 | 2 | 6 | 12 | −6 | 1 |
| 32 | Cameroon | 2 | 6 | 0 | 0 | 1 | 5 | 12 | 35 | −23 | 1 |
| 33 | Madagascar | 1 | 3 | 0 | 0 | 0 | 3 | 7 | 12 | −5 | 0 |
| 34 | Colombia | 1 | 3 | 0 | 0 | 0 | 3 | 6 | 12 | −6 | 0 |
| 35 | Australia | 1 | 2 | 0 | 0 | 0 | 2 | 2 | 8 | −6 | 0 |
| 36 | Venezuela | 1 | 3 | 0 | 0 | 0 | 3 | 8 | 17 | −9 | 0 |
| 37 | Panama | 1 | 3 | 0 | 0 | 0 | 3 | 4 | 14 | −10 | 0 |
| 38 | Thailand | 1 | 2 | 0 | 0 | 0 | 2 | 3 | 13 | −10 | 0 |
| 39 | South Africa | 1 | 2 | 0 | 0 | 0 | 2 | 4 | 15 | −11 | 0 |
| 40 | Ecuador | 1 | 3 | 0 | 0 | 0 | 3 | 6 | 22 | −16 | 0 |
| 41 | Costa Rica | 2 | 6 | 0 | 0 | 0 | 6 | 8 | 31 | −23 | 0 |

== Overall team records (total) ==
In this ranking 3 points are awarded for a win in normal time, 2 points for a win in extra time, 1 point is awarded for a win in penalty shoot-out and 0 for a loss. Teams are ranked by total points, then by goal difference, then by goals scored.

The following table shows the overall statistics of all 21 world cups, combining the results of both the Beach Soccer World Cup era and the FIFA Beach Soccer World Cup era.

Notes:
- FIFA issued changes to the rules of beach soccer in July 2014 meaning teams now earn 1 point for a penalty shootout win; teams were awarded 2 points for a shootout win prior to July 2014. For the purpose of this table, the calculation of points earned goes by the current rules meaning that penalty shootout wins that occurred both after and before the 2014 rule change have been counted as just 1 point in the "Pts" column.

As of 2021 FIFA Beach Soccer World Cup

| Rank | Team | Part | Pld | W | W+ | Wp | L | GF | GA | GD | Pts |
|---|---|---|---|---|---|---|---|---|---|---|---|
| 1 | Brazil | 21 | 109 | 97 | 0 | 3 | 9 | 798 | 301 | +497 | 294 |
| 2 | Portugal | 18 | 87 | 53 | 4 | 4 | 26 | 465 | 301 | +164 | 171 |
| 3 | Uruguay | 17 | 71 | 30 | 3 | 4 | 34 | 280 | 285 | –5 | 100 |
| 4 | Spain | 15 | 60 | 31 | 1 | 0 | 28 | 242 | 228 | +14 | 95 |
| 5 | Russia | 9 | 44 | 27 | 3 | 2 | 12 | 206 | 144 | +62 | 89 |
| 6 | Italy | 18 | 68 | 25 | 2 | 4 | 37 | 278 | 309 | –31 | 79 |
| 7 | France | 12 | 50 | 23 | 0 | 4 | 23 | 212 | 221 | –9 | 73 |
| 8 | Argentina | 16 | 57 | 23 | 0 | 1 | 33 | 167 | 211 | –44 | 70 |
| 9 | Japan | 15 | 56 | 18 | 2 | 2 | 34 | 196 | 266 | –70 | 60 |
| 10 | United States | 15 | 50 | 18 | 0 | 0 | 32 | 169 | 233 | –64 | 54 |
| 11 | Switzerland | 7 | 30 | 15 | 1 | 2 | 12 | 159 | 144 | +15 | 49 |
| 12 | Tahiti | 6 | 28 | 14 | 1 | 2 | 11 | 127 | 125 | +2 | 46 |
| 13 | Senegal | 8 | 31 | 12 | 2 | 2 | 15 | 153 | 126 | +27 | 42 |
| 14 | Peru | 5 | 21 | 11 | 0 | 0 | 9 | 81 | 78 | +3 | 33 |
| 15 | Iran | 7 | 26 | 6 | 1 | 1 | 18 | 95 | 115 | –20 | 21 |
| 16 | Nigeria | 6 | 20 | 5 | 1 | 2 | 12 | 88 | 119 | –31 | 19 |
| 17 | Paraguay | 5 | 16 | 6 | 0 | 0 | 10 | 76 | 71 | +5 | 18 |
| 18 | Mexico | 6 | 22 | 5 | 0 | 2 | 15 | 53 | 90 | –37 | 17 |
| 19 | United Arab Emirates | 7 | 21 | 4 | 1 | 1 | 15 | 66 | 83 | –17 | 15 |
| 20 | El Salvador | 5 | 19 | 4 | 1 | 0 | 14 | 63 | 98 | –35 | 14 |
| 21 | Solomon Islands | 5 | 15 | 4 | 0 | 0 | 11 | 55 | 105 | –50 | 12 |
| 22 | Canada | 3 | 10 | 3 | 0 | 1 | 6 | 34 | 63 | –29 | 10 |
| 23 | Ukraine | 3 | 9 | 3 | 0 | 0 | 6 | 32 | 28 | +4 | 9 |
| 24 | Oman | 4 | 12 | 3 | 0 | 0 | 9 | 35 | 53 | –18 | 9 |
| 25 | England | 1 | 5 | 2 | 0 | 0 | 3 | 20 | 31 | –11 | 6 |
| 26 | Belarus | 2 | 6 | 1 | 0 | 1 | 4 | 18 | 30 | –12 | 4 |
| 27 | Bahrain | 2 | 7 | 1 | 0 | 1 | 5 | 21 | 38 | –17 | 4 |
| 28 | Thailand | 2 | 7 | 1 | 0 | 1 | 5 | 16 | 34 | –18 | 4 |
| 29 | Mozambique | 1 | 3 | 1 | 0 | 0 | 2 | 15 | 18 | –3 | 3 |
| 30 | Denmark | 1 | 3 | 1 | 0 | 0 | 2 | 10 | 16 | –6 | 3 |
| 31 | Bahamas | 1 | 3 | 1 | 0 | 0 | 2 | 7 | 14 | –7 | 3 |
| 32 | Chile | 1 | 4 | 1 | 0 | 0 | 3 | 14 | 22 | –8 | 3 |
| 33 | Ivory Coast | 2 | 6 | 1 | 0 | 0 | 5 | 26 | 37 | –11 | 3 |
| 34 | Poland | 2 | 6 | 1 | 0 | 0 | 5 | 24 | 42 | –18 | 3 |
| 35 | Venezuela | 3 | 8 | 1 | 0 | 0 | 7 | 22 | 33 | –11 | 3 |
| 36 | Germany | 4 | 9 | 1 | 0 | 0 | 8 | 22 | 56 | –34 | 3 |
| 37 | Cameroon | 2 | 6 | 0 | 0 | 1 | 5 | 12 | 35 | –23 | 1 |
| 38 | Netherlands | 2 | 6 | 0 | 0 | 1 | 5 | 13 | 42 | –29 | 1 |
| 39 | Turkey | 1 | 2 | 0 | 0 | 0 | 2 | 1 | 5 | –4 | 0 |
| 40 | Australia | 1 | 2 | 0 | 0 | 0 | 2 | 2 | 8 | –6 | 0 |
| 41 | Malaysia | 1 | 2 | 0 | 0 | 0 | 2 | 4 | 13 | –9 | 0 |
| 42 | Belgium | 1 | 2 | 0 | 0 | 0 | 2 | 5 | 18 | –13 | 0 |
| 43 | Madagascar | 1 | 3 | 0 | 0 | 0 | 3 | 7 | 12 | –5 | 0 |
| 44 | Panama | 1 | 3 | 0 | 0 | 0 | 3 | 4 | 14 | –10 | 0 |
| 45 | Ecuador | 1 | 3 | 0 | 0 | 0 | 3 | 6 | 22 | –16 | 0 |
| 46 | South Africa | 2 | 4 | 0 | 0 | 0 | 4 | 6 | 29 | –23 | 0 |
| 47 | Costa Rica | 2 | 6 | 0 | 0 | 0 | 6 | 8 | 31 | –23 | 0 |

== Medal table ==
| Rank | Nation | Gold | Silver | Bronze | Total |
|---|---|---|---|---|---|
| 1 | Brazil | 15 | 1 | 2 | 18 |
| 2 | Portugal | 3 | 3 | 5 | 11 |
| 3 | Russia | 3 | 0 | 2 | 5 |
| 4 | France | 1 | 2 | 1 | 4 |
| 5 | Uruguay | 0 | 3 | 4 | 7 |
| 6 | Italy | 0 | 3 | 1 | 4 |
| 6 | Spain | 0 | 3 | 1 | 4 |
| 8 | Tahiti | 0 | 2 | 0 | 2 |
| 9 | Switzerland | 0 | 1 | 1 | 2 |
| 9 | United States | 0 | 1 | 1 | 2 |
| 11 | Japan | 0 | 1 | 0 | 1 |
| 11 | Mexico | 0 | 1 | 0 | 1 |
| 11 | Peru | 0 | 1 | 0 | 1 |
| 14 | Iran | 0 | 0 | 2 | 2 |
| 15 | Argentina | 0 | 0 | 1 | 1 |
| 15 | England | 0 | 0 | 1 | 1 |
| Totals (16 entries) | | 22 | 22 | 22 | 66 |

== Comprehensive team results by tournament ==
=== Legend ===
- 1st — Champions
- 2nd — Runners-up
- 3rd — Third place
- 4th — Fourth place
- QF — Quarter-finals (1999–2001, 2004–present)
- R1 — Round 1 (group stage)
- q — Qualified for upcoming tournament
- •• — Qualified but withdrew (2005–)
- • — Did not participate (1995–2004), Did not qualify (2005–)
- × — Did not enter (2005–)
- — Hosts

For each tournament, the number of teams in each finals tournament (in brackets) are shown.

| Year Team | Beach Soccer World Championships | | | | | | | | | | FIFA Beach Soccer World Cup | | | | | | | | | | | | | Appearances | | |
| Year Team | 1995 (Brazil) (8) | 1996 (Brazil) (8) | 1997 (Brazil) (8) | 1998 (Brazil) (10) | 1999 (Brazil) (12) | 2000 (Brazil) (12) | 2001 (Brazil) (12) | 2002 (Brazil) (8) | 2003 (Brazil) (8) | 2004 (Brazil) (12) | 2005 (Brazil) (12) | 2006 (Brazil) (16) | 2007 (Brazil) (16) | 2008 (France) (16) | 2009 (United Arab Emirates) (16) | 2011 (Italy) (16) | 2013 (French Polynesia) (16) | 2015 (Portugal) (16) | 2017 (The Bahamas) (16) | 2019 (Paraguay) (16) | 2021 (Russia) (16) | 2024 (United Arab Emirates) (16) | 2025 (Seychelles) (16) | WC /10 | FIFA /13 | Total /23 |
|---|---|---|---|---|---|---|---|---|---|---|---|---|---|---|---|---|---|---|---|---|---|---|---|---|---|---|
| Argentina | R1; 7th | R1; 8th | 4th | R1; 8th | • | R1; 10th | 3rd | R1; 8th | • | QF; 7th | QF; 8th | QF; 5th | R1; 11th | QF; 5th | R1; 9th | R1; 11th | QF; 8th | R1; 12th | • | • | • | R1; 11th | • | 8 | 9 | 17 |
| Australia | • | • | • | • | • | • | • | • | • | • | R1; 9th | × | × | × | • | × | • | × | × | × | × | × | × | 0 | 1 | 1 |
| Bahamas | • | • | • | • | • | • | • | • | • | • | × | × | × | × | • | • | • | • | R1; 11th | • | • | • | • | 0 | 1 | 1 |
| Bahrain | • | • | • | • | • | • | • | • | • | • | × | QF; 6th | • | × | R1; 16th | • | • | • | • | • | × | • | • | 0 | 2 | 2 |
| Belarus | • | • | • | • | • | • | • | • | • | • | × | × | × | • | • | • | • | • | • | R1; 11th | R1; 14th | 4th | 2nd | 0 | 4 | 4 |
| Belgium | • | • | • | • | • | • | • | • | • | R1; 12th | • | • | × | × | • | × | × | × | × | × | × | × | • | 1 | 0 | 1 |
| Brazil | 1st | 1st | 1st | 1st | 1st | 1st | 4th | 1st | 1st | 1st | 3rd | 1st | 1st | 1st | 1st | 2nd | 3rd | QF; 5th | 1st | QF; 5th | QF; 5th | 1st | 1st | 10 | 13 | 23 |
| Cameroon | • | • | • | • | • | • | • | • | • | • | × | R1; 14th | • | R1; 16th | × | × | × | • | × | • | × | • | × | 0 | 2 | 2 |
| Canada | • | R1; 7th | • | • | QF; 7th | • | • | • | • | • | • | QF; 7th | × | × | • | • | • | × | • | × | × | × | • | 2 | 1 | 3 |
| Chile | • | • | • | R1; 9th | • | • | • | • | • | • | × | × | × | • | • | • | • | • | • | • | • | • | R1; 10th | 1 | 1 | 2 |
| Colombia | • | • | • | • | • | • | • | • | • | • | × | × | × | × | × | • | • | • | • | • | • | R1; 15th | • | 0 | 1 | 1 |
| Costa Rica | • | • | • | • | • | • | • | • | • | • | × | • | • | • | R1; 15th | • | • | R1; 16th | • | • | • | • | • | 0 | 2 | 2 |
| Denmark | • | R1; 6th | • | • | • | • | • | • | • | • | × | × | × | × | × | × | × | × | • | × | • | • | • | 1 | 0 | 1 |
| Ecuador | • | • | • | • | • | • | • | • | • | • | × | × | × | × | • | • | • | • | R1; 16th | • | • | • | • | 0 | 1 | 1 |
| Egypt | • | • | • | • | • | • | • | • | • | • | × | • | • | • | • | • | • | • | • | • | • | R1; 12th | • | 0 | 1 | 1 |
| El Salvador | • | • | • | • | • | • | • | • | • | • | × | × | • | R1; 14th | R1; 14th | 4th | QF; 6th | • | • | • | R1; 15th | • | R1; 13th | 0 | 6 | 6 |
| England | 3rd | • | • | • | • | • | • | • | • | • | • | • | • | • | • | • | • | • | • | × | • | × | • | 1 | 0 | 1 |
| France | • | • | R1; 7th | 2nd | R1; 11th | R1; 11th | 2nd | R1; 7th | 4th | QF; 5th | 1st | 3rd | 4th | QF; 8th | • | • | • | • | • | • | • | • | • | 8 | 4 | 12 |
| Germany | R1; 5th | • | • | • | • | R1; 12th | R1; 12th | • | • | R1; 11th | • | • | • | • | • | • | • | • | • | • | • | • | • | 4 | 0 | 4 |
| Guatemala | • | • | • | • | • | • | • | • | • | • | • | • | • | • | • | • | • | • | × | • | • | • | R1; 11th | 0 | 1 | 1 |
| Iran | • | • | • | • | • | • | • | • | • | • | × | R1; 16th | R1; 12th | R1; 13th | • | R1; 13th | QF; 5th | QF; 6th | 3rd | • | × | 3rd | QF; 7th | 0 | 9 | 9 |
| Italy | 4th | 3rd | R1; 5th | R1; 10th | R1; 9th | QF; 8th | QF; 8th | R1; 6th | R1; 6th | 4th | • | R1; 15th | R1; 10th | 2nd | QF; 8th | QF; 5th | • | 4th | 4th | 2nd | • | 2nd | QF; 6th | 10 | 10 | 20 |
| Ivory Coast | • | • | • | • | • | • | • | • | • | • | × | • | • | • | R1; 11th | • | R1; 16th | • | • | • | • | • | • | 0 | 2 | 2 |
| Japan | • | • | R1; 8th | • | QF; 8th | 4th | • | • | R1; 7th | • | 4th | QF; 8th | R1; 15th | R1; 16th | QF; 5th | R1; 14th | QF; 7th | QF; 7th | R1; 10th | 4th | 2nd | QF; 8th | QF; 5th | 4 | 13 | 17 |
| Madagascar | • | • | • | • | • | • | • | • | • | • | × | × | × | × | × | • | • | R1; 14th | • | • | • | • | × | 0 | 1 | 1 |
| Malaysia | • | • | • | • | R1; 10th | • | • | • | • | • | × | × | × | × | × | × | × | × | • | • | × | • | • | 1 | 0 | 1 |
| Mauritania | • | • | • | • | • | • | • | • | • | • | × | × | × | × | × | × | × | × | × | × | × | × | R1; 14th | 0 | 1 | 1 |
| Mexico | • | • | • | • | • | • | • | • | • | • | • | • | 2nd | R1; 11th | • | QF; 8th | • | R1; 15th | R1; 13th | R1; 15th | • | R1; 16th | • | 0 | 7 | 7 |
| Mozambique | • | • | • | • | • | • | • | • | • | • | × | × | • | • | • | × | × | • | • | • | R1; 11th | • | • | 0 | 1 | 1 |
| Netherlands | R1; 8th | • | • | • | • | • | • | • | • | • | • | • | × | • | • | • | R1; 14th | × | • | × | × | × | × | 1 | 1 | 2 |
| Nigeria | • | • | • | • | • | • | • | • | • | • | × | R1; 9th | QF; 6th | • | R1; 12th | QF; 6th | • | • | R1; 12th | R1; 16th | × | • | • | 0 | 6 | 6 |
| Oman | • | • | • | • | • | • | • | • | • | • | × | × | × | × | • | R1; 15th | • | R1; 9th | • | R1; 13th | R1; 12th | R1; 9th | R1; 12th | 0 | 6 | 6 |
| Panama | • | • | • | • | • | • | • | • | • | • | × | × | × | × | × | × | × | • | R1; 14th | • | • | • | • | 0 | 1 | 1 |
| Paraguay | • | • | • | • | • | • | • | • | • | • | × | • | × | • | • | • | R1; 9th | R1; 11th | QF; 7th | R1; 10th | R1; 9th | • | R1; 9th | 0 | 6 | 6 |
| Peru | • | • | • | 4th | 4th | 2nd | QF; 7th | • | • | R1; 9th | • | • | × | • | • | • | • | • | • | • | • | • | • | 5 | 0 | 5 |
| Poland | • | • | • | • | • | • | • | • | • | • | • | R1; 11th | • | • | • | • | • | • | R1; 15th | • | • | • | • | 0 | 2 | 2 |
| Portugal | • | • | R1; 6th | R1; 5th | 2nd | QF; 6th | 1st | 2nd | 3rd | 3rd | 2nd | 4th | QF; 8th | 3rd | 3rd | 3rd | • | 1st | QF; 8th | 1st | R1; 10th | QF; 5th | 3rd | 8 | 12 | 20 |
| Russia | • | R1; 5th | • | • | • | • | • | • | • | • | × | • | R1; 9th | QF; 6th | QF; 7th | 1st | 1st | 3rd | • | 3rd | 1st | × | × | 1 | 8 | 9 |
| Senegal | • | • | • | • | • | • | • | • | • | • | × | × | QF; 5th | R1; 9th | • | QF; 7th | R1; 13th | R1; 13th | QF; 6th | QF; 6th | 4th | R1; 10th | 4th | 0 | 10 | 10 |
| Seychelles | • | • | • | • | • | • | • | • | • | • | × | × | × | × | × | × | × | • | × | × | • | • | R1; 16th | 0 | 1 | 1 |
| Solomon Islands | • | • | • | • | • | • | • | • | • | • | × | R1; 12th | R1; 16th | R1; 12th | R1; 13th | • | R1; 11th | × | × | • | × | • | • | 0 | 5 | 5 |
| South Africa | • | • | • | • | R1; 12th | • | • | • | • | • | R1; 12th | • | • | • | • | • | × | • | × | • | × | × | × | 1 | 1 | 2 |
| Spain | • | • | • | R1; 6th | QF; 5th | 3rd | QF; 6th | R1; 6th | 2nd | 2nd | QF; 7th | R1; 10th | QF; 7th | 4th | QF; 6th | • | 2nd | R1; 10th | • | • | QF; 7th | R1; 13th | QF; 8th | 7 | 10 | 17 |
| Switzerland | • | • | • | • | • | • | • | • | • | QF; 8th | • | • | • | • | 2nd | R1; 10th | • | QF; 8th | QF; 5th | QF; 8th | 3rd | • | • | 1 | 6 | 7 |
| Tahiti | • | • | • | • | • | • | • | • | • | • | × | • | • | × | • | R1; 12th | 4th | 2nd | 2nd | R1; 9th | QF; 6th | QF; 7th | R1; 15th | 0 | 8 | 8 |
| Thailand | • | • | • | • | • | • | • | 4th | • | • | R1; 11th | × | × | × | × | × | × | • | • | • | × | • | • | 1 | 1 | 2 |
| Turkey | • | • | • | • | • | • | R1; 10th | • | • | • | • | × | • | × | • | • | • | • | • | • | • | • | × | 1 | 0 | 1 |
| Ukraine | • | • | • | • | • | • | • | • | • | • | QF; 6th | • | • | • | • | R1; 9th | R1; 12th | • | • | × | •• | •• | • | 0 | 3 | 3 |
| United Arab Emirates | • | • | • | • | • | • | • | • | • | • | × | • | R1; 14th | R1; 10th | R1; 10th | • | R1; 15th | • | R1; 9th | R1; 12th | R1; 13th | QF; 6th | • | 0 | 8 | 8 |
| United States | 2nd | 4th | 3rd | R1; 7th | QF; 6th | QF; 7th | QF; 5th | • | R1; 8th | R1; 10th | R1; 10th | R1; 13th | R1; 13th | • | • | • | R1; 10th | • | • | R1; 14th | R1; 16th | R1; 14th | • | 9 | 7 | 16 |
| Uruguay | R1; 6th | 2nd | 2nd | 3rd | 3rd | R1; 9th | R1; 11th | 3rd | R1; 5th | QF; 6th | QF; 5th | 2nd | 3rd | QF; 7th | 4th | • | • | • | • | QF; 7th | QF; 8th | • | • | 10 | 7 | 17 |
| Venezuela | • | • | • | • | • | QF; 5th | R1; 9th | • | • | • | • | • | • | • | • | R1; 16th | • | • | • | • | • | • | • | 2 | 1 | 3 |
| Year Team | Beach Soccer World Championships | | | | | | | | | | FIFA Beach Soccer World Cup | | | | | | | | | | | | | Appearances | | |
| Year Team | 1995 (Brazil) (8) | 1996 (Brazil) (8) | 1997 (Brazil) (8) | 1998 (Brazil) (10) | 1999 (Brazil) (12) | 2000 (Brazil) (12) | 2001 (Brazil) (12) | 2002 (Brazil) (8) | 2003 (Brazil) (8) | 2004 (Brazil) (12) | 2005 (Brazil) (12) | 2006 (Brazil) (16) | 2007 (Brazil) (16) | 2008 (France) (16) | 2009 (United Arab Emirates) (16) | 2011 (Italy) (16) | 2013 (French Polynesia) (16) | 2015 (Portugal) (16) | 2017 (The Bahamas) (16) | 2019 (Paraguay) (16) | 2021 (Russia) (16) | 2024 (United Arab Emirates) (16) | 2025 (Seychelles) (16) | WC /10 | FIFA /13 | Total /23 |

== Awards ==
The following documents the winners of the awards presented at the conclusion of the tournament. Eight awards are currently presented.

=== Golden Ball ===
The adidas Golden Ball award is awarded to the player who plays the most outstanding football during the tournament. It is selected by the media poll.

| World Cup | Golden Ball | Silver Ball | Bronze Ball | Ref(s) |
|---|---|---|---|---|
| 2005 Brazil | (Portugal) Madjer | (Brazil) Neném | (Spain) Amarelle | |
| 2006 Brazil | (Portugal) Madjer | (Brazil) Benjamin | (Brazil) Bruno | |
| 2007 Brazil | (Brazil) Buru | (Portugal) Madjer | (Mexico) Morgan Plata | |
| 2008 France | (Spain) Amarelle | (Brazil) Benjamin | (Portugal) Belchior | |
| 2009 United Arab Emirates | (Switzerland) Dejan Stankovic | (Portugal) Madjer | (Brazil) Benjamin | |
| 2011 Italy | (Russia) Ilya Leonov | (Brazil) André | (El Salvador) Frank Velásquez | |
| 2013 Tahiti | (Brazil) Bruno Xavier | (Japan) Ozu Moreira | (French Polynesia) Raimana Li Fung Kuee | |
| 2015 Portugal | (French Polynesia) Heimanu Taiarui | (Portugal) Alan | (Portugal) Madjer | |
| 2017 Bahamas | (Iran) Mohammad Ahmadzadeh | (Brazil) Mauricinho | (Brazil) Datinha | |
| 2019 Paraguay | (Japan) Ozu Moreira | (Portugal) Jordan Santos | (Portugal) Bê Martins | |
| 2021 Russia | (Switzerland) Noël Ott | (Russia) Artur Paporotnyi | (Senegal) Raoul Mendy | |
| 2024 United Arab Emirates | (Italy) Josep Jr. Gentilin | (Brazil) Mauricinho | (Belarus) Ihar Bryshtel | |
| 2025 Seychelles | (Brazil) Rodrigo | (Belarus) Ihar Bryshtel | (Portugal) Bê Martins | |

=== Golden Shoe ===
The adidas Golden Shoe is awarded to the top scorer of the tournament. If more than one player are equal by the same goals, the players will be selected based on the most assists during the tournament.

| World Cup | Golden Shoe | Goals | Silver Shoe | Goals | Bronze Shoe | Goals | Ref(s) |
|---|---|---|---|---|---|---|---|
| 2005 Brazil | (Portugal) Madjer | 12 | (Brazil) Neném | 9 | (France) Anthony Mendy | 8 | |
| 2006 Brazil | (Portugal) Madjer | 21 | (Brazil) Benjamin | 12 | (Brazil) Bruno | 10 | |
| 2007 Brazil | (Brazil) Buru | 10 | (Mexico) Morgan Plata | 9 | (Brazil) Bruno | 8 | |
| 2008 France | (Portugal) Madjer | 13 | (Spain) Amarelle | 11 | (Portugal) Belchior | 10 | |
| 2009 United Arab Emirates | (Switzerland) Dejan Stankovic | 16 | (Portugal) Madjer | 11 | (Brazil) Buru | 10 | |
| 2011 Italy | (Brazil) André | 14 | (Portugal) Madjer | 12 | (El Salvador) Frank Velásquez | 9 | |
| 2013 Tahiti | (Russia) Dmitry Shishin | 11 | (Brazil) Bruno Xavier | 10 | (El Salvador) Agustín Ruiz | 7 | |
| 2015 Portugal | (Paraguay) Pedro Morán | 8 | (Portugal) Madjer | 8 | (Switzerland) Noël Ott | 8 | |
| 2017 Bahamas | (Italy) Gabriele Gori | 17 | (Brazil) Rodrigo | 9 | (Iran) Mohammad Ahmadzadeh | 9 | |
| 2019 Paraguay | (Italy) Gabriele Gori | 16 | (Italy) Emmanuele Zurlo | 10 | (Russia) Fedor Zemskov | 10 | |
| 2021 Russia | (Switzerland) Glenn Hodel | 12 | (Switzerland) Dejan Stankovic | 10 | (Japan) Takuya Akaguma | 10 | |
| 2024 United Arab Emirates | (Belarus) Ihar Bryshtel | 12 | (Brazil) Léo Martins | 7 | (Iran) Mohammadali Mokhtari | 7 | |
| 2025 Seychelles | (Belarus) Ihar Bryshtel | 11 | (Portugal) André Lourenço | 8 | (Brazil) Rodrigo | 7 | |

=== Golden Glove ===
The Golden Glove Award is awarded to the best goalkeeper of the tournament.

| World Cup | Golden Glove | Ref(s) |
|---|---|---|
| 2008 France | (Spain) Roberto Valeiro | |
| 2009 United Arab Emirates | (Brazil) Mão | |
| 2011 Italy | (Russia) Andrey Bukhlitskiy | |
| 2013 Tahiti | (Spain) Dona | |
| 2015 Portugal | (French Polynesia) Jonathan Torohia | |
| 2017 Bahamas | (Iran) Peyman Hosseini | |
| 2019 Paraguay | (Portugal) Elinton Andrade | |
| 2021 Russia | (Switzerland) Eliott Mounoud | |
| 2024 United Arab Emirate | (Brazil) Tiago Bobô | |
| 2025 Seychelles | (Belarus) Mikhail Avgustov | |

=== FIFA Fair Play Award ===
The FIFA Fair Play Award is given to the team who has the best fair play record during the tournament with the criteria set by FIFA Fair Play Committee.

| Tournament | FIFA Fair Play Award | Ref(s) |
|---|---|---|
| 2005 Brazil | Japan | |
| 2006 Brazil | France | |
| 2007 Brazil | Brazil | |
| 2008 France | Russia | |
| 2009 United Arab Emirates | Japan; Russia | |
| 2011 Italy | Nigeria | |
| 2013 Tahiti | Russia | |
| 2015 Portugal | Brazil | |
| 2017 Bahamas | Brazil | |
| 2019 Paraguay | Senegal | |
| 2021 Russia | Brazil | |
| 2024 United Arab Emirates | Portugal | |
| 2025 Seychelles | Japan | |

== Top goalscorers ==
From the data available the table below lists the all-time top 30 goalscorers, totalling goals scored by players across both world cup iterations.^{[Note]}

| Rank | Player | Team | Goals | | |
| Rank | Player | Team | WC era | FIFA era | Total |
|---|---|---|---|---|---|
| 1 | Madjer | Portugal | 52 | 88 | 140 |
| 2 | Alan | Portugal | 37 | 38 | 75 |
| 3 | Júnior Negão | Brazil | 54 | 18 | 72 |
| 4 | Júnior | Brazil | 71 | 0 | 71 |
| 5 | Benjamin | Brazil | 30 | 35 | 65 |
| 6 | Neném | Brazil | 55 | 9 | 64 |
| 7 | Amarelle | Spain | 32 | 27 | 59 |
| 8 | Jorginho | Brazil | 43 | 6 | 49 |
| 9 | Dejan Stanković | Switzerland | 0 | 47 | 47 |
| 10 | Belchior | Portugal | 6 | 39 | 45 |
| 11 | Buru | Brazil | 8 | 35 | 43 |
| 12 | Bruno | Brazil | 2 | 39 | 41 |
| 12 | Gabriele Gori | Italy | 0 | 41 | 41 |
| 14 | André | Brazil | 1 | 38 | 39 |
| 15 | Venancio Ramos | Uruguay | 34 | 0 | 34 |
| 16 | Dmitry Shishin | Russia | 0 | 33 | 33 |
| 17 | Alessandro Altobelli | Italy | 30 | 0 | 30 |
| 17 | Nico | Spain | 12 | 18 | 30 |
| 19 | Juninho | Brazil | 25 | 4 | 29 |
| 20 | Cláudio Adão | Brazil | 28 | 0 | 28 |
| 20 | Paolo Palmacci | Italy | 0 | 28 | 28 |
| 20 | Ricardo Martinez | Uruguay | 1 | 27 | 28 |
| 23 | Hernâni | Portugal | 22 | 5 | 27 |
| 24 | Mohammad Ahmadzadeh | Iran | 0 | 26 | 26 |
| 25 | Didier Samoun | France | 7 | 18 | 25 |
| 25 | Edinho | Brazil | 25 | 0 | 25 |
| 25 | Noël Ott | Switzerland | 0 | 25 | 25 |
| 25 | Pedro Morán | Paraguay | 0 | 25 | 25 |
| 29 | Pape Jean Koukpaki | Senegal | 0 | 23 | 23 |
| 29 | Rodrigo | Brazil | 0 | 23 | 23 |
| 29 | Zico | Brazil | 23 | 0 | 23 |

1995–2001 (combined list), 2003, 2004, 2005, 2006, 2007, 2008, 2009, 2011, 2013, 2015, 2017, 2019, 2021

Notes:
- Note that the source for 1995–2002 is a list of the players with the most goals from all those tournaments combined; players must have scored at least 10 goals overall to make the list; players with less goals are not listed. This means for players who subsequently scored enough goals to make the above all-time table, if they played between 1995–2002 and scored less than 10 goals, they would not have made the source lists and therefore any goals they did score during that time are a) unknown and b) missing from the above table (if they did score any).
- Note that there are some discrepancies between FIFA's individual match reports and FIFA's top scorers lists for the same tournament; the data for this table is taken from the latter.
- During the early years of beach soccer, goals scored in a penalty shootout were often combined with goals scored during regulation time when the match score was reported – note that it is also possible such goals may have been counted in a player's goal tally in the sources.

== See also ==
- FIFA World Cup records and statistics
- FIFA Futsal World Cup

== Notes ==
1. At the 2021 edition, in accordance with a ban by the World Anti-Doping Agency (WADA) and a decision by the Court of Arbitration for Sport (CAS), the team from Russia was not permitted to use the Russian name, flag, or anthem; it participated in the World Cup as "the team of the Russian Football Union (RFU)", and used the flag of the Russian Olympic Committee. For the purpose of continuity in this article, the results of the RFU team in 2021 are considered as de facto results of the Russian national team.
