= Ishaq Al-Qassmi =

Omani footballer (born 1985)

Personal information
- Full name: Ishaq Al-Mas Al-Qassmi
- Date of birth: 10 September 1985 (age 41)
- Place of birth: Quriyat, Oman
- Height: 1.73 m (5 ft 8 in)
- Position: Striker

Team information
- Current team: Ahli Sidab

Youth career
- 2000–2003: Ahli Sidab
- 2003–2004: Muscat

Senior career*
Years	Team	Apps	(Gls)
2004–2007	Ahli Sidab		
2008	Al-Shabab		
2009–	Ahli Sidab		

International career
2000	Oman U16		
2008–	Oman (beach)		
- * Club domestic league appearances and goals

Ishaq Al-Mas Al-Qassmi (Arabic: إسحاق الماس القاسمي; born 10 September 1985) is an Omani footballer and beach soccer player who plays for Omani club Ahli Sidab Club.

== International career ==
Ishaq is part of the first team squad of the Oman national beach soccer team. He was selected for the national team for the first time in 2011.

=== Asian Beach Games ===
He has made appearances in the 2008 Asian Beach Games and the 2010 Asian Beach Games.

In the 2010 edition, which was played in Muscat, Oman, he scored a goal in a 7-2 win over Syria and a brace in a 9-4 win over Indonesia thus helping his side to qualify for the Quarter-finals. In the Quarter-finals stage, he scored a hat-trick in a 6-1 win over Bahrain thus taking his goals tally to 6 goals. Oman finished as the runners-up of the tournament as they lost on penalty shootout to the United Arab Emirates after the match had ended 2-2 after extra time.

=== AFC Beach Soccer Championship ===
He has made appearances in the 2009 AFC Beach Soccer Championship, the 2011 AFC Beach Soccer Championship and the 2013 AFC Beach Soccer Championship.

In the 2011 edition, which was played in Muscat, Oman, he scored a goal in an 8-6 victory over Kuwait, 4 goals in an 11-3 win over Iraq, a goal in a 5-2 win over Syria in the Semi-finals and another in the finals of the competition in a 1-2 loss against Japan thus taking his goals tally to 8 goals and also sharing the top scorer award with Japan's Takeshi Kawaharazuka. Oman secured the runners-up place in the tournament in the tournament as they lost 1-2 against Asian heavy weights and defending champions Japan.

In the 2013 edition, which was held in Doha, Qatar, he scored 3 goals, one in a 4-6 loss against Australia, another in a 7-0 win over Afghanistan and another in a 3-1 win over Qatar.

=== FIFA Beach Soccer World Cup ===
He made 3 appearances and scored 1 goal in the 2011 FIFA Beach Soccer World Cup.

He scored his first FIFA Beach Soccer World Cup goal on 5 September 2011 in an 8-3 loss against Portugal in the final match of Group B in the tournament at the Stadio del Mare, Ravenna, Italy.

He made 3 appearances and scored 2 goals in the 2015 FIFA Beach Soccer World Cup.

He scored a brace in the eighth edition of the FIFA Beach Soccer World Cup on 13 July 2015 in a 7-2 win over Costa Rica which was also Oman's first ever FIFA Beach Soccer World Cup win.
