= Iran at the 2010 Asian Beach Games =

- IOC code: IRI
- NOC: National Olympic Committee of the Islamic Republic of Iran

in Muscat
- Competitors: 18 in 3 sports
- Flag bearer: Mostafa Nodehi
- Medals Ranked 21st: Gold 0 Silver 0 Bronze 2 Total 2

Asian Beach Games appearances
- 2008; 2010; 2012; 2014; 2016; 2026

Iran participated in the 2010 Asian Beach Games in Muscat, Oman on 8–16 December 2010.

== Competitors ==
Sport	Men	Women	Total
Beach kabaddi	6		6
Beach soccer	10		10
Triathlon	2		2
Total	18	0	18

== Medal summary ==
=== Medals by sport ===
Sport	Gold	Silver	Bronze	Total
Beach kabaddi			1	1
Beach soccer			1	1
Total	0	0	2	2

=== Medalists ===
Medal	Name	Sport	Event
Bronze	Ramezan Ali Paeinmahalli; Meraj Sheikh; Farhad Kamal Gharibi; Keivan Arshad; Hadi Oshtorak; Mostafa Nodehi	Beach kabaddi	Men
Bronze	Mehdi Bahrololoum; Farough Dara; Hassan Abdollahi; Ali Naderi; Hamid Reza Zareei; Mehran Morshedizadeh; Farid Boloukbashi; Moslem Mesigar; Mohammad Ahmadzadeh; Mohammad Reza Hajipour	Beach soccer	Men

== Results by event ==
=== Beach kabaddi ===
Team	Event	Preliminary round					Semifinal	Final	Rank
Team	Event	Round 1	Round 2	Round 3	Round 4	Rank	Semifinal	Final	Rank
Iran	Men	Sri Lanka; W 60–26	Pakistan; L 30–50	Afghanistan; W 60–26	Indonesia; W 51–29	2 Q	India; L 36–37	Did not advance	3rd place, bronze medalist(s)
Roster: Ramezan Ali Paeinmahalli; Meraj Sheikh; Farhad Kamal Gharibi; Keivan Arshad; Hadi Oshtorak; Mostafa Nodehi; Coach: Behzad Bamedi

=== Beach soccer ===
Team	Event	Preliminary round				Quarterfinal	Semifinal	Final	Rank
Team	Event	Round 1	Round 2	Round 3	Rank	Quarterfinal	Semifinal	Final	Rank
Iran	Men	Lebanon; W 9–4	Thailand; W 14–2	Japan; W 2–1	1 Q	Yemen; W 8–3	Oman; L 1–4	3rd place match China; W 6–1	3rd place, bronze medalist(s)
Roster: Mehdi Bahrololoum; Farough Dara; Hassan Abdollahi; Ali Naderi; Hamid Reza Zareei; Mehran Morshedizadeh; Farid Boloukbashi; Moslem Mesigar; Mohammad Ahmadzadeh; Mohammad Reza Hajipour; Coach: (Brazil) Marco Octávio

=== Triathlon ===
Athlete	Event	Time	Rank
Ehsan Aminian	Men's individual	1:59:51.64	11
Maghsoud Shobeiri	Men's individual	Did not finish	—
