= 2011 FIFA Beach Soccer World Cup goal scorers =

The 2011 FIFA Beach Soccer World Cup is an international beach soccer tournament being held in Ravenna, Italy from 1 September until 11 September 2011. This page lists all of the players that have scored at least one goal during the tournament.

Goals scored during the penalty kick session after an extra time period do not count toward a player's individual goal total.

== 14 goals ==
- (Brazil) André

== 12 goals ==
- (Portugal) Madjer

== 9 goals ==
- (El Salvador) Francisco Velasquez

== 8 goals ==
- (Russia) Egor Shaykov

== 7 goals ==
- (Italy) Paolo Palmacci
- (Russia) Egor Eremeev
- (Russia) Ilya Leonov
- (Russia) Dmitry Shishin

== 6 goals ==
- (Nigeria) Victor Tale
- (Portugal) Nuno Belchior
- (Senegal) Pape Koukpaki

== 5 goals ==
- (Brazil) Sidney
- (Russia) Aleksey Makarov
- (Senegal) Ndiaga Mbaye
- (El Salvador) Agustin Ruiz

== 4 goals ==
- (Brazil) Benjamin
- (Nigeria) Bartholomew Ibenegbu
- (Russia) Yuri Krasheninnikov
- (Senegal) Ngalla Sylla
- (Switzerland) Dejan Stankovic

== 3 goals ==
- (Brazil) Betinho
- (Iran) Hassan Abdollahi
- (Iran) Farid Boulokbashi
- (Italy) Giuseppe Soria
- (Mexico) Morgan Plata
- (Nigeria) Musa Najare
- (Nigeria) Isiaka Olawale
- (Oman) Jalal Al-Sinani
- (Portugal) Alan
- (Portugal) Lucio
- (Russia) Yuri Gorchinskiy
- (Switzerland) Mo Jaeggy
- (Switzerland) Stephan Leu
- (French Polynesia) Teva Zaveroni

== 2 goals ==
- (Argentina) Jonathan Levi
- (Brazil) Bruno Malias
- (Brazil) Buru
- (Brazil) Jorginho
- (Iran) Mehdi Hassani
- (Iran) Mohammad Mokhtari
- (Italy) Francesco Corosiniti
- (Italy) Franco Palma
- (Japan) Masayuki Komaki
- (Japan) Shusei Yamauchi
- (Mexico) Ricardo Villalobos
- (Nigeria) Ogbonnaya Okemmiri
- (Nigeria) James Okwuosa
- (Portugal) Rui Coimbra
- (Russia) Anton Shkarin
- (Senegal) Ibrahima Bakhoum
- (Senegal) Libasse Diagne
- (Senegal) Babacar Fall
- (El Salvador) Tomás Hernandez
- (Ukraine) Oleg Zborovskyi
- (Venezuela) Edgar Quintero

== 1 goal ==
- (Argentina) Luciano Franceschini
- (Argentina) Sebastian Larreta
- (Argentina) German Spinelli
- (Argentina) Javier Vivas
- (Brazil) Anderson
- (Iran) Mohammad Ahmadzadeh
- (Iran) Moslem Mesigar
- (Iran) Ali Naderi
- (Italy) Simone Feudi
- (Italy) Gabriele Gori
- (Italy) Matteo Marrucci
- (Italy) Franco Palma
- (Japan) Hirofumi Oda
- (Japan) Shunta Suzuki
- (Mexico) Antonio Barbosa
- (Mexico) Francisco Cati
- (Mexico) Jose Cervantes
- (Mexico) Angel Rodriguez
- (Nigeria) Nelson Nwosu
- (Oman) Hani Al-Dhabit
- (Oman) Nasser Al-Mukhaini
- (Oman) Ishaq Al-Mas
- (Oman) Khalid Al-Rajhi
- (Portugal) Duarte
- (Portugal) Paulo Graça
- (Portugal) Bruno Novo
- (Portugal) Jordan Santos
- (Portugal) Bruno Torres
- (El Salvador) Wilber Alvarado
- (El Salvador) Jose Membreño
- (El Salvador) Elias Ramirez
- (Senegal) Cheikh Ba
- (Switzerland) Valentin Jaeggy
- (Switzerland) Michael Rodrigues
- (Switzerland) Angelo Schirinzi
- (Switzerland) Sandro Spaccarotella
- (French Polynesia) Marama Amau
- (French Polynesia) Naea Bennett
- (French Polynesia) Tearii Labaste
- (Ukraine) Igor Borsuk
- (Ukraine) Sergiy Bozhenko
- (Ukraine) Anton Butko
- (Ukraine) Oleksandr Korniychuk
- (Ukraine) Oleg Mozgovyy
- (Ukraine) Roman Pachev
- (Ukraine) Oleg Zborovskyi
- (Venezuela) Kevin Camargo
- (Venezuela) Gian Luca Cardone
- (Venezuela) Francisco Landaeta
- (Venezuela) Carlos Longa
- (Venezuela) Marcos Monsalve

== Own goal ==
2 own goals

- (Senegal) Ngalla Sylla (playing against Switzerland)

1 own goal

- (Brazil) Betinho (playing against Russia)
- (Nigeria) Nelson Nwosu (playing against Venezuela)
- (Oman) Yahya Al Araimi (playing against Portugal)
- (Oman) Nasser Al Mukhaini (playing against El Salvador)
