= Iran at the 2008 Asian Beach Games =

- IOC code: IRI
- NOC: National Olympic Committee of the Islamic Republic of Iran

in Bali
- Competitors: 10 in 1 sport
- Medals: Gold 0 Silver 0 Bronze 0 Total 0

Asian Beach Games appearances
- 2008; 2010; 2012; 2014; 2016; 2026

Iran participated in the 2008 Asian Beach Games held in Bali, Indonesia from October 18, 2008 to October 26, 2008 and failed to win a medal.

At first Iran was supposed to send a big delegation to this event but finally only a beach soccer team represented Iran in Bali.

== Competitors ==
Sport	Men	Women	Total
Beach soccer	10		10
Total	10	0	10

== Results by event ==
=== Beach soccer ===
Team	Event	Preliminary round				Quarterfinal	Semifinal	Final	Rank
Team	Event	Round 1	Round 2	Round 3	Rank	Quarterfinal	Semifinal	Final	Rank
Iran	Men	Malaysia; W 6–1	India; W 7–4	China; W 6–3	1 Q	Bahrain; L 1–3	Did not advance		5
Roster: Hamed Ghorbanpour; Hassan Abdollahi; Farough Dara; Ali Naderi; Masoud Gholami; Mahmoud Ayoubi; Farid Boloukbashi; Moslem Mesigar; Mohammad Ahmadzadeh; Mehdi Bahrololoum; Coach: Farshad Falahatzadeh
