= 2015 FIFA Beach Soccer World Cup =

Campeonato do Mundo de Futebol de Praia da FIFA Portugal 2015

Tournament details
- Host country: Portugal
- City: Espinho
- Dates: 9–19 July
- Teams: 16 (from 6 confederations)
- Venue: 1 (in 1 host city)

Final positions
- Champions: Portugal (1st title)
- Runners-up: Tahiti
- Third place: Russia
- Fourth place: Italy

Tournament statistics
- Matches played: 32
- Goals scored: 253 (7.91 per match)
- Attendance: 96,300 (3,009 per match)
- Top scorer(s): (Paraguay) Pedro Moran (Portugal) Madjer (Switzerland) Noel Ott (8 goals)
- Best player: (French Polynesia) Heimanu Taiarui
- Best goalkeeper: (French Polynesia) Jonathan Torohia
- Fair play award: Brazil

The 2015 FIFA Beach Soccer World Cup was the eighth edition of the FIFA Beach Soccer World Cup, the premier international beach soccer competition for men's national teams, which has been organized by FIFA since 2005. Overall, this was the 18th edition of a world cup in beach soccer since the establishment of the Beach Soccer World Championships which ran from 1995 to 2004 but was not governed by FIFA. It was also the third edition to take place under the biennial system introduced in 2009.

The tournament took place from 9 to 19 July 2015 at Praia da Baía in Espinho, Portugal, after the country's bid was selected by the FIFA Executive Committee on 28 May 2013, from among twelve proposals. This was the second time that Portugal hosted a FIFA competition, after the 1991 FIFA World Youth Championship. Fifteen teams advanced through their respective continental qualification competitions to join the host team in the final tournament. The final draw occurred on 28 April 2015 at the Espinho Multimedia Auditorium, setting up a total of 32 matches that were played at the Espinho Stadium – a purpose-built temporary venue with a capacity of 3,500 – and attended by a total of 96,300 people.

After missing the previous edition, Portugal reached the final – eliminating two-time defending champions Russia in the semi-finals – and defeated first-time finalists Tahiti 5–3 to claim their second world title and their first in the FIFA era. Alan and Madjer were the only two surviving players from the Portuguese squad that won their previous world title in 2001 to also win these championships.

== Host selection ==
Twelve FIFA member associations from five confederations officially announced their interest in hosting the 2015 Beach Soccer World Cup by the deadline of 14 September 2012. On 28 May 2013, the FIFA Executive Committee, gathered in Mauritius, announced that the tournament would be held in Portugal. It was the second time that Portugal staged a FIFA competition, after the 1991 FIFA World Youth Championship.

Candidate associations:

- Brazil
- Bulgaria
- Ecuador
- (El Salvador) El Salvador
- France
- Hungary
- Mauritius
- Portugal (host)
- Russia
- Senegal
- Switzerland
- Thailand

== Qualification ==
Qualifying rounds took place in 2014 and 2015. Portugal qualified automatically as hosts.

=== African Zone ===
The CAF Beach Soccer Championship took place in Roche Caiman, Seychelles on 14–19 April 2015. A total of eight teams took part in the tournament, where seven spots (other than host nation Seychelles) were determined through qualifiers held in February and March 2015. The top two teams qualified for the 2015 FIFA Beach Soccer World Cup. Senegal and Madagascar won their respective semi-finals on 18 April 2015 to qualify for the World Cup, with Madagascar defeating Senegal in the final on the next day to win the tournament.

=== Asian Zone ===
The AFC Beach Soccer Championship took place in Doha, Qatar on 23–28 March 2015. A total of 14 teams took part in the tournament (Palestine entered but withdrew). The top three teams qualified for the 2015 FIFA Beach Soccer World Cup. Oman and Japan won their respective semi-finals on 27 March 2015 to qualify for the World Cup. On the next day, Iran won the third place match to also book a place in the World Cup, while Oman defeated Japan in the final to win the tournament.

=== European Zone ===
The UEFA qualifiers took place in Jesolo, Italy on 5–14 September 2014. A total of 23 teams took part in the tournament (Georgia entered but withdrew). The top four teams qualified for the 2015 FIFA Beach Soccer World Cup. Switzerland became the first team (other than host nation Portugal) to qualify for the 2015 FIFA Beach Soccer World Cup on 11 September 2014. On the next day, Russia, Spain and Italy also booked a place in the World Cup by advancing to the semi-finals, with Russia defeating Switzerland in the final two days later to win the tournament, and Italy defeating Spain to finish third.

=== North, Central American and Caribbean Zone ===
The CONCACAF Beach Soccer Championship took place in Costa del Sol, El Salvador on 28 March–4 April 2015. A total of 16 teams took part in the tournament. The top two teams qualified for the 2015 FIFA Beach Soccer World Cup. Mexico and Costa Rica won their respective semi-finals on 3 April 2015 to qualify for the World Cup, with Mexico defeating Costa Rica in the final on the next day to win the tournament.

=== Oceanian Zone ===
The OFC Beach Soccer Championship was scheduled to take place in Tahiti on 16–22 February 2015. However, the tournament was cancelled, and Tahiti were designated by the OFC as their representative.

=== South American Zone ===
The CONMEBOL Beach Soccer Championship took place in Manta, Ecuador on 19–26 April 2015. A total of 10 teams took part in the tournament. The top three teams qualified for the 2015 FIFA Beach Soccer World Cup. Brazil and Paraguay won their respective semi-finals on 25 April 2015 to qualify for the World Cup. On the next day, Argentina won the third place match to also book a place in the World Cup, while Brazil defeated Paraguay in the final to win the tournament.

== Teams ==
The following 16 teams qualified for the final tournament:

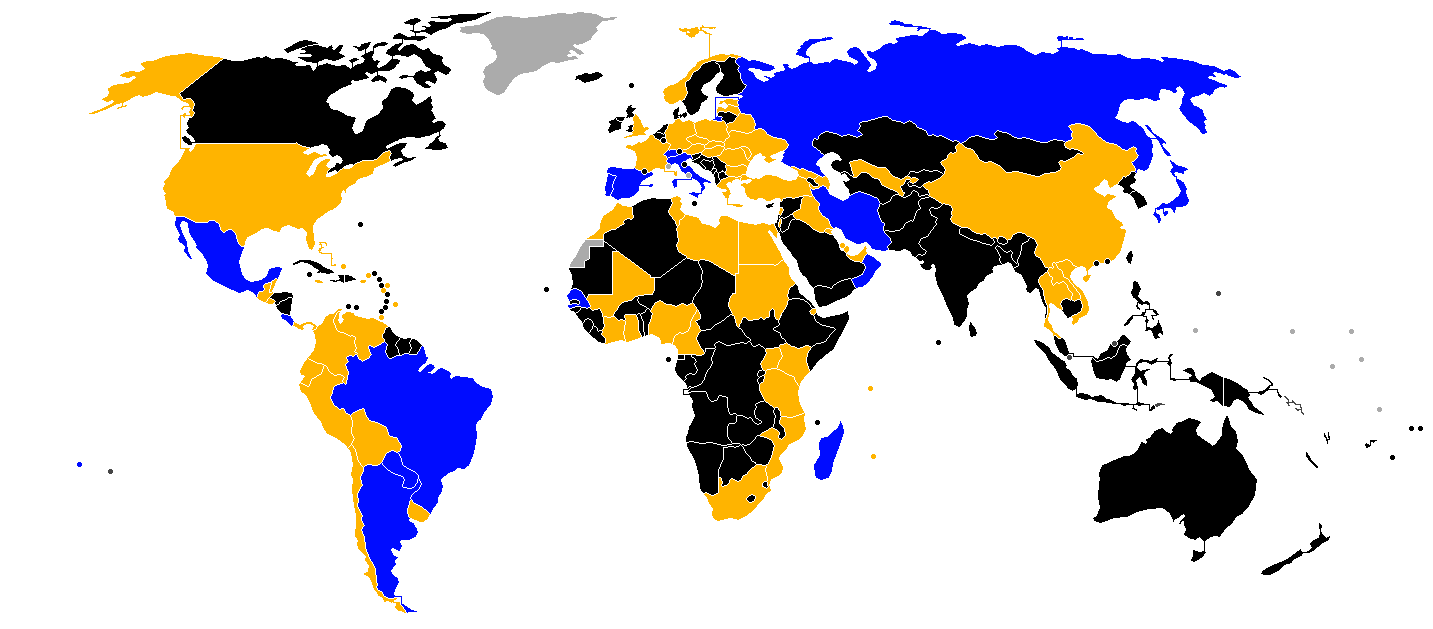
Qualified for World Cup finals Entered qualifying rounds but failed to qualify for World Cup finals (or withdrew) Did not enter the World Cup Not an associate member of FIFA

Confederation	Qualifying Tournament	Qualifier(s)
AFC (Asia)	2015 AFC Beach Soccer Championship	Iran; Japan; Oman
CAF (Africa)	2015 CAF Beach Soccer Championship	Madagascar^{1} Senegal
CONCACAF (North, Central America & Caribbean)	2015 CONCACAF Beach Soccer Championship	Costa Rica; Mexico
CONMEBOL (South America)	2015 CONMEBOL Beach Soccer Championship	Argentina; Brazil; Paraguay
OFC (Oceania)	Appointed by OFC (qualifying tournament cancelled)	Tahiti
UEFA (Europe)	Host nation	Portugal
UEFA (Europe)	2015 FIFA Beach Soccer World Cup qualification (UEFA)	Italy; Russia; Spain; Switzerland

Notes:

1. Teams that made their debut.

== Venue ==
All matches were played at the Espinho Stadium, a purpose-built 3,500-capacity venue located in Praia da Baía, Espinho.

Espinho	2015 FIFA Beach Soccer World Cup (Portugal)
Espinho Stadium	2015 FIFA Beach Soccer World Cup (Portugal)
41°00′N 08°38′W	2015 FIFA Beach Soccer World Cup (Portugal)
Capacity: 3,500	2015 FIFA Beach Soccer World Cup (Portugal)

== Referees ==
FIFA chose 24 officials from 24 different countries to referee matches at the World Cup, with at least one referee representing each confederation: four from AFC, three from CAF, five from CONMEBOL, three from CONCACAF, one from OFC and eight from UEFA.

AFC	CAF	CONCACAF	CONMEBOL	OFC	UEFA	
(China) Shao Liang (Malaysia) Suhaimi Mat Hassan (Oman) Turki Al-Salehi (Uzbekistan) Bakhtiyor Namazov	(Madagascar) Said Hachim (Nigeria) Jelili Ogunmuyiwa (Tunisia) Bessem Boubaker	(Costa Rica) Warner Porras (Dominican Republic) Juan Angeles (Puerto Rico) César Echevarria	(Argentina) Mariano Romo (Brazil) Ivo de Moraes (Paraguay) Gustavo Domínguez (Peru) Alex Valdiviezo (Uruguay) Javier Bentancor	(Solomon Islands) Hugo Pado	(Azerbaijan) Ingilab Mammadov (France) Sofien Benchabane (Italy) Gionni Matticoli (Lithuania) Laurynas Aržuolaitis	(Poland) Łukasz Ostrowski (Portugal) António Pereira (Russia) Roman Borisov (Spain) Rubén Eiriz

== Draw ==
The final draw was held on 28 April 2015 at the Espinho Multimedia Auditorium. The 16 teams were drawn into four groups of four teams, with hosts Portugal being seeded in Group A and defending champions Russia being seeded in Group D. Switzerland and Brazil, the second and third-ranked teams in the FIFA World Ranking, were the other two seeded teams. Teams from the same confederation could not be drawn against each other for the group stage, except one of the groups that must contain two UEFA teams as there were five UEFA teams.

Pot 1 (Seeds)	Pot 2 (AFC & OFC)	Pot 3 (CAF & CONCACAF)	Pot 4 (CONMEBOL & UEFA)
Portugal (assigned to A1); Russia (assigned to D1); Brazil; Switzerland	Iran; Japan; Oman; Tahiti	Madagascar; Senegal; Costa Rica; Mexico	Argentina; Paraguay; Italy; Spain

== Squads ==
Each team must name a squad of 12 players (two of whom must be goalkeepers) by the FIFA deadline. The squads were officially announced by FIFA on 2 July 2015.

== Group stage ==
In the group stage, teams earn three points for a win in regulation time, two points for a win in extra time, one point for a win in a penalty shoot-out, and no points for a defeat.

Following FIFA's rule changes issued in July 2014, this was the first World Cup to award just one point for a penalty shoot-out win (as opposed to two points in all previous World Cups) as well as penalty shoots outs being best of three rather than sudden death from the start.

All times are in WEST (UTC+1).

=== Tiebreaking ===
The ranking of each team in each group will be determined by the following criteria:

1. greatest number of points obtained in all group matches;

If two or more teams are equal on the basis of the above criterion, their rankings will be determined as follows:

2. greatest number of points obtained in the group matches between the teams concerned;
3. greatest goal difference resulting from the group matches between the teams concerned;
4. greatest number of goals scored in all group matches between the teams concerned;
5. greatest goal difference in all group matches;
6. greatest number of goals scored in all group matches;
7. drawing of lots by the FIFA Organising Committee.

=== Group A ===
Pos	Team	Pld	W	W+	WPK	L	GF	GA	GD	Pts	Qualification
1	Portugal (H)	3	2	0	0	1	16	10	+6	6 (Note: Portugal ahead of Japan on points obtained on head-to-head matches (Portugal defeated Japan 4–2))	Knockout stage
2	Japan	3	2	0	0	1	10	10	0	6	Knockout stage
3	Argentina	3	1	0	0	2	9	14	−5	3 (Note: Argentina ahead of Senegal on points obtained on head-to-head matches (Argentina defeated Senegal 4–3))	
4	Senegal	3	1	0	0	2	12	13	−1	3	

Source: FIFA
Rules for classification: 1) Points; 2) Points obtained in head-to-head matches; 3) Goal difference in head-to-head matches; 4) Goals scored in head-to-head matches; 5) Total goal difference; 6) Total goals scored; 7) Drawing of lots.
(H) Host
Notes:
9 July 2015
14:30

Portugal	4–2	Japan
Madjer 4', 22'; Bê Martins 18'; Alan 35'	Report	Haraguchi 23'; Matsuo 32'

Praia da Baía, Espinho
Attendance: 3,500
Referee: Juan Angeles (Dominican Republic)
9 July 2015
16:00

Argentina	4–3	Senegal
Franceschini 8'; F. Hilaire 11'; Sirico 19'; Minici 21'	Report	Baldé 5', 25'; Ndour 36'

Praia da Baía, Espinho
Attendance: 2,400
Referee: Sofien Benchabane (France)

11 July 2015
14:30

Senegal	6–5	Portugal
Thioune 9'; Kamara 16'; Baldé 25', 32'; Sylla 26'; Fall 29'	Report	Belchior 7', 31'; Coimbra 16'; Léo Martins 17'; Alan 19'

Praia da Baía, Espinho
Attendance: 3,500
Referee: Bakhtiyor Namazov (Uzbekistan)
11 July 2015
16:00

Japan	4–3	Argentina
Goto 15', 21'; Matsuo 16'; Oba 24'	Report	F. Hilaire 2'; Costas 21'; López 32'

Praia da Baía, Espinho
Attendance: 3,200
Referee: Roman Borisov (Russia)

13 July 2015
14:30

Portugal	7–2	Argentina
Belchior 9'; Madjer 12', 31'; Torres 16'; Alan 18', 29'; Zé Maria 36'	Report	Sirico 32' (pen.); S. Hilaire 33'

Praia da Baía, Espinho
Attendance: 3,500
Referee: Jelili Ogunmuyiwa (Nigeria)
13 July 2015
16:00

Japan	4–3	Senegal
Goto 1'; Tabata 10'; Matsuo 16'; Akaguma 21'	Report	Faye 33'; N'Doye 34'; Fall 36'

Praia da Baía, Espinho
Attendance: 3,100
Referee: Gustavo Domínguez (Paraguay)

=== Group B ===
Pos	Team	Pld	W	W+	WPK	L	GF	GA	GD	Pts	Qualification
1	Italy	3	3	0	0	0	16	7	+9	9	Knockout stage
2	Switzerland	3	2	0	0	1	13	11	+2	6	Knockout stage
3	Oman	3	1	0	0	2	11	11	0	3	
4	Costa Rica	3	0	0	0	3	6	17	−11	0	

Source: FIFA
Rules for classification: 1) Points; 2) Points obtained in head-to-head matches; 3) Goal difference in head-to-head matches; 4) Goals scored in head-to-head matches; 5) Total goal difference; 6) Total goals scored; 7) Drawing of lots.
9 July 2015
13:00

Italy	6–1	Costa Rica
Gori 1', 9', 16'; Zurlo 13', 19'; Villegas 19' (o.g.)	Report	Pacheco 6'

Praia da Baía, Espinho
Attendance: 3,400
Referee: Ivo de Moraes (Brazil)
9 July 2015
17:30

Switzerland	5–2	Oman
Misev 4'; Ott 10', 12', 21'; Leu 14'	Report	Al-Sauti 7'; K. Al-Araimi 19'

Praia da Baía, Espinho
Attendance: 1,800
Referee: Jelili Ogunmuyiwa (Nigeria)

11 July 2015
13:00

Oman	2–4	Italy
Y. Al-Araimi 8'; K. Al-Araimi 22'	Report	Zurlo 12', 30'; Marinai 12'; Gori 19'

Praia da Baía, Espinho
Attendance: 3,450
Referee: Bessem Boubaker (Tunisia)
11 July 2015
17:30

Costa Rica	3–4	Switzerland
Mendoza 24'; Adanis 30'; Pacheco 35'	Report	Stankovic 3'; Ott 11'; Leu 21'; Borer 35'

Praia da Baía, Espinho
Attendance: 2,500
Referee: Mariano Romo (Argentina)

13 July 2015
13:00

Oman	7–2	Costa Rica
Al-Dhabit 4', 26' (pen.); Y. Al-Araimi 17', 26'; Al-Alawi 19'; Al-Qassmi 32', 36'	Report	Johnson 19', 28' (pen.)

Praia da Baía, Espinho
Attendance: 3,500
Referee: Bessem Boubaker (Tunisia)
13 July 2015
17:30

Switzerland	4–6	Italy
Ott 4', 10'; Schirinzi 5'; Stankovic 34'	Report	Zurlo 3'; Gori 4'; Palmacci 15', 31'; Marinai 17'; Frainetti 21' (pen.)

Praia da Baía, Espinho
Attendance: 3,200
Referee: António Pereira (Portugal)

=== Group C ===
Pos	Team	Pld	W	W+	WPK	L	GF	GA	GD	Pts	Qualification
1	Brazil	3	3	0	0	0	11	5	+6	9	Knockout stage
2	Iran	3	2	0	0	1	12	11	+1	6	Knockout stage
3	Spain	3	1	0	0	2	9	9	0	3	
4	Mexico	3	0	0	0	3	4	11	−7	0	

Source: FIFA
Rules for classification: 1) Points; 2) Points obtained in head-to-head matches; 3) Goal difference in head-to-head matches; 4) Goals scored in head-to-head matches; 5) Total goal difference; 6) Total goals scored; 7) Drawing of lots.
10 July 2015
13:00

Spain	5–6	Iran
Antonio 2', 15', 31'; Nico 3'; Llorenç 8'	Report	Boloukbashi 2', 15'; Mesigar 5'; Mokhtari 19', 36'; Ahmadzadeh 34'

Praia da Baía, Espinho
Attendance: 1,900
Referee: Javier Bentancor (Uruguay)
10 July 2015
17:30

Brazil	5–1	Mexico
Rodrigo 1'; Bokinha 6'; Bruno Xavier 12'; Gonzalez 26' (o.g.); Mauricinho 29'	Report	Maldonado 31'

Praia da Baía, Espinho
Attendance: 3,500
Referee: Łukasz Ostrowski (Poland)

12 July 2015
13:00

Mexico	1–3	Spain
Maldonado 1' (pen.)	Report	Llorenç 3'; Nico 17'; Antonio 35' (pen.)

Praia da Baía, Espinho
Attendance: 2,500
Referee: Turki Al-Salehi (Oman)
12 July 2015
17:30

Iran	3–4	Brazil
Akbari 2', 4'; Ahmadzadeh 5'	Report	Ddi 2'; Bruno Xavier 12'; Bokinha 12'; Mauricinho 26'

Praia da Baía, Espinho
Attendance: 3,500
Referee: Gionni Matticoli (Italy)

14 July 2015
13:00

Mexico	2–3	Iran
Gómez 19'; Villa 22'	Report	Akbari 2'; Ahmadzadeh 15'; Dara 15'

Praia da Baía, Espinho
Attendance: 1,600
Referee: Laurynas Aržuolaitis (Lithuania)
14 July 2015
17:30

Brazil	2–1	Spain
Rodrigo 2', 32'	Report	Mérida 12'

Praia da Baía, Espinho
Attendance: 3,500
Referee: Bakhtiyor Namazov (Uzbekistan)

=== Group D ===
Pos	Team	Pld	W	W+	WPK	L	GF	GA	GD	Pts	Qualification
1	Tahiti	3	3	0	0	0	18	14	+4	9	Knockout stage
2	Russia	3	2	0	0	1	17	14	+3	6	Knockout stage
3	Paraguay	3	1	0	0	2	14	16	−2	3	
4	Madagascar	3	0	0	0	3	7	12	−5	0	

Source: FIFA
Rules for classification: 1) Points; 2) Points obtained in head-to-head matches; 3) Goal difference in head-to-head matches; 4) Goals scored in head-to-head matches; 5) Total goal difference; 6) Total goals scored; 7) Drawing of lots.
10 July 2015
14:30

Russia	7–5	Paraguay
Romanov 7', 15'; Shishin 8', 28', 30'; Shkarin 23'; Leonov 25'	Report	López 1'; Moran 3', 17', 34'; Rodriguez 18' (pen.)

Praia da Baía, Espinho
Attendance: 2,100
Referee: Suhaimi Mat Hassan (Malaysia)
10 July 2015
16:00

Tahiti	4–3	Madagascar
Labaste 4'; Tepa 5'; Tavanae 9'; Bennett 17' (pen.)	Report	Razafimandimby 2'; Rabeasimbola 2'; Razafimahatratra 6'

Praia da Baía, Espinho
Attendance: 2,400
Referee: Rubén Eiriz (Spain)

12 July 2015
14:30

Madagascar	2–4	Russia
Rasolomandimby 17'; Randriamampandry 19'	Report	Leonov 6'; Romanov 7', 9'; Krasheninnikov 35'

Praia da Baía, Espinho
Attendance: 2,700
Referee: Warner Porras (Costa Rica)
12 July 2015
16:00

Paraguay	5–7	Tahiti
Moran 2', 18', 25'; López 27'; Barreto 35'	Report	Tavanae 2'; Labaste 4', 27'; Zaveroni 8'; Tchen 8'; Tepa 14'; Taiarui 25'

Praia da Baía, Espinho
Attendance: 3,500
Referee: César Echevarria (Puerto Rico)

14 July 2015
14:30

Russia	6–7	Tahiti
Bukhlitskiy 8'; Shishin 8'; Paporotnyi 20'; Krasheninnikov 23'; Romanov 35'; Makarov 35'	Report	Li Fung Kuee 2', 9', 14', 27'; Taiarui 8'; Lehartel 23'; Torohia 35'

Praia da Baía, Espinho
Attendance: 2,600
Referee: Alex Valdiviezo (Peru)
14 July 2015
16:00

Paraguay	4–2	Madagascar
Moran 11', 27'; López 17'; Rolon 26'	Report	Rasolomandimby 13', 26'

Praia da Baía, Espinho
Attendance: 3,100
Referee: Ingilab Mammadov (Azerbaijan)

== Knockout stage ==
=== Bracket ===
Quarter-finals
16 July
Italy	3
Japan	2
16 July
Tahiti	5
Iran	4
16 July
Portugal	7
Switzerland	3
16 July
Brazil	5
Russia (a.e.t.)	6

Semi-finals
18 July
Italy	6 (1)
Tahiti (p)	6 (3)
18 July
Portugal	4
Russia	2

Final
19 July
Tahiti	3
Portugal	5
Third place match
19 July
Italy	2
Russia	5

=== Quarter-finals ===
16 July 2015
14:00

Brazil	5–6 (a.e.t.)	Russia
Mão 9'; Datinha 9'; Mauricinho 9'; Bokinha 31' (pen.); Bruno Xavier 32'	Report	Paporotnyi 3'; Shkarin 8'; Shishin 13'; Peremitin 29'; Romanov 31'; Shaykov 39'

Praia da Baía, Espinho
Attendance: 3,500
Referee: Jelili Ogunmuyiwa (Nigeria)
16 July 2015
15:30

Portugal	7–3	Switzerland
Leu 2' (o.g.); Madjer 13', 25', 32'; Andrade 14'; Belchior 15'; Coimbra 27'	Report	Ott 11', 29' (pen.); Stankovic 15'

Praia da Baía, Espinho
Attendance: 3,500
Referee: Bakhtiyor Namazov (Uzbekistan)
16 July 2015
17:00

Italy	3–2	Japan
Zurlo 12', 35'; Ramacciotti 22'	Report	Ozu 1'; Goto 26'

Praia da Baía, Espinho
Attendance: 2,650
Referee: Ivo de Moraes (Brazil)
16 July 2015
18:30

Tahiti	5–4	Iran
Bennett 11', 14'; Tepa 27'; Li Fung Kuee 30'; Taiarui 32'	Report	Ahmadzadeh 13'; Morshedi 14'; Mesigar 27'; Mokhtari 31'

Praia da Baía, Espinho
Attendance: 2,700
Referee: Rubén Eiriz (Spain)

=== Semi-finals ===
18 July 2015
17:00

Italy	6–6 (a.e.t.)	Tahiti
Palmacci 4'; Gori 22', 34'; Ramacciotti 26'; Di Palma 28'; Corosiniti 34'	Report	Taiarui 1'; Labaste 4'; Bennett 14', 26'; Tavanae 23'; Tepa 33'
Penalties
Frainetti (penalty scored); Palmacci (penalty missed)	1–3	Taiarui (penalty scored); Bennett (penalty scored); Li Fung Kuee (penalty scored)

Praia da Baía, Espinho
Attendance: 3,500
Referee: Jelili Ogunmuyiwa (Nigeria)
18 July 2015
18:30

Portugal	4–2	Russia
Jordan 9'; Bê Martins 12', 35'; Novo 34'	Report	Makarov 8'; Shishin 14'

Praia da Baía, Espinho
Attendance: 3,500
Referee: Łukasz Ostrowski (Poland)

=== Third place match ===
19 July 2015
17:00

Italy	2–5	Russia
Palmacci 26'; Marinai 33'	Report	Shaykov 4'; Peremitin 11', 14'; Romanov 12'; Paporotnyi 19'

Praia da Baía, Espinho
Attendance: 3,500
Referee: Suhaimi Mat Hassan (Malaysia)

=== Final ===
19 July 2015
18:30

Tahiti	3–5	Portugal
Labaste 17'; Li Fung Kuee 19', 25'	Report	Madjer 1'; Belchior 7'; Coimbra 17'; Novo 21'; Alan 36'

Praia da Baía, Espinho
Attendance: 3,500
Referee: Rubén Eiriz (Spain)

== Awards ==
In the aftermath of the final, FIFA presented individual awards to the three best players of the tournament, top goal-scorers, and to the best goalkeeper. In addition, a collective award was given to the team with the most points in the Fair Play ranking. Since three players all scored 8 goals, other stats such as assists, penalties and matches played were then considered to work out the standings between them. Notably, this World Cup saw the fewest goals ever scored for a player to claim the golden boot.

adidas Golden Ball	adidas Silver Ball	adidas Bronze Ball
(French Polynesia) Heimanu Taiarui	(Portugal) Alan	(Portugal) Madjer
adidas Golden Scorer	adidas Silver Scorer	adidas Bronze Scorer
(Paraguay) Pedro Moran	(Portugal) Madjer	(Switzerland) Noel Ott
8 goals	8 goals	8 goals
adidas Golden Glove
(French Polynesia) Jonathan Torohia
FIFA Fair Play Award
Brazil
Goal of the tournament
(Portugal) Madjer v Switzerland

== Statistics ==
=== Goalscorers ===
8 goals

- (Paraguay) Pedro Moran
- (Portugal) Madjer
- (Switzerland) Noel Ott

7 goals

- (Italy) Gabriele Gori
- (Italy) Emmanuele Zurlo
- (Russia) Kirill Romanov
- (French Polynesia) Raimana Li Fung Kuee

6 goals

- (Russia) Dmitrii Shishin

5 goals

- (Portugal) Alan
- (Portugal) Belchior
- (French Polynesia) Naea Bennett
- (French Polynesia) Tearii Labaste

4 goals

- (Iran) Mohammad Ahmadzadeh
- (Italy) Paolo Palmacci
- (Japan) Takasuke Goto
- (Senegal) Ibrahima Baldé
- (Spain) Antonio
- (French Polynesia) Heimanu Taiarui
- (French Polynesia) Patrick Tepa

3 goals

- (Brazil) Bokinha
- (Brazil) Bruno Xavier
- (Brazil) Mauricinho
- (Brazil) Rodrigo
- (Iran) Amir Akbari
- (Iran) Mohammad Ali Mokhtari
- (Italy) Simone Marinai
- (Japan) Naoya Matsuo
- (Madagascar) Bernardin Rasolomandimby
- (Oman) Yahya Al-Araimi
- (Paraguay) Juan López
- (Portugal) Bê Martins
- (Portugal) Rui Coimbra
- (Russia) Artur Paporotnyi
- (Russia) Anatoliy Peremitin
- (Switzerland) Dejan Stankovic
- (French Polynesia) Heiarii Tavanae

2 goals

- (Argentina) Federico Hilaire
- (Argentina) Luciano Sirico
- (Costa Rica) Danny Johnson
- (Costa Rica) Greivin Pacheco
- (Iran) Farid Boloukbashi
- (Iran) Moslem Mesigar
- (Italy) Dario Ramacciotti
- (Mexico) Ramon Maldonado
- (Oman) Hani Al-Dhabit
- (Oman) Ishaq Al-Qassmi
- (Oman) Khalid Al-Araimi
- (Portugal) Bruno Novo
- (Russia) Yury Krasheninnikov
- (Russia) Ilya Leonov
- (Russia) Aleksey Makarov
- (Russia) Egor Shaykov
- (Russia) Anton Shkarin
- (Senegal) Babacar Fall
- (Spain) Llorenç
- (Spain) Nico
- (Switzerland) Stephan Leu

1 goal

- (Argentina) Federico Costas
- (Argentina) Luciano Franceschini
- (Argentina) Santiago Hilaire
- (Argentina) Rodrigo López
- (Argentina) Facundo Minici
- (Brazil) Datinha
- (Brazil) Fernando Ddi
- (Brazil) Mão
- (Costa Rica) José Mendoza
- (Costa Rica) Vladimir Adanis
- (Iran) Faroogh Dara
- (Iran) Mehran Morshedi
- (Italy) Francesco Corosiniti
- (Italy) Michele di Palma
- (Italy) Alessio Frainetti
- (Japan) Takuya Akaguma
- (Japan) Shotaro Haraguchi
- (Japan) Ozu Moreira
- (Japan) Takaaki Oba
- (Japan) Teruki Tabata
- (Madagascar) Tianasoa Rabeasimbola
- (Madagascar) Tokindrainy Randriamampandry
- (Madagascar) Flavien Razafimahatratra
- (Madagascar) Ymelda Razafimandimby
- (Mexico) Gerardo Gómez
- (Mexico) Abdiel Villa
- (Oman) Ghaith Al-Alawi
- (Oman) Abdullah Al-Sauti
- (Paraguay) Édgar Barreto
- (Paraguay) Wilson Rodriguez
- (Paraguay) Jesús Rolon
- (Portugal) Elinton Andrade
- (Portugal) Léo Martins
- (Portugal) Jordan Santos
- (Portugal) Bruno Torres
- (Portugal) Zé Maria
- (Russia) Andrey Bukhlitskiy
- (Senegal) Gorgui Faye
- (Senegal) Pape Amadou Kamara
- (Senegal) Papa Ndour
- (Senegal) Papa Modou N'Doye
- (Senegal) Ngalla Sylla
- (Senegal) Ibra Thioune
- (Spain) Raúl Mérida
- (Switzerland) Philipp Borer
- (Switzerland) Michael Misev
- (Switzerland) Angelo Schirinzi
- (French Polynesia) Tainui Lehartel
- (French Polynesia) Angelo Tchen
- (French Polynesia) Jonathan Torohia
- (French Polynesia) Teva Zaveroni

Own goals

- (Costa Rica) Andres Villegas (against Italy)
- (Mexico) Adrian Gonzalez (against Brazil)
- (Switzerland) Stephan Leu (against Portugal)

=== Final standings ===
Pos	Grp	Team	Pld	W	WE	WP	L	GF	GA	GD	Pts	Final result
1	A	Portugal (H)	6	5	0	0	1	32	18	+14	15	Champions
2	D	Tahiti	6	4	0	1	1	32	29	+3	13	Runners-up
3	D	Russia	6	3	1	0	2	30	25	+5	11	Third place
4	B	Italy	6	4	0	0	2	27	20	+7	12	Fourth place
5	C	Brazil	4	3	0	0	1	16	11	+5	9	Eliminated in Quarter-finals
6	C	Iran	4	2	0	0	2	16	16	0	6	Eliminated in Quarter-finals
7	A	Japan	4	2	0	0	2	12	13	−1	6	Eliminated in Quarter-finals
8	B	Switzerland	4	2	0	0	2	16	18	−2	6	Eliminated in Quarter-finals
9	B	Oman	3	1	0	0	2	11	11	0	3	Eliminated in Group stage
10	C	Spain	3	1	0	0	2	9	9	0	3	Eliminated in Group stage
11	A	Senegal	3	1	0	0	2	12	13	−1	3	Eliminated in Group stage
12	D	Paraguay	3	1	0	0	2	14	16	−2	3	Eliminated in Group stage
13	A	Argentina	3	1	0	0	2	9	14	−5	3	Eliminated in Group stage
14	D	Madagascar	3	0	0	0	3	7	12	−5	0	Eliminated in Group stage
15	C	Mexico	3	0	0	0	3	4	11	−7	0	Eliminated in Group stage
16	B	Costa Rica	3	0	0	0	3	6	17	−11	0	Eliminated in Group stage

Source: FIFA
(H) Host
