= Beach soccer at the 2010 Asian Beach Games =

- Venue: Al-Musannah Sports City
- Dates: 8–16 December 2010

Beach soccer at the 2010 Asian Beach Games was held from 8 December to 16 December 2010 in Muscat, Oman. The United Arab Emirates won the gold medal.

== Medalists ==
Event	Gold	Silver	Bronze
Men	United Arab Emirates; Abbas Hussain; Qambar Sadeqi; Mohamed Bashir; Rashid Ahmed Hassan; Ali Kozad; Ibrahim Al-Balooshi; Rami Al-Mesaabi; Ali Hassan Karim; Adel Ranjabar; Humaid Al-Balooshi	Oman; Salim Al-Abri; Khalid Al-Zaabi; Jalal Al-Sinani; Yahya Al-Araimi; Nasser Zayid; Ishaq Al-Qassmi; Yaqoob Al-Alawi; Faisal Al-Balushi; Hani Al-Dhabit; Khalid Al-Dhanki	Iran; Mehdi Bahrololoum; Farough Dara; Hassan Abdollahi; Ali Naderi; Hamid Reza Zareei; Mehran Morshedizadeh; Farid Boloukbashi; Moslem Mesigar; Mohammad Ahmadzadeh; Mohammad Reza Hajipour

== Results ==
=== First round ===
==== Group A ====
Pos	Team	Pld	W	W+	L	GF	GA	GD	Pts
1	United Arab Emirates	3	2	1	0	14	8	+6	8
2	Yemen	3	2	0	1	16	14	+2	6
3	Uzbekistan	3	1	0	2	12	12	0	3
4	Qatar	3	0	0	3	7	15	−8	0

Source: Official website
9 December
15:00

Uzbekistan	5–3	Qatar
Narzullaev 15', 19', 28'; Azizov 20'; Anorov 33'		Al-Ishaq 7', 24'; Z. Al-Kuwari 30'

Al-Musannah Sports City, Muscat
Referee: Waleed Ali Yousef (United Arab Emirates)

9 December
17:30

Yemen	4–7	United Arab Emirates
O. Saeed 4'; G. Saeed 13'; F. Naseer 30', 33'		Karim 1', 30'; Sadeqi 10'; Ranjabar 16'; Bashir 22'; Hassan 21', 33' (pen.)

Al-Musannah Sports City, Muscat
Referee: Turki Al-Salehi (Oman)

11 December
15:00

Uzbekistan	4–6	Yemen
Narzullaev 6'; Mirakhmedov 12' (pen.), 18'; Azizov 36'		O. Saeed 8'; Al-Tsasli 11'; Mohammed 13'; Haidarah 16'; M. Naseer 18', 27'

Al-Musannah Sports City, Muscat
Referee: Abdulaziz Abdullah (Kuwait)

11 December
17:30

United Arab Emirates	4–1	Qatar
H. Al-Balooshi 3'; Karim 6'; I. Al-Balooshi 16'; Ranjabar 25'		Al-Ishaq 2'

Al-Musannah Sports City, Muscat
Referee: Moon Yong-bae (South Korea)

13 December
15:00

Qatar	3–6	Yemen
Al-Ishaq 5', 34'; Al-Mazroai 12'		G. Saeed 16'; M. Naseer 20', 22'; Al-Tsasli 26'; F. Naseer 29', 30'

Al-Musannah Sports City, Muscat
Referee: Turki Al-Salehi (Oman)

13 December
17:30

United Arab Emirates	3–3 (a.e.t.)	Uzbekistan
Ranjabar 3'; Hassan 27'; Kozad 36'		Azizov 13', 14'; Narzullaev 24'
Penalties
Karim (penalty missed); Bashir (penalty scored)	1–0	(penalty missed) Mirakhmedov; (penalty missed) Anorov

Al-Musannah Sports City, Muscat
Referee: Abdulaziz Abdullah (Kuwait)

==== Group B ====
Pos	Team	Pld	W	W+	L	GF	GA	GD	Pts
1	Oman	3	3	0	0	22	10	+12	9
2	Syria	3	2	0	1	13	12	+1	6
3	Indonesia	3	1	0	2	9	15	−6	3
4	Athletes from Kuwait	3	0	0	3	11	18	−7	0

Source: Official website
9 December
16:15

Indonesia	5–2	Athletes from Kuwait
Darmasuta 8'; Metrajaya 12', 20'; Dwipayudha 29'; Parimawan 36'		Al-Jaser 16'; Al-Buloushi 33' (pen.)

Al-Musannah Sports City, Muscat
Referee: Farshid Haghighatjoo (Iran)

9 December
18:45

Syria	2–7	Oman
Biazid 19', 20'		Al-Sinani 2', 8'; Al-Qassmi 6'; Al-Balushi 9', 18'; Al-Araimi 10'; Al-Dhabit 29'

Al-Musannah Sports City, Muscat
Referee: Tasuku Onodera (Japan)

11 December
16:15

Indonesia	0–4	Syria
		Biazid 12', 29', 32'; Chlhoum 21'

Al-Musannah Sports City, Muscat
Referee: Bakhtiyor Namazov (Uzbekistan)

11 December
18:45

Oman	6–4	Athletes from Kuwait
Al-Sinani 7', 23' (pen.); Al-Dhabit 7'; Al-Araimi 10'; Al-Balushi 18' (pen.); Al-Alawi 19'		Al-Subaie 17'; Al-Eid 20'; Al-Jaser 23', 35'

Al-Musannah Sports City, Muscat
Referee: Suhaimi Mat Hassan (Malaysia)

13 December
16:15

Athletes from Kuwait	5–7	Syria
Al-Subaie 9'; Al-Jaser 17', 36'; Al-Najjar 24' (o.g.); Al-Safi 31'		Sleman 5', 23'; Biazid 8', 16'; Kbaili 15', 27', 28'

Al-Musannah Sports City, Muscat
Referee: Chaireag Ngamsom (Thailand)

13 December
18:45

Oman	9–4	Indonesia
Al-Araimi 1'; Al-Sinani 5', 25'; Al-Alawi 7', 24'; Al-Qassmi 15', 31'; Al-Dhabit 16'; Al-Balushi 25'		Darmasuta 9'; Zayid 12' (o.g.); Putra 24'; Jumada 30'

Al-Musannah Sports City, Muscat
Referee: Waleed Ali Yousef (United Arab Emirates)

==== Group C ====
Pos	Team	Pld	W	W+	L	GF	GA	GD	Pts
1	Iran	3	3	0	0	25	7	+18	9
2	Japan	3	2	0	1	12	5	+7	6
3	Lebanon	3	1	0	2	12	16	−4	3
4	Thailand	3	0	0	3	8	29	−21	0

Source: Official website
8 December
9:00

Japan	8–2	Thailand
Saetiaw 2' (o.g.); Goto 8', 10', 24', 33' (pen.); Kawaharazuka 11', 18', 27'		Sonwist 17'; Saetiaw 35'

Al-Musannah Sports City, Muscat
Referee: Ebrahim Al-Mansoori (United Arab Emirates)

8 December
11:30

Lebanon	4–9	Iran
Merhi 6' (pen.), 7', 20' (pen.); Fattal 26'		Ahmadzadeh 6', 11', 14', 22'; Boloukbashi 15'; Abdollahi 16', 36'; Morshedizadeh 19', 28'

Al-Musannah Sports City, Muscat
Referee: Abdullah Al-Rashdi (Oman)

10 December
15:00

Japan	3–1	Lebanon
Toma 1'; Kawaharazuka 18'; Uehara 32'		Fattal 31'

Al-Musannah Sports City, Muscat
Referee: Mohammad Essa (Syria)

10 December
17:30

Iran	14–2	Thailand
Naderi 2', 12', 19', 25'; Abdollahi 5'; Ahmadzadeh 14', 21', 29', 36'; Mesigar 15'; Zareei 21' (pen.); Boloukbashi 22', 30'; Dara 31'		Mansiri 11'; Sonwist 32'

Al-Musannah Sports City, Muscat
Referee: Li Ke (China)

12 December
15:00

Thailand	4–7	Lebanon
Sonwist 5', 20', 31'; Saetiaw 19'		Fattal 11', 32', 34'; Merhi 11', 29' (pen.); Al-Zein 16', 36'

Al-Musannah Sports City, Muscat
Referee: Moon Yong-bae (South Korea)

12 December
17:30

Iran	2–1	Japan
Abdollahi 18'; Boloukbashi 33'		Uehara 35'

Al-Musannah Sports City, Muscat
Referee: Bakhtiyor Namazov (Uzbekistan)

==== Group D ====
Pos	Team	Pld	W	W+	L	GF	GA	GD	Pts
1	China	3	3	0	0	12	7	+5	9
2	Bahrain	3	1	1	1	8	6	+2	5
3	Palestine	3	1	0	2	11	10	+1	3
4	Vietnam	3	0	0	3	9	17	−8	0

Source: Official website
8 December
10:15

China	5–2	Vietnam
Wan Chao 10' (pen.), 32'; Lu Changhai 11'; Gui Qixuan 21'; Wang Qi 24'		Trần Hữu Phúc 33'; Bùi Trần Tuấn Anh 36'

Al-Musannah Sports City, Muscat
Referee: Tasuku Onodera (Japan)

8 December
12:45

Palestine	0–2	Bahrain
		J. Al-Doseri 26'; Mubarak 32'

Al-Musannah Sports City, Muscat
Referee: Farshid Haghighatjoo (Iran)

10 December
16:15

China	5–4	Palestine
Yilihanmu Aihaiti 9', 10'; Han Yingnan 17', 28'; Han Xuegeng 19'		Shbair 16', 32' (pen.), 34'; Salim 19'

Al-Musannah Sports City, Muscat
Referee: Ramin Haghighizadeh (Iran)

10 December
18:45

Bahrain	5–4 (a.e.t.)	Vietnam
T. Al-Doseri 1'; J. Al-Doseri 8'; H. Al-Doseri 11', 15'; Mubarak 38'		Bùi Trần Tuấn Anh 6', 19'; Trần Hữu Phúc 14' (pen.); Nguyễn Xuân Huy 35'

Al-Musannah Sports City, Muscat
Referee: Suhaimi Mat Hassan (Malaysia)

12 December
16:15

Vietnam	3–7	Palestine
Bùi Trần Tuấn Anh 3'; Đỗ Văn Nam 24'; Trần Hữu Phúc 36'		Shbair 1', 2', 11' (pen.), 17', 18', 36'; Al-Tahrawi 22'

Al-Musannah Sports City, Muscat
Referee: Farshid Haghighatjoo (Iran)

12 December
18:45

Bahrain	1–2	China
Marhoon 27'		Wan Chao 12'; Han Xuegeng 25' (pen.)

Al-Musannah Sports City, Muscat
Referee: Tasuku Onodera (Japan)

=== Knockout round ===
Quarterfinals
14 December
China	6
Syria	5
14 December
United Arab Emirates (p)	2 (2)
Japan	2 (1)
14 December
Iran	8
Yemen	3
14 December
Oman	6
Bahrain	1

Semifinals
15 December
China	1
United Arab Emirates	5
15 December
Iran	1
Oman	4

Gold medal match
16 December
United Arab Emirates (p)	2 (1)
Oman	2 (0)
Bronze medal match
16 December
China	1
Iran	6

==== Quarterfinals ====
14 December
15:00

China	6–5	Syria
Tuluxun Maimaiti 10'; Han Xuegeng 17', 33'; Wan Chao 17'; Qiu Hao 24'; Gui Qixuan 34'		Akil 4'; Kbaili 5'; Biazid 14', 28'; Sleman 24'

Al-Musannah Sports City, Muscat
Referee: Ramin Haghighizadeh (Iran)

14 December
16:15

Iran	8–3	Yemen
Mesigar 8'; Naderi 8', 10', 33'; Ahmadzadeh 13'; Morshedizadeh 14' (pen.); Abdollahi 31', 32'		O. Saeed 8', 18'; M. Naseer 24'

Al-Musannah Sports City, Muscat
Referee: Waleed Ali Yousef (United Arab Emirates)

14 December
17:30

United Arab Emirates	2–2 (a.e.t.)	Japan
Sadeqi 10'; Karim 14'		Kawaharazuka 32'; Goto 34'
Penalties
Bashir (penalty scored); Karim (penalty scored)	2–1	(penalty scored) Makino; (penalty missed) Uehara

Al-Musannah Sports City, Muscat
Referee: Suhaimi Mat Hassan (Malaysia)

14 December
18:45

Oman	6–1	Bahrain
Al-Qassmi 1', 8', 36'; Al-Balushi 15', 18'; Zayid 20'		Marhoon 10'

Al-Musannah Sports City, Muscat
Referee: Tasuku Onodera (Japan)

==== Semifinals ====
15 December
17:30

China	1–5	United Arab Emirates
Qiu Hao 2'		Karim 1'; Hassan 2', 26'; Sadeqi 20', 36'

Al-Musannah Sports City, Muscat
Referee: Farshid Haghighatjoo (Iran)

15 December
18:45

Iran	1–4	Oman
Abdollahi 36'		Al-Araimi 6', 36'; Al-Alawi 15'; Al-Dhabit 29'

Al-Musannah Sports City, Muscat
Referee: Ebrahim Al-Mansoori (United Arab Emirates)

==== Bronze medal match ====
16 December
13:45

China	1–6	Iran
Wang Qi 5'		Naderi 5', 18'; Abdollahi 7'; Bahrololoum 19'; Boloukbashi 22'; Mesigar 26'

Al-Musannah Sports City, Muscat
Referee: Abdullah Al-Rashdi (Oman)

==== Gold medal match ====
16 December
15:00

United Arab Emirates	2–2 (a.e.t.)	Oman
Karim 18'; Hassan 27'		Al-Alawi 11'; Al-Araimi 14'
Penalties
Karim (penalty scored)	1–0	(penalty missed) Al-Araimi

Al-Musannah Sports City, Muscat
Referee: Tasuku Onodera (Japan)

== Goalscorers ==
9 goals

- Mohammad Ahmadzadeh (IRI)
- Ali Naderi (IRI)
- Hamada Shbair (PLE)
- Al-Said Biazid (SYR)

8 goals

- Hassan Abdollahi (IRI)

6 goals

- Yahya Al-Araimi (OMA)
- Faisal Al-Balushi (OMA)
- Ishaq Al-Qassmi (OMA)
- Jalal Al-Sinani (OMA)
- Rashid Ahmed Hassan (UAE)
- Ali Hassan Karim (UAE)

5 goals

- Omar Al-Jaser (IOC)
- Farid Boloukbashi (IRI)
- Takasuke Goto (JPN)
- Takeshi Kawaharazuka (JPN)
- Haitham Fattal (LIB)
- Mohamad Merhi (LIB)
- Yaqoob Al-Alawi (OMA)
- Abdulla Al-Ishaq (QAT)
- Chana Sonwist (THA)
- Otabek Narzullaev (UZB)
- Mohammed Naseer (YEM)

4 goals

- Han Xuegeng (CHN)
- Wan Chao (CHN)
- Hani Al-Dhabit (OMA)
- Hussam Kbaili (SYR)
- Qambar Sadeqi (UAE)
- Furkat Azizov (UZB)
- Bùi Trần Tuấn Anh (VIE)
- Fadhl Naseer (YEM)
- Omar Saeed (YEM)

3 goals

- Moslem Mesigar (IRI)
- Mehran Morshedizadeh (IRI)
- Ali Sleman (SYR)
- Adel Ranjabar (UAE)
- Trần Hữu Phúc (VIE)

2 goals

- Husain Al-Doseri (BRN)
- Jasim Al-Doseri (BRN)
- Sadeq Marhoon (BRN)
- Ayoob Mubarak (BRN)
- Gui Qixuan (CHN)
- Han Yingnan (CHN)
- Qiu Hao (CHN)
- Wang Qi (CHN)
- Yilihanmu Aihaiti (CHN)
- Gede Darmasuta (INA)
- Wayan Metrajaya (INA)
- Mubarak Al-Subaie (IOC)
- Tomoya Uehara (JPN)
- Moustafa Al-Zein (LIB)
- Auttapon Saetiaw (THA)
- Farkhod Mirakhmedov (UZB)
- Saleh Al-Tsasli (YEM)
- Gamal Saeed (YEM)

1 goal

- Thani Al-Doseri (BRN)
- Lu Changhai (CHN)
- Tuluxun Maimaiti (CHN)
- Dewa Kadek Dwipayudha (INA)
- Nyoman Jumada (INA)
- Juli Parimawan (INA)
- Putu Edy Sandi Putra (INA)
- Ahmad Al-Buloushi (IOC)
- Abdulaziz Al-Eid (IOC)
- Abdulwahhab Al-Safi (IOC)
- Mehdi Bahrololoum (IRI)
- Farough Dara (IRI)
- Hamid Reza Zareei (IRI)
- Masahito Toma (JPN)
- Nasser Zayid (OMA)
- Mohanad Al-Tahrawi (PLE)
- Sami Salim (PLE)
- Zamel Essa Al-Kuwari (QAT)
- Mohamed Al-Mazroai (QAT)
- Omar Akil (SYR)
- Mged Chlhoum (SYR)
- Pratan Mansiri (THA)
- Humaid Al-Balooshi (UAE)
- Ibrahim Al-Balooshi (UAE)
- Mohamed Bashir (UAE)
- Ali Kozad (UAE)
- Javlon Anorov (UZB)
- Đỗ Văn Nam (VIE)
- Nguyễn Xuân Huy (VIE)
- Amr Haidarah (YEM)
- Mamon Mohammed (YEM)

1 own goal

- Nasser Zayid (OMA) (against INA)
- Omar Al-Najjar (SYR) (against KUW)
- Auttapon Saetiaw (THA) (against JPN)
