= Jalal Al-Sinani =

Omani footballer (born 1986)

Personal information
- Full name: Jalal Khamis Rabia Al-Sinani
- Date of birth: 17 November 1986 (age 39)
- Place of birth: Muscat, Oman
- Height: 1.77 m (5 ft 10 in)
- Position: Midfielder

Team information
- Current team: Quriyat

Youth career
- Quriyat

Senior career*
Years	Team	Apps	(Gls)
2010–	Quriyat	?	(?)

International career
2011–	Oman Beach Soccer	?	(?)
- * Club domestic league appearances and goals

Jalal Khamis Rabia Al-Sinani commonly known as Jalal Al-Sinani (Arabic: جلال خميس ربيعة السناني; born 17 November 1986) is an Omani footballer who plays for Quriyat Club in Oman Second Division League.

== International career ==
Jalal is part of the first team squad of the Oman national beach soccer team. He was selected for the national team for the first time in 2011.

=== Asian Beach Games ===
He has made appearances in the 2010 Asian Beach Games, the 2012 Asian Beach Games and the 2014 Asian Beach Games.

In the 2010 edition, which was played in his hometown Muscat, Oman, he scored a brace in a 7-2 win over Syria, another brace in a 6-4 win over Athletes from Kuwait and another brace in a 9-4 win over Indonesia thus helping his side to qualify for the quarter-finals and taking his goals tally to 6 goals. Oman finished as the runners-up of the tournament as they lost on penalty shootout to the United Arab Emirates after the match had ended 2-2 after extra time.

In the 2012 Asian Beach Games held in Haiyang, China, he scored two goals, one in a 5-1 win over Iraq and another in a 4-3 loss against Palestine in the quarter-finals of the 2012 edition.

In the 2014 Asian Beach Games held in Phuket, Thailand, he scored 4 goals, one in a 5-1 win over Iran national beach soccer team and a hat trick in a 4-4 draw against China which Oman eventually won 3-2 on penalties and secured the 5th position in the tournament.

=== AFC Beach Soccer Championship ===
He has made appearances in the 2011 AFC Beach Soccer Championship and the 2013 AFC Beach Soccer Championship.

In the 2011 edition, which was played in his hometown Muscat, Oman, he scored 5 goals, a brace in an 8-6 victory over Kuwait, a brace in a 5-2 win over Syria in the Semi-finals and another goal in a 2-2 draw against Iran national beach soccer team which Oman eventually won 1-0 on penalties as Jalal converted from the spot for the home side. Oman secured the runners-up place in the tournament in the tournament as they lost 1-2 against Asian heavy weights and defending champions Japan.

In the 2013 edition which was held in Doha, Qatar, he scored 4 goals, one in a 7-0 win over Afghanistan and a hat-trick in a 6-3 win over Palestine in the fifth place final match.

=== FIFA Beach Soccer World Cup ===
He made 3 appearances and has scored 3 goals in the 2011 FIFA Beach Soccer World Cup.

He scored his first FIFA Beach Soccer World Cup goal on 1 September 2011 in a 3-1 loss against Argentina in the opening match of Group B in the tournament. This was Oman's first ever World Cup goal as he scored in front of a crowd of 3,000 at the Stadio del Mare, Ravenna, Italy. He then scored a brace in another group match in a 3-4 loss against El Salvador.
