= 2013 AFC Beach Soccer Championship =

2013 FIFA Beach Soccer World Cup Qualification (AFC)
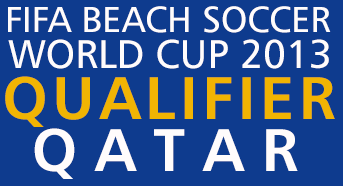

Tournament details
- Host country: Qatar
- Dates: 22–26 January
- Teams: 16 (from 1 confederation)
- Venue: 2 (in 1 host city)

Final positions
- Champions: Iran (1st title)
- Runners-up: Japan
- Third place: United Arab Emirates
- Fourth place: Australia

Tournament statistics
- Matches played: 40
- Goals scored: 325 (8.13 per match)
- Top scorer: (Iran) Moslem Mesigar (11 goals)
- Best player: (Japan) Ozu (Osmar Moreira)
- Best goalkeeper: (Australia) Simon Jaeger

The 2013 AFC Beach Soccer Championship was a continental beach soccer tournament which took place from 22 to 26 January 2013, at a temporary stadium and adjacent pitch on the Katara Beach in Doha, Qatar. The stadium had a capacity of 3,000 spectators.

The two finalists and the third place play-off winner earned qualification to represent Asia at the 2013 FIFA Beach Soccer World Cup in Papeete, Tahiti.

== Participating teams ==
Sixteen teams have been confirmed to be taking part in the tournament, a record number, surpassing that of the eleven teams that competed in the 2011 qualifiers. The first 13 participating teams are as follows:

- Afghanistan*
- Australia
- Bahrain
- China
- Iran
- Iraq
- Japan
- Lebanon
- Oman
- Philippines*
- Palestine
- Qatar
- Saudi Arabia
- Thailand*
- United Arab Emirates
- Uzbekistan

The organizers left three slots available and would announce who the three teams would be inside of two weeks after the draw. It was learned on 8 January 2013 that the Philippines have fielded a team to participate in the Asian qualifier. It was also learned that Afghanistan and Thailand will also participate. These newly-known entries have been indicated with a *.

== Group stage ==
The draw to divide the teams into the following four groups was conducted on December 20, 2012, in Doha, Qatar. The subsequent fixtures were determined on 10 January 2013.

All kickoff times are listed as Qatar local time (UTC+3).

Key to colours in group tables
Group winners advance to the semi-finals

=== Group A ===
Team	Pld	W	W+	L	GF	GA	GD	Pts
Australia	3	2	1	0	15	11	+4	8
Oman	3	2	0	1	14	7	+7	6
Afghanistan	3	1	0	2	11	16	−5	3
Qatar	3	0	0	3	7	13	−6	0

22 January 2013
17:45

Oman	4 – 6	Australia
Al-Oraimi; Al-Oraimi; Ishaq; Al-Balushi	Report

Pitch 1, Katara Beach, Doha

22 January 2013
20:15

Afghanistan	7 – 3	Qatar
	Report

Pitch 1, Katara Beach, Doha

23 January 2013
15:15

Oman	7 – 0	Afghanistan
Al-Oraimi; Al-Rajhi; Al-Dhabit; Ishaq; Al-Sinani; Al-Oraimi; Al-Busaidi	Report

Pitch 2, Katara Beach, Doha

23 January 2013
20:15

Qatar	3 – 3 (a.e.t.)	Australia
	Report
Penalties
Penalty scored Penalty missed	3 – 4	Penalty scored

Pitch 1, Katara Beach, Doha

24 January 2013
16:30

Australia	6 – 4	Afghanistan
	Report

Pitch 1, Katara Beach, Doha

24 January 2013
20:15

Qatar	1 – 3	Oman
	Report	Al-Dhabit; Al-Oraimi; Ishaq

Pitch 1, Katara Beach, Doha

=== Group B ===
Team	Pld	W	W+	L	GF	GA	GD	Pts
Japan	3	3	0	0	15	8	+7	9
Lebanon	3	2	0	1	16	13	+3	6
Bahrain	3	0	1	2	6	11	−5	2
Thailand	3	0	0	3	6	11	−5	0

22 January 2013
15:15

Bahrain	3 – 5	Lebanon
	Report

Pitch 2, Katara Beach, Doha

22 January 2013
19:00

Thailand	1 – 4	Japan
	Report

Pitch 1, Katara Beach, Doha

23 January 2013
14:00

Bahrain	1 – 1 (a.e.t.)	Thailand
	Report
Penalties
Penalty scored	1 – 0	Penalty missed

Pitch 1, Katara Beach, Doha

23 January 2013
17:45

Japan	6 – 5	Lebanon
	Report

Pitch 1, Katara Beach, Doha

24 January 2013
14:00

Lebanon	6 – 4	Thailand
	Report

Pitch 1, Katara Beach, Doha

24 January 2013
17:45

Japan	5 – 2	Bahrain
	Report

Pitch 1, Katara Beach, Doha

=== Group C ===
Team	Pld	W	W+	L	GF	GA	GD	Pts
United Arab Emirates	3	3	0	0	18	6	+12	9
Palestine	3	1	1	1	16	12	+4	5
Saudi Arabia	3	1	0	2	13	20	−7	3
Uzbekistan	3	0	0	3	12	21	−9	0

22 January 2013
14:00

Saudi Arabia	3 – 6	United Arab Emirates
	Report

Pitch 1, Katara Beach, Doha

22 January 2013
14:00

Uzbekistan	5 – 6 (a.e.t.)	Palestine
	Report

Pitch 2, Katara Beach, Doha

23 January 2013
15:15

United Arab Emirates	5 – 2	Palestine
	Report

Pitch 1, Katara Beach, Doha

23 January 2013
16:30

Uzbekistan	6 – 8	Saudi Arabia
	Report

Pitch 1, Katara Beach, Doha

24 January 2013
15:15

Palestine	8 – 2	Saudi Arabia
	Report

Pitch 1, Katara Beach, Doha

24 January 2013
15:15

United Arab Emirates	7 – 1	Uzbekistan
	Report

Pitch 2, Katara Beach, Doha

=== Group D ===
Team	Pld	W	W+	L	GF	GA	GD	Pts
Iran	3	3	0	0	34	5	+29	9
China	3	2	0	1	21	8	+13	6
Iraq	3	1	0	2	12	18	−6	3
Philippines	3	0	0	3	1	37	−36	0

22 January 2013
15:15

Philippines	0 – 20	Iran
	Report

Pitch 1, Katara Beach, Doha

22 January 2013
16:30

China	8 – 3	Iraq
	Report

Pitch 1, Katara Beach, Doha

23 January 2013
14:00

Iran	10 – 3	Iraq
	Report

Pitch 2, Katara Beach, Doha

23 January 2013
19:00

China	11 – 1	Philippines
	Report

Pitch 1, Katara Beach, Doha

24 January 2013
14:00

Iraq	6 – 0	Philippines
	Report

Pitch 2, Katara Beach, Doha

24 January 2013
19:00

Iran	4 – 2	China
	Report

Pitch 1, Katara Beach, Doha

== Playoff stage ==
After the group stage had concluded, a draw was held at 21:30 to determine the match-ups for all 16 teams, including the group winners, based on where the teams place.

=== 13th Place Playoff ===
Semi-finals
25 January 2013
Philippines	2
Uzbekistan	8
25 January 2013
Qatar	2
Thailand	5

Final
26 January 2013
Uzbekistan	3
Thailand	4
Third place
26 January 2013
Philippines	3
Qatar	8

==== Thirteenth place semifinals ====
25 January 2013
14:00

Philippines	2 – 8	Uzbekistan
	Report

Pitch 1, Katara Beach, Doha

25 January 2013
17:45

Qatar	2 – 5	Thailand
	Report

Pitch 1, Katara Beach, Doha

==== Fifteenth place final ====
26 January 2013
15:15

Philippines	3 – 8	Qatar
	Report

Pitch 1, Katara Beach, Doha

==== Thirteenth place final ====
26 January 2013
14:00

Uzbekistan	3 – 4	Thailand
	Report

Pitch 2, Katara Beach, Doha

=== 9th Place Playoff ===
Semi-finals
25 January 2013
Iraq	3
Saudi Arabia	0
25 January 2013
Afghanistan	2
Bahrain	5

Final
26 January 2013
Iraq	1
Bahrain	2
Third place
26 January 2013
Saudi Arabia	0
Afghanistan	3

==== Ninth place semifinals ====
25 January 2013
14:00

Iraq	3 – 0	Saudi Arabia
	Report

Pitch 2, Katara Beach, Doha

25 January 2013
15:15

Afghanistan	2 – 5	Bahrain
	Report

Pitch 1, Katara Beach, Doha

==== Eleventh place final ====
26 January 2013
15:15

Saudi Arabia	0 – 3	Afghanistan
	Report

Pitch 2, Katara Beach, Doha

==== Ninth place final ====
26 January 2013
14:00

Iraq	1 – 2	Bahrain
	Report

Pitch 1, Katara Beach, Doha

=== 5th Place Playoff ===
Semi-finals
25 January 2013
China	2
Palestine	5
25 January 2013
Oman	1
Lebanon	0

Final
26 January 2013
Palestine	3
Oman	6
Third place
26 January 2013
China	10
Lebanon	5

==== Fifth place semifinals ====
25 January 2013
15:15

China	2 – 5	Palestine
	Report

Pitch 2, Katara Beach, Doha

25 January 2013
16:30

Oman	1 – 0	Lebanon
Al-Alawi 6'	Report

Pitch 1, Katara Beach, Doha

==== Seventh place final ====
26 January 2013
15:15

China	10 – 5	Lebanon
	Report

Pitch 2, Katara Beach, Doha

==== Fifth place final ====
26 January 2013
16:30

Palestine	3 – 6	Oman
	Report	Al-Sinani; Al-Oraimi; Al-Oraimi; Al-Rajhi; Al-Sinani; Al-Sinani

Pitch 1, Katara Beach, Doha

=== Championship playoff ===
Semi-finals
25 January 2013
Iran	3
United Arab Emirates	2
25 January 2013
Australia	1
Japan	2

Final
26 January 2013
Iran (a.e.t.)	6 (5)
Japan	6 (4)
Third place
26 January 2013
United Arab Emirates	3
Australia	2

==== Semifinals ====
25 January 2013
19:00

Iran	3 – 2	United Arab Emirates
	Report

Pitch 1, Katara Beach, Doha

25 January 2013
20:15

Australia	1 – 2	Japan
	Report

Pitch 1, Katara Beach, Doha

==== Third place play off ====
26 January 2013
17:45

United Arab Emirates	3 – 2	Australia
	Report

Pitch 1, Katara Beach, Doha

==== Final ====
26 January 2013
20:15

Iran	6 – 6 (a.e.t.)	Japan
	Report
Penalties
Penalty scored	5 – 4	Penalty scored Penalty missed

Pitch 1, Katara Beach, Doha

== Champion ==
2013 AFC Beach Soccer Championship winners
Iran
1st title
Seyed Peyman Hosseini, Mohammad Reza Hajipour, Mahadi Hassan Inozari, Ali Naderi, Hassan Abdollah Imobarhan, Mehran Morshedizadeh, Farid Bolokbashi, Mohammad Ahmadzadeh, Moslem Mesigar, Mohammad Ali Mokhtari, Mostafa Kiani, Amir Hossein Akbari
Coach: (Brazil) Marco Octavio

== Awards ==
Best Player (MVP)
(Japan) Ozu (Osmar Moreira)
Top Scorer(s)
(Iran) Moslem Mesigar
(11 goals)
Best Goalkeeper
(Australia) Simon Jaeger

== Final standings ==
Rank	Team
1	Iran
2	Japan
3	United Arab Emirates
4	Australia
5	Oman
6	Palestine
7	China
8	Lebanon
9	Bahrain
10	Iraq
11	Afghanistan
12	Saudi Arabia
13	Thailand
14	Uzbekistan
15	Qatar
16	Philippines
