= Uzbekistan national beach soccer team =

National sports team

Uzbekistan
- Association: Uzbekistan Football Federation
- Confederation: AFC (Asia)
- Head coach: Akhadjon Yusupov
- FIFA code: UZB
- BSWW ranking: 88 ▼1 (2 September 2026)
First colours
Second colours

First international
- Uzbekistan 2–6 United Arab Emirates (Dubai, United Arab Emirates; 6 May 2008)

Biggest win
- Uzbekistan 9–2 Timor-Leste (Bali, Indonesia; 21 October 2008)

Biggest defeat
- Russia 15–0 Uzbekistan (Minsk, Belarus; 6 August 2023)

The Uzbekistan national beach soccer team represents Uzbekistan in international beach soccer competitions and is controlled by the UFF, the governing body for football in Uzbekistan.

== Current squad ==
The following players were called up for 2015 AFC Beach Soccer Championship in Qatar from 23 to 28 March 2015.

As of 22 March 2015

Note: Flags indicate national team as defined under FIFA eligibility rules; some limited exceptions apply. Players may hold more than one non-FIFA nationality.

No.	Pos.	Nation	Player
1	GK		Ganisher Kholmurodov
2			Farkhod Mirakhmedov
3			Tokhir Abdurazzakov
6			Sarvar Shaakhmedov
7			Feruz Fakhriddinov

No.	Pos.	Nation	Player
9			Sarvar Kholmurodov
10			Jamoliddin Sharipov
12	GK		Khazratkulov
11	FW		Jafar Irismetov
13	FP		Farkhod Jumaev

== Tournament Records ==
=== AFC Beach Soccer Championship ===
Asian Championship record
Year	Round	Pld	W	WE	WP	L	GS	GA	DIF	Pts
(United Arab Emirates) 2006	did not enter	–	–	–	–	–	–	–	–	–
(United Arab Emirates) 2007	did not enter	–	–	–	–	–	–	–	–	–
(United Arab Emirates) 2008	5th place	2	0	0	0	2	5	10	-5	0
(United Arab Emirates) 2009	6th place	2	0	0	0	2	4	7	-3	0
(Oman) 2011	7th place	4	1	0	0	3	14	14	0	3
(Qatar) 2013	14th place	5	1	0	0	4	23	27	-4	3
(Qatar) 2015	8th place	5	2	0	0	3	18	19	-1	6
(United Arab Emirates) 2017	Withdrew	–	–	–	–	–	–	–	–	–
(Thailand) 2019	did not enter	–	–	–	–	–	–	–	–	–
(Thailand) 2023	Group stage	3	1	0	0	2	8	17	-9	3
(Thailand) 2025	did not enter	–	–	–	–	–	–	–	–	–
(Thailand) 2026	tbc	–	–	–	–	–	–	–	–	–
Total	7/12	21	5	0	0	16	72	94	-22	15

Note: Win in Common Time W = 3 Points / Win in Extra Time WE = 2 Points / Win in Penalty shoot-out WP = 1 Point / Lose L = 0 Points

=== Asian Beach Games ===
Asian Beach Games record
Year	Round	Pld	W	WE	WP	L	GS	GA	Dif	Pts
(Indonesia) 2008	Quarterfinal	4	3	0	0	1	18	13	+5	9
(Oman) 2010	Round 1	3	1	0	0	2	12	12	0	3
(China) 2012	Did Not Enter	–	–	–	–	–	–	–	–	–
(Thailand) 2014	6th Place	5	2	0	0	3	17	24	-7	6
(Vietnam) 2016	Quarterfinal	2	0	0	1	1	7	12	-5	1
(China) 2026	Did Not Enter	–	–	–	–	–	–	–	–	–
Total	4/6	14	6	0	1	7	54	61	-7	19

== Results ==
p1 = Team 1 win on penalties, After extra time

p2 = Team 2 win on penalties, After extra time

x = After extra time

=== 2008 ===
1. 06/05/2008 Dubai (UAE) UAE 6-2 Uzbekistan FIFA World Cup 2008 Qualification
2. 07/05/2008 Dubai (UAE) China 4-3 Uzbekistan FIFA World Cup 2008 Qualification
3. 19/10/2008 Sanur (Indonesia) Uzbekistan 4-3 Qatar Asian beach Games 2008
4. 21/10/2008 Sanur (Indonesia) Uzbekistan 9-2 Timor-Leste Asian beach Games 2008
5. 23/10/2008 Sanur (Indonesia) Indonesia 1-4 Uzbekistan Asian beach Games 2008
6. 24/10/2008 Sanur (Indonesia) Oman 7-1 Uzbekistan Asian beach Games 2008

=== 2009 ===
1. 07/11/2009 Dubai (UAE) Bahrain 2-1 Uzbekistan FIFA World Cup 2009 Qualification
2. 08/11/2009 Dubai (UAE) Japan 5-3 Uzbekistan FIFA World Cup 2009 Qualification
3. 09/11/2009 Dubai (UAE) Uzbekistan 8-7 France Friendly Match 2009

=== 2010 ===
1. 09/12/2010 Muscat (Oman) Uzbekistan 5-3 Qatar Asian beach Games 2010
2. 11/12/2010 Muscat (Oman) Yemen 6-4 Uzbekistan Asian beach Games 2010
3. 13/12/2010 Muscat (Oman) UAE 3-3(p1) Uzbekistan Asian beach Games 2010

=== 2011 ===
1. 27/02/2011 Muscat (Oman) Bahrain 4-3 Uzbekistan FIFA World Cup 2011 Qualification
2. 28/02/2011 Muscat (Oman) UAE 2-1 Uzbekistan FIFA World Cup 2011 Qualification
3. 01/03/2011 Muscat (Oman) Uzbekistan 7-3 Indonesia FIFA World Cup 2011 Qualification
4. 02/03/2011 Muscat (Oman) Iran 5-3 Uzbekistan FIFA World Cup 2011 Qualification
5. 01/07/2011 Haiyang (China) China 5-3 Uzbekistan 3-Nation Tournament 2011
6. 02/07/2011 Haiyang (China) Japan 4-2 Uzbekistan 3-Nation Tournament 2011

=== 2013 ===
1. 22/01/2013 Doha (Qatar) Palestine 6-5 (x) Uzbekistan FIFA World Cup 2013 Qualification
2. 23/01/2013 Doha (Qatar) Saudi Arabia 8-6 Uzbekistan FIFA World Cup 2013 Qualification
3. 24/01/2013 Doha (Qatar) UAE 7-1 Uzbekistan FIFA World Cup 2013 Qualification
4. 25/01/2013 Doha (Qatar) Uzbekistan 8-2 Philippines FIFA World Cup 2013 Qualification
5. 26/01/2013 Doha (Qatar) Thailand 4-3 Uzbekistan FIFA World Cup 2013 Qualification

=== 2014 ===
1. 15/11/2014 Phuket (Thailand) China 4-2 Uzbekistan Asian beach Games 2014
2. 17/11/2014 Phuket (Thailand) Uzbekistan 4-3 Bahrain Asian beach Games 2014
3. 19/11/2014 Phuket (Thailand) UAE 6-4 Uzbekistan Asian beach Games 2014
4. 19/11/2014 Phuket (Thailand) Thailand 3-5 Uzbekistan Asian beach Games 2014
5. 19/11/2014 Phuket (Thailand) Oman 8-2 Uzbekistan Asian beach Games 2014

=== 2015 ===
1. 20/03/2015 Dubai (UAE) Azerbaijan 3-2 Uzbekistan Friendly Match 2015
2. 24/03/2015 Doha (Qatar) Uzbekistan 6-5 UAE FIFA World Cup 2015 Qualification
3. 25/03/2015 Doha (Qatar) Uzbekistan 6-1 Iraq FIFA World Cup 2015 Qualification
4. 26/03/2015 Doha (Qatar) Lebanon 6-1 Uzbekistan FIFA World Cup 2015 Qualification
5. 27/03/2015 Doha (Qatar) China 4-3 Uzbekistan FIFA World Cup 2015 Qualification
6. 28/03/2015 Doha (Qatar) Bahrain 3-2 (x) Uzbekistan FIFA World Cup 2015 Qualification

=== 2016 ===
1. 27/09/2016 Da Nang (Vietnam) UAE 3-3 (p2)Uzbekistan Asian Beach Games 2016
2. 29/09/2016 Da Nang (Vietnam) Afghanistan 9-4 Uzbekistan Asian Beach Games 2016

=== 2023 ===
1. 25/01/2023 Saint Petersburg Belarus 13-0 Uzbekistan Friendly
2. 26/01/2023 Saint Petersburg Belarus 10-2 Uzbekistan Friendly
3. 2023 AFC Beach Soccer Asian Cup UZB 0-4 UAE
4. 2023 AFC Beach Soccer Asian Cup UZB 2-11 IRI
5. 2023 AFC Beach Soccer Asian Cup UZB 6-2 MAS
6. 2023 CIS Games UZB 1-13 OMA
7. 2023 CIS Games UZB 0-15 RUS
8. 2023 CIS Games UZB 3-7 EGY
9. 2023 CIS Games UZB 2-3 AZE
10. 2023 CIS Games UZB 2-10 UAE

=== 2026 ===
1. 2026 AFC Beach Soccer Asian Cup UZB - OMA
2. 2026 AFC Beach Soccer Asian Cup UZB - UAE
3. 2026 AFC Beach Soccer Asian Cup UZB - KSA

=== Results (By Years) ===
As of 31 December 2025

Year	M	W	D	L	GF	GA	GD
2008	6	3	0	3	23	23	0
2009	3	1	0	2	12	14	-2
2010	3	1	1	1	12	12	0
2011	6	1	0	5	19	23	-4
2013	5	1	0	4	23	27	-4
2014	5	2	0	3	17	24	-7
2015	6	2	0	4	20	22	-2
2016	2	0	1	1	7	12	-5
2023	10	1	0	9	18	88	-70
2026	0	0	0	0	0	0	0
Total	46	12	2	32	151	245	-94
