= Peyman Hosseini =

Iranian beach soccer player (born 1984)

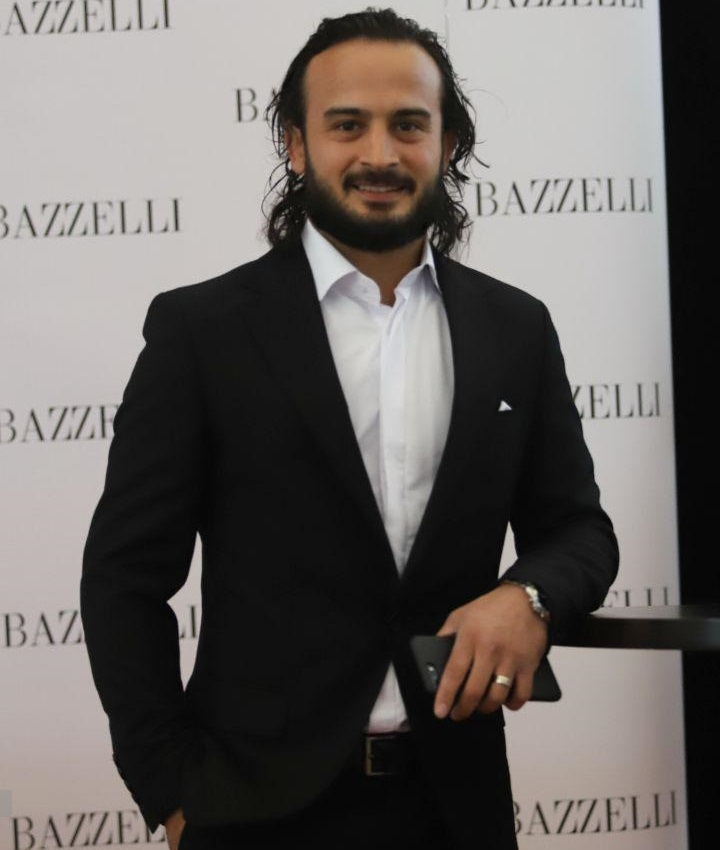
- Hosseini in 2019

Personal information
- Full name: Seyed Peyman Hosseini
- Date of birth: 16 February 1984 (age 42)
- Place of birth: Largan, Noshahr, Iran
- Height: 1.72 m (5 ft 8 in)
- Position: Goalkeeper

Team information
- Current team: Shahrdari Tabriz (beach soccer)
- Number: 1

Youth career
- 1996–2005: Shamoushak Noshahr

Senior career*
Years	Team	Apps	(Gls)
2005–2008	Shamoushak Noshahr		
2008–2010	Apadana		
2010–2011	Saipa (beach soccer)		
2011–2013	Shahrdari Tabriz (beach soccer)		
2015–2016	Pars Jonoubi Jam (beach soccer)		
2016–	Shahriar Sari (beach soccer)		

International career^{‡}
2011–	Iran (beach soccer)	87	(21)
Medal record
Representing Iran
Men's beach soccer
FIFA Beach Soccer World Cup
Bronze medal – third place	2017 Bahamas
Intercontinental Cup
Gold medal – first place	2013 Dubai
Gold medal – first place	2018 Dubai
Gold medal – first place	2019 Dubai
Asian Championship
Gold medal – first place	2013 Doha
Gold medal – first place	2017 Kuala Terengganu
Bronze medal – third place	2008 Dubai
Bronze medal – third place	2011 Muscat
Bronze medal – third place	2015 Doha
Asian Beach Games
Gold medal – first place	2012 Haiyang
Gold medal – first place	2014 Phuket
Bronze medal – third place	2010 Muscat
- * Club domestic league appearances and goals ‡ National team caps and goals as of 10 May 2017

Seyed Peyman Hosseini (born 16 February 1984) is an Iranian beach soccer player who plays for Shahriar Sari in the Iran Premier Beach Soccer League. He plays in the goalkeeper position. Hosseini has represented Iran at three FIFA Beach Soccer World Cups (2013, 2015, and 2017).

Hosseini is known as one of his generation's best beach soccer goalkeepers and was named the best goalkeeper in the 2017 FIFA Beach Soccer World Cup, in which Iran finished in third place, and also named the best goalkeeper in the world for the year 2017.

== Club career ==
=== Shamoushak ===
Hosseini started his career playing association football with the youth teams of Shamoushak Noshahr. He made his debut with the first team in 2005 in a match against Bargh Shiraz. After the age of 22 he switched to playing Beach soccer.

== International career ==
Hosseini joined the Iran national beach soccer team in 2011 and became the number one goalkeeper in 2012. He was named the best goalkeeper of the 2013 AFC Beach Soccer Championship. Hosseini was named the best goalkeeper of the 2017 FIFA Beach Soccer World Cup and helped Iran to a best-ever third-place finish.

== Honours ==
=== Beach soccer ===
- Iran
  - FIFA Beach Soccer World Cup Third place: 2017
  - Beach Soccer Intercontinental Cup winner: 2013
  - Asian Championship winner : 2013, 2017 Third place: 2015, 2011, 2008
  - Asian Beach Games winner: 2012, 2014 Third place: 2010

==== Individual ====
- Best goalkeeper of the year: 2017
- Best goalkeeper: 2017 FIFA Beach Soccer World Cup
- Goal of the Tournament: 2017 FIFA Beach Soccer World Cup
- Best goalkeeper: 2015 AFC Beach Soccer Championship
