= Bernardo Martins =

Portuguese footballer (born 1997)

Personal information
- Full name: Bernardo Sousa Pereira Brites Martins
- Date of birth: 4 December 1997 (age 28)
- Place of birth: Porto, Portugal
- Height: 1.76 m (5 ft 9 in)
- Positions: Attacking midfielder; winger

Team information
- Current team: A.E. Kifisia
- Number: 8

Youth career
- 2006–2011: Porto
- 2011–2015: Foz
- 2013–2014: → Rio Ave (loan)
- 2015–2016: Leixões

Senior career*
Years	Team	Apps	(Gls)
2016–2019	Leixões	16	(1)
2017	→ Pedras Rubras (loan)	7	(0)
2017–2018	→ Trofense (loan)	24	(3)
2019	Benfica B	12	(1)
2019–2021	Paços Ferreira	5	(0)
2020	→ Chaves (loan)	5	(0)
2021	→ Covilhã (loan)	13	(0)
2021–2023	Vilafranquense	48	(4)
2023–2024	AVS	31	(4)
2024–2026	Moreirense	45	(5)
2026–	A.E. Kifisia	22	(2)
- * Club domestic league appearances and goals as of 19 September 2026

Bernardo Sousa Pereira Brites Martins (born 4 December 1997), known as Benny, is a Portuguese professional footballer who plays as an attacking midfielder or winger for Super League Greece club A.E. Kifisia.

== Club career ==
Born in Porto, Martins made his professional debut with Leixões on 14 August 2016 as an 18th-minute substitute in a LigaPro 1–0 away loss to Cova da Piedade.

On 26 January 2019, Martins joined LigaPro side Benfica B along with Leixões teammate Pedro Henrique. Months later, he moved to Paços de Ferreira in Primeira Liga on a three-year contract.

On 2 February 2026, Benny signed with Greek club A.E. Kifisia.

== Career statistics ==
=== Club ===
As of 2 February 2026

Appearances and goals by club, season and competition
Club	Season	League			National cup (Note: Includes Taça de Portugal)		Continental		Other		Total	
Club	Season	Division	Apps	Goals	Apps	Goals	Apps	Goals	Apps	Goals	Apps	Goals
Leixões	2016–17	Liga Portugal 2	1	0	0	0	–		–		1	0
Leixões	2018–19	Liga Portugal 2	15	1	3	0	–		1 (Note: Appearance(s) in Taça da Liga)	0	19	1
Leixões	Total		16	1	3	0	0	0	1	0	20	1
Benfica B	2018–19	Liga Portugal 2	12	1	0	0	–		–		12	1
Paços Ferreira	2019–20	Primeira Liga	5	0	2	0	–		2	0	9	0
Chaves (loan)	2019–20	Liga Portugal 2	5	0	0	0	–		–		5	0
Covilhã (loan)	2020–21	Liga Portugal 2	13	0	0	0	–		–		13	0
Vilafranquense	2021–22	Liga Portugal 2	16	1	2	0	–		1	0	19	1
Vilafranquense	2022–23	Liga Portugal 2	31	3	2	0	–		3	0	36	3
Vilafranquense	Total		47	4	4	0	0	0	4	0	55	4
AVS	2023–24	Liga Portugal 2	31	4	2	0	–		6 (Note: 4 appearances in Taça da Liga, 2 appearances and 2 goals in Primeira Liga Relegation Playoffs)	2	39	6
Moreirense	2024–25	Primeira Liga	31	4	3	1	–		1	0	35	5
Moreirense	2025–26	Primeira Liga	14	1	1	0	–		–		15	1
Moreirense	Total		45	5	4	1	0	0	1	0	50	6
A.E. Kifisia	2025–26	Super League Greece	0	0	0	0	–		0	0	0	0
Career total			174	15	15	1	0	0	14	2	203	18

== Honours ==
Individual

- Primeira Liga Goal of the Month: March 2025
- Liga Portugal 2 Player of the Month: August 2023
- Liga Portugal 2 Midfielder of the Month: August 2023, September 2023
