= Australia men's national beach soccer team =

Australia
- Nickname: Beach Socceroos
- Association: Football Australia
- Confederation: AFC (Asia)
- Sub-confederation: AFF (South-East Asia)
- FIFA code: AUS
- BSWW ranking: NR (6 May 2026)
First colours
Second colours

The Australia national beach soccer team represents Australia in international men's beach soccer. The team is controlled by the governing body for association football in Australia, Football Australia, which is currently a member of the Asian Football Confederation (AFC) and the regional ASEAN Football Federation (AFF) since leaving the Oceania Football Confederation (OFC) in 2006. The team's official nickname is the Beach Socceroos.

The team has represented Australia at the FIFA Beach Soccer World Cup tournaments on one occasion, in 2005.

== Competitive record ==
=== FIFA Beach Soccer World Cup ===
FIFA Beach Soccer World Cup record
Year	Result	Position	Pld	W	D	L	GF	GA
(Brazil) 2005	Group stage	9th	2	0	0	2	2	8
(Brazil) 2006	did not qualify							
(Brazil) 2007	did not qualify							
(France) 2008	did not qualify							
(United Arab Emirates) 2009	did not qualify							
(Italy) 2011	did not qualify							
(French Polynesia) 2013	did not qualify							
(Portugal) 2015	did not qualify							
(The Bahamas) 2017	did not qualify							
(Paraguay) 2019	did not qualify							
(Russia) 2021	did not qualify							
(United Arab Emirates) 2023	to be determined							
(Seychelles) 2025	to be determined							
Total	1/12	0 Titles	2	0	0	2	2	8

=== AFC Beach Soccer Championship ===
AFC Beach Soccer Championship record
Year	Result	Position	Pld	W	D	L	GF	GA
(United Arab Emirates) 2006	did not enter							
(United Arab Emirates) 2007	did not enter							
(United Arab Emirates) 2008	did not enter							
(United Arab Emirates) 2009	Group stage	5th	3	1	0	2	7	8
(Oman) 2011	did not enter							
(Qatar) 2013	Third place play-off	4th	5	2	1	2	18	16
(Qatar) 2015	did not enter							
(Malaysia) 2017	did not enter							
(Thailand) 2019	did not enter							
Total	2/9	0 Titles	8	3	1	4	25	24

== Honours ==
- AFC Beach Soccer Championship

Fourth place (1): 2013
