= Zamel Essa Al-Kuwari =

Qatari footballer (born 1973)

Personal information
- Date of birth: 23 August 1973 (age 53)

International career
Years	Team	Apps	(Gls)
- Qatar

Zamel Essa Al-Kuwari (born 23 August 1973) is a Qatari footballer. He competed in the men's tournament at the 1992 Summer Olympics.
