= 2009 AFC Beach Soccer Championship =

Tournament details
- Host country: United Arab Emirates
- City: Dubai
- Dates: 7–11 November
- Teams: 7
- Venue: (in 1 host city)

Final positions
- Champions: Japan
- Runners-up: Bahrain
- Third place: Oman
- Fourth place: Iran

Tournament statistics
- Matches played: 13
- Goals scored: 73 (5.62 per match)

The 2009 AFC Beach Soccer Championship was a qualifying tournament held during 7–11 November 2009 in Dubai, United Arab Emirates that determined which two participants would represent the AFC region at the 2009 FIFA Beach Soccer World Cup.

== Participating teams ==
- Australia
- Bahrain
- China
- Iran
- Japan
- Oman
- Uzbekistan

== Format ==
The seven nation tournament consisted of two groups. The teams played each other once in their group during the group stage. The top two teams in each group advanced to the semifinals. The semifinal winners qualified for the 2009 FIFA Beach Soccer World Cup.

== Group stage ==
=== Group A ===
Team	Pld	W	D	L	GF	GA	GD	Pts
Bahrain	2	2	0	0	4	3	+1	5
Japan	2	1	0	1	7	5	+2	3
Uzbekistan	2	0	0	2	4	7	−3	0

7 November 2009

Bahrain	2 – 1	Uzbekistan

Hamdan Bin Mohammed Beach Sports Stadium, Dubai

8 November 2009

Japan	5 – 3	Uzbekistan

Hamdan Bin Mohammed Beach Sports Stadium, Dubai

9 November 2009

Japan	2 – 2	Bahrain
Penalties
	2 – 3

Hamdan Bin Mohammed Beach Sports Stadium, Dubai

=== Group B ===
Team	Pld	W	D	L	GF	GA	GD	Pts
Iran	3	3	0	0	16	6	+10	9
Oman	3	2	0	1	9	8	+1	6
Australia	3	1	0	2	7	8	−1	3
China	3	0	0	3	4	14	−10	0

7 November 2009

China	1 – 2	Oman

Hamdan Bin Mohammed Beach Sports Stadium, Dubai

7 November 2009

Australia	1 – 3	Iran

Hamdan Bin Mohammed Beach Sports Stadium, Dubai

8 November 2009

Iran	5 – 3	Oman

Hamdan Bin Mohammed Beach Sports Stadium, Dubai

8 November 2009

China	1 – 4	Australia

Hamdan Bin Mohammed Beach Sports Stadium, Dubai

9 November 2009

Oman	4 – 2	Australia

Hamdan Bin Mohammed Beach Sports Stadium, Dubai

9 November 2009

Iran	8 – 2	China

Hamdan Bin Mohammed Beach Sports Stadium, Dubai

== Knockout stage ==
Semi-finals
A1	Bahrain	6
B2	Oman	1
B1	Iran	3
A2	Japan	5

Final
SF1	Bahrain	2
SF2	Japan	4
3rd/4th Place match
SF1	Oman	1(2)
SF2	Iran	1(1)

1–1 aet
(2–1) pen

== Winners ==
2009 AFC Beach Soccer winners

Japan
First title

== Qualified Teams ==
- Bahrain
- Japan

== Final standing ==
Rank	Team
1	Japan
2	Bahrain
3	Oman
4	Iran
5	Australia
6	Uzbekistan
7	China
