= Abdiel Villa =

Mexican footballer (born 1983)

Abdiel Villa Aguirre (born March 16, 1983) is a Mexican former professional footballer who played as a midfielder.
