= Syria national beach soccer team =

Syria
- Association: Syrian Football Association
- Confederation: AFC (Asia)
- FIFA code: SYR
First colours
Second colours

The Syria National Beach Soccer Team represents Syria in international beach soccer competitions and is controlled by the Syrian Football Association, the governing body for football in the Syria.

== Achievements ==
- FIFA Beach Soccer World Cup qualification (AFC) Best: Eighth place
  - 2011
- Asian Beach Games Best: Sixth place
  - 2010
