= Takeshi Kawaharazuka =

Japanese footballer

Takeshi Kawaharazuka 河原塚 毅
Personal information
- Full name: Takeshi Kawaharazuka
- Date of birth: February 1, 1975 (age 51)
- Place of birth: Saitama, Japan
- Height: 1.74 m (5 ft 8 1/2 in)
- Position: Forward

Youth career
- 1990–1992: Ageo Minami High School

Senior career*
Years	Team	Apps	(Gls)
1999	Albirex Niigata	3	(0)
2002	Okinawa Kariyushi FC		

International career
2005–2013	Japan Beach Soccer		
- * Club domestic league appearances and goals

Takeshi Kawaharazuka (河原塚 毅, Kawaharazuka Takeshi; born February 1, 1975) is a former Japanese football player.

== Football career ==
Kawaharazuka was born in Saitama Prefecture on February 1, 1975. After graduating from high school, he played for newly was promoted to J2 League club, Albirex Niigata in 1999. However he could hardly play in the match and left the club end of 1999 season. He also played for Regional Leagues club Okinawa Kariyushi FC in 2002.

== Beach Soccer career ==
Kawaharazuka was selected Japan national beach soccer team for 2005, 2006, 2008, 2009, 2011 and 2013 FIFA Beach Soccer World Cup.
