= Moslem Mesigar =

Iranian beach soccer player

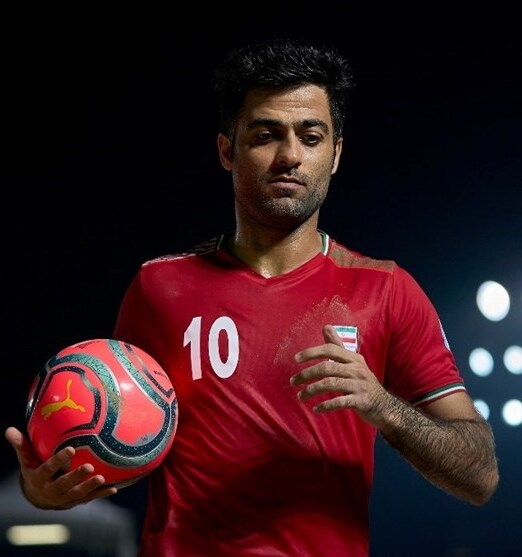
- Mesigar in 2023

Personal information
- Full name: Moslem Mesigar
- Date of birth: 17 September 1984 (age 42)
- Place of birth: Bushehr, Iran
- Position: Forward

Team information
- Current team: Darya Navardan Bushehr
- Number: 10

Senior career*
Years	Team	Apps	(Gls)
- Darya Navardan Bushehr

International career
	Iran (beach soccer)	51	(49)
- * Club domestic league appearances and goals

Moslem Mesigar (Persian: مسلم مسیگر; born 17 September 1984) is an Iranian beach soccer player who plays as a forward for Darya Navardan Bushehr. He is one of the most titled beach soccer player in the history and is the current captain of the Iran beach soccer team.

== Honours ==
=== Beach soccer ===
- Iran
  - FIFA Beach Soccer World Cup Third place: 2017
  - Beach Soccer Intercontinental Cup winner: 2013
  - Asian Championship winner : 2013, 2017 Third place: 2011, 2008
  - Asian Beach Games winner: 2012, Third place: 2010

==== Individual ====
  - Top Scorer: 2013 AFC Beach Soccer Championship
