= Mohammad Ahmadzadeh (beach soccer) =

Iranian beach soccer player

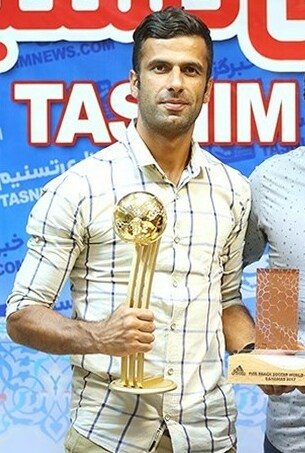
- Ahmadzadeh in 2017.

Personal information
- Full name: Mohammad Ahmadzadeh
- Date of birth: 25 November 1986 (age 39)
- Place of birth: Rudsar, Iran
- Position: Forward

International career
Years	Team	Apps	(Gls)
- Iran (beach soccer)

Mohammad Ahmadzadeh (born November 25, 1986 in Rudsar, Iran) is an Iranian beach Soccer player and former captain of the Iran national team.

== Personal life ==
On 24 January 2026, Ahmadzadeh mourned the death of Mohammad Hajipour, the national team's former goalkeeper who was killed in the 2025–2026 Iranian protests, by posting a picture of Hajipour and stating: "Have you ever seen the sky cry, but it doesn't rain? I'm in this state." Ahmadzadeh had previously been removed from the national team for supporting the Mahsa Amini protests by refusing to sing "Mehr-e Khavaran", the national anthem of the Islamic Republic of Iran, before a match.

== Honours ==
Beach Soccer

Iran

- FIFA Beach Soccer World Cup Third place: 2017
- Beach Soccer Intercontinental Cup winner: 2013
- Asian Championship winner : 2013, 2017 Third place: 2011, 2008
- Asian Beach Games winner: 2012, Third place: 2010

Individual

- Golden Ball, Best Beach Soccer player of the year 2017
