= Oman national beach soccer team =

National sports team

Oman سلطنة عُمان
- Association: Oman Football Association
- Confederation: AFC (Asia)
- Head coach: Talib Al Thanawi
- Captain: Hani Al Dhabit
- Home stadium: Al-Musannah Sports City, Muscat
- FIFA code: OMA
- BSWW ranking: 10 ▲2 (2 September 2026)
First colours
Second colours

Biggest win
- Oman 16–1 Algeria (Agadir, Morocco; 13 July 2019)

Biggest defeat
- Brazil 11–1 Oman (Victoria, Seychelles; 6 May 2025)

World Cup
- Appearances: 6 (first in 2011)
- Best result: 9th place (2015)

AFC Beach Soccer Asian Cup
- Appearances: 5 (first in 2009)
- Best result: Champions (2015)

Asian Beach Games
- Appearances: 5 (first in 2008)
- Best result: Champions (2008)

The Oman national beach soccer team represents Oman in international beach soccer competitions and is controlled by the Oman Football Association, the governing body for football in Oman.

== Results and fixtures ==
The following is a list of match results in the last 12 months, as well as any future matches that have been scheduled.

Legend

Win Draw Lose Fixture

== Coaching staff ==
=== Current coaching staff ===
Coach: Talib Al Thanawi

=== Manager history ===
- Talib Al Thanawi

== Players ==
=== Current squad ===
The following players and staff members were called up for the 2021 FIFA Beach Soccer World Cup.

Note: Flags indicate national team as defined under FIFA eligibility rules; some limited exceptions apply. Players may hold more than one non-FIFA nationality.

No.	Pos.	Nation	Player
1	GK	OMA	Said Ali Saleh Al Faris
2	FW	OMA	Abdullah Masoud Salim Al Sauti
3	MF	OMA	Jalal Khamis Rabee'a Al Sinani
4	MF	OMA	Yahya Mabyoua Nashir Al Araimi
5	DF	OMA	Mandhar Hilal Hamed Al Araimi
6	DF	OMA	Mushel Hilal Hamed Al Araimi
7	MF	OMA	Eid Abdullah Eid Sangoor Al Farsi

No.	Pos.	Nation	Player
8	MF	OMA	Nooh Salim Abdullah Al Zadjali
9	FW	OMA	Hamood Nasser Said Al Tooqi
10	FW	OMA	Khalid Khamis Mohammed Al Oraimi
11	FW	OMA	Salim Mohammed Salim Al Oraimi
12	GK	OMA	Younis Khamis Ali Khamis Al Owaisi
13	GK	OMA	Amjad Abdallah Khamis Zayid Al Hamdani
14	MF	OMA	Ahmed Mashal Khamis Al Mashrafi

Head coach: Talib Hilal Mohammed Al Thanawi
Goalkeeping coach: Yusuf Abeid Khatibu

== Competitive record ==
=== FIFA Beach Soccer World Cup ===
FIFA World Cup record										Qualification (AFC) record								
Year	Round	Pos	Pld	W	W+	L	GF	GA	GD	Round	Pos	Pld	W	W+	L	GF	GA	GD
(Brazil) 2005	Not invited									No qualification matches								
(Brazil) 2006	did not qualify									did not enter								
(Brazil) 2007	did not qualify									did not enter								
(France) 2008	did not qualify									did not enter								
(United Arab Emirates) 2009	did not qualify									Third place	3rd	5	2	1	2	11	15	–4
(Italy) 2011	Group stage	15th	3	0	0	3	7	15	–8	Runners-up	2nd	6	4	1	1	28	15	+13
(French Polynesia) 2013	did not qualify									5th place	5th	5	4	0	1	22	14	+8
(Portugal) 2015	Group stage	9th	3	1	0	2	11	11	0	Champions	1st	6	4	2	0	32	12	+20
(The Bahamas) 2017	did not qualify									Group stage	7th	2	1	0	1	6	6	0
(Paraguay) 2019	Group stage	12th	3	1	0	2	9	16	–7	Third place	3rd	5	3	1	1	19	14	+5
(Russia) 2021	Group stage	13th	3	1	0	2	8	11	–3	Cancelled (Note: The Asian qualifiers were originally due to take place in Thailand from 18–28 March 2021. Due to the COVID-19 pandemic, they were initially postponed to between 28 April and 8 May, and were subsequently cancelled entirely in January 2021. In place of the qualifiers, the AFC handpicked their three representatives to go to the World Cup on 21 April, choosing the best performing nations over the course of the previous three editions of the AFC Beach Soccer Championship.)								
(United Arab Emirates) 2024	Group stage	9th	3	1	0	2	10	10	0	Third place	3rd	6	5	0	2	35	10	+6
(Seychelles) 2025	Group stage	12th	3	0	1	0	9	22	–13	-	6	5	0	0	0	28	9	+19
Total	0 titles	6/13	18	4	1	13	54	85	–31	1 title	7/10	35	23	5	8	153	86	+48
