= 2022 WAFF Beach Soccer Championship =

International beach football competition

بطولة اتحاد غرب آسيا لكرة القدم الشاطئية السعودية 2022

Tournament details
- Host country: Saudi Arabia
- City: Jazan
- Dates: 18–23 May 2022
- Teams: 7 (from 1 sub-confederation)
- Venue: 1 (in 1 host city)

Final positions
- Champions: United Arab Emirates (1st title)
- Runners-up: Oman
- Third place: Bahrain
- Fourth place: Palestine

Tournament statistics
- Matches played: 16
- Goals scored: 104 (6.5 per match)
- Top scorer(s): (United Arab Emirates) Rashed Yaqoub (6 goals)
- Best player: (Oman) Younis Al Owaisi
- Best goalkeeper: (United Arab Emirates) Waleed Salem

The 2022 WAFF Beach Soccer Championship was the 2nd edition of the WAFF Beach Soccer Championship, the international beach soccer championship contested by men's national teams of the member associations of WAFF. The tournament was held in Jazan, Saudi Arabia. Initially, the competition was scheduled from May 16 to 21, 2022, but it was postponed by two days due to the death of Sheikh Khalifa bin Zayed Al Nahyan. as Saudi Arabia observed a three-day suspension of sports activities in Saudi Arabia as a mark of respect.

Iran won the previous edition in 2013 and would have been the defending champions. However, Iran has since left WAFF to join CAFA. The tournament was won by the United Arab Emirates, who secured their first WAFF Beach Soccer Championship title by defeating Oman in the final who finished as runners-up for the second consecutive time.

== Participation ==
=== Teams ===
Out of 12 member associations, 7 entered the final tournament. with Host Saudi Arabia, Kuwait and the United Arab Emirates making their debut in the competition.

Team	App	Last	Best performance
Bahrain	2nd	2013	Fourth Place (2013)
Kuwait	1st	Debut	
Lebanon	2nd	2013	Group Stage (2013)
Oman	2nd	2013	Runners-up (2013)
Saudi Arabia	1st	Debut	
Palestine	2nd	2013	Third Place (2013)
United Arab Emirates	1st	Debut	

Did not enter

- Iraq
- Jordan
- Qatar
- Syria
- Yemen

=== Draw ===
The draw to divide the 7 teams into two groups took place at 16:00 SAST (UTC+3) on April 26, 2022, and was virtually streamed on the West Asian Football Federation's YouTube channel.

The draw resulted in the following groups:

Group A
Pos	Team
A1	United Arab Emirates
A2	Kuwait
A3	Lebanon
A4	Oman

Group B
Pos	Team
B1	Saudi Arabia
B2	Bahrain
B3	Palestine

== Group stage ==
The match schedule was released on April 26th, after the draw was conducted.

All times are local, SAST (UTC+3).

=== Group A ===
Pos	Team	Pld	W	W+	WP	L	GF	GA	GD	Pts	Qualification
1	Oman	3	2	0	0	1	10	7	+3	6	Knockout stage
2	United Arab Emirates	3	2	0	0	1	9	9	0	6	Knockout stage
3	Lebanon	3	1	0	0	2	12	12	0	3	5th–7th places
4	Kuwait	3	0	0	1	2	6	9	−3	1	5th–7th places

Source: WAFF
Rules for classification: Tiebreakers
18 May 2022
17:00

Oman	4–2	United Arab Emirates
S. Al Bulushi 6', 34'; K. Al-Oraimi 15'; A. Al Sauti 35'	Report (WAFF)	Pooladi 17'; A. Abbas 24'

Jazan Beach Soccer Field
Referee: Abdulla Saleh (Bahrain)
18 May 2022
18:30

Kuwait	4–4 (a.e.t.)	Lebanon
M. Darweesh 16'; Hajeyah 19', 27', 29'	Report (WAFF)	M. Matar 18', 24' (pen.); Al Saleh 23'; Merhi 27'
Penalties
Hajeyah (penalty scored); Al-Kandari (penalty scored); J. Al-Harban (penalty scored); F. Al-Manaye (penalty scored)	4–1	(penalty missed) Al Saleh; (penalty missed) M. Haidar; (penalty scored) Kadi

Jazan Beach Soccer Field
Referee: Turki Al Salhi (Oman)

19 May 2022
17:00

Oman	3–1	Kuwait
M. Al Araimi 9'; S. Al Bulushi 18'; K. Al-Oraimi 22'	Report (WAFF)	F. Al-Manaye 32'

Jazan Beach Soccer Field
Referee: Ibrahim Al Raeesi (United Arab Emirates)
19 May 2022
20:00

Lebanon	4–5	United Arab Emirates
S. Jalal 9', 24', 25'; M. Haidar 26'	Report (WAFF)	R. Yaqoub 2', 7', 10', 24'; Pooladi 8'

Jazan Beach Soccer Field
Referee: Abdulaziz Aman (Kuwait)

20 May 2022
17:00

United Arab Emirates	2–1	Kuwait
R. Yaqoub 14'; M. Al-Jasmi 18'	Report (WAFF)	Hajeyah 35'

Jazan Beach Soccer Field
Referee: Hassan Abed Rabbo (Lebanon)
20 May 2022
18:30

Lebanon	4–3	Oman
M. Matar 23'; Kadi 23'; Merhi 27'; Choker 32'	Report (LFA); Report (WAFF)	A. Al Sauti 3'; K. Al-Oraimi 24'; S. Al-Oraimi 26'

Jazan Beach Soccer Field
Referee: Waleed Abdulkareem (Bahrain)

=== Group B ===
Pos	Team	Pld	W	W+	WP	L	GF	GA	GD	Pts	Qualification
1	Bahrain	2	2	0	0	0	7	3	+4	6	Knockout stage
2	Palestine	2	1	0	0	1	8	8	0	3	Knockout stage
3	Saudi Arabia (H)	2	0	0	0	2	5	9	−4	0	5th–7th places

Source: WAFF
Rules for classification: Tiebreakers
(H) Host
18 May 2022
20:00

Palestine	6–4	Saudi Arabia
Al-Bawwab 10', 11'; Al-Sdudi 12'; Shakshak 14'; Atiya 29'; M. Hassan 35'	Report (SAFF); Report (WAFF)	F. Al-Yami 1'; Dakman 4'; M. Al-Ajmi 13'; Tumayhi 25'

Jazan Beach Soccer Field
Referee: Abdulaziz Aman (Kuwait)

19 May 2022
18:30

Bahrain	4–2	Palestine
M. Matooq 3', 4', 32'; Al-Yaqoobi 21'	Report (WAFF)	Al-Neirab 11'; Atiya 14'

Jazan Beach Soccer Field
Referee: Hassan Abed Rabbo (Lebanon)

20 May 2022
20:00

Saudi Arabia	1–3	Bahrain
Mudhaya 29'	Report (SAFF); Report (WAFF)	M. Ashoor 14'; M.Ebrahim 17'; R. Saleem 34'

Jazan Beach Soccer Field
Referee: Falah Al Baloushi (Oman)

== Knockout stage ==
Semi-finals
22 May – Jazan
Oman	6
Palestine	3
22 May – Jazan
Bahrain	2
United Arab Emirates	4

Final
23 May – Jazan
Oman	2
United Arab Emirates	3
Third Place
23 May – Jazan
Palestine	2
Bahrain (a.e.t.)	5

=== Semi-finals ===
May 2022
20:00

Oman	6–3	Palestine
A. Al Sauti 3', 8'; S. Al Bulushi 25' (pen.); S. Al-Oraimi 27'; Y. Al Muraiki 29', 36'	Report (WAFF)	Al-Bawwab 9'; Atiya 21'; Afana 29'

Jazan Beach Soccer Field
Referee: Abdulla Saleh (Bahrain)
22 May 2022
18:30

Bahrain	2–4	United Arab Emirates
Al-Abdulla 16'; M. Ashoor 21'	Report (WAFF)	Al-Muntaser 11', 20'; R. Yaqoub 18'; Pooladi 21'

Jazan Beach Soccer Field
Referee: Abdulaziz Aman (Kuwait)

=== Third place match ===
23 May 2022
18:30

Palestine	2–5 (a.e.t.)	Bahrain
Al-Bawwab 11'; Al-Nahhal 2' (pen.)	Report (BFA)	R. Saleem 27', 37' (e.t.); M. Matooq 32'; Al-Abdulla 37' (e.t.); M. Ashoor 38' (e.t.)

Jazan Beach Soccer Field
Referee: Turki Al Salhi (Oman)

=== Final ===
23 May 2022
20:00

Oman	2–3	United Arab Emirates
Y. Al Muraiki 1'; N. Al Zadjali 30'	Report (WAFF)	Salem 5'; Al-Muntaser 27', 31'

Jazan Beach Soccer Field
Referee: Abdulaziz Aman (Kuwait)

== 5th-7th Matches ==
Pos	Team	Pld	W	W+	WP	L	GF	GA	GD	Pts	Final result
1	Saudi Arabia (H)	2	1	1	0	0	9	6	+3	5	5th Place
2	Kuwait	2	1	0	0	1	6	6	0	3	6th Place
3	Lebanon	2	0	0	0	2	5	8	−3	0	7th Place

Source: SAFF
Rules for classification: Group stage tiebreakers
(H) Host
21 May 2022
18:30

Saudi Arabia	4–3 (a.e.t.)	Kuwait
Hijrini 22'; F. Al-Yami 29' (pen.); Shamhani 30'; Tumayhi 38' (e.t.)	[ Report (WAFF)]	F. Al-Manaye 17'; J. Al-Harban 20' (pen.); Al-Kandari 22'

Jazan Beach Soccer Field
Referee: Abdulla Saleh (Bahrain)

22 May 2022
17:00

Lebanon	2–3	Kuwait
Al Saleh 4'; M. Haidar 15'	[ Report (WAFF)]	M. Al-Qallaf 9' (pen.), 26' (pen.); F. Al-Manaye 16'

Jazan Beach Soccer Field
Referee: Ibrahim Al Raeesi (United Arab Emirates)

23 May 2022
17:00

Lebanon	3–5	Saudi Arabia
Merhi 3', 9', 34'	Report (SAFF)	Mudhaya 3'; Dakman 14'; M. Al-Duoasri 19', 36'; F. Al-Yami 34'

Jazan Beach Soccer Field
Referee: Falah Al Balushi (Oman)

== Goalscorers ==
There were 104 goals scored in 18 matches, for an average of 5.78 goals per match.

6 goals

- (United Arab Emirates) Rashed Yaqoub

5 goals

- (Lebanon) Mohamad Merhi

4 goals

- (Bahrain) Mahran Matooq
- (Kuwait) Mohammad Hajeyah
- (Oman) Abdullah Al Sauti
- (Oman) Sami Al Bulushi
- (Palestine) Maisara Al-Bawwab
- (United Arab Emirates) Hesham Al-Muntaser

3 goals

- (Bahrain) Rashed Saleem
- (Bahrain) Mohamed Ashoor
- (Kuwait) Faisal Al-Manaye
- (Lebanon) Sameh Jalal
- (Lebanon) Mahmoud Matar
- (Oman) Khalid Al-Oraimi
- (Oman) Yahya Al Muraiki
- (Palestine) Alaa Atiya
- (Saudi Arabia) Faisal Al-Yami
- (United Arab Emirates) Mohammad Pooladi

2 goals

- (Bahrain) Abdulla Al-Abdulla
- (Kuwait) Mahdi Al-Qallaf
- (Lebanon) Mohammad Al Saleh
- (Lebanon) Mohammed Haidar
- (Oman) Salim Al-Oraimi
- (Saudi Arabia) Mubarak Al-Duoasri
- (Saudi Arabia) Ramzi Dakman
- (Saudi Arabia) Khalid Mudhaya
- (Saudi Arabia) Yahya Tumayhi

1 goal

- (Bahrain) Salman Al-Yaqoobi
- (Bahrain) Mohamed Ebrahim
- (Kuwait) Mohammad Darweesh
- (Kuwait) Mohammad Al-Kandari
- (Kuwait) Jasem Al-Harban
- (Lebanon) Hassan Kadi
- (Lebanon) Mohamed Choker
- (Oman) Mushel Al Araimi
- (Oman) Nooh Al Zadjali
- (Palestine) Mohammed Al-Sdudi
- (Palestine) Hazem Shakshak
- (Palestine) Mohammed Hassan
- (Palestine) Mahmoud Al-Neirab
- (Palestine) Ahmed Afana
- (Palestine) Naji Al-Nahhal
- (Saudi Arabia) Mohammed Al-Ajmi
- (Saudi Arabia) Ahmed Hijrini
- (Saudi Arabia) Majed Shamhani
- (United Arab Emirates) Abdulla Abbas
- (United Arab Emirates) Mohamed Al-Jasmi
- (United Arab Emirates) Waleed Sulaiman

Source: WAFF
