= Saudi Arabia national beach soccer team =

National beach soccer team

Saudi Arabia
- Nickname(s): أخضر الشاطئية (The beach soccer's Green)
- Association: Saudi Arabian Football Federation
- Confederation: Asian Football Confederation
- Head coach: (Brazil) Gustavinho
- FIFA code: KSA
- BSWW ranking: 17 ▲2 (2 September 2026)
First colours
Second colours

First international
- Saudi Arabia 11–5 Qatar (Dammam, Saudi Arabia; 1 April 2010)

Biggest win
- Saudi Arabia 11–5 Qatar (Dammam, Saudi Arabia; 1 April 2010)

Biggest defeat
- Saudi Arabia 0–8 Egypt (Yanbu, Saudi Arabia; 23 December 2020); Saudi Arabia 2–10 Paraguay (Neom, Saudi Arabia; 10 November 2022)

AFC Beach Soccer Asian Cup
- Appearances: 3 (first in 2013)
- Best result: Fourth Place (2025)

WAFF Beach Soccer Championship
- Appearances: 1 (first in 2022)
- Best result: Fifth place (2022)

Arab Beach Soccer Cup
- Appearances: 3 (first in 2010)
- Best result: (gold) Champions (2010)

The Saudi Arabia national beach soccer team Arabic: المنتخب السعودي الوطني لكرة القدم الشاطئية) represents Saudi Arabia in men's international beach soccer competitions and is controlled by the Saudi Arabian Football Federation (SAFF).

== History ==
Established in the late 2000s, the team played its first competitive matches at the 2010 Arab Beach Soccer Championship, winning the tournament after a 6–4 extra-time victory over the United Arab Emirates. Later that year, the team competed in the GCC Beach Games, losing four of five matches. A three-year hiatus followed before their debut at the 2013 AFC Beach Soccer Championship, where they lost to the UAE and Palestine, defeated Uzbekistan, but forfeited both placement matches, finishing 12th.

At the 2014 Arab Championship, the defending champions were eliminated in the group stage after three losses, prompting another five-year break. The team returned at the 2019 Neom Beach Soccer Cup, hosted in the kingdom, finishing fourth. In 2021, a national development program was launched to prepare the team for future competitions. The side gradually improved, hosting the 2022 WAFF Beach Soccer Championship and finishing 5th after wins over Kuwait and Lebanon. Saudi Arabia continued gaining experience through participation in several international events, including the Casablanca Cup (May 2022), Dubai Intercontinental Cup (November 2022), Acapulco Cup (April 2023), Nouakchott Championship (November 2023), and multiple editions of the NEOM Beach Soccer Cup. In May 2023, they hosted and finished fourth in their first-ever World Beach Games Qualifiers campaign.

In 2024, the team expanded its regional presence, competing in the 2023 COSAFA Beach Soccer Championship and the 2024 Euro Beach Soccer League. Their efforts culminated in a historic run at the 2025 AFC Beach Soccer Asian Cup, where they reached the quarter-finals and then the semi-finals for the first time in the nation's history.

== Players ==
=== Current squad ===
The following players were called to the squad for the 2025 AFC Beach Soccer Asian Cup, held in Thailand from 20 to 30 March 2025.

No.	Pos.	Player	Date of birth (age)	Club
1	GK	Mohammed Saleh Al-Ajmi	7 July 1996 (age 30)	(Saudi Arabian Football Federation) Al-Taawoun
2	GK	Hassan Jamal Al-Eid	24 January 2005 (age 21)	
3	FP	Omar Qaramish Kark	28 October 2002 (age 24)	(Saudi Arabian Football Federation) Al-Taawoun
4	FP	Ahmed Ali Al-Hamami	19 March 2000 (age 26)	(Saudi Arabian Football Federation) Al-Mehmal
5	FP	Rabyi Mohammed Sufyani	25 January 1987 (age 39)	(Saudi Arabian Football Federation) Al-Mehmal
6	FP	Mubarak Tayi Al-Duoasri	1 April 1987 (age 39)	(Saudi Arabian Football Federation) Al-Mehmal
7	FP	Ramzi Abdullah Dakman	29 August 1995 (age 31)	(Saudi Arabian Football Federation) Al-Watan
8	FP	Waleed Mohamed Al-Youbi	9 October 1992 (age 34)	(Saudi Arabian Football Federation) Al-Taawoun
9	FP	Majed Hassan Shamhani	21 October 1999 (age 27)	(Saudi Arabian Football Federation) Al-Taawoun
10	FP	Khalid Waheeb Mudhaya	31 May 1995 (age 31)	(Saudi Arabian Football Federation) Al-Taawoun
11	FP	Eslam Hussain Sarraj	3 July 1989 (age 37)	(Saudi Arabian Football Federation) Al-Taawoun
12	FP	Qasem Ali Dibaji	26 October 2000 (age 26)	(Saudi Arabian Football Federation) Al-Watan

== Competitive record ==
=== FIFA Beach Soccer World Cup ===
FIFA Beach Soccer World Cup record
Year	Round	Pos.	Pld	W	W+	WP	L	GF	GA
(Brazil) 2005	Did not get invited								
(Brazil) 2006	Did not enter								
(Brazil) 2007	Did not enter								
(France) 2008	Did not enter								
(United Arab Emirates) 2009	Did not enter								
(Italy) 2011	Did not enter								
(French Polynesia) 2013	Did not qualify								
(Portugal) 2015	Did not enter								
(The Bahamas) 2017	Did not enter								
(Paraguay) 2019	Did not enter								
(Russia) 2021	Did not get nominated								
(United Arab Emirates) 2024	Did not qualify								
(Seychelles) 2025	Did not qualify								
Total	—	0/11	—	—	—	—	—	—	—

=== AFC Beach Soccer Asian Cup ===
AFC Beach Soccer Asian Cup record
Year	Round	Pos.	Pld	W	W+	WP	L	GF	GA
(United Arab Emirates) 2006	Did not enter								
(United Arab Emirates) 2007	Did not enter								
(United Arab Emirates) 2008	Did not enter								
(United Arab Emirates) 2009	Did not enter								
(Oman) 2011	Did not enter								
(Qatar) 2013	9th place playoff (Note: Although Saudi Arabia played all three of its group stage matches, the team forfeited its subsequent placement matches against Iraq and Afghanistan, both of which were recorded as 3–0 losses.)	12th	5	1	0	0	4	13	26
(Qatar) 2015	Did not enter								
(Malaysia) 2017	Did not enter								
(Thailand) 2019	Did not enter								
(Thailand) 2021	Cancelled (Note: The 2021 edition, initially scheduled for March in Thailand, was postponed and later cancelled due to the COVID-19 pandemic. On 21 April, the AFC selected its World Cup representatives based on performances in the previous three editions, which Saudi Arabia did not enter.)								
(Thailand) 2023	Group stage	9th	3	1	0	1	1	10	10
(Thailand) 2025	Fourth place	4th	6	3	0	0	3	15	24
Total	Fourth place	3/12	14	5	0	1	8	38	60

=== Asian Beach Games ===
Asian Beach Games record
Year	Round	Pos.	Pld	W	W+	WP	L	GF	GA
(Indonesia) 2008	Did not enter								
(Oman) 2010	Did not enter								
(China) 2012	Did not enter								
(Thailand) 2014	Did not enter								
(Vietnam) 2016	Did not enter								
(China) 2026	Bronze medal match	3rd	5	2	1	0	2	27	19
Total	Bronze medalist	1/6	5	2	1	0	2	27	19

=== Arab Beach Soccer Cup ===
Arab Beach Soccer Cup record
Year	Round	Pos.	Pld	W	W+	WP	L	GF	GA
(Egypt) 2008	Did not enter								
(Saudi Arabia) 2010	Final	1st	6	4	1	0	1	39	24
(Egypt) 2014	Group stage	7th	3	0	0	0	3	11	21
(Saudi Arabia) 2023	Quarter-finals	6th	4	2	0	0	2	18	18
(Mauritania) 2027	To be determined								
(Mauritania) 2029	To be determined								
Total	Champions	3/4	13	6	1	0	6	68	63

2026 Arab Beach Soccer Championship

=== WAFF Beach Soccer Championship ===
WAFF Beach Soccer Championship record
Year	Round	Pos.	Pld	W	W+	WP	L	GF	GA
(Iran) 2013	Did not enter								
(Saudi Arabia) 2022	5th place playoff	5th	4	1	1	0	2	14	15
Total	Fifth place	1/2	4	1	1	0	2	14	15

=== Neom Beach Soccer Cup ===
- 2019 Neom Beach Soccer Cup

=== COSAFA Beach Soccer Championship ===
- 2023 COSAFA Beach Soccer Championship
