= Beach soccer at the Asian Beach Games =

Beach soccer at the Asian Games
- Organiser(s): OCA; BSWW
- Founded: 2008; 18 years ago
- Region: Asia (AFC)
- Current champions: Iran (3rd title)
- Most championships: Iran (3 titles)

The Beach soccer at the Asian Beach Games is a Beach soccer competition of the Asian Beach Games. It was first held in 2008 in Indonesia.

== Results ==
#	Year	Host	Final			Third place			Teams
#	Year	Host	Winner	Score	Runner-up	3rd place	Score	4th place	Teams
1	2008	(Indonesia); Bali	Oman	3–1	United Arab Emirates	Bahrain	2–1	South Korea	16
2	2010	(Oman); Muscat	United Arab Emirates	2–2 aet (2–1) pen	Oman	Iran	6–1	China	16
3	2012	(China); Haiyang	Iran	2–0	China	Palestine	6–5	Lebanon	15
4	2014	(Thailand); Phuket	Iran	4–3	Japan	United Arab Emirates	8–2	Vietnam	13
5	2016	(Vietnam); Da Nang	Japan	4–3 aet	Oman	Lebanon	9–5	Afghanistan	11
6	2026	(China); Sanya	Iran	6–2	Oman	Saudi Arabia	6–4 aet	Palestine	7

== Medal table ==
Rank	Nation	Gold	Silver	Bronze	Total
1	Iran (IRI)	3	0	1	4
2	Oman (OMA)	1	3	0	4
3	United Arab Emirates (UAE)	1	1	1	3
4	Japan (JPN)	1	1	0	2
5	China (CHN)	0	1	0	1
6	Bahrain (BRN)	0	0	1	1
6	Lebanon (LBN)	0	0	1	1
6	Palestine (PLE)	0	0	1	1
6	Saudi Arabia (KSA)	0	0	1	1
Totals (9 entries)		6	6	6	18

== Participating nations ==
Legend

- QF — Quarterfinals
- R1 — Round 1

Team	(Indonesia) 2008	(Oman) 2010	(China) 2012	(Thailand) 2014	(Vietnam) 2016	(China) 2026	Years
Afghanistan			R1		4th		2
Bahrain	3rd	QF	R1	R1			4
China	QF	4th	2nd	8th	R1	R1	6
India	R1						1
Indonesia	QF	R1					2
Iran	QF	3rd	1st	1st		1st	5
Iraq			R1				1
Japan		QF	QF	2nd	1st		4
Kuwait	R1	R1	R1	R1			4
Laos					R1		1
Lebanon		R1	4th		3rd		3
Malaysia	R1			R1			2
Myanmar	R1						1
Oman	1st	2nd	QF	5th	2nd	2nd	6
Palestine		R1	3rd			4th	3
Qatar	R1	R1	R1	R1	R1		5
Saudi Arabia						3rd	1
South Korea	4th						1
Syria		QF	QF	R1			3
Thailand	R1	R1	R1	7th	QF	R1	6
Timor-Leste	R1						1
United Arab Emirates	2nd	1st	QF	3rd	QF	R1	6
Uzbekistan	QF	R1		6th	QF		4
Vietnam	R1	R1	R1	4th	QF		5
Yemen		QF					1
Teams (25)	16	16	15	13	11	7	_

== See also ==
- Beach Soccer World Cup
- AFC Beach Soccer Asian Cup
- Football at the Asian Games
- Asian Football Confederation
