= West Asian Football Federation =

Governing body of football in West Asia

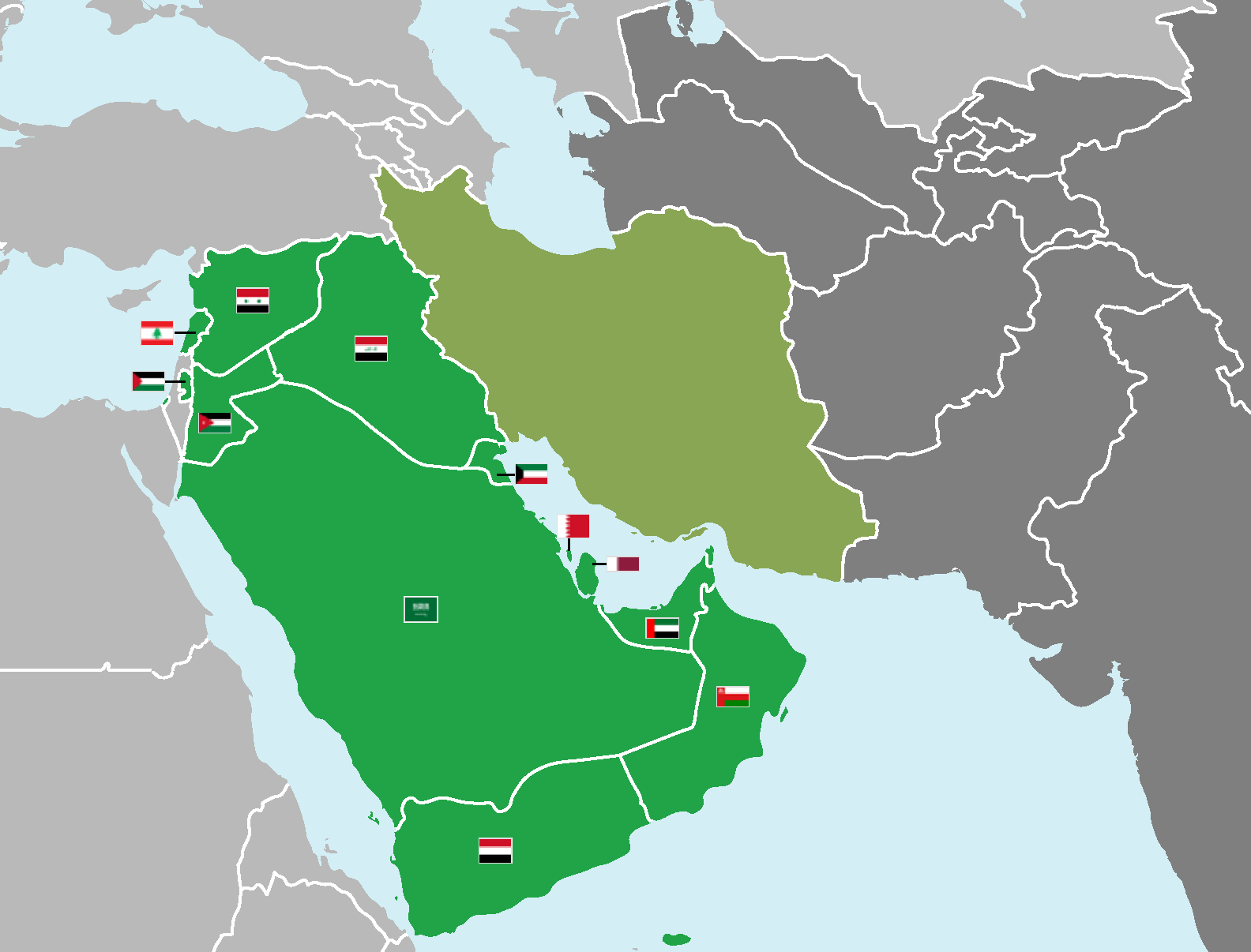
- WAFF member associations
- Formation: 24 May 2000; 26 years ago
- Type: Sports organisation
- Headquarters: Amman, Jordan
- Members: 12 member associations
- Official languages: Arabic, English
- General Secretary: Khalil Al Salem
- President: Prince Ali bin Hussein
- Parent organization: AFC
- Website: the-waff.com

The West Asian Football Federation (WAFF; Arabic: اتحاد غرب آسيا لكرة القدم) is a regional sub-confederation of association football operating under the Asian Football Confederation (AFC). Founded in Amman, Jordan, on 24 May 2000 upon the initiative of Prince Ali bin Hussein, it governs association football, futsal, and beach soccer for 12 member associations across West Asia.

Originally established by six national associations—Iran, Iraq, Jordan, Lebanon, Palestine, and Syria—the federation expanded to include the nations of the Arabian Peninsula in 2009 and 2010 before Iran departed in 2014 to co-found the Central Asian Football Association (CAFA). Headquartered in Amman, the WAFF organises regional tournaments for men's and women's senior, youth, futsal, and beach soccer national teams, as well as the WAFF Women's Clubs Championship.

== History ==
The West Asian Football Federation was founded on 24 May 2000 in Amman, on the sidelines of the inaugural King Hussein International Friendly Cup, by six founding member associations: Iran, Iraq, Jordan, Lebanon, Palestine, and Syria. Prince Ali bin Hussein of Jordan was elected as the federation's inaugural president.

The federation underwent two rounds of expansion over the following decade. In 2009, three additional associations—Qatar, the United Arab Emirates, and Yemen—joined the WAFF. Four further West Asian nations—Bahrain, Kuwait, Oman, and the Saudi Arabia—became members in 2010, bringing the total membership to 13.

On 10 June 2014, following approval by the AFC Extraordinary Congress in São Paulo to create a fifth regional zone, Iran left the WAFF to co-found the Central Asian Football Association (CAFA), reducing WAFF membership to 12. In January 2015, following the 2015 AFC Asian Cup, several WAFF members reportedly lobbied to remove Australia from the AFC, arguing that Australia derived disproportionate benefits from Asian football.

Prince Ali has remained president since the federation's founding; in January 2023, he was re-elected for a further term running through 2027, with Khalil Al Salem serving as general secretary.

== Member associations ==
The WAFF comprises 12 member associations, all of which are full members of both FIFA and the AFC.

Code	Association	National teams	Founded	FIFA affiliation	WAFF affiliation	IOC member
BHR	Bahrain	Men's; U23; U20; U17; F; BS; Women's; U20; U17	1957	1968	2010	Yes
IRQ	Iraq	Men's; U23; U20; U17; F; BS; Women's; U20; U17	1948	1950	2000	Yes
JOR	Jordan	Men's; U23; U20; U17; F; BS; Women's; U20; U17	1949	1956	2000	Yes
KUW	Kuwait	Men's; U23; U20; U17; F; BS; Women's; U20; U17	1952	1964	2010	Yes
LBN	Lebanon	Men's; U23; U20; U17; F; BS; Women's; U20; U17	1933	1936	2000	Yes
OMA	Oman	Men's; U23; U20; U17; F; BS; Women's; U20; U17	1978	1978	2010	Yes
PLE	Palestine	Men's; U23; U20; U17; F; BS; Women's; U20; U17	1962	1998	2000	Yes
QAT	Qatar	Men's; U23; U20; U17; F; BS; Women's; U20; U17	1960	1963	2009	Yes
KSA	Saudi Arabia	Men's; U23; U20; U17; F; BS; Women's; U20; U17	1956	1956	2010	Yes
SYR	Syria	Men's; U23; U20; U17; F; BS; Women's; U20; U17	1936	1937	2000	Yes
UAE	United Arab Emirates	Men's; U23; U20; U17; F; BS; Women's; U20; U17	1971	1974	2009	Yes
YEM	Yemen	Men's; U23; U20; U17; F; BS; Women's; U20; U17	1962	1980	2009	Yes

=== Former members ===
Association	Years	Note
Iran	2000–2014	Left to co-found the Central Asian Football Association

== Competitions ==
The WAFF organises regional tournaments across men's and women's senior, youth, futsal, and beach soccer national teams, as well as a women's club championship. Its flagship competition is the men's WAFF Championship, first contested in 2000, alongside the WAFF Women's Championship, launched in 2005.

=== Current title holders ===
Tournament	Year	Champions	Title	Runners-up	Next edition
Men's national teams
WAFF Championship	2019 (final)	Bahrain	1st	Iraq	2026
WAFF U-23 Championship	2025	Oman	1st	Jordan	2026
WAFF U-19 Championship	2024	Saudi Arabia	1st	United Arab Emirates	2027
WAFF U-17 Championship	2026	Lebanon	1st	Yemen	2027
WAFF Futsal Championship	2022	Kuwait	1st	Saudi Arabia	TBD
WAFF Beach Soccer Championship	2022	United Arab Emirates	1st	Oman	TBD
Women's national teams
WAFF Women's Championship	2025	Jordan	7th	Palestine	TBD
WAFF U-20 Girls Championship	2025	Palestine	1st	Jordan	TBD
WAFF U-17 Girls Championship	2026	Syria	1st	Lebanon	TBD
WAFF U-14 Girls Championship	2025	Jordan	2nd	Lebanon	TBD
WAFF Futsal Women's Championship	2022	Iraq	1st	Saudi Arabia	TBD
Women's club teams
WAFF Women's Clubs Championship	2026	(Saudi Arabia) Al-Nassr	1st	(Syria) Al-Hilal	TBD

== Rankings ==
=== Men's national football teams ===
FIFA Men's World Rankings (as of 18 November 2026)
WAFF*	FIFA	±	National team	Points
1	54	▲1	Saudi Arabia	1443.94
2	61	▼1	Qatar	1409.34
3	62	▲1	Iraq	1400.66
4	66	▼1	United Arab Emirates	1385.91
5	72	Steady	Jordan	1357.97
6	82	▼1	Oman	1298.49
7	88	▼2	Syria	1269.3
8	92	Steady	Palestine	1250.89
9	96	▲1	Bahrain	1243.72
10	111	▲1	Lebanon	1173.14
11	134	Steady	Kuwait	1102.66
12	148	▼4	Yemen	1059.45
*Local rankings based on FIFA ranking points

Leading men's team:

=== Women's national football teams ===
FIFA Women's World Rankings (as of 20 October 2026)
WAFF*	FIFA	±	National team	Points
1	79	▼1	Jordan	1283.62
2	117	▼1	Bahrain	1146.97
3	125	▼1	United Arab Emirates	1126.67
4	127	▲2	Palestine	1111.4
5	130	Steady	Lebanon	1100.95
6	157	Steady	Saudi Arabia	980.32
7	162	Steady	Syria	931.42
8	166	Steady	Iraq	910.49
*Local rankings based on FIFA ranking points

Leading women's team:

=== Men's national futsal teams ===
FIFA Men's Futsal World Rankings (as of 24 September 2026)
WAFF*	FIFA	±	National team	Points
1	23	▲1	Iraq	1186.9
2	40	▲1	Saudi Arabia	1090.27
3	43	Steady	Kuwait	1080.32
4	71	▲1	Lebanon	986.28
5	75	Steady	Bahrain	977.65
6	89	▲1	Qatar	945.32
7	91	▲1	Oman	940.88
8	100	Steady	United Arab Emirates	906.64
9	122	Steady	Palestine	838.37
*Local rankings based on FIFA ranking points

=== Women's national futsal teams ===
FIFA Women's Futsal World Rankings (as of 24 September 2026)
WAFF*	FIFA	±	National team	Points
1	31	Steady	Palestine	959.82
2	38	Steady	Bahrain	937.24
3	42	Steady	Lebanon	925.89
4	45	Steady	Saudi Arabia	915.23
5	50	Steady	Iraq	894.16
6	52	Steady	United Arab Emirates	885.35
7	62	Steady	Oman	848.46
8	77	Steady	Kuwait	775.6
*Local rankings based on FIFA ranking points

=== Men's national beach soccer teams ===
As of 19 January 2026

WAFF	World	Country	Points
1	9	United Arab Emirates	1371.75
2	11	Oman	1308.5
3	21	Saudi Arabia	689.25
4	43	Bahrain	254.25
5	45	Lebanon	247.25
6	48	Kuwait	216.25
7	71	Palestine	89.75
8	74	Iraq	87

== See also ==
- FIFA
  - Asian Football Confederation (AFC)
    - ASEAN Football Federation (AFF)
    - Central Asian Football Association (CAFA)
    - East Asian Football Federation (EAFF)
    - South Asian Football Federation (SAFF)
