= India national beach soccer team =

India
- Association: All India Football Federation
- Confederation: AFC (Asia)
- Head coach: Mohamad Faizal bin Mohamad Sood
- FIFA code: IND
- BSWW ranking: 74 ▲1 (2 September 2026)
First colours
Second colours

First international
- India 2–6 United Arab Emirates (Dubai, United Arab Emirates; 14 August 2007)

Biggest defeat
- India 1–6 Lebanon (Pattaya, Thailand; 24 March 2025)

World Cup
- Appearances: 0

AFC Beach Soccer Asian Cup
- Appearances: 2 (first in 2007)
- Best result: 6th (2007)

The India national beach soccer team represents India in international beach soccer competitions and is controlled by the AIFF, the governing body for football in India.

== History ==
The team first participated at the 2007 AFC Beach Soccer Championship. India was drawn along with United Arab Emirates (UAE) and Japan in Group A. On 14 August 2007, India made its debut against UAE which they lost by 6–2. India also lost the next group match against Japan by 4–3 on 15 August 2007, and thus failed to reach the knockout stage of the tournament. The team went on to participate at the 2008 Asian Beach Games where they were defeated by China, Iran and Malaysia.

The India national team did not play any matches after their participation in the 2008 Asian Games until 2025, when the team made its comeback after 17 years to participate at the 2025 AFC Beach Soccer Asian Cup. India was drawn in Group A along with Thailand, Kuwait and Lebanon.

== Results and fixtures ==
Legend

Win Draw Lose Fixture

== Coaching staff ==
As of 13 March 2025

Role	Name
Head coach	(Malaysia) Mohamad Faizal bin Mohamad Sood
Assistant coach	(India) Akshay Negi
Goalkeeping coach	(India) Suraj Jaiswal

== Players ==
=== Current squad ===
The following players were called up for the 2025 AFC Beach Soccer Asian Cup.

No.	Pos.	Player	Date of birth (age)	Club
	GK	Pratik Kankonkar		(All India Football Federation) Sporting Goa
	GK	Raj Chauhan		(All India Football Federation)
	DF	Nehal Parab		(All India Football Federation)
	DF	Sreejith Babu		(All India Football Federation) Travancore Royals
	DF	Jaypal Singh		(All India Football Federation)
	DF	Mukhtar Umarul		(All India Football Federation)
	MF	T. K. B. Musheer		(All India Football Federation)
	MF	Rohith Yesudas		(All India Football Federation) Travancore Royals
	MF	Latish Kunkalkar		(All India Football Federation)
	FW	Amit Godara		(All India Football Federation) Rajasthan United
	FW	Satish Naik		(All India Football Federation)
	FW	Mohmmad Akram		(All India Football Federation)

== Competitive record ==
=== AFC Beach Soccer Asian Cup ===
AFC Beach Soccer Asian Cup record
Year	Result	GP	W	D	L	GS	GA	GD
(United Arab Emirates) 2006	Did not enter							
(United Arab Emirates) 2007	Group stage	2	0	0	2	5	10	–5
(United Arab Emirates) 2008 to (Thailand) 2023	Did not enter							
(Thailand) 2025	Group stage	3	0	0	3	3	13	–10
Total	Group stage	5	0	0	5	8	23	–15

=== Asian Beach Games ===
Asian Beach Games record
Year	Result	GP	W	D	L	GS	GA	GD
(Indonesia) 2008	Group stage	3	0	1	2	9	13	–4
(Oman) 2010 to (Vietnam) 2016	Did not enter							
Total	Group stage	3	0	1	2	9	13	–4

=== Overall results ===
1. 2007 AFC Beach Soccer Championship
2. 2025 AFC Beach Soccer Asian Cup
3. Beach soccer at the 2008 Asian Beach Games

Against	M	W	D	L	GF	GA	GD
Total	8	0	1	7	17	36	–19

== See also ==
- Football in India
- Indian football league system
- Sport in India
- Beach Soccer Worldwide
- FIFA Beach Soccer World Cup
- AFC Beach Soccer Asian Cup
