= Arab Beach Soccer Cup =

- Founded: 2008
- Region: Arab world (UAFA)
- Teams: 8
- Current champions: Morocco
- Most championships: Egypt (2 titles)
- 2026 Arab Beach Soccer Cup

The Arab Beach Soccer Cup (Arabic: كأس العرب لكرة القدم الشاطئية) is the main championship for beach soccer in the Arab world. The first championship was held in 2008 in Marsa Alam, Egypt. The most successful nations is Egypt. The current champions are Morocco, having beaten Mauritania 6–5 in the 2026 final.

== History ==
Started on 2008, the competition changed the name from Championship to Cup on the 2023 edition.

In the 2023 edition, Egypt claimed their second title after defeating Oman 4–2 in the final. The fifth edition was claimed by Morocco, having beaten Mauritania 6–5 in the 2026 final.

== Results ==
| Ed. | Year | Host | First place game | | | Third place game | | |
| Ed. | Year | Host | (gold) Champion | Score | (silver) Runner-up | (bronze) Third place | Score | Fourth place |
|---|---|---|---|---|---|---|---|---|
| 1 | 2008 | Egypt (Marsa Alam) | Libya | 5–3 | United Arab Emirates | Egypt | 8–2 | Oman |
| 2 | 2010 | Saudi Arabia (Dammam) | Saudi Arabia | 6–4 (aet) | United Arab Emirates | Bahrain | 3–1 | Egypt |
| 3 | 2014 | Egypt (Sharm el Sheikh) | Egypt | 6–5 | Lebanon | Oman | 7–3 | United Arab Emirates |
| 4 | 2023 | Saudi Arabia (Jeddah) | Egypt | 4–2 | Oman | Morocco and Palestine (Note: No third place match was played.) | | |
| 5 | 2026 | Egypt (Port Said) | Morocco | 6–5 | Mauritania | Egypt and Lebanon | | |
| 6 | 2027 | TBD | TBD | | | TBD | | |

== Successful nations ==
| Team | Champions | Runners-up | Third-place | Fourth Place | Semi-final | Total |
|---|---|---|---|---|---|---|
| Egypt | 2 (2014, 2023) | —N/a | 1 (2008) | 1 (2010) | 1 (2026) | 5 |
| Morocco | 1 (2026) | —N/a | —N/a | —N/a | 1 (2023) | 2 |
| Libya | 1 (2008) | —N/a | —N/a | —N/a | —N/a | 1 |
| Saudi Arabia | 1 (2010) | —N/a | —N/a | —N/a | —N/a | 1 |
| United Arab Emirates | —N/a | 2 (2008, 2010) | —N/a | 1 (2014) | —N/a | 3 |
| Oman | —N/a | 1 (2023) | 1 (2014) | 1 (2008) | —N/a | 3 |
| Lebanon | —N/a | 1 (2014) | —N/a | —N/a | 1 (2026) | 2 |
| Mauritania | —N/a | 1 (2026) | —N/a | —N/a | —N/a | 1 |
| Bahrain | —N/a | —N/a | 1 (2010) | —N/a | —N/a | 1 |
| Palestine | —N/a | —N/a | —N/a | —N/a | 1 (2023) | 1 |

== Awards ==
| Year | Top goalscorer(s) | Gls | Best player | Best goalkeeper | Ref. |
|---|---|---|---|---|---|
| (Egypt) 2026 | (Lebanon) Mohammad Al Saleh | 8 | (Mauritania) Cheikh Belkheir | (Morocco) M'hamed Manar | |

== Participating nations ==
| Team | (Egypt) 2008 | (Saudi Arabia) 2010 | (Egypt) 2014 | (Saudi Arabia) 2023 | (Egypt) 2026 | Years |
|---|---|---|---|---|---|---|
| Algeria | GS | × | × | × | × | 1 |
| Bahrain | × | 3rd | × | × | × | 1 |
| Comoros | × | × | × | GS | × | 1 |
| Egypt | 3rd | 4th | 1st | 1st | SF | 5 |
| Iraq | × | × | × | × | GS | 1 |
| Kuwait | GS | GS | × | GS | × | 3 |
| Kyrgyzstan | × | × | × | GS | × | 1 |
| Lebanon | × | × | 2nd | GS | SF | 3 |
| Libya | 1st | GS | × | QF | GS | 4 |
| Mauritania | × | × | × | QF | 2nd | 2 |
| Morocco | GS | × | GS | SF | 1st | 4 |
| Oman | 4th | GS | 3rd | 2nd | GS | 5 |
| Palestine | × | × | × | SF | × | 1 |
| Qatar | × | GS | × | × | × | 1 |
| Saudi Arabia | × | 1st | GS | QF | GS | 4 |
| Sudan | × | × | GS | × | × | 1 |
| Syria | × | GS | × | × | × | 1 |
| United Arab Emirates | 2nd | 2nd | 4th | QF | × | 4 |
| Yemen | GS | GS | × | × | × | 2 |
| Total | 8 | 10 | 7 | 12 | 8 | |

- Red Border: Host nation.
- Blank: Did not enter.
- GS: Group Stage.

== Related tournament ==
In 2016 was held in Egypt a Sharm el-Sheik International Beach Soccer Championship. United Arab Emirates wons the tournament beating Morocco on the final. Egypt finished third and Oman fourth.

== See also ==
- 2019 Neom Beach Soccer Cup
