= Behzad Dadashzadeh =

Iranian footballer and manager (born 1971)

Personal information
- Full name: Behzad Dadashzadeh
- Date of birth: June 22, 1971 (age 55)
- Place of birth: Rasht, Iran
- Position: Midfielder

Senior career*
Years	Team	Apps	(Gls)
1990–1992	Esteghlal Rasht	40	(1)
1992–1996	Persepolis	87	(6)
1996–1997	Payam Khorasan	30	(4)
1997–1999	Zob Ahan Esfahan	59	(1)
1999–2002	Esteghlal	74	(3)
2002–2003	Bargh Shiraz	26	(0)
2003–2004	Azarbijan Tehran	16	(1)

International career
1990–1991	Iran U-18	12	(2)
1991–1992	Iran U-23	18	(6)
1993–1996	Iran	7	(0)
2006	Iran national beach team	14	(2)

Managerial career
- 2007–2008: Iran national beach team
- 2009–2010: Damash Gilan (Assistant)
- 2010–2012: Iran national beach team
- 2012–2014: Lebanon national beach team
- 2015–2016: Sanat Sari
- * Club domestic league appearances and goals

Behzad Dadashzadeh,(Persian: بهزاد داداش‌زاده; born June 22, 1971) is an Iranian retired football player and now manager. He was a midfielder for a number of clubs, most notably Persepolis F.C. and Esteghlal F.C. as well as the Iran national football team.

== Club career ==
Dadashzadeh started his club career with Esteghlal Rasht F.C. and then Persepolis F.C. and also played for Payam Mashhad F.C., Zob Ahan F.C., Esteghlal F.C. and Bargh Shiraz F.C. and Azarbijan Tehran

== International career ==
He played for Iran national team in 1994 World Cup Qualification round, 1994 Asian Games and 2006 FIFA Beach Soccer World Cup and AFC Beach Soccer Championship.

== Coaching career ==
He was one of the coaches of the Iran national beach soccer team in 2006 FIFA Beach Soccer, 2007 FIFA Beach Soccer and then again in the 2008 FIFA Beach Soccer World Cup. He was re-appointed in January 2010. He was also assistant coach of Damash Gilan F.C. in the 2009–10 Azadegan League.

== Honors ==
=== Iran ===
- AFC Asian Cup
  - 1992, Group Stage
- Asian Games
  - 1994 Asian Games Group Stage

=== Persepolis FC ===
- Asian Cup Winners' Cup
  - 1992–93 Runner-up
- Azadegan League
  - 1992 Runner-up
  - 1993 Runner-up
  - 1995–96 Champions

=== Esteghlal FC ===
- Iran Pro League
  - 2001–2002 Runner-up
- Azadegan League
  - 1999–2000 Runner-up
  - 2000–2001 Champions
- Hazfi Cup
  - 1999–2000 Champions
  - 2001–2002 Champions
