= 2013 WAFF Beach Soccer Championship =

Coordinates: 26°59′7.9″N 56°13′27.2″E

Tournament details
- Host country: Iran
- Dates: 1–5 May
- Teams: 7 (from 1 confederation)
- Venue(s): 1 (in 1 host city)

Final positions
- Champions: Iran (1st title)
- Runners-up: Oman
- Third place: Palestine
- Fourth place: Bahrain

Tournament statistics
- Matches played: 13
- Goals scored: 100 (7.69 per match)
- Top scorer(s): (Oman) Khalid al Araimi (9 goals)

The 2013 WAFF Beach Soccer Championship was the first beach soccer championship for West Asia, held from 1–5 May 2013, in Qeshm, Iran. Seven teams from the WAFF participated in the inaugural event.

== Participants ==
- Qatar
- Palestine
- Iran (hosts)
- Lebanon
- Iraq
- Oman
- Bahrain

== Group stage ==
=== Group A ===
| Team | Pld | W | W+ | L | GF | GA | GD | Pts |
|---|---|---|---|---|---|---|---|---|
| Oman (A) | 3 | 3 | 0 | 0 | 17 | 6 | +11 | 9 |
| Bahrain (A) | 3 | 2 | 0 | 1 | 12 | 8 | +4 | 6 |
| Lebanon | 3 | 1 | 0 | 2 | 10 | 13 | −3 | 3 |
| Qatar | 3 | 0 | 0 | 3 | 7 | 19 | −12 | 0 |

(A) Advanced to the semi-finals
1 May 2013
14:30

| Oman | 5–2 | Bahrain |

1 May 2013
16:00

| Lebanon | 7–3 | Qatar |

2 May 2013
14:30

| Oman | 5–3 | Lebanon |

2 May 2013
16:00

| Bahrain | 5–3 | Qatar |

3 May 2013
14:30

| Qatar | 1–7 | Oman |

3 May 2013
16:00

| Lebanon | 0–5 | Bahrain |

=== Group B ===
| Team | Pld | W | W+ | L | GF | GA | GD | Pts |
|---|---|---|---|---|---|---|---|---|
| Iran (A) | 2 | 2 | 0 | 0 | 11 | 3 | +8 | 6 |
| Palestine (A) | 2 | 1 | 0 | 1 | 10 | 6 | +4 | 3 |
| Iraq | 2 | 0 | 0 | 2 | 4 | 16 | −12 | 0 |

(A) Advanced to the semi-finals
1 May 2013
17:30

| Iran | 8–1 | Iraq |

2 May 2013
17:30

| Iraq | 3–8 | Palestine |

3 May 2013
17:30

| Palestine | 2–3 | Iran |

== Knockout stage ==
Semi-finals
4 October 2013
Oman | 6
Palestine | 1
4 October 2013
Iran | 6
Bahrain | 2

Final
5 October 2013
Oman | 3
Iran | 4
Third place
5 October 2013
Bahrain | 3
Palestine | 4

=== Semi-finals ===
4 May 2013

| Oman | 6–1 | Palestine |

4 May 2013

| Iran | 6–2 | Bahrain |

=== Third-place ===
5 May 2013

| Bahrain | 3–4 | Palestine |

=== Final ===
5 May 2013

| Iran | 3–3 (1-0) Penalty | Oman |

== Final standings ==
| Rank | Team |
|---|---|
| 1 | Iran |
| 2 | Oman |
| 3 | Palestine |
| 4 | Bahrain |
| 5 | Lebanon |
| 6 | Qatar |
| 7 | Iraq |
