= AFC Beach Soccer Asian Cup =

- Organiser(s): AFC
- Founded: 2006; 20 years ago
- Region: Asia
- Teams: ~16
- Qualifier for: FIFA Beach Soccer World Cup
- Current champions: Iran (4th title)
- Most championships: Iran (4 titles)
- Website: afc.com
- 2026 AFC Beach Soccer Asian Cup

The AFC Beach Soccer Asian Cup is the main championship for beach soccer in Asia, contested between the senior men's national teams of the members of the Asian Football Confederation (AFC). It is the sport's version of the better known AFC Asian Cup in association football.

The winners of the championship are crowned continental champions; the tournament also acts as the qualification route for Asian nations to the upcoming edition of the FIFA Beach Soccer World Cup. Coinciding with the annual staging of the World Cup, the competition took place yearly until 2009; the World Cup then became biennial, and as its supplementary qualification event, the championship followed suit. Iran are the most successful nation with four titles.

== History ==
The championship was established in 2006 by Beach Soccer Worldwide (BSWW) under the title, FIFA Beach Soccer World Cup AFC qualifier; after FIFA made it a requirement for all confederations to begin holding qualification tournaments to determine the best national team(s) in their region who would proceed to represent their continent in the upcoming World Cup (previously, nations were simply invited to play, without having to earn their place). BSWW organised the first six editions. During this time it also became informally known by the misnomer, the AFC Beach Soccer Championship.

In 2015, the Asia's governing body for football, the AFC adopted the competition and branded it using its informal title in an official capacity; they jointly organised that year's edition with BSWW. Since 2017, the AFC have been sole organisers. For 2021, the competition was renamed as the AFC Beach Soccer Asian Cup, bringing it in line with the naming of other AFC senior national tournaments.

== Results ==
For all tournaments, the top three teams qualified for the FIFA Beach Soccer World Cup (except for 2009, when only the top two teams qualified as one of the AFC spots was automatically given to the World Cup hosts, United Arab Emirates).

Tournament names

- FIFA Beach Soccer World Cup qualifiers for (AFC)
- 2006 – 2019: AFC Beach Soccer Championship
- 2021 – present: AFC Beach Soccer Asian Cup

#	Year	Location	Final			Third place play-off			Teams
#	Year	Location	Winners	Score	Runners-up	Third place	Score	Fourth place	Teams
Organized by Beach Soccer Worldwide (BSWW)
1	2006 details	Dubai, United Arab Emirates	Bahrain	5–3	Japan	Iran	6–4	China	6
2	2007 details	Dubai, United Arab Emirates	United Arab Emirates	4–3	Japan	Iran	6–0	Bahrain	6
3	2008 details	Dubai, United Arab Emirates	United Arab Emirates	4–3	Japan	Iran	4–1	China	6
4	2009 details	Dubai, United Arab Emirates^{[a]}	Japan	4–2	Bahrain	Oman	1–1 (a.e.t.) (2–1 p)	Iran	7
5	2011 details	Muscat, Oman	Japan	2–1	Oman	Iran	6–2	United Arab Emirates	11
6	2013 details	Doha, Qatar	Iran	6–6 (a.e.t.) (5–4 p)	Japan	United Arab Emirates	3–2	Australia	16
Organized by Beach Soccer Worldwide (BSWW) and Asian Football Confederation (AFC)
7	2015 details	Doha, Qatar	Oman	1–1 (a.e.t.) (3–2 p)	Japan	Iran	8–3	Lebanon	14
Organized by Asian Football Confederation (AFC)
8	2017 details	Kuala Terengganu, Malaysia	Iran	7–2	United Arab Emirates	Japan	6–3	Lebanon	12
9	2019 details	Pattaya, Thailand	Japan	2–2 (a.e.t.) (3–1 p)	United Arab Emirates	Oman	2–2 (a.e.t.) (2–1 p)	Palestine	15
–	2021 details	Phuket, Thailand	Canceled due to COVID-19 pandemic. Teams to play at the World Cup handpicked by the AFC.						–
10	2023 details	Pattaya, Thailand	Iran	6–0	Japan	Oman	4–2	United Arab Emirates	16
11	2025 details	Pattaya, Thailand	Iran	8–1	Oman	Japan	3–1	Saudi Arabia	16
12	2026 details	Phang Nga, Thailand							12

a. Despite being hosts and defending champions, the United Arab Emirates did not participate in the championship as they had already qualified automatically for the 2009 World Cup as its host nation.

== Teams reaching the top four ==
Team	Titles	Runners-up	Third place	Fourth place	Total
Iran	4 (2013, 2017, 2023, 2025)	–	5 (2006, 2007, 2008, 2011, 2015)	1 (2009)	10
Japan	3 (2009, 2011, 2019)	6 (2006, 2007, 2008, 2013, 2015, 2023)	2 (2017, 2025)	–	11
United Arab Emirates	2 (2007*, 2008*)	2 (2017, 2019)	1 (2013)	2 (2011, 2023)	7
Oman	1 (2015)	2 (2011*, 2025)	3 (2009, 2019, 2023)	–	6
Bahrain	1 (2006)	1 (2009)	–	1 (2007)	3
China	–	–	–	2 (2006, 2008)	2
Lebanon	–	–	–	2 (2015, 2017)	2
Australia	–	–	–	1 (2013)	1
Palestine	–	–	–	1 (2019)	1
Saudi Arabia	–	–	–	1 (2025)	1

* Hosts

== Summary (2006–2025) ==
Rank	Team	Part	M	W	WE	WP	L	GF	GA	GD	Points
1	Japan	12	55	40	1	2	12	289	137	+152	124
2	Iran	12	53	39	1	1	12	334	129	+205	120
3	United Arab Emirates	10	46	32	0	1	13	196	129	+87	97
4	Oman	8	40	28	0	4	8	177	97	+80	88
5	Bahrain	10	43	21	1	2	19	136	145	-9	67
6	China	11	42	12	1	2	27	119	182	–63	40
7	Lebanon	6	25	10	1	0	14	106	89	+17	32
8	Palestine	3	14	7	1	0	6	48	52	–8	23
9	Thailand	6	20	7	1	0	12	55	68	–13	23
11	Uzbekistan	6	21	5	0	0	16	72	94	–22	15
12	Afghanistan	5	18	4	1	0	13	53	85	–32	14
14	Australia	2	8	3	0	1	4	25	24	+1	10
13	Kuwait	5	16	4	0	1	11	55	72	–17	13
16	Iraq	6	18	2	1	1	14	48	93	–45	9
10	Saudi Arabia	3	14	5	0	1	8	38	60	–22	16
15	Malaysia	4	15	3	0	0	12	42	83	–41	9
17	Laos	1	3	1	0	0	2	11	21	–10	3
19	Qatar	4	14	1	0	0	13	30	85	–55	3
20	Vietnam	2	6	0	1	0	5	17	26	–9	2
21	India	2	5	0	0	0	5	8	23	–15	0
22	Syria	1	3	0	0	0	3	6	19	–13	0
23	Kyrgyzstan	2	6	0	0	0	6	12	40	–28	0
18	Indonesia	3	9	1	0	0	8	19	64	–45	3
24	Philippines	3	9	0	0	0	9	13	90	–77	0
25	Myanmar	0	0	0	0	0	0	0	0	0	0

Points: W = 3 points / WE = 2 points / WP = 1 points / L = 0 points

== Awards ==
=== By category ===
Year	Top goalscorer(s)	Gls	Best player	Best goalkeeper	Fair play	Ref.
(United Arab Emirates) 2006	(Japan) Takeshi Kawaharazuka	9	(Bahrain) Abdullah Omar	(Iran) Hamed Ghorbanpour	not awarded	
(United Arab Emirates) 2007	(Iran) Farid Boulokbashi		(United Arab Emirates) Bakhit Alabadla	(United Arab Emirates) Mohamed Al Mazam	not awarded	
(United Arab Emirates) 2008	(Japan) Shusei Yamauchi	12	(United Arab Emirates) Rami Al Mesaabi	(Japan) Shingo Terukina	not awarded	
(United Arab Emirates) 2009	(Iran) Moslem Mesigar		(Bahrain) Yaqoob Al Nesuf	(Japan) Tomoya Ginoza	not awarded	
(Oman) 2011	(Japan) Takeshi Kawaharazuka (Oman) Ishaq Al-Qassmi	8	(Oman) Yahya Al Araimi	(Japan) Shingo Terukina	not awarded	
(Qatar) 2013	(Iran) Moslem Mesigar	11	(Japan) Ozu Moreira	(Australia) Simon Jaeger	not awarded	
(Qatar) 2015	(Japan) Takasuke Goto	8	(Japan) Ozu Moreira	(Iran) Peyman Hosseini	not awarded	
(Malaysia) 2017	(Iran) Mohammadali Mokhtari	12	(Iran) Mohammadali Mokhtari	not awarded (Note: In 2017 and 2019, the "best goalkeeper" was not awarded. However, the goalkeepers chosen for the "dream team" of the tournament may be considered as the de facto best goalkeepers for these years.)	Iran	
(Thailand) 2019	(Japan) Ozu Moreira	9	(Japan) Ozu Moreira	not awarded	United Arab Emirates	
(Thailand) 2023	(Japan) Takuya Akaguma	11	(Iran) Moslem Mesigar	(Iran) Mahdi Mirjalili	Oman	
(Thailand) 2025	(Iran) Ali Mirshekari	12	(Iran) Ali Mirshekari	(Iran) Mahdi Mirjalili	Japan	

=== By nationality ===
Rank	Team	Awards
1	Iran	13
1	Japan	13
3	United Arab Emirates	4
4	Oman	3
5	Bahrain	2
6	Australia	1

== Team of the tournament ==
Since 2017, the competition's Technical Study Group have produced a post-tournament report including a dream and reserve "team of the tournament".

Year	Dream team	Reserve team	Ref.
(Malaysia) 2017	(Japan) Shingo Terukina (GK) (Japan) Ozu Moreira (DF) (United Arab Emirates) Ahmed Beshr (DF) (Iran) Mohammad Ahmadzadeh (FW) (Iran) Mohammadali Mokhtari (FW)	(Iran) Peyman Hosseini (GK) (Iran) Hassan Abdollahi (DF) (United Arab Emirates) Ali Karim (MF) (Japan) Takaaki Oba (MF) (Lebanon) Mohamad Merhi (FW)	
(Thailand) 2019	(United Arab Emirates) Mohamed Abdulla (GK) (Japan) Ozu Moreira (DF) (United Arab Emirates) Waleed Beshr (DF) (Oman) Yahya Abyoua (FW) (Japan) Shusei Yamauchi (FW)	(Japan) Shingo Terukina (GK) (Palestine) Maisara Alawwab (DF) (Oman) Mushel Hilal (DF) (United Arab Emirates) Walid Mohammad (DF) (Japan) Takuya Akaguma (FW)	
(Thailand) 2023	(Iran) Mahdi Mirjalili (GK) (Japan) Ozu Moreira (DF) (Iran) Moslem Mesigar (FW) (Japan) Takuya Akaguma (FW) (Oman) Khalid Al Oraimi (FW)	(Japan) Shinya Shibamoto (GK) (United Arab Emirates) Ali Mohammadi (DF) (Iran) Mohammadali Mokhtari (FW) (Oman) Sami Al Balushi (FW) (Iran) Ali Mirshekari (FW)	
(Thailand) 2025	(Iran) Mahdi Mirjalili (GK) (Japan) Ozu Moreira (DF) (Saudi Arabia) Majed Shamhani (DF) (Iran) Ali Mirshekari (FW) (Oman) Yahya Al Muraiki (FW)	not named	

== Appearances and performance timeline ==
The following is a performance timeline of the teams who have appeared in the AFC Beach Soccer Championship and how many appearances they each have made.

Legend

- 1st – Champions
- 2nd – Runners-up
- 3rd – Third place
- 4th – Fourth place
- 5th–16th – Fifth to sixteenth place
- Q – Qualified for upcoming tournament
- × – Did not enter
- •• – Entered but withdrew
- – Hosts
- Apps – No. of appearances

Timeline

Year Team	2006 (United Arab Emirates) (6)	2007 (United Arab Emirates) (6)	2008 (United Arab Emirates) (6)	2009 (United Arab Emirates) (7)	2011 (Oman) (11)	2013 (Qatar) (16)	2015 (Qatar) (14)	2017 (Malaysia) (12)	2019 (Thailand) (15)	2023 (Thailand) (16)	2025 (Thailand) (16)	2026 (Thailand) (12)	Apps
Afghanistan	×	×	×	×	••	11th	×	6th	12th	13th	16th		5
Australia	×	×	×	5th	×	4th	×	×	×	×	×		2
Bahrain	1st	4th	×	2nd	6th	9th	7th	5th	6th	6th	8th		10
China	4th	5th	4th	7th	5th	7th	6th	12th	9th	7th	12th		11
India	×	6th	×	×	×	×	×	×	×	×	15th		2
Indonesia	×	×	×	×	11th	×	×	×	×	16th	11th		3
Iran	3rd	3rd	3rd	4th	3rd	1st	3rd	1st	7th	1st	1st		11
Iraq	×	×	×	×	9th	10th	12th	9th	13th	×	14th		6
Japan	2nd	2nd	2nd	1st	1st	2nd	2nd	3rd	1st	2nd	3rd		11
Kuwait	×	×	×	×	10th	×	9th	×	11th	8th	9th		5
Kyrgyzstan	×	×	×	×	×	×	×	×	15th	14th	×		2
Laos	×	×	×	×	×	×	10th	×	×	×	×		1
Lebanon	×	×	×	×	×	8th	4th	4th	5th	10th	7th		6
Malaysia	×	×	×	×	×	×	×	8th	8th	15th	10th		4
Oman	×	×	×	3rd	2nd	5th	1st	7th	3rd	3rd	2nd		8
Palestine	×	×	×	×	••	6th	••	×	4th	11th	×		3
Philippines	6th	×	6th	×	×	16th	×	×	×	×	×		3
Qatar	×	×	×	×	••	15th	14th	11th	14th	×	×		4
Saudi Arabia	×	×	×	×	×	12th	×	×	×	9th	4th		3
Syria	×	×	×	×	8th	×	×	×	×	×	×		1
Thailand	×	×	×	×	×	13th	13th	10th	10th	5th	5th		6
United Arab Emirates	5th	1st	1st	×	4th	3rd	5th	2nd	2nd	4th	6th		10
Uzbekistan	×	×	5th	6th	7th	14th	8th	••	×	12th	×		6
Vietnam	×	×	×	×	×	×	11th	×	×	×	13th		2

== Performance of qualifiers at the World Cup ==
The following is a performance timeline of the AFC teams who have appeared in the Beach Soccer World Cup since being sanctioned by FIFA in 2005.

Legend

- 1st – Champions
- 2nd – Runners-up
- 3rd – Third place
- 4th – Fourth place
- – Hosts
- QF – Quarter-finals
- R1 – Round 1 (group stage)
- q – Qualified for upcoming tournament
- Total – Total times qualified for World Cup

Team \ Years	(Brazil) 2005	(Brazil) 2006	(Brazil) 2007	(France) 2008	(United Arab Emirates) 2009	(Italy) 2011	(French Polynesia) 2013	(Portugal) 2015	(The Bahamas) 2017	(Paraguay) 2019	(Russia) 2021	(United Arab Emirates) 2023	(Seychelles) 2025	Total
Bahrain		QF			R1									2
Iran		R1	R1	R1		R1	QF	QF	3rd			3rd	QF	9
Japan	4th	QF	R1	R1	QF	R1	QF	QF	R1	4th	2nd	QF	QF	13
Oman						R1		R1		R1	R1	R1	R1	6
Thailand	R1													1
United Arab Emirates			R1	R1	R1		R1		R1	R1	R1	QF		8

Notes

1. In 2005 and 2021, no AFC qualifiers for the FIFA Beach Soccer World Cup were held and teams were selected to represent AFC (2005: Japan and Thailand; 2021: Japan, Oman and United Arab Emirates).

== See also ==
- Beach soccer at the Asian Beach Games
- AFF Beach Soccer Championship
- WAFF Beach Soccer Championship
- AFC Futsal Asian Cup
