= 2016 Continental Beach Soccer Tournament =

2016 Continental Beach Soccer Tournament (AFC)

Tournament details
- Host country: China
- City: Ordos
- Dates: 23–25 August 2016
- Teams: 8 (from 1 confederation)
- Venue(s): 1 (in 1 host city)

Final positions
- Champions: Iran (1st title)
- Runners-up: Oman
- Third place: Japan
- Fourth place: Vietnam

Tournament statistics
- Matches played: 12
- Goals scored: 100 (8.33 per match)
- Top scorer(s): (Iran) Amir Akhbari
- Best player(s): (Iran) Amir Akhbari
- Best goalkeeper: (Iran) Seyed Peyman Hosseini

The 2016 Continental Beach Soccer Tournament was a beach soccer tournament which took place in Ordos, China on 23–25 August 2016. This was the first time an international tournament was being held in Northern China. All matches were played at the Ordos. Iran won the tournament.

== Participating teams ==
The following 8 teams entered the tournament.

- Bahrain
- China(hosts)
- Iran
- Japan
- Lebanon
- Oman
- Thailand
- Vietnam

== Results ==
Fifth place
Thailand	5
China	1

Consolation semifinals
Bahrain	2
Thailand	3
China (p)	2(3)
Lebanon	2(1)

Quarterfinals
Iran	10
Bahrain	1
Japan	12
Thailand	4
China	2
Vietnam	5
Oman (a.e.t.)	2
Lebanon	1

Semifinals
Iran	5
Japan	1
Vietnam	3
Oman	7

Final
Iran	6
Oman	3

Rank	Team
1st place, gold medalist(s)	Iran
2nd place, silver medalist(s)	Oman
3rd place, bronze medalist(s)	Japan
4	Vietnam
5	Thailand
6	China
7	Bahrain
8	Lebanon
