= Continental Beach Soccer Tournament =

- Founded: 2016
- Region: Asia AFC
- Number of teams: 8
- Current champions: Iran
- Most successful team(s): Iran (1st title)
- 2016 Continental Beach Soccer Tournament

The Continental Beach Soccer Tournament is a beach soccer tournament contested between top ranked Asian teams who are invited to participate. The first edition was held in Ordos, China, in 2016.

== Summaries ==
| Year | Host | Final | | | Third Place Match |
| Year | Host | Champion | Score | Runner-up | Third Place | Score | Fourth Place |
|---|---|---|---|---|---|---|---|
| 2016; Details | Ordos, China | Iran | 6–3 | Oman | Japan | 8–4 | Vietnam |

=== Overall standings ===
As 2016

| Pos | Team | Part | Pld | W | WE | WP | L | GF | GA | Dif | Pts |
|---|---|---|---|---|---|---|---|---|---|---|---|
| 1 | Iran | 1 | 3 | 3 | 0 | 0 | 0 | 21 | 5 | +16 | 9 |
| 2 | Japan | 1 | 3 | 2 | 0 | 0 | 1 | 21 | 13 | +8 | 6 |
| 3 | Thailand | 1 | 3 | 2 | 0 | 0 | 1 | 12 | 15 | −3 | 6 |
| 4 | Oman | 1 | 3 | 1 | 1 | 0 | 1 | 12 | 10 | +2 | 5 |
| 5 | Vietnam | 1 | 3 | 1 | 0 | 0 | 2 | 12 | 17 | −5 | 3 |
| 6 | Bahrain | 1 | 3 | 1 | 0 | 0 | 2 | 7 | 16 | −9 | 3 |
| 7 | China | 1 | 3 | 0 | 0 | 1 | 2 | 5 | 12 | −7 | 1 |
| 8 | Lebanon | 1 | 3 | 0 | 0 | 0 | 3 | 6 | 8 | −2 | 0 |

Note: Win in Common Time W = 3 Points / Win in Extra Time WE = 2 Points / Win in Penalty shoot-out WP = 1 Point / Lose L = 0 Points
