= Marco Octávio =

Brazilian beach soccer coach

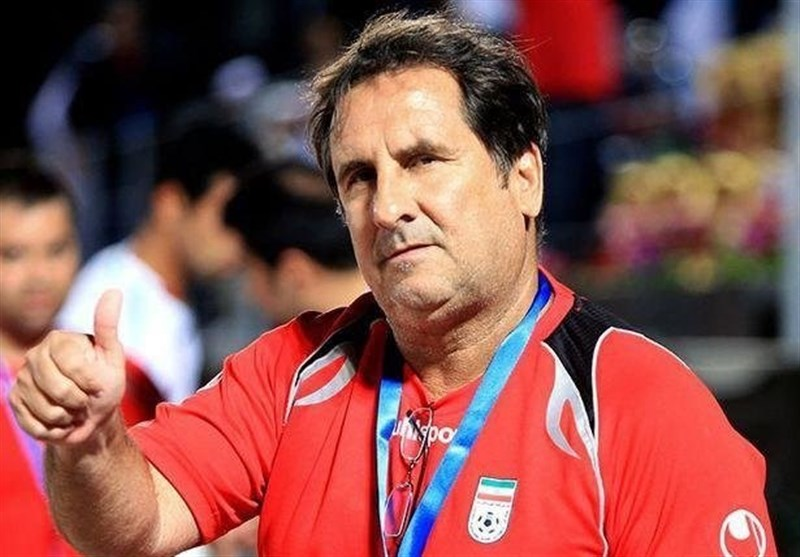
Image of Marco Octávio

Marco Octávio Simoes Barbosa (or simply Marco Octavio) is a Brazilian beach soccer and football coach. He was the head coach of the Iran national beach soccer team.

Octávio guided Brazil to four BSWW Mundialito titles, which remains a record.

His coaching ability did not go unnoticed in Asia and he was given a job in United Arab Emirates before assuming the Chinese controls in 2006. He masterminded China's rebuilding process and did take the East Asians to the level where they were capable to compete against the continent's best.

Octávio has also coached professional clubs, including Bahia and Shirin Faraz. He has qualified Iran to the 2015 FIFA Beach Soccer World Cup.

== Career ==
- Brazil national beach soccer team
- Portugal national beach soccer team
- United Arab Emirates national beach soccer team
- China national beach soccer team
- (Brazil) Esporte Clube Bahia (2003–2004)
- Iran national beach soccer team (2007)
- (Iran) Shirin Faraz (2007–2008)
- Iran national beach soccer team (2010)
- Iran national beach soccer team (2012–2015)
- Iran national beach soccer team (2017–2019)
