= WAFF Beach Soccer Championship =

- Founded: 2013
- Region: West Asia (WAFF)
- Number of teams: 7
- Current champions: United Arab Emirates
- Most successful team(s): Iran; United Arab Emirates (1 title each)
- 2022 WAFF Beach Soccer Championship

The WAFF Beach Soccer Championship is an international beach soccer competition contested by West Asian men's national teams who are members of the West Asian Football Federation (WAFF).

First held in 2013, the inaugural event is the only edition to have been held thus far. However, in 2021, WAFF announced a second edition would take place with a view to making the championship an annual occurrence.

== Results ==
Editions	Years	Hosts	Finals			Third place playoff			Number of teams
Editions	Years	Hosts	Winners	Scores	Runners-up	Third place	Score	Fourth place	Number of teams
1	2013; Details	Iran	Iran	3–3(aet) (1–0 p)	Oman	Palestine	4–3	Bahrain	7
2	2022; Details	Saudi Arabia	United Arab Emirates	3–2	Oman	Bahrain	5–2	Palestine	7

== See also ==
- AFC Beach Soccer Asian Cup
- AFF Beach Soccer Championship
- WAFF Futsal Championship
