= Mahdi Mirjalili =

Iranian beach soccer player

Personal information
- Full name: Seyed Mahdi Mirjalili
- Date of birth: 5 July 1999 (age 27)
- Place of birth: Yazd, Iran
- Height: 1.87 m (6 ft 2 in)
- Position: Goalkeeper

Team information
- Current team: Chadormalou Ardakan S.C. (beach soccer)
- Number: 1

Senior career*
Years	Team	Apps	(Gls)
2018-2022	Golsapoosh	50	(13)
2023	Krylia	14	(4)
2023	Foolad Hormozgan	13	(6)
2023–	Chadormalou Ardakan	43	(8)

International career
	Iran (beach soccer)	49	(16)
Medal record
Representing Iran
Men's beach soccer
FIFA Beach Soccer World Cup
Bronze medal – third place	2024 Dubai
Intercontinental Cup
Gold medal – first place	2023 Dubai
Asian Championship
Gold medal – first place	2023 Pattaya
Gold medal – first place	2025 Pattaya
Asian Beach Games
Gold medal – first place	2026 Sanya
- * Club domestic league appearances and goals

Seyed Mahdi Mirjalili (Persian: سید مهدی میرجلیلی; born 5 July 1999 in Yazd) is an Iranian beach soccer player who represents the Iran national beach soccer team as a goalkeeper. He was named the best goalkeeper in Asia in 2023 and 2025, receiving the Golden Glove award on both occasions.

For the 2025–26 season, the World Beach Soccer Organization appointed Mirjalili as a global ambassador of the organization.

== Honours ==
=== Beach soccer ===
- Iran
  - FIFA Beach Soccer World Cup Third place: 2024 Dubai
  - Beach Soccer Intercontinental Cup winner: 2023 Dubai
  - Asian Championship winner : 2023 Pattaya, 2025 Pattaya
  - Asian Beach Games gold medal : 2026 Sanya
