= Farshad Falahatzadeh =

Iranian footballer and manager

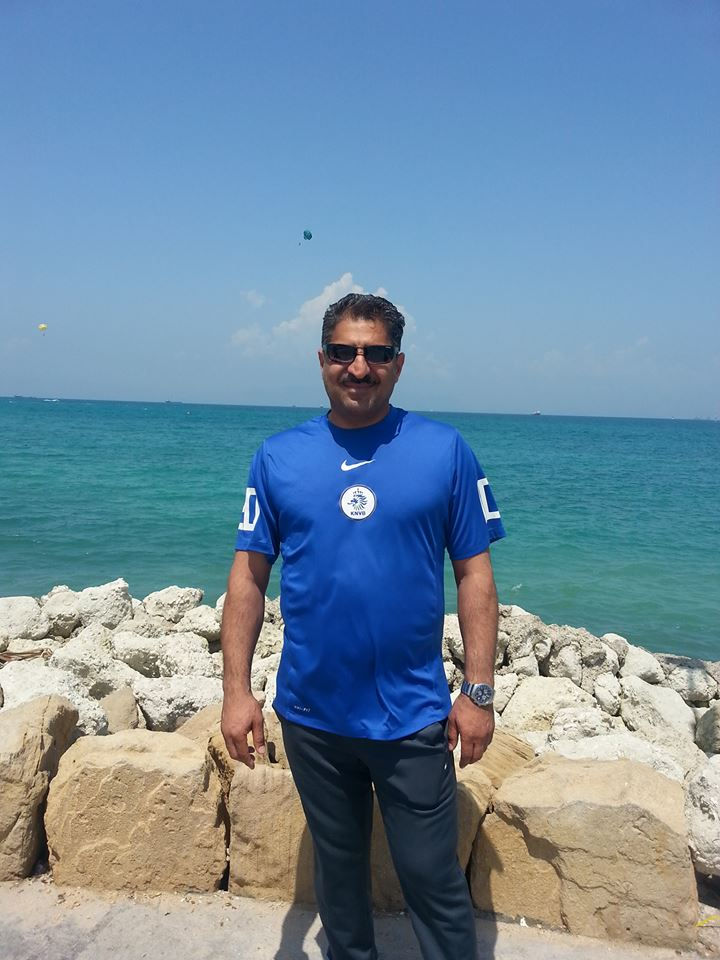

Personal information
- Full name: Farshad Falahatzadeh
- Date of birth: March 21, 1967 (age 59)
- Place of birth: Tehran, Iran
- Position: Defender

Team information
- Current team: Saipa (assistant coach)

Senior career*
Years	Team	Apps	(Gls)
1987–1994	Esteghlal		
1994–1996	Saipa		
1996–1997	Bargh Shiraz		
1997–1999	Bahman		
1999–2000	FSV Mainz 05		
2000–2001	Esteghlal		
2001–2002	Sanat Naft		
2002–2003	Bargh Shiraz		

International career
1993–1998	Iran	11	(0)
2006	Iran beach		

Managerial career
- 2006–2008: Iran beach
- 2009: Damash Gilan (assistant)
- 2009–2010: Damash Tehran (assistant)
- 2010: Damash Karaj
- 2015: Malavan (assistant)
- 2015–2016: Niroo Zamini
- 2016–: Saipa (assistant)
- * Club domestic league appearances and goals

Farshad Falahatzadeh (Persian: فرشاد فلاحت‌زاده; born March 21, 1967) is a retired Iranian football player and he is now a manager. He was a defender for a number of clubs, most notably Esteghlal as well as Iran national football team with at least 25 plays.

== Club career ==
He played for Esteghlal, Saipa Tehran, Bahman, 1. FSV Mainz 05, Sanat Naft, and Bargh Shiraz.

== International career ==
He played for the Iran national team at the 1994 & 1998 World Cup France Qualification rounds, ECO Cup 1993, 1994 Asian Games, 1996 Asian Cup and Asia champion with Esteghlal 1990 and 1998 Carlsberg Cup (Friendly Tournament) and 2006 FIFA Beach Soccer World Cup.

== Coaching career ==
He was captain and coach of the Iran national beach soccer team at the 2006 FIFA Beach Soccer World Cup and Head Coach at 2008 and 2010 FIFA Beach Soccer World Cup. He was a co-trainer for Damash Gilan in 2012, head trainer for Shahrdari Arak in 2013, and manager for Esteghlal Academi in 2014.
