= Persian Beach Soccer Cup =

- Organiser(s): BSWW
- Founded: 2017
- Region: International (FIFA)
- Teams: 4
- Current champions: Iran (2nd title)
- Most championships: Iran (2 titles)
- 2018 Persian Beach Soccer Cup

The Persian Beach Soccer Cup is an international beach soccer tournament which is held in Bushehr, Iran. The invitation-only tournament has been held annually since the inaugural edition in 2017.

== Results ==
Year	Location	Winners	Runners-up	Third place	Fourth place	Number of teams	Best player	Top goalscorer(s)	Best goalkeeper	Goals scored (avg. per game)
2017; Details	Bushehr, Iran	Iran	Ukraine	Italy	Poland	4	Amir Hossein Akbari (IRN)	5 goals Gabriele Gori (ITA)	Volodymyr Hladchenko (UKR)	42 (7)
2018; Details	Bushehr, Iran	Iran	Spain	Ukraine	Azerbaijan	4	Mohammad Moradi (IRN)	5 goals Mohammadali Ahmadzadeh (IRN); Llorenc Gomez (ESP); Oleg Zborovskyi (UKR)	Francisco Donaire (ESP)	39 (6.5)

== Performance by team ==
=== Successful teams ===
Nation	Winners	Runners-up	Third place	Fourth place
Iran	2 (2017, 2018)			
Ukraine		1 (2017)	1 (2018)	
Spain		1 (2018)		
Italy			1 (2017)	
Azerbaijan				1 (2018)
Poland				1 (2017)

=== Success by confederation ===
Total times teams played by confederation
	AFC	CAF	CONCACAF	CONMEBOL	OFC	UEFA	Total
Teams	2	0	0	0	0	5	7
Top 2	2	0	0	0	0	2	4
1st	2	0	0	0	0	0	2
2nd	0	0	0	0	0	2	2
3rd	0	0	0	0	0	2	2
4th	0	0	0	0	0	2	2

=== Overall standings ===
As of 2018

Pos	Team	App	Pld	W	W+	L	GF	GA	GD	Pts	Avg. Pts
1	Iran	2	6	5	1	0	23	15	+8	16	2.67
2	Spain	1	3	2	0	1	11	7	+4	6	2
3	Ukraine	2	6	2	0	4	22	27	-5	6	1
4	Italy	1	3	1	0	2	12	13	-1	3	1
5	Poland	1	3	1	0	2	7	9	-2	3	1
6	Azerbaijan	1	3	0	0	3	6	10	-4	0	0

== Results ==
=== 2017 ===
1. Italy 7-6 Ukraine
2. Iran 3-2 Poland
3. Poland 3-2 Italy
4. Iran 3-3 Ukraine 8-7 pens
5. Ukraine 4-2 Poland
6. Iran 4-3 Italy

=== 2018 ===
1. Spain 6-2 Ukraine
2. Iran 3-2 Azerbaijan
3. Spain 3-1 Azerbaijan
4. Iran 6-3 Ukraine
5. Ukraine 4-3 Azerbaijan
6. Iran 4-2 Spain
