= Abdulla Saleh =

Bahraini footballer

Abdulla Saleh Aman (born 1970) is a Bahraini international footballer who plays for Busaiteen and Bahrain national football team.

== International goals ==
Scores and results list Bahrain's goal tally first.

#	Date	Venue	Opponent	Score	Result	Competition
1.	15 October 2013	Shah Alam Stadium, Shah Alam, Malaysia	Malaysia	1–0	1–1	2015 AFC Asian Cup qualification
