= Beach soccer at the 2026 Asian Beach Games =

- Venue: Yuhai Club
- Dates: 23–29 April 2026

Beach soccer competition at the 2026 Asian Beach Games was held at the Yuhai Road Beach in Sanya, China from 22 to 30 April 2026.

Only a men's tournament was held after the women's counterpart was cancelled due to insufficient number of teams. The draw was held on 18 March 2026.

== Medalists ==
Event	Gold	Silver	Bronze
Men	Iran; Mehdi Mirjalili; Reza Dayyeri; Davoud Shokri; Saeid Piramoun; Ali Nazem; Mehdi Shirmohammadi; Ali Mirshekari; Movahed Mohammadpour; Mohammad Ali Mokhtari; Mohammad Ali Nazarzadeh; Mohammad Masoumizadeh; Mohammad Dastan	Oman; Majid Al-Affari; Abdullah Al-Sauti; Musallam Al-Araimi; Ahmed Al-Owaisi; Khalfan Al-Ghazali; Abdulrahman Al-Fazari; Al-Yaqdhan Al-Hindasi; Fahad Al-Mesheikhi; Sami Al-Bulushi; Khalid Al-Araimi; Salim Al-Araimi; Younis Al-Owaisi	Saudi Arabia; Mohammed Al-Ajmi; Hassan Al-Eid; Omar Kark; Ahmed Al-Hamami; Rabyi Sufyani; Munthir Magshi; Ramzi Dakman; Waleed Al-Youbi; Majed Shamhani; Khalid Mofareh; Naif Yakl; Fahad Al-Masabi

== Results ==
=== First round ===
==== Group A ====
Pos	Team	Pld	W	WE	WP	L	GF	GA	GD	Pts
1	Oman	2	2	0	0	0	11	3	+8	6
2	Palestine	2	1	0	0	1	6	10	−4	3
3	China	2	0	0	0	2	4	8	−4	0

Source: Official website
23 April 2026
21:00

Oman	7–2	Palestine
M. Al-Araimi 6'; Al-Sauti 13', 15', 26'; Al-Affari 23'; K. Al-Araimi 23'; Al-Bulushi 34'	Report	Atiya 13', 25'

Yuhai Club, Sanya
Referee: Suparith Udma (Thailand)

25 April 2026
16:30

Palestine	4–3	China
Al-Hawajri 8'; Abuobayda 21', 30'; Atiya 26'	Report	Gou Yongmin 22'; Tan Fanglun 24'; Cui Zhiyao 27'

Yuhai Club, Sanya
Referee: Mehran Khalili (Iran)

26 April 2026
21:00

China	1–4	Oman
Xie Zijing 30'	Report	Al-Sauti 7'; Al-Mesheikhi 11'; K. Al-Araimi 24'; M. Al-Araimi 36'

Yuhai Club, Sanya
Referee: Hassan Abed Rabbo (Lebanon)

==== Group B ====
Pos	Team	Pld	W	WE	WP	L	GF	GA	GD	Pts
1	Iran	3	3	0	0	0	20	4	+16	9
2	Saudi Arabia	3	2	0	0	1	17	10	+7	6
3	United Arab Emirates	3	1	0	0	2	10	16	−6	3
4	Thailand	3	0	0	0	3	8	25	−17	0

Source: Official website
23 April 2026
16:00

Iran	5–2	United Arab Emirates
Mohammadpour 6', 10'; Masoumizadeh 17', 32'; Mirshekari 19'	Report	A. Salem 9' (pen.); A. Al-Blooshi 26'

Yuhai Club, Sanya
Referee: Li Qibin (China)

23 April 2026
18:30

Saudi Arabia	8–4	Thailand
Shamhani 2', 11'; Yakl 20'; Kark 20'; Mofareh 22', 33'; Dakman 26', 32'	Report	Yoshida 3'; Stoten 11', 18'; Al-Hamami 28' (o.g.)

Yuhai Club, Sanya
Referee: Amirul Aizat Lodin (Malaysia)

25 April 2026
11:00

United Arab Emirates	4–8	Saudi Arabia
W. Salem 4', 17'; A. Al-Blooshi 5', 31'	Report	Kark 1', 26'; Shamhani 4', 4'; Dakman 11'; Mofareh 14'; Yakl 33', 33'

Yuhai Club, Sanya
Referee: Nayim Kosimov (Uzbekistan)

25 April 2026
13:30

Thailand	1–13	Iran
Jeepon 25'	Report	Dastan 2'; Nazarzadeh 4', 20', 34'; Masoumizadeh 6', 13'; Mirjalili 8'; Shokri 10', 16'; Mohammadpour 14'; Nazem 15'; Mokhtari 25'; Shirmohammadi 32'

Yuhai Club, Sanya
Referee: Zukri Al-Hinai (Oman)

26 April 2026
16:00

Iran	2–1	Saudi Arabia
Mirshekari 25'; Dayyeri 27'	Report	Al-Hamami 25'

Yuhai Club, Sanya
Referee: Syahir Shaharul Nizam (Malaysia)

26 April 2026
18:30

Thailand	3–4	United Arab Emirates
Stoten 22'; Lepaijit 26', 32'	Report	Yaqoub 14'; W. Salem 16', 22'; A. Al-Blooshi 26'

Yuhai Club, Sanya
Referee: Akram Mahdi (Iraq)

=== Knockout round ===
Semifinals
27 April
Iran	9
Palestine	1
27 April
Oman (a.e.t.)	5
Saudi Arabia	4

Gold medal match
29 April
Iran	6
Oman	2
Bronze medal match
29 April
Palestine	4
Saudi Arabia (a.e.t.)	6

==== Semifinals ====
27 April 2026
18:00

Oman	5–4 (a.e.t.)	Saudi Arabia
Al-Bulushi 8', 24', 37'; Al-Sauti 25'; K. Al-Araimi 33'	Report	Al-Ajmi 7'; Yakl 31'; Al-Hamami 34', 36'

Yuhai Club, Sanya
Referee: Nawaf Hussein (United Arab Emirates)

27 April 2026
20:30

Iran	9–1	Palestine
Mokhtari 1', 28', 36'; Masoumizadeh 3', 29'; Shirmohammadi 5', 28'; Mohammadpour 15'; Shokri 31'	Report	Abuobayda 31'

Yuhai Club, Sanya
Referee: Timur Gulmyradow (Turkmenistan)

==== Bronze medal match ====
29 April 2026
18:00

Palestine	4–6 (a.e.t.)	Saudi Arabia
Fahjan 6'; Atiya 27'; Abuobayda 30'; Obaid 32'	Report	Shamhani 3'; Shbair 14' (o.g.); Yakl 20'; Al-Hamami 27'; Mofareh 38'; Abuobayda 39' (o.g.)

Yuhai Club, Sanya
Referee: Zukri Al-Hinai (Oman)

==== Gold medal match ====
29 April 2026
20:30

Iran	6–2	Oman
Mokhtari 1'; Shokri 12', 29'; Mohammadpour 12', 16'; Mirshekari 32'	Report	Al-Sauti 13'; Al-Bulushi 34'

Yuhai Club, Sanya
Referee: Abdulaziz Abdullah (Kuwait)

== Goalscorers ==
6 goals

- Mohammad Masoumizadeh (IRI)
- Movahed Mohammadpour (IRI)
- Abdullah Al-Sauti (OMA)

5 goals

- Mohammad Ali Mokhtari (IRI)
- Davoud Shokri (IRI)
- Majed Shamhani (KSA)
- Naif Yakl (KSA)
- Sami Al-Bulushi (OMA)

4 goals

- Ahmed Al-Hamami (KSA)
- Khalid Mofareh (KSA)
- Thaer Abuobayda (PLE)
- Alaa Atiya (PLE)
- Abdulla Al-Blooshi (UAE)
- Waleed Beshr Salem (UAE)

3 goals

- Ali Mirshekari (IRI)
- Mohammad Ali Nazarzadeh (IRI)
- Mehdi Shirmohammadi (IRI)
- Ramzi Dakman (KSA)
- Omar Kark (KSA)
- Khalid Al-Araimi (OMA)
- Jake Stoten (THA)

2 goals

- Musallam Al-Araimi (OMA)
- Watchara Lepaijit (THA)

1 goal

- Cui Zhiyao (CHN)
- Gou Yongmin (CHN)
- Tan Fanglun (CHN)
- Xie Zijing (CHN)
- Mohammad Dastan (IRI)
- Reza Dayyeri (IRI)
- Mehdi Mirjalili (IRI)
- Ali Nazem (IRI)
- Mohammed Al-Ajmi (KSA)
- Majid Al-Affari (OMA)
- Fahad Al-Mesheikhi (OMA)
- Ali Al-Hawajri (PLE)
- Imad Fahjan (PLE)
- Sadeq Obaid (PLE)
- Natee Jeepon (THA)
- Masayuki Yoshida (THA)
- Ahmed Beshr Salem (UAE)
- Rashed Eid Yaqoub (UAE)

1 own goal

- Thaer Abuobayda (PLE) (against KSA)
- Mohammed Shbair (PLE) (against KSA)
- Ahmed Al-Hamami (KSA) (against THA)
