= 2019 Neom Beach Soccer Cup =

Tournament details
- Host country: Saudi Arabia
- City: Neom
- Dates: 17–20 July 2019
- Teams: 6

Final positions
- Champions: Oman

The 2019 Neom Beach Soccer Cup was first ever Neom Beach Soccer Cup (part of 1st Neom Beach Games) an international beach soccer tournament approved by the FIFA and held in the Saudi Arabia’s city of Neom from 17 to 20 July 2019 in beaches of the Red Sea coast.

== Teams ==
There are six teams are participating in the tournament; England, China, Egypt, UAE, Oman and Saudi Arabia. It is separated into two groups as follows:

Group	Team
A	Saudi Arabia against China and Egypt
B	England against UAE and Oman

The winner of each group will meet in the final to contest the title of the tournament, while the second of each group will meet for the third, and the third of each group will play for the fifth place.

== Results ==
=== Men ===
Source: Beach Soccer, Neom Beach Soccer Cup 2019

Group A
July 17, 2019	19:45	KSA	6–5	CHN
July 18, 2019	19:45	EGY	7–0	CHN
July 19, 2019	19:45	KSA	2–4	EGY

Group B
July 17, 2019	18:30	UAE	4–1	ENG
July 18, 2019	18:30	OMA	6–4	UAE
July 19, 2019	18:30	OMA	3–0	ENG

On 20 July 2019, Oman and Egypt played the final match. With the final result of 5–4, Oman won the first edition of the 2019 NEOM Beach Soccer Cup.

== Neom Beach Soccer Cup ==
=== Men ===
2019:Oman,Egypt,United Arab Emirates,Saudi Arabia,England,China

2022:Brazil,Paraguay,Oman,United Arab Emirates,Japan,England,Bahrain,Saudi Arabia

2023:Brazil,Japan,United Arab Emirates,Germany,England,Spain,Saudi Arabia,Turkey

=== Women ===
2022:Brazil,England,Netherlands,Ukraine

2023:Spain,Brazil,Czech Republic

== Neom Beach Games ==
1. 2022 Neom Beach Games - 5 Sports - Kitesurfing, triathlon, 3x3 basketball, beach soccer and mountain biking events - 25 countries compete.
2. 2023 Neom Beach Games - 5 Sports - triathlon, beach soccer, 3x3 basketball, biking, and climbing.
3. 2024 Neom Beach Games - 5 Sports

== See also ==
- Neom Beach Soccer Cup
- Arab Beach Soccer Cup
