= Iran national beach soccer team =

Iran ایران
- Nickname(s): Team Melli Football Saheli (Persian: تیم ملی فوتبال ساحلی , شیران ساحل) "The National Beach Football Team"
- Association: FFIRI
- Confederation: AFC
- Head coach: Ali Naderi
- Captain: Mohammad Ali Mokhtari
- Home stadium: Takhti Sport Complex
- FIFA code: IRN
- BSWW ranking: 6
First colours
Second colours

First international
- Iran 3–7 Japan (Dubai; 23 May 2006)

Biggest win
- Iran 20–0 Philippines (Doha; 22 January 2013)

Biggest defeat
- Iran 2–7 Bahrain (Dubai; 25 May 2006)

World Cup
- Appearances: 9 (first in 2006)
- Best result: (bronze) Third place (2017 and 2024)

AFC Beach Soccer Championship
- Appearances: 12 (first in 2006)
- Best result: (gold) Champions (2013, 2017, 2023, 2025)

Beach Soccer Intercontinental Cup
- Appearances: 9 (first in 2013)
- Best result: Champions (2013, 2018, 2019, 2022)

The Iran national beach soccer team (Persian: تیم ملی فوتبال ساحلی) represents Iran in international beach soccer competitions and is controlled by the IFF, the governing body for football in Iran.

Iran has won the AFC Beach Soccer Championship four times (2013, 2017, 2023,2025). Iran has also appeared in the FIFA Beach Soccer World Cup seven times, reaching the quarterfinals on three occasions (2013, 2015, 2017), and finishing in third place twice (2017, 2024).

== Team ==
=== Current squad ===
Correct as of 26-February-2024

Note: Flags indicate national team as defined under FIFA eligibility rules; some limited exceptions apply. Players may hold more than one non-FIFA nationality.

| No. | Pos. | Nation | Player |
|---|---|---|---|
| 1 | GK | | Hamid Behzadpour |
| 2 | DF | | Amir Hossein Akbari |
| 3 | DF | | Reza Amirizadeh |
| 4 | DF | | Saeed Piramoon |
| 5 | FW | | Mohammad Moradi |
| 6 | FW | | Mahdi Shir Mohammadi |

| No. | Pos. | Nation | Player |
|---|---|---|---|
| 7 | FW | | Ali Mirshekari |
| 8 | DF | | Movahed Mohammadpour |
| 9 | FW | | Mohammad Ali Mokhtari |
| 10 | FW | | Moslem Mesigar |
| 11 | FW | | Mohammad Masoumizadeh |
| 12 | GK | | Seyed Mahdi Mirjalili |

Coach: Ali Naderi Hoseinabadi

== Fixtures and results ==
Win Loss

Matches
| Date | Competition | Location | Opponent | Result |

== Tournament record ==
Agenda (Points): W = 3 / WE = 2 / WP = 1 / L = 0

=== FIFA Beach Soccer World Cup ===
| FIFA World Cup | | | | | | | | | | | Qualification | | | | | | | | |
| Year | Round | M | W | WE | WP | L | GF | GA | GD | Points | M | W | WE | WP | L | GF | GA | GD | Points |
|---|---|---|---|---|---|---|---|---|---|---|---|---|---|---|---|---|---|---|---|
| (Brazil) 2005 | Did not enter | | | | | | | | | | Did not enter * | | | | | | | | |
| (Brazil) 2006 | Round 1 | 3 | 0 | 0 | 0 | 3 | 10 | 18 | –8 | 0 | 2006 AFC Beach Soccer Championship | | | | | | | | |
| (Brazil) 2007 | Round 1 | 3 | 1 | 0 | 0 | 2 | 14 | 14 | 0 | 3 | 2007 AFC Beach Soccer Championship | | | | | | | | |
| (France) 2008 | Round 1 | 3 | 0 | 0 | 0 | 3 | 8 | 16 | –8 | 0 | 2008 AFC Beach Soccer Championship | | | | | | | | |
| (United Arab Emirates) 2009 | Did not qualify | | | | | | | | | | 2009 AFC Beach Soccer Championship | | | | | | | | |
| (Italy) 2011 | Round 1 | 3 | 0 | 0 | 0 | 3 | 13 | 17 | –4 | 0 | 2011 AFC Beach Soccer Championship | | | | | | | | |
| (French Polynesia) 2013 | Quarterfinals | 4 | 1 | 0 | 0 | 3 | 13 | 16 | –3 | 3 | 2013 AFC Beach Soccer Championship | | | | | | | | |
| (Portugal) 2015 | Quarterfinals | 4 | 2 | 0 | 0 | 2 | 16 | 16 | 0 | 6 | 2015 AFC Beach Soccer Championship | | | | | | | | |
| (The Bahamas) 2017 | Third place | 6 | 2 | 1 | 1 | 2 | 21 | 18 | +3 | 9 | 2017 AFC Beach Soccer Championship | | | | | | | | |
| (Paraguay) 2019 | Did not qualify | | | | | | | | | | 2019 AFC Beach Soccer Championship | | | | | | | | |
| (Russia) 2021 | Did not qualify | | | | | | | | | | 2021 AFC Beach Soccer Asian Cup (Cancelled) * | | | | | | | | |
| (United Arab Emirates) 2024 | Third place | 6 | 4 | 0 | 1 | 1 | 27 | 17 | +10 | 13 | 2023 AFC Beach Soccer Asian Cup | | | | | | | | |
| (Seychelles) 2025 | Quarterfinals | 4 | 2 | 0 | 0 | 2 | 18 | 16 | +2 | 6 | 2025 AFC Beach Soccer Asian Cup | | | | | | | | |
| 2027 | - | 0 | 0 | 0 | 0 | 0 | 0 | 0 | +0 | 0 | 2026 AFC Beach Soccer Asian Cup | | | | | | | | |
| Total | 9/13 | 36 | 12 | 1 | 2 | 21 | 140 | 148 | –8 | 40 | 0 | 0 | 0 | 0 | 0 | 0 | 0 | +0 | 0 |

- 2005 Invited by FIFA
- 2021 Nominated by AFC (Disputed)

=== World Beach Games ===
| World Beach Games | | | | | | | | | | | Qualification | | | | | | | | |
| Year | Round | M | W | WE | WP | L | GF | GA | GD | Points | M | W | WE | WP | L | GF | GA | GD | Points |
|---|---|---|---|---|---|---|---|---|---|---|---|---|---|---|---|---|---|---|---|
| (Qatar) 2019 | Third place | 5 | 2 | 0 | 2 | 1 | 25 | 27 | –2 | 8 | BSWW World Ranking | | | | | | | | |
| (Indonesia) 2023 | Qualified but tournament cancelled | | | | | | | | | | 3 | 2 | 0 | 0 | 1 | 13 | 10 | +3 | 6 |
| (Vietnam) 2027 | Future | | | | | | | | | | Future | | | | | | | | |
| Total | 1/1 | 5 | 2 | 0 | 2 | 1 | 25 | 27 | –2 | 8 | 3 | 2 | 0 | 0 | 1 | 13 | 10 | +3 | 6 |

=== Beach Soccer Intercontinental Cup ===
Beach Soccer Intercontinental Cup
| Year | Round | M | W | WE | WP | L | GF | GA | GD | Points |
|---|---|---|---|---|---|---|---|---|---|---|
| (United Arab Emirates) 2011 | Did not qualify | | | | | | | | | |
| (United Arab Emirates) 2012 | Did not qualify | | | | | | | | | |
| (United Arab Emirates) 2013 | Champions | 5 | 2 | 0 | 3 | 0 | 19 | 17 | +2 | 9 |
| (United Arab Emirates) 2014 | Fourth place | 5 | 2 | 0 | 0 | 3 | 12 | 12 | 0 | 6 |
| (United Arab Emirates) 2015 | Third place | 5 | 2 | 0 | 1 | 2 | 15 | 15 | 0 | 7 |
| (United Arab Emirates) 2016 | Runner-up | 5 | 3 | 0 | 1 | 1 | 23 | 18 | +5 | 10 |
| (United Arab Emirates) 2017 | Third place | 5 | 3 | 0 | 0 | 2 | 20 | 15 | +5 | 9 |
| (United Arab Emirates) 2018 | Champions | 5 | 5 | 0 | 0 | 0 | 22 | 8 | +14 | 15 |
| (United Arab Emirates) 2019 | Champions | 5 | 3 | 0 | 2 | 0 | 22 | 14 | +8 | 11 |
| (United Arab Emirates) 2021 | Runner -up | 5 | 3 | 0 | 0 | 2 | 26 | 19 | +7 | 9 |
| (United Arab Emirates) 2022 | Champions | 5 | 4 | 1 | 0 | 0 | 23 | 12 | +11 | 14 |
| Total | 9/11 | 45 | 27 | 1 | 7 | 10 | 182 | 130 | +52 | 90 |

=== AFC Beach Soccer Asian Cup ===
Asian Championship
| Year | Round | M | W | WE | WP | L | GF | GA | GD | Points |
|---|---|---|---|---|---|---|---|---|---|---|
| (United Arab Emirates) 2006 | Third place | 4 | 2 | 0 | 0 | 2 | 19 | 21 | –2 | 6 |
| (United Arab Emirates) 2007 | Third place | 4 | 2 | 0 | 0 | 2 | 20 | 15 | +5 | 6 |
| (United Arab Emirates) 2008 | Third place | 4 | 2 | 0 | 0 | 2 | 11 | 7 | +4 | 6 |
| (United Arab Emirates) 2009 | Fourth place | 5 | 3 | 0 | 0 | 2 | 20 | 12 | +8 | 9 |
| (Oman) 2011 | Third place | 5 | 3 | 1 | 0 | 1 | 23 | 11 | +12 | 11 |
| (Qatar) 2013 | Champions | 5 | 4 | 0 | 1 | 0 | 43 | 13 | +30 | 13 |
| (Qatar) 2015 | Third place | 5 | 4 | 0 | 0 | 1 | 29 | 12 | +17 | 12 |
| (Malaysia) 2017 | Champions | 6 | 6 | 0 | 0 | 0 | 50 | 11 | +39 | 18 |
| (Thailand) 2019 | Quarterfinals | 3 | 1 | 0 | 0 | 2 | 10 | 9 | +1 | 3 |
| (Thailand) 2023 | Champions | 6 | 6 | 0 | 0 | 0 | 54 | 12 | +42 | 18 |
| (Thailand) 2025 | Champions | 6 | 6 | 0 | 0 | 0 | 55 | 6 | +49 | 18 |
| (Thailand) 2026 | - | 0 | 0 | 0 | 0 | 0 | 0 | 0 | +0 | 0 |
| Total | 12/12 | 53 | 39 | 1 | 1 | 12 | 334 | 129 | +205 | 120 |

2021 in (Thailand) was cancelled due to the COVID-19 pandemic in Asia.

=== Asian Beach Games ===
Asian Beach Games
| Year | Round | M | W | WE | WP | L | GF | GA | GD | Points |
|---|---|---|---|---|---|---|---|---|---|---|
| (Indonesia) 2008 | Quarterfinal | 4 | 3 | 0 | 0 | 1 | 20 | 11 | +9 | 9 |
| (Oman) 2010 | Third place | 6 | 5 | 0 | 0 | 1 | 40 | 15 | +25 | 15 |
| (China) 2012 | Champions | 6 | 6 | 0 | 0 | 0 | 33 | 9 | +24 | 18 |
| (Thailand) 2014 | Champions | 5 | 3 | 0 | 1 | 1 | 21 | 16 | +5 | 10 |
| (Vietnam) 2016 | Did not enter | | | | | | | | | |
| (China) 2026 | Champions | 5 | 5 | 0 | 0 | 0 | 35 | 7 | +28 | 15 |
| (Philippines) 2028 | Future | | | | | | | | | |
| Total | 5/6 | 26 | 22 | 0 | 1 | 3 | 155 | 58 | +97 | 67 |

=== Continental Beach Soccer Tournament ===
Continental Beach Soccer Tournament
| Year | Round | M | W | WE | WP | L | GF | GA | GD | Points |
|---|---|---|---|---|---|---|---|---|---|---|
| (China) 2016 | Champions | 3 | 3 | 0 | 0 | 0 | 21 | 5 | +16 | 9 |
| Total | 1/1 | 3 | 3 | 0 | 0 | 0 | 21 | 5 | +16 | 9 |

=== WAFF Beach Soccer Championship ===
West Asian Beach Soccer Championship
| Year | Round | M | W | WE | WP | L | GF | GA | GD | Points |
|---|---|---|---|---|---|---|---|---|---|---|
| (Iran) 2013 | Champions | 4 | 3 | 0 | 1 | 0 | 20 | 8 | +12 | 10 |
| Total | 1/1 | 4 | 3 | 0 | 1 | 0 | 20 | 8 | +12 | 10 |

=== Persian Beach Soccer Cup ===
Persian Beach Soccer Cup
| Year | Round | M | W | WE | WP | L | GF | GA | GD | Points |
|---|---|---|---|---|---|---|---|---|---|---|
| (Iran) 2017 | Champions | 3 | 2 | 0 | 1 | 0 | 10 | 8 | +2 | 7 |
| (Iran) 2018 | Champions | 3 | 3 | 0 | 0 | 0 | 13 | 7 | +6 | 9 |
| Total | 2/2 | 6 | 5 | 0 | 1 | 0 | 23 | 15 | +8 | 16 |

== World Cup record ==
World Cup matches (by opponent)
| Against | Wins | Losses | Total |
|---|---|---|---|
| Argentina | 1 | 0 | 1 |
| Belarus | 1 | 0 | 1 |
| Brazil | 0 | 3 | 3 |
| Canada | 0 | 1 | 1 |
| France | 0 | 2 | 2 |
| Italy | 1 | 2 | 3 |
| Mexico | 2 | 0 | 2 |
| Nigeria | 1 | 0 | 1 |
| Portugal | 0 | 1 | 1 |
| Russia | 0 | 1 | 1 |
| Senegal | 1 | 2 | 3 |
| Spain | 3 | 1 | 4 |
| Switzerland | 1 | 1 | 2 |
| Tahiti | 1 | 2 | 3 |
| United Arab Emirates | 1 | 0 | 1 |
| Ukraine | 0 | 1 | 1 |
| United States | 0 | 1 | 1 |
| Uruguay | 0 | 1 | 1 |
| Total | 13 | 19 | 32 |

World Cup history
| Year | Round | Score | Result |
|---|---|---|---|
| 2006 | Round 1 | Iran 3–6France | Lose |
| 2006 | Round 1 | Iran 1–6 Spain | Lose |
| 2006 | Round 1 | Iran 6–6 (0–1 P.S.O.) Canada | Lose |
| 2007 | Round 1 | Iran 3–3 (0–1 P.S.O.)Portugal | Lose |
| 2007 | Round 1 | Iran 6–7 United States | Lose |
| 2007 | Round 1 | Iran 5–4 Spain | Won |
| 2008 | Round 1 | Iran 1–6 Uruguay | Lose |
| 2008 | Round 1 | Iran 6–6 (1–2 P.S.O) France | Lose |
| 2008 | Round 1 | Iran 1–4 Senegal | Lose |
| 2011 | Round 1 | Iran 6–6 (4–5 P.S.O) Italy | Lose |
| 2011 | Round 1 | Iran 4–6 Switzerland | Lose |
| 2011 | Round 1 | Iran 3–5 Senegal | Lose |
| 2013 | Round 1 | Iran 1–4 Brazil | Lose |
| 2013 | Round 1 | Iran 5–3 Senegal | Won |
| 2013 | Round 1 | Iran 2–3 Ukraine | Lose |
| 2013 | Quarter Finals | Iran 5–6 Russia | Lose |
| 2015 | Round 1 | Iran 6–5 Spain | Won |
| 2015 | Round 1 | Iran 3–4 Brazil | Lose |
| 2015 | Round 1 | Iran 3–2 Mexico | Won |
| 2015 | Quarter Finals | Iran 4–5 Tahiti | Lose |
| 2017 | Round 1 | Iran 3–2 Mexico | Won |
| 2017 | Round 1 | Iran 4–5 Italy | Loss |
| 2017 | Round 1 | Iran 4–4 (2–1 P.S.O) Nigeria | Won |
| 2017 | Quarter Finals | Iran 5–4 Switzerland | Won |
| 2017 | Semi-finals | Iran 1–1 (2–3 P.S.O) Tahiti | Loss |
| 2017 | 3rd place match | Iran 5–3 Italy | Won |
| 2024 | Round 1 | Iran 6–6 (3–1 P.S.O) Spain | Won |
| 2024 | Round 1 | Iran 6–3 Argentina | Won |
| 2024 | Round 1 | Iran 5–3 Tahiti | Won |
| 2024 | Quarter Finals | Iran 2–1 United Arab Emirates | Won |
| 2024 | Semi-finals | Iran 2–3 Brazil | Loss |
| 2024 | 3rd place match | Iran 6–1 Belarus | Won |

== History of coaches ==
- (Iran) Farshad Falahatzadeh (2006)
- (Brazil) Marco Octávio (2007)
- (Iran) Farshad Falahatzadeh (2008)
- (Iran) Reza Sadeghpour (2009)
- (Brazil) Marco Octávio (2010)
- (Iran) Behzad Dadashzadeh (2011)
- (Brazil) Marco Octávio (2012–2015)
- (Iran) Mohammad Hossein Mirshamsi (2015–2017)
- (Brazil) Marco Octávio (2017–2019)
- (Iran) Abbas Hashempour (2021–2022)
- (Iran) Ali Naderi (2022–present)

== Former notable players ==
- Behzad Dadashzadeh
- Farshad Falahatzadeh

== See also ==
- Iran national football team
- Iran national futsal team

Sporting positions
| Preceded by 2012 Russia | Beach Soccer Intercontinental Cup; 2013 (first title) | Succeeded by 2014 Brazil |
| Preceded by 2011 Japan | Asian Champions; 2013 (first title) | Succeeded by 2015 Oman |
| Preceded by 2010 United Arab Emirates | Asian Beach Games; 2012 (first title) | Succeeded by Incumbent |
