= Lebanon national beach soccer team =

Lebanon
- Nickname(s): رجال الأرز (The Cedars)
- Association: Lebanese Football Association (LFA)
- Confederation: AFC (Asia)
- Sub-confederation: WAFF (West Asia)
- Head coach: Khaled Berjaui
- Captain: Mohamad Merhi
- FIFA code: LBN
- BSWW ranking: 51 ▲3 (2 September 2026)
First colours
Second colours

AFC Beach Soccer Asian Cup
- Appearances: 6 (first in 2013)
- Best result: Fourth place (2015, 2017)
Medal record
Men's Beach soccer
Asian Beach Games
Bronze medal – third place	Da Nang 2016

The Lebanon national beach soccer team (Arabic: منتخب لبنان لكرة القدم الشاطئية) represents Lebanon in international beach soccer competitions and is controlled by the Lebanon Football Association, the governing body for football in Lebanon.

In 2016 Lebanon achieved third place at the 5th Asian Beach Games, beating Afghanistan 9–5 at the bronze medal match. This became the first medal in an AFC-sanctioned competition in the history of the Lebanese Football Association for any men's national team (football, futsal and beach soccer). They have also managed two fourth place finishes in a row at the AFC Beach Soccer Asian Cup, in 2015 and 2017, narrowly missing out on the FIFA Beach Soccer World Cup both times.

== Competitive record ==
=== FIFA Beach Soccer World Cup ===
Year	Round	Pos	Pld	W	W+	WP	L	GF	GA
(Brazil) 1995	did not enter								
(Brazil) 1996	did not enter								
(Brazil) 1997	did not enter								
(Brazil) 1998	did not enter								
(Brazil) 1999	did not enter								
(Brazil) 2000	did not enter								
(Brazil) 2001	did not enter								
(Brazil) 2002	did not enter								
(Brazil) 2003	did not enter								
(Brazil) 2004	did not enter								
(Brazil) 2005	did not enter								
(Brazil) 2006	did not enter								
(Brazil) 2007	did not enter								
(France) 2008	did not enter								
(United Arab Emirates) 2009	did not enter								
(Italy) 2011	did not enter								
(French Polynesia) 2013	did not qualify								
(Portugal) 2015	did not qualify								
(The Bahamas) 2017	did not qualify								
(Paraguay) 2019	did not qualify								
(Russia) 2021	did not qualify								
(United Arab Emirates) 2023	did not qualify								
(Seychelles) 2025	did not qualify								
Total	Best: N/A	0/19	0	0	0	0	0	0	0

=== AFC Beach Soccer Asian Cup ===
Year	Round	Pos	Pld	W	W+	WP	L	GF	GA
(United Arab Emirates) 2006	did not enter								
(United Arab Emirates) 2007	did not enter								
(United Arab Emirates) 2008	did not enter								
(United Arab Emirates) 2009	did not enter								
(Oman) 2011	did not enter								
(Qatar) 2013	Group stage	8th of 16	3	2	0	0	1	16	13
(Qatar) 2015	Fourth place	4th of 14	5	1	1	0	3	18	19
(Malaysia) 2017	Fourth place	4th of 12	4	2	0	0	2	17	14
(Thailand) 2019	Quarter-finals	5th of 15	4	2	0	0	2	21	12
(Thailand) 2023	Group stage	9th of 16	3	1	0	0	2	16	13
(Thailand) 2025	Quarter-finals	6th of 16	4	2	0	0	2	18	18
Total	Best: fourth place	6/11	20	10	1	0	12	104	89

=== Asian Beach Games ===
Year	Round	Pos	Pld	W	W+	WP	L	GF	GA
(Indonesia) Bali 2008	did not enter								
(Oman) Muscat 2010	Group stage	10th of 16	3	1	0	0	2	12	16
(China) Haiyang 2012	Fourth place	4th of 15	6	3	1	0	2	30	24
(Thailand) Phuket 2014	did not enter								
(Vietnam) Da Nang 2016	Third place	3rd of 11	5	2	0	2	1	25	17
(China) Sanya 2026	did not enter								
Total	Best: third place	3/6	14	6	1	2	5	67	57

=== WAFF Beach Soccer Championship ===
Year	Round	Pos	Pld	W	W+	WP	L	GF	GA
(Iran) 2013	Group stage	5th of 7	3	1	0	0	2	10	16
(Saudi Arabia) 2022	Group stage	5th of 7	3	1	0	0	2	12	12
Total	Best: group stage	2/2	6	2	0	0	4	22	28

== Players ==
=== Current squad ===
The following 12 players were called up for the 2026 AFC Beach Soccer Asian Cup.

Note: Flags indicate national team as defined under FIFA eligibility rules; some limited exceptions apply. Players may hold more than one non-FIFA nationality.

No.	Pos.	Nation	Player
1	GK	LBN	Ali Halal
2		LBN	Mohamad Osman
3		LBN	Mohamad Haidar
4		LBN	Ahmed Al Khatib
5		LBN	Sameh Jalal
6		LBN	Mahmoud Matar

No.	Pos.	Nation	Player
7		LBN	Ali Al Saleh
8		LBN	Mohamad Merhi (captain)
9		LBN	Ahmed Hamed
10		LBN	Mohamad Al Saleh
11		LBN	Haitham Fattal
12	GK	LBN	Mohamad Shaker

== See also ==
- Football in Lebanon
- Lebanon national football team
- Lebanon national futsal team
