= Bahrain national beach soccer team =

Bahrain beach soccer team

Bahrain
- Nickname(s): أحمر الشواطئ (The Beaches' Red)
- Association: Bahrain Football Association
- Confederation: Asian Football Confederation
- Head coach: Sadeq Marhoon
- FIFA code: BHR
- BSWW ranking: 43 ▲2 (19 January 2026)
First colours
Second colours

First international
- Bahrain 7–4 United Arab Emirates (Dubai, United Arab Emirates; 22 May 2006)

Biggest win
- Bahrain 8–2 Laos (Doha, Qatar; 24 March 2015)

Biggest defeat
- Iran 11–0 Bahrain (Pattaya, Thailand; 27 March 2025)

World Cup
- Appearances: 2 (first in 2006)
- Best result: Quarter-finals (2005)

AFC Beach Soccer Asian Cup
- Appearances: 10 (first in 2006)
- Best result: Champions (2006)

WAFF Beach Soccer Championship
- Appearances: 2 (first in 2013)
- Best result: Third place (2022)

Arab Beach Soccer Cup
- Appearances: 1 (first in 2010)
- Best result: Third place (2010)

The Bahrain national beach soccer team represents Bahrain in international beach soccer competitions and is controlled by the Bahrain Football Association, the governing body for football in Bahrain.

Bahrain qualified for the 2006 World Cup as AFC Group winners. Subsequently, Bahrain participated in the 2006 World Cup tournament, reaching the quarterfinals before being eliminated by Portugal.

== Current squad ==
Note: Flags indicate national team as defined under FIFA eligibility rules; some limited exceptions apply. Players may hold more than one non-FIFA nationality.

No.	Pos.	Nation	Player
1	GK	BHR	Salah Salman
2	FW	BHR	Abdulla Omar
3	DF	BHR	Mohamed Ashoor
4	DF	BHR	Mahmood Alghawi
5	DF	BHR	Abdulla Alabdulla
6	DF	BHR	Ebrahim Hassan

No.	Pos.	Nation	Player
7	DF	BHR	Adnan Ebrahim
8	MF	BHR	Yaqoob Alnisuf
9	FW	BHR	Rashed Salem
10	FW	BHR	Sayed Hassan
11	FW	BHR	Isa Saleh
12	GK	BHR	Hesam Almannaei

Coach: (Brazil) Gustavo Zlocewick

== Achievements ==
- AFC Beach Soccer Asian Cup: 2006 Winners
- FIFA Beach Soccer World Cup: 2006 Quarter Finalist's

== Tournament records ==
=== FIFA Beach Soccer World Cup ===
- 1995 – N/A
- 1996 – N/A
- 1997 – N/A
- 1998 – N/A
- 1999 – N/A
- 2000 – N/A
- 2001 – N/A
- 2002 – N/A
- 2003 – N/A
- 2004 – N/A
- 2005 – N/A
- 2006 – Quarter-Finals
- 2007 – Failed to Qualify
- 2008 – Failed to Qualify
- 2009 – Group Stage
- 2011 – Failed to Qualify
- 2013 – Failed to Qualify
- 2015 – Failed to Qualify
- 2017 – Failed to Qualify
- 2019 – Failed to Qualify
- 2021 – Did not enter
- 2023 – Failed to Qualify
- 2025 – Failed to Qualify

=== AFC Beach Soccer Asian Cup ===
AFC Beach Soccer Asian Cup record
Year	Round	Pos.	Pld	W	W+	WP	L	GF	GA
(United Arab Emirates) 2006	Final	1st	4	4	0	0	0	23	9
(United Arab Emirates) 2007	Third place match	4th	4	1	0	0	3	6	15
(United Arab Emirates) 2008	Did not enter								
(United Arab Emirates) 2009	Final	2nd	4	2	0	1	1	12	8
(Oman) 2011	Quarter-finals	6th	4	2	0	0	2	12	15
(Qatar) 2013	Ninth place match	9th	5	2	0	1	2	13	14
(Qatar) 2015	Seventh place match	7th	6	2	1	0	3	22	15
(Malaysia) 2017	Group stage	6th	4	3	0	0	1	19	14
(Thailand) 2019	Quarter-finals	8th	4	2	0	0	2	15	15
(Thailand) 2021	Cancelled								
(Thailand) 2023	Quarter-finals	7th	4	2	0	0	2	8	17
(Thailand) 2025	Quarter-finals	8th	4	1	0	0	3	7	23
Total	Champions	10/11	43	21	1	2	19	137	145
