= 2021 AFC Beach Soccer Asian Cup =

ฟุตบอลชายหาดเอเชียนคัพ 2021

Tournament details
- Host country: Thailand
- Dates: Cancelled
- Teams: 16 (expected) (from 1 confederation)

The 2021 AFC Beach Soccer Asian Cup was originally to be the 10th edition (3rd official edition) of the AFC Beach Soccer Asian Cup (previously the AFC Beach Soccer Championship before rebranding from 2021), the premier beach soccer tournament contested by Asian men's national teams, organised by the Asian Football Confederation (AFC).

The tournament would originally take place in Thailand. It was originally scheduled to be played between 18–28 March 2021. On 10 November 2020, the AFC approved the proposal to move the tournament to between 28 April to 8 May 2021 to allow teams more time to prepare for the tournament due to the COVID-19 pandemic. However, the tournament was eventually cancelled, with the official announcement made by the AFC on 25 January 2021, and Thailand would instead host the next edition in 2023.

A total of 16 teams were originally expected to participate. Japan were the defending champions.

== Qualified teams for FIFA Beach Soccer World Cup ==
The tournament would also have acted as the qualification tournament for Asian teams to the 2021 FIFA Beach Soccer World Cup in Russia; the top three teams would have qualified.

On 21 April 2021, the AFC announced that they agreed to utilize a point system which ranks the performances of the continent’s top eight teams in the last three editions of the AFC Beach Soccer Asian Cup (2015, 2017, 2019). Based on the ranking of the point system, Japan, Oman and United Arab Emirates were nominated as the AFC representatives at the 2021 FIFA Beach Soccer World Cup.

Team	Qualified on	Previous appearances in FIFA Beach Soccer World Cup^{1} only FIFA era (since 2005)
Japan	21 April 2021	10 (2005, 2006, 2007, 2008, 2009, 2011, 2013, 2015, 2017, 2019)
Oman	21 April 2021	3 (2011, 2015, 2019)
United Arab Emirates	21 April 2021	6 (2007, 2008, 2009, 2013, 2017, 2019)

^{1} Bold indicates champions for that year. Italic indicates hosts for that year.
