= Palestine national beach soccer team =

National sports team

Palestine
- Confederation: AFC
- FIFA code: PLE
- BSWW ranking: 65 ▼1 (2 September 2026)

AFC Beach Soccer Championship
- Appearances: 2 (first in 2013)
- Best result: Semi-finals (2019)

Palestine national beach soccer team represents Palestine in international beach soccer competitions. It reached the semi-finals of the AFC Beach Soccer Championship in 2019 for the first time.

== Competition records ==
=== AFC Beach Soccer Championship record ===
2006 AFC Beach Soccer Championship record
Year	Round	Position	Pld	W	D*	L	GF	GA
(United Arab Emirates) 2006	Did not enter							
(United Arab Emirates) 2007	Did not enter							
(United Arab Emirates) 2008	Did not enter							
(United Arab Emirates) 2009	Did not enter							
(Oman) 2011	Withdrew							
(Qatar) 2013	Fifth place final	6th	5	2	1	2	24	20
(Qatar) 2015	Withdrew							
(Malaysia) 2017	Did not enter							
(Thailand) 2019	Semi-finals	4th	5	4	0	1	18	18
(Thailand) 2023	Group Stage	12th	3	1	0	2	4	12
Total	4th place	5/10	13	7	1	5	46	50
