= Kuwait national beach soccer team =

National sports team

Kuwait
- Nickname: Al-Azraq (The Blue)
- Association: Kuwait Football Association
- Confederation: AFC (Asia)
- Head coach: Jali Al Juraid
- FIFA code: KUW
- BSWW ranking: 63 ▼1 (1 June 2026)
First colours
Second colours

The Kuwait national beach soccer team represents Kuwait in international beach soccer competitions. It is controlled by the Kuwait Football Association, the governing body for football in Kuwait.

== Current squad ==
Correct as of March 2011

Note: Flags indicate national team as defined under FIFA eligibility rules; some limited exceptions apply. Players may hold more than one non-FIFA nationality.

No.	Pos.	Nation	Player
—	GK		Nawaf Hajiah
—	FW		Yousef Alsaqer
—	FW		Soud Alotaibi
—	FW		Meshari Alhezami
—	DF		Mubarak Alsuabaie
—	DF		Abdulwahhab Alsafi

No.	Pos.	Nation	Player
—	FW		Omar Aljaser
—	FW		Abdulaziz Aleid
—	FW		Ahmad Albuloushi
—	DF		Salem Amaan
—	GK		Khaled Alotaibi
—	GK		Mohammad Ashknani

Coach: Jali Al Juraid

== Achievements ==
- AFC Beach Soccer Championship Best: Ninth place
  - 2015
- Asian Beach Games Best: Thirteenth place
  - 2010
