= 2007 AFC Beach Soccer Championship =

2007 FIFA Beach Soccer World Cup qualifiers for (AFC)

Tournament details
- Host country: United Arab Emirates
- City: Dubai
- Dates: 14–18 August
- Teams: 6 (from 1 confederation)
- Venue: 1 (in 1 host city)

Final positions
- Champions: United Arab Emirates (1st title)
- Runners-up: Japan
- Third place: Iran
- Fourth place: Bahrain

Tournament statistics
- Matches played: 10
- Goals scored: 76 (7.6 per match)

The 2007 AFC Beach Soccer championship also known as the 2007 FIFA Beach Soccer World Cup qualifiers for (AFC) was the second beach soccer championship for Asia, held in August 2007, in Dubai, United Arab Emirates. The United Arab Emirates won the championship, with Japan finishing second and Iran winning the third place-play off, to claim third. The three teams moved on to play in the 2007 FIFA Beach Soccer World Cup in Rio de Janeiro, Brazil from 2 November – 11 November.

== Participating nations ==
- Bahrain
- China
- India
- Iran
- Japan
- United Arab Emirates

== Group stage ==
=== Group A ===
Team	Pts	Pld	W	W+	L	GF	GA	GD
United Arab Emirates	6	2	2	0	0	12	5	+7
Japan	3	2	1	0	1	7	9	-2
India	0	2	0	0	2	5	10	-5

14 August 2007

United Arab Emirates	6 – 2	India

Dubai

15 August 2007

Japan	4 – 3	India

Dubai

16 August 2007

United Arab Emirates	6 – 3	Japan

Dubai

=== Group B ===
Team	Pts	Pld	W	W+	L	GF	GA	GD
Iran	3	2	1	0	1	8	7	+1
Bahrain	3	2	1	0	1	4	4	0
China	2	2	0	1	1	6	7	-1

14 August 2007

Bahrain	2 – 1	China

Dubai

15 August 2007

China	5 – 5 4-3 (pens.)	Iran

Dubai

16 August 2007

Iran	3 – 2	Bahrain

Dubai

== Knockout stage ==
Semi-finals
17 August 2007
UAE	5
Bahrain	2
17 August 2007
Japan	8
Iran	6

Final
18 August 2007
UAE	4
Japan	3
Third place
18 August 2007
Iran	6
Bahrain	0

== Winners ==
(2007) FIFA Beach Soccer World Cup
Qualification (AFC) Winners:

United Arab Emirates
First title

== Final standings ==
Rank	Team
1	United Arab Emirates
2	Japan
3	Iran
4	Bahrain
5	China
6	India
