= 2006 AFC Beach Soccer Championship =

2006 FIFA Beach Soccer World Cup qualifiers for (AFC)

Tournament details
- Host country: United Arab Emirates
- City: Dubai
- Dates: 22–26 May
- Teams: 6 (from 1 confederation)
- Venue: 1 (in 1 host city)

Final positions
- Champions: Bahrain (1st title)
- Runners-up: Japan
- Third place: Iran
- Fourth place: China

Tournament statistics
- Matches played: 10
- Goals scored: 90 (9 per match)

The 2006 AFC Beach Soccer championship also known as the 2006 FIFA Beach Soccer World Cup qualifiers for (AFC) was the first beach soccer championship for Asia, held in May 2006, in Dubai, United Arab Emirates. Bahrain won the championship, with Japan finishing second and Iran winning the third place-play off, to claim third. The three teams moved on to play in the 2006 FIFA Beach Soccer World Cup in Rio de Janeiro, Brazil from 2 November – 12 November.

== Competing nations ==
- Bahrain
- China
- Iran
- Japan
- Philippines
- United Arab Emirates (hosts)

== Group stage ==
=== Group A ===
Team	Pld	W	W+	L	GF	GA	GD	Pts
Japan	2	2	0	0	23	3	+20	6
Iran	2	1	0	1	11	10	+1	3
Philippines	2	0	0	2	3	24	−21	0

22 May 2006

Japan	16 – 0	Philippines

Jumeirah Beach Park, Dubai

23 May 2006

Japan	7 – 3	Iran

Jumeirah Beach Park, Dubai

24 May 2006

Iran	8 – 3	Philippines

Jumeirah Beach Park, Dubai

=== Group B ===
Team	Pld	W	W+	L	GF	GA	GD	Pts
Bahrain	2	2	0	0	11	4	+7	6
China	2	1	0	1	4	7	−3	3
United Arab Emirates	2	0	0	2	7	11	−4	0

22 May 2006

Bahrain	7 – 4	United Arab Emirates

Jumeirah Beach Park, Dubai

23 May 2006

Bahrain	4 – 0	China

Jumeirah Beach Park, Dubai

24 May 2006

China	4 – 3	United Arab Emirates

Jumeirah Beach Park, Dubai

== Knockout stage ==
Semi-finals
25 May 2006
Bahrain	7
Iran	2
25 May 2006
Japan	3
China	2

Final
26 May 2006
Bahrain	5
Japan	3
Third place
26 May 2006
Iran	6
China	4

== Winners ==
(2006) FIFA Beach Soccer World Cup
Qualification (AFC) Winners:

Bahrain
First title

== Final standings ==
Rank	Team
1	Bahrain
2	Japan
3	Iran
4	China
5	United Arab Emirates
6	Philippines
