= BSWW World Ranking =

Ranking for men's national teams in beach soccer

Top 20 rankings as of 1 June 2026
Rank	Change	Team	Points
1	Steady	Brazil	3591.5
2	▲1	Italy	2768
2	Steady	Russia	******
3	▼1	Portugal	2764.5
4	Steady	Belarus	2510.5
5	Steady	Spain	1939.5
6	Steady	Iran	1794.25
7	Steady	Senegal	1365.75
8	Steady	Japan	1296.5
9	Steady	Paraguay	1092.75
10	▲2	Tahiti	1055.75
11	Steady	United Arab Emirates	1030
12	▼2	Oman	1017
13	Steady	El Salvador	974.75
14	Steady	Switzerland	850
15	Steady	Colombia	791
16	▲1	Morocco	714
17	▼1	United States	676.75
18	▲3	Ukraine	656
19	▼1	Saudi Arabia	617.25
20	▲2	Argentina	571
*Change from 6 May 2026
Complete rankings at beachsoccer.com

The BSWW World Ranking is a ranking system for men's national teams in beach soccer, calculated by the sport's developmental body, Beach Soccer Worldwide (BSWW). The rankings are currently led by Brazil who have held the number one spot since March 2023.

The teams (both member nations of FIFA – the sport's governing body – and non-members) are ranked using a "points-per-event system", whereby the ranking of the team in the final standings of each event they participate in awards that team a certain number of points; the teams that accumulate the most points are ranked highest.

The rankings were introduced in February 2014 and were originally updated monthly; since the outbreak of the COVID-19 pandemic, new issues have been released at irregular intervals. To date, only three teams (Russia, Portugal and Brazil) have held the top position, of which Brazil have spent the longest ranked first.

The ranking system is based upon that which is used to produce the FIFA World Rankings in its parent sport, association football, and since its establishment has been used for such purposes as seeding teams at the FIFA Beach Soccer World Cup.

== Background ==
Since the 2000s, BSWW had been producing a European ranking; it was used to seed the teams in regional events. At each competition the teams played in, they earned points depending on their final position (an approach also adapted for use in the world ranking).

BSWW believed creating a world ranking would help teams, national associations and fans in understanding the "reality of beach soccer".

The ranking was first presented at the 2nd FIFA Beach Soccer Workshop in Dubai from 22 to 23 November 2013 to representatives of over 100 national associations who debated the composition of its materialisation.

In building the initial version of the ranking, BSWW took into account "many aspects and factors" used to create the FIFA World Rankings. Points earned from events over the previous five years (2009–13) were observed to include the outcomes of the three previous World Cups, therefore providing "an extensive results record and a solid criteria" for its basis; the results of over 1400 matches from ~100 events were integrated into the ranking. The weight of a team's points was reduced by 20% going back year on year.

The finalised version was subsequently released on 6 February 2014; for succeeding updates, the current calculation method immediately superseded the method use to create the initial ranking. (Note: As of the current calculation method date stated, the ranking system has remained largely the same throughout its existence, with the exception of some minor alterations that have been introduced gradually over time, most notably the addition of new competition tiers (for example, the World Beach Games have only existed since 2019). Temporary changes to the points distribution of some events were also made in consideration of the impact of the COVID-19 pandemic.)

== Current calculation method ==
Correct as of November 2022

=== Points distribution ===
The teams are ranked using a "points-per-event system"; in each event they participate, the teams will earn ranking points (providing the event is sanctioned by BSWW and/or FIFA) – the number of points they earn is determined by their placement in the final standings of that event. The higher in the standings the team finishes, the more points they will earn. Runners-up receive 25% less points than the champions; for most subsequent places, they receive 20% less points than the position above.

BSWW have divided the different types of competitions on the calendar into eight tiers of prestige for the purposes of the world ranking. Higher tier events that are deemed to be the most prestigious reward teams with more points than lower tier events.

The following table shows exactly how many points a team will earn per their final position at each type of event:

Key:
Symbol	Description
†	a) The points on offer vary for each continent due to the perceived strength of the different confederations. Strength is calculated by considering interconfederation matches at the last three FIFA Beach Soccer World Cups. The confederations that win the most points on average from these matches are considered strongest and therefore receive more points in tier 3 tournaments than the weaker ones. b) Continental championships also act as qualification tournaments to the World Cup (WC). Since the WC hosts qualify automatically, sometimes they do not compete in their respective continental championship. To compensate for their induced absence, the team is automatically awarded with a set of points – the average they have earned from their last three appearances in the championship.
∇	Applies to Europe only – note that unlike any other competitions, points earned from regular season events expire from a team's ranking points total immediately after the end of the league season, not after the usual four year limit.
‡	Premium and Category 1 events are organised by BSWW; they involve a larger number of FIFA referees, more BSWW delegates, higher stadium standards and more TV coverage than Category 2 events.
∆	In the event a friendly ends in a tie, both teams receive 5 points.
—	This position is never applicable to this competition.
...	Continued from previous (when/if applicable).

Tier	Event			Points per position in final standings of event																						
Tier	Event			C	RU	3rd	4th	5th	6th	7th	8th	9th	10th	11th	12th	13th	14th	15th	16th	17th	18th	19th	20th	21st	22nd	...
1	FIFA Beach Soccer World Cup			1750	1315	1050	840	670	540	430	345	275	220	175	140	115	115	115	115	—	—	—	—	—	—	—
2	World Beach Games			600	450	360	290	230	185	150	120	95	75	60	50	40	40	40	40	—	—	—	—	—	—	—
3	Continental championships^{†}	OFC; UEFA		550	415	330	265	210	170	135	110	85	70	70	70	70	70	70	70	55	55	...	...	...	...	...
3	Continental championships^{†}	CONMEBOL		544	411	327	262	208	168	134	109	84	69	—	—	—	—	—	—	—	—	—	—	—	—	—
3	Continental championships^{†}	AFC		528	398	316	254	201	163	130	105	81	67	67	67	67	67	67	67	53	53	...	...	...	...	...
3	Continental championships^{†}	CAF		484	365	290	233	185	149	119	97	75	61	61	61	61	61	61	61	48	48	...	...	...	...	...
3	Continental championships^{†}	CONCACAF		470	350	280	225	180	145	115	90	75	60	60	60	60	60	60	60	45	45	...	...	...	...	...
4	Intercontinental Cup			450	340	270	215	175	140	110	90	—	—	—	—	—	—	—	—	—	—	—	—	—	—	—
5	Continental leagues	Finals		400	300	240	190	155	125	100	90	85	80	75	75	70	70	70	70	60	60	60	60	55	55	...
5	Continental leagues	Regular season^{∇}	Division A	45	35	25	20	—	—	—	—	—	—	—	—	—	—	—	—	—	—	—	—	—	—	—
5	Continental leagues	Regular season^{∇}	Division B	25	18	13	10	—	—	—	—	—	—	—	—	—	—	—	—	—	—	—	—	—	—	—
6	Continental cups & games			300	225	180	145	115	90	75	60	50	50	...	...	...	...	...	...	...	...	...	...	...	...	...
7	BSWW Tour^{‡}	Premium		200	160	120	80	60	50	40	30	...	...	...	...	...	...	...	...	...	...	...	...	...	...	...
7	BSWW Tour^{‡}	Category 1		100	80	60	40	30	25	20	20	...	...	...	...	...	...	...	...	...	...	...	...	...	...	...
7	BSWW Tour^{‡}	Category 2		40	30	20	10	5	5	5	5	...	...	...	...	...	...	...	...	...	...	...	...	...	...	...
8	Friendly matches^{∆}			10	2	—	—	—	—	—	—	—	—	—	—	—	—	—	—	—	—	—	—	—	—	—

=== Points weighting & assessment periods ===
Only the total points earned from the above events over the last four years (counting back from the current month) go towards the team's ranking; points older than four years expire and do not count.

The four years in question are assessed as individual twelve month periods; the total points earned during each period are weighted differently to put an emphasis on the value of points earned more recently. 100% of a team's total points gained during the last twelve months count towards their ranking. However, from the three preceding twelve month periods, only a portion of their points earned during each count towards their ranking; the portion that counts gets smaller the further back in time the period in question is which are 75%, 50% and 25% of their original points totals respectively.

This is illustrated/summarised in the table below:

For the current ranking month: August 2026			Example calculation	
Time when points were earned	Period assessed in current ranking	% of points total counted	Points earned during period	Points counted towards ranking
Up to 1 year ago	September 2025 – August 2026	100%	500	x1.00 = 500
1 to 2 years ago	September 2024 – August 2025	75%	500	x0.75 = 375
2 to 3 years ago	September 2023 – August 2024	50%	500	x0.50 = 250
3 to 4 years ago	September 2022 – August 2023	25%	500	x0.25 = 125
			2000	1250

== World number 1 teams ==
=== Ranking leaders ===
Timeline of
BSWW World Ranking leaders

Three teams have been ranked world number 1, namely Russia, Portugal and Brazil. The rank leaders have roughly coincided with the team that is reigning World Cup champions during that time.

When the rankings debuted in February 2014, Russia were the inaugural leaders, having amassing over 5000 points thanks to winning the 2011 and 2013 World Cup and Euro Beach Soccer League (EBSL) titles. Portugal won the next World Cup in July 2015 and the EBSL in the August; Russia finished third in both. Despite Portugal's successes, they were not enough to knock Russia off the top spot until June 2016. Portugal relinquished their world crown to Brazil in May 2017 who immediately took the number 1 ranking and subsequently overtook Russia as the team longest ranked the world's best in October 2019. Portugal regained the World Cup title in December 2019, cutting Brazil's lead to a mere 240 points, but nevertheless the South American's clung on to the number 1 spot in the immediate aftermath of the tournament. Their near three-year stay at the top of the ranking finally ended with the release of the March 2020 listings, with world champions Portugal replacing them at the peak by a slender 21 points, becoming the first team to spend a second spell as number 1. Russia then began their second spell as ranking leaders after a five year gap, in August 2021, immediately after claiming the 2021 World Cup. By January 2022, they had spent enough time at the summit during this spell to regain the record of team longest ranked the world's best cumulatively. However, the Russian invasion of Ukraine then occurred in February; as a result, Russia were suspended from participating in BSWW competitions in accordance with sanctions imposed by FIFA and UEFA in response to the conflict. Subsequently, they were powerless in surrendering the top spot back to Portugal by November. However, Portugal's third spell as world number 1 would ultimately by the shortest of any incumbent to date, as within just a few months, a series of titles, primarily the 2023 Copa América, saw Brazil earn enough points to return to the pinnacle after three years, later leapfrogging Russia to have amassed the most time at number 1 once again by January 2024.

Two teams have peaked at number 2 without yet going on to reach the top spot which are Iran and Spain. Both Switzerland and Paraguay have peaked at number 3, the highest of any landlocked countries.

Summary of world number 1 teams
Nº	Team	Start date	End date	Months	Total
1	Russia	January 2014	May 2016	29	29
2	Portugal	June 2016	April 2017	11	11
3	Brazil	May 2017	February 2020	34	34
	Portugal (2)	March 2020	July 2021	17	28
	Russia (2)	August 2021	October 2022	15	44
	Portugal (3)	November 2022	February 2023	4	32
	Brazil (2)	March 2023	present	42	76

=== Season-end number 1 ===
The season-end number 1 is the team which garnered the most points during the calendar year in question.

Season	Team	Ref.
2013	Russia	
2014	Portugal	
2015	Portugal	
2016	Portugal	
2017	Brazil	
2018	Spain	
2019	Portugal	
2020	n/a	

== Movers of the Month ==
Movers of the Month was (2015–2021) a commendation bestowed by BSWW with the release of each new update to the rankings to give recognition to the team that during that month (providing that they had played) had moved up the rankings the most or the team which had gained the most points. It began with the September 2015 update when Power Horse became official sponsors of the rankings, started to be awarded infrequently and at irregular intervals following the outbreak of the COVID-19 pandemic, and has stopped being awarded entirely since the end of 2021.

Towards the tail end of its existence, in 2020, BSWW began awarding the commendation to teams part of the club rankings and women's national teams as well; the following tables list the men's national teams winners of Movers of the Month:

Year	Month	Movers of the Month	Change	Ref.
2015	September	Egypt	▲11	
2015	October	Trinidad and Tobago	▲2	
2015	November	Egypt	▲11	
2015	December	Ivory Coast	▲3	
2016	January	Brazil	0	
2016	February	Japan	▲2	
2016	March	Portugal	0	
2016	April	United Arab Emirates	▲2	
2016	May	England	▲6	
2016	June	Portugal	▲1	
2016	July	Brazil	▲1	
2016	August	Ukraine	▲4	
2016	September	Poland	▲22	
2016	October	Japan	▲3	
2016	November	Iran	▲1	
2016	December	Senegal	▲8	
2017	January	Switzerland	▲1	
2017	February	Panama	▲38	
2017	March	United Arab Emirates	▲9	
2017	April	Tahiti	▲1	
2017	May	Brazil	▲2	
2017	June	France	▲1	
2017	July	Belarus	▲1	
2017	August	Iran	▲1	
2017	September	Russia	▲1	
2017	October	Mexico	0	

Year	Month	Movers of the Month	Change	Ref.
2017	November	Brazil	0	
2017	December	Spain	▲3	
2018	January	Iran	0	
2018	February	Senegal	▲1	
2018	March	Brazil	0	
2018	April	Mexico	▲2	
2018	May	France	▲3	
2018	June	Portugal	0	
2018	July	Morocco	▲5	
2018	August	United States	▲8	
2018	September	Italy	▲1	
2018	October	Brazil	0	
2018	November	Iran	▲1	
2018	December	Senegal	▲4	
2019	January	Spain	0	
2019	February	Iraq	▲11	
2019	March	Japan	▲2	
2019	April	Portugal	0	
2019	May	Mexico	▲8	
2019	June	Tahiti	▲3	
2019	July	Russia	▲1	
2019	August	Portugal	▲1	
2019	September	Ukraine	▲3	
2019	October	Brazil	0	
2019	November	Japan	▲3	
2019	December	Portugal	▲2	

Year	Month	Movers of the Month	Change	Ref.
2020
2020	January	Not awarded to men's national teams		
2020	February	Not awarded to men's national teams		
2020	March	Portugal	▲1	
2020	April →	Not awarded due to the COVID-19 pandemic		
2021	→ July	Not awarded due to the COVID-19 pandemic		
2021	August	Russia	▲3	
2021	September	Portugal	0	
2021	October	Not awarded to men's national teams		
2021	November	Senegal	▲3	

== Other rankings ==
BSWW formally published a series of new rankings to accompany the primary men's national team world rankings in December 2018, all of which were concerned purely with European sides. In November 2019, these rankings were upgraded from being only European based, to fully global rankings (save for the association ranking). Unlike the men's world ranking, they are not updated monthly.

Each ranking category, and the basis of each (at the release of the current issue), is listed below.

- Women's national teams: Ranked based on recent performances in the Women's Euro Beach Soccer Cup, World Beach Games and qualifiers.
- Men's clubs: Ranked based on recent performances in the Euro Winners Cup, Copa Libertadores, Mundialito de Clubes and World Winners Cup.
- Women's clubs: Ranked based on recent performances in the Women's Euro Winners Cup and World Winners Cup.
- Men's national associations (Europe only): Ranked based on recent performances of the clubs representing them in the Euro Winners Cup, therefore determining which European leagues have the best quality of clubs (inspired by the UEFA country coefficient ranking).

The club rankings are used to seed teams in European competitions. Similar to the UEFA coefficient's relationship with the UEFA Champions League, the association ranking is used to determine the number of clubs that qualify from each country's domestic league to the next edition of the Euro Winners Cup; better quality associations receive more berths.

The following tables show the top ten in each ranking's current issue:

Key: Confederation –	AFC /	CAF /	CONCACAF /	CONMEBOL /	OFC /	UEFA

Women's national teams

September 2026 issue
Rank	Chg	Team	Points
1	▲1	Spain	1411.25
2	▼1	Portugal	1027.75
3	Steady	Poland	737.5
×	×	~~Russia~~ (Note: Russia are currently suspended from the rankings. However, their name still appears on the official ranking list, in the place of their last position before suspension. But furthermore, they are listed without a ranking or points attached.)	×
4	▼2	Ukraine	735
5	▼1	Italy	553.75
6	▼1	England	513.75
7	▼1	Czech Republic	497.25
8	▼1	Brazil	415
9	▼1	United States	369.25
10	▼1	Switzerland	361.25
Full rankings (21 teams)
*change since 4 June 2026

Men's clubs

June 2026 issue
Rank	Chg	Club	Points
1	Steady	(Israel) Kfar Qassem	4272
2	Steady	(El Salvador) Barra de Santiago	2726
3	▲2	(Paraguay) Sportivo Luqueño	2713
4	▼1	(Italy) Napoli BS	2235
5	▲2	(France) Marseille	2182
6	Steady	(Israel) Rosh Haayin	2146
7	▲13	(Brazil) Vasco de Gama	1639
8	Steady	(Greece) Napoli Patron	1851
9	▼5	(Germany) Real Münster	1850
10	Steady	(Italy) Lenergy Pisa	1768
Full rankings (491 clubs)
*change since 19 January 2026

Women's clubs

July 2026 issue
Rank	Chg	Club	Points
1	▲1	(Spain) Higicontrol	5000
2	▼1	(Brazil) São Pedro	4530
3	Steady	(Netherlands) BSZ Ladies	2650
4	▲1	(United States) Cali	2487
5	▼1	(France) Marseille BT	2189
6	▲1	(Poland) Red Devils Ladies	2087
7	▼1	(El Salvador) Barra de Santiago	2070
8	▲1	(Ukraine) Mriya 2006-Servit	1662
9	▲2	(Italy) Cagliari	1637
10	▼2	(El Salvador) BS-UES	1579
Full rankings (202 clubs)
*change since 19 January 2026

Men's national associations

2022 issue
Rank	Chg	Association	Points
1	Steady	Portugal	6902
×	×	~~Russia~~	×
2	Steady	Spain	2719
3	Steady	Ukraine	1857
4	▲4	Germany	1835
5	Steady	Poland	1145
6	▲1	Turkey	804
7	▼1	Italy	762
8	▲2	Belgium	677
9	▲3	France	657
10	▼1	Greece	547
Full rankings (28 associations)
*change since 2020
