= Qatar national beach soccer team =

Beach soccer team

Qatar
- Nickname: Al-Annabi (The Maroon)
- Association: Qatar Football Association
- Confederation: AFC (Asia)
- FIFA code: QAT
- BSWW ranking: NR (2 September 2026)
First colours
Second colours

The Qatar national beach soccer team represents Qatar in international beach soccer competitions and is controlled by the Qatar Football Association, the governing body for football in Qatar.

== Current squad ==
Correct as of December 2012.

Note: Flags indicate national team as defined under FIFA eligibility rules; some limited exceptions apply. Players may hold more than one non-FIFA nationality.

No.	Pos.	Nation	Player
—			Ahmed Farahan
—			Rashid Al Kaabi
—			Rashid Mubarak
—			Hamad Ali
—			Saleh Al Kuwari

No.	Pos.	Nation	Player
—			Shehab Menour
—			Ali Mohammed
—			Mohammed Fahad
—			Mohammed Rashid
—			Jafal Rashid

== Achievements ==
- Asian Beach Games Best: 14th place
  - 2008, 2010
