= Iraq national beach soccer team =

Iraq
- Nickname(s): Usood al-Rafidayn (Lions of Mesopotamia)
- Association: Iraq Football Association
- Confederation: AFC (Asia)
- Head coach: Karim Moghhadam
- FIFA code: IRQ
- BSWW ranking: 77 ▲1 (1 June 2026)
First colours
Second colours
Third colours

The Iraq national beach soccer team represents Iraq in international beach soccer competitions and is controlled by the Iraq Football Association, the governing body for football in Iraq.

== Current squad ==
Correct as of March 2011
Note: Flags indicate national team as defined under FIFA eligibility rules; some limited exceptions apply. Players may hold more than one non-FIFA nationality.

No.	Pos.	Nation	Player
—	GK		Husham Jaaz
—	DF		Hussein Hussein
—	DF		Karrar Taeem
—	FW		Raed Abdulnabi
—	DF		Dheyauldeen Dheyab
—	FW		Morteza Jasim

No.	Pos.	Nation	Player
—	FW		Sadeq Shhet
—	FW		Ahmad Hamad
—	DF		Muthanna Abdullah
—	DF		Mushtaq Mohammed
—	FW		Karrar Saber
—	GK		Ali Tawfeeq

Coach: Fallah Zaboon

== Achievements ==
- FIFA Beach Soccer World Cup qualification (AFC) Best: Ninth place
  - 2011
