= 2022 AFF Beach Soccer Championship =

Tournament details
- Host country: Thailand
- City: Pattaya
- Dates: 29 September – 1 October
- Teams: 3
- Venue(s): 1 (in 1 host city)

Final positions
- Champions: Thailand (2nd title)
- Runners-up: Malaysia
- Third place: Indonesia

Tournament statistics
- Matches played: 3
- Goals scored: 23 (7.67 per match)

The 2022 AFF Beach Soccer Championship is the fourth edition of the AFF Beach Soccer Championship, the premier regional beach soccer championship. This edition will features three of the members of the ASEAN Football Federation (AFF).

Organised by the AFF, the tournament takes place between 28 September and 1 October in Pattaya, Thailand, featuring three teams.

Thailand are the defending champions.

== Teams ==
Team	Appearance	Previous best performance
Thailand (hosts)	4th	Champions (2019)
Indonesia	3rd	Fourth Place (2018)
Malaysia	4th	Champions (2014)

== Group stage ==
All times are local time: UTC+7.

Pos	Team	Pld	W	D	L	GF	GA	GD	Pts
1	Thailand (H)	2	2	0	0	8	4	+4	6
2	Malaysia	2	1	0	1	10	5	+5	3
3	Indonesia	2	0	0	2	5	14	−9	0

(H) Hosts

== Winners ==
AFF Beach Soccer Championship 2022 winners

Thailand
2nd title
