= 2019 AFF Beach Soccer Championship =

Tournament details
- Host country: Thailand
- City: Chonburi
- Dates: 13–17 November
- Teams: 5 (from 3 sub-confederations)
- Venue(s): 1 (in 1 host city)

Final positions
- Champions: Thailand (1st title)
- Runners-up: Vietnam
- Third place: Malaysia
- Fourth place: Afghanistan

Tournament statistics
- Matches played: 10
- Goals scored: 100 (10 per match)

The 2019 AFF Beach Soccer Championship is the third edition of the AFF Beach Soccer Championship, the premier regional beach soccer championship. This edition will features three of the members of the ASEAN Football Federation (AFF) and two invited teams inside Asia.

Organised by the AFF, the tournament takes place between 13 and 17 November in Chonburi, Thailand, featuring five teams.

Vietnam are the defending champions.

== Teams ==
A total of 5 teams enter the tournament.

Team	Sub-confederation	Appearance	Previous best performance
Afghanistan	CAFA	1st	Debut
China	EAFF	1st	Debut
Malaysia	AFF	3rd	Champions (2014)
Thailand (hosts)	AFF	3rd	Runner-ups (2018)
Vietnam	AFF	3rd	Champions (2018)

== Group stage ==
All times are local time: UTC+7.

Pos	Team	Pld	W	D	L	GF	GA	GD	Pts
1	Thailand (H)	4	4	0	0	17	10	+7	12
2	Vietnam	4	2	0	2	17	19	−2	6
3	Malaysia	4	2	0	2	16	18	−2	6
4	Afghanistan	4	1	0	3	18	18	0	3
5	China	4	1	0	3	18	22	−4	3

(H) Hosts
13 November 2019
16:00

China	5–7	Vietnam
	Report

Referee: Suwat Wongsuwan (Thailand)
13 November 2019
17:30

Thailand	4–3	Malaysia
	Report

Referee: Waleed Mohamed Mahmood Abdullah (Bahrain)

14 November 2019
16:00

Malaysia	6–5	China
	Report

Referee: Falah Hassan Mohammed Al Balushi (Oman)
14 November 2019
17:30

Afghanistan	2–4	Thailand
	Report

Referee: Turki Abdullah Said Al Salehi (Oman)

15 November 2019
16:00

China	5–4	Afghanistan
	Report

Referee: Abdulla Qassem Abdula Saleh (Bahrain)
15 November 2019
17:30

Vietnam	5–3	Malaysia
	Report

Referee: Fallah Hassan Mohammed Al Balushi (Oman)

16 November 2019
16:00

Afghanistan	7–3	Vietnam
	Report

Referee: Wan Mohamad Tarmizi Wan Ibrahim (Malaysia)
16 November 2019
17:30

Thailand	5–3	China
	Report

Referee: Turki Abdullah Said Al Salehi (Oman)

17 November 2019
16:00

Malaysia	4 – 4 (a.e.t 6-5)	Afghanistan
	Report

Referee: Choi Youngin (Korea)
17 November 2019
17:30

Vietnam	2 – 4	Thailand
	Report

Referee: Wan Mohamad Tarmizi Wan Ibrahim (Malaysia)

== Winners ==
AFF Beach Soccer Championship 2019 winners

Thailand
1st title
