= Naret Sukngam =

Thai beach soccer player

Personal information
- Full name: Naret Sukngam
- Date of birth: 6 December 1976 (age 49)
- Place of birth: Phichit Province, Thailand
- Position: Defender

International career
Years	Team	Apps	(Gls)
- Thailand

Naret Sukngam (born December 6, 1976) is a member of the Thailand national beach soccer team.
