= Shahram Danekar =

Iranian soccer player and coach (born 1969)

Shahram Danehkar
Personal information
- Full name: Shahram Danehkar
- Date of birth: September 14, 1969
- Place of birth: Karaj, Iran

Managerial career
- Years: Team
- 2006–2011: Iran
- 2011–2013: Thailand
Medal record
Beach soccer
Representing Iran
Iranian Beach Soccer Premier League
Gold medal – first place	2006	Iran Tose’e Karaj
Gold medal – first place	2007	Iran Tose’e Karaj
Gold medal – first place	2008	Iran Tose’e Karaj
Gold medal – first place	2009	Iran Tose’e Karaj
Gold medal – first place	2010	Iran Tose’e Karaj
Gold medal – first place	2015	Tabriz Municipality
Silver medal – second place	2016	Moqavemat Alborz
FIFA Beach Soccer World Cup
Bronze medal – third place	2007	Iran national team
Bronze medal – third place	2008	Iran national team
Asian Beach Games
Bronze medal – third place	2010	Thailand national team
International Beach Soccer Tournaments
Bronze medal – third place	2011	Thailand national team

Shahram Danehkar (born 14 September 1969) is a former Iranian beach soccer player and coach. He is a former head coach of the Iran national beach soccer team and the Thailand national beach soccer team.
