= Indonesia national beach soccer team =

International beach soccer team

Indonesia
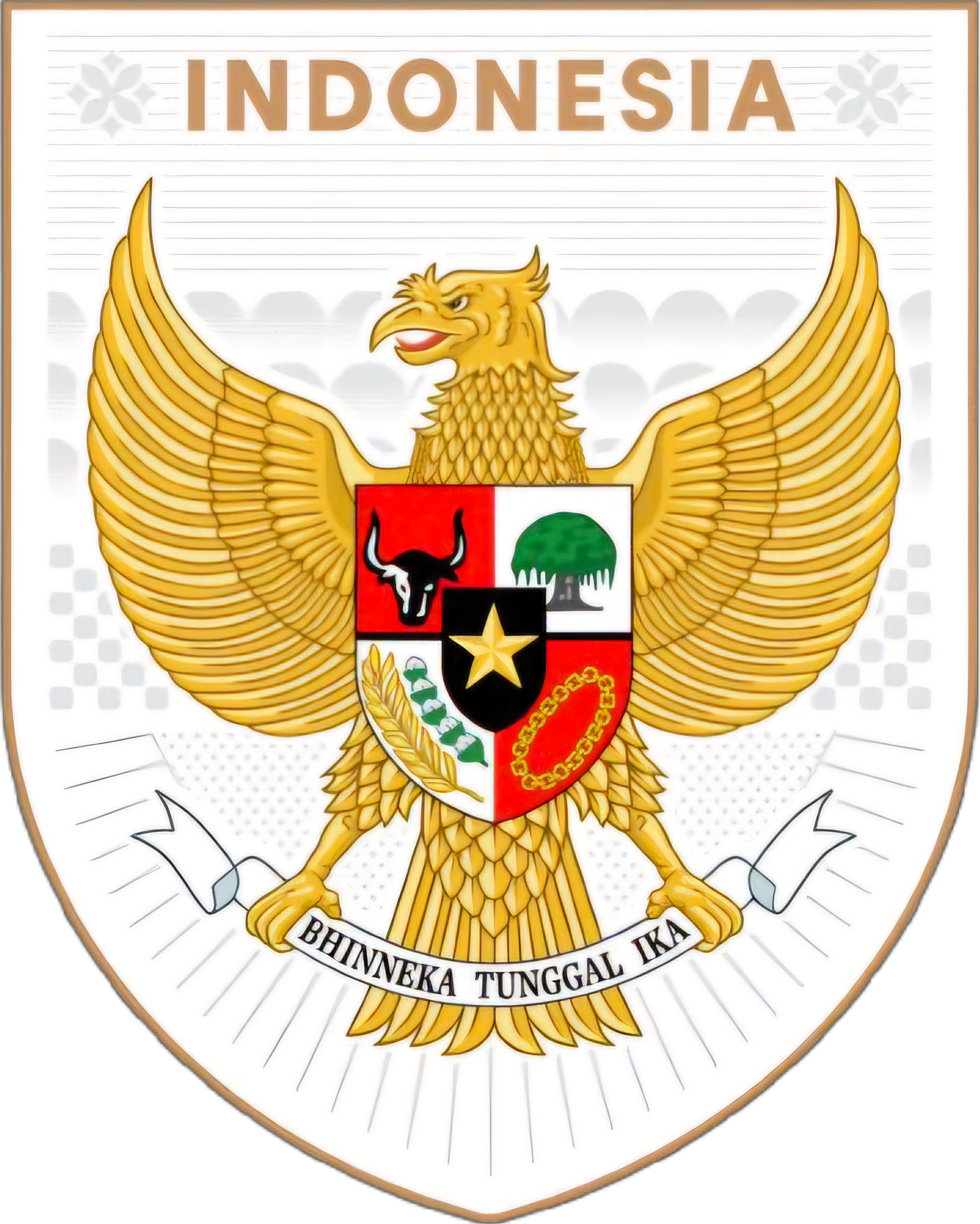
- Nickname(s): Garuda Pantai (The Beach Garuda)
- Association: PSSI through ASPI
- Confederation: AFC (Asia)
- Sub-confederation: AFF (Southeast Asia)
- Head coach: Ida Bagus Mahayasa
- Captain: Asep Triwahono
- FIFA code: IDN
- BSWW ranking: 69 ▲1 (2 September 2026)
First colours
Second colours

First international
- Indonesia 16–2 Timor-Leste (Johor, Malaysia; 26 August 2008)

Biggest win
- Indonesia 16–2 Timor-Leste (Johor, Malaysia; 26 August 2008)

Biggest defeat
- Indonesia 0–12 Lebanon (Pattaya, Thailand; 19 March 2023)

AFC Beach Soccer Asian Cup
- Appearances: 3 (first in 2011)
- Best result: Group stage (2011, 2023, 2025)

AFF Beach Soccer Championship
- Appearances: 3 (first in 2014)
- Best result: Third place (2022)

The Indonesia national beach soccer team represents Indonesia in international beach soccer competitions and is controlled by the PSSI, the governing body for football in Indonesia. In 2008, Indonesia made its first match against Timor Leste in the 2008 Raja Muda Johor Cup, Malaysia.

== Competitive record ==
=== FIFA Beach Soccer World Cup ===
FIFA Beach Soccer World Cup finals record
Host / Year	Result	Position	GP	W	W+	L	GS	GA
(Brazil) 2005	Did not participate							
(Brazil) 2006	Did not participate							
(Brazil) 2007	Did not participate							
(France) 2008	Did not participate							
(United Arab Emirates) 2009	Did not participate							
(Italy) 2011	Did not qualify							
(French Polynesia) 2013	Did not enter							
(Portugal) 2015	Did not enter							
(The Bahamas) 2017	Did not enter							
(Paraguay) 2019	Did not enter							
(Russia) 2021	Did not enter							
(United Arab Emirates) 2023	Did not qualify							
(Seychelles) 2025	Did not qualify							
Total	–	0/13	0	0	0	0	0	0

=== World Beach Games ===
World Beach Games record
Host / Year	Result	Position	GP	W	W+	L	GS	GA
(Qatar) 2019	Did not enter							
(Indonesia) 2023	Cancelled							
Total	–	0/2	0	0	0	0	0	0

=== AFC Beach Soccer Asian Cup ===
The tournament also call as FIFA Beach Soccer World Cup qualification for Asian (AFC) region.

AFC Beach Soccer Asian Cup record
Host / Year	Result	Position	GP	W	W+	L	GS	GA
(United Arab Emirates) 2006	Did not participate							
(United Arab Emirates) 2007	Did not participate							
(United Arab Emirates) 2008	Did not participate							
(United Arab Emirates) 2009	Did not participate							
(Oman) 2011	Group stage	11/11	3	0	0	3	6	18
(Qatar) 2013	Did not enter							
(Qatar) 2015	Did not enter							
(Malaysia) 2017	Did not enter							
(Thailand) 2019	Did not enter							
(Thailand) 2021	Cancelled due to COVID-19 pandemic							
(Thailand) 2023	Group stage	16/16	3	0	0	3	4	24
(Thailand) 2025	Group stage	11/16	3	1	0	2	9	22
Total	Best: Group stage	3/11	9	1	0	8	19	64

=== Asian Beach Games ===
Asian Beach Games record
Host / Year	Result	Position	GP	W	W+	L	GS	GA
(Indonesia) 2008	Quarterfinals	7/16	4	2	0	2	19	15
(Oman) 2010	Group stage	12/16	3	1	0	2	9	15
(China) 2012	Did not participate							
(Thailand) 2014	Did not participate							
(Vietnam) 2016	Did not participate							
Total	Best: Quarterfinals	2/5	7	3	0	4	28	30

=== AFF Beach Soccer Championship ===
AFF Beach Soccer Championship record
Host / Year	Result	Position	GP	W	D	L	GS	GA
(Malaysia) 2014	Group stage	5/8	3	1	0	2	15	12
(Indonesia) 2018	Fourth place	4/5	5	1	1	3	14	14
(Thailand) 2019	Did not enter							
(Thailand) 2022	Third Place	3/3	2	0	0	2	5	14
Total	Best: Third Place	3/4	10	2	2	7	34	40

== Players ==
Note: Flags indicate national team as defined under FIFA eligibility rules; some limited exceptions apply. Players may hold more than one non-FIFA nationality.

No.	Pos.	Nation	Player
1	GK	IDN	Casala Pratama
2		IDN	Reza Iqbal Hakiki
3		IDN	I Komang Sujana
4		IDN	Asep Triwahono
5		IDN	I Kadek Dwi Dian Devayana
6		IDN	I Gede Warih Sentanu
7		IDN	I Ketut Sudiartawan
8		IDN	Demon Pradik Pratama
9		IDN	I Made Adhi Kurniawan
10		IDN	Agung Teguh Seri Rejeki
11		IDN	Angga Pratama Wicaksana
12	GK	IDN	Satriyo Nugroho

== Results and fixtures ==
Keterangan

Win Draw Lost Fixture

== Honours ==
=== Continental ===
- Asian Beach Games
  - Quarter-Final: 2008

=== Regional ===
- AFF Beach Soccer Championship
  - (bronze) Third place: 2022

== See also ==
- Indonesia national football team
- Indonesia national futsal team
