= Malaysia national beach soccer team =

- Nickname: Harimau Malaysia
- Association: Football Association of Malaysia
- Confederation: AFC (Asia)
- Sub-confederation: AFF (Southeast Asia)
- Head coach: Mohd Saiful Md Noor
- Captain: Mohd Ridhwan Zainal
- Home stadium: Pantai Batu Buruk, Kuala Terengganu
- FIFA code: MAS
- BSWW ranking: 68 ▲1 (2 September 2026)
First colours
Second colours

First international
- Malaysia 2–7 United States (Copacabana beach, Brazil; 10 January 1999)

Biggest defeat
- Brazil 15–1 Malaysia (Figueira da Foz, Portugal; August 1998); Malaysia 0–14 Iran (Kuala Terengganu, Malaysia; 5 March 2017)

World Cup
- Appearances: 1
- Best result: Group Stage (1999)

AFC Beach Soccer Championship
- Appearances: 4 (first in 2017)
- Best result: Quarter final, 2019

Asian Beach Games
- Appearances: 2 (first in 2008)
- Best result: Group Stage

AFF Beach Soccer Championship
- Appearances: 4 (first in 2014)
- Best result: Winner, 2014

The Malaysia national beach soccer team represents Malaysia in international beach soccer competitions. It is controlled by the Football Association of Malaysia, the governing body for football in Malaysia.

== Current squad ==
Note: Flags indicate national team as defined under FIFA eligibility rules; some limited exceptions apply. Players may hold more than one non-FIFA nationality.

No.	Pos.	Nation	Player
1	GK		Syujak Nasir
2			Faisal Saharudin
3			Muhammad Qushairi Bin Assari
4			Norazman Bakar
5			Hafizam Rahman
6			Hasrol Ali

No.	Pos.	Nation	Player
7	MF		Faizal Rani
8	MF		Ashrey Mat Ghani
9	MF		Ridhwan Zainal
10	MF		Zulhairi Ismail
11	MF		Mohd Riduwan Bin Mohd Noor
12	MF		Mohd Nazri Bin Sulaiman

== Technical staff ==
- Team manager: (Malaysia) Mustaza Ahmad
- Head coach: (Malaysia) Mohd Saiful Md Noor
- Assistant coach: (Malaysia) Saiful Noor
- Physiotherapist: (Malaysia) Isamuddin Ali Wahid Ali

== Competitive record ==
=== Beach Soccer World Championships ===
Beach Soccer World Championships
Year	Round	Pos	Pld	W	W+	L	GF	GA	GD
(Brazil) 1995	did not enter								
(Brazil) 1996	did not enter								
(Brazil) 1997	did not enter								
(Brazil) 1998	did not enter								
(Brazil) 1999	Group stage	10th	2	0	0	2	9	22	−13
(Brazil) 2000	did not enter								
(Brazil) 2001	did not enter								
(Brazil) 2002	did not enter								
(Brazil) 2003	did not enter								
(Brazil) 2004	did not enter								
Total	-	1/10	2	0	0	2	9	22	–13

=== FIFA Beach Soccer World Cup ===
FIFA Beach Soccer World Cup										Qualification (AFC)								
Year	Round	Pos	Pld	W	W+	L	GF	GA	GD	Round	Pos	Pldt	W	W+	L	GF	GA	GD
(Brazil) 2005	did not enter									No qualification matches								
(Brazil) 2006	did not enter									did not enter								
(Brazil) 2007	did not enter									did not enter								
(France) 2008	did not enter									did not enter								
(United Arab Emirates) 2009	did not enter									did not enter								
(Italy) 2011	did not enter									did not enter								
(French Polynesia) 2013	did not enter									did not enter								
(Portugal) 2015	did not enter									did not enter								
(The Bahamas) 2017	did not qualify									Group stage	9th	4	1	0	3	10	26	-16
(Paraguay) 2019	did not qualify									Quarter finals	8th	3	1	0	2	12	13	-1
(Russia) 2021	did not qualify									Cancelled (Note: The Asian qualifiers were originally due to take place in Thailand from 18–28 March 2021. Due to the COVID-19 pandemic, they were initially postponed to between 28 April and 8 May, and were subsequently cancelled entirely in January 2021. In place of the qualifiers, the AFC handpicked their three representatives to go to the World Cup on 21 April, choosing the best-performing nations over the course of the previous three editions of the AFC Beach Soccer Championship.)								
(United Arab Emirates) 2024	did not qualify									Group stage	15th	3	0	0	3	10	25	-15
(Seychelles) 2025	did not qualify									Group stage	10th	3	1	0	2	9	11	-2
Total	-	-	-	-	-	-	-	-	-	-	4/11	13	3	1	10	41	75	-34

=== AFC Beach Soccer Championship ===
The tournament also call as FIFA Beach Soccer World Cup qualification for Asian (AFC) region.

AFC Beach Soccer Asian Cup record
Year	Round	Pos	Pld	W	W+	L	GF	GA	GD
(United Arab Emirates) 2006	did not enter								
(United Arab Emirates) 2007	did not enter								
(United Arab Emirates) 2008	did not enter								
(United Arab Emirates) 2009	did not enter								
(Oman) 2011	did not enter								
(Qatar) 2013	did not enter								
(Qatar) 2015	did not enter								
(Malaysia) 2017	Group stage	9th	4	1	0	3	10	26	-16
(Thailand) 2019	Quarter finals	8th	3	1	0	2	12	13	-1
(Thailand) 2021	Cancelled (Note: see above)								
(Thailand) 2023	Group stage	15th	3	0	0	3	10	25	-15
(Thailand) 2025	Group stage	10th	3	1	0	2	9	11	-2
Total	-	4/11	13	3	1	10	41	75	-34

=== Asian Beach Games ===
Asian Beach Games Record
Year	Result	Position	Pld	W	W+	L	GF	GA
(Indonesia) 2008	Group stage	11/16	3	1	0	2	7	14
(Oman) 2010	did not enter							
(China) 2012	did not enter							
(Thailand) 2014	Group Stage	12/13	2	0	0	2	4	11
(Vietnam) 2016	did not enter							
Total	Best: Group stage	2/5	5	1	0	4	11	25

=== AFF Beach Soccer Championship ===
Asean Championship Record
Year	Result	Position	Pld	W	D	L	GF	GA
(Malaysia) 2014	Champions	1/8	5	4	0	1	25	14
(Indonesia) 2018	Third place	3/5	5	2	1	2	15	16
(Thailand) 2019	Third place	3/5	4	2	0	2	16	18
(Thailand) 2022	Runners-up	2/3	2	1	0	1	10	5
Total	Best: Champions	4/4	16	9	1	6	66	53
