= South Korea national beach soccer team =

Republic of Korea
- Nickname(s): Taegeuk Warriors; The Red Devils; The Reds
- Association: Korea Football Association
- FIFA code: KOR
- BSWW ranking: NR (9 April 2025)
First colours
Second colours

First international
- South Korea 4–0 Kuwait (Bali, Indonesia; 19 October 2008)

Biggest win
- South Korea 4–0 Kuwait (Bali, Indonesia; 19 October 2008)

Biggest defeat
- South Korea 6–9 Oman (Bali, Indonesia; 25 October 2008)

Asian Beach Games
- Appearances: 1 (first in 2008)
- Best result: Fourth place (2008)

The South Korea national beach soccer team represented South Korea in international beach soccer and was governed by the Korea Football Association. It is not currently being managed and was officially organized only once when the first Asian Beach Games was held in 2008. Besides official record, South Korea participated in unofficial Intercontinental Cup in 1995 and 1996.

== Results ==
Win Win after extra time or penalties Loss

19 October 2008 2008 Asian Beach Games (Group C)	South Korea	4–0	Kuwait	Sanur, Indonesia
		Report

20 October 2008 2008 Asian Beach Games (Group C)	South Korea	3–4	Vietnam	Sanur, Indonesia
		Report

21 October 2008 2008 Asian Beach Games (Group C)	South Korea	3–1	Bahrain	Sanur, Indonesia
		Report

24 October 2008 2008 Asian Beach Games (Quarter-finals)	South Korea	4–4 (a.e.t.) (1–0 p)	China	Sanur, Indonesia
		Report

25 October 2008 2008 Asian Beach Games (Semi-finals)	South Korea	6–9	Oman	Sanur, Indonesia
		Report

26 October 2008 2008 Asian Beach Games (Bronze medal match)	South Korea	1–2	Bahrain	Sanur, Indonesia
		Report

== Unofficial results ==
Win Win after extra time or penalties Loss

July 1995 1995 Intercontinental Cup	South Korea	8–3	Japan	Miura, Japan
		Report

July 1995 1995 Intercontinental Cup	South Korea	3–11	Brazil	Miura, Japan
		Report

6 July 1996 1996 Intercontinental Cup	South Korea	Unknown	Italy	Okinawa, Japan
		Report

7 July 1996 1996 Intercontinental Cup	South Korea	4–6	Brazil	Okinawa, Japan
		Report

== Players ==
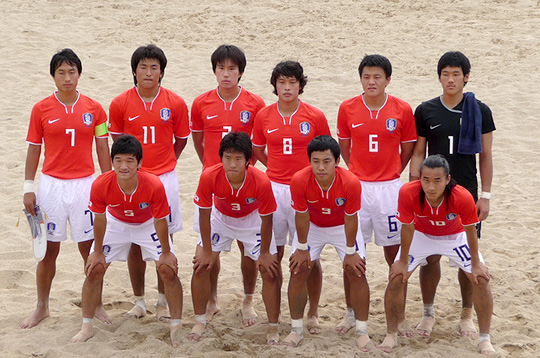
South Korea national team at the 2008 Asian Beach Games.

The following players and staff members were called up for the 2008 Asian Beach Games.

Note: Flags indicate national team as defined under FIFA eligibility rules; some limited exceptions apply. Players may hold more than one non-FIFA nationality.

No.	Pos.	Nation	Player
1	GK	(South Korea) KOR	Park Jun-hyuk
2	DF	(South Korea) KOR	Lee Ho-chang
3	MF	(South Korea) KOR	Yoo Sung-ryong
5	DF	(South Korea) KOR	Lim Jung-ha
6	DF	(South Korea) KOR	Yoon Sin-young

No.	Pos.	Nation	Player
7	DF	(South Korea) KOR	Kang Eun-seok (captain)
8	MF	(South Korea) KOR	Lee Han-soo
9	MF	(South Korea) KOR	Sin Han-kook
10	FW	(South Korea) KOR	Choi Kyung-jin
11	FW	(South Korea) KOR	Shim Jong-bo

Head coach: Park Mal-bong
Assistant coach: Kim Hae-gook

== Competitive record ==
=== Asian Beach Games ===
Asian Beach Games record
Year	Result	Pld	W	W+	L	GF	GA
(Indonesia) 2008	Fourth place	6	2	1	3	21	20
(Oman) 2010	Did not enter						
(China) 2012	Did not enter						
(Thailand) 2014	Did not enter						
(Vietnam) 2016	Did not enter						
Total	Fourth place	6	2	1	3	21	20

== See also ==
- Korea Football Association
