= Australia women's national futsal team =

Represents Australia in women's international futsal

Australia
- Shirt badge/Association crest
- Association: Football Federation Australia
- Confederation: AFC (Asia)
- Head coach: Miles Downie
- FIFA code: AUS
- FIFA ranking: 58 ▲8 (8 May 2026)
- Highest FIFA ranking: 59 (April 2025)
- Lowest FIFA ranking: 68 (August 2025)
| Home colours | Away colours |

First international
- Australia 6–1 Turkmenistan (Tashkent, Uzbekistan; 11 January 2025)

Biggest win
- Australia 6–1 Turkmenistan (Tashkent, Uzbekistan; 11 January 2025); Kuwait 0–5 Australia (Tashkent, Uzbekistan; 13 January 2025); Australia 6–1 Myanmar (Nakhon Ratchasima, Thailand; 25 February 2026)

Biggest defeat
- China 3–1 Australia (Hohhot, China; 6 May 2025); Australia 1–3 Uzbekistan (Hohhot, China; 8 May 2025)

AFC Women's Futsal Asian Cup
- Appearances: 1 (First in 2025)
- Best result: Group stage (2025)

ASEAN Women's Futsal Championship
- Appearances: 1 (First in 2026)
- Best result: (silver) Runners-up (2026)

The Australia women's national futsal team represents Australia in women's international futsal. The team is controlled by the governing body for association football in Australia, Football Federation Australia (FFA), which is currently a member of the Asian Football Confederation (AFC) and the regional ASEAN Football Federation (AFF) since leaving the Oceania Football Confederation (OFC) in 2006.

== History ==
A women's futsal program was activated by Football Federation Australia in 2024. They entered the qualification tournament for the 2025 AFC Women's Futsal Asian Cup with Miles Downie named as head coach. They won 6–1 in their first international against Turkmenistan.

== Players ==
The following players were named to the squad for the 2025 AFC Women's Futsal Asian Cup qualification from 11 to 19 January 2025.

| No. | Pos. | Player | Date of birth (age) | Caps | Goals | Club |
|---|---|---|---|---|---|---|
| 1 | GK | Sarah Easthope | 29 May 1996 (age 30) | | 0 | (Football Australia) Dural Warriors |
| 2 | FP | Nikkita Fazzari | | | 5 | (Football Australia) Dural Warriors |
| 3 | FP | Gisella Pipino | | | 1 | (Football Australia) Eastern Suburbs Hakoah |
| 4 | FP | Alexia Karrys-Stahl | | | 0 | (Football Australia) UTS Northside |
| 5 | GK | Jessica McLean | | | 2 | (Football Australia) Crusaders |
| 6 | FP | Clare Holder | | | 0 | (Football Australia) Eastern Suburbs Hakoah |
| 7 | FP | Jessica Au | | | 1 | (Football Australia) Melbourne AKU |
| 8 | FP | Daisy Arrowsmith | | | 1 | (Football Australia) UTS Northside |
| 9 | FP | Marianna Tabain | 19 October 1992 (age 33) | | 2 | (Football Australia) Cockburn Wolves |
| 10 | FP | Trudy Camilleri | 16 September 1991 (age 34) | | 3 | (Football Australia) Mascot Vipers |
| 11 | FP | Halle Smit | | | 0 | (Football Australia) UTS Northside |
| 12 | FP | Zoee Spadano | | | 0 | (Football Australia) South Perth Alliance |
| 13 | FP | Meaghan McElligott | | | 0 | (Football Australia) Crusaders |
| 14 | FP | Claudia Fruscalzo | | | 1 | (Football Australia) Fitzroy Tigers |

== Results and fixtures ==
=== 2026 ===
| 24 February ASEAN Championship GS | Vietnam | 0–2 | Australia | Nakhon Ratchasima, Thailand |
| 13:30 UTC+7 | | Report | Fruscalzo 23'; Fazzari 39' | Stadium: Terminal 21 Korat; Referee: Tita Rosita (Indonesia) |

| 25 February ASEAN Championship GS | Australia | 6–1 | Myanmar | Nakhon Ratchasima, Thailand |
| 13:30 UTC+7 | Karrys-Stahl 14', 19'; Holder 14', 24'; Fazzari 25'; Camilleri 33' | Report | Ya Min Thant Zin 13' | Stadium: Terminal 21 Korat; Referee: Khampasong Xayavongsy (Laos) |

| 26 February ASEAN Championship GS | Philippines | 1–1 | Australia | Nakhon Ratchasima, Thailand |
| 16:00 UTC+7 | Borres 40' | Report | Holder 40' | Stadium: Terminal 21 Korat; Referee: Khampasong Xayavongsy (Laos) |

| 28 February ASEAN Championship SF | Australia | 3–2 (a.e.t.) | Indonesia | Nakhon Ratchasima, Thailand |
| 15:00 UTC+7 | Holder 10'; Fitry Amelya 31' (o.g.); Camilleri 50' | Report | Insyafadya Salsabillah 9'; Dhea Febrina Bangun 29' | Stadium: Terminal 21 Korat; Referee: Khampasong Xayavongsy (Laos) |

| 2 March ASEAN Championship F | Australia | 4–5 | Thailand | Nakhon Ratchasima, Thailand |
| 18:30 UTC+7 | Holder 17'; Asiprapha 23' (o.g.); Karrys-Stahl 24'; Nattamon 40' (o.g.) | | Sangrawee 5'; Jenjira 19'; Darika 31', 35', 36' | Stadium: Terminal 21 Korat |

== Tournament records ==
*Draws include knockout matches decided on penalty kicks.
**Gold background colour indicates that the tournament was won.
***Red border colour indicates tournament was held on home soil.

=== FIFA Futsal Women's World Cup ===
FIFA Futsal Women's World Cup record
| Year | Round | Position | GP | W | D | L | GS | GA |
|---|---|---|---|---|---|---|---|---|
| (Philippines) 2025 | Did not qualify | | | | | | | |
| Total | – | 0/1 | 0 | 0 | 0 | 0 | 0 | 0 |

=== AFC Women's Futsal Asian Cup ===
AFC Women's Futsal Asian Cup record
| Year | Round | Position | GP | W | D | L | GS | GA |
|---|---|---|---|---|---|---|---|---|
| (China) 2025 | Group stage | 10/12 | 3 | 0 | 0 | 3 | 2 | 7 |
| Total | Group stage | 1/1 | 3 | 0 | 0 | 3 | 2 | 7 |

=== ASEAN Women's Futsal Championship ===
ASEAN Women's Futsal Championship record
| Year | Round | Position | GP | W | D | L | GS | GA |
|---|---|---|---|---|---|---|---|---|
| (Philippines) 2024 | Did not enter | | | | | | | |
| (Thailand) 2026 | Runners-up | | 5 | 3 | 1 | 1 | 16 | 9 |
| Total | – | 1/2 | 5 | 3 | 1 | 1 | 16 | 9 |

== See also ==
- Futsal in Australia
- Australia men's national futsal team
