= Trudy Camilleri =

Australian football player

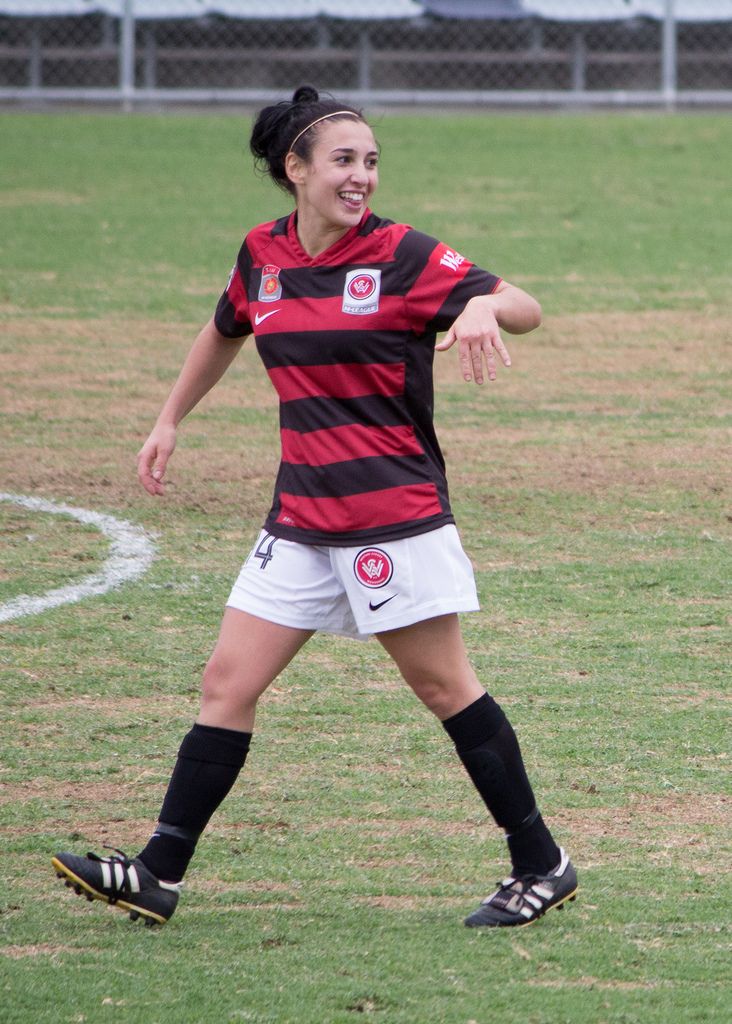
- Camilleri playing for Western Sydney Wanderers in 2012

Personal information
- Full name: Trudy Camilleri
- Date of birth: 16 September 1991 (age 35)
- Place of birth: Liverpool, Australia
- Height: 1.77 m (5 ft 10 in)
- Position: Midfielder

Team information
- Current team: Mascot Vipers

Senior career*
Years	Team	Apps	(Gls)
2008–2010	Central Coast Mariners	34	(13)
2012–2013	Western Sydney Wanderers	35	(10)
2013–2016	Sydney FC	94	(21)
2023	Bankstown City Lions	15	(1)

International career
2008	Australia U23	0	(0)
2025–	Australia (futsal)		
- * Club domestic league appearances and goals

Trudy Camilleri (born 16 September 1991) is an Australian-Maltese former professional soccer player. She previously played for Sydney FC, Central Coast Mariners and Western Sydney Wanderers in the Australian W-League. She also plays futsal.

Trudy made her W-League debut for Central Coast Mariners against Melbourne Victory on Saturday, 25 October 2008. Trudy then made her scoring debut in Round 2 against Perth Glory, scoring a goal to assist the Mariners to a 3–1 win at home.

In October 2012 it was announced that Camilleri had signed for Western Sydney Wanderers in the Westfield W-League in Australia for the 2012–13 season. She made her Wanderers debut against Adelaide on 20 October 2012.

== Personal life ==
Following her retirement from football, Camilleri started teaching automotive repair with TAFE NSW.

== Photos ==
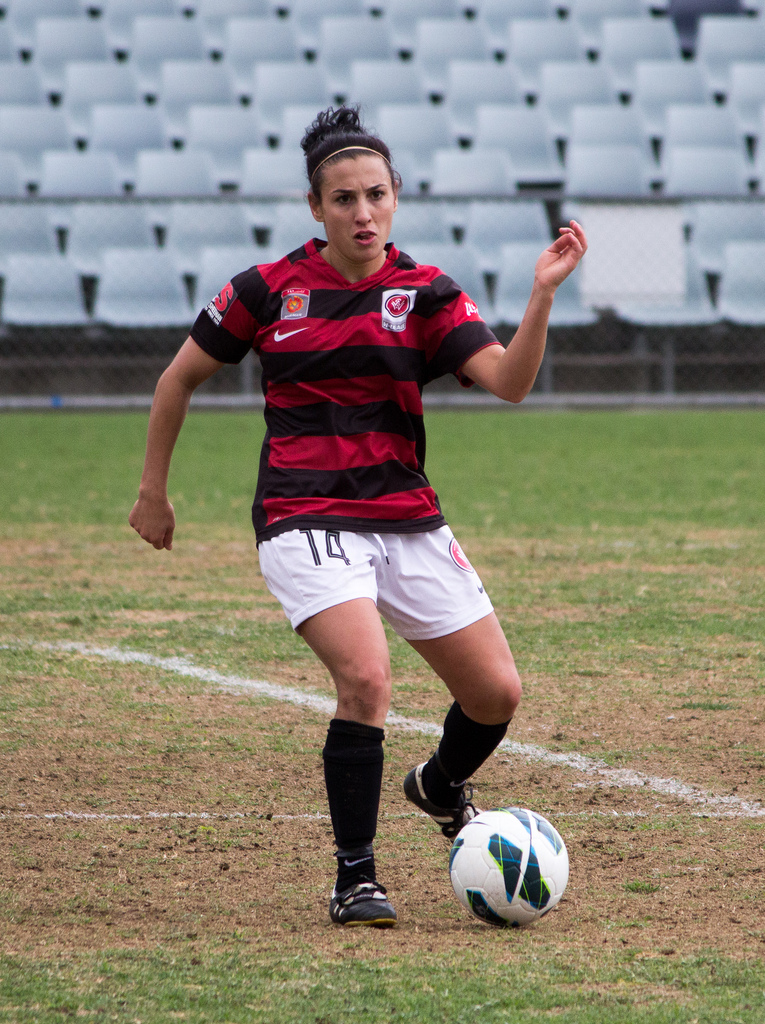

== International goals ==
=== Futsal ===
No.	Date	Venue	Opponent	Score	Result	Competition
1.	11 January 2025	Tashkent, Uzbekistan	Turkmenistan	2–0	6–1	2025 AFC Women's Futsal Asian Cup qualification
2.	11 January 2025	Tashkent, Uzbekistan	Turkmenistan	6–1	6–1	2025 AFC Women's Futsal Asian Cup qualification
3.	13 January 2025	Tashkent, Uzbekistan	Kuwait	4–0	5–0	2025 AFC Women's Futsal Asian Cup qualification
4.	25 February 2026	Nakhon Ratchasima, Thailand	Myanmar	6–1	6–1	2026 ASEAN Women's Futsal Championship
5.	28 February 2026	Nakhon Ratchasima, Thailand	Indonesia	3–2	3–2 (a.e.t.)	2026 ASEAN Women's Futsal Championship
