= Beach soccer at the 2008 Asian Beach Games =

- Venue: Mertasari Beach
- Dates: 18–26 October 2008

Beach soccer at the 2008 Asian Beach Games were held from 18 October to 26 October 2008 in Bali, Indonesia. Oman won the gold medal.

== Medalists ==
Event	Gold	Silver	Bronze
Men	Oman; Mohammed Al-Mukhaini; Badar Al-Habsi; Ishaq Al-Mas; Salim Al-Habsi; Yaqoob Rabia; Salim Al-Abri; Khalid Al-Dhanki; Khalid Al-Rajhi; Faisal Al-Balushi; Waleed Al-Mahrouqi	United Arab Emirates; Karim Al-Balooshi; Bakhit Saad; Saeed Ali Saeed; Mohamed Bashir; Ali Hassan Karim; Qambar Sadeqi; Ibrahim Al-Balooshi; Rami Al-Mesaabi; Abbas Hussain; Humaid Al-Balooshi	Bahrain; Isa Saleh Ali; Ebrahim Hasan; Salah Salman Hasan; Mohammed Sabt Abbas; Ali Habib; Hesam Jasim Najim; Mahmood Yousif; Ameer Mohamed; Yaqoob Mohamed; Sadeq Marhoon; Ebrahim Abdulla Salman

== Results ==
=== Preliminaries ===
==== Group A ====
Pos	Team	Pld	W	W+	L	GF	GA	GD	Pts
1	Uzbekistan	3	3	0	0	17	6	+11	9
2	Indonesia	3	2	0	1	16	8	+8	6
3	Timor-Leste	3	1	0	2	8	22	−14	3
4	Qatar	3	0	0	3	10	15	−5	0

Source: Official website
18 October
8:30

Indonesia	9–1	Timor-Leste

Mertasari Beach, Bali
Referee: Faisal Ahmed (United Arab Emirates)

19 October
14:30

Uzbekistan	4–3	Qatar

Mertasari Beach, Bali
Referee: Li Ke (China)

20 October
9:45

Indonesia	6–3	Qatar

Mertasari Beach, Bali
Referee: Waleed Ali Yousef (United Arab Emirates)

21 October
14:30

Uzbekistan	9–2	Timor-Leste

Mertasari Beach, Bali
Referee: Farshid Haghighatjoo (Iran)

22 October
8:30

Qatar	4–5	Timor-Leste

Mertasari Beach, Bali
Referee: Mohammad Saleh Khatir (Iran)

23 October
9:45

Indonesia	1–4	Uzbekistan

Mertasari Beach, Bali
Referee: István Mészáros (Hungary)

==== Group B ====
Pos	Team	Pld	W	W+	L	GF	GA	GD	Pts
1	United Arab Emirates	3	3	0	0	17	4	+13	9
2	Oman	3	2	0	1	12	8	+4	6
3	Thailand	3	0	1	2	7	11	−4	2
4	Myanmar	3	0	0	3	3	16	−13	0

Source: Official website
18 October
9:45

United Arab Emirates	7–1	Myanmar

Mertasari Beach, Bali
Referee: István Mészáros (Hungary)

19 October
9:45

Thailand	2–5	Oman

Mertasari Beach, Bali
Referee: Masahiro Sakurada (Japan)

20 October
8:30

United Arab Emirates	4–1	Thailand

Mertasari Beach, Bali
Referee: Cho Hyun-jae (South Korea)

21 October
15:45

Thailand	4–2 (a.e.t.)	Myanmar

Mertasari Beach, Bali
Referee: Hassan Kioumarsi (Iran)

22 October
9:45

Oman	5–0	Myanmar

Mertasari Beach, Bali
Referee: Cho Hyun-jae (South Korea)

23 October
14:30

United Arab Emirates	6–2	Oman

Mertasari Beach, Bali
Referee: Farshid Haghighatjoo (Iran)

==== Group C ====
Pos	Team	Pld	W	W+	L	GF	GA	GD	Pts
1	South Korea	3	2	0	1	10	5	+5	6
2	Bahrain	3	2	0	1	9	4	+5	6
3	Vietnam	3	2	0	1	12	12	0	6
4	Kuwait	3	0	0	3	7	17	−10	0

Source: Official website
18 October
11:00

Bahrain	3–0	Vietnam

Mertasari Beach, Bali
Referee: Farshid Haghighatjoo (Iran)

19 October
9:45

South Korea	4–0	Kuwait

Mertasari Beach, Bali
Referee: Faisal Ahmed (United Arab Emirates)

20 October
11:00

Bahrain	5–1	Kuwait

Mertasari Beach, Bali
Referee: István Mészáros (Hungary)

20 October
14:30

South Korea	3–4	Vietnam

Mertasari Beach, Bali
Referee: Masahiro Sakurada (Japan)

21 October
8:30

Bahrain	1–3	South Korea

Mertasari Beach, Bali
Referee: Faisal Ahmed (United Arab Emirates)

22 October
14:30

Kuwait	6–8	Vietnam

Mertasari Beach, Bali
Referee: István Mészáros (Hungary)

==== Group D ====
Pos	Team	Pld	W	W+	L	GF	GA	GD	Pts
1	Iran	3	3	0	0	19	8	+11	9
2	China	3	1	1	1	8	8	0	5
3	Malaysia	3	1	0	2	7	14	−7	3
4	India	3	0	0	3	9	13	−4	0

Source: Official website
19 October
8:30

Iran	6–1	Malaysia

Mertasari Beach, Bali
Referee: István Mészáros (Hungary)

19 October
14:30

China	1–1 (a.e.t.)	India
Penalties
	3–2

Mertasari Beach, Bali
Referee: Waleed Ali Yousef (United Arab Emirates)

20 October
15:45

Iran	7–4	India

Mertasari Beach, Bali
Referee: Faisal Ahmed (United Arab Emirates)

21 October
9:45

China	4–1	Malaysia

Mertasari Beach, Bali
Referee: Kamol Maparsop (Thailand)

22 October
15:45

India	4–5	Malaysia

Mertasari Beach, Bali
Referee: Li Ke (China)

23 October
8:30

Iran	6–3	China

Mertasari Beach, Bali
Referee: Masahiro Sakurada (Japan)

=== Knockout round ===
Quarterfinals
24 October
United Arab Emirates	7
Indonesia	3
24 October
Iran	1
Bahrain	3
24 October
Uzbekistan	1
Oman	7
24 October
South Korea (p)	4 (1)
China	4 (0)

Semifinals
25 October
United Arab Emirates	5
Bahrain	2
25 October
Oman	9
South Korea	6

Final
26 October
United Arab Emirates	1
Oman	3
3rd place
26 October
Bahrain	2
South Korea	1

==== Quarterfinals ====
24 October
9:00

United Arab Emirates	7–3	Indonesia

Mertasari Beach, Bali

24 October
10:15

Uzbekistan	1–7	Oman

Mertasari Beach, Bali

24 October
14:30

Iran	1–3	Bahrain

Mertasari Beach, Bali

24 October
15:45

South Korea	4–4 (a.e.t.)	China
Penalties
	1–0

Mertasari Beach, Bali
Referee: Faisal Ahmed (United Arab Emirates)

==== Semifinals ====
25 October
9:00

United Arab Emirates	5–2	Bahrain

Mertasari Beach, Bali
Referee: Li Ke (China)

25 October
10:15

Oman	9–6	South Korea

Mertasari Beach, Bali
Referee: Masahiro Sakurada (Japan)

==== 3rd place ====
26 October
9:00

Bahrain	2–1	South Korea

Mertasari Beach, Bali

==== Final ====
26 October
10:15

United Arab Emirates	1–3	Oman

Mertasari Beach, Bali
Referee: István Mészáros (Hungary)
