= ASEAN Beach Soccer Championship =

- Organiser(s): AFF
- Founded: 2014
- Region: Southeast Asia
- Current champions: Thailand (2nd title)
- Most championships: Thailand (2 titles)
- 2022 AFF Beach Soccer Championship

The ASEAN Beach Soccer Championship (formerly AFF Beach Soccer Championship) is an international beach soccer competition contested by Southeast Asian men's national teams who are members of the ASEAN Football Federation (AFF).

== Results ==
Year	Location	Final			Third place play-off		
Year	Location	Winners	Score	Runners-up	Third place	Score	Fourth place
2014 details	Kuantan, Malaysia	Malaysia	6–4	Vietnam	Thailand	4–1	Laos
2018 details	Bali, Indonesia	Vietnam	6–4	Thailand	Malaysia	2–1	Indonesia
2019 details	Chonburi, Thailand	Thailand	4–2	Vietnam	Malaysia	4–4 (a.e.t.) (6–5 (p))	Afghanistan
2022 details	Pattaya, Thailand	Thailand	3–1	Malaysia	Indonesia	—	

== Teams reaching top four ==
Team	Titles	Runners-up	Third place	Fourth place
Thailand	2 (2019, 2022)	1 (2018)	1 (2014)	–
Vietnam	1 (2018)	2 (2014, 2019)	–	–
Malaysia	1 (2014)	1 (2022)	2 (2018, 2019)	–
Indonesia	–	–	1 (2022)	1 (2018)
Laos	–	–	–	1 (2014)
Afghanistan	–	–	–	1 (2019)
