= BSWW Tour =

Series of sporting events

The BSWW Tour is a series of international events in beach soccer. It is organised by Beach Soccer Worldwide (BSWW), an organization responsible for promotion and development of beach soccer sport. BSWW Tour is an international exhibition tour in beach soccer allowing teams to practice and compete in beach soccer as well as to allow spectators to see the sport. The tour holds events in different locations around the world.

First started in 1996, the series were called the Pro Beach Soccer Tour (PBST) until 2004 when partnership with FIFA started.

== Divisions ==
=== Division 1 ===
Spain
France
Portugal
Brazil
Austria
Italy

=== Division 2 ===
England
Switzerland
Netherlands
United Arab Emirates
Morocco
Belgium

== 1993 unofficial ==
- 1st Miami Cup Nov. in Miami Beach, USA

Brazil 10-3 USA (United States)
Argentina - Italy

Third place match: (United States) USA / Italy ?

Final Brazil 2-1 Argentina

== 1994 unofficial ==
- Friendly Match
- July in Hermosa Beach, USA

Brazil 5-3 USA (United States)

== 1995 unofficial ==
- 2nd Miami Cup June 2–4 in Miami Beach, USA

(United States) USA 7-6 Argentina [OT; on pen]
Brazil 13-9 Mexico
Mexico 4-3 USA (United States)
Brazil 2-1 Argentina
Argentina 3-2 Mexico
Brazil 10-3 USA (United States)
[5 goals of Zico]

Table:
1. Brazil 3 3 0 25-13 6
2. Argentina 3 1 2 10-11 2
3. Mexico 3 1 2 15-19 2
4. (United States) USA 3 1 2 13-20 2

- Intercontinental Cup July 1995 in Miura, Japan

Semifinals
South Korea 8-3 Japan
Brazil 9-4 Argentina

Third place match
Argentina 13-2 Japan

Final
Brazil 11-3 South Korea

== 1996 ==
02/03/1996 Buenos Aires (Argentina)Argentina 5-12 Brazil Friendly Match 1996

- Copa del Sol March in Buenos Aires

Argentina 5-12 Brazil

- World tour of Brazil June 12–13 in Brighton

(United States) USA 3-6 Brazil
Italy 3-12 Brazil

- World tour of Brazil June in Marseille

Italy 6-9 Brazil
(United States) USA 2-3 Brazil

- World tour of Brazil July in La Panne

(United States) USA 4-9 Brazil
Italy 4-9 Brazil

- World tour of Brazil July in Alicante

Italy 2-8 Brazil
(United States) USA 0-4 Brazil

- World tour of Brazil July in Rotterdam

Netherlands 4-13 Brazil
Italy 4-3 Brazil

- World tour of Brazil Aug in Budva, Yugoslavia

England 1-13 Brazil
Italy 4-5 Brazil

- World tour of Brazil Nov in Kuala Lumpur

Malaysia 1-14 Brazil
Italy 3-5 Brazil

- Intercontinental Cup July 1996 in Okinawa, Japan

Semifinals

Brazil 15-2 Japan
South Korea - Italy

Third place match
Japan / Italy

Final
Brazil 6-4 South Korea

== 1997 ==
- 3rd Miami Cup April 12–13 in Miami Beach, United States

Brazil 7-4 Argentina
(United States) USA - Spain

Third place match: Argentina 2-3 Spain
Final: Brazil 8-7 USA (United States)

- World tour of Brazil May 16–17 in Kuala Lumpur

Malaysia 4-10 Brazil
(United States) USA 2-4 Brazil

- World tour of Brazil July 12–13 in Travemünde

(United States) USA 3-10 Brazil
Italy 1-5 Brazil

- World tour of Brazil July 19–20 in Budva, Yugoslavia

Spain 2-4 Brazil
(Federal Republic of Yugoslavia) Yugoslavia 2-5 Brazil

- World tour of Brazil July 26–27 in Alicante

(United States) USA 3-5 Brazil
Spain 6-8 Brazil

- BSWW tour Aug 20-27 in Shirako, Japan

Brazil 13-5 France
Brazil 11-1 Canada
Brazil 5-2 Uruguay
(United States) USA - Portugal
(United States) USA - Argentina
(United States) USA - Japan

Semifinals
Brazil 13-4 Portugal
(United States) USA - France

Third place match: Portugal - France

Final: Brazil 9-5 USA (United States)

- Gala match Sep 21 in Monte-Carlo

(Monaco) Prince Albert Sel. 7-5 Spain

== 1998 ==
- 20/05/1998 Kuala Lumpur (Malaysia) Malaysia 3-6 Brazil Friendly Match 1998
- 21/05/1998 Kuala Lumpur (Malaysia) Malaysia 4-7 Brazil Friendly Match 1998
- 30/05/1998 Oviedo (Spain) Spain 4-7 Brazil Friendly Match 1998
- 31/05/1998 Madrid (Spain) Spain 2-1 Brazil Friendly Match 1998
- 20/09/1998 Monte Carlo (Monaco) Brazil 4-2 Portugal Friendly Match 1998
- World tour of Brazil May 22–23 in Kuala Lumpur

Malaysia 3-6 Brazil
Malaysia 4-7 Brazil

- May in Oviedo

Spain 4-7 Brazil

- May 27 in Madrid

(Europe) Europa Sel. 2-7 Brazil
Spain 2-1 Brazil

- Gala matches Sep 19-20 in Monte-Carlo

(Monaco) Prince Albert Sel. 9-14 Brazil
Portugal 2-4 Brazil
(Monaco) Prince Albert Sel. 2-6 Yugoslavia (Federal Republic of Yugoslavia)

- Telekom Cup Dec 4-5 in Wien - Austria

Germany 10-6 Austria
(Federal Republic of Yugoslavia) Yugoslavia 7-4

Third place match: Austria 4-2 Italy
Final: (Federal Republic of Yugoslavia) Yugoslavia 6-4 Germany

== 1999 ==
21/09/1999 Monte Carlo (Monaco) Brazil 7-5 France Friendly Match 1999

- Pré-mundial Jan 6-7 in Puenta del Este - Argentina

Third place match: Argentina 3-2 Portugal

Final: Brazil 5-4 Uruguay

- World Series Sept 3-5 in Alicante, Spain

(United States) USA 4-2 Japan
Brazil 11-3 South Africa
Portugal 5-3 France
Spain 9-2 Italy

Semifinals 5-8
Japan 7-3 South Africa
France 8-7 Italy

Semifinals 1-4
Brazil 7-1 USA (United States)
Spain 6-2 Portugal

Seventh place match: Italy 6-5 South Africa
Fifth place match: France 7-4 Japan
Third place match: Portugal 3-1 USA (United States)
Final: Brazil 7-1 Spain

- Gala match Sep 19-21 in Monte-Carlo

(Monaco) Prince Albert Sel. 5-7 Brazil
France 5-7 Brazil

== 2000 ==
- Copa do Descobrimento March in Porto Seguro, Brazil

Brazil 11-2 Portugal
Spain 10-2 France
France 6-5 Portugal
Brazil 4-0 Spain
Spain 5-2 Portugal
Brazil 11-10 France

Table:
1. Brazil 3 3 0 0 26-12 9
2. Spain 3 2 0 1 15- 8 6
3. France 3 1 0 2 18-26 3
4. Portugal 3 0 0 3 9-22 0

- BSWW tour April 12–14 in Dubai, United Arab Emirates

Spain 3-1 Italy
Brazil 12-7 France
France 7-5 Spain
Brazil 7-1 Italy
France 6-5 Italy
Spain 5-4 Brazil

Table:
1. Brazil 3 2 0 1 23-13 6
2. Spain 3 2 0 1 13-12 6
3. France 3 2 0 1 20-22 6
4. Italy 3 0 0 3 7-16 0

- BSWW tour July 14–16 in Alanya - Turkey

Germany 6-5 Turkey
Brazil 11-1 Spain
Spain 6-5 Turkey
Brazil 14-0 Germany
Spain 10-4 Germany
Brazil 14-5 Turkey

Table:
1. Brazil 3 3 0 0 9
2. Spain 3 2 0 1 6
3. Germany 3 1 0 2 3
4. Turkey 3 0 0 3 0

== 2001 ==
- Intercontinental Cup Jan 12-14 at Parque Villa Lobos in São Paulo, Brazil

Brazil 11-3 Turkey
(United States) USA - Italy
Brazil 12-1 Italy
(United States) USA - Turkey
Turkey 7-5 Italy
Brazil 6-2 USA (United States)

1. Brazil
2. (United States) USA
3. Turkey
4. Italy

- BSWW tour April 18–20 in Dubai, UAE

France 7-3 UAE (United Arab Emirates)
Italy 2-0 Spain
Germany 3-2 England
France 4-3 Italy
(United Arab Emirates) UAE 8-5 England
Spain 7-2 Germany
Germany 9-3 UAE (United Arab Emirates)
Italy 5-1 England
France 6-4 Spain

Table:
1. France 3 3 0 0 9
2. Italy 3 2 0 1 6
3. Germany 3 2 0 1 6
4. Spain 3 1 0 2 3
5. (United Arab Emirates) UAE 3 1 0 2 3
6. England 3 0 0 3 0

- World League June 29 to July 1 in Acapulco, Mexico

Brazil 3-2 Portugal
Spain - Mexico
Brazil 4-2 Spain
Portugal - Mexico
Brazil 5-3 Mexico
Portugal - Spain

Winner: Brazil

- BSWW tour Dec 15-16 in Lyon, France

Brazil 11-5 Spain
France 6-4 Argentina

Third place match: Argentina 5-4 Spain

Final: Brazil 8-2 France

- Gala match May 12 in Bangkok, Thailand

France 6-5 Thailand

- Gala matches Sep 2-3 in Monte-Carlo

(Monaco) Prince Albert Sel. 6-6 Scandinavia [OT; 2-1 on pen]
Portugal 13-5 Scandinavia
Spain 6-5 Scandinavia [OT]

== 2002 ==
- BSWW tour Aug 24-25 in Knokke - Belgium

France 9-4 Belgium
Germany 9-7 Italy

Third place match: Belgium 8-4 Italy

Final: France 4-2 Germany

== 2003 ==
- BSWW tour July 20–21 in Athinai

Greece 4-8 Brazil
Greece 3-14 Brazil

== 2004 ==
- Trophée des Arènes June 4–6 in Palavas (Montpellier), France

Portugal - Switzerland
Spain - France
Portugal - France
Spain - Switzerland
Portugal - Spain
France - Switzerland

Winner: Portugal

- BSWW tour June 19–20 in Corsica, France

Italy 6-4 Switzerland
Belgium 8-7 France [OT]

Third place match: France 11-5 Switzerland

Final: Belgium 8-4 Italy

- France All Star Game Oct 10 in Bercy POBB, Paris

PSG Legends 4-3 FC Porto Legends
France All Star 5-5 Dream Team
Europe Sel. 3-7 Brazil

== 2005 ==
- BSWW tour Jan 22-23 in Amnéville, France

Semifinals Brazil 10-2 Portugal
France 7-6 Switzerland

Third place match: Switzerland 7-6 Portugal [OT]

Final: Brazil 13-10 France

- UNICEF Cup Aug 6-7 in Scheveningen, Netherlands

Semifinals
Germany 9-5 Turkey
Netherlands 5-4 England

Third place match
Turkey 9-6 England

Final
Germany 5-4 Netherlands

- BSWW tour August 17–19 in Bastia (Corsica, France)

Brazil 5-3 Spain
Norway 3-1 France
Spain 4-3 France
Brazil 11-2 Norway
Spain 5-3 Norway
Brazil 5-1 France

Winner: Brazil

- BSWW tour August 24–26 in Ajaccio (Corsica, France)

Brazil 8-3 Spain
France 7-2 Norway
France 8-2 Spain
Brazil 12-3 Norway
Spain 4-0 Norway
Brazil 5-3 France

Winner: Brazil

- BSWW tour Jan 15 at Praia de Jacarecica in Maceió, Alagoas, Brazil

Brazil 6-4 World Selection

== 2006 ==
- BSWW tour June 21–23 in Bern

Hungary 6-5 Switzerland
Hungary 10-4 Belgium
Hungary 9-8 Germany
Switzerland 8-2 Belgium
Switzerland 10-4 Germany
Belgium 6-5 Germany

Winner: Hungary

- BSWW tour June 23–25 in Birmingham

Portugal 12-3 Netherlands
France 6-5 England
France 7-6 Netherlands [OT]
Portugal 7-4 England
France 8-7 Portugal
England 7-5 Netherlands

Winner: France

- BSWW tour Oct 7-8 in St-Pierre de la Reunion

Italy 3-2 Reunion (Réunion) [OT]
France 15-4 Madagascar

Third place match: (Réunion) Reunion 12-4 Madagascar

Final: France 3-3 Italy [OT; 3-2 pen]

Friendly match Oct 6 France 6-9 Reunion (Réunion)

== 2007 ==
- BSWW tour Jan 14 at Enseada Beach in Guarujá, Brazil

Brazil 7-6 World Selection

- Nations Cup March 9–11 at Enseada Beach in Guarujá, Brazil

France 7-2 Peru
Brazil 8-0 Mexico
France 5-1 Mexico
Brazil 9-2 Peru
Mexico 4-3 Peru
Brazil 9-2 France

Winner:Brazil

- BSWW tour May 6 in Tarragona (Playa de l'Arrabassada)

Brazil 5-4 European All-Stars (Europe)

- BSWW tour June 1 in Netanya, Israel

Israel 6-5 England

- BSWW tour June 15–17 in Winterthur (Wachter Areal), Switzerland

Portugal 6-5 England
Switzerland 13-1 Austria

Third place match: Austria 4-3 England

Final: Switzerland 4-1 Portugal

- BSWW tour Aug 9-10 in Netanya, Israel

Germany 4-3 France
Israel 6-3 Turkey

Third place match: France 6-4 Turkey

Final: Israel 4-3 Germany

- BSWW tour Aug 17 in Zürich (Home of the FIFA), Switzerland

Switzerland 5-10 Brazil

- BSWW tour Dec 12 at Clube Escola Édson Arantes do Nascimento (Pelézão), Brazil

Brazil 5-0 World Selection

== 2008 ==
- BSWW tour Jan 18, 19 and 20, in Guaruja (São Paulo), Brazil

Brazil 4-5 Paraguay
Brazil 7-4 Paraguay
Brazil 4-5 Paraguay

- Rock'n Beach Soccer Jan 18-19 in Metz, France

Portugal 8-5 Spain
France 5-6 Europa Sel. (Europe) [OT]

Third place match: France 7-5 Spain

Final: (Europe) Europa Sel. 6-5 Portugal

- BSWW tour Feb 8-10 in Eger (Hungary)

Switzerland 3-1 Poland
Germany 9-8 Hungary
Switzerland 6-3 Germany
Poland 6-4 Hungary
Germany 4-2 Poland
Switzerland 10-6 Hungary

winner: Switzerland

- BSWW tour April 20 in Puerto Vallarta (Mexico)

Mexico 5-2 World Selection

- 4 Nations Soccer Cup May 31-June 1 in Winterthur (Wachter-Areal), Switzerland

Portugal 10-1 Netherlands
Switzerland 9-2 Germany

Third place match: Netherlands 5-2 Germany

Final: Portugal 5-1 Switzerland

- Challenge Cup June 25–27 in Netanya, Israel

Turkey 7-6 Hungary
(Czech Republic) Czech Rep. 5-1 Norway
Israel 6-4 Germany [not for the Cup]

1/2 finals
Germany 4-1 Czech Rep. (Czech Republic)
Israel 11-4 Turkey

Fifth place match
Hungary 8-6 Norway

Third place match
Turkey 9-7 Czech Rep. (Czech Republic)

Final
Israel 4-3 Germany

- 4 Nations Soccer Cup July 12–13 in Linz, Austria

Germany 4-3 Austria
Switzerland 6-4 Czech Rep. (Czech Republic)

Third place match: Austria 5-3 Czech Rep. (Czech Republic)

Final: Switzerland 6-1 Germany

- BSWW tour July 11 in Netanya, Israel

Israel 3-11 Brazil

- BSWW tour Aug 15 in Zürich, Switzerland

Switzerland 7-8 Brazil

- BSWW tour Sep 18 in Baku, Azerbaijan

Spain 6-2 Azerbaijan

- Danubia Cup Nov 11 in Bratislava, Slovakia

Switzerland 4-2 Hungary
Austria 4-3 Slovakia

Third place match: Slovakia 8-6 Hungary

Final: Switzerland 9-3 Austria

== 2010 ==
2010 Beach Soccer Worldwide Tour

Crocs Challenge Cup 2010

== 2012 ==
2012 Montenegro Trophy

== 2013 ==
2013 Montenegro Trophy

== 2017 ==
2017 Montenegro Trophy

2017 Manila Cup

== 2019 ==
BSWW Tour Events in 2019

- Talent Beach Soccer Cup Hungary 2019
- Morocco Beach Soccer Cup 2019
- NASSC - US Open 2019
- InterCup St. Petersburg 2019
- Mundialito Nazaré 2019
- Neom Beach Soccer Cup 2019
- CFA Belt and Road International Beach Soccer Championship Haikou 2019

== See also ==
- Beach soccer
