= Vilard Normcharoen =

Thai footballer

Personal information
- Full name: Phan Cha Akat Tri Vilard Normcharoen
- Date of birth: 14 July 1962
- Place of birth: Chachoengsao, Thailand
- Date of death: 7 January 2014 (aged 51)
- Place of death: Siriraj Hospital, Bangkok, Thailand
- Height: 1.75 m (5 ft 9 in)
- Position: Goalkeeper

Senior career*
Years	Team	Apps	(Gls)
1981–1987	Royal Thai Air Force FC		
1988–2002	Thai Port FC		

International career
1988	Thailand		
1999–2002	Thailand futsal		
2002	Thailand beach soccer		
- * Club domestic league appearances and goals

Vilard Normcharoen (Thai: วิลาศ น้อมเจริญ; 14 July 1962 – 7 January 2014) was a Thai Port FC player and one of Thailand's professional beach soccer players who won the award of best goalkeeper in the Beach Soccer World Cup 2002. Vilard made the transition from Futsal to beach soccer and was a great success for the national team and Normcharoen is the most experienced player in the Thailand national beach soccer team.

== Honours ==
=== Individual ===
- 2002 Beach Soccer World Championship - "Best goalkeeper"

== See also ==
- Thailand national futsal team
- Thailand national beach soccer team
- Thai Port FC
