= 2010 Beach Soccer Worldwide Tour =

Tournament details
- Teams: 4
- Venue(s): 2 (in 2 host cities)

The Beach Soccer Worldwide tour is a series of competitions in beach soccer. The competitions allow national teams to compete in beach soccer in a round-robin format over the summer months.

== BSWW Tour Casablanca - Casablanca, Morocco – July 23–25 ==
=== Participating nations ===
- Morocco
- Oman
- Switzerland
- United Arab Emirates

=== Final standings ===
Team	Pld	W	W+	L	GF	GA	+/-	Pts
Oman	3	2	0	1	14	12	+2	6
Switzerland	3	0	2	1	9	13	−4	4
Morocco	3	1	0	2	18	15	+3	3
United Arab Emirates	3	1	0	2	9	10	-1	3

clinched tournament championship

=== Schedule and results ===
23 July 2010
17:00

United Arab Emirates	2 – 2 (a.e.t.) (0 – 1 p.)	Switzerland

23 July 2010
18:15

Morocco	6 – 7	Oman

24 July 2010
17:00

Switzerland	2 – 6	Oman

24 July 2010
18:15

Morocco	7 – 3	United Arab Emirates

25 July 2010
17:00

Oman	1 – 4	United Arab Emirates

25 July 2010
18:15

Switzerland	5 – 5 (a.e.t.) (2 – 1 p.)	Morocco

== BSWW Tour Sunderland - Sunderland, England – July 30–August 1 ==
=== Participating nations ===
- England
- Germany
- Greece
- Mexico

=== Current standings ===
Team	Pld	W	W+	L	GF	GA	+/-	Pts
Mexico	3	2	1	0	11	8	+3	8
England	3	2	0	1	13	9	+4	6
Greece	3	1	0	2	8	9	-1	3
Germany	3	0	0	3	9	14	-5	0

clinched tournament championship

=== Schedule and results ===
30 July 2010
19:00

Mexico	4 - 3	Germany

30 July 2010
20:00

England	4 - 2	Greece

31 July 2010
16:00

Mexico	3 - 2	Greece

31 July 2010
17:00

England	6 - 4	Germany

1 August 2010
16:00

Germany	2 - 4	Greece

1 August 2010
17:00

England	3 - 3 (a.e.t.) (0 – 1 p.)	Mexico

== See also ==
- Beach soccer
- Euro Beach Soccer League
