= 2026 ASEAN Women's Futsal Championship =

International futsal competition

Tournament details
- Host country: Thailand
- City: Nakhon Ratchasima
- Dates: 24 February – 2 March
- Teams: 7 (from 1 sub-confederation)

Final positions
- Champions: Thailand (1st title)
- Runners-up: Australia
- Third place: Vietnam
- Fourth place: Indonesia

Tournament statistics
- Matches played: 13
- Goals scored: 65 (5 per match)
- Top scorer(s): (Thailand) Jenjira Bubpha (Thailand) Darika Peanpailun (5 goals each)
- Best player: (Thailand) Darika Peanpailun
- Best goalkeeper: (Australia) Sarah Easthope

The 2026 ASEAN Women's Futsal Championship (Thai: ฟุตซอลหญิงชิงแชมป์อาเซียน 2026) is the second edition of the ASEAN Women's Futsal Championship. The tournament is hosted in Nakhon Ratchasima, Thailand from 24 February to 2 March, 2026.

Vietnam are the defending champions, but officially became the former champions after being defeated by their rivals, Thailand in the semifinals, who then went on to defeat Australia in the final to win the tournament for the first time.

== Draw ==
The draw for the tournament was held on 19 January 2026. For the seeding the five participating teams from the 2024 ASEAN Women's Futsal Championship were determined from their performance in that tournament. Debutants Australia and Malaysia were seeded as per their FIFA women's futsal rankings as of 12 December 2025. The draw was conducted in reverse sequence. Australia as the sole team in Pot 4 are drawn in position B4 and host Thailand as host is automatically drawn in position A1.

Pot 1	Pot 2	Pot 3	Pot 4
Vietnam (1) (C); Thailand (2) (H)	Indonesia (3); Myanmar (4)	Philippines (5); Malaysia (R-27)	Australia (R-66)

== Venue ==
Nakhon Ratchasima
Terminal Hall, Terminal 21 Korat
Capacity: 3,500
2026 ASEAN Women's Futsal Championship (Thailand)

== Group stage ==
All times are local, ICT (UTC+7)

=== Tiebreakers ===
The rankings of teams in each group were determined as follows:

1. Points obtained in all group matches;
2. Points obtained in the matches played between the teams in question;
3. Goal difference in the matches played between the teams in question;
4. Number of goals scored in the matches played between the teams in question;

If two or more teams were equal on the basis of the above four criteria, their rankings were determined as follows:

5. Goal difference in all group matches;
6. Number of goals scored in all group matches;
7. Fair play points in all group matches (only one deduction could be applied to a person in a single match):
  - Yellow card: −1 points;
  - Indirect red card (second yellow card): −3 points;
  - Direct red card: −4 points;
  - Yellow card and direct red card: −5 points;
8. Drawing of lots.

=== Group A ===
Pos	Team	Pld	W	D	L	GF	GA	GD	Pts	Qualification
1	Thailand (H)	2	2	0	0	11	0	+11	6	Knockout stage
2	Indonesia	2	0	1	1	4	7	−3	1	Knockout stage
3	Malaysia	2	0	1	1	4	12	−8	1	

Source: AFF
(H) Hosts
24 February 2026
18:30

Thailand	3–0	Indonesia
Kingthong 12'; Jenjira 19'; Darika 23'	Report

Terminal 21 Korat, Nakhon Ratchasima
Referee: Reem Al-Bishi (Saudi Arabia)

25 February 2026
18:30

Indonesia	4–4	Malaysia
Nisma Rusdiana 3', 6'; Fitry Amelya 25'; Syafiqah Zainal 33' (o.g.)	Report	Syafiqah Zainal 8', 38'; Ayuna Anjani 10'; Lyana Soberi 14'

Terminal 21 Korat, Nakhon Ratchasima
Referee: Moe Win (Myanmar)

26 February 2026
18:30

Malaysia	0–8	Thailand
	Report	Darika 3'; Suchanat 5', 28'; Arriya 11'; Sangrawee 32'; Jenjira 33'; Paerploy 37', 40'

Terminal 21 Korat, Nakhon Ratchasima
Referee: Moe Win (Myanmar)

=== Group B ===
Pos	Team	Pld	W	D	L	GF	GA	GD	Pts	Qualification
1	Australia	3	2	1	0	9	2	+7	7	Knockout stage
2	Vietnam	3	2	0	1	7	4	+3	6	Knockout stage
3	Philippines	3	1	1	1	2	3	−1	4	
4	Myanmar	3	0	0	3	3	12	−9	0	

Source: AFF
24 February 2026
13:30

Vietnam	0–2	Australia
	Report	Fruscalzo 23'; Fazzari 39'

Terminal 21 Korat, Nakhon Ratchasima
Referee: Tita Rosita (Indonesia)
24 February 2026
16:00

Myanmar	0–1	Philippines
	Report	Tolentin 14'

Terminal 21 Korat, Nakhon Ratchasima
Referee: Panadda Khotsenaphattra (Thailand)

25 February 2026
13:30

Philippines	0–2	Vietnam
	Report	Lê Thị Thanh Ngân 5'; Biện Thị Hằng 37'

Terminal 21 Korat, Nakhon Ratchasima
Referee: Misaki Kawamorita (Japan)
25 February 2026
16:00

Australia	6–1	Myanmar
Holder 14', 19'; Karrys-Stahl 14', 24'; Fazzari 25'; Camilleri 33'	Report	Ya Min Thant Zin 13'

Terminal 21 Korat, Nakhon Ratchasima
Referee: Khampasong Xayavongsy (Laos)

26 February 2026
13:30

Vietnam	5–2	Myanmar
Trần Nguyệt Vi 17', 21'; Biện Thị Hằng 22', 26', 40'	Report	Ya Min Thant Zin 8'; Lwin Lwin Htet 17'

Terminal 21 Korat, Nakhon Ratchasima
Referee: Mohd Norafendy Norhayalan (Malaysia)
26 February 2026
16:00

Philippines	1–1	Australia
Borres 40'	Report	Holder 40'

Terminal 21 Korat, Nakhon Ratchasima
Referee: Khampasong Xayavongsy (Laos)

== Knockout stage ==
In the knockout stage, extra time and penalty shoot-out are used to decide the winner if necessary.

=== Bracket ===
Semi-finals
28 February – Terminal 21 Korat
Australia	3
Indonesia	2
28 February – Terminal 21 Korat
Thailand	4
Vietnam	2

Final
2 March – Terminal 21 Korat
Australia	4
Thailand	5
Third place play-off
2 March – Terminal 21 Korat
Indonesia	1
Vietnam	4

=== Semi-finals ===
28 February 2026
15:00

Australia	3–2 (a.e.t.)	Indonesia
Holder 10'; Fitry Amelya 31' (o.g.); Camilleri 50'	Report	Insyafadya Salsabillah 9'; Dhea Febrina Bangun 29'

Terminal 21 Korat, Nakhon Ratchasima
Referee: Khampasong Xayavongsy (Laos)

28 February 2026
18:30

Thailand	4–2	Vietnam
Nattamon 4'; Jenjira 11', 33'; Arriya 34'	Report	Trần Thị Thu Xuân 2'; Lê Thị Thanh Ngân 36'

Terminal 21 Korat, Nakhon Ratchasima
Referee: Mohd Norafendy Norhayalan (Malaysia)

=== Third place play-off ===
2 March 2026
15:00

Indonesia	1–4	Vietnam
Nisma Rusdiana 21'	Report	Lê Thị Thanh Ngân 24'; Trần Thị Thùy Trang 26'; Fitry Amelya 27' (o.g.); Nguyễn Phương Anh 38'

Terminal 21 Korat, Nakhon Ratchasima
Referee: Panadda Khotsenaphattra (Thailand)

=== Final ===
2 March 2026
18:30

Australia	4–5	Thailand
Sangrawee 17' (o.g.); Sasiprapha 23' (o.g.); Karrys-Stahl 24'; Fazzari 40'	Report	Sangrawee 5'; Jenjira 19'; Darika 31', 35', 36'

Terminal 21 Korat, Nakhon Ratchasima
Referee: Reem Al-Bishi (Saudi Arabia)

== Winners ==
ASEAN Women's Futsal Championship

Thailand
1st title

== Statistics ==
=== Goalscorers ===
There were 65 goals scored in 13 matches, for an average of 5 goals per match.

5 goals

- (Thailand) Darika Peanpailun
- (Thailand) Jenjira Bubpha

4 goals

- (Australia) Clare Holder
- (Vietnam) Biện Thị Hằng

3 goals

- (Australia) Alexia Karrys-Stahl
- (Australia) Nikita Fazzari
- (Indonesia) Nisma Rusdiana
- (Vietnam) Lê Thị Thanh Ngân

2 goals

- (Australia) Trudy Camilleri
- (Malaysia) Syafiqah Zainal
- (Myanmar) Ya Min Thant Zin
- (Vietnam) Trần Nguyệt Vi
- (Thailand) Arriya Saetoen
- (Thailand) Paerploy Huajaipetch
- (Thailand) Sangrawee Meekham
- (Thailand) Suchanat Nakmai

1 goal

- (Australia) Claudia Fruscalzo
- (Indonesia) Dhea Febrina Bangun
- (Indonesia) Fitry Amelya
- (Indonesia) Insyafadya Salsabillah
- (Malaysia) Ayuna Anjani
- (Malaysia) Lyana Soberi
- (Myanmar) Lwin Lwin Htet
- (Philippines) Dionesa Tolentin
- (Philippines) Sheen Borres
- (Vietnam) Nguyễn Phương Anh
- (Vietnam) Trần Thị Thu Xuân
- (Vietnam) Trần Thị Thùy Trang
- (Thailand) Panwasa Kingthong
- (Thailand) Nattamon Artkla

1 own goal

- (Malaysia) Syafiqah Zainal (against Indonesia)
- (Thailand) Sangrawee Meekham (against Australia)
- (Thailand) Sasiprapha Suksen (against Australia)

2 own goals

- (Indonesia) Fitry Amelya (against Australia and Vietnam)
