= 2018 AFF Beach Soccer Championship =

Piala AFF Sepak Bola Pantai 2018

Tournament details
- Host country: Indonesia
- City: Tanjung Benoa
- Dates: 18–24 November
- Teams: 5 (from 1 confederation)
- Venue: 1 (in 1 host city)

Final positions
- Champions: Vietnam (1st title)
- Runners-up: Thailand
- Third place: Malaysia
- Fourth place: Indonesia

Tournament statistics
- Matches played: 12
- Goals scored: 80 (6.67 per match)

The 2018 AFF Beach Soccer Championship is the second edition of the AFF Beach Soccer Championship, the premier regional beach soccer championship exclusively contested by Southeast Asian men's national teams who are members of the ASEAN Football Federation (AFF).

Organised by the AFF, the tournament takes place between 18–24 November in Tanjung Benoa, Bali, Indonesia, featuring five teams.

Malaysia are the defending champions.

== Teams ==
- Indonesia (hosts)
- Malaysia
- Timor-Leste
- Thailand
- Vietnam

== Group stage ==
Pos	Team	Pld	W	D	L	GF	GA	GD	Pts	Qualification
1	Thailand	4	4	0	0	21	10	+11	12	Final
2	Vietnam	4	3	0	1	14	14	0	9	Final
3	Indonesia (H)	4	1	1	2	13	12	+1	4	Third place match
4	Malaysia	4	1	1	2	13	15	−2	4	Third place match
5	Timor-Leste	4	0	0	4	6	13	−7	0	

(H) Hosts
18 November 2018
15:30

Thailand	4–1	Timor-Leste
	Report

18 November 2018
16:45

Vietnam	3–2	Malaysia
	Report

19 November 2018
15:30

Timor-Leste	3–4	Malaysia
	Report

19 November 2018
16:45

Vietnam	3–2	Indonesia
	Report

20 November 2018
15:30

Malaysia	3–5	Thailand
	Report

20 November 2018
16:45

Timor-Leste	2–5	Indonesia
	Report

21 November 2018
15:30

Indonesia	4–4	Malaysia
	Report

21 November 2018
16:45

Vietnam	4–9	Thailand
	Report

22 November 2018
15:30

Thailand	3–2	Indonesia

22 November 2018
16:45

Timor-Leste	1–4	Vietnam

== Placement stage ==
=== Third place match ===
24 November 2018
15:30

Indonesia	1–2	Malaysia

=== Final ===
24 November 2018
16:45

Thailand	4–6	Vietnam
