= ASEAN Football Federation =

Southeast Asian football organisation

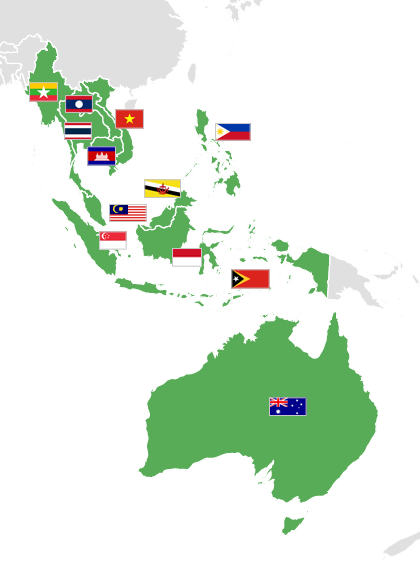
- Map of members
- Abbreviation: AFF
- Formation: 31 January 1984; 42 years ago
- Founded at: Jakarta, Indonesia
- Type: Football organisation
- Headquarters: Kuala Lumpur, Malaysia
- Region served: Southeast Asia and Australia
- Members: 12 associations
- Official language: English
- President: (Cambodia) Khiev Sameth
- Parent organization: AFC
- Website: aseanfootball.org

The ASEAN Football Federation (AFF) is an organisation within the Asian Football Confederation (AFC) and is an international governing body of association football, futsal, and beach soccer in Southeast Asia and Australia. It consists of the federations of Australia, Brunei, Cambodia, East Timor, Indonesia, Laos, Malaysia, Myanmar, Philippines, Singapore, Thailand, and Vietnam.

The AFF was founded by the member states of, and is officially associated with, the Association of Southeast Asian Nations (ASEAN), even though it also includes Australia, a non-ASEAN member state, after it left the Oceania Football Confederation in 2006, as well as Timor-Leste, who did not become a full ASEAN member until late 2025.

== History ==
The AFF was established in Jakarta on 31 January 1984 during an informal meeting of representatives of six ASEAN member states; Brunei, Indonesia, Malaysia, Singapore, Philippines and Thailand. The idea of founding the federation came from the initial meeting of founding the sub-continental football association in Bangkok in 1982 that was attended by Hamzah Abu Samah, Peter Velappan, Hans Pandelaki, Fernando G. Alvarez, Pisit Ngampanich, Teo Chong Tee and Yap Boon Chuan. Other nations that have joined the federation since are Cambodia, Laos, Myanmar and Vietnam (all in 1996), East Timor in 2004, and Australia in 2013.

== President ==
| Year | Name |
|---|---|
| 1984–1994 | (Indonesia) Haji Kardono |
| 1994–1996 | (Thailand) Vijit Ketkaew |
| 1996–2007 | (Malaysia) Tengku Ahmad Rithauddeen |
| 2007–2019 | (Malaysia) Sultan Ahmad Shah |
| 2019– | (Cambodia) Khiev Sameth |

== Members ==
ASEAN has 12 member associations, all of whom are members of the Asian Football Confederation.

| Code | Association | Joined in | National team | National league |
|---|---|---|---|---|
| AUS | Australia | 2013 | Men's; U23; U20; U17; U15; F; BS; Women's; W U23; W U20; W U17; F | (Men, Women) |
| BRU | Brunei Darussalam* | 1984 | Men's; U23; U20; U17; F; BS; Women's; U20; U17 | (Men) |
| CAM | Cambodia | 1996 | Men's; U23; U20; U17; F; BS; Women's; U20; U17 | (Men, Women) |
| TLS | (Timor-Leste) East Timor | 2004 | Men's; U23; U20; U17; F; BS; Women's; U20; U17 | (Men, Women) |
| IDN | Indonesia* | 1984 | Men's; U23; U20; U17; F; BS; Women's; U20; U17 | (Men, Women) |
| LAO | Laos | 1996 | Men's; U23; U20; U17; F; BS; Women's; U20; U17 | (Men, Women) |
| MAS | Malaysia* | 1984 | Men's; U23; U20; U17; F; BS; Women's; U20; U17 | (Men, Women) |
| MYA | Myanmar | 1996 | Men's; U23; U20; U17; F; BS; Women's; U20; U17 | (Men, Women) |
| PHI | Philippines* | 1984 | Men's; U23; U20; U17; F; BS; Women's; U20; U17 | (Men, Women) |
| SGP | Singapore* | 1984 | Men's; U23; U20; U17; F; BS; Women's; U20; U17 | (Men, Women) |
| THA | Thailand* | 1984 | Men's; U23; U20; U17; F; BS; Women's; U20; U17 | (Men, Women) |
| VIE | Vietnam | 1996 | Men's; U23; U20; U17; F; BS; Women's; U20; U17 | (Men, Women) |

Notes

(*) Founding member

== Tournaments ==
=== National competitions ===
Men's

- FIFA ASEAN Cup
- ASEAN Championship
- SEA Games Men's Football Tournament
- ASEAN U-23 Championship
- ASEAN U-19 Boys' Championship
- ASEAN U-17 Boys' Championship
- Hassanal Bolkiah Trophy
- ASEAN Futsal Championship
- Sea Games Men's Futsal Tournament
- ASEAN U-19 Futsal Championship
- ASEAN U-16 Futsal Championship
- ASEAN Beach Soccer Championship

Women's

- ASEAN Women's Championship
- SEA Games Women's Football Tournament
- ASEAN Women's Cup
- ASEAN U-19 Women's Championship
- ASEAN U-16 Women's Championship
- ASEAN Women's Futsal Championship
- Sea Games Women's Futsal Tournament
- ASEAN U-19 Women's Futsal Championship
- ASEAN U-16 Women's Futsal Championship

=== Club competitions ===
Men's

- ASEAN Club Championship
- ASEAN Futsal Club Championship

Women's

- ASEAN Women's Futsal Club Championship

Defunct

- ASEAN Champions' Cup
- Mekong Club Championship

== Title holders ==
| Competition | Year | Champions | Title | Runners-up | Next edition |
Men's national teams
| FIFA ASEAN Cup | 2026 (Final) | Indonesia | 1st | Thailand | 2030 (Final) |
| ASEAN Championship | 2026 (Final) | Vietnam | 4th | Thailand | 2028 (Final) |
| ASEAN U-23 Championship | 2025 | Vietnam | 3rd | Indonesia | 2027 |
| ASEAN U-19 Boys Championship | 2026 | Australia | 6th | Thailand | 2028 |
| ASEAN U-17 Boys' Championship | 2026 | Vietnam | 4th | Malaysia | 2028 |
| SEA Games Men's Football Tournament | 2025 (Final) | Vietnam | 4th | Thailand | 2027 (Final) |
| Hassanal Bolkiah Trophy | 2018 | Timor-Leste | 1st | Cambodia | TBD |
| ASEAN Futsal Championship | 2026 | Thailand | 17th | Indonesia | 2028 |
| ASEAN U-19 Boys' Futsal Championship | 2025 | Thailand | 1st | Indonesia | 2027 |
| ASEAN U-16 Boys' Futsal Championship | 2025 | Indonesia | 1st | Thailand | 2027 |
| SEA Games Men's Futsal Tournament | 2025 | Indonesia | 1st | Thailand | 2027 |
| ASEAN Beach Soccer Championship | 2022 | Thailand | 2nd | Malaysia | 2026 |
Women's national teams
| ASEAN Women's Championship | 2025 (Final) | Australia U23 | 1st | Myanmar | 2027 |
| AFF Women's Cup | 2026 | Indonesia | 2nd | Laos | 2028 |
| U-19 Women's Championship | 2025 | Thailand | 3rd | Vietnam | 2027 |
| U-16 Women's Championship | 2025 | Australia | 2nd | Thailand | 2027 |
| SEA Games Women's Football Tournament | 2025 (Final) | Philippines | 1st | Vietnam | 2027 (Final) |
| ASEAN Women's Futsal Championship | 2026 | Thailand | 1st | Australia | 2028 |
| ASEAN U-19 Girls' Futsal Championship | | | | | 2026 10-13 December |
| ASEAN U-16 Girls' Futsal Championship | | | | | 2026 10-13 December |
| SEA Games Women's Futsal Tournament | 2025 | Vietnam | 1st | Indonesia | 2027 |
Men's club teams
| ASEAN Club Championship | 2025–26 (Final) | (Thailand) Buriram United | 2nd | (Malaysia) Selangor FC | 2026–27 |
| Futsal Club Championship | 2023 (Final) | (Indonesia) Black Steel Papua | 1st | (Thailand) Hongyen Thakam | 2026 |
Women's club teams
| Women's Futsal Club Championship | 2016 (Final) | (Indonesia) Jaya Kencana Angels | 1st | (Thailand) Khon Kaen | TBD |

=== Titles by nation ===
As of 22 July 2026

| Nation | National team | | | | | | | | | | | | National team (women) | | | | | | | | | Club | | | Total |
| Nation | FIFA | Ch | SEA | U23 | U19 | U16 | HBT | Futs | SeaF | F19 | F16 | BS | Ch | Cu | SEA | U19 | U16 | Futs | SeaF | F19 | F16 | ACC | FutsM | FutsW | Total |
|---|---|---|---|---|---|---|---|---|---|---|---|---|---|---|---|---|---|---|---|---|---|---|---|---|---|
| Thailand | | 7 | 16 | 1 | 5 | 3 | 2 | 17 | 5 | 1 | | 2 | 4 | | 5 | 3 | 3 | 1 | 5 | | | 2 | 6 | | 88 |
| Vietnam | | 4 | 4 | 3 | 1 | 4 | | | | | | 1 | 3 | | 8 | | | 1 | 1 | | | | | 2 | 32 |
| Indonesia | 1 | | 3 | 1 | 2 | 2 | 1 | 2 | 1 | | 1 | | | 2 | | | | | | | | | 3 | 1 | 20 |
| Australia | | | | | 6 | 3 | | | | | | | 1 | | | 1 | 2 | | | | | | | | 13 |
| Malaysia | | 1 | 6 | | 2 | 2 | | | | | | 1 | | | | | | | | | | | | | 12 |
| Myanmar | | | 5 | | 2 | 2 | 1 | | | | | | 2 | | | | | | | | | | | | 12 |
| Singapore | | 4 | | | | | | | | | | | | | | | | | | | | 1 | | | 5 |
| Japan* | | | | | 1 | 1 | | | | | | | 1 | | | | | | | | | | | | 3 |
| Philippines | | | | | | | | | | | | | 1 | | 1 | | | | | | | | | | 2 |
| Brunei | | | | | | | 1 | | | | | | | | | | | | | | | | | | 1 |
| Timor-Leste | | | | | | | 1 | | | | | | | | | | | | | | | | | | 1 |
| India* | | | | | | | | | | | | | | | | | | | | | | 1 | | | 1 |
| Iran* | | | | | 1 | | | | | | | | | | | | | | | | | | | | 1 |
| Cambodia | | | | | | | | | | | | | | | | | | | | | | | | | 0 |
| Laos | | | | | | | | | | | | | | | | | | | | | | | | | 0 |
| Total | 1 | 16 | 34 | 5 | 19 | 17 | 6 | 19 | 6 | 1 | 1 | 4 | 12 | 2 | 14 | 4 | 5 | 2 | 6 | | | 3 | 9 | 3 | |

Notes

(*) Champion as an invited team.

== Tournament record ==
=== FIFA World Cup ===
FIFA World Cup record
| Team | 1930 (Uruguay) (13) | 1934 (Kingdom of Italy) (16) | 1938 (French Third Republic) (15) | 1950 (Fourth Brazilian Republic) (13) | 1954 (Switzerland) (16) | 1958 (Sweden) (16) | 1962 (Chile) (16) | 1966 (England) (16) | 1970 (Mexico) (16) | 1974 (West Germany) (16) | 1978 (Argentina) (16) | 1982 (Spain) (24) | 1986 (Mexico) (24) | 1990 (Italy) (24) | 1994 (United States) (24) | 1998 (France) (32) | 2002 (Japan) (South Korea) (32) | 2006 (Germany) (32) | 2010 (South Africa) (32) | 2014 (Brazil) (32) | 2018 (Russia) (32) | 2022 (Qatar) (32) | 2026 (Canada) (Mexico) (United States) (48) | 2030 (Morocco) (Spain) (Portugal) (Argentina) (Uruguay) (Paraguay) (48) | 2034 (Saudi Arabia) (48) | Years |
|---|---|---|---|---|---|---|---|---|---|---|---|---|---|---|---|---|---|---|---|---|---|---|---|---|---|---|
| Australia (Note: Competed as part of the OFC in 1974 and 2006.) | × | × | × | × | × | × | × | × | × | GS | × | × | × | × | × | × | × | R16 | GS (Note: Provisional Member of AFF. Became an official member in 2013.) | GS | GS | R16 | R32 | | | 7 |
| Indonesia (Note: Indonesia competed as the Dutch East Indies in 1938.) | × | × | R1 | × | × | • | × | × | × | • | • | • | • | • | • | • | • | • | • | • | × | • | • | | | 1 |

==== World Cup qualifier final round ====
| Team | 2002 (Japan) (South Korea) | 2018 (Russia) | 2022 (Qatar) | 2026 (Canada) (Mexico) (United States) | Years |
|---|---|---|---|---|---|
| Thailand | 5th/5 | 6th/6 | • | • | 2 |
| Indonesia | • | × | • | 4th/6 | 1 |
| Vietnam | • | • | 6th/6 | • | 1 |

=== FIFA Women's World Cup ===
FIFA Women's World Cup record
| Team | 1991 (China) (12) | 1995 (Sweden) (12) | 1999 (United States) (16) | 2003 (United States) (16) | 2007 (China) (16) | 2011 (Germany) (16) | 2015 (Canada) (24) | 2019 (France) (24) | 2023 (Australia) (New Zealand) (32) | 2027 (Brazil) (32) | Years |
|---|---|---|---|---|---|---|---|---|---|---|---|
| Australia (Note: Competed as part of the OFC between 1991 and 2006.) | × | GS | GS | GS | QF | QF | QF | R16 | 4th | Q | 9 |
| Thailand | • | × | × | • | • | • | GS | GS | • | • | 2 |
| Philippines | × | • | • | • | • | × | • | • | GS | Q | 2 |
| Vietnam | × | × | × | • | • | • | • | • | GS | • | 1 |

=== Olympic Games men's football tournament ===
Olympic Games (Men's tournament) record
| Team | 1900 (France) (3) | 1904 (United States) (3) | | 1908 (United Kingdom) (6) | 1912 (Sweden) (11) | 1920 (Belgium) (14) | 1924 (France) (22) | 1928 (Netherlands) (17) | 1936 (Germany) (16) | 1948 (United Kingdom) (18) | 1952 (Finland) (25) | 1956 (Australia) (11) | 1960 (Italy) (16) | 1964 (Japan) (14) | 1968 (Mexico) (16) | 1972 (West Germany) (16) | 1976 (Canada) (13) | 1980 (Soviet Union) (16) | 1984 (United States) (16) | 1988 (South Korea) (16) | 1992 (Spain) (16) | 1996 (United States) (16) | 2000 (Australia) (16) | 2004 (Greece) (16) | 2008 (China) (16) | 2012 (United Kingdom) (16) | 2016 (Brazil) (16) | 2021 (Japan) (16) | 2024 (France) (16) | Years |
|---|---|---|---|---|---|---|---|---|---|---|---|---|---|---|---|---|---|---|---|---|---|---|---|---|---|---|---|---|---|---|
| Thailand | × | × | × | × | × | × | × | × | × | × | × | GS | • | • | GS | • | × | × | • | • | • | • | • | • | • | • | • | • | • | 2 |
| Malaysia | × | × | × | × | × | × | × | × | × | × | × | × | × | • | • | GS | • | × | • | • | • | • | • | • | • | • | • | • | • | 1 |
| Myanmar | × | × | × | × | × | × | × | × | × | × | × | • | • | • | • | GS | • | • | • | • | × | × | • | • | • | • | • | • | • | 1 |
| Indonesia | × | × | × | × | × | × | × | × | × | × | × | QF | • | × | • | • | • | • | • | • | • | • | • | • | • | • | • | • | • | 1 |

=== AFC Asian Cup ===
AFC Asian Cup record
| Team | 1956 (Hong Kong) (4) | 1960 (South Korea) (4) | 1964 (Israel) (4) | 1968 (Iran) (5) | 1972 (Thailand) (6) | 1976 (Iran) (6) | 1980 (Kuwait) (10) | 1984 (Singapore) (10) | 1988 (Qatar) (10) | 1992 (Japan) (8) | 1996 (United Arab Emirates) (12) | 2000 (Lebanon) (12) | 2004 (China) (16) | 2007 (Indonesia) (Malaysia) (Thailand) (Vietnam) (16) | 2011 (Qatar) (16) | 2015 (Australia) (16) | 2019 (United Arab Emirates) (24) | 2023 (Qatar) (24) | 2027 (Saudi Arabia) (24) | 2031 (24) | Years |
|---|---|---|---|---|---|---|---|---|---|---|---|---|---|---|---|---|---|---|---|---|---|
| Thailand | × | × | • | • | 3rd | • | • | • | • | GS | GS | GS | GS | GS | • | • | R16 | R16 | Q | | 9 |
| Indonesia | × | × | × | • | • | • | • | • | • | • | GS | GS | GS | GS | • | • | × | R16 | Q | | 6 |
| Vietnam | 4th | 4th | • | • | × | • | × | × | × | × | • | • | • | QF | • | • | QF | GS | Q | | 6 |
| Malaysia | • | • | • | • | • | GS | GS | • | • | • | • | • | • | GS | • | • | • | GS | • | | 4 |
| Singapore | × | • | × | • | × | • | • | GS | × | • | • | • | • | • | • | • | • | • | Q | | 2 |
| Cambodia | • | × | × | • | 4th | × | × | × | × | × | × | • | × | × | • | • | • | • | • | | 1 |
| Myanmar | × | × | × | 2nd | × | × | × | × | × | × | • | • | • | × | × | × | • | • | • | | 1 |
| Philippines | • | • | × | • | × | × | • | • | × | × | • | • | × | × | • | • | GS | • | • | | 1 |

=== AFC U-23 Asian Cup ===
| Teams | 2013 | 2016 | 2018 | 2020 | 2022 | 2024 | 2026 | Years |
|---|---|---|---|---|---|---|---|---|
| Vietnam | • | GS | 2nd | GS | QF | QF | 3rd | 6 |
| Thailand | • | GS | GS | QF | GS | GS | GS | 6 |
| Malaysia | • | • | QF | • | GS | GS | | 3 |
| Indonesia | • | • | • | • | • | 4th | | 1 |
| Myanmar | GS | • | • | • | • | • | | 1 |

=== Asian Games men's football tournament ===
Football at the Asian Games was a senior tournament until 1998.
Football at the Asian Games has been an under-23 tournament since 2002.

| Nation | (India) 1951 (6) | (Philippines) 1954 (12) | (Japan) 1958 (14) | (Indonesia) 1962 (8) | (Thailand) 1966 (11) | (Thailand) 1970 (10) | (Iran) 1974 (15) | (Thailand) 1978 (14) | (India) 1982 (16) | (South Korea) 1986 (18) | (China) 1990 (14) | (Japan) 1994 (19) | (Thailand) 1998 (23) | (South Korea) 2002 (24) | (Qatar) 2006 (28) | (China) 2010 (24) | (South Korea) 2014 (29) | (Indonesia) 2018 (25) | (China) 2022 (23) | Years |
|---|---|---|---|---|---|---|---|---|---|---|---|---|---|---|---|---|---|---|---|---|
| Thailand | | | | 7th | 6th | 6th | 12th | 6th | 10th | 11th | 4th | 15th | 4th | 4th | 7th | 7th | 4th | 18th | 14th | 15 |
| Malaysia | | | 13th | 3rd | 10th | 10th | 3rd | 7th | 14th | 15th | 12th | 12th | | 17th | 23rd | 16th | 19th | 12th | | 15 |
| Vietnam (South Vietnam) | | 7th | 7th | 4th | 7th | 9th | | | | | | | 17th | 19th | 15th | 14th | 12th | 4th | 17th | 11 |
| Indonesia | 6th | 4th | 3rd | 5th | 5th | 5th | | | | 4th | DQ | DQ | | | 27th | | 11th | 10th | 11th | 10 |
| Myanmar (Burma) | 5th | 3rd | 11th | DQ | 1st | 1st | 7th | 12th | 13th | | | 16th | DQ | | | | | 19th | 10th | 10 |
| Singapore | | 9th | 10th | | 4th | | | | | | 11th | | | | 26th | 19th | 17th | | | 7 |
| Philippines | | 11th | 8th | 8th | | | 15th | | | | | | | | | | | | | 4 |
| Laos | | | | | | | | | | | | | 21st | | | | 27th | 23rd | | 3 |
| Timor-Leste | | | | | | | | | | | | | | | | | 28th | 24th | | 2 |
| Cambodia | | | | | | 7th | | | | | | | 19th | | | | | | | 2 |
| Brunei | | | | | | | | | | | | DQ | DQ | | | | | | | 0 |

=== FIFA U-20 World Cup ===
FIFA U-20 World Cup record
| Team | 1977 (Tunisia) (16) | 1979 (Japan) (16) | 1981 (Australia) (16) | 1983 (Mexico) (16) | 1985 (Soviet Union) (16) | 1987 (Chile) (16) | 1989 (Saudi Arabia) (16) | 1991 (Portugal) (16) | 1993 (Australia) (16) | 1995 (Qatar) (16) | 1997 (Malaysia) (24) | 1999 (Nigeria) (24) | 2001 (Argentina) (24) | 2003 (United Arab Emirates) (24) | 2005 (Netherlands) (24) | 2007 (Canada) (24) | 2009 (Egypt) (24) | 2011 (Colombia) (24) | 2013 (Turkey) (24) | 2015 (New Zealand) (24) | 2017 (South Korea) (24) | 2019 (Poland) (24) | 2023 (Argentina) (24) | 2025 (Chile) (24) | Years |
|---|---|---|---|---|---|---|---|---|---|---|---|---|---|---|---|---|---|---|---|---|---|---|---|---|---|
| Indonesia | • | GS | • | • | • | • | • | • | • | • | • | • | • | • | • | • | • | • | • | • | • | • | • | • | 1 |
| Vietnam | • | • | • | • | • | • | • | • | • | • | • | • | • | • | • | • | • | • | • | • | GS | • | • | • | 1 |
| Myanmar | • | • | • | • | • | • | • | • | • | • | • | • | • | • | • | • | • | • | • | GS | • | • | • | • | 1 |
| Malaysia | • | • | • | • | • | • | • | • | • | • | GS | • | • | • | • | • | • | • | • | • | • | • | • | • | 1 |

=== FIFA U-17 World Cup ===
FIFA U-17 World Cup record
| Team | 1985 (China) (16) | 1987 (Canada) (16) | 1989 (Scotland) (16) | 1991 (Italy) (16) | 1993 (Japan) (16) | 1995 (Ecuador) (16) | 1997 (Egypt) (16) | 1999 (New Zealand) (16) | 2001 (Trinidad and Tobago) (16) | 2003 (Finland) (16) | 2005 (Peru) (16) | 2007 (South Korea) (24) | 2009 (Nigeria) (24) | 2011 (Mexico) (24) | 2013 (United Arab Emirates) (24) | 2015 (Chile) (24) | 2017 (India) (24) | 2019 (Brazil) (24) | 2023 (Indonesia) (24) | 2025 (Qatar) (48) | Years |
|---|---|---|---|---|---|---|---|---|---|---|---|---|---|---|---|---|---|---|---|---|---|
| Thailand | • | • | • | • | • | • | GS | GS | • | • | • | • | • | • | • | • | • | • | • | • | 2 |
| Indonesia | • | • | • | • | • | • | • | • | • | • | • | • | • | • | • | • | • | • | GS | GS | 2 |

=== FIFA Futsal World Cup ===
FIFA Futsal World Cup record
| Team | (Netherlands) 1989 (16) | (Hong Kong) 1992 (16) | (Spain) 1996 (16) | (Guatemala) 2000 (16) | (Chinese Taipei) 2004 (16) | (Brazil) 2008 (20) | (Thailand) 2012 (24) | (Colombia) 2016 (24) | (Lithuania) 2021 (24) | (Uzbekistan) 2024 (24) | Years |
|---|---|---|---|---|---|---|---|---|---|---|---|
| Thailand | | | | R1 | R1 | R1 | R2 | R2 | R2 | R2 | 7 |
| Vietnam | | | | | | | | R2 | R2 | | 2 |
| Malaysia | | | R1 | | | | | | | | 1 |

=== FIFA Women's Futsal World Cup ===
FIFA Women's Futsal World Cup record
| Team | (Philippines) 2025 (16) | Years |
|---|---|---|
| Philippines | GS | 1 |
| Thailand | GS | 1 |

== Rankings ==
=== National football team ===
AFF Men's National Football Team Ranking By FIFA
Update: 1 April 2026.
Next update: 9 July 2026.

| AFF | AFC | FIFA | Country | Points | +/− |
|---|---|---|---|---|---|
| 1 | 4 | 27 | Australia | 1580.67 | Steady |
| 2 | 14 | 93 | Thailand | 1252.14 | ▲3 |
| 3 | 17 | 99 | Vietnam | 1225.68 | ▲9 |
| 4 | 22 | 122 | Indonesia | 1144.88 | Steady |
| 5 | 24 | 135 | Philippines | 1094.10 | ▲1 |
| 6 | 26 | 138 | Malaysia | 1086.22 | ▼17 |
| 7 | 28 | 147 | Singapore | 1059.53 | ▲1 |
| 8 | 31 | 158 | Myanmar | 1011.88 | ▲5 |
| 9 | 36 | 177 | Cambodia | 911.54 | ▲2 |
| 10 | 38 | 185 | Laos | 885.03 | ▲5 |
| 11 | 42 | 193 | Brunei | 863.09 | ▼5 |
| 12 | 44 | 200 | Timor-Leste | 825.64 | ▼2 |

Top Ranked Men's National Football Teams

=== Women's national football team ===
AFF Women's National Football Team Ranking by FIFA
Update: 21 April 2026
Next Update: 15 June 2026

| AFF | AFC | FIFA | Country | Points | +/− |
|---|---|---|---|---|---|
| 1 | 3 | 15 | Australia | 1838.17 | Steady |
| 2 | 6 | 37 | Vietnam | 1593.71 | ▼1 |
| 3 | 7 | 39 | Philippines | 1566.44 | ▲2 |
| 4 | 9 | 50 | Thailand | 1469.68 | ▼1 |
| 5 | 11 | 55 | Myanmar | 1484.97 | Steady |
| 6 | 17 | 92 | Malaysia | 1218.02 | ▼1 |
| 7 | 19 | 106 | Indonesia | 1175.97 | ▼1 |
| 8 | 22 | 113 | Laos | 1164.92 | ▲1 |
| 9 | 23 | 117 | Cambodia | 1146.28 | Steady |
| 10 | 30 | 152 | Singapore | 1019.15 | Steady |
| 11 | 32 | 157 | Timor-Leste | 965.35 | Steady |
| * | * | * | Brunei | – | Steady |

* Inactive for more than 48 months and therefore not ranked.

Top Ranked Women's National Football Teams

=== National futsal team ===
AFF Men's National Futsal Team Ranking by FIFA
Update: 12 December 2025

| AFF | FIFA | Country | Points |
|---|---|---|---|
| 1 | 11 | Thailand | 1319.33 |
| 2 | 20 | Vietnam | 1201.03 |
| 3 | 24 | Indonesia | 1190.97 |
| 4 | 51 | Australia | 1046.91 |
| 5 | 60 | Myanmar | 1019.27 |
| 6 | 70 | Malaysia | 988.92 |
| 7 | 81 | Malaysia | 971.06 |
| 8 | 103 | Timor-Leste | 899.66 |
| 9 | 122 | Brunei | 844.46 |
| 10 | 123 | Cambodia | 840.67 |
| * | * | Laos | - |
| * | * | Philippines | - |
| * | * | Singapore | - |

Note: (*) Inactive

=== Women's national futsal team ===
AFF Women's National Futsal Team Ranking by FIFA
Update: 11 December 2025

| AFF | FIFA | Country | Points |
|---|---|---|---|
| 1 | 8 | Thailand | 1185.31 |
| 2 | 11 | Vietnam | 1133.86 |
| 3 | 18 | Indonesia | 1056.79 |
| 4 | 27 | Malaysia | 987.72 |
| 5 | 38 | Myanmar | 929.53 |
| 6 | 66 | Australia | 831.63 |
| 7 | 69 | Philippines | 811.28 |
| * | * | Laos | – |
| * | * | Brunei | – |
| * | * | Cambodia | – |
| * | * | Singapore | – |
| * | * | Timor-Leste | – |

Note: (*) Inactive

=== National beach soccer team ===
AFF Men's National Beach Soccer Team Ranking by BSWW
Update: 19 January 2026

| AFF | Country | Points |
|---|---|---|
| 1 | Thailand | 349.5 |
| 2 | Malaysia | 130.5 |
| 3 | Indonesia | 130.5 |
| 4 | Vietnam | 87 |
| * | Australia | – |
| * | Brunei | – |
| * | Cambodia | – |
| * | Laos | – |
| * | Myanmar | – |
| * | Philippines | – |
| * | Singapore | – |
| * | Timor-Leste | – |

Note: (*) Inactive

=== Women's national beach soccer team ===
AFF Women's National Beach Soccer Team Ranking by BSWW
Update: 19 January 2026

| AFF | Country | Points |
|---|---|---|
| * | Australia | – |
| * | Brunei | – |
| * | Cambodia | – |
| * | Indonesia | – |
| * | Laos | – |
| * | Malaysia | – |
| * | Myanmar | – |
| * | Philippines | – |
| * | Singapore | – |
| * | Thailand | – |
| * | Timor-Leste | – |
| * | Vietnam | – |

Note: (*) Inactive

=== National football league ===
AFF Men's National Football League Ranking by AFC

AFC Club Competitions Ranking 2025 - footyrankings

Update: 27 April 2026

| AFF | League | Points | Current champions | Most championship in the league |
|---|---|---|---|---|
| 1 | (Thailand) Thai League 1 | 58.271 | Buriram United | Buriram United (12) |
| 2 | (Australia) A-League Men | 46.678 | Melbourne City | Sydney (5) |
| 3 | Malaysia Super League | 41.434 | Johor Darul Ta'zim | Johor Darul Ta'zim (12) |
| 4 | Singapore Premier League | 38.061 | Lion City Sailors | Warriors (9) |
| 5 | (Vietnam) V.League 1 | 38.020 | Thép Xanh Nam Định | Viettel, Hà Nội (6) |
| 6 | Indonesia Super League | 26.299 | Persib | Persib (5) |
| 7 | (Cambodia) Cambodian Premier League | 22.850 | Preah Khan Reach Svay Rieng | Phnom Penh Crown (8) |
| 8 | Philippines Football League | 16.215 | Kaya–Iloilo | United City (4) |
| 9 | Myanmar National League | 12.612 | Shan United | Shan United (7) |
| 10 | (Laos) Lao League 1 | 3.387 | Ezra | Lao Army (8) |
| 11 | Brunei Super League | 0.580 | Indera | MS ABDB (4) |
| 12 | (Timor-Leste) Liga Futebol Amadora Primeira Divisão | 0.000 | Karketu Dili | Karketu Dili (4) |

== Awards ==
AFF President Sultan of Pahang, Sultan Haji Ahmad Shah said that:

"In recent years, ASEAN football has cultivated some serious talent, and the region is growing as a football powerhouse. We are gaining traction at a global level, and the time is right to honour the men and women who have dedicated their lives to the evolution and honour of the world’s most popular sport."

Sultan Haji Ahmad Shah, who is also chairman of the Awards Selection Committee, said that as football in the region continued to develop and mature, the commitment demonstrated by ASEAN’s finest needed to be acknowledged.

The AFF Awards is held every 2 years, starting from 2013.

=== ASEAN Goodwill Award ===
| Year | Recipient |
|---|---|
| 2013 | (Malaysia) Sultan Haji Ahmad Shah |
| 2015 | (Malaysia) Sultan Haji Ahmad Shah |
| 2017 | (Myanmar) Zaw Zaw |

=== AFF Life Service Award ===
| Year | Recipient |
|---|---|
| 2013 | (Malaysia) Tengku Tan Sri Dato’ Seri Ahmad Rithauddeen |
| 2015 | (Malaysia) Dato' Sri Paul Mony Samuel |
| 2017 | (Indonesia) Haji Kardono |

=== AFF Association of the Year ===
| Year | Association |
|---|---|
| 2013 | Myanmar |
| 2015 | Myanmar |
| 2017 | Vietnam |
| 2019 | Indonesia |

=== AFF National Team of the Year ===
| Year | Men | Women |
|---|---|---|
| 2013 | Singapore | Vietnam |
| 2015 | Thailand | Thailand |
| 2017 | Thailand | Thailand |
| 2019 | Vietnam | Thailand |

=== AFF Player of the Year (men's) ===
| Year | Name | Club |
|---|---|---|
| 2013 | (Singapore) Shahril Ishak | (Singapore) LionsXII |
| 2015 | (Thailand) Chanathip Songkrasin | (Thailand) BEC Tero Sasana |
| 2017 | (Thailand) Chanathip Songkrasin | (Thailand) Muangthong United |
| 2019 | (Vietnam) Nguyễn Quang Hải | (Vietnam) Hà Nội |

=== AFF Player of the Year (women's) ===
| Year | Name | Club |
|---|---|---|
| 2013 | (Vietnam) Đặng Thị Kiều Trinh | (Vietnam) Hồ Chí Minh City I |
| 2015 | (Thailand) Nisa Romyen | (Thailand) North Bangkok University |
| 2017 | (Thailand) Waraporn Boonsing | (Thailand) BG-Bandit Asia |
| 2019 | (Thailand) Pitsamai Sornsai | (Thailand) Chonburi Sports School |

=== AFF Youth Player of the Year (men's) ===
| Year | Name | Club |
|---|---|---|
| 2013 | (Laos) Keoviengphet Liththideth | (Laos) Ezra |
| 2015 | (Myanmar) Aung Thu | (Myanmar) Yadanarbon |
| 2017 | (Vietnam) Đoàn Văn Hậu | (Vietnam) Hà Nội |
| 2019 | (Thailand) Suphanat Mueanta | (Thailand) Buriram United |

=== AFF Futsal Team of the Year ===
| Year | Men |
|---|---|
| 2013 | Thailand |
| 2015 | Thailand |
| 2017 | Thailand |
| 2019 | Thailand |

=== AFF Futsal Player of the Year (men's) ===
| Year | Name | Club |
|---|---|---|
| 2013 | (Thailand) Suphawut Thueanklang | (Thailand) Chonburi Bluewave |
| 2015 | (Thailand) Jetsada Chudech | (Thailand) Rajnavy |
| 2017 | (Thailand) Jirawat Sornwichian | (Thailand) Chonburi Bluewave |
| 2019 | (Vietnam) Trần Văn Vũ | (Vietnam) Thái Sơn Nam |

=== AFF Coach of the Year ===
| Year | Men | Name | Women | Name |
| 2013 | Singapore | (Serbia) Radojko Avramović | Myanmar | (Japan) Kumada Yoshinori |
| 2015 | Thailand | (Thailand) Kiatisuk Senamuang | Thailand | (Thailand) Nuengrutai Srathongvian |
| 2017 | Thailand | (Thailand) Kiatisuk Senamuang | Vietnam | (Vietnam) Mai Đức Chung |
| 2019 | Vietnam | (South Korea) Park Hang-seo | Thailand | (Thailand) Nuengrutai Srathongvian |

=== AFF Referee of the Year ===
| Year | Men | Women |
|---|---|---|
| 2013 | (Singapore) Abdul Malik Abdul Bashir | (Singapore) Abirami Apbai Naidu |
| 2015 | (Malaysia) Mohd Amirul Izwan Yaacob | (Malaysia) Rita Ghani |
| 2017 | (Singapore) Muhammad Taqi | (Myanmar) Thein Thein Aye |
| 2019 | (Thailand) Sivakorn Pu-Udom | (Australia) Jacewicz Katherine Margaret |

=== AFF Assistant Referee of the Year ===
| Year | Men | Women |
|---|---|---|
| 2013 | (Singapore) Tang Yew Mun | (Malaysia) Widiya Habibah Shamsuri |
| 2015 | (Malaysia) Azman Ismail | (Singapore) Rohaidah Mohd Nasir |
| 2017 | (Malaysia) Mohd Yusri Muhamad | (Vietnam) Truong Thi Le Trinh |
| 2019 | (Singapore) Ronnie Koh Min Kiat | (Thailand) Hinthong Supawan |

=== Best Goal in the AFF Suzuki Cup ===
| Year | Name | Club | Match |
|---|---|---|---|
| 2012 | (Thailand) Teerasil Dangda | (Thailand) Muangthong United | Semi Final (1st Leg) Malaysia vs Thailand, 9 December 2012. |
| 2014 | (Vietnam) Lê Công Vinh | (Vietnam) Becamex Binh Duong | Group A Vietnam vs Indonesia, 22 November 2014. |
| 2016 | (Cambodia) Chrerng Polroth | (Cambodia) Phnom Penh Crown | Group B Cambodia vs Vietnam, 25 November 2016. |
| 2018 | (Malaysia) Syahmi Safari | (Malaysia) Selangor | Semi Final (2nd leg) Thailand vs Malaysia, 5 December 2018. |

=== AFF Best XI ===
| 2013 | 2017 | 2019 |

== See also ==
- FIFA
  - Asian Football Confederation (AFC)
    - East Asian Football Federation (EAFF)
    - Central Asian Football Association (CAFA)
    - South Asian Football Federation (SAFF)
    - West Asian Football Federation (WAFF)
- ASEAN All-Stars
