= 2011 AFC Beach Soccer Championship =

2011 FIFA Beach Soccer World Cup Qualification (AFC)

Tournament details
- Host country: Oman
- City: Muscat
- Dates: 27 February – 4 March
- Teams: 11 (from 1 confederation)
- Venue: 1 (in 1 host city)

Final positions
- Champions: Japan (2nd title)
- Runners-up: Oman
- Third place: Iran
- Fourth place: United Arab Emirates

Tournament statistics
- Matches played: 23
- Goals scored: 163 (7.09 per match)
- Top scorer(s): (Japan) Takeshi Kawaharazuka (Oman) Ishaq Al-Mas (8 goals)
- Best player: (Oman) Yahya Al-Araimi

The 2011 AFC Beach Soccer Championship was a continental beach soccer tournament, which took place from 27 February to 4 March 2011, in Muscat, Oman, seeing the tournament leave Dubai for the first time. Beach Soccer Worldwide and FIFA decided to move the location of the championship to the Al-Musannah Sports City complex in Muscat, due to the success of the 2010 Asian Beach Games held there.

The two finalists and the third place play-off winner earned qualification to represent Asia at the 2011 FIFA Beach Soccer World Cup in Ravenna, Italy being Japan, who won the championship for a second consecutive time, Oman who finished in second place, qualifying to the world cup for the first time and Iran who beat the United Arab Emirates in the third place play off, to qualify by finishing in third place for the fourth time.

== Participating teams ==
A tournament record 11 teams, an increase of four teams following the seven that participated in the 2009 qualifiers confirmed their participation in the competition, with many newcomers, showing the ever growing popularity of the sport.

- Bahrain
- China
- Indonesia
- Iran
- Iraq
- Japan
- Kuwait
- Oman
- Syria
- United Arab Emirates
- Uzbekistan

Originally, 15 teams were going to take part, which included Afghanistan, Palestine, Qatar and Yemen. However, the four countries pulled out of the tournament because of an undisclosed reason.

== Group stage ==
The draw to divide the eleven teams into the following three groups was conducted on 24 February 2011. The group stage commenced on 27 February 2011 and consisted of each nation playing each other once in a single round-robin format. To qualify for the quarter-finals, a team must have finished in the top two of each group or have one of the two best records of the third placed group finishers.

All kickoff times are listed as Omani local time (UTC+4).

Key to colours in group tables
| Group winners, runners-up, and best two third placed teams advance to the quarter finals |

=== Group A ===
| Team | Pld | W | W+ | L | GF | GA | GD | Pts |
|---|---|---|---|---|---|---|---|---|
| Oman | 3 | 3 | 0 | 0 | 20 | 9 | +11 | 9 |
| China | 3 | 2 | 0 | 1 | 9 | 4 | +5 | 6 |
| Iraq | 3 | 0 | 1 | 2 | 10 | 20 | −10 | 2 |
| Kuwait | 3 | 0 | 0 | 3 | 11 | 17 | −6 | 0 |

27 February 2011
13:15

| China | 5 – 2 | Iraq |
|---|---|---|
| Han Xue 6', 17'; Gui Qixuan 15', 33'; Qiu Hao 36' | Report | Sadeq Jabr 2'; Hussein Jabbar 8' |

Al-Musannah Sports City, Muscat

27 February 2011
17:00

| Kuwait | 6 – 8 | Oman |
|---|---|---|
| Al-Safi 9', 13'; Al-Saqer 11', 29'; Al-Mas 26' (o.g.); Al-Eid 28' | Report | Al-Sinani 3', 7'; Al-Mas 4'; H. Al-Araimi 10'; Al-Alawi 20'; Al-Zaabi 21'; Y. Al-Araimi 33', 35' |

Al-Musannah Sports City, Muscat

28 February 2011
12:00

| China | 4 – 1 | Kuwait |
|---|---|---|
| Yilihanmu Aihaiti 17'; Han Xue 25', 26'; Gui Qixuan 28' | Report | Al-Saqer 15' |

Al-Musannah Sports City, Muscat

28 February 2011
17:00

| Oman | 11 – 3 | Iraq |
|---|---|---|
| Al-Mas 1', 19', 36', 36'; H. Al-Araimi 15'; Y. Al-Araimi 24', 32'; Al-Alawi 26', 35'; Al-Zaabi 28', 29' | Report | Hussein Jabbar 5', 36'; Moshtak Kadhim 32' |

Al-Musannah Sports City, Muscat

1 March 2011
13:15

| Iraq | 5 – 4 (a.e.t.) | Kuwait |
|---|---|---|
| Hussein Jabbar 7', 14', 18', 39'; Sadeq Jabr 27' | Report | Al-Jaser 6', 12', 35'; Al-Safi 17' |

Al-Musannah Sports City, Muscat

1 March 2011
17:00

| Oman | 1 – 0 | China |
|---|---|---|
| Al-Dhabit 2' | Report |

Al-Musannah Sports City, Muscat

=== Group B ===
| Team | Pld | W | W+ | L | GF | GA | GD | Pts |
|---|---|---|---|---|---|---|---|---|
| Iran | 2 | 1 | 1 | 0 | 10 | 4 | +6 | 5 |
| Japan | 2 | 1 | 0 | 1 | 13 | 9 | +4 | 3 |
| Syria | 2 | 0 | 0 | 2 | 4 | 14 | −10 | 0 |

27 February 2011
15:45

| Japan | 9 – 4 | Syria |
|---|---|---|
| Kawaharazuka 2', 17', 22'; Yamauchi 5', 30', 35'; Oda 29'; Tabata 33', 33' | Report | Akil 10'; Arnaout 17'; Shatta 26'; Nassif 33' |

Al-Musannah Sports City, Muscat

28 February 2011
14:30

| Iran | 5 – 0 | Syria |
|---|---|---|
| Boloukbashi 6', 21'; Mesigar 18'; Naderi 23'; Ahmadzadeh 35' | Report |

Al-Musannah Sports City, Muscat

1 March 2011
15:45

| Japan | 4 – 5 (a.e.t.) | Iran |
|---|---|---|
| Yamauchi 4'; Kawaharazuka 20', 24'; Wakabayashi 38' | Report | Ahmadzadeh 9'; Naderi 12', 18'; Abdollahi 37'; Hassani 39' |

Al-Musannah Sports City, Muscat

=== Group C ===
| Team | Pld | W | W+ | L | GF | GA | GD | Pts |
|---|---|---|---|---|---|---|---|---|
| United Arab Emirates | 3 | 3 | 0 | 0 | 12 | 3 | +9 | 9 |
| Bahrain | 3 | 2 | 0 | 1 | 10 | 9 | +1 | 6 |
| Uzbekistan | 3 | 1 | 0 | 2 | 11 | 9 | +2 | 3 |
| Indonesia | 3 | 0 | 0 | 3 | 6 | 18 | −12 | 0 |

27 February 2011
12:00

| Bahrain | 4 – 3 | Uzbekistan |
|---|---|---|
| Darwish 17'; Yousef 17', 18'; Jamal 18' | Report | Elibaev 7'; Sharipov 9', 15' |

Al-Musannah Sports City, Muscat

27 February 2011
14:30

| Indonesia | 1 – 6 | United Arab Emirates |
|---|---|---|
| Dwipayudha 1' | Report | W. Mohammed 7'; Ranjabar 9'; A. Karim 13', 28'; R. Ahmed 19'; H. Al-Balooshi 32' |

Al-Musannah Sports City, Muscat

28 February 2011
13:15

| Bahrain | 5 – 2 | Indonesia |
|---|---|---|
| Jamal 6', 10'; Darwish 14'; Nesuf 16'; Hasan 25' | Report | Kariana 5'; Jumada 10' |

Al-Musannah Sports City, Muscat

28 February 2011
15:45

| United Arab Emirates | 2 – 1 | Uzbekistan |
|---|---|---|
| R. Ahmed 1'; Ranjabar 2' | Report | Sharipov 13' |

Al-Musannah Sports City, Muscat

1 March 2011
12:00

| Uzbekistan | 7 – 3 | Indonesia |
|---|---|---|
| Anorov 4', 30'; Sattorov 9', 22'; Sharipov 26', 27', 36' | Report | Parimawan 6'; Darmasuta 16'; Metrajaya 22' |

Al-Musannah Sports City, Muscat

1 March 2011
14:30

| United Arab Emirates | 4 – 1 | Bahrain |
|---|---|---|
| A. Karim 4'; R. Ahmed 13'; Al-Mesaabi 24'; Ranjabar 34' | Report | Hasan 33' |

Al-Musannah Sports City, Muscat

=== Third placed teams ===
Because some groups contain four teams and some three, matches against the fourth-placed team in each group are not included in this ranking.

| Team | Pld | W | W+ | L | GF | GA | GD | Pts |
|---|---|---|---|---|---|---|---|---|
| Uzbekistan | 2 | 0 | 0 | 2 | 4 | 6 | −2 | 0 |
| Syria | 2 | 0 | 0 | 2 | 4 | 14 | −10 | 0 |
| Iraq | 2 | 0 | 0 | 2 | 5 | 16 | −11 | 0 |

== Knockout stage ==
Quarter-finals
2 March 2011
Iran | 5
Uzbekistan | 3
2 March 2011
Oman | 5
Syria | 2
2 March 2011
Japan | 6
Bahrain | 2
2 March 2011
United Arab Emirates | 5
China | 1

Semi-finals
3 March 2011
Iran | 2 (0)
Oman (pen.) | 2 (1)
3 March 2011
Japan | 2
United Arab Emirates | 1

Final
4 March 2011
Oman | 1
Japan | 2
Third place
4 March 2011
Iran | 6
United Arab Emirates | 2

=== Quarter finals ===
2 March 2011
13:15

| Iran | 5 – 3 | Uzbekistan |
|---|---|---|
| Abdollahi 15'; Ahmadzadeh 28'; Mesigar 29'; Hassani 33', 36' | Report | Samegov 13', 36'; Azizov 26' |

Al-Musannah Sports City, Muscat

2 March 2011
14:30

| Japan | 6 – 2 | Bahrain |
|---|---|---|
| Yamauchi 6', 36'; Arakaki 13', 21'; Kawaharazuka 17'; Oda 22' | Report | Jamal 25', 30' |

Al-Musannah Sports City, Muscat

2 March 2011
15:45

| United Arab Emirates | 5 – 1 | China |
|---|---|---|
| A. Karim 1', 4', 7'; R. Ahmed 3'; Ranjabar 36' | Report | Qiu Hao 13' |

Al-Musannah Sports City, Muscat

2 March 2011
17:00

| Oman | 5 – 2 | Syria |
|---|---|---|
| Y. Al-Araimi 7', 20'; Al-Mas 18'; Al-Sinani 20', 27' | Report | Nassif 7'; Al-Najjar 34' |

Al-Musannah Sports City, Muscat

=== Semi finals ===
3 March 2011
15:45

| Japan | 2 – 1 | United Arab Emirates |
|---|---|---|
| Kawaharazuka 12'; Yamauchi 15' | Report | A. Karim 35' |

Al-Musannah Sports City, Muscat

3 March 2011
17:00

| Iran | 2 – 2 (a.e.t.) | Oman |
|---|---|---|
| Ahmadzadeh 22'; Boloukbashi 29' | Report | Al-Sinani 5'; Al-Zaabi 9' |
Penalties
| Mesigar (penalty missed) | 0 – 1 | (penalty scored) Al-Sinani |

Al-Musannah Sports City, Muscat

=== Third place play off ===
4 March 2011
15:45

| Iran | 6 – 2 | United Arab Emirates |
|---|---|---|
| Mesigar 1', 25'; Dara 11', 36'; Hassani 35'; Ahmadzadeh 35' | Report | R. Ahmed 18'; Sadeqi 29' |

Al-Musannah Sports City, Muscat

=== Final ===
4 March 2011
17:00

| Oman | 1 – 2 | Japan |
|---|---|---|
| Al-Mas 1' | Report | Kawaharazuka 26'; Arakaki 35' |

Al-Musannah Sports City, Muscat

== Winners ==
(2011) FIFA Beach Soccer World Cup
Qualification (AFC) Winners:

Japan
Second title

== Awards ==
Best Player (MVP)
(Oman) Yahya Al-Araimi
Top Scorer(s)
| (Japan) Takeshi Kawaharazuka | (Oman) Ishaq Al-Mas |
8 goals
Best Goalkeeper
(Japan) Shingo Terukina

== Top scorers ==
8 goals

- (Japan) Takeshi Kawaharazuka
- (Oman) Ishaq Al-Mas

7 goals

- (Iraq) Hussein Jabbar
- (Japan) Shusei Yamauchi
- (United Arab Emirates) Ali Hassan Karim

6 goals

- (Oman) Yahya Al-Araimi
- (Uzbekistan) Jamoliddin Sharipov

5 goals

- (Bahrain) Rashed Jamal
- (Iran) Mohammad Ahmadzadeh
- (Oman) Jalal Al-Sinani
- (United Arab Emirates) Rashid Ahmed Hassan

4 goals

- (China) Han Xue
- (Iran) Mehdi Hassani
- (Iran) Moslem Mesigar
- (Oman) Khaild Al-Zaabi
- (United Arab Emirates) Adel Ranjabar

3 goals

- (China) Gui Qixuan
- (Iran) Farid Boloukbashi
- (Iran) Ali Naderi

3 goals (cont.)

- (Kuwait) Omar Al-Jaser
- (Kuwait) Abdulwahhab Al-Safi
- (Kuwait) Youssef Al-Saqer
- (Oman) Yaqoob Al-Alawi

2 goals

- (Bahrain) Mohamed Darwish
- (Bahrain) Ebrahim Hasan
- (Bahrain) Yaqoob Nesuf
- (Bahrain) Talal Yousef
- (China) Qiu Hao
- (Iran) Hassan Abdollahi
- (Iran) Farough Dara
- (Iraq) Sadeq Jabr
- (Japan) Takashi Arakaki
- (Japan) Hirofumi Oda
- (Japan) Teruki Tabata
- (Oman) Haitham Al-Araimi
- (Syria) Mohammad Nassif
- (Uzbekistan) Javlon Anorov
- (Uzbekistan) Fakhriddin Samegov
- (Uzbekistan) Abdusattor Sattorov

1 goal

- (China) Yilihanmu Aihaiti
- (Indonesia) Gede Darmasuta
- (Indonesia) Dewa Kadek Dwipayudha

1 goal (cont.)

- (Indonesia) Nyoman Jumada
- (Indonesia) Komang Kariana
- (Indonesia) Wayan Metrajaya
- (Indonesia) Juli Parimawan
- (Iraq) Moshtak Kadhim
- (Japan) Kunihiro Wakabayashi
- (Kuwait) Abdulaziz Al-Eid
- (Oman) Hani Al-Dhabit
- (Syria) Omar Akil
- (Syria) Omar Al-Najjar
- (Syria) Alaa Arnaout
- (Syria) Ahmad Shatta
- (United Arab Emirates) Humaid Al-Balooshi
- (United Arab Emirates) Rami Al-Mesaabi
- (United Arab Emirates) Walid Mohammed
- (United Arab Emirates) Qambar Sadeqi
- (Uzbekistan) Furkat Azizov
- (Uzbekistan) Nodir Elibaev

Own goal

- (Oman) Ishaq Al-Mas (for Kuwait)

== Final standings ==
| Rank | Team |
|---|---|
| 1 | Japan |
| 2 | Oman |
| 3 | Iran |
| 4 | United Arab Emirates |
| 5 | China |
| 6 | Bahrain |
| 7 | Uzbekistan |
| 8 | Syria |
| 9 | Iraq |
| 10 | Kuwait |
| 11 | Indonesia |
