= Thailand national beach soccer team =

National league sports team

Thailand
- Association: Football Association of Thailand
- Confederation: AFC (Asia)
- Sub-confederation: AFF (Southeast Asia)
- FIFA code: THA
- BSWW ranking: 37 ▲2 (2 September 2026)
First colours
Second colours
Third colours

Biggest win
- Thailand 7–4 Philippines (Da Nang, Vietnam, 5 December 2016)

Biggest defeat
- Iran 14–2 Thailand (Muscat, Oman, 10 December 2010); Iran 13–1 Thailand (Sanya, China, 25 April 2026)

The Thailand national beach soccer team represents Thailand in international beach soccer.

== Tournament records ==
=== FIFA Beach Soccer World Cup ===
In 2002, Thailand made a 4th-place finish in Brazil after losing third-place playoff final against Uruguay. The team were drawn into group A alongside Brazil and managed to beat France and Spain to reach the semifinal and lost 3–2 to Portugal. Thailand's goalkeeper Vilard Normcharoen was voted goalkeeper of the tournament.

In the 2005 edition, Thailand were again drawn into the same group as Brazil and Spain but they found goals hard to come by and finished bottom of group A.

FIFA Beach Soccer World Cup record
Year	Result	Position	GP	W	W+	L	GS	GA
(Brazil) 1995 to 2001	did not enter							
(Brazil) 2002	Fourth place	5	2	0	3	14	21	-7
(Brazil) 2003 and 2004	did not enter							
(Brazil) 2005	11th place	2	0	0	2	3	13	-10
(Brazil) 2006 to (Italy) 2011	did not enter							
(French Polynesia) 2013 to (Seychelles) 2025	did not qualify							
Total	Fourth place	7	2	0	5	17	34	-17

=== AFC Beach Soccer Championship ===
AFC Beach Soccer Championship record
Year	Result	GP	W	W+	L	GS	GA	GD
(United Arab Emirates) 2006 to (Oman) 2011	did not enter							
(Qatar) 2013	13th place	3	0	0	3	6	11	–5
(Qatar) 2015	13th place	2	0	0	2	3	11	–8
(Malaysia) 2017	10th place	2	0	0	2	3	9	–6
(Thailand) 2019	12th place	3	1	0	2	8	10	–2
(Thailand) 2023	Quarter-finals	4	2	0	2	11	11	0
(Thailand) 2025	Quarter-finals	4	2	1	1	15	11	+4
Total	Quarter-finals	18	5	1	12	46	63	–17

=== Asian Beach Games ===
In 2012, FA of Thailand appointed Mr Kittipat Meesuwan as chairman of beach soccer committee, and he appointed Mr Abolfazl Khodabandehloo as technical director and Mr Shahram Danehkar as head coach. 2012 Asian Beach Games in China is their nearest aim.

Asian Beach Games record
Year	Result	GP	W	W+	L	GS	GA	GD
(Indonesia) 2008	Group stage	3	0	1	2	7	11	-4
(Oman) 2010	Group stage	3	0	0	3	8	29	-21
(China) 2012	Group stage	3	1	0	2	4	8	-4
(Thailand) 2014	Quarter-finals	6	4	0	2	19	15	+4
(Vietnam) 2016	Quarter-finals	3	2	0	1	10	7	+3
(China) 2026	Group stage	3	0	0	3	8	25	-17
Total	Best: Quarter-Final	21	7	1	13	56	95	–39

=== AFF Beach Soccer Championship ===
AFF Beach Soccer Championship record
Year	Result	GP	W	W+	L	GS	GA
(Malaysia) 2014	Third Place	5	3	1	1	19	14
(Indonesia) 2018	Runners-up	5	4	0	1	25	16
(Thailand) 2019	Champions	4	4	0	0	17	10
(Thailand) 2022	Champions	2	2	0	0	8	4
Total	Best: Champions	16	13	1	2	69	44

=== Others ===
- Australia Beach Soccer Cup

Runner-Up (1): 2013

== Staff ==
Position	Name
Manager	Tiranan Kanchanhom
Head coach	Abolfazl Khodabandehloo

=== Squad ===
As of October 2014. Note: Flags indicate national team as defined under FIFA eligibility rules; some limited exceptions apply. Players may hold more than one non-FIFA nationality.

No.	Pos.	Nation	Player
1	GK	THA	Chukiat Chimwong
2	GK	THA	Prakit Dankhunthod
3		THA	Natee Jeepon
4	DF	THA	Kittin Lorjanad
5	DF	THA	Pongsak Khongkaew
6	MF	THA	Manus Madtoha
7	MF	THA	Piyapong Songpiew

No.	Pos.	Nation	Player
8		THA	Keerati Jongsatisatean
9		THA	Tanandon Praracha
10	FW	THA	Komkrit Nanan
11		THA	Chattana
12	GK	THA	Parinya Pandee
13	MF	THA	Vitoon Tapinna
14		THA	Anuphong Pramanee
