= 2025 CONCACAF Beach Soccer Championship =

Beach soccer tournament

2025 FIFA Beach Soccer World Cup CONCACAF qualifier

Tournament details
- Host country: Bahamas
- City: Nassau
- Dates: 11–16 March
- Teams: 8 (from 1 confederation)
- Venue: 1 (in 1 host city)

Final positions
- Champions: El Salvador (3rd title)
- Runners-up: Guatemala
- Third place: United States
- Fourth place: Bahamas

Tournament statistics
- Matches played: 16
- Goals scored: 98 (6.13 per match)
- Top scorer: (El Salvador) Emerson Cerna (6 goals)

The 2025 CONCACAF Beach Soccer Championship was the eleventh edition of the CONCACAF Beach Soccer Championship, the premier beach soccer tournament contested by CONCACAF teams. The tournament took place at the Malcolm Park Beach Soccer Facility in Nassau, Bahamas.

The two finalists qualified to the 2025 FIFA Beach Soccer World Cup. The defending champions, United States, lost to eventual champions El Salvador in the semi-finals.

== Teams ==
A total of 8 teams competed in the tournament.

Team	Appearance	Previous best performance
Bahamas (hosts)	9th	Fourth place (2023)
Costa Rica	11th	Runners-up (2009, 2015)
El Salvador	10th	Champions (2009, 2021)
Guatemala	7th	Third place (2021)
Mexico	11th	Champions (2008, 2011, 2015, 2019)
Panama	6th	Champions (2017)
Trinidad and Tobago	7th	Quarter-finals (2015, 2017, 2019, 2021, 2023)
United States (title holders)	11th	Champions (2006, 2013, 2023)

== Draw ==
The draw was held at 11:00 EST on 26 November 2024 at CONCACAF headquarters in Miami, United States. The 8 teams were drawn into two groups of four.

The teams were first divided into four pots of two based on their CONCACAF Beach Soccer Ranking as of 26 February 2024. The highest ranked teams were placed in Pot 1, down through to the lowest ranked teams placed in Pot 4. The teams from each of Pots 1–4 were drawn, drawing all teams from one pot before moving onto the next.

Pot 1	Pot 2	Pot 3	Pot 4
United States (1); Mexico (2)	El Salvador (3); Panama (4)	Bahamas (5) (hosts); Costa Rica (6)	Guatemala (7); Trinidad and Tobago (8)

The numbers in parentheses show the CONCACAF ranking of the teams as of 26 February 2024, out of 19 nations.

== Squads ==
Each team submitted a squad of 12 players, including a minimum of two goalkeepers.

== Group stage ==
The top two teams from each group advanced to the semi-finals.

Points were earned as follows:

- 3 points for a win in regulation time
- 2 points for a win in extra time
- 1 point for a win in a penalty shoot-out
- no points for a loss.

Tiebreakers

The ranking of teams in the group stage was determined as follows:

1. Points in all group matches;
2. Goal difference in all group matches;
3. Goals scored in all group matches;
4. Points in matches between the tied team;
5. Goal difference in matches between the tied team;
6. Goals scored in matches between the tied team;
7. Fair play points;
8. Drawing of lots.

All times are local, EST (UTC−5).

=== Group A ===
Pos	Team	Pld	W	WE	WP	L	GF	GA	GD	Pts	Qualification
1	El Salvador	3	3	0	0	0	20	7	+13	9	Semi-finals
2	Guatemala	3	2	0	0	1	9	11	−2	6	Semi-finals
3	Mexico	3	1	0	0	2	12	12	0	3	
4	Costa Rica	3	0	0	0	3	3	14	−11	0	

Source: Concacaf
Rules for classification: Tiebreakers
11 March 2025
14:00

El Salvador	6–1	Costa Rica
Castro 4', 25'; Cerna 14', 30'; Urbina 19'; González 29' (pen.)	Report	Valencia 5'

Malcolm Park Beach Soccer Facility, Nassau
Referee: Juan Andrés Ángeles (Dominican Republic)
11 March 2025
16:00

Mexico	3–4	Guatemala
Maldonado 10', 33'; Acevedo 26'	Report	Lem 5', 27'; Pérez 6'; Crocker 22'

Malcolm Park Beach Soccer Facility, Nassau
Referee: Jorge Tuñón (Panama)

12 March 2025
14:00

Guatemala	0–7	El Salvador
	Report	Ruiz 4'; Ramos 16', 25'; Castro 26'; Batres 31'; Velásquez 32'; Cerna 36'

Malcolm Park Beach Soccer Facility, Nassau
Referee: Alexander Vetia (Cuba)
12 March 2025
16:00

Costa Rica	1–3	Mexico
Jimenez 32'	Report	Acevedo 14'; Macías 15'; López 26' (pen.)

Malcolm Park Beach Soccer Facility, Nassau
Referee: Juan Andrés Ángeles (Dominican Republic)

13 March 2025
14:00

Costa Rica	1–5	Guatemala
Arguello 36'	Report	Crocker 1'; M. González 12'; Marroquín 20'; López 24', 28'

Malcolm Park Beach Soccer Facility, Nassau
Referee: Arian Crespo (Cuba)
13 March 2025
16:00

Mexico	6–7	El Salvador
Morales 23'; Maldonado 23', 29'; López 26'; García 31'; Montes de Oca 31'	Report	Castro 3'; Velásquez 4'; Cerna 5', 21'; González 21', 26'; Batres 21'

Malcolm Park Beach Soccer Facility, Nassau
Referee: Jorge Tuñón (Panama)

=== Group B ===
Pos	Team	Pld	W	WE	WP	L	GF	GA	GD	Pts	Qualification
1	Bahamas (H)	3	2	0	0	1	10	8	+2	6	Semi-finals
2	United States	3	1	0	1	1	9	6	+3	4	Semi-finals
3	Panama	3	1	0	1	1	8	10	−2	4	
4	Trinidad and Tobago	3	0	0	0	3	9	12	−3	0	

Source: Concacaf
Rules for classification: Tiebreakers
(H) Host
11 March 2025
18:00

United States	2–2	Trinidad and Tobago
Canale 7'; Silveira 18'	Report	Gregory 10', 33'
Penalties
Navas (penalty scored); Silveira (penalty scored); Perea (penalty scored); Canale (penalty scored)	4–1	(penalty missed) Williams; (penalty scored) Riley; (penalty missed) Peters

Malcolm Park Beach Soccer Facility, Nassau
Referee: Jonathan Hernández (Costa Rica)
11 March 2025
20:00

Panama	2–2	Bahamas
Maquensi 16'; Kelly 33'	Report	Ferguson 6'; Julmis 15'
Penalties
R. Garcia (penalty scored); Escobar (penalty scored); Del Rosario (penalty scored); Kelly (penalty missed); Maquensi (penalty scored)	4–3	(penalty scored) Julmis; (penalty scored) Williams; (penalty scored) Ferguson; (penalty missed) Adderley; (penalty missed) St Fleur

Malcolm Park Beach Soccer Facility, Nassau
Referee: Mario Nava (Mexico)

12 March 2025
18:00

Trinidad and Tobago	3–5	Panama
Joseph 5'; Woodley 11' (pen.), 24'	Report	García 4', 35'; Maquensi 6', 12', 31'

Malcolm Park Beach Soccer Facility, Nassau
Referee: Fernando Calvillo (Guatemala)
12 March 2025
20:00

Bahamas	3–2	United States
Adderley 21'; Julmis 26'; Munnings 33'	Report	Valcarcel 6', 34'

Malcolm Park Beach Soccer Facility, Nassau
Referee: Gonzalo Carballo (El Salvador)

13 March 2025
18:00

United States	5–1	Panama
Carvalho 7', 12'; Navas 21', 28'; Silveira 26'	Report	Maquensi 19'

Malcolm Park Beach Soccer Facility, Nassau
Referee: Mario Nava (Mexico)
13 March 2025
20:00

Bahamas	5–4	Trinidad and Tobago
Julmis 10'; Chery 11'; Bailey 14' (o.g.); Adderley 18'; Williams 30'	Report	Riley 3', 12'; Gregory 16'; Coker 20'

Malcolm Park Beach Soccer Facility, Nassau
Referee: Julio Josué Ramos Mejía (El Salvador)

== Knockout stage ==
Semi-finals
15 March
El Salvador (p)	1 (7)
United States	1 (6)
15 March
Bahamas	2
Guatemala	3

Final
16 March
El Salvador	2
Guatemala	1
Third place match
16 March
United States	6
Bahamas	2

=== Semi-finals ===
Winners qualified for the 2025 FIFA Beach Soccer World Cup.

15 March 2025
18:00

El Salvador	1–1 (a.e.t.)	United States
Cerna 17'	Report	Chavez 25'
Penalties
Velásquez (penalty scored); Cruz (penalty missed); Ramos (penalty scored); Castro (penalty scored); González (penalty scored); Ruiz (penalty scored); Cerna (penalty scored); Robles (penalty scored)	7–6	(penalty scored) Navas; (penalty missed) Silveira; (penalty scored) Perea; (penalty scored) Canale; (penalty scored) Carvalho; (penalty scored) Valcarcel; (penalty scored) Akol; (penalty missed) Rezende

Malcolm Park Beach Soccer Facility, Nassau
Referee: Arian Crespo (Cuba)
15 March 2025
20:00

Bahamas	2–3	Guatemala
Julmis 14'; Adderley 24'	Report	M. González 3'; López 11'; Crocker 31'

Malcolm Park Beach Soccer Facility, Nassau
Referee: Juan Andrés Ángeles (Dominican Republic)

=== Third place match ===
16 March 2025
18:00

United States	6–2	Bahamas
Perea 11'; Chavez 13'; Akol 22'; Valcarcel 24'; Carvalho 30'; Silveira 31'	Report	Butler 6'; Julmis 32'

Malcolm Park Beach Soccer Facility, Nassau
Referee: Julio Josué Ramos Mejía (El Salvador)

=== Final ===
16 March 2025
20:00

El Salvador	2–1	Guatemala
Robles 12'; Nájera 14'	Report	M. González 7'

Malcolm Park Beach Soccer Facility, Nassau
Referee: Gumercindo Batista (Panama)

== Awards ==
=== Winners trophy ===
2025 CONCACAF Beach Soccer Championship
champions

El Salvador
Third title

=== Individual Awards ===
The following awards were presented at the conclusion of the tournament:

Golden Ball (Best Player)
(El Salvador) Emerson Cerna
Golden Boot (Top scorer)
(El Salvador) Emerson Cerna
6 goals
Golden Glove (Best goalkeeper)
(El Salvador) Eliodoro Portillo
Youth Player Award
(The Bahamas) Wood Julmis
Fair Play Award
El Salvador

== Goalscorers ==
There were 98 goals scored in 16 matches, for an average of 6.12 goals per match.

6 goals

- (El Salvador) Emerson Cerna

5 goals

- (The Bahamas) Wood Julmis
- (Panama) Alfonso Maquensi

4 goals

- (El Salvador) Andersson Castro
- (Mexico) Ramón Maldonado

3 goals

- (The Bahamas) Brandon Adderley
- (El Salvador) Melvin González
- (Guatemala) Pablo Crocker
- (Guatemala) Miguel González
- (Guatemala) Edwin López
- (Trinidad and Tobago) Akinola Gregory
- (United States) Ricardo Carvalho
- (United States) Gabriel Silveira
- (United States) Cody Valcarcel

2 goals

- (El Salvador) Rubén Batres
- (El Salvador) Heber Ramos
- (El Salvador) Frank Velásquez
- (Guatemala) José Lem
- (Mexico) Héctor Acevedo
- (Mexico) Enoch López
- (Panama) Eliecer García
- (Trinidad and Tobago) Jordan Riley
- (Trinidad and Tobago) Kevon Woodley
- (United States) Antonio Chavez
- (United States) Andrés Navas

1 goal

- (The Bahamas) Michael Butler
- (The Bahamas) Lekenson Chery
- (The Bahamas) Creven Ferguson
- (The Bahamas) Timothy Munnings
- (The Bahamas) Kyle Williams
- (Costa Rica) Carlos Arguello
- (Costa Rica) Eddie Jimenez
- (Costa Rica) Jesus Valencia
- (El Salvador) Erick Nájera
- (El Salvador) Elmer Robles
- (El Salvador) Agustín Ruiz
- (El Salvador) Jason Urbina
- (Guatemala) Berny Marroquín
- (Guatemala) Samuel Pérez
- (Mexico) Alejandro García
- (Mexico) Gabriel Macías
- (Mexico) Jacob Montes de Oca
- (Mexico) Juan Morales
- (Panama) Alberto Kelly
- (Trinidad and Tobago) Zane Coker
- (Trinidad and Tobago) Jay-Son Joseph
- (United States) Tomás Canale
- (United States) Nicolás Perea
- (United States) Tanner Akol

1 own goal

- (Trinidad and Tobago) Jesse Bailey (against Bahamas)

Source: CONCACAF

== Qualified teams for FIFA Beach Soccer World Cup ==
The following two teams from CONCACAF qualified for the 2025 FIFA Beach Soccer World Cup.

Team	Qualified on	Previous appearances in FIFA Beach Soccer World Cup^{1} only FIFA era (since 2005)
El Salvador	15 March 2025	5 (2008, 2009, 2011, 2013, 2021)
Guatemala	15 March 2025	0 (Debut)

^{1} Bold indicates champions for that year. Italic indicates hosts for that year.
