= 2023 CONCACAF Beach Soccer Championship =

Beach soccer tournament

2024 FIFA Beach Soccer World Cup CONCACAF qualifier

Tournament details
- Host country: Bahamas
- City: Nassau
- Dates: 8–14 May
- Teams: 12 (from 1 confederation)
- Venue: 1 (in 1 host city)

Final positions
- Champions: United States (3rd title)
- Runners-up: Mexico
- Third place: El Salvador
- Fourth place: Bahamas

Tournament statistics
- Matches played: 26
- Goals scored: 197 (7.58 per match)

The 2023 CONCACAF Beach Soccer Championship was the tenth edition of the CONCACAF Beach Soccer Championship, the premier beach soccer tournament contested by CONCACAF teams. The tournament took place at the Malcolm Park Beach Soccer Facility in Nassau, Bahamas.

The defending champions and the hosts were both eliminated in the semi-finals. The United States, which won the tournament for the third time, qualified to the 2024 FIFA Beach Soccer World Cup along with runner-ups Mexico as the top two CONCACAF teams.

== Teams ==
A total of 12 teams competed in the tournament.

Team	Appearance	Previous best performance
Bahamas (hosts)	8th	Quarter-finals (2015, 2017, 2019)
Belize	5th	Round 1 (2015, 2017, 2019)
Costa Rica	10th	Runners-up (2009, 2015)
Dominican Republic	2nd	Round 1 (2021)
El Salvador (title holders)	9th	Champions (2009, 2021)
Guadeloupe	4th	Fourth place (2017)
Guatemala	6th	Third place (2021)
Mexico	10th	Champions (2008, 2011, 2015, 2019)
Panama	5th	Champions (2017)
Trinidad and Tobago	6th	Quarter-finals (2015, 2017, 2019, 2021)
Turks and Caicos Islands	5th	Round 1 (2015, 2017, 2019)
United States	10th	Champions (2006, 2013)

== Draw ==
The draw was held at 11:00 EDT on 17 March 2023 at CONCACAF headquarters in Miami, United States. The 12 teams were drawn into three groups of four.

The procedure was as follows:

The teams were first divided into four pots of three based on their CONCACAF Beach Soccer Ranking as of August 2021. The highest ranked teams were placed in Pot 1, down through to the lowest ranked teams placed in Pot 4. The three teams in Pot 1 were seeded and each automatically assigned to the head of one of the groups. The teams from Pots 2–4 were then drawn, drawing all teams from one pot before moving onto the next.

Pot 1	Pot 2	Pot 3	Pot 4
Mexico (1); El Salvador (2); United States (3)	Panama (4); Bahamas (5) (hosts); Costa Rica (6)	Guatemala (7); Trinidad and Tobago (8); Guadeloupe (9)	Belize (12); Turks and Caicos Islands (14); Dominican Republic (18)

The numbers in parentheses show the CONCACAF ranking of the teams as of August 2021, out of 19 nations.

== Squads ==
Each team had to submit a squad of 12 players, including a minimum of two goalkeepers.

== Group stage ==
Each team earns three points for a win in regulation time, two points for a win in extra time, one point for a win in a penalty shoot-out, and no points for a defeat. The top two teams from each group and the two best third placed teams advance to the quarter-finals.

All times are local, EDT (UTC−4).

=== Group A ===
Pos	Team	Pld	W	W+	WP	L	GF	GA	GD	Pts	Qualification
1	El Salvador	3	3	0	0	0	27	5	+22	9	Knockout stage
2	Costa Rica	3	2	0	0	1	19	14	+5	6	Knockout stage
3	Turks and Caicos Islands	3	1	0	0	2	10	23	−13	3	
4	Guadeloupe	3	0	0	0	3	9	23	−14	0	

Source: CONCACAF
8 May 2023
15:00

Costa Rica	8–5	Guadeloupe
Sánchez 5', 35'; Mora 6'; Pacheco 13'; Calero 24', 26', 27' (pen.); Prado 31'	Report	Bordelai 6', 29'; Mezence 14'; Andre-Lubin 27'; Amadiah 33'

Malcolm Park Beach Soccer Facility, Nassau
Referee: Fernando Calvillo (Guatemala)
8 May 2023
16:30

El Salvador	10–3	Turks and Caicos Islands
Urbina 2', 34'; Perdomo 3', 16', 24'; Velásquez 6', 24', 31'; Ramos 12'; Rauda 17'	Report	Brooks 4'; Forbes 12'; Jerome 36'

Malcolm Park Beach Soccer Facility, Nassau
Referee: Arian Crespo (Cuba)

9 May 2023
15:00

Turks and Caicos Islands	2–10	Costa Rica
Forbes 10', 32'	Report	Prado 7'; Peña 10'; Calero 12', 25', 30'; Pacheco 13'; Mora 19', 27', 33'

Malcolm Park Beach Soccer Facility, Nassau
Referee: Simón Estrada Carmona (Mexico)
9 May 2021
16:30

Guadeloupe	1–10	El Salvador
Andre-Lubin 36'	Report	Urbina 3', 13', 28', 36'; Rauda 9', 18'; Perdomo 14', 16'; Osorio 24'; Ramos 32'

Malcolm Park Beach Soccer Facility, Nassau
Referee: Erlis Bermúdez (Cuba)

10 May 2023
15:00

Guadeloupe	3–5	Turks and Caicos Islands
Hell 24'; Geolier 26'; Quinol 34'	Report	Evariste 3'; Sylvins 16'; Wiles 24'; Forbes 28', 30'

Malcolm Park Beach Soccer Facility, Nassau
Referee: Juan Andrés Ángeles (Dominican Republic)
10 May 2023
16:30

El Salvador	7–1	Costa Rica
Urbina 4', 21'; Cruz 12'; Perdomo 15' (pen.), 24'; Velásquez 19', 33'	Report	Calero 10'

Malcolm Park Beach Soccer Facility, Nassau
Referee: Gumercindo Batista (Panama)

=== Group B ===
Pos	Team	Pld	W	W+	WP	L	GF	GA	GD	Pts	Qualification
1	Mexico	3	3	0	0	0	15	9	+6	9	Knockout stage
2	Bahamas (H)	3	1	0	1	1	12	9	+3	4	Knockout stage
3	Guatemala	3	1	0	0	2	8	10	−2	3	Knockout stage
4	Belize	3	0	0	0	3	6	13	−7	0	

Source: CONCACAF
(H) Host
8 May 2023
18:00

Mexico	4–2	Belize
Acevedo 1', 2'; Castillo 12'; Martínez 17' (pen.)	Report	Castillo 10'; Mena 21'

Malcolm Park Beach Soccer Facility, Nassau
Referee: Marco Navarro (Costa Rica)
8 May 2023
19:30

Bahamas	2–2 (a.e.t.)	Guatemala
St. Fleur 24'; W. Julmis 30'	Report	Flores 19'; M. González 27'
Penalties
W. Julmis (penalty scored); Thompson (penalty scored); Williams (penalty missed); St. Fleur (penalty scored); Christie (penalty scored); Joseph (penalty scored)	5–4	(penalty scored) Crocker; (penalty missed) W. González; (penalty scored) Flores; (penalty scored) J. González; (penalty scored) M. González; (penalty missed) Marroquín

Malcolm Park Beach Soccer Facility, Nassau
Referee: Gumercindo Batista (Panama)

9 May 2023
18:00

Guatemala	3–6	Mexico
Marroquín 5'; Flores 16'; Lem 36'	Report	García 4'; Portilla 12'; Vizcarra 24'; Castillo 24', 24'; Martínez 26'

Malcolm Park Beach Soccer Facility, Nassau
Referee: Juan Andrés Ángeles (Dominican Republic)
9 May 2023
19:30

Belize	2–6	Bahamas
Martínez 9', 18'	Report	Thompson 7', 14'; Francois 9'; Williams 32'; E. Julmis 36'

Malcolm Park Beach Soccer Facility, Nassau
Referee: Luis Torres (Costa Rica)

10 May 2023
18:00

Guatemala	3–2	Belize
Sáenz 5'; Crocker 8'; M. González 27'	Report	Ramos 26'; Castillo 33'

Malcolm Park Beach Soccer Facility, Nassau
Referee: Jorge Tuñón (Panama)
10 May 2023
19:30

Mexico	5–4	Bahamas
Vizcarra 7'; Martínez 8', 30'; Macías 14', 21'	Report	W. Julmis 7'; Thompson 20'; Joseph 30'; Williams 32'

Malcolm Park Beach Soccer Facility, Nassau
Referee: Gonzalo Carballo (El Salvador)

=== Group C ===
Pos	Team	Pld	W	W+	WP	L	GF	GA	GD	Pts	Qualification
1	United States	3	3	0	0	0	22	4	+18	9	Knockout stage
2	Panama	3	2	0	0	1	11	7	+4	6	Knockout stage
3	Trinidad and Tobago	3	1	0	0	2	6	10	−4	3	Knockout stage
4	Dominican Republic	3	0	0	0	3	4	22	−18	0	

Source: CONCACAF
8 May 2023
12:00

Panama	2–1	Trinidad and Tobago
Maquensi 29'; Watson 32'	Report	Perry 15'

Malcolm Park Beach Soccer Facility, Nassau
Referee: Mario Nava (Mexico)
8 May 2023
13:30

United States	11–1	Dominican Republic
Perera 3', 18', 25'; Carvalho 7'; Silveira 13' (pen.); Canale 21'; Franco 24', 32', 33'; Chavez 29'; Perea 33'	Report	Lluberes 30'

Malcolm Park Beach Soccer Facility, Nassau
Referee: Gonzalo Carballo (El Salvador)

9 May 2023
12:00

Dominican Republic	1–8	Panama
Lluberes 28'	Report	Londoño 6', 15'; Watson 15', 22'; Kelly 19', 30'; R. García 26', 32'

Malcolm Park Beach Soccer Facility, Nassau
Referee: Julio Ramos Mejía (El Salvador)
9 May 2023
13:30

Trinidad and Tobago	2–6	United States
Gregory 24'; Perry 34'	Report	Perea 3', 24'; Perera 10'; Carvalho 12'; Silveira 18'; Albiston 22'

Malcolm Park Beach Soccer Facility, Nassau
Referee: Diego Najera (Guatemala)

10 May 2023
12:00

Trinidad and Tobago	3–2	Dominican Republic
Hospedales 9'; Coker 32'; Riley 36'	Report	Severino 6'; Moreta 14'

Malcolm Park Beach Soccer Facility, Nassau
Referee: Marco Navarro (Costa Rica)
10 May 2023
13:30

United States	5–1	Panama
Perera 4', 9'; Canale 22'; Toth 33'; Silveira 36'	Report	Londoño 21'

Malcolm Park Beach Soccer Facility, Nassau
Referee: Jai Robles (Mexico)

=== Ranking of third-placed teams ===
Pos	Grp	Team	Pld	W	W+	WP	L	GF	GA	GD	Pts	Qualification
1	B	Guatemala	3	1	0	0	2	8	10	−2	3	Knockout stage
2	C	Trinidad and Tobago	3	1	0	0	2	6	10	−4	3	Knockout stage
3	A	Turks and Caicos Islands	3	1	0	0	2	10	23	−13	3	

Source: CONCACAF

== Knockout stage ==
11 May was allocated as a rest day.

Quarter-finals
12 May
United States	5
Costa Rica	4
12 May
El Salvador	7
Guatemala	2
12 May
Panama	2
Bahamas	4
12 May
Mexico	2
Trinidad and Tobago	0

Semi-finals
13 May
United States	5
El Salvador	2
13 May
Bahamas	2
Mexico	3

Final
14 May
United States	5
Mexico	0
Third place match
14 May
El Salvador	3
Bahamas	2

=== Quarter-finals ===
12 May 2023
15:00

United States	5–4	Costa Rica
Rezende 3'; Canale 7'; Silveira 32', 32'; Medina 36' (o.g.)	Report	Mora 8'; Calero 12'; Pacheco 24'; Medina 33'

Malcolm Park Beach Soccer Facility, Nassau
Referee: Jorge Tuñón (Panama)
12 May 2023
16:30

El Salvador	7–2	Guatemala
Ramos 2', 33'; Perdomo 7', 24'; Urbina 16'; Cruz 16'; González 27'	Report	Lem 14'; Crocker 16'

Malcolm Park Beach Soccer Facility, Nassau
Referee: Jair Robles (Mexico)
12 May 2023
18:00

Panama	2–4	Bahamas
Del Rosario 12'; Quintero 20'	Report	Williams 6', 15'; Joseph 9'; Butler 29'

Malcolm Park Beach Soccer Facility, Nassau
Referee: Arian Crespo (Cuba)
12 May 2023
19:30

Mexico	2–0	Trinidad and Tobago
Castillo 28'; Acevedo 31'	Report

Malcolm Park Beach Soccer Facility, Nassau
Referee: Marco Navarro (Costa Rica)

=== Semi-finals ===
Winners qualify for the 2024 FIFA Beach Soccer World Cup.

13 May 2023
18:00

United States	5–2	El Salvador
Perera 2', 24'; Perea 19'; Silveira 26'; Canale 30'	Report	Ramos 24'; Velásquez 32'

Malcolm Park Beach Soccer Facility, Nassau
Referee: Gumercindo Batista (Panama)
13 May 2023
19:30

Bahamas	2–3	Mexico
Butler 23'; W. Julmis 30'	Report	Francois 4' (o.g.); Portilla 10'; Macías 35'

Malcolm Park Beach Soccer Facility, Nassau
Referee: Juan Andrés Ángeles (Dominican Republic)

=== Third place match ===
14 May 2023
18:00

El Salvador	3–2	Bahamas
Ramos 12'; Urbina 15', 18'	Report	Thompson 20'; Williams 33'

Malcolm Park Beach Soccer Facility, Nassau
Referee: Mario Nava (Mexico)

=== Final ===
14 May 2023
19:30

United States	5–0	Mexico
Silveira 3', 34'; Perera 22'; Carvalho 22'; Canale 31'	Report

Malcolm Park Beach Soccer Facility, Nassau
Referee: Gonzalo Carballo (El Salvador)

== Awards ==
=== Winners trophy ===
2023 CONCACAF Beach Soccer Championship
champions

United States
Third title

=== Individual awards ===
The following awards were given at the conclusion of the tournament:

Golden Ball (Best Player)
(United States) Nick Perera
Golden Boot (Top scorer)
(El Salvador) Jason Urbina
11 goals
Golden Glove (Best goalkeeper)
(Mexico) Gabriel Macías
Fair Play Award
Bahamas

== Top goalscorers ==
There have been 197 goals scored in 26 matches, for an average of 7.58 goals per match (as of 14 May 2023).

11 goals

- (El Salvador) Jason Urbina

9 goals

- (Costa Rica) Lonis Calero
- (El Salvador) Exon Perdomo
- (United States) Nick Perera

8 goals

- (United States) Gabriel Silveira

6 goals

- (El Salvador) Francisco Velásquez
- (El Salvador) Heber Ramos

5 goals

- (The Bahamas) Kyle Williams
- (Costa Rica) Roger Mora
- (Turks and Caicos Islands) Billy Forbes
- (United States) Tomás Canale

4 goals

- (United States) Nicolas Perea
- (The Bahamas) James Thompson
- (Mexico) Diego Martínez
- (Mexico) Gabriel Macías

3 goals

- (The Bahamas) Wood Julmis
- (Costa Rica) Greivin Pacheco
- (El Salvador) Rogelio Rauda
- (Mexico) Héctor Acevedo
- (Mexico) Cristofer Castillo
- (Panama) Jaime Londoño
- (Panama) Julio Watson
- (United States) Álvaro Franco
- (United States) Ricardo Carvalho

2 goals

- (The Bahamas) Gary Joseph
- (The Bahamas) Lesly St. Fleur
- (The Bahamas) Michael Butler
- (Belize) Kenen Castillo
- (Belize) Kenyon Martínez
- (Costa Rica) Christian Prado
- (Costa Rica) Jhonatan Sánchez
- (Dominican Republic) Yan Lluberes
- (El Salvador) Andrés Cruz
- (Guadeloupe) Gary Andre-Lubin
- (Guadeloupe) David Bordelai
- (Guatemala) Pablo Crocker
- (Guatemala) Juan Flores
- (Guatemala) Miguel González
- (Guatemala) José Lem
- (Mexico) José Vizcarra
- (Mexico) Edgar Portilla
- (Panama) Rafael García
- (Panama) Alberto Kelly
- (Trinidad and Tobago) Kareem Perry

1 goal

- (The Bahamas) Jean Francois
- (The Bahamas) Evelt Julmis
- (Belize) Jaheim Mena
- (Belize) Raymond Ramos
- (Costa Rica) Jeaustin Medina
- (Costa Rica) Daniel Peña
- (Dominican Republic) Miguel Moreta
- (Dominican Republic) Yensy Severino
- (El Salvador) Melvin González
- (El Salvador) Andrés Osorio
- (Guadeloupe) Stéphane Amadiah
- (Guadeloupe) Gael Geolier
- (Guadeloupe) Sebastien Hell
- (Guadeloupe) Ricardo Mezence
- (Guadeloupe) Marvin Quinol
- (Guatemala) Berny Marroquín
- (Guatemala) Ángel Sáenz
- (Mexico) Alejandro García
- (Panama) Nagdiel Del Rosario
- (Panama) Alfonso Maquensi
- (Panama) Luis Quintero
- (Trinidad and Tobago) Zane Coker
- (Trinidad and Tobago) Akinola Gregory
- (Trinidad and Tobago) Shane Hospedales
- (Trinidad and Tobago) Jordan Riley
- (Turks and Caicos Islands) Pendieno Brooks
- (Turks and Caicos Islands) Peterson Evariste
- (Turks and Caicos Islands) Ledson Jerome
- (Turks and Caicos Islands) Wilkins Sylvins
- (Turks and Caicos Islands) Dornell Wiles
- (United States) Christopher Albiston
- (United States) Antonio Chavez
- (United States) Conner Rezende
- (United States) Chris Toth

1 own goal

- (Costa Rica) Jeaustin Medina (against the United States)
- (The Bahamas) Jean Francois (against Mexico)

Source: CONCACAF

== Qualified teams for FIFA Beach Soccer World Cup ==
The following two teams from CONCACAF qualify for the 2024 FIFA Beach Soccer World Cup.

Team	Qualified on	Previous appearances in FIFA Beach Soccer World Cup^{1} only FIFA era (since 2005)
United States	14 May 2023	6 (2005, 2006, 2007, 2013, 2019, 2021)
Mexico	14 May 2023	6 (2007, 2008, 2011, 2015, 2017, 2019)

^{1} Bold indicates champions for that year. Italic indicates hosts for that year.
