= Puerto Rico national beach soccer team =

Represents Puerto Rico in international beach soccer competitions

Puerto Rico
- Nickname(s): El Huracán Azul (The Blue Hurricane)
- Association: Federación Puertorriqueña de Fútbol
- Confederation: CONCACAF
- Sub-confederation: CFU (Caribbean)
- Head coach: Vitor Hugo Barros
- FIFA code: PUR

First international
- Bahamas 9-1 Puerto Rico (Nassau, Bahamas; May 8, 2013)

Biggest defeat
- Bahamas 9-1 Puerto Rico (Nassau, Bahamas; May 8, 2013)

CONCACAF Beach Soccer Championship
- Appearances: 2 (first in 2013)
- Best result: Group Stage (2013, 2015)

The Puerto Rico national beach soccer team represents Puerto Rico in international beach soccer competitions and is controlled by the Federación Puertorriqueña de Fútbol, the governing body for football in Puerto Rico.

== History ==
2013 was the year when the Puerto Rico national beach soccer team was formed. Eieri Jordan was the most involved person with the project. Vitor Hugo Barros was appointed as head coach and a team mixed with young and experienced players made the trip to Nassau, Bahamas to play on the 2013 CONCACAF Beach Soccer Championship. They played on Group A against Bahamas, United States and Guatemala. However, they lost all of their matches and managed to score six goals.

They returned for the 2015 CONCACAF Beach Soccer Championship after hard work to maintain the project alive. Puerto Rico came with a totally new team managed once again by Vitor Hugo Barros and Eieri Jordan. They lost all of their matches and scored only four goals.

== Current squad ==
Note: Flags indicate national team as defined under FIFA eligibility rules; some limited exceptions apply. Players may hold more than one non-FIFA nationality.

No.	Pos.	Nation	Player
1	GK		Javier Moya
2	MF		Francisco Quiles
3	DF		Carlos Vendrell
4	FW		Joshua Martínez
5	DF		Héctor Rivera

No.	Pos.	Nation	Player
6	DF		Alex Santos
7	FW		Carlos Astondoa
8	FW		Dorian González
9	FW		Eieri Jordan
10	GK		Joseph Pereira

== Achievements ==
=== CONCACAF Beach Soccer Championship ===
Year	Round	Pos	Pld	W	W aet/pso	L	GF	GA	GD
Puntarenas, Costa Rica. 2006	Did not enter								
Puerto Vallarta, Mexico. 2008	Did not enter								
Puerto Vallarta, Mexico. 2009	Did not enter								
Puerto Vallarta, Mexico. 2011	Did not enter								
Nassau, Bahamas. 2013	Group Stage	10	4	0	0	4	6	29	-23
Costa del Sol, El Salvador. 2015	Group Stage	15	3	0	0	3	4	20	-16
Nassau, Bahamas. 2017	Did not participate								
Puerto Vallarta, Mexico. 2019	Did not participate								
San Rafael de Alajuela, Costa Rica. 2021	Did not participate								
Nassau, Bahamas. 2023	Did not participate								
Nassau, Bahamas. 2025	Did not participate								
Total	0 Titles	2/11	7	0	0	7	10	49	-39

== See also ==
- 2015 CONCACAF Beach Soccer Championship
- 2015 CONCACAF Beach Soccer Championship
- List of national association football teams by nickname
