= Belize national beach soccer team =

National sports team

Belize
- Nickname: The Jaguars
- Association: Football Federation of Belize
- Confederation: CONCACAF
- Sub-confederation: UNCAF (Central America)
- Head coach: Renan Couoh
- FIFA code: BLZ
- BSWW ranking: 75 ▼2 (2 June 2025)

CONCACAF Beach Soccer Championship
- Appearances: 5 (first in 2015)
- Best result: Group Stage (2015)

The Belize national beach soccer team represents Belize in international beach soccer competitions and is controlled by the Football Federation of Belize, the governing body for football in Belize.

== Current squad ==
Note: Flags indicate national team as defined under FIFA eligibility rules; some limited exceptions apply. Players may hold more than one non-FIFA nationality.

No.	Pos.	Nation	Player
1	GK		Frank Lopez
2	DF		Sean Mas
3	MF		John King
4	FW		Franz Nunez
5	MF		Jeremy James
6	DF		Elton Gordon

No.	Pos.	Nation	Player
7	FW		Dennis Serano
8	DF		Lloyd Nunez
9	MF		Lionel Cabral
10	MF		Keithon Dyer
11	FW		Shawn Vasquez
12	GK		Rugerri Trejo

== Achievements ==
=== CONCACAF Beach Soccer Championship ===
Year	Round	Pos	Pld	W	W aet/pso	L	GF	GA	GD
Puntarenas, Costa Rica. 2006	Did not enter								
Puerto Vallarta, Mexico. 2008	Did not enter								
Puerto Vallarta, Mexico. 2009	Did not enter								
Puerto Vallarta, Mexico. 2011	Did not enter								
Nassau, Bahamas. 2013	Did not enter								
Costa del Sol, El Salvador. 2015	Group Stage	12	3	1	0	2	13	26	-13
Nassau, Bahamas. 2017	Group Stage	13	6	2	2	2	27	22	+5
Puerto Vallarta, Mexico. 2019	Group Stage	12	3	0	0	3	9	17	-8
San Rafael de Alajuela, Costa Rica. 2021	Group Stage	11	2	0	0	2	4	14	-10
Nassau, Bahamas. 2023	Group Stage	9	3	0	0	3	6	13	-7
Nassau, Bahamas. 2025	Did not enter								
Total	0 Titles	5/11	17	3	2	12	59	92	-33
