= 2019 CONCACAF Beach Soccer Championship =

Beach soccer tournament

2019 FIFA Beach Soccer World Cup CONCACAF qualifier

Tournament details
- Host country: Mexico
- City: Puerto Vallarta
- Dates: 13–19 May
- Teams: 16 (from 1 confederation)
- Venue: 1 (in 1 host city)

Final positions
- Champions: Mexico (4th title)
- Runners-up: United States
- Third place: El Salvador
- Fourth place: Panama

Tournament statistics
- Matches played: 32
- Goals scored: 287 (8.97 per match)
- Top scorer(s): (United States) Nick Perera (13 goals)
- Best player: (Mexico) Benjamín Mosco
- Best young player: (El Salvador) Exon Perdomo
- Best goalkeeper: (Mexico) Diego Villaseñor
- Fair play award: Panama

The 2019 CONCACAF Beach Soccer Championship was the eighth edition of the CONCACAF Beach Soccer Championship, the premier beach soccer tournament contested by North American men's national teams and organised by CONCACAF (seventh official edition, tenth edition if qualifying tournaments held jointly with CONMEBOL are also counted). The tournament took place in Puerto Vallarta, Mexico between 13–19 May 2019.

The championship also acts as the qualification tournament for CONCACAF teams to the 2019 FIFA Beach Soccer World Cup in Paraguay; the top two teams qualify.

Panama were the defending champions, but lost in the third-place match.

== Teams ==
A total of 16 teams compete in the tournament.

Team	Appearance	Previous best performance
Antigua and Barbuda	3rd	
Bahamas	6th	6th place (2009, 2013, 2017)
Belize	3rd	
Bonaire	1st	Debut
Costa Rica	8th	Runner-up (2009, 2015)
El Salvador	7th	Champion (2009)
Guadeloupe	3rd	Fourth place (2017)
Guatemala	4th	5th place (2013)
Guyana	2nd	12th place (2017)
Jamaica	6th	5th place (2006)
Mexico (hosts)	8th	Champion (2008, 2011, 2015)
Panama (title holders)	3rd	Champion (2017)
Trinidad and Tobago	4th	5th place (2015)
Turks and Caicos Islands	3rd	
United States	8th	Champion (2006, 2013)
U.S. Virgin Islands	3rd	

== Draw ==
The draw was held on 8 April 2019 at the Calle Independencia in Puerto Vallarta. The 16 teams were drawn into four groups of four.

== Squads ==
Each squad can contain a maximum of 12 players.

== Group stage ==
Each team earns three points for a win in regulation time, two points for a win in extra time, one point for a win in a penalty shoot-out, and no points for a defeat. The top two teams from each group advance to the quarter-finals.

All times are local, CDT (UTC−5).

=== Group A ===
Pos	Team	Pld	W	W+	WP	L	GF	GA	GD	Pts	Qualification
1	Mexico (H)	3	3	0	0	0	16	6	+10	9	Knockout stage
2	Guatemala	3	2	0	0	1	10	10	0	6	Knockout stage
3	Costa Rica	3	1	0	0	2	13	15	−2	3	
4	Jamaica	3	0	0	0	3	5	13	−8	0	

Source: CONCACAF
Rules for classification: Group stage tiebreakers
(H) Host
13 May 2019
14:15

Costa Rica	4–2	Jamaica
Roger Mora 2'; Frandert Arrieta 6'; Christian Sánchez 33'; Jhonatan Sánchez 34'	Report	Renae Lloyd 14'; Ryan Powell 27'

Puerto Vallarta Stadium, Puerto Vallarta
Referee: Juan Andrés Ángeles (Dominican Republic)
13 May 2019
18:00

Guatemala	0–4	Mexico
	Report	Néstor Martínez 17'; Abdiel Villa 18', 24'; Ulises Torres 29'

Puerto Vallarta Stadium, Puerto Vallarta
Referee: Gonzalo Carballo (El Salvador)

14 May 2019
14:15

Costa Rica	4–5	Guatemala
Jhonatan Sánchez 14'; Xavier Jiménez 22'; Estiven Espinoza 26'; Christian Sánchez 34'	Report	Miguel González 2', 24'; Ángel Sáenz 21' (pen.), 27'; Álex Morán 27'

Puerto Vallarta Stadium, Puerto Vallarta
Referee: Arian Crespo (Cuba)
14 May 2019
18:00

Mexico	4–1	Jamaica
Diego Villaseñor 12'; Ulises Torres 21'; Benjamín Mosco 25'; José Vizarra 30'	Report	Jermain Anderson 30'

Puerto Vallarta Stadium, Puerto Vallarta
Referee: David Cruz (El Salvador)

15 May 2019
14:15

Jamaica	2–5	Guatemala
Barrington Planter 10' (pen.); Renae Lloyd 28'	Report	Miguel González 4' (pen.), 15'; Leandro Bachez 9'; Lester González 14'; Marco Ávila 28'

Puerto Vallarta Stadium, Puerto Vallarta
Referee: Julio Ramos Mejía (El Salvador)
15 May 2019
18:00

Mexico	8–5	Costa Rica
Ramón Maldonado 0', 8', 26', 33'; Ulises Torres 11'; Néstor Martínez 16'; Jair Alemán 20'; José Hernández 27'	Report	Roger Mora 0', 16'; Jhonatan Sánchez 2', 9'; Christian Sánchez 33'

Puerto Vallarta Stadium, Puerto Vallarta
Referee: Juan Andrés Ángeles (Dominican Republic)

=== Group B ===
Pos	Team	Pld	W	W+	WP	L	GF	GA	GD	Pts	Qualification
1	Panama	3	3	0	0	0	20	5	+15	9	Knockout stage
2	Trinidad and Tobago	3	2	0	0	1	16	6	+10	6	Knockout stage
3	U.S. Virgin Islands	3	1	0	0	2	11	21	−10	3	
4	Turks and Caicos Islands	3	0	0	0	3	7	22	−15	0	

Source: CONCACAF
Rules for classification: Group stage tiebreakers
13 May 2019
12:00

Trinidad and Tobago	6–0	Turks and Caicos Islands
Ryan Augustine 2'; Zane Coker 10', 13'; Kevon Woodley 18', 35'; Shane Hospedales 25'	Report

Puerto Vallarta Stadium, Puerto Vallarta
Referee: David Cruz (El Salvador)
13 May 2019
15:30

U.S. Virgin Islands	1–8	Panama
Joseph Leto 32'	Report	Xavier García 1'; Alfonso Maquensi 11', 12', 28'; Rafael García 14', 17', 26'; Eliecer García 18'

Puerto Vallarta Stadium, Puerto Vallarta
Referee: Arian Crespo (Cuba)

14 May 2019
12:00

Trinidad and Tobago	7–2	U.S. Virgin Islands
Kevon Woodley 2', 18', 20' (pen.); Jesse Bailey 9', 30'; Hakeem King 11' (pen.), 17'	Report	Rakeem Joseph 3'; Joseph Leto 10'

Puerto Vallarta Stadium, Puerto Vallarta
Referee: Warner Porras (Costa Rica)
14 May 2019
16:45

Panama	8–1	Turks and Caicos Islands
Eliecer García 10', 17'; Alfonso Maquensi 14', 16', 24'; Rafael García 23', 28', 34'	Report	Herby Magny 23'

Puerto Vallarta Stadium, Puerto Vallarta

16 May 2019
15:30

Turks and Caicos Islands	6–8	U.S. Virgin Islands
Alex Bryan 4', 9', 31'; Jeff Beljour 6', 9'; Lenford Singh 29'	Report	Emiliano Aranes 9', 27', 35'; Esais Charles 13'; Rakeem Joseph 20'; Vincent Schultz 20'; Michael Vollmer 22'; Carlos Labrada 33'

Puerto Vallarta Stadium, Puerto Vallarta
Referee: Arquel Carrasco (Panama)
16 May 2019
18:00

Panama	4–3	Trinidad and Tobago
Alfonso Maquensi 3', 18'; Rafael García 13'; Eliecer García 25'	Report	Jesse Bailey 2'; Kevon Woodley 8', 14'

Puerto Vallarta Stadium, Puerto Vallarta
Referee: Arian Crespo (Cuba)

=== Group C ===
Pos	Team	Pld	W	W+	WP	L	GF	GA	GD	Pts	Qualification
1	United States	3	3	0	0	0	28	5	+23	9	Knockout stage
2	Bahamas	3	2	0	0	1	21	9	+12	6	Knockout stage
3	Antigua and Barbuda	3	1	0	0	2	15	22	−7	3	
4	Bonaire	3	0	0	0	3	7	35	−28	0	

Source: CONCACAF
Rules for classification: Group stage tiebreakers
13 May 2019
10:45

Bahamas	7–4	Antigua and Barbuda
Gary Joseph 1'; Timothy Munnings 4'; Jean Francois 7', 25'; Lesly St. Fleur 12'; Kyle Williams 19', 28'	Report	Elvis Thomas 2'; Kevin Richards 27'; Chevon Moore 31'; O'Dell Murray 33'

Puerto Vallarta Stadium, Puerto Vallarta
Referee: Miguel López (Guatemala)
13 May 2019
16:45

Bonaire	1–14	United States
Henrich Beaumont 27'	Report	Tanner Akol 1', 2'; Giandro Steba 3' (o.g.); Nick Perera 6' (pen.), 17', 23', 28', 34'; David Mondragón 19', 21'; Jason Leopoldo 21', 23' (pen.); Oscar Reyes 23'; Adriano Dos Santos 33'

Puerto Vallarta Stadium, Puerto Vallarta

15 May 2019
12:00

Bahamas	12–2	Bonaire
Michael Butler 3'; Timothy Munnings 5', 28', 32'; Jean Francois 11'; Lesly St. Fleur 12'; James Thompson 14', 20', 24'; Gavin Christie 15', 23'; Dwayne Forbes 25' (pen.)	Report	Raydolf Felix 5' (pen.); Gilbertson Piard 26'

Puerto Vallarta Stadium, Puerto Vallarta
Referee: Arquel Carrasco (Panama)
15 May 2019
15:30

United States	11–2	Antigua and Barbuda
Tomas Canale 1', 28'; Nick Perera 2', 24'; Tanner Akol 6', 7', 22', 29', 35' (pen.); Oscar Reyes 15' (pen.); Franck Tayou 31'	Report	Kevin Richards 15', 35'

Puerto Vallarta Stadium, Puerto Vallarta
Referee: Warner Porras (Costa Rica)

16 May 2019
12:00

Antigua and Barbuda	9–4	Bonaire
Kevin Richards 4'; Elvis Thomas 13' (pen.), 30'; Omarie Daniel 16', 21', 27'; Stephen Hughes 17' (pen.), 20' (pen.); Malique Jarvis 34'	Report	Giandro Steba 3', 15', 18', 24'

Puerto Vallarta Stadium, Puerto Vallarta
Referee: Miguel Aguilar (Mexico)
16 May 2019
14:15

United States	3–2	Bahamas
Tanner Akol 17', 24'; Nick Perera 33' (pen.)	Report	Timothy Munnings 28'; Jean Francois 33'

Puerto Vallarta Stadium, Puerto Vallarta
Referee: Warner Porras (Costa Rica)

=== Group D ===
Pos	Team	Pld	W	W+	WP	L	GF	GA	GD	Pts	Qualification
1	El Salvador	3	3	0	0	0	23	6	+17	9	Knockout stage
2	Guadeloupe	3	1	0	1	1	11	17	−6	4	Knockout stage
3	Guyana	3	1	0	0	2	10	13	−3	3	
4	Belize	3	0	0	0	3	9	17	−8	0	

Source: CONCACAF
Rules for classification: Group stage tiebreakers
14 May 2019
10:45

Guadeloupe	7−6	Belize
David Bordelai 8', 21', 35'; Melaick Breter 14'; Sebastien Hell 32', 33'; Ricardo Mezence 34'	Report	Evan Mariano 7'; Marlon Meza 23', 30', 35'; Raymond Ramos 25'; Wayne Ford 31'

Puerto Vallarta Stadium, Puerto Vallarta
Referee: Gumercindo Batista (Panama)
14 May 2019
15:30

Guyana	4−8	El Salvador
Shane Luckie 6'; Jamal Haynes 13', 17'; Trevon Archibald 19'	Report	Eliodoro Portillo 1'; Heber Ramos 7', 20'; Exon Perdomo 15', 28'; Agustín Ruiz 16'; Rubén Batres 17', 23'

Puerto Vallarta Stadium, Puerto Vallarta
Referee: Miguel Aguilar (Mexico)

15 May 2019
10:45

Guadeloupe	3−3 (a.e.t.)	Guyana
Gael Geolier 9'; Alan Lefort 24'; Benoit Zembama 26'	Report	Shane Luckie 11'; Michael Wilson 20'; Jamal Haynes 25'
Penalties
Ricardo Mezence (penalty scored); Sebastien Hell (penalty scored)	2−0	(penalty missed) Jarmane Grandison; (penalty missed) Shane Luckie

Puerto Vallarta Stadium, Puerto Vallarta
Referee: Gumercindo Batista (Panama)
15 May 2019
16:45

El Salvador	7−1	Belize
Rubén Batres 8'; Agustín Ruiz 14', 30'; Exon Perdomo 22', 35'; Elmer Robles 27'; Frank Velásquez 35'	Report	Wayne Ford 27'

Puerto Vallarta Stadium, Puerto Vallarta
Referee: Miguel López (Guatemala)

16 May 2019
10:45

Belize	2−3	Guyana
Wayne Ford 3'; Marlon Meza 5' (pen.)	Report	Shane Luckie 15', 20'; Simon Kanard 31'

Puerto Vallarta Stadium, Puerto Vallarta
Referee: Marco Navarro (Costa Rica)
16 May 2019
16:45

El Salvador	8−1	Guadeloupe
Frank Velásquez 0'; Agustín Ruiz 1', 33', 57'; Elmer Robles 2'; Eliodoro Portillo 15'; Darwin Ramírez 26'; Heber Ramos 26'	Report	Gael Geolier 34'

Puerto Vallarta Stadium, Puerto Vallarta
Referee: Gumercindo Batista (Panama)

== Knockout stage ==
=== Bracket ===
Quarter-finals
17 May – Puerto Vallarta
Mexico	5
Trinidad and Tobago	4
17 May – Puerto Vallarta
Panama	6
Guatemala	4
17 May – Puerto Vallarta
United States	5
Guadeloupe	1
17 May – Puerto Vallarta
El Salvador	8
Bahamas	4

Semi-finals
18 May – Puerto Vallarta
Mexico	3
Panama	0
18 May – Puerto Vallarta
United States	3 (5)
El Salvador	3 (4)

Final
19 May – Puerto Vallarta
Mexico	6
United States	2
Third place match
19 May – Puerto Vallarta
Panama	3
El Salvador	8

=== Quarter-finals ===
17 May 2019
14:15

El Salvador	8−4	Bahamas
Darwin Ramírez 2'; Agustín Ruiz 7', 32', 35'; Frank Velásquez 11'; Elmer Robles 19'; Rubén Batres 28', 30'	Report	Lesly St Fleur 12'; James Thompson 23'; Dwayne Forbes 32'; Kyle Williams 33'

Puerto Vallarta Stadium, Puerto Vallarta
Referee: Miguel López (Guatemala)

17 May 2019
15:30

United States	5−1	Guadeloupe
Nick Perera 5' (pen.), 23'; Tanner Akol 20', 35'; David Mondragón 22'	Report	Sylrick Phirmis 1'

Puerto Vallarta Stadium, Puerto Vallarta
Referee: David Cruz (El Salvador)

17 May 2019
16:45

Panama	6−4	Guatemala
Luis Quintero 5', 15'; Eliecer García 10', 33'; Rafael García 16'; Xavier García 21'	Report	Álex Morán 21' (pen.); Leandro Bachez 23', 32'; Luis Zaldaña 32'

Puerto Vallarta Stadium, Puerto Vallarta
Referee: Warner Porras (Costa Rica)

17 May 2019
18:00

Mexico	5−4	Trinidad and Tobago
Abdiel Villa 1', 30'; José Hernández 4'; José Vizcarra 31', 32'	Report	Shallun Bobb 12', 24'; Shane Hospedales 23'; Kevon Woodley 35'

Puerto Vallarta Stadium, Puerto Vallarta
Referee: Juan Andrés Ángeles (Dominican Republic)

=== Semi-finals ===
Winners qualify for 2019 FIFA Beach Soccer World Cup.

18 May 2019
16:45

United States	3–3 (a.e.t.)	El Salvador
Nick Perera 11'; Tomas Canale 29'; Adriano Dos Santos 33'	Report	Exon Perdomo 5', 23', 29'
Penalties
Nick Perera (penalty scored); Oscar Reyes (penalty scored); Christopher Toth (penalty scored); Tanner Akol (penalty scored); David Mondragón (penalty scored)	5–4	(penalty scored) Agustín Ruiz; (penalty scored) Exon Perdomo; (penalty scored) Rubén Batres; (penalty scored) Darwin Ramírez; (penalty missed) Elmer Robles

Puerto Vallarta Stadium, Puerto Vallarta
Referee: Juan Andrés Ángeles (Dominican Republic)

18 May 2019
18:00

Mexico	3–0	Panama
Ramón Maldonado 16'; Diego Villaseñor 17'; Alberto Kelly 30' (o.g.)	Report

Puerto Vallarta Stadium, Puerto Vallarta
Referee: Miguel López (Guatemala)

=== Third place match ===
19 May 2019
14:30

Panama	3–8	El Salvador
Rafael García 12'; Exon Perdomo 21' (o.g.); Eliecer García 23'	Report	Agustín Ruiz 2', 21'; Frank Velásquez 9', 15', 18'; Exon Perdomo 15' (pen.); Rubén Batres 19'; Heber Ramos 19'

Puerto Vallarta Stadium, Puerto Vallarta
Referee: Alexander Vetia (Cuba)

=== Final ===
19 May 2019
15:45

Mexico	6–2	United States
Benjamín Mosco 28'; José Hernández 29'; Ramón Maldonado 30', 32' (pen.); Jair Alemán 31', 34'	Report	Nick Perera 11', 33' (pen.)

Puerto Vallarta Stadium, Puerto Vallarta
Referee: Juan Andrés Ángeles (Dominican Republic)

== Awards ==
The following awards were given at the conclusion of the tournament:

Golden Ball (Most valuable player)
(Mexico) Benjamín Mosco
Golden Boot (Top scorer)
(United States) Nick Perera (13 goals)
Golden Glove (Best goalkeeper)
(Mexico) Diego Villaseñor
Best Young Player
(El Salvador) Exon Perdomo
Fair Play Award
Panama

== Top goalscorers ==
13 goals

- (United States) Nick Perera

11 goals

- (El Salvador) Agustín Ruiz
- (United States) Tanner Akol

9 goals

- (Panama) Rafael García

8 goals

- (El Salvador) Exon Perdomo
- (Panama) Alfonso Maquensi
- (Trinidad and Tobago) Kevon Woodley

7 goals

- (Panama) Eliecer García
- (Mexico) Ramón Maldonado

6 goals

- (El Salvador) Frank Velásquez
- (El Salvador) Rubén Batres

5 goals

- (Jamaica) Timothy Munnings

== Qualified teams for FIFA Beach Soccer World Cup ==
The following two teams from CONCACAF qualify for the 2019 FIFA Beach Soccer World Cup.

Team	Qualified on	Previous appearances in FIFA Beach Soccer World Cup^{1} only FIFA era (since 2005)
United States	18 May 2019	4 (2005, 2006, 2007, 2013)
Mexico	18 May 2019	5 (2007, 2008, 2011, 2015, 2017)

^{1} Bold indicates champions for that year. Italic indicates hosts for that year.
