= 2021 CONCACAF Beach Soccer Championship =

Beach soccer tournament

2021 FIFA Beach Soccer World Cup CONCACAF qualifier

Tournament details
- Host country: Costa Rica
- City: San Rafael de Alajuela
- Dates: 17–23 May
- Teams: 11 (from 1 confederation)
- Venue(s): 1 (in 1 host city)

Final positions
- Champions: El Salvador (2nd title)
- Runners-up: United States
- Third place: Guatemala
- Fourth place: Mexico

Tournament statistics
- Matches played: 23
- Goals scored: 211 (9.17 per match)
- Top scorer(s): (El Salvador) Frank Velásquez (11 goals)
- Best player(s): (El Salvador) Rubén Batres
- Best young player: (United States) Antonio Chávez
- Best goalkeeper: (El Salvador) Eliodoro Portillo
- Fair play award: Mexico

The 2021 CONCACAF Beach Soccer Championship was the ninth edition of the CONCACAF Beach Soccer Championship, the premier beach soccer tournament contested by North, Central American and Caribbean men's national teams and organised the governing body of football in North America, CONCACAF. The tournament took place at the Sports Complex Fedefutbol-Plycem in San Rafael District, Alajuela, Costa Rica between 17 and 23 May 2021, with 12 nations contesting the title.

Mexico were the defending champions, but lost in the third-place match. El Salvador dominated the tournament, scoring fifty goals in six matches, and won their second title after beating the United States in the final, while Guatemala defeated Mexico to finish third.

The championship also acted as the CONCACAF qualification tournament for the 2021 FIFA Beach Soccer World Cup. El Salvador and the United States, as the top two teams, qualified for the World Cup as the representatives from CONCACAF.

== Teams ==
A total of 12 teams entered the tournament.

Team	Appearance	Previous best performance
Bahamas	7th	Quarter-finals (2015, 2017, 2019)
Belize	4th	Round 1 (2015, 2017, 2019)
Costa Rica (hosts)	9th	Runners-up (2009, 2015)
Dominican Republic	1st	Debut
El Salvador	8th	Champions (2009)
Guadeloupe	4th	Fourth place (2017)
Guatemala	5th	Quarter-finals (2015, 2019)
Mexico (title holders)	9th	Champions (2008, 2011, 2015, 2019)
Panama	4th	Champions (2017)
Trinidad and Tobago	5th	Quarter-finals (2015, 2017, 2019)
Turks and Caicos Islands	4th	Round 1 (2015, 2017, 2019)
United States	9th	Champions (2006, 2013)

== Draw ==
The draw to split the 12 teams into three groups of four was held at 11:00 EST on 8 March 2021 at CONCACAF headquarters in Miami, United States.

The procedure was as follows:

The teams were first divided into four pots of three based on their CONCACAF Beach Soccer Ranking as of December 2019. The highest ranked teams were placed in Pot 1, down through to the lowest ranked teams placed in Pot 4. The three teams in Pot 1 were seeded and each automatically assigned to the head of one of the groups. The teams from Pots 2–4 were then drawn, drawing all teams from one pot before moving onto the next. From each pot, the first team drawn was placed into Group A, the second team drawn placed into Group B and the final team drawn placed into Group C.

Pot 1 (seeds)	Pot 2	Pot 3	Pot 4
Mexico (1) (assigned to A1); El Salvador (2) (assigned to B1); United States (3) (assigned to C1)	Panama (4); Costa Rica (5) (hosts); Bahamas (6)	Guadeloupe (7); Trinidad and Tobago (8); Guatemala (9)	Belize (13); Turks and Caicos Islands (16); Dominican Republic (n/a)

The numbers in parentheses show the CONCACAF ranking of the teams as of December 2019, out of 19 nations.

== Officials ==
The following 15 officials that will referee the tournament were revealed on 5 May.

- (Dominican Republic) Juan Angeles
- (Panama) Gumercindo Batista
- (Cuba) Erlis Bermudez
- (El Salvador) Gonzalo Carballo
- (El Salvador) David Cruz
- (Dominican Republic) Robert Gomez
- (Guatemala) Miguel Lopez
- (Mexico) Mario Nava
- (Cuba) Arian Perez
- (Costa Rica) Warner Porras
- (Cuba) Alexander Rafoso
- (El Salvador) Julio Ramos
- (Mexico) Jair Robles
- (Costa Rica) Luis Torres
- (Panama) Jorge Tunon

== Squads ==
Each team had to submit a squad of 12 players (including a minimum of two goalkeepers), from an initial provisional squad of 20 players (Regulations Articles 10.1; 10.2).

The final rosters were revealed on 11 May.

Players and staff were required to take regular COVID-19 tests during the competition, in respect to health and safety controls regarding the COVID-19 pandemic:

- On 17 May, one player and one member of staff from the Dominican Republic tested positive and were required to self-isolate. The match schedule was unaffected.
- On 18 May, one player from the United States tested positive and was required to self-isolate. The match schedule was unaffected.

== Group stage ==
Each team earns three points for a win in regulation time, two points for a win in extra time, one point for a win in a penalty shoot-out, and no points for a defeat. The top two teams from each group and the two best third placed teams advance to the quarter-finals.

Tiebreakers

The ranking of teams in each group is determined as follows (Regulations Article 12.5):

1. Points obtained in all group matches;
2. Points obtained in the matches played between the teams in question;
3. Goal difference in the matches played between the teams in question;
4. Number of goals scored in the matches played between the teams in question;
5. Goal difference in all group matches;
6. Fair play points in all group matches (only one deduction could be applied to a player in a single match):
  - Yellow card: −1 points;
  - Indirect red card (second yellow card): −3 points;
  - Direct red card: −4 points;
  - Yellow card and direct red card: −5 points;
7. Drawing of lots.

All times are local, CST (UTC−6).

=== Group A ===
Pos	Team	Pld	W	W+	WP	L	GF	GA	GD	Pts	Qualification
1	Mexico	2	2	0	0	0	11	6	+5	6	Knockout stage
2	Panama	2	1	0	0	1	11	6	+5	3	Knockout stage
3	Belize	2	0	0	0	2	4	14	−10	0	
4	Guadeloupe (Note: Guadeloupe's withdrawal was announced on 16 April. Concerns regarding the COVID-19 pandemic were cited.)	0	0	0	0	0	0	0	0	0	Withdrew

Source: CONCACAF
Notes:
17 May 2021

Panama	Cancelled	Guadeloupe

17 May 2021
10:00

Belize	3–6	Mexico
Meza 17'; Mariano 25', 30' (pen.)	Report	Sámano 10', 17'; Vizcarra 10'; Martínez 16' (pen.); Wbias 20'; Castillo 24'

Complejo Deportivo FEDEFUTBOL, San Rafael
Referee: Luis Torres (Costa Rica)

18 May 2021
10:00

Panama	8–1	Belize
Kelly 2', 34'; E. García 3'; Torres 8'; Maquensi 17'; Londoño 28'; Villarreal 31'; Carvajal 32'	Report	Meza 24'

Complejo Deportivo FEDEFUTBOL, San Rafael
Referee: Miguel Lopez (Guatemala)
18 May 2021

Mexico	Cancelled	Guadeloupe

19 May 2021

Guadeloupe	Cancelled	Belize

19 May 2021
10:00

Mexico	5–3	Panama
Castillo 1', 13'; Alemán 9', 20'; Rodriguez 14'	Report	E. García 3'; Escobar 20'; Maquensi 25'

Complejo Deportivo FEDEFUTBOL, San Rafael
Referee: Gonzalo Carballo (El Salvador)

=== Group B ===
Pos	Team	Pld	W	W+	WP	L	GF	GA	GD	Pts	Qualification
1	El Salvador	3	3	0	0	0	29	4	+25	9	Knockout stage
2	Guatemala	3	1	0	1	1	14	11	+3	4	Knockout stage
3	Bahamas	3	1	0	0	2	15	12	+3	3	Knockout stage
4	Dominican Republic	3	0	0	0	3	4	35	−31	0	

Source: CONCACAF
17 May 2021
11:30

Bahamas	3–3 (a.e.t.)	Guatemala
Williams 24'; Beneby 34'; Joseph 36'	Report	Flores 12'; W. González 22'; M. González 34'
Penalties
Julmis (penalty scored); Joseph (penalty missed)	1–3	(penalty scored) W. González; (penalty scored) Sáenz; (penalty scored) M. González

Complejo Deportivo FEDEFUTBOL, San Rafael
Referee: Mario Nava (Mexico)
17 May 2021
13:00

Dominican Republic	1–15	El Salvador
Navarro 29'	Report	Batres 3', 12', 30', 31' (pen.); Velásquez 4', 6', 28'; D. Ramírez 9'; Robles 11'; Cruz 13'; Urbina 15', 26', 28'; H. Ramos 22'; Perdomo 24'

Complejo Deportivo FEDEFUTBOL, San Rafael
Referee: Jair Robles (Mexico)

18 May 2021
11:30

Bahamas	10–2	Dominican Republic
Munnings 7' (pen.), 35'; St. Fleur 16', 25', 26', 29' (pen.), 31'; Williams 22'; Joseph 24' (pen.); Julmis 30'	Report	Beneby 4' (o.g.); Moreta 23'

Complejo Deportivo FEDEFUTBOL, San Rafael
Referee: Marco Navarro (Costa Rica)
18 May 2021
13:00

El Salvador	7–1	Guatemala
Perdomo 4'; Cruz 7'; Velásquez 8', 21'; H. Ramos 19'; Portillo 21'; Robles 22'	Report	Álvares 22'

Complejo Deportivo FEDEFUTBOL, San Rafael
Referee: Warner Porras (Costa Rica)

19 May 2021
11:30

Guatemala	10–1	Dominican Republic
Sáenz 5' (pen.); Crocker 12', 18'; Flores 13', 31'; M. González 14'; W. González 24'; Álvarez 29'; Bachez 33'; López 35'	Report	Navarro 33' (pen.)

Complejo Deportivo FEDEFUTBOL, San Rafael
Referee: Jair Robles (Mexico)
19 May 2021
13:00

El Salvador	7–2	Bahamas
Perdomo 9'; Batres 20', 24'; Portillo 26'; Velásquez 30', 34'; Urbina 32'	Report	St. Fleur 2', 25'

Complejo Deportivo FEDEFUTBOL, San Rafael
Referee: Gumercindo Batista (Panama)

=== Group C ===
Pos	Team	Pld	W	W+	WP	L	GF	GA	GD	Pts	Qualification
1	Costa Rica (H)	3	3	0	0	0	15	8	+7	9	Knockout stage
2	United States	3	2	0	0	1	20	8	+12	6	Knockout stage
3	Trinidad and Tobago	3	1	0	0	2	12	15	−3	3	Knockout stage
4	Turks and Caicos Islands	3	0	0	0	3	7	23	−16	0	

Source: CONCACAF
(H) Host
17 May 2021
14:30

Turks and Caicos Islands	1–11	United States
Brooks 16'	Report	Perea 4', 23'; Rezende 7'; Chavez 8'; Mondragón 9'; Perera 19', 22'; Canale 23', 23'; Silveira 30', 31'

Complejo Deportivo FEDEFUTBOL, San Rafael
Referee: Gumercindo Batista (Panama)
17 May 2021
16:00

Costa Rica	5–3	Trinidad and Tobago
Gamboa 11'; C. Sánchez 18', 32'; Pacheco 33'; Calvo 34'	Report	Augustine 25', 26'; McDougall 34'

Complejo Deportivo FEDEFUTBOL, Alajuela
Referee: Juan Angeles (Dominican Republic)

18 May 2021
14:30

United States	5–2	Trinidad and Tobago
Perera 2'; Toth 3'; Canale 11', 29'; Silveira 23'	Report	McDougall 25'; Gregory 29'

Complejo Deportivo FEDEFUTBOL, San Rafael
Referee: Gonzalo Carballo (El Salvador)
18 May 2021
16:00

Costa Rica	5–1	Turks and Caicos Islands
C. Sánchez 1', 2', 13'; Pacheco 13'; Sandi 19'	Report	Beljour 13'

Complejo Deportivo FEDEFUTBOL, San Rafael
Referee: Jorge Tunon (Panama)

19 May 2021
14:30

Trinidad and Tobago	7–5	Turks and Caicos Islands
Augustine 3'; Gray 4', 12'; Bobb 5', 21'; McDougall 24', 36'	Report	Bryan 16'; Jerome 17'; Magny 24', 29'; Beljour 34'

Complejo Deportivo FEDEFUTBOL, San Rafael
Referee: Mario Nava (Mexico)
19 May 2021
16:00

United States	4–5	Costa Rica
Santos 4'; Silveira 19'; Toth 24'; Albiston 36'	Report	Arrieta 12'; Pacheco 14', 28', 28'; Sánchez 34'

Complejo Deportivo FEDEFUTBOL, San Rafael
Referee: Juan Angeles (Dominican Republic)

=== Ranking of third-placed teams ===
Since Group A consisted of three teams, for the two third placed teams from Groups B and C, their results against the teams finishing in fourth place in their groups were discounted for this ranking.

Pos	Grp	Team	Pld	W	W+	WP	L	GF	GA	GD	Pts	Qualification
1	B	Bahamas (Note: Fair play points: Bahamas, –3; Trinidad and Tobago, –6.)	2	0	0	0	2	5	10	−5	0	Knockout stage
2	C	Trinidad and Tobago	2	0	0	0	2	5	10	−5	0	Knockout stage
3	A	Belize	2	0	0	0	2	4	14	−10	0	

Source: CONCACAF

== Knockout stage ==
20 May was allocated as a rest day.

Quarter-finals
21 May – San Rafael
Mexico (a.e.t.)	5
Bahamas	4
21 May – San Rafael
Panama	3
United States	4
21 May – San Rafael
El Salvador	9
Trinidad and Tobago	2
21 May – San Rafael
Costa Rica	4
Guatemala	6

Semi-finals
22 May – San Rafael
Mexico	2
United States	5
22 May – San Rafael
El Salvador	6
Guatemala	2

Final
23 May – San Rafael
United States	4
El Salvador	6
Third place match
23 May – San Rafael
Mexico	2
Guatemala	5

=== Quarter-finals ===
21 May 2021
11:30

Mexico	5–4 (a.e.t.)	Bahamas
Rodriguez 2', 37'; Macías 8'; Wbias 20'; Castillo 31'	Report	Julmis 1', 1'; Francois 7'; Munnings 19'

Complejo Deportivo FEDEFUTBOL, San Rafael
Referee: Gonzalo Carballo (El Salvador)
21 May 2021
13:00

Panama	3–4	United States
R. García 19'; Quintero 25'; Maquensi 27'	Report	Albiston 17' (pen.); Perea 21'; Silveira 26', 32'

Complejo Deportivo FEDEFUTBOL, San Rafael
Referee: Miguel Lopez (Guatemala)
21 May 2021
14:30

El Salvador	9–2	Trinidad and Tobago
Portillo 1'; Perdomo 3'; Batres 13', 25', 31' (pen.); Bailey 23' (o.g.); Velásquez 26', 34', 35'	Report	Woodley 5' (pen.); Baird 27'

Complejo Deportivo FEDEFUTBOL, San Rafael
Referee: Juan Angeles (Dominican Republic)
21 May 2021
16:00

Costa Rica	4–6	Guatemala
Pacheco 8'; Mora 16', 36'; C. Sánchez 28'	Report	C. González 9'; M. González 12'; Sáenz 16'; Crocker 18'; W. González 29', 35'

Complejo Deportivo FEDEFUTBOL, San Rafael
Referee: Jair Robles (Mexico)

=== Semi-finals ===
Winners qualify for the 2021 FIFA Beach Soccer World Cup.

22 May 2021
14:00

Mexico	2–5	United States
Castillo 19'; Santos 24' (o.g.)	Report	Mondragón 7'; Dilbert 23', 31'; Perera 24'; Canale 25'

Complejo Deportivo FEDEFUTBOL, San Rafael
Referee: Gonzalo Carballo (El Salvador)
22 May 2021
15:30

El Salvador	6–2	Guatemala
Sáenz 3' (o.g.); Perdomo 23'; Ramos 28'; Velásquez 34'; Robles 34'; Batres 36'	Report	C. González 17'; Álvarez 34'

Complejo Deportivo FEDEFUTBOL, San Rafael
Referee: Juan Angeles (Dominican Republic)

=== Third place match ===
23 May 2021
14:00

Mexico	2–5	Guatemala
Rodriguez 27'; Wbias 30'	Report	Flores 14'; Pérez 21'; Sáenz 26'; W. González 27', 33'

Complejo Deportivo FEDEFUTBOL, San Rafael
Referee: Jorge Tunon (Panama)

=== Final ===
23 May 2021
15:30

United States	4–6	El Salvador
Santos 11', 14'; Canale 22'; Silveira 24'	Report	Robles 3' (pen.); Perdomo 7', 15', 16', 24'; Urbina 9'

Complejo Deportivo FEDEFUTBOL, San Rafael
Referee: Miguel Lopez (Guatemala)

== Awards ==
=== Winners trophy ===
2021 CONCACAF Beach Soccer Championship
champions

El Salvador
Second title

=== Individual awards ===
The following awards were given at the conclusion of the tournament:

Golden Ball (Best player)
(El Salvador) Ruben Batres
Golden Boot (Top scorer)
(El Salvador) Frank Velásquez
11 goals
Golden Glove (Best goalkeeper)
(El Salvador) Eliodoro Portillo
Best Young Player
(United States) Antonio Chávez
Fair Play Award
Mexico

== Top goalscorers ==
Players with at least 5 goals are listed

11 goals

- (El Salvador) Frank Velásquez

10 goals

- (El Salvador) Rubén Batres

9 goals

- (El Salvador) Exon Perdomo

7 goals

- (Costa Rica) Christian Sánchez
- (United States) Gabriel Silveira
- (The Bahamas) Lesly St. Fleur

6 goals

- (Costa Rica) Greivin Pacheco
- (United States) Tomas Canale
- (Guatemala) Wilson González

5 goals

- (Mexico) Cristofher Castillo
- (El Salvador) Jason Urbina

Source: CONCACAF.com

== Final standings ==
Qualified for the 2021 FIFA Beach Soccer World Cup

Rank	Team
1st place, gold medalist(s)	El Salvador
2nd place, silver medalist(s)	United States
3rd place, bronze medalist(s)	Guatemala
4	Mexico
5–8	Bahamas
5–8	Costa Rica
5–8	Panama
5–8	Trinidad and Tobago
9–11	Belize
9–11	Dominican Republic
9–11	Turks and Caicos Islands

== Qualified teams for FIFA Beach Soccer World Cup ==
The following two teams from CONCACAF qualify for the 2021 FIFA Beach Soccer World Cup.

Team	Qualified on	Previous appearances in FIFA Beach Soccer World Cup^{1} only FIFA era (since 2005)
United States	22 May 2021	5 (2005, 2006, 2007, 2013, 2019)
El Salvador	22 May 2021	4 (2008, 2009, 2011, 2013)

^{1} Bold indicates champions for that year. Italic indicates hosts for that year.

== See also ==
- 2021 CONCACAF Futsal Championship
