= Panama national beach soccer team =

National sports team

Panama
- Nickname(s): Los Canaleros (The Canal Men); La Marea Roja (The Red Tide)
- Association: Federación Panameña de Fútbol
- Confederation: CONCACAF
- Sub-confederation: UNCAF (Central America)
- Head coach: Enrique Pérez Silva
- FIFA code: PAN
- BSWW ranking: 60 ▲1 (6 May 2026)

CONCACAF Beach Soccer Championship
- Appearances: 6 (first in 2015)
- Best result: Champions (2017)

The Panama national beach soccer team represents Panama in international beach soccer competitions and is controlled by the Federación Panameña de Fútbol, the governing body for football in Panama.

== Current squad ==
Note: Flags indicate national team as defined under FIFA eligibility rules; some limited exceptions apply. Players may hold more than one non-FIFA nationality.

No.	Pos.	Nation	Player
1	GK		Francisco Alejandro Portillo Bautista
2	DF		Gilberto Enrique Rangel
3	DF		Fernando Barrera Cano
4	FW		Alberto Agustín Beltrán Barrios
5	FW		Apolinar Gálvez
6	DF		Edgar Rivas Medina

No.	Pos.	Nation	Player
7	DF		Jorge Luis Pérez
8	DF		Alejandro Ruiz
9	DF		Luis Alberto Quintero Guevara
10	DF		Ricardo Antonio Torres
11	FW		Eliseo Blanco
12	GK		José López

== Achievements ==
=== CONCACAF Beach Soccer Championship ===
Year	Round	Pos	Pld	W	W aet/pso	L	GF	GA	GD
Puntarenas, Costa Rica. 2006	Did not enter								
Puerto Vallarta, Mexico. 2008	Did not enter								
Puerto Vallarta, Mexico. 2009	Did not enter								
Puerto Vallarta, Mexico. 2011	Did not enter								
Nassau, Bahamas. 2013	Did not enter								
Costa del Sol, El Salvador. 2015	Group Stage	13	3	1	0	2	17	13	+4
Nassau, Bahamas. 2017	Champions	1	6	3	2	1	25	17	+8
Puerto Vallarta, Mexico. 2019	Fourth place	4	6	4	0	2	29	20	+9
San Rafael de Alajuela, Costa Rica. 2021	Quarter Finals	5	3	1	0	2	14	10	+4
Nassau, Bahamas. 2023	Quarter Finals	5	4	1	0	3	13	11	+2
Nassau, Bahamas. 2025	Group Stage	5	3	1	1	1	8	10	–2
Total	1 Titles	6/11	25	11	3	11	106	81	+25
