= Lionel Cabral =

Belizean footballer (born 1994)

Lionel Cabral (born 13 January 1994) is currently a member of the Belize national beach soccer team; he also plays for the Paradise Freedom Fighters football team in the Premier League of Belize, the highest competitive football league in Belize. Cabral has also represented the Placencia Assassins FC in the premier league competition. In the 2015 CONCACAF Beach Soccer Championship, Cabral scored two goals for Belize.
