= Benjamín Mosco =

Mexican footballer (born 1985)

Benjamín Jesús Mosco Méndez (born 9 February 1985), known as Benjamín Mosco, is a former Mexican football player.

== Career ==
He played as a defender for Correcaminos UAT in the Liga de Ascenso. He started his career with the senior side of Pumas UNAM in 2006, but never appeared in a league match for the club.

He has played for the Mexico national beach football team at the 2011 FIFA Beach Soccer World Cup finals.
