= Rohan Reid =

Jamaican footballer (born 1981)

Personal information
- Date of birth: 3 November 1981 (age 45)
- Height: 1.93 m (6 ft 4 in)
- Position: Midfielder

Senior career*
Years	Team	Apps	(Gls)
2000–2002	Meadhaven United		
2002–2005	Village United		
2005–2006	Wadadah		
2006–2013	Arnett Gardens		
2013	Cavalier		
2013	Charlotte Eagles	9	(0)
2013–2018	Tivoli Gardens		

International career
2012–2014	Jamaica	7	(0)
- * Club domestic league appearances and goals

Rohan Reid (born 3 November 1981) is a Jamaican former international footballer who played as a midfielder.

== Club career ==
Reid has played club football in for Meadhaven United, Village United, Wadadah, Arnett Gardens, Cavalier, the Charlotte Eagles, and Tivoli Gardens.

Reid signed a one-year contract with USL Pro club Charlotte Eagles in March 2013.

== International career ==
Reid received his first call-up to the Jamaican national side in 2007. He made his international debut in 2012. He has also played for the Jamaica national beach soccer team.
