= 2017 CONCACAF Beach Soccer Championship =

2017 FIFA Beach Soccer World Cup Qualification (CONCACAF)

Tournament details
- Host country: Bahamas
- City: Nassau
- Dates: 20–26 February
- Teams: 16 (from 1 confederation)
- Venue: 1 (in 1 host city)

Final positions
- Champions: Panama (1st title)
- Runners-up: Mexico
- Third place: El Salvador
- Fourth place: Guadeloupe

Tournament statistics
- Matches played: 48
- Goals scored: 381 (7.94 per match)
- Top scorer(s): (Mexico) Ramón Maldonado (Belize) Marlon Meza (12 goals each)
- Best player: (Panama) Alfonso Maquensi
- Best young player: (Guyana) Jamal Haynes
- Best goalkeeper: (Mexico) Diego Villaseñor
- Fair play award: Canada

The 2017 CONCACAF Beach Soccer Championship was a beach soccer tournament which took place in Nassau from 20 to 26 February 2017. This was the second time that the CONCACAF Beach Soccer Championship was held in the Bahamas. All matches were played at the Malcolm Beach Soccer Facility.

The tournament aimed to crown the best beach soccer nation on the continent and also served as the FIFA Beach Soccer World Cup qualifier for teams from North, Central America and Caribbean which are members of CONCACAF, where the top two teams qualified for the 2017 FIFA Beach Soccer World Cup also to be held in the Bahamas.

In a shock turn of events, the considerably inexperienced Panama thwarted all four of the nations who have dominated the tournament historically to surprisingly claim their first title. Panama's group stage victory all but condemned 2015 runners up Costa Rica to their earliest ever exit, their defeat of two-time winners, the United States, in the quarter-finals also ensured the Americans' most premature departure. They then defeated former World Cup semi-finalists El Salvador in the semi-finals and three time and defending champions Mexico in the final.

As the finalists, Panama and Mexico qualified for the World Cup, the former for the first time (and the first new North American World Cup debutants since 2009), the latter for the fifth time.

This was a groundbreaking CONCACAF Beach Soccer Championship; it marked only the second time in the seven championships to date (other than in 2006) that the quartet of Costa Rica, El Salvador, the United States and Mexico did not all finish together in some combination in first through fourth place.

== Participating teams and draw ==
The following 16 teams entered the tournament.

North American Zone

- Canada
- Mexico
- United States

Central American Zone

- Belize
- Costa Rica
- El Salvador
- Panama

Caribbean Zone

- Antigua and Barbuda
- Bahamas (hosts)
- Barbados (replaced Guatemala of Central American Zone)
- Guadeloupe
- Guyana
- Jamaica
- Trinidad and Tobago
- Turks and Caicos Islands
- U.S. Virgin Islands

Notes

- Bahamas has already qualified for the FIFA Beach Soccer World Cup as hosts.
- Guadeloupe is not a FIFA member and thus ineligible to qualify for the FIFA Beach Soccer World Cup.
- Should Bahamas and/or Guadeloupe advance to the final, the next eligible highest-placed team would qualify for the FIFA Beach Soccer World Cup.
- On 28 October 2016, FIFA suspended the National Football Federation of Guatemala for political interference by the Government of Guatemala. Until the suspension is lifted, Guatemalan teams are not permitted to participate in international competitions. CONCACAF had set the deadline of 16 December 2016 for the suspension to be lifted, otherwise by rule, Guatemala would be disqualified from the 2017 CONCACAF Beach Soccer Championship, and any replacement team or revision to the tournament format would be discussed once the deadline had passed. On 23 December, CONCACAF announced that Barbados would take the place of Guatemala.

The draw of the tournament was held on 17 October 2016, 10:00 UTC−4, at the Intercontinental Hotel in Doral, Florida. The 16 teams were drawn into four groups of four teams, with the following seeding based on the BSWW Beach Soccer rankings:

Pot 1	Pot 2	Pot 3	Pot 4
Bahamas (hosts; assigned to A1); Mexico (title holders; assigned to B1); El Salvador; United States	Costa Rica; Guatemala; Trinidad and Tobago; Jamaica	Canada; Panama; Antigua and Barbuda; Belize	Guadeloupe; Turks and Caicos Islands; U.S. Virgin Islands; Guyana

Notes

- The draw started by selecting from a separate pot, which contained the five teams (Antigua and Barbuda, Belize, Guadeloupe, Turks and Caicos Islands, U.S. Virgin Islands) with the same exact ranking (38). These teams were drawn and placed into Pots 3 and 4 respectively to complete the distribution of the teams into those Pots.
- Guatemala were initially part of the draw, but were replaced by Barbados afterwards.

== Group stage ==
Each team earns three points for a win in regulation time, two points for a win in extra time, one point for a win in a penalty shoot-out, and no points for a defeat. The top two teams from each group advance to the quarter-finals, while the bottom two teams from each group enter the placement stage for 9th to 16th place.

All times are local, EST (UTC−5).

=== Group A ===
Pos	Team	Pld	W	W+	WP	L	GF	GA	GD	Pts	Qualification
1	Bahamas (H)	3	3	0	0	0	10	3	+7	9	Knockout stage
2	Jamaica	3	1	0	0	2	13	11	+2	3	Knockout stage
3	Guyana	3	1	0	0	2	8	11	−3	3	Placement stage (9th–16th place)
4	Belize	3	0	0	1	2	6	12	−6	1	Placement stage (9th–16th place)

Source: CONCACAF
Rules for classification: 1) Points; 2) Head-to-head points; 3) Head-to-head goal difference; 4) Head-to-head goals scored; 5) Total goal difference; 6) Total goals scored; 7) Number of red cards; 8) Number of yellow cards; 9) Drawing of lots (Regulations XVIII A.8).
(H) Host
20 February 2017
18:45

Jamaica	5–5 (a.e.t.)	Belize
Benjamin 10', 20' (pen.), 23'; R. Reid 21'; Waul 32'	Report	3', 5', 9' (pen.) Meza; 7', 32' Ramos
Penalties
Peddie (penalty missed); A. Reid (penalty missed)	0–2	(penalty scored) Meza; (penalty scored) Jones

Malcolm Beach Soccer Facility, Nassau
20 February 2017
20:00

Bahamas	4–1	Guyana
St. Fleur 4', 6' (pen.), 26'; Williams 32'	Report	30' Joseph

Malcolm Beach Soccer Facility, Nassau

21 February 2017
18:45

Guyana	3–6	Jamaica
Moore 10'; Joseph 19', 31'	Report	3', 5', 14' (pen.) R. Reid; 19' Waul; 23', 31' Anderson

Malcolm Beach Soccer Facility, Nassau
21 February 2017
20:00

Belize	0–3	Bahamas
	Report	17', 31' St. Fleur; 29' Joseph

Malcolm Beach Soccer Facility, Nassau

22 February 2017
17:30

Belize	1–4	Guyana
Haynes 5' (o.g.)	Report	4', 29' Joseph; 24' Moore; 25' Haynes

Malcolm Beach Soccer Facility, Nassau
22 February 2017
20:00

Bahamas	3–2	Jamaica
St. Fleur 5', 22', 34'	Report	13' R. Reid; 22' Benjamin

Malcolm Beach Soccer Facility, Nassau

=== Group B ===
Pos	Team	Pld	W	W+	WP	L	GF	GA	GD	Pts	Qualification
1	Mexico	3	3	0	0	0	27	5	+22	9	Knockout stage
2	Guadeloupe	3	2	0	0	1	11	16	−5	6	Knockout stage
3	Canada	3	1	0	0	2	12	16	−4	3	Placement stage (9th–16th place)
4	Barbados	3	0	0	0	3	8	21	−13	0	Placement stage (9th–16th place)

Source: CONCACAF
Rules for classification: 1) Points; 2) Head-to-head points; 3) Head-to-head goal difference; 4) Head-to-head goals scored; 5) Total goal difference; 6) Total goals scored; 7) Number of red cards; 8) Number of yellow cards; 9) Drawing of lots (Regulations XVIII A.8).
20 February 2017
13:45

Barbados	4–6	Canada
J. Grazette 4'; Chandler 5'; Pinder 21'; T. Grazette 25'	Report	1', 11' (pen.), 17', 28' Jankovic; 15' Pessoa; 27' Leconte

Malcolm Beach Soccer Facility, Nassau
20 February 2017
16:15

Mexico	9–2	Guadeloupe
Maldonado 10', 15', 36'; Villa 15'; D. Rodriguez 16'; Aleman 17', 25' (pen.); Mosco 27'; Saldivar 32'	Report	8' Hell; 10' Breter

Malcolm Beach Soccer Facility, Nassau

21 February 2017
13:45

Guadeloupe	5–4	Barbados
Hell 9', 15', 16', 33', 36'	Report	2' Chandler; 3' J. Grazette; 14' Beckles; 30' Pinder

Malcolm Beach Soccer Facility, Nassau
21 February 2017
17:30

Canada	3–8	Mexico
Bennett 7'; Chamale 26'; Scepanovic 31'	Report	11', 16', 25' Mosco; 17', 20' Maldonado; 27', 31', 35' Saldivar

Malcolm Beach Soccer Facility, Nassau

23 February 2017
13:45

Canada	3–4	Guadeloupe
Bennett 3'; Belguendouz 14', 25'	Report	2' Granchi; 11' (pen.) Hell; 29' Phirmis; 30' Gelas

Malcolm Beach Soccer Facility, Nassau
23 February 2017
16:15

Mexico	10–0	Barbados
A. Rodriguez 8', 13', 36'; Villa 10'; D. Rodriguez 20', 34'; Saldivar 24', 33'; Maldonado 26'; Sanchez 28'	Report

Malcolm Beach Soccer Facility, Nassau

=== Group C ===
Pos	Team	Pld	W	W+	WP	L	GF	GA	GD	Pts	Qualification
1	United States	3	3	0	0	0	20	4	+16	9	Knockout stage
2	Trinidad and Tobago	3	2	0	0	1	14	7	+7	6	Knockout stage
3	Antigua and Barbuda	3	1	0	0	2	9	18	−9	3	Placement stage (9th–16th place)
4	U.S. Virgin Islands	3	0	0	0	3	5	19	−14	0	Placement stage (9th–16th place)

Source: CONCACAF
Rules for classification: 1) Points; 2) Head-to-head points; 3) Head-to-head goal difference; 4) Head-to-head goals scored; 5) Total goal difference; 6) Total goals scored; 7) Number of red cards; 8) Number of yellow cards; 9) Drawing of lots (Regulations XVIII A.8).
20 February 2017
15:00

United States	8–1	U.S. Virgin Islands
Perera 15' (pen.), 21', 35'; Feld 17'; Canale 19', 35'; Santos 27'; Van Zytveld 30'	Report	7' Charles

Malcolm Beach Soccer Facility, Nassau
20 February 2017
17:30

Trinidad and Tobago	8–1	Antigua and Barbuda
Woodley 2', 19', 35'; Appoo 9'; McDougall 10', 13', 14', 33'	Report	8' Daniel

Malcolm Beach Soccer Facility, Nassau

22 February 2017
13:45

U.S. Virgin Islands	1–5	Trinidad and Tobago
Vollmer 10'	Report	5', 19', 22' King; 32' Appoo; 34' Woodley

Malcolm Beach Soccer Facility, Nassau
22 February 2017
15:00

Antigua and Barbuda	2–7	United States
Daniel 2'; Hughes 31'	Report	3', 36' Valentine; 5' Futagaki; 8' Van Zytveld; 9' (o.g.) Thomas; 25' Feld; 30' (pen.) Canale

Malcolm Beach Soccer Facility, Nassau

23 February 2017
15:00

Antigua and Barbuda	6–3	U.S. Virgin Islands
Richards 7', 15', 17'; Hughes 13' (pen.); Carr 19'; Murray 24'	Report	26', 32' Juma; 28' George

Malcolm Beach Soccer Facility, Nassau
23 February 2017
20:00

United States	5–1	Trinidad and Tobago
Garcia 12', 24'; Canale 29' (pen.), 36'; Reyes 32'	Report	33' Woodley

Malcolm Beach Soccer Facility, Nassau

=== Group D ===
Pos	Team	Pld	W	W+	WP	L	GF	GA	GD	Pts	Qualification
1	El Salvador	3	2	0	1	0	21	8	+13	7	Knockout stage
2	Panama	3	1	0	1	1	13	9	+4	4	Knockout stage
3	Costa Rica	3	1	0	0	2	11	11	0	3	Placement stage (9th–16th place)
4	Turks and Caicos Islands	3	0	0	0	3	8	25	−17	0	Placement stage (9th–16th place)

Source: CONCACAF
Rules for classification: 1) Points; 2) Head-to-head points; 3) Head-to-head goal difference; 4) Head-to-head goals scored; 5) Total goal difference; 6) Total goals scored; 7) Number of red cards; 8) Number of yellow cards; 9) Drawing of lots (Regulations XVIII A.8).
21 February 2017
15:00

Costa Rica	1–1 (a.e.t.)	Panama
Kastner 5'	Report	8' Rangel
Penalties
Pacheco (penalty missed); Mora (penalty scored); Cruz (penalty missed)	1–2	(penalty scored) Garcia; (penalty scored) Bultron; (penalty missed) Obregón

Malcolm Beach Soccer Facility, Nassau
21 February 2017
16:15

El Salvador	9–2	Turks and Caicos Islands
Ramos 4', 28'; Ruiz 5'; Membreño 23'; Batres 23', 24', 34'; Portillo 23'; Ramírez 27'	Report	21' Cadet; 30' Forbes

Malcolm Beach Soccer Facility, Nassau

22 February 2017
16:15

Panama	4–4 (a.e.t.)	El Salvador
Watson 11'; Maquensi 22', 24', 34'	Report	8' (pen.), 17' Batres; 22' (pen.) Ruiz; 31' Ramírez
Penalties
Garcia (penalty missed); Baltron (penalty scored); Maquensi (penalty missed)	1–2	(penalty scored) Batres; (penalty missed) Ramírez; (penalty scored) Ruiz

Malcolm Beach Soccer Facility, Nassau
22 February 2017
18:45

Turks and Caicos Islands	2–8	Costa Rica
Magny 23'; Cadet 32'	Report	7', 16', 21' Johnson; 12' Fallas; 22', 22' Pacheco; 23' Angulo; 26' Adanis

Malcolm Beach Soccer Facility, Nassau

23 February 2017
17:30

El Salvador	8–2	Costa Rica
Ramírez 16'; Segovia 17', 30', 34'; Ruiz 26'; Batres 27'; Robles 33', 35'	Report	3', 30' (pen.) Pacheco

Malcolm Beach Soccer Facility, Nassau
23 February 2017
18:45

Panama	8–4	Turks and Caicos Islands
Rangel 4'; Watson 9'; Obregon 11'; Maquensi 24', 27'; Garcia 25', 28'; Galvez 33'	Report	1', 2' Forbes; 14' Beljour; 21' Cadet

Malcolm Beach Soccer Facility, Nassau

== Placement stage (9th–16th place) ==
=== Bracket (9th–12th place) ===
9th place first round
24 February
Guyana	6
Antigua and Barbuda	4
24 February
Canada	2 (2)
Costa Rica (p)	2 (3)

9th place second round
25 February
Guyana	2
Costa Rica	5
25 February
Antigua and Barbuda	2
Canada	6

9th place
26 February
Costa Rica (a.e.t.)	6
Canada	5
11th place
26 February
Guyana	6
Antigua and Barbuda	8

=== Bracket (13th–16th place) ===
13th place first round
24 February
Belize (a.e.t.)	6
U.S. Virgin Islands	4
24 February
Barbados	5
Turks and Caicos	2

13th place second round
25 February
Belize	6
Barbados	2
25 February
U.S. Virgin Islands	1
Turks and Caicos	4

13th place
26 February
Belize	9
Turks and Caicos	4
15th place
26 February
Barbados	3
U.S. Virgin Islands	1

=== 13th place first round ===
24 February 2017
12:30

Barbados	5–2	Turks and Caicos Islands
Chandler 3', 31'; Gil 16' (pen.); Pinder 25'; J. Grazette 32'	Report	3', 20' (pen.) Forbes

Malcolm Beach Soccer Facility, Nassau
24 February 2017
13:45

Belize	6–4 (a.e.t.)	U.S. Virgin Islands
James 15'; Nunez 16'; Meza 27', 37'; Jones 32'; Mas 38'	Report	3', 19' Aranes; 15' Smith; 35' Vollmer

Malcolm Beach Soccer Facility, Nassau

=== 9th place first round ===
24 February 2017
15:00

Canada	2–2 (a.e.t.)	Costa Rica
Scepanovic 21'; Bennett 29'	Report	13' Fallas; 35' Pacheco
Penalties
Scepanovic (penalty scored); Belguendouz (penalty scored); Jankovic (penalty missed)	2–3	(penalty scored) Pacheco; (penalty scored) Mora; (penalty scored) Johnson

Malcolm Beach Soccer Facility, Nassau
24 February 2017
16:15

Guyana	6–4	Antigua and Barbuda
Wilson 1', 26'; Haynes 18', 19', 35'; Moore 18'	Report	13' Hughes; 19', 22' Daniel; 21' Thomas

Malcolm Beach Soccer Facility, Nassau

=== 13th place second round ===
25 February 2017
11:15

U.S. Virgin Islands	1–4	Turks and Caicos Islands
Schultz 15'	Report	4', 28' Magny; 4' Forbes; 24' Rene

Malcolm Beach Soccer Facility, Nassau
25 February 2017
12:30

Belize	6–2	Barbados
Figueroa 10' (pen.); Meza 13' (pen.), 26', 31'; James 21', 27'	Report	3' Best; 4' J. Grazette

Malcolm Beach Soccer Facility, Nassau

=== 9th place second round ===
25 February 2017
13:45

Antigua and Barbuda	2–6	Canada
She. Warner 19'; Sha. Warner 36'	Report	8' Scepanovic; 9' Belguendouz; 26', 27' Pessoa; 28' Orellana; 32' Leconte

Malcolm Beach Soccer Facility, Nassau
25 February 2017
15:00

Guyana	2–5	Costa Rica
Moore 27'; Simon 33'	Report	4' Fallas; 15' Villegas; 19' (pen.) Kastner; 29' Leon; 30' Angulo

Malcolm Beach Soccer Facility, Nassau

=== 15th place match ===
26 February 2017
11:15

Barbados	3–1	U.S. Virgin Islands
Pinder 18' (pen.); Griffith 20'; Manning 32'	Report	4' Schultz

Malcolm Beach Soccer Facility, Nassau

=== 13th place match ===
26 February 2017
12:30

Belize	9–4	Turks and Caicos Islands
James 2', 34'; Jones 5', 32'; Meza 6', 12', 14', 17'; Ramos 20'	Report	11', 31' (pen.) Magny; 14' Cadet; 32' Forbes

Malcolm Beach Soccer Facility, Nassau

=== 11th place match ===
26 February 2017
13:45

Guyana	6–8	Antigua and Barbuda
Wilson 13', 34'; Joseph 21', 27'; Haynes 22', 27'	Report	1', 33' Richards; 10', 15', 21' Thomas; 14', 31', 36' Daniel

Malcolm Beach Soccer Facility, Nassau

=== 9th place match ===
26 February 2017
15:00

Costa Rica	6–5 (a.e.t.)	Canada
Leon 1'; Pacheco 21', 37'; Fallas 6'; Johnson 20', 31'	Report	5' Scepanovic; 22', 32' Jankovic; 26' Orellana; 26' Pessoa

Malcolm Beach Soccer Facility, Nassau

== Knockout stage ==
The quarter-final matchups were decided by a draw, with the group winners matched up with the group runners-up.

=== Bracket (1st–4th place) ===
Quarter-finals
24 February
United States	4
Panama	6
24 February
El Salvador	5
Jamaica	0
24 February
Bahamas	3
Guadeloupe	5
24 February
Mexico	5
Trinidad and Tobago	1

Semi-finals
25 February
Panama (p)	2 (2)
El Salvador	2 (1)
25 February
Guadeloupe	0
Mexico	3

Final
26 February
Panama	4
Mexico	2
3rd place
26 February
El Salvador	7
Guadeloupe	2

=== Bracket (5th–8th place) ===
5th semi-finals
25 February
United States	6
Jamaica	2
25 February
Bahamas	5
Trinidad and Tobago	2

5th place
26 February
United States	4
Bahamas	2
7th place
26 February
Jamaica	3
Trinidad and Tobago	9

=== Quarter-finals ===
24 February 2017
17:30

El Salvador	5–0	Jamaica
Ruiz 14', 25', 27'; Segovia 26', 35'	Report

Malcolm Beach Soccer Facility, Nassau
24 February 2017
18:45

United States	4–6	Panama
Feld 8'; Santos 14'; Toth 21', 36'	Report	12', 16' Garcia; 14', 23' Galvez; 32' Obregon; 34' Watson

Malcolm Beach Soccer Facility, Nassau
24 February 2017
20:00

Mexico	5–1	Trinidad and Tobago
Maldonado 2', 33'; Saldivar 10'; A. Rodriguez 25'; D. Rodriguez 34'	Report	24' Augustine

Malcolm Beach Soccer Facility, Nassau
24 February 2017
21:15

Bahamas	3–5	Guadeloupe
Forbes 5'; Joseph 13'; St. Fleur 20'	Report	4' Granchi; 6', 31', 33' Gelas; 16' Hell

Malcolm Beach Soccer Facility, Nassau

=== 5th place semi-finals ===
25 February 2017
16:15

United States	6–2	Jamaica
Feld 5'; Reyes 17'; Canale 20' (pen.), 26', 36'; Van Zytveld 24'	Report	12' Planter; 14' Benjamin

Malcolm Beach Soccer Facility, Nassau
25 February 2017
17:30

Bahamas	5–2	Trinidad and Tobago
Joseph 19', 36' (pen.); Christie 20', 29'; St. Fleur 31'	Report	33' Bailey; 35' (pen.) Lyons

Malcolm Beach Soccer Facility, Nassau

=== Semi-finals ===
The winners qualified for the 2017 FIFA Beach Soccer World Cup.

25 February 2017
18:45

Panama	2–2 (a.e.t.)	El Salvador
Gálvez 19'; Rangel 32'	Report	13' Ramos; 35' Ruiz
Penalties
Watson (penalty scored); R. García (penalty scored)	2–1	(penalty missed) Batres; (penalty scored) Robles; (penalty missed) Ramos

Malcolm Beach Soccer Facility, Nassau
25 February 2017
20:00

Guadeloupe	0–3	Mexico
	Report	1', 24' Maldonado; 10' D. Rodríguez

Malcolm Beach Soccer Facility, Nassau

=== 7th place match ===
26 February 2017
16:15

Jamaica	3–9	Trinidad and Tobago
R. Reid 16', 21', 22'	Report	8', 29' Hislop; 17', 22' Appoo; 19' Bobb; 21', 34' Woodley; 31' Augustine; 35' Charles

Malcolm Beach Soccer Facility, Nassau

=== 5th place match ===
26 February 2017
18:45

United States	4–2	Bahamas
Reyes 4'; Canale 9'; Perera 26'; Toth 32'	Report	24' (pen.) St. Fleur; 26' Christie

Malcolm Beach Soccer Facility, Nassau

=== 3rd place match ===
26 February 2017
17:30

El Salvador	7–2	Guadeloupe
Robles 7'; Ruiz 11' (pen.); Segovia 18'; Batres 26', 27'; Ramírez 34'; Rizo 36'	Report	1' Phirmis; 7' Gelas

Malcolm Beach Soccer Facility, Nassau

=== Final ===
26 February 2017
20:00

Panama	4–2	Mexico
Arrocha 20', 22'; Maquensi 27'; Saldívar 34' (o.g.)	Report	10', 23' Maldonado

Malcolm Beach Soccer Facility, Nassau

== Awards ==
=== Winners ===
2017 CONCACAF Beach Soccer
Championship champions

Panama
First title

=== Individual awards ===
The following awards were given at the conclusion of the tournament.

Golden Ball (Most valuable player)
(Panama) Alfonso Maquensi
Golden Boot (Top scorer)
(Mexico) Ramón Maldonado	(Belize) Marlon Meza
12 goals
Golden Glove (Best goalkeeper)
(Mexico) Diego Villaseñor
Best Young Player
(Guyana) Jamal Haynes
Fair Play Award
Canada

== Top goalscorers ==
12 goals

- (Mexico) Ramón Maldonado
- (Belize) Marlon Meza

11 goals

- (The Bahamas) Lesly St. Fleur

9 goals

- (United States) Alessandro Canale

8 goals

- (El Salvador) Jose Ruiz
- (El Salvador) Ruben Batres
- (Jamaica) Rohan Reid
- (Guadeloupe) Sebastien Hell

7 goals

- (Turks and Caicos Islands) Billy Forbes
- (Mexico) César Saldivar
- (Antigua and Barbuda) Omarie Daniel
- (Costa Rica) Greivin Pacheco
- (Trinidad and Tobago) Kevon Woodley
- (Guyana) Deshawn Joseph

6 goals

- (Canada) Marc Jankovic
- (Panama) Alfonso Maquensi
- (Jamaica) Jamal Haynes
- (El Salvador) Melvin Segovia

Source: CONCACAF.com (Note: Stats given here are different from CONCACAF.com due to discrepancies in goalscorers.)

== Final ranking ==
Qualified for the 2017 FIFA Beach Soccer World Cup
† Qualified for the World Cup as hosts

Rank	Team
1st place, gold medalist(s)	Panama
2nd place, silver medalist(s)	Mexico
3rd place, bronze medalist(s)	El Salvador
4	Guadeloupe
5	United States
6	Bahamas^{†}
7	Trinidad and Tobago
8	Jamaica
9	Costa Rica
10	Canada
11	Antigua and Barbuda
12	Guyana
13	Belize
14	Turks and Caicos Islands
15	Barbados
16	U.S. Virgin Islands

=== Qualified teams for FIFA Beach Soccer World Cup ===
The following three teams from CONCACAF qualified for the 2017 FIFA Beach Soccer World Cup, including Bahamas which qualified as hosts.

Team	Qualified on	Previous appearances in tournament^{1} only FIFA-sanctioned era (since 2005)
Bahamas	19 December 2014	0 (debut)
Panama	25 February 2017	0 (debut)
Mexico	25 February 2017	4 (2007, 2008, 2011, 2015)

^{1} Bold indicates champion for that year. Italic indicates host for that year.
