= 2015 CONCACAF Beach Soccer Championship =

2015 FIFA Beach Soccer World Cup Qualification (CONCACAF)

Tournament details
- Host country: El Salvador
- City: Costa del Sol
- Dates: 28 March – 4 April
- Teams: 16 (from 1 confederation)
- Venue: 1 (in 1 host city)

Final positions
- Champions: Mexico (3rd title)
- Runners-up: Costa Rica
- Third place: El Salvador
- Fourth place: United States

Tournament statistics
- Matches played: 36
- Goals scored: 335 (9.31 per match)
- Top scorer(s): (El Salvador) Francisco Velásquez (15 goals)
- Best player: (Mexico) Ramón Maldonado
- Best goalkeeper: (Mexico) Miguel Estrada

The 2015 CONCACAF Beach Soccer Championship was a beach soccer tournament which took place in Costa del Sol, El Salvador on 28 March – 4 April 2015. This was the first time the CONCACAF Beach Soccer Championship was held in Central America. All matches were played at Estadio de Fútbol Playa (Costa del Sol) in La Paz Department, with an official capacity of 2,000.

The tournament served as the FIFA Beach Soccer World Cup qualifier for teams from North, Central America and Caribbean which are members of CONCACAF, where the top two teams qualified for the 2015 FIFA Beach Soccer World Cup in Portugal. In the final, Mexico defeated Costa Rica to be crowned champions, and both teams qualified for the 2015 FIFA Beach Soccer World Cup.

== Participating teams and draw ==
The following 16 teams entered the tournament.

North American Zone

- Mexico
- United States

Central American Zone

- Belize
- Costa Rica
- El Salvador (hosts)
- Guatemala
- Panama

Caribbean Zone

- Antigua and Barbuda
- Bahamas
- Barbados
- Guadeloupe
- Jamaica
- Puerto Rico
- Trinidad and Tobago
- Turks and Caicos Islands
- U.S. Virgin Islands

Note: Guadeloupe is not a FIFA member and thus ineligible to qualify for the FIFA Beach Soccer World Cup.

The draw of the tournament was held on 27 January 2015, 10:00 local time (UTC−6), at San Salvador. The 16 teams were drawn into four groups of four teams, with the following seeding:

Pot 1	Pot 2	Pot 3	Pot 4 (3 teams were drawn to Pot 3)
El Salvador (assigned to A1); Mexico (assigned to B1); United States (assigned to C1); Costa Rica (assigned to D1)	Guatemala; Bahamas; Jamaica; Trinidad and Tobago	Puerto Rico	Antigua and Barbuda; Barbados; Belize; Guadeloupe; Panama; Turks and Caicos Islands; U.S. Virgin Islands

== Group stage ==
Each team earns three points for a win in regulation time, two points for a win in extra time, one point for a win in a penalty shoot-out, and no points for a defeat.

Legend
The top two teams from each group advance to the quarter-finals.

All times are local, Central Standard Time (UTC−6).

=== Group A ===
Pos	Team	Pld	W	WE	WP	L	GF	GA	GD	Pts	Qualification
1	El Salvador (H)	3	3	0	0	0	31	6	+25	9	Knockout stage
2	Jamaica	3	2	0	0	1	19	15	+4	6	Knockout stage
3	Belize	3	1	0	0	2	13	26	−13	3	
4	Puerto Rico	3	0	0	0	3	4	20	−16	0	

Source: CONCACAF
(H) Host
28 March 2015
16:30

Jamaica	7–3	Puerto Rico
Rohan Reid 2', 7', 21', 32'; Daemion Benjamin 19'; André Reid 24'; Gregory Simpson 28'	Report 1 Report 2	Carlos Astondoa 6'; Dorian González 9'; Nelson Encarnación 31'

Estadio de Fútbol Playa, Costa del Sol
Referee: Juan Angels
28 March 2015
20:15

Belize	2–17	El Salvador
Lionel Cabral 12'; Shawn Vásquez 17'	Report 1 Report 2	Abraham Henríquez 1', 2'; Elmer Robles 11', 20'; Heber Ramos 12', 35'; José Ruiz 12', 18'; F. Velásquez 13', 15', 16', 22', 23', 31'; Rubén Batres 21'; Hérbert Ramos 29'; José Membreño 35'

Estadio de Fútbol Playa, Costa del Sol

29 March 2015
17:45

El Salvador	7–0	Puerto Rico
Hérbert Ramos 1'; F. Velásquez 6', 11', 18', 36'; Abraham Henríquez 14', 32'	Report 1 Report 2

Estadio de Fútbol Playa, Costa del Sol
29 March 2015
19:00

Jamaica	8–5	Belize
Philip Venroy Peddie 6', 8'; Rohan Reid 15', 29'; Daemion Benjamin 19'; André Reid 22', 27'; Gregory Simpson 34'	Report 1 Report 2	Franz Nuñez 1'; Jeremy James 6', 10', 14'; John King 22'

Estadio de Fútbol Playa, Costa del Sol

30 March 2015
16:30

Puerto Rico	1–6	Belize
Xavier Sancho 17'	Report 1 Report 2	Franz Nuñez 4', 4'; Dennis Serano 7'; Elton Gordon 27'; John King 30'; Lionel Cabral 36'

Estadio de Fútbol Playa, Costa del Sol
30 March 2015
20:15

El Salvador	7–4	Jamaica
José Ruiz 14', 19', 30'; Abraham Henríquez 17'; F. Velásquez 28'; Rubén Batres 31', 32'	Report 1 Report 2	Jermaine Anderson 2', 8'; Derrick Planter 6'; Daemion Benjamin 9'

Estadio de Fútbol Playa, Costa del Sol

=== Group B ===
Pos	Team	Pld	W	WE	WP	L	GF	GA	GD	Pts	Qualification
1	Mexico	3	3	0	0	0	20	4	+16	9	Knockout stage
2	Trinidad and Tobago	3	2	0	0	1	14	10	+4	6	Knockout stage
3	Guadeloupe	3	1	0	0	2	14	19	−5	3	
4	Turks and Caicos Islands	3	0	0	0	3	8	23	−15	0	

Source: CONCACAF
28 March 2015
15:15

Trinidad and Tobago	8–4	Guadeloupe
Kevon Woodley 7', 14', 27', 29', 32', 35'; Makan Hislop 32'; Kerwin Stafford 36'	Report 1 Report 2	KevIn Clairon 2'; Sebastien Hell 22'; Marvin Bourgeois 28'; Richardson Petit 29'

Estadio de Fútbol Playa, Costa del Sol
Referee: Jose Misel (El Salvador)
28 March 2015
19:00

Turks and Caicos Islands	3–8	Mexico
Mackenson Cadet 19'; Herby Magny 27'; Carlo Guillaume 30'	Report 1 Report 2	Ramón Maldonado 1'; Diego Rodríguez 1', 23'; David González 4'; Gerardo Gómez 21'; Adrian González 26'; Angel Rodríguez 29', 35'

Estadio de Fútbol Playa, Costa del Sol

29 March 2015
15:15

Trinidad and Tobago	6–2	Turks and Caicos Islands
Makan Hislop 3'; Kevon Woodley 11', 30'; Victor Thomas 13'; Kerwin Stafford 23'; Ryan Augustine 32'	Report 1 Report 2	Herby Magny 34', 35'

Estadio de Fútbol Playa, Costa del Sol
29 March 2015
16:30

Mexico	8–1	Guadeloupe
Adrian González 9'; Francisco Cati 14', 33'; Ramón Maldonado 19', 24'; Gerardo Gómez 27', 34'; Diego Rodríguez 31'	Report 1 Report 2	Sebastien Hell 21'

Estadio de Fútbol Playa, Costa del Sol

31 March 2015
16:30

Guadeloupe	9–3	Turks and Caicos Islands
Damien Granchi 2', 29'; Marvin Bourgeois 5'; Sylrick Phirmis 7', 24'; Terry Folin 10'; Richardson Petit 16'; Arnaud Crimee 29'; Terry Shillingford 30'	Report 1 Report 2	Herby Magny 19', 23'; Patrick Slattery 31'

Estadio de Fútbol Playa, Costa del Sol
31 March 2015
20:15

Mexico	4–0	Trinidad and Tobago
Diego Rodríguez 1', 35'; Francisco Cati 26'; Ramón Maldonado 29'	Report 1 Report 2

Estadio de Fútbol Playa, Costa del Sol

=== Group C ===
Pos	Team	Pld	W	WE	WP	L	GF	GA	GD	Pts	Qualification
1	United States	3	3	0	0	0	14	6	+8	9	Knockout stage
2	Bahamas	3	2	0	0	1	16	13	+3	6	Knockout stage
3	Antigua and Barbuda	3	1	0	0	2	14	15	−1	3	
4	Barbados	3	0	0	0	3	14	24	−10	0	

Source: CONCACAF
28 March 2015
14:00

Bahamas	10–4	Barbados
Lesly St. Fleur 2', 26', 28'; Ehren Hanna 4'; Gary Joseph 10', 23', 32'; Gavin Christie 20'; Nesly Jean 20', 21'	Report 1 Report 2	Tito Beckles 5'; Akeem Bourne 7', 17'; Duan Best 9'

Estadio de Fútbol Playa, Costa del Sol
Referee: Rodil Cornejo (El Salvador)
28 March 2015
17:45

Antigua and Barbuda	1–4	United States
Omarie Daniel 19'	Report 1 Report 2	Andrew Feld 13'; Christopher Toth 20'; Lewie Valentine 25'; Nicolas Perera 35'

Estadio de Fútbol Playa, Costa del Sol
Referee: Gonzalo Martínez

30 March 2015
15:15

Bahamas	4–3	Antigua and Barbuda
Lesly St. Fleur 6', 19'; Ehren Hanna 14'; Gershum Philip 26' (o.g.)	Report 1 Report 2	Odel Murray 2', 6', 15'

Estadio de Fútbol Playa, Costa del Sol
30 March 2015
19:00

United States	4–3	Barbados
Chris Cummings 13'; Nicolas Perera 27', 36'; Jason Leopoldo 29'	Report 1 Report 2	Tito Beckles 26'; Jamar Grazette 30', 35'

Estadio de Fútbol Playa, Costa del Sol

31 March 2015
15:15

Barbados	7–10	Antigua and Barbuda
Jamar Grazette 2', 29'; Akeem Bourne 5', 13', 14'; Nicholas Jones 27', 28'	Report 1 Report 2	Odel Murray 1', 22'; Teon Miller 9'; Troy Dublin 10'; Stephen Hughes 11', 34'; Desmond Bleau 16'; Dave Carr 17', 23'; Prince Walters 25'

Estadio de Fútbol Playa, Costa del Sol
31 March 2015
19:00

United States	6–2	Bahamas
Lewie Valentine 2', 33', 35'; Jason Leopoldo 4'; Alessandro Canale 14'; Max Griffin 30'	Report 1 Report 2	Lesly St. Fleur 26', 33'

Estadio de Fútbol Playa, Costa del Sol

=== Group D ===
Pos	Team	Pld	W	WE	WP	L	GF	GA	GD	Pts	Qualification
1	Costa Rica	3	3	0	0	0	25	9	+16	9	Knockout stage
2	Guatemala	3	2	0	0	1	20	7	+13	6	Knockout stage
3	Panama	3	1	0	0	2	17	13	+4	3	
4	U.S. Virgin Islands	3	0	0	0	3	5	38	−33	0	

Source: CONCACAF
29 March 2015
14:00

Guatemala	2–1	Panama
Ángel Joel Sáenz Gómez 16'; Miguel Ángel González Enríquez 28'	Report 1 Report 2	Ricardo Antonio Obregón Torres 9'

Estadio de Fútbol Playa, Costa del Sol
29 March 2015
20:15

U.S. Virgin Islands	1–12	Costa Rica
Adam Fuller 24'	Report 1 Report 2	Christian Alonso Sánchez González 1', 29'; William Andrés León Cruz 3', 4'; Alfredo Gabriel Azuola Urea 4'; José Mendoza MacAdam 12'; Greivin Alberto Pacheco Quesada 16', 21', 21', 33'; Danny Johnson Hadson 20', 34'

Estadio de Fútbol Playa, Costa del Sol

30 March 2015
14:00

Guatemala	15–2	U.S. Virgin Islands
Ángel Joel Sáenz Gómez 1', 16', 17', 25'; Miguel Ángel González Enríquez 4', 14', 15', 16', 18'; Francisco Rivai Ochoa Ávila 11'; Álex Morán Ávila 13', 31'; Luis Carlos Zaldaña Pérez 19'; Flavio Ernesto García Marroquín 32'; Marco Tulio Ávila Zuñiga 33'	Report 1 Report 2	Zachary Adams 31'; Adam Fuller 35'

Estadio de Fútbol Playa, Costa del Sol
30 March 2015
17:45

Costa Rica	9–5	Panama
Luis Fernando Jiménez Arias 1'; Luis Alberto Quintero Guevara 2' (o.g.); Greivin Alberto Pacheco Quesada 4', 6', 23', 34'; William Andrés León Cruz 5'; Danny Johnson Hadson 20'; Alfredo Gabriel Azuola Urea 22'	Report 1 Report 2	Ricardo Antonio Obregón Torres 3'; Fernando Emir Barrera Cano 7'; Ali Irahin Del Cid Ruiz 11'; Luis Alberto Quintero Guevara 25'; Alberto Agustín Bultrón Barria 34'

Estadio de Fútbol Playa, Costa del Sol

31 March 2015
14:00

Panama	11–2	U.S. Virgin Islands
Ricardo Antonio Obregón Torres 4', 11'; Alberto Agustín Bultrón Barria 9', 14', 30'; Luis Alberto Quintero Guevara 13', 18'; Edgar Joel Rivas Medina 15'; Ali Irahin Del Cid Ruiz 25'; Fernando Emir Barrera Cano 26'; Eliseo Powell White 28'	Report 1 Report 2	Joseph Leto 16', 35'

Estadio de Fútbol Playa, Costa del Sol
31 March 2015
17:45

Costa Rica	4–3	Guatemala
William Andrés León Cruz 7'; Greivin Alberto Pacheco Quesada 10'; Danny Johnson Hadson 20'; Jossimar Antonio Downer Aguilar 27'	Report 1 Report 2	Álex Morán Ávila 12'; Ángel Joel Sáenz Gómez 18'; Ever Kenedy Ávila Amaya 25'

Estadio de Fútbol Playa, Costa del Sol

== Knockout stage ==
=== Bracket ===
Quarter-finals
2 April
United States	7
Jamaica	3
2 April
Mexico	5
Guatemala	2
2 April
Costa Rica	2
Trinidad and Tobago	1
2 April
El Salvador	6
Bahamas	0

Semi-finals
3 April
United States	3
Mexico	4
3 April
Costa Rica	2
El Salvador	1

Final
4 April
Mexico	4
Costa Rica	0
Third place
4 April
United States	2
El Salvador	5

Fifth Place Semi-finals
3 April
Jamaica	3
Guatemala	9
3 April
Trinidad and Tobago	4
Bahamas	1

Fifth Place
4 April
Guatemala	3
Trinidad and Tobago	4
Seventh Place
4 April
Jamaica	7
Bahamas (a.e.t.)	9

=== Quarter-finals ===
2 April 2015
16:30

Costa Rica	2–1	Trinidad and Tobago
Jossimar Antonio Downer Aguilar 11'; Greivin Alberto Pacheco Quesada 34'	Report 1 Report 2	Kerwin Stafford 33'

Estadio de Fútbol Playa, Costa del Sol
Referee: Gumercindo Batista
2 April 2015
17:45

United States	7–3	Jamaica
Alessandro Canale 1', 25'; Nicolás Perera 6', 13', 16', 20'; Christopher Toth 35'	Report 1 Report 2	Rohan Reid 9', 34'; Philip Venroy Peddie 18'

Estadio de Fútbol Playa, Costa del Sol
Referee: Nelson Bonilla
2 April 2015
19:00

Mexico	5–2	Guatemala
Ángel Rodríguez 1', 29'; Gerardo Gómez 2'; Adrian González 9', 20'	Report 1 Report 2	Álex Morán Ávila 20'; Ángel Joel Sáenz Gómez 24'

Estadio de Fútbol Playa, Costa del Sol
Referee: Álex Valdivieso
2 April 2015
20:15

El Salvador	6–0	Bahamas
Rubén Batres 6', 18'; F. Velásquez 11', 33'; José Ruiz 12', 36'	Report 1 Report 2

Estadio de Fútbol Playa, Costa del Sol
Referee: César Echevarría

=== Fifth place semi-finals ===
3 April 2015
16:30

Jamaica	3–9	Guatemala
Rohan Reid 3'; Gregory Simpson 19', 23'	Report 1 Report 2	Marco Tulio Ávila Zuñiga 7', 10'; Ángel Joel Sáenz Gómez 8'; Miguel Ángel González Enríquez 13'; Luis Gilmar Quezada Godoy 16'; Esau Polanco Vásquez 20'; Ever Kenedy Ávila Amaya 21'; Jersson Adolfo Alas León 24'; Luis Carlos Zaldaña Pérez 25'

Estadio de Fútbol Playa, Costa del Sol
Referee: Miguel Aguilar
3 April 2015
17:45

Trinidad and Tobago	4–1	Bahamas
Chad Appoo 8', 34'; Kevon Woodley 19'; Karrem Perry 27'	Report 1 Report 2	Lesly St. Fleur 28'

Estadio de Fútbol Playa, Costa del Sol
Referee: Gonzalo Carballo

=== Semi-finals ===
3 April 2015
19:00

United States	3–4	Mexico
Nicolás Perera 7'; Lewie Valentine 29'; Andrew Feld 31'	Report 1 Report 2	Ángel Rodríguez 1', 30'; Adrian González 4'; Francisco Cati 16'

Estadio de Futbol Playa, Costa del Sol
Referee: Antonio Pereira
3 April 2015
20:15

Costa Rica	2–1	El Salvador
Deyber Daniel Villegas Guerrero 14'; Greivin Alberto Pacheco Quesada 29'	Report 1 Report 2	F. Velásquez 22'

Estadio de Fútbol Playa, Costa del Sol

=== Seventh place match ===
4 April 2015
16:30

Jamaica	7–9 (a.e.t.)	Bahamas
Daemion Benjamin 2', 16', 31', 32'; Jermain Christopher Anderson 10', 21'; Kevin Wilson 29'	Report 1 Report 2	Kyle Williams 3', 39'; Lesly St. Fleur 11', 14', 18', 25', 28'; Gavin Christie 35', 37'

Estadio de Fútbol Playa, Costa del Sol

=== Fifth place match ===
4 April 2015
17:45

Guatemala	3–4	Trinidad and Tobago
Miguel Ángel González Enríquez 16', 32'; Ángel Joel Sáenz Gómez 19'	Report 1 Report 2	Kevon Woodley 7', 17'; Chad Appoo 10'; Kerwin Stafford 22'

Estadio de Fútbol Playa, Costa del Sol

=== Third place match ===
4 April 2015
19:00

United States	2–5	El Salvador
Harry Abraham 19', 21'	Report 1 Report 2	José Ruiz 1', 19'; Francisco Velásquez 5'; Rubén Batres 9'; Elmer Robles 30'

Estadio de Fútbol Playa, Costa del Sol

=== Final ===
4 April 2015
20:15

Mexico	4–0	Costa Rica
Ramón Maldonado 10', 14'; Adrian González 20'; Diego Rodríguez 34'	Report 1 Report 2

Estadio de Fútbol Playa, Costa del Sol

== Final ranking ==
Qualified for 2015 FIFA Beach Soccer World Cup

Rank	Team
1st place, gold medalist(s)	Mexico
2nd place, silver medalist(s)	Costa Rica
3rd place, bronze medalist(s)	El Salvador
4	United States
5	Trinidad and Tobago
6	Guatemala
7	Bahamas
8	Jamaica
9–16	Antigua and Barbuda
9–16	Barbados
9–16	Belize
9–16	Guadeloupe
9–16	Panama
9–16	Puerto Rico
9–16	Turks and Caicos Islands
9–16	U.S. Virgin Islands

== Awards ==
Best Player (MVP)	Top Scorer(s)	Best Goalkeeper
(Mexico) Ramón Maldonado	(El Salvador) Francisco Velásquez	(Mexico) Miguel Estrada

== Top goalscorers ==
15 goals

- (El Salvador) Francisco Velásquez

13 goals

- (The Bahamas) Lesly St. Fleur

11 goals

- (Costa Rica) Greivin Pacheco Quesada
- (Trinidad and Tobago) Kevon Woodley

9 goals

- (El Salvador) José Ruiz
- (Guatemala) Miguel González Enríquez
- (Guatemala) Ángel Sáenz Gómez
- (Jamaica) Rohan Reid

8 goals

- (United States) Nicolas Perera

7 goals

- (Jamaica) Daemion Benjamin

Source: CONCACAF.com
