= Kyle Williams (footballer) =

Bahamian footballer

Personal information
- Full name: Kyle Ramon Williams
- Date of birth: October 4, 1987 (age 39)
- Place of birth: Nassau, Bahamas
- Height: 5 ft 11 in (1.80 m)
- Position: Defender

Team information
- Current team: Bears

College career
Years	Team	Apps	(Gls)
2005–2006	Bowling Green Falcons	31	(2)
2008–2009	Tampa Spartans	44	(2)

Senior career*
Years	Team	Apps	(Gls)
2009	Bradenton Academics		
2013–	Bears		

International career^{‡}
2008–present	Bahamas	2	(0)
- * Club domestic league appearances and goals as of 7 December 2008 ‡ National team caps and goals as of 7 December 2008

Kyle Williams (born 4 October 1987) is an association football player from The Bahamas who currently plays for Bears.

== Club career ==
He played for the Bowling Green Falcons in 2005 and 2006 and joined the University of Tampa in 2008.

He played for the Bradenton Academics of the Premier Development League during the summer of 2009.

== International career ==
Williams made his debut for the Bahamas in a June 2008 World Cup qualification match against Jamaica. He also played in the return match, his only caps earned so far.

== Personal life ==
Williams works in banking.
