= 2013 CONCACAF Beach Soccer Championship =

2013 FIFA Beach Soccer World Cup Qualification (CONCACAF)
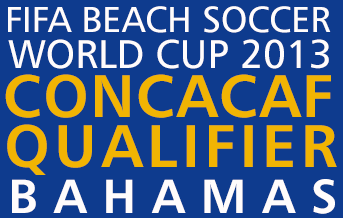

Tournament details
- Host country: Bahamas
- Dates: 8–12 May
- Teams: 10 (from 1 confederation)
- Venue: 1 (in 1 host city)

Final positions
- Champions: United States (2nd title)
- Runners-up: El Salvador
- Third place: Mexico
- Fourth place: Costa Rica

Tournament statistics
- Matches played: 21
- Goals scored: 198 (9.43 per match)
- Top scorer: (United States) Nick Perera (11 goals)
- Best player: (El Salvador) Agustin Ruiz
- Best goalkeeper: (United States) Christopher Toth

The 2013 CONCACAF Beach Soccer Championship took place from 8–12 May 2013, in Nassau, Bahamas, for the first time. This will also be the first time that the qualifiers have been held in the Caribbean. The two finalists of the championship qualified for the World Cup and represented North America in Tahiti.

All matches took place at the new Malcolm Park Beach Soccer and Futsal Facility in Nassau.

== Participating teams ==
The original record total of 11 teams were revealed on April 19, 2013.

North American Zone:

- Canada
- Mexico
- United States

Central American Zone:

- Costa Rica
- El Salvador
- Guatemala

Caribbean Zone:

- Bahamas
- Jamaica
- Puerto Rico
- Trinidad and Tobago

A team from Guyana was scheduled to participate, but withdrew from the tournament on 7 May 2013 due to administrative reasons. Guyana was scheduled to compete in Group B. Due to Guyana's withdrawal, the schedule was slightly modified as a result.

== Group stage ==
The draw to determine the groupings was conducted at the Atlantis Paradise Island Hotel in Nassau, the Bahamas, on 23 April 2013 at 1 PM EDT. The subsequent schedule was released two days later.

All match times are correct to that of local time in Nassau, being Eastern Daylight Time, (UTC -4).

=== Group A ===
Team	Pld	W	W+	L	GF	GA	GD	Pts
United States	3	3	0	0	19	4	+15	9
Bahamas	3	2	0	1	15	13	+2	6
Guatemala	3	1	0	2	14	11	+3	3
Puerto Rico	3	0	0	3	3	23	–20	0

clinched semifinal berth

8 May 2013
13:15

United States	5 – 2	Guatemala
N. Perera 5', 11', 35'; J. Leopoldo 5'; B, Taguinod 33'	Report	E. Suriano 2'; J. Veliz 14'

Malcolm Park Beach Soccer and Futsal Facility, Nassau

8 May 2013
15:45

Puerto Rico	1 – 9	Bahamas
E. Torres 12'	Report	L. St. Fleur 12', 16', 35'; K. Williams 6'; N. Jean 19'; M. Daniels 22'; G. Joseph 27', 34'; D. Forbes 28'

Malcolm Park Beach Soccer and Futsal Facility, Nassau

9 May 2013
13:15

United States	5 – 0	Puerto Rico
C. Toth 8'; N. Perera 16', 31'; K. Nakazawa 32'; M, Enfield 34'	Report

Malcolm Park Beach Soccer and Futsal Facility, Nassau

9 May 2013
15:45

Bahamas	4 – 3	Guatemala
M. Daniels 2'; N. Jean 15', 35'; E. Hanna 25'	Report	W. Gonzalez 7'; E. Samayoa 22'; W. Pineda 28'

Malcolm Park Beach Soccer and Futsal Facility, Nassau

10 May 2013
13:15

Guatemala	9 – 2	Puerto Rico
E. Samayoa 1', 28'; Valencia 6', 20', 26'; E. Suriano 14'; W. Pineda 23'; M. Perez 29'; F. Ramirez 35'	Report	Valencia 20' (o.g.); A. Torres 35'

Malcolm Park Beach Soccer and Futsal Facility, Nassau

10 May 2013
14:30

Bahamas	2 – 9	United States
L. St. Fleur 12'; G. Christie 28'	Report	N. Perera 5', 15', 32'; L. Valentine 7'; B. Taguinod 16', 16'; A. Chimienti 22', 36'; E. Meister 27'

Malcolm Park Beach Soccer and Futsal Facility, Nassau

=== Group B ===
Team	Pld	W	W+	L	GF	GA	GD	Pts
Mexico	2	2	0	0	19	1	+18	6
Trinidad and Tobago	3	1	0	2	11	17	–6	3
Canada	3	1	0	2	8	20	–12	3

clinched semifinal berth

8 May 2013
17:00

Mexico	10 – 0	Canada
M. Plata 3', 19', 26', 26'; A. Rodriguez 8', 9', 29'; G. Rosales 17'; J. Rodriguez 33'; R. Villalobos 34'	Report

Malcolm Park Beach Soccer and Futsal Facility, Nassau

9 May 2013
17:00

Mexico	9 – 1	Trinidad and Tobago
A. Rodriguez 10', 32'; R. Villalobos 10', 23'; M. Plata 11', 32'; G. Rosales 11'; J. Rodriguez 17'; F. Cati 20'	Report	S. Bobb 14'

Malcolm Park Beach Soccer and Futsal Facility, Nassau

10 May 2013
10:45

Canada	8 – 5	Trinidad and Tobago
Y. Rome-Gosselin 6', 8', 18', 24'; J. Lachambre 20'; P. Aoun 27'; D. Laraabi 31'; K. Selaidopoulos 34'	Report	C. Apoo 2', 20'; S. Bobb 6', 32'; D. McDougall 20'

Malcolm Park Beach Soccer and Futsal Facility, Nassau

10 May 2013
15:45

Canada	0 – 5	Trinidad and Tobago
	Report	C. Apoo 2', 3', 30'; J. Bailey 27'; S. Bobb 29'

Malcolm Park Beach Soccer and Futsal Facility, Nassau

=== Group C ===
Team	Pld	W	W+	L	GF	GA	GD	Pts
Costa Rica	2	1	1	0	15	8	+7	5
El Salvador	3	2	0	1	20	18	+2	6
Jamaica	3	0	0	3	9	18	–9	0

clinched semifinal berth	clinched wild card berth

8 May 2013
14:30

El Salvador	7 – 2	Jamaica
W. Torres 4', 33'; A. Ruiz 5', 27'; F. Velasquez 22', 32'; E. Robles 21'	Report	G. Simpson 18'; P. Peddie 23'

Malcolm Park Beach Soccer and Futsal Facility, Nassau

9 May 2013
12:00

Costa Rica	3 – 3 (a.e.t.)	Jamaica
I. Mora 8'; O. Brenes 20'; J. Mendoza 27'	Report	J. Anderson 13', 24'; P. Peddie 21'
Penalties
J. Mendoza (penalty scored); G. Pacheco (penalty scored)	2 – 1	P. Peddie (penalty scored); J. Anderson (penalty missed)

Malcolm Park Beach Soccer and Futsal Facility, Nassau

10 May 2013
12:00

El Salvador	5 – 12	Costa Rica
F. Velásquez 5', 11'; W. Torres 13', 23'; T. Hernández 19'	Report	J. Mendoza 5', 16', 33'; G. Pacheco 13', 19', 30', 36'; J. López 17', 18'; I. Mora 20'; G. Mena 31'; D. Johnson 34'

Malcolm Park Beach Soccer and Futsal Facility, Nassau

10 May 2013
17:00

El Salvador	8 – 4	Jamaica
E. Robles 10', 23', 33'; J. Batres 15'; F. Velásquez 19', 32'; W. Torres 27'; J. Membreño 33'	Report	P. Peddie 17', 17'; G. Simpson 24'; G. Neil 27'

Malcolm Park Beach Soccer and Futsal Facility, Nassau

== Placement matches ==
=== Ninth place match ===
11 May 2013
13:15

Jamaica	6 – 3	Puerto Rico
D. Planter 3'; K. Wilson 5'; D. Benjamin 8', 36'; C. Vendrell 8' (o.g.); A. Reid 29'	Report	R. Ortiz 3'; A. Rivera 25'; E. Matos 35'

Malcolm Park Beach Soccer and Futsal Facility, Nassau

=== Seventh place match ===
11 May 2013
14:30

Trinidad and Tobago	4 – 3	Canada
M. Hislop 5', 19', 32'; C. Apoo 31'	Report	Y. Rome-Gosselin 16'; P. Aoun 17'; O. Babineau 21'

Malcolm Park Beach Soccer and Futsal Facility, Nassau

=== Fifth place match ===
12 May 2013
15:45

Bahamas	6 – 6 (a.e.t.)	Guatemala
N. Jean 1'; K. Williams 15', 34'; E. Hanna 20', 39'; D. Forbes 31'	Report	J. Veliz 2'; W. Gonzalez 22', 31', 39'; L. Zaldana 27'; Valencia 29'
Penalties
N. Jean (penalty missed)	0 – 1	E. Samayoa (penalty scored)

Malcolm Park Beach Soccer and Futsal Facility, Nassau

== Knockout stage ==
After the group stage matches were completed, a draw was held after the last match to determine the semifinal matchups involving the group winners and the best second-place team.

Semifinals
A1	United States	4
C1	Costa Rica	3
B1	Mexico	3 (0)
W1	El Salvador (a.e.t.)	3 (1)

Final
SFW1	United States (a.e.t.)	5
SFW2	El Salvador	4
Third place match
SFL1	Costa Rica	7
SFL2	Mexico	8

=== Semifinals ===
11 May 2013
15:45

United States	4 – 3	Costa Rica
N. Perera 12'; F. Farberhoff 15'; L. Valentine 16'; A. Chimienti 18'	Report	G. Pacheco 2'; J. Lopez 12'; J. Mendoza 29'

Malcolm Park Beach Soccer and Futsal Facility, Nassau

11 May 2013
17:00

Mexico	3 – 3 (a.e.t.)	El Salvador
J. Rodríguez 8'; A. Rodríguez 34'; M. Plata 36'	Report	A. Ruiz 14'; W. Torres 27'; F. Velásquez 34'
Penalties
R. Villalobos (penalty missed)	0 – 1	W. Torres (penalty scored)

Malcolm Park Beach Soccer and Futsal Facility, Nassau

=== Third place match ===
12 May 2013
14:30

Costa Rica	7 – 8	Mexico
G. Pacheco 2', 22', 25'; I. Mora 18', 25'; J. Lopez 19'; O. Brenes 30'	Report	M. Plata 3'; J. Cervantes 4'; A. Rodriguez 7', 13'; R. Villalobos 18', 35'; J. Rodriguez 28'; F. Cati 34'

Malcolm Park Beach Soccer and Futsal Facility, Nassau

=== Final ===
12 May 2013
17:00

United States	5 – 4 (a.e.t.)	El Salvador
L. Valentine 6'; R. Futagaki 8', 15'; N. Perera 30', 39'	Report	E. Robles 2'; A. Ruiz 12'; W. Zabala 18'; F. Velásquez 27'

Malcolm Park Beach Soccer and Futsal Facility, Nassau

== Winners ==
(2013) FIFA Beach Soccer World Cup
Qualification (CONCACAF) Winners:

United States
Second title

== Awards ==
Best Player (MVP)
(El Salvador) Agustin Ruiz
Top Scorer
(United States) Nick Perera
11 goals
Best Goalkeeper
(United States) Chris Toth
FIFA Fair Play Award

== Qualifying teams ==
	Team
1st Place	United States
2nd Place	El Salvador

== Top scorers ==
11 goals

- (United States) Nick Perera

10 goals

- (Mexico) Morgan Plata

8 goals

- (El Salvador) Frank Velásquez
- (Costa Rica) Greivin Pacheco
- (Mexico) Angel Rodríguez

6 goals

- (El Salvador) Walter Torres
- (Trinidad and Tobago) C. Apoo

5 goals

- (El Salvador) Elmer Robles
- (Mexico) Ricardo Villalobos
- (Canada) Y. Rowe Gosselin

== Final standings ==
Rank	Team
1	United States
2	El Salvador
3	Mexico
4	Costa Rica
5	Guatemala
6	Bahamas
7	Trinidad and Tobago
8	Canada
9	Jamaica
10	Puerto Rico
