= Jamaica national beach soccer team =

National sports team

Jamaica
- Association: Jamaica Football Federation
- Confederation: CONCACAF (Caribbean)
- Head coach: Andrew Francis Price
- FIFA code: JAM
- BSWW ranking: NR (2 June 2025)
First colours
Second colours

CONCACAF Beach Soccer Championship
- Appearances: 4 (first in 2006)
- Best result: Fifth Place (2006)

The Jamaica national beach soccer team represents Jamaica in international beach soccer competitions and is controlled by the JFF, the governing body for football in Jamaica.

They appear to have stopped playing as of 2021.

== Current squad ==
Correct as of August 2015

Note: Flags indicate national team as defined under FIFA eligibility rules; some limited exceptions apply. Players may hold more than one non-FIFA nationality.

No.	Pos.	Nation	Player
1	GK		Kirk Porter
2	DF		Gerald Neil
3	DF		Ryan Powell
4	DF		Daemion Benjamin
5	MF		Rohan Reid
6	MF		André Reid
7	FW		Jermaine Anderson

No.	Pos.	Nation	Player
8	MF		Kevin Wilson
9	FW		Derrick Planter
10	FW		Phillip Peddie
11	FW		Gregory Simpson
12	GK		Elvis Hart
13	FW		Ovan Oakley

Coach: Andrew Francis Price

== Achievements ==
- CONCACAF Beach Soccer Championship Best: Fifth Place
  - 2006
