= 2010 CONCACAF Beach Soccer Championship =

2011 FIFA Beach Soccer World Cup Qualification (CONCACAF)

Tournament details
- Host country: Mexico
- Dates: 1–5 December
- Teams: 8 (from 1 confederation)
- Venue: 1 (in 1 host city)

Final positions
- Champions: Mexico (2nd title)
- Runners-up: El Salvador
- Third place: United States
- Fourth place: Costa Rica

Tournament statistics
- Matches played: 16
- Goals scored: 126 (7.88 per match)
- Top scorer(s): (El Salvador) Frank (Francisco Velasquez) (13 goals)
- Best player(s): (El Salvador) Frank (Francisco Velasquez)

The 2010 CONCACAF Beach Soccer Championship was a continental beach soccer tournament, which took place between December 1 and December 5, 2010, in Puerto Vallarta, Mexico, for the third time in a row. Organizers had hoped to extend the number of teams participating from six to eight after seeing newcomers Bahamas compete in the previous competition, and this indeed materialized with Jamaica returning after four years and Guatemala joining the tournament. This meant that the competition took place between two groups of four in a round-robin format, with the top two teams in each group qualifying to the knockout stage.

Only the two finalists would be the nations to progress to play in the 2011 FIFA Beach Soccer World Cup the following year, these nations being hosts Mexico, and El Salvador, seeing last years qualifying nation Costa Rica, lose out on a spot at the world cup. All matches took place at Unidad Deportiva Municipal Agustín Flores Contreras in Puerto Vallarta.

== Participating teams ==
Alternate logo for the tournament

Eight teams entered the tournament, the highest ever amount, with Guatemala being newcomers. Jamaica returned to the tournament after a four-year absence.

North American Zone:

- Canada
- Mexico
- United States

Central American Zone:

- Costa Rica
- El Salvador
- Guatemala

Caribbean Zone:

- Bahamas
- Jamaica

== Group stage ==
The draw to determine the groupings and schedule for the eight teams was held in Puerto Vallarta on November 24, 2010. For the draw, Mexico and the United States drew the top seeds in each group based on their current Beach Soccer Worldwide CONCACAF rankings, with Mexico being placed in Group A and the United States being placed in Group B. The remaining six teams were drawn from three pots (A, B and C), again based on their Beach Soccer Worldwide CONCACAF ranking from 2007 to 2009.

All match times are correct to that of local time in Puerto Vallarta time, being Central Standard Time, (UTC -6).

=== Group A ===
Team	Pld	W	W+	L	GF	GA	GD	Pts
El Salvador	3	2	1	0	19	14	+5	8
Mexico	3	2	0	1	9	6	+3	6
Canada	3	1	0	2	8	12	-4	3
Jamaica	3	0	0	3	13	17	-4	0

clinched semifinal berth

1 December 2010
13:30

El Salvador	6 – 3	Canada
Agustin 2'; Frank 11', 31', 35'; Walter 19', 31'	Report	Johnstone 11', 23', 28'

Unidad Deportiva Municipal Agustín Flores Contreras
Referee: (Spain) Joan Llompart

1 December 2010
16:00

Jamaica	2 – 3	Mexico
A. Reid 10'; Wilson 15'	Report	Rosales 12'; Torres 32'; Plata 35'

Unidad Deportiva Municipal Agustín Flores Contreras
Referee: (Costa Rica) Nelson Bonilla

2 December 2010
13:30

El Salvador	10 – 8	Jamaica
Agustin 1', 19', 34'; Hernández 8', 27'; Frank 9', 20', 27', 30'; Membreño 19'	Report	R. Reid 1', 4', 6', 23', 31', 35'; Davis 27'; A. Reid 31'

Unidad Deportiva Municipal Agustín Flores Contreras
Referee: (Spain) Joan Llompart

2 December 2010
16:00

Mexico	3 – 1	Canada
Barbosa 6'; Rosales 22'; López 24'	Report	Xavier 21'

Unidad Deportiva Municipal Agustín Flores Contreras
Referee: (Brazil) Felipe Varejao

3 December 2010
13:30

Canada	4 – 3	Jamaica
Roy 2'; Hughes 13'; Dosanjh 14'; Xavier 36'	Report	R. Reid 16', 24'; Simpson 32'

Unidad Deportiva Municipal Agustín Flores Contreras
Referee: (Costa Rica) Nelson Bonilla

3 December 2010
16:00

Mexico	3 – 3 (a.e.t.)	El Salvador
Barbosa 12'; López 22'; Villalobos 29'	Report	Frank 26', 30', 36'
Penalties
Barbosa (penalty missed)	0 – 1	(penalty scored) Walter

Unidad Deportiva Municipal Agustín Flores Contreras
Referee: (Spain) Hernan Fernandez

=== Group B ===
Team	Pld	W	W+	L	GF	GA	GD	Pts
United States	3	2	1	0	15	8	+7	8
Costa Rica	3	2	0	1	13	7	+6	6
Guatemala	3	1	0	2	11	16	-5	3
Bahamas	3	0	0	3	10	18	-8	0

clinched semifinal berth

1 December 2010
12:15

Costa Rica	5 – 2	Bahamas
Sánchez 3', 24'; Pacheco 3', 23'; Leon 12'	Report	St. Fleur 17'; Christie 27'

Unidad Deportiva Municipal Agustín Flores Contreras
Referee: (Brazil) Felipe Varejao

1 December 2010
14:45

Guatemala	2 – 6	United States
Avila 5'; Suriano 17'	Report	Futagaki 6'; Morales 11'; Ibsen 17'; Chimienti 19', 22', 29'

Unidad Deportiva Municipal Agustín Flores Contreras
Referee: (Brazil) Elias Coelho

2 December 2010
12:15

Costa Rica	5 – 2	Guatemala
Sánchez 17', 25', 27'; Leon 18'; Chavarría 28'	Report	Garcia 17'; Avila 21'

Unidad Deportiva Municipal Agustín Flores Contreras
Referee: (Brazil) Elias Coelho

2 December 2010
14:45

United States	6 – 3	Bahamas
Chimienti 5', 27'; Gil 13', 14'; Morales 33'; Ibsen 35'	Report	Beneby 13'; Hanna 21'; Jean 23'

Unidad Deportiva Municipal Agustín Flores Contreras
Referee: (Spain) Hernan Fernandez

3 December 2010
12:15

Bahamas	5 – 7	Guatemala
Hepple 1', 6'; Jean 8', 27'; Beneby 23'	Report	Avila 5', 7', 18'; Garcia 16'; Sáenz 17'; Polanco 24', 32'

Unidad Deportiva Municipal Agustín Flores Contreras
Referee: (Brazil) Felipe Varejao

3 December 2010
14:45

United States	3 – 3 (a.e.t.)	Costa Rica
Gil 11'; Futagaki 19'; Xexeo 29'	Report	Sánchez 25', 35'; Campos 36'
Penalties
Morales (penalty scored)	1 – 0	(penalty missed) Chavarría

Unidad Deportiva Municipal Agustín Flores Contreras
Referee: (Spain) Joan Llompart

== Knockout stage ==
Semi-finals
A1	El Salvador	3(2)
B2	Costa Rica	3(1)
B1	United States	1(0)
A2	Mexico	1(1)

Final
SF1	El Salvador	3
SF2	Mexico	5
3rd/4th-place match
SF1	Costa Rica	5
SF2	United States	7

=== Semi-finals ===
4 December 2010
14:45

El Salvador	3 – 3 (a.e.t.)	Costa Rica
Frank 10'; Agustin 12'; Hernández 23'	Report	Sánchez 5'; Chavarría 6'; Adanis 14'
Penalties
Walter (penalty scored); Agustin (penalty scored)	2 – 1	(penalty scored) Sánchez; (penalty missed) Chavarría

Unidad Deportiva Municipal Agustín Flores Contreras
Referee: (Spain) Hernan Fernandez

4 December 2010
16:00

United States	1 – 1 (a.e.t.)	Mexico
Gil 6'	Report	Plata 1'
Penalties
Morales (penalty missed)	0 – 1	(penalty scored) Torres

Unidad Deportiva Municipal Agustín Flores Contreras
Referee: (Spain) Joan Llompart

=== Third Place ===
5 December 2010
14:45

Costa Rica	5 – 7	United States
Sánchez 1', 5', 34'; Calvo 28'; Chavarría 31'	Report	Futagaki 13'; Albuquerque 15', 32'; Morales 20'; Ibsen 21'; Farberoff 27'; Chimienti 33'

Unidad Deportiva Municipal Agustín Flores Contreras
Referee: (Ecuador) Jose Cortez

=== Final ===
5 December 2010
16:00

El Salvador	3 – 5	Mexico
Ramírez 3', 12'; Frank 17'	Report	Barbosa 19', 20', 27', 29'; Rosales 34'

Unidad Deportiva Municipal Agustín Flores Contreras
Referee: (Panama) Óscar Arosemena

== Winners ==
(2011) FIFA Beach Soccer World Cup
Qualification (CONCACAF) winners:

Mexico
Second title

== Awards ==
Best Player (MVP)
(El Salvador) Frank (Francisco Velasquez)
Top Scorer
(El Salvador) Frank (Francisco Velasquez)
13 goals
Best Goalkeeper
(Mexico) Miguel Estrada
FIFA Fair Play Award
Canada

== Teams Qualifying ==
	Team
1st Place	Mexico
2nd Place	El Salvador

== Top scorers ==
12 goals

- (El Salvador) Frank (Francisco Velasquez)

11 goals

- (Costa Rica) Jonathan Sanchez

8 goals

- (Jamaica) Rohan Reid

6 goals

- (United States) Anthony Chimienti
- (Mexico) Antonio Barbosa

5 goals

- (Guatemala) Marco Avila
- (El Salvador) Jose Agustin Ruiz

4 goals

- (United States) Oscar Gil

3 goals

- (Canada) Marcus Johnstone
- (The Bahamas) Nesley Jean
- (El Salvador) Tomas Hernandez
- (Costa Rica) Jeffrey Chavarria
- (United States) Zak Ibsen

3 goals (cont.)

- (United States) Yuri Morales
- (United States) Ryan Futagaki
- (Mexico) Gustavo Rosales

2 goals

- (Jamaica) Andre Reid
- (Costa Rica) William Leon
- (Costa Rica) Greivin Pacheco
- (Canada) Bruno Xavier
- (El Salvador) Walter Torres
- (Mexico) Victor Lopez
- (The Bahamas) Cameron Hepple
- (The Bahamas) Daron Beneby
- (Guatemala) Luis Garcia
- (Guatemala) Esau Polanco
- (Mexico) Morgan Plata
- (United States) Jevin Albuquerque

1 goal

- (Mexico) Franz Torres
- (Jamaica) Fabian Davis
- (Costa Rica) Claudio Adanis
- (The Bahamas) Gavin Christie

1 goal (cont.)

- (The Bahamas) Ehren Hanna
- (El Salvador) Jose Membreno
- (El Salvador) Elias Ramirez
- (The Bahamas) Lesly St. Fleur
- (Guatemala) Erick Suriano
- (Jamaica) Kevin Wilson
- (Canada) Tyler Hughes
- (Canada) Jocelyn Roy
- (Canada) Gagan Dosanjh
- (Jamaica) Gregory Simpson
- (Mexico) Ricardo Villalobos
- (Guatemala) Angel Saenz
- (United States) Raphael Xexeo
- (United States) Francis Farberoff
- (Costa Rica) Jason Campos
- (Costa Rica) Claudio Adanis
- (Costa Rica) Jose Calvo

Own goal

- (Jamaica) Fabian Davis (for Canada)

== Final standings ==
Rank	Team
1	Mexico
2	El Salvador
3	United States
4	Costa Rica
5	Canada
6	Guatemala
7	Jamaica
8	Bahamas
