= Costa Rica national beach soccer team =

National sports team

Costa Rica
- Association: Costa Rican Football Federation
- Confederation: CONCACAF (Central America)
- Head coach: Jefferson Martins
- FIFA code: CRC
- BSWW ranking: 47 ▼5 (1 June 2026)
First colours
Second colours

World Cup
- Appearances: 2
- Best result: Group Stage (2009, 2015)

CONCACAF Beach Soccer Championship
- Appearances: 6 (first in 2006)
- Best result: Runners Up (2009, 2015)

The Costa Rica national beach soccer team represents Costa Rica in international beach soccer competitions and is controlled by the Costa Rican Football Federation, the governing body for football in Costa Rica.

== Competitive record ==
FIFA Beach Soccer World Cup record
Year	Round	Position	Pld	W	W+	L	GF	GA	GD	Pts
(Brazil) 2005	did not qualify									
(Brazil) 2006	did not qualify									
(Brazil) 2007	did not qualify									
(France) 2008	did not qualify									
(United Arab Emirates) 2009	Group Stage	15th	3	0	0	3	2	14	-12	0
(Italy) 2011	did not qualify									
(French Polynesia) 2013	did not qualify									
(Portugal) 2015	Group Stage	16th	3	0	0	3	6	17	-11	0
(The Bahamas) 2017	did not qualify									
(Paraguay) 2019	did not qualify									
(Russia) 2021	did not qualify									
(United Arab Emirates) 2024	did not qualify									
(Seychelles) 2025	did not qualify									
Total			6	0	0	6	8	31	-23	0

== Achievements ==
- FIFA Beach Soccer World Cup Best: Fifteenth Place
  - 2009
- CONCACAF Beach Soccer Championship Best: Runners-up
  - 2009
  - 2015
