= Ben Astorga =

American former beach soccer player and coach

Personal information
- Full name: Benyam Astorga
- Date of birth: May 14, 1972 (age 54)
- Place of birth: United States
- Positions: Defender; forward

Senior career*
| Years | Team | Apps | (Gls) |
| 1998 | Miami Breakers | 1 | (4) |
| 2010–2013 | Florida Beach Soccer FC | 34 | |

International career
| 2001–2008; 2012 | United States (Beach) | 27 | (11) |

Managerial career
- 2013–2015: Trinidad and Tobago (Beach) (AC)
- 2016: United States (Footvolley) (HC)
- 2015–2017: Trinidad and Tobago (Beach) (HC)
- 2020–2024: Gulliver Prep (AC)
- 2021–2024: United States (Beach) (AC)
Medal record
Men's Beach Soccer
Representing United States
CONCACAF Beach Soccer Championship
| Bronze medal – third place | 2005 | 3rd |
| Gold medal – first place | 2006 | 1st |
| Gold medal – first place | 2007 | 1st |
| Bronze medal – third place | 2008 | 3rd |
- * Club domestic league appearances and goals

Benyam "Ben" Astorga (born May 14, 1972) is an American former beach soccer player and former assistant coach for the U.S. Men's National Beach Soccer Team. He played in three FIFA Beach Soccer World Cups and was named to the 2025 National Soccer Hall of Fame Veteran Eligibility List.

== Early life ==
Benyam Astorga was born on May 14, 1972, in the United States.

== Playing career ==
=== Professional ===
In the 1998 season, Astorga played for the Miami Breakers in the USL D-3 Pro League. On July 19, he scored a goal in a victory against Orlando.

=== International ===
Ben Astorga represented the United States Men’s National Beach Soccer Team across a decade, earning 27 caps and scoring 11 goals during the modern era (2005–present). He was one of three players to appear in the first three FIFA Beach Soccer World Cups (2005, 2006, 2007), scoring seven goals in eight World Cup matches. His goals include the match-winner in the United States’ first-ever World Cup victory against Poland in 2006 and another in the team's second World Cup win against Iran in 2007. During the 2006 World Cup, he scored twice in a 10–6 group stage loss to host nation Brazil, a match in which the U.S. recorded its highest-ever goal total against Brazil in official competition. His seven World Cup goals tie him with Anthony Chimienti for second-most among U.S. players, behind Nick Perera and Alessandro Canale (nine each).

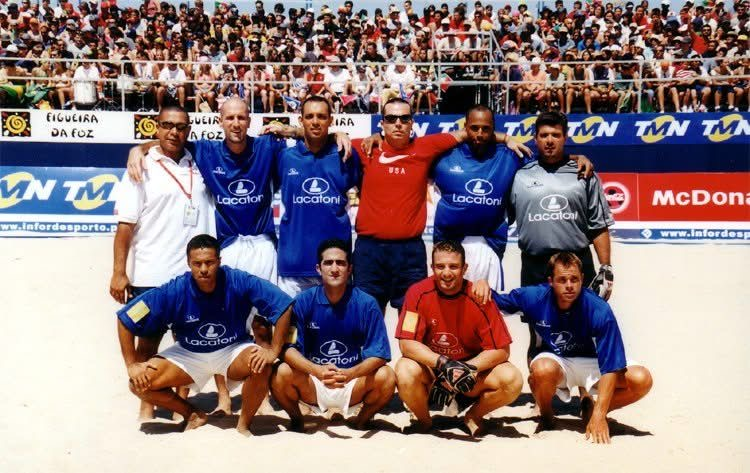
United States men's national beach soccer team, Figueira da Foz, Portugal, 2002. (top row, second to right)

Ben Astorga also competed in four CONCACAF Beach Soccer Championships (2005–2008), recording 16 caps and three goals. He helped the United States win its first regional title in 2006. At the same tournament, he scored four seconds into a match against Canada, setting a record for the fastest goal in CONCACAF Beach Soccer Championship history. After a four-year hiatus, he returned to the national team for the 2012 Copa América in Brazil, where he scored his final international goal against the host nation.

==== FIFA Beach Soccer World Cup performances ====
| Year | Venue | Games | Goals |
|---|---|---|---|
| 2005 | Brazil | 3 | 2 |
| 2006 | Brazil | 3 | 3 |
| 2007 | Brazil | 2 | 2 |
| Total | | 8 | 7 |

=== Club ===
Ben Astorga played for Florida Beach Soccer FC from 2010 to 2013, co-founding the team with teammates Francis Farberoff and Chris Antonopoulos. The team won the U.S. Open Beach Soccer Championship at the North American Sand Soccer Championships in 2011 and 2012, runners-up in 2013, and placed third in 2010. They also won the BagoSports Beach Football Invitational in 2011 with an undefeated record and the Clearwater Beach Tournament, part of the Major Beach Soccer National Championship Series.

== Coaching career ==
=== Trinidad and Tobago ===
Ben Astorga began coaching as an assistant for the Trinidad and Tobago national beach soccer team at the 2013 CONCACAF Beach Soccer Championship in Nassau, Bahamas, where the team finished seventh. Appointed head coach in March 2015, succeeding Alexandre Soares, he led the team to fifth place at the 2015 CONCACAF Beach Soccer Championship in El Salvador and won the 2015 Lucayan Cup, defeating the Bahamas (5–3) and Mexico (5–4). Under his tenure, Trinidad and Tobago placed seventh at the 2017 CONCACAF Beach Soccer Championship.

=== United States (Footvolley) ===
Ben Astorga served as the head coach of the USA national footvolley team during the 2016 Olympic demonstration event in Rio de Janeiro, Brazil.

=== United States (Beach) ===
Ben Astorga joined the U.S. Beach Soccer National Team as assistant coach in 2021 under Francis Farberoff, contributing to qualifications for the 2019 FIFA Beach Soccer World Cup in Paraguay and the 2021 FIFA Beach Soccer World Cup in Russia. He coached at the 2024 FIFA Beach Soccer World Cup in Dubai, where the U.S. lost 3–2 in extra time to the UAE.

== Other ==
- In August 2024, Astorga was included on the Veteran Eligibility List for the National Soccer Hall of Fame’s 2025 election cycle.
- Astorga served as a CONCACAF Beach Soccer Instructor.

== Honors ==
=== Player ===
Florida Beach Soccer FC

- North American Sand Soccer Championships US Open: 2011, 2012; second place 2013; third place 2010
- BagoSports Beach Football Invitational Champion: 2011
- Clearwater Beach Tournament/Major Beach Soccer National Championship: 2010, 2011
- Beach Soccer Championship (Oceanside) USA Pro Cup: 2011

United States

- CONCACAF Beach Soccer Championship: 2006, 2007; bronze medal 2005, 2008

=== Coach ===
Trinidad and Tobago

- Lucayan Cup: 2015
