= Francis Farberoff =

Brazilian-American beach soccer player and coach

Personal information
- Full name: Francis Farberoff
- Date of birth: March 16, 1975 (age 51)
- Place of birth: Rio de Janeiro, Brazil
- Position: Defender

Youth career
- 1994–1997: St. Thomas University

Senior career*
Years	Team	Apps	(Gls)
1998–2002	Flamilia		
2005–2006	Team Rio	14	
2011–2012	Seattle Sounders	1	(0)
2010–2013	Florida Beach Soccer FC	34	

International career^{‡}
2000–2014	United States	100+	(18)
2006	United States (footvolley)		

Managerial career
- 2014–2020: United States (assistant, men)
- 2020–2023: United States (women)
- 2020–2024: United States (men)
- 2023: Cali BSC
- 2024–present: NBSL (development director)
- 2025: Bahamas
- 2025: Vasco da Gama (assistant)
Medal record
Men's Beach soccer
Representing United States
CONCACAF Beach Soccer Championship
Bronze medal – third place	2005	3rd
Gold medal – first place	2006	1st
Gold medal – first place	2007	1st
Bronze medal – third place	2008	3rd
Bronze medal – third place	2010	3rd
Gold medal – first place	2013	1st
- * Club domestic league appearances and goals ‡ National team caps and goals as of 2014

Francis Farberoff (born March 16, 1975) nicknamed "El Capitan", is a Brazilian-born American former professional beach soccer player and manager. Regarded as one of the most prominent figures in United States beach soccer, he earned over 100 caps for the United States men's national beach soccer team between 2000 and 2014, serving eleven years as captain and appearing in four FIFA Beach Soccer World Cups. At the club level, he won a Brazilian National Championship with Corinthians, captained the Seattle Sounders at the Mundialito de Clubes, and secured domestic titles with Flamilia, Team Rio, and Florida Beach Soccer FC.

Following his playing career, Farberoff transitioned to management and was appointed the dual head coach of both the United States men's and women's national teams from 2020 to 2024. He became the most statistically successful manager of the men's modern era, guiding the team to back-to-back FIFA World Cups (2021 and 2024) and capturing the 2023 CONCACAF Beach Soccer Championship. He subsequently coached the Bahamas national beach soccer team and served as an assistant coach for CR Vasco da Gama. Professionally, Farberoff is the co-founder and development director of the National Beach Soccer League (NBSL) and is the president of Futbol-Beach Soccer-Futsal Club (FBS-FC).

== Early life and education ==
Francis Farberoff was born on March 16, 1975, in Rio de Janeiro, Brazil, to a Brazilian mother and a Colombian father of Russian descent. His paternal grandfather, Moises Farberoff, had emigrated from the Russian Empire to Medellín, Colombia, in 1926 Raised between Brazil and Colombia, Farberoff was immersed in Rio's beach culture from a young age, playing informal beach soccer on local sands. A formative moment occurred during the 1982 FIBA World Championship in Medellín, when his grandfather hosted the eventual champion Soviet Union team for a family dinner.

In 1991, at the age of 16, Farberoff relocated to Miami, Florida, to live with his grandfather where began playing beach soccer regularly on local beaches.

Farberoff attended St. Thomas University in Miami, earning a Bachelor’s degree in Broadcast Journalism in 1997 while playing varsity men’s soccer under coach Barry Kaplan.

== Playing career ==
=== International ===
Francis Farberoff was a longtime member of the United States Men's National Beach Soccer Team, representing the country from 2000 to 2014 earning the name "El Capitan." Over his 14-year tenure, he earned more than 100 caps and served as team captain from 2003 to 2014.

By 1998, he was active in the domestic circuit with club teams like Flamilia. His first international cap arrived just two years later on February 10, 2000, when he debuted for the United States during a 6–4 win against Uruguay at the Beach Soccer World Championships.

Farberoff played in four Beach Soccer World Championships (2000-2004) contributing four goals and four FIFA Beach Soccer World Cups: 2005, 2006, 2007 (all in Brazil), and 2013 (in Tahiti). He played a key role in the United States' performances in these tournaments. He played in 7 CONCACAF tournaments, helping the U.S. win three CONCACAF Beach Soccer Championships in 2006, (won Group B) 2010 (won Group B), and 2013 and additionally, he won the 2005 and 2007 CONCACAF–CONMEBOL Beach Soccer Championship (coming in at 3rd at the 2008 and 2010 and fourth in 2009). At the 2006 CONCACAF Championship in Costa Rica, he was named Most Valuable Player (MVP) after scoring in the final and leading the team to a 4–3 victory over Mexico.

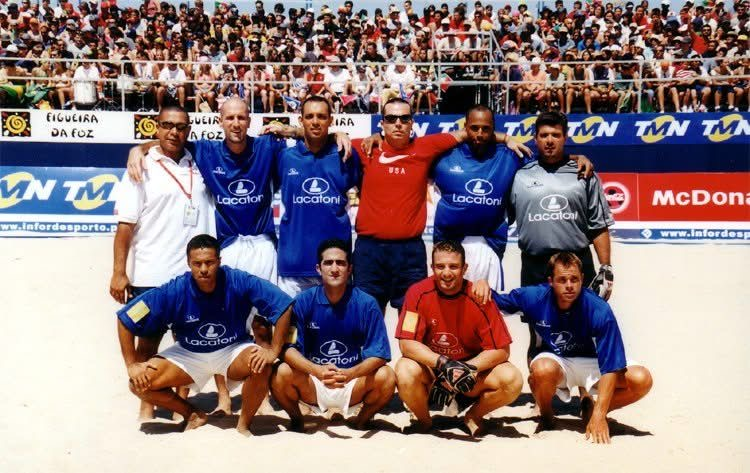
United States men's national beach soccer team, Figueira da Foz, Portugal, 2002 (top, second to left)

=== Footvolley ===
Farberoff also participated in international footvolley competitions representing the United States. In 2006, he represented the U.S. alongside Albuquerque at an event in Thailand, and later that year teamed up with Sergio Menezes at an event in Valencia, Spain.

=== Club ===
Familia

Farberoff played for Flamilia, a club team. During this early period of his club career, Farberoff contributed to Flamilia's success at the U.S. Open North American Sand Soccer Championships (NASSC), including winning the U.S. Open division titles in 2001 and 2002. back-to-back championship.

Team Rio

Francis Farberoff was a member of Team Rio, which won back-to-back championships at the U.S. Open NASSC in 2005 and 2006. Farberoff won MVP at the 2006 competition.

Seattle Sounders

Farberoff played for the Seattle Sounders FC beach soccer team from 2011 to 2012, which was coached by Marcelo Mendes and competed in the 2011 and 2012 FIFA-sanctioned Mundialito de Clubes tournament in Brazil as team captain (Beach Soccer Club World Cup). The team made it to the quarter finals in 2011 and the group stage in 2012.

Corinthians

Farberoff won a Brazilian Beach Soccer Club Championship with Corinthians.

Florida Beach Soccer FC

He also captained for Florida Beach Soccer FC from 2010 to 2013. The team won the U.S. Open Beach Soccer Championship at the North American Sand Soccer Championships (NASSC) in 2011 and 2012, coming in third in 2010, and were runners up in 2013. The team came third at the Beach Soccer Championships in Oceanside, California. The club additionally won titles at events such as the 2011 BagoSports Beach Football Invitational in Trinidad and Tobago (undefeated run) and contributed to domestic successes like the USL Major Beach Soccer national championship in Clearwater, Florida.

== Coaching career ==
=== United States (Men's) ===
Farberoff served as assistant coach for the United States men's national beach soccer team from 2014 to 2020, including at the 2019 FIFA Beach Soccer World Cup in Paraguay.

Appointed head coach of the U.S. Men’s National Team in 2020, he led the men’s team to the 2021 FIFA Beach Soccer World Cup in Moscow and the 2024 FIFA Beach Soccer World Cup in Dubai, where they lost 3–2 in extra time to the UAE. Farberoff is statistically the most successful coach of the modern era. In 2023, he led the U.S. to its best-ever single-year record (11-3-0), achieving a program-record .786 win percentage, a +43 goal differential, and 75 goals scored. Winning the 2023 CONCACAF Beach Soccer Championship title (6-0 record in tournament), 5–0 vs. Mexico and a record 11–3 season. He was let go as head coach in 2024.

=== United States (Women's) ===
In addition to his responsibilities with the men's program, Farberoff was an early figure in the launch and development of the United States women's national beach soccer team (Beach WNT). During the program's inaugural campaign in 2019, he served on the coaching staff to help prepare the newly formed squad for its first competitive international fixtures, culminating in a fifth-place finish overall at the 2019 ANOC World Beach Games in Doha, Qatar. He managed the women's tracking pool through late 2023, setting a framework for the program before his overarching tenure with U.S. Soccer concluded in early 2024.

=== Cali BSC ===
Farberoff has served as head coach for Cali BSC in 2023 at the World Winners Cup in Alghero, Italy.

=== Bahamas ===
In 2025, Farberoff became head coach of the Bahamas national beach soccer team, leading them to a fourth-place finish at the 2025 CONCACAF Beach Soccer Championship in Nassau. The team lost to Guatemala in the semifinals before losing 6–2 in the third-place match against the United States.

=== Vasco da Gama ===
Farberoff joined Vasco da Gama as assistant coach for the 2025 season.

=== Other roles ===
Farberoff is a FIFA and CONCACAF beach soccer instructor. In 2016 he managed a practical training course in Panama, organized by the Panamanian Football Federation.

He serves as the president of Futbol-Beach Soccer-Futsal Club (FBS-FC) in Miami.

== Honours ==
=== Player ===
United States national beach soccer team

CONCACAF Beach Soccer Championship: Winner (2006, 2007, 2013); Bronze (2005, 2008, 2010)

Club

North American Sand Soccer Championships: Winner (8 times)

Brazilian Beach Soccer Club Championship: Winner – Corinthians

=== Coach ===
United States national beach soccer team

CONCACAF Beach Soccer Championship: Winner: 2023

=== Individual ===
CONCACAF Beach Soccer Championship MVP: 2006

Veteran category for the National Soccer Hall of Fame 2025, 2026, and 2027 class (finalist).
