= Fredo Dilbert =

American beach soccer player

Personal information
- Full name: Wilfredo Antonio Ramos Dilbert
- Date of birth: November 25, 1997 (age 28)
- Place of birth: Miami, Florida, United States
- Position: Forward

Youth career
- 2011-2012: Miami Shores

College career
Years	Team	Apps	(Gls)
2016-2017	Palm Beach Atlantic Sailfish	37 (2)	(8)

Senior career*
Years	Team	Apps	(Gls)
2012-2016	FBS-FC		
2023	Cali Beach Soccer Club	4	(1)
2024-	SoCal Legacy BSC	14	(3)

International career^{‡}
2018-	United States (beach)	10	(1)
- * Club domestic league appearances and goals ‡ National team caps and goals as of as of 2021

Fredo Dilbert (born November 25, 1997) is an American beach soccer player who plays as a forward for the United States Beach Men’s National Team. He has represented the U.S. in multiple international competitions, including the FIFA Beach Soccer World Cup and the Concacaf Beach Soccer Championship, where he contributed to the team’s qualification for the 2021 and 2024 World Cups.

== Early life ==
Fredo Dilbert was born Wilfredo Antonio Ramos Dilbert on November 25, 1997, in Miami, Florida. His mother, Alicia Hodgson, is from Honduras, while his father, Erich Kuhnke, was born in Miami and raised in Germany, where he played soccer for Eintracht Frankfurt’s reserve team and later competed in beach soccer for over 20 years.

Dilbert attended Palm Beach Atlantic University after heavy recruitment from Florida Gulf Coast University, where he played collegiate soccer. In his freshman year (2016), he appeared in all 19 matches, contributing five goals and two assists. During his sophomore year (2017), he played in 18 games, starting three, and recorded three goals and three assists.

== Club career ==
In April 2022, Dilbert played for the National Beach Soccer League (NBSL) All-Star squad in a series of friendly matches against Canada Beach Soccer, where he was named the Most Valuable Player (MVP) of the series.

Dilbert has competed at club level in beach soccer tournaments organized by Beach Soccer Worldwide. He represented Cali Beach Soccer Club at the World Winners Cup in 2023. He later joined SoCal Legacy BSC, participating in the Americas Winners Cup in El Salvador in 2024 and 2025, as well as the World Winners Cup in Sicily in 2025.

== International career ==
Dilbert made his debut for the United States men's national beach soccer team in 2018.

In May 2021, at the CONCACAF Beach Soccer Championship in Costa Rica, Dilbert tested positive for COVID-19 and missed two games. After returning, he scored his first two international goals against Mexico in a 5–2 semifinal win, helping the U.S. secure qualification for the 2021 FIFA Beach Soccer World Cup in Russia. In August 2021, he was named in his nation's squad for the 2021 FIFA Beach Soccer World Cup, where he represented his country.

He was part of the United States team which played in the Emirates Intercontinental Beach Soccer Cup in Dubai in November 2022.

In February 2023, Dilbert was included in the squad for two international friendlies against Spain in Salou. In October 2023, he was selected for a November training camp in Buenos Aires, Argentina, as preparation for the 2024 FIFA Beach Soccer World Cup.

Dilbert was named to the United States roster for the 2024 FIFA Beach Soccer World Cup in Dubai, United Arab Emirates, marking his second World Cup appearance. He was also part of squads for preparatory events in the 2025 World Cup cycle, including the 2024 El Salvador Beach Soccer Cup.

After the United States failed to qualify for the 2025 FIFA Beach Soccer World Cup, Marcelo Mendes was appointed as the new head coach in December 2025. In January 2026, Dilbert was called up by Mendes to a 15-player domestic training camp in Fort Lauderdale, Florida, running from January 12–18.

== Achievements ==
- MVP: Fredo Dilbert (NBSL)
