= Alessandro Canale (soccer) =

American beach soccer player

Personal information
- Full name: Tomas Alessandro Canale
- Date of birth: December 29, 1989 (age 36)
- Place of birth: Santa Monica, California, U.S.
- Height: 5 ft 9 in (1.75 m)
- Position: Forward

Youth career
- Santa Monica United Scorpions
- Santa Monica High School

College career
Years	Team	Apps	(Gls)
2010	USC Trojans	12	(1)
2012	Santa Monica College		(24)
2013–2014	UC San Diego Tritons	30	(7)

Senior career*
Years	Team	Apps	(Gls)
2017–2018	Orange County FC	1	(18)
2019	Los Angeles Force	3	(1)
2019–	Tacoma Stars	55	(40)
2020–2021	Billericay Town F.C.	1	(0)
2023	Culture By Mo Ali FC	4	(0)

International career^{‡}
2013–	United States (beach)	100+	(76)
2021–	United States (teqball)	10	
- * Club domestic league appearances and goals ‡ National team caps and goals as of March 17, 2025

Alessandro "Sandro" Canale (born December 29, 1989) is an American traditional, beach soccer, indoor soccer, and teqball player who plays as a forward for the U.S. Men's National Beach Soccer Team and indoor soccer for the Tacoma Stars. He played collegiate soccer for the USC, Santa Monica College, and UC San Diego, and has competed internationally in Teqball.

== Early life and education ==
Canale was born on December 29, 1989, in Santa Monica, California, and grew up in Venice Beach. He has an Italian father and a Costa Rican mother. Canale played youth club soccer for the Santa Monica United Scorpions. He graduated from Santa Monica High School in 2008, where he helped the Vikings go undefeated (29–0–1), win the CIF Los Angeles Section Division IV and CIF Southern Regional titles, and earn first-team all-league honors.

== Playing career ==
=== Collegiate soccer ===
In 2010, he played as a freshman forward for the Trojans men's soccer team at the University of Southern California, appearing in 12 games and scoring one goal. In 2012, he competed for Santa Monica College, scoring 24 goals and earning Offensive Player of the Year honors. He transferred to the University of California, San Diego, playing for the UC San Diego Tritons from 2013 to 2014.

As a junior in 2013, he started 15 of 18 games, scored five goals, and earned NSCAA All-West Region Third Team and All-CCAA honorable mention. In 2014, as team co-captain, he started all 12 games played, led the team with 37 shots, and recorded two goals and five assists before a season-ending injury.

He also competed in beach soccer during this period, representing the U.S. at the 2013 FIFA Beach Soccer World Cup in Tahiti.

Canale majored in Urban Studies and Planning at UC San Diego Muir College.

=== International beach soccer ===
Canale made his debut for the United States men's national beach soccer team on August 4, 2013, in a friendly against El Salvador. He was the youngest member of the 2013 FIFA Beach Soccer World Cup U.S. team.

He has represented the U.S. in multiple FIFA Beach Soccer World Cups, including 2013 in Tahiti (scoring twice against the UAE), 2019 in Paraguay (scoring 2 goals against Japan), in 2021 against Paraguay (scoring five goals), and 2024 in Dubai (scoring against the UAE). After the 2024 Beach WC, Canale became the first U.S. player to score at four Beach Soccer World Cups

For the 2021 World Cup Canale led the U.S. team in scoring for the tournament scoring 5 of the 11 goals scored. At the 2025 Concacaf Beach Soccer Championship, Canale contributed to the U.S.’s 6–2 victory over the Bahamas, securing third place. For the 2022 Mundialito, the team beat Mexico 5–0.

He reached his 100th cap in the 2025 semifinal against El Salvador on March 15, 2025, becoming the second U.S. beach soccer player to achieve this milestone.

Canale's goal tally of 76 ranks him second all-time among U.S. beach soccer players. He joins teammates Nick Perera and Chris Toth, along with former player Francis Farberoff, as one of the U.S. Beach Men's National Team players with the most FIFA Beach Soccer World Cup appearances.

=== Indoor soccer ===
Canale has been playing as a forward for the Tacoma Stars since 2019. In his rookie season he appeared in 18 games with 14 goals. By his fifth season with the team he averages 1.3 points per game with 61 points (40 goals in 21 assist in 51 games).

=== Club soccer ===
Canale played for Orange County FC. Canale in 2017 won player of the week chosen for the 2017 NPSL season as the 18th Mitre National Player of the Week. At the end of the 2017 season, Canale won the Golden Boot award for his performance in scoring 10 goals across two games and 18 goals on the season. During the 2018 season. He made an appearance in the US Open Cup, scoring one goal in the second round against Fresno FC.

In 2019, Canale played for the Los Angeles Force in the National Independent Soccer Association (NISA). He made 3 appearances, all as a starter, logging 262 minutes and scoring 1 goal. He contributed to 2 wins and 1 loss during the regular season. He received 1 yellow card and took 2 shots in total.

In the 2020–21 season, Canale made one appearance for Billericay Town in the FA Cup in England, registering no goals.

Canale played for Culture By Mo Ali FC during the inaugural The Soccer Tournament (TST) in 2023. In this tournament, he appeared in four matches, starting three, and played a total of 262 minutes. Despite his significant playing time, he did not record any goals or assists. The team achieved two wins and one loss during the group stage, with a total of 11 goals scored and 9 conceded.

=== Teqball ===
Canale has competed internationally in the sport of Teqball. Representing the United States, he participated in the Teqball World Championships Qualifiers where he came in 5th place. Canale did not qualify for the 2023 Teqball World Championships.

=== Omega Ball ===
Canale has also competed in Omega Ball, a three-team variant of soccer, where he played for team World against USA.

=== Street Soccer ===
Canale has participated in street soccer events, including appearing at the Street Slam Finals in Los Angeles with Street FC.

== Coaching ==
Alessandro Canale is a Nike Sport Camp coach.

== Career statistics ==
=== Collegiate ===
Season	Team	GP	GS	MIN	G	A	Pts	SHOT	SHOT%	SOG	SOG%	GW	PK-Att
2010	USC Trojans	12			1								0–0
2012	Santa Monica College				24	8							
2013	UC San Diego Tritons	18	15	1318	5	3	13	42	.119	20	.476	1	0–0
2014	UC San Diego Tritons	12	12	830	2	5	9	37	.054	15	.405	1	0–0
Totals		30*	27*	2148*	32	16	22*	79*	.089*	35*	.443*	2*	0–0*

*Totals exclude USC and Santa Monica College due to incomplete data.

=== Indoor soccer ===
Season	League	Team	GP	G	A	Pts	PIM	PPG	GWG	FC	Y	R	OFF	BL	Shts	S%	SOG	SG%
2019–20	MASL	Tacoma Stars	18	5	9	14	16	0	1	37	0	0	0	1	18	27.8	0	–
2020–21	MASL	Tacoma Stars	4	1	1	2	0:00	0	0	4	0	0	0	0	3	33.3	3	33.3
2021–22	MASL	Tacoma Stars	15	16	5	21	04:00	2	0	26	0	0	0	5	37	43.2	37	43.2
2023–24	MASL	Tacoma Stars	18	18	6	24	17:00	2	2	33	1	0	0	2	52	34.6	0	–
Totals			55	40	21	61	37	4	3	100	1	0	0	8	110	36.4	40	100.0

=== Teqbal ===
Year	Event	app	Third Sets Played	Pts/g	Pts/ga	Pt Diff/Game	Total Pts For	Total Pts Ag	Set 1 PF	Set 1 PA	Avg Pts S1	Set 2 PF	Set 2 PA	Avg Pts S2	Set 3 PF	Set 3 PA	Avg Pts S3
2023	Teqball World Champs Qualifiers	10	1	13.3	10.9	+2.4	133	109	69	47	6.9	52	52	5.2	12	10	12

=== Beach Soccer World Cup ===
Year	Competition	Games (G)	Goals	Assists (AST)
2013	Beach Soccer World Cup	?	2	?
2019	Beach Soccer World Cup	3	2	0
2021	Beach Soccer World Cup	3	5	1
2024	Beach Soccer World Cup	3	3	0

World Cup stats

== Other ventures ==
Beyond soccer, Canale has pursued diverse disciplines. He appeared as an actor in an episode of the television series Malcolm in the Middle. As an artist, he creates enchanting canvases and supersized murals. He designs custom sneakers. Canale is a skilled freestyle footballer, having impressed former England international Joe Cole with his tricks. He practices sand calisthenics and competes in teqball, a sport combining soccer and table tennis.
