= 2023 CONCACAF Beach Soccer Championship squads =

List of players to feature at the 2023 CONCACAF Beach Soccer Championship

The 2023 CONCACAF Beach Soccer Championship is an international beach soccer tournament held in the Bahamas from 8 to 14 May 2023. The 12 national teams involved in the tournament were required by CONCACAF to register a squad of 12 players, including two goalkeepers. This article lists the national beach soccer squads that will take part in the tournament. Only the players listed in these squads below are eligible to take part in the tournament.

The age listed for each player is as of 8 May 2023, the first day of the tournament.

== Group A ==
=== Costa Rica ===
Coach: Jefferson Martins

=== El Salvador ===
Coach: Rudis González Gallo

=== Guadeloupe ===
Coach:

=== Turks and Caicos Islands ===
Coach:

== Group B ==
=== Bahamas ===
Coach: Luiz Escobar Passos Da Silva

=== Belize ===
Coach: Renan Couoh

=== Guatemala ===
Coach: Raul Aldana

=== Mexico ===
Coach: Francisco Cati

== Group C ==
=== Dominican Republic ===
Coach:

=== Panama ===
Coach: Enrique Pérez Silva

=== Trinidad and Tobago ===
Coach: Benyam Astorga

=== United States ===
Coach: Francis Farberoff

The final squad was announced on 5 May 2023.

| No. | Pos. | Player | Date of birth (age) | Club |
|---|---|---|---|---|
| 1 | GK | Christopher Toth | 4 August 1989 (aged 33) | (United States) Tacoma Stars |
| 2 | DF | Alvaro Franco | | Unattached |
| 3 | DF | Antonio Chavez | | Unattached |
| 4 | MF | Ricardo Carvalho | | Unattached |
| 5 | DF | Nicolas Perea | 6 August 1992 (aged 30) | Unattached |
| 6 | MF | Cody Valcarcel | | Unattached |
| 7 | FW | Nick Perera (captain) | 5 June 1986 (aged 36) | (United States) Tacoma Stars |
| 14 | FW | Conner Rezende | 21 January 1993 (aged 30) | Unattached |
| 9 | FW | Alessandro Canale | 29 December 1989 (aged 33) | Unattached |
| 10 | MF | Gabriel Silveira | 28 April 1992 (aged 31) | Unattached |
| 11 | MF | Chris Albiston | 26 September 1992 (aged 30) | Unattached |
| 12 | GK | Austin Collier | | Unattached |
