= Anthony Chimienti =

American soccer player and coach

Personal information
- Date of birth: June 17, 1979 (age 47)
- Place of birth: San Jose, California, U.S.
- Position: Forward

College career
| Years | Team | Apps | (Gls) |
| 1998–2001 | Santa Clara University | | |

Senior career*
| Years | Team | Apps | (Gls) |
| 2004–2008 | Sacramento Knights | | |

International career
| 2005–2013 | United States (beach soccer) | 37 | (29) |

Managerial career
- Folsom Lake Earthquakes
- San Juan Soccer Club
- El Dorado United
- Cosumnes River College
- Sacramento State University
Medal record
Men's Beach soccer
Representing United States
CONCACAF Beach Soccer Championship
| Bronze medal – third place | 2005 | 3rd |
| Gold medal – first place | 2006 | 1st |
| Gold medal – first place | 2007 | 1st |
| Bronze medal – third place | 2008 | 3rd |
| Bronze medal – third place | 2010 | 3rd |
| Gold medal – first place | 2013 | 1st |
- * Club domestic league appearances and goals

Anthony Chimienti (born June 17, 1979) is an American retired soccer player who played as a forward for the United States national beach soccer team from 2005 to 2013 and with the Sacramento Knights in the National Premier Soccer League (NPSL), earning MVP honors in 2005 and 2006. He is currently a youth soccer coach in California.

== Early life ==
Anthony Chimienti was born on June 17, 1979, in San Jose, California. He grew up in a soccer-focused family, influenced by his father, brothers, and uncles, and began playing at age four. Chimienti holds a Bachelor's degree from Santa Clara University and a Master's degree from Fresno Pacific University.

== Playing career ==
=== College soccer ===
Chimienti played college soccer at Santa Clara University from 1998 to 2001 under coach Mitch Murray. He was the team's leading goal scorer in three of his four seasons and ranks among the school's all-time leaders in goals and points. He contributed to the Broncos reaching the NCAA Final Four in 1998 and the NCAA runner-up position in 1999. In his senior year (2001), he appeared in 11 matches, starting three, but missed eight games.

=== Professional soccer ===
From 2004 to 2008, Chimienti played for the Sacramento Knights in the NPSL. He was named NPSL MVP in 2005 and 2006 and scored the game-winning goal in the Knights' 2–0 victory in the 2006 NPSL national championship. He also played briefly for Sacramento Gold in the NPSL.

=== Beach soccer ===
Chimienti represented the United States national beach soccer team from 2006 to 2013, appearing in 37 matches and scoring 29 goals. He competed in three FIFA Beach Soccer World Cups, scoring nine goals in nine matches, placing him second among U.S. players in World Cup goal scoring. In the 2006 tournament in Brazil, he scored a brace in a win against Poland, marking one of the U.S.'s first World Cup victories. He added another brace against IR Iran in the 2007 tournament in Brazil, though the U.S. did not advance past the group stages in either event. He also participated at the 2009 World Cup qualifiers where he scored 3 goals in the tournament, one being 2 minutes into a match against the Bahamas. He also participated in the 2013 tournament in Tahiti, with no specific goal-scoring records available for that event. Chimienti played in six CONCACAF Beach Soccer Championships (2006, 2007, 2008, 2009, 2011, 2013), scoring 20 goals in 25 matches, including hat-tricks against the Bahamas in 2009 and Guatemala in 2011. He was part of the U.S. teams that won the championship in 2006 and 2013.

== Coaching career ==
After retiring from professional soccer, Chimienti pursued coaching, working with several youth and college teams in California. His roles include head coach for Folsom Lake Earthquakes (three years), San Juan Soccer Club (nine years, including U.S. Soccer Development Academy Under-19 teams), and El Dorado United (three years). He also served as an assistant coach for the men's soccer teams at Sacramento State University and Cosumnes River College.

== Other ==
In 2024, Chimienti was named an eligible candidate for the National Soccer Hall of Fame in the Veteran Player category for the 2025 election.
