= Zak Ibsen =

American retired soccer player (born 1972)

Personal information
- Date of birth: June 2, 1972 (age 54)
- Place of birth: Santa Clara, California, U.S.
- Height: 5 ft 11 in (1.80 m)
- Position: Defender

College career
Years	Team	Apps	(Gls)
1990–1992	UCLA Bruins		

Senior career*
Years	Team	Apps	(Gls)
1993	VfL Bochum II	5	(0)
1993	1. FC Saarbrücken II	2	(0)
1993	FC Rot-Weiß Erfurt	2	(0)
1994	Los Angeles Salsa	3	(0)
1995	Hawaii Tsunami	2	(0)
1995–1996	Baltimore Spirit (indoor)	17	(10)
1996	Tampa Bay Terror (indoor)	9	(2)
1996	New England Revolution	6	(0)
1996	Dallas Burn	16	(1)
1997	California Jaguars	15	(1)
1998	Chicago Fire	27	(0)
1999–2000	Los Angeles Galaxy	50	(3)
2001–2002	San Jose Earthquakes	41	(2)

International career
1992–1996	United States	15	(0)
2006–2010	United States (beach)	22	(9)
Medal record
Men's soccer
MLS Cup
Gold medal – first place	1998	Chicago Fire
Gold medal – first place	2001	San Jose Earthquakes
U.S. Open Cup
Gold medal – first place	1998	Chicago Fire
CONCACAF Champions' Cup
Gold medal – first place	2001	LA Galaxy
Men's Beach soccer
Representing United States
CONCACAF Beach Soccer Championship
Gold medal – first place	2006	1st
Gold medal – first place	2007	1st
Bronze medal – third place	2008	3rd
Bronze medal – third place	2010	3rd
- * Club domestic league appearances and goals

Zak Ibsen (born June 2, 1972) is an American retired soccer player who played professionally in Major League Soccer and the National Professional Soccer League and internationally for both the U.S. national and beach soccer teams.

== Early life ==
Zak Ibsen was born in Santa Clara, California. He developed a passion for soccer at a young age.

== Career ==
=== College ===
Ibsen played college soccer at UCLA. He helped lead the Bruins to an NCAA National Championship in 1990.

=== National ===
Ibsen was a member of the 1992 U.S. Olympic team and the U.S. National Team.

=== NPSL ===
Ibsen played in Germany and the National Professional Soccer League for the Baltimore Spirit as a midfielder before he was traded to the Tampa Bay Terror on January 17, 1996, in exchange for John Garvey.

=== MLS ===
He then joined Major League Soccer in 1996. Selected by New England in the 1996 MLS Supplemental Draft, he also later played for Dallas, Chicago, Los Angeles, and San Jose. He won MLS titles with the Chicago Fire in 1998 and the San Jose Earthquakes in 2001. During his MLS career, Ibsen played 140 games, scored 6 goals, and had 10 assists. His most notable assist came during MLS Cup 2001, in which he assisted Dwayne De Rosario's game-winning goal for the Earthquakes.

=== Beach ===
Zak Ibsen had a long involvement in beach soccer, beginning with the pre-FIFA era of the sport. He represented the United States in the Beach Soccer World Championships organized by Beach Soccer Worldwide (BSWW) prior to FIFA’s official adoption of the tournament in 2005. During these early competitions, Ibsen recorded 17 goal contributions, placing him among the top scorers in the tournament's history.

Following FIFA’s takeover, Ibsen continued to play for the United States national beach soccer team from 2006 to 2010, earning 22 caps and scoring 9 goals in official FIFA-sanctioned matches. He competed in the FIFA Beach Soccer World Cups in 2006 and 2007, scoring two goals in the 2007 edition, including the match-winner against Iran.

He was part of the U.S. squads that won the CONCACAF Beach Soccer Championships in 2006 and 2007, while finishing third in 2008 and 2010 and fourth in 2009.

Ibsen also took part in the Beach Soccer Worldwide Miami Cup in 2011.

== Coaching ==
After earning his U.S. Soccer “A” License, one of the highest levels of coaching certification in the United States, Zak Ibsen became Director of Coaching at Woodside Soccer Club: WSC Crush. He has also coached in MLS Next, a youth soccer league in the U.S.

== Personal life ==
His professional soccer career ended due to a crystal meth addiction which left him homeless living in a minivan for years. He struggled with relapse cycles for over a decade, however he eventually recovered.
