= El Salvador national beach soccer team =

Sports team representing El Salvador

El Salvador
- Nickname(s): La Selecta, La Playera, Los Pescadores, Los Guerreros, Los Cangrejitos
- Association: Federación Salvadoreña de Fútbol
- Confederation: CONCACAF (North America). (UNCAF Central America)
- Head coach: Rudis González Gallo
- Most caps: Agustín "El Tin" Ruiz
- Top scorer: Frank Velásquez
- Home stadium: Estadio de Fútbol Playa (Costa del Sol)
- FIFA code: SLV
- BSWW ranking: 13 (1 June 2026)
First colours
Second colours

First international
- El Salvador 5–9 United States (Acapulco, Mexico; 9 August 2007)

Biggest win
- El Salvador 17–2 Belize (Costa del Sol, El Salvador; 28 March 2015)

Biggest defeat
- El Salvador 2–11 Portugal (Ravenna, Italy; 1 September 2011)

World Cup
- Appearances: 5 (first in 2008)
- Best result: Fourth place (2011)

CONCACAF Beach Soccer Championship
- Appearances: 9 (first in 2008)
- Best result: Champions (2009, 2021, 2025)

The El Salvador national beach soccer team represents El Salvador in international beach soccer competitions and is controlled by the FESFUT, the governing body for football in El Salvador.

Compared to their national association football team counterparts, they are a considerable force in the sport both continently and internationally.

== History ==
The team's first qualification attempt for the Beach Soccer World Cup came in 2007, when they joined Mexico, Costa Rica and the United States in the CONCACAF Beach Soccer Championship. They failed to win a game and ultimately finished last.

In April 2008, the team again participated in the CONCACAF Beach Soccer Championship. Although they lost their opening game 4–2 to Mexico, they went on to defeat raining CONCACAF and CONMEBOL champions, the United States (5–6) and Costa Rica (3–4), to finish second in the group; this allowed them to qualify for, along with Mexico, the 2008 FIFA Beach Soccer World Cup which was held in France. Adding to the group's achievements, two of its players also picked up individual awards, with Luis Rodas being named Goalkeeper of the Tournament, and José Ruiz winning the Golden Boot for scoring the most goals (six in total).

In June 2009, the team took part at the 2009 CONCACAF Beach Soccer Championship. The team reached the final after defeating the United States in the semi-final round. They faced Costa Rica in the final who had defeated reigning champions Mexico in the other semi-final match. El Salvador, contesting their second final, defeated Costa Rica 6–3. Individual awards were given to José Portillo, who was named Goalkeeper of the Tournament, and José Ruiz, who won the Golden Boot a second time, shooting eight goals out of four matches.

== Results and fixtures ==
The following is a list of match results in the last 12 months, as well as any future matches that have been scheduled.

Legend

Win Win in penalties Lose Fixture

=== 2023 ===
8 May 2023 CONCACAF Beach Soccer Championship GS Group A	El Salvador	10–3	Turks and Caicos Islands	Malcolm Park Beach Soccer Facility, Nassau
16:30	Urbina 2', 34'; Perdomo 3', 16', 24'; Velásquez 6', 24', 31'; Ramos 12'; Rauda 17'	Report	Brooks 4'; Forbes 12'; Jerome 36'	Referee: Arian Crespo (Cuba)

9 May 2023 CONCACAF Beach Soccer Championship GS Group A	Guadeloupe	1–10	El Salvador	Malcolm Park Beach Soccer Facility, Nassau
16:30	Andre-Lubin 36'	Report	Urbina 3', 13', 28', 36'; Rauda 9', 18'; Perdomo 14', 16'; Osorio 24'; Ramos 32'	Referee: Erlis Bermúdez (Cuba)

10 May 2023 CONCACAF Beach Soccer Championship GS Group A	El Salvador	7–1	Costa Rica	Malcolm Park Beach Soccer Facility, Nassau
16:30	Urbina 4', 21'; Cruz 12'; Perdomo 15' (pen.), 24'; Velásquez 19', 33'	Report	Calero 10'	Referee: Gumercindo Batista (Panama)

12 May 2023 CONCACAF Beach Soccer Championship Quarter-finals	El Salvador	7–2	Guatemala	Malcolm Park Beach Soccer Facility, Nassau
16:30	Ramos 2', 33'; Perdomo 7', 24'; Urbina 16'; Cruz 16'; González 27'	Report	Lem 14'; Crocker 16'	Referee: Jair Robles (Mexico)

13 May 2023 CONCACAF Beach Soccer Championship Semi-finals	United States	5–2	El Salvador	Malcolm Park Beach Soccer Facility, Nassau
18:00	Perera 2', 24'; Perea 17'; Silveira 26'; Canale 30'	Report	Ramos 24'; Velásquez 32'	Referee: Gumercindo Batista (Panama)

14 May 2023 CONCACAF Beach Soccer Championship Third place	El Salvador	3–2	Bahamas	Malcolm Park Beach Soccer Facility, Nassau
18:00	Ramos 12'; Urbina 15', 18'	Report	Thompson 20'; Williams 33'	Referee: Mario Nava (Mexico)

=== 2025 ===
11 March 2025 CONCACAF Beach Soccer Championship GS Group A	El Salvador	6–1	Costa Rica	Malcolm Park Beach Soccer Facility, Nassau
14:00	Castro 4', 25'; Cerna 14', 30'; Urbina 19'; González 29' (pen.)	Report	Valencia 5'	Referee: Juan Andrés Ángeles (Dominican Republic)

12 March 2025 CONCACAF Beach Soccer Championship GS Group A	Guatemala	0–7	El Salvador	Malcolm Park Beach Soccer Facility, Nassau
14:00		Report	Ruiz 4'; Ramos 16', 25'; Castro 26'; Batres 31'; Velásquez 32'; Cerna 36'	Referee: Alexander Vetia (Cuba)

13 March 2025 CONCACAF Beach Soccer Championship GS Group A	Mexico	6–7	El Salvador	Malcolm Park Beach Soccer Facility, Nassau
16:00	Morales 23'; Maldonado 23', 29'; López 26'; García 31'; Montes de Oca 31'	Report	Castro 3'; Velásquez 4'; Cerna 5', 21'; González 21', 26'; Batres 21'	Referee: Jorge Tuñón (Panama)

15 March 2025 CONCACAF Beach Soccer Championship Semi-finals	El Salvador	1-1 (a.e.t.) (7–6 p)	United States	Malcolm Park Beach Soccer Facility, Nassau
18:00	Cerna 17'	Report	Chavez 25'	Referee: Arian Crespo (Cuba)
	Penalties
	(penalty scored) Velásquez; (penalty scored) Ramos; (penalty scored) Castro; (penalty scored) González; (penalty scored) Ruiz; (penalty scored) Cerna; (penalty scored) Robles		(penalty scored) Navas; (penalty scored) Perea; (penalty scored) Canale; (penalty scored) Carvalho; (penalty scored) Valcarcel; (penalty scored) Akol; (penalty missed) Rezende

16 March 2025 CONCACAF Beach Soccer Championship Final	El Salvador	2-1	Guatemala	Malcolm Park Beach Soccer Facility, Nassau
20:00	Robles; Najera	Report	Miguel Gonzalez

== Coaching staff ==
Source: []

Position	Name
Head coach	(El Salvador) Rudis González Gallo
Assistant coach	(El Salvador) Ramón Arturo Muñoz
Goalkeeping coach	(El Salvador) TBD
Physician	(El Salvador) Elmer Guidos
Medical Trainer	(El Salvador) Francisco Amaya Cruz
Ulitiliy	(El Salvador) Alex Geovanny Galdáme
Team manager	(El Salvador)
Press officer	(El Salvador)
Translator	(El Salvador)
Video analyst	(El Salvador)

=== Managerial history ===
- (El Salvador) Rudis González Gallo (2007–Present)

== Players ==
=== Current squad ===
The following players and staff members were called up for the 2025 FIFA Beach Soccer World Cup.

No.	Pos.	Player	Date of birth (age)	Club
1	GK	Erick Najera	17 August 1997 (aged 27)	(Salvadoran Football Federation) Barra De Santiago
2	MF	Oscar Cruz	15 May 1995 (aged 29)	(Salvadoran Football Federation) Chirilagua Futbol Club
3	DF	Heber Ramos	4 May 1990 (aged 34)	(Salvadoran Football Federation) Barra De Santiago
4	DF	Melvin Gonzalez	5 December 1997 (aged 27)	(Salvadoran Football Federation) La Pirraya FC
5	MF	Emerson Cerna	6 February 2001 (aged 24)	(Salvadoran Football Federation) Rancho Viejo
6	DF	Rogelio Rauda	31 August 1994 (aged 30)	(Salvadoran Football Federation) Barra De Santiago
7	MF	Elmer Robles	13 October 1990 (aged 34)	(Salvadoran Football Federation) Isla San Sebastian
8	FW	Andersson Castro	27 July 2000 (aged 24)	(Salvadoran Football Federation) Barra De Santiago
9	FW	Jose Batres	12 October 1991 (aged 33)	(Salvadoran Football Federation) La Pirraya FC
10	FW	Agustin Ruiz	1 December 1987 (aged 37)	(Salvadoran Football Federation) La Pirraya FC
11	FW	Frank Velasquez	12 February 1990 (aged 35)	(Salvadoran Football Federation) Barra De Santiago
12	GK	Jose Portillo	6 May 1989 (aged 35)	(Salvadoran Football Federation) Chirilagua Futbol Club

Head coach: Rudis Mauricio Gonzalez
Assistant coach: Elias Alexander Ramirez
Goalkeeping coach: Jose Alberto Lovato

== Competitive record ==
=== FIFA Beach Soccer World Cup ===
FIFA World Cup record										Qualification (CONCACAF) record (Note: In 2005 and 2007 merged qualification tournament with CONMEBOL)								
Year	Round	Pos	Pld	W	W+	L	GF	GA	GD	Round	Pos	Pld	W	W+	L	GF	GA	GD
(Brazil) 2005	did not qualify									did not enter								
(Brazil) 2006	did not qualify									did not enter								
(Brazil) 2007	did not qualify									Group stage	7th	3	0	0	3	12	19	–7
(France) 2008	Group stage	14th	3	0	0	3	6	18	−12	Runners-up	2nd	3	2	0	1	12	12	0
(United Arab Emirates) 2009	Group stage	14th	3	0	0	3	11	21	−10	Champions	1st	4	3	0	1	20	16	+4
(Italy) 2011	Fourth place	4th	6	2	1	3	21	32	−11	Runners-up	2nd	5	2	2	1	25	22	+3
(French Polynesia) 2013	Quarterfinals	6th	4	2	0	2	14	13	+1	Runners-up	2nd	5	2	1	2	27	26	+1
(Portugal) 2015	did not qualify									Third place	3rd	6	5	0	1	43	10	+33
(The Bahamas) 2017	did not qualify									Third place	3rd	6	4	1	1	35	12	+23
(Paraguay) 2019	did not qualify									Third place	3rd	6	5	0	1	42	16	+26
(Russia) 2021	Group stage	15th	3	0	0	3	14	17	–3	Champions	1st	6	6	0	0	50	12	+38
(United Arab Emirates) 2024	did not qualify									Third place	3rd	6	5	0	1	39	14	+25
(Seychelles) 2025	Group stage	13th	3	0	0	3	5	12	-7	Champions	1st	5	4	1	0	23	9	+14
Total	0 titles	5/11	19	4	1	14	66	101	–35	3 titles	11/13	55	38	5	12	328	168	+160

=== World Beach Games ===
World Beach Games record										Qualification				
Year	Round	Pos	Pld	W	W+	L	GF	GA	GD	Round	Pos	Pld	W	L
(Qatar) 2019	Group stage	9th	3	1	0	2	9	10	−1	Runners-up	2nd	3	2	1
(Indonesia) 2023	Cancelled									Runners-up	2nd	2	1	1
Total	0 titles	1/1	3	1	0	2	9	10	−1	0 titles	2/2	5	3	2

=== Central American and Caribbean Games ===
Central American and Caribbean Games record
Year	Round	Pos	Pld	W	W+	L	GF	GA	GD
(El Salvador) 2023	Runners-up	2nd	5	4	0	1	31	15	+16
Total	0 titles	0/1	5	4	0	1	31	15	+16

=== Central American and Caribbean Beach Games ===
Central American and Caribbean Beach Games record
Year	Round	Pos	Pld	W	W+	L	GF	GA	GD
(Colombia) 2022	Champions	1st	5	4	1	0	19	11	+8
Total	1 title	1/1	5	4	1	0	19	11	+8

=== Central American Games ===
Central American Games record
Year	Round	Pos	Pld	W	W+	L	GF	GA	GD
(Guatemala) 2025	Champions	1st	2	2	0	0	10	6	+4
Total	0 titles	1/1	2	2	0	0	10	6	+4
