= United States men's national beach soccer team =

United States
- Association: United States Soccer Federation
- Confederation: CONCACAF
- Head coach: Marcelo Mendes
- Captain: Alessandro Canale
- FIFA code: USA
- BSWW ranking: 17 (676.75 points) as of April, 2026
First colors
Second colors

Biggest win
- United States 14–1 Bonaire (Puerto Vallarta, Mexico; May 13, 2019)

Biggest defeat
- Portugal 14–1 United States (Espinho, Portugal; July 26, 2014)

World Cup
- Appearances: 7 (first in 2005)
- Best result: Beach Soccer World Championships (pre-FIFA era): (silver) Runners-up (1995) (bronze) Third place (1997) FIFA Beach Soccer World Cup (FIFA era): Qualified: 7 times (2005, 2006, 2007, 2013, 2019, 2021, 2024) Best: Group stage

CONCACAF Beach Soccer Championship
- Appearances: 10 (first in 2005)
- Best result: (gold) Champions (2006, 2007, 2013, 2023) (silver) Runners-up (2019, 2021) (bronze) Third place (2005, 2008, 2011, 2025)

The United States men's national beach soccer team represents the United States in international beach soccer competitions and is controlled by the United States Soccer Federation (USSF), the governing body for soccer in the United States.

The team competes regularly in international tournaments and cups including the Acapulco Beach Soccer Cup, the Paraíba World Beach Games, the El Salvador Beach Soccer Cup, the Mundialito de Clubes, the BSWW Mundialito, various regional events, and the CONCACAF Beach Soccer Championship, which serves as the primary qualifier for the FIFA Beach Soccer World Cup.

The U.S. has been a historically strong side in the region, winning the standalone CONCACAF Beach Soccer Championship in 2006, 2013, and 2023, and also claiming the title in the 2007 joint CONCACAF-CONMEBOL qualifier. They earned bronze in the 2005 joint CONCACAF-CONMEBOL event inaugural event.

As of March 2026, the team holds the No. 1 position in the CONCACAF beach soccer rankings with 4087 points, ahead of Mexico (4024) and Panama (3715).

The program traces its roots to the early professional era of international beach soccer, including hosting one of the sport's first major events in Miami. The team maintains an active schedule with frequent domestic training camps, friendlies, and competitions to stay competitive.

In recent years, the U.S. won the 2023 CONCACAF Beach Soccer Championship to qualify for the 2024 FIFA Beach Soccer World Cup, where they exited the group stage.

At the 2025 CONCACAF Championship (March 11–16), they reached the semifinals but lost to El Salvador 7–6 on penalties after a 1–1 draw, then secured third place with a 6–2 victory over the Bahamas. This result meant they did not qualify for the 2025 FIFA Beach Soccer World Cup (held in Seychelles), won by El Salvador and Guatemala qualifying instead.

The team is currently led by head coach Marcelo Mendes, appointed in December 2025 as the program's first full-time coach.

== History ==
=== Early years ===
The sport of beach soccer is said to have originated in Brazil, where locals played soccer on the beaches for recreation. In 1992, the founding fathers of Beach Soccer Worldwide created the official rules for the sport. Then in 1993, the United States held the first ever professional beach soccer event in Miami, Florida which included national teams from Brazil, Argentina, and Italy. This event led to the creation of more teams in other countries, rapidly growing the sport.

=== Mundialito de Futebol de Praia ===
The United States achieved one of their notable early international successes by winning the 1998 Mundialito de Futebol de Praia (Beach Soccer Mundialito), held in Figueira da Foz, Portugal. In the tournament, the U.S. topped their group with three wins (including strong performances against teams like Italy and Canada), defeated Brazil 3–2 in the semifinals, and claimed the title with an 8–2 victory over Peru in the final.

=== Beach Soccer World Championship (Pre-FIFA) ===
The United States participated in the inaugural Beach Soccer World Championship in Brazil in 1994, marking the start of their competitive journey. The U.S. team competed consistently in the tournament from 1994 to 2001, achieving a runners-up in 1995, fourth place in 1996, and third-place finish in 1997. The U.S. team joined FIFA once the World Championship was officially recognized by the association.

=== CONCACAF Beach Soccer Championship ===
CONCACAF, the governing body for football in North America, Central America, and the Caribbean, began hosting qualifying tournaments for the FIFA Beach Soccer World Cup in 2005. The inaugural event, the 2005 CONCACAF and CONMEBOL Beach Soccer Championship, was a joint tournament with CONMEBOL held in Rio de Janeiro, Brazil, where the United States national beach soccer team secured third place by defeating Argentina in the third-place playoff. In 2006, CONCACAF held its first standalone Beach Soccer Championship in Puntarenas, Costa Rica, which the U.S. won (Ben Astorga set a tournament record by scoring just four seconds into a match against Canada where they ended up winning in the final. In 2007, another joint CONCACAF and CONMEBOL Championship took place in Acapulco, Mexico, with the U.S. winning the title by defeating Uruguay 4-3 in the final.

From 2008, CONCACAF hosted standalone championships. The U.S. placed third in 2008, fourth in 2009, and third in 2010. After a three-year hiatus, the tournament resumed in 2013 in Nassau, Bahamas, with the U.S. emerging as champions, defeating El Salvador 5-4 in overtime. The championship continued biennially, with the U.S. finishing fourth in 2015, fifth in 2017, second in both 2019 and 2021, first in 2023, and third in 2025, defeating the Bahamas in the third-place match but failing to qualify for the FIFA Beach Soccer World Cup.

=== FIFA Beach Soccer World Cup ===
The sport of beach soccer, and the United States national beach soccer team, became a recognized part of FIFA – the main international governing body of soccer – in 2005, in which CONCACAF – the Confederation of North & Central America and Caribbean Association Football – became the officiating body for qualifying tournaments.

The U.S. national beach soccer team went on to compete in FIFA Beach Soccer World Cup tournaments from 2005 through 2013 against some of the 98 total national teams from all around the world. The U.S. has competed in all CONCACAF tournaments since their inception, achieving three titles (2006, 2013, 2023) and qualifying for the FIFA Beach Soccer World Cup seven times: 2005, 2006, 2007, 2013, 2019, 2021, and 2024.

In 2005, the U.S. team made it to the World Cup in Brazil. In the group stages, they were unable to win either of their games, resulting in them not making it through to the playoffs.

In 2006, the men's national team won the CONCACAF Beach Soccer Championship and qualified for the FIFA World Cup, which was held in Brazil. Due to them only winning one game in the group stages, they did not qualify for the playoffs.

In 2007, the team made it to the FIFA World Cup in Brazil again. They ended up losing in the group stages and were unable to make it through to the playoffs.

In 2008, 2009, and 2010, the U.S. team fell in the semifinals of the CONCACAF Beach Soccer Championships and did not qualify for the World Cup. The FIFA Beach Soccer World Cup changed to being held every other year, meaning the next opportunity for the U.S. to qualify would be in 2013.

In 2013, the men's national beach soccer team won the CONCACAF Beach Soccer Championship and qualified for the World Cup which was held in Tahiti. They did not make it through the group stages and were out before the playoffs.

Anthony Chimienti is the U.S. all-time leading goal scorer in World Cup play with 9 goals, participating in 3 World Cups.

At the 2015 CONCACAF Beach Soccer Championship, the U.S. lost in the semifinals and did not qualify for the World Cup. In 2017, they lost in the quarterfinals and once again did not qualify for the World Cup.

At the 2019 CONCACAF Beach Soccer Championship, the U.S. lost in the finals, but their 2nd-place finish qualified them for the 2019 FIFA Beach Soccer World Cup.

In 2023, the U.S. National Team managed getting first at the 2023 CONCACAF Beach Soccer Championship, qualifying them for the 2024 FIFA Beach Soccer World Cup, with their top scorer at the World Cup being Alessandro Canale. They fell short, not making past the group stage.

== Coaching staff ==
Coaching Staff 2025
Position	Name
Head coach	(United States) Marcelo Mendes
Assistant coach	(United States) Ryan Futagaki
Assistant coach	(United States) Nick Perera
Strength and conditioning coach	(United States) Daniel Wartner

In December 2025, Marcelo Mendes was appointed as the program’s first full-time head coach. Mendes, who previously led the beach soccer national teams of the United Arab Emirates, Japan and China PR, took charge as the team began preparations for the 2027 FIFA Beach Soccer World Cup cycle.

Ian Carry previously served as head coach of the team after taking over from Francis Farberoff.

=== Former head coaches ===
- Phillip Gyau – 1998–2002
- Roberto Ceciliano – 1999–2008
- Eddie Soto – 2009–2019
- Francis Farberoff – 2020–July 2024
- Ian Carry – 2024–December 2025

=== Former assistant coaches ===
- Chris Antonopoulos – Assistant coach, 2005–2006
- Tighe O’Sullivan – Assistant coach, 2006–2009
- Francis Farberoff – Assistant coach, 2014–2020
- Ben Astorga – Assistant coach, 2021–2024
- Morgan Church – Assistant coach, 2021–?

== Players ==
=== 2024 squad ===
The following 12 players were named to the roster for the 2024 FIFA Beach Soccer World Cup.

Note: Flags indicate national team as defined under FIFA eligibility rules; some limited exceptions apply. Players may hold more than one non-FIFA nationality.

No.	Pos.	Nation	Player
1	GK	USA	Chris Toth
12	GK	USA	Austin Collier
3	DF	USA	Antonio Chavez
5	DF	USA	Nico Perea
6	DF	USA	Cody Valcarcel
2	MF	USA	Tanner Akol

No.	Pos.	Nation	Player
4	MF	USA	Ricardo Carvalho
11	MF	USA	Chris Albiston
7	MF	USA	Andres Navas
8	FW	USA	Conner Rezende
9	FW	USA	Alessandro Canale
10	FW	USA	Gabriel Silveira

=== 2026 squad ===
The following is the recent training camp roster. Note: Flags indicate national team as defined under FIFA eligibility rules; some limited exceptions apply. Players may hold more than one non-FIFA nationality.

No.	Pos.	Nation	Player
—	GK	USA	Austin Collier
—	GK	USA	Andres Diaz
—	GK	USA	Brian Shushkovsky
—	DF	USA	Antonio Chavez
—	DF	USA	Matthew Citron
—	DF	USA	Nico Perea

No.	Pos.	Nation	Player
—	MF	USA	Tanner Akol
—	MF	USA	Andres Navas
—	MF	USA	Justin Trout
—	MF	USA	Sasha Karlov
—	MF	USA	Alvaro Franco
—	MF	USA	Fredo Dilbert
—	FW	USA	Alessandro Canale
—	FW	USA	Gabe Silveira

== Competitive record ==
=== BSWW Beach Soccer World Championships ===
Beach Soccer World Championships Record
Year	Location	Round	Pos	pld	W	W+	L	GF	GA	GD
1995	(Brazil) Rio de Janeiro	Runners-up (Final)	2nd	5	4	0	1	16	15	+41
1996	(Brazil) Rio de Janeiro	Fourth place	4th	5	3	0	2	17	20	-3
1997	(Brazil) Rio de Janeiro	Third place	3rd	5	3	0	2	21	16	+5
1998	(Brazil) Rio de Janeiro	Group Stage	7th	4	2	0	2	13	14	-1
1999	(Brazil) Rio de Janeiro	Group Stage	6th	3	1	0	2	14	12	+2
2000	(Brazil) Rio de Janeiro	Group Stage	7th	3	1	0	2	14	17	−3
2001	(Brazil) Costa do Sauípe	Quarter finals	5th	3	1	0	2	6	9	−3
2002	(Brazil) Vitória / Guarujá	Did not participate								
2003	(Brazil) Rio de Janeiro	Group Stage	8th	3	0	0	3	8	26	−18
2004	(Brazil) Rio de Janeiro	Group Stage	10th	2	0	0	2	2	8	−6
Total		0 titles	9/10	33	15	0	18	111	137	-26

=== FIFA Beach Soccer World Cup ===
FIFA World Cup Record									
Year	Round	Pos	Pld	W	W+	L	GF	GA	GD
(Brazil) 2005	Group Stage	10th	2	0	0	2	5	12	–7
(Brazil) 2006	Group Stage	12th	3	1	0	2	14	20	–6
(Brazil) 2007	Group Stage	13th	3	1	0	2	16	20	-4
(France) 2008	Did Not Qualify								
(United Arab Emirates) 2009	Did Not Qualify								
(Italy) 2011	Did Not Qualify								
(French Polynesia) 2013	Group Stage	10th	3	1	0	2	13	14	–1
(Portugal) 2015	Did Not Qualify								
(The Bahamas) 2017	Did Not Qualify								
(Paraguay) 2019	Group Stage	14th	3	0	0	3	10	17	–7
(Russia) 2021	Group Stage	16th	3	0	0	3	11	18	–7
(United Arab Emirates) 2024	Group Stage	14th	3	0	0	3	7	11	–4
(Seychelles) 2025	Did Not Qualify								
Total	0 titles	7/13	20	3	0	17	76	110	–34

=== CONCACAF Beach Soccer Championship ===
CONCACAF Beach Soccer Championship Record
Year	Round	Position	Pld	W	W+	L	GF	GA	GD
(Costa Rica) 2006	Champions	1st	4	3	0	1	17	10	+7
(Mexico) 2008	Third place	3rd	3	1	0	2	13	10	+3
(Mexico) 2009	Fourth place	4th	4	2	0	2	19	13	+6
(Mexico) 2010	Third place	3rd	5	3	1	1	23	14	+9
(The Bahamas) 2013	Champions	1st	5	4	1	0	28	11	+17
(El Salvador) 2015	Fourth place	4th	6	4	0	2	26	18	+8
(The Bahamas) 2017	Quarterfinals	5th	6	5	0	1	34	14	+20
(Mexico) 2019	Runners-up	2nd	6	4	1	1	38	15	+23
(Costa Rica) 2021	Runners-up	2nd	6	4	0	2	33	19	+14
(The Bahamas) 2023	Champions	1st	6	6	0	0	37	10	+16
(The Bahamas) 2025	Third place	3rd	6	2	1	3	27	15	+12
Total	3 titles	10/10	51	36	3	12	268	134	+123

=== CONCACAF / CONMEBOL Beach Soccer Championships ===
CONCACAF / CONMEBOL Beach Soccer Championships Record
Year	Round	Pos	Pld	W	L	GF	GA	GD
(Brazil) 2005	Third	3rd	3	2	1	14	16	−2
(Mexico) 2007	Winner	1st	3	3	0	19	12	+7
Totals	1 title	2/2	6	5	1	33	28	+5

== Notable players and all-time greats ==
- Francis Farberoff (c. 2000–2014) — Brazilian born defender, longtime captain (2003–2014), over 100 caps, key figure in early 2000s era including multiple World Cup qualifications; later became head coach.
- Benyam Astorga (Benny Astorga) (2002–2012) — Veteran contributor in early development eras; involved in CONCACAF and international play.
- Alessandro Canale (2013–) — Forward with over 100 caps and 70+ goals; three-time World Cup veteran, tied for most World Cup goals (9), standout in 2024 qualifiers and tournament.
- Chris Toth (2013–) — Goalkeeper, 100 caps; three-time World Cup participant.
- Nick Perera (2012–) — Forward and former captain; all-time leading scorer with 114 goals in 94 caps, multiple CONCACAF top scorer awards, key in 2013–2023 era including World Cup goals.
- Eddie Soto (1998–2007) — Forward from early professional beach era; won 1998 Mundialito de Futebol de Praia in Portugal, contributed to mid-2000s CONCACAF dominance and World Cup appearances.
- Chris Antonopoulos (2002–2006) — National team goalkeeper and assistant coach 2005 & 2006 CONCACAF for 2005 and 2006 FIFA World Cup qualifications.
- Anthony Chimienti (2006–2010) — Forward, U.S. all-time leading goal scorer in FIFA Beach Soccer World Cup play (9 goals across 3 tournaments).
- Stuart Holden (2009–2013) —Scotland-born midfielder; transitioned from successful outdoor career (25 USMNT caps, 2 MLS titles) to early beach national team contributions.
- Zak Ibsen (2006–2010) — Defender with 22 caps and 9 goals; dual USMNT/beach rep; scored in 2006 CONCACAF title win debut, part of 2006 & 2007 World Cups.
- Michael McAndrews (2010–2014) — Goalkeeper with 31 caps; represented USA at 2013 FIFA Beach Soccer World Cup, key in 6-4 win over UAE and 2013 CONCACAF title.
- Luis Montanez (2006–2010) — Goalkeeper with 26 caps; part of 2006 & 2007 FIFA Beach Soccer World Cups (first two US victories), record 6 World Cup games by US beach GK, multiple CONCACAF titles including first shutout.
- Betto Lima (Alberto "Betto" Lima) (late 90s, early 2000s) — Brazilian born forward, won 1998 Mundialito de Futebol de Praia in Portugal.

Other notable mentions from various eras include Antonio Chavez, Oscar Gil, Nico Perea, Tanner Akol, Gabe Silveira, Ricardo Carvalho, Fredo Dilbert, and Chris Albiston.
