= Seattle Sounders FC (beach soccer) =

Former American beach soccer team

- Full name: Seattle Sounders FC
- Short name: Seattle Sounders
- Coach: Marcelo Mendes
Home colors
Away colors
Third colors

Seattle Sounders FC was a professional beach soccer team based in United States. They were affiliated with Seattle Sounders FC, a Major League Soccer team, and competed in the 2011 and 2012 Mundialito de Clubes, an international beach soccer competition for clubs. Brazilian coach Marcelo Mendes was the head coach for the team at both tournaments; the rosters were formed from a special draft held in São Paulo.

== Mundialito de Clubes 2012 squad ==
Note: Flags indicate national team as defined under FIFA eligibility rules; some limited exceptions apply. Players may hold more than one non-FIFA nationality.

No.	Pos.	Nation	Player
—	GK	USA	Michael McAndrews
—	DF	USA	Nicky
—	DF	UAE	Ali Karim
—	DF	MEX	Francisco Cati
—	MF	BRA	Oscar Gil

No.	Pos.	Nation	Player
—	MF	USA	Francis Farberoff
—	MF	MEX	Morgan Plata
—	FW	SLV	Agustín Ruiz
—	FW	BRA	Osmar Moreira
—	GK	BRA	César Esteves

Coach: Marcelo Mendes

== Honors ==
=== International competitions ===
- Mundialito de Clubes

- Group Stage: 2012
- Quarter Final: 2011
