= Marcelo Mendes (beach soccer) =

Brazilian beach soccer coach (born 1970)

Personal information
- Full name: Marcelo Silveira Mendes
- Date of birth: 23 January 1970 (age 56)
- Place of birth: Rio de Janeiro, Brazil

Team information
- Current team: United States (head coach)

Managerial career
- Years: Team
- 1998: Universidade Gama Filho (women's football)
- 1998–1999: Flamengo (women's)
- 1999–2000: Portugal
- 2000: Fluminense (beach soccer)
- 2000: São Paulo (beach soccer)
- 2001: Rio de Janeiro (beach soccer)
- 2001: Vasco da Gama (beach soccer)
- 2001: United States
- 2002: Trinidad and Tobago
- 2002–2005: São Paulo (beach soccer)
- 2003: Portugal
- 2003–2004: Bonsucesso (U-20/U-15)
- 2005: Madureira
- 2005: Thailand
- 2005–2006: Uruguay
- 2006: South Africa
- 2007–2013: United Arab Emirates
- 2011–2012: Seattle Sounders (beach soccer)
- 2013: Al Ahli (beach soccer)
- 2014–2017: Japan
- 2018: Kuwait
- 2018: FC City (technical consultant)
- 2018–2019: Thailand
- 2020–2021: Sampaio Corrêa (beach soccer)
- 2020–2022: Uruguay
- 2021: FC Ryukyu BS
- 2022–2025: China
- 2023: Portugal (assistant)
- 2024: Corinthians (beach soccer)
- 2025–: United States
Medal record
Men's Beach Soccer
Representing United Arab Emirates
AFC Beach Soccer Asian Cup
Gold medal – first place	2007 Dubai	Manager
Gold medal – first place	2008 Dubai	Manager
Representing Japan
Asian Beach Games
Silver medal – second place	2014 Phuket	Manager

Marcelo Silveira Mendes (born 23 January 1970) is a Brazilian beach soccer coach. He is the head coach of the United States Men's National Beach Soccer Team.

Mendes is one of the most travelled coaches in beach soccer history, having managed senior national teams in Europe (Portugal), Asia (UAE, Japan, Kuwait, Thailand, and China), South America (Uruguay), North America (United States), the Caribbean (Trinidad and Tobago), and Africa (South Africa).

Beyond his extensive national team resume, he has commanded top-tier beach soccer clubs globally, including Fluminense, São Paulo, Vasco da Gama, Sampaio Corrêa, and Corinthians in Brazil; Catania in Italy; FC City in Russia; Al Ahli in the United Arab Emirates; and the Seattle Sounders and FC Ryukyu BS in the United States and Japan respectively.

== Early life and education ==
Marcelo Silveira Mendes was born on 23 January 1970 in Rio de Janeiro, Brazil.

Growing up in Rio de Janeiro, he did not follow the traditional path of playing for youth grassroots clubs or professional football academies. Instead, he pursued the sport from an academic and scientific perspective, enrolling at the Universidade Gama Filho in Rio de Janeiro to study physical education, sports science, and tactical coaching theory. He graduated with his degree in sports training and he transitioned directly into professional sports management as a tactician.

== Coaching career ==
Unlike many of his peers in the sport, Mendes never played beach soccer competitively, having studied physical education and tactical management instead.

He began his coaching career at his alma mater in standard grass-field women's football with Universidade Gama Filho (1998) and Flamengo (1998–1999) before transitioning permanently to the sand circuit as a tactician and physical instructor. He took charge of the Portugal national team in 1999–2000 and returned briefly in 2003.

In 2000, Mendes led Fluminense to the Rio de Janeiro State Championship title. He also coached São Paulo (2000, 2002–2005), the Rio de Janeiro state select team (Seleção Carioca) (2001), and Vasco da Gama (2001), while serving as head coach for the United States (2001) and Trinidad and Tobago (2002).

Mendes worked in youth development with Bonsucesso U-20 and U-15 teams (2003–2004) and coached Madureira (2005) serving as a tactical/fitness coach for their professional 11v11 grass-field football team. He guided Thailand (2005) guiding them through the inaugural 2005 FIFA Beach Soccer World Cup before moving on to manage Uruguay (2005–2006) and South Africa (2006).

Mendes was appointed head coach of the United Arab Emirates in 2007. Under his leadership, the UAE won the AFC Beach Soccer Championship in 2007 and 2008, and qualified for four consecutive FIFA Beach Soccer World Cups (2007, 2008, 2009, 2013). He coached the Seattle Sounders beach soccer team (2011–2012) through the Mundialito de Clubes (the Club World Cup of Beach Soccer) which included USA national team players. He also coached the Emirati club side Al Ahli in the same tournament in 2013.

He led Japan from 2014 to 2017, reaching the quarter-finals of the 2015 FIFA Beach Soccer World Cup and finishing second at the 2014 Asian Beach Games. Following his departure from Japan, Mendes oversaw a developmental training camp program with the Kuwait national team in early 2018 and joined FC City in Saint Petersburg, Russia, to act as a technical consultant during the Russian beach soccer championship.

Mendes subsequently coached Thailand (2018–2019) at the 2019 AFC Beach Soccer Championship. He returned to South America to work with Brazilian club Sampaio Corrêa from 2020 to 2021 and managed Uruguay (2020–2022). In 2021, he also took charge of Japanese club FC Ryukyu BS.

He went to Europe to coach Catania Beach Soccer in Italy for the 2022 season, leading them to a Supercoppa Italiana victory. He served as an assistant for Portugal (2023) and coached China (2022–2025) leading them through the 2023 AFC Beach Soccer Asian Cup, where the team exited during the group stage. Mendes also managed Corinthians beach soccer team (2024), winning the Campeonato Paulista de Beach Soccer.

In December 2025, U.S. Soccer appointed Mendes as the head coach of the United States, succeeding Ian Carry. Mendes Is the first full-time head coach in the 20-year history of the team.

Mendes managed his first official matches Copa das Nações de Beach Soccer tournament at the 2026 Paraiba World Beach Games in João Pessoa, Brazil, in March 2026 the team lost 8–6 to Brazil and 3–1 to Japan losing in the group stage. The following month, he secured his first victory as U.S. manager during the 2026 Acapulco Beach Soccer Cup, leading the United States to a 6–5 comeback win against regional rivals Mexico en route to a third-place tournament finish.

Mendes managed the U.S. in the teams first home game in a decade against Trinidad and Tobago on June 21, 2026, in Venice Beach, California, which resulted in a 5–3 defeat.

== Coaching Philosophy ==
During his seven-year tenure in the UAE, he heavily altered his physical training methodologies to accommodate local customs, restructuring his training sessions around daily prayer times and modifying regimens during Ramadan to account for player fasting. He has described his pre-match dressing room philosophy as one focused on calm and confidence rather than high intensity, frequently encouraging players to pray according to their respective faiths before taking the field.

== Personal life ==
Mendes is fluent in Portuguese, Spanish, and English.

Mendes has two daughters.

== Honors ==
Fluminens
- Rio de Janeiro State Championship (beach soccer): 2000

United Arab Emirates

- AFC Beach Soccer Championship: 2007, 2008

Catania

- Supercoppa Italiana: 2022

Corinthians

- AFC Beach Soccer Championship: 2007, 2008
- Campeonato Paulista de Beach Soccer: 2024

Japan

- Asian Beach Games: 2014 (silver)
