= Bonaire national beach soccer team =

- Association: Bonaire Football Federation (FFB)
- Confederation: CONCACAF
- Head coach: Hubert Cicilia
- BSWW ranking: 23

Biggest defeat
- United States 14–1 Bonaire (Puerto Vallarta, Mexico; May 13, 2019)

Bonaire men's national beach soccer team represents Bonaire in international beach soccer competitions. The team is controlled by the Bonaire Football Federation and competes in CONCACAF events, including the CONCACAF Beach Soccer Championship. The team debuted in 2019, but went winless in the tournament suffering a 14-1 loss to the United States. Bonaire also suffered a 12-2 loss to Bahamas in 2019. Bonaire is ranked 23 in BSWW as of 2024.

== Lineup ==
Bonaire national beach soccer team squad (as of 2019)
No.	Player	Position
1	Andrew Wout	Goalkeeper
2	Edson Stint	Player
7	Elionard Janga	Player
9	Giandro Steba	Player
10	Cristian Zuniga	Player
Substitutes
12	Ruviano Josephia	Player
3	Alsy Anthony	Player
4	Gilbertson Piard	Player
5	Felix Raydolf	Player
6	Clifford Martis	Player
8	Ruvelio Josephia	Player
11	Henrich Beaumont	Player
Head coach: Hubert Cicilia
