= CONCACAF Beach Soccer Championship =

Main championship for beach soccer in North America, Central America and the Caribbean

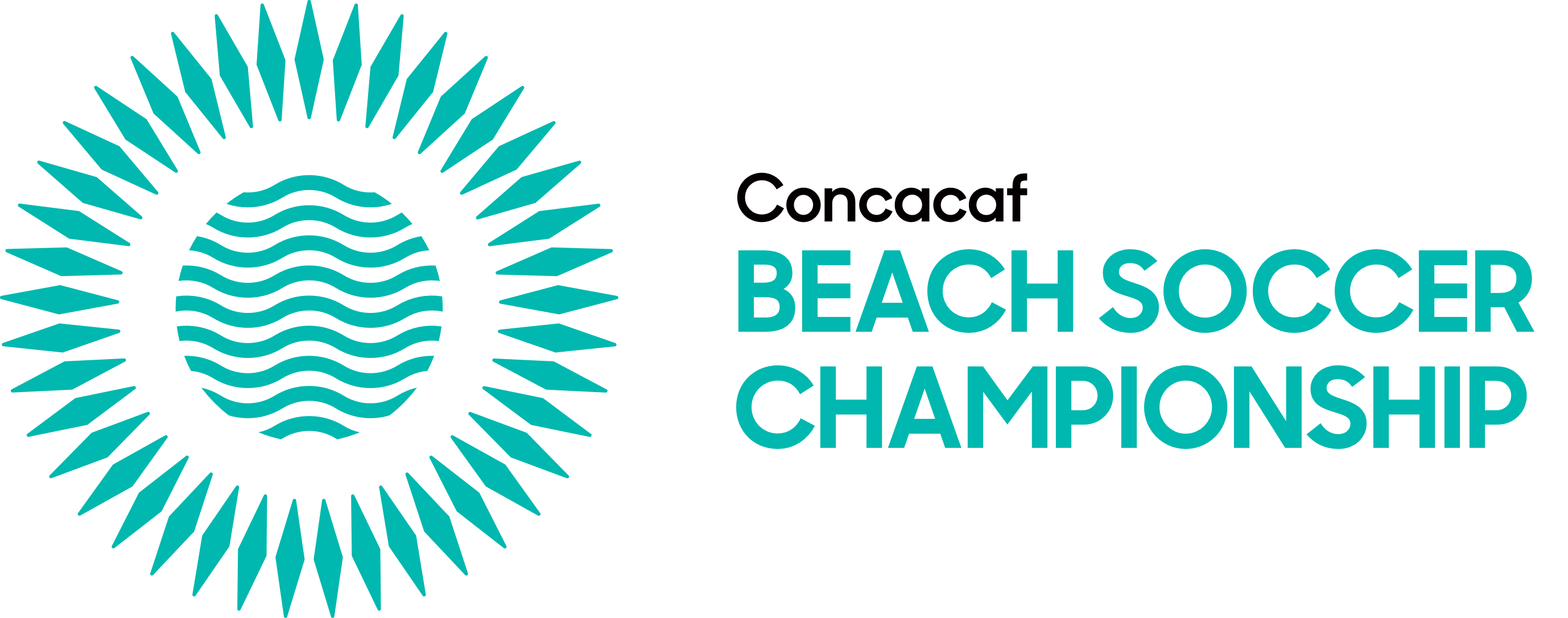
- Organizer(s): CONCACAF
- Founded: 2006; 20 years ago
- Region: North America, Central America and the Caribbean
- Teams: 8–16
- Qualifier for: FIFA Beach Soccer World Cup
- Current champion: El Salvador (3rd title)
- Most championships: Mexico (4 titles)
- Website: concacaf.com
- 2025 CONCACAF Beach Soccer Championship

The CONCACAF Beach Soccer Championship is the main championship for beach soccer in North America, Central America and the Caribbean, contested between senior men's national teams of the members of CONCACAF. It is the sport's version of the better known CONCACAF Gold Cup in association football. North America's governing body for football, CONCACAF, organize the championship, with cooperation from Beach Soccer Worldwide (BSWW).

The winners of the championship are crowned continental champions; the tournament also acts as the qualification route for North American nations to the upcoming edition of the FIFA Beach Soccer World Cup and is therefore also known as the FIFA Beach Soccer World Cup CONCACAF qualifier. Coinciding with the annual staging of the World Cup, the competition took place yearly until 2010; the World Cup then became biennial, and as its supplementary qualification event, the championship followed suit.

The championship was established in 2006 after FIFA made it a requirement for all confederations to begin holding qualification tournaments to determine the best national team(s) in their region and hence those who would proceed to represent their continent in the upcoming World Cup (previously, nations were simply invited to play without having to earn their place). The first edition was preceded by a joint qualification tournament with CONMEBOL in 2005; a second and final joint event was held in 2007. FIFA currently allocate North America two berths at the World Cup and hence the top two teams (the winners and the runners-up) qualify to the World Cup finals.

Mexico are the most successful nation with four titles. They are followed by El Salvador (current champions) and the United States with three titles each, and Panama with one.

== Results ==
- Joint championship with CONMEBOL

There have been eleven editions of the championship as of 2025. For all tournaments, the top two teams qualified for the FIFA Beach Soccer World Cup.

In terms of qualification to the World Cup, Mexico and the United States have achieved the most, placing well enough in the championship to advance to the World Cup finals on seven occasions each. Along with El Salvador and Costa Rica, these four are the only nations to qualify to the World Cup more than once thus far.

Year	Location	Final			Third place match		
Year	Location	Champions	Score	Runners-up	Third Place	Score	Fourth Place
2005	Qualifying tournament held jointly with CONMEBOL; see 2005 Americas Beach Soccer Championship						
2006 details	Puntarenas, Costa Rica	United States	^{[round-robin]}	Canada	Costa Rica	^{[round-robin]}	Mexico
2007	Qualifying tournament held jointly with CONMEBOL; see 2007 CONCACAF and CONMEBOL Beach Soccer Championship						
2008 details	Puerto Vallarta, Mexico	Mexico	^{[round-robin]}	El Salvador	United States	^{[round-robin]}	Costa Rica
2009 details	Puerto Vallarta, Mexico	El Salvador	6–3	Costa Rica	Mexico	5–4	United States
2010 details	Puerto Vallarta, Mexico	Mexico	5–3	El Salvador	United States	7–5	Costa Rica
2013 details	(The Bahamas) Nassau, Bahamas	United States	5–4 (a.e.t.)	El Salvador	Mexico	8–7	Costa Rica
2015 details	Costa del Sol, El Salvador	Mexico	4–0	Costa Rica	El Salvador	5–2	United States
2017 details	(The Bahamas) Nassau, Bahamas	Panama	4–2	Mexico	El Salvador	7–2	Guadeloupe
2019 details	Puerto Vallarta, Mexico	Mexico	6–2	United States	El Salvador	8–3	Panama
2021 details	Alajuela, Costa Rica	El Salvador	6–4	United States	Guatemala	5–2	Mexico
2023 details	(The Bahamas) Nassau, Bahamas	United States	5–0	Mexico	El Salvador	3–2	Bahamas
2025 details	(The Bahamas) Nassau, Bahamas	El Salvador	2–1	Guatemala	United States	6–2	Bahamas

Round-robin Indicates this edition was played as a round-robin tournament. There was no final or third place match.

== Performance ==
=== Successful nations ===
Team	Titles	Runners-up	Third place	Fourth place	Total top 4
Mexico^{[a]}	4 (2008*, 2011*, 2015, 2019*)	2 (2017, 2023)	2 (2009*, 2013)	2 (2006, 2021)	10
El Salvador	3 (2009, 2021, 2025)	3 (2008, 2011, 2013)	4 (2015*, 2017, 2019, 2023)	–	10
United States^{[b]}	3 (2006, 2013, 2023)	2 (2019, 2021)	3 (2008, 2011, 2025)	2 (2009, 2015)	10
Panama	1 (2017)	–	–	1 (2019)	2
Costa Rica	–	2 (2009, 2015)	1 (2006*)	3 (2008, 2011, 2013)	6
Guatemala	–	1 (2025)	1 (2021)	–	2
Canada	–	1 (2006)	–	–	1
Bahamas	–	–	–	2 (2023*, 2025*)	1
Guadeloupe	–	–	–	1 (2017)	1

* Hosts
a. Also fourth in 2007 joint event.
b. Also third in 2005 joint event; winner of 2007 joint event.

=== Awards ===
Year	Top goalscorer(s)	Gls	Best player	Best goalkeeper	Fair play	Best young player	Ref.
(Costa Rica) 2006	(Mexico) Ricardo Villalobos	7	(United States) Francis Farberoff	(Canada) Jim Larkin	Canada	not awarded	
(Mexico) 2008	(El Salvador) Agustín Ruiz	6	(Mexico) Ricardo Villalobos	(El Salvador) Luis Rodas	not awarded	not awarded	
(Mexico) 2009	(El Salvador) Agustín Ruiz	8	(Costa Rica) Richard Sterling	(El Salvador) José Portillo	not awarded	not awarded	
(Mexico) 2010	(El Salvador) Frank Velásquez	12	(El Salvador) Frank Velásquez	(Mexico) Miguel Estrada	not awarded	not awarded	
(The Bahamas) 2013	(United States) Nicolas Perera	11	(El Salvador) Agustín Ruiz	(United States) Christopher Toth	not awarded	not awarded	
(El Salvador) 2015	(El Salvador) Frank Velásquez	15	(Mexico) Ramón Maldonado	(Mexico) Miguel Estrada	not awarded	not awarded	
(The Bahamas) 2017	(Belize) Marlon Meza (Mexico) Ramón Maldonado	12	(Panama) Alfonso Maquensi	(Mexico) Diego Villaseñor	Canada	(Guyana) Jamal Haynes	
(Mexico) 2019	(United States) Nicolas Perera	13	(Mexico) Benjamín Mosco	(Mexico) Diego Villaseñor	Panama	(El Salvador) Exon Perdomo	
(Costa Rica) 2021	(El Salvador) Frank Velásquez	11	(El Salvador) Rubén Batres	(El Salvador) Eliodoro Portillo	Mexico	(United States) Antonio Chávez	
(The Bahamas) 2023	(El Salvador) Jason Urbina	11	(United States) Nicolas Perera	(Mexico) Gabriel Macías	Bahamas	not awarded	
(The Bahamas) 2025	(El Salvador) Emerson Cerna	6	(El Salvador) Emerson Cerna	(El Salvador) Eliodoro Portillo	El Salvador	(The Bahamas) Wood Julmis	

=== All-time top goalscorers ===
As of 2025

The following table shows the all-time top 20 goalscorers.

Rank	Player	Team	Goals
1	Frank Velásquez	El Salvador	64
2	Agustín Ruiz	El Salvador	52
3	Nicolas Perera	United States	49
4	Lesly St. Fleur	Bahamas	44
5	Greivin Pacheco	Costa Rica	41
6	Rubén Batres	El Salvador	33
7	Ramón Maldonado	Mexico	29
8	Alessandro Canale	United States	27
9	Exon Perdomo	El Salvador	26
9	Kevon Woodley	Trinidad and Tobago	26
11	Rohan Reid	Jamaica	25
12	Alfonso Maquensi	Panama	23
13	Miguel González	Guatemala	21
14	Heber Ramos	El Salvador	20
15	Elmer Robles	El Salvador	19
15	Ricardo Villalobos	Mexico	19
17	Gabriel Silveira	United States	18
17	Marlon Meza	Belize	18
17	Ángel Rodríguez	Mexico	18
17	Anthony Chimienti	United States	18

2006, 2008, 2009, 2010, 2013, 2015, 2017, 2019, 2021–2023: CONCACAF match reports.

=== All-time table ===
As of 2025

Joint event results not included.

Pos	Team	App	Pld	W	W+	WP	L	GF	GA	GD	Pts	PPG	Win % (W−L)
1	United States	11	57	38	2	2	15	284	143	141	120	2.11	73.7 (42−15)
2	El Salvador	10	52	37	1	5	9	316	149	167	118	2.27	82.7 (43−9)
3	Mexico	11	52	38	1	1	12	247	131	116	117	2.25	76.9 (40−12)
4	Costa Rica	11	46	19	2	3	22	192	185	7	64	1.39	52.2 (24−22)
5	Bahamas	9	41	15	1	1	24	160	162	−2	48	1.17	41.5 (17−24)
6	Guatemala	7	32	14	0	2	16	129	123	6	44	1.38	50.0 (16−16)
7	Panama	6	25	12	0	3	10	106	81	25	39	1.56	60.0 (15−10)
8	Trinidad and Tobago	7	31	13	0	0	18	112	113	−1	39	1.26	41.9 (13−18)
9	Canada	5	20	8	0	0	12	73	97	−24	24	1.20	40.0 (8−12)
10	Guadeloupe	4	16	5	0	1	10	53	93	−40	16	1.00	37.5 (6−10)
11	Antigua and Barbuda	3	12	4	0	0	8	38	55	−17	12	1.00	33.3 (4−8)
12	Belize	5	17	3	1	1	12	53	92	−39	12	0.71	29.4 (5−12)
13	Jamaica	6	26	4	0	0	22	96	145	−49	12	0.46	15.4 (4−22)
14	Guyana	2	9	3	0	0	6	32	41	−9	9	1.00	33.3 (3−6)
15	Barbados	2	9	2	0	0	7	32	54	−22	6	0.67	22.2 (2−7)
16	Turks and Caicos Islands	5	18	2	0	0	16	50	131	−81	6	0.33	11.1 (2−16)
17	U.S. Virgin Islands	3	12	1	0	0	11	27	91	−64	3	0.25	8.3 (1−11)
18	Bonaire	1	3	0	0	0	3	7	35	−28	0	0.00	0.0 (0−3)
19	Puerto Rico	2	7	0	0	0	7	10	49	−39	0	0.00	0.0 (0−7)
20	Dominican Republic	2	6	0	0	0	6	8	57	−49	0	0.00	0.0 (0−6)

Key: Appearances App / Won in normal time W = 3 points / Won in extra-time W+ = 2 points / Won on penalty shoot-out WP = 1 point / Lost L = 0 points / Points per game PPG

=== Appearances and performance timeline ===
The following is a performance timeline of the teams who have appeared in the CONCACAF Beach Soccer Championship and how many appearances they each have made.

Legend

- 1st – Champions
- 2nd – Runners-up
- 3rd – Third place
- 4th – Fourth place
- 5th–16th – Fifth to sixteenth place^{[‡]}
- QF – Quarter-finals
- R1 – Round 1 (group stage)
- × – Did not enter
- •• – Entered but withdrew
- DQ – Disqualified
- – Hosts
- Apps – No. of appearances

‡. In some years, teams knocked-out at round 1 or the quarter-finals played no further matches (these results are marked as R1 or QF).
In other years, classification matches were then played to determine all final placements.

Timeline

Year Team	2006 (Costa Rica) (5)	2008 (Mexico) (4)	2009 (Mexico) (6)	2010 (Mexico) (8)	2013 (The Bahamas) (10)	2015 (El Salvador) (16)	2017 (The Bahamas) (16)	2019 (Mexico) (16)	2021 (Costa Rica) (11)	2023 (The Bahamas) (12)	2025 (The Bahamas) (8)	Apps /11
Antigua and Barbuda	×	×	×	×	×	R1	11th	R1	×	×	×	3
Bahamas	×	×	6th	8th	6th	7th	6th	QF	QF	4th	4th	9
Barbados	×	×	×	×	×	R1	15th	×	×	×	×	2
Belize	×	×	×	×	×	R1	13th	R1	R1	R1	×	5
Bonaire	×	×	×	×	×	×	×	R1	×	×	×	1
Canada	2nd	×	5th	5th	8th	×	10th	×	×	×	×	5
Costa Rica	3rd	4th	2nd	4th	4th	2nd	9th	R1	QF	QF	R1	11
Dominican Republic	×	×	×	×	×	×	×	×	R1	R1	×	2
El Salvador	×	2nd	1st	2nd	2nd	3rd	3rd	3rd	1st	3rd	1st	10
Guadeloupe	×	×	×	×	×	R1	4th	QF	••	R1	×	4
Guatemala	×	×	×	6th	5th	6th	DQ	QF	3rd	QF	2nd	7
Guyana	×	×	×	×	••	×	12th	R1	×	×	×	2
Jamaica	5th	×	×	7th	9th	8th	8th	R1	×	×	×	6
Mexico	4th	1st	3rd	1st	3rd	1st	2nd	1st	4th	2nd	R1	11
Panama	×	×	×	×	×	R1	1st	4th	QF	QF	R1	6
Puerto Rico	×	×	×	×	10th	R1	×	×	×	×	×	2
Trinidad and Tobago	×	×	×	×	7th	5th	7th	QF	QF	QF	R1	7
Turks and Caicos Islands	×	×	×	×	×	R1	14th	R1	R1	R1	×	5
United States	1st	3rd	4th	3rd	1st	4th	5th	2nd	2nd	1st	3rd	11
U.S. Virgin Islands	×	×	×	×	×	R1	16th	R1	×	×	×	3

=== Performance of qualifiers at the World Cup ===
The following is a performance timeline of the CONCACAF teams who have gone on to appear in the World Cup, having qualified from the above events.

Legend

- 1st – Champions
- 2nd – Runners-up
- 3rd – Third place
- 4th – Fourth place
- – Hosts (qualify automatically)
- QF – Quarter-finals
- R1 – Round 1 (group stage)
- q – Qualified for upcoming tournament
- Total – Total times qualified for World Cup

Timeline

Year Team	(Brazil) 2005	(Brazil) 2006	(Brazil) 2007	(France) 2008	(United Arab Emirates) 2009	(Italy) 2011	(French Polynesia) 2013	(Portugal) 2015	(The Bahamas) 2017	(Paraguay) 2019	(Russia) 2021	(United Arab Emirates) 2023	(Seychelles) 2025	Total
Bahamas									R1					1
Canada		QF												1
Costa Rica					R1			R1						2
El Salvador				R1	R1	4th	QF				R1		q	6
Guatemala													q	1
Mexico			2nd	R1		QF		R1	R1	R1		R1		7
Panama									R1					1
United States	R1	R1	R1				R1			R1	R1	R1		7
Total number of unique qualifiers														8
