= Paraíba World Beach Games =

Annual multi-sport beach event in João Pessoa, Brazil

- Status: Active
- Genre: Multi-sport event
- Begins: February
- Ends: April
- Frequency: Annual
- Venue: Busto de Tamandaré, Praia de Tambaú
- Locations: João Pessoa, Paraíba, Brazil
- Country: Brazil
- Inaugurated: 2024
- Major events: Beach soccer, beach volleyball, beach tennis, sailing, futevôlei, and others
- Organiser: Government of Paraíba; Secretariat of Youth, Sport and Leisure (SEJEL)
- Website: paraibaworldbeachgames

The Paraíba World Beach Games (PWBG) is an annual multi-sport event focused on beach and water sports, held in João Pessoa, the capital of Paraíba state in Brazil. Organized by the Government of Paraíba through the Secretariat of Youth, Sport and Leisure (SEJEL), it features competitions, exhibitions, clinics, and public activities primarily along the city's coastline, with its main arena at the Busto de Tamandaré on Praia de Tambaú.

The event promotes Paraíba's identity as the "Terra do Sol" (Land of the Sun). It includes a wide range of modalities such as beach volleyball (including stages of the Beach Pro Tour), futevôlei, beach tennis, sailing, handball de praia, aquarace, and others, spread over 35+ days.

Beach soccer holds particular prominence in recent editions, often highlighted from events such as the Copa das Nações de Beach Soccer (featuring national teams such as Brazil, Japan, and the United States).

It is entirely distinct from the World Beach Games organized by the Association of National Olympic Committees (ANOC).

== History ==
João Pessoa is situated on the easternmost point of the Americas, giving it a distinctive coastal identity and year-round beach climate. The Paraíba state government launched the event to capitalize on the city's natural assets, promote beach sports culture, and attract domestic and international athletes and tourists to the region.

The games are organized under the brand "Terra do Sol" and are intended to grow João Pessoa's profile as a destination for elite and recreational beach sports. Entry to most public-facing activities is free of charge, contributing to large spectator attendance and a festive atmosphere along the orla (waterfront).

=== Founding (2024) ===
The Paraíba World Beach Games was inaugurated in 2024 as a state initiative to host large-scale beach sports programming in João Pessoa. The inaugural edition established the event's format of combining elite international competitions with community-facing exhibitions, clinics, and open-access activities.

=== 2025 edition ===
The 2025 edition was launched by Governor João Azevêdo with a reported participation of more than 10,000 athletes across all sports modalities. The edition reinforced the event's national and international reach and cemented its place on the annual sporting calendar of northeast Brazil.

=== 2026 edition ===
The 2026 edition ran from 25 February to 1 April (some sources cite 2 April), spanning approximately 35–37 days of continuous programming. The full calendar was officially presented at a ceremony held on 20 February 2026 at the Teatro Paulo Pontes in the Espaço Cultural José Lins do Rego.

The 2026 edition featured 12 or more beach and water sports modalities and attracted national and international athletes alongside strong public attendance.

== Venue ==
The primary venue is a temporary arena complex erected at the Busto de Tamandaré, located on the waterfront between Praia de Tambaú and Praia de Cabo Branco in João Pessoa. Additional activities extend along the city's broader orla (coastal promenade). The temporary arena structure is dismantled between annual editions.

== Sports ==
The Paraíba World Beach Games features a range of beach and water sports modalities.

Sport	Status	Notes
Beach soccer	Regular	Hosted the Copa das Nações (Nations Cup) in 2026
Beach volleyball	Regular	FIVB Beach Pro Tour Elite16 held in 2026
Beach tennis	Regular	
Futevôlei	Regular	Brazilian-origin hybrid sport
Sailing	Debuted 2026	Classes include Hobie Cat, ILCA, Wing Foil, and Optimist
Surf	Featured	
Standup paddleboard (SUP)	Featured	
Wakeboard	Featured	

== Key competitions ==
=== Copa das Nações de Beach Soccer (2026) ===
The Copa das Nações de Beach Soccer (Nations Cup of Beach Soccer) was held from 19 to 21 March 2026 (with some preliminary matches beginning on 18 March) at the main arena at the Busto de Tamandaré. The tournament featured three national teams:

- Brazil
- Japan
- United States

Brazil opened the tournament with a 7–2 victory over Japan. Japan defeated the United States 3–1 in another group stage match and Brazil defeated the USA 8–6. Brazil qualified automatically for the final after winning both group matches. The semifinal decided the second finalist, with Japan advancing with a 7–1 victory over USA. Brazil will verse Japan in the final.

=== FIVB Beach Pro Tour – Elite16 João Pessoa (2026) ===
A stage of the FIVB Beach Pro Tour at the Elite16 level was held from 11 to 15 March 2026 within the framework of the PWBG, featuring elite international beach volleyball pairs in both the men's and women's draws. The tournament included qualification rounds, main draw matches, and medal finals. Governor João Azevêdo attended the finals.

=== Sailing debut (2026) ===
Sailing made its debut at the PWBG during the 2026 edition, with regattas held from 20 to 22 March 2026. Competing classes included Hobie Cat, ILCA (formerly Laser), Wing Foil, and Optimist. Free sailing lessons and a night nautical excursion were offered to the public alongside the competitive programme.

== Editions ==
Year	Dates	Host city	Notable highlights
2024	2024	João Pessoa	Inaugural edition
2025	2025	João Pessoa	10,000+ athletes
2026	25 February – 1/2 April 2026	João Pessoa	FIVB Elite16; Copa das Nações de Beach Soccer; sailing debut

== Governance and organization ==
The event is organized by the Government of Paraíba through the Secretariat of Youth, Sport and Leisure (Secretaria da Juventude, do Esporte e do Lazer; SEJEL). Governor João Azevêdo has been closely associated with the event's promotion since its launch.

The PWBG is not affiliated with, nor sanctioned by, the Association of National Olympic Committees (ANOC) or its World Beach Games series. Individual competitions held within the PWBG framework (such as the FIVB Beach Pro Tour stage) retain their own separate international sanctioning bodies.
