= 2007 CONCACAF and CONMEBOL Beach Soccer Championship =

2007 FIFA Beach Soccer World Cup qualifiers for (CONCACAF and CONMEBOL)

Tournament details
- Host country: Mexico
- Dates: 9–12 August
- Teams: 7 (from 2 confederations)
- Venue(s): 1 (in 1 host city)

Final positions
- Champions: United States (1st title)
- Runners-up: Uruguay
- Third place: Argentina
- Fourth place: Mexico

Tournament statistics
- Matches played: 12
- Goals scored: 98 (8.17 per match)

The 2007 CONCACAF and CONMEBOL Beach Soccer championship also known as the 2007 FIFA Beach Soccer World Cup qualifiers for CONCACAF and CONMEBOL a beach soccer championship for nations of the Americas, held in August 2007, in Acapulco, Mexico, to determine the best countries' national teams in the region and hence which nations would progress to the World Cup later that year.

The United States won the championship, beating Uruguay in the final, whilst Argentina beat Mexico in the third place play off to finish third and fourth respectively. These nations moved on to play in the 2007 FIFA Beach Soccer World Cup in Rio de Janeiro, Brazil from 2 November - 11 November.

The two groups were originally staged as two separate championships for each of the confederations; the winners of those groups were deemed to of won their respective confederation titles. Concluding the event were a set of friendly matches between the respective winners, runners-up etc. of each championship, to unofficially rank the teams collectively from 1st through 6th place.

However, since 2010, CONCACAF who organised the event has retrospectively amended history to now refer to the event as one single joint championship between CONMEBOL and CONCACAF nations. Following the group stage, the concluding friendly matches are now deemed to have been the final stage of the tournament, officially determining final placements and podium finishes of the combined nations of both confederations in one set of final standings.

== Participating nations ==
North, Central American and Caribbean zone:

- Costa Rica
- El Salvador
- Mexico
- United States

South American zone:

- Argentina
- Uruguay
- Venezuela

Note: Brazil did not play in the championship as they qualified to the 2007 World Cup as hosts.

== Group stage ==
CONCACAF and CONMEBOL were split up into two separate groups, before playing each other in the play off stage.

=== CONCACAF Group (North, Central American and Caribbean zone) ===
Team	Pld	W	L	GF	GA	GD	Pts	Notes
United States	3	3	0	19	12	+7	9	Qualified to the 2007 FIFA Beach Soccer World Cup
Mexico	3	2	1	13	10	+3	6	Qualified to the 2007 FIFA Beach Soccer World Cup
Costa Rica	3	1	2	8	11	-3	3	
El Salvador	3	0	3	12	19	-7	0	

9 August 2007

United States	9–5	El Salvador

Acapulco

9 August 2007

Mexico	3–1	Costa Rica

Acapulco

10 August 2007

United States	5–3	Costa Rica

Acapulco

10 August 2007

Mexico	6–4	El Salvador

Acapulco

11 August 2007

Costa Rica	4–3	El Salvador

Acapulco

11 August 2007

United States	5–4	Mexico

Acapulco

=== CONMEBOL Group (South America) ===
Team	Pld	W	L	GF	GA	GD	Pts	Notes
Uruguay	2	2	0	8	3	+5	6	Qualified to the 2007 FIFA Beach Soccer World Cup
Argentina	2	1	1	7	5	+2	3	Qualified to the 2007 FIFA Beach Soccer World Cup
Venezuela	2	0	2	1	8	-7	0	

9 August 2007

Argentina	4–1	Venezuela

Acapulco

10 August 2007

Uruguay	4–0	Venezuela

Acapulco

11 August 2007

Uruguay	4–3	Argentina

Acapulco

== Play off stage ==
=== Fifth place play off ===
12 August 2007

Venezuela	7–5 (a.e.t.)	Costa Rica

Acapulco

=== Third place play off ===
12 August 2007

Argentina	6–5	Mexico

Acapulco

=== Final ===
12 August 2007

United States	4–3	Uruguay

Acapulco

== Winners ==
2007 FIFA Beach Soccer World Cup Qualification
winners:

United States
Second title

== Final standings ==
Rank	Team
1	United States
2	Uruguay
3	Argentina
4	Mexico
5	Venezuela
6	Costa Rica
7	El Salvador
