= Nick Perera =

Spanish-born American footballer

Personal information
- Full name: Nicolas Perera
- Date of birth: 5 June 1986 (age 40)
- Place of birth: Madrid, Spain
- Height: 6 ft 3 in (1.91 m)
- Position: Forward

Team information
- Current team: San Diego Sockers

Youth career
- K.N.S. Tervuren

College career
Years	Team	Apps	(Gls)
2005–2008	UC Santa Barbara Gauchos	70	(18)

Senior career*
Years	Team	Apps	(Gls)
2007	Bakersfield Brigade	3	(0)
2008–2009	Benidorm CF		
2010–2011	San Diego Sockers (indoor)	6	(5)
2011–2014	Milwaukee Wave (indoor)	69	(52)
2014–2016	San Diego Sockers (indoor)	36	(40)
2016–2017	Ontario Fury (indoor)	15	(17)
2017	Syracuse Silver Knights (indoor)	3	(4)
2017–2025	Tacoma Stars (indoor)	143	(179)
2025	Tacoma Stars	6	(0)
2025–	San Diego Sockers (indoor)	28	(23)

International career^{‡}
2012–	United States (beach)	100+	(114)
2011	United States (futsal)	6	(0)

Managerial career
- 2016–2018: UC San Diego Tritons (assistant)
- 2018–2021: Tacoma Stars
- 2023–: Tacoma Stars (assistant)
- 2024–: Tacoma Stars (outdoor)
- 2024–: United States beach (assistant)
- * Club domestic league appearances and goals as of 12 May 2025 ‡ National team caps and goals as of 15:39, 12 April 2024 (UTC)

Nicolas Charles Perera (born June 5, 1986) is an American professional soccer player, coach, and executive. He is the head coach of the Tacoma Stars USL League Two team, captain of the United States Men's National Beach Soccer Team and plays for the Tacoma Stars in the Major Arena Soccer League (MASL). Perera was previously head coach of the Tacoma Stars from 2018 to 2021 and general manager of OL Reign in the National Women's Soccer League (NWSL) from 2022 to 2023.

== Early life and education ==
Perera was born on 5 June 1986 in Madrid, Spain, to Spanish father Prudencio and American mother Dione; he spent most of his childhood in Belgium. Perera speaks six languages: English, Spanish, French, Dutch, Italian, and Portuguese.

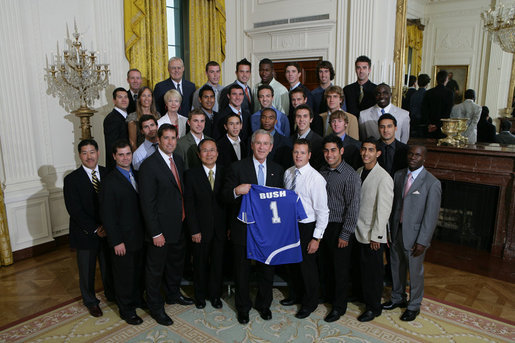
Perera and the 2006 UCSB Gauchos soccer team honored at the White House.

Perera played youth soccer in Belgium with club team K.N.S. Tervuren and his high school team European School of Brussels. He walked on to the UC Santa Barbara Gauchos men's soccer team in 2005 after receiving a recommendation from his mother.

I asked my mom where would be a good place to go to college, and she said Santa Barbara sounded like a fun place. Junior year of high school I came to visit the campus and I fell in love with Santa Barbara.

— Nick Perera

Perera played an integral role in UC Santa Barbara's attack, leading the Gauchos to the 2006 NCAA Division I Men's Soccer Championship and winning the national title. For his performances in the 2006 tournament, he was named the College Cup's Most Outstanding Offensive Player.

== Playing career ==
=== Club ===
After finishing college, Perera played a few matches with California-based Bakersfield Brigade of the USL Premier Development League where he was reunited with UC Santa Barbara teammates Tino Nuñez, Greg Curry, Jon Curry, and Andrew Proctor. Additionally, Eric Wynalda was also on the squad.

Perera then joined Benidorm CF in Spain, before heading back to America to join San Diego Sockers where he played indoor soccer. Despite appearing in just 6 games, he scored 5 goals for the club.

In the off-season, Perera joined Milwaukee Wave. Perera racked up 69 appearances, scoring 52 goals, before moving back to San Diego Sockers ahead of their 2014/15 season. In October 2016, Perera was traded to Ontario Fury. He appeared in 15 games for the Fury scoring 17 goals with 16 assists in his lone season with the club.

Perera was traded in the offseason from Ontario Fury to Syracuse Silver Knights. He appeared 3 times in November 2017 for the Silver Knights and scored 4 goals with two assists. In December 2017, it was announced that Perera was traded to Tacoma Stars.

Florida Beach Soccer Team – 2012 NASSC U.S. Open Championship

In 2012, Nick Perera played a pivotal role for the Florida Beach Soccer FC Team during their championship run at the North American Sand Soccer Championships (NASSC) U.S. Open, held in Virginia Beach, Virginia.

== International ==
Perera represents the United States in beach soccer. As a member of the United States men's national beach soccer team, he appeared in the 2013, 2019, and 2021 editions of the FIFA Beach Soccer World Cup. He was also selected for the 2024 FIFA Beach Soccer World Cup but withdrew due to injury.

Perera led the Americans in goals at the 2013 World Cup. Despite the United States not advancing past the group stage, his 5 goals were good for a seventh-place finish overall in the tournament. He scored an additional 2 goals at the 2019 World Cup.

Perera was named team captain in 2014 and is their all-time leader in goals scored and third in appearances as of April 2023.

Perera has also spent time with the United States men's national futsal team. In September 2011, Perera was called into training camp by head coach Keith Tozer. Shortly after, he was called to be a member of the team at the 2011 Grand Prix de Futsal as one of the United States' three forwards. He appeared in all 6 games, starting 5, en route to a 16th-place finish for the team. He was called into a further camp in March 2012 ahead of the 2012 CONCACAF Futsal Championship, but was not named to the team.

== Coaching career ==
Perera joined the staff of the UC San Diego Tritons men's soccer team as an assistant in July 2016.

In December 2018, Perera became the head coach of Tacoma Stars. He coached the team until 2021 while continuing to play.

Perera was appointed head coach of the Tacoma Stars USL League Two team in midway through the 2024 season. He was brought back as head coach for the 2025 campaign.

In 2024, Nick Perera was named a player/assistant coach for the United States men's national beach soccer team. Originally selected for the 2024 FIFA Beach Soccer World Cup squad, he was forced to withdraw due to injury shortly before the tournament began.

== Executive career ==
Alongside his playing career, Perera is an elected member of the U.S. Soccer Athlete Council.

Perera was named the executive director of Washington Youth Soccer in June 2021.

In February 2022, Perera was named the general manager of OL Reign. He resigned in March 2023.

== Honors and awards ==
UC Santa Barbara Gauchos

- NCAA Division I Men's Soccer Championship: 2006

United States beach soccer

- CONCACAF Beach Soccer Championship: 2013

Individual

- NCAA Division I Men's Soccer Tournament Most Outstanding Player: 2006
- CONCACAF Beach Soccer Championship top scorer: 2013, 2019
