= 2005 CONCACAF and CONMEBOL Beach Soccer Championship =

2005 FIFA Beach Soccer World Cup qualifiers for (CONCACAF and CONMEBOL)

Tournament details
- Host country: Brazil
- Dates: 1–6 March
- Teams: 8 (from 2 confederations)
- Venue(s): 1 (in 1 host city)

Final positions
- Champions: Brazil (1st title)
- Runners-up: Uruguay
- Third place: United States
- Fourth place: Argentina

Tournament statistics
- Matches played: 16
- Goals scored: 130 (8.13 per match)

The 2005 CONCACAF and CONMEBOL Beach Soccer Championship, also known as the 2005 FIFA Beach Soccer World Cup qualifiers for (CONCACAF and CONMEBOL), was the first beach soccer championship for the Americas, held in March 2005, in Rio de Janeiro, Brazil. Hosts Brazil won the championship, beating Uruguay in the final, whilst the United States beat Argentina in the third place play off to finish third and fourth respectively. These nations moved on to play in the 2005 FIFA Beach Soccer World Cup in Rio de Janeiro from 8 May to 15 May.

== Participating nations ==
CONCACAF:

- Canada
- Mexico
- United States

CONMEBOL:

- Argentina
- Brazil
- Peru
- Uruguay
- Venezuela

== Group stage ==
=== Group A ===
Team	Pts	Pld	W	L	GF	GA	GD
Brazil	9	3	3	0	40	6	+34
United States	6	3	2	1	14	16	-2
Canada	3	3	1	2	8	12	-4
Mexico	0	3	0	3	6	34	-28

1 March 2005

Brazil	11 – 2	United States

Copacabana beach

1 March 2005

Canada	4 – 1	Mexico

Copacabana beach

2 March 2005

United States	7 – 2	Mexico

Copacabana beach

2 March 2005

Brazil	6 – 1	Canada

Copacabana beach

3 March 2005

United States	5 – 3	Canada

Copacabana beach

3 March 2005

Brazil	23 – 3	Mexico

Copacabana beach

=== Group B ===
Team	Pts	Pld	W	L	GF	GA	GD
Uruguay	9	3	3	0	15	5	+8
Argentina	6	3	2	1	8	7	+1
Peru	3	3	1	2	13	14	-1
Venezuela	0	3	0	3	5	15	-10

1 March 2005

Uruguay	7 – 2	Peru

Copacabana beach

1 March 2005

Argentina	3 – 0	Venezuela

Copacabana beach

2 March 2005

Uruguay	4 – 2	Venezuela

Copacabana beach

2 March 2005

Argentina	4 – 3	Peru

Copacabana beach

3 March 2005

Uruguay	4 – 1	Argentina

Copacabana beach

3 March 2005

Peru	8 – 3	Venezuela

Copacabana beach

== Knockout stage ==
Semi-finals
4 March 2005
Brazil	2
Argentina	0
4 March 2005
Uruguay	5
United States	1

Final
5 March 2005
Brazil	5
Uruguay	2
Third place
5 March 2005
United States	4
Argentina	2

== Winners ==
(2005) FIFA Beach Soccer World Cup Qualification
(CONCACAF and CONMBEOL) Winners:

Brazil
First title

== Final standings ==
Rank	Team
1	Brazil
2	Uruguay
3	United States
4	Argentina
5	Peru
6	Canada
7	Venezuela
8	Mexico
