= 2007 FIFA Beach Soccer World Cup =

Copa do Mundo de Futebol de Areia da FIFA Rio de Janeiro 2007

Tournament details
- Host country: Brazil
- City: Rio de Janeiro
- Dates: 2–11 November
- Teams: 16 (from 6 confederations)
- Venue: 1 (in 1 host city)

Final positions
- Champions: Brazil (2nd title)
- Runners-up: Mexico
- Third place: Uruguay
- Fourth place: France

Tournament statistics
- Matches played: 32
- Goals scored: 261 (8.16 per match)
- Attendance: 157,300 (4,916 per match)
- Top scorer: (Brazil) Buru (10 goals)
- Best player: (Brazil) Buru
- Fair play award: Brazil

The 2007 FIFA Beach Soccer World Cup was the 3rd edition of the FIFA Beach Soccer World Cup, governed by FIFA. Overall, this was the 13th edition of a world cup in beach soccer since the establishment of the Beach Soccer World Championships which ran from 1995 to 2004 but was not governed by FIFA. It took place in Rio de Janeiro, Brazil, from 2–11 November 2007.

The winners of the tournament were hosts Brazil, who won their second consecutive FIFA Beach Soccer World Cup title and their eleventh title overall.

== Qualifying rounds ==
=== African zone ===
The qualifiers to determine the two Africa nations who would play in the World Cup took place in Durban, South Africa for the second year running between July 3 and July 8. Eight nations took part in the competition, an increase on the six teams that participated in the 2006 Championship, which eventually saw Nigeria claim their first title, qualifying for the second successive World Cup and which saw Senegal finish in second place, qualifying for the first time.

=== Asian zone ===
The Asian qualifiers took place in Dubai, United Arab Emirates, for the second time, between August 14 and August 18. The hosts, the United Arab Emirates qualified for the first time after beating Japan in the final of the championship, 4–3. Iran beat Bahrain in the third place play off to claim the third berth at the World Cup for the second year in a row.

=== European zone ===
For the second year running, European nations qualified through being successful in the 2007 Euro Beach Soccer League. The nations who made it to the second stage of the Superfinal qualified to the World Cup being Portugal, France, Russia and Spain. To decide who would claim the fifth berth, the defeated nations in the competition came back to play in a straight knockout tournament, with the winner progressing to the World Cup. The nation which won the tournament was Italy who beat Switzerland in the final.

=== North, Central American, Caribbean and South American zone ===
Due to the lack of interest from South American nations in the World Cup, CONMEBOL paired up with CONCACAF to hold the second joint Beach Soccer Championship, following 2005. Seven nations took part in the championship, three from South America and four from North America which took place between August 9 and August 12 in Acapulco, Mexico. The tournament saw the United States claim victory, after beating Uruguay 4–3 in the final. Argentina beat Mexico in the third place play off. Therefore, all four national teams mentioned qualified for the World Cup.

=== Oceanian zone ===
The qualifiers to decide the one nation from Oceania that would be competing in the World Cup took place in Auckland, New Zealand, between August 31 and September 3. Despite Vanuatu dominating in the group stage, they lost in the final to the Solomon Islands, who claimed their second title and qualification for a second year in a row.

=== Hosts ===
Brazil qualified automatically as the hosts.

== Teams ==
These are the teams that qualified to the World Cup:

Asian zone:

- Iran
- Japan
- United Arab Emirates (first appearance)

African zone:

- Nigeria
- Senegal (first appearance)

European zone:

- France
- Italy
- Portugal
- Russia
- Spain

North, Central American and Caribbean zone:

- Mexico (first appearance)
- United States

Oceanian zone:

- Solomon Islands

South American zone:

- Argentina
- Uruguay

Hosts:

- Brazil

== Venue ==
As with the two previous FIFA editions of the World Cup held in Rio, the tournament once again took place at the Copacabana Beach Soccer Arena.

Rio de Janeiro	Rio de Janeiro (Brazil)
Copacabana Beach Soccer Arena	Rio de Janeiro (Brazil)
22°58′S 43°10′W	Rio de Janeiro (Brazil)
Capacity: 10,000	Rio de Janeiro (Brazil)

== Group stage ==
The 16 teams were split into 4 groups of 4 teams. Each team played the other 3 teams in its group in a round-robin format, with the top two teams advancing to the quarter finals. The quarter finals, semi finals and the final itself was played in the form of a knockout tournament.

All matches are listed as local time in Rio de Janeiro, (UTC-3)

=== Group A ===
Team	Pld	W	W+	L	GF	GA	GD	Pts
Brazil	3	2	1	0	19	8	+11	8
Mexico	3	1	1	1	12	11	+1	5
Russia	3	1	0	2	9	6	+3	3
Solomon Islands	3	0	0	3	7	22	–15	0

2 November 2007
09:30

Russia	2–2 (a.e.t.)	Mexico
Shkarin 32'; Shaykov 34'	Report	Villalobos 14'; Gonzales 27'
Penalties
Bolabanov (penalty scored); Shakmelyan (penalty missed)	1–2	(penalty scored) Villalobos; (penalty scored) Rosales

Copacabana Beach
Attendance: 8,000
Referee: (Costa Rica) Erick Chavarria

2 November 2007
11:00

Brazil	11–2	Solomon Islands
Buru 2', 31'; Júnior Negrão 6', 36'; Daniel 13', 29'; Bruno 15', 27'; Sidney 23', 23'; Duda 36'	Report	Mela 23'; Naka 27'

Copacabana Beach
Attendance: 9,500
Referee: (Spain) Ruben Eiriz

4 November 2007
11:00

Mexico	4–6	Brazil
Plata 4'; Gonzales 9'; Villalobos 12'; Cati 19'	Report	Buru 9', 20'; Andre 11'; Negao 24'; Bruno 24'; Benjamin 34'

Copacabana Beach
Attendance: 10,000
Referee: (Switzerland) Stephan Faessler

4 November 2007
12:30

Solomon Islands	2–5	Russia
Hale 18'; Anisua 27'	Report	Leonov 1', 19', 30'; Shishin 2'; Shakmelyan 24'

Copacabana Beach
Attendance: 3,000
Referee: (Iran) Ali Sharifat

6 November 2007
11:30

Brazil	2–2 (a.e.t.)	Russia
Andre 19'; Sidney 33'	Report	Shishin 30', 31'
Penalties
Negao (penalty scored); Benjamin (penalty missed); Daniel (penalty scored); Sidney (penalty missed); Mao (penalty scored); Betinho (penalty scored); Bruno (penalty scored)	5–4	(penalty scored) Bolabanov; (penalty missed) Pavlikov; (penalty scored) Gorchinskiy; (penalty missed) Gordonov; (penalty scored) Shishin; (penalty scored) Bukhlitskiy; (penalty missed) Shkmelyan

Copacabana Beach
Attendance: 7,000
Referee: (Hungary) Istvan Maszaros

6 November 2007
14:00

Solomon Islands	3–6	Mexico
Naka 4', 22', 34'	Report	9', 17' Rosales; 14', 29' Plata; 27' Villalobos; 35' Pozos

Copacabana Beach
Attendance: 1,000
Referee: (Lithuania) Sergejus Slyva

=== Group B ===
Team	Pld	W	W+	L	GF	GA	GD	Pts
Spain	3	2	0	1	16	11	+5	6
Portugal	3	0	2	1	11	12	–1	4
United States	3	1	0	2	16	20	–4	3
Iran	3	1	0	2	14	14	0	3

2 November 2007
12:30

Portugal	3–3 (a.e.t.)	Iran
Alan 4', 14', 21'	Report	Naderi 10'; Mesigar 19'; Dara 30'
Penalties
Belchior (penalty scored)	1–0	(penalty missed) Ghorbanpour

Copacabana Beach
Attendance: 3,000
Referee: (Brazil) Ivo De Moraes

2 November 2007
14:00

United States	4–8	Spain
Xexeo 12'; Ibsen 17'; Albuquerque 26'; Chimienti 27'	Report	Nico 2', 31'; Rumbo 14'; Alvarez 23', 31'; Amarelle 24', 33', 34'

Copacabana Beach
Attendance: 2,000
Referee: (Argentina) Juan Rodriguez

4 November 2007
09:30

Spain	4–2	Portugal
Amarelle 14'; J.Torres 19'; Alvarez 22'; Nico 36'	Report	Bilro 23'; Madjer 30'

Copacabana Beach
Attendance: 8,000
Referee: (Italy) Favio Polito

4 November 2007
14:00

Iran	6–7	United States
Aligoli 17'; Ahmadzadeh 18', 18'; Davoudi 28'; Ghorbanpour 31'; Mesigar 35'	Report	Nolz 8', 22'; Chimienti 10', 31'; Morales 20'; Astroga 23'; Ibsen 34'

Copacabana Beach
Attendance: 4,000
Referee: (Netherlands) George Postma

6 November 2007
09:30

Spain	4–5	Iran
C.Torres 5'; Beiro 14'; J.Torres 14', 34'	Report	Mesigar 6'; Ghorbanpour 8', 34'; Aligoli 9'; Ahmadzadeh 20'

Copacabana Beach
Attendance: 2,000
Referee: (Egypt) Mohamed Morsi

6 November 2007
12:30

United States	5–6 (a.e.t.)	Portugal
Astorga 17', 21'; Nolz 26'; Chimienti 30'; Albuquerque 35'	Report	Madjer 2', 35'; Bilro 8', 39'; Alan 14', 18'

Copacabana Beach
Attendance: 2,000
Referee: (France) Sylvain Palhies

=== Group C ===
Team	Pld	W	W+	L	GF	GA	GD	Pts
Senegal	3	2	1	0	15	8	+7	8
Uruguay	3	1	1	1	8	9	–1	5
Italy	3	1	0	2	13	12	+1	3
Japan	3	0	0	3	6	13	–7	0

3 November 2007
11:00

Uruguay	3–2 (a.e.t.)	Italy
Ricaar 23', 23'; Matias 37'	Report	Pasquali 6'; Palamacci 16'

Copacabana Beach
Attendance: 6,000
Referee: (Argentina) Pedro Infantes

3 November 2007
14:00

Japan	1–4	Senegal
Yamauchi 34'	Report	Dieng 5'; Koukpaki 6', 22'; Mbengue 29'

Copacabana Beach
Attendance: 2,000
Referee: (United Arab Emirates) Waleed Al Ali

5 November 2007
09:30

Italy	6–3	Japan
Palmacci 5'; Maiorano 10'; Pasquali 24', 25', 27'; Leghissa 26'	Report	Tabata 7'; Yamauchi 13', 22'

Copacabana Beach
Attendance: 1,000
Referee: (Argentina) Hernan Fernandez

5 November 2007
12:30

Senegal	5–2	Uruguay
Diallo 2'; Koukpaki 8', 29', 31'; Sylla 15'	Report	Parrillo 6'; Ricar 8'

Copacabana Beach
Attendance: 1,000
Referee: (Costa Rica) Franklin Quesada

7 November 2007
11:00

Senegal	6–5 (a.e.t.)	Italy
Kbengue 2', 19'; Koukpaki 8', 39'; Mbengue 9'; Thioune 35'	Report	Palmacci 1'; Pasquali 8', 9'; Maiorano 13'; Feudi 15'

Copacabana Beach
Attendance: 4,500
Referee: (Brazil) Alberto Moreira

7 November 2007
14:00

Japan	2–3	Uruguay
Yamauchi 5'; Arakaki 17'	Report	Parrillo 1'; Ricar 33'; Pampero 35'

Copacabana Beach
Attendance: 1,000
Referee: (Netherlands) George Postma

=== Group D ===
Team	Pld	W	W+	L	GF	GA	GD	Pts
Nigeria	3	1	2	0	14	12	+2	7
France	3	1	1	1	11	10	+1	5
Argentina	3	1	0	2	9	9	0	3
United Arab Emirates	3	0	0	3	13	16	–3	0

3 November 2007
09:30

Nigeria	5–3	Argentina
Ibrahim 4'; Uhunmwangho 12'; Onigbo 15'; Okemmiri 16', 21'	Report	Casado 8'; S. Hilaire 22'; Andrade 23'

Copacabana Beach
Attendance: 4,000
Referee: (Hungary) Istvan Maszaros

3 November 2007
12:30

United Arab Emirates	5–6	France
Bashir 5', 23', 26'; Sadeqi 20'; Aljesmi 35'	Report	Basquaise 4', 9'; Samoun 9', 18', 22', 36'

Copacabana Beach
Attendance: 3,000
Referee: (Brazil) Renato De Carlos

5 November 2007
11:30

Argentina	4–2	United Arab Emirates
F. Hilaire 2', 27'; Minici 15'; Casado 21'	Report	Mesaabi 5'; Sadeqi 22'

Copacabana Beach
Attendance: 1,000
Referee: (Spain) Ruben Eiriz

5 November 2007
14:00

France	3–3 (a.e.t.)	Nigeria
Castro 13'; François 36'; Basquaise 36'	Report	Okpara 11', 20'; Usman 33'
Penalties
François (penalty scored); Pérez (penalty scored); Samoun (penalty missed)	2–3	(penalty scored) Onigbo; (penalty scored) Uhunmwangho; (penalty scored) Olawale

Copacabana Beach
Attendance: 1,300
Referee: (Brazil) Alberto Moreira

7 November 2007
09:30

France	2–2 (a.e.t.)	Argentina
Basquaise 3'; François 6'	Report	E. Hilaire 18'; Minici 26'
Penalties
Castro (penalty scored); Pérez (penalty missed); François (penalty scored)	2–1	(penalty scored) Minici; (penalty missed) Lopez; (penalty missed) Casado

Copacabana Beach
Attendance: 5,000
Referee: (Costa Rica) Erick Chavarria

7 November 2007
12:30

United Arab Emirates	6–6 (a.e.t.)	Nigeria
Alabadla 9', 10', 23'; Albloushi 12'; Karim 22'; Bashir 35'	Report	Okpara 4'; Okemmiri 4'; Olawale 5', 7', 15'; Usman 31'
Penalties
Bashir (penalty missed)	0–1	(penalty scored) Olawale

Copacabana Beach
Attendance: 1,000
Referee: (Brazil) Ivo De Moraes

== Knockout stage ==
Quarter-finals
8 November 2007
Spain	4
Mexico	5
8 November 2007
Nigeria	1
Uruguay	3
8 November 2007
Brazil	10
Portugal	7
8 November 2007
Senegal	3
France	6

Semi-finals
10 November 2007
Mexico	5
Uruguay	2
10 November 2007
Brazil	6
France	2

Final
11 November 2007
Mexico	2
Brazil	8
Third place
11 November 2007
Uruguay (p)	2 (1)
France	2 (0)

=== Quarter finals ===
8 November 2007
09:30

Spain	4–5	Mexico
Alvarez 14'; Beiro 14'; C.Torres 16'; Adam 32'	Report	Villalobos 16', 34'; Gonzales 18'; Plata 26'; Salazar 32'

Copacabana Beach
Attendance: 10,000
Referee: (Switzerland) Stephan Faessler

8 November 2007
11:00

Brazil	10–7	Portugal
Sidney 2', 4'; Andre 11', 27'; Buru 12', 34', 36'; Daniel 13', 30'; Bruno 16'	Report	Madjer 1', 13', 27', 28', 34'; Alan 3'; Hernani 5'

Copacabana Beach
Attendance: 10,000
Referee: (Lithuania) Sergejus Slyva

8 November 2007
12:30

Senegal	3–6	France
Thiaw 13'; Dieng 14'; Mbengue 27'	Report	Pérez 1'; Ottavy 3'; Ruggeri 17'; François 27', 33'; Tanagro 30'

Copacabana Beach
Attendance: 6,000
Referee: (Argentina) Juan Rodriguez

8 November 2007
14:00

Nigeria	1–3	Uruguay
Ibrahim 36'	Report	Matias 29'; Ricar 34'; Parrillo 36'

Copacabana Beach
Attendance: 1,000
Referee: (Italy) Fabio Polito

=== Semi-finals ===
10 November 2007
09:30

Mexico	5–2	Uruguay
Plata 1', 20', 32', 35'; Villalobos 36'	Report	Ricar 4', 24'

Copacabana Beach
Attendance: 10,000
Referee: (Lithuania) Sergejus Slyva

10 November 2007
11:00

Brazil	6–2	France
Buru 1', 2'; Bruno 9', 16'; Betinho 33', 34'	Report	Pérez 1'; Basquaise 35'

Copacabana Beach
Attendance: 10,000
Referee: (Hungary) Istvan Maszaros

=== Third place match ===
11 November 2007
09:30

Uruguay	2–2 (a.e.t.)	France
Pampero 6', 30'	Report	Basquaise 1', 10'
Penalties
Ricar (penalty scored)	1–0	(penalty missed) Pérez

Copacabana Beach
Attendance: 10,000
Referee: (Italy) Fabio Polito

=== Final ===
11 November 2007
11:00

Mexico	2–8	Brazil
Villalobos 14'; Plata 36'	Report	Andre 9', 28'; Bruno 11', 16'; Benjamin 14'; Buru 19'; Betinho 22'; Negao 36'

Copacabana Beach
Attendance: 10,000
Referee: (Spain) Ruben Eiriz

== Winners ==
2007 FIFA Beach Soccer World Cup
Champions

Brazil
Second title
11th world title

== Awards ==
Golden Ball	Silver Ball	Bronze Ball
(Brazil) Buru	(Portugal) Madjer	(Mexico) Morgan Plata
Golden Shoe	Silver Shoe	Bronze Shoe
(Brazil) Buru	(Mexico) Morgan Plata	(Brazil) Bruno
10 goals	9 goals	8 goals
FIFA Fair Play Award
Brazil

== Top scorers ==
10 goals

- (Brazil) Buru

9 goals

- (Mexico) Morgan Plata

8 goals

- (Brazil) Bruno
- (Portugal) Madjer

7 goals

- (Mexico) Ricardo Villalobos
- (France) Jeremy Basquaise
- (Senegal) Pape Koukpaki
- (Uruguay) Ricar

6 goals

- (Portugal) Alan
- (Brazil) Andre
- (Italy) Roberto Pasquali

5 goals

- (Brazil) Sidney

4 goals

- (Spain) Amarelle
- (France) Didier Samoun
- (Brazil) Júnior Negrão
- (France) Stéphane François

4 goals (cont.)

- (Solomon Islands) James Naka
- (United Arab Emirates) Haidar Bashir
- (Spain) Javi Alvarez
- (United States) Mario Chimienti
- (Japan) Shusei Yamauchi
- (Senegal) Gomis Mbengue
- (Brazil) Daniel

3 goals

- (Mexico) Oscar Gonzales
- (United Arab Emirates) Bakhit Alabadla
- (Iran) Hamed Ghorbanpour
- (Iran) Mohammad Ahmadzadeh
- (Spain) Nico
- (United States) Joshua Nolz
- (Nigeria) Isiaka Olawale
- (Brazil) Betinho
- (Russia) Dmitry Shishin
- (United States) Benyam Astorga
- (Russia) Ilya Leonov
- (Italy) Paolo Palmacci
- (Iran) Moslem Mesigar
- (Portugal) Bilro
- (Nigeria) Ogbonnaya Okemmiri
- (Nigeria) Uga Okpara

3 goals (cont.)

- (Spain) Javier Torres
- (Uruguay) Pampero
- (Uruguay) Parrillo

2 goals

- (France) Sebastien Perez
- (Brazil) Benjamin
- (Italy) Damiano Maiorano
- (United States) Zak Ibsen
- (Nigeria) Idoko Ibrahim
- (Argentina) Federico Hilaire
- (Iran) Ali Aligoli
- (Argentina) Facundo Minici
- (Argentina) Gustavo Casado
- (United States) Jevin Albuquerque
- (United Arab Emirates) Qambar Sadeqi
- (Spain) Cristian Torres
- (Senegal) Malick Dieng
- (Nigeria) Suleiman Usman
- (Spain) Miguel Beiro
- (Mexico) Gustavo Rosales
- (Uruguay) Matias

40 others scored 1 goal each

== Final standings ==
Position	Team
1	Brazil
2	Mexico
3	Uruguay
4	France
5	Senegal
6	Nigeria
7	Spain
8	Portugal
9	Russia
10	Italy
11	Iran
12	Argentina
13	United States
14	United Arab Emirates
15	Japan
16	Solomon Islands
