= 2005 FIFA Beach Soccer World Cup =

Copa do Mundo de Futebol de Areia da FIFA Rio de Janeiro 2005

Tournament details
- Host country: Brazil
- City: Rio de Janeiro
- Dates: 8–15 May
- Teams: 12 (from 6 confederations)
- Venue: 1 (in 1 host city)

Final positions
- Champions: France (1st title)
- Runners-up: Portugal
- Third place: Brazil
- Fourth place: Japan

Tournament statistics
- Matches played: 20
- Goals scored: 164 (8.2 per match)
- Attendance: 110,500 (5,525 per match)
- Top scorer: (Portugal) Madjer (12 goals)
- Best player: (Portugal) Madjer
- Fair play award: Japan

The 2005 FIFA Beach Soccer World Cup was the first edition of the FIFA Beach Soccer World Cup, an international beach soccer competition contest by men's national teams and organized by FIFA. Overall, it was the 11th edition of a world cup in beach soccer since its establishment with the first Beach Soccer World Championships in 1995. It took place in at Copacabana Beach in Rio de Janeiro, Brazil, between 8 and 15 May.

France defeated Portugal 1–0 in a penalty shootout, following a 3–3 draw after extra-time, to win their first title.

== Organisation ==
The 12 teams present at the finals in Brazil were split into four groups of three teams. Each team played the other two teams in its group in a round-robin format, with the top two teams advancing to the quarter-finals. The quarter-finals, semi-finals and the final itself was played in the form of a knockout tournament.

== Teams ==
=== Qualification ===
European teams gained qualification by finishing in the top three spots of the 2004 Euro Beach Soccer League. The final spot was contested between the next four best teams in a small knockout tournament a few days before the World Cup began which saw Spain win. South American and North American qualification was gained by finishing in the top spots of the 2005 CONCACAF and CONMEBOL Beach Soccer Championship. The other nations received invites.

This was the first edition of the World Cup in which every continent had a representative.

=== Entrants ===
Asian zone:

- Japan
- Thailand

African zone:

- South Africa

European zone:

- France
- Portugal
- Spain
- Ukraine^{1}

North, Central American and Caribbean zone:

- United States

Oceanian zone:

- Australia^{1}

South American zone:

- Argentina
- Uruguay

Host nation:

- Brazil (South America)

Notes:

1. Teams making their debut.

== Group stage ==
All matches are listed as local time in Rio de Janeiro, (UTC-3)

=== Group A ===
Team	Pld	W	W+	L	GF	GA	GD	Pts
Brazil	2	2	0	0	13	3	+10	6
Spain	2	1	0	1	5	5	0	3
Thailand	2	0	0	2	3	13	−10	0

8 May 2005
13:30

Brazil	9–2	Thailand
Junior Negão 2'; Nenem 10', 16', 20'; Bruno 11', 32'; Betinho 13'; Benjamin 25'; Juninho 31'	Report	26' Pongsak; 31' Sanae

Copacabana Beach
Attendance: 8,000
Referee: Carlos Manuel Robles (Chile)

9 May 2005
16:00

Spain	4–1	Thailand
Amarelle 16', 28'; David 32', 32'	Report	28' Anupong

Copacabana Beach
Attendance: 500
Referee: Pedro Infantes (Venezuela)

10 May 2005
19:45

Brazil	4–1	Spain
Benjamin 4'; Junior Negão 5'; Nenem 15'; Juninho 34'	Report	2' Amarelle

Copacabana Beach
Attendance: 10,000
Referee: Jose Luis Da Rosa (Uruguay)

=== Group B ===
Team	Pld	W	W+	L	GF	GA	GD	Pts
Portugal	2	2	0	0	13	3	+10	6
Japan	2	1	0	1	3	6	−3	3
United States	2	0	0	2	5	12	−7	0

8 May 2005
12:45

Portugal	4–0	Japan
Alan 9', 19'; Madjer 13', 31'	Report

Copacabana Beach
Attendance: 1,000
Referee: Antonio Buaiz (Brazil)

9 May 2005
17:15

United States	2–3	Japan
Astorga 1'; Testa 19'	Report	14' Kuroki; 17' Toma; 29' Nakamura

Copacabana Beach
Attendance: 2,000
Referee: Carlos Manuel Robles (Chile)

10 May 2005
16:00

Portugal	9–3	United States
Hernani 3'; Alan 6', 18'; Madjer 10', 22', 29'; Jonas 10'; Belchior 20'; Marinho 30'	Report	24' Braga; 30' Astorga; 33' Farberoff

Copacabana Beach
Attendance: 1,500
Referee: Carlos Manuel Robles (Chile)

=== Group C ===
Team	Pld	W	W+	L	GF	GA	GD	Pts
Uruguay	2	2	0	0	12	7	+5	6
Ukraine	2	1	0	1	12	6	+6	3
South Africa	2	0	0	2	4	15	−11	0

8 May 2005
18:00

Uruguay	7–3	South Africa
Martin 1', 28'; Chueco 1'; Parrillo 9'; Fabian 13'; Ricar 27', 32'	Report	1', 32' Francisco; 23' Mthembu

Copacabana Beach
Attendance: 2,000
Referee: Joao Almeida (Portugal)

9 May 2005
19:45

Ukraine	8–1	South Africa
Ulianytskyi 7'; Varenytsya 18', 31'; Moroz 9'; Koryenyev 10', 20'; Pylypenko 13'; Bozhenko 22'	Report	34' Dicks

Copacabana Beach
Attendance: 500
Referee: Antonio Buaiz (Brazil)

10 May 2005
17:45

Uruguay	5–4	Ukraine
Seba 8', 29'; Ricar 13'; Parrillo 24', 32'	Report	14' Varentsya; 22' Bozhenko; 26' Pylypenko; 28' Koryenyev

Copacabana Beach
Attendance: 2,000
Referee: Marcelo Bispo (Brazil)

=== Group D ===
Team	Pld	W	W+	L	GF	GA	GD	Pts
France	2	2	0	0	13	3	+10	6
Argentina	2	1	0	1	5	9	−4	3
Australia	2	0	0	2	2	8	−6	0

8 May 2005
10:15

France	5–1	Australia
Cardoso 3', 30'; Ottavy 11'; Sciortino 15'; Edouard 25'	Report	16' Karavatakis

Copacabana Beach
Attendance: 5,000
Referee: Jose Luis Da Rosa (Uruguay)

9 May 2005
18:15

Argentina	3–1	Australia
Hilaire 7', 28'; Acosta 14'	Report	25' Buonavoglia

Copacabana Beach
Attendance: 3,000
Referee: Alberto Moreira (Brazil)

10 May 2005
18:30

France	8–2	Argentina
Mendy 5'; Sciortino 6'; Sansoni 11'; Ottavy 12', 32'; Samoun 17', 29'; Cardoso 24'	Report	24' Petrasso; 26' Hilaire

Copacabana Beach
Attendance: 7,000
Referee: Joao Almeida (Portugal)

== Knockout stage ==
Quarter-finals
12 May 2005
France	7
Spain	4
12 May 2005
Uruguay	3
Japan	4
12 May 2005
Portugal	5
Ukraine	3
12 May 2005
Brazil	9
Argentina	3

Semi-finals
14 May 2005
France	4
Japan	1
14 May 2005
Portugal (p)	6 (2)
Brazil	6 (1)

Final
15 May 2005
France (p)	3 (1)
Portugal	3 (0)
Third place
15 May 2005
Japan	2
Brazil	11

=== Quarter-finals ===
12 May 2005
16:00

France	7–4	Spain
Valeiro 5' (o.g.); Mendy 7', 13'; Cardoso 19', 36'; Edouard 22'; Cantona 28'	Report	12', 34' David; 24', 36' Nico

Copacabana Beach
Attendance: 5,000
Referee: Jose Luis Da Rosa (Uruguay)

12 May 2005
17:15

Portugal	5–3	Ukraine
Jonas 12'; Belchior 14', 29'; Madjer 15', 25'	Report	8' Bozhenko; 25' Pylypenko; 36' Moroz

Copacabana Beach
Attendance: 3,000
Referee: Antonio Buaiz (Brazil)

12 May 2005
18:30

Uruguay	3–4	Japan
Ricar 1', 24'; Parrillo 17'	Report	18', 23' Kawaharazuka; 18' Makino; 20' Toma

Copacabana Beach
Attendance: 10,000
Referee: Christian Hauben (Belgium)

12 May 2005
19:45

Brazil	9–3	Argentina
Romário 1', 30', 33'; Jorginho 2'; Nenem 7', 22'; Juninho 8'; Benjamin 15'; Buru 35'	Report	7' S. Hilaire; 32' E. Hilaire; 34' Acosta

Copacabana Beach
Attendance: 10,000
Referee: Lakhdar Benchabane (France)

=== Semi-finals ===
14 May 2005
11:00

Brazil	6–6 (a.e.t.)	Portugal
Benjamin 1', 16'; Bruno 5', 6', 8'; Nenem 22'	Report	1' Alan; 2', 8', 22', 27' Madjer; 4' Marinho
Penalties
Bruno (penalty scored); Jorginho (penalty missed)	1–2	(penalty scored) Alan; (penalty scored) Madjer

Copacabana Beach
Attendance: 10,000
Referee: Carlos Manuel Robles (Chile)

14 May 2005
21:30

France	4–1	Japan
Mendy 4', 18'; Sciortino 32'; Cardoso 34'	Report	35' Kawaharazuka

Copacabana Beach
Attendance: 10,000
Referee: Jose Luis Da Rosa (Uruguay)

=== Third place play-off ===
15 May 2005
21:30

Japan	2–11	Brazil
Kawaharazuka 3'; Wakabayashi 16'	Report	7' Junior Negão; 8', 19' Buru; 10' Juninho; 13', 21' Nenem; 17' Benjamin; 24', 25', 27' Romário; 33' Jorginho

Copacabana Beach
Attendance: 10,000
Referee: Joao Martins Pinto Correia (Portugal)

=== Final ===
15 May 2005
11:00

France	3–3 (a.e.t.)	Portugal
Mendy 3', 17', 29'	Report	24' Madjer; 34', 35' Belchior
Penalties
Ottavy (penalty scored)	1–0	(penalty missed) Alan

Copacabana Beach
Attendance: 10,000
Referee: Carlos Manuel Robles (Chile)

== Winners ==
2005 FIFA Beach Soccer World Cup
champions

France
First title

== Awards ==
Golden Ball	Silver Ball	Bronze Ball
(Portugal) Madjer	(Brazil) Nenem	(Spain) Amarelle
Golden Shoe	Silver Shoe	Bronze Shoe
(Portugal) Madjer	(Brazil) Nenem	(France) Mendy
12 goals	9 goals	8 goals
FIFA Fair Play Award
Japan

== Top scorers ==
12 goals

- (Portugal) Madjer

9 goals

- (Brazil) Nenem

8 goals

- (France) Anthony Mendy

6 goals

- (Brazil) Romário
- (Brazil) Benjamin
- (Brazil) Buru
- (France) Jairzinho Cardoso

5 goals

- (Portugal) Belchior
- (Uruguay) Ricar
- (Portugal) Alan

4 goals

- (Spain) David
- (Uruguay) Parrillo
- (Brazil) Juninho
- (Japan) Takeshi Kawaharazuka

3 goals

- (Ukraine) Yevgen Varenytsya
- (Spain) Amarelle
- (Ukraine) Dmytro Koryenyev
- (Ukraine) Oleksandr Pylypenko
- (Ukraine) Sergiy Bozhenko
- (France) Noel Sciortino
- (Brazil) Junior Negão
- (France) Thierry Ottavy

2 goals

- (Brazil) Bruno
- (South Africa) Ricardo Francisco

2 goals (cont.)

- (Argentina) Alberto Acosta
- (Argentina) Ezequiel Hilaire
- (Argentina) Federico Hilaire
- (Uruguay) Martin
- (Spain) Nico
- (Uruguay) Seba
- (Ukraine) Victor Moroz
- (Portugal) Jonas
- (France) Didier Samoun
- (France) Jean-Marc Edouard
- (Brazil) Jorginho
- (Portugal) Marinho
- (Japan) Masahito Toma

25 others scored 1 goal each
Own goal

- (Spain) Valeiro (for France)

== Final standings ==
Position	Team
1	France
2	Portugal
3	Brazil
4	Japan
5	Uruguay
6	Ukraine
7	Spain
8	Argentina
9	Australia
10	United States
11	Thailand
12	South Africa
