= Mexico national beach soccer team =

National beach soccer team representing Mexico

Mexico
- Nickname(s): El Tri (The Tri); El Tricolor (The Tricolor)
- Association: Mexican Football Federation
- Confederation: CONCACAF (North America)
- Head coach: Francisco Cati
- FIFA code: MEX
- BSWW ranking: 31 (19 January 2026)
First colours
Second colours

First international
- Brazil 13–9 Mexico (Miami, United States; 2 June 1995)

Biggest win
- Mexico 15–4 Costa Rica

Biggest defeat
- Brazil 23–3 Mexico (Rio de Janeiro, Brazil; 2 March 2005)

World Cup
- Appearances: 5
- Best result: (silver) Runners-up (2007)

CONCACAF Beach Soccer Championship
- Appearances: 11 (first in 2006)
- Best result: (gold) Champions (2008, 2011, 2015, 2019)

The Mexico national beach soccer team represents Mexico in international beach football competitions and is controlled by the FEMEXFUT, the governing body for football in Mexico. Mexico have a relatively short beach soccer history, which means the key figures in their recent success remain a part of the national team set-up.

== Individual awards ==
In addition to team victories, Mexico players have won individual awards at FIFA World Youth Cups.

Year	Award	Player
2007	Silver Shoe	Morgan Plata
2007	Bronze Ball	Morgan Plata

== Competitive record ==
=== FIFA Beach Soccer World Cup record ===
FIFA Beach Soccer World Cup record
Year	Round	Position	Pld	W	W+	L	GF	GA	Pts
(Brazil) 2005	did not qualify								
(Brazil) 2006	did not qualify								
(Brazil) 2007	Runners-up	2nd	6	3	1	2	24	25	12
(France) 2008	Group stage	11th	3	1	0	2	6	12	3
(United Arab Emirates) 2009	did not qualify								
(Italy) 2011	Quarter-finals	8th	4	1	1	2	9	13	6
(French Polynesia) 2013	did not qualify								
(Portugal) 2015	Group stage	15th	3	0	0	3	4	11	0
(The Bahamas) 2017	Group stage	13th	3	0	0	3	7	16	0
(Paraguay) 2019	Group stage	12th	3	0	0	3	3	13	0
(Russia) 2021	did not qualify								
(United Arab Emirates) 2024	Group stage	16th	3	0	0	3	7	17	0
(Seychelles) 2025	did not qualify								
Total	Runners-up	7/13	25	5	2	12	49	78	21

=== CONCACAF Beach Soccer Championship ===
CONCACAF Beach Soccer Championship record
Year	Round	Position	Pld	W	W+	L	GF	GA	Pts
(Costa Rica) 2006	Fourth place	4th	4	1	0	3	15	19	3
(Mexico) 2008	Champions	1st	3	3	0	0	13	3	9
(Mexico) 2009	Third place	3rd	4	3	0	1	22	9	9
(Mexico) 2010	Champions	1st	5	3	1	1	15	10	11
(The Bahamas) 2013	Third place	3rd	4	3	0	1	30	11	9
(El Salvador) 2015	Champions	1st	6	6	0	0	33	9	18
(The Bahamas) 2017	Runners-up	2nd	6	5	0	1	37	10	15
(Mexico) 2019	Champions	1st	6	6	0	0	30	12	18
(Costa Rica) 2021	Fourth place	4th	5	3	0	2	20	20	9
(The Bahamas) 2023	Runners-up	2nd	6	5	0	1	20	10	16
(The Bahamas) 2025	Group Stage	5th	3	1	0	2	12	12	3
Total	4 titles	11/11	52	39	1	31	237	125	117

=== World Beach Games ===
World Beach Games record										Qualification				
Year	Round	Pos	Pld	W	W+	L	GF	GA	GD	Round	Pos	Pld	W	L
(Qatar) 2019	Group stage	10th	3	1	0	2	14	16	−1	Champions	1st	3	3	0
(Indonesia) 2023	to be determined									to be determined				
Total	0 titles	1/1	3	1	0	2	14	16	−2	1 title	1/1	3	3	0

=== Central American and Caribbean Beach Games ===
Central American and Caribbean Beach Games record
Year	Round	Pos	Pld	W	W+	L	GF	GA	GD
(Colombia) 2022	Third place	3rd	5	2	0	3	18	14	+4
Total	0 titles	1/1	5	2	0	3	18	14	+4

== Titles ==
- CONCACAF Beach Soccer World Cup qualification:
  - Winners (4): 2008, 2011, 2015, 2019
  - Second place (3): 2007,2017,2023
  - Third place (2): 2009, 2013
- Central American and Caribbean Beach Games
  - Third place (1): 2022
- Copa Latina:
  - Third place (1): 2011

== Current squad ==
No.	Pos.	Player	Date of birth (age)	Club
1	GK	Gabriel Macias	19 October 1991 (aged 32)	Unattached
2	MF	Héctor Acevedo	16 March 1992 (aged 31)	Unattached
3	DF	Salomón Wbias	9 March 1996 (aged 27)	Unattached
4	DF	Edgar Portilla	29 March 1995 (aged 28)	(Argentine Football Association) Boca Juniors
5	MF	Pabel Montes	26 August 1996 (aged 27)	Unattached
6	MF	Alejandro Garcia	21 February 1992 (aged 31)	Unattached
7	FW	Diego Martinez	22 September 1988 (aged 35)	Unattached
8	MF	Enoch Lopez	30 September 1993 (aged 30)	Unattached
9	FW	Cristofher Castillo	7 December 1991 (aged 32)	Unattached
10	MF	José Vizcarra	21 December 1990 (aged 33)	Unattached
11	FW	Ramón Maldonado	25 April 1988 (aged 35)	Unattached
12	GK	Jeancob Ramirez	11 November 2000 (aged 23)	Unattached

== See also ==
- Mexico national football team record
- Mexico national football team schedule and results
- Mexico national under-17 football team
- Mexico national under-20 football team
- Mexico national under-23 football team
- Mexico national futsal team
