= List of FIFA Beach Soccer World Cup finals =

Locations of FIFA Beach Soccer World Cup finals

The FIFA Beach Soccer World Cup finals are matches which are the last of the competition, and the results determine which country's team is declared world champions. If after 36 minutes of regular play the score is a draw, an additional 3-minute period of play, called extra time, is added. If such a game is still tied after extra time it is decided by kicks from the penalty mark, commonly called a penalty shootout, under the sudden death rules. The winning penalty shoot-out team are then declared champions. The 2011 final between Brazil and Russia was the highest ever scoring final with 20 goals in all. The lowest scoring final was in 1998, when Brazil beat Uruguay by just 3 goals to nil.

In the fifteen world cups, only one has ever gone past normal time being the first FIFA controlled world cup, the 2005 FIFA Beach Soccer World Cup, when France and Portugal were drawn 3–3 after 36 minutes. The game eventually went to penalties, with Eric Cantona's side winning 1–0.

In the fifteen tournaments held, thirty-eight nations have appeared at least once. Of these, ten have made it to the final match, and three have won. With fifteen titles, Brazil are clearly the most successful and powerful nation who compete in the World Cup and also one of two nations to have participated in every World Cup finals tournament. The other champions are Portugal, who won in 2001 and, as previously stated, France, who won in 2005.

== Finals ==
- Match was won on a penalty shootout

=== Beach Soccer World Championship Finals ===
Year	Champions	Final score	Runners-up	Venue	Location
1995	Brazil	8–1	United States	Copacabana beach	Rio de Janeiro, Brazil
1996	Brazil	3–0	Uruguay	Copacabana beach	Rio de Janeiro, Brazil
1997	Brazil	5–2	Uruguay	Copacabana beach	Rio de Janeiro, Brazil
1998	Brazil	9–2	France	Copacabana beach	Rio de Janeiro, Brazil
1999	Brazil	5–2	Portugal	Copacabana beach	Rio de Janeiro, Brazil
2000	Brazil	6–2	Peru	Marina da Glória	Rio de Janeiro, Brazil
2001	Portugal	9–3	France	Costa do Sauipe	Bahia, Brazil
2002	Brazil	6–5	Portugal	Enseada Beach	Guarujá, Brazil
2003	Brazil	8–2	Spain	Copacabana beach	Rio de Janeiro, Brazil
2004	Brazil	6–4	Spain	Copacabana beach	Rio de Janeiro, Brazil

=== FIFA Beach Soccer World Cup Finals ===
Year	Champions	Final score	Runners-up	Venue	Location
2005	France	3–3; 1–0 (pen.)	Portugal	Copacabana beach	Rio de Janeiro, Brazil
2006	Brazil	4–1	Uruguay	Copacabana beach	Rio de Janeiro, Brazil
2007	Brazil	8–2	Mexico	Copacabana beach	Rio de Janeiro, Brazil
2008	Brazil	5–3	Italy	Plage du Prado	Marseille, France
2009	Brazil	10–5	Switzerland	Jumeirah Beach	Dubai, United Arab Emirates
2011	Russia	12–8	Brazil	Stadio del Mare	Ravenna, Italy
2013	Russia	5–1	Spain	Stade de To'ata	Papeete, Tahiti
2015	Portugal	5–3	Tahiti	Espinho Beach	Espinho, Portugal
2017	Brazil	6–0	Tahiti	Nassau Stadium	Nassau, Bahamas
2019	Portugal	6–4	Italy	Los Pynandi Stadium	Asunción, Paraguay
2021	RFU	5–2	Japan	Luzhniki Beach Soccer Arena	Moscow, Russia
2024	Brazil	6–4	Italy	Dubai Design District Stadium	Dubai, United Arab Emirates

== Results by nation ==
National team	Final appearances	Winners	Runners-up
Brazil	16	15	1
Portugal	6	3	3
Russia	3	3	0
France	3	1	2
Spain	3	0	3
Uruguay	3	0	3
Tahiti	2	0	2
Italy	3	0	3
Mexico	1	0	1
Peru	1	0	1
Switzerland	1	0	1
United States	1	0	1
Japan	1	0	1

== Results by confederation ==
Confederation	Appearances	Winners	Runners-up
CONMEBOL	20	15	5
UEFA	19	7	12
CONCACAF	2	0	2
OFC	2	0	2
AFC	1	0	1

== See also ==
- FIFA Beach Soccer World Cup
- National team appearances in the FIFA Beach Soccer World Cup
