= 2019 FIFA Beach Soccer World Cup final =

Final match of the 2019 FIFA Beach Soccer World Cup

2019 FIFA Beach Soccer World Cup Final
- Event: 2019 FIFA Beach Soccer World Cup
Italy	Portugal
(Italy)	(Portugal)
4	6
- Date: 1 December 2019
- Venue: Los Pynandi Stadium, Luque
- Referee: Ivo Moraes (Brazil)
- Attendance: 2,847
- Weather: Partly cloudy 29 °C (84 °F); 57% humidity 11 km/h wind speed

The 2019 FIFA Beach Soccer World Cup Final was a beach soccer match which took place on 1 December 2019 at Los Pynandi World Cup Stadium in Luque, Paraguay, to determine the winners of the 2019 FIFA Beach Soccer World Cup. It was the final and hence the last match of the 10th FIFA Beach Soccer World Cup, a biennial competition contested by the men's national teams of the member associations of FIFA.

As the fourth all-European final (following 2001, 2005 and 2013), the match pitted the European champions of 2018 and 2019 respectively against each other: Italy, who had previously competed in one World Cup final, in 2008, and Portugal, who appeared in their third FIFA Beach Soccer World Cup final and their sixth overall when taking into account the pre-FIFA era Beach Soccer World Championships; their last appearance was four years prior in 2015.

In what was seen as an evenly contested affair, Portugal emerged as victors thanks to a series of successful free kicks, clinching the match by six goals to four to win their second FIFA Beach Soccer World Cup crown (following 2015) and third world title overall (including success in the 2001 World Championship), condemning Italy to a second runners-up medal. The match was also notable as the 583rd and final international beach soccer appearance of Madjer; the Portuguese captain, often hailed as the best player of all-time, announced his retirement immediately following the match.

== Background ==
=== World Cup history comparison ===
Both nations are veterans at World Cups, with Portugal missing only one and Italy, two, since their debuts (1997 and 1995 respectively). The former had had considerably more success than the latter.

During the World Championships era, Portugal became champions in 2001 and finished on the podium a further four times (1999, 2002, 2003, 2004). Since the FIFA era began, Portugal have fared relatively similarly, winning the 2015 title, finishing as runners-up in 2005 and earning bronze medals three times (2008, 2009, 2011). This was Portugal's third FIFA final and sixth overall. Italy's best finish of the World Championships was a single bronze medal, in 1996. Italy reached their first final during the FIFA era in 2008, when they lost to Brazil 5–3, and this remained their only podium finish of this era until now. This was Italy's second World Cup final. However, more recently, after neither team qualified for 2013, Italy had reached the semi-finals of the last two editions, one better than their Iberian opponents.

=== 2019 season comparison ===
Season comparison summary
Competition	(Italy)	(Portugal)
World Games qual.	3rd	7th
European Games	5th	1st
Euro BS League	4th	1st
World Cup qual.	2nd	5th
Mediterranean Games	1st	2nd
World Games	4th	DNQ

Both teams had enjoyed generally successful seasons but not without some negatives. As European nations, they had competed in many of the same events.

Portugal failed in qualification for the World Beach Games, but compensated for this disappointment by claiming the gold medal at the European Games and becoming six-time European champions at the Euro Beach Soccer League (EBSL). Despite reaching this final, they narrowly qualified for the World Cup in July, finishing in the final qualification spot, but also won the silver medal at the Mediterranean Beach Games. Portugal were world ranked 4th going into the match.

Italy went into the season as reigning European champions having won the 2018 EBSL and began the year by qualifying for the World Beach Games, where they went on to lose to Iran in the bronze medal match. They only managed a fifth-place finish at the European Games, but claimed fourth in the EBSL and second place in qualification for the World Cup. The Mediterranean Beach Games was their most successful event, where they claimed the gold medal. Italy was world-ranked 3rd going into the match.

=== Previous matches ===
==== At World Cups ====
The teams had gone head-to-head three times previously at World Cups, twice during the World Championships era and once in the FIFA era. The three meetings are documented below:

Date	Tournament	Round	Result
16 January 2002	2002 Beach Soccer World Championships	Group stage	Italy 4–6 Portugal
7 March 2004	2004 Beach Soccer World Championships	Third place match	Portugal 5–1 Italy
21 July 2008	2008 FIFA Beach Soccer World Cup	Group stage	Portugal 5–4 Italy (a.e.t.)
Total wins
Italy		Portugal	
0		3	

==== Recent results (all competitions) ====
The teams had already met on three previous occasions in 2019, with Italy winning two, however Portugal had won the most recent contest. Before then, the teams had not clashed for over two years. However, overall, the two teams had met 48 times previously. The last five meetings are documented in the below table:

Date	Tournament	Round	Result
11 September 2016	2017 FIFA Beach Soccer World Cup qualifiers	Third place match	Italy 3–8 Portugal
9 July 2017	2017 Euro Beach Soccer League Stage 2	Group stage	Portugal 8–5 Italy
26 July 2019	2019 FIFA Beach Soccer World Cup qualifiers	Quarter-finals	Portugal 3–4 Italy
31 August 2019	2019 Mediterranean Beach Games	Gold medal match	Italy 7–5 Portugal
7 September 2019	2019 Euro Beach Soccer League Superfinal	Group stage	Portugal 8–6 Italy
Total wins
Italy		Portugal	
2		3	

== Road to the final ==
Italy
Round
Portugal
Opponent
Result
Group stage
Opponent
Result
Tahiti
12–4
Match 1
Nigeria
10–1
Uruguay
3–4
Match 2
Brazil
7–9
Mexico
6–2
Match 3
Oman
3–1
Group B winners

Team	Pld	W	W+	WP	L	GF	GA	GD	Pts
Italy	3	2	0	0	1	21	10	+11	6
Uruguay	3	2	0	0	1	9	9	0	6
Tahiti	3	2	0	0	1	16	17	−2	6
Mexico	3	0	0	0	3	3	13	−10	0

Final standings
Group D runners-up

Team	Pld	W	W+	WP	L	GF	GA	GD	Pts
Brazil	3	3	0	0	0	29	11	+18	9
Portugal	3	2	0	0	1	20	11	+9	6
Oman	3	1	0	0	2	9	16	−7	3
Nigeria	3	0	0	0	3	8	28	−20	0

Opponent
Result
Knockout stage
Opponent
Result
Switzerland
5–4
Quarter-finals
Senegal
4–2
Russia
8–7 (a.e.t.)
Semi-finals
Japan
3–3 (a.e.t.), (2–1 pens.)

== Match ==
=== Summary ===
Period one began with Portugal on the offensive and Italy on the defensive, the latter's style compared to the Catenaccio tactics classically used by their national football team. Hence, the Portuguese were the team creating the goal-scoring opportunities and dominating play, but on six minutes, Italy scored against the run of play – after a shot from Madjer (Portugal's twelfth of the match), Corosiniti played a ball through the middle to Zurlo who slotted home Italy's first shot of the match. 90 seconds later, Chiavaro fouled Leo Martins up against the touchline, just outside the Italian penalty area. The Portuguese smashed his free kick into the bottom left hand corner to equalise the score. Portugal continued to dominate, having over 70% possession of the ball, but Italy began creating opportunities of their own as the period neared its end. After an injury timeout following Corosiniti and Belchior's clash, the period concluded with the score still level at 1–1.

The second period started with a more even spread of chances for both teams. Del Mestre was forced into good saves from Jordan and then Be Martins, whilst, Gori and Zurlo saw their free kicks go narrowly wide for Italy. In the sixth minute, the deadlock was broken. Leo Martins won possession just inside his own half and lead Portugal on a quick counterattack, ultimately squaring the ball to an unmarked Jordan in the middle who fired home at the edge of the box. 30 seconds after the restart, Jordan won a long-range free kick, with his effort saved by a diving Del Mestre. However, the Italian mistakenly parried the ball back into the centre of the box; with the goal left undefended, Lourenço pounced onto the loose ball for a tap in, putting Portugal up 3–1. Despite the two goal gap, the game remained balanced as the second half of period two progressed; Leo Martins wasted a great chance, a one-on-one opportunity against the goalkeeper, shooting wide.

Jordan converted a powerful free kick from the centre of the pitch during the opening stages of period three to open up a 4–1 lead for Portugal. This deficit saw Italy become more offensive to try and bridge the gap. One minute later, Jordan was guilty of a foul on Gori, conceding a penalty, but the Italian's spot kick attempt was saved by Andrade. The attacking play of Italy began opening up more spaces for Portugal to exploit. Soon after, Leo Martins completed a brace from a free kick given away by Marinai just outside the Italian box, extending the Portuguese lead to 5–1 with just eight minutes left on the clock. Protests surrounding the foul lead to a flurry of yellow cards, for Jordan, Del Mestre and Chiavaro. After a Corosiniti effort hit the post, Italy scored two goals inside the 31st minute. First a one-two between Zurlo and Ramacciotti saw the latter slotting past Andrade at close range. And then from Ramacciotti's corner, Josep Junior ran from deep to head in at the back post for 5–3, reigniting the match as a contest, seeing Portugal take a more cautious approach into the final minutes. Gori almost made it 5–4 with two minutes left, hitting a bicycle kick against the post, but a controversial foul by Ramacciotti mere seconds later (for which he was booked) allowed Jordan to complete his hat-trick via the free kick. Italy's remaining efforts proved futile, save for a final attempt by Ramacciotti through Andrade's legs mere seconds from full time. But the goal bothered Portugal not as they knew they had won the game , and as the last seconds ticked by, the TV cameras were already focused on Madjer on the Portuguese bench who had begun crying.

=== Details ===
1 December 2019
18:00 PYST (UTC−3)

Italy	4–6	Portugal
Zurlo 6'; Ramacciotti 31', 36'; Josep Jr. 31'	Report	L. Martins 8', 28'; Jordan 18', 26', 35'; Lourenço 18'

Los Pynandi Stadium, Luque
Attendance: 2,847
Referee: Ivo Moraes (Brazil)

Italy	Portugal

Starting line up:
GK	1	Simone Del Mestre	(yellow card) 28'
MF	2	Josep Junior
DF	4	Alfioluca Chiavaro	(yellow card) 28'
MF	7	Dario Ramacciotti	(yellow card) 35'
FW	10	Gabriele Gori
Substitutes:
FW	3	Marcello Percia Montani		Substituted on
MF	5	Alessio Frainetti		Substituted on
MF	6	Simone Marinai		Substituted on
DF	8	Francesco Corosiniti (c)		Substituted on
FW	9	Emmanuele Zurlo		Substituted on
MF	11	Paolo Palmacci		Substituted on
GK	12	Andrea Carpita		Substituted on
Manager:
(Italy) Emiliano Del Duca

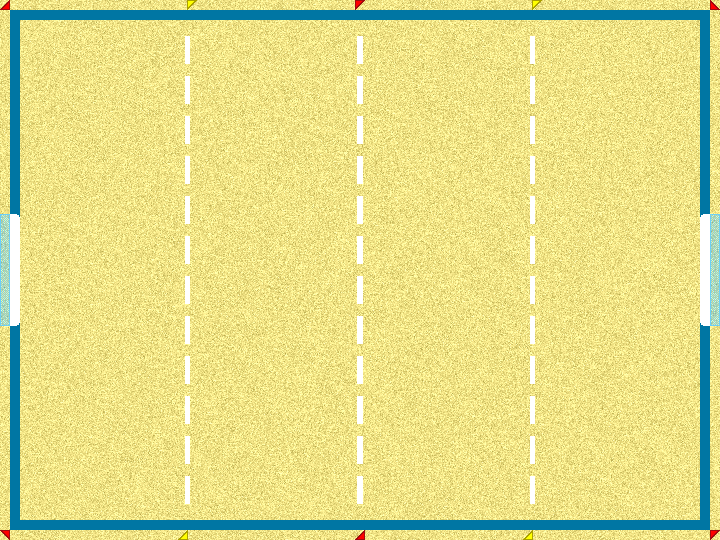
Starting line-ups

Starting line up:
GK	12	Elinton Andrade
DF	2	Rui Coimbra
MF	5	Jordan Santos	(yellow card) 28'
MF	8	Bê Martins
FW	11	Léo Martins
Substitutes:
GK	1	Tiago Petrony
DF	3	André Lourenço		Substituted on
DF	4	Bruno Torres		Substituted on
MF	6	Rúben Brilhante
MF	7	Madjer (c)		Substituted on
FW	9	João Gonçalves		Substituted on
FW	10	Belchior	(yellow card) 30'	Substituted on
Manager:
(Portugal) Mário Narciso

Key:
(substituted on) – substitute came on during the game
(yellow card) – booked

Second referee:
Said Hachim (Madagascar)
Third referee:
Ingilab Mammadov (Azerbaijan)
Timekeeper:
Sofien Benchabane (France)
Reserve assistant referee:
Suhaimi Mat Hassan (Malaysia)
Match commissioner:
Paria Shahriyari (Iran)
General coordinator:
Josep Ponset (Spain)

Match rules:

- 36 minutes; 3 periods of 12 minutes.
- 3 minutes of extra time if scores level.
- Best of 3 penalty shoot-out if scores still level.
- 7 substitutes named, of which all may be used; rolling substitutions.

=== Statistics ===
Stat	Italy	Portugal
Goals scored	4	6
Total shots	45	44
Shots on target	18	17
Shots off target	17	17
Shots blocked	10	10
Shots against woodwork	2	0
Ball possession	46%	54%
Overhead kicks	7	8
Corner kicks	10	4
Fouls committed	7	9
Yellow cards (yellow card)	3	2
Red cards (red card)	0	0
Penalties (scored)	1 (0)	0 (0)
Attempts from free kicks	5	7
Own goals	0	0

== Post-match ==
=== Tournament awards ===
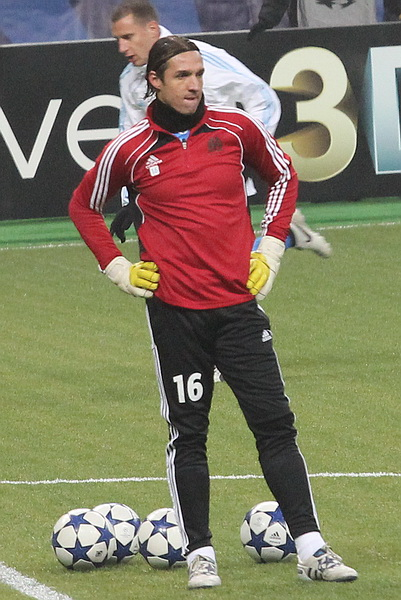
Portugal's Elinton Andrade was crowned best goalkeeper.

When the individual awards were presented at the conclusion of the final, players of the final's competing teams, Italy and Portugal, mopped up those on offer, claiming five of the seven available. Italy's Gabriele Gori and Emmanuele Zurlo won the Golden and Silver Scorer awards respectively, whilst Portugal's Jordan Santos, Bê Martins and Elinton Andrade won the Silver, Bronze Balls and Golden Glove awards respectively.

=== Quotes from participants ===
Players and staff made analytic comments to the media after the match, including:

Italian silver shoe winner, Emmanuele Zurlo:

I am really proud of my team-mates. In the end, we have the bitterness of not having won the final, it will always be there, the truth is that we had a great tournament and we need to be happy to have gone all the way to the final. We’ve shown the world what kind of team Italy is, that we are capable of beating anyone, but in the end Portugal were deserved champions and were better.

Portuguese coach, Mário Narciso:

The games between Portugal and Italy are always very divided. The teams are very equal, but of course I was hoping we could win. At this moment what is in my soul is a great joy, not only for me but also for those who are in the dressing room... the feeling that I made my contribution to this achievement is amazing. It was a dream year, we had a lot of victories! It won't be easy to match.

Top scorer of the final, Jordan Santos of Portugal:

The key to our success was playing well in the crucial matches. This is an experienced squad, full of players who knew what it was like to be crowned champions, and that made the difference.

This is the perfect way to end a fantastic year, bearing in mind we also won the Euro Beach Soccer League and the European Games. It’s a great source of pride to represent your country in such a way. I don’t think I’ll sleep with the trophy, as it’s a bit hard, but maybe I’ll do it with the medal!

=== Madjer's retirement ===
After the trophy ceremony, Portuguese captain, Madjer, clarified his tears at the final whistle as "farewell tears"; he announced his retirement from international beach soccer, aged 42, bringing to an end a 22 year playing career, having claimed eleven individual awards at FIFA editions of the World Cup, as well as being by far the tournament's all-time top scorer with 88 goals and a total of 140 since the 1995 establishment of a world championship for beach soccer. He debuted for Portugal against Chile in the 1998 World Championship, and was the only player to be part of all three of Portugal's title winning teams to date. The announcement came in spite of plans he had recently revealed stating he would retire sometime in 2020. Being widely regarded as the greatest player of all-time, his announcement was met with an outpouring of tributes from fellow players and media outlets.

Madjer revealed the news in an emotional speech to the media:

A big hug to all Portuguese, I thank from the bottom of my heart all the support you have given me throughout my career. I owe a lot to you, I owe a lot to this team, I owe a lot to everyone. Today was my last game... [*begins crying*] ...I want to thank all Portuguese, all my colleagues, coaches, all the staff, people who worked with me until today. To say that I leave happy, fulfilled, proud to be Portuguese, and above all proud of this family that has been building more beautiful beach soccer, with fair play around the world. Thank you, Portuguese pride!

== Aftermath ==
=== Reception in Portugal and Italy ===
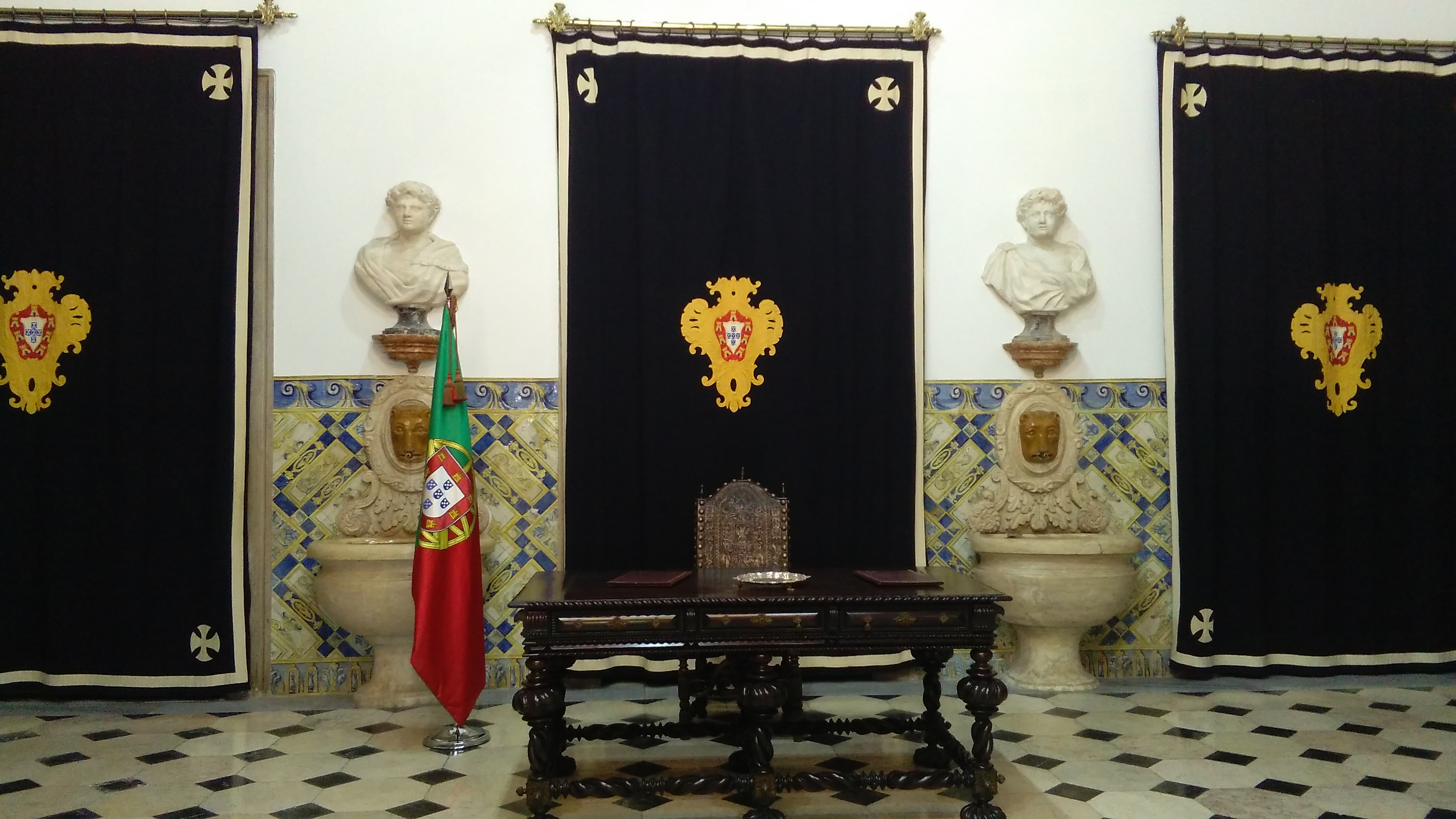
The Sala das Bicas

The Portuguese team subsequently flew home from Asunción the next day, arriving back in Portugal at 07:00 WET on 3 December. Having accepted an invitation, the team then travelled to Belém Palace in Lisbon to meet with the President of Portugal, Marcelo Rebelo de Sousa at 13:45 in the Sala das Bicas. During the meeting, the delegation was commended with civil and national orders – the team's technical staff were awarded the title of Grand Officers of the Order of Merit, the players were bestowed with the title of Commanders of the Order of Merit, and Madjer was knighted, being made a Commander of the Order of Prince Henry. On 4 December, the whole team appeared for an interview on a domestic daytime TV talk show. Coach Mário Narciso, players Madjer and João Gonçalves, team doctor Eduardo Farinha as well as Portuguese Football Federation (FPF) vice-president, Humberto Coelho and directior, Pedro Dias, were received at the 12 December plenary session of the Assembly of the Republic to be honoured by the chamber in recognition of the team's achievements.

Italian Football Federation (FIGC) president Gabriele Gravina and Lega Nazionale Dilettanti (LND) president Cosimo Sibilia, both issued statements congratulating the Italian team on their silver medal and viewed the team's tournament very positively, despite the final loss, noting the increased engagement of new fans and reaffirming their commitments to develop the sport domestically.

==== Broadcasting and viewership ====
Viewership was reported in the days following the final. In Portugal, the match started at 21:00 local time and was broadcast live on free-to-air television channel RTP2, earning an average audience share of 3.2% (~0.16m viewers), peaking with an audience share of 4.9% (~0.24m viewers) at 22:12; this coincided with the final minute of the match. In Italy, the match started at 22:00 local time and was broadcast live on pay television channel Sky Sport, earning an audience share of 0.4% (~0.1m viewers).
