= FIFA Beach Soccer World Cup =

Beach soccer tournament for national teams

- Organiser(s): BSWW; FIFA
- Founded: 2005; 21 years ago
- Region: International
- Teams: 16 (finals)
- Current champions: Brazil (7th title)
- Most championships: Brazil (7 titles)
- Website: fifa.com/beachsoccerworldcup
- 2027 FIFA Beach Soccer World Cup

The FIFA Beach Soccer World Cup is an international beach soccer competition contested by the national teams of the member associations of FIFA, the sport's global governing body. The tournament was preceded by the Beach Soccer World Championships established in 1995 which took place every year for the next decade under the supervision of Beach Soccer Worldwide (BSWW) and its predecessors. FIFA took over the organization of the competition in 2005, rebranding it as an official FIFA event.

Since 2009, the tournament has taken place every two years to allow continental tournaments to flourish without the burden of the World Cup qualifiers crowding the schedule every 12 months. The growing global popularity of beach soccer resulted in FIFA's decision to move the stage of the World Cup from its native home in Brazil to other parts of the globe to capitalise on and continue to stimulate global interest.

The current tournament format lasts over approximately 10 days and involves 16 teams initially competing in four groups of four teams. The group winners and runners-up advance to a series of knock-out stages until the champion is crowned. The losing semi-finalists play each other in a play-off match to determine the third and fourth-placed teams.

The most recent edition in 2025 was held in Victoria, Seychelles, and crowned Brazil as champions for the seventh time – after defeating Belarus 4–3 in the final.

== History ==
The first world cup of beach soccer was held in Brazil, in 1995, organised by the precursors to the modern-day founders of the standardised rules, Beach Soccer Worldwide, held under the title Beach Soccer World Championships. The last edition took place in 2004.

In 2005, FIFA paired up with BSWW to co-organise a new world cup competition under FIFA's name. They kept the tradition of holding the world cup in Rio de Janeiro and continued to allow 12 teams to participate, following on from the 2004 competition. It was Eric Cantona's France that won the competition after beating Portugal on penalties in the final. The tournament was deemed a "major success" and therefore, for the 2006 competition and beyond, FIFA decided to standardise the participants to 16 countries. It was then that the FIFA Beach Soccer World Cup qualifiers were also established that would take place throughout the year.

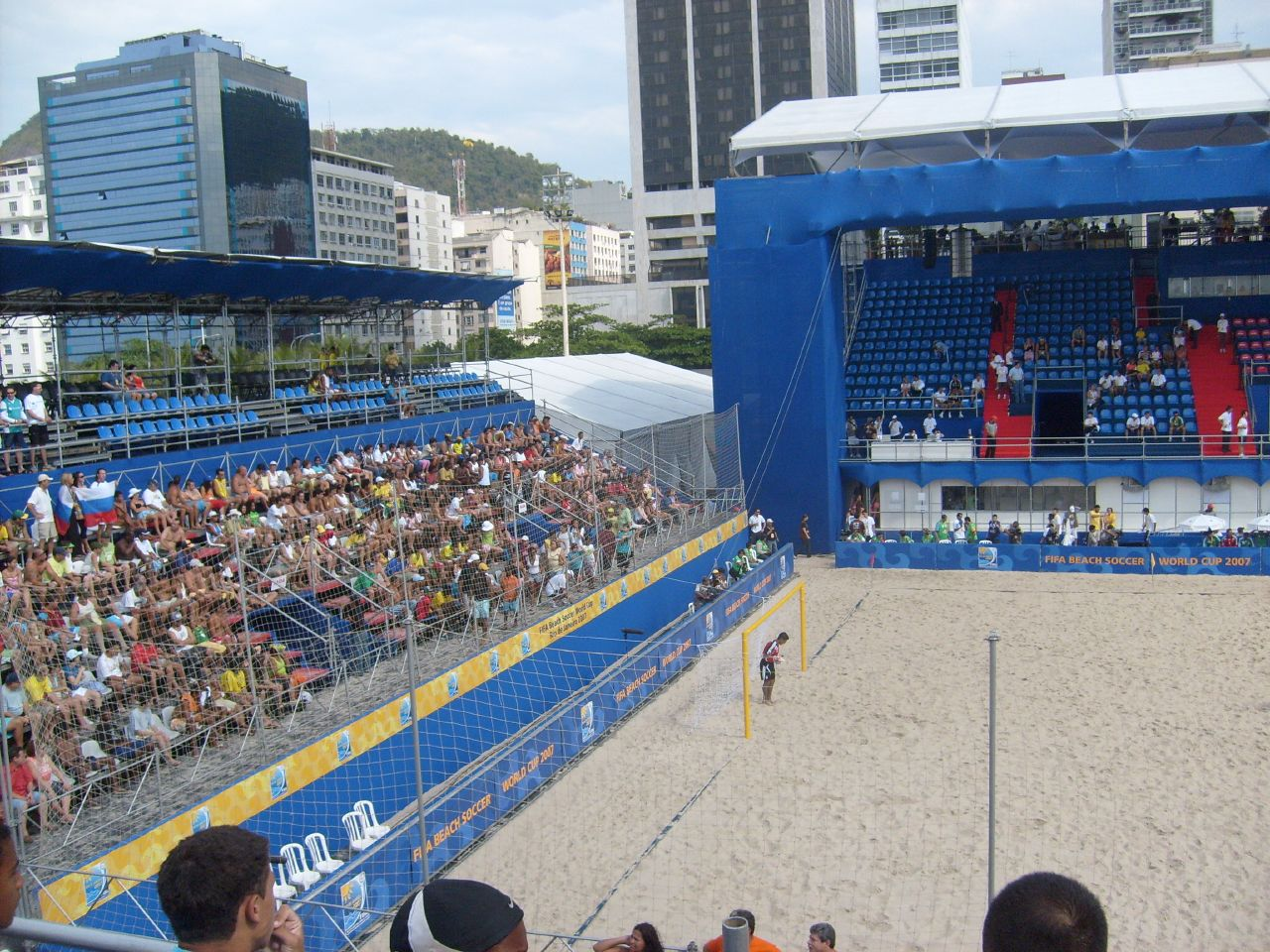
A scene from the 2007 event in Brazil

By the end of the 2007 World Cup, the tournament had become more popular, with the FIFA board taking over the competition, driving more countries to recognize beach soccer as a "major" sport. FIFA decided to have a change of venue. It was voted to extend the sport's popularity that the 2008 World Cup would take place in Marseille, France, and the 2009 World Cup would take place in Dubai, United Arab Emirates. These tournaments would be the first to take place outside Brazil. The 2008 competition was the first time that Brazil would have to qualify for the tournament since they weren't the hosts. The 2009 World Cup is the Beach Soccer World Cup's 15th birthday, with Brazil continuing their dominance.

Before the final of the 2009 World Cup, FIFA announced that a new format would see the World Cup now take place every two years, starting from the 2011 World Cup. FIFA justified the decision by stating that they wanted Confederations to have more time to develop the sport, therefore allowing a year in between World Cups for Confederations to organise their own local tournaments. This was a mutual decision between the confederations and FIFA. In March 2010 FIFA confirmed that the 2011 World Cup would take place in Italy and the 2013 World Cup would take place in Tahiti.

In 2013, FIFA extended the FIFA Champions Badge to the winners of the competition, where it was won by Russia.

== Qualification ==
Following the inaugural FIFA tournament in 2005, the number of teams at the finals was increased by FIFA to a record 16 and so the governing body along with BSWW met with individual confederations to set up a standard qualifying process for each world cup by establishing championships for each confederation. The winners of these championships would be crowned the best team in the region, "promoting regional competitiveness, and most importantly act as a consistent method of qualification to the World Cup for the best teams of each confederation. This would also help increase the sport's awareness across the globe and make sure all confederations were represented at the finals at every following World Cup, unlike in the past."

Besides Europe who continued to use the Euro Beach Soccer League as the method of World Cup qualification until 2008, all other confederations hosted their first championships in 2006 in view of the finals later that year.

=== Attendance ===
The allocation of World Cup spots and the number of teams that qualify from their regional championship to the World Cup was decided by FIFA in 2006 as follows:

Confederation	Continent	Qualifying tournament	Amount of qualifying nations	Participating teams in qualification rounds									
Confederation	Continent	Qualifying tournament	Amount of qualifying nations	2006	2007	2008	2009	2011	2013	2015	2017	2019	2021
UEFA	Europe	FIFA Beach Soccer World Cup qualification (UEFA)	5 teams	17^{1}	22^{1}	24	26	27	24	24	28	20	27
CONMEBOL	South America	Copa América de Beach Soccer	3 teams	6	3	7	8	9	9	10	10	10	10
AFC	Asia	AFC Beach Soccer Asian Cup	3 teams	6	6	6	7	11	16	15	14	15	–
CAF	Africa	Africa Beach Soccer Cup of Nations	2 teams	6	8	8	9	9	8	20	15	13	14
CONCACAF	North, Central America and the Caribbean	CONCACAF Beach Soccer Championship	2 teams	5	4	4	6	8	10	16	16	16	12
OFC	Oceania	OFC Beach Soccer Nations Cup	1 team	4	4	–	4	3	3	–	–	5	–
		Total	16 teams	44	47	49	50	67	70	85	83	79	63

As part of the Euro Beach Soccer League

The host country's confederation loses one qualification spot. I.e. since the 2015 World Cup was held in Portugal, they automatically qualified taking up one of the five European spots. Therefore, in the 2015 UEFA qualifiers, only four teams qualified from the championships to join the hosts making the total of five European nations.

As shown in the table, attendance of nations in qualification tournaments generally continues to rise year on year; the total global number of participants has nearly doubled since 2006.

Despite being the premier tournament in most regions, since the primary objective is to qualify to the World Cup, on some occasions teams have not participated due to qualifying to the finals automatically as hosts such as Brazil deferring from the 2007 CONMBEBOL Beach Soccer Championship and Tahiti in the 2013 OFC Beach Soccer Championship.

== Results ==
#	Year	Location	Final			Third place play-off			No. of teams	Goals (match avg.)
#	Year	Location	Champions	Score	Runners-up	Third place	Score	Fourth place	No. of teams	Goals (match avg.)
1	2005; Details	(Brazil) / Copacabana Beach, Rio de Janeiro, Brazil	France	3–3 (a.e.t.) (1–0 p.)	Portugal	Brazil	11–2	Japan	12	164 (8.2)
2	2006; Details	(Brazil) / Copacabana Beach, Rio de Janeiro, Brazil	Brazil	4–1	Uruguay	France	6–4	Portugal	16	286 (8.9)
3	2007; Details	(Brazil) / Copacabana Beach, Rio de Janeiro, Brazil	Brazil	8–2	Mexico	Uruguay	2–2 (a.e.t.) (1–0 p.)	France	16	261 (8.2)
4	2008; Details	(France) / Plages du Prado, Marseille, France	Brazil	5–3	Italy	Portugal	5–4	Spain	16	258 (8.3)
5	2009; Details	(United Arab Emirates) / Jumeirah Beach, Dubai, United Arab Emirates	Brazil	10–5	Switzerland	Portugal	14–7	Uruguay	16	269 (8.7)
6	2011; Details	(Italy) / Marina di Ravenna, Ravenna, Italy	Russia	12–8	Brazil	Portugal	3–2	El Salvador	16	269 (8.4)
7	2013; Details	(French Polynesia) / Place To'atā, Papeete, Tahiti, French Polynesia	Russia	5–1	Spain	Brazil	7–7 (a.e.t.) (1–0 p.)	Tahiti	16	243 (7.6)
8	2015; Details	(Portugal) / Praia da Baía, Espinho, Portugal	Portugal	5–3	Tahiti	Russia	5–2	Italy	16	257 (8.0)
9	2017; Details	(The Bahamas) / Malcolm Park, Nassau, The Bahamas	Brazil	6–0	Tahiti	Iran	5–3	Italy	16	266 (8.3)
10	2019; Details	(Paraguay) / Olympic Park, Luque, Paraguay	Portugal	6–4	Italy	Russia	5–4	Japan	16	286 (8.9)
11	2021; Details	(Russia) / Luzhniki Complex, Moscow, Russia	RFU	5–2	Japan	Switzerland	9–7	Senegal	16	302 (9.4)
12	2024; Details	(United Arab Emirates) / Design District, Dubai, United Arab Emirates	Brazil	6–4	Italy	Iran	6–1	Belarus	16	223 (7.0)
13	2025; Details	(Seychelles) / Roche Caiman, Victoria, Seychelles	Brazil	4–3	Belarus	Portugal	3–2	Senegal	16	288 (9.0)
14	2027; Details	TBD, TBD, TBD		–			–			

=== Teams reaching the top four ===
Overall, 15 of the 42 nations who have ever competed have made a top four finish; four have won the title.

Brazil are the most successful nation, with seven titles. Since the start of the 2010s, their hold on the title has become less apparent, with four of their six successes coming in the 2000s. They are followed by Russia with three titles, Portugal with two titles and France with one title. Brazil and Portugal are the only teams to win a world title before and after FIFA began sanctioning the sport.

No nation has finished in the final four of every tournament since Brazil finished in fifth place in 2015.

Team	Titles	Runners-up	Third place	Fourth place	Total top 4
Brazil	7 (2006*, 2007*, 2008, 2009, 2017, 2024, 2025)	1 (2011)	2 (2005*, 2013)	–	10
Russia	3 (2011, 2013, 2021*)	–	2 (2015, 2019)	–	5
Portugal	2 (2015*, 2019)	1 (2005)	4 (2008, 2009, 2011, 2025)	1 (2006)	8
France	1 (2005)	–	1 (2006)	1 (2007)	3
Italy	–	3 (2008, 2019, 2024)	–	2 (2015, 2017)	5
Tahiti	–	2 (2015, 2017)	–	1 (2013*)	3
Uruguay	–	1 (2006)	1 (2007)	1 (2009)	3
Switzerland	–	1 (2009)	1 (2021)	–	2
Japan	–	1 (2021)	–	2 (2005, 2019)	3
Spain	–	1 (2013)	–	1 (2008)	2
Belarus	–	1 (2025)	–	1 (2024)	2
Mexico	–	1 (2007)	–	–	1
Iran	–	–	2 (2017, 2024)	–	2
Senegal	–	–	–	2 (2021, 2025)	2
El Salvador	–	–	–	1 (2011)	1

Key
* = Hosts

=== By confederation ===
Total times teams played by confederation
	AFC	CAF	CONCACAF	CONMEBOL	OFC	UEFA	Total
Teams	36	23	24	36	13	56	188
Top 8	14	7	5	24	5	41	96
Top 4	5	1	2	12	3	25	48
Top 2	1	0	1	8	2	12	24
1st	0	0	0	7	0	6	13
2nd	1	0	1	2	2	7	13
3rd	2	0	0	3	0	8	13
4th	2	2	1	1	1	6	13

=== Tournament appearances ===
Since the tournament's establishment in 2005, as of the 2025 World Cup, 44 countries have participated over the 13 competitions. Two countries have participated in all World Cups, which are Brazil and Japan. European teams have dominated in unique qualifiers by continent, since 10 of the 44 countries have been from Europe.

Eight countries who appeared in the precursor championships have failed to appear in a FIFA World Cup; Peru (5) appeared in the most competitions without yet attending a FIFA controlled World Cup. Meanwhile, Senegal (9) have appeared in the most FIFA sanctioned tournaments without having ever appeared in the old World Championships before 2005.

Apps	Team	First	Last	Best result
13	Brazil	2005	2025	Champions
13	Japan	2005	2025	Runners-up
12	Portugal	2005	2025	Champions
10	Spain	2005	2025	Runners-up
10	Italy	2006	2025	Runners-up
10	Senegal	2007	2025	Fourth place
9	Argentina	2005	2024	Quarter-finals
9	Iran	2006	2025	Third place
8	Russia	2007	2021	Champions
8	United Arab Emirates	2007	2024	Quarter-finals
8	Tahiti	2011	2025	Runners-up
7	Uruguay	2005	2021	Runners-up
7	United States	2005	2024	Round 1
7	Mexico	2007	2024	Runners-up
6	Nigeria	2006	2019	Quarter-finals
6	El Salvador	2008	2025	Fourth place
6	Switzerland	2009	2021	Runners-up
6	Oman	2011	2025	Round 1
6	Paraguay	2013	2025	Quarter-finals
5	Solomon Islands	2006	2013	Round 1
4	France	2005	2008	Champions
4	Belarus	2019	2025	Runners-up
3	Ukraine	2005	2013	Quarter-finals

Apps	Team	First	Last	Best result
2	Bahrain	2006	2009	Quarter-finals
2	Cameroon	2006	2008	Round 1
2	Poland	2006	2017	Round 1
2	Costa Rica	2009	2015	Round 1
2	Ivory Coast	2009	2013	Round 1
1	Australia	2005		Round 1
1	South Africa	2005		Round 1
1	Thailand	2005		Round 1
1	Canada	2006		Quarter-finals
1	Venezuela	2011		Round 1
1	Netherlands	2013		Round 1
1	Madagascar	2015		Round 1
1	Bahamas	2017		Round 1
1	Ecuador	2017		Round 1
1	Panama	2017		Round 1
1	Mozambique	2021		Round 1
1	Colombia	2024		Round 1
1	Egypt	2024		Round 1
1	Chile	2025		Round 1
1	Guatemala	2025		Round 1
1	Mauritania	2025		Round 1
1	Seychelles	2025		Round 1

Key: Apps – Appearances

== Attendance ==
In all tournaments, one venue was used to host all matches, with the exception of 2009, when two venues were used. (Note: Two venues were used; the larger was used for 24 matches and the smaller was used for six; the latter is from which the lowest gate figure came.)

Year	Location	Stadium capacity	Matches	Total gate	Lowest gate	Highest gate	Average gate	Attendance % (Note: This is the overall attendance percentage for the tournament, from the total possible maximum attendance figure if all matches were at full capacity: total gate / (stadium capacity x matches played).)
2005	Rio de Janeiro, Brazil	10,000	20	110,500	500	10,000	5,525	55%
2006	Rio de Janeiro, Brazil	10,000	32	179,800	800	10,000	5,619	56%
2007	Rio de Janeiro, Brazil	10,000	32	157,300	1,000	10,000	5,525	49%
2008	Marseille, France	7,000	32	176,500	3,000	7,000	5,516	79%
2009	Dubai, United Arab Emirates	5,700 / 1,200	32	97,500	150	5,700	3,047	63%
2011	Ravenna, Italy	5,500	32	119,370	1,000	5,500	3,730	68%
2013	Papeete, Tahiti, French Polynesia	4,200	32	109,650	1,100	4,200	3,427	82%
2015	Espinho, Portugal	3,500	32	96,300	1,600	3,500	3,009	86%
2017	(The Bahamas) Nassau, Bahamas	3,500	32	57,450	400	3,500	1,795	51%
2019	Luque, Paraguay	2,847	32	34,997	216	2,847	1,094	38%
2021	Moscow, Russia	(Note: The actual capacity of the stadium was approximately 4,500. However, it was restricted to an official maximum of 2,500 in order to accommodate social distancing measures due to the effects of the COVID-19 pandemic in Russia.)2,500	32	53,149	472	2,500	1,661	66%
2024	Dubai, United Arab Emirates	3,458	32	72,893	711	3,458	2,278	66%
2025	Victoria, Seychelles	3,572	32	79,736	795	3,572	2,492	70%
Overall (2005–2025)			404	1,345,145	150	10,000	3,330	63%

== See also ==
- FIFA Beach Soccer World Cup records and statistics

== Notes ==
1. At the 2021 edition, in accordance with a ban by the World Anti-Doping Agency (WADA) and a decision by the Court of Arbitration for Sport (CAS), the team from Russia was not permitted to use the Russian name, flag, or anthem; it participated in the World Cup as "the team of the Russian Football Union (RFU)", and used the flag of the Russian Olympic Committee. For the purpose of continuity in this article, the results of the RFU team in 2021 are considered as de facto results of the Russian national team.
