= 2017 FIFA Beach Soccer World Cup final =

Final match of the 2017 FIFA Beach Soccer World Cup

2017 FIFA Beach Soccer World Cup Final
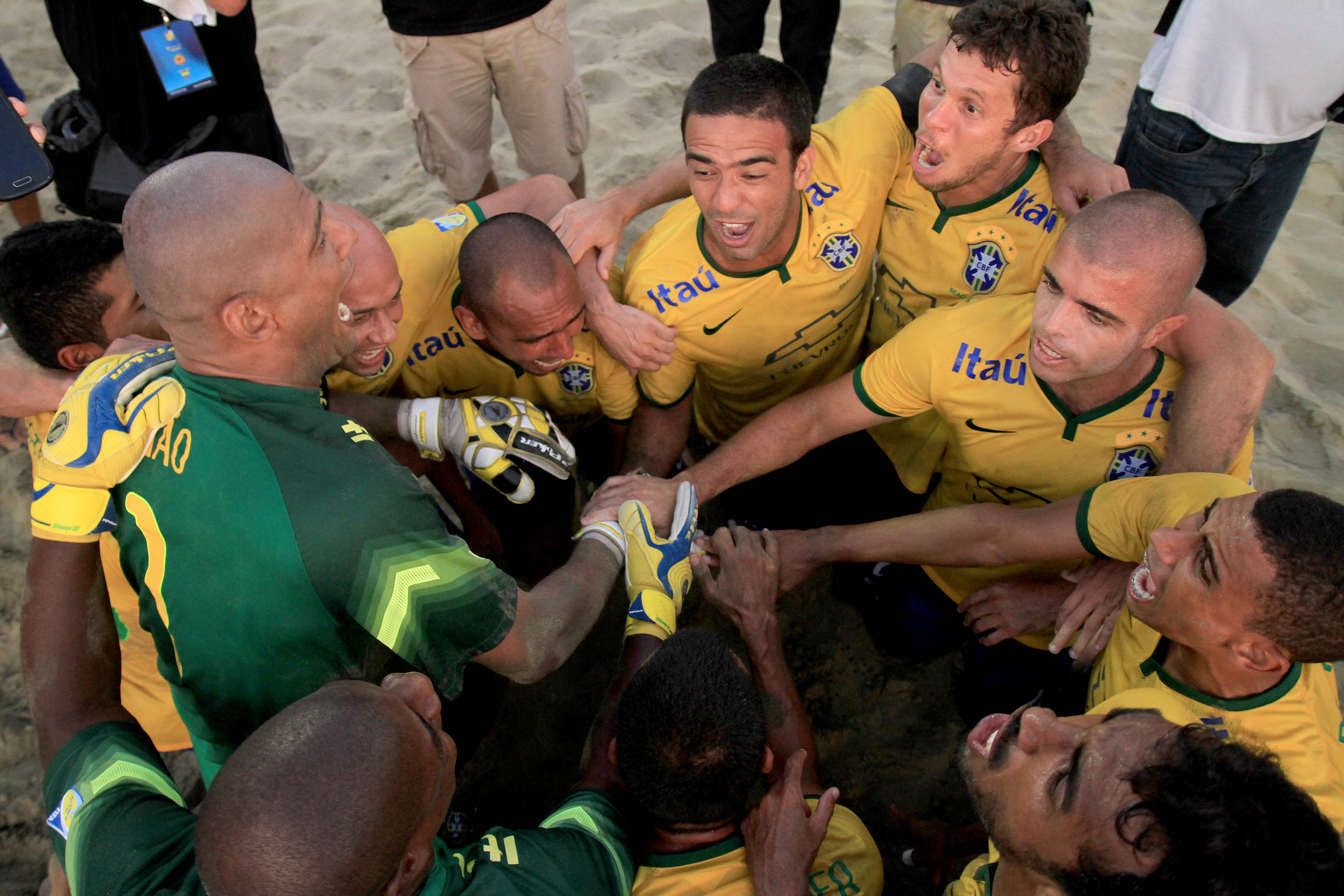
- Brazil (pictured here in 2015) won their fifth FIFA crown
- Event: 2017 FIFA Beach Soccer World Cup
Tahiti	Brazil
(French Polynesia)	(Brazil)
0	6
- Date: 7 May 2017
- Venue: National Beach Soccer Arena, Nassau
- Referee: Bakhtiyor Namazov (Uzbekistan)
- Attendance: 3,500
- Weather: Sunny; 27 °C (81 °F); 46% humidity 10 m/s wind speed

The 2017 FIFA Beach Soccer World Cup Final was the last match of the 2017 FIFA Beach Soccer World Cup which took place on May 7, 2017 at the National Beach Soccer Arena in Nassau, the Bahamas. The final was contested between Tahiti, who had previously competed in one World Cup final, the last World Cup final in 2015 which they lost to Portugal, and Brazil, who were back into a World Cup final after their last appearance six years ago in 2011, their sixth FIFA Beach Soccer World Cup final and their 15th overall when taking into account the pre-FIFA era Beach Soccer World Championships, beating the defending champions Portugal on their way to this year's final.

Brazil competently won the final by 6 unanswered goals to win their fifth FIFA Beach Soccer World Cup and 14th world title overall since 1995, their first title for eight years since defeating Switzerland in the 2009 final. This condemned Tahiti to two successive World Cup final losses and the islanders became only the second team ever to fail to score in a World Cup final after Uruguay in 1996.

== Background ==
Going into the match, Tahiti were still a relatively new beach soccer nation having only first competed in 2006 and at their first World Cup in 2011, however had gained experience and solidified their place as a top team having reached three consecutive World Cup semi finals in doing so at this year's tournament and now two consecutive World Cup finals too after losing to hosts Portugal 5–3 in the last occurring World Cup final, in 2015. Tahiti were also world ranked 6th prior to the match.

Comparatively, Brazil have dominated the international beach soccer scene since the start of the World Championships in 1995 and until 2009 appeared in 13 of the 15 finals played (4 of 5 FIFA finals), winning all 13. However since then the Brazilian team have experienced a gradual decline at the World Cups, losing in a final for the first time in 2011 at the hands of Russia, only reaching the semi-finals in 2013 and most notably, for the first time ever, not even finishing in a top 4 position in 2015, losing in the quarter-finals. However since losing that match in 2015 Brazil have been on a 34 match winning streak in all competitions leading up to this match, their first final in six years, finally ending their final drought. Brazil were world ranked 3rd prior to the match.

Before the final, the teams had met on three previous occasions, twice at the World Cup, first in 2013 and at this very World Cup as they were both in Group D. The three meetings are documented in the below table:

Previous matches

Date	Tournament	Round	Result
28 September 2013	2013 FIFA Beach Soccer World Cup	Third place play-off	Brazil 7–7 Tahiti, (1–0 pens.)
3 November 2016	2016 Intercontinental Cup	Group stage	Tahiti 4–10 Brazil
28 April 2017	2017 FIFA Beach Soccer World Cup	Group stage	Brazil 4–1 Tahiti
Total wins
Tahiti		Brazil	
0		3	

== Road to the final ==
Tahiti
Round
Brazil
Opponent
Result
Group stage
Opponent
Result
Brazil
1–4
Match 1
Tahiti
4–1
Japan
4–3
Match 2
Poland
7–4
Poland
8–4
Match 3
Japan
9–3
Group D runners-up

Team	Pld	W	W+	L	GF	GA	GD	Pts
Brazil	3	3	0	0	20	8	+12	9
Tahiti	3	2	0	1	13	11	+2	6
Japan	3	1	0	2	15	17	−2	3
Poland	3	0	0	3	12	24	−12	0

Final standings
Group D winners

Team	Pld	W	W+	L	GF	GA	GD	Pts
Brazil	3	3	0	0	20	8	+12	9
Tahiti	3	2	0	1	13	11	+2	6
Japan	3	1	0	2	15	17	−2	3
Poland	3	0	0	3	12	24	−12	0

Opponent
Result
Knockout stage
Opponent
Result
Paraguay
6–4
Quarter-finals
Portugal
4–3
Iran
1–1 (a.e.t.), (3–2 pens.)
Semi-finals
Italy
8–4

== Match details ==
=== Summary ===
With 2,000 Tiki Toa fans gathered in front of a giant screen back home in Tahiti, Brazil's Mauricinho opened the scoring after a mere 14 seconds following intercepting Zaveroni's misplaced pass, finishing through the legs of Torohia, and then assisted Datinha to comfortably take a 2–0 lead into the break after the first period. Despite opportunities for Tahiti and a considerable amount of ball possession, Brazil's defence stood firm and limited the shots on target for the islanders, preventing a golden chance for Zavaroni being converted.

Pressing the ball and hitting on the counter attack saw Brazil take further control at the halfway stage of the match in the second period as Mauricinho converted another for a brace to score the only goal of the second set of 12 minutes. Tahiti and Brazil both hit the crossbar but although wayward marking in the Tahitian defence presented a number of chances for Brazil and the islanders also tested goalkeeper Mão, both teams failed to register any new goals on the scoreboard.

Despite Tahiti's Heimanu hitting the post and Labaste striking the crossbar in the opening moments of the final 12 minutes, and surviving some defensive mistakes, Les Tiki Toa finally found themselves exposed and tiring at the back in the third period as Catarino scored a left-footed drive off the post on the counter attack once more to make the score 4–0. As Daniel scored a brace minutes later, first a header from a corner and the second finishing in the top corner from a loose ball at the edge of the Tahitian penalty area, Brazil's lead amassed in 29 minutes at 3–0 was doubled to 6–0 in just 4 minutes as the flood gates opened. The Brazilians went on to see out the final minutes to ease to another world title, the 100th international beach soccer trophy in their history.

=== Post-match quotes ===
Brazilian captain Bruno Xavier:

"I'm very proud to be a part of it. We are more than a group of players, of men, we are a team that gave the life for this title to honor the name of our country. We are Brazil, we are five-time champions of the world, I am very happy that we can take that conquest back to our country"

Scorer of Brazil's first and third goals, Mauricinho:

"It still hasn’t sunk in, to be honest it’s a dream come true. Ever since I was a kid, I dreamt about playing beach soccer and being a world champion. To do that, and also win the silver ball is a dream come true."

Tahitian goalkeeper, Jonathan Torohia:

"They were a step above us for sure. For us, we didn't start well, so at the start of the match we weren't confident. It was really hard. Brazil deserve the World Cup."

"It's difficult. Two times we have lost the final of a World Cup. But today there are no regrets from us. Brazil was too strong. Even if we made some mistakes. In one year they played so many matches and never lost. We are happy. Brazil stopped us and they were the only team who beat us."

=== Details ===
7 May 2017
16:30

Tahiti	0–6	Brazil
	Report	Mauricinho 1', 18'; Datinha 7'; Catarino 30'; Daniel 32', 33'

Nassau Stadium, Nassau
Attendance: 3,500
Referee: Bakhtiyor Namazov (Uzbekistan)

Tahiti	Brazil

Starting line up:
GK	1	Jonathan Torohia
DF	4	Heimanu Taiarui
MF	6	Patrick Tepa
MF	7	Raimana Li Fung Kuee (c)
MF	11	Teva Zavaroni
Substitutes:
DF	2	Angelo Tchen (substituted on)
DF	3	Ariihau Teriitau
MF	5	Raimoana Bennett (substituted on)
MF	8	Heiarii Tavanae (substituted on)
FW	9	Naea Bennett (absent)^{†}
FW	10	Tearii Labaste (substituted on)
GK	12	Franck Revel
Manager:
(French Polynesia) Teiva Izal

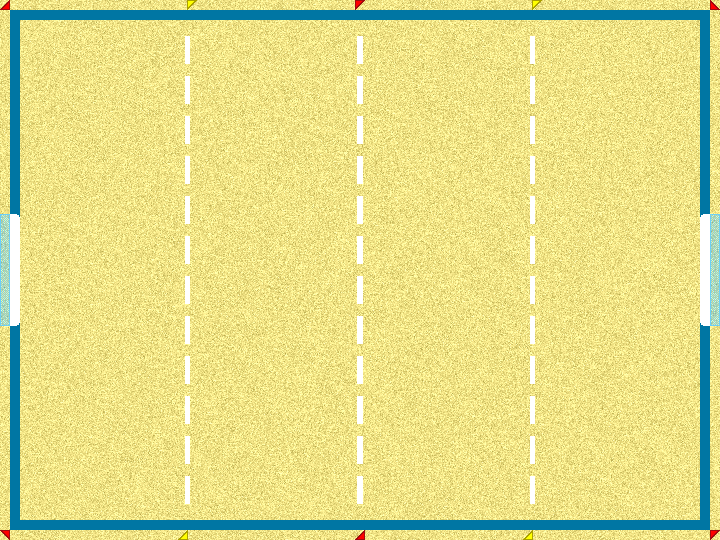
Starting line-ups
Both sides played a 1-1-2-1 formation

Starting line up:
GK	1	Mão
DF	4	Catarino
MF	8	Bruno Xavier (c)
MF	10	Datinha
MF	11	Mauricinho
Substitutes:
FW	2	Fernando (substituted on)
MF	3	Filipe (substituted on)
DF	5	Daniel (substituted on)
FW	6	Lucao (substituted on)
FW	7	Bokinha (substituted on)
FW	9	Rodrigo (substituted on)
GK	12	Rafa Padilha (substituted on)
Manager:
(Brazil) Gilberto Sousa

(substituted on) – substitute came on during the game
† – did not play for religious reasons

Assistant referees:
Łukasz Ostrowski (Poland)
Gionni Matticoli (Italy)
Timekeeper:
Ebrahim Almansory (United Arab Emirates)

Match rules:

- 36 minutes; 3 periods of 12 minutes
- 3 minutes of extra time if scores level
- Best of 3 penalty shoot-out if scores still level
- 7 substitutes named, of which all may be used. Rolling substitutions.

== Statistics ==
Stat	Tahiti	Brazil
Goals scored	0	6
Total shots	52	45
Shots on target	9	20
Shots blocked	21	7
Own goals	0	0
Overhead kicks	16	5
Ball possession	54%	46%
Corner kicks	10	6
Fouls committed	2	0
Yellow cards (yellow card)	0	0
Red cards (red card)	0	0

Source: FIFA
