= Frank Velásquez =

Salvadoran beach soccer player (born 1990)

Frank
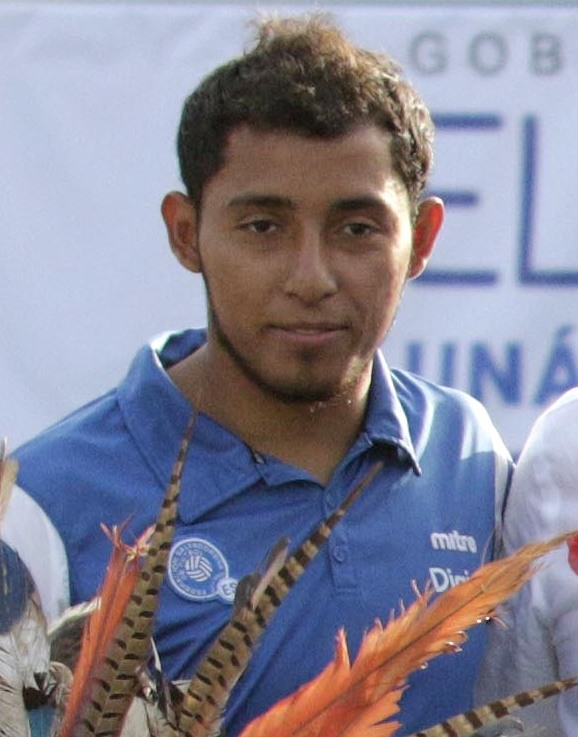
- Frank in 2014.

Personal information
- Full name: Francisco Velásquez
- Date of birth: February 12, 1990 (age 36)
- Place of birth: La Barra de Santiago, Ahuachapán, El Salvador
- Height: 1.65 m (5 ft 5 in)
- Position: Forward

Senior career*
Years	Team	Apps	(Gls)
2009–2010	Once Municipal		
2018–2019	Juventud Cara Sucia		

International career^{‡}
2009–	El Salvador	86	(106)
- * Club domestic league appearances and goals ‡ National team caps and goals as of 21 April 2022

Francisco Velásquez (born February 12, 1990, in La Barra de Santiago, Ahuachapán), also known simply as Frank, is a Salvadoran beach soccer player.

He plays in forward position, and has won awards at the CONCACAF Beach Soccer Championship and FIFA Beach Soccer World Cup for his goalscoring abilities; he has appeared at four editions of the World Cup and scored his 100th goal for El Salvador during the 2021 tournament against Belarus.

== Honours ==
=== Country ===
- FIFA Beach Soccer World Cup
  - Fourth place (1): 2011
- CONCACAF Beach Soccer Championship
  - Winner (2): 2009, 2021

=== Individual ===
- FIFA Beach Soccer World Cup Bronze Ball (1): 2011
- FIFA Beach Soccer World Cup Bronze Boot (1): 2011
- FIFA Beach Soccer World Cup Goal of the Tournament (1): 2011
- CONCACAF Beach Soccer Championship Top Scorer (3): 2010, 2015, 2021
- CONCACAF Beach Soccer Championship Best Player (1): 2010
