= 2011 FIFA Beach Soccer World Cup disciplinary record =

In the 2011 FIFA Beach Soccer World Cup the main disciplinary action taken against players comes in the form of red and yellow cards.

Any player picking up a red card is expelled from the pitch and automatically banned for his country's next match, whether via a straight red or second yellow.

== Disciplinary statistics ==
- Total number of yellow cards: 48
- Average yellow cards per match: 1.71
- Total number of red cards: 1
- Average red cards per match: 0.04
- Total number of red cards via second yellow card: 2
- Average red cards via second yellow card per match: 0.07
- First yellow card: Abdullah Al Qsami – Oman against Argentina
- First red card: Hassan Abdollahi – Iran against Switzerland
- Fastest yellow card from kick off: 0:25 minutes – Tomas Hernandez – El Salvador against Portugal
- Most yellow cards (team): 5 – Senegal
- Most red cards (team): 1 – Iran
- Fewest yellow cards (team): 0 – Argentina
- Most yellow cards (player): 3 – Hamid Ghorbanpour, Pape Koukpaki
- Most red cards (player): 1 – Hassan Abdollahi
- Most yellow cards (match): 6 – Iran against Italy
- Most red cards (match): 1 – Iran against Switzerland
- Fewest yellow cards (match): 0 – Oman against El Salvador, Nigeria against Russia
- Most cards in one match: 6 yellow cards and 1 red card – Italy v Iran

== Sanctions ==
=== By match ===
Note: In this table the "Yellow" column counts only the first yellow card given to a player in a match. If a player receives a second yellow in the same match this is counted under "Second yellow"

Day	Match	Round	Referee	Total cards	Yellow	Second yellow	Straight red
Day 1	Switzerland v Senegal	Group A	(Argentina) Juan Rodriguez	5	5	0	0
Day 1	Italy v Iran	Group A	(Uruguay) Javier Bentancor	7	6	1	0
Day 1	Argentina v Oman	Group B	(Spain) Ruben Eiriz	1	1	0	0
Day 1	El Salvador v Portugal	Group B	(Japan) Tasuku Onodera	2	2	0	0
Day 2	(French Polynesia) Tahiti v Venezuela	Group C	(Hungary) Istvan Meszaros	1	1	0	0
Day 2	Japan v Mexico	Group D	(Poland) Tomasz Winiarczyk	1	1	0	0
Day 3	Iran v Switzerland	Group A	(Spain) Ruben Eiriz	2	1	0	1
Day 3	Senegal v Italy	Group A	(Nigeria) Jelili Ogunmuyiwa	2	2	0	0
Day 3	Portugal v Argentina	Group B	(Russia) Alexander Berezkin	2	2	0	0
Day 4	Venezuela v Nigeria	Group C	(Panama) Oscar Arosemena	2	2	0	0
Day 4	Mexico v Brazil	Group D	(Russia) Alexander Berezkin	4	4	0	0
Day 5	Iran v Senegal	Group A	(Guatemala) Miguel Lopez	2	2	0	0
Day 5	Portugal v Oman	Group B	(Ecuador) Jose Cortez	5	4	1	0
Day 6	Venezuela v Russia	Group C	(United Arab Emirates) Ebrahim Almansory	4	4	0	0
Day 6	Ukraine v Mexico	Group D	(Poland) Tomasz Winiarczyk	1	1	0	0
Day 8	Russia v Mexico	Quarterfinals	(Hungary) Istvan Meszaros	1	1	0	0
Day 8	Portugal v Senegal	Quarterfinals	(Japan) Tasuku Onodera	3	3	0	0
Day 8	Italy v El Salvador	Quarterfinals	(Ecuador) Jose Cortez	2	2	0	0
Day 8	Brazil v Nigeria	Quarterfinals	(Russia) Alexander Berezkin	2	2	0	0
Total				51	48	2	1

=== By referee ===
Referee	Matches	Yellow	Second yellow	Red	PKs awarded
(United Arab Emirates) Ebrahim Almansory	2	4	0	0	2
(Panama) Oscar Arosemena	2	2	0	0	2
(Uruguay) Javier Bentancor	1	6	1	0	2
(Russia) Alexander Berezkin	2	6	0	0	2
(Ecuador) Jose Cortez	2	4	1	0	1
(Brazil) Ivo De Moraes	1	0	0	0	1
(Spain) Ruben Eiriz	3	2	0	1	1
(Madagascar) Said Hachim	1	0	0	0	0
(Guatemala) Miguel Lopez	1	2	0	0	0
(Hungary) Istvan Meszaros	1	1	0	0	0
(Nigeria) Jelili Ogunmuyiwa	1	2	0	0	0
(Japan) Tasuku Onodera	1	2	0	0	2
(Argentina) Juan Rodriguez	1	5	0	0	0
(Poland) Tomasz Winiarczyk	2	2	0	0	1
(Thailand) Suwat Wongsuwan	1	0	0	0	0

=== By team ===
Team	Yellow	Second yellow	Red	Total
Brazil	1	0	0	1
El Salvador	5	0	0	5
Iran	6	1	1	8
Italy	5	0	0	5
Japan	1	0	0	1
Mexico	4	0	0	4
Nigeria	3	0	0	3
Oman	4	1	0	5
Portugal	5	0	0	5
Senegal	5	0	0	5
Russia	2	0	0	2
Switzerland	3	0	0	3
Tahiti	1	0	0	1
Ukraine	1	0	0	1
Venezuela	3	0	0	3

=== By individual ===
Name	Team	Yellow	Second yellow	Red	Total
Hamed Ghorbanpour	Iran	2	1	0	3
Pape Koukpaki	Senegal	2	0	0	2
Rui Coimbra	Portugal	2	0	0	2
Al Seyni Ndiaye	Senegal	2	0	0	2
Giuseppe Soria	Italy	2	0	0	2
Hassan Abdollahi	Iran	1	0	1	2
Khalid Al Rajhi	Oman	1	1	0	2
Yahya Al Araimi	Oman	1	0	0	1
Nasser Al Mukhaini	Oman	1	0	0	1
Abdullah Al Qasmi	Oman	1	0	0	1
Wilber Alvarado	El Salvador	1	0	0	1
Marama Amau	Tahiti	1	0	0	1
Anderson	Brazil	1	0	0	1
Ibrahima Bakhoum	Senegal	1	0	0	1
Nuno Belchior	Portugal	1	0	0	1
Igor Borsuk	Ukraine	1	0	0	1
Farid Boulokbashi	Iran	1	0	0	1
Gian Luca Cardone	Venezuela	1	0	0	1
Francisco Cati	Mexico	1	0	0	1
Francesco Corosiniti	Italy	1	0	0	1
Libasse Diagne	Senegal	1	0	0	1
Miguel Estrada	Mexico	1	0	0	1
Tomoya Ginoza	Japan	1	0	0	1
Gabriele Gori	Italy	1	0	0	1
Paulo Graça	Portugal	1	0	0	1
Tomas Hernandez	El Salvador	1	0	0	1
Bartholomew Ibenegbu	Nigeria	1	0	0	1
Kaspar Jaeggy	Switzerland	1	0	0	1
Mo Jaeggy	Switzerland	1	0	0	1
Nico Jung	Switzerland	1	0	0	1
Francisco Landaeta	Venezuela	1	0	0	1
Ilya Leonov	Russia	1	0	0	1
Aleksey Makarov	Russia	1	0	0	1
Marcos Monsalve	Venezuela	1	0	0	1
Benjamin Mosco	Mexico	1	0	0	1
Ali Naderi	Iran	1	0	0	1
James Okwuosa	Nigeria	1	0	0	1
Musa Najare	Mexico	1	0	0	1
Bruno Novo	Portugal	1	0	0	1
James Okwuosa	Nigeria	1	0	0	1
Paolo Palmacci	Italy	1	0	0	1
Elias Ramirez	El Salvador	1	0	0	1
Agustin Ruiz	El Salvador	1	0	0	1
Walter Torres	El Salvador	1	0	0	1
