= 2011 FIFA World Cup =

The 2011 FIFA World Cup may refer to the following football (soccer) competitions:

- 2011 FIFA Women's World Cup
- 2011 FIFA U-20 World Cup
- 2011 FIFA U-17 World Cup
- 2011 FIFA Club World Cup
- 2011 FIFA Beach Soccer World Cup
