= World Cup final =

The World Cup final generally refers to the FIFA World Cup final. Other World Cup finals may refer to:

- List of Baseball World Cup winners
  - World Baseball Classic winners; the WBC replaced the Baseball World Cup as the sport's primary world championship
- List of Cricket World Cup finals
- List of FIBA Basketball World Cup winners
- List of FIFA Beach Soccer World Cup finals
- List of FIFA Club World Cup finals
- List of FIFA Women's World Cup finals
- List of FIS Alpine Ski World Cup men's champions
- List of FIS Alpine Ski World Cup women's champions
- List of IFAF World Championship winners
- List of Rugby League World Cup finals
- List of Rugby World Cup finals
- List of World Cup of Hockey winners
