= 2011 FIFA Beach Soccer World Cup final =

2011 FIFA Beach Soccer World Cup Final
- Event: 2011 FIFA Beach Soccer World Cup
Russia	Brazil
(Russia)	(Brazil)
12	8
- Date: 11 September 2011
- Venue: Stadio del Mare, Ravenna
- Referee: José Cortez (Ecuador)
- Attendance: 5,500

The 2011 FIFA Beach Soccer World Cup Final was the last match of the 2011 FIFA Beach Soccer World Cup which took place on September 11, 2011 at the Stadio del Mare, in the Italian city of Ravenna. The final took place between Russia, who were taking part in their first ever final and defending champions Brazil, who were playing in their fourteenth final, aiming to win their fourteenth title. The result of the match saw Russia claim the FIFA Beach Soccer World Cup crown, winning their first ever title and becoming only the third team other than Brazil to win the World Cup.

== Roads to the final ==
=== Russia ===
Russia began their World Cup campaign in Group C alongside Nigeria, Tahiti and Venezuela, as European Champions after winning the 2011 Euro Beach Soccer League. Having finished third in the European World Cup qualifiers in July 2010, as well as playing in a group with two surprise nations, who not only were not expected to qualify but had never even competed in a FIFA Beach Soccer World Cup before, quickly made Russia one of the favourites of the competition.

Russia's first match came against Nigeria, who pundits thought would be the only nation to pose any sort of threat to Russia's predicted dominance in the group. Despite Nigeria's enthusiasm and athleticism, Russia were the eventual victors, scoring twice as many goals as their opponents, winning 8-4. Their second match in the group stage came against Tahiti. The Oceanian side defeated regular World Cup participants the Solomon Islands in qualifying to compete in their first ever World Cup, making Russia odds on favourites to win the match, regardless of Tahiti's surprise win against Venezuela in the first round of matches. As expected, Russia controlled the game and steered to a 5-0 victory, ensuring qualification for the quarter-finals. In Russia's final match, they met Venezuela who had already been eliminated from the competition. In an exhibition style performance from both sides, Russia claimed all three points, therefore taking their total to a maximum total of nine points, finishing first in the group.

Having finished first in Group C, Russia met the runners-up of Group D, Mexico in the quarter finals. Having won the North American qualifiers back in December 2010, as well as having finished in second place in the World Cup of 2007, Mexico went into the quarter-finals against Russia, evenly matched. However this was not to be the case. Russia never found themselves behind in the match and went on to win 5-3 to progress to their first ever World Cup semi final. By far the biggest shock in the competition, it would be El Salvador who would play Russia in the semi-finals. The Central American's, who up until now had never even won a game at a World Cup, had beaten Oman and Argentina in the group stage and had even beaten hosts and European giants Italy in the quarter-finals to reach this stage, making Russia huge favourites to reach the final. In spite of El Salvador's efforts, Russia prevailed in a straightforward semi final, winning 7-3, moving on to play in their first ever FIFA Beach Soccer World Cup final.

=== Brazil ===
Brazil started their World Cup campaign in Group D alongside Mexico, Ukraine and Japan, as reigning World Champions as well as being considered the best team in the world, having won the last four FIFA Beach Soccer World Cups and having scored a huge 56 goals in 6 games during qualifying. Brazil were by far the favourites to win a fifth consecutive title.

Brazil's first match was against the surprise champions of the European qualifiers, Ukraine. Despite having beaten the likes of Switzerland and Portugal to win the European qualifiers, many believed it was a stroke of luck that Ukraine were champions of the tournament and therefore it was expected that they would struggle against Brazil. However this was not the case. Ukraine, playing a very defensive game, taking Brazil to a penalty shootout after a 3-3 draw after extra time, but ultimately, after a fantastic performance by Ukraine and an average performance by Brazil, the South American's won the penalty shootout 2-1, taking 2 points away from the game. It was the first time since 2007 that Brazil had been taken past normal time. Brazil's second game was against Mexico. Again, Brazil's performance was below par however their quality was still enough to win the game, 5-2, which all but secured a place in the quarter-finals. The final round of matches saw Brazil take on already eliminated Japan. Although Japan had been convincingly beaten by both Mexico and Ukraine, Brazil once again struggled to dominate as they have dominated games in the past and scraped to a 3-2 victory, finishing top of the group on 8 points.

Having finished first in Group D, Brazil met the runners-up of Group C, Nigeria in the quarter-finals. Having finished second behind Senegal in the African qualifiers, plus having failed to beat giants Russia in the group stage, it was thought unlikely that Nigeria could pose any threat to Brazil. Nevertheless, Brazil's lack of form gave confidence to Nigeria who, in a stunning game, drew the game level at 8 goals all in the final minutes, taking Brazil to extra time; the first time in history that Brazil had been taken to extra time twice in a World Cup. Brazil scored two goals in extra time to win 10-8 and move into the semi-finals. For the third tournament in a row, Brazil met Portugal in the semi-finals. With Brazil's mediocre performances, many believed that Portugal could put an end to Brazil's winning streak of 28 World Cup games. Having already played 4 games, Brazil finally found form when they needed to, coming through to beat their old rivals 4-1 to set up another World Cup final.

=== Summary ===
Russia
Round
Brazil
Opponent
Result
Group stage
Opponent
Result
Nigeria
8–4
Match 1
Ukraine
3–3 (2-1 pens)
Tahiti
5–0
Match 2
Mexico
5–2
Venezuela
7–3
Match 3
Japan
3–2

Team	Pld	W	W+	L	GF	GA	+/-	Pts
Russia	3	3	0	0	20	7	+13	9
Nigeria	3	2	0	1	13	12	+1	6
(French Polynesia) Tahiti	3	1	0	2	6	11	−5	3
Venezuela	3	0	0	3	8	17	−9	0

Final standing

Team	Pld	W	W+	L	GF	GA	+/-	Pts
Brazil	3	2	1	0	11	7	+4	8
Mexico	3	1	1	1	6	8	−2	5
Ukraine	3	1	0	2	8	6	+2	3
Japan	3	0	0	3	6	10	−4	0

Opponent
Result
Knockout stage
Opponent
Result
Mexico
5–3
Quarter finals
Nigeria
10–8 (a.e.t.)
El Salvador
7–3
Semi finals
Portugal
4–1

==== Comparison ====
Russia finished the group stage after 3 conclusive wins, taking a maximum 9 points away from the games, scoring 20 goals and conceding just 7 to have a positive goal difference of 13. On the other hand, the usually dominant Brazil found themselves having 8 points on the board for the first time since 2007, scoring a record low 11 goals, conceding 7, leaving Brazil on a positive goal difference of 4, after some very average games. Despite Brazil's performances, they were still favourites in the final due to there experience in World Cup finals.

== Match details ==
11 September 2011
18:30

Russia	12 – 8	Brazil
Shaykov 2', 6'; Leonov 8', 25'; Eremeev 13', 19'; Makarov 15', 20'; Betinho 21' (o.g.); Shishin 21', 31'; Krasheninnikov 32'	Report	André 8' (pen.), 11', 30', 33', 34', 35'; Betinho 17'; Sidney 22'

Stadio del Mare, Marina di Ravenna
Attendance: 5,500
Referee: (Ecuador) José Cortez

Russia	Brazil

GK	1	Andrey Bukhlitskiy
DF	4	Aleksey Makarov	(yellow card) 11'
DF	7	Anton Shkarin
DF	8	Ilya Leonov (C)
P	9	Egor Shaykov
Substitutes:
GK	12	Alexander Filimonov
DF	2	Yury Gorchinskiy
DF	3	Roman Zaikin
DF	5	Yury Krasheninnikov
W	6	Dmitry Shishin
DF	10	Artur Paporotnyy
P	11	Egor Eremeev	(yellow card) 30'
Manager:
(Russia) Mikhail Likhachev

GK	1	Mão	(yellow card) 31'
P	7	Sidney
DF	8	Souza
W	10	Benjamin (C)
DF	11	Buru
Substitutes:
GK	12	Leandro
DF	2	Anderson
P	3	Fred
DF	4	Betinho	(yellow card) 29'
P	5	Bruno	(yellow card) 28'
W	6	Jorginho	(yellow card) 16'
P	9	André
Manager:
(Brazil) Alexandre Soares

Assistant referees:
István Mészáros (Hungary)
Rubén Eiriz (Spain)
Timekeeper:
Javier Bentancor (Uruguay)
Fifth official:
Óscar Velásquez (El Salvador)

Match rules:

- 36 minutes; 3 periods of 12 minutes
- 3 minutes of extra time if scores level
- Sudden death penalty shoot-out if scores still level
- 7 substitutes named, of which all may be used

== Overall Statistics ==
	Russia	Brazil
Goals scored	12	8
Total shots	38	40
Shots on target	19	25
Own goals	0	1
Overheads	2	0
Ball possession	46%	54%
Corner kicks	5	4
Free kicks	10	9
Fouls committed	11	10
Yellow cards (yellow card)	2	4
Red cards (red card)	0	0

== See also ==
- 2011 FIFA Beach Soccer World Cup

== Sources ==
- Igor Rabiner (2011-09-13). "Репетиция-2018" [Rehearsal 2018] (in Russian). Sport Express.
