= Angelo Schirinzi =

Swiss beach soccer player and coach (born 1972)

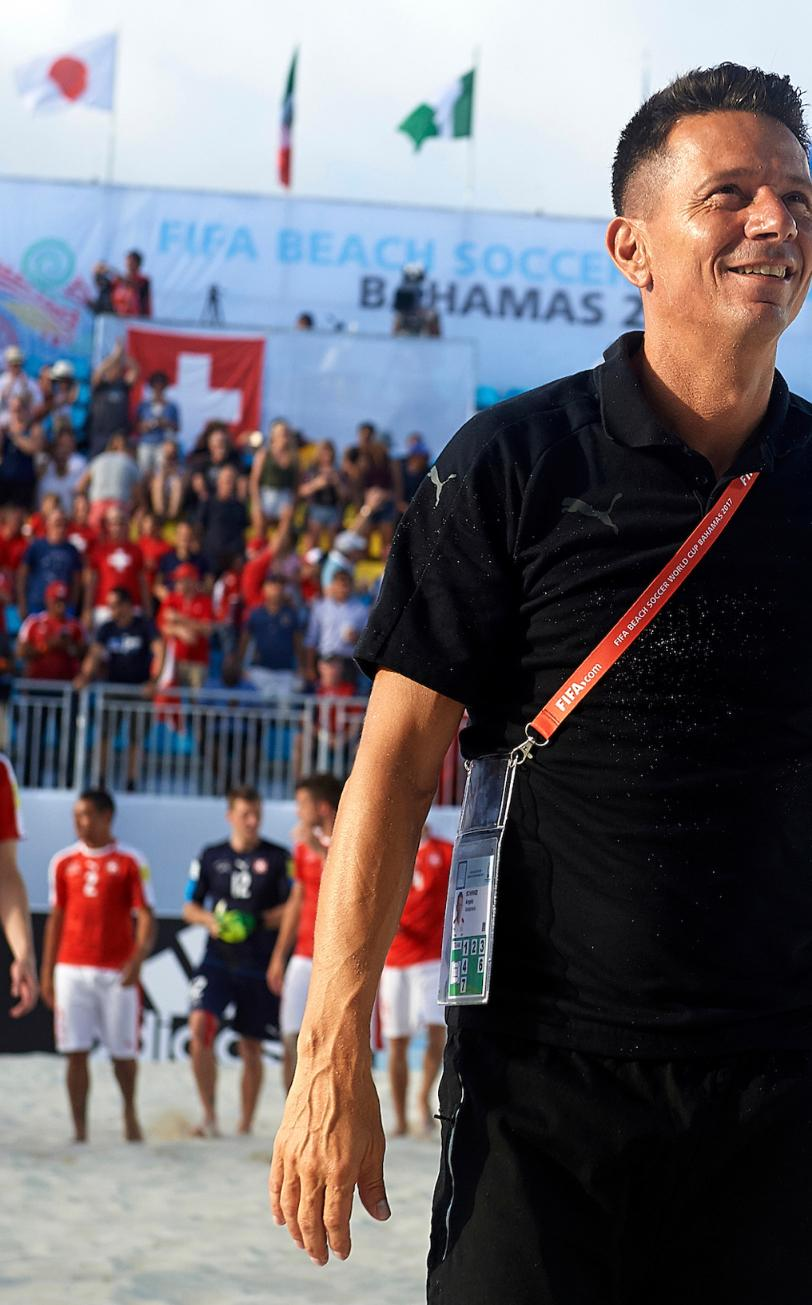
- Schirinzi in 2013
- Born: 5 November 1972 (age 53); Basel, Switzerland
- Occupations: Beach soccer player and coach
- Years active: 2001–present
- Employer: Swiss Beach Soccer GmbH (partner)
- Known for: Developing beach soccer in Switzerland; coaching Switzerland and Tahiti national teams; FIFA beach soccer instructor
- Title: Head coach, Switzerland national beach soccer team
- Military career
- Allegiance: French Polynesia
- Rank: Knight
- Awards: Order of Tahiti Nui (Knight, 2013)

Angelo Schirinzi (born 5 November 1972) is a beach soccer player and coach. He is Coach of Switzerland national beach soccer team, and the former Tahiti national beach soccer team Coach 2012-2015. He is the main developer of beach soccer in Switzerland.

Schirinzi has been a FIFA Expert since 2008 and has supervised more than 35 seminars in the last years.

== Biography ==
Schirinzi was born in Basel. He was a professional footballer until the age of 26. During his short grass career, he played for FC Riehen and FC Solothurn. He then switched to being a professional trainer. In 2001, at the age of 30, he switched to playing beach soccer with the Sable Dancers of Bern. He also became coach-player of the Swiss beach soccer team.

Schirinzi has been a FIFA instructor since 2008, UEFA PRO coach and partner of Swiss Beach Soccer GMBH, the company that manages beach soccer in Switzerland. He has a UEFA Pro License, wrote the Beach Soccer manual.

After the Swiss team failed to qualify for the 2013 World Cup, Schirinzi accepted the position of coach of the Tahitian national team. He won these 6 preparation matches against France and the Netherlands. Organizer of the World Cup, the Tiki-Toa won an unexpected 4th place. He later won the Swiss championship with his team.

In October 2013 he was appointed a knight of the Order of Tahiti Nui.

Schirinzi is widely regarded as a leading global expert in beach soccer, often referred to as a "beach soccer guru." He has conducted numerous FIFA coaching courses worldwide, including in the Pacific region (e.g., Solomon Islands, Tahiti, Tonga, Fiji), Africa (e.g., Tanzania), and elsewhere, contributing to the sport's global development. He has authored a textbook on beach soccer technique and training.

As of 2025, Schirinzi continues as head coach of the Switzerland national team and serves on FIFA Technical Study Groups, such as for the FIFA Beach Soccer World Cup Seychelles 2025.

== Coaching career ==
=== Switzerland national team ===
Schirinzi has been the long-time head coach (and formerly player-coach) of the Switzerland national beach soccer team, leading them in multiple FIFA Beach Soccer World Cups (as player-coach in 2009 and 2011, player in 2015, coach in 2017 and beyond). During his tenure, Switzerland achieved notable successes, including runner-up at the 2009 FIFA Beach Soccer World Cup in Dubai (their debut), European Beach Soccer League titles (e.g., 2012 champions, and 2022 European champions after a 10-year wait), and a bronze medal at the 2021 FIFA Beach Soccer World Cup in Russia.

=== Tahiti national team ===
From 2012 to 2015, Schirinzi coached the Tahiti national team (known as Tiki Toa), guiding them to a surprise fourth place as hosts at the 2013 FIFA Beach Soccer World Cup. He has continued involvement with Tahiti as a technical advisor/consultant in later years, including during the 2024 FIFA Beach Soccer World Cup qualifiers and events.

=== Club coaching ===
Schirinzi has coached Russian club BSC Kristall, winning multiple titles including the Russian Championship (several times), Nazare Cup, Euro Winners Cup (beach soccer "Champions League"), and Intercup.

== Awards ==
- 2002 Best Scorer EBSL Alanya
- 2002 Best Scorer EBSL Montpellier
- 2002 Top Scorer EBSL North Group
- 2002 Prince Albert Monaco Selection Team
- 2003 Most Valuable Player EBSL Linz
- 2004 8th place X. World Championships
- 2004 Best Scorer EBSL Final Monaco
- 2005 Best Scorer Master Cup Amneville
- 2005 Winner EBSL Group C
- 2005 European Champion Euro Beach Soccer Cup 2005 in Moscow
- 2006 Winner EBSL Linz
- 2006 Winner EBSL Scheveningen
- 2007 Winner Pro Beach Soccer Tour Winterthur
- 2007 Top Scorer Pro Beach Soccer Tour
- 2007 Winner Euro Beach Soccer Nations Cup Linz
- 2007 Best Scorer Euro Beach Soccer Nations Cup Linz
- 2007 Winner EBSL Qualifier Athens
- 2008 Winner 4-Nations Cup Eger (HUN)
- 2008 5th place FIFA Beach Soccer World Cup Qualifier in Benidorm
- 2008 Winner EBSL Group A Lignano (ITA)
- 2008 Winner EURO-Nationscup Linz (AUT)
- 2008 Vice-Champion Euro Beach Soccer Cup in Baku (Azerbaijan)
- 2008 Winner Danubia Cup Bratislava (SLO)
- 2008 Winner South Russian Championship with Rostov in Anapa (RUS)
- 2009 Vice-Champion Euro Beach Soccer Cup in Rome (Ita)
- 2009 Vice World Champion FIFA Beach Soccer World Cup in Dubai
- 2010 Winner EBSL Lignano (Italy)
- 2010 4th place FIFA Beach Soccer World Cup Qualifier 2010 in Bibione
- 2010 Winner EBSL Den Haag (Netherlands)
- 2010 Winner Ge Money Bank Beach Soccer Tour Zurich Main Station
- 2011 Winner EBSL Ravenna (Ita)
- 2011 10th place FIFA Beach Soccer World Cup in Ravenna, Italy
- 2011 Intercontinental Cup Dubai
- 2012 Winner EBSL Terracina, Italy
- 2012 Winner BSWW World Tour Al Jadida, Morocco
- 2012 Winner EBSL Torredembarra, Spain
- 2012 European Champion EBSL Finale Den Haag
- 2013 Runner-up Nations Cup Santos, Brazil
- 2013 Winner EBSL Valence, France
- 2014 Runner-up FIFA Beach Soccer World Cup Qualifier 2014 Jesolo
- 2014 Runner-up Euro Beach Soccer Cup in Baku, Azerbaijan
- 2014 Winner EBSL in Catania, Italy
- 2015 Winner EBSL Siófok, Hungary
- 2015 Winner Thailand Cup, Bangkok
- 2015 4th place European Games in Baku, Azerbaijan
- 2015 Quarter-finals FIFA Beach Soccer World Cup in Espinho, Portugal
- 2016 Winner Copa Lagos, Nigeria
- 2016 Vice Champion FIFA Beach Soccer World Cup Qualifier, Jesolo
- 2016 Runner-up EBSL in Moscow, Russia
- 2016 Winner EBSL Sanxenxo, Spain
- 2016 Winner Kalik Cup Nassau, Bahamas
- 2017 5th place FIFA Beach Soccer World Cup, Bahamas
- 2017 Winner Beach Soccer Cup, Morocco
- 2017 Runner-up EBSL Moscow, Russia
- 2017 Runner-up International Beach Soccer Grand Prix Guangzhou, China
- 2018 Runner-up EBSL Moscow, Russia
- 2018 Runner-up EBSL Baku, Azerbaijan
- 2019 Bronze Medal European Games, Minsk
- 2019 Qualification World Beach Games, Qatar
- 2019 Qualification FIFA Beach Soccer World Cup, Paraguay
- 2020 Runner-up EBSL Superfinal Nazaré, Portugal
- 2021 FIFA Beach Soccer World Cup Moscow, Russia, Bronze Medal
- 2022 Beach Soccer European Championship 2022 Sardegna, Italy (Note: This refers to the 2022 Euro Beach Soccer League title)

=== Awards with other teams than Swiss national team ===
- 2013 Tahiti National Team: 4th place FIFA Beach Soccer World Cup Tahiti
- 2013 Swiss Champion with Sable Dancers
- 2018 BSC Kristall Winner Intercup
- 2018 BSC Kristall Winner Russia Supercup
- 2018 BSC Kristall Winner Nazaré Cup
- 2018 BSC Kristall Winner Russia Championship
- 2019 BSC Kristall Winner Nazaré Cup
- 2019 BSC Kristall Winner Russia Championship
- 2020 BSC Kristall Winner Nazaré Cup
- 2020 BSC Kristall Winner Euro Winners Cup (Champions League of beach soccer)
- 2021 BSC Kristall Winner Russia Championship
- 2021 BSC Kristall Winner Nazaré Cup
- 2021 BSC Kristall Winner Euro Winners Cup (Champions League of beach soccer)
