= 2007 FIFA Beach Soccer World Cup final =

2007 FIFA Beach Soccer World Cup Final
- Event: 2007 FIFA Beach Soccer World Cup
Mexico	Brazil
(Mexico)	(Brazil)
2	8
- Date: 11 November 2007
- Venue: Copacabana Beach, Rio de Janeiro
- Referee: Rubén Eiriz (Spain)
- Attendance: 10,000

The 2007 FIFA Beach Soccer World Cup Final took place between Mexico and Brazil on 11 November 2007 at Copacabana Beach, Rio de Janeiro. Brazil were the winners, winning by eight goals to two. Brazil have beaten fifteen other teams to be crowned 2007 FIFA Beach Soccer World Cup Winners. It was Brazil's second title in a row.

== Roads to the final ==
=== Mexico ===
Mexico started their campaign in group A, along with Brazil, with a tight opening game against Russia, with Mexico eventually seeing them off 2-1 on penalties to earn 2 points. Things were looking bad for Mexico after losing 6-4 to Brazil in the second round of games, putting Russia in the driving seat to take second place in the group and progress to the quarter finals. However, in the final round of games, with Mexico winning 6-3 against the Solomon Islands, and Brazil beating Russia, Mexico sneaked through into the quarter-finals, finishing the group on a meagre 5 points.

Team	Pld	W	W+	L	GF	GA	GD	Pts
Brazil	8	3	2	1	0	19	8	+11
Mexico	5	3	1	1	1	12	11	+1
Russia	3	3	1	0	2	9	6	+3
Solomon Islands	0	3	0	0	3	7	22	-15

As Mexico were the runners-up of group A, they met the winners of group B, Spain in the quarter-finals. Spain were the favorites to reach the semi-finals but, after coming from behind, Mexico produced a surprising win, and clinched the game 5-4, holding their nerve in the final moments. Mexico moved into the semi-finals against Uruguay. The semi-final was, in the end, an easier battle for Mexico. With the score at 2-2 going into the final 5 minutes, the game seemed poised for extra-time. However 3 goals in the 32nd, 35th and 36th minutes meant Mexico finished off their semi-final in style, and secured their place in the final against Brazil.

=== Brazil ===
Brazil started their world cup campaign as defending champions, in group A, along with Mexico, demolishing the Solmon Islands 11-2 in their opening game of the group. Brazil continued to perform well with a 6-4 win against Mexico, however left it late to score 2 goals in the third period to secure the three points. Finally, Brazil met Russia. The game was extremely close, seeing Russia lead 2-1 with three minutes left, but a 33rd-minute goal by Sidney sent the game to extra-time and ultimately, penalties. It was a very nerve-racking shoot-out, seeing seven players from each team take a penalty but in the end, it was Brazil who prevailed, taking the 2 points and denying Russia a place in the quarter finals.

Team	Pld	W	W+	L	GF	GA	GD	Pts
Brazil	8	3	2	1	0	19	8	+11
Mexico	5	3	1	1	1	12	11	+1
Russia	3	3	1	0	2	9	6	+3
Solomon Islands	0	3	0	0	3	7	22	-15

In the quarter-finals, Brazil played the runners-up of group B, Portugal. The two rival nations battled it out in a match full of goals, but it was Brazil's ability to produce goals at any time that saw them beat Portugal 10-7. In the semi-finals Brazil met, 2005 winners, France. It was a simple game for Brazil, winning 6-2, only ever having to deal with French goals in the 1st and 35th minutes, setting up a final with Mexico.

== Match details ==
11 November 2007

Mexico	2–8	Brazil
Villalobos 14'; Plata 36'	Report	André 9', 28'; Bruno 11', 16'; Benjamin 14'; Buru 19'; Betinho 22'; Junior Negão 36'

Copacabana Beach
Attendance: 10 000
Referee: (Spain) Rubén Eiriz

Mexico	Brazil

GK	12	Miguel Estrada
DF	4	Francisco Cati
DF	6	José Luis Navarrete (c)
W	9	Ricardo Villalobos
W	11	Morgan Plata
Substitutes:
GK	1	Héctor Robles
DF	2	Óscar Gonzales (yellow card) 18'
DF	3	Francisco Vargas
P	7	Moisés Salazar
P	8	Alejandro Pozos (yellow card) 17'
W	10	Gustavo Rosales
Manager:
(Mexico) Ramón Raya

GK	1	Mao
P	7	Sidney
DF	8	Junior Negão (c) (yellow card) 17'
P	10	Benjamin
P	11	Buru
Substitutes:
GK	12	Wagner
DF	2	Duda
DF	3	André
DF	4	Betinho
DF	5	Daniel
P	6	Bruno
P	9	Daniel Souza
Manager:
(Brazil) Alexandre Soares

== Overall Statistics ==
	Mexico	Brazil
Goals scored	2	8
Total shots	24	37
Shots on target	15	18
Own goals	0	0
Overheads	0	0
Ball possession	51%	49%
Corner kicks	1	7
Free kicks	5	2
Fouls committed	12	3
Yellow cards (yellow card)	2	1
Red cards (red card)	0	0

== See also ==
- 2007 FIFA Beach Soccer World Cup
