= 2009 FIFA Beach Soccer World Cup final =

2009 FIFA Beach Soccer World Cup Final
- Event: 2009 FIFA Beach Soccer World Cup
Brazil	Switzerland
(Brazil)	(Switzerland)
10	5
- Date: 22 November 2009
- Venue: Jumeirah Beach, Dubai
- Referee: Rubén Eiriz (Spain)
- Attendance: 6,000

The 2009 FIFA Beach Soccer World Cup Final took place between Switzerland and Brazil on 22 November 2009 at Jumeirah Beach, Dubai. Brazil were the winners, winning by ten goals to five. Brazil have beaten fifteen other teams to be crowned FIFA Beach Soccer World Cup 2009 Winners. It was Brazil's fourth title in a row.

== Roads to the final ==
=== Switzerland ===
Switzerland started their campaign in group D, along with winners Brazil, with a close win against the Bahrain, winning 6–5. Switzerland confirmed their place in the quarter-finals by beating Nigeria in their second game 7-2 and taking themselves up to 6 points. In Switzerland's final they lost 4–2 to Brazil suggesting a Brazil win for the final. Therefore, Switzerland finished second in group D.

Team	Pld	W	W+	L	GF	GA	GD	Pts
Brazil	3	3	0	0	23	8	+15	9
Switzerland	3	2	0	1	15	11	+4	6
Nigeria	3	1	0	2	16	21	–5	3
Bahrain	3	0	0	3	9	23	–14	0

As Switzerland were the runners-up of group B, they met the winners of group C, Russia in the quarter-finals. The game was closely tied but Switzerland sealed their victory with a late goal to win 4–2. This saw Switzerland move on to play Uruguay national beach soccer team in the semi-finals. The semi-final was a stronger performance by the Swiss. Going into the third period with a 4–1 lead, they never looked like the team that would lose and despite Uruguay's best efforts, they never even got back on level terms allowing Switzerland to win 7-4 and move on comfortably into the final against 12-time winners, Brazil.

=== Brazil ===
Brazil started their world cup campaign as defending champions, in group D, along with Switzerland, comfortably beating Nigeria 11–5, with a hat-trick from Bruno and seven different scorers in all. Brazil continued to perform with an 8–1 win against Bahrain, the same result as against Japan at this stage of the competition in 2008, with Buru this time claiming four goals. Finally, Brazil finished off with a decent 4–2 win against Switzerland, who they would eventually beat in the final, finishing on top of the group with 9 points.

Team	Pld	W	W+	L	GF	GA	GD	Pts
Brazil	3	3	0	0	23	8	+15	9
Switzerland	3	2	0	1	15	11	+4	6
Nigeria	3	1	0	2	16	21	–5	3
Bahrain	3	0	0	3	9	23	–14	0

In the quarter-finals, Brazil played the runners-up of group C, Italy, who they beat in last years final. Italy may have been up for revenge but despite a challenge for Brazil, a hat-trick from André helped Brazil onto a 6–4 win to progress on into the semi-finals. In the semi-finals Brazil met Portugal, again, at the same stage they did last year. However, despite the epic 5–4 win for Brazil last time, this match was much more one sided and with seven unique scorers yet again, Brazil eased past Portugal, 8–2, to make it to another final.

== Match details ==
22 November 2009

Brazil	10–5	Switzerland
André 6', 23'; Betinho 8', 23'; Buru 8', 15'; Daniel 12'; Benjamin 18'; Sidney 31' (pen.); Bueno 36'	Report	Jaeggy 9'; Meier 30'; Rodrigues 31'; Schirinzi 34'; Stanković 36'

Jumeirah Beach
Attendance: 6 000
Referee: (Spain) Rubén Eiriz

Brazil	Switzerland

GK	1	Mão
DF	3	Bueno
W	7	Sydney
P	10	Benjamin (c)
DF	11	Buru
Substitutes:
GK	12	Alessandro
DF	2	Dino
DF	4	Betinho
W	5	Daniel Souza
P	6	Bruno (yellow card) 11'
DF	8	Daniel
P	9	André
Manager:
(Brazil) Alexandre Soares

GK	1	Nico Jung
W	6	Stephan Leu
W	7	Sandro Spaccaarotella (yellow card) 25'
DF	8	Mo Jaeggy (c)
P	9	Dejan Stankovic
Substitutes:
GK	12	Valentin Jaeggy
DF	2	Samuel Lutz (yellow card) 36'
W	3	Kaspar Jaeggy
DF	4	Dominik Ziegler
W	5	Michael Rodrigues (yellow card) 20'
W	10	Stephan Meier
P	11	Angelo Schirinzi
Manager:
(Switzerland) Angelo Schirinzi

== Overall statistics ==
	Brazil	Switzerland
Goals scored	10	5
Total shots	39	35
Shots on target	20	12
Own goals	0	0
Overheads	1	2
Ball possession	56%	44%
Corner kicks	1	7
Free kicks	7	3
Fouls committed	3	10
Yellow cards (yellow card)	1	3
Red cards (red card)	0	0

== See also ==
- 2009 FIFA Beach Soccer World Cup
