= 2008 FIFA Beach Soccer World Cup final =

2008 FIFA Beach Soccer World Cup Final
- Event: 2008 FIFA Beach Soccer World Cup
Italy	Brazil
(Italy)	(Brazil)
3	5
- Date: 27 July 2008
- Venue: Plage du Prado, Marseille
- Referee: István Mészáros (Hungary)
- Attendance: 7,000

The 2008 FIFA Beach Soccer World Cup Final took place between Italy and Brazil on 27 July 2008 at the Plage du Prado. Brazil were the winners, winning by five goals to three. Brazil have beaten fifteen other teams to be crowned FIFA Beach Soccer World Cup 2008 Winners. It was Brazil's third title in a row.

== Roads to the final ==
=== Italy ===
Italy started their campaign in group B, with a good opening game against the Solomon Islands, winning 7–4. Italy confirmed their place in the quarter-finals, beating El Salvador 4–1 and taking themselves up to 6 points. In Italy's final game they went down 3–0 to Portugal. Italy battled back and took it into extra time at 4–4. It looked to be heading for penalties but a last minute goal by Madjer meant Portugal won the game and the group.

Team	Pts	Pld	W	W+	L	GF	GA	GD
Portugal	8	3	2	1	0	26	10	16
Italy	6	3	2	0	1	15	10	5
Solomon Islands	3	3	1	0	2	14	23	−9
El Salvador	0	3	0	0	3	6	18	−12

As Italy were the runners-up of group B, they met the winners of group A, France in the quarter-finals. As France were the hosts they were the favorites to reach the semi-finals. Surprisingly, Italy went up 5–0. France did all they could to get back into the game but Italy held out. With the final score at 5–2 they moved into the semi-finals against Spain. The semi-final was a different battle. Italy were 1–0 down after just 2 minutes. However 2 goals in 2 minutes meant Italy went ahead for the first time. Again Spain looked threatening bringing it back to 2–2 and 10 minutes later, 3–2. The scoreline continued to change and by the end of normal time the score was 4–4. Extra time was uneventful which meant penalties. Amarelle stepped up and hit the post which meant it was all down to Massimiliano Esposito to finish the job. His first attempt was saved but it had to be re-taken. Esposito hit the ball down the center and sent Italy into the final to face Brazil.

=== Brazil ===
Brazil started their world cup campaign as defending champions, in group D, coming from behind to win by 3 goals to 2 against Spain. Brazil continued to perform with an 8–1 win against Japan and finished the group on top with 9 points after beating Mexico comfortably 7–1.

Team	Pts	Pld	W	W+	L	GF	GA	GD
Brazil	9	3	3	0	0	18	4	14
Spain	6	3	2	0	1	10	5	5
Mexico	3	3	1	0	2	6	12	−6
Japan	0	3	0	0	3	5	18	−13

In the quarter-finals, Brazil played the runners-up of group C, Russia. They went down 3 times to Russia but with a helpful hat-trick from Daniel, Brazil came back to win 6–4. In the semi-finals Brazil met Portugal, who had the 2 top scorers on their side. It was an epic semi-final, although Brazil were always finding themselves having to come from behind. In the 34th minute, Bruno hit a long range shot finding the back of the net sending Brazil into the final. Portugal failed to come back in the final 2 minutes leaving Brazil to win 5–4.

== Match details ==
27 July 2008

Italy	3–5	Brazil
Paolo Palmacci 29'; Roberto Pasquali 33'; Maradona Jr 34'	Report	Bruno 8', 14'; Sidney 21', 23'; André 28'

Plage du Prado
Attendance: 7 000
Referee: (Hungary) István Mészáros

Italy	Brazil

GK	1	Stefano Spada
DF	2	Michele Leghissa
W	5	Simone Feudi
W	7	Roberto Pasquali (c)
W	9	Massimiliano Esposito (yellow card) 22'
Substitutes:
GK	12	Germano Fabro
DF	3	Giuseppe Condorelli
DF	4	Giuseppe Platania
W	6	Giuseppe Soria
DF	8	Francesco Corosiniti
W	10	Diego Maradona Junior
W	11	Paolo Palmacci (yellow card) 11'
Manager:
(Italy) Giancarlo Magrini

GK	1	Mao
W	7	Sidney
DF	8	Junior Negão (c)
W	10	Benjamin
W	11	Buru
Substitutes:
GK	12	Wagner
DF	2	Duda
DF	3	Bueno
W	4	Betinho
DF	5	Daniel
W	6	Bruno
P	9	André
Manager:
(Brazil) Alexandre Soares

== Overall statistics ==
	Italy	Brazil
Goals scored	3	5
Total shots	30	36
Shots on target	15	18
Own goals	0	0
Overheads	2	0
Ball possession	44%	56%
Corner kicks	6	3
Free kicks	4	6
Fouls committed	7	6
Yellow cards (yellow card)	2	0
Red cards (red card)	0	0

== See also ==
- 2008 FIFA Beach Soccer World Cup
