= 2013 FIFA Beach Soccer World Cup final =

2013 FIFA Beach Soccer World Cup Final
- Event: 2013 FIFA Beach Soccer World Cup
| Spain | Russia |
| (Spain) | (Russia) |
| 1 | 5 |
- Date: 28 September 2013
- Venue: Tahua To'ata Stadium, Papeete
- Referee: Serdar Akçer (Turkey)
- Attendance: 4,200

The 2013 FIFA Beach Soccer World Cup Final was the last match of the 2013 FIFA Beach Soccer World Cup which took place on September 28, 2013, at the Tahua To'ata Stadium, in the Tahitian capital, Papeete. The final was contested between Spain, who had never competed in the FIFA final before, and defending champions Russia. Team Russia won the FIFA Beach Soccer World Cup for the second time.

== Road to the final ==
| Spain | | Round | Russia | |
|---|---|---|---|---|
| Opponent | Result | Group stage | Opponent | Result |
| United States | 5–4 | Match 1 | Japan | 4–1 |
| United Arab Emirates | 5–2 | Match 2 | Ivory Coast | 5–2 |
| Tahiti | 4–2 | Match 3 | Paraguay | 4–3 (a.e.t.) |
| Group A winner: Team / Pld / W / W+ / L / GF / GA / GD / Pts; Spain / 3 / 3 / 0 / 0 / 14 / 8 / +6 / 9; Tahiti / 3 / 1 / 1 / 1 / 10 / 9 / +1 / 5; United States / 3 / 1 / 0 / 2 / 13 / 14 / −1 / 3; United Arab Emirates / 3 / 0 / 0 / 3 / 8 / 14 / −6 / 0; Source: Goalzz | | Final standings | Group D winner: Team / Pld / W / W+ / L / GF / GA / GD / Pts; Russia / 3 / 2 / 1 / 0 / 13 / 6 / +7 / 8; Japan / 3 / 1 / 1 / 1 / 8 / 8 / 0 / 5; Paraguay / 3 / 1 / 0 / 2 / 14 / 13 / +1 / 3; Ivory Coast / 3 / 0 / 0 / 3 / 11 / 19 / −8 / 0; Source: Goalzz | |
| Opponent | Result | Knockout stage | Opponent | Result |
| El Salvador | 2–1 | Quarterfinals | Iran | 6–5 |
| Brazil | 2–1 (a.e.t.) | Semifinals | Tahiti | 5–3 |

== Match details ==
28 September 2013
20:30

| Spain | 1–5 | Russia |
|---|---|---|
| Llorenc 24' | Report | A. Shkarin 13'; K. Romanov 16'; Y. Krasheninnikov 18', 31'; D. Shishin 36' |

Tahua To'ata Stadium, Papeete
Referee: Serdar Akçer (Turkey)

| Spain | Russia |

| GK | 1 | Dona |
| P | 3 | Antonio |
| DF | 5 | Juanma |
| DF | 6 | Nico (c) |
| P | 9 | Raul Mérida |
Substitutes:
| GK | 12 | Christian |
| P | 2 | Cintas |
| P | 4 | Fran Mejías |
| W | 7 | Kuman |
| DF | 8 | Pajón |
| W | 10 | Llorenc |
| P | 11 | Sidi |
Manager:
(Spain) Joaquín Alonso

| GK | 1 | Andrey Bukhlitskiy |
| W | 4 | Alexey Makarov |
| DF | 7 | Anton Shkarin |
| DF | 8 | Ilya Leonov (c) |
| P | 9 | Egor Shaykov |
Substitutes:
| GK | 12 | Danila Ippolitov |
| DF | 3 | Kirill Romanov |
| DF | 5 | Yury Krasheninnikov |
| W | 6 | Dmitry Shishin |
| P | 10 | Anatoly Peremitin |
| P | 11 | Egor Eremeev |
Manager:
(Russia) Mikhail Likhachev

Assistant referees:
Christian Zimmermann (Switzerland)
Hugo Pado (Solomon Islands)
Timekeeper:
Bakhtiyor Namazov (Uzbekistan)
Fifth official:
Mariano Romo (Argentina)

Match rules:

- 36 minutes; 3 periods of 12 minutes
- 3 minutes of extra time if scores level
- Sudden death penalty shoot-out if scores still level
- 7 substitutes named, of which all may be used

== Overall Statistics ==
| | Spain | Russia |
|---|---|---|
| Goals scored | 1 | 5 |
| Total shots | 28 | 27 |
| Shots on target | 9 | 14 |
| Own goals | 0 | 0 |
| Overheads | 4 | 2 |
| Ball possession | 49% | 51% |
| Corner kicks | 1 | 7 |
| Free kicks | 5 | 1 |
| Fouls committed | 3 | 5 |
| Yellow cards (yellow card) | 0 | 0 |
| Red cards (red card) | 0 | 0 |
