= Bruno (beach soccer) =

Brazilian beach soccer player

Bruno Malias
Personal information
- Full name: Bruno Malias Mendes
- Date of birth: 29 March 1980 (age 46)
- Place of birth: Rio de Janeiro, Brazil
- Height: 1.87 m (6 ft 1 1/2 in)
- Position: Forward

Senior career*
Years	Team	Apps	(Gls)
2009–2010	Milano Beach Soccer		
2010	Sporting Portugal (beach soccer)		
2010	Boca Juniors (beach soccer)		
2011	Botafogo (beach soccer)		
2012	Santos FC (beach soccer)		
2013	Corinthians (beach soccer)		

International career
2003–2015	Brazil		(214)

Managerial career
- 2015: Seychelles
- * Club domestic league appearances and goals

Bruno Malias Mendes (born 29 March 1980), commonly known as Bruno Malias or simply Bruno, is a Brazilian former beach soccer player who played as a forward. He is widely regarded as one of the most prolific scorers in the history of the sport, particularly for his contributions to the Brazil national beach soccer team, with which he won four consecutive FIFA Beach Soccer World Cup titles. He has since retired from playing and currently serves as a Vereador (city councilor) in Vitória, Espírito Santo, having been elected in 2024 for the 2025–2028 term with the PSB.

== Early life ==
Born in Rio de Janeiro, Malias moved to Vitória at age 12. He debuted for the Brazil national team in 2003 and became a mainstay in the forward line during Brazil's golden era in the 2000s.

== Club career ==
Malias played for several club sides in international beach soccer circuits, including stints in Europe and South America. In 2013, he joined Corinthians alongside teammate Bruno Xavier.

== International career ==
Malias was a key member of Brazil's national team during their unprecedented run of four straight FIFA Beach Soccer World Cup victories from 2006 to 2009. He earned individual accolades, including the Bronze Ball (third-best player) and Bronze Shoe (third-top scorer) at the 2006 tournament, and the Bronze Shoe again in 2007.

He is noted as having participated in every edition of the FIFA Beach Soccer World Cup up to at least the early 2010s, and he scored the competition's 1,600th goal in one edition. As of 2025 FIFA records, he ranks among the all-time top goalscorers in World Cup history with 39 goals in 37 appearances.

For the Brazil national team overall, as of the latest available records, Malias had scored 214 goals, ranking him seventh on the all-time list for the Seleção. He retired from international play in the mid-2010s, with no further caps or goals recorded in subsequent tournaments.

== Managerial career ==
Post-retirement, Malias served as head coach of the Seychelles national beach soccer team in 2015 where the team placed 5th at the inaugural COSAFA tournament in April 2015 and prepared them for the 2015 CAF Beach Soccer Championship. He also collaborated on beach soccer infrastructure projects in Vitória (2018),

== Politics ==
Malias entered politics, being elected as a vereador (councilor) in Vitória in 2024 for the 2025–2028 term.

== Honours ==
=== International ===
Brazil

- FIFA Beach Soccer World Cup: Winner: 2006, 2007, 2008, 2009
- FIFA Beach Soccer World Cup qualification (CONMEBOL): Winner: 2005, 2006, 2008, 2009, 2011
- Mundialito: Winner: 2003, 2005, 2006, 2007, 2011
- Copa Latina: Winner: 2005, 2006, 2009

=== Individual ===
- FIFA Beach Soccer World Cup Top Scorer Bronze Ball (third place): 2006
- FIFA Beach Soccer World Cup Top Scorer Bronze Shoe: 2006, 2007
