= 2015 FIFA Beach Soccer World Cup final =

2015 FIFA Beach Soccer World Cup Final
- Event: 2015 FIFA Beach Soccer World Cup
Tahiti	Portugal
(French Polynesia)	(Portugal)
3	5
- Date: 19 July 2015
- Venue: Praia da Baía, Espinho
- Referee: Rubén Eiriz (Spain)
- Attendance: 3,500
- Weather: Sunny; 23 °C (73 °F); 78% humidity

The 2015 FIFA Beach Soccer World Cup Final was the last match of the 2015 FIFA Beach Soccer World Cup which took place on July 19, 2015 at the Praia da Baía, in Espinho. The final was contested between Tahiti, who had never competed in the FIFA final before, and Portugal, who were back to a final ten years after reaching the final of the inaugural Beach Soccer World Cup. Team Portugal won the FIFA Beach Soccer World Cup for the first time.

== Road to the final ==
(French Polynesia) Tahiti		Round	Portugal	
Opponent	Result	Group stage	Opponent	Result
Madagascar	4–3	Match 1	Japan	4–2
Paraguay	7–5	Match 2	Senegal	5–6
Russia	7–6	Match 3	Argentina	7–2
Group D winner: Pos / Team / Pld / W / W+ / WPK / L / GF / GA / GD / Pts / Qualification; 1 / Tahiti / 3 / 3 / 0 / 0 / 0 / 18 / 14 / +4 / 9 / Knockout stage; 2 / Russia / 3 / 2 / 0 / 0 / 1 / 17 / 14 / +3 / 6 / Knockout stage; 3 / Paraguay / 3 / 1 / 0 / 0 / 2 / 14 / 16 / −2 / 3; 4 / Madagascar / 3 / 0 / 0 / 0 / 3 / 7 / 12 / −5 / 0; Source: FIFA		Final standings	Group A winner: Pos / Team / Pld / W / W+ / WPK / L / GF / GA / GD / Pts / Qualification; 1 / Portugal (H) / 3 / 2 / 0 / 0 / 1 / 16 / 10 / +6 / 6 (Note: Portugal ahead of Japan on points obtained on head-to-head matches (Portugal defeated Japan 4–2)) / Knockout stage; 2 / Japan / 3 / 2 / 0 / 0 / 1 / 10 / 10 / 0 / 6 / Knockout stage; 3 / Argentina / 3 / 1 / 0 / 0 / 2 / 9 / 14 / −5 / 3 (Note: Argentina ahead of Senegal on points obtained on head-to-head matches (Argentina defeated Senegal 4–3)); 4 / Senegal / 3 / 1 / 0 / 0 / 2 / 12 / 13 / −1 / 3; Source: FIFA (H) Host; Notes:	
Opponent	Result	Knockout stage	Opponent	Result
Iran	5–4	Quarterfinals	Switzerland	7–3
Italy	6–6 (a.e.t.); 3–1 (p)	Semifinals	Russia	4–2

== Match details ==
19 July 2015
18:30

Tahiti	3–5	Portugal
Labaste 17'; Li Fung Kuee 19', 25'	Report	Madjer 1'; Belchior 7'; Coimbra 17'; Novo 21'; Alan 36'

Praia da Baía, Espinho
Attendance: 3,500
Referee: Rubén Eiriz (Spain)

Tahiti	Portugal

GK	1	Jonathan Torohia
DF	4	Heimanu Taiarui	(yellow card) 20'
W	6	Patrick Tepa
W	7	Raimana Li Fung Kuee (c)
W	8	Heiarii Tavanae
Substitutes:
GK	12	Franck Revel
DF	2	Angelo Tchen
DF	3	Tainui Lehartel
W	5	Raimoana Bennett
P	10	Tearii Labaste
W	11	Teva Zaveroni
P	9	Naea Bennett
Manager:
(French Polynesia) Tehina Rota

GK	12	Elinton Andrade
W	5	Jordan
W	7	Madjer (c)
DF	9	Bruno Novo	(yellow card) 25'
W	10	Belchior
Substitutes:
GK	1	Tiago Petrony
DF	2	Coimbra	(yellow card) 34'
W	3	Léo Martins
W	6	Alan
W	8	Zé Maria
W	11	Bê Martins
DF	4	Bruno Torres
Manager:
(Portugal) Mário Narciso

Assistant referees:
Gionni Matticoli (Italy)
Hugo Pado (Solomon Islands)
Timekeeper:
Roman Borisov (Russia)

Match rules:

- 36 minutes; 3 periods of 12 minutes
- 3 minutes of extra time if scores level
- Sudden death penalty shoot-out if scores still level
- 7 substitutes named, of which all may be used
