= 2011 FIFA Beach Soccer World Cup =

Campionato mondiale di beach soccer 2011

Tournament details
- Host country: Italy
- City: Ravenna
- Dates: 1–11 September
- Teams: 16 (from 6 confederations)
- Venue: 1 (in 1 host city)

Final positions
- Champions: Russia (1st title)
- Runners-up: Brazil
- Third place: Portugal
- Fourth place: El Salvador

Tournament statistics
- Matches played: 32
- Goals scored: 269 (8.41 per match)
- Attendance: 119,370 (3,730 per match)
- Top scorer(s): (Brazil) André (14 goals)
- Best player: (Russia) Ilya Leonov
- Best goalkeeper: (Russia) Andrey Bukhlitskiy
- Fair play award: Nigeria

The 2011 FIFA Beach Soccer World Cup was the sixth edition of the FIFA Beach Soccer World Cup, governed by FIFA. Overall, this was the 16th edition of a world cup in beach soccer since the establishment of the Beach Soccer World Championships which ran from 1995–2004 but was not governed by FIFA. It took place at the Stadio del Mare (Stadium of the Sea), a temporary stadium at the Marina di Ravenna in Ravenna, Italy, the third tournament to take place outside Brazil, which started on 1 September and ended on 11 September 2011. However this was the first tournament to take place under the new two year basis; now the FIFA Beach Soccer World Cup takes place once every two years. The tournament was confirmed in March 2010.

Brazil were the defending champions, after winning their fourth FIFA Beach Soccer World Cup title in 2009. The tournament was won by Russia, winning their first title in their first final after beating Brazil.

== Qualifying rounds ==
=== African Zone ===
The African qualifiers took place between June 15 and June 19, 2011, in Casablanca, Morocco, for the first time. The competition took place between nine teams, the same number of teams who competed in the previous championship. Not surprisingly, Senegal and Nigeria were the eventual qualifying nations, after beating Egypt and surprise semi-finalists Madagascar respectively to reach the final. Senegal were the winners of the competition, beating Nigeria 7-4 in the final.

=== Asian Zone ===
The Asian qualifiers took place in Muscat, Oman, for the first time, between February 27 and March 4, 2011. Beach Soccer Worldwide and FIFA decided on holding the tournament there, due to the success of the 2010 Asian Beach Games, also held there. A record eleven teams participated, an increase on the previous record of seven teams in 2009. Japan clinched their second successive championship title, after beating hosts Oman in the final who will play at the World Cup for the first time. Iran won the third-place play off against the United Arab Emirates to qualify for their fourth World Cup appearance, whilst the United Arab Emirates have failed to qualify to the World Cup, after hosting the competition in 2009.

=== European Zone ===
The European qualifiers took place in Bibione, Italy from 11–18 July 2010, with 27 teams participating for four European berths. The surprising winners of the qualifiers, Ukraine, qualified along with runners-up Portugal, third-place Russia and fourth-place Switzerland. Only the semi-finalists qualified to the World Cup, meaning that Spain, who won the qualifiers in 2008, have failed to make the finals in Ravenna, meaning that this World Cup will be the first time Spain have not competed in twelve World Cups, since 1997. 2005 World Cup winners France have also failed to qualify, making it two World Cups in a row France have failed to qualify for.

=== North, Central American and Caribbean Zone ===
The CONCACAF qualifiers were played between 8 nations, an increase from last year's 6, for the first time, between 1–5 December 2010, in Puerto Vallarta, Mexico, for the third year in a row, seeing Jamaica return after four years and newcomers Guatemala joining the tournament. However, inevitably, the qualifiers were fought out between the strongest four nations in CONCACAF: El Salvador, Costa Rica, Mexico and the United States, who met in the semi-finals of the tournament, clearly dominating as a 'big four' force. However, only the finalists could qualify for the World Cup, which led to two dramatic semi-final games which saw both matches go to penalty shootouts. In the end, it was El Salvador and Mexico who qualified, after tense 3-3 and 1-1 draws against Costa Rica and the United States respectively. The qualifying nations eventually went through on penalties, 2-1 and 1-0 respectively, meaning that El Salvador qualify for the World Cup consecutively after putting out Costa Rica, who qualified last year, whilst Mexico qualify after a two-year absence from the World Cup, meaning the United States have now failed to qualify since 2007. Mexico were favourites from CONCACAF in Ravenna after beating El Salvador in the final of the qualifiers. The United States finished third after beating Costa Rica in the third place play off.

=== Oceanian Zone ===
The OFC qualifiers took place from 23–26 February 2011 in Papeete, Tahiti, the place where the 2013 FIFA Beach Soccer World Cup will be held. This was the third time the island hosted the qualifiers following 2006 and 2009, but the first in Papeete, as it had been held in Moorea previously. Once again, Fiji, the Solomon Islands, and Tahiti competed however Vanuatu were forced to withdraw due to being stranded at their airport because of a cyclone that had passed through the area. Despite the Solomon Islands looking the dominant team, winning both their games in the group stage, they lost to hosts Tahiti in the final, meaning for the first time since the qualifiers began in 2006, the Solomon Islands will not be competing in the World Cup.

=== South American Zone ===
The CONMEBOL qualifiers were originally scheduled to take place from 7–14 May 2011, in Rio de Janeiro, Brazil. However the tournament was rescheduled and took place from 31 July to 7 August. For the fourth consecutive tournament, Brazil won the championship, after beating Argentina in the final, 6-2. Since both these nations reached the final, this also means that they both qualify for the fourth year in a row. The surprise of the tournament saw Uruguay crash out at the group stage of the tournament, meaning for the first time since the World Cup's inception in 1995, Uruguay will not be competing, leaving Brazil as the sole nation to have competed in every World Cup to date. With Uruguay's absence from the knockout stage, this allowed Venezuela to claim victory over surprise semi-finalists Colombia, to qualify for their third World Cup, after their last appearance in 2001.

=== Hosts ===
Italy qualified automatically as the hosts, although they still competed in the European qualifiers, being knocked out in the round of 16.

== Teams ==
These are the teams that have qualified for the 2011 FIFA Beach Soccer World Cup:

Asian zone (AFC):

- Iran
- Japan
- Oman (first appearance)

African zone (CAF):

- Nigeria
- Senegal

European zone (UEFA):

- Italy (hosts)
- Portugal
- Russia
- Switzerland
- Ukraine

North, Central American and Caribbean zone (CONCACAF):

- El Salvador
- Mexico

Oceanian zone (OFC):

- Tahiti (first appearance)

South American zone (CONMEBOL):

- Argentina
- Brazil
- Venezuela

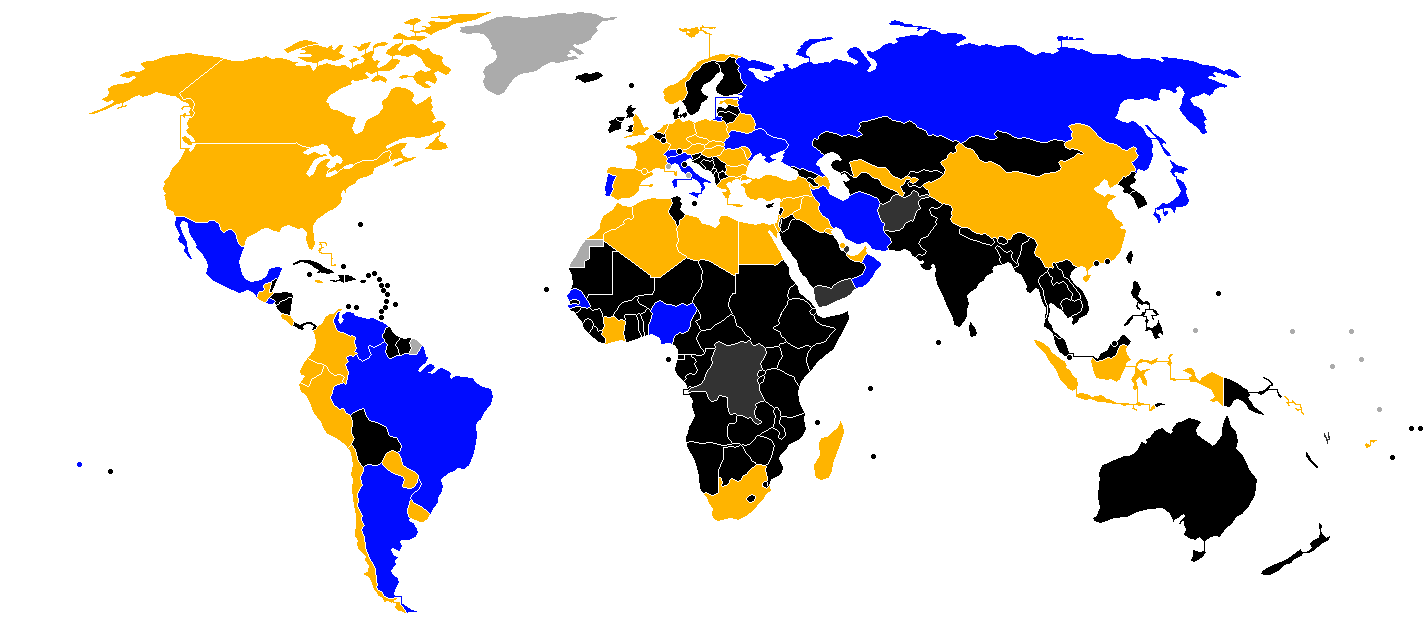
Qualified for World Cup finals Entered qualifying rounds but failed to qualify for World Cup finals Entered qualifying rounds, but withdrew before they began Did not enter World Cup Not an associate member of FIFA

== Venue ==
Only one venue was used in the city of Ravenna during the World Cup which has been called the Stadio del Mare or the Stadium of the Sea, in English. The Stadium was built as a temporary structure, primarily built to host the World Cup however the stadium also hosted the third stage of the 2011 Euro Beach Soccer League, to promote beach soccer in the area before the start of the World Cup.

Ravenna	2011 FIFA Beach Soccer World Cup (Italy)
Stadio del Mare	2011 FIFA Beach Soccer World Cup (Italy)
44°25′N 12°12′E	2011 FIFA Beach Soccer World Cup (Italy)
Capacity: 5,500	2011 FIFA Beach Soccer World Cup (Italy)

== Referees ==
FIFA chose 25 officials to referee the matches. From the 25 referees, at least one referee representing each confederation; four from the AFC, three from CAF, five from CONMEBOL, three from CONCACAF, one from the OFC and eight from UEFA, with all 25 officials being from different countries. The referees were revealed in August 2011.

AFC	CAF	CONCACAF	CONMEBOL	OFC	UEFA	
(Malaysia) Suhaimi Mat Hassan (Japan) Tasuku Onodera (Thailand) Suwat Wongsuwan (United Arab Emirates) Ebrahim Almansory	(Madagascar) Said Hachim (Mauritius) David Adolphe (Nigeria) Jelili Ogunmuyiwa	(El Salvador) Oscar Velasquez (Guatemala) Miguel Lopez (Panama) Oscar Arosemena	(Argentina) Juan Rodriguez (Brazil) Ivo De Moraes (Chile) Rene De La Rosa (Ecuador) Jose Cortez (Uruguay) Javier Bentancor	(Solomon Islands) Hugo Pado	(Hungary) Istvan Meszaros (Italy) Roberto Pungitore (Netherlands) Michael Medina (Poland) Tomasz Winiarczyk	(Russia) Alexander Berezkin (Spain) Ruben Eiriz (Switzerland) Christian Zimmermann (Turkey) Serdar Akcer

== Final draw ==
The draw to divide the 16 teams in four groups of four was conducted on 5 July 2011 in Rome, Italy, which was conducted by FIFA Beach Soccer Committee members Joan Cuscó and Jaime Yarza. 1998 FIFA World Cup winner Christian Karembeu and beach soccer legend, Ramiro Figueiras Amarelle assisted the draw.

Pot 1 (Hosts & Europe Top 3)	Pot 2 (Asia & Oceania)	Pot 3 (Africa & North America)	Pot 4 (South America & 4th European nation)
Italy; Ukraine; Portugal; Russia	Japan; Oman; Iran; Tahiti	Senegal; Nigeria; Mexico; El Salvador	Brazil; Argentina; Venezuela; Switzerland

The sixteen teams were placed into four pots of four teams. One team from each pot was placed into each respective group A, B, C and D, with the hosts being chosen first to play in group A.

== Squads ==
As with previous tournaments, each nations' squad consists of a total of 12 players; only these players were eligible to play in the World Cup. On 25 August 2011, the squad lists for the 16 teams were announced, consisting of a total of 192 players who will be participating in the World Cup. Brazil have the oldest squad, with an average age of 31, whilst Nigeria have the youngest squad with an average age of 22.

== Group stage ==
The group stage commenced on September 1 and concluded on September 6, with Argentina against Oman being the opening match of the competition.

All kickoff times are listed as local time in Ravenna (UTC+2).

Legend
Teams that advanced to the quarter finals

=== Group A ===
Team	Pld	W	WE	L	GF	GA	+/-	Pts
Italy	3	1	2	0	13	12	+1	7
Senegal	3	1	1	1	17	15	+2	5
Switzerland	3	1	0	2	16	15	+1	3
Iran	3	0	0	3	13	17	−4	0

1 September 2011
17:00

Switzerland	8–8 (a.e.t.)	Senegal
D. Stankovic 7', 20', 22'; M. Jaeggy 18', 33'; N. Sylla 25' (o.g.), 28' (o.g.); S. Leu 33'	Report	3', 4', 22' P. Koukpaki; 6' N. Mbaye; 11', 24' N. Sylla; 14' L. Diagne; 20' I. Bakhoum
Penalties
D. Stankovic (penalty missed)	0–1	(penalty scored) P. Koukpaki

Stadio del Mare, Marina di Ravenna
Attendance: 4,500
Referee: (Argentina) Juan Rodriguez

1 September 2011
18:30

Italy	6–6 (a.e.t.)	Iran
G. Soria 8' (pen.), 29'; M. Marrucci 20'; G. Gori 20'; F. Corosiniti 27'; F. Palma 29'	Report	6' (pen.) M. Hassani; 13' A. Naderi; 16', 28' H. Abdollahi; 22', 36' F. Boulokbashi
Penalties
S. Feudi (penalty scored); G. Soria (penalty scored); F. Palma (penalty scored); G. Gori (penalty scored); P. Palmacci (penalty scored)	5–4	(penalty scored) M. Mohktari; (penalty scored) A. Naderi; (penalty scored) F. Boulokbashi; (penalty scored) M. Ahmadzadeh; (penalty missed) M. Mesigar

Stadio del Mare, Marina di Ravenna
Attendance: 5,000
Referee: (Uruguay) Javier Bentancor

3 September 2011
15:30

Iran	4–6	Switzerland
M. Mokhtari 9', 21'; M. Ahmadzadeh 29'; H. Abdollahi 36'	Report	4' V. Jaeggy; 9' S. Spaccarotella; 9' M. Jaeggy; 10' M. Rodrigues; 11' A. Schirinzi; 36' S. Leu

Stadio del Mare, Marina di Ravenna
Attendance: 3,650
Referee: (Spain) Ruben Eiriz

3 September 2011
18:30

Senegal	4–4 (a.e.t.)	Italy
N. Mbaye 27', 34'; P. Koukpaki 36', 36'	Report	1' S. Feudi; 8', 36', 36' P. Palmacci
Penalties
P. Koukpaki (penalty scored); B. Fall (penalty scored); N. Mbaye (penalty missed)	2–3	(penalty scored) S. Feudi; (penalty scored) G. Soria; (penalty scored) F. Palma

Stadio del Mare, Marina di Ravenna
Attendance: 5,500
Referee: (Nigeria) Jelili Ogunmuyiwa

5 September 2011
15:30

Iran	3–5	Senegal
M. Hassani 16'; M. Mesigar 19'; F. Boulokbashi 31'	Report	1', 4' N. Mbaye; 9', 36' B. Fall; 24' C. Ba

Stadio del Mare, Marina di Ravenna
Attendance: 3,500
Referee: (Guatemala) Miguel Lopez

5 September 2011
18:30

Italy	3–2	Switzerland
G. Soria 24'; F. Corosiniti 27', 36'	Report	9' S. Leu; 36' D. Stankovic

Stadio del Mare, Marina di Ravenna
Attendance: 5,500
Referee: (Hungary) Istvan Meszaros

=== Group B ===
Team	Pld	W	WE	L	GF	GA	+/-	Pts
Portugal	3	3	0	0	24	5	+19	9
El Salvador	3	2	0	1	10	17	−7	6
Argentina	3	1	0	2	6	10	−4	3
Oman	3	0	0	3	7	15	−8	0

1 September 2011
15:30

Argentina	3–1	Oman
J. Vivas 17'; G. Spinelli 21'; S. Larreta 27'	Report	Al-Sinani 1'

Stadio del Mare, Marina di Ravenna
Attendance: 3,000
Referee: (Spain) Ruben Eiriz

1 September 2011
20:00

El Salvador	2–11	Portugal
A. Ruiz 17'; F. Velásquez 28'	Report	1', 2', 5' Madjer; 1', 32' N. Belchior; 15', 27' R. Coimbra; 17', 17' Alan; 22' Lucio; 24' B. Novo

Stadio del Mare, Marina di Ravenna
Attendance: 2,000
Referee: (Japan) Tasuku Onodera

3 September 2011
17:00

Portugal	5–0	Argentina
Madjer 4', 17', 24', 34'; N. Belchior 23'	Report

Stadio del Mare, Marina di Ravenna
Attendance: 4,500
Referee: (Russia) Alexander Berezkin

3 September 2011
20:00

Oman	3–4	El Salvador
Al-Sinani 12', 34'; Al-Dhabit 34'	Report	16' E. Ramírez; 25' T. Hernández; 26' J. Gallo; 36' A. Ruiz

Stadio del Mare, Marina di Ravenna
Attendance: 1,500
Referee: (Madagascar) Said Hachim

5 September 2011
17:00

Portugal	8–3	Oman
Madjer 3', 33'; P. Graça 9'; Lucio 12', 34'; Y. Al Araimi 18' (o.g.); Duarte 22' (pen.); N. Belchior 27'	Report	Al-Qassmi 24'; Al-Mukhaini 28'; Al-Rajhi 31'

Stadio del Mare, Marina di Ravenna
Attendance: 4,130
Referee: (Ecuador) Jose Cortez

5 September 2011
20:00

El Salvador	4–3	Argentina
F. Velásquez 19'; A. Ruiz 24'; J. Membreño 32'; W. Torres 36'	Report	19' L. Franceschini; 19', 36' J. Levi

Stadio del Mare, Marina di Ravenna
Attendance: 1,330
Referee: (Nigeria) Jelili Ogunmuyiwa

=== Group C ===
Team	Pld	W	WE	L	GF	GA	+/-	Pts
Russia	3	3	0	0	20	7	+13	9
Nigeria	3	2	0	1	13	12	+1	6
Tahiti	3	1	0	2	6	11	−5	3
Venezuela	3	0	0	3	8	17	−9	0

2 September 2011
15:30

Nigeria	4–8	Russia
I. Olawale 5'; V. Tale 24'; M. Najare 24'; O. Okemmiri 25'	Report	3', 19' E. Eremeev; 5' Y. Gorchinskiy; 7', 12' E. Shaykov; 23' A. Makarov; 24' I. Leonov; 36' A. Shkarin

Stadio del Mare, Marina di Ravenna
Attendance: 1,000
Referee: (Ecuador) Jose Cortez

2 September 2011
20:00

Tahiti	5–2	Venezuela
T. Zaveroni 7', 20'; N. Bennett 16'; M. Amau 18'; T. Labaste 33'	Report	7' E. Quintero; 22' C. Longa

Stadio del Mare, Marina di Ravenna
Attendance: 1,500
Referee: (Hungary) Istvan Meszaros

4 September 2011
17:00

Venezuela	3–5	Nigeria
E. Quintero 5'; N. Nwosu 19' (o.g.); K. Camargo 27'	Report	9', 11' I. Olawale; 24', 27' V. Tale; 36' N. Nwosu

Stadio del Mare, Marina di Ravenna
Attendance: 3,750
Referee: (Panama) Oscar Arosemena

4 September 2011
20:00

Russia	5–0	Tahiti
E. Shaykov 17'; E. Eremeev 28'; Y. Krasheninnikov 28'; I. Leonov 30'; A. Makarov 34'	Report

Stadio del Mare, Marina di Ravenna
Attendance: 1,000
Referee: (Thailand) Suwat Wongsuwan

6 September 2011
17:00

Venezuela	3–7	Russia
M. Monsalve 11'; F. Landaeta 22'; G. Cardone 36'	Report	16', 21', 22' D. Shishin; 17' A. Shkarin; 28' I. Leonov; 31', 35' Y. Krasheninnikov

Stadio del Mare, Marina di Ravenna
Attendance: 2,150
Referee: (United Arab Emirates) Ebrahim Almansory

6 September 2011
20:00

Tahiti	1–4	Nigeria
T. Zaveroni 16'	Report	14', 20' V. Tale; 20' (pen.) M. Najare; 31' O. Okemmiri

Stadio del Mare, Marina di Ravenna
Attendance: 1,740
Referee: (Brazil) Ivo De Moraes

=== Group D ===
Team	Pld	W	WE	L	GF	GA	+/-	Pts
Brazil	3	2	1	0	11	7	+4	8
Mexico	3	1	1	1	6	8	−2	5
Ukraine	3	1	0	2	8	6	+2	3
Japan	3	0	0	3	6	10	−4	0

2 September 2011
17:00

Japan	2–3	Mexico
S. Yamauchi 12'; S. Suzuki 31'	Report	22' (pen.) A. Rodriguez; 24' J. Cervantes; 30' R. Villalobos

Stadio del Mare, Marina di Ravenna
Attendance: 3,000
Referee: (Poland) Tomasz Winiarczyk

2 September 2011
18:30

Brazil	3–3 (a.e.t.)	Ukraine
Benjamin 5'; Sidney 16', 27'	Report	16' I. Borsuk; 17' O. Zborovskyi; 24' O. Korniychuk
Penalties
André (penalty scored); Bruno (penalty scored)	2–1	(penalty scored) I. Borsuk; (penalty missed) O. Korniychuk

Stadio del Mare, Marina di Ravenna
Attendance: 5,000
Referee: (Panama) Oscar Arosemena

4 September 2011
15:30

Ukraine	4–2	Japan
R. Pachev 1'; S. Bozhenko 19'; O. Zborovskyi 20'; O. Mozgovyy 33'	Report	21' H. Oda; 30' M. Komaki

Stadio del Mare, Marina di Ravenna
Attendance: 2,870
Referee: (United Arab Emirates) Ebrahim Almansory

4 September 2011
18:30

Mexico	2–5	Brazil
M. Plata 3', 24' (pen.)	Report	5' Benjamin; 10' Betinho; 17' (pen.) André; 21' Buru; 24' Jorginho

Stadio del Mare, Marina di Ravenna
Attendance: 5,230
Referee: (Russia) Alexander Berezkin

6 September 2011
15:30

Ukraine	1–1 (a.e.t.)	Mexico
A. Butko 6'	Report	33' F. Cati
Penalties
I. Borsuk (penalty missed); A. Yevdokymov (penalty missed)	0–1	(penalty missed) R. Villalobos; (penalty scored) A. Rodriguez

Stadio del Mare, Marina di Ravenna
Attendance: 2,000
Referee: (Poland) Tomasz Winiarczyk

6 September 2011
18:30

Brazil	3–2	Japan
André 12', 27'; Benjamin 25'	Report	5' S. Yamauchi; 19' (pen.) M. Komaki

Stadio del Mare, Marina di Ravenna
Attendance: 4,500
Referee: (Spain) Ruben Eiriz

== Knockout stage ==
Quarter-finals
8 September 2011
Italy	5
El Salvador (a.e.t.)	6
8 September 2011
Russia	5
Mexico	3
8 September 2011
Brazil (a.e.t.)	10
Nigeria	8
8 September 2011
Portugal (pen.)	4 (3)
Senegal	4 (2)

Semi-finals
10 September 2011
El Salvador	3
Russia	7
10 September 2011
Brazil	4
Portugal	1

Final
11 September 2011
Russia	12
Brazil	8
Third place
11 September 2011
El Salvador	2
Portugal	3

=== Quarter finals ===
8 September 2011
15:30

Russia	5–3	Mexico
I. Leonov 2'; E. Shaykov 14'; Y. Krasheninnikov 16'; Y. Gorchinskiy 23'; E. Eremeev 27'	Report	10' A. Barbosa; 30' R. Villalobos; 32' M. Plata

Stadio del Mare, Marina di Ravenna
Attendance: 4,500
Referee: (Hungary) Istvan Meszaros

8 September 2011
17:00

Portugal	4–4 (a.e.t.)	Senegal
Madjer 5'; N. Belchior 5'; B. Torres 10'; J. Santos 23'	Report	5' P. Koukpaki; 13' (pen.), 13' N. Sylla; 36' (pen.) L. Diagne
Penalties
B. Torres (penalty scored); N. Belchior (penalty scored); Madjer (penalty scored)	3–2	(penalty scored) P. Koukpaki; (penalty scored) B. Fall; (penalty missed) C. Ba

Stadio del Mare, Marina di Ravenna
Attendance: 5,500
Referee: (Japan) Tasuku Onodera

8 September 2011
18:30

Italy	5–6 (a.e.t.)	El Salvador
P. Palmacci 4', 18', 31' (pen.), 34'; F. Palma 15'	Report	12', 18', 33', 38' F. Velasquez; 22' A. Ruiz; 24' T. Hernandez

Stadio del Mare, Marina di Ravenna
Attendance: 5,500
Referee: (Ecuador) Jose Cortez

8 September 2011
20:00

Brazil	10–8 (a.e.t.)	Nigeria
André 10', 11', 12', 30', 37'; Anderson 16'; Buru 24'; Jorginho 33'; Benjamin 34'; Bruno 37'	Report	10' M. Najare; 13', 16', 18', 36' B. Ibenegbu; 15', 35' J. Okwuosa; 36' V. Tale

Stadio del Mare, Marina di Ravenna
Attendance: 4,320
Referee: (Russia) Alexander Berezkin

=== Semi finals ===
10 September 2011
17:00

El Salvador	3–7	Russia
A. Ruiz 7'; F. Velásquez 17', 20'	Report	5' D. Shishin; 5' I. Leonov; 9', 19' E. Shaykov; 10' A. Makarov; 22' E. Eremeev; 35' Y. Gorchinskiy

Stadio del Mare, Marina di Ravenna
Attendance: 5,200
Referee: (Nigeria) Jelili Ogunmuyiwa

10 September 2011
18:30

Brazil	4–1	Portugal
Betinho 14'; Sidney 16', 29'; Bruno 33'	Report	5' Alan

Stadio del Mare, Marina di Ravenna
Attendance: 5,500
Referee: (Spain) Ruben Eiriz

=== Third place play off ===
11 September 2011
17:00

El Salvador	2–3	Portugal
W. Alvarado 2'; F. Velasquez 19'	Report	6', 25' Madjer; 15' (pen.) N. Belchior

Stadio del Mare, Marina di Ravenna
Attendance: 5,500
Referee: (Madagascar) Said Hachim

=== Final ===
11 September 2011
18:30

Russia	12–8	Brazil
E. Shaykov 2', 6'; I. Leonov 8', 25'; E. Eremeev 13', 19'; A. Makarov 15', 20'; Betinho 21' (o.g.); D. Shishin 21', 31', 32'	Report	8' (pen.), 11', 30', 33', 34', 35' André; 17' Betinho; 22' Sidney

Stadio del Mare, Marina di Ravenna
Attendance: 5,500
Referee: (Ecuador) Jose Cortez

== Winners ==
2011 FIFA Beach Soccer World Cup
champions

Russia
First title

== Awards ==
adidas Golden Ball	adidas Silver Ball	adidas Bronze Ball
(Russia) Ilya Leonov	(Brazil) André	(El Salvador) Frank Velasquez
adidas Golden Scorer	adidas Silver Scorer	adidas Bronze Scorer
(Brazil) André	(Portugal) Madjer	(El Salvador) Frank Velasquez
14 goals	12 goals	9 goals
adidas Golden Glove
(Russia) Andrey Bukhlitskiy
FIFA Fair Play Award
Nigeria

== Top scorers ==
14 goals

- (Brazil) André

12 goals

- (Portugal) Madjer

9 goals

- (El Salvador) Frank Velasquez

8 goals

- (Russia) Egor Shaykov

7 goals

- (Italy) Paolo Palmacci
- (Russia) Egor Eremeev
- (Russia) Ilya Leonov
- (Russia) Dmitry Shishin

6 goals

- (Nigeria) Victor Tale
- (Portugal) Nuno Belchior
- (Senegal) Pape Koukpaki

5 goals

- (Brazil) Sidney
- (Russia) Makarov
- (Senegal) Ndiaga Mbaye
- (El Salvador) Agustin Ruiz

4 goals

- (Brazil) Benjamin
- (Nigeria) Bartholomew Ibenegbu
- (Russia) Yuri Krasheninnikov
- (Senegal) Ngalla Sylla
- (Switzerland) Dejan Stankovic

== Discipline ==
Cards issued

Player with most cards

Team with most cards

Referee who has issued most cards

- Yellow (38)
- Second yellow (2)
- Red (2)
- (Iran) Hamed Ghorbanpour (3)
- (Iran) Hassan Abdollahi (2)
- (Oman) Khalid Al-Rajhi (2)
- (Portugal) Rui Coimbra (2)
- (Malaysia) Mohd Alhafes (2)
- Iran (8)
- Oman (5)
- Senegal (5)
- (Uruguay) Javier Bentancor (7)
- (Russia) Alexander Berezkin (6)
- (Ecuador) Jose Cortez (5)
- (Argentina) Juan Rodriguez (5)

== Final standings ==
Position	Team
1	Russia
2	Brazil
3	Portugal
4	El Salvador
5	Italy
6	Nigeria
7	Senegal
8	Mexico
9	Ukraine
10	Switzerland
11	Argentina
12	Tahiti
13	Iran
14	Japan
15	Oman
16	Venezuela
