= Buru (beach soccer) =

Brazilian beach soccer player

Personal information
- Full name: Venícius Ribeiro Mariane Fambre
- Date of birth: April 14, 1976 (age 50)
- Place of birth: Vitória-ES, Brazil
- Height: 1.76 m (5 ft 9 in)
- Position: Defender

Senior career*
Years	Team	Apps	(Gls)
2009–2010	AS Roma (beach soccer)		
2011	Lokomotiv Moscow (beach soccer)		
2011–2012	Corinthians (beach soccer)		

International career
1998–2016	Brazil (beach soccer)	275	(224)
- * Club domestic league appearances and goals

Venícius Ribeiro Mariane Fambre, better known as Buru, is a former Brazilian beach soccer player. He played as a defender.

== Honours ==
=== Beach soccer ===
- Brazil
  - FIFA Beach Soccer World Cup winner: 2006, 2007, 2008, 2009
  - FIFA Beach Soccer World Cup qualification (CONMEBOL) winner : 2005, 2006, 2008, 2009, 2011
  - Mundialito winner: 2004, 2005, 2006, 2007, 2010, 2011
  - Copa Latina winner: 2005, 2006, 2009

==== Individual ====
- Beach Soccer MVP: 2007
- FIFA Beach Soccer World Cup Top Scorer Golden Ball (MVP): 2007
- FIFA Beach Soccer World Cup Top Scorer Golden Shoe (Top Scorer): 2007
- FIFA Beach Soccer World Cup Top Scorer Bronze Shoe (Top Scorer): 2009
- Mundialito MVP: 2006
