= Napoli Beach Soccer =

Italian beach soccer team

- Full name: ASD Napoli Beach Soccer
- Nickname: Azzurri
- Founded: 2009
- Ground: Games Village Mugnano
- Chairman: Raffaele Moxedano
- Coach: (Italy) Franco Palma
- League: Serie A LND
Home colours	Away colours

The ASD Napoli Beach Soccer is a professional beach soccer team based in Naples, Italy.

== History ==
=== The 2009 Scudetto and Refoundation ===
Founded in 2009, Napoli Beach Soccer won the Serie A with an incredible run that saw the Partenopei win its group-stage and defeat both Lignano Sabbiadoro (6-3) and Terranova Terracina (4-3) in the final eight before win a 6–5 final against Milano Beach Soccer with one goal each for Diego Maradona Sinagra and Hilaire and the winning goal of Alessandro Tiberi, the Serie A topscorer and best player with 22 goals and the saves of Salguero, the argentinian player voted the best goalkeeper of the league. In the following season, Napoli lost 2-5 the 2010 Supercoppa Italiana final against Milano Beach Soccer that five days later will be crown the new Italian champions. After a 6th place in 2010, Napoli team was inactive for 4 years until it won the 2015 Serie B with Amici Dello Sport and almost qualified for a Playoff spot in the 2016 Serie A. In 2023, the Azzurri won the regular season but they lost both the semifinal (against Catania and the 3rd place Payoff against Pisa).

=== The 2023 World Winners Cup ===
The 26th September Napoli Beach Soccer started its journey in the 2023 BSWW World Winners Cup with a 16–2 win against Vion BS, the in following two days the Campania club defeated 7-4 the Kebbi BS and 2-1 the Copenhagen BSC. In the knock-out stage, Napoli overcame 15-1 Marseille BT (Round 16), 5-3 Barra de Santiago (Quarterfinal) and 4-2 Pafos BSC (Semifinal). The 1st October 2023, Napoli Beach Soccer won the third BSWW World Winners Cup final with a 6–3 win in Alghero against Riga FC (goals: Emmanuele Zurlo and Lucao (Lucas Azevedo) in the first period; Fabio Sciacca, Paolo Palmacci and Salvatore Sanfilippo in the second one and a Lucao goal in the third and last period), while Pafos FC won the bronze medal with a 6–3 win against Bahia de Mazarron. Sebastiano Paterniti was selected as Best Goalkeeper while Lucao was voted the Best Player of WWC 2023.

=== Euro Winners Cup and 2025 Coppa Italia ===
One year later the Azzzurri debuted in the Euro Winners Cup where it topped its group (11–2 against Havana Shots Aargau, 7–4 against Erciş Spor and beat the Greek club Napoli Patron 7-6) and won 6–2 against West Deva (Round 16) before be defeated 3–6 by Huelva in the quarterfinal. Few month later, Napoli Beach Soccer won the 2025 Coppa Italia with a 6–3 win in San Benedetto del Tronto against Viareggio Beach Soccer after it defeated 5-2 Genoa, 6-1 Milano Beach Soccer and 6-5 Catania Beach Soccer (title holder) with two goals of Bê Martins (voted 2022 and 2024 World Best Player at Beach Soccer Stars ceremony), one of Leo Martins, a bicycle kick of Fabio Sciacca and a last minute goal of Raffaele Moxedano, the chairman of the club. In the same year it lost the final of the fifth World Winners Cup 1–3 against Kfar Qassem BS Club. In July 2026 Napoli won its first Supercoppa Italiana defeating Pisa BS 6-5 pso after a 2-2 tie in Castelsardo, ten days after they lost 1-3 the 2026 Coppa Italia final to Sambenedettese.

== Players & Managers ==
Notable Players

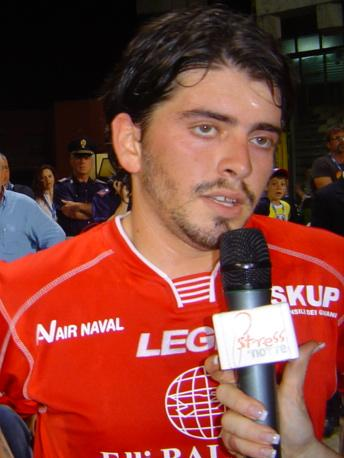
Maradona Jr

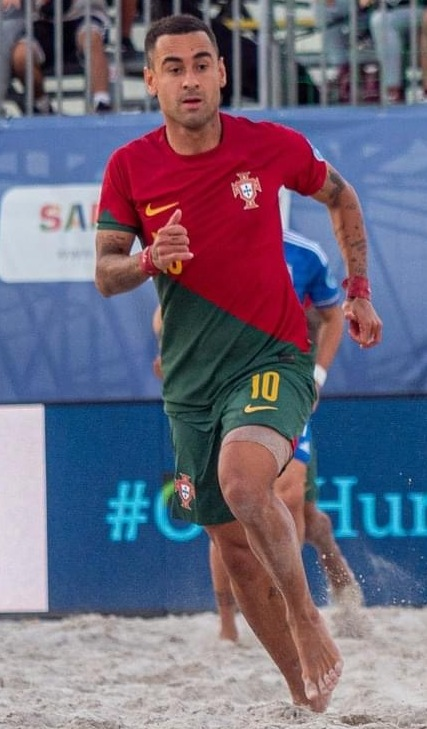
Be Martins

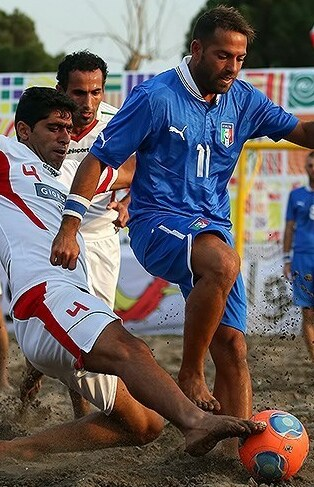
Paolo Palmacci

- Diego Maradona Sinagra (2009-2011, 2018-2019) scored once in the 2009 Scudetto final, once in the 2010 Supercup final and once in 2008 FIFA Beach Soccer World Cup final
- Alessandro Tiberi was the Topscorer and Best Player of 2009 Serie A with 4 goals in the final, including the winning one
- Salguero was the Best Goalkeeper in the 2009 Serie A Championship
- Lucao was the Best Player of 2023 World Winners Cup
- Fabio Sciacca (2022-2025) scored once in the 2023 World Winners Cup final, once in the 2025 Coppa Italia final and won twice the Euro Beach Soccer League (2023 and 2025)
- Sebastiano Paterniti was Best Goalkeeper in the 2023 World Winners Cup
- Paolo Palmacci (2021-2025) scored once in the 2023 World Winners Cup final, scored and won the 2018 EBSL, scored in the 2008 World Cup final with a second silver medal in 2019 FIFA Beach Soccer World Cup and won the 2025 Coppa Italia
- Bê Martins scored twice in the 2025 Coppa Italia final and won in his career two FIFA Beach Soccer World Cup (2015 and 2019), four EBSL (2015, 2019, 2020 and 2021), three Euro Winners Cup and two the Best World Player (2022 and 2024)
- Leo Martins scored one in the 2025 Coppa Italia final and twice in the 2019 World Cup final

Notable Coaches

- Ciro Amorosetti was the coach of the 2009 Scudetto
- Andrea Sannino was the manager of 2023 World Winner Cup
- Franco Palma was a former player and the coach of 2025 Coppa Italia

== Honours ==
=== International competitions ===
BSWW World Winners Cup

- Champions: 2023 6–3 against Riga BS
- Finalist: 2025 (1–3 against Kfar Qassem BS)
- Third place: 2022

Euro Winners Cup

- Quarterfinalis: 2024 (7th place)

=== National competitions ===
Serie A Beach Soccer

- Champions: 2009 6–5 against Milano BS
- Third place: 2022, 2025 and 2026
- Fourth place: 2023
- Regular season winner: 2023

Coppa Italia

- Champions: 2025 6–3 against Viareggio BS
- Finalist: 2026 (1-3 against Sambenedettese BS)
- Fourth place: 2022

Supercoppa Italiana

- Champions: 2026 (8-7 against Pisa BS)
- Finalist: 2010 (2-5 against Milano BS)

Serie B Beach Soccer

- Winner: 2015

=== Rankings ===
BSWW World Ranking

- Third place: 2025-26

== See also ==
- Serie A Beach Soccer
- Coppa Italia Beach Soccer
- Supercoppa Italiana Beach Soccer
- Euro Winners Cup
- World Winners Cup
- Milano Beach Soccer
- Catania Beach Soccer
