= 2025 Italian Beach Soccer League =

Association football competition

Campionato Italiano di Beach Soccer

Tournament details
- City: Cirò Marina (Calabria)
- Dates: May 30, 2025; August 9, 2025
- Teams: 26 (20 in Serie A)

Final positions
- Champions: Pisa BS (Serie A); G. Viareggio (Serie B)
- Runners-up: Catania BS (Serie A); M. Palanca (Serie B)
- Third place: Napoli BS (Serie A)
- Fourth place: Viareggio BS (Serie A)

Tournament statistics
- Matches played: 115
- Goals scored: 1,005 (8.74 per match)
- Top scorer(s): (Brazil) Edson Hulk (24 goals, Pisa BS) (Spain) Ramy Saghdany (34 goals, Terracina BS); 24 Serie A + 10 Coppa Ita

The 2025 Italian Beach Soccer League was the 21st season of the Italian beach soccer league. Twenty-six clubs played in one of the two divisions of the championship: 20 in first category and 6 in the second one.

The 20 clubs that played in Serie A were split into two internal sud-division with the top-seven of the Scudetto Poule and the winner of Promotion Poule that qualify to the Final Eight. The six clubs that played in Serie B were divided into two groups with the winners that played the final in Cirò Marina. After the 2021 and 2022 titles, Pisa Beach Soccer won its third Scudetto in a 2–1 final game in Cirò Marina against Catania Beach Soccer in the re-match of the 2024 final.

The Brazilian player Edson Hulk was the topscorer of the Scudetto Poule with 24 goals while the Spanish player Ramy Saghdany was the overall Capocannoniere with 24 goals scored in the Promozione Poule and 10 in Coppa Italia. 940 goals were scored in the 108 Serie A matches and 65 goals were scored in Serie B over just 7 matches. Considering all ten events, 228 matches were played in 2024–25 season.

== 2025 Serie A ==
=== Calendar and locations ===
| Date | Region | City | Stage |
|---|---|---|---|
| 30 May – 2 June | Sardinia | Alghero | Poule Scudetto |
| 19–22 June | Lazio | Terracina | Poule Promozione |
| 9–13 July | Campania | Castellammare di Stabia | Poule Scudetto and Promozione |
| 17–20 July | Tuscany | Tirrenia | Poule Scudetto and Promozione |
| 4–9 August | Calabria | Cirò Marina | LND Finals |

=== Poule Scudetto ===
| Pos | Team | Points | GD | Qualification |
|---|---|---|---|---|
| 1 | Catania BS | 22 | +18 | Advance to 2025; Scudetto Playoffs |
| 2 | Pisa BS | 21 | +16 | Advance to 2025; Scudetto Playoffs |
| 3 | Napoli BS | 19 | +21 | Advance to 2025; Scudetto Playoffs |
| 4 | Viareggio BS | 19 | +16 | Advance to 2025; Scudetto Playoffs |
| 5 | Sambenedettese BS | 15 | +7 | Advance to 2025; Scudetto Playoffs |
| 6 | Catania FC | 11 | +9 | Advance to 2025; Scudetto Playoffs |
| 7 | Cagliari BS | 9 | -4 | Advance to 2025; Scudetto Playoffs |
| 8 | Milano BS | 7 | -18 | |
| 9 | Roma BS | 3 | -20 | 2025 Promotion Playoffs |
| 10 | Bologna BS | 0 | -50 | 2026 Poule Promozione |

Topscorers

| Rank | Player | Club | Goals |
|---|---|---|---|
| 1 | Edson Hulk | Pisa BS | 24 |
| 2 | Duarte | Catania FC | 21 |
| 3 | Emanuele Zurlo | Catania FC | 20 |
| 4 | Gabriele Gori | Sambenedettese | 14 |
| 5 | Léo Martins | Napoli BS | 13 |
| 5 | Bruno Xavier | Viareggio BS | 13 |

=== Poule Promozione ===
| Pos | Team | Points | GD | Qualification |
|---|---|---|---|---|
| 1 | Naxos (Sicily) | 27 | +23 | 2026 Scudetto Poule; 2025 Scudetto Playoffs |
| 2 | Lamezia BS | 21 | +21 | Promotion Playoffs |
| 3 | Terracina BS | 18 | +21 | Promotion Playoffs |
| 4 | Genova BS | 18 | +21 | Promotion Playoffs |
| 5 | Sicilia BS | 18 | +12 | |
| 6 | Vastese | 12 | -5 | |
| 7 | Brancaleone | 6 | -19 | |
| 8 | Faventina | 6 | -19 | |
| 9 | Crotone | 4 | -33 | |
| 10 | Chiavari | 3 | -22 | |

Topscorers

| Rank | Player | Club | Goals |
|---|---|---|---|
| 1 | Ramy | Terracina BS | 24 |
| 1 | Pablo Perez | Naxos | 24 |
| 3 | Pedrinho | Sicilia BS | 15 |
| 4 | Damm Alex Eugen | Genova BS | 11 |
| 5 | Suli Batis | Terracina BS | 10 |

== Scudetto Playoffs ==
=== Final Eight ===
Quarter-finals
Viareggio BS | 7
Sambenedettese BS | 3
Catania BS | 8
Naxos Sicily | 2
Napoli BS | 7
Catania FC | 2
Pisa BS | 7
Cagliari BS | 2

Semi-finals
Viareggio BS | 3
Catania BS | 5
Napoli BS | 4
Pisa BS | 5

2025 Serie A Final
Catania BS | 1
Pisa BS | 2
Third place
Viareggio BS | 4
Napoli BS | 5

Consolation tournament

5th/8th place Playoff
Sambenedettese BS | 10
Naxos Sicily | 6
Catania FC | 3
Cagliari BS | 4

5th/6th place final
Sambenedettese BS | 7
Cagliari BS | 1
7th/8th place Final
Naxos Sicily | 8
Catania FC | 14

=== Promotion Playoffs ===
| Rnk | Club | P.ts | LAM | GEN | ROM | TER |
|---|---|---|---|---|---|---|
| 1 | Lamezia BS | 9 | | 5-4 | 6-3 | 8-6 |
| 2 | Genova BS | 3 | 4-5 | | 5-1 | 3-5 |
| 3 | Roma BS | 3 | 4-5 | 1-5 | | 7-3 |
| 4 | Terracina BS | 3 | 6-8 | 5-3 | 3-7 | |

== 2025 Scudetto Final ==
=== Catania BS vs Pisa BS ===
Pisa BS won its third Scudetto after an intense final against Catania BS with the three goals of the match scored in the second third including an incredible Alison's bicycle kick for the temporary draw.

9th August 2025
20:30 CEST

| Catania BS | 1-2 | Pisa BS |
|---|---|---|
| Alison 14' | Report | Datinha 13'; Bertacca 23' |

Beach Stadium,
Cirò Marina (Calabria)
Attendance: ???
Referee: ???

| Catania Beach Soccer | Beach Soccer Pisa |

Catania Beach Soccer
Players: Shalabi, Giordani, Campagna, Fred, Josep Jr, Valenti, Barbagallo, Leone, Joao Silva, De Nisi, Alisson
Manager: Fabricio Santos

Pisa Beach Soccer
Players: Remedi, Barsotti, Bertacca, Marinai, Armadori, Casapieri, Ardil Navarro, Mogavero, Edson Hulk, Bernardeschi, Percia Montani, Datinha
Manager: Marrucci

=== 2025 Serie A Awards ===
| Award | Player | Club |
|---|---|---|
| Serie A MVP | (Italy) Josep Junior Gentilin | Catania BS |
| Final MVP | (Italy) Leandro Casapieri | Pisa BS |
| Topscorer | (Brazil) Hulk | Pisa BS |
| Best Goalkeeper | (Italy) Leandro Casapieri | Pisa BS |

== 2025 Serie B ==
=== Regular season ===
| Rnk | Group A | Points | VIA | AMA | CEN | Group B | Points | MAS | AGR | TIR |
|---|---|---|---|---|---|---|---|---|---|---|
| 1 | Gladiators Viareggio | 3 | | 4-3 | 5-6* | Massimo Palanca | 6 | | 5-2 | 9-1 |
| 2 | Amarenta | 2 | 6-5* | | 9-8* | Givova Città di Agropoli | 3 | 2-5 | | 6-1 |
| 3 | Centro Storico | 0 | 3-4 | 8-9* | | Tirrena Lazio | 0 | 1-9 | 1-6 | |

- (po)

=== 2025 Serie B Final ===
6th August 2025
11:30 CEST

| Gladiators Viareggio | 4-2 | Massimo Palanca |
|---|---|---|
| Ksioua; Nevelin; Giannini | Report | Morelli |

Beach Stadium,
Cirò Marina (Calabria)
Attendance: ???
Referee: Bottalico Bari and Pedarra Foggia

Gladiators Viareggio
Players: Mei, Alì, Giannini, Litto, Comelli, Ksioua, Vannucci, Della Casa, Limongello, Del Mancino, Nevelin, Francesconi
Manager: Valenzi

Massimo Palanca
Players: Gallo, Mauro, Raso, Canino, Lombardo, Mercuri, Mirabelli, Morelli, Procopio, Romagnuolo
Manager: Notaris

Topscorers

| Rank | Player | Club | Goals |
|---|---|---|---|
| 1 | Mercuri Antonio | Massimo Palanca | 5 |
| 1 | Morelli Francesco | Massimo Palanca | 5 |
| 3 | Nevelin Robin Junior | Gladiators Viareggio | 4 |
| 4 | Pastore Giuseppe | Gladiators Viareggio | 4 |
| 5 | Ksioua Adam Samir | Gladiators Viareggio | 3 |

== 2025 Coppa Italia ==
2025 Coppa Italia (beach soccer)
Coppa Italia di Beach Soccer

Tournament details
- City: San Benedetto del Tronto (Marche)
- Dates: June 18, 2025; June 29, 2025
- Teams: 20

Final positions
- Champions: Napoli BS (1st title)
- Runners-up: Viareggio BS

Tournament statistics
- Matches played: 36
- Goals scored: 356 (9.89 per match)
- Top scorer(s): (Spain) Chiky Ardil (11 goals, Catania FC)

=== Preliminary Round ===
Date: 18 June 2023, 16:00 to 21:00
City: Terracina (Lazio)

- Naxos BS v Cagliari BS: 7–3
- Bologna BS v Roma BS: 8–9
- Brancaleone BS v Sakro Crotone BS: 6–5
- Sicilia BS v Faventina: 6–3

=== Round of 16 ===
Date: 26 June 2023, 10:30 to 21:00
City: San Benedetto del Tronto (Marche)

- Icierre Lamezia BS v Terracina BS: 8–12
- Sambenedettese BS vs Chaivari BS: 9–2
- Pisa BS vs Vastese BS: 6–0
- Napoli BS vs Genova BS: 5–2
- Città di Milano BS vs Sicilia BS: 5–2
- Viareggio BS vs Brancaleone BS: 7–1
- Catania BS vs Roma BS: 4–2
- We Beach Catania vs Naxos BS: 9–3

=== Bracket ===
Date: 27–29 June, 10:30 to 21:00
City: San Benedetto del Tronto (Marche)

Quarter-finals
Milano BS | 1
Napoli BS | 6
Catania FC | 5
Terracina BS | 3
Viareggio BS | 8
Pisa BS | 5
Catania BS | 5
Sambenedettese BS | 3

Semi-finals
Napoli BS | 6
Catania FC | 5
Viareggio BS | 6
Catania BS | 5

2025 Coppa Italia Final
Napoli BS | 6
Viareggio BS | 3
Third place
Catania FC | 2
Catania BS | 3

Consolation tournament

5th/8th place Playoff
Milano BS | 3
Terracina BS | 4
Pisa BS | 7
Sambenedettese BS | 3

5th/6th place final
Terracina BS | 2
Pisa BS | 8
7th/8th place Final
Milano BS | 6 (5)
Sambenedettese BS | 6 (4)

- 9th/10th place finale: Genova BS vs Vastese BS: 9–3
- 11th/12th place finale: Naxos BS vs Roma BS: 8–11
- 13th/14th place finale: Icierre Lamezia BS vs Brancaleone BS: 7–3
- 15th/16th place finale: Sicilia BS vs Chiavari BS: 4-4 (5-4 po)

Topscorers

| Rank | Player | Club | Goals |
|---|---|---|---|
| 1 | Chiky Ardil | Catania FC | 11 |
| 2 | Ramy | Terracina BS | 10 |
| 3 | Pablo Perez | Naxos BS | 8 |
| 3 | Bruno Xavier | Viareggio BS | 8 |
| 5 | Miola Alessandro | Roma BS | 7 |
| 5 | Galletta Simone | Brancaleone BS | 7 |

=== 2025 Coppa Italia Final ===
29 June 2025
20:30 CEST

| Napoli BS | 6-3 | Viareggio BS |
|---|---|---|
| Sciacca 2'; Bê Martins 4', 14'; Ovido Alla 12'; Léo Martins 22'; R. Moxedano 36' | Report | Gean Pietro 4'; A. Remedi 22', 35' |

Beach Stadium, San Benedetto del Tronto, Marche (Italy)
Attendance: ???
Referee: Fagnani (Termoli), Ozzella (Benevento) and Vitucci (Sulmona)

| Napoli Beach Soccer | Viareggio Beach Soccer |

Note: in the first third Fabio Sciacca scored a goal and served the assist for the Alla goal with two bicycle kicks.

Napoli Beach Soccer
Players: Alla, Casolare, D'Ascia, Moxedano (is also the chairman) Perotti, Andriani, Scarparo, Paterniti, Be Martins, Sciacca, Leo Martins, Antonio
Manager: Palma

Viareggio Beach Soccer
Players: Carpita, Santini, Fantinato, Moretti, Sassari, Lombardi, Remedi, Genovali, Gean Pietro, Eudin

== 2025 Supercoppa Italiana ==
2nd June 2025
17:00 CEST

| Catania BS | 6-3 | Catania FC |
|---|---|---|
| Ponzetti 12', 33'; Josep Junior 12', 34'; Alison 29 (po)' Giordani V. 33' | Report | Giuffrida 4'; Elliot 5'; Chicky Ardil 31' |

Beach Arena di San Giovanni,
Alghero (Sardinia)
Attendance: ???
Referee: Susanna (Roma), Spezzati (Padova), Ozzella (Benevento) and Pancrazi (Ragusa)

| Catania Beach Soccer | Canalicchio Catania FC |

Catania Beach Soccer
Players: Rafael Padilha, Barbagallo, Catarino, De Nisi, Giordani V., Fred (Cap.), Farinha, Josep Jr., Ponzetti, Joao Silva, Iguinho, Allison
Manager: Fabricio Santos

Catania FC
Players:Coppola, Raciti, Giordani A., Chicky Ardil, Zurlo, D’Amore, Giuffrida Maurizio, Rafinha, Spacca, Randis, Castrianni, Elliot, Duarte
Manager: All: Giuffrida Mario

== 2025 Under-20 Championship ==
=== Regular season ===
2025 Under-20 Italian Beach Soccer League
Campionato Italiano di Beach Soccer U20

Tournament details
- City: Cirò Marina (Final Four); Terracina (Group A/B); San Benedetto del Tronto (Group B)
- Dates: June 11, 2025– August 3, 2025
- Teams: 12

Final positions
- Champions: Napoli BS (League); Viareggio BS (Cup)

Tournament statistics
- Matches played: 34 (League) + 22 (Cup)
- Top scorer(s): (Italy) D'amore Giuseppe; 9 goals (League) (Italy) De Baptistis Nicolo'; 8 goals (Cup)

| Pos | Group A | P.ts | Group B | P.ts |
|---|---|---|---|---|
| 1 | Napoli U20 | 15 | Icierre Lamezia U20 | 10 |
| 2 | Lazio U20 | 12 | Pisa U20 | 9 |
| 3 | Sambenedettese | 7 | Catania BS U20 | 9 |
| 4 | Vasto U20 | 3 | Viareggio U20 | 7 |
| 5 | Cagliari U20 | 3 | Terracina U20 | 3 |
| 6 | Città degli Eventi | 1 | Catania FC U20 | 0 |

=== Final Four ===
Date: 2–3 August 2025, 16:30 to 18:00
City: Cirò Marina (Calabria)

Semi-finals
Napoli U20 | 3
Catania BS | 1
Pisa U20 | 4
Lazio U20 | 5

Final
Napoli U20 | 2
Lazio U20 | 1
Third place
Catania BS | 3
Pisa U20 | 8

=== 2025 Supercoppa Italiana Under-20 ===
14th June 2025
CEST

| Lazio U20 | 5-4 eat | Icierre Lamezia U20 |
|---|---|---|
| Brugi; Sannibale; Romano S. Sannibale | Report | Theodoro; Muracca; Tutino |

Beach Arena “Carlo Guarnieri”,
Terracina (Lazio)
Attendance: ???
Referee: Pedarra (Foggia), Vitucci (Sulmona) and Totaro (Aprilia)

=== 2025 Coppa Italia Under-20 ===
Date: 2–5 July 2025, 16:30 to 18:00
City: San Benedetto del Tronto (Marche)

Round of 16

- Cagliari U20 v Sambenedettese U20: 4–8
- Città Degli Eventi U20 vs Vasto U20: 4–6
- Lazio U20 vs Napoli U20: 2–1
- We Beach Catania U20 vs Terracina U20: 2–4

Quarter-finals

- Pisa U20 vs Terracina U20: 8–3
- Catania BS U20 vs Lazio U20: 3–5
- Viareggio U20 vs Vasto U20: 3–1
- Icierre Lamezia U20 vs Sambenedettese U20: 2–5

5th/8th place Semi-finals

- Terracina U20 vs Icierre Lamezia U20: 2–4
- Catania BS U20 vs Vasto U20: 5–3

1th/4th place Semi-finals

- Lazio U20 vs Viareggio U20: 6-9 po
- Pisa U20 vs Sambenedettese U20: 5–1

=== Final ===
5th July 2025
18:00 CEST

| Pisa U20 | 4-5 | Viareggio U20 |
|---|---|---|
| Filippo Bindi; Tommaso Armadori; Francesco Mogavero; Flavio | Report | Tommaso Belluomini; Matteo Santini |

Beach Stadium,
San Benedetto del Tronto (Marche)
Attendance: ???

3rd/4th place final

- Lazio U20 vs Sambenedettese U20: 6–3

5th/6th place final

- Icierre Lamezia U20 vs Catania BS U20: 4–2

7th/8th place final

- Terracina U20 vs Vasto U20: 8–4

Consolation group
9th: Napoli BS U20 - 6 p.ts (+10 GD)
10th: Catania FC U20 - 6 p.ts (-2 GD)
11th: C. Eventi U20 - 4 p.ts (4 GD)
12th: Cagliari U20 - 0 p.ts (-12 GD)

== 2025 Women Serie A ==
2025 Women Italian Beach Soccer League
Campionato italiano di beach soccer femminile

Tournament details
- City: Cirò Marina (Final Four); Terracina (Group A/B)
- Dates: June 17, 2025– August 3, 2025
- Teams: 6

Final positions
- Champions: Cagliari BSF (League); Lady Terracina (Cup)

Tournament statistics
- Matches played: 10 (League) + 8 (Cup)
- Top scorer(s): (Italy) Galluccio Stephanie; 6+4 goals (League+Cup) (Spain) Manau Gimenez Adriana and Campoy; 4 goals (Cup)

=== Regular season ===
| Pos | Group A | Points | CAG | MIL | VEL | Group B | Points | TER | GEN | COS |
|---|---|---|---|---|---|---|---|---|---|---|
| 1 | Cagliari BSF | 4 | | 3-1 | 8-9* | Lady Terracina | 6 | | 4-3 | 10-1 |
| 2 | Milano BSF | 3 | 1-3 | | 4-3 | Genova Femminile | 3 | 3-4 | | 9-1 |
| 3 | Vjs Velletri femminile | 1 | 9-8* | 3-4 | | Cus Cosenza femminile | 0 | 1-10 | 1-9 | |

=== Final Four ===
Date: 2–3 August 2025, 18:00 to 20:00
City: Cirò Marina (Calabria)

Semi-finals
Cagliari BSF | 3
Genova Femminile | 2
Lady Terracina | 3
Milano BSF | 1

Final
Cagliari BSF | 3
Lady Terracina | 2
Third place
Genova Femminile | 4
Milano BSF | 2

=== 2025 Supercoppa Femminile ===
19th June 2025
CEST

| Cagliari Femminile | 1-2 eat | Lady Terracina |
|---|---|---|
| Vecchioni | Report | Galloni; Olivieri |

Beach Arena "Carlo Guarnieri",
Terracina (Lazio)
Attendance: ???
Referee: Rovere (Biella), Fioravanti (Florence) and Cardone (Agropoli)

=== 2025 Coppa Italia Femminile ===
Date: 8–11 July 2023, 10:30 to 21:00
City: Castellammare di Stabia (Campania)

Group A

- Lady Terracina v Cus Cosenza femminile: 5–0
- Cus Cosenza Femminile v Città di Milano Femminile: 0–7
- Città di Milano Femminile v Lady Terracina: 2-5 po

Group B

- Cagliari Femminile v Vjs Velletri Femminile: 4–1
- Vjs Velletri Femminile v Genova Femminile: 0–6
- Genova Femminile v Cagliari Femminile: 9-10 po

3rd/4th place final

- Città di Milano Femminile v Genova Femminile: 5-6 po

=== Final ===
11th July 2025
21:00 CEST

| Lady Terracina | 4-3 | Cagliari BSF |
|---|---|---|
| Campoy; Penzo; Galluccio | Report | Vecchione; Illiano |

Beach Stadium,
Castellamare di Stabia (Campania)
Attendance: ???
Referee: Volpe (Albenga), Civillo (Salerno) and Piraccini (Cesena)

== See also ==
- Italian Beach Soccer League
- Euro Winners Cup
- World Winners Cup
