= Diego Maradona Jr. =

Italian former footballer and beach soccer player (born 1986)

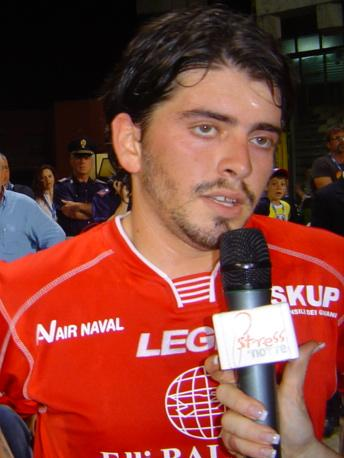
- Maradona Jr. in 2008.

Personal information
- Full name: Diego Armando Maradona Jr.
- Birth name: Diego Armando Sinagra
- Date of birth: 20 September 1986 (age 40)
- Place of birth: Naples, Italy
- Height: 1.68 m (5 ft 6 in)
- Positions: Forward; midfielder

Team information
- Current team: Portici (head coach)

Youth career
- 1997–2004: Napoli
- 2004–2005: Genoa

Senior career*
Years	Team	Apps	(Gls)
2005	Cervia 1920	11	(0)
2006–2007	Puteolana 1902	2	(0)
2007	Quarto	9	(2)
2007–2008	Venafro	14	(2)
2008	Mare di Roma	8	(14)
2008	Boys Caivanese	1	(0)
2009	Napoli Beach Soccer	8	(6)
2009–2011	Quarto	2	(0)
2011	Arzanese	11	(1)
2011–2012	San Sebastiano	8	(4)
2012–2015	San Giorgio	46	(21)
2015	Savoia	3	(0)
2017–2018	Napoli United	8	(0)
2018–2020	Villa Literno	23	(6)
Total		153	(56)

International career
2001	Italy U17	1	(0)
2008–2011	Italy beach soccer	15	(12)

Managerial career
- 2021–2023: Napoli United
- 2023: Pompei
- 2024: Montecalcio
- 2024–2025: Ibarra
- 2025–: Portici
Medal record
Representing Italy
FIFA Beach Soccer World Cup
Silver medal – second place	2008 France
- * Club domestic league appearances and goals

Diego Armando Maradona Jr. (né Sinagra; 20 September 1986) is an Argentine-Italian football coach, former player, and professional beach soccer player, currently in charge of Eccellenza amateurs Portici. He is the son of Cristiana Sinagra and Argentine national footballer Diego Maradona.

== Biography ==
Born in Naples, Italy, Sinagra – nicknamed Diego Jr. or Dieguito – was the result of an out-of-wedlock affair between Maradona and a young local woman named Cristiana Sinagra. He was brought up by his mother. His paternal grandfather Diego Maradona Senior "Chitoro" (1927–2015), who worked at a chemicals factory, was of Indigenous Guaraní and Spanish descent, and his paternal grandmother Dalma Salvadora Franco, "Doña Tota" (1929–2011), had Italian and Croatian ancestry. In 1993, he was legally recognized as Maradona's son by the Court of Naples, acquiring his father's last name as a consequence. Despite that, he did not meet his natural father until 2003, during a golf tournament in Fiuggi. It was only in 2007 that Maradona publicly recognized Diego Jr. as his son, according to the Italian press.

There were rumours that Pope Francis, at that time the Archbishop of Buenos Aires, asked Maradona to recognize Diego Jr. as his son. Maradona's lawyers have denied this allegation.

Maradona had a passion for football and started playing at a young age, showing promise by emulating his father's skills. At 11, he was a part of the Napoli youth squad. He represented Italy at under-17 level. In 2004, the young Maradona joined Genoa 's youth squad for a season.

On 10 June 2015, Maradona married Nunzia Pennino in a Roman Catholic church in Naples and received Pope Francis' blessing.

On 25 August 2016, Maradona publicly recognized Diego Jr. as his son in Argentina and, in front of the media in Buenos Aires, declared, "I love him a lot and he's very like me."

=== Playing in Eccellenza and Serie D ===
Maradona's first-team debut came in the amateur leagues in 2005, when he joined Cervia, a team in the Eccellenza division of Emilia-Romagna, which was the subject of a national football reality show, named Campioni - Il sogno (Champions - The Dream).

He joined Internapoli from Eccellenza Campania in January 2006; after being without a team for the first half of the 2005–06 season, he played just two games for the club due to an injury that kept him sidelined. In 2007, he joined Quarto, another club in the Campanian Eccellenza; Quarto were victorious in the Eccellenza playoffs that season and were promoted to Serie D. He then agreed to stay at Quarto for the 2007–08 Serie D season, then leaving the club by mutual consent on 16 November 2007 following a head coach replacement which caused him concerns about his role in the team. He then signed for Venafro, a Molisan Serie D team, a few weeks later. On 21 January 2008, Maradona scored the first goal with Venafro from 30 metres. At the end of the season Maradona left Venafro and instead signed for a beach soccer team, A.S.D. Mare di Roma.

On 2 December 2008, he signed for Boys Caivanese of Eccellenza Campania. In August 2009 he then signed for Juve Stabia, but on 11 September 2009 he left the team. He then played for Arzanesse.

=== European Beach Soccer ===
On 29 April 2008, Maradona joined the Italy national beach soccer team for the FIFA Beach Soccer World Cup qualification which was held from 11 to 18 May in Spain. On 12 May, he made his debut in the national team in the match against Greece. Maradona played four matches in the Beach Soccer World Cup's qualification and eventually placed Italy fourth, qualifying for the World Cup. In June 2008, he left Venafro, and he was bought by a beach soccer team, A.S.D. Mare di Roma. He debuted in Beach Soccer's Serie A on 27 June 2008, scoring a goal in a match against Alma Juventus Fano. He scored six goals in three matches for Mare di Roma, convincing Italy's coach Giancarlo Magrini to include him in the squad for the 2008 FIFA Beach Soccer World Cup.

Italy eventually placed second in the World Cup, losing 5–3 in the final against Brazil. Maradona scored two goals for Italy in the competition, including one in the final. He scored a dozen goals in the championship, helping his team, Mare di Roma, advance to the final phase of the Italian title competition. Mare di Roma, however, was eliminated in the quarter-finals.

In 2009, Maradona was signed by Napoli Beach Soccer. He scored eight goals, allowing his team to win the Italian beach soccer championship for the first time in its history.

== Coaching career ==
In July 2021, he took on his first head coaching job as manager of Eccellenza amateurs Napoli United, a former team of his as a player (as Afro Napoli United). He resigned from his job on 14 March 2023, as a form of protest following the club's failure to pay on players' wages.

In June 2023, he was appointed the new head coach of Eccellenza Campania club Pompei. He was dismissed from his post on 30 November 2023, with Pompei in second place in the league table. In June 2024, he was hired by fellow Eccellenza Campania club Montecalcio. On 21 October 2024, he left Montecalcio by mutual consent, then signing for Spanish Tercera Federación club Ibarra the next day. He left Ibarra in July 2025 following the club's dissolution, after having guided them to a spot in the promotion playoffs.

On 5 November 2025, Maradona was announced as the new head coach of Eccellenza club Portici.

== Honours ==
=== Club ===
Cervia

- Eccellenza champion: 2004-2005 (group B)

Napoli Beach Soccer

- Italian Beach Soccer League champion: 2009

Catania Beach Soccer

- Italian Supercup champion: 2016

Quarto

- Eccellenza Playoff Winner: 2006–07

=== International ===
Italy Beach Soccer

- FIFA Beach Soccer World Cup runner-up: 2008
