= 2011 Mundialito de Clubes =

I Mundialito de Clubes

Tournament details
- Host country: Brazil
- Dates: 19 – 26 March 2011
- Teams: 10 (from 3 confederations)
- Venue: 1 (in 1 host city)

Final positions
- Champions: (Brazil) Vasco da Gama (1st title)
- Runners-up: (Portugal) Sporting CP
- Third place: (Brazil) Flamengo
- Fourth place: (Russia) Lokomotiv Moscow

Tournament statistics
- Matches played: 28
- Goals scored: 216 (7.71 per match)
- Top scorer(s): (Brazil) André ( (Brazil) Flamengo) (16 goals)
- Best player: (Uruguay) Pampero ( (Brazil) Vasco da Gama)

The inaugural Mundialito de Clubes (or Club World Cup) is a beach soccer tournament that will take place at the Praia do Sol stadium at Represa de Guarapiranga, a reservoir located in São Paulo, Brazil from 19 – 26 March 2011. The stadium will have a seating capacity of 3,500 spectators.

== Participating teams ==
It was determined that ten teams, divided into two groups of five, will take part in the tournament:

GROUP A	GROUP B
(Brazil) Corinthians	(Italy) Milan
(Russia) Lokomotiv Moscow	(Spain) Barcelona
(Brazil) Santos	(Argentina) Boca Juniors
(United States) Seattle Sounders	(Brazil) Flamengo
(Portugal) Sporting CP	(Brazil) Vasco da Gama

It was originally speculated that the newly reformed New York Cosmos of the United States would take part in the tournament and had been later replaced by Shakhtar Donetsk of Ukraine. It was also speculated that Marseille of France would take part as well, but the final spot was disputed between them and Milan. It was also announced at the draw that an as-yet-undetermined fourth Brazilian team will round out the club roster at 10, which was later revealed as Santos.

== Draft procedure ==
On 21 February 2011, at two simultaneous cities (Barcelona, Spain and São Paulo, Brazil), the Official Draft took place, with each team selecting nine players each.

According to the draft procedure, the team representative of every Club is to attend that meeting in one of the two aforementioned venues, and he will be the responsible of picking the players for his squad. All Beach Soccer players can be potentially selected, and, just as it happens in great events for leagues such as the NBA, NHL or Major League Baseball, in order to set a balanced, competitive tournament, the Draft for the players’ election will follow some guidelines.

== Players ==
The 'Draft' followed the following criteria: three national players (chosen beforehand), three continental players (up two from the same country), a player UEFA / CONMEBOL (South America and Europe), a player from AFC / CAF / CONCACAF / OFC (Asia / Africa / North America and the Caribbean / Oceania) player and a 'national'.

== Squads ==
=== Barcelona ===
Coach: Ramiro Amarelle
(Spain) Juanma	(Spain); Barcelona	(Poland) Witold Ziober
(Spain) Javier Torres	(Spain); Barcelona	(Brazil) Fred
(Spain) Nico	(Spain); Barcelona	(Japan) Tomoya Ginoza
(Russia) Andrei Bukhlitskiy (GK)	(Spain); Barcelona	(Spain) Ramiro Amarelle
(Russia) Dmitry Shishin	(Spain); Barcelona	(Brazil) Rui Mota

=== Boca Juniors ===
Coach: Casado
(Argentina) Cesar Leguizamon	(Argentina); Boca Juniors	(Argentina) Adielson
(Argentina) Luciano Franceschini	(Argentina); Boca Juniors	(Mexico) Victor Lopez
(Argentina) Agustin Dallera	(Argentina); Boca Juniors	(Italy) Simone Del Mestre
(Uruguay) Nicolas Bella	(Argentina); Boca Juniors	(Argentina) Javier Vivas
(Brazil) Bruno Malías	(Argentina); Boca Juniors	(Argentina) Sebastian Gomez Polatti

=== Corinthians ===
Coach: Alexandre Soares
(Brazil) Mão (GK)	(Brazil); Corinthians	(Argentina) Cesar Mendoza
(Brazil) Buru	(Brazil); Corinthians	(Germany) Dannilo Neumann
(Brazil) Benjamin	(Brazil); Corinthians	(Oman) Yahya Al-Araimi
(Argentina) Minichi	(Brazil); Corinthians	(Brazil) Raphael
(Uruguay) Fabian	(Brazil); Corinthians	(Brazil) Juninho Alagoano

=== Flamengo ===
Coach: Andrey Valerio
(Brazil) Souza	(Brazil); Flamengo	(Brazil) Anderson Tavares
(Brazil) Anderson	(Brazil); Flamengo	(Italy) Bernardo Tell
(Brazil) André	(Brazil); Flamengo	(Mexico) Miguel Estrada
(Uruguay) Diego Alberto Montserrat (GK)	(Brazil); Flamengo	(Brazil) Duda
(Uruguay) Matías Isaias Cabrera	(Brazil); Flamengo	

=== Lokomotiv Moscow ===
Coach: Ilya Leonov
(Russia) Ilya Leonov	(Russia); Lokomotiv Moscow	(Ukraine) Vitaliy Sydorenko (GK)
(Russia) Anton Shkarin	(Russia); Lokomotiv Moscow	(Brazil) Daniel Lima
(Russia) Egor Shaykov	(Russia); Lokomotiv Moscow	(United Arab Emirates) Humaid Jamal
(Romania) Maci	(Russia); Lokomotiv Moscow	(Russia) Yuri Gorchinskiy
(Ukraine) Igor Borsuk	(Russia); Lokomotiv Moscow	(Russia) Alexei Smertin

=== Milan ===
Coach: Pannizza
(Italy) Roberto Pasquali	(Italy); Milan	(Switzerland) Stephan Meier
(Italy) Michele Zanini (GK)	(Italy); Milan	(Brazil) Juninho Erivaldo Santos
(Italy) Ahmed	(Italy); Milan	(Brazil) Claudinho (Claudio Batista)
(Switzerland) Dejan Stankovic	(Italy); Milan	(Italy) Marco Casarsa
(France) Stephane François	(Italy); Milan	(El Salvador) Jose E. Portillo

=== Santos ===
Coach: Gustavo Zloccowick
(Brazil) Du Alves	(Brazil); Santos	(Uruguay) Capurro
(Brazil) Wellington	(Brazil); Santos	(Spain) Kuman
(Brazil) Dunga	(Brazil); Santos	(Brazil) Tony
(Uruguay) Fabricio (GK)	(Brazil); Santos	(Brazil) Ricardinho
(Chile) José Ignacio Mena	(Brazil); Santos	(El Salvador) Baudillo Guardado

=== Seattle Sounders ===
Coach: Marcelo Mendes
(United States) Michael McAndrews	(United States); Seattle Sounders	(El Salvador) Frank (Francisco Velasquez)
(Brazil) Gil	(United States); Seattle Sounders	(Switzerland) Nico Jung (GK)
(United States) Yuri Morales	(United States); Seattle Sounders	(United Arab Emirates) Ali Karim
(Mexico) Francisco Cati	(United States); Seattle Sounders	(United States) Francis Farberhoff
(Mexico) Morgan Plata	(United States); Seattle Sounders	(Japan) Ozu Moreira

=== Sporting CP ===
Coach: Bilro
(Portugal) Madjer	(Portugal); Sporting CP	(Poland) Boguslaw Saganowski
(Portugal) Alan	(Portugal); Sporting CP	(Brazil) Fernando DDI
(Portugal) Belchior	(Portugal); Sporting CP	(Brazil) Bruno Xavier
(Italy) Michele Leghissa	(Portugal); Sporting CP	(Portugal) Paulo Graça (GK)
(Italy) Francesco Corosiniti	(Portugal); Sporting CP	(Brazil) Leandro Fanta

=== Vasco da Gama ===
Coach: Gilberto da Costa
(Brazil) Betinho	(Brazil); Vasco da Gama	(Uruguay) Gustavo Sebe
(Brazil) Bruno Xavier	(Brazil); Vasco da Gama	(Portugal) Bernardo Botelho
(Brazil) Jorginho	(Brazil); Vasco da Gama	(Mexico) Ricardo Villalobos
(Uruguay) Pampero	(Brazil); Vasco da Gama	(Brazil) Gabriel
(Argentina) Marcelo Salgueiro (GK)	(Brazil); Vasco da Gama	(Brazil) Rafinha

== Group stage ==
The draw to divide the ten teams into the following two groups was conducted on 3 March 2011. The group stage commenced on 19 March 2011 and consisted of each team playing each other once in a single round-robin format.

All kickoff times are listed as local time in São Paulo, (UTC-3).

=== Group A ===
Team	Pld	W	W+	L	GF	GA	GD	Pts
(Russia) Lokomotiv Moscow	4	2	2	0	18	15	+3	10
(Brazil) Corinthians	4	1	2	1	20	19	+1	7
(United States) Seattle Sounders	4	1	0	3	12	10	+2	3
(Portugal) Sporting CP	4	1	0	3	12	13	−1	3
(Brazil) Santos	4	0	1	3	16	21	−5	2

19 March 2011
08:30

Lokomotiv Moscow (Russia)	3 – 2 (1 – 1, 1 – 1, 1 – 0)	(United States) Seattle Sounders
Maci 5'; I. Borsuk 18'; E. Shaykov 31'	Report	Frank 10'; Y. Morales 17'

Represa de Guarapiranga, São Paulo

19 March 2011
10:00

Corinthians (Brazil)	4 – 3 (1 – 1, 1 – 2, 2 – 0)	(Portugal) Sporting CP
Juninho Alagoano 4', 34'; Minici 24'; Buru 33'	Report	Belchior 1'; Fernando DDI 14'; Bruno Xavier 21'

Represa de Guarapiranga, São Paulo

20 March 2011
08:30

Lokomotiv Moscow (Russia)	4 – 3 (a.e.t.) (1 – 1, 1 – 0, 1 – 2, 1 – 0)	(Brazil) Santos
Maci 4'; D. Lima 13'; E. Shaykov 27', 37'	Report	Dunga 4', 25', 30'

Represa de Guarapiranga, São Paulo

20 March 2011
12:30

Corinthians (Brazil)	2 – 2 (a.e.t.) (1 – 2, 1 – 0, 0 – 0, 0 – 0)	(United States) Seattle Sounders
Buru 12'; Juninho Alagoano 13'	Report	Y. Morales 3'; F. Cati 9'
Penalties
Juninho Alagoano (penalty scored); Benjamin (penalty scored)	2–1	(penalty scored) O. Moreira; (penalty missed) Frank

Represa de Guarapiranga, São Paulo

21 March 2011
13:00

Seattle Sounders (United States)	4 – 0 (2 – 0, 1 – 0, 1 – 0)	(Portugal) Sporting CP
O. Moreira 2', 32'; F. Cati 4', 16'	Report

Represa de Guarapiranga, São Paulo

21 March 2011
16:45

Santos (Brazil)	8 – 8 (a.e.t.) (3 – 3, 3 – 3, 1 – 1, 1 – 1)	(Brazil) Corinthians
Dunga 2'; Kuman 10', 10', 24'; Fabricio 17'; Du Alves 23'; J. Mena 29', 39'	Report	Buru 2', 10'; Fabian 5', 23'; Juninho Alagoano 13', 32', 37'; Minici 13'
Penalties
Kuman (penalty missed)	0–1	(penalty scored) Fabian

Represa de Guarapiranga, São Paulo

22 March 2011
13:00

Lokomotiv Moscow (Russia)	5 – 4 (1 – 0, 3 – 1, 1 – 3)	(Portugal) Sporting CP
E. Shaykov 12', 33'; Y. Gorchinskiy 18'; D. Lima 19', 22'	Report	B. Saganowski 23'; Fernando DDI 26'; M. Leghissa 28'; Alan 31'

Represa de Guarapiranga, São Paulo

22 March 2011
15:30

Santos (Brazil)	4 – 3 (a.e.t.) (2 – 0, 0 – 1, 1 – 2, 1 – 0)	(United States) Seattle Sounders
Ricardinho 24'; Kuman 26'; J. Mena 27', 39'	Report	Y. Morales 6'; Ali Karim 8'; Frank 31'

Represa de Guarapiranga, São Paulo

23 March 2011
14:15

Santos (Brazil)	0 – 5 (0 – 0, 0 – 3, 0 – 2)	(Portugal) Sporting CP
	Report	Fernando DDI 13', 26', 28'; Belchior 15', 15'

Represa de Guarapiranga, São Paulo

23 March 2011
15:30

Lokomotiv Moscow (Russia)	6 – 6 (a.e.t.) (1 – 1, 3 – 2, 2 – 3, 0 – 0)	(Brazil) Corinthians
E. Shaykov 11', 13'; Maci 17'; I. Borsuk 21'; D. Lima 35', 36'	Report	Y. Al-Araimi 6', 30'; Fabian 17'; Benjamin 23'; D. Neumann 25'; Minici 35'
Penalties
I. Leonov (penalty scored); Y. Gorchinskiy (penalty scored)	2–1	(penalty scored) Fabian; (penalty missed) Minici

Represa de Guarapiranga, São Paulo

=== Group B ===
Team	Pld	W	W+	L	GF	GA	GD	Pts
(Spain) Barcelona	4	3	0	1	19	13	+6	9
(Brazil) Flamengo	4	2	1	1	19	11	+8	8
(Italy) Milan	4	1	1	2	13	16	−3	5
(Brazil) Vasco da Gama	4	0	2	2	16	18	−2	4
(Argentina) Boca Juniors	4	0	0	4	11	20	−9	0

19 March 2011
11:15

Boca Juniors (Argentina)	4 – 4 (a.e.t.) (1 – 1, 2 – 0, 1 – 3, 0 – 0)	(Italy) Milan
Bruno Malías 6'; V. Lopez 14'; L. Franceschini 19', 36'	Report	Juninho Erivaldo Santos 10'; Claudinho 27'; S. François 29'; D. Stankovic 30'
Penalties
A. Dallera (penalty scored) , (penalty scored); L. Franceschini (penalty scored) , (penalty missed); N. Bella (penalty scored); V. Lopez (penalty scored); C. Leguizamon (penalty scored); Bruno Malías (penalty scored); J. Vivas (penalty scored); S. Del Mestre (penalty scored)	9–10	(penalty scored) , (penalty scored) D. Stankovic; (penalty scored) , (penalty scored) Claudinho; (penalty scored) Ahmed; (penalty scored) S. François; (penalty scored) S. Meier; (penalty scored) M. Casarsa; (penalty scored) R. Pasquali; (penalty scored) M. Zanini

Represa de Guarapiranga, São Paulo

19 March 2011
12:30

Vasco da Gama (Brazil)	4 – 5 (2 – 0, 0 – 2, 2 – 3)	(Spain) Barcelona
Betinho 6'; Rafinha 10'; Bruno Xavier 31'; Pampero 32'	Report	D. Shishin 18', 19', 35'; Gabriel (o.g.) 33'; Javi Torres 36'

Represa de Guarapiranga, São Paulo

20 March 2011
10:00

Flamengo (Brazil)	3 – 2 (a.e.t.) (0 – 0, 2 – 2, 0 – 0, 1 – 0)	(Italy) Milan
Anderson 13'; André 17', 37'	Report	D. Stankovic 16'; S. François 20'

Represa de Guarapiranga, São Paulo

20 March 2011
11:15

Vasco da Gama (Brazil)	3 – 3 (a.e.t.) (0 – 2, 2 – 0, 1 – 1, 0 – 0)	(Argentina) Boca Juniors
Gabriel 18'; Jorginho 22'; Rafinha 35'	Report	Bruno Malías 1'; N. Bella 7'; L. Franceschini 35'
Penalties
Gabriel (penalty scored); R. Villalobos (penalty scored); Betinho (penalty scored)	3–2	(penalty scored) A. Dallera; (penalty scored) N. Bella; (penalty missed) V. Lopez

Represa de Guarapiranga, São Paulo

21 March 2011
14:15

Barcelona (Spain)	7 – 2 (2 – 1, 1 – 0, 4 – 1)	(Argentina) Boca Juniors
Juanma 5', 29', 30'; Javi Torres 6'; D. Shishin 23', 33'; Rui Mota 25'	Report	Bruno Malias 3'; L. Franceschini 34'

Represa de Guarapiranga, São Paulo

21 March 2011
15:30

Vasco da Gama (Brazil)	6 – 6 (a.e.t.) (0 – 1, 3 – 2, 2 – 2, 1 – 1)	(Brazil) Flamengo
Bruno Xavier 17', 38'; Pampero 17'; B. Botelho 22'; R. Villalobos 25'; Rafinha 36'	Report	Anderson 8', 20', 22'; André 26', 29'; Duda 38'
Penalties
Bruno Xavier (penalty scored); Gabriel (penalty missed); Betinho (penalty scored)	2–1	(penalty scored) Andre; (penalty missed) Duda; (penalty missed) Souza

Represa de Guarapiranga, São Paulo

22 March 2011
14:15

Barcelona (Spain)	6 – 3 (4 – 0, 0 – 1, 2 – 2)	(Italy) Milan
Fred 2'; D. Shishin 4', 10', 34', 36'; Nico 7'	Report	S. Meier 18', 26'; S. Francois 35'

Represa de Guarapiranga, São Paulo

22 March 2011
16:45

Flamengo (Brazil)	6 – 2 (2 – 1, 2 – 1, 2 – 0)	(Argentina) Boca Juniors
André 5', 10', 17', 23', 32'; C. Longa 30'	Report	Bruno Malias 7'; V. Lopez 23'

Represa de Guarapiranga, São Paulo

23 March 2011
13:00

Vasco da Gama (Brazil)	3 – 4 (1 – 0, 0 – 2, 2 – 2)	(Italy) Milan
Betinho 7'; Bruno Xavier 28'; Pampero 30'	Report	S. Meier 15', 36'; D. Stankovic 19'; Ahmed 30'

Represa de Guarapiranga, São Paulo

23 March 2011
16:45

Flamengo (Brazil)	4 – 1 (2 – 1, 0 – 0, 2 – 0)	(Spain) Barcelona
Anderson 1'; C. Longa 12'; André 26', 27'	Report	Javi Torres 6'

Represa de Guarapiranga, São Paulo

== Knockout stage ==
A draw was held after the group stage matches were completed to determine the quarterfinal pairings.

Quarter-finals
24 March 2011
(Brazil) Flamengo	2 (5)
(United States) Seattle Sounders	2 (4)
24 March 2011
(Brazil) Corinthians	2
(Brazil) Vasco da Gama	5
24 March 2011
(Russia) Lokomotiv Moscow	7
(Italy) Milan	2
24 March 2011
(Spain) Barcelona	1
(Portugal) Sporting CP	8

Semi-finals
25 March 2011
(Brazil) Flamengo	4
(Brazil) Vasco da Gama	5
25 March 2011
(Russia) Lokomotiv Moscow	4
(Portugal) Sporting CP	5

Final
26 March 2011
(Brazil) Vasco da Gama	4
(Portugal) Sporting CP	2
Third place
26 March 2011
(Brazil) Flamengo (a.e.t.)	5
(Russia) Lokomotiv Moscow	4

=== Quarter finals ===
24 March 2011
13:00

Flamengo (Brazil)	2 – 2 (a.e.t.) (1 – 2, 0 – 0, 1 – 0, 0 – 0)	(United States) Seattle Sounders
Anderson 1', 27'	Report	Frank 9'; Ali Karim 12'
Penalties
André (penalty scored); Anderson (penalty scored); Duda (penalty scored); Souza (penalty scored); Matias (penalty scored)	5–4	(penalty scored) Ali Karim; (penalty scored) F. Farberhoff; (penalty scored) Y. Morales; (penalty scored) F. Cati; (penalty missed) Gil

Represa de Guarapiranga, São Paulo

24 March 2011
14:15

Barcelona (Spain)	1 – 8 (1 – 3, 0 – 2, 0 – 3)	(Portugal) Sporting CP
R. Amarelle 3'	Report	Fernando DDI 1', 1', 5'; B. Saganowski 22'; F. Corosiniti 23'; Alan 30', 35'; Madjer 31'

Represa de Guarapiranga, São Paulo

24 March 2011
15:30

Lokomotiv Moscow (Russia)	7 – 2 (1 – 0, 4 – 1, 2 – 1)	(Italy) Milan
D. Lima 8'; A. Shkarin 14'; I. Borsuk 17', 18'; I. Leonov 21'; Y. Gorchinskiy 29'; Maci 36'	Report	Ahmed 18'; Claudinho 35'

Represa de Guarapiranga, São Paulo

24 March 2011
16:45

Corinthians (Brazil)	2 – 5 (0 – 0, 0 – 2, 2 – 3)	(Brazil) Vasco da Gama
Buru 31', 34'	Report	Pampero 16'; Betinho 17'; Bruno Xavier 25'; Rafinha 32'; Gabriel 34'

Represa de Guarapiranga, São Paulo

=== Semi finals ===
25 March 2011
15:30

Lokomotiv Moscow (Russia)	4 – 5 (0 – 1, 1 – 3, 3 – 1)	(Portugal) Sporting CP
I. Leonov 13'; E. Shaykov 29', 36'; I. Borsuk 32'	Report	Alan 5', 13'; Belchior 13'; Madjer 23'; Fernando DDI 30'

Represa de Guarapiranga, São Paulo

25 March 2011
16:45

Flamengo (Brazil)	4 – 5 (1 – 2, 1 – 2, 2 – 1)	(Brazil) Vasco da Gama
André 5', 14', 25', 34'	Report	Betinho 2'; Bruno Xavier 3', 19'; Pampero 14', 28'

Represa de Guarapiranga, São Paulo

=== Third place playoff ===
26 March 2011
08:30

Flamengo (Brazil)	5 – 4 (a.e.t.) (0 – 1, 2 – 2, 2 – 1, 1 – 0)	(Russia) Lokomotiv Moscow
Souza 13', 37'; André 17'; Anderson 27'; A. Tavares 34'	Report	Maci 7', 33'; I. Leonov 13', 23'

Represa de Guarapiranga, São Paulo

=== Final ===
26 March 2011
10:00

Vasco da Gama (Brazil)	4 – 2 (2 – 1, 0 – 0, 2 – 1)	(Portugal) Sporting CP
Bruno Xavier 9'; Rafinha 10'; Pampero 28'; Betinho 35'	Report	Fernando DDI 1'; Belchior 29'

Represa de Guarapiranga, São Paulo

== Winners ==
I Mundialito de Clubes Beach Soccer

Winners:

Vasco da Gama
First title

== Awards ==
Best Player (MVP)
(Uruguay) Pampero ( (Brazil) Vasco da Gama)
Top Scorer
(Brazil) André ( (Brazil) Flamengo)
16 goals
Best Goalkeeper
(Portugal) Paulo Graça ( (Portugal) Sporting CP)

== Final placement ==
	Team
1st Place	(Brazil) Vasco da Gama
2nd Place	(Portugal) Sporting CP
3rd Place	(Brazil) Flamengo
4th Place	(Russia) Lokomotiv Moscow
5th Place	(Spain) Barcelona
6th Place	(Brazil) Corinthians
7th Place	(Italy) Milan
8th Place	(United States) Seattle Sounders
9th Place	(Brazil) Santos
10th Place	(Argentina) Boca Juniors

== Goal scorers ==
16 goals

- (Brazil) André ( (Brazil) Flamengo)

10 goals

- (Brazil) Fernando DDI ( (Portugal) Sporting CP)

9 goals

- (Russia) Dmitry Shishin ( (Spain) Barcelona)
- (Russia) Egor Shaykov ( (Russia) Lokomotiv Moscow)

8 goals

- (Brazil) Anderson ( (Brazil) Flamengo)

7 goals

- (Brazil) Juninho Alagoano ( (Brazil) Corinthians)
- (Brazil) Bruno Xavier ( (Brazil) Vasco da Gama)
- (Uruguay) Pampero ( (Brazil) Vasco da Gama)

6 goals

- (Brazil) Daniel Lima ( (Russia) Lokomotiv Moscow)
- (Romania) Maci ( (Russia) Lokomotiv Moscow)

5 goals

- (Brazil) Buru ( (Brazil) Corinthians)
- (Ukraine) Igor Borsuk ( (Russia) Lokomotiv Moscow)
- (Portugal) Alan ( (Portugal) Sporting CP)
- (Brazil) Rafinha ( (Brazil) Vasco da Gama)
- (Portugal) Belchior ( (Portugal) Sporting CP)
- (Brazil) Betinho ( (Brazil) Vasco da Gama)

4 goals

- (Brazil) Dunga ( (Brazil) Santos)
- (Spain) Kuman ( (Brazil) Santos)
- (Brazil) Bruno Malías ( (Argentina) Boca Juniors)
- (Switzerland) Stephan Meier ( (Italy) Milan)
- (Chile) Jose Mena ( (Brazil) Santos)
- (Argentina) Luciano Franceschini ( (Argentina) Boca Juniors)
- (El Salvador) Frank ( (United States) Seattle Sounders)
- (Russia) Ilya Leonov ( (Russia) Lokomotiv Moscow)

3 goals

- (Argentina) Minici ( (Brazil) Corinthians)
- (Mexico) Francisco Cati ( (United States) Seattle Sounders)
- (Brazil) Juanma ( (Spain) Barcelona)
- (United States) Yuri Morales ( (United States) Seattle Sounders)
- (Switzerland) Dejan Stankovic ( (Italy) Milan)
- (Spain) Javi Torres ( (Spain) Barcelona)
- (Uruguay) Fabian ( (Brazil) Corinthians)

2 goals

- (Mexico) Victor Lopez ( (Argentina) Boca Juniors)
- (France) Stephane François ( (Italy) Milan)
- (Portugal) Madjer ( (Portugal) Sporting CP)
- (Oman) Yahya Al-Araimi ( (Brazil) Corinthians)
- (Venezuela) Carlos Longa ( (Brazil) Flamengo)
- (Brazil) Osmar Moreira ( (United States) Seattle Sounders)
- (Italy) Ahmed ( (Italy) Milan)
- (Brazil) Claudinho ( (Italy) Milan)
- (Brazil) Gabriel ( (Brazil) Vasco da Gama)
- (Russia) Yuri Gorchinskiy ( (Russia) Lokomotiv Moscow)
- (United Arab Emirates) Ali Karim ( (United States) Seattle Sounders)
- (Poland) Boguslaw Saganowski ( (Portugal) Sporting CP)
- (Mexico) Ricardo Villalobos ( (Brazil) Vasco da Gama)
- (Brazil) Souza ( (Brazil) Flamengo)

1 goal

- (Brazil) Du Alves ( (Brazil) Santos)
- (Uruguay) Nicolas Bella ( (Argentina) Boca Juniors)
- (Brazil) Benjamin ( (Brazil) Corinthians)
- (Portugal) Bernardo Botelho ( (Brazil) Vasco da Gama)
- (Brazil) Duda ( (Brazil) Flamengo)
- (Brazil) Anderson Tavares ( (Brazil) Flamengo)
- (Uruguay) Fabricio ( (Brazil) Santos)
- (Brazil) Fred ( (Spain) Barcelona)
- (Brazil) Jorginho ( (Brazil) Vasco da Gama)
- (Italy) Michele Leghissa ( (Portugal) Sporting CP)
- (Brazil) Rui Mota ( (Spain) Barcelona)
- (Germany) Dannilo Neumann ( (Brazil) Corinthians)
- (Spain) Nico ( (Spain) Barcelona)
- (Brazil) Ricardinho ( (Brazil) Santos)
- (Brazil) Juninho Erivaldo Santos ( (Italy) Milan)
- (Canada) Bruno Xavier ( (Portugal) Sporting CP)

Own goal

- (Brazil) Gabriel (for Barcelona (Spain) )

== See also ==
- Beach soccer
- Beach Soccer Worldwide
