= 2023 World Winners Cup =

International beach soccer/football competition

2023 BSWW World Winners Cup

Tournament details
- Cities: Alghero, Italy
- Dates: September 26, 2023– October 1, 2023
- Teams: 24

Final positions
- Champions: (Italy) Napoli BS (1st title)
- Runners-up: (Latvia) Riga FC
- Third place: (Cyprus) Pafos BSC
- Fourth place: (Spain) Bahia de Mazarron

Tournament statistics
- Matches played: 60
- Goals scored: 584 (9.73 per match)
- Top scorer(s): (Brazil) Alison; 14 goals (Pafos FC)
- Best player: (Brazil) Lucão (Napoli BS)
- Best goalkeeper: (Italy) Barbino (Napoli BS)

The 2023 World Winners Cup was the third edition of World's premier beach soccer club competition, the World Winners Cup, contested in Alghero from 26 September to 1st October 2023 and won by Napoli Beach Soccer in a 6–3 final against Riga FC (Riga BSC).

The Azzurri victory was the first world achievement for a Campania club and the first one for Italy in any BSWW worldwide event.

This was the second edition of the tournament held in Sardegna after the 2022 WWC organized in Cagliari. This was the second major event held in Alghero after 2023 EBSL Superfinal. The small city near Sassari hosted also the 2024 World Winners Cup and EBSL finals.

== Group stage ==
Originally, Minots de Marseille the 32 clubs would compete in the 2023 WWC (8 groups of 4 teams) but they were reduce to 24 so two groups were dropped: Kebbi BS was drawn in Group H but the French club played in the Napoli BS group.

=== Group A ===
Pos	Team	Pld	W	D	L	GF	GA	GD	Pts	Qualification or relegation
1	(Italy) ASD Napoli	3	3	0	0	25	7	+18	9	Round of 16
2	(Denmark) Copenhagen BSC	3	2	0	1	14	4	+10	6	Round of 16
3	(Nigeria) Kebbi BS	3	1	0	2	21	12	+9	3	Round of 16
4	(France) BS Vion	3	0	0	3	3	40	−37	0	

Source: Beach Soccer Worldwide
- 26 September 2023
  - Vion v Napoli 2–16
  - Kebbi v Copenhagen 2–4
- 27 September 2023
  - Copenhagen v Vion 9–0
  - Napoli v Kebbi 7–4
- 28 September 2023
  - Kebbi v Vion 15–1
  - Napoli v Copenhagen 2–1

=== Group B ===
Pos	Team	Pld	W	D	L	GF	GA	GD	Pts	Qualification or relegation
1	(China) Dalian BST	3	3	0	0	24	6	+18	9	Round of 16
2	(Germany) Real Munster	3	2	0	1	23	15	+8	6	Round of 16
3	(Belgium) FC Genappe	3	1	0	2	8	15	−7	3	
4	(Italy) Naxos BS	3	0	0	3	6	25	−19	0	

Source: Beach Soccer Worldwide

=== Group C ===
Pos	Team	Pld	W	D	L	GF	GA	GD	Pts	Qualification or relegation
1	(Italy) Catania FC	3	3	0	0	28	8	+20	9	Round of 16
2	(Israel) Falfala KQ	3	2	0	1	18	10	+8	6	Round of 16
3	Canada BSC	3	1	0	2	15	17	−2	3	
4	(Portugal) CB Viseu	3	0	0	3	6	32	−26	0	

Source: Beach Soccer Worldwide

=== Group D ===
Pos	Team	Pld	W	D	L	GF	GA	GD	Pts	Qualification or relegation
1	(Spain) Recreativo de Huelva	3	3	0	0	14	5	+9	9	Round of 16
2	(Greece) Napoli Patron BSC	3	1	0	2	8	6	+2	3	Round of 16
3	(Latvia) Riga FC	3	1	0	2	10	11	−1	3	Round of 16
4	(Belgium) Newteam Brussels	3	1	0	2	7	17	−10	3	

Source: Beach Soccer Worldwide
- 26 September 2023
  - Riga FC v Napoli Patron BSC 3–2
  - Newteam Brussels v Recreativo Huelta 1–8
- 27 September 2023
  - Recreativo Huelta v Riga FC 3–2
  - Napoli Patron BSC v Newteam Brussels 4–0
- 28 September 2023
  - Newteam Brussels v Riga FC 6–5
  - Recreativo Huelta v Napoli Patron BSC 3–2

=== Group E ===
Pos	Team	Pld	W	D	L	GF	GA	GD	Pts	Qualification or relegation
1	(Spain) Bahia de Mazzaron	3	3	0	0	23	8	+15	9	Round of 16
2	(Ukraine) BSC Vybir	3	2	0	1	13	10	+3	6	Round of 16
3	(France) Marseille BT	3	1	0	2	16	16	0	3	Round of 16
4	(Italy) Bologna BS	3	0	0	3	9	27	−18	0	

Source: Beach Soccer Worldwide

=== Group F ===
Pos	Team	Pld	W	D	L	GF	GA	GD	Pts	Qualification or relegation
1	(Ukraine) BSC Artur Music	3	3	0	0	16	13	+3	9	Round of 16
2	(Honduras) Barra de Santiago	3	2	0	1	18	13	+5	6	Round of 16
3	(Cyprus) Pafos BSC	3	1	0	2	18	19	−1	3	Round of 16
4	(United States) Cali BSC	3	0	0	3	11	18	−7	0	

Source: Beach Soccer Worldwide

== Knockout stage ==
=== Round of 16 ===
29 September 2023
09:00

(Spain) Bahia DM	8-1	(Nigeria) Kebbi BSC

29 September 2023
10:15

(Germany) Real Munstler	5-4	(Greece) Napoli Patrol BSC

29 September 2023
11:30

(China) Dalian	4-5	(Cyprus) Pafos BSC

29 September 2023
12:45

(Spain) Recreativo Huelta	6-5	(Israel) Falfala KQ

29 September 2023
14:00

(Denmark) Copenhagen BSC	5-6	(El Salvador) Barra de Santiago

29 September 2023
15:15

(Ukraine) BSC Artur Music	6-4	(Ukraine) BSC Vybir

29 September 2023
16:30

(Italy) Napoli BS	15-1	(France) Marseille BT
	Report

29 September 2023
17:45

(Italy) Catania FC	4-4 (2-4)	(Latvia) Riga FC
	Report

=== Bracket ===
Quarter-finals
30 September – Alghero, 8:30 am
(Cyprus) Pafos FC	3
(Spain) Recreativo Huelta	1
30 September – Alghero, 9:45 am
(Italy) Napoli BS	5
(El Salvador) Barra de Santiago	3
30 September – Alghero, 11:00 am
(Spain) Bahia DM	6
(Germany) Real Munstler	5
30 September – Alghero, 12:15 am
(Ukraine) BSC Artur Music	3
(Latvia) Riga FC	5

Semi-finals
30 September – Alghero, 4:30 pm
(Cyprus) Pafos FC	2
(Italy) Napoli Beach Soccer	4
30 September – Alghero, 5:45 pm
(Spain) Bahia de Mazarrón	4 (3)
(Latvia) Riga FC	4 (4)

Final
1st October – Alghero, 5:45 pm
(Italy) Napoli Beach Soccer	6
(Latvia) Riga FC	3
Third place play-off
10 July – Alghero, 3:15 pm
(Cyprus) Pafos FC	6
(Spain) Bahia de Mazarrón	3

== Quarter-finals ==
30 September 2023
08:30

(Cyprus) Pafos BSC	3-1	(Spain) Recreativo Huelta
	Report

30 September 2023
9:45

(Italy) Napoli BS	5-3	(El Salvador) Barra de Santiago
Zurlo; Lucão	Report	Andersson Velasquez; Heber

30 September 2023
11:00

(Spain) Bahia DM	6-5	(Germany) Real Munstler
	Report

30 September 2023
12:15

(Ukraine) BSC Artur Music	3-5	(Latvia) Riga FC
	Report

== Semi-finals ==
=== Pafos BSC vs Napoli BS ===
30 September 2023
16:30 CEST

(Cyprus) Pafos BSC	2-4	(Italy) Napoli BS
Alison 9', 26'	Report	Alejandro 4'; Fabio Sciacca 8', 34'; Paterniti 8'

Main Stadium, Alghero, Italy
Referee: Sergio Filipe Gomes Soares

Pafos BSC	Napoli BS

=== Bahia de Mazarrón vs Riga FC ===
30 September 2023
17:45 CEST

(Spain) Bahia DM	4-4 (a.e.t.)	(Latvia) Riga FC
Rafihna 1'; Igor Ricardo 7', 16'; E. Bernardo 14'	Report	B. Bernardo 14'; Jaime Vera 27', 28'; Jose Oliver 30'
Penalties
	3-4

Main Stadium, Alghero, Italy
Referee: Vitalij Gomolko

Bahia de Mazarrón	Riga FC

== Third place play-off ==
=== Pafos BSC vs Bahia DM ===
1st October 2023
15:15 CEST

(Cyprus) Pafos BSC	6-3	(Spain) Bahia DM
Jordan 1', 4', 6', 7', 19'; Alison 18'	Report	Suli Batis 13'; CàNovas 14'; Jaime Vera 36'

Main Stadium, Alghero, Italy
Referee: Mehdi Sayoud

Pafos BSC	Bahia de Mazarrón

== Final ==
=== Napoli BS vs Riga FC ===
1st October 2023
17:45 CEST

(Italy) Napoli BS	6-3	(Latvia) Riga FC
Zurlo 2'; Lucão 4', 28'; Sciacca 14'; Palmacci 17'; Sanfilippo 21'	Report	Bernardo 7'; Wesley Silva 10'; Vasiljev 29'

Main Stadium, Alghero, Italy
Attendance: ???
Referee: Lukasz Ostrowski (Poland)

Napoli BS	Riga FC

Winning team: Sebastiano Paterniti Barbino and Paolo Palmacci (GK), Antonio Bernardo De Farias Junior, Salvatore Sanfilippo (DEF), Ovidio Alla, Alejandro Sydney Sales, Francesco Fabio Sciacca, Lucas Azevedo (Lucão) and Emmanuele Zurlo (FOW)
Manager: Andrea Sannino, Aurelio Venditto (ass.)
Chairman/Player: Raffaele Moxedano

== Consolation tournaments ==
=== 5th-8th place Playoff ===
5th/8th place Playoff
30 September – Alghero, 4:30 pm
(Spain) Recreativo Huelta	6 (5)
(El Salvador) Barra de Santiago	6 (6)
30 September – Alghero, 5:45 pm
(Germany) Real Munstler	6
(Spain) Recreativo Huelta	9

5th/6th place final
1st October – Alghero, 12:45 am
(El Salvador) Barra de Santiago	5
(Germany) Real Munstler	9
7th/8th place Final
10 July – Alghero, 11:30 am
(Spain) Recreativo Huelta	2
(Ukraine) BSC Artur Music	5

=== 9th/16th place Tournament ===
No Classification match was held for the clubs eliminated in the Round of 16 with Catania FC (Italy) and Dalian (China) chosen as the 9th and 10th best clubs of the tournament

=== 17th/24th place Finals ===
- 17th/18th place final: Canada BSC vs FC Genappe 6–4
- 19th/20th place final: Newteam Brussels vs Calibi BSC 5–9
- 21st/22nd place final: Bologna BSC vs Naxos BS 5–2
- 23rd/24th place final: CB Viseu vs BS Vion 4–5

== Awards and Statistics ==
=== Individual Awards ===
Top scorer

(Brazil) Alison (Pafos FC)
14 goals in 7 games

Best Player
(Brazil) Lucão (Napoli BS)
Best Goalkeeper
Sebastiano Paterniti Barbino
(Italy) (Napoli BS)

=== Final standings ===
Pos	Team	Result
1	(Italy) Napoli BS	2023 WWC Champions (1st title)
2	(Latvia) Riga FC	Runners-up
3	(Cyprus) Pafos BSC	Third place
4	(Spain) Bahia de Mazarron	
5	(Germany) Real Munstler	
6	(El Salvador) Barra de Santiago	
7	(Ukraine) BSC Artur Music	
8	(Spain) Recreativo Huelva	
9	(Italy) Catania FC	
10	(China) Dalian BST	

== See also ==
- Euro Winners Cup
- Euro Winners Challenge
- Mundialito de Clubes
- Women's Euro Winners Cup
- Copa Libertadores de Fútbol Playa
- FIFA Beach Soccer World Cup
- Euro Beach Soccer League
- Beach Soccer Stars
