= Catania Beach Soccer =

Beach football club in Sicily, Italy

- Full name: ASD Catania Beach Soccer
- Nickname: Etnei
- Founded: 2004
- Ground: Domusbet Arena Beach Soccer (2000 people)
- Chairman: Raffaele Moxedano
- Coach: (Italy) Giuseppe Bosco
- League: Serie A LND
Home colours	Away colours

The ASD Catania Beach Soccer is a professional beach soccer team based in Catania. It is the most winning club of Italy with 17 national titles and the 2025 Euro Winners Cup. The sicilian club reached three European podiums and the 2019 Mundialito de Clubes final.

== Honours ==
=== International competitions ===
Euro Winners Cup

- Champions: 2025 6–1 against Kfar Qassem
- Runners-up: 2015 (2–6 against BSC Kristall)
- Fourth-place: 2016

Mundialito de Clubes

- Runners-up: 2019 (6–7 against Braga)

=== National competitions ===
Serie A

- Champions 2008, 2018 and 2024
- Runners-up: 2017, 2023 and 2025

Coppa Italia

- Champions 2004, 2005, 2018, 2019, 2021 and 2023
- Runners-up: 2006, 2011, 2012, 2013, 2014, 2015, 2022 and 2024

Supercoppa Italiana

- Champions: 2006, 2007, 2009, 2016, 2021, 2022, 2024 and 2025
- Runners-up: 2005, 2012, 2019 and 2023

== See also ==
- Serie A Beach Soccer
- Coppa Italia Beach Soccer
- Supercoppa Italiana Beach Soccer
- Euro Winners Cup
- World Winners Cup
- Milano Beach Soccer
- Napoli Beach Soccer
