= 2009 Italian Beach Soccer League =

Association football competition

Campionato Italiano di Beach Soccer

Tournament details
- City: Terracina (Lazio)
- Dates: June 18, 2009; August 16, 2009
- Teams: 21

Final positions
- Champions: Napoli BS (1st title)
- Runners-up: Milano BS
- Third place: Terracina BS
- Fourth place: Cavalieri M. BS

Tournament statistics
- Top scorer(s): (Portugal) Madjer 45 goals (Cavalieri Mare BS)
- Best player(s): (Italy) Alessandro Tiberi; 22 goals (Napoli BS)

The 2009 Italian Beach Soccer League was the 6th season of the Italian beach soccer league, the first edition with 21 clubs in Serie A and the only one that ended with the Scudetto win for Napoli BS.

== Serie A ==
=== Poule Scudetto ===
Final Eight

Quarter-finals
Milano BS	8
Media Eboli	6
Cavalieri Mare BS	7
Catania BS	6
Cervia BS	2
Terracina BS	9
Lignano Sab BS	3
Napoli BS	6

Semi-finals
Milano BS	5
Cavalieri Mare BS	2
Terracina BS	3
Napoli BS	4

2009 Serie A Final
Milano BS	5
Napoli BS	6
Third place
Cavalieri Mare BS	5
Terracina BS	6

Consolation tournament

5th/8th place Playoff
Media Eboli	6
Catania BS	5
Cervia BS	4
Lignano Sab BS	3

5th/6th place final
Media Eboli	1
Cervia BS	4
7th/8th place Final
Catania BS	8
Lignano Sab BS	10

=== Awards ===
Award	Player	Club
MVP	(Italy) Alessandro Tiberi	Napoli BS
Topscorer	(Portugal) Madjer	Cavalieri del Mare
Best Goalkeeper	(Argentina) Salguero	Napoli BS
Fair Play	(Italy) Fabio Panizza	Milano BS

=== Topscorers ===
Rank	Player	Club	Goals
1	Madjer	Cavalieri del Mare	45
2	Belchior	Cavalieri del Mare	30
3	Ddì; Juninho	Cervia BS	26
4	Tiberi	Napoli BS	22
5	J. Torres; Benjamin; Palmacci	Mare di Roma; Milano BS; Terracina BS	17

== 2009 Serie A Final ==
16 August 2009
20:30 CEST

Milano BS	5-6	Napoli BS
Amarelle 5', 21'; Benjamin 8', 29'; Casara 18'; Biasini 20'	Report	Tiberi 19', 26', 29', 30'; Diego Maradona Jr. 21'; Hilaire 22'

Agos Beach Stadium, Ostia, Lazio (Italy)
Attendance: ???
Referee:
Castaldi (Termoli)
Crispino (Catanzaro)
Polito (Aprilia)
Valgiusti (Forlì)

Milano Beach Soccer	Napoli Beach Soccer

=== Finalist team ===
Milano BS
Players: Rasulo, Casarsa, Bruno Mendes, Nico, Biasini, Ahmed, Amarelle, Ghilardi, Benjamin, Zanini
Manager: Panizza.

Napoli BS
Players: Salguero, D’Auria, Di Maio, Franceschini, Esposito, Palma, Lopez Hilaire, Maradona jr., Tiberi, Capuano
Manager: Amorosetti

== Coppa Italia ==
=== Final Rounds ===
- 3rd place final: Catania Beach Soccer vs Lignano Sabbiadoro: 3-2
- 5th place final: Mare di Roma vs Terracina: 1-9
- 7th place final: Club Catania vs Cervia BS: 2-12
- 9th place finale: Panarea Ecosistem vs Bari BS: 8-4
- 11th place final: Friulpesca Lignano vs Aci Castello Beach Soccer: 6–7
- 13th place final: Napoli Beach Soccer vs Sambenedettese BS: 6–4
- 15th place final: Riviera Spineta BS vs Casinò di Venezia: 9 – 1

=== 2009 Coppa Italia Final ===
31 May 2009
CEST

Milano BS	9-9	Cavalieri del Mare BS
Nico 3'; Amarelle 8', 23'; Benjamin 8', 34'; Bruno 13', 14', 34'; Biasini 20'	Report	Madjer 5', 25'; Alan 16', 20', 23'; Belchior 23', 31', 33'; Carotenuto 25'
Penalties
Amarelle (penalty scored)	1-0	(penalty missed) Madjer

Agos Beach Stadium, Terracina, Lazio
Attendance: ???
Referee:
Bonavita (Forlì)
Cascone (Ragusa)

Milano Beach Soccer	Beach Soccer Cavalieri del Mare

== Supercoppa Italiana ==
13 August 2009
CEST

Lignano BS	0-1	Catania BS
	Report	Stankovic 14'

Ostia, Lazio
Attendance: ???
Referee:
Caruso (Lanciano)
Pungitore (Reggio Calabria)

Lignano Sabbiadoro BS	Catania Beach Soccer

== See also ==
- Italian Beach Soccer League
- Coppa Italia di beach soccer
- Supercoppa italiana (beach soccer)
- Milano Beach Soccer
- Napoli Beach Soccer
- Catania Beach Soccer
