= Plages du Prado =

Beaches in the south neighborhood of Marseille, France

Coordinates: 43°15′20″N 5°22′30″E

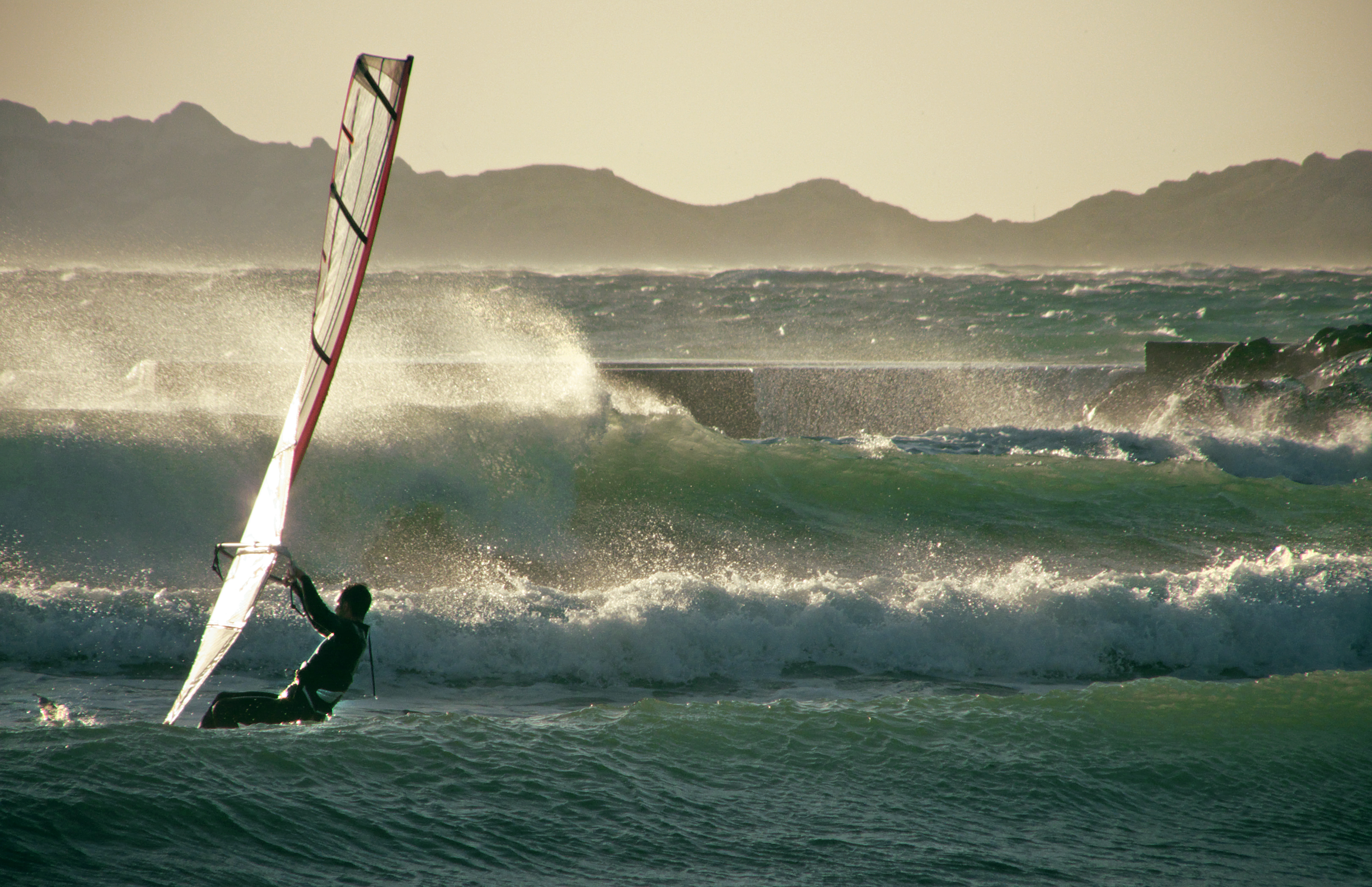
Windsurf at the Plages du Prado

The Plages du Prado (or Plage du Prado—translated variously as Prado Beach, Prado beach, Prado Beaches, and Prado beaches) are the beaches in the south neighborhood of Marseille, France. The seaside park is an artificial coastal development created in the late 1970s by Gaston Defferre. They were built with the fill coming from the construction of the two Marseille metro lines.

== Overview ==
They host many events including the Sosh Freestyle Cup, particular due to the presence of the Bowl of Marseille, famous skatepark. In June each year they host concerts during the World Music Day.

Plages du Prado was the venue for the 2008 FIFA Beach Soccer World Cup. For the occasion, the summer stadium's capacity was increased to 8500 seats, against 4500. normally. Over the course of the tournament, it hosted 16 teams competing for the crown of World Champions. All group matches and knockout matches were played there. It was the first time that the competition had been held outside Brazil.

On 14 April 2012, the Left Front presidential candidate Jean-Luc Mélenchon organised a rally on the Plage du Prado. According to the organisers, 120,000 people were present.

== See also ==
- 2008 FIFA Beach Soccer World Cup
- 2008 FIFA Beach Soccer World Cup Final
