= Italian Beach Soccer League =

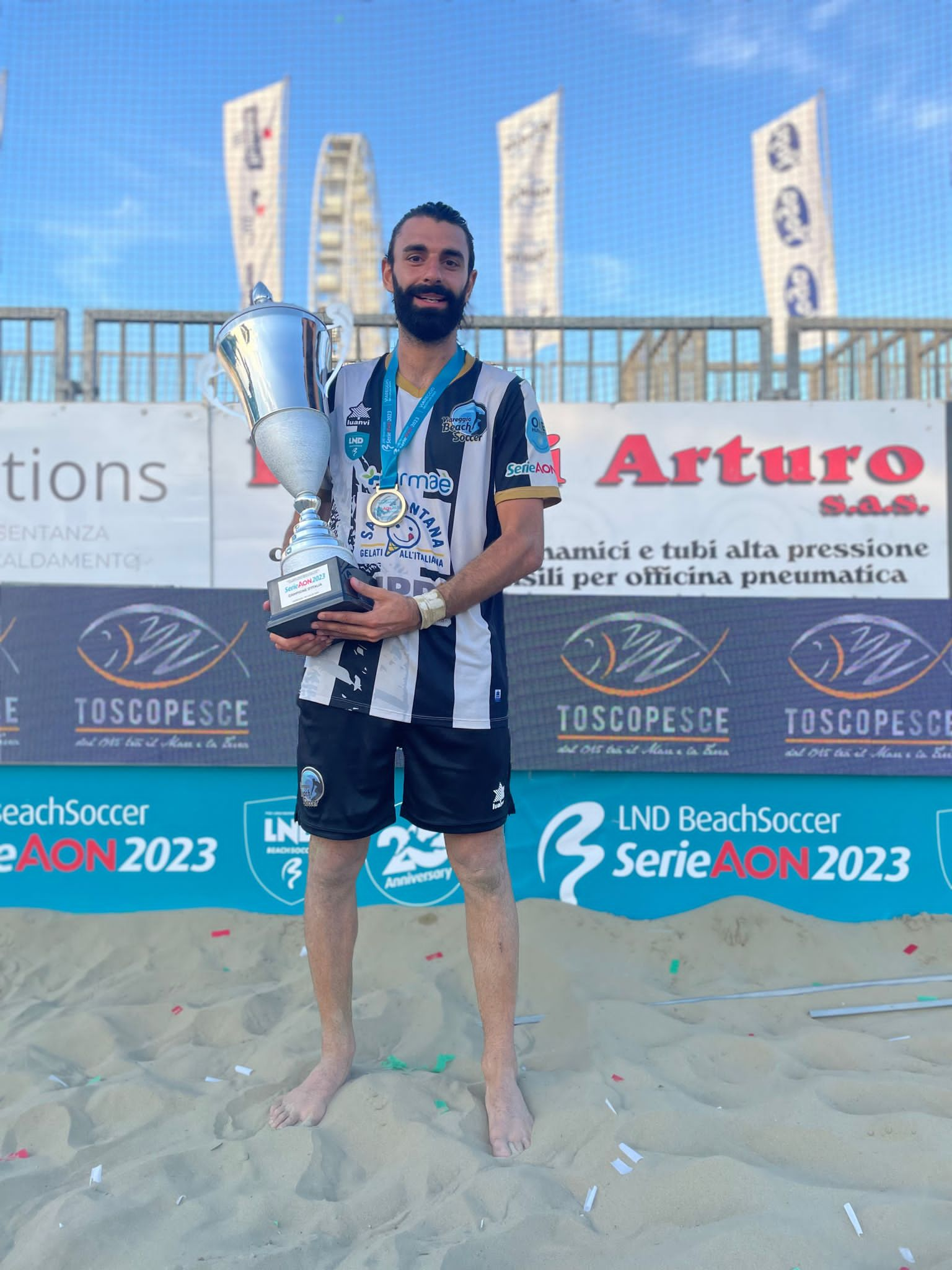
- Gianmarco Genovali, one of the 2016 Viareggio treble winners
- Organiser(s): LND
- Founded: 2004
- Region: Italy
- Teams: 26 (20 Serie A)
- Related competitions: (Italy) Coppa Italia (Italy) Supercoppa Italiana (Europe) Euro Winners Cup (United Nations) World Winners Cup
- Current champions: Pisa BS (4 titles)
- Most championships: Milano BS (4 Serie A); Pisa BS; Catania BS (17 titles)
- Website: LND - Dipartimento Beach Soccer

The Campionato Italiano di Beach Soccer is the Italian beach soccer league organized since 2004 by the LND - Dipartimento Beach Soccer. The championship is split into two divisions: the Serie A with 20 clubs in two different Poules and a small Serie B tournament. Each edition is divided in two phases, with small tour around Italian coastal cities that qualify the best eight clubs to the final Playoff tournament.

== Serie A and Coppa Italia Champions ==
The Serie A of Beach Soccer is very similar to the EBSL: the 10 clubs of Scudetto Poule and the 10 clubs of Salvezza Poule play three match each in three different Italian coastal municipalities. The regular season ends after every club match one against every opponente in its Poule.

Then, the top seven of first Poule and the winner of the secondary one compete in the Scudetto Playoff, a three-rounds single-elimination tournament to win the Italian championship. The clubs that placed 2nd-4th in the secondary Poule and the bottom-last in the main one compete in a round-robin Promotion Playoff where the winner is promoted in the main Poule (along with the winner of the Salvezza Poule).

The Serie A winner along the best placed clubs qualify to the following Euro Winners Cup.

=== Champions ===
| Season | Serie A Winners | Final | Serie A Runner-up | Coppa Italia Winners | Supercoppa ITA |
|---|---|---|---|---|---|
| 2004 | Cavalieri del Mare | 1-0 (eat) | Friulpesca Marano Lagunare | Catania BS | Catanzaro BS |
| 2005 | Cavalieri del Mare (2) | 10-4 | Lignano Sabbiadoro BS | Catania BS (2) | Cavalieri del Mare |
| 2006 | Milano Beach Soccer | 7-2 | Friulpesca Udine | Milano Beach Soccer | Catania BS |
| 2007 | Milano Beach Soccer (2) | 3-3 (3-2 po) | Coil Lignano Sabbiadoro | Milano Beach Soccer (2) | Catania BS (2) |
| 2008 | Catania BS | 4-4 (3-2 po) | Terracina BS | Lignano Sabbiadoro BS | Cavalieri del Mare (2) |
| 2009 | Napoli Beach Soccer | 6-5 | Milano Beach Soccer | Milano Beach Soccer (3) | Catania BS (3) |
| 2010 | Milano Beach Soccer (3) | 6-5 (eat) | Catanzaro BS | Milano Beach Soccer (4) | Milano Beach Soccer |
| 2011 | Terracina BS | 6-4 | Colosseum | Terracina BS | Terracina BS |
| 2012 | Terracina BS (2) | 7-4 | Viareggio Beach Soccer | Viareggio Beach Soccer | Terracina BS (2) |
| 2013 | Milano Beach Soccer (4) | 4-3 | Terracina BS | Sambenedettese Beach Soccer | Terracina BS (3) |
| 2014 | Sambenedettese Beach Soccer | 4-3 | Milano Beach Soccer | Terracina BS (2) | Sambenedettese Beach Soccer |
| 2015 | Terracina BS | 7-4 | Viareggio Beach Soccer | Terracina BS (3) | Sambenedettese Beach Soccer (2) |
| 2016 | Viareggio Beach Soccer | 7-6 | Lazio | Viareggio Beach Soccer (2) | Catania BS (4) |
| 2017 | Sambenedettese Beach Soccer (2) | 8-7 (eat) | Catania BS | Sambenedettese Beach Soccer (2) | Sambenedettese Beach Soccer (3) |
| 2018 | Catania BS (2) | 7-4 | Sambenedettese Beach Soccer | Catania BS (3) | Viareggio Beach Soccer |
| 2019 | Sambenedettese Beach Soccer (3) | 6-5 | Viareggio Beach Soccer | Catania BS (4) | Terracina BS (4) |
| 2021 | Pisa Beach Soccer | 5-3 | Terracina BS | Catania BS (5) | Catania BS (5) |
| 2022 | Pisa Beach Soccer (2) | 3-2 | Viareggio Beach Soccer | Pisa Beach Soccer | Catania BS (6) |
| 2023 | Viareggio Beach Soccer (2) | 9-2 | Catania BS | Catania BS (6) | Pisa Beach Soccer |
| 2024 | Catania BS (3) | 4-3 | Pisa Beach Soccer | Catania FC | Catania BS (7) |
| 2025 | Pisa Beach Soccer (3) | 2-1 | Catania BS | Napoli Beach Soccer | Catania BS (8) |
| 2026 | Pisa Beach Soccer (4) | 7-4 | Sambenedettese Beach Soccer | Sambenedettese Beach Soccer (3) | Napoli Beach Soccer |

=== Scudetto, Coppa Italia and Supercoppa winners ===
| Club | | Champions | Runners-up | Tot. | | SCI | Tot. |
|---|---|---|---|---|---|---|---|
| Milano BS | 4 | 2006, 2007, 2010, 2013 | 2009, 2014 | 6 | 4 | 1 | 9 |
| Pisa BS | 4 | 2021, 2022, 2025, 2026 | 2024 | 5 | 1 | 1 | 6 |
| Catania BS | 3 | 2008, 2018, 2024 | 2017, 2023, 2025 | 6 | 6 | 8 | 17 |
| Terracina BS | 3 | 2011, 2012, 2015 | 2008, 2013, 2021 | 6 | 3 | 4 | 10 |
| Sambenedettese BS | 3 | 2014, 2017, 2019 | 2018, 2026 | 5 | 3 | 3 | 9 |
| Viareggio BS | 2 | 2016, 2023 | 2012, 2015, 2019, 2022 | 6 | 2 | 1 | 5 |
| Cavalieri del Mare BS | 2 | 2004, 2005 | | 2 | 0 | 2 | 4 |
| Napoli BS | 1 | 2009 | | 1 | 1 | 1 | 3 |
| Lignano Sabbiadoro BS | 0 | | 2005, 2007 | 2 | 1 | 0 | 1 |
| Lazio BS | 0 | | 2016 | 1 | 0 | 0 | 0 |
| Colosseum | 0 | | 2011 | 1 | 0 | 0 | 0 |
| Catanzaro BS | 0 | | 2010 | 1 | 0 | 1 | 1 |
| Friulpesca Udine | 0 | | 2006 | 1 | 0 | 0 | 0 |
| Catania FC | 0 | | | 0 | 1 | 0 | 1 |
| Bibione | 0 | | | 0 | RU | 0 | 0 |
| Salerno | 0 | | | 0 | 0 | RU | 0 |

== Serie B Champions ==
The first Serie B Championship was contested in 2015 by just 4 regional selections in Viareggio and was won by "Amici dello Sport" Terracina with 4–2 against Napoli Dream Team, 3–1 against Virtus Ottaviano and 4-5 aet defeat against Capo di Leuca. With a last game win against Ottaviano (7–4), the neapolitan club completed the 3 matches league with the same amount of points of Terracina (6 each) and got the promotion to Serie A. Capo di Leuca got the third position with a 5-3 aet win against Ottaviano in the first match. In the following years, the Championship was split into two groups or not held at all.

| Season | Serie B Winners |
|---|---|
| 2015 | Amici dello Sport Terracina; Napoli Dream Team |
| 2016 | Amici dello Sport Terracina (2); Unione Bragno |
| 2017 | Unione Bragno (2); Palazzolo |
| 2018 | Genova |
| 2023 | Brancaleone |
| 2024 | Sakro Crotone |

The 2025 Serie B of Beach Soccer was held in Crotone from 3 to 6 August 2025. Gladiators Viareggio won his group with 4–3 win against Centro Storico and a 5-6 (aet) defeat against Amantea while Massimo Palanca won both matches against Givova Città di Agropoli (5–2) and Tirrena Lazio (9–1). In the final of Cirò Marina, Gladiators Viareggio won the title with a 4–2 win against the undefeated Massimo Palanca team.

| Season | Serie B Winners | Final | Serie B Runners-up | Clubs |
|---|---|---|---|---|
| 2025 | Gladiators Viareggio | 4-2 | Massimo Palanca | 6 |
| 2026 | Como Beach Soccer | 5-2 | Mare di Roma | 7 |

== Under 20 Championship ==
| Season | U-20 Winners | Final | U-20 Runner-up | U-20 Coppa Italia | U-20 Supercup |
|---|---|---|---|---|---|
| 2021 | Viareggio BS (1) | 5–3 | Lazio BS | | |
| 2022 | Viareggio BS (2) | 3–2 | Cagliari BS | | |
| 2023 | Viareggio BS (3) | 2–1 | Lamezia BS | Viareggio BS | |
| 2024 | Lazio BS | 4–1 | Lamezia BS | Lamezia BS | |
| 2025 | Napoli BS | 2–1 | Lazio BS | Viareggio BS (2) | Lazio BS |
| 2026 | Viareggio BS (4) | 3-3 (7-5) | Lamezia BS | Lenergy Pisa | Viareggio BS |

== Women Serie A Beach Soccer ==
| Club | | Years | RU | | SCI | Tot. |
|---|---|---|---|---|---|---|
| Lady Terracina | 5 | 2015, 2016, 2017, 2018, 2023 | 3 | 2 | 1 | 8 |
| Cagliari BSF | 2 | 2024, 2025 | 1 | 2 | 2 | 6 |
| Sambenedettese | 2 | 2019, 2021 | 0 | 0 | 0 | 2 |
| Futsal Basic Academy | 1 | 2022 | 0 | 1 | 0 | 2 |
| Chiasiellis | 1 | 2007 | 0 | 0 | 0 | 1 |
| Firenze | 1 | 2010 | 0 | 0 | 0 | 1 |
| Mestre | 1 | 2013 | 0 | 0 | 0 | 1 |
| Catanzaro | 1 | 2014 | 1 | 0 | 0 | 1 |
| VJS Velletri | 1 | 2026 | 0 | 0 | 0 | 1 |
| Genova Beach Soccer | 0 | No title | 0 | 1 | 0 | 1 |

== See also ==
- Coppa Italia (beach soccer)
- Supercoppa Italiana
- Women Serie A Beach Soccer
- Under-20 Serie A Beach Soccer
- Lega Nazionale Dilettanti
- Italy national beach soccer team
- Serie A (football)
- Serie A1 (futsal)
