= 2008 FIFA Beach Soccer World Cup =

Coupe du monde de football de plage 2008

Tournament details
- Host country: France
- City: Marseille
- Dates: 17–27 July
- Teams: 16 (from 6 confederations)
- Venue: 1 (in 1 host city)

Final positions
- Champions: Brazil (3rd title)
- Runners-up: Italy
- Third place: Portugal
- Fourth place: Spain

Tournament statistics
- Matches played: 32
- Goals scored: 259 (8.09 per match)
- Attendance: 176,500 (5,516 per match)
- Top scorer: (Portugal) Madjer (13 goals)
- Best player: (Spain) Amarelle
- Best goalkeeper: (Spain) Roberto Valeiro
- Fair play award: Russia

The 2008 FIFA Beach Soccer World Cup was the fourth edition of the FIFA Beach Soccer World Cup, governed by FIFA. Overall, this was the 14th edition of a world cup in beach soccer since the establishment of the Beach Soccer World Championships which ran from 1995–2004 but was not governed by FIFA. It took place in Marseille, France, in the Plages du Prado from 17 to 27 July 2008. It was the first tournament to take place outside Brazil.

The winners of the tournament were Brazil, who won their third consecutive FIFA Beach Soccer World Cup title and their twelfth title overall.

== Qualifying rounds ==
=== Africa ===
The qualifiers to determine the two African nations who would play in the World Cup took place in Durban, South Africa for the third year running between March 25 and March 30. Eight nations took part in the competition, all of whom participated in the 2007 Championship, which eventually saw Senegal claim their first title, qualifying for the second successive World Cup and which saw Cameroon finish in second place, also qualifying for the second time.

=== Asia ===
The Asian qualifiers took place in Dubai, United Arab Emirates, for the third time, between May 6 and May 10. The hosts, the United Arab Emirates qualified for the second time after beating Japan in the final of the championship, 4-3, for the second consecutive year. Iran beat China in the third place play off to claim the third berth at the World Cup for the third year in a row.

=== Europe ===
For the first time since the FIFA Beach Soccer World Cup qualifiers began in 2006, due to the large interest of European nations in beach soccer, UEFA held a tournament dedicated to World Cup qualification in Benidorm, Spain, between, May 11 and May 18, instead of allowing European nations to qualify to the World Cup through the Euro Beach Soccer League. Hosts Spain won the championship, with neighbours Portugal finishing second. Russia beat Italy in the third place play off, but regardless of the result, both teams qualified to the World Cup, along with the finalists.

=== North, Central American and Caribbean Zone ===
The North, Central America and the Caribbean Zone qualifiers took place between April 17 and April 19 in Puerto Vallarta, Mexico. Mexico and El Salvador were the two finalists, meaning they both qualified for the World Cup; Mexico for the second time and El Salvador for the first. Mexico defeated El Salvador in the final to win their first title.

=== South America ===
The South American qualifiers took place between April 23 and April 27, in the Argentinean capital, Buenos Aires. Brazil and hosts Argentina were the two finalists, meaning they both qualified for the World Cup. Brazil defeated Argentina in the final to win the title. Uruguay and Venezuela were knocked out in the semi-finals and played each other in the third place play off. Uruguay beat Venezuela to claim the third berth at the World Cup.

=== Oceania ===
For the first and to date only time, no Oceanian qualifiers were held. The Oceania Football Confederation nominated the Solomon Islands as their representative in the World Cup, based on their results over the past two years, which showed that they were by far the strongest team in the confederation.

=== Hosts ===
France qualified automatically as the hosts.

== Teams ==
These are the teams that qualified to the World Cup:

Asian zone:

- Iran
- Japan
- United Arab Emirates

African zone:

- Cameroon
- Senegal

European zone:

- France (hosts)
- Italy
- Portugal
- Russia
- Spain

North, Central American and Caribbean zone:

- El Salvador (First Appearance)
- Mexico

Oceanian zone:

- Solomon Islands

South American zone:

- Argentina
- Brazil
- Uruguay

== Venue ==
A stadium on the Plage du Prado in southern Marseille was used known as the Stade du Prado or the Stadium of the Beach in English. The stadium hosted all 32 matches.

| Marseille | Marseille (France) |
|---|---|
| Stade du Prado | Marseille (France) |
| 43°15′N 5°22′E | Marseille (France) |
| Capacity: 7,000 | Marseille (France) |

== Group stage ==
The 16 teams present at the finals in France were split into 4 groups of 4 teams. Each team played the other 3 teams in its group in a round-robin format, with the top two teams advancing to the quarter finals. The quarter finals, semi finals and the final itself was played in the form of a knockout tournament.

All matches are listed as local time (UTC+1)

=== Group A ===
| Team | Pld | W | W+ | L | GF | GA | GD | Pts |
|---|---|---|---|---|---|---|---|---|
| France | 3 | 1 | 1 | 1 | 15 | 14 | +1 | 5 |
| Uruguay | 3 | 1 | 1 | 1 | 17 | 12 | +5 | 5 |
| Senegal | 3 | 1 | 1 | 1 | 16 | 14 | +2 | 5 |
| Iran | 3 | 0 | 0 | 3 | 8 | 16 | −8 | 0 |

- Note: France, Uruguay and Senegal were involved in a tie-break situation and therefore their matches against Iran were ignored and the nations were ranked by their goal difference in the matches against each other. Despite France having the worst overall goal difference, they had the best goal difference between the three teams involved in the tie-break and therefore finished in first place. Uruguay, with an equal number of goals scored and conceded, against France and Senegal finished second, and Senegal with a negative goal difference of -1, finished third.
17 July 2008
16:15

| Uruguay | 6–1 | Iran |
|---|---|---|
| Ricar 2', 7', 21'; Martinez 5'; Parrillo 27'; Fabian 30' | Report | 19' Davoudi |

Stade du Prado
Referee: (Spain) Juan José Lopez Lopez

17 July 2008
19:15

| France | 5–5 (a.e.t.) (1–2 Pens) | Senegal |
|---|---|---|
| Samoun 15', 35'; Basquaise 20'; François 27'; Pérez 32' | Report | 1', 31' Koukpaki; 11' Mbengue; 12' Dieng; 16' Sylla |
Penalties
| Basquaise (penalty scored); François (penalty missed) | 1–2 | (penalty scored) Mbengue; (penalty scored) Ndour |

Stade du Prado
Referee: (Hungary) Istvan Meszaros

19 July 2008
14:45

| Senegal | 7–8 (a.e.t.) | Uruguay |
|---|---|---|
| Koukpaki 14', 15', 26', 38'; Sarr 19'; Mbengue 29'; Diagne 30' | Report | 3', 28' Martin; 11' Parrillo; 22' Miguel; 26' Ricar; 35', 37' Matias; 37' Pampero |

Stade du Prado
Attendance: 4 000
Referee: (Latvia) Eduards Borisevics

19 July 2008
19:15

| Iran | 6–6 (a.e.t.) (1–2 Pens) | France |
|---|---|---|
| Naderi 6', 36'; Abdollahi 18'; Mesigar 22', 24'; Davoudi 31' | Report | 9' (o.g.) Rahimi; 10', 11', 13', 37' Basquaise; 13' Ottavy |
Penalties
| Dara (penalty scored); Davoudi (penalty missed) | 1–2 | (penalty scored) François; (penalty scored) Pérez |

Stade du Prado
Attendance: 7 000
Referee: (Netherlands) George Postma

21 July 2008
17:45

| Senegal | 4–1 | Iran |
|---|---|---|
| Mbengue 8'; Koukpaki 18', 33'; Diagne 23' | Report | 25' Naderi |

Stade du Prado
Attendance: 7 000
Referee: (Brazil) Alberto Moreira

21 July 2008
17:45

| France | 4–3 | Uruguay |
|---|---|---|
| Samoun 8', 10'; Basquaise 19', 27' | Report | 26' Ricar; 33' Parrillo; 35' Oli |

Stade du Prado
Attendance: 7 000
Referee: (Costa Rica) Erick Chavarria

=== Group B ===
| Team | Pld | W | W+ | L | GF | GA | GD | Pts |
|---|---|---|---|---|---|---|---|---|
| Portugal | 3 | 2 | 1 | 0 | 26 | 10 | +16 | 8 |
| Italy | 3 | 2 | 0 | 1 | 15 | 10 | +5 | 6 |
| Solomon Islands | 3 | 1 | 0 | 2 | 14 | 23 | −9 | 3 |
| El Salvador | 3 | 0 | 0 | 3 | 6 | 18 | −12 | 0 |

17 July 2008
14:45

| Italy | 7–4 | Solomon Islands |
|---|---|---|
| Palmacci 1'; Feudi 2'; Corosiniti 7', 24'; Soria 11'; Pasquali 16'; Condorelli 16' | Report | 2' Naka; 14', 16' Hosea; 23' Muri |

Stade du Prado
Referee: (Uruguay) Carlos Aguirregaray

17 July 2008
17:45

| Portugal | 8–2 | El Salvador |
|---|---|---|
| Alan 1'; Madjer 13', 17'; Hernani 14'; Sousa 15'; Torres 21'; Belchior 32', 35' | Report | 6' Ruiz; 6' Blanco |

Stade du Prado
Referee: (Japan) Tasuku Onodera

19 July 2008
16:15

| Solomon Islands | 4–13 | Portugal |
|---|---|---|
| Naka 13', 16', 27'; Nee 31' | Report | 2', 15', 16', 17', 24' Madjer; 4', 4', 16', 29' Alan; 4' (o.g.) Omokirio; 7', 23', 33' Belchior |

Stade du Prado
Attendance: 5 200
Referee: (United Arab Emirates) Faisal Sallam

19 July 2008
17:45

| El Salvador | 1–4 | Italy |
|---|---|---|
| Hernández 26' | Report | 5' Pasquali; 17', 20' Palmacci; 24' Feudi |

Stade du Prado
Attendance: 6 000
Referee: (Brazil) Alberto Moreira

21 July 2008
14:45

| Portugal | 5–4 (a.e.t.) | Italy |
|---|---|---|
| Belchior 6', 9', 38'; Alan 8'; Madjer 32' | Report | 18' Esposito; 22' Diego Maradona Jr; 24' Soria; 28' Platania |

Stade du Prado
Attendance: 5 000
Referee: (Spain) Juan José Lopez Lopez

21 July 2008
16:15

| El Salvador | 3–6 | Solomon Islands |
|---|---|---|
| Ruiz 13'; Ramírez 24'; Hernández 28' | Report | 5', 13', 16', 23' Naka; 28', 35' Omo |

Stade du Prado
Attendance: 3 800
Referee: (China) Zhiwei Geng

=== Group C ===
| Team | Pld | W | W+ | L | GF | GA | GD | Pts |
|---|---|---|---|---|---|---|---|---|
| Argentina | 3 | 3 | 0 | 0 | 13 | 5 | +8 | 9 |
| Russia | 3 | 2 | 0 | 1 | 12 | 5 | +7 | 6 |
| United Arab Emirates | 3 | 1 | 0 | 2 | 12 | 14 | −2 | 3 |
| Cameroon | 3 | 0 | 0 | 3 | 4 | 17 | −13 | 0 |

18 July 2008
14:45

| Russia | 3–5 | Argentina |
|---|---|---|
| Leonov 7'; Shaykov 26'; Shishin 27' | Report | 12' E.Hilaire; 16', 30', 35' F.Hilaire; 28' Minici |

Stade du Prado
Attendance: 4 000
Referee: (Netherlands) George Postma

18 July 2008
14:45

| United Arab Emirates | 10–4 | Cameroon |
|---|---|---|
| Alabadla 1', 17', 19'; Almazam 18'; Eyoum 19' (o.g.); Al Mesaabi 27', 32'; K.Albalooshi 27'; Albloushi 28'; I.Albalooshi 28' | Report | 1' Yombi; 8', 18' Etame; 20' Yopa |

Stade du Prado
Attendance: 4 500
Referee: (Costa Rica) Erick Chavarria

20 July 2008
16:15

| Argentina | 5–2 | United Arab Emirates |
|---|---|---|
| S.Hilaire 5'; Leguizamon 20', 33'; F.Hilaire 18', 29' | Report | 10' Al Mesaabi; 33' I.Albalooshi |

Stade du Prado
Attendance: 4 500
Referee: (France) Sylvain Palhies

20 July 2008
17:45

| Cameroon | 0–4 | Russia |
|---|---|---|
| | Report | 8' (o.g.) Yombi; 11' Khmara; 20' Makarov; 35' Shakmelyan |

Stade du Prado
Attendance: 5 300
Referee: (Italy) Fabio Polito

22 July 2008
14:45

| United Arab Emirates | 0–5 | Russia |
|---|---|---|
| | Report | 6' Makarov; 6', 26' Shaykov; 23' Shishin; 27' Gorchinskiy |

Stade du Prado
Attendance: 3 000
Referee: (Hungary) Istvan Meszaros

22 July 2008
16:15

| Cameroon | 0–3 | Argentina |
|---|---|---|
| | Report | 1', 2', 34' Minici |

Stade du Prado
Attendance: 3 800
Referee: (Japan) Tasuku Onodera

=== Group D ===
| Team | Pld | W | W+ | L | GF | GA | GD | Pts |
|---|---|---|---|---|---|---|---|---|
| Brazil | 3 | 3 | 0 | 0 | 18 | 4 | +14 | 9 |
| Spain | 3 | 2 | 0 | 1 | 10 | 5 | +5 | 6 |
| Mexico | 3 | 1 | 0 | 2 | 6 | 12 | −6 | 3 |
| Japan | 3 | 0 | 0 | 3 | 5 | 18 | −13 | 0 |

18 July 2008
16:15

| Mexico | 4–3 | Japan |
|---|---|---|
| Santoyo 24'; Villalobos 24', 30'; Flores 28' | Report | 1' Yoshii; 24' Tabata; 26' Uehara |

Stade du Prado
Attendance: 4 000
Referee: (Egypt) Mohamed Morsi

18 July 2008
19:15

| Brazil | 3–2 | Spain |
|---|---|---|
| Buru 1', 30'; Bruno 21' | Report | 1', 5' Amarelle |

Stade du Prado
Attendance: 6 500
Referee: (Italy) Fabio Polito

20 July 2008
14:45

| Spain | 2–1 | Mexico |
|---|---|---|
| Amarelle 14'; Antonio 25' | Report | 3' Flores |

Stade du Prado
Attendance: 4 000
Referee: (Lithuania) Sergejus Slyva

20 July 2008
19:15

| Japan | 1–8 | Brazil |
|---|---|---|
| Makino 23' | Report | 4', 17' Júnior Negrão; 12' Buru; 15' Betinho; 16' Benjamin; 23' Bruno; 31' Daniel; 34' (o.g.) Yoshii |

Stade du Prado
Attendance: 7 000
Referee: (Costa Rica) Erick Chavarria

22 July 2008
17:45

| Spain | 6–1 | Japan |
|---|---|---|
| Amarelle 15', 19', 26'; C.Torres 15'; Nico 20'; Alvarez 33' | Report | 16' Uehara |

Stade du Prado
Attendance: 5 000
Referee: (Uruguay) Carlos Aguirregaray

22 July 2008
16:15

| Brazil | 7–1 | Mexico |
|---|---|---|
| Benjamin 1', 19', 33'; Andre 7'; Bruno 23'; Bueno 29'; Betinho 32' | Report | 20' Alvarado |

Stade du Prado
Attendance: 6 000
Referee: (Netherlands) George Postma

== Knockout stage ==
Quarter-finals
24 July 2008
France | 2
Italy | 5
24 July 2008
Argentina | 0
Spain | 2
24 July 2008
Portugal | 6
Uruguay | 3
24 July 2008
Brazil | 6
Russia | 4

Semi-finals
26 July 2008
Italy (pens) | 4 (1)
Spain | 4 (0)
26 July 2008
Portugal | 4
Brazil | 5

Final
27 July 2008
Italy | 3
Brazil | 5
Third place
27 July 2008
Spain | 4
Portugal | 5

=== Quarter finals ===
24 July 2008
19:15

| France | 2–5 | Italy |
|---|---|---|
| Samoun 22'; François 32' | Report | 1' Esposito; 1', 10' Feudi; 22' Condorelli; 22' Palmacci |

Stade du Prado
Attendance: 7 000
Referee: (Brazil) Alberto Moreira

24 July 2008
14:45

| Portugal | 6–3 | Uruguay |
|---|---|---|
| Belchior 7', 29'; Sousa 10'; Madjer 14'; Bilro 25'; Coco 28' (o.g.) | Report | 14', 31' Fabian; 23' Martin |

Stade du Prado
Attendance: 6 000
Referee: (Spain) Juan José Lopez Lopez

24 July 2008
16:15

| Argentina | 0–2 | Spain |
|---|---|---|
| | Report | 1', 33' Nico |

Stade du Prado
Attendance: 6 500
Referee: (Hungary) Istvan Meszaros

24 July 2008
17:45

| Brazil | 6–4 | Russia |
|---|---|---|
| Buru 4', 10'; Daniel 18', 27', 29'; Benjamin 33' | Report | 3', 30' Shaykov; 4' Shishin; 17' Leonov |

Stade du Prado
Attendance: 7 000
Referee: (France) Sylvain Palhies

=== Semi finals ===
26 July 2008
19:00

| Italy | 4–4 (a.e.t.) (1–0 Pens) | Spain |
|---|---|---|
| Esposito 4'; Feudi 5'; Pasquali 24', 34' | Report | 2', 34' Amarelle; 12' Alvarez; 23' J.Torres |
Penalties
| Esposito (penalty scored) | 1–0 | (penalty missed) Amarelle |

Stade du Prado
Attendance: 7 000
Referee: (Netherlands) George Postma

26 July 2008
17:30

| Portugal | 4–5 | Brazil |
|---|---|---|
| Madjer 12'; Belchior 16'; Torres 23'; Alan 25' | Report | 10', 24', 28' Andre; 16' Benjamin; 34' Bruno |

Stade du Prado
Attendance: 6 000
Referee: (Uruguay) Carlos Aguirregaray

=== Third place play off ===
27 July 2008
17:30

| Spain | 4–5 | Portugal |
|---|---|---|
| Amarelle 7', 23', 25'; Nico 34' | Report | 2', 25', 27' Madjer; 12' Bilro; 29' Torres |

Stade du Prado
Attendance: 6 500
Referee: (Costa Rica) Erick Chavarria

=== Final ===
27 July 2008
19:00

| Italy | 3–5 | Brazil |
|---|---|---|
| Palmacci 29'; Pasquali 33'; Diego Maradona Jr 34' | Report | 8', 14' Bruno; 21', 23' Sydney; 28' Andre |

Stade du Prado
Attendance: 7 000
Referee: (Hungary) Istvan Meszaros

== Winners ==
2008 FIFA Beach Soccer World Cup
Champions

Brazil
Third title
12th world title

== Awards ==
| Golden Ball | Silver Ball | Bronze Ball |
|---|---|---|
| (Spain) Amarelle | (Brazil) Benjamin | (Portugal) Belchior |
| Golden Shoe | Silver Shoe | Bronze Shoe |
| (Portugal) Madjer | (Spain) Amarelle | (Portugal) Belchior |
| 13 goals | 11 goals | 10 goals |
Golden Glove
(Spain) Roberto Valerio
FIFA Fair Play Award
Russia

== Top scorers ==
13 goals

- (Portugal) Madjer

11 goals

- (Spain) Amarelle

10 goals

- (Portugal) Belchior

8 goals

- (Solomon Islands) James Naka
- (Senegal) Pape Koukpaki

7 goals

- (Portugal) Alan
- (France) Jeremy Basquaise

6 goals

- (Brazil) Benjamin
- (Brazil) Bruno
- (Uruguay) Ricar

5 goals

- (Brazil) Buru
- (Italy) Paolo Palmacci
- (France) Didier Samoun
- (Russia) Egor Shaykov
- (Italy) Simone Feudi
- (Italy) Roberto Pasquali
- (Argentina) Federico Hilaire
- (Brazil) Andre

4 goals

- (Uruguay) Martin
- (Brazil) Daniel
- (Argentina) Facundo Minici
- (Spain) Nico

3 goals

- (Senegal) Gomis Mbengue
- (Russia) Dmitry Shishin
- (Uruguay) Fabian
- (Portugal) Torres
- (Italy) Massimiliano Esposito
- (Iran) Ali Naderi
- (United Arab Emirates) Bakhit Alabadla
- (United Arab Emirates) Rami Al Mesaabi
- (Uruguay) Parrillo

2 goals

- (Russia) Ilya Leonov
- (Brazil) Betinho
- (Brazil) Júnior Negrão
- (El Salvador) Agustin Ruiz
- (Mexico) Christopher Flores
- (Spain) Javi Alvarez
- (Solomon Islands) Gibson Hosea
- (Senegal) Joan Etame
- (Iran) Mehdi Davoudi

2 goals (cont.)

- (Iran) Moslem Mesigar
- (Solomon Islands) Omo
- (Mexico) Ricardo Villalobos
- (Japan) Tomoya Uehara
- (Senegal) Victor Diagne
- (United Arab Emirates) Ibrahim Albalooshi
- (El Salvador) Tomas Hernandez
- (Russia) Alexey Makarov
- (Argentina) Cesar Leguizamon
- (France) Stéphane François
- (Portugal) Beirao Sousa
- (Portugal) Bilro
- (Italy) Diego Maradona Jr
- (Italy) Francesco Corosiniti
- (Italy) Giuseppe Condorelli
- (Brazil) Sidney
- (Italy) Giuseppe Soria

Own goals

- (Iran) Alireza Rahimi (for France)
- (Solomon Islands) Gideon Omokirio (for Portugal)
- (Cameroon) Ekwalla Eyoum (for the United Arab Emirates)
- (Cameroon) Aime Yombi (for Russia)
- (Japan) Katsuhiro Yoshii (for Brazil)
- (Uruguay) Coco (for Portugal)

35 others scored 1 goal each

== Final standings ==
| Position | Team |
|---|---|
| 1 | Brazil |
| 2 | Italy |
| 3 | Portugal |
| 4 | Spain |
| 5 | Argentina |
| 6 | Russia |
| 7 | Uruguay |
| 8 | France |
| 9 | Senegal |
| 10 | United Arab Emirates |
| 11 | Mexico |
| 12 | Solomon Islands |
| 13 | Iran |
| 14 | El Salvador |
| 15 | Japan |
| 16 | Cameroon |
