= Yuri Morales =

Puerto Rican footballer (born 1981)

Personal information
- Full name: Yuri Morlaes
- Date of birth: September 30, 1981 (age 45)
- Place of birth: San Juan, Puerto Rico
- Height: 1.83 m (6 ft 0 in)
- Position: Striker

Youth career
- 1997–1999: Harbor High School
- 1999–2003: University of Massachusetts Amherst
- 2003–2004: Salinas Valley Samba
2004–05	Viborg FF	4	(1)
2005–06	Ølstykke FC	23	(2)
2006	Portland Timbers	7	(0)
2006	Puerto Rico Islanders	0	(0)
2007	California Victory	29	(6)
2010	Beach Soccer Team Zurich	12	(35)
2010	Seattle Sounders Beach Soccer	4	(4)
2023	CRUZN (Oceanside USA Cup)	5	(6)
2023	Cali Beach Soccer (2023 World Winners Cup)	4	(0)
2024	Setubal Beach Soccer (2024 Mar Menor Cup)	6	(5)

International career
Years	Team	Apps	(Gls)
2005–2012	United States Beach Soccer	34	(37)

Yuri Morales (born September 30, 1981) is a Puerto Rican footballer who plays for the United States national beach soccer team.

Morales played previously with the Danish professional football club Viborg FF. He also played for Ølstykke FC, Puerto Rico Islanders, Portland Timbers and California Victory. During the 2010 season, Morales played with Beach Soccer Team Zurich where he was the Swiss Beach Soccer League top scorer (35 goals) and league MVP.

His family moved to Santa Cruz, California when Yuri was just eighteen months old. He is the son of Puerto Rican Raul Morales and Helen Nunberg.
