= Milano Beach Soccer =

Italian beach soccer team

- Full name: Milano Beach Soccer
- Nicknames: Rossoneri (The Red and Blacks)
- Short name: Milan
- Coach: (Italy) Emiliano del Duca
Home colours
Away colours
Third colours

Milano Beach Soccer is a professional beach soccer team based in Milan, Italy.

== Mundialito de Clubes 2016 squad ==
Note: Flags indicate national team as defined under FIFA eligibility rules; some limited exceptions apply. Players may hold more than one non-FIFA nationality.

No.	Pos.	Nation	Player
—	GK	BRA	Dida
—	DF	ITA	Dario Ramaciotti
—	DF	ITA	Angelo D'Amico
—	DF	BRA	Juninho Erivaldo Santos
—	MF	ITA	Roberto Pasquali
—	MF	FRA	Stephane François

No.	Pos.	Nation	Player
—	FW	SUI	Dejan Stankovic
—	FW	ITA	Paolo Palmacci
—	FW	SUI	Stephan Meier
—	GK	ITA	Stefano Spada
—	GK	SLV	Jose E. Portillo

Coach: (Italy) Emiliano del Duca

== Honours ==
=== International competitions ===
Mundialito de Clubes

- Group Stage: 2012
- Quarter Final: 2011

Euro Winners Cup

- Runners-up: 2014

=== National competitions ===
Serie A

- Winners: 2006, 2007, 2010, 2013
- Runners-up: 2009

Coppa Italia

- Winners: 2006, 2007, 2009, 2010

Supercoppa Italiana

- Winners: 2010
