= World Winners Cup =

International beach soccer/football competition

- Organiser(s): BSWW
- Region: World
- Teams: 24
- Related competitions: Euro Winners Cup
- Current champions: (Morocco) Amal Mogador (1st title) (Men's) (Spain) Rayo Barcelona (1st title) (Women's)
- Most championships: (Israel) Kfar Qassem (2 titles) (Men's) (Spain) Rayo Barcelona (1 title) (Women's) (Italy) Pavia Lokrians (1 title) (Women's) (Poland) Lady Grembach Łódź (1 title) (Women's) (Ukraine) BSC Mriya 2006-Servit (1 title) (Women's) (Brazil) Sao Pedro Beach Soccer (1 title) (Women's) (Spain) CD Higicontrol Melilla (1 title) (Women's)
- Website: Beach Soccer Worldwide

The World Winners Cup (WWC) is an annual worldwide beach soccer club competition contested between top teams held annually since 2019.

The first champion of the tournament was the Brazilian club Flamengo, while the current titleholder is the Moroccan club Amal Mogador.

== History ==
The first edition of the World Winners Cup in beach soccer was announced in April 2019. Initially scheduled for September 2019, the tournament was postponed by a month. The host city was the Turkish resort of Alanya. A total of 19 teams took part, divided into four groups. To participate, each club had to receive approval from its national federation.

The final match was contested between Brazil's Flamengo and China's Meizhou Hakka. Flamengo won 5–3 and claimed the inaugural title. The tournament had a total prize fund of €35,000, with the winner receiving €16,000.

The next edition was planned for October 2020. However, in July 2020, Joan Cusco, the president of the Beach Soccer Worldwide, announced the tournament would be postponed to April 2021. Eventually, it did not take place on the scheduled dates, and in September 2021, the tournament was postponed indefinitely.

In August 2022, it was announced that the competition would be held in September of the same year on the Italian island of Sardinia, at Poetto Beach in Cagliari. Out of 13 participating teams, German club Real Münster won the tournament, defeating El Salvador’s La Pirraya 9–3 in the final.

The third edition was hosted in Alghero, another Sardinian city. Without losing a single match, Italian club Napoli Beach Soccer emerged victorious, beating Latvian club Riga 6–3 in the final.

== Results ==
=== Men's World Winners Cup ===
Season	Host	Team	Winners	Final score	Runner-up	Third place	Fourth place	Ref
2019	Alanya, Turkey	19	(Brazil) Flamengo	5–3	(China) Meizhou Hakka	(Spain) Levante	(Iran) Shahin Khazar	
2022	Cagliari, Italy	13	(Germany) Real Münster	9–3	(El Salvador) La Pirraya	(Italy) Napoli Beach Soccer	(Germany) Rostocker Robben	
2023	Alghero, Italy	24	(Italy) Napoli Beach Soccer	6–3	(Latvia) Riga	(Cyprus) Paphos	(Spain) Bahia de Mazarrón	
2024	Alghero, Italy	24	(Israel) Kfar Qassem	4–3	(Israel) Rosh Haayin	(China) Zhejiang Ningbo TMS	(Ukraine) Vybir	
2025	Sicily, Italy	24	(Israel) Kfar Qassem	3–1	(Italy) Napoli Beach Soccer	(China) Zhejiang Ningbo TMS	(France) Marseille BT	
2026	Alanya, Turkey	32	(Morocco) Amal Mogador	11–8	(Paraguay) Sportivo Luqueño	(Ukraine) Sunrise Kyiv	(Israel) Kfar Qassem	

=== Women's World Winners Cup ===
Season	Host	Team	Winners	Final score	Runner-up	Third place	Fourth place	Ref
2019	Alanya, Turkey	5	(Italy) Pavia Lokrians	4–3	(Poland) Lady Grembach Łódź	(Russia) WFC Zvezda	(United States) NorCal BS	
2022	Cagliari, Italy	5	(Poland) Lady Grembach Łódź	RR	(Japan) Lazo Apego Kitakyushu	(El Salvador) Barra de Santiago	(Italy) FBA Beach Soccer	
2023	Alghero, Italy	9	(Ukraine) BSC Mriya 2006-Servit	5–3	(Brazil) Sao Pedro Beach Soccer	(Italy) Cagliari Beach Soccer	(Japan) Lazo Apego Kitakyushu	
2024	Alghero, Italy	10	(Brazil) Sao Pedro Beach Soccer	3–3 (p. 3–2)	(Spain) CD Higicontrol Melilla	(Poland) Red Devils Ladies Chojnice	(Italy) Cagliari Beach Soccer	
2025	Sicily, Italy	10	(Spain) CD Higicontrol Melilla	2–1	(Netherlands) Beach Soccer Zeeland Ladies	(Brazil) Sao Pedro Beach Soccer	(El Salvador) Beach Soccer UES	
2026	Alanya, Turkey	16	(Spain) Rayo Barcelona	4–3	(Brazil) Sao Pedro Beach Soccer	(Poland) Red Devils Ladies Chojnice	(United States) Nomads BS	

== See also ==
- Euro Winners Cup
- Euro Winners Challenge
- Women's Euro Winners Cup
