= Fabio Sciacca =

Italian footballer (born 1989)

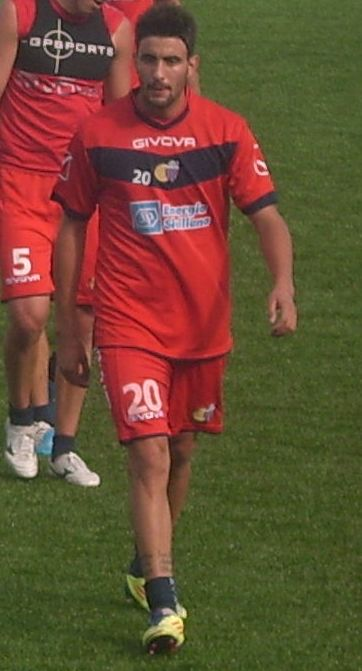
- Sciacca in 2011.

Personal information
- Full name: Francesco Fabio Sciacca
- Date of birth: 16 May 1989 (age 37)
- Place of birth: Catania, Italy
- Height: 1.81 m (5 ft 11 in)
- Position: Midfielder

Team information
- Current team: ASD Sancataldese

Youth career
- ?–2004: Paternò
- 2004–2009: Catania

Senior career*
Years	Team	Apps	(Gls)
2008–2014	Catania	26	(0)
2012	→ Grosseto (loan)	16	(1)
2013–2014	→ Ternana (loan)	2	(0)
2014–2015	Vicenza	16	(0)
2017	Castrovillari	2	(0)
2017–	ASD Sancataldese	11	(0)

International career^{‡}
2009–2010	Italy U20	10	(2)
2019–	Italy (beach)	54	(18)
- * Club domestic league appearances and goals as of 13 February 2018 ‡ National team caps and goals as of 12 February 2024

Francesco Fabio Sciacca (born 16 May 1989 in Catania), known as Fabio Sciacca, is an Italian footballer and beach soccer player.

== Club career ==
=== Paternò Calcio ===
Sciacca started his career in the youth ranks of Paternò Calcio and remained with the club until July 2004, when the club folded leaving the player without a team. He was successively signed by hometown club, Calcio Catania, where he later served as captain for the Primavera under-19 team.

=== Calcio Catania ===
Sciacca remained in Catania's youth system until 2009, but was called up to the first team squad for much of the 2008–2009 Serie A season, by then coach, Walter Zenga. He made his Serie A debut on 26 April 2009 as a half-time substitute for Cristian Llama versus relegation battlers U.S. Lecce, along with fellow youth teammate Vito Falconieri. With Catania in a safe position in the league table, head coach Walter Zenga often used a number of young players in the latter part of the season in order to let them gain top level experience. In a total of 5 substitute appearances since 26 April 2009, Sciacca has provided a string of impressive performances, which also ensured himself a place in the starting lineup against A.S. Roma on 16 May. In that game Catania wound up losing 4–3 thanks to a 92nd-minute goal from Cristian Panucci. Sciacca assisted Catania's first goal and set up the second goal in that fixture. He remained in the first team squad for the 2009–2010 Serie A campaign, however injuries have limited the youngster to just 6 appearances in all competitions. He returned to full fitness in December 2010, and finally re-joined the first team and began to play regularly under new coach, Diego Simeone.

On 7 January 2012, along with teammate Keko, Sciacca joined U.S. Grosseto F.C. on a 6-month loan. Both players returned to Catania on 30 June 2012. Following his return to the Sicilian club, Sciacca's campaign was hampered by injuries.

On 23 July 2013, Sciacca transferred to Serie B side Ternana on a season-long loan deal.

== International career ==
Sciacca's good performances at senior level with Catania also ensured him a first call-up from the Italian Under-20 team for a game on 19 May against Germany.

Sciacca has been part of the Italy national beach soccer team since 2019.
