= Gemma Hillier =

English footballer (born 1987)

Personal information
- Date of birth: 18 October 1987 (age 39)
- Place of birth: Gosport, England

Youth career
- 2000–2001: Gosport Borough
- 2001: Fulham

Senior career*
Years	Team	Apps	(Gls)
2001–2017	Portsmouth	300+	(99)
- * Club domestic league appearances and goals

Gemma Hillier (born 18 October 1987) is a former footballer and beach soccer player who is Portsmouth Women’s all-time record goal scorer and appearance-maker.

== Football career ==
Hillier came through the academies of Gosport Borough and Fulham before joining Portsmouth in 2001 at the age of 13, and during her time at the club, she played in the FA Women's Premier League and the Southern Premier League, while also winning the Hampshire County Cup fifteen times. While at Portsmouth, Hillier was offered the chance to join several of the top-league clubs, but she rejected to continue playing at Portsmouth without payment.

After captaining the club for eight years, she last played against Coventry United in October 2017 and retired in November 2017 after last being included in the matchday squad against Lewes.

Officially, Hillier made 292 appearances scoring 92 goals during her 17 years at the club but despite this, the FA records only start in 2003 and she had already been playing for the club since 2001, meaning she made over 300 appearances and is believed to have scored 99 goals.

== Beach soccer career ==
After retiring from association football, Hillier has since represented England and Team GB at several beach soccer tournaments including the 2016 and 2017 Women's Euro Beach Soccer Cup and the 2019 World Beach Games before retiring after reaching 21 caps.

She played for Terrassa-Bonaire BSW as a forward with 6 goals in 30 matches for the club.

== Personal life ==
She is a school teacher.

== Legacy ==
In 2018 she became the first Portsmouth Women player to be inducted into Portsmouth FC’s Hall of Fame.

== Honours ==
Portsmouth

- FA Women's/FAWNL Premier League Southern Division: 2011–12, 2014–15; runner-up: 2004–05, 2006–07
- Hampshire Cup: 2003–04, 2004–05, 2005–06, 2006–07, 2008–09, 2009–10, 2010–11, 2011–12, 2012–13, 2013–14, 2014–15, 2015–16, 2016–17
