= Beach soccer at the 2023 World Beach Games – Qualification (UEFA) =

- 2023 World Beach Games Qualifier – Europe
- Official event logo.

Tournament details
- Host country: Italy
- Dates: 29 August – 4 September 2022
- Venue(s): 1 (in 1 host city)
- № of events: 2 (1 men's; 1 women's)
- Teams: 20 (from 14 countries)

Men's event
- Teams: 13
Final positions
Champions	Spain
Runners-up	Portugal
Third place	Ukraine
- Matches played: 31
- Goals scored: 292 (9.42 per match)

Women's event
- Teams: 7
Final positions
Champions	England
Runners-up	Ukraine
Third place	Spain
- Matches played: 14
- Goals scored: 86 (6.14 per match)

Previous / Next edition
- ← 2019 2025 →

The UEFA qualifiers for the 2023 World Beach Games, known officially as the ANOC World Beach Games European Qualifier Catania 2022, was a beach soccer tournament contested by European national teams who are members of UEFA that took place to determine the nations from Europe that qualified to the beach soccer events at the second edition of the ANOC World Beach Games in Bali, Indonesia.

The tournament consisted of two events: the men's qualifiers and the women's qualifiers, both round robin and knockout competitions from which the top five teams qualified from the former and the top four teams qualified from the latter.

Organised by Beach Soccer Worldwide (BSWW), the competition took place in Catania, Italy from 29 August – 4 September 2022. The men's defending champions were Russia, but they were banned from entering the competition due to invasion of Ukraine; Spain won the men's title on this occasion. The women's defending champions were England, who successfully defended the title.

== Venue ==
The matches took place at the Sicily Arena Beach Stadium on Playa di Catania (Catania Beach).

== Men's tournament ==
=== Teams ===
13 teams entered the men's event. The entrants are listed below, ordered by their European Ranking in parentheses:

1. Portugal (2)
2. Switzerland (3)
3. Spain (4)
4. Italy (5)
5. Ukraine (7)
6. Germany (8)
7. France (9)
8. Turkey (10)
9. Azerbaijan (11)
10. Moldova (15)
11. Norway (18)
12. Czech Republic (19)
13. Sweden (23)

=== Draw ===
The draw to split the 13 teams into four groups – three of three teams and one of four – took place at 11:00 CEST (UTC+2) on 8 August 2022 at the headquarters of BSWW in Barcelona, Spain. Its procedure was as follows:

For the purpose of the draw, the 13 teams were split into four pots according to their world ranking – the hosts and three highest ranked teams were seeded and assigned to the heads of the groups; the next highest ranked teams were then placed in Pot 1, down to the lowest ranked team placed in Pot 3.

One team from Pot 1 and one team from Pot 2 were drawn into the four groups. The sole team in Pot 3 was drawn at random into one of the groups.

The composition of the pots is shown below:

Seeds	Pot 1	Pot 2	Pot 3
Italy (hosts) (assigned to A1); Portugal (assigned to B1); Switzerland (assigned to C1); Spain (assigned to D1)	Ukraine; Germany; France; Turkey	Azerbaijan; Moldova; Norway; Czech Republic	Sweden

=== Group stage ===
The group stage took place from 29–31 August.

==== Group A ====
Pos	Team	Pld	W	W+	WP	L	GF	GA	GD	Pts	Qualification	ITA	FRA	NOR
1	Italy (H)	2	2	0	0	0	22	5	+17	6	Quarterfinals	—	5–1	17–4
2	France	2	1	0	0	1	6	6	0	3	Quarterfinals	—	—	5–1
3	Norway	2	0	0	0	2	5	22	−17	0	9th–12th place semifinals	—	—	—

Source: BSWW
(H) Host

==== Group B ====
Pos	Team	Pld	W	W+	WP	L	GF	GA	GD	Pts	Qualification	POR	GER	MDA
1	Portugal	2	2	0	0	0	18	6	+12	6	Quarterfinals	—	12–3	6–3
2	Germany	2	1	0	0	1	8	14	−6	3	Quarterfinals	—	—	5–2
3	Moldova	2	0	0	0	2	5	11	−6	0	9th–12th place semifinals	—	—	—

Source: BSWW

==== Group C ====
Pos	Team	Pld	W	W+	WP	L	GF	GA	GD	Pts	Qualification	SUI	UKR	AZE
1	Switzerland	2	2	0	0	0	14	7	+7	6	Quarterfinals	—	7–3	7–4
2	Ukraine	2	1	0	0	1	8	11	−3	3	Quarterfinals	—	—	5–4
3	Azerbaijan	2	0	0	0	2	8	12	−4	0	9th–12th place semifinals	—	—	—

Source: BSWW

==== Group D ====
Pos	Team	Pld	W	W+	WP	L	GF	GA	GD	Pts	Qualification	ESP	TUR	CZE	SWE
1	Spain	3	3	0	0	0	20	10	+10	9	Quarterfinals	—	6–4	7–3	—
2	Turkey	3	2	0	0	1	16	9	+7	6	Quarterfinals	—	—	4–2	8–1
3	Czech Republic	3	1	0	0	2	11	12	−1	3	9th–12th place semifinals	—	—	—	6–1
4	Sweden	3	0	0	0	3	5	21	−16	0		3–7	—	—	—

Source: BSWW

=== Knockout stage ===
==== 9th–12th place ====
9th–12th place semifinals
1 September; 13:30; Report
Moldova	5
Czech Republic	3
1 September; 16:15; Report
Azerbaijan	6
Norway	3

Ninth place match
3 September; 08:30; Report
Moldova	2
Azerbaijan	5
Eleventh place match
2 September; 08:30; Report
Czech Republic	8
Norway	2

==== 1st–8th place ====
The quarter-finals winners, plus the winners of the fifth place match, qualify to the 2023 World Beach Games.

Fifth place match
4 September; 16:15; Report
Italy	5
France	1
Seventh place match
4 September; 11:00; Report
Germany	2
Turkey	1

5th–8th place semifinals
3 September; 17:30; Report
Italy	5
Germany	4
3 September; 11:00; Report
Turkey	2
France	4

Quarterfinals
2 September; 17:30; Report
Italy	4
Ukraine (a.e.t.)	5
2 September; 13:45; Report
Spain	8
Germany	3
2 September; 15:00; Report
Portugal	11
Turkey	4
2 September; 12:15; Report
Switzerland	9
France	6

Semifinals
3 September; 12:15; Report
Ukraine	4
Spain	7
3 September; 13:35; Report
Portugal	8
Switzerland	4

Final
4 September; 17:30; Report
Spain	6
Portugal	2
Third place match
4 September; 12:15; Report
Ukraine	4
Switzerland	3

=== Awards ===
==== Winners trophy ====
2023 World Beach Games – Europe Qualifier
champions

Spain
First title

==== Individual awards ====
Top scorer
(Spain) Chiky Ardil
11 goals
Best player
(Spain) Chiky Ardil
Best goalkeeper
(Spain) Dona

Source: BSWW

=== Top goalscorers ===
Players who scored at least four goals are listed.

There were 292 goals scored in 31 matches, for an average of 9.42 goals per match.

11 goals

- (Spain) Chiky Ardil

10 goals

- (Portugal) Léo Martins

9 goals

- (Italy) Emmanuele Zurlo
- (Italy) Gabriele Gori

8 goals

- (Azerbaijan) Amid Nazarov
- (Portugal) Bê Martins

6 goals

- (Portugal) André Lourenço
- (Switzerland) Noël Ott

5 goals

- (Portugal) Miguel Pintado
- (France) Jean-Stéphane Belhomme
- (Switzerland) Dejan Stankovic
- (Switzerland) Glenn Hodel
- (Spain) Jose Arias
- (Spain) Alejandro Achutegui
- (Turkey) Bariş Terzioglu

4 goals

- (Azerbaijan) Orkhan Mammadov
- (Moldova) Nicolae Ignat
- (Portugal) Belchior
- (France) Jérémy Basquaise
- (Ukraine) Oleksandr Korniichuk
- (Ukraine) Dmytro Voitenko
- (Switzerland) Sandro Spaccarotella
- (Germany) Joscha Metzler
- (Germany) Christoph Thürk
- (Czech Republic) Tomáš Huráb
- (Spain) Francisco Casano
- (Spain) Kuman

Source: BSWW

=== Final standings ===
Rank	Team	Qualification
1st place, gold medalist(s)	Spain	2023 World Beach Games
2nd place, silver medalist(s)	Portugal	2023 World Beach Games
3rd place, bronze medalist(s)	Ukraine	2023 World Beach Games
4	Switzerland	2023 World Beach Games
5	Italy	2023 World Beach Games
6	France	
7	Germany	
8	Turkey	
9	Azerbaijan	
10	Moldova	
11	Czech Republic	
12	Norway	
13	Sweden	

Source: BSWW

== Women's tournament ==
=== Teams ===
Seven teams entered the women's event which are as follows, ordered by their European Ranking in parentheses:

1. Spain (1)
2. England (3)
3. Switzerland (4)
4. Ukraine (5)
5. Czech Republic (6)
6. Italy (n/a)
7. Sweden (n/a)

=== Draw ===
The draw to split the seven teams into two groups – one of four teams and one of three – took place at 11:00 CEST (UTC+2) on 8 August 2022 at the headquarters of BSWW in Barcelona, Spain alongside the men's draw. Its procedure was as follows:

For the purpose of the draw, the seven teams were split into four pots according to their world ranking – the hosts and highest ranked team were seeded and assigned to the heads of the groups; the next highest ranked teams were then placed in Pot 1, down to the lowest ranked team placed in Pot 3.

One team from Pot 1 and one team from Pot 2 were drawn into the two groups. The sole team in Pot 3 was drawn at random into one of the groups.

The composition of the pots is shown below:

Seeds	Pot 1	Pot 2	Pot 3
Italy (hosts) (assigned to A1); Spain (assigned to B1)	England; Switzerland	Ukraine; Czech Republic	Sweden

=== Group stage ===
The group stage took place from 31 August – 2 September.

The group winners and runners-up qualify to the 2023 World Beach Games.

==== Group A ====
Pos	Team	Pld	W	W+	WP	L	GF	GA	GD	Pts	Qualification	ENG	ITA	CZE
1	England	2	2	0	0	0	9	2	+7	6	Semifinals	—	—	5–0
2	Italy (H)	2	1	0	0	1	8	6	+2	3	Semifinals	2–4	—	6–2
3	Czech Republic	2	0	0	0	2	2	11	−9	0	Fifth place match	—	—	—

Source: BSWW
(H) Host

==== Group B ====
Pos	Team	Pld	W	W+	WP	L	GF	GA	GD	Pts	Qualification	UKR	ESP	SWE	SUI
1	Ukraine	3	2	0	0	1	10	8	+2	6 (Note: Ukraine and Spain are ranked based on their head-to-head result.)	Semifinals	—	—	5–2	—
2	Spain	3	2	0	0	1	13	6	+7	6	Semifinals	1–2	—	—	8–2
3	Sweden	3	1	0	0	2	8	11	−3	3 (Note: Sweden and Switzerland are ranked based on their head-to-head result.)	Fifth place match	—	2–4	—	—
4	Switzerland	3	1	0	0	2	9	15	−6	3		5–3	—	2–4	—

Source: BSWW

=== Knockout stage ===
==== 5th place ====
Fifth place match
3 September; 09:45; Report
Czech Republic	3
Sweden	2

==== 1st–4th place ====
Semifinals
3 September; 15:00; Report
England	3
Spain	1
3 September; 16:15; Report
Ukraine (a.e.t.)	4
Italy	3

Final
4 September; 15:00; Report
England	3
Ukraine	0
Third place match
4 September; 13:30; Report
Spain	5
Italy	3

=== Awards ===
==== Winners trophy ====
2023 World Beach Games – Europe Qualifier
Champions

England
Second title

==== Individual awards ====
Top scorer(s)
(Spain) Cristina Gonzalez
6 goals
Best player
(England) Molly Clark
Best goalkeeper
(Ukraine) Anastasiia Terekh

Source: BSWW

=== Top goalscorers ===
Players who scored multiple goals are listed.

There were 86 goals scored in 14 matches, for an average of 6.14 goals per match.

6 goals

- (Spain) Cristina Gonzalez

5 goals

- (Italy) Veronica Privitera

4 goals

- (Switzerland) Sara Garcia
- (England) Molly Clark
- (Italy) Maria Vecchione
- (Ukraine) Yuliia Dekhtiar
- (Spain) Sara Tui

3 goals

- (Sweden) Tuva Klar
- (Sweden) Kajsa Sund

2 goals

- (Switzerland) Christine Schärer
- (England) Hannah Short
- (England) Wendy Martin
- (England) Gemma Hillier
- (England) Alisha Buckingham
- (England) Anne Meiwald
- (Italy) Giulia Olivieri
- (Italy) Roberta Illiano
- (Sweden) Ebba Nilsson
- (Ukraine) Anastasiia Klipachenko
- (Ukraine) Yuliia Kostiuk
- (Ukraine) Myroslava Vypasniak
- (Ukraine) Iryna Dubytska
- (Spain) Andrea Miron
- (Spain) Adriana Manau

Source: BSWW

=== Final standings ===
Rank	Team	Qualification
1st place, gold medalist(s)	England^{[a]}	2023 World Beach Games
2nd place, silver medalist(s)	Ukraine	2023 World Beach Games
3rd place, bronze medalist(s)	Spain	2023 World Beach Games
4	Italy	2023 World Beach Games
5	Czech Republic	
6	Sweden	
7	Switzerland	

Source: BSWW

a. England has no independent National Olympic Committee (NOC) and will instead be represented at the Games as Great Britain.
