= 2026 Women's Euro Beach Soccer League =

Tournament details
- Host countries: Spain; Moldova; Italy
- Dates: 20 May – 13 September
- Venues: 3 (in 3 host cities)

Final positions
- Champions: Spain (3rd title)
- Runners-up: Italy
- Third place: Portugal
- Fourth place: Poland

Tournament statistics
- Matches played: 31
- Goals scored: 208 (6.71 per match)

The 2026 Women's Euro Beach Soccer League was the sixth edition of the Women's Euro Beach Soccer League (WEBSL). It is the annual, premier competition in European beach soccer contested between women's national teams, succeeding the Women's Euro Beach Soccer Cup (2016–19). Organised by Beach Soccer Worldwide (BSWW), it is the women's version of the men's long-running Euro Beach Soccer League, which began in 1998.

The league consisted of two phases: two rounds of fixtures comprising the regular season, and the playoff event, the Superfinal, in which the teams then directly contested the league title, with the winners becoming WEBSL champions.

Portugal were the defending champions but lost to Spain in the semi-finals who then defeated Italy in the final to claim their third WEBSL title.

== Calendar and locations ==
The calendar was revealed on 20 March 2026.

Phase	Dates	Country	City	Stage
Regular season	20–24 May	Spain	El Puerto de Santa María	Stage 1
Regular season	29 July – 2 August	Moldova	Chișinău	Stage 2
Play-offs	8–13 September	Italy	Viareggio	Superfinal

== Stage 1 (El Puerto de Santa María, 20–24 May) ==
Matches are listed as local time in El Puerto de Santa María, CEST (UTC+2) and are those scheduled; actual kick-off times may somewhat differ.

All matches took place inside the Plaza de toros de El Puerto bullring, in tandem with stage 1 of the men's competition.

Key:	Qualified for the Superfinal /	(H) Hosts

Pos	Team	Pld	W	W+	WP	L	GF	GA	GD	Pts
1	Switzerland	4	3	0	0	1	18	9	+9	9
2	Spain (H)	4	3	0	0	1	20	13	+7	9
3	Ukraine	4	2	0	0	2	12	11	+1	6
4	Czech Republic	4	0	2	0	2	9	13	−4	4
5	England	4	0	0	0	4	6	19	−13	0

20 May 2026	Ukraine	4–1	England
14:45	Shulha 7', 8', 29'; Klipachenko 31'	Report	Meiwald 20'	Referee: Annett Unterbeck (Germany)

20 May 2026	Spain	5–1	Czech Republic
18:45	Jessi 17'; Hamouzová 19' (o.g.); P. Campoy 21'; Manau 24', 36'	Report	Portychová 25'	Referee: Leroy Schott (Germany)

21 May 2026	Switzerland	6–1	England
12:15	Eisenegger 2', 24'; Küffer 6', 27'; Inderwildi 31'; Barron-clark 34' (o.g.)	Report	Elouath 15'	Referee: Marcelo Ibáñez (Spain)

21 May 2026	Ukraine	4–1	Czech Republic
16:15	Klipachenko 6'; Kostiuk 17'; Koval 19'; Shulha 33'	Report	Čížová Š. 25'	Referee: José Pardeiro (Spain)

22 May 2026	Czech Republic	4–2 (a.e.t.)	England
14:45	Hamouzová 4'; Parker 36', 39' (o.g.); Chocholoušová 39'	Report	M. Barron-Clark 2'; Evans 25'	Referee: Leroy Schott (Germany)

22 May 2026	Spain	5–6	Switzerland
18:45	Andrea Mirón 6'; Jessi 7'; Carol Glez 26', 34'; Natalia 27'	Report	Schärer 6'; Nauer 6'; Eisenegger 9'; Küffer 10'; Flury 15', 16'	Referee: Annett Unterbeck (Germany)

23 May 2026	Ukraine	0–4	Switzerland
14:45		Report	Flury 2'; Inderwildi 7'; Schenk 18'; Eisenegger 36'	Referee: Vladimir Tashkov (Bulgaria)

23 May 2026	England	2–5	Spain
18:45	M. Barron-Clark 5'; Bloomfield 15'	Report	Jessi 15'; Andrea Mirón 19'; Laia 27'; Carol Glez 30'; Natalia 34'	Referee: Vladimir Tashkov (Bulgaria)

24 May 2026	Switzerland	2–3 (a.e.t.)	Czech Republic
14:45	Inderwildi 1'; Schenk 24'	Report	Portychová 27'; Chocholoušová 36', 37'	Referee: Leroy Schott (Germany)

24 May 2026	Spain	5–4	Ukraine
18:45	Sara Tui 9'; Andrea Mirón 11'; Jessi 18'; Natalia 29'; Manau 30'	Report	Kostiuk 7'; Klipachenko 30'; Prokopenko 31'; Dubytska 34'	Referee: Łukasz Ostrowski (Poland)

=== Awards ===
The following were presented after the conclusion of the final day's matches.

Stage winners trophy	Top scorer(s)		Best player	Best goalkeeper
Switzerland	(Switzerland) Michelle Eisenegger (Note: Jessi Higueras (Spain) and Anna Shulha (Ukraine) also scored four goals however did not officially share the award for reasons unknown.)	4 goals	(Spain) Andrea Mirón	(Spain) Laia García

== Stage 2 (Chișinău, 29 July – 2 August) ==
Matches are listed as local time in Chișinău, EEST (UTC+3) and are those scheduled; actual kick-off times may somewhat differ.

All matches took place at the FMF Beach Soccer Arena (also known as the Orange Arena for sponsporship reasons), with a capacity of 1,024. It took place in tandem with stage 3 of the men's competition.

Key: Advance to –	Qualified for the Superfinal /	(H) Hosts

Pos	Team	Pld	W	W+	WP	L	GF	GA	GD	Pts
1	Italy	4	4	0	0	0	17	5	+12	12
2	Portugal	4	3	0	0	1	16	9	+7	9
3	Poland	4	2	0	0	2	18	13	+5	6
4	Netherlands	4	1	0	0	3	12	19	−7	3
5	Belgium	4	0	0	0	4	6	23	−17	0

29 July 2026	Poland	6–5	Netherlands
14:45	Terka 3'; Matusiak 6', 9'; Dall'ara 21'; Kamińska 31'; Świt 32'	Report	Syl 7'; Nina 7'; Sharona 17', 35'; Nancy 30'	Referee: Vitalij Gomolko (Lithuania)

29 July 2026	Portugal	2–4	Italy
17:30	Flores 23'; Ferreira 28'	Report	Vecchione 15', 32'; Baldini 22'; Adami 30'	Referee: Vladimir Tashkov (Bulgaria)

30 July 2026	Poland	7–1	Belgium
14:45	Dall'ara 9', 29'; Konobrodzka 10'; Korda 15'; Terka 19'; Tobiczyk 20'; Kamińska 31'	Report	Maurane 6'	Referee: Jurijs Ivušins (Latvia)

30 July 2026	Portugal	4–1	Netherlands
17:30	Ferreira 11', 36'; Joana Meira 16'; Carolina 23'	Report	Sharona 22'	Referee: İdris Yavuz (Turkey)

31 July 2026	Netherlands	6–3	Belgium
14:45	Nancy 3', 14', 30'; Nina 26'; Sharona 30'; Nidia 32'	Report	Jordan 12', 23'; Deswaef 27'	Referee: Sara Fernández (Spain)

31 July 2026	Poland	2–3	Italy
17:30	Matusiak 22'; Dall'ara 32'	Report	Illiano 19'; Privitera 22'; Vecchione 33'	Referee: Laurynas Aržuolaitis (Lithuania)

1 August 2026	Italy	6–0	Netherlands
14:45	Privitera 7'; Veglio 9'; Massa 11'; Illiano 18'; Vergari 31'; Suzanna 33' (o.g.)	Report		Referee: Sergiu Proca (Moldova)

1 August 2026	Portugal	6–1	Belgium
17:30	Ema T. 4'; Joana Meira 5'; Flores 6'; Cristiana 12'; Daniela P. 20'; Ferreira 36'	Report	Anaëlle 36'	Referee: Vladimir Tashkov (Bulgaria)

2 August 2026	Italy	4–1	Belgium
14:45	Vecchione 9', 22'; Illiano 10'; Massa 17'	Report	Maurane 11'	Referee: Sara Fernández (Spain)

2 August 2026	Portugal	4–3	Poland
17:30	Constança 7'; Inês Cruz 14', 15'; Flores 17'	Report	Konobrodzka 30'; Korda 35'; Słowy 36'	Referee: Vitalij Gomolko (Lithuania)

=== Awards ===
The following were presented after the conclusion of the final day's matches.

Stage winners trophy	Top scorer(s)		Best player	Best goalkeeper
Italy	(Italy) Fabiana Vecchione	5 goals	(Italy) Fabiana Vecchione	(Italy) Martina Galloni

== Superfinal (Viareggio, 8–13 September) ==
Matches are listed as local time in Viareggio, CEST (UTC+2) and are those scheduled; actual kick-off times may differ somewhat.

All matches take place at Matteo Valenti Beach Stadium, with a capacity of 1,000.

=== Group stage ===
==== Draw ====
The draw to divide the teams into their respective groups took place on 6 August 2026.

Key: Advance to –	Semi-finals /	5th place match

==== Group A ====
Pos	Team	Pld	W	W+	WP	L	GF	GA	GD	Pts
1	Italy (H)	2	2	0	0	0	11	5	+6	6
2	Spain	2	1	0	0	1	5	3	+2	3
3	Poland	2	0	0	0	2	5	13	−8	0

9 September 2026	Italy	9–4	Poland
16:45	Massa 1'; Farnesi 3', 9'; Illiano 4', 32'; Adami 18', 22'; Privitera 24', 30'	Report	Matusiak 16', 33'; Terka 19'; Świt 32'	Referee: Annett Unterbeck (Germany)

10 September 2026	Italy	2–1	Spain
18:00	Adami 34'; Vecchione 36'	Report	Carol Glez 21'

11 September 2026	Spain	4–1	Poland
15:30	Andrea Mirón 26'; J. Serrat 27', 33'; Manau 30'	Report	Sudyk 7'	Referee: Dario Minder (Switzerland)

==== Group B ====
Pos	Team	Pld	W	W+	WP	L	GF	GA	GD	Pts
1	Portugal	2	2	0	0	0	11	5	+6	6
2	Ukraine	2	1	0	0	1	7	6	+1	3
3	Switzerland	2	0	0	0	2	4	11	−7	0

9 September 2026	Switzerland	2–4	Ukraine
14:00	Eisenegger 31'; Schenk 34'	Report	Kostiuk 2', 19'; Yurasova 28'; Klipachenko 32'	Referee: Vladimir Tashkov (Bulgaria)

10 September 2026	Portugal	4–3	Ukraine
14:00	Ferreira 1'; Constança 5'; Inês Cruz 8'; Cristiana 33'	Report	Klipachenko 7'; Kostiuk 12'; Soldatenko 21'	Referee: Davide Innaurato (Italy)

11 September 2026	Switzerland	2–7	Portugal
12:45	Inderwildi 13'; Küffer 31'	Report	Ferreira 2', 17'; Inês Cruz 2'; Flores 6'; Diana L. 17'; Ema T. 25'; Carolina 35'	Referee: Alicia Galán (Spain)

=== Knockout stage ===
==== 5th place match ====
12 September 2026
10:15

Poland	3–5	Switzerland
Świt 4'; Matusiak 9', 32'	Report	Schärer 5'; Garcia 12'; Bösiger 13', 30'; Williams 26'

Referee: Annett Unterbeck (Germany)

==== Bracket ====
Semi-finals
12 September
Italy	4
Ukraine	1
12 September
Portugal	2
Spain	5

Final
13 September
Italy	3
Spain (a.e.t.)	4
3rd place match
13 September
Ukraine	1
Portugal	3

==== Semi-finals ====
12 September 2026
14:00

Portugal	2–5	Spain
Carolina 14'; Constança 33' (pen.)	Report	Jessi 8'; Andrea Mirón 11', 34'; Pilar 18'; Manau 28'

Referee: Dario Minder (Switzerland)

12 September 2026
16:45

Italy	4–1	Ukraine
Galloni 4'; Illiano 18'; Veglio 24'; Vecchione 26'	Report	Klipachenko 6'

Referee: Annett Unterbeck (Germany)

==== 3rd place match ====
13 September 2026
13:45

Portugal	3–1	Ukraine
B.Tristão 3'; Ferreira 5'; Joana Meira 22'	Report	Kostiuk 21'

Referee: Annett Unterbeck (Germany)

==== Final ====
13 September 2026
16:30

Spain	4–3 (a.e.t.)	Italy
Sara Tui 14'; Andrea Mirón 19'; J. Serrat 24'; Carol Glez 37'	Report	Massa 2', 23'; Privitera 34'

Referee: Angelika Gębka (Poland)

=== Awards ===
==== Winners trophy ====
2026 Women's Euro Beach Soccer League
Champions

Spain
Third title

==== Individual awards ====
Top scorer(s)
(Spain) Andrea Mirón (Note: Justyna Matusiak (Poland), Érica Ferreira (Portugal) and Yuliia Kostiuk (Ukraine) also scored four goals however did not officially share the award for reasons unknown.)
4 goals
Best player
(Italy) Fabiana Vecchione
Best goalkeeper
(Spain) Laia García

=== Final standings ===
Pos	Team	Result
1	Spain	WEBSL Champions (3rd title)
2	Italy	Runners-up
3	Portugal	Third place
4	Ukraine	
5	Switzerland	
6	Poland	

== See also ==
- 2026 Euro Beach Soccer League (men's)
