= 2022 Women's Euro Beach Soccer League =

Tournament details
- Host countries: Portugal; Italy
- Dates: 1 July – 11 September
- Teams: 6 (from 1 confederation)
- Venue(s): 2 (in 2 host cities)

Final positions
- Champions: Spain (1st title)
- Runners-up: Italy
- Third place: Portugal
- Fourth place: Ukraine

Tournament statistics
- Matches played: 20
- Goals scored: 121 (6.05 per match)

Locations of the fixtures of the 2022 Women's Euro Beach Soccer League.

The 2022 Women's Euro Beach Soccer League was the second edition of the Women's Euro Beach Soccer League (WEBSL). It is the annual, premier competition in European beach soccer contested between women's national teams, succeeding the Women's Euro Beach Soccer Cup (2016–19). Organised by Beach Soccer Worldwide (BSWW), it is the women's version of the men's long-running Euro Beach Soccer League, which began in 1998.

The league consisted of two phases: two rounds of fixtures comprising the regular season, and the Superfinal, in which the top four teams qualified to then directly contest the league title, with the winners becoming WEBSL champions.

The league also acted as the qualification route to the 2023 European Games; the top five teams qualified to join hosts Poland.

Russia were defending champions, but were banned from entering the competition this year.^{[RUS]} The competition was won by Spain for the first time who claimed their second European crown following the 2016 Women's Euro Beach Soccer Cup.

== Teams ==
Six teams took part this season.

In accordance with sanctions imposed by FIFA and UEFA in response to the 2022 Russian invasion of Ukraine, the defending champions, the Russian national team, were banned from entering.

The numbers in parentheses show the European ranking of each team prior to the start of the season, out of 9 nations.

- Spain (1st)
- England (3rd)
- Czech Republic (5th)
- Portugal (7th)
- Ukraine (8th)
- Italy^{[a]} (n/a)

Notes
a: Teams making their debut.

== Regular season ==
Key: Advance to –	Superfinal semi-finals /	Superfinal 5th place match /	(H) Hosts

Pos	Team	Pld	W	W+	WP	L	GF	GA	GD	Pts
1	Italy (H)	5	4	0	0	1	26	11	+15	12
2	Spain	5	4	0	0	1	17	7	+10	12
3	Portugal (H)	5	3	0	0	2	17	16	+1	9
4	Ukraine	5	2	0	0	3	12	16	–4	6
5	England	5	1	1	0	3	12	15	–3	5
6	Czech Republic	5	0	0	0	5	8	27	–19	0

1 July 2022	Spain	2–3	Italy	Estádio do Viveiro, Nazaré
10:00 (UTC+1)	M. Corbacho 17'; Lorena 30'	Report	3' Pisa; 15' Saggion; 29' Vecchione	Referee: Malte Gerhardt (Germany)

1 July 2022	England	4–3	Ukraine	Estádio do Viveiro, Nazaré
12:30 (UTC+1)	Barron 15'; Haughton 18'; Dekhtiar 20' (o.g.); Martin 21'	Report	6' Kostiuk; 10' (o.g.) James; 21' Slavych	Referee: Ago Kärtmann (Estonia)

1 July 2022	Czech Republic	2–5	Portugal	Estádio do Viveiro, Nazaré
16:30 (UTC+1)	Hrušková 13'; Čulová 22'	Report	9' Jamila; 11' Ema T.; 26' Erica; 29', 29' Carolina	Referee: Nuno Madeira (Switzerland)

2 July 2022	Czech Republic	2–3 (a.e.t.)	England	Estádio do Viveiro, Nazaré
11:15 (UTC+1)	Mody 3'; Slavíková 16'	Report	1' Kempson; 34' (o.g.) Dlouhá; 39' Hillier	Referee: Francisco Costa (Portugal)

2 July 2022	Ukraine	1–3	Spain	Estádio do Viveiro, Nazaré
13:45 (UTC+1)	Kostiuk 27'	Report	5' Jessi; 22', 31' Lorena	Referee: Antoni Madeira (Switzerland)

2 July 2022	Portugal	4–3	Italy	Estádio do Viveiro, Nazaré
17:45 (UTC+1)	Flores 4', 15', 20'; Ines C. 29'	Report	12' Privitera; 16', 27' Vecchione	Referee: Jurijs Ivusins (Latvia)

3 July 2022	Ukraine	4–0	Czech Republic	Estádio do Viveiro, Nazaré
11:15 (UTC+1)	Vypasniak 6'; Dekhtiar 24', 35'; Kostiuk 26'	Report		Referee: Wilson Castanheira (Portugal)

3 July 2022	England	2–3	Italy	Estádio do Viveiro, Nazaré
13:45 (UTC+1)	Clark 6'; Martin 11'	Report	4' (o.g.) Buckingham; 5' Naticchioni; 35' Vecchione	Referee: Antoni Madeira (Switzerland)

3 July 2022	Spain	5–1	Portugal	Estádio do Viveiro, Nazaré
17:45 (UTC+1)	Lorena 2'; Maria 14', 29'; A. Miron 27'; Carol G. 34'	Report	27' Cristina	Referee: Malte Gerhardt (Germany)

8 September 2022	Portugal	5–3	England	Palm Beach, Cagliari
09:45 (UTC+2)	Ema T. 22'; Carolina 29', 34'; Andreia 29'; Cristina 36'	Report	25' Scadding; 35', 36' Kempson	Referee: Csaba Baghy (Hungary)

8 September 2022	Spain	5–2	Czech Republic	Palm Beach, Cagliari
12:15 (UTC+2)	Laura 10'; Lorena 12'; Andrea Miron 18'; Machackova 35' (o.g.); Sara Tui 36'	Report	11' Jungova; 14' Slavikova	Referee: Annett Unterbeck (Germany)

8 September 2022	Italy	7–1	Ukraine	Palm Beach, Cagliari
16:15 (UTC+2)	Privitera 2', 32', 33'; Vecchione 17', 18'; Pisa 20'; Ponzini 35'	Report	3' Klipachenko	Referee: Lukasz Ostrowski (Poland)

9 September 2022	Portugal	2–3	Ukraine	Palm Beach, Cagliari
09:45 (UTC+2)	J. Meira 1'; Jamila 18'	Report	13', 32' Vypasniak; 27' Klipachenko	Referee: Vladimir Tashkov (Bulgaria)

9 September 2022	England	0–2	Spain	Palm Beach, Cagliari
12:15 (UTC+2)		Report	15' Sara Tui; 18' Jessica	Referee: Malte Gerhardt (Germany)

9 September 2022	Italy	10–2	Czech Republic	Palm Beach, Cagliari
16:15 (UTC+2)	Vecchione 2', 2', 8', 28'; Iannella 7', 20', 31'; Privitera 12'; Olivieri 14'; Pisa 27'	Report	28' Cervenakova; 34' Culova	Referee: Eduards Borisevics (Latvia)

=== Awards ===
The following awards were presented after the conclusion of the first round of matches in Nazaré.

Nazaré stage trophy	Top scorer(s)		Best player	Best goalkeeper
Spain	(Spain) Lorena Asensio (Italy) Maria Vecchione	4 goals	(Portugal) Joana Flores	(Italy) Angela Ruotolo

== Superfinal ==
=== Consolation ===
==== Fifth place match ====
10 September 2022
09:45 (UTC+2)

England	11–4	Czech Republic
Clark 2', 22'; Kempson 8', 28'; Meiwald 10', 27', 35'; Martin 22', 33'; James 25', 29'	Report	12' Jungova; 23', 32' Cervenakova; 29' Culova

Palm Beach, Cagliari
Referee: Francisco De Oses (Spain)

=== Final four ===
Semi-finals
10 September
Spain	4
Portugal	1
10 September
Italy	3
Ukraine	1

Final
11 September
Spain	2
Italy	0
Third place match
11 September
Portugal	3
Ukraine	0

==== Semi-finals ====
10 September 2022
15:00 (UTC+2)

Spain	4–1	Portugal
Carol G. 1'; Manau 16', 36'; Cris G. 36'	Report	5' Ema T.

Palm Beach, Cagliari
Referee: Lukasz Ostrowski (Poland)
10 September 2022
16:15 (UTC+2)

Italy	3–1	Ukraine
Privitera 10'; Olivieri 28'; Saggion 32'	Report	30' Volovenko

Palm Beach, Cagliari
Referee: Sergio Gomes (Portugal)

==== Third place match ====
11 September 2022
13:30 (UTC+2)

Portugal	3–0	Ukraine
Kostiuk 15' (o.g.); Carolina 23'; Erica 27'	Report

Palm Beach, Cagliari
Referee: Moreno Longo (Italy)

==== Superfinal match ====
11 September 2022
16:15 (UTC+2)

Italy	0–2	Spain
	Report	8', 33' C. Glez

Palm Beach, Cagliari
Referee: Sergio Gomes (Portugal)

=== Awards ===
==== Winners trophy ====
2022 Women's Euro Beach Soccer League
Champions

Spain
First title

==== Individual awards ====
Top scorer(s)
(Italy) Maria Vecchione
10 goals
Best player
(Spain) Adriana Manau
Best goalkeeper
(Spain) Laura Gallego Silvente

=== Final standings ===
Key:
Qualified to 2023 European Games

Pos	Team	Result
1	Spain	WEBSL Champions (1st title)
2	Italy	Runners-up
3	Portugal	Third place
4	Ukraine	
5	England^{[b]}	
6	Czech Republic	

b. England has no independent National Olympic Committee (NOC) and will instead be represented at the European Games as Great Britain.

== Top scorers ==
The following table list the top 10 scorers of the 2022 WEBSL, including goals scored in both the regular and post season events.

Rank	Player	Goals
1	(Italy) Maria Vecchione	10
2	(Italy) Veronica Privitera	6
3	(Portugal) Carolina Ferreira	5
3	(England) Sarah Kempson	5
3	(Spain) Lorena Asensio Ruiz	5
6	(Spain) Carolina Gonzalez	4
6	(England) Wendy Martin	4
8	(Czech Republic) Jana Červeňáková	3
8	(England) Molly Clark	3
8	(Czech Republic) Michaela Čulová	3
8	(Portugal) Ema Toscano	3
8	(Portugal) Joana Flores	3
8	(Italy) Sandy Iannella	3
8	(Ukraine) Yuliia Kostiuk	3
8	(England) Anne Meiwald	3
8	(Italy) Melania Pisa	3
8	(Ukraine) Myroslava Vypasniak	3

Sources: Matchdays 1–3, Matchdays 4–5 and Superfinal

== See also ==
- 2022 Euro Beach Soccer League (men's)
