= Beach soccer at the 2019 World Beach Games – Qualification (UEFA) =

Beach soccer at the 2019 World Beach Games qualification (UEFA)
- 2019 World Beach Games Qualifier – Europe
- Official logo

Tournament details
- Host country: Spain
- Dates: 9–12 May
- Venue(s): 2 (in 1 host city)
- № of events: 2 (1 men's; 1 women's)
- Teams: 21 (from 16 countries)

Men's event
- Teams: 16
Final positions
Champions	Russia
Runners-up	Spain
Third place	Italy
- Matches played: 28
- Goals scored: 236 (8.43 per match)

Women's event
- Teams: 5
Final positions
Champions	England
Runners-up	Spain
Third place	Switzerland
- Matches played: 10
- Goals scored: 75 (7.5 per match)

Previous / Next edition
- 2023 →

The UEFA qualifiers for the 2019 World Beach Games, known officially as the 2019 World Beach Games – Europe Qualifier Salou, was a beach soccer tournament contested by European national teams who are members of UEFA that took place to determine the nations from Europe that qualified to the beach soccer events at the inaugural edition of the ANOC World Beach Games.

The tournament consisted of two events: the men's qualifiers and the women's qualifiers, the former a knockout competition from which the top five teams qualified, and the latter a round robin contest from which the top three teams qualified.

Organised by Beach Soccer Worldwide (BSWW), the competition took place in Salou, Spain from 9–12 May 2019.

The men's crown was won by Russia whilst the women's champions were England.

== Venues ==
For both the men's and women's tournaments, the two new beach soccer pitches that comprise part of the Complex Esportiu Futbol Salou in the city of Salou, Spain were used as venues.

Referred to as simply "Pitch 1" and "Pitch 2", the former, the main arena, had grandstands installed specially for the competition, with a capacity of 1,000.

== Men's tournament ==
=== Teams ===
The men's event was a 16-team tournament; entry was limited to the top 16 teams of the BSWW European Ranking issued for January 2019 – these nations received invitations to participate.

Three of the top 16 declined the invitations. Therefore, the next best teams in the ranking were then summoned in turn until three teams had accepted the invitation to fill the vacant spots.

The final entrants are listed below, ordered by the aforementioned European Ranking in parentheses (members of the ranking who could have entered but rejected invitations are struck-through):

1. Portugal (1)
2. Russia (2)
3. Italy (3)
4. Switzerland (4)
5. Spain (5)
1. ~~Poland (6)~~
6. Ukraine (7)
7. Belarus (8)
1. ~~Hungary (9)~~
8. France (10)
9. England (11)
10. Germany (12)
11. Czech Republic (13)
12. Azerbaijan (14)
13. Turkey (15)
1. ~~Estonia (16)~~
14. Greece (17)
1. ~~Romania (18)~~
2. ~~Moldova (19)~~
3. ~~Serbia (20)~~
15. Norway (21)
1. ~~Bulgaria (22)~~
16. Kazakhstan (23)

=== Draw ===
The draw for the opening round of the tournament, which also defined the arrangement of the teams in the bracket, took place at 12:00 CEST on April 15 at the headquarters of BSWW in Barcelona, Spain. The draw was assisted by Spanish forward Llorenç Gomez.

For the purpose of the draw, the 16 teams were split into four pots of four according to their world ranking – the highest ranked teams (plus the hosts) were placed in Pot 1, next highest in Pot 2 and so on, down to the lowest ranked teams placed in Pot 4. For each tie, teams from Pot 1 were drawn against teams from Pot 4 and Pot 2 nations were drawn to face those from Pot 3. The drawing of ties alternated as such and in the order they were drawn, each pairing was placed in the bracket from top to bottom.

The composition of the pots is shown below (World Ranking in parentheses):

Pot 1	Pot 2	Pot 3	Pot 4
Spain (hosts; 10); Portugal (3); Russia (4); Italy (5)	Switzerland (8); Ukraine (20); Belarus (27); France (31)	England (33); Germany (34); Czech Republic (35); Azerbaijan (38)	Turkey (39); Greece (46); Norway (52); Kazakhstan (55)

=== Results ===
The competition was played as a straight knockout tournament; starting with the round of 16, the winners of each round advanced through to the quarter-finals, semi-finals and ultimately the final with the winner crowned champions of the event. Meanwhile, the losing nations of each round receded to play in a series of consolation rounds and/or matches in order to determine all final placements. This meant all participants contested four matches.

The four teams that reached the semi-finals and the winner of the fifth place match qualified for the 2019 World Beach Games.

Matches are listed as local time in Salou, (UTC+2).

Note:
- England withdrew after the draw took place due to administrative issues, awarding all of their opponents walkovers (w/o).
- All matches took place at the main arena, other than those denoted by 2 , indicating that match took place on pitch 2.

Ninth place
12 May; 11:00; Report
Azerbaijan	5
Greece	3
Eleventh place
12 May; 09:45; Report
Germany	3
Turkey	6
Thirteenth place
12 May; 11:00; Report 2
Kazakhstan	2
Czech Republic	4
Fifteenth place
12 May
Norway	w/o
England

Consolation semifinals
11 May; 09:45; Report
Germany	4
Azerbaijan	5
11 May; 12:15; Report
Turkey	1
Greece	4
13th–16th classification
11 May; 11:00; Report 2
Kazakhstan	5
Norway	1
11 May
Czech Republic	w/o
England

Consolation quarterfinals
10 May; 11:00; Report 2
Kazakhstan	2
Germany	4
10 May; 12:15; Report
Norway	2
Azerbaijan	3
10 May; 11:00; Report
Turkey	5
Czech Republic	1
10 May
Greece	w/o
England

Round of 16
16:00; Report
Portugal	10
Kazakhstan	2
12:15; Report
Switzerland (p)	7 (3)
Germany	7 (2)
14:45; Report
Russia	7
Norway	0
12:15; Report 2
Ukraine	6
Azerbaijan	4
18:30; Report
Spain	8
Turkey	6
11:00; Report
Belarus (a.e.t.)	6
Czech Republic	4
13:30; Report
Italy	7
Greece	3
Report
France	w/o
England

Quarterfinals
10 May; 13:30; Report
Portugal	4
Switzerland	5
10 May; 16:00; Report
Russia	7
Ukraine	2
10 May; 18:30; Report
Spain	5
Belarus	0
10 May; 14:45; Report
Italy	10
France	2

Semifinals
11 May; 11:00; Report
Switzerland	3
Russia	4
11 May; 18:30; Report
Spain	5
Italy	1
5th–8th classification
11 May; 16:00; Report
Portugal	3
Ukraine	5
11 May; 13:30; Report
Belarus	5
France	3

Final
12 May; 18:30; Report
Russia	5
Spain	4
Third place
12 May; 16:00; Report
Switzerland	4
Italy	6
Fifth place
12 May; 13:30; Report
Ukraine	5
Belarus	2
Seventh place
12 May; 12:15; Report
Portugal	6
France	3

=== Awards ===
==== Winners trophy ====
2019 World Beach Games – Europe Qualifier
champions

Russia
First title

==== Individual awards ====
Top scorer
(Italy) Gabriele Gori
12 goals
Best player
(Spain) Llorenç Gomez
Best goalkeeper
(Russia) Maxim Chuzhkov

Source: BSWW

=== Top goalscorers ===
Players who scored at least 4 goals are listed.

There were 236 goals scored in 28 matches, for an average of 8.43 goals per match.

12 goals

- (Italy) Gabriele Gori

8 goals

- (Turkey) Cem Keskin

7 goals

- (Belarus) Ihar Bryshtel
- (Spain) Llorenç Gomez

6 goals

- (Spain) Javi Torres
- (Turkey) Baris Terzioglu
- (Italy) Emmanuele Zurlo

5 goals

- (Switzerland) Noel Ott
- (Russia) Dmitry Shishin
- (Russia) Artur Paporotnyi
- (Azerbaijan) Sabir Allahguliyev
- (Ukraine) Dmytro Voitenko

4 goals

- (France) Anthony Barbotti
- (Switzerland) Phillipp Borer
- (Portugal) Leo Martins
- (Portugal) Joao Gonçalves
- (Belarus) Anatoliy Ryabko
- (Spain) Eduard Suarez
- (Kazakhstan) Igor Demeshko
- (Russia) Fedor Zemskov
- (Switzerland) Dejan Stankovic
- (Portugal) Jordan Santos
- (Germany) Sven Korner

Source: BSRussia (in Russian)

=== Final standings ===
Rank	Team	Qualification
1st place, gold medalist(s)	Russia	2019 World Beach Games
2nd place, silver medalist(s)	Spain	2019 World Beach Games
3rd place, bronze medalist(s)	Italy	2019 World Beach Games
4	Switzerland	2019 World Beach Games
5	Ukraine^{[a]}	2019 World Beach Games
6	Belarus	
7	Portugal	
8	France	
9	Azerbaijan	
10	Greece	
11	Turkey	
12	Germany	
13	Czech Republic	
14	Kazakhstan	
15	Norway	
16	England	

Source: BSWW

1. Originally, UEFA were allocated four full berths at the Games; at the time this event occurred, only the top four teams qualified. However, the team that finished fifth in this event also had the possibility of qualifying – they were scheduled to contest a playoff match against the nation that claimed third in the CONMEBOL qualifiers with the winner of said match claiming an additional berth. However, the allocation of berths was later redistributed with UEFA now receiving five full berths. This meant that the fifth placed team, Ukraine, were awarded with qualification straight to the Games, without having to play in the playoff match.

== Women's tournament ==
=== Teams ===
Five teams entered the women's event which are as follows; their European Ranking is in parentheses:

1. Switzerland (1)
2. Spain (2)
3. England (3)
4. Russia (4)
5. Czech Republic (6)

=== Results ===
The competition was played as a single round robin tournament; the teams competed to earn points for the overall standings table – the three that accumulated the most points after all the matches were completed qualified for the 2019 World Beach Games.

Matches are listed as local time in Salou, (UTC+2).

Pos	Team	Pld	W	W+	WP	L	GF	GA	GD	Pts	Qualification
1st place, gold medalist(s)	England (Note: England has no independent National Olympic Committee and will instead be represented at the Games as Great Britain.) (C)	4	2	0	1	1	16	16	0	7	2019 World Beach Games
2nd place, silver medalist(s)	Spain (H)	4	2	0	0	2	19	13	+6	6	2019 World Beach Games
3rd place, bronze medalist(s)	Switzerland (Note: Originally, UEFA were allocated two berths at the Games; at the time this event occurred, only the top two teams qualified. However, the allocation of berths was later redistributed with UEFA now receiving three berths. This meant, as the team finishing third in the event, Switzerland were awarded with qualification to the Games post factum. However, Switzerland declined to take part. The spot was therefore offered to the next best team, fourth placed Russia, who accepted the offer to participate as the third UEFA representative.)	4	2	0	0	2	13	10	+3	6	
4	Russia	4	1	1	0	2	11	9	+2	5	2019 World Beach Games
5	Czech Republic	4	1	0	0	3	16	27	−11	3	

Source: BSWW
(C) Champion; (H) Host
Notes:

9 May 2019	Switzerland	2–0	Russia	Pitch 1
09:45		Report

9 May 2019	England	4–8	Czech Republic	Pitch 2
09:45		Report

9 May 2019	Czech Republic	1–5	Russia	Pitch 2
17:15		Report

9 May 2019	England	5–5 (a.e.t.) (1–0 p)	Spain	Pitch 1
17:15		Report

10 May 2019	Switzerland	9–4	Czech Republic	Pitch 1
09:45		Report

10 May 2019	Spain	2–3 (a.e.t.)	Russia	Pitch 1
17:15		Report

11 May 2019	Switzerland	0–3	England	Pitch 1
14:45		Report

11 May 2019	Spain	9–3	Czech Republic	Pitch 1
17:15		Report

12 May 2019	England	4–3	Russia	Pitch 1
14:45		Report

12 May 2019	Spain	3–2	Switzerland	Pitch 1
17:15		Report

=== Awards ===
==== Winners trophy ====
2019 World Beach Games – Europe Qualifier
Champions

England
First title

==== Individual awards ====
Top scorer(s)
(Czech Republic) Veronika Pilousková
(England) Sarah Kempson
(Spain) Andrea Mirón
5 goals
Best player
(Spain) Carla Morera
Best goalkeeper
(England) Hannah Haughton

Source: BSWW

=== Top goalscorers ===
Players who scored at least 3 goals are listed.

There were 75 goals scored in 10 matches, for an average of 7.5 goals per match.

5 goals

- (Czech Republic) Veronika Pilousková
- (England) Sarah Kempson
- (Spain) Andrea Mirón

4 goals

- (Russia) Natalia Zaitseva
- (Switzerland) Pascale Kuffer

3 goals

- (England) Katie James
- (Switzerland) Vanessa Meyer
- (Spain) Natalia Gómez
- (Spain) Lorena Asensio
- (England) Molly Clark
- (England) Gemma Hillier

Source: BSRussia (in Russian)

== See also ==
- 2019 FIFA Beach Soccer World Cup qualification (UEFA)
