= 2023 Women's Euro Beach Soccer League =

Tournament details
- Host country: Italy
- Dates: 20–24 September
- Teams: 9 (from 1 confederation)
- Venue(s): 2 (in 1 host city)

Final positions
- Champions: Spain (2nd title)
- Runners-up: Portugal
- Third place: Poland
- Fourth place: Czech Republic

Tournament statistics
- Matches played: 17
- Goals scored: 107 (6.29 per match)

The 2023 Women's Euro Beach Soccer League was the third edition of the Women's Euro Beach Soccer League (WEBSL). It is the annual, premier competition in European beach soccer contested between women's national teams, succeeding the Women's Euro Beach Soccer Cup (2016–19). Organised by Beach Soccer Worldwide (BSWW), it is the women's version of the men's long-running Euro Beach Soccer League, which began in 1998.

Originally, regular season fixtures were scheduled for July in the midst of a busy European calendar (including the European Games in June and World Beach Games in August). However, the men's UEFA qualifiers for the 2023 FIFA Beach Soccer World Cup were ultimately realised during these dates in July instead; the WEBSL regular season was not rescheduled. Hence, this season, all teams entered straight into the Superfinal, to compete to become the winners of the WEBSL; the event took place in Alghero, Italy.

Spain were the defending champions and successfully defended their title, defeating Portugal in the final.

== Teams ==
Nine teams entered this season.^{[a]}

The numbers in parentheses show the European ranking of each team prior to the start of the season, out of 12 nations.

- Spain (1st)
- England (2nd)
- Ukraine (3rd)
- Italy (5th)
- Portugal (6th)
- Czech Republic (7th)
- Netherlands (9th)
- Poland^{[b]} (10th)
- Sweden^{[b]} (11th)

Notes
a: In accordance with sanctions imposed by FIFA and UEFA in response to the Russian invasion of Ukraine, the 2021 champions, the Russian national team, is currently suspended from participating in the competition.
b: Teams making their debut.

== Superfinal ==
Matches are listed as local time in Alghero, CEST (UTC+2) and are those scheduled; actual kick-off times may differ somewhat.

=== Draw ===
No draw took place to allocate the teams into their respective groups. Instead, the teams were split based on the results of last season's final standings.

=== Group stage ===
Key: Advance to –	Semi-finals /	5th–8th place play-offs /	(H) Hosts

==== Group A ====
Pos	Team	Pld	W	W+	WP	L	GF	GA	GD	Pts
1	Czech Republic	2	1	0	1	0	16	10	+6	4
2	Italy (H)	2	1	0	0	1	12	9	+3	3
3	Sweden	2	0	0	0	2	5	14	–9	0

20 September 2023	Italy	5–2	Sweden	Main pitch
16:45	Vecchione 2', 11'; Privitera 12'; T. Santos 15'; Olivieri 18'	Report	Tuva 26', 36'	Referee: Angelika Gębka (Poland)

21 September 2023	Czech Republic	9–3	Sweden	Pitch 2
16:45	Matĕjková 11', 27'; Matilda 14' (o.g.); Pýchová 15'; Hrušková 16'; Dlouhá 18'; Čulová 19', 23', 25'	Report	Matilda 15'; Ida 29', 34'

22 September 2023	Italy	7–7 (a.e.t.) (4–5 p)	Czech Republic	Main pitch
16:45	Privitera 1', 4', 38' (e.t.), 39' (e.t.); T. Santos 18', 24'; Maiorca 24'	Report	Novotná 8'; Matějková 24', 37' (e.t.); Čulová 24', 25', 35'; Jungová 39' (e.t.)	Referee: Csaba Baghy (Hungary)

==== Group B ====
Pos	Team	Pld	W	W+	WP	L	GF	GA	GD	Pts
1	Poland	2	2	0	0	0	6	1	+5	6
2	Spain	2	1	0	0	1	11	2	+9	3
3	England	2	0	0	0	2	1	15	–14	0

20 September 2023	Spain	0–2	Poland	Pitch 2
16:45		Report	Okoniewska 7', 15'	Referee: Renata Jakab (Hungary)

21 September 2023	England	1–4	Poland	Main pitch
12:45	Martin 4'	Report	Okoniewska 1', 29'; Bednarska 22'; Kwiatkowska 28'	Referee: Raffaele Delvecchio (Italy)

22 September 2023	England	0–11	Spain	Main pitch
11:30		Report	M. Corbacho 4', 21'; Natalia 9'; L. Gallego 11'; Sara T. 15', 17', 30'; A. Miron 19'; Manau 20'; Cris 30'; Alcaide 34'

==== Group C ====
Pos	Team	Pld	W	W+	WP	L	GF	GA	GD	Pts
1	Portugal	2	1	1	0	0	7	3	+4	5
2	Netherlands	2	1	0	0	1	4	6	–2	3
3	Ukraine	2	0	0	0	2	4	6	–2	0

20 September 2023	Portugal	4–1	Netherlands	Main pitch
12:45	Ferreira 15'; J. Lucas 27'; Flores 29'; Daniela 36'	Report	Mariël 27'	Referee: Fiammetta Susanna (Italy)

21 September 2023	Ukraine	2–3	Netherlands	Main pitch
16:45	Vypasniak 15'; Dekhtiar 21'	Report	Nancy 24', 32'; Nidia 24'	Referee: Angelika Gębka (Poland)

22 September 2023	Portugal	3–2 (a.e.t.)	Ukraine	Pitch 2
16:45	Andreia 5'; Marta 15'; Flores 39' (e.t.)	Report	Volovenko 1'; Vypasniak 33'	Referee: Mehdi Sayoud (Belgium)

=== Play-offs ===
==== 5th–8th place ====
5th–8th place semifinals
23 September
Italy	5
Sweden	1
23 September
Netherlands	1
Ukraine	2

Fifth place match
24 September
Italy	6
Ukraine	2
Seventh place match
24 September
Sweden	0
Netherlands	7

===== Semi-finals =====
23 September 2023
16:45

Italy	5–1	Sweden
Vecchione 2', 12'; Maiorca 6'; Privitera 16', 36'	Report	Pernilla 18'

Main pitch
Referee: Angelika Gębka (Poland)

23 September 2023
18:00

Netherlands	1–2	Ukraine
Sylvana 26'	Report	Vypasniak 5'; Dubytska 22'

Pitch 2
Referee: Moreno Longo (Italy)

===== 7th place match =====
24 September 2023
09:00

Sweden	0–7	Netherlands
	Report	Nidia 2', 3', 3', 10'; Mariël 7', 10'; Allyssa 29'

Pitch 2
Referee: Moreno Longo (Italy)

===== 5th place match =====
24 September 2023
15:30

Italy	6–2	Ukraine
Tortarolo 8'; Pisa 16'; T. Santos 19'; Vecchione 25'; Naticchioni 30'; Privitera 34'	Report	Klipachenko 25'; Kostiuk 31'

Main pitch
Referee: Annett Unterbeck (Germany)

==== 1st–4th place ====
Semifinals
23 September
Poland	1
Spain	5
23 September
Portugal	2
Czech Republic	1

Final
24 September
Spain	3
Portugal	2
Third place match
24 September
Poland	2
Czech Republic	1

===== Semi-finals =====
23 September 2023
12:45

Poland	1–5	Spain
Zielinska 14'	Report	C. Glez 19'; Jessy 21'; A. Miron 25'; Sara T. 31', 35'

Main pitch
Referee: Renata Jakab (Hungary)

23 September 2023
14:00

Portugal	2–1	Czech Republic
Jamila 1'; Ferreira 30'	Report	Čulová 2'

Main pitch
Referee: Malte Gerhardt (Germany)

===== 3rd place match =====
24 September 2023
11:30

Poland	2–1	Czech Republic
Suskiewicz 2'; Nowak 35'	Report	Čulová 8'

Main pitch
Referee: Raffaele Delvecchio (Italy)

===== Final =====
24 September 2023
16:45

Spain	3–2	Portugal
Cris 9'; Carol 12'; Jessy 26'	Report	Ferreira 27', 28'

Main pitch
Referee: Fiammetta Susanna (Italy)

=== Awards ===
==== Winners trophy ====
2023 Women's Euro Beach Soccer League
Champions

Spain
Second title

==== Individual awards ====
Top scorer(s)
(Czech Republic) Michaela Čulová
(Italy) Veronica Privitera
8 goals
Best player
(Spain) Andrea Mirón
Best goalkeeper
(Portugal) Jamila Marreiros

=== Final standings ===
Pos	Team	Result
1	Spain	WEBSL Champions (2nd title)
2	Portugal	Runners-up
3	Poland	Third place
4	Czech Republic	
5	Italy	
6	Ukraine	
7	Netherlands	
8	Sweden	
9	England	

=== Top scorers ===
The following table list the top 10 scorers of the 2023 WEBSL.

Rank	Player	Goals
1	(Czech Republic) Michaela Čulová	8
1	(Italy) Veronica Privitera	8
3	(Spain) Sara Tui	5
3	(Italy) Maria Vecchione	5
3	(Netherlands) Nidia Bos	5
6	(Portugal) Érica Ferreira	4
6	(Italy) Taina Dos Santos	4
6	(Poland) Kornelia Okoniewska	4
6	(Czech Republic) Marketa Matějková	4
10	(Ukraine) Myroslava Vypasniak	3
10	(Netherlands) Mariël Miedema	3

== See also ==
- 2023 Euro Beach Soccer League (men's)
