= Beach soccer at the 2019 World Beach Games – Women's tournament =

2019 Women's beach soccer tournament at the World Beach Games
Tournament details
- Host country: Qatar
- City: Doha
- Dates: 11–16 October 2019
- Teams: 8 (from 4 confederations)
- Venue: 2 (in 1 host city)

Final positions
- Champions: Spain (1st title)
- Runners-up: Great Britain
- Third place: Brazil
- Fourth place: Russia

Tournament statistics
- Matches played: 16
- Goals scored: 127 (7.94 per match)

The women's beach soccer tournament at the 2019 World Beach Games in Doha, Qatar, the inaugural edition of the ANOC World Beach Games, took place over six days from 11–16 October. Along with the men's tournament, the two events comprised the beach soccer competition at this year's Games.

Organised by the Association of National Olympic Committees (ANOC), national associations of FIFA (beach soccer's governing body) from a territory with a National Olympic Committee (NOC) were invited to enter one team into preliminary qualification routes from which eight teams, representing four continental zones, advanced to the final competition; the hosts Qatar did not enter a team.

The tournament was a multi-stage competition, consisting of a round-robin group stage and followed by a single elimination knockout round, starting with the semi-finals and ending with the gold medal match, with all matches hosted on the Katara Beach.

The gold and silver medals were won by Spain and Great Britain respectively, with the former defeating the latter in the final 3–2. The bronze medal was claimed by Brazil who beat Russia in the deciding match.

== Competition schedule ==
The tournament began on 11 October, one day before the opening ceremony, and ended on the final day of the Games, 16 October.

Matches deciding medal winners took place exclusively on 16 October.

G	Group stage	SF	Semi-finals	B	Bronze medal match	F	Final / Gold medal match

Fri 11	Sat 12	Sun 13	Mon 14	Tue 15	Wed 16	
G		G	G	SF	B	F

== Qualified teams ==
With the exception of UEFA, the six continental zones of FIFA were each originally allocated one berth at the Games. However, neither the Asian Football Confederation (AFC) nor Oceania Football Confederation (OFC) ultimately entered any teams (China were due to enter a team as the AFC representative but withdrew). Therefore, these two vacant berths were redistributed, with CONMEBOL and CONCACAF each receiving one extra berth.

The following teams qualified from their zones via regional preliminary tournaments or invitation (hosts Qatar were eligible to enter a team automatically however declined to enter):

Means of qualification	Ref.	Dates	Venue	Berths	Qualified
2019 UEFA Qualifying Tournament		9–12 May 2019	(Spain) Salou	3	Great Britain^{[a]} Russia; Spain
2019 African Beach Games		19–23 June 2019	(Cape Verde) Sal	1	Cape Verde
2019 CONCACAF Qualifying Tournament		3–5 August 2019	(El Salvador) San Salvador	2	Mexico; United States
Invitation (CONMEBOL teams)		23 August 2019^{[b]}	–	2	Brazil; Paraguay
Total				8	

a. Competed in qualification as England. England does not have an independent NOC and is instead represented by Great Britain at Olympic events.
b. The dates of teams who qualified via invitation refer to when they were publicly revealed by the qualification organisers.

== Venues ==
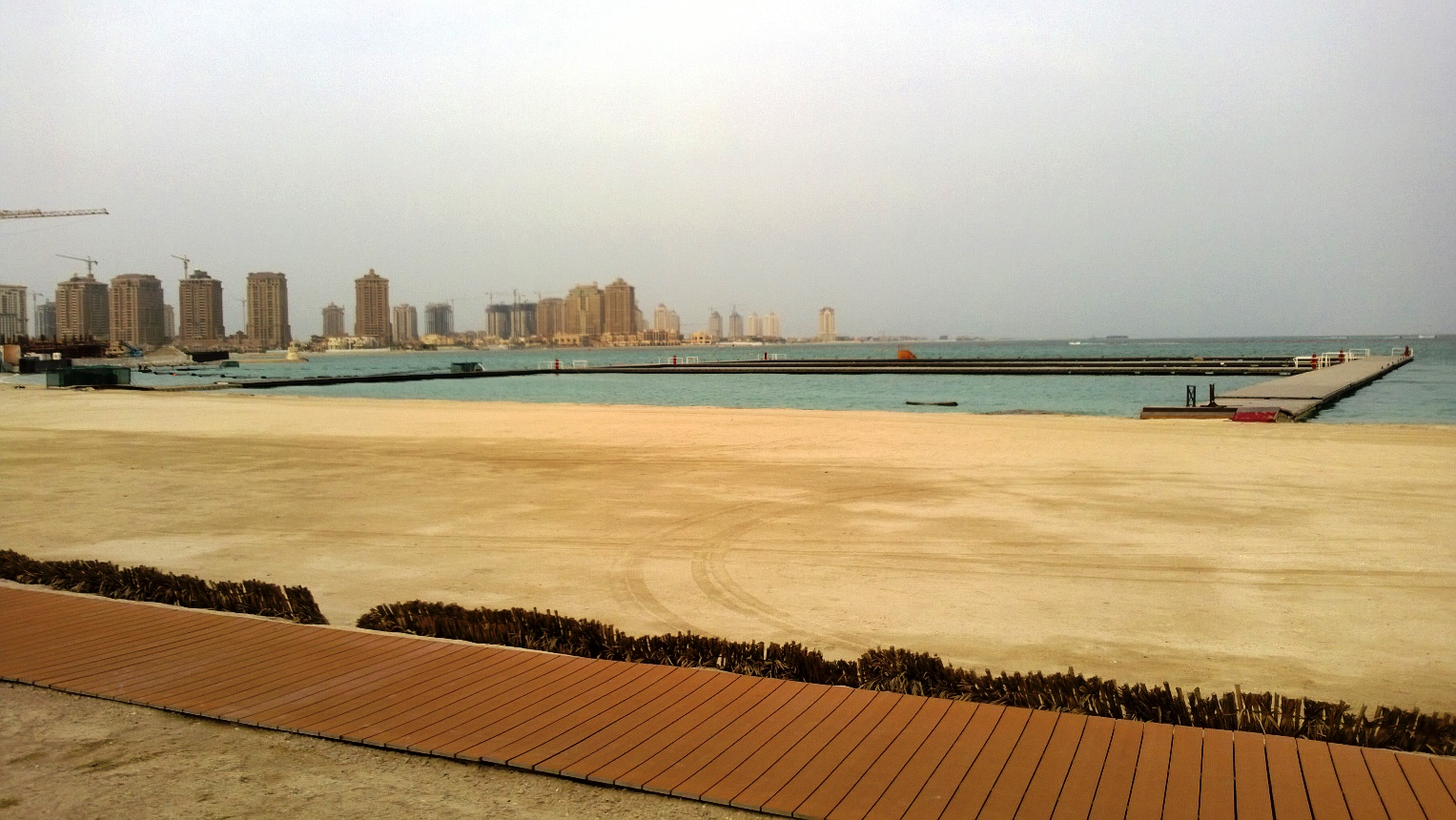
Katara Beach, Doha

The matches were held on the Katara Beach at the Beach Soccer Arena which consisted of two venues: the larger-capacity main stadium that hosted the majority of games and located adjacent, a smaller-capacity secondary stadium known as "Pitch 1" for all other matches which was only used during the group stage.

== Squads ==
Each team could enter a squad consisting of up to 10 players. A total of up to 80 athletes were expected to compete.

== Draw ==
The draw to split the eight teams into two groups of four took place at 10:00 AST (UTC+3) on 27 August 2019 at the Lusail Sports Arena in Doha, Qatar. Beach Soccer Worldwide (BSWW) vice-president Joan Cusco oversaw the draw.

For the purpose of the draw, the eight teams were split into two pots of four. Two teams from each pot were drawn into each group. Teams from the same confederation could not be drawn into the same group, except for UEFA nations for which one group was permitted to contain two. At the start of the draw, two teams from Pot 1 were automatically allocated to the groups – Spain (European ranking leaders), were assigned to position A1 and Great Britain, (European ranking deputy leaders (as England)), were assigned to position B1.

The composition of the pots is shown below:

Pot 1	Pot 2
Spain (allocated to A1); Great Britain (allocated to B1); Russia; Brazil	Cape Verde; Paraguay; Mexico; United States

== Group stage ==
Four of the eight nations, the winners and runners-up of each group, advance to the knockout stage.

All times are local, AST (UTC+3).

=== Group A ===
Pos	Team	Pld	W	W+	WP	L	GF	GA	GD	Pts	Qualification
1	Spain	3	3	0	0	0	25	6	+19	9	Knockout stage
2	Brazil	3	1	0	1	1	14	12	+2	4	Knockout stage
3	Mexico	3	0	1	0	2	12	19	−7	2	
4	Cape Verde	3	0	0	0	3	10	24	−14	0	

Source: ANOC
11 October 2019
18:00

Mexico	1–9	Spain
Leyva 35'	Report(ru)	2' C. Gonzalez; 4' S. Gonzalez; 5', 29' Mellado; 13' Gallego; 19', 32' Fresneda; 21' Miras; 33' Morera

Stadium, Katara beach
11 October 2019
18:00

Brazil	7–2	Cape Verde
Jasna 3', 10'; Colodetti 13'; Nayara 16', 33'; Villar 22'; Adri 31'	Report(ru)	2' (o.g.) Lele Lopes; 16' Rosangela

Pitch 1, Katara beach

13 October 2019
15:00

Spain	10–2	Cape Verde
Miras 3', 11'; S. Gonzalez 18'; Miron 20', 26'; Mellado 25', 28'; Fresneda 30'; C. Gonzalez 32', 33'	Report(ru)	5' Ruth; 33' Djoyce

Stadium, Katara beach
13 October 2019
15:00

Brazil	4–4 (a.e.t.)	Mexico
Nayara 9'; Adri 27'; Barboza 29', 32'	Report(ru)	1', 3' Luna; 16' Paulin; 26' Sanchez
Penalties
Barboza (penalty scored); Villar (penalty missed); Colodetti (penalty scored); Bastos (penalty scored); Jasna (penalty scored)	4–3	(penalty missed) Gallegos; (penalty scored) Leyva; (penalty scored) Perez; (penalty scored) Ramos; (penalty missed) Saucedo

Pitch 1, Katara beach

14 October 2019
18:00

Spain	6–3	Brazil
Miron 6'; Mellado 24', 34'; Fresneda 28', 35'; C. Gonzalez 31'	Report(ru)	14' Barboza; 15' Colodetti; 23' Medeiros

Stadium, Katara beach
14 October 2019
18:00

Cape Verde	6–7 (a.e.t.)	Mexico
Vanda 13', 15', 18'; Fortes 21'; Perez 23' (o.g.); Djoyce 27'	Report(ru)	1' Saucedo; 20', 29' Luna; 21', 25' Ramos; 34', 37' Sanchez

Pitch 1, Katara beach

=== Group B ===
Pos	Team	Pld	W	W+	WP	L	GF	GA	GD	Pts	Qualification
1	Great Britain	3	3	0	0	0	14	7	+7	9	Knockout stage
2	Russia	3	2	0	0	1	9	8	+1	6	Knockout stage
3	United States	3	1	0	0	2	6	10	−4	3	
4	Paraguay	3	0	0	0	3	9	13	−4	0	

Source: ANOC
11 October 2019
15:00

Russia	3–1	United States
Komarova 16'; Petrova 18'; Zaitseva 18'	Report(ru)	22' Quigley

Stadium, Katara beach
Referee: Łukasz Ostrowski (Poland)
11 October 2019
15:00

Paraguay	4–5	Great Britain
Godoy 20', 29', 29'; Mora 33'	Report(ru)	16' Hillier; 24' Kempson; 25', 28' Clark; 36' Haughton

Pitch 1, Katara beach
Referee: José Cortez (Mexico)

13 October 2019
18:00

Great Britain	5–2	United States
Kempson 1', 21'; Short 17', 19'; Hillier 29'	Report(ru)	18' Sunseri-Warp; 26' Quigley

Stadium, Katara beach
13 October 2019
18:00

Russia	5–3	Paraguay
Cherniakova 1', 31', 35' (pen.); Komarova 17'; Zaitseva 18'	Report(ru)	21' (pen.) Godoy; 22' Mora; 31' Caceres

Pitch 1, Katara beach

14 October 2019
15:00

Great Britain	4–1	Russia
Bazan 8'; Kempson 8'; Hillier 9'; Martin 16'	Report(ru)	14' Petrova

Stadium, Katara beach
14 October 2019
15:00

United States	3–2	Paraguay
Leslie 2'; Witteman 3', 20'	Report(ru)	5' Alonso; 7' Mora

Pitch 1, Katara beach

== Knockout stage ==
Semi-finals
15 October
Spain	3
Russia	2
15 October
Great Britain	6
Brazil	5

Gold medal match
16 October
Spain	3
Great Britain	2
Bronze medal match
16 October
Russia	3
Brazil	4

=== Semi-finals ===
15 October 2019
16:00

Great Britain	6–5	Brazil
Kempson 9', 35'; Martin 10', 29', 35' (pen.); Hillier 28'	Report(ru)	3', 26' Nayara; 3' Adri; 10' Barboza; 12' (pen.) Lorena

Stadium, Katara beach

15 October 2019
19:00

Spain	3–2	Russia
Fresneda 10'; C. Gonzalez 23' (pen.); Morera 32'	Report(ru)	2' (o.g.) Gallego; 4' Zaitseva

Stadium, Katara beach

=== Bronze medal match ===
16 October 2019
16:00

Brazil	4–3	Russia
Adri 15'; Lorena 19', 23' (pen.); Barboza 24'	Report(ru)	2' Cherniakova; 18', 32' Gorshkova

Stadium, Katara beach

=== Gold medal match ===
16 October 2019
19:00

Great Britain	2–3	Spain
Clark 6'; Barron 28'	Report(ru)	6', 7' Asensio; 9' Fresneda

Stadium, Katara beach

== Top goalscorers ==
Players with at least three goals are listed

7 goals

- (Spain) Carmen Fresneda

6 goals

- (United Kingdom) Sarah Kempson
- (Spain) Alba Mellado

5 goals

- (Brazil) Nayara Couto
- (Brazil) Natalie Barboza
- (Spain) Carolina Gonzalez

4 goals

- (Mexico) Marisol Luna
- (United Kingdom) Gemma Hillier
- (Paraguay) Fanny Godoy
- (Russia) Anna Cherniakova
- (United Kingdom) Wendy Martin
- (Brazil) Lorena Medeiros

3 goals

- (Paraguay) Jennifer Mora
- (Mexico) Esli Sanchez
- (Cape Verde) Vanda Delgado Graça
- (Brazil) Jasna Continentino
- (Russia) Natalia Zaitseva
- (United Kingdom) Molly Clark
- (Brazil) Adriele Rocha
- (Spain) Andrea Miron
- (Spain) Jessica Miras

Source: BSRussia

== Final standings ==
Rank	Team	Result
1st place, gold medalist(s)	Spain	Gold Medal
2nd place, silver medalist(s)	Great Britain	Silver Medal
3rd place, bronze medalist(s)	Brazil	Bronze Medal
4	Russia	Fourth place
5	United States	Eliminated in the group stage
6	Mexico	Eliminated in the group stage
7	Paraguay	Eliminated in the group stage
8	Cape Verde	Eliminated in the group stage

== See also ==
- Beach soccer at the 2019 World Beach Games – Men's tournament
