= 2018 Women's Euro Beach Soccer Cup =

Tournament details
- Host country: Portugal
- City: Nazaré
- Dates: 6–8 July
- Teams: 6 (from 1 confederation)
- Venue: 1 (in 1 host city)

Final positions
- Champions: Russia (1st title)
- Runners-up: Spain
- Third place: Switzerland
- Fourth place: England

Tournament statistics
- Matches played: 9
- Goals scored: 60 (6.67 per match)
- Top scorer(s): (Russia) Anastasia Gorshkova (5 goals)

The 2018 Women's Euro Beach Soccer Cup was the third edition of the Women's Euro Beach Soccer Cup, an annual European beach soccer championship for women's national teams, organised by Beach Soccer Worldwide (BSWW). The event was revealed on 28 March 2018.

Six nations took part in a three-day competition, hosted in the same location as the 2017 edition, Nazaré, Portugal, between 6 and 8 July, alongside stage 2 of the men's 2018 Euro Beach Soccer League.

England were the defending champions, but failed to progress pass the group stage, ultimately finishing in fourth place. The championship was claimed by Russia, who won the title at their first attempt.

== Teams ==
All six teams from the previous edition returned, except for Greece, who were replaced by Russia.

- Czech Republic
- England
- Netherlands
- Russia^{1}
- Spain
- Switzerland

Superscript key:
1. Teams making their debut

== Venue ==
Praia de Nazaré (Nazaré Beach) is the host location of the competition for the second year running	Location of Nazaré in Portugal.

All matches took place at the Estádio do Viveiro on Praia de Nazaré (Nazaré Beach).

The stadium had recently been undergoing redevelopment, increasing its capacity from 1,600 to 2,200. However, one part of the stadium was still awaiting upgrades, meaning the new capacity figure was yet to be fully reached.

== Draw ==
The draw took place on June 12, 2018, at BSWW's headquarters in Barcelona. The six teams were split into two groups of three.

Two teams were seeded and automatically allocated to the groups: England, as reigning champions, were allocated to position A1 and Switzerland, as runners up in the last edition, were allocated to B1. The unseeded nations were then drawn to accompany them in the two groups, with placement of the nations alternating back and forth between Groups A and B as each team was drawn out in turn.

Seeded nations	Unseeded nations
England (assigned to A1); Switzerland (assigned to B1)	Czech Republic; Netherlands; Russia; Spain

== Group stage ==
The teams compete in a round robin format. The winners of the groups proceed to contest the final. The respective group runners-up and third placed nations play each other in consolation matches to decide third through sixth place in the final standings.

Matches are listed as local time in Nazaré, WEST (UTC+1)

=== Group A ===
Pos	Team	Pld	W	W+	WP	L	GF	GA	GD	Pts	Qualification
1	Spain	2	2	0	0	0	12	0	+12	6	Advance to the Final
2	England	2	1	0	0	1	5	6	–1	3	Third place play-off
3	Czech Republic	2	0	0	0	2	2	13	–11	0	Fifth place play-off

6 July 2018
12:45

England	5–2	Czech Republic
James 15'; Clark 16'; Kempson 25' (pen.), 36'; Bazan 32'	Report(ru)	11' Matejkova; 25' Jungova

Referee: Dario Minder (Switzerland)

7 July 2018
10:15

Spain	8–0	Czech Republic
Mellado 12', 19', 24'; Miron 13', 18', 24'; Gomez 23', 35' (pen.)	Report(ru)

Referee: Francisco Henriques Costa (Portugal)
7 July 2018
19:00

England	0–4	Spain
	Report(ru)	9' Pascual; 29' Morera; 30' Asensio; 35' Miron

Referee: Christian Zimmermann (Switzerland)

=== Group B ===
Pos	Team	Pld	W	W+	WP	L	GF	GA	GD	Pts	Qualification
1	Russia	2	2	0	0	0	14	8	+6	6	Advance to the Final
2	Switzerland	2	1	0	0	1	9	10	–1	3	Third place play-off
3	Netherlands	2	0	0	0	2	4	9	–5	0	Fifth place play-off

6 July 2018
11:30

Switzerland	6–8	Russia
Heer 6'; Schenk 11'; Meyer 13', 27'; Samorodova 15' (o.g.); Birrfelder 16'	Report(ru)	4', 26' Gorshkova; 11' (pen.), 25' Fedorova; 12', 16', 35' Zaitseva; 28' Cherniakova

Referee: Torsten Guenther (Germany)

7 July 2018
09:00

Netherlands	2–6	Russia
De Bondt 11'; Verschoor 18'	Report(ru)	1' Samorodova; 8' Zaitseva; 15' Ivashkina; 25', 27' (pen.), 32' Gorshkova

Referee: Luca Romani (Italy)
7 July 2018
17:45

Switzerland	3–2	Netherlands
Morger 9', 28'; Birrfelder 22'	Report(ru)	6' De Hoek; 20' (o.g.) Morger

Referee: Sergio Gomes Soares (Portugal)

== Play-offs ==
=== Fifth place play-off ===
8 July 2018
10:15

Netherlands	1–2 (a.e.t.)	Czech Republic
Moudou 8'	Report(ru)	26' Pilouskova; 39' (pen.) Culova

Referee: Ivan Kirilov (Bulgaria)

=== Third place play-off ===
8 July 2018
11:30

Switzerland	6–3	England
Heer 3'; Grüter 8', 20'; Morger 19'; Schenk 26'; Kehrli 30'	Report(ru)	7' Hillier; 19', 28' Cheshire

Referee: Gary Christien (Belgium)

=== Final ===
8 July 2018
17:45

Russia	2–0	Spain
Cherniakova 29'; Fedorova 34'	Report(ru)

Referee: Sergio Gomes Soares (Portugal)

== Awards ==
After the final, the following awards were presented.

=== Winners trophy ===
2018 Women's Euro Beach Soccer Cup
Champions

Russia
First Title

=== Individual awards ===
Top scorer
(Russia) Anastasia Gorshkova
5 goals
Best player
(Russia) Marina Fedorova
Best goalkeeper
(Spain) María José Pons

== Goalscorers ==
5 goals

- (Russia) Anastasia Gorshkova

4 goals

- (Russia) Natalia Zaitseva
- (Spain) Andrea Miron

3 goals

- (Spain) Alba Mellado
- (Switzerland) Andrea Morger
- (Russia) Marina Fedorova

2 goals

- (England) Sarah Kempson
- (Switzerland) Ramona Birrfelder
- (Switzerland) Alina Grueter
- (Switzerland) Vanessa Meyer
- (Switzerland) Nicole Heer
- (England) Lauren Cheshire
- (Switzerland) Nathalie Schenk
- (Spain) Natalia de Francisco Gomez
- (Russia) Anna Cherniakova

1 goal

- (England) Molly Clark
- (England) Nadine Bazan
- (Netherlands) Aaike Verschoor
- (Netherlands) Aafke de Hoek
- (England) Katie James
- (Russia) Elena Ivashkina
- (Switzerland) Deborah Kehrli
- (Czech Republic) Michaela Culova
- (Czech Republic) Marketa Matejkova
- (Spain) Carla Morera
- (Netherlands) Bouchra Moudou
- (Czech Republic) Veronika Pychova
- (Spain) Ana Pascual
- (Spain) Lorena Asensio
- (Russia) Aleksandra Samorodova
- (England) Gemma Hillier
- (Czech Republic) Aneta Jungova
- (Netherlands) Joelle de Bondt

Own goals

- (Russia) Aleksandra Samorodova (vs. Switzerland)
- (Switzerland) Andrea Morger (vs. Netherlands)

== Final standings ==
Pos	Grp	Team	Pld	W	W+	WP	L	GF	GA	GD	Pts	Final result
1	B	Russia	3	3	0	0	0	16	8	+8	9	Champions
2	A	Spain	3	2	0	0	1	12	2	+10	6	Runners-up
3	B	Switzerland	3	2	0	0	1	15	13	+2	6	Third place
4	A	England	3	1	0	0	2	8	12	−4	3	Fourth place
5	A	Czech Republic	3	0	1	0	2	4	14	−10	2	Fifth place
6	B	Netherlands	3	0	0	0	3	5	11	−6	0	Sixth place
