= Russia women's national beach soccer team =

National sports team

Russia
- Association: Russian Football Federation
- Confederation: UEFA (Europe)
- Head coach: Ilya Leonov
- Most caps: various (25)
- Top scorer: Anna Cherniakova (20)
- FIFA code: RUS

First international
- Switzerland 6–8 Russia (Nazaré, Portugal; 6 July 2018)

Biggest win
- Switzerland 0–6 Russia (Nazaré, Portugal; 20 June 2021); England 2–8 Russia (Nazaré, Portugal; 12 September 2021)

Biggest defeat
- Russia 1–4 England (Doha, Qatar; 14 October 2019)

Euro Beach Soccer Cup
- Appearances: 2 (first in 2018)
- Best result: Winner (2018, 2019)

Russia women's national beach soccer team (Russian: Женская сборная России по пляжному футболу) represents Russia in international women's beach soccer competitions and is controlled by the Russian Football Federation, the governing body of football in Russia. The team was created in 2018.

The team won the 2018 Women's Euro Beach Soccer Cup in their debut appearance after defeating the teams of Switzerland, Netherlands and Spain.

== Current squad ==
As of August 2021

Note: Flags indicate national team as defined under FIFA eligibility rules; some limited exceptions apply. Players may hold more than one non-FIFA nationality.

No.	Pos.	Nation	Player
1	GK	RUS	Anna Akylbaeva
5	MF	RUS	Yana Zubilova
7	MF	RUS	Anna Petrova
8	MF	RUS	Anna Cherniakova
9	MF	RUS	Glafira Bazhanova

No.	Pos.	Nation	Player
14	MF	RUS	Natalia Zaitseva
16	GK	RUS	Viktoria Silina
17	MF	RUS	Daria Shkvara
19	MF	RUS	Lyubov Komarova
22	MF	RUS	Anastasia Gorshkova (captain)

Head coach: Ilya Leonov
Assistant coach: Ivan Kanaev

== Competitive record ==
=== Women's Euro Beach Soccer League ===
Year	Round	Result	Pld	W	W+	L	GF	GA	GD
(Portugal) 2021	Final	Winners	6	5	0	1	28	12	+16
(Portugal) (Italy) 2022	Suspended due to the Russian invasion of Ukraine								
(Italy) 2023	Suspended due to the Russian invasion of Ukraine								
(Portugal) (Italy) 2024	Suspended due to the Russian invasion of Ukraine								
(Spain) (Italy) 2025	Suspended due to the Russian invasion of Ukraine								
(Spain) (Moldova) (Italy) 2026	Suspended due to the Russian invasion of Ukraine								
2027	Suspended due to the Russian invasion of Ukraine								
Total	1 title	1/7	6	5	0	1	28	12	+18

=== Women's Euro Beach Soccer Cup ===
Year	Round	Result	Pld	W	W+	L	GF	GA	GD
(Portugal) 2018	Final	Winners	3	3	0	0	16	8	+8
(Portugal) 2019	Final	Winners	3	3	0	0	13	5	+8
Total	2 titles	2/4	6	6	0	0	29	13	+16

=== World Beach Games ===
World Beach Games										Qualification					
Year	Round	Pos	Pld	W	W aet/pso	L	GF	GA	GD	Round	Pos	Pld	W	W aet/pso	L
(Qatar) 2019 (Note: Originally, UEFA were allocated two berths at the Games; at the time this event occurred, only the top two teams qualified. However, the allocation of berths was later redistributed with UEFA now receiving three berths. This meant, as the team finishing third in the event, Switzerland were awarded with qualification to the Games post factum. However, Switzerland declined to take part. The spot was therefore offered to the next best team, fourth placed Russia, who accepted the offer to participate as the third UEFA representative.)	Third-place match	4	5	2	0	3	14	15	–1	Group Stage	4	4	1	1	2
(Indonesia) 2023	Suspended due to the Russian invasion of Ukraine									Suspended due to the Russian invasion of Ukraine					
(Vietnam) 2027	Suspended due to the Russian invasion of Ukraine									Suspended due to the Russian invasion of Ukraine					
Total	0 Titles	1/3	5	2	0	3	14	15	–1	0 Titles	1/3	4	1	1	2

=== Head-to-head records ===
Includes competitive and friendly matches.

Team	First	Last	Record	Win %
Spain	2018	2021	4–2	67%
Netherlands	2018	2021	3–0	100%
Switzerland	2018	2021	2–1	67%
Czech Republic	2019	2021	2–0	100%
England	2019	2021	2–2	50%
Belarus	2019	2019	2–0	100%
United States	2019	2021	2–0	100%
Paraguay	2019	2019	1–0	100%
Great Britain	2019	2019	0–1	0%
Brazil	2019	2021	1–1	50%
Ukraine	2021	2021	1–0	100%
Totals	2018	2021	20–7	74%

== Recent results and upcoming fixtures ==
Matches played within the last 12 months, as well as upcoming fixtures, are displayed.

6 July 2018 2018 EBSC	Switzerland	6–8	Russia	Nazaré, Portugal
12:30	Heer 6'; Schenk 11'; Meyer 13', 27'; Samorodova 15'; Birrfelder 16'	Report	4', 26' Gorshkova; 11' (pen.), 25' Fedorova; 12', 16', 35' Zaitseva; (yellow card) 15' Cherniakova; 28' (o.g.) Meyer	Referee: Torsten Günther (Germany)

7 July 2018 2018 EBSC	Netherlands	2–6	Russia	Nazaré, Portugal
10:00	De Bondt 11'; Verschoor 18'; Jongsma (red card) 27'	Report	1' Samorodova; 8' Zaitseva; 15' Ivashkina; 25', 27' (pen.), 32' Gorshkova	Referee: Luca Romani (Italy)

8 July 2018 2018 EBSC, Final	Russia	2–0	Spain	Nazaré, Portugal
18:45	Cherniakova 29'; Fedorova 34'	Report		Referee: Sergio Gomes Soares (Portuguese)

9 May 2019 2019 WBG, Qualifiers	Russia	0–2	Switzerland	Salou, Spain
9:45		Report	5', 15' (pen.) Küffer; (yellow card) 25' Meyer	Referee: Miguel Moreno Gonzalez (Spain)

9 May 2019 2019 WBG, Qualifiers	Czech Republic	1–5	Russia	Salou, Spain
17:15	Dlouhá 25'; Slavíková (yellow card) 29'	Report	1', 32' Zaitseva; 6', 14' Cherniakova; 34' Gorshkova	Referee: Miguel Teruel (Portugal)

10 May 2019 2019 WBG, Qualifiers	Russia	3–2 (a.e.t.)	Spain	Salou, Spain
17:25	Ivashkina 5', 38'; Cherniakova (yellow card) 10'; Zaitseva 23'	Report	17' Ruiz; 35' Miron	Referee: Raffaele Del Vecchio (San Marino)

12 May 2019 2019 WBG, Qualifiers	England	4–3	Russia	Salou, Spain
14:45	Gemma 12'; Short (yellow card) 19'; Gorshkova 21' (o.g.); Kempson 22'; Clark 31'	Report	6' Gorshkova; 24' Bazhanova; 29' Zaitseva	Referee: Silvia Perez (Spain)

5 July 2019 2019 EBSC	England	1–3	Russia	Nazaré, Portugal
11:00	Kempson 23'	Report	14' Gorshkova; 25', 36' Cherniakova	Stadium: Estádio do Viveiro; Referee: Jonathan Mallia (Malta)

6 July 2019 2019 EBSC	Russia	7–2	Netherlands	Nazaré, Portugal
10:15	Silina 4'; Fedorova 5', 8', 14'; Miedema 17' (o.g.); Cherniakova 27'; Gorshkova 33'	Report	27', 30' Loth	Stadium: Estádio do Viveiro; Referee: Saverio Bottalico (Italy)

7 July 2019 2019 EBSC, Final	Russia	3–2	Spain	Nazaré, Portugal
19:15	Fedorova 22'; Cherniakova 23'; Gorshkova 25'; Petrova (yellow card) 27'; Akylbaeva (yellow card) 34'	Report	27' (o.g.) Khutornaia; 34' (pen.) Martinez	Stadium: Estádio do Viveiro; Referee: Francisco Henriques Costa (Portuguese)

26 July 2019 Moscow Women's Challenge 2019, Final (friendly)	Russia	4–1	Belarus	Moscow, Russia
15:00	Akylbaeva 1'; Silina 16'; Kanaeva (yellow card) 17' (goal) 28'; Dolmatova 22'	Report	27' Gavrilenya	Stadium: Luzhniki Olympic Complex; Referee: Denis Smolyaninov (Russia)

27 July 2019 Moscow Women's Challenge 2019, Final (friendly)	Russia	0–0 (a.e.t.) (2–1 p)	Belarus	Moscow, Russia
13:30		Report	(yellow card) 32' Buzinova	Stadium: Luzhniki Olympic Complex; Referee: Sergio Gomes Soares (Portugal)
	Penalties
	Cherniakova (penalty scored); Kanaeva (penalty scored); Dolmatova (penalty missed)		(penalty missed) Buzinova; (penalty scored) Gorbunova; (penalty missed) Kuchinskaya

11 October 2019 2019 AWBG, Group stage	Russia	3–1	United States	Doha, Qatar
15:00	Komarova 16'; Petrova 18'; Zaitseva 18'	Report	22' Quigley	Stadium: Katara Beach; Referee: Lukasz Ostrowski (Poland)

12 October 2019 2019 AWBG, Group stage	Russia	5–3	Paraguay	Doha, Qatar
18:00	Cherniakova 1', 31', 35' (pen.); Komarova 18'; Zaitseva 18'	Report	21' Godoy; 22' Mora; 31' Cacares; (yellow card) 35' Recalde	Stadium: Katara Beach; Referee: Hassan Abed Rabbo (Lebanon)

14 October 2019 2019 AWBG, Group stage	Great Britain	4–1	Russia	Stadium, Katara beach
15:00	Bazan 8'; Kempson 8'; Hillier 9'; Martin 16'	Report(ru)	14' Petrova

15 October 2019 2019 AWBG, Semifinals	Spain	3–2	Russia	Stadium, Katara beach
19:00	Fresneda 10'; C. Gonzalez 23' (pen.); Morera 32'	Report(ru)	2' (o.g.) Gallego; 4' Zaitseva

16 October 2019 2019 AWBG, Third-place match	Brazil	4–3	Russia	Stadium, Katara beach
16:00	Adri 15'; Lorena 19', 23' (pen.); Barboza 24'	Report(ru)	2' Cherniakova; 18', 32' Gorshkova

17 June 2021 2021 EBSL, Group stage	Russia	4–1	Czech Republic	Nazaré, Portugal
11:00	Gorshkova 12', 20'; Cherniakova 25'; Zaitseva 33'	Report	25' Jablončíková	Stadium: Estádio do Viveiro – Jordan Santos

19 June 2021 2021 EBSL, Group stage	England	3–1	Russia	Nazaré, Portugal
11:00	Haughton 3'; Kempson 27'; Barron 32'	Report	26' Bychkova	Stadium: Estádio do Viveiro – Jordan Santos

20 June 2021 2021 EBSL, Third-place match	Switzerland	0–6	Russia	Nazaré, Portugal
12:45		Report	7' Zaytseva; 10' Akylbaeva; 17', 31' Shkvara; 20' Bychkova; 31' Cherniakova	Stadium: Estádio do Viveiro – Jordan Santos

13 August 2021 2021 IBSC, Group stage	Russia	3–2 (a.e.t.)	United States	Moscow, Russia
18:30	7' Cherniakova; (yellow card) 17' (goal) 39' Bychkova	Report	26' (yellow card) 34' Leslie	Stadium: Luzhniki Beach Soccer Stadium

14 August 2021 2021 IBSC, Group stage	Russia	3–4	Spain	Moscow, Russia
18:30	9', 18' Cherniakova; (yellow card) 11' Shkvara	Report	7' Morga; 23' Guitérrez; 27' (yellow card) 29' González; 31' Miras	Stadium: Luzhniki Beach Soccer Stadium

15 August 2021 2021 IBSC, Group stage	Russia	4–1	Brazil	Moscow, Russia
18:30	9' Akylbaeva; 13' (yellow card) 35' Zubilova; 19' Bazhanova; 22' Cherniakova	Report	18' Pais	Stadium: Luzhniki Beach Soccer Stadium

9 September 2021 2021 EBSL, Superfinal	Russia	4–2	Ukraine	Nazaré, Portugal
13:00	8' Petrova; (yellow card) 18' Shkvara; 21' Petrova; 25' Zubilova; 34' Akylbaeva	Report	11' Kramna; 16' (yellow card) 34' Tikhonova	Stadium: Estádio do Viveiro – Jordan Santos

10 September 2021 2021 EBSL, Superfinal	Russia	7–4	Netherlands	Nazaré, Portugal
13:00	5' Gorshkova; 9' Kanaeva; 10', 35' (yellow card) 34' Cherniakova; 12' Akylbaeva; 12', 34' Bazhanova	Report	14', 20' (yellow card) 29' Drost; 19' Tieleman; 34' Moudou	Stadium: Estádio do Viveiro – Jordan Santos

11 September 2021 2021 EBSL, Superfinal	Spain	0–4	Russia	Nazaré, Portugal
13:00		Report	20' Akylbaeva; (yellow card) 25' Cherniakova; 28', 35' Zubilova; (yellow card) 32' Petrova; 32' Zaitseva	Stadium: Estádio do Viveiro – Jordan Santos

12 September 2021 2021 EBSL, Superfinal	England	2–8	Russia	Nazaré, Portugal
17:30	12' Hillier; 26' Clark	Report	4' (o.g.) Kempson; 5' Bazhanova; 13', 29' Petrova; 20' Cherniakova; 21' (yellow card) 28' Zubilova; 25' Zaitseva; 32' (o.g.) Scadding	Stadium: Estádio do Viveiro – Jordan Santos

== See also ==
- Russia men's national beach soccer team
