= 2019 Women's Euro Beach Soccer Cup =

Tournament details
- Host country: Portugal
- City: Nazaré
- Dates: 5–7 July
- Teams: 6 (from 1 confederation)
- Venues: 2 (in 1 host city)

Final positions
- Champions: Russia (2nd title)
- Runners-up: Spain
- Third place: Switzerland
- Fourth place: England

Tournament statistics
- Matches played: 9
- Goals scored: 74 (8.22 per match)
- Top scorer(s): (Russia) Anna Cherniakova (Russia) Marina Fedorova (Switzerland) Nathalie Schenk (Switzerland) Eva Bachmann (England) Molly Clark (4 goals each)

The 2019 Women’s Euro Beach Soccer Cup was the fourth edition of the Women's Euro Beach Soccer Cup, an annual European beach soccer championship for women's national teams, organised by Beach Soccer Worldwide (BSWW). The event was revealed on 25 April 2019.

Six nations took part in a three-day competition, hosted in the same location as the previous two editions, Nazaré, Portugal, between 5 and 7 July, alongside the first stage of the men's 2019 Euro Beach Soccer League. It was the final edition of the competition, being replaced by the Women's Euro Beach Soccer League.

Russia were the defending champions and successfully retained their crown, defeating Spain in the final to win their second successive title, also becoming the first nation to win the tournament more than once.

== Teams ==
For the first time, all six teams from the previous edition of the championship returned and hence no teams made their debut.

Team	Appearance	Best performance	Rank^{1}
Czech Republic	3rd	Fourth place (2017)	5th
England	4th	Champions (2017)	1st
Netherlands	4th	Third place (2017)	6th
Russia	2nd	Champions (2018)	4th
Spain	4th	Champions (2016)	2nd
Switzerland	4th	Runners-up (2016, 2017)	3rd

1. This column shows the European ranking of the teams compiled by BSWW as of June 2019.

== Venue ==
Praia de Nazaré (Nazaré Beach) is the host location of the competition for the third year running	Location of Nazaré in Portugal.

All matches took place at the Estádio do Viveiro on Praia de Nazaré (Nazaré Beach) with a capacity of 2,200, except for one match that took place on an external, purpose built pitch known as "Pitch 2".

== Draw ==
Unlike in previous editions, the draw was not held publicly and its details were not disclosed.

== Group stage ==
The teams compete in a round robin format. The winners of the groups proceed to contest the final. The respective group runners-up and third placed nations play each other in consolation matches to decide third through sixth place in the final standings.

Matches are listed as local time in Nazaré, WEST (UTC+1)

=== Group A ===
Pos	Team	Pld	W	W+	WP	L	GF	GA	GD	Pts	Qualification
1	Russia	2	2	0	0	0	10	3	+7	6	Advance to the Final
2	England	2	1	0	0	1	6	7	–1	3	Third place play-off
3	Netherlands	2	0	0	0	2	6	12	–6	0	Fifth place play-off

5 July 2019
10:00

England	1–3	Russia
Kempson 23'	Report(ru)	13' Gorshkova; 25', 36' Cherniakova

Estádio do Viveiro
Referee: Jonathan Mallia (Malta)

6 July 2019
09:15

Russia	7–2	Netherlands
Silina 4'; Fedorova 5', 8', 14'; Miedema 17' (o.g.); Cherniakova 27'; Gorshkova 33'	Report(ru)	27', 30' Loth

Estádio do Viveiro
Referee: Saverio Bottalico (Italy)
6 July 2019
15:45

England	5–4	Netherlands
Clark 14', 31'; Kempson 18'; Barron 19'; James 30'	Report(ru)	11', 27', 28' Verschoor; 27' van Velsen

Estádio do Viveiro
Referee: Wilson Castanheira Soares (Portugal)

=== Group B ===
Pos	Team	Pld	W	W+	WP	L	GF	GA	GD	Pts	Qualification
1	Spain	2	1	1	0	0	10	6	+4	5	Advance to the Final
2	Switzerland	2	1	0	0	1	10	8	+2	3	Third place play-off
3	Czech Republic	2	0	0	0	2	5	11	–6	0	Fifth place play-off

5 July 2019
11:15

Spain	5–4 (a.e.t.)	Switzerland
Grueter 8' (o.g.); Morera 11'; C. Gonzalez 11'; Miras 24'; S. Gonzalez 39'	Report(ru)	11' Schenk; 19', 25' Bachmann; 27' Kuffer

Estádio do Viveiro
Referee: Emmanuel Vocale (Belgium)

6 July 2019
09:15

Czech Republic	3–6	Switzerland
Culova 4'; Folprechtova 7'; Jungova 20'	Report(ru)	5', 23' Schenk; 12', 16' Kalin; 22' Morger; 35' Vincenz

Pitch 2
Referee: Bogdan Balaban (Romania)
6 July 2019
17:00

Spain	5–2	Czech Republic
Morera 14', 24'; Asensio 17'; Mellado 22'; S. Gonzalez 27'	Report(ru)	16' Culova; 22' Pychova

Estádio do Viveiro
Referee: Malte Gerhardt (Germany)

== Play-offs ==
=== Fifth place play-off ===
7 July 2019
09:15

Netherlands	6–5	Czech Republic
Moudou 4', 17'; Drost 8', 20'; Van Der Flier 14'; van Velsen 19'	Report(ru)	5', 35' Pychova; 8' Pomijova; 20' Culova; 30' Slavikova

Estádio do Viveiro
Referee: Sergio Soares (Portugal)

=== Third place play-off ===
7 July 2019
10:30

Switzerland	6–5 (a.e.t.)	England
Bachmann 1', 39'; Grueter 4'; Schenk 10'; Kuffer 18'; Morger 32'	Report(ru)	2', 8' Clark; 16' James; 35' Kempson; 36' Hillier

Estádio do Viveiro
Referee: Malte Gerhardt (Germany)

=== Final ===
7 July 2019
18:15

Russia	3–2	Spain
Fedorova 22'; Cherniakova 23'; Gorshkova 25'	Report(ru)	27' (o.g.) Khutornaia; 34' (pen.) Martinez

Estádio do Viveiro
Referee: Francisco Henriques Costa (Portugal)

== Awards ==
After the final, the following awards were presented.

=== Winners trophy ===
2019 Women's Euro Beach Soccer Cup
Champions

Russia
Second Title

=== Individual awards ===
Top scorer(s)
(England) Molly Clark
(Russia) Anna Cherniakova
(Russia) Marina Fedorova
(Switzerland) Nathalie Schenk
(Switzerland) Eva Bachmann
4 goals
Best player
(Russia) Marina Fedorova
Best goalkeeper
(Russia) Viktoriia Silina

== Goalscorers ==
4 goals

- (England) Molly Clark
- (Russia) Anna Cherniakova
- (Russia) Marina Fedorova
- (Switzerland) Nathalie Schenk
- (Switzerland) Eva Bachmann

3 goals

- (Czech Republic) Veronika Pychova
- (Netherlands) Aaike Verschoor
- (Czech Republic) Michaela Culova
- (England) Sarah Kempson
- (Russia) Anastasiia Gorshkova
- (Spain) Carla Morera

2 goals

- (England) Gemma Hillier
- (England) Katie James
- (Netherlands) Celine van Velsen
- (Switzerland) Sandra Kalin
- (Switzerland) Pascale Kuffer
- (Netherlands) Nancy Loth
- (Netherlands) Chelly Drost
- (Switzerland) Andrea Morger
- (Netherlands) Bouchra Moudou
- (Spain) Carolina Gonzalez
- (Spain) Alba Mellado

1 goal

- (Netherlands) Tess Van Der Flier
- (Spain) Sara Gonzalez
- (Switzerland) Alina Grueter
- (Czech Republic) Martina Folprechtova
- (Russia) Viktoriia Silina
- (Czech Republic) Katerina Slavikova
- (Spain) Lorena Asensio
- (Spain) Jessica Miras
- (Switzerland) Fabiola Vincenz
- (Czech Republic) Barbora Pomijova
- (Czech Republic) Aneta Jungova

Own goals

- (Netherlands) Mariel Miedema (vs. Russia)
- (Russia) Veronika Khutornaia (vs. Spain)
- (Switzerland) Alina Grueter (vs. Spain)

== Final standings ==
Pos	Grp	Team	Pld	W	W+	WP	L	GF	GA	GD	Pts	Final result
1	A	Russia	3	3	0	0	0	13	5	+8	9	Champions
2	B	Spain	3	1	1	0	1	12	9	+3	5	Runners-up
3	B	Switzerland	3	1	1	0	1	16	13	+3	5	Third place
4	A	England	3	1	0	0	2	11	13	−2	3	Fourth place
5	A	Netherlands	3	1	0	0	2	12	17	−5	3	Fifth place
6	B	Czech Republic	3	0	0	0	3	10	17	−7	0	Sixth place

Source: BSWW
