= Lucy Quinn =

Irish footballer (born 1993)

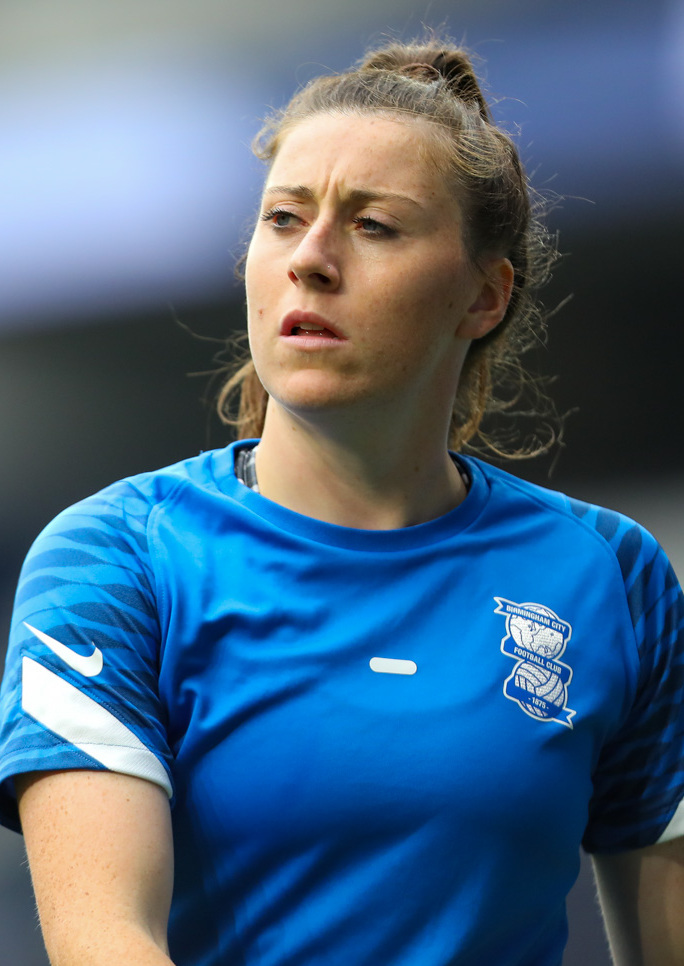
- Quinn with Birmingham City in 2021

Personal information
- Full name: Lucy Jane Quinn
- Date of birth: 29 September 1993 (age 33)
- Place of birth: Southampton, England
- Height: 1.68 m (5 ft 6 in)
- Position: Forward

Team information
- Current team: Sheffield United

Youth career
- Portsmouth

Senior career*
Years	Team	Apps	(Gls)
2010–2016	Portsmouth	136	(49)
2016–2017	Yeovil Town	13	(6)
2017–2019	Birmingham City	29	(2)
2019–2021	Tottenham Hotspur	34	(3)
2021–2026	Birmingham City	134	(22)
2026–	Sheffield United	5	(2)

International career^{‡}
2021–	Republic of Ireland	35	(6)
- * Club domestic league appearances and goals as of 13 October 2026 ‡ National team caps and goals as of After match on 13 October 2026

Lucy Jane Quinn (born 29 September 1993) is a professional footballer who plays as a forward for Women's Super League 2 club Sheffield United. Born in England, she is a member of the Republic of Ireland women's national team.

Quinn represented England Women U17 at the Euro 2017 Beach summer cup. She joined Birmingham City for a second time in 2021, having also played for Portsmouth, Yeovil Town and Tottenham Hotspur.

== Career ==
=== Yeovil Town ===
Growing up, Quinn studied GCSEs at Wildern Secondary School and later studied A levels at Itchen College in Southampton. Quinn signed with FA WSL 2 side Yeovil Town during the summer of 2016. She scored her first goal for the club during her debut – a 1–1 draw against Sheffield.

=== Birmingham City ===
In September 2017, it was announced Quinn had signed with Birmingham City. During a match against former league champions Manchester City, she scored the game-opening goal to lift Birmingham to a 1–0 lead within the first ten minutes.

=== Tottenham Hotspur ===
In July 2019, it was announced that Quinn had signed for Tottenham. She was part of the squad during Tottenham's debut season in the Women's Super League.

=== Birmingham City ===
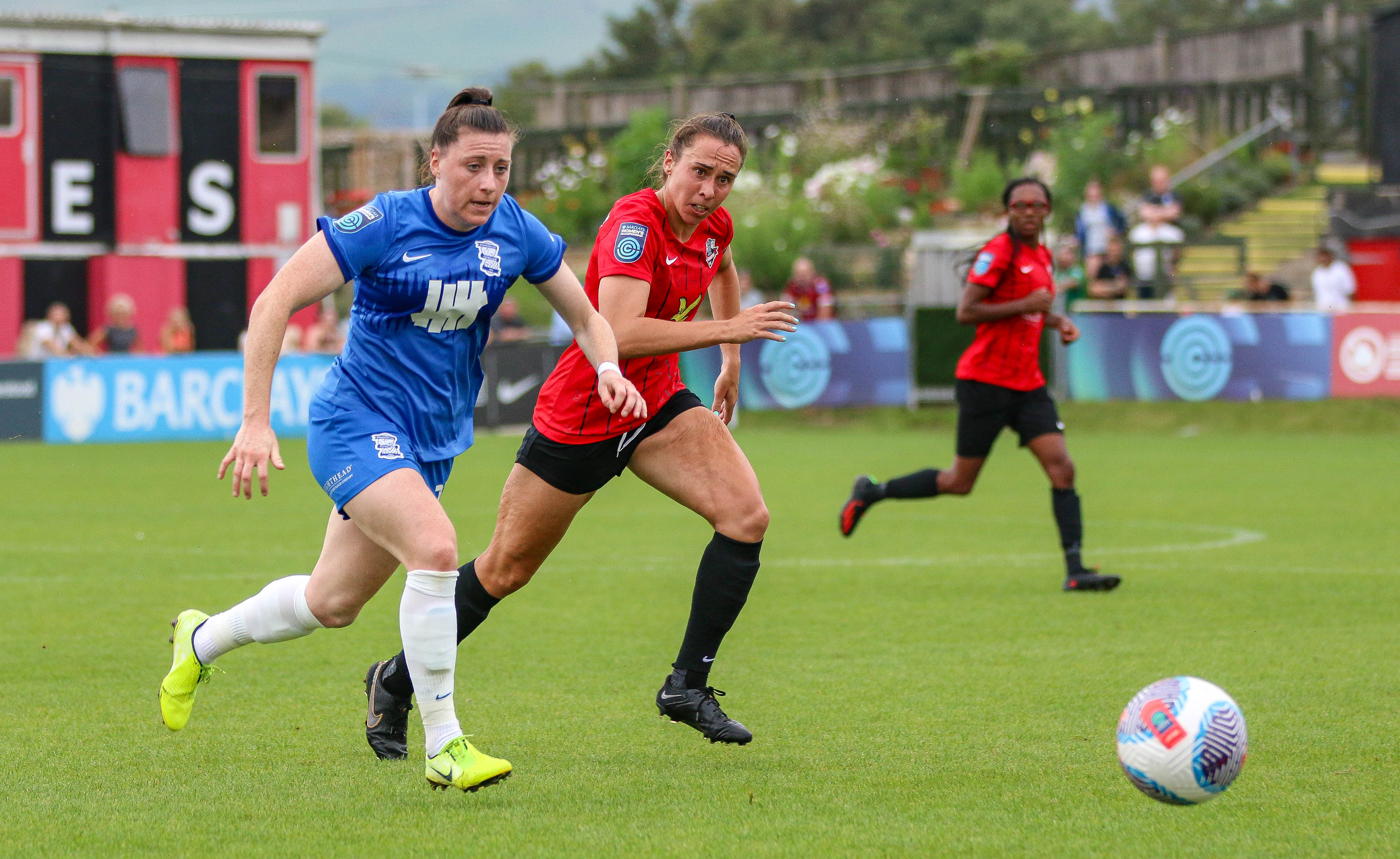
Quinn (left) with Birmingham in 2023

In 2021, Quinn signed with Birmingham, rejoining the club and saying that "Birmingham always had a special place in my heart." Quinn won the September 2024 Women's Championship Player of the Month award. On 15 July 2025, it was announced that Quinn had signed a one-year contract to extend their time with the club.

=== Sheffield United ===
On 22 July 2026, Quinn was announced at Sheffield United.

== International career ==
Quinn represented Great Britain at the 2017 World University Games where she won the golden boot award for most goals scored. The same year, she represented England at the 2017 Women's Euro Beach Soccer Cup, where she earned the best goalkeeper award.

In September 2021, Quinn received her Irish passport and FIFA approval to play for the Republic of Ireland women's national football team. Her first call-up was for a friendly game against Australia on 21 September 2021 at Tallaght Stadium. Quinn started Ireland's 3–2 win and was credited with creating an own goal in the 11th minute when her free kick deflected into the goal off Australia goalkeeper Mackenzie Arnold to give Ireland the lead: "I can absolutely claim the goal no matter what it goes down as. I had to do something to make the keeper have to work. So for me it's a debut goal, no one can take it away from me."

=== International appearances ===
Appearances and goals by national team and year
National team	Year	Apps	Goals
Republic of Ireland	2021	5	1
Republic of Ireland	2022	7	1
Republic of Ireland	2023	9	2
Republic of Ireland	2024	5	0
Republic of Ireland	2025	9	0
Republic of Ireland	2026	2	1
Total		35	6

=== International goals ===
Scores and results list Republic of Ireland's goals first. Score column indicates score after each Quinn goal. Updated as of 5 December 2023.

International goals scored by Lucy Quinn
No.	Cap	Date	Venue	Opponent	Score	Result	Competition	Ref.
1	1	21 September 2021	Tallaght Stadium, Dublin, Ireland	Australia	1-0	3-2	International Friendly	
2	5	30 November 2021	Tallaght Stadium, Dublin, Ireland	Georgia	3–0	11–0	2019 FIFA Women's World Cup qualification	
3	6	16 February 2022	La Manga Club Football Stadium, La Manga	Poland	1-1	2–1	2022 Pinatar Cup	
4	17	23 September 2023	Aviva Stadium, Dublin, Ireland	Northern Ireland	1–0	3–0	2023-24 UEFA Women's Nations League	
5	20	5 December 2023	Windsor Park, Belfast, Ireland	Northern Ireland	1-0	6-1	2023-24 UEFA Women's Nations League	
6	35	13 October 2026	Páirc Uí Chaoimh, Cork, Ireland	Kazakhstan	3-0	4-0	2027 World Cup qualification UEFA play-offs	

== Honours ==
Birmingham City

- Women's Super League 2: 2025–26

England beach soccer

- Euro Beach Soccer Cup: 2017

Individual

- World University Games Golden Boot: 2017
- Women's Euro Beach Soccer Cup Best Goalkeeper: 2017
- Birmingham City Goal of the Season: 2022–23
