= 2017 Women's Euro Beach Soccer Cup =

Tournament details
- Host country: Portugal
- Dates: 7 – 9 July
- Teams: 6 (from 1 confederation)
- Venue(s): 2 (in 1 host city)

Final positions
- Champions: England (1st title)
- Runners-up: Switzerland
- Third place: Netherlands
- Fourth place: Czech Republic

Tournament statistics
- Matches played: 9
- Goals scored: 53 (5.89 per match)
- Top scorer(s): (England) Gemma Hillier (5 goals)
- Best player(s): (Netherlands) Grytsje Van den Berg
- Best goalkeeper: (England) Lucy Quinn

The 2017 Women’s Euro Beach Soccer Cup was the second edition of the Women's Euro Beach Soccer Cup, an international, European beach soccer championship for women's national teams, organised annually by Beach Soccer Worldwide (BSWW). The event was revealed on April 21, 2017.

Six nations took part in a three day competition hosted in Nazaré, Portugal, between 7 and 9 July, alongside stage 2 of the men's 2017 Euro Beach Soccer League. Originally scheduled to take place in Sanxenxo, Spain, BSWW announced on June 1 the competition would be moved to Nazaré due to administrative issues.

Spain were the defending champions but failed to progress pass the group stage, ultimately finishing in fifth. The tournament was won by England, who claimed their maiden European crown. This was the first time an English side won a major beach soccer trophy in either a women's or a men's championship.

== Teams ==
All six teams from the inaugural edition returned, except for hosts Portugal, who were replaced by the Czech Republic.

- Czech Republic^{1}
- England
- Greece
- Netherlands
- Spain
- Switzerland

1. Teams making their debut

== Draw ==
The draw took place on June 20, 2017 at BSWW's headquarters in Barcelona. The six teams were split into two groups of three. Spain, as champions of the previous edition in 2016, were allocated to position A1 and Switzerland, as runners up in 2016, were allocated to B1. The other nations were then drawn to accompany them in the two groups.

Seeded nations	Unseeded nations
Spain (assigned to A1); Switzerland (assigned to B1)	Czech Republic; England; Greece; Netherlands

== Group stage ==
All matches took place at the Estádio do Viveiro at the Praia de Nazaré with a capacity of 1,600, other than the Switzerland v Czech Republic match which took place on an external pitch.

The teams competed in a round robin format. The winners of the groups proceeded to contest the final. The respective group runners-up and third placed nations played in consolation matches to decide third through sixth place in the final standings.

Matches are listed as local time in Nazaré, WEST (UTC+1)

=== Group A ===
Pos	Team	Pld	W	W+	WP	L	GF	GA	GD	Pts	Qualification
1	England	2	2	0	0	0	10	4	+6	6	Advance to the final
2	Netherlands	2	1	0	0	1	5	5	0	3	Play-offs
3	Spain	2	0	0	0	2	2	8	–6	0	Play-offs

7 July 2017
13:00

Spain	1–2	Netherlands
Soto 22'	Report	2', 25' Van den Berg

8 July 2017
11:15

England	4–3	Netherlands
Hillier 16', 29'; Clark 17'; Quinn 22'	Report	4', 7' De Bondt; 8' Ten Brinke

8 July 2017
19:30

Spain	1–6	England
Alegre 11'	Report	2', 28' Hillier; 18', 34' Clark; 22', 30' Kempson

=== Group B ===
Pos	Team	Pld	W	W+	WP	L	GF	GA	GD	Pts	Qualification
1	Switzerland	2	2	0	0	0	11	2	+9	6	Advance to the final
2	Czech Republic	2	1	0	0	1	4	7	–3	3	Play-offs
3	Greece	2	0	0	0	2	3	9	–6	0	Play-offs

7 July 2017
11:45

Switzerland	6–1	Greece
Steinemann 16', 20'; Heer 19', 22', 36'; Maurer 36'	Report	2' Potsiou

8 July 2017
10:00

Czech Republic	3–2	Greece
Folprechtova 13'; Navratilova 16'; Matejkova 26'	Report	25' Kossova; 36' Zdravkovic

8 July 2017
19:30

Switzerland	5–1	Czech Republic
Kehrli 2'; Maurer 6'; Morger 12'; Grueter 22'; Schenk 28'	Report	23' Matejkova

== Playoffs ==
=== Fifth place play-off ===
9 July 2017
10:30

Spain	9–1	Greece
Miro 5', 36'; Morera 6'; C. Gonzalez 6'; Soto 11', 16'; Asensio 15', 31'; Moreira 23'	Report	30' Melissou

=== Third place play-off ===
9 July 2017
11:45

Netherlands	1–0	Czech Republic
Van de Berg 23'	Report

=== Final ===
9 July 2017
13:00

England	4–3	Switzerland
Sievwright 4', 28'; Hillier 8'; Clark 9'	Report	2', 30' Birrfelder; 31' Schenk

== Awards ==
After the final, the following awards were presented.

=== Winners trophy ===
2017 Women's Euro Beach Soccer Cup
Champions

England
First Title

=== Individual awards ===
Top scorer
(England) Gemma Hillier
5 goals
Best player
(Netherlands) Grytsje Van den Berg
Best goalkeeper
(England) Lucy Quinn

== Goalscorers ==
5 goals

- (England) Gemma Hillier

4 goals

- (England) Molly Clark

3 goals

- (Spain) Maria Soto Bravo
- (Netherlands) Grytsje Van den Berg
- (Switzerland) Nicole Heer

2 goals

- (Netherlands) Joelle de Bondt
- (Spain) Andrea Miro Castro
- (Spain) Lorena Asensio
- (England) Shannon Sievwright
- (Switzerland) Ramona Birrfelder
- (Switzerland) Nathalie Schenk
- (Switzerland) Sandra Maurer
- (Czech Republic) Marketa Matejkova
- (England) Sarah Kempson
- (Switzerland) Franziska Steinemann

1 goal

- (Spain) Karen Moreira Sanchez
- (Netherlands) Marianne ten Brinke
- (Czech Republic) Martina Folprechtova
- (Spain) Carla Morera
- (Spain) Carolina González
- (Switzerland) Andrea Morger
- (Switzerland) Alina Grueter
- (Switzerland) Deborah Kehrli
- (England) Lucy Quinn
- (Greece) Dimitra Kossova
- (Greece) Maria Potsiou
- (Greece) Ionna Melissou
- (Greece) Suzana Zdravkovic
- (Czech Republic) Lucie Navratilova
- (Spain) Selene Alegre

== Final standings ==
Pos	Grp	Team	Pld	W	W+	WP	L	GF	GA	GD	Pts	Final result
1	A	England	3	3	0	0	0	14	7	+7	9	Champions
2	B	Switzerland	3	2	0	0	1	14	6	+8	6	Runners-up
3	A	Netherlands	3	2	0	0	1	6	5	+1	6	Third place
4	B	Czech Republic	3	1	0	0	2	4	8	−4	3	Fourth place
5	A	Spain	3	1	0	0	2	11	9	+2	3	Fifth place
6	B	Greece	3	0	0	0	3	4	18	−14	0	Sixth place
