= Pascale Küffer =

Swiss footballer

Personal information
- Date of birth: 13 December 1992 (age 33)
- Place of birth: Ins, Switzerland
- Height: 1.65 m (5 ft 5 in)
- Position: Goalkeeper

Team information
- Current team: FC Zurich

Pascale Küffer is a Swiss footballer who plays for the Swiss side FC Zurich.

== International career ==
Küffer has represented Switzerland at youth level at the 2011 UEFA Women's Under-19 Championship.
