= Carla Morera =

Spanish footballer (born 1995)

Personal information
- Full name: Carla Morera Rincón
- Date of birth: 17 March 1995 (age 31)
- Place of birth: Cerdanyola del Vallès, Spain
- Position: Defender

Team information
- Current team: INAC Kobe Leonessa
- Number: 21

Senior career*
Years	Team	Apps	(Gls)
2012–2016	Cerdanyola del Vallès		
2016–2019	Seagull		
2019–2024	Eibar	50	(4)
2024–	INAC Kobe		
- * Club domestic league appearances and goals as of 13:16, 31 October 2021 (UTC)

Carla Morera Rincón (born 17 March 1995) is a Spanish footballer who plays as a defender for Alavés.

== Club career ==
Morera started her career at Cerdanyola del Vallès.
