= Switzerland women's national beach soccer team =

Switzerland
- Nickname(s): Schweizer Frauen Beachsoccer Nati
- Association: Swiss Football Association
- Confederation: UEFA (Europe)
- Head coach: Franziska Steinemann
- Captain: Vanessa Meyer
- Most caps: Franziska Steinemann (20)
- FIFA code: SUI
First colours
Second colours

First international
- Switzerland 11–4 Germany (Basel, Switzerland; 4 June 2009)

Biggest win
- Switzerland 11–1 Germany (Basel, Switzerland; 17 August 2013)

Biggest defeat
- Spain 8-2 Switzerland (Catania, Italy; 2 September 2022); Switzerland 0–6 Russia (Nazaré, Portugal; 20 June 2021)

Euro Beach Soccer Cup
- Appearances: 2 (first in 2016)
- Best result: Runners-up (2016, 2017)

Switzerland women's national beach soccer team represents Switzerland in international women's beach soccer competitions and is controlled by the Swiss Football Association, the governing body of football in Switzerland. The team was created in 2008.

The Swiss team are currently the most active national women's side, having competed internationally every year since their first match in 2009 and having played over 20 matches during that time. Having only previously competed in friendlies and exhibition events, Switzerland Women subsequently debuted competitively in the first official women's event organised by Beach Soccer Worldwide (BSWW) in 2016, the Women's Euro Beach Soccer Cup. In both editions to date, the Swiss have finished runners-up.

The squad mostly comprises players who play in the Suzuki Swiss Beach Soccer Women-League.

== Current squad ==
As of July 2017 (Chosen for the 2017 Euro Beach Soccer Cup)

Note: Flags indicate national team as defined under FIFA eligibility rules; some limited exceptions apply. Players may hold more than one non-FIFA nationality.

No.	Pos.	Nation	Player
1	GK	(Switzerland) SUI	Alma Marti
2	DF	(Switzerland) SUI	Sandra Maurer
3	MF	(Switzerland) SUI	Andrea Morger
5	DF	(Switzerland) SUI	Vanessa Meyer (captain)
6	MF	(Switzerland) SUI	Daniela Plüss
7	DF	(Switzerland) SUI	Franziska Steinemann
8	DF	(Switzerland) SUI	Nathalie Schenk

No.	Pos.	Nation	Player
9	FW	(Switzerland) SUI	Alina Grueter
10	MF	(Switzerland) SUI	Nicole Heer
11	MF	(Switzerland) SUI	Milena Vujovic
14	FW	(Switzerland) SUI	Fabiola Vincenz
18	FW	(Switzerland) SUI	Livia Büchler
19	MF	(Switzerland) SUI	Ramona Birrfelder

Coach: Franziska Steinemann

== Competitive record ==
As of March 2018

=== Women's Euro Beach Soccer Cup ===
Year	Round	Result	Pld	W	W+	WP	L	GF	GA	GD
(Portugal) 2016	Final	Runners-up	3	1	1	0	1	13	9	+4
(Portugal) 2017	Final	Runners-up	3	2	0	0	1	14	6	+8
(Portugal) 2018	Third place play-off	Third place	3	2	0	0	1	15	13	+2
(Portugal) 2019	Third place play-off	Third place	3	1	1	0	1	16	13	+3
Total	0 titles	4/4	12	6	2	0	4	58	41	+17

=== Head-to-head records ===
Includes competitive and friendly matches.

Team	First	Last	Record	Win %
Germany	2009	2014	6–1	86%
Portugal	2010	2015	2–1	67%
Czech Republic	2011	2019	8–0	100%
Italy	2011	2011	1–0	100%
England	2014	2019	6–1	85.71%
Greece	2016	2017	2–0	100%
Spain	2016	2019	0–2	0%
Russia	2018	2018	0–1	0%
Netherlands	2018	2018	1–0	100%
Totals	2009	2019	26–6	81.25%

== See also ==
- Switzerland men's national beach soccer team
