= 2016 Women's Euro Beach Soccer Cup =

Tournament details
- Host country: Portugal
- Dates: 29 – 31 July
- Teams: 6 (from 1 confederation)
- Venue: 1 (in 1 host city)

Final positions
- Champions: Spain (1st title)
- Runners-up: Switzerland
- Third place: Portugal
- Fourth place: England

Tournament statistics
- Matches played: 9
- Goals scored: 68 (7.56 per match)
- Top scorer: (England) Molly Clark (6 goals)
- Best player: (Spain) Andrea Mirón
- Best goalkeeper: (Switzerland) Suzanne Stutz

The 2016 Women’s Euro Beach Soccer Cup was the inaugural edition of the international, European beach soccer championship for women's national teams. Having promoted women's friendlies and exhibition events since 2009, and hosting a men's version of the Euro Beach Soccer Cup since 1998, this was the first official competitive international tournament between Women's national squads to be organised by Beach Soccer Worldwide (BSWW).

Six nations took part in a three day competition hosted in Cascais, Portugal, between 29 and 31 July, alongside the men's 2016 Mundialito tournament.

The tournament was won by Spain.

== Teams ==
- Switzerland
- England
- Portugal
- Greece
- Netherlands
- Spain

== Group stage ==
The draw took place on 1 July 2016 at BSWW's headquarters in Barcelona.

=== Group A ===
Pos	Team	Pld	W	W+	WP	L	GF	GA	GD	Pts	Qualification
1	Spain	2	1	1	0	0	7	5	+2	5	Advanced to the final
2	Portugal	2	1	0	0	1	7	7	0	3	Play-offs
3	Netherlands	2	0	0	0	2	5	7	–2	0	Play-offs

29 July 2016
11:30

Netherlands	3–4	Portugal
Brinke; Van den Berg; De Pater	Report	R. Pereira (o.g.) De Hoek; A. Silva

30 July 2016
11:30

Portugal	3–4 (a.e.t.)	Spain
R. Pereira; Brasil; C. Pereira	Report	S. González; Asensio; C. Gonzalez

30 July 2016
17:00

Spain	3–2	Netherlands
Asensio; Miron	Report	Van der Schoor ?

=== Group B ===
Pos	Team	Pld	W	W+	WP	L	GF	GA	GD	Pts	Qualification
1	Switzerland	2	1	1	0	0	12	7	+5	5	Advanced to the final
2	England	2	1	0	0	1	9	8	+1	3	Play-offs
3	Greece	2	0	0	0	2	6	12	–6	0	Play-offs

29 July 2016
10:15

Greece	3–7	Switzerland
Mylona; Kossova; Tsimpoukaki	Report	Genovesi; Krysl; Franzi; Stutz; Imhasly; Meyer

30 July 2016
10:15

Switzerland	5–4 (a.e.t.)	England
Imhasly; Krysl; Maurer	Report	Rutherford; Widdowson; Hillier

30 July 2016
15:45

England	5–3	Greece
Clark; Quinn	Report	Mylona; Nikolaou

== Classification matches ==
=== Fifth place play-off ===
31 July 2016
09:00

Netherlands	7–0	Greece
Van der Schoor; Zech; Brinke; De Bondt; Saaltink	Report

=== Third place play-off ===
31 July 2016
11:30

England	6–6 (a.e.t.)	Portugal
Widdowson; Kempson; Quinn; Clark	Report	Gomes; C. Silva; A. Silva
Penalties
James (penalty missed); Kempson (penalty missed)	0–2	(penalty scored) Pereira; (penalty scored) Gomes

=== Final ===
31 July 2016
10:15

Switzerland	1–2	Spain
Meyer	Report	Alegre; C. Gonzalez

== Awards ==
After the final, the following awards were presented.

=== Winners' trophy ===
2016 Women's Euro Beach Soccer Cup
Champions

Spain
First Title

=== Individual awards ===
Top scorer
(England) Molly Clark
6 goals
Best player
(Spain) Andrea Mirón
Best goalkeeper
(Switzerland) Suzanne Stutz

== Goalscorers ==
Note that one Dutch goal is missing

6 goals

- (England) Molly Clark

4 goals

- (Netherlands) Marianne Van der Schoor

3 goals

- (Spain) Carolina Gonzalez
- (Greece) Konstantina Mylona
- (Switzerland) Adrienne Krysl
- (England) Jade Widdowson
- (England) Lucy Quinn
- (Portugal) Mélissa Gomes
- (Portugal) Ana Patricia Silva

2 goals

- (Netherlands) Marianne ten Brinke
- (Portugal) Regina Pereira
- (Spain) Lorena Asensio
- (Spain) Andrea Miron
- (Switzerland) Sandra Genovesi
- (Switzerland) Carmen Imhasly
- (Switzerland) Vanessa Meyer
- (Switzerland) Sandra Maurer
- (Portugal) Carla Silva

1 goal

- (Netherlands) Grytsje Van den Berg
- (Netherlands) Jennieke De Pater
- (Portugal) Sara Brasil
- (Spain) Sara González
- (Greece) Dimitra Kossova
- (Greece) Efstathia Tsimpoukaki
- (Switzerland) Franziska Steinemann
- (Switzerland) Susanne Stutz
- (England) Leeta Rutherford
- (England) Gemma Hillier
- (Greece) Eirini Nikolaou
- (Netherlands) Eveline Zech
- (Netherlands) Joelle De Bondt
- (Netherlands) Stef Saaltink
- (England) Sarah Kempson
- (Portugal) Claudia Pereira
- (Spain) Selene Alegre

Own goals

- (Netherlands) Aafke De Hoek (vs. Portugal)

== Final standings ==
Pos	Grp	Team	Pld	W	W+	WP	L	GF	GA	GD	Pts	Final result
1	A	Spain	3	2	1	0	0	9	6	+3	8	Champions
2	B	Switzerland	3	1	1	0	1	13	9	+4	5	Runners-up
3	A	Portugal	3	1	0	1	1	13	13	0	4	Third place
4	B	England	3	1	0	0	2	15	14	+1	3	Fourth place
5	A	Netherlands	3	1	0	0	2	12	7	+5	3	Fifth place
6	B	Greece	3	0	0	0	3	6	19	−13	0	Sixth place
