= Spain women's national beach soccer team =

Spain
- Association: Royal Spanish Football Federation
- Confederation: UEFA (Europe)
- Head coach: Joaquín Alonso
- FIFA code: ESP
First colours
Second colours

First international
- Portugal 3–4 Spain (Cascais, Portugal; 30 July 2016)

Biggest defeat
- Spain 1–6 England (Názare, Portugal; 8 July 2017)

Euro Beach Soccer League
- Appearances: 6 (first in 2021)
- Best result: (gold) Champions (2022, 2023, 2026)

Euro Beach Soccer Cup
- Appearances: 4 (first in 2016)
- Best result: (gold) Champions (2016)
Medal record
Euro Beach Soccer
Gold medal – first place	2016	Euro Beach Soccer in Cascais

The Spain women's national beach soccer team represents Spain in international women's beach soccer competitions and is controlled by the RFEF, the governing body for football in Spain.

== Competitive records ==
=== Euro Beach Soccer Cup ===
The Taça Europeia de Futebol de Praia Feminino (Women's Euro Beach Soccer Cup) is a European invitational tournament for national teams in women's beach soccer hosted by the Portuguese Football Federation. The first edition was held in Cascais (a coastal town near Lisbon) in 2016.

Year	Result	Matches	Wins	Draws	Losses	GF	GA
(Portugal) 2016	Champions	3	3	0	0	9	6
(Portugal) 2017	Fifth place	3	1	0	2	11	9
(Portugal) 2018	Runners-up	3	2	0	1	12	2
(Portugal) 2019	Runners-up	3	2	0	1	12	9

== Results and fixtures ==
Spain women's national beach soccer team results

The following matches were played or are scheduled to be played by the national team in the current or upcoming seasons.

Win Draw Loss

Date	Venue	Opponent	Result	Scorers	Phase	Competition
30 July 2016 (11:30 a.m.)	(Portugal) Cascais	Portugal	4–3	Carolina González, Sara Tui, Carla Morera	Group stage	2016 Euro Beach Soccer Cup
30 July 2016 (15:30 p.m.)	(Portugal) Cascais	Netherlands	3–2	Lorena Asensio, Andrea Mirón "Polli"	Group stage	2016 Euro Beach Soccer Cup
31 July 2016 (11:30 a.m.)	(Portugal) Cascais	Switzerland	2–1	Selene Alegre, Carolina González	Final	2016 Euro Beach Soccer Cup
7 July 2017 (13:00 p.m.)	(Portugal) Nazaré	Netherlands	1–2	Soto	Group Stage	2017 Euro Beach Soccer Cup
8 July 2017 (19:30 p.m.)	(Portugal) Nazaré	England	1–6	Alegre	Group Stage	2017 Euro Beach Soccer Cup
9 July 2017 (11:30 a.m.)	(Portugal) Nazaré	Greece	9–1	Mirón, Morera, González, Soto, Asensio, Moreira	Fifth place match	2017 Euro Beach Soccer Cup

== Players ==
=== Current squad ===
Head coach: (Spain) Joaquín Alonso

Caps and goals as of 15 July 2017.

No.	Pos.	Player	Date of birth (age)	Caps	Goals	Club
	GK	(Spain) Maríajo	8 August 1984 (age 42)	6	0	(Royal Spanish Football Federation) RCD Espanyol
	GK	(Spain) Laura Gallego	6 March 1990 (age 36)	4	0	(Royal Spanish Football Federation) Lorca Deportiva
	DF	(Spain) Andrea Mirón "Polli"	17 June 1991 (age 35)	6	4	(Portuguese Football Federation) SC Braga
	DF	(Spain) Carla Morena	17 March 1995 (age 31)	6	2	(Royal Spanish Football Federation) CE Seagull
	MF	(Spain) Lorena Asensio	17 July 1988 (age 38)	6	3	(Royal Spanish Football Federation) Torreblanca Melilla F.S.
	MF	(Spain) Jessica Higueras	19 June 1993 (age 33)	3	0	(Royal Spanish Football Federation) Joventut Almassora
	MF	(Spain) Karen Moreira	28 August 1987 (age 39)	3	1	(Royal Spanish Football Federation) FVPR El Olivo
	FW	(Spain) Selene Alegre	30 May 1994 (age 32)	6	2	(Royal Spanish Football Federation) CFF Cáceres
	FW	(Spain) Carolina González	31 December 1991 (age 34)	6	4	(Royal Spanish Football Federation) Sporting Huelva
	FW	(Spain) María Soto	14 February 1989 (age 37)	3	3	(Royal Spanish Football Federation) Torreblanca Melilla F.S.

=== Recent call-ups ===
The following players were named to a squad in the last twelve months.

Pos.	Player	Date of birth (age)	Caps	Goals	Club	Latest call-up
DF	(Spain) Eva María Bermúdez	8 October 1978 (age 47)	3	0	(Spain) FS Moaña	Euro Beach Soccer Cup 2016
MF	(Spain) Sara Tui	23 May 1989 (age 37)	3	1	(Spain) UD Granadilla Tenerife Sur	Euro Beach Soccer Cup 2016
FW	(Spain) Carmen María Alegre	4 December 1989 (age 36)	3	0	(Spain) Rayo Vallecano	Euro Beach Soccer Cup 2016

== See also ==
- Spain national beach soccer team
- Spain women's national football team
- Spain women's national futsal team
