= Sara González (footballer) =

Spanish footballer (born 1989)

Sara Tui
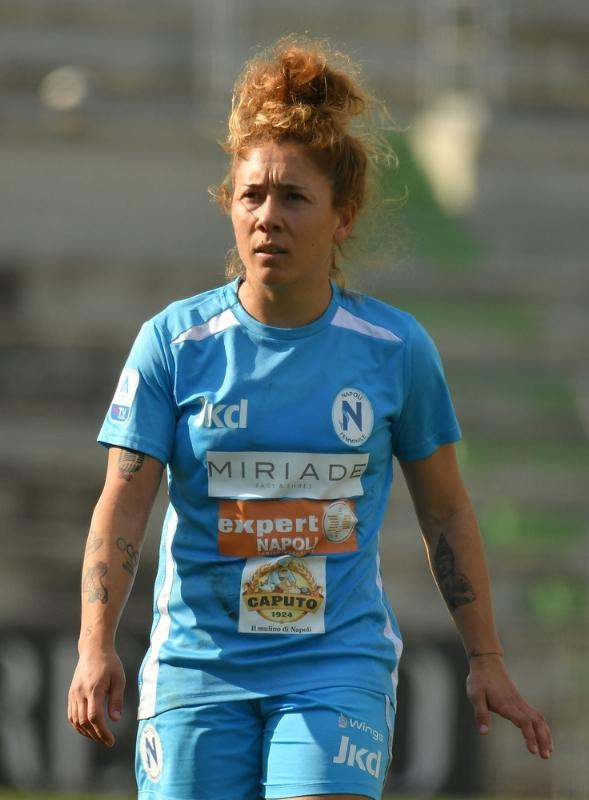

Personal information
- Full name: Sara González Rodríguez
- Date of birth: 23 May 1989 (age 37)
- Place of birth: Tui, Spain
- Height: 1.59 m (5 ft 3 in)
- Position: Central midfielder

Team information
- Current team: Ternana
- Number: 8

Senior career*
| Years | Team | Apps | (Gls) |
| 2004–2006 | Arousana | | |
| 2006–2007 | Pontevedra | | |
| 2007–2008 | L'Estartit | | |
| 2008–2009 | Tomiño | | |
| 2009–2015 | El Olivo | | |
| 2015–2019 | Granadilla | 103 | (10) |
| 2019–2021 | Madrid CFF | 39 | (4) |
| 2021–2023 | Napoli | 46 | (3) |
| 2023– | Ternana | | |

International career^{‡}
| 2007–08 | Galicia | 2 | (0) |
| 2007–08 | Spain U19 | 6 | (0) |
- * Club domestic league appearances and goals as of 17 September 2023 ‡ National team caps and goals as of 20:04, 18 September 2020 (UTC)

Sara González Rodríguez (born 23 May 1989), known as Sara Tui, is a Spanish footballer who plays as a central midfielder for Italian Serie B club Ternana.

== Club career ==
Tui started her career at Arousana and then later played at Pontevedra, L'Estartit, El Olivo and Granadilla. Tui joined Madrid CFF in 2019. After two seasons at Madrid CFF, she transferred to Italian club Napoli, which was the first time that Tui had signed for a club outside of Spain. She played in the opening game of the Serie A season, a 3–0 defeat to Inter Milan. After two subsequent seasons at Napoli, she signed for Serie B team Ternana.

== International career ==
As a junior international Tui played the 2008 U-19 European Championship.

== Personal life and beach soccer career ==
Tui enjoys drawing in her spare time. She also plays beach soccer. She has been called up to the Spain national beach soccer team.
