= England women's national beach soccer team =

National sports team

England
- Nickname(s): "Three Lionesses", "The Lionesses"
- Association: England Beach Soccer Ltd
- Confederation: UEFA (Europe)
- Head coach: Molly Barron-Clark
- Captain: Rebecca Barron-Clark
- FIFA code: ENG
- BSWW ranking: 4
First colours
Second colours

First international
- England 2–6 Switzerland (Manchester, England; 20 June 2014)

Biggest win
- England 8–1 Czech Republic (Ryde, England; 30 June 2018)

Biggest defeat
- England 2–14 Spain (Nazaré, Portugal; 11 September 2024)

Euro Beach Soccer Cup
- Appearances: 4 (first in 2016)
- Best result: Winners (2017)

The England Women's National Beach Soccer team represents England in international women's beach soccer competitions and is controlled by England Beach Soccer Ltd — independent of the governing body of football in England, The Football Association. The team was created in 2012, winning their first trophy, the Women's Euro Beach Soccer Cup, in 2017.

In 2019, the team qualified for the World Beach Games where they represented Great Britain, winning the silver medal.

== Current squad ==
As of November 2024 (Chosen for the 2024 NEOM Beach Games)

Note: Flags indicate national team as defined under FIFA eligibility rules; some limited exceptions apply. Players may hold more than one non-FIFA nationality.

| No. | Pos. | Nation | Player |
|---|---|---|---|
| 1 | GK | ENG | Chloe Traves |
| 13 | MF | ENG | Chloe Marshall |
| 4 | FW | ENG | Alicia Povey |
| 8 | DF | ENG | Rebecca Barron-Clark (captain) |
| 9 | MF | ENG | Karima Elouath |
| 11 | MF | ENG | Sara Dick |
| 13 | GK | ENG | Katie Scadding |
| 14 | MF | ENG | Jazz Povey |
| 16 | FW | ENG | Chloe Fisher |
| 17 | MF | ENG | Nicole Evans |
| 19 | MF | ENG | Alisha Buckingham |

== Competitive record ==
=== Women's Euro Beach Soccer Cup ===
| Year | Round | Result | Pld | W | W+ | WP | L | GF | GA | GD |
|---|---|---|---|---|---|---|---|---|---|---|
| (Portugal) 2016 | Third place play-off | Fourth Place | 3 | 1 | 0 | 0 | 2 | 15 | 14 | +1 |
| (Portugal) 2017 | Final | Champions | 3 | 3 | 0 | 0 | 0 | 14 | 7 | +7 |
| (Portugal) 2018 | Third place play-off | Fourth Place | 3 | 1 | 0 | 0 | 2 | 8 | 12 | –4 |
| (Portugal) 2019 | Third place play-off | Fourth Place | 3 | 1 | 0 | 0 | 2 | 11 | 13 | –2 |
| Total | 1 title | 4/4 | 12 | 6 | 0 | 0 | 6 | 48 | 46 | +2 |

=== World Beach Games ===
| Year | Round | Result | Pld | W | W+ | WP | L | GF | GA | GD |
represented as Great Britain
| (Qatar) 2019 | Final | Silver Medal | 5 | 4 | 0 | 0 | 1 | 22 | 15 | +7 |
| Total | 0 titles | 1/1 | 5 | 4 | 0 | 0 | 1 | 22 | 15 | +7 |

== Results and fixtures ==
=== By year ===
The team's first international match took place on 20 June 2014, as part of ITV's Fever Pitch, a companion to the 2014 FIFA World Cup.

==== 2012 ====
| 22 August 2012 Friendly | Isle of Wight | 2–8* | England | Ryde, England |
| 19:00 | | Report |

==== 2014 ====
| 20 June 2014 Friendly | England | 2–6 | Switzerland | Manchester, England |
| 19:00 | | Report |

| 23 July 2014 3-Nation Tournament | Switzerland | 9–5 | England | Espinho, Portugal |

| 24 July 2014 3-Nation Tournament | Portugal | 5–2 | England | Espinho, Portugal |

==== 2015 ====
| 21 August 2015 Friendly | Switzerland | 6–4 | England | Arosa, Switzerland |

==== 2016 ====
| 30 July 2016 2016 Euro Beach Soccer Cup | Switzerland | 5–4 (a.e.t.) | England | Carcavelos, Portugal |

| 30 July 2016 2016 Euro Beach Soccer Cup | England | 5–3 | Greece | Carcavelos, Portugal |

| 31 July 2016 2016 Euro Beach Soccer Cup, 3rd place | Portugal | 6–6 (a.e.t.) (2–0 p) | England | Carcavelos, Portugal |

==== 2017 ====
| 8 July 2017 2017 Euro Beach Soccer Cup | England | 4–3 | Netherlands | Nazaré, Portugal |

| 8 July 2017 2017 Euro Beach Soccer Cup | Spain | 1–6 | England | Nazaré, Portugal |

| 9 July 2017 2017 Euro Beach Soccer Cup, Final | England | 4–3 | Switzerland | Nazaré, Portugal |

==== 2018 ====
| 30 June 2018 Friendly | England | 8–1 | Czech Republic | Ryde, England |

| 1 July 2018 Friendly | England | 8–4 | Czech Republic | Ryde, England |

| 6 July 2018 2018 Euro Beach Soccer Cup, Group stage | England | 5–2 | Czech Republic | Nazaré, Portugal |
| | | Report |

| 7 July 2018 2018 Euro Beach Soccer Cup, Group stage | England | 0–4 | Spain | Nazaré, Portugal |
| | | Report |

| 8 July 2018 2018 Euro Beach Soccer Cup, 3rd place match | Switzerland | 6–3 | England | Nazaré, Portugal |
| | | Report |

==== 2019 ====
| 9 May 2019 2019 World Beach Games qualifiers | England | 4–8 | Czech Republic | Salou, Spain |
| 09:45 | | Report |

| 9 May 2019 2019 World Beach Games qualifiers | Spain | 5–5 (a.e.t.) (0–1 p) | England | Salou, Spain |
| 17:15 | | Report |

| 11 May 2019 2019 World Beach Games qualifiers | Switzerland | 0–3 | England | Salou, Spain |
| 14:45 | | Report |

| 12 May 2019 2019 World Beach Games qualifiers | England | 4–3 | Russia | Salou, Spain |
| 14:45 | | Report |

| 5 July 2019 2019 Euro Beach Soccer Cup, Group stage | England | 1–3 | Russia | Nazaré, Portugal |
| 10:00 | Kempson 23' | Report(ru) | 13' Gorshkova; 25', 36' Cherniakova | Stadium: Estádio do Viveiro; Referee: Jonathan Mallia (Malta) |

| 6 July 2019 2019 Euro Beach Soccer Cup, Group stage | England | 5–4 | Netherlands | Nazaré, Portugal |
| 15:45 | Clark 14', 31'; Kempson 18'; Barron 19'; James 30' | Report(ru) | 11', 27', 28' Verschoor; 27' van Velsen | Stadium: Estádio do Viveiro; Referee: Wilson Castanheira Soares (Portugal) |

| 7 July 2019 2019 Euro Beach Soccer Cup, 3rd place match | Switzerland | 6–5 (a.e.t.) | England | Nazaré, Portugal |
| 10:30 | Bachmann 1', 39'; Grueter 4'; Schenk 10'; Kuffer 18'; Morger 32' | Report(ru) | 2', 8' Clark; 16' James; 35' Kempson; 36' Hillier | Stadium: Estádio do Viveiro; Referee: Malte Gerhardt (Germany) |

| 11 October 2019 2019 World Beach Games, Group stage | Paraguay | 4–5 | Great Britain | Doha, Qatar |
| 15:00 | Godoy 20', 29', 29'; Mora 33' | Report(ru) | 16' Hillier; 24' Kempson; 25', 28' Clark; 36' Haughton | Stadium: Pitch 1, Katara beach Referee: José Cortez (Mexico) |

| 13 October 2019 2019 World Beach Games, Group stage | Great Britain | 5–2 | United States | Doha, Qatar |
| 18:00 | Kempson 1', 21'; Short 17', 19'; Hillier 29' | Report(ru) | 18' Sunseri-Warp; 26' Quigley | Stadium: Stadium, Katara beach |

| 14 October 2019 2019 World Beach Games, Group stage | Great Britain | 4–1 | Russia | Doha, Qatar |
| 15:00 | Bazan 8'; Kempson 8'; Hillier 9'; Martin 16' | Report(ru) | 14' Petrova | Stadium: Stadium, Katara beach |

| 15 October 2019 2019 World Beach Games, Semi-finals | Great Britain | 6–5 | Brazil | Doha, Qatar |
| 16:00 | Kempson 9', 35'; Martin 10', 29', 35' (pen.); Hillier 28' | Report(ru) | 3', 26' Nayara; 3' Adri; 10' Barboza; 12' (pen.) Lorena | Stadium: Stadium, Katara beach |

| 16 October 2019 2019 World Beach Games, Gold medal match | Great Britain | 2–3 | Spain | Doha, Qatar |
| 19:00 | Clark 6'; Barron 28' | Report(ru) | 6', 7' Asensio; 9' Fresneda | Stadium: Stadium, Katara beach |

*unofficial opposition

=== Head-to-head records ===
Includes competitive and friendly matches and those as Great Britain.

| Team | First | Last | Record | Win % |
|---|---|---|---|---|
| Switzerland | 2014 | 2019 | 2–6 | 25% |
| Portugal | 2014 | 2016 | 0–2 | 0% |
| Greece | 2016 | 2016 | 1–0 | 100% |
| Netherlands | 2017 | 2019 | 2–0 | 100% |
| Spain | 2017 | 2019 | 2–2 | 50% |
| Czech Republic | 2018 | 2019 | 3–1 | 75% |
| Russia | 2019 | 2019 | 2–1 | 67% |
| Paraguay | 2019 | 2019 | 1–0 | 100% |
| United States | 2019 | 2019 | 1–0 | 100% |
| Brazil | 2019 | 2019 | 1–0 | 100% |
| Totals | 2014 | 2019 | 15–12 | 56% |
