= Beach soccer at the European Games =

Beach Soccer at the European Games
- Organising bodies: EOC; BSWW
- Region: Europe (UEFA)

Men's event
- EG event since: 2015; 11 years ago
- Number of teams: 8
- Current champions: Switzerland (1st title)
- Most successful team(s): Russia; Portugal; Switzerland (1 title each)

Women's event
- EG event since: 2023; 3 years ago
- Number of teams: 6
- Current champions: Spain (1st title)
- Most successful team(s): Spain (1 title)

Beach Soccer has been part of each edition of the European Games (EG) – a quadrennial, multi-sport event – since the inaugural edition in 2015 as a men's sport, and since the third edition in 2023 as a women's sport. The competition is under the direction of the European Olympic Committees (EOCs); beach soccer's governing bodies (FIFA and UEFA) are represented by Beach Soccer Worldwide (BSWW) at the Games.

== Men's tournament ==
Eight teams take part. The hosts qualify automatically; of the most recent edition of the Euro Beach Soccer League (EBSL), the top six teams of the Superfinal and winners of the Promotion Final also qualify. To participate, nations must be members of both the EOCs and UEFA.

Portugal and Switzerland are most successful nations having won a total of two medals, including one gold each.

=== Results ===
Year	Location	Gold medal match			Bronze medal match		
Year	Location	Gold medalists	Score	Silver medalists	Bronze medalists	Score	Fourth place
2015 details	Baku, Azerbaijan	Russia	3–2	Italy	Portugal	6–5	Switzerland
2019 details	Minsk, Belarus	Portugal	8–3	Spain	Switzerland	5–4	Ukraine
2023 details	Kraków, Poland	Switzerland	5–2	Italy	Spain	5–5 (a.e.t.) (2–0 p)	Portugal

=== Performance ===
==== Medal table ====
Rank	Nation	Gold	Silver	Bronze	Total
1	Portugal (POR)	1	0	1	2
1	Switzerland (SUI)	1	0	1	2
3	Russia (RUS)	1	0	0	1
4	Italy (ITA)	0	2	0	2
5	Spain (ESP)	0	1	1	2
Totals (5 entries)		3	3	3	9

==== All-time top goalscorers ====
As of 2023

The following table shows the all-time goalscorers (minimum 10 goals).

Rank	Player	Team	Goals	Notes
1	Dejan Stankovic	Switzerland	25	2023 top scorer (11 goals)
2	Gabriele Gori	Italy	18	2019 top scorer (11 goals)
3	Léo Martins	Portugal	14	
4	Chiky Ardil	Spain	13	
4	Noël Ott	Switzerland	13	
4	Emmanuele Zurlo	Italy	13	
7	Belchior	Portugal	11	2015 top scorer (8 goals)
8	Llorenç Gómez	Spain	10	
8	Bê Martins	Portugal	10	
8	Antonio Mayor	Spain	10	
8	Jordan Santos	Portugal	10	

Sources: 2015, 2019, 2023.

==== Overall standings ====
As of 2023

Pos	Team	App	Pld	W	W+	WP	L	GF	GA	GD	Pts	PPG
1	Portugal	3	15	9	2	0	4	78	51	+27	31	2.07
2	Italy	3	15	8	1	0	6	72	57	+15	26	1.73
3	Spain	3	15	7	1	2	5	69	58	+11	25	1.67
4	Switzerland	3	15	7	1	1	6	77	59	+18	24	1.60
5	Ukraine	3	15	6	0	1	8	58	63	–5	19	1.27
6	Russia	2	10	5	0	1	4	38	34	+4	16	1.60
7	Belarus	1	5	2	0	1	2	24	20	+4	7	1.40
8	Azerbaijan	2	10	1	1	0	8	28	49	–21	5	0.50
9	Poland	1	5	1	0	0	4	18	25	–7	3	0.60
10	Hungary	1	5	1	0	0	4	14	21	–7	3	0.60
11	Moldova	1	5	1	0	0	4	23	31	–8	3	0.60
12	Romania	1	5	0	0	0	5	8	39	–31	0	0.00

Key: Appearances App / Won in normal time W = 3 points / Won in extra-time W+ = 2 points / Won on penalty shoot-out WP = 1 point / Lost L = 0 points / Points per game PPG

==== Appearances & performance timeline ====
Key

- G – Gold medalists
- S – Silver medalists
- B – Bronze medalists
- 4th...8th — Fourth to eighth place
- × — Did not qualify
- ×× — Barred from entering
- – Hosts
- Apps — Total appearances

Year Team	2015 (Azerbaijan) (8)	2019 (Belarus) (8)	2023 (Poland) (8)	Apps /3
Azerbaijan	8th	×	5th	2
Belarus	×	7th	×	1
Hungary	7th	×	×	1
Italy	S	5th	S	3
Moldova	×	×	6th	1
Poland	×	×	8th	1
Portugal	B	G	4th	3
Romania	×	8th	×	1
Russia	G	6th	××	2
Spain	5th	S	B	3
Switzerland	4th	B	G	3
Ukraine	6th	4th	7th	3
12 nations

== Women's tournament ==
Six teams take part. The hosts qualify automatically; of the most recent edition of the Women's Euro Beach Soccer League (WEBSL), the top five teams of the Superfinal qualify. To participate, nations must be members of both the EOCs and UEFA. For the 2023 edition, England finished in one of the qualification spots via the WEBSL, but because England does not have an independent EOC, they could not compete at the Games and so were replaced by the Czech Republic.

=== Results ===
Year	Location	Gold medal match			Bronze medal match		
Year	Location	Gold medalists	Score	Silver medalists	Bronze medalists	Score	Fourth place
2023 details	Kraków, Poland	Spain	2–2 (a.e.t.) (5–3 p)	Ukraine	Portugal	2–2 (a.e.t.) (3–0 p)	Poland

=== Performance ===
==== Medal table ====
Rank	Nation	Gold	Silver	Bronze	Total
1	Spain (ESP)	1	0	0	1
2	Ukraine (UKR)	0	1	0	1
3	Portugal (POR)	0	0	1	1
Totals (3 entries)		1	1	1	3

==== Overall standings ====
As of 2023

Pos	Team	App	Pld	W	W+	WP	L	GF	GA	GD	Pts	PPG
1	Spain	1	4	2	0	2	0	11	8	+3	8	2.00
2	Portugal	1	4	2	0	1	1	10	7	+3	7	1.75
3	Ukraine	1	4	2	0	0	2	11	10	+1	6	1.50
4	Poland	1	4	1	0	0	3	10	8	+2	3	0.75
5	Italy	1	3	0	1	0	2	4	4	0	2	0.67
6	Czech Republic	1	3	0	0	0	3	4	13	–9	0	0.00

Key: Appearances App / Won in normal time W = 3 points / Won in extra-time W+ = 2 points / Won on penalty shoot-out WP = 1 point / Lost L = 0 points / Points per game PPG

==== Appearances & performance timeline ====
Key

- G – Gold medalists
- S – Silver medalists
- B – Bronze medalists
- 4th...6th — Fourth to sixth place
- × — Did not qualify
- ×× — Barred from entering
- – Hosts
- Apps — Total appearances

Year Team	2023 (Poland) (8)	Apps /1
Czech Republic	6th	1
Italy	5th	1
Poland	4th	1
Portugal	B	1
Spain	G	1
Ukraine	S	1
6 nations

== See also ==
- Beach soccer at the African Beach Games
- Beach soccer at the Asian Beach Games
- Beach soccer at the South American Beach Games
