= 2024 Women's Euro Beach Soccer League =

Tournament details
- Host countries: Portugal; Italy
- Dates: 30 August – 15 September
- Teams: 9 (from 1 confederation)
- Venue: 3 (in 2 host cities)

Final positions
- Champions: Poland (1st title)
- Runners-up: Portugal
- Third place: Spain
- Fourth place: Italy

Tournament statistics
- Matches played: 32
- Goals scored: 197 (6.16 per match)

The 2024 Women's Euro Beach Soccer League was the fourth edition of the Women's Euro Beach Soccer League (WEBSL). It is the annual, premier competition in European beach soccer contested between women's national teams, succeeding the Women's Euro Beach Soccer Cup (2016–19). Organised by Beach Soccer Worldwide (BSWW), it is the women's version of the men's long-running Euro Beach Soccer League, which began in 1998.

The league consisted of two phases: a single round of fixtures comprising the regular season, which determined the seedings for the playoff event, the Superfinal, in which the teams then directly contested the league title, with the winners becoming WEBSL champions.

Spain were the two-time defending champions, but lost in the semifinals to Portugal. The title was won by Poland, who claimed their first WEBSL title.

== Teams ==
Nine teams enter this season.^{[a]} Italy enter straight into the Superfinal as hosts.

No teams make their debut this season. Switzerland return after a two-season absence.

The numbers in parentheses show the European ranking of each team prior to the start of the season, out of 10 nations.

- Spain (1st)
- England (2nd)
- Portugal (3rd)
- Ukraine (4th)
- Czech Republic (5th)
- Italy (6th)
- Poland (7th)
- Netherlands (8th)
- Switzerland (10th)

Notes
a: In accordance with sanctions imposed by FIFA and UEFA in response to the Russian invasion of Ukraine, the 2021 champions, Russia, have been suspended from participating in the competition since 2022.

== Regular season (Nazaré, 30 August – 1 September) ==
Matches are listed as local time in Nazaré, WEST (UTC+1) and are those scheduled; actual kick-off times may differ somewhat.

All matches took place at the Estádio do Viveiro – Jordan Santos on Praia de Nazaré (Nazaré Beach).

All teams qualify for the Superfinal; the final standings of the regular season event are used to determine the seedings for the Superfinal.

=== Draw ===
The draw to split the eight participating teams into two groups of four took place on 8 August.

Portugal, as hosts, were assigned to the head of Group A, and Spain, as the defending champions, were assigned to the head of Group B. The other six teams were split into three pots of two based on their final placement in the 2023 WEBSL, in order from the highest placing teams placed in Pot 1, down to the lowest placed in Pot 3. From each pot, one team was drawn into Group A and the other team was drawn into Group B.

=== Group stage ===
Key:	Event winners /	(H) Hosts

==== Group 1 ====
Pos	Team	Pld	W	W+	WP	L	GF	GA	GD	Pts
1	Portugal (H)	3	2	0	0	1	9	3	+7	6
2	Poland	3	2	0	0	1	9	5	+4	6
3	Ukraine	3	1	0	1	1	6	5	+1	4
4	England	3	0	0	0	3	3	14	–11	0

30 August 2024	Poland	3–1	Ukraine
12:45	Suskiewicz 7'; Świt 16'; Matusiak 28'	Report	Skybina 18'	Referee: Sergio Gomes (Portugal)

30 August 2024	England	1–5	Portugal
16:45	Fisher 28'	Report	Jamila 6'; Carolina 13', 24'; Beatriz 22'; Inês C. 31'	Referee: Vladimir Tashkov (Bulgaria)

31 August 2024	Poland	5–1	England
12:45	Banaszkiewicz 1'; Martin 4' (o.g.); Sudyk 8'; Świt 12'; Cykman 22'	Report	Fisher 27'	Referee: Gustavo Barros (Portugal)

31 August 2024	Portugal	1–1 (a.e.t.) (2–4 p)	Ukraine
16:45	Marta 36'	Report	Kostiuk 19'	Referee: Davide Innaurato (Italy)

1 September 2024	Ukraine	4–1	England
12:45	Terekh 2', 10'; Kostiuk 4'; Klipachenko 13'	Report	Fisher 20'	Referee: Jordy Vermeire (Belgium)

1 September 2024	Portugal	3–1	Poland
16:45	Ferreira 11'; Inês C. 21'; Flores 29'	Report	Świt 3'	Referee: Renata Jakab (Hungary)

==== Group 2 ====
Pos	Team	Pld	W	W+	WP	L	GF	GA	GD	Pts
1	Spain	3	3	0	0	0	23	4	+19	9
2	Switzerland	3	2	0	0	1	10	9	+1	6
3	Czech Republic	3	1	0	0	2	8	13	–5	3
4	Netherlands	3	0	0	0	3	4	19	–15	0

30 August 2024	Czech Republic	4–2	Netherlands
11:30	Pychova 8', 22', 31'; Portychova 23'	Report	Jona 6'; Nidia 33'	Referee: Renata Jakab (Hungary)

30 August 2024	Switzerland	1–6	Spain
14:00	Schenk 31'	Report	Manau 4', 20'; A. Miron 6'; Cris G. 17'; Paqui C. 26'; N. Cuadrado 34'	Referee: Gustavo Barros (Portugal)

31 August 2024	Czech Republic	2–4	Switzerland
11:30	Kozarova 29'; Pychova 31'	Report	Raselli 19'; Küttel 23'; Vincenz 24'; Bucher 35'	Referee: Rick Jakob (Germany)

31 August 2024	Spain	10–1	Netherlands
14:00	A. Miron 1'; N. Cuadrado 1'; Alcaide 3', 16'; Paqui C. 6', 27'; M. Corbacho 15', 33'; Cris G. 21'; Jessi 26'	Report	Hopman 1'	Referee: Łukasz Ostrowski (Poland)

1 September 2024	Netherlands	1–5	Switzerland
11:30	Jona 28'	Report	Alissa 4' (o.g.); Morger 6'; Bühler 23'; Bucher 26', 28'	Referee: Francisco Costa (Portugal)

1 September 2024	Spain	7–2	Czech Republic
14:00	N. Cuadrado 1'; Paqui C. 23', 27', 32'; Portychova 18' (o.g.); Cris G. 27'; A. Miron 33'	Report	Pychova 3'; Kozarova 24'	Referee: Emmanuel Vocale (Belgium)

=== Awards ===
The following were presented after the conclusion of the final day's matches.

Event winners trophy	Top scorer(s)		Best player	Best goalkeeper
Spain	(Spain) Paqui Campoy	6 goals	(Spain) Andrea Mirón	(Ukraine) Anastasiia Terekh

== Superfinal (Alghero, 10–15 September) ==
Matches are listed as local time in Alghero, CEST (UTC+2) and are those scheduled; actual kick-off times may differ somewhat.

All matches took place on Lido San Giovanni Beach, the majority in an arena with a capacity of 1,200, whilst a few matches take place on an rudimentary auxiliary pitch.

The Netherlands were also due to compete but withdrew before the draw took place.

=== Group stage ===
==== Draw ====
The draw to divide the teams into their respective groups took place on 3 September 2024.

Key: Advance to –	Semi-finals /	5th–8th place play-offs /	(H) Hosts

==== Group A ====
Pos	Team	Pld	W	W+	WP	L	GF	GA	GD	Pts
1	Italy (H)	3	3	0	0	0	10	0	+10	9
2	Portugal	3	2	0	0	1	9	8	+1	6
3	Czech Republic	3	1	0	0	2	6	12	–6	3
4	Ukraine	3	0	0	0	3	3	8	–5	0

10 September 2024	Portugal	4–3	Ukraine
11:30	Marta 28', 30'; Carolina 32'; Daniela 34'		Yurasova 15'; Kostiuk 19'; Terekh 33'	Referee: Csaba Baghy (Hungary)

10 September 2024	Czech Republic	0–7	Italy
16:45			Portychova 3' (o.g.); Privitera 10', 32'; T. Santos 18'; Vecchione 27'; Massa 35'; Nietante 36'	Referee: Nikolaos Manouras (Greece)

11 September 2024	Portugal	5–3	Czech Republic
11:30	Beatriz 19'; Cristiana 30'; Marta 32'; Inês 35'; Carolina 36'		Duchatschova 23'; Pychova 30'; Kozarova 31'	Referee: Łukasz Ostrowski (Poland)

12 September 2024	Italy	1–0	Ukraine
16:45	Naticchioni 7'			Referee: Matthieu Dor (France)

13 September 2024	Ukraine	0–3	Czech Republic
10:15		Report	Pychova 22'; Novotna 23'; Dostalova 29'	Referee: Mehdi Sayoud (Belgium)

13 September 2024	Italy	2–0	Portugal
16:45	Privitera 4'; Penzo 16'	Report		Referee: Angelika Gębka (Poland)

==== Group B ====
Pos	Team	Pld	W	W+	WP	L	GF	GA	GD	Pts
1	Spain	3	3	0	0	0	25	6	+19	9
2	Poland	3	1	0	0	2	7	9	–2	3
3	Switzerland	3	1	0	0	2	8	10	–2	3
4	England	3	0	1	0	2	7	22	–15	2

Poland and Switzerland are ranked based on their head-to-head result (3–0).

11 September 2024	Poland	3–0	Switzerland
16:45	Suskiewicz 1'; Matusiak 14'; Szpera 20'	Report		Referee: Francisco Costa (Portugal)

11 September 2024	England	2–14	Spain
16:45	Scadding 12'; Barron 16'	Report	Carol Glez 2'; Paqui C. 5', 17'; L. Gallego 11'; A. Miron 11', 19'; Jessi 12'; N. Cuadrado 15'; Cris G. 15', 36'; Manau 22', 36'; Pilar 26'; M. Corbacho 34'	Referee: Sergio Gomes (Portugal)

12 September 2024	Spain	6–3	Switzerland
11:30	Manau 12', 33'; Jessi 15', 27'; Sara Tui 15'; M. Corbacho 24'	Report	Nauer 12'; Bucher 23'; Inderwildi 36'	Referee: Nikolaos Manouras (Greece)

12 September 2024	Poland	3–4 (a.e.t.)	England
16:45	Bednarska 12', 19', 28'	Report	Elouath 1', 23'; S. Catriona 8', 38' (e.t.)	Referee: Francisco Costa (Portugal)

13 September 2024	Switzerland	5–1	England
09:00	Inderwildi 3', 7'; Raselli 6', 23'; Bucher 20'	Report	Povey 36'	Referee: Fiammetta Susanna (Italy)

13 September 2024	Spain	5–1	Poland
11:30	Cris G. 5'; Paqui C. 13', 28'; Jessi 30'; Carol Glez 36'	Report	Słowy 14'	Referee: Csaba Baghy (Hungary)

=== Play-offs ===
==== 5th–8th place ====
5th–8th place semifinals
14 September
Switzerland	3
Ukraine	5
14 September
Czech Republic	9
England	2

Fifth place match
15 September
Ukraine	3
Czech Republic	2
Seventh place match
15 September
Switzerland	6
England	1

===== Semi-finals =====
14 September 2024
09:00

Switzerland	3–5	Ukraine
Bucher 29'; Flury 33'; Schenk 35'	Report	Bavzeniuk 8', 24', 35'; Yurasova 25'; Kostiuk 26'

Referee: Alejandro Ojaos (Spain)

14 September 2024
12:45

Czech Republic	9–2	England
Kozarova 1'; Dostalova 3'; Novotna 15', 17'; Matejkova 19', 23'; Elouath 22' (o.g.); Portychova 25'; Chocholousova 32'	Report	S. Catriona 16', 32'

Referee: Łukasz Ostrowski (Poland)

===== 7th place match =====
15 September 2024
09:00

England	1–6	Switzerland
Elouath 36'	Report	Inderwildi 1'; Schenk 8', 36'; Bucher 20'; Williams 33'; Raselli 35'

Referee: Nikolaos Manouras (Greece)

===== 5th place match =====
15 September 2024
11:30

Czech Republic	2–3	Ukraine
Kozarova 23'; Duchatschova 31'	Report	Kostiuk 7'; Klipachenko 13'; Bavzeniuk 21'

Referee: Malte Gerhardt (Germany)

==== 1st–4th place ====
Semifinals
14 September
Spain	3
Portugal	4
14 September
Italy	0
Poland	3

Final
15 September
Portugal	1
Poland	5
Third place match
15 September
Spain	2
Italy	1

===== Semi-finals =====
14 September 2024
14:00

Spain	3–4	Portugal
Carol Glez 10'; N. Cuadrado 13'; Manau 32'	Report	Marta 3'; Cristiana 17', 33'; Ema T. 20'

Referee: Malte Gerhardt (Germany)

14 September 2024
16:45

Italy	0–3	Poland
	Report	Gozdek 7'; Matusiak 29'; Sudyk 31'

Referee: Csaba Baghy (Hungary)

===== 3rd place match =====
15 September 2024
14:00

Italy	1–2	Spain
Ferrazza 13'	Report	Manau 13'; Jessi 19'

Referee: Matthieu Dor (France)

===== Final =====
15 September 2024
16:45

Poland	5–1	Portugal
Sudyk 1'; Słowy 3'; Szpera 10'; Matusiak 15', 19'	Report	Daniela 34'

Referee: Fiammetta Susanna (Italy)

=== Awards ===
==== Winners trophy ====
2024 Women's Euro Beach Soccer League
Champions

Poland
First title

==== Individual awards ====
Top scorer(s)
(Spain) Adriana Manau
6 goals
Best player
(Poland) Paulina Bednarska
Best goalkeeper
(Poland) Adriana Banaszkiewicz

=== Final standings ===
Pos	Team	Result
1	Poland	WEBSL Champions (1st title)
2	Portugal	Runners-up
3	Spain	Third place
4	Italy	
5	Ukraine	
6	Czech Republic	
7	Switzerland	
8	England	

== See also ==
- 2024 Euro Beach Soccer League (men's)
