= Beach soccer at the 2023 European Games =

- Venue: Tarnów Beach Arena
- Location: Tarnów, Poland
- Dates: 27 June – 1 July
- Competitors: 167 from 9 nations
- Teams: 14

The beach soccer tournament at the 2023 European Games will be held; the discipline was confirmed to be part of the Games on 30 August 2021. It will be the third edition of beach soccer at the European Games following 2015 and 2019.

Two events will take place: the men's tournament the women's tournament. The former will take place for the third time at the Games, and the latter for the first time. A total of 14 teams will participate (eight in the men's competition and six in the women's).

Portugal are the defending gold medallists of the men's tournament.

== Competition schedule ==
G	Group stage	C	Classification	½	Semifinals	B	Bronze medal match	F	Gold medal match

Date Event	Tue 27	Wed 28	Thu 29	Fri 30		Sat 1		
Men	G	G	G	C	½	C	B	F
Women	G	G	G	C	½		B	F

== Qualification ==
=== Men's tournament ===
Poland qualify automatically as the host country. The remaining teams qualified through the 2022 Euro Beach Soccer League (EBSL). The top six teams of the Superfinal qualified along with the winners of the Promotion Final.

Means of qualification	Date of competition	Venue	Berths	Qualified
Host country	—		1	Poland
2022 EBSL Superfinal	10–11 September 2022	(Italy) Alghero	6	Azerbaijan; Italy; Portugal; Spain; Switzerland; Ukraine
2022 EBSL Promotion Final	27–31 July 2022	(Moldova) Chișinău	1	Moldova
Total			8	

=== Women's tournament ===
Poland qualify automatically as the host country. The remaining teams qualified through the 2022 Women's Euro Beach Soccer League (WEBSL). The top five teams of the Superfinal qualified.

Means of qualification	Date of competition	Venue	Berths	Qualified
Host country	—		1	Poland
2022 WEBSL Superfinal	10–11 September 2022	(Italy) Alghero	5	Czech Republic (Note: England originally qualified, but because England does not have an independent NOC they cannot compete and so were subsequently replaced by the Czech Republic.); Italy; Portugal; Spain; Ukraine
Total			6	

== Participating NOCs ==
The following National Olympic Committees (NOCs), as per the outcome of qualification events, will participate (the number of participating athletes of each NOC are shown in parentheses).

- Azerbaijan (12)
- Czech Republic (12)
- Italy (24)
- Moldova (12)
- Poland (24)
- Portugal (24)
- Spain (23)
- Switzerland (12)
- Ukraine (24)

== Medal summary ==
=== Medalists ===
Event	Gold	Silver	Bronze
Men's tournament	Switzerland; Silvano Kessler; Angelo Wüest; Michael Rodrigues; Tobias Steinemann; Sandro Spaccarotella; Dejan Stankovic; Noël Ott; Glenn Hodel; Patrick Rüttimann; Eliott Mounoud; Ariel Schranz; Gabriel Pereira	Italy; Sebastiano Paterniti; Alessandro Miceli; Gianmarco Genovali; Fabio Sciacca; Tommaso Fazzini; Emmanuele Zurlo; Marco Giordani; Luca Bertacca; Samuele Sassari; Alessandro Remedi; Ovidio Alla; Leandro Casapieri	Spain; Francisco Donaire; Antonio Riguard; Jose Oliver; Jose Arias; David Ardil; Francisco Mejías; Domingo Cabrera; Pedro Garcia; Miguel Santiso; Antonio Mayor; Chiky Ardil; Jose Caballero
Women's tournament	Spain; Jennifer Pedro de Blas; Andrea Mirón; Andrea Alcaide Martín; María Corbacho; Lorena Asensio Ruiz; Adriana Manau; Sara González Rodríguez; Carolina González Portela; Jessica Higueras; Cristina González Chaves; Laura Gallego Silvente	Ukraine; Anastasiia Klipachenko; Mariia Tykhonova; Yuliia Dekhtiar; Yuliia Kostiuk; Myroslava Vypasniak; Viktoriia Kyslova; Iryna Dubytska; Taisiia Babenko; Iryna Vasylyuk; Alona Kyrylchuk; Anna Shulha; Anastasiia Terekh	Portugal; Jamila Marreiros; Ema Toscano; Joana Flores; Inês Branco Cruz; Cristiana Costa; Mélissa Gomes; Érica Ferreira; Petra Reis; Andreia Silva; Catarina Clara Mesquita; Sofia Vicente; Marta Simões

=== Medal table ===
Rank	NOC	Gold	Silver	Bronze	Total
1	Spain	1	0	1	2
2	Switzerland	1	0	0	1
3	Italy	0	1	0	1
3	Ukraine	0	1	0	1
5	Portugal	0	0	1	1
Totals (5 entries)		2	2	2	6

== See also ==
- Beach soccer at the 2023 World Beach Games
