= Beach soccer at the 2023 European Games – Women's tournament =

Tournament details
- Host country: Poland
- Dates: 27 June – 1 July
- Teams: 6 (from 1 confederation)
- Venue: Tarnów Beach Arena

Final positions
- Champions: Spain (1st title)
- Runners-up: Ukraine
- Third place: Portugal
- Fourth place: Poland

Tournament statistics
- Matches played: 11
- Goals scored: 50 (4.55 per match)
- Top scorer(s): (Portugal) Cristiana Costa (Portugal) Mélissa Gomes (3 goals)

The women's beach soccer tournament at the 2023 European Games was held from 27 June to 1 July at the Tarnów Beach Arena.

== Draw ==
The draw was held on 11 May 2023 in Barcelona, at the headquarters of Beach Soccer Worldwide.

Seedings

Pot 1	Pot 2	Pot 3
Poland; Spain	Italy; Portugal	Czech Republic; Ukraine

== Group stage ==
All times are local (UTC+2).

=== Group A ===
Pos	Team	Pld	W	W+	WP	L	GF	GA	GD	Pts	Qualification
1	Portugal	2	2	0	0	0	7	2	+5	6	Semifinals
2	Poland (H)	2	1	0	0	1	6	3	+3	3	Semifinals
3	Czech Republic	2	0	0	0	2	2	10	−8	0	Fifth place match

Source: EG2023
(H) Host
27 June 2023
19:00

Poland	5–1	Czech Republic
Gozdek 7'; Okoniewska 10', 32' (pen.); Nowak 24'; Sobal 31'	BSWW; EG2023	Pýchová 26'

Tarnów Beach Arena
Referee: Annett Unterbeck (Germany)
28 June 2023
19:00

Portugal	5–1	Czech Republic
Inês 8'; Cristiana 22', 29'; Hrušková 24' (o.g.); Gomes 25' (pen.)	BSWW; EG2023	Folprechtová 22'

Tarnów Beach Arena
Referee: Attila Balint (Romania)
29 June 2023
19:00

Poland	1–2	Portugal
Gozdek 35'	BSWW; EG2023	Gomes 26' (pen.), 36'

Tarnów Beach Arena
Referee: Dmytro Dudka (Ukraina)

=== Group B ===
Pos	Team	Pld	W	W+	WP	L	GF	GA	GD	Pts	Qualification
1	Spain	2	1	0	1	0	6	4	+2	4	Semifinals
2	Ukraine	2	1	0	0	1	6	7	−1	3	Semifinals
3	Italy	2	0	0	0	2	1	2	−1	0	Fifth place match

Source: EG2023
27 June 2023
14:30

Spain	6–4	Ukraine
Alcaide 3', 20'; Mirón 11', 30'; Cris 12', 17'	BSWW; EG2023	Vasylyuk 13'; Klipachenko 16', 20'; Shulha 35'

Tarnów Beach Arena
Referee: Angelika Gębka (Poland)
28 June 2023
14:30

Italy	1–2	Ukraine
Bargi 26'	BSWW; EG2023	Dekhtiar 33', 34'

Tarnów Beach Arena
Referee: Tomasz Winiarczyk (Poland)
29 June 2023
14:30

Spain	0–0 (a.e.t.)	Italy
	BSWW; EG2023
Penalties
Corbacho (penalty scored); Carol (penalty scored); Cris (penalty scored); Lorena (penalty scored)	4–2	(penalty scored) Maiorca; (penalty missed) Naticchioni; (penalty scored) Iannella; (penalty missed) Santos

Tarnów Beach Arena
Referee: Francisco da Costa (Portugal)

== Knockout stage ==
=== Bracket ===
Semifinals
30 June
Portugal	1
Ukraine	3
30 June
Poland	2
Spain	3

Gold medal match
1 July
Ukraine	2 (3)
Spain (p)	2 (5)
Bronze medal match
1 July
Portugal (p)	2 (3)
Poland	2 (0)

=== Semifinals ===
30 June 2023
16:00

Portugal	1–3	Ukraine
Cristiana 14'	BSWW; EG2023	Dubytska 4'; Kostiuk 20'; Tykhonova 31'

Tarnów Beach Arena
Referee: Dario Minder (Switzerland)

30 June 2023
19:00

Poland	2–3	Spain
Dewicka 14'; Kaczmarek 15'	BSWW; EG2023	Sara 2'; Cris 19'; Alcaide 22' (pen.)

Tarnów Beach Arena
Referee: Saverio Bottalico (Italy)

=== Fifth place match ===
30 June 2023
11:30

Czech Republic	2–3 (a.e.t.)	Italy
Matějková 2'; Hrušková 24'	BSWW; EG2023	Privitera 26', 38' (pen.); Vecchione 36'

Tarnów Beach Arena
Referee: Angelika Gębka (Poland)

=== Bronze medal match ===
1 July 2023
15:30

Portugal	2–2 (a.e.t.)	Poland
Ema 23'; Inês 26'	BSWW; EG2023	Nowak 4'; Dewicka 23'
Penalties
Ema (penalty scored); Cristiana (penalty scored); Inês (penalty missed); Gomes (penalty scored)	3–0	(penalty missed) Okoniewska; (penalty missed) Słowy; (penalty missed) Suskiewicz

Tarnów Beach Arena
Referee: Matthieu Dor (France)

=== Gold medal match ===
1 July 2023
18:30

Ukraine	2–2 (a.e.t.)	Spain
Shulha 35'; Kostiuk 37'	BSWW; EG2023	Jessi 36'; Mirón 39'
Penalties
Kostiuk (penalty scored); Klipachenko (penalty missed); Dekhtiar (penalty scored); Dubytska (penalty scored)	3–5	(penalty scored) Corbacho; (penalty scored) Carol; (penalty scored) Cris; (penalty scored) Lorena; (penalty scored) Manau

Tarnów Beach Arena
Referee: Annett Unterbeck (Germany)

== Final standings ==
Pos	Grp	Team	Pld	W	W+	WP	L	GF	GA	GD	Pts
1st place, gold medalist(s)	B	Spain	4	2	0	2	0	11	8	+3	8
2nd place, silver medalist(s)	B	Ukraine	4	2	0	0	2	11	10	+1	6
3rd place, bronze medalist(s)	A	Portugal	4	2	0	1	1	10	7	+3	7
4	A	Poland (H)	4	1	0	0	3	10	8	+2	3
5	B	Italy	3	0	1	0	2	4	4	0	2
6	A	Czech Republic	3	0	0	0	3	4	13	−9	0

Source: EG2023
(H) Host

== See also ==
- Beach soccer at the 2023 European Games – Men's tournament
