= 2025 Women's Euro Beach Soccer League =

Tournament details
- Host countries: Spain; Italy
- Dates: 22 May – 14 September
- Teams: 10 (from 1 confederation)
- Venue(s): 3 (in 3 host cities)

Final positions
- Champions: Portugal (1st title)
- Runners-up: Spain
- Third place: Ukraine
- Fourth place: Poland

Tournament statistics
- Matches played: 26
- Goals scored: 162 (6.23 per match)

The 2025 Women's Euro Beach Soccer League was the fifth edition of the Women's Euro Beach Soccer League (WEBSL). It is the annual, premier competition in European beach soccer contested between women's national teams, succeeding the Women's Euro Beach Soccer Cup (2016–19). Organised by Beach Soccer Worldwide (BSWW), it is the women's version of the men's long-running Euro Beach Soccer League, which began in 1998.

The league consisted of two phases: two rounds of fixtures comprising the regular season, and the playoff event, the Superfinal, in which the teams then directly contest the league title, with the winners becoming WEBSL champions.

Poland were the time defending champions, but failed to defend their title, finishing in fourth place. The title was won by Portugal who won the competition for the first time.

== Calendar and locations ==
The initial calendar was revealed on 31 January 2025. Alghero was replaced as Superfinal hosts on 16 April 2025. A stage was due to take place in Batumi but did not materialise.

Phase	Dates	Country	City	Stage
Regular season	22–25 May	Spain	El Puerto de Santa María	Stage 1
Regular season	25–27 July	Italy	Castellammare di Stabia	Stage 2
Play-offs	9–14 September	Italy	Viareggio	Superfinal

== Stage 1 (El Puerto de Santa María, 23–25 May) ==
Matches are listed as local time in El Puerto de Santa María, CEST (UTC+2) and are those scheduled; actual kick-off times may somewhat differ.

All matches take place inside the Plaza de toros de El Puerto bullring, in tandem with stage 1 of the men's competition.

Belgium made their debut in the competition during this stage.

Key: Advance to –	Final /	3rd place match /	5th place match /	(H) Hosts

=== Group 1 ===
Pos	Team	Pld	W	W+	WP	L	GF	GA	GD	Pts
1	Spain (H)	2	2	0	0	0	6	3	+3	6
2	Ukraine	2	1	0	0	1	7	5	+2	3
3	England	2	0	0	0	2	2	7	–5	0

22 May 2025	Spain	4–2	Ukraine
18:45	Jessi 9'; A. Mirón 31'; Manau 35'; Sara Tui 35'	Report	Klipachenko 6'; Dubytska 27'	Referee: Fiammetta Susanna (Italy)

23 May 2025	Ukraine	5–1	England
16:15	Dubytska 5'; Kostiuk 13', 17', 30'; Skybina 22'	Report	Miller 28'	Referee: Nikolaos Manouras (Greece)

24 May 2025	Spain	2–1	England
18:45	Carol G. 10'; A. Mirón 31'	Report	Elouath 19'	Referee: Rick Jakob (Germany)

=== Group 2 ===
Pos	Team	Pld	W	W+	WP	L	GF	GA	GD	Pts
1	Poland	2	2	0	0	0	14	3	+11	6
2	Czechia	2	1	0	0	1	10	6	+4	3
3	Belgium	2	0	0	0	2	3	18	–15	0

22 May 2025	Poland	9–2	Belgium
17:30	Szpera 1', 5', 10'; Bednarska 1', 18'; Gozdek 2'; Matusiak 22'; Sudyk 31'; Banaszkiewicz 33'	Report	Cagla In 16'; Henrotin 28'	Referee: Gustavo Barros (Portugal)

23 May 2025	Czechia	9–1	Belgium
13:30	Portychova 7', 35'; Folprechtova 10'; Chocholousova 11', 28'; De Regge 23' (o.g.); Cizova 24'; Catinus 28' (o.g.); Dlouha 33'	Report	Creemers 29'	Referee: Alejandro Ojaos (Belgium)

24 May 2025	Poland	5–1	Czechia
14:45	Szpera 1'; Sudyk 6'; Tobiczyk 8'; Suskiewicz 13'; Gozdek 14'	Report	Matejkova 34'	Referee: José Pardeiro (Spain)

=== Play-offs ===
25 May 2025 Fifth place match	England	5–0	Belgium
11:00	M. Barron-Clark 24', 28', 36'; R. Barron-Clark 30'; A. Povey 32'	Report		Referee: Giorgio Piraccini (Italy)

25 May 2025 Third place match	Ukraine	4–3	Czech Republic
14:45	Klipachenko 16'; Kostiuk 22'; Skybina 23', 29'	Report	Folprechtova 1', 16'; Chocholousova 27'	Referee: Alicia Galán (Spain)

25 May 2025 Final	Spain	3–2	Poland
18:45	Paqui C. 16', 21'; Alcaide 27'	Report	Banaszkiewicz 25'; Matusiak 32'	Referee: Fiammetta Susanna (Italy)

=== Awards ===
The following were presented after the conclusion of the final day's matches.

Stage winners trophy	Top scorer(s)		Best player	Best goalkeeper
Spain	(Poland) Magdalena Szpera (Note: Yuliia Kostiuk (Ukraine) also scored four goals however did not officially share the award for reasons unknown.)	4 goals	(Spain) Andrea Mirón	(Spain) Laura Gallego

== Stage 2 (Castellammare di Stabia, 25–27 July) ==
Matches are listed as local time in Castellammare di Stabia, CEST (UTC+2) and are those scheduled; actual kick-off times may somewhat differ.

All matches took place at Stabia Beach Arena, with a capacity of approximately 2,500, in tandem with stage 3 of the men's competition.

Pos	Team	Pld	W	W+	WP	L	GF	GA	GD	Pts
1	Portugal	3	3	0	0	0	18	8	+10	9
2	Switzerland	3	1	0	1	1	14	12	+2	4
3	Italy (H)	3	1	0	0	2	9	9	0	3
4	Netherlands	3	0	0	0	3	5	17	–12	0

25 July 2025	Portugal	8–3	Switzerland
16:30	Cristiana 10'; Ferreira 13'; Joana Meira 14'; Carolina 15', 32'; Mélissa G. 17', 24'; Inês C. 25'	Report	Flury 10'; Schärer 19'; Raselli 29'	Referee: Ago Kärtmann (Estonia)

25 July 2025	Netherlands	2–3	Italy
19:15	Lize 5'; Mariël 12'	Report	Vecchione 2'; Galloni 8'; Galluccio 34'	Referee: Alicia Galan (Spain)

26 July 2025	Portugal	6–2	Netherlands
16:30	Inês C. 21', 33'; Andreia 29'; Flores 30', 36'; Mélissa G. 31'	Report	Nancy 30'; Jona 36'	Referee: Alicia Galan Cayado (Spain)

26 July 2025	Italy	3–3 (a.e.t.) (6–7 p)	Switzerland
19:15	Ciccarelli 4'; Vecchione 10'; Galloni 37'	Report	Flury 12', 31'; Raselli 36'	Referee: Ago Kärtmann (Estonia)
	Penalties
	Nietante (penalty scored); Illiano (penalty scored); Naticchioni (penalty missed); Ciccarelli (penalty missed); Privitera (penalty scored); Vecchione (penalty scored); Galluccio (penalty scored); Veglio (penalty scored); Ferrazza (penalty missed)		(penalty missed) Flury; (penalty scored) Küffer; (penalty missed) Schenk; (penalty scored) Inderwildi; (penalty scored) Raselli; (penalty scored) Garcia; (penalty scored) Eisenegger; (penalty scored) Williams; (penalty scored) Nauer

27 July 2025	Switzerland	8–1	Netherlands
16:30	Morger 10'; Küffer 17'; Eisenegger 19', 26', 33'; Inderwildi 28'; Nidia 29' (o.g.); Nancy 36' (o.g.)	Report	Lize 31'	Referee: Alicia Galan (Spain)

27 July 2025	Italy	3–4	Portugal
19:15	Ferrazza 13'; Nietante 23'; Olivieri 27'	Report	Ema T. 6'; Mélissa G. 19', 33'; Cristiana 21'	Referee: Oleg Cebotari (Moldova)

=== Awards ===
The following were presented after the conclusion of the final day's matches.

Stage winners trophy	Top scorer(s)		Best player	Best goalkeeper
Portugal	(Portugal) Mélissa Gomes	5 goals	(Portugal) Mélissa Gomes	(Italy) Martina Galloni

== Superfinal (Viareggio, 9–14 September) ==
Matches are listed as local time in Viareggio, CEST (UTC+2) and are those scheduled; actual kick-off times may differ somewhat.

Six teams qualify for the Superfinal: the top three teams from stage 1, the winner of stage 2, the next best team statistically across both stages, and hosts Italy who qualify automatically.

All matches take place at Matteo Valenti Beach Stadium, with a capacity of 1,000.

=== Group stage ===
==== Draw ====
The draw to divide the teams into their respective groups took place on 11 August 2025.

Key: Advance to –	Semi-finals /	5th place match /	(H) Hosts

==== Group A ====
Pos	Team	Pld	W	W+	WP	L	GF	GA	GD	Pts
1	Portugal	2	1	0	1	0	5	4	+1	4
2	Poland	2	0	0	1	1	6	7	–1	1
3	Switzerland	2	0	0	0	2	8	8	0	0

9 September 2025	Portugal	3–3 (a.e.t.) (4–3 p)	Switzerland
12:45	Joana Meira 18'; Flores 24'; Inês C. 25'	Report	Küffer 1', 30'; Raselli 26'	Referee: Annett Unterbeck (Germany)

10 September 2025	Poland	5–5 (a.e.t.) (3–2 p)	Switzerland
16:45	Korda 3'; Jałocha 19'; Suskiewicz 23'; Gozdek 27'; Kamińska 32'	Report	Williams 9', 20'; Flury 22', 27'; Küffer 12'	Referee: Raffaele Delvecchio (Italy)

12 September 2025	Portugal	2–1	Poland
12:45	Carolina 21'; Inês C. 35'	Report	Korda 7'	Referee: Matthieu Dor (France)

==== Group B ====
Pos	Team	Pld	W	W+	WP	L	GF	GA	GD	Pts
1	Spain	2	2	0	0	0	7	2	+5	6
2	Ukraine	2	1	0	0	1	6	6	0	3
3	Italy (H)	2	0	0	0	2	2	7	–5	0

9 September 2025	Spain	3–0	Italy
16:45	Jessi 1'; C. Glez 25'; A. Miron 26'	Report		Referee: Matthieu Dor (France)

11 September 2025	Ukraine	4–2	Italy
18:00	Prokopenko 14'; Terekh 17'; Shulha 32', 35'	Report	Adami 23'; Pisa 24'	Referee: Vladimir Tashkov (Bulgaria)

12 September 2025	Spain	4–2	Ukraine
16:45	Alcaide 8', 17'; Pilar 14'; C. Glez 33'	Report	Kostiuk 7'; Dubytska 21'	Referee: Annett Unterbeck (Germany)

=== Semi-finals ===
13 September 2025
14:00

Portugal	3–1	Ukraine
Marta 12'; Inês C. 18', 36'	Report	Kostiuk 10'

Referee: Saverio Bottalico (Italy)

13 September 2025
15:30

Spain	2–0	Poland
Palacios 7'; Laia 11'	Report

Referee: Matthieu Dor (France)

=== Finals ===
==== 5th place match ====
13 September 2025
12:45

Switzerland	1–4	Italy
Küffer 2'	Report	Illiano 4', 12'; Ciccarelli 6'; Veglio 30'

Referee: Vitalij Gomolko (Lithuania)

==== 3rd place match ====
14 September 2025
12:45

Ukraine	3–3 (a.e.t.)	Poland
Shulha 3'; Bavzeniuk 11'; Yurasova 21'	Report	Sudyk 2'; Jałocha 18', 24'
Penalties
	4–3

Referee: Vitalij Gomolko (Lithuania)

==== Championship match ====
14 September 2025
16:30

Spain	2–4	Portugal
Manau 22'; A. Miron 25'	Report	Flores 7', 14', 27'; Carolina 31'

Referee: Moreno Longo (Italy)

=== Awards ===
==== Winners trophy ====
2025 Women's Euro Beach Soccer League
Champions

Portugal
First title

==== Individual awards ====
Top scorer(s)
(Portugal) Joana Flores (Note: Inês Cruz (Portugal) and Pascale Küffer (Switzerland) also scored four goals however did not officially share the award for reasons unknown.)
4 goals
Best player
(Portugal) Inês Cruz
Best goalkeeper
(Portugal) Jamila Marreiros

=== Final standings ===
Pos	Team	Result
1	Portugal	WEBSL Champions (1st title)
2	Spain	Runners-up
3	Ukraine	Third place
4	Poland	
5	Italy	
6	Switzerland	

== See also ==
- 2025 Euro Beach Soccer League (men's)
