= 2025 Euro Beach Soccer League =

Tournament details
- Host countries: Spain; Georgia; Italy; Moldova
- Dates: 23 May – 14 September
- Venue: 5 (in 5 host cities)

Final positions
- Champions: Italy (4th title)
- Runners-up: Spain
- Third place: Belarus
- Fourth place: Ukraine

Tournament statistics
- Matches played: 93
- Goals scored: 762 (8.19 per match)

Locations of the four stages and the play-offs of the 2025 Euro Beach Soccer League

The 2025 Euro Beach Soccer League was the 28th edition of the Euro Beach Soccer League (EBSL), the annual, premier competition in European beach soccer contested between men's national teams. It is organised by Beach Soccer Worldwide (BSWW).

This season, the competing teams continued to take part in two divisions: the top tier (Division A) and the bottom tier (Division B).

Portugal were the defending champions, but failed to defend their title, finishing in fifth place. The title was won by Italy who won the competition for the fourth time.

== Calendar and locations ==
The initial calendar was revealed on 31 January 2025. Alghero was replaced as Superfinal hosts on 16 April 2025.

Phase	Dates	Country	City	Stage	Divisions	
Regular season	23–25 May	Spain	El Puerto de Santa María	Stage 1	A	B
Regular season	18–20 July	Georgia	Batumi	Stage 2	A	
Regular season	25–27 July	Italy	Castellammare di Stabia	Stage 3	A	B
Regular season	1–3 August	Moldova	Chișinău	Stage 4	A	
Play-offs	9–14 September	Italy	Viareggio	Promotion Final		B
Play-offs	9–14 September	Italy	Viareggio	Relegation play-outs	A	
Play-offs	9–14 September	Italy	Viareggio	Superfinal	A	

== Stage 1 (El Puerto de Santa María, 23–25 May) ==
Matches are listed as local time in El Puerto de Santa María, CEST (UTC+2) and are those scheduled; actual kick-off times may somewhat differ.

All matches took place inside the Plaza de toros de El Puerto bullring, in tandem with stage 1 of the women's competition.

Total attendance for the stage, including the women's matches, was approximately 22,800.

Belgium made their first appearance in the competition since 2006. France achieved their first victory over Portugal in the competition since the 2007 season.

=== Division A ===
==== Group 1 ====
Pos	Team	Pld	W	W+	WP	L	GF	GA	GD	Pts
1	Spain (H)	3	3	0	0	0	24	7	+17	9
2	Ukraine	3	2	0	0	1	11	8	+3	6
3	Germany	3	1	0	0	2	9	10	–1	3
4	Georgia	3	0	0	0	3	7	26	–19	0

23 May 2025	Ukraine	3–2	Germany
14:45	Samoilenko 27'; Voitok 31'; Zborovskyi 33'	Report	Schulte 2'; Peterson 14'	Referee: Attila Balint (Romania)

23 May 2025	Georgia	3–15	Spain
20:00	Shamiladze 21', 28'; Makharadze 32'	Report	Kuman 2'; Chiky 13', 18', 26', 31'; Gatica 15', 17'; Suli Batis 14', 20'; Ramy 22', 32', 34'; D. Ardil 27'; R. Galindo 30'; Antonio 36'	Referee: Mehdi Sayoud (Belgium)

24 May 2025	Ukraine	5–1	Georgia
13:30	Glutskyi 8'; Zborovskyi 20', 30'; Samoilenko 23'; Voitok 36'	Report	Kokoladze 35'	Referee: Rick Jakob (Germany)

24 May 2025	Spain	4–1	Germany
20:00	Chiky 22'; Suli Batis 29'; Kuman 35'; R. Galindo 36'	Report	Peterson 19'	Referee: Davide Innaurato (Italy)

25 May 2025	Germany	6–3	Georgia
16:15	Baaske 2'; Knüppel 6'; Schulte 24'; Skeip 29'; Olli 33'; Sand 36'	Report	Jalagania 1'; Partenadze 16'; Makharadze 20'	Referee: Gustavo Barros (Portugal)

25 May 2025	Spain	5–3	Ukraine
20:00	Chiky 1', 36'; Ridu 20'; Glutskyi 26' (o.g.); Kuman 36'	Report	Nerush 29'; A. Borsuk 31'; Voitok 34'	Referee: Raffaele Delvecchio (Italy)

==== Group 2 ====
Pos	Team	Pld	W	W+	WP	L	GF	GA	GD	Pts
1	France	3	3	0	0	0	16	9	+7	9
2	Portugal	3	2	0	0	1	17	8	+9	6
3	Poland	3	1	0	0	2	9	7	+2	3
4	Turkey	3	0	0	0	3	8	26	–18	0

23 May 2025	Poland	2–4	France
17:30	Niesler 7'; Brochocki 36'	Report	Constant 17', 30'; Angeletti 25'; Laassami 36'	Referee: Francisco de Oses (Spain)

23 May 2025	Turkey	3–12	Portugal
18:45	Efe Lorenzo 14'; Bernardo L. 17' (o.g.); Ege 21'	Report	A. Lourenço 4', 30'; Bernardo L. 5'; Tim 10', 35'; Jordan 13'; Léo Martins 15', 22'; Bê Martins 21'; R. Pinhal 23'; R. Brilhante 34'; M. Pintado 36'	Referee: Alejandro Ojaos (Spain)

24 May 2025	Poland	6–1	Turkey
16:15	Jesionowski 7', 32'; Mańka 17'; Brochocki 21', 30'; Poźniak 33'	Report	Efe Lorenzo 15'	Referee: Raffaele Delvecchio (Italy)

24 May 2025	Portugal	3–4	France
17:30	Bernardo L. 4'; R. Brilhante 7'; Jordan 33'	Report	Basquaise 1'; Constant 16'; Angeletti 25'; Artuphel 27'	Referee: Mehdi Sayoud (Belgium)

25 May 2025	France	8–4	Turkey
13:30	Bru 5', 6', 25', 33'; Basquaise 9'; Angeletti 15', 31'; Gosselin 18'	Report	Ege 6', 15'; Hüseyin 17'; Efe Lorenzo 23'	Referee: Alejandro Ojaos (Spain)

25 May 2025	Portugal	2–1	Poland
17:30	Bernardo L. 7'; Jordan 10'	Report	Bistuła 18'	Referee: Davide Innaurato (Italy)

=== Awards ===
The following were presented after the conclusion of the final day's matches.

Stage Winners trophy	Top scorer(s)		Best player	Best goalkeeper
Spain	(Spain) Chiky Ardil	7 goals	(Spain) Chiky Ardil	(France) Théo Guerin

=== Division B ===
The top three teams qualify for the Superfinal.

Pos	Team	Pld	W	W+	WP	L	GF	GA	GD	Pts
1	Lithuania	3	2	1	0	0	11	5	+6	8
2	Azerbaijan	3	1	1	0	1	19	10	+9	5
3	Belgium	3	0	0	1	2	4	16	–12	1
4	England	3	0	0	0	3	8	11	–3	0

23 May 2025	Azerbaijan	5–4 (a.e.t.)	England
11:00	Bayram 8'; Ramil 24', 29'; Lawson 36' (o.g.); Sahib 39' (e.t.)	Report	Lawson 2'; Johnson 29'; O'Rourke 8', 20'	Referee: Arpad Jakab (Hungary)

23 May 2025	Belgium	0–3	Lithuania
12:15		Report	Novičkov 7'; Lambert 12' (o.g.); Plytnikas 28'	Referee: Nikolaos Manouras (Greece)

24 May 2025	Azerbaijan	11–2	Belgium
11:00	Ramil 1', 2', 14'; Jomard 6', 18'; Elshad 16'; Kamil 19'; Orkhan 22'; Amid 23'; Sahib 25'; Bayram 33'	Report	Ennya 1'; Cardon 30'	Referee: Gustavo Barros (Portugal)

24 May 2025	Lithuania	4–2	England
12:15	Giedraitis 10'; Novičkov 11', 14'; Lebedevas 21'	Report	Friery 18'; Lawson 24'	Referee: Alejandro Ojaos (Spain)

25 May 2025	England	2–2 (a.e.t.) (1–4 p)	Belgium
09:45	Day 10'; Henderson 14'	Report	Depotbeker 27', 30'	Referee: José Pardeiro (Spain)

25 May 2025	Lithuania	4–3 (a.e.t.)	Azerbaijan
12:15	Makutunovičius 10', 39' (e.t.); Navickas 33'; Giedraitis 37' (e.t.)	Report	Orkhan 10', 34', 39' (e.t.)	Referee: Arpad Jakab (Hungary)

=== Awards ===
The following were presented after the conclusion of the final day's matches.

Stage Winners trophy	Top scorer(s)		Best player	Best goalkeeper
Lithuania	(Azerbaijan) Ramil Aliyev	5 goals	(Azerbaijan) Orkhan Mammadov	(Lithuania) Modestas Kulikauskas

== Stage 2 (Batumi, 18–20 July) ==
Matches are listed as local time in Batumi, GET (UTC+4) and are those scheduled; actual kick-off times may somewhat differ.

All matches took place at Batumi Beach Arena.

=== Division A ===
==== Group 1 ====
Pos	Team	Pld	W	W+	WP	L	GF	GA	GD	Pts
1	Portugal	3	3	0	0	0	20	7	+13	9
2	Switzerland	3	2	0	0	1	20	9	+11	6
3	Georgia (H)	3	1	0	0	2	8	26	–18	3
4	Estonia	3	0	0	0	3	2	8	–6	0

18 July 2025	Portugal	6–5	Switzerland
18:00	R. Brilhante 13', 20'; Coimbra 23'; M. Pintado 25', 26'; A. Lourenço 27'	Report	Borer 4', 8', 26'; Hodel 13'; J. Knöpfli 35'	Referee: Vitalij Gomolko (Lithuania)

18 July 2025	Estonia	2–3	Georgia
21:00	Lilleorg 12'; Lepik 36'	Report	M. Shamiladze 16'; Munskind 19' (o.g.); G.Makharadze 25'	Referee: Jurijs Ivusins (Latvia)

19 July 2025	Portugal	2–0	Estonia
18:00	Bernardo L. 12'; Coimbra 15'	Report		Referee: Nail Naghiyev (Azerbaijan)

19 July 2025	Georgia	3–12	Switzerland
21:00	Partenadze 4', 20'; G.Makharadze 11'	Report	Hodel 2', 15', 23'; Steinemann 4'; Borer 10', 13', 31'; J. Knöpfli 13'; Gmür 15', 34'; M. Shamiladze 28' (o.g.); Y. Knöpfli 36'	Referee: Vitalij Gomolko (Lithuania)

20 July 2025	Switzerland	3–0	Estonia
16:30	Borer 15', 18'; Kessler 23'	Report		Referee: Idris Yavuz (Turkey)

20 July 2025	Georgia	2–12	Portugal
21:00	Z.Shamiladze 19'; Diakvnishvili 21'	Report	Tim 1'; Bernardo L. 6', 18', 24', 36'; M. Pintado 10'; A. Lourenço 13'; R. Pinhal 14', 34'; J. Cabral 18'; Coimbra 21'; Filipe 30'	Referee: Özcan Sultanoğlu (Turkey)

==== Group 2 ====
Pos	Team	Pld	W	W+	WP	L	GF	GA	GD	Pts
1	Belarus	3	3	0	0	0	27	4	+23	9
2	Czechia	3	1	0	1	1	12	18	–6	4
3	Germany	3	1	0	0	2	10	14	–4	3
4	Turkey	3	0	0	0	3	10	23	–13	0

18 July 2025	Czechia	4–4 (a.e.t.) (5–4 p)	Germany
16:30	Trampota 1', 5', 18'; Salak 24'	Report	Widmann 11'; Olli 12'; Kaufmann 18'; Schulte 22'	Referee: Ingilab Mammadov (Azerbaijan)

18 July 2025	Turkey	1–12	Belarus
19:30	Uğur 28'	Report	Chaikouski 2'; Piatrouski 2', 17'; Bryshtel 3', 11', 23'; Bokach 8'; Ryabko 13', 36'; Kanstantsinau 24'; Drozd 29'; Hapon 32'	Referee: Nail Naghiyev (Azerbaijan)

19 July 2025	Belarus	6–1	Germany
16:30	Ryabko 5', 15'; Bokach 12'; Ustsinovich 14'; Hapon 27'; Chaikouski 32'	Report	Peterson 10'	Referee: Kakha Vasadze (Georgia)

19 July 2025	Czechia	6–5	Turkey
19:30	Trampota 1', 31'; Vales 11', 17', 28', 30'	Report	Ege 1', 1'; T. Özdemir 29'; Uğur 29'; Kocaman 30'	Referee: Ingilab Mammadov (Azerbaijan)

20 July 2025	Belarus	9–2	Czechia
18:00	Kanstantsinau 2'; Ryabko 7'; Bryshtel 8', 9', 34'; Bokach 10', 22'; Novikau 24'; Piatrouski 27'	Report	Trampota 16'; Vales 20'	Referee: Vitalij Gomolko (Lithuania)

20 July 2025	Germany	5–4	Turkey
19:30	Olli 8', 32'; Skeip 12'; Efe Lorenzo 19' (o.g.); Schulte 24'	Report	Oğuzhan 15'; Emrah 16'; Cengizhan 19'; Efe Lorenzo 32'	Referee: Ingilab Mammadov (Azerbaijan)

=== Awards ===
The following were presented after the conclusion of the final day's matches.

Stage Winners trophy	Top scorer(s)		Best player	Best goalkeeper
Belarus	(Switzerland) Philipp Borer	8 goals	(Belarus) Anatoliy Ryabko	(Portugal) Pedro Mano

== Stage 3 (Castellammare di Stabia, 25–27 July) ==
Matches are listed as local time in Castellammare di Stabia, CEST (UTC+2) and are those scheduled; actual kick-off times may somewhat differ.

All matches took place at Stabia Beach Arena, with a capacity of approximately 2,500, in tandem with stage 2 of the women's competition.

=== Division A ===
==== Group 1 ====
Pos	Team	Pld	W	W+	WP	L	GF	GA	GD	Pts
1	Italy (H)	3	3	0	0	0	17	5	+12	9
2	Denmark	3	2	0	0	1	10	11	–1	6
3	Czechia	3	1	0	0	2	7	12	–5	3
4	Estonia	3	0	0	0	3	8	14	−6	0

25 July 2025	Czechia	3–2	Estonia
15:00	Trampota 1', 9'; Körtvélyeši 12'	Report	Lilleorg 22', 30'	Referee: Raffaele Delvecchio (San Marino)

25 July 2025	Denmark	1–5	Italy
20:30	Frandsen 20'	Report	Casapieri 3'; Giordani 3'; Sciacca 5', 20'; Sassari 26'	Referee: Attila Balint (Romania)

26 July 2025	Czechia	2–3	Denmark
15:00	Valeš 21', 23'	Report	Wegeberg 9'; Jensen 18'; Dorph 35'	Referee: Moreno Francesco Longo (Italy)

26 July 2025	Italy	5–2	Estonia
20:30	Fazzini 8'; Remedi L. 11'; Remedi A. 23'; Josep Jr. 27'; Sciacca 35'	Report	Raku 8'; Marmor 23'	Referee: Oleg Cebotari (Moldova)

27 July 2025	Estonia	4–6	Denmark
17:45	Kallaste 15'; Lepik 20', 23'; Wegeberg 32' (o.g.)	Report	Lucht 5'; Wegeberg 28', 35'; Damm 32', 33'; Frandsen 34'

27 July 2025	Italy	7–2	Czechia
20:30	Remedi A. 7'; Santini 16'; Giordani 21', 32', 36', 36'; Alla 29'	Report	Pekarek 19'; Trampota 35'	Referee: José Pardeiro (Spain)

==== Group 2 ====
Pos	Team	Pld	W	W+	WP	L	GF	GA	GD	Pts
1	Switzerland	3	3	0	0	0	22	11	+11	9
2	Belarus	3	2	0	0	1	15	12	+3	6
3	Moldova	3	1	0	0	2	11	11	0	3
4	Latvia	3	0	0	0	3	3	17	−14	0

25 July 2025	Switzerland	5–2	Moldova
13:45	Hodel 1', 10'; Borer 5', 31'; J. Knöpfli 7'	Report	Sîrghi 18'; Cojocari 31'	Referee: Davide Innaurato (Italy)

25 July 2025	Latvia	0–3 w/o (Note: Latvia refused to fulfil their fixture against Belarus in protest of the Belarusian involvement in the Russian invasion of Ukraine. For administrative purposes, Belarus were awarded a 3–0 walkover win.)	Belarus
17:45		Report		Referee: Fiammetta Susanna (Italy)

26 July 2025	Switzerland	8–2	Latvia
13:45	J. Knöpfli 1'; Eliott 9', 28', 29'; Spacca 21'; Hodel 24', 31'; Borer 30'	Report	Rubenis 8'; Hohluks 9'	Referee: Stefania Bonnici (Malta)

26 July 2025	Belarus	5–3	Moldova
17:45	Kanstantsinau 19'; Novikau 25'; Ustsinovich 28'; Hapon 32'; Ryabko 35'	Report	Florea 12'; Sîrghi 14'; Vieru 21'	Referee: Raffaele Delvecchio (San Marino)

27 July 2025	Moldova	6–1	Latvia
13:45	Cojocari 4', 13', 17'; Rimkus 10' (o.g.); Vieru 14'; Eremia 29'	Report	Grīslis 17'	Referee: Attila Balint (Romania)

27 July 2025	Belarus	7–9	Switzerland
15:00	Ryabko 2'; Hapon 6', 24'; Novikau 18'; Drozd 18', 25'; Bokach 24'	Report	Borer 3'; J. Knöpfli 5'; Eliott 7', 19'; Gmür 7', 23'; Hodel 9', 22', 36'	Referee: Moreno Francesco Longo (Italy)

=== Awards ===
The following were presented after the conclusion of the final day's matches.

Stage Winners trophy	Top scorer(s)		Best player	Best goalkeeper
Italy	(Switzerland) Glenn Hodel	7 goals	(Italy) Marco Giordani	(Italy) Leandro Casapieri

=== Division B ===
The top three teams qualify for the Superfinal.

Pos	Team	Pld	W	W+	WP	L	GF	GA	GD	Pts
1	Kazakhstan	3	2	1	0	0	14	10	+4	8
2	Romania	3	2	0	0	1	15	11	+4	6
3	Malta	3	1	0	0	2	9	12	−4	3
4	Norway	3	0	0	0	3	12	16	−4	0

25 July 2025	Norway	2–3	Malta
11:15	Skotty 29'; Haga 33'	Report	Schembri 14'; Micallef 16', 28'	Referee: Moreno Francesco Longo (Italy)

25 July 2025	Kazakhstan	3–2 (a.e.t.)	Romania
12:30	Dering 17'; Malikov 29'; Kaizer 38'	Report	Toma 15'; Măci 21'	Referee: Jose Alberto Pardeiro Puente (Spain)

26 July 2025	Norway	4–6	Kazakhstan
11:15	Paulos 11'; Skotty 14'; Hellebust 24'; Dyngeland 33'	Report	Dering 4'; Kurbanov 7'; Kaizer 9', 23'; Shevchuk 11'; Minbayev 27'	Referee: Raffaele Delvecchio (San Marino)

26 July 2025	Romania	6–2	Malta
12:30	Andrei Paul 5'; Măci 14', 17', 18', 23'; Andrescu 31'	Report	Micallef 10'; Schembri 28'	Referee: Davide Innaurato (Italy)

27 July 2025	Malta	4–5	Kazakhstan
11:15	Caruana 5', 20'; Nezar 14', 21'	Report	Kurbanov 18'; Minbayev 22'; Demeshko 26'; Dering 27'; Kaizer 35'	Referee: Tomas Nejedly (Czechia)

27 July 2025	Romania	7–6	Norway
12:30	Măci 10', 19', 25'; Andrei Paul 16'; Suciu 24'; Poste 27'; Toma 28'	Report	Skotty 6', 34'; Paulos 13', 32'; Ljosa 26'; Gaare 27'	Referee: Kanstantsin Pshonny (Belarus)

=== Awards ===
The following were presented after the conclusion of the final day's matches.

Stage Winners trophy	Top scorer(s)		Best player	Best goalkeeper
Kazakhstan	(Romania) Marian Măciucă	8 goals	(Kazakhstan) Mikhail Kaizer	(Romania) Andrei Paul

== Stage 4 (Chișinău, 1–3 August) ==
Matches are listed as local time in Chișinău, EEST (UTC+3) and are those scheduled; actual kick-off times may somewhat differ.

All matches took place at the FMF Beach Soccer Arena (also known as the Orange Arena for sponsporship reasons), with a capacity of 1,024.

=== Division A ===
==== Group 1 ====
Pos	Team	Pld	W	W+	WP	L	GF	GA	GD	Pts
1	Spain	3	3	0	0	0	19	9	+10	9
2	Poland	3	1	1	0	1	11	9	+2	5
3	Denmark	3	1	0	0	2	8	11	–3	3
4	Moldova (H)	3	0	0	0	3	11	20	–9	0

1 August 2025	Spain	3–1	Poland
15:30	Chiky 3'; Gatica 17'; D. Ardil 22'	Report	Brochocki 3'	Referee: Saverio Bottalico (Italy)

1 August 2025	Denmark	3–2	Moldova
20:00	Lucht 14'; Pilgaard 20'; Hoedeman 26'	Report	Sîrghi 14'; Cojocari 26'	Referee: Matthieu Dor (France)

2 August 2025	Spain	5–4	Denmark
15:30	Brian 5', 6'; Chiky 10', 30'; D. Ardil 15'	Report	Damm 3'; Hoedeman 3'; Lucht 10'; Frandsen 27'	Referee: Jurijs Ivusins (Latvia)

2 August 2025	Moldova	5–6 (a.e.t.)	Poland
20:00	Gherganov 18'; Cojocari 20'; Sîrghi 30', 30'; Ignat 36'	Report	Niesler 11'; Fudała 15', 25', 30'; Witkowski 31'; Błaszczyk 37' (e.t.)	Referee: José Pardeiro (Spain)

3 August 2025	Poland	4–1	Denmark
17:00	Niesler 3'; Witkowski 17'; Pietrasiak 19'; Mańka 35'	Report	Damm 3'	Referee: Matthieu Dor (France)

3 August 2025	Moldova	4–11	Spain
20:00	Cojocari 6', 22'; Vieru 20'; Ignat 23'	Report	Gatica 10'; P. Lopez 14'; A. Otero 16'; Brian 18', 22'; Chiky 19', 23', 29'; J.Hermosa 32'; Suli Batis 32', 33'	Referee: Lukasz Ostrowski (Poland)

==== Group 2 ====
Pos	Team	Pld	W	W+	WP	L	GF	GA	GD	Pts
1	Italy	3	3	0	0	0	21	3	+18	9
2	Ukraine	3	2	0	0	1	14	11	+3	6
3	France	3	1	0	0	2	10	14	–4	3
4	Latvia	3	0	0	0	3	4	21	–17	0

1 August 2025	Latvia	0–9	Italy
17:00		Report	Remedi A. 9', 21', 25'; Sciacca 11'; Fazzini 13', 31'; Josep Jr. 20'; Sassari 24'; Giordani 36'	Referee: Lukasz Ostrowski (Poland)

1 August 2025	Ukraine	7–2	France
18:30	Maksymets 6'; Levchenko I. 24', 27', 24'; Voitenko 27', 34', 35'	Report	Belhomme 31'; Salazar 35'	Referee: José Pardeiro (Spain)

2 August 2025	Italy	4–1	France
17:00	Sassari 12'; Giordani 12'; Santini 21'; Fazzini 22'	Report	Laasami 26'	Referee: Oleg Cebotari (Moldova)

2 August 2025	Ukraine	5–1	Latvia
18:30	Voitenko 10'; Levchenko I. 10'; Samoilenko 18'; Voitok 21'; Korniichuk 31'	Report	Grislis 8'	Referee: Saverio Bottalico (Italy)

3 August 2025	France	7–3	Latvia
15:30	Segura 3', 34'; Laasami 11', 21', 32'; Guerin 13', 17'	Report	Rubenis 26'; Spunde 29'; Vasiljevs 35'	Referee: Dmytro Dudka (Ukraine)

3 August 2025	Italy	8–2	Ukraine
18:30	Sciacca 4'; Korniichuk 13' (o.g.); Giordani 19'; Sassari 23', 36'; Remedi A. 24'; Josep Jr. 27'; Santini 32'	Report	Borsuk A. 9'; Voitenko 18'	Referee: José Pardeiro (Spain)

=== Awards ===
The following were presented after the conclusion of the final day's matches.

Stage Winners trophy	Top scorer(s)		Best player	Best goalkeeper
Italy	(Spain) Chiky Ardil	6 goals	(Italy) Josep Junior	(Italy) Leandro Casapieri

== Cumulative standings ==
Division A

At the end of the regular season, the top eight teams advance to the Superfinal, whilst the bottom four are consigned to the relegation play-outs.

Pos	Team	Pld	W	W+	WP	L	GF	GA	GD	Pts	Qualification
1	Italy	6	6	0	0	0	38	8	+30	18	Advance to the Superfinal
2	Spain	6	6	0	0	0	43	16	+27	18	Advance to the Superfinal
3	Belarus	6	5	0	0	1	42	16	+26	15	Advance to the Superfinal
4	Switzerland	6	5	0	0	1	42	20	+22	15	Advance to the Superfinal
5	Portugal	6	5	0	0	1	37	15	+22	15	Advance to the Superfinal
6	Ukraine	6	4	0	0	2	25	19	+6	12	Advance to the Superfinal
7	France	6	4	0	0	2	26	23	+3	12	Advance to the Superfinal
8	Denmark	6	3	0	0	3	18	22	−4	9	Advance to the Superfinal
9	Poland	6	2	1	0	3	20	16	+4	8	
10	Czechia	6	2	0	1	3	19	30	−11	7	
11	Germany	6	2	0	0	4	19	24	−5	6	
12	Moldova	6	1	0	0	5	22	31	–9	3	
13	Georgia	6	1	0	0	5	15	52	−37	3	Consigned to the relegation play-outs
14	Estonia	6	0	0	0	6	10	22	−12	0	Consigned to the relegation play-outs
15	Turkey	6	0	0	0	6	18	49	−31	0	Consigned to the relegation play-outs
16	Latvia	6	0	0	0	6	7	38	−31	0	Consigned to the relegation play-outs

== Promotion Final (Viareggio, 10–14 September) ==
Matches are listed as local time in Viareggio, CEST (UTC+2) and are those scheduled; actual kick-off times may differ somewhat.

The top two teams are promoted to the 2026 EBSL Division A.

=== Group stage ===
==== Draw ====
The draw to divide the teams into their respective groups took place on 11 August 2025.

Key: Advance to –	Semi-finals /	5th place match /	(H) Hosts

==== Group A ====
Pos	Team	Pld	W	W+	WP	L	GF	GA	GD	Pts
1	Lithuania	2	2	0	0	0	5	2	+3	6
2	Azerbaijan	2	1	0	0	1	6	6	0	3
3	Belgium	2	0	0	0	2	5	8	–3	0

10 September 2025	Lithuania	3–1	Belgium
14:00	Makutunovičius 2'; Giedraitis 17'; Navickas 18'	Report	T. Depotbecker 6'	Referee: Malte Gerhardt (Germany)

11 September 2025	Azerbaijan	5–4	Belgium
14:00	Elchin 7'; Sabir 9', 26'; Sahib 26'; Ramil 29'	Report	Ennya 3', 28'; T. Depotbecker 10'; Cardon 16'	Referee: Jose Pardeiro (Spain)

12 September 2025	Lithuania	2–1	Azerbaijan
10:15	Novičkov 7'; Giedraitis 27'	Report	Kamran 30'	Referee: Moreno Longo (Italy)

==== Group B ====
Pos	Team	Pld	W	W+	WP	L	GF	GA	GD	Pts
1	Romania	2	1	1	0	0	11	7	+4	5
2	Kazakhstan	2	1	0	0	1	10	8	+2	3
3	Malta	2	0	0	0	2	8	14	–6	0

10 September 2025	Kazakhstan	7–4	Malta
12:45	Yershin 2'; Kaizer 4', 14'; Dering 12'; Minbayev 13'; Demeshko 13', 18'	Report	Schembri 13', 14', 29'; Nezar 24'	Referee: Mehdi Sayoud (Belgium)

11 September 2025	Romania	7–4	Malta
12:45	Toma 15'; Măci 22', 24'; Suciu 24'; Boata 25'; Andrescu 28'; Bolat 32'	Report	Schembri 10'; Agius 12'; Nezar 35', 36'	Referee: Saverio Bottalico (Italy)

12 September 2025	Kazakhstan	3–4 (a.e.t.)	Romania
09:00	Minbayev 16'; Shevchuk 21'; Kaizer 23'	Report	Toma 3', 19', 39' (e.t.); Bolat 9'	Referee: Mehdi Sayoud (Belgium)

=== Semi-finals ===
13 September 2025
10:15

Lithuania	0–0 (a.e.t.)	Kazakhstan
	Report
Penalties
	3–0

Referee: Jose Pardeiro (Spain)

13 September 2025
11:30

Romania	5–3	Azerbaijan
Boata 6', 9'; Andrei-Paul 12'; Măci 14'; Toma 29'	Report	Sahib 9', 26'; Jomard 33'

Referee: Moreno Longo (Italy)

=== Finals ===
==== 5th place match ====
13 September 2025
09:00

Belgium	8–3	Malta
Ennya 11', 12'; Tilly 14'; Rose 18'; Resmond 21', 22', 30'; Coquelle 34'	Report	Nanapere 14', 33'; Nezar 35'

Referee: Raffaele Delvecchio (San Marino)

==== 3rd place match ====
14 September 2025
09:00

Kazakhstan	1–7	Azerbaijan
Kurbanov 13'	Report	Elchin 10'; Kamran 12'; Bayram 14'; Sahib 23'; Orkhan 24'; Ramil 26'; Jomard 29'

Referee: Mehdi Sayoud (Belgium)

==== Championship match ====
14 September 2025
14:00

Romania	3–4	Lithuania
Măci 2', 35'; Toma 15'	Report	Lebedevas 8'; Makutunovičius 29', 30'; Kliukoit 30'

Referee: Annett Unterbeck (Germany)

=== Awards ===
Winners trophy	Top scorer(s)		Best player	Best goalkeeper
Lithuania	(Romania) Vincene Toma	6 goals	(Lithuania) Mantas Makutunovičius	(Lithuania) Modestas Kulikauskas

=== Final standings ===
Pos	Team	Result
1	Lithuania	Promoted to 2026 EBSL Division A
2	Romania	Promoted to 2026 EBSL Division A
3	Azerbaijan	Remain in Division B
4	Kazakhstan	Remain in Division B
5	Belgium	Remain in Division B
6	Malta	Remain in Division B

== Relegation play-outs (Viareggio, 9–11 September) ==
Matches are listed as local time in Viareggio, CEST (UTC+2) and are those scheduled; actual kick-off times may differ somewhat.

The two teams that finish bottom are relegated to the 2026 EBSL Division B; the top two retain their place in Division A.

Key: Outcome –	Relegated to 2026 Division B

Pos	Team	Pld	W	W+	WP	L	GF	GA	GD	Pts
1	Estonia	3	2	0	0	1	14	8	+6	6
2	Turkey	3	2	0	0	1	13	7	+6	6
3	Latvia	3	1	0	0	2	7	16	–9	3
4	Georgia	3	1	0	0	2	6	9	–3	3

9 September 2025	Estonia	4–3	Turkey
09:00	Lepik 2', 36'; Lilleorg 21'; Raku 34'	Report	Oğzuhan 22'; Emrah 23'; Palm 33' (o.g.)	Referee: Jose Pardeiro (Spain)

9 September 2025	Latvia	3–2	Georgia
10:15	Skuratovics 9'; Gusarins 19'; Hohluks 29'	Report	Lomidze 16'; M. Shamiladze 16'	Referee: Vladimir Tashkov (Bulgaria)

10 September 2025	Estonia	8–2	Latvia
10:15	Lepik 1', 19', 22', 26'; Arula 5', 9'; Vihmoja 20', 27'	Report	Josifovs 10'; Skuratovics 25'	Referee: Sergio Gomes (Portugal)

10 September 2025	Georgia	1–4	Turkey
11:30	G. Makharadze 29'	Report	Serkan 18'; Cengizhan 22'; Hüseyin 32'; T. Özdemir 34'	Referee: Moreno Longo (Italy)

11 September 2025	Turkey	6–2	Latvia
10:15	Efe Lorenzo 8', 25'; Emrah 14', 35'; Hüseyin 17'; Ferhat 19'	Report	Grīslis 21', 35'	Referee: Raffaele Delvecchi (San Marino)

11 September 2025	Georgia	3–2	Estonia
11:30	M. Shamiladze 7'; Todadze 21'; G. Makharadze 27'	Report	Lepik 14'; Lilleorg 36'	Referee: Mehdi Sayoud (Belgium)

== Superfinal (Viareggio, 9–14 September) ==
Matches are listed as local time in Viareggio, CEST (UTC+2) and are those scheduled; actual kick-off times may differ somewhat.

All matches take place at Matteo Valenti Beach Stadium, with a capacity of 1,000.

=== Group stage ===
==== Draw ====
The draw to divide the teams into their respective groups took place on 11 August 2025.

Key: Advance to –	Semi-finals /	5th place match /	7th place match /	(H) Hosts

==== Group A ====
Pos	Team	Pld	W	W+	WP	L	GF	GA	GD	Pts
1	Italy (H)	3	2	0	1	0	11	7	+4	7
2	Belarus	3	2	0	0	1	10	8	+2	6
3	Portugal	3	1	0	0	2	10	12	–2	3
4	France	3	0	0	0	3	10	14	–4	0

9 September 2025	Belarus	4–3	Portugal
14:00	Hapon 11', 29'; Piatrouski 27'; Novikau 27'	Report	Bê Martins 5'; A. Lourenço 13', 26'	Referee: Malte Gerhardt (Germany)

9 September 2025	France	4–4 (a.e.t.) (3–5 p)	Italy
18:00	Gosselin 1'; Bru 8'; Laassami 21'; Constant 38' (e.t.)	Report	Josep Jr. 7'; Sciacca 16', 30'; Gean Pietro 39' (e.t.)	Referee: Vitalij Gomolko (Lithuania)

10 September 2025	Belarus	6–4	France
15:30	Bryshtel 6', 34'; Piatrouski 11'; Ryabko 14'; Hapon 18'; Hardzetski 21'	Report	Bru 1'; Guerin 7'; Laassami 17'; Belhomme 20'	Referee: Annett Unterbeck (Germany)

10 September 2025	Italy	6–3	Portugal
18:00	Casapieri 12'; Fazzini 17', 34'; Josep Jr. 21', 34'; Remedi L. 36'	Report	Vasco 17'; Léo Martins 34', 35'	Referee: Lukasz Ostrowski (Poland)

12 September 2025	Portugal	4–2	France
14:00	D. Algarvio 5', 6'; Léo Martins 28', 34'	Report	Guerin 4'; Gosselin 14'	Referee: Vitalij Gomolko (Lithuania)

12 September 2025	Italy	1–0	Belarus
18:00	Casapieri 23'	Report		Referee: Sergio Gomes (Portugal)

==== Group B ====
Pos	Team	Pld	W	W+	WP	L	GF	GA	GD	Pts
1	Spain	3	3	0	0	0	22	13	+9	9
2	Ukraine	3	1	0	1	1	15	15	0	4
3	Switzerland	3	1	0	0	2	14	17	–3	3
4	Denmark	3	0	0	0	3	13	19	–6	0

9 September 2025	Switzerland	4–5	Ukraine
11:30	Hodel 24'; Borer 30', 33' (pen.), 35'	Report	Ross 7'; Pashko 10', 19'; Glutskiy 29'; Voitok 32'	Referee: Saverio Bottalico (Italy)

9 September 2025	Denmark	5–7	Spain
15:30	Damm 2', 29'; Wegeberg 3', 7'; Hansen 19'	Report	Oliver 1'; Brian 6', 15'; Antonio 7', 26'; Kuman 27'; Ramy 29'	Referee: Sergio Gomes (Portugal)

11 September 2025	Switzerland	6–2	Denmark
15:30	Steinemann 17', 18'; Hodel 31', 33'; Wegeberg 32' (o.g.); J. Knöpfli 36'	Report	Ryding 9'; Jensen 20'	Referee: Vitalij Gomolko (Lithuania)

11 September 2025	Spain	5–4	Ukraine
16:45	Brian 1', 1'; D. Ardil 13', 28'; Suli Batis 32'	Report	Samoilenko 14'; Yarmak 19', 21'; Maksymets 19'	Referee: Matthieu Dor (France)

12 September 2025	Ukraine	6–6 (a.e.t.) (6–5 p)	Denmark
11:30	Ross 9', 21'; Nerush 20', 22'; Voitok 23'; Potapov 28'	Report	Jensen 2'; Madsen 4', 19'; Stubgaard 21'; Damm 29'; Wegeberg 29'	Referee: Malte Gerhardt (Germany)

12 September 2025	Spain	10–4	Switzerland
15:30	D. Ardil 1'; Chiky 1'; Suli Batis 4', 5', 18', 28'; Ramy 12', 35'; Oliver 14'; Ridu 32'	Report	Borer 20', 21', 22'; Steinemann 25'	Referee: Vladimir Tashkov (Bulgaria)

=== Semi-finals ===
13 September 2025
16:45

Spain	6–3	Belarus
D. Ardil 2', 6'; Brian 2'; Oliver 12'; Kuman 15'; Chiky 33'	Report	Hapon 9'; Bryshtel 27'; Chaikouski 32'

Referee: Vladimir Tashkov (Bulgaria)

13 September 2025
18:00

Italy	4–1	Ukraine
Sassari 16', 32'; Josep Jr. 20', 25'	Report	Maksymets 26'

Referee: Lukasz Ostrowski (Poland)

=== Finals ===
==== 7th place match ====
14 September 2025
10:15

France	4–5 (a.e.t.)	Denmark
Tillet 7'; Belhomme 14'; Bru 33'; Gosselin 36'	Report	Hansen 7'; Gosselin 10' (o.g.); Madsen 16'; Pilgaard 20'; Dorph 38' (e.t.)

Referee: Malte Gerhardt (Germany)

==== 5th place match ====
14 September 2025
11:30

Portugal	9–3	Switzerland
Bê Martins 1', 34'; J. Cabral 12'; Bernardo L. 23', 35'; Diogo Dias 25'; Léo Martins 26', 27'; D. Algarvio 31'	Report	Steinemann 15'; J. Knöpfli 26'; Hodel 27'

Referee: Jose Pardeiro (Spain)

==== 3rd place match ====
14 September 2025
15:15

Belarus	3–0 w/o (Note: Ukraine refused to fulfil their fixture against Belarus in protest of the Belarusian involvement in the Russian invasion of Ukraine. For administrative purposes, Belarus were awarded a 3–0 walkover win.)	Ukraine
	Report

==== Championship match ====
14 September 2025
18:00

Spain	5–8	Italy
Chiky 1', 24', 35', 35'; Ramy 17'	Report	Sassari 13'; Remedi A. 13', 15', 30'; Genovali 23'; Josep Jr. 28'; Alla 31'; Shalabi 32'

Referee: Sergio Soares (Portugal)

=== Awards ===
==== Winners trophy ====
2025 Euro Beach Soccer League
Champions

Italy
Fourth title

==== Individual awards ====
Top scorer(s)
(Italy) Josep Junior (Note: Chiky Ardil (Spain), Léo Martins (Portugal) and Philipp Borer (Switzerland) also scored six goals however did not officially share the award for reasons unknown.)
6 goals
Best player
(Italy) Alessandro Remedi
Best goalkeeper
(Italy) Leandro Casapieri

=== Final standings ===
Pos	Team	Result
1	Italy	EBSL Champions (4th title)
2	Spain	Runners-up
3	Belarus	Third place
4	Ukraine	
5	Portugal	
6	Switzerland	
7	Denmark	
8	France	

== See also ==
- 2025 Women's Euro Beach Soccer League
