= 2026 Euro Winners Cup =

Tournament details
- Host country: Portugal
- Dates: 7–14 June
- Teams: 35 (from 1 confederation)
- Venues: 4 (in 1 host city)

Final positions
- Champions: BSC 54 (1st title)
- Runners-up: Minsk
- Third place: Pisa
- Fourth place: Kfar Qassem

Origins of the clubs in the 2026 Euro Winners Cup group stage.
Groups key: A; B; C; D; E; F; G; H; I.

The 2026 Euro Winners Cup was the fourteenth edition of the Euro Winners Cup (EWC), an annual continental beach soccer tournament for men's top-division European clubs. The championship is widely viewed as beach soccer's rudimentary version of the better known UEFA Champions League in its parent sport, association football.

Organised by Beach Soccer Worldwide (BSWW), the tournament was held in Nazaré, Portugal, from 7 to 14 June.

The event began with a round robin group stage. At its conclusion, the best teams progressed to the knockout stage, a series of single elimination games to determine the winners, starting with the Round of 16 and ending with the final. Consolation matches are also played to determine other final rankings.

Catania were the defending champions but did not enter this year due to the club's dissolution in April 2026. The tournament was won by BSC 54 from Baden, Switzerland, who claimed their first title.

== Teams ==
=== Qualification ===
Qualification for the competition is similar to the UEFA Champions League, whereby clubs qualify via their country’s national beach soccer league (being a country which is a member association of UEFA).

The exact number of clubs which qualify from each association depends on the perceived "strength" of their country’s league. BSWW determine the strength of each league by analysing the performance of all clubs in the EWC on a country-by-country basis over the previous five editions; a points-based ranking is produced from the data. From the most recent edition of their respective leagues, the best performing nations in the ranking are permitted to enter multiple top placing clubs (being their league champions and one or more runners-up), whilst the worst performing are allowed to enter just one club (being their league champions). This is similar in concept to that of the UEFA coefficient ranking. The top placing clubs from the previous year's Euro Winners Challenge also qualify.

Eligible clubs may choose not to, or are unable to participate. Thus, in reality, some countries fill their quota with clubs placed lower down in their league, don’t claim all their slots, sometimes fill none of their slots at all, and sometimes unclaimed slots are transferred to other associations at the discretion of BSWW.

=== Entrants ===
35 clubs from 23 different nations entered the event.

In accordance with sanctions imposed by FIFA and UEFA in 2022 in response to the Russian invasion of Ukraine, clubs from Russia remain banned from entering this year.

The draw to split the teams into nine groups of four for the group stage took place on 13 May 2026. An unnamed 36th team was included in the draw but never materialised.

Participating clubs in the 2026 Euro Winners Cup
Portugal (3)	O Sótão (H)	Israel (2)	Kfar Qassem	England (1)	Portsmouth
Portugal (3)	Nazaré 2022	Israel (2)	Rosh HaAyin	Finland (1)	Hobby
Portugal (3)	Alfarim (Chl)	Italy (2)	Pisa	Greece (1)	Napoli Patron
France (3)	Avenir	Italy (2)	Viareggio	Hungary (1)	Bonyhád
France (3)	Cévennes (Chl)	Turkey (2)	Alanya Belediyespor	Malta (1)	Sliema
France (3)	Montpellier	Turkey (2)	Manavgat Belediyespor	Moldova (1)	Nistru Chișinău
Germany (3)	Bavaria Beach Bazis	Ukraine (2)	Partizan	Netherlands (1)	Altena
Germany (3)	Beach Royals Düsseldorf	Ukraine (2)	Sunrise Kyiv	Norway (1)	KFUM Stavanger
Germany (3)	Rostocker Robben	Belarus (1)	Minsk	Poland (1)	KP Łódź
Spain (3)	Cádiz	Bulgaria (1)	SA-MVR Sofia	Slovakia (1)	Hustý
Spain (3)	Huelva	Cyprus (1)	Pafos	Switzerland (1)	BSC 54
Spain (3)	Atlético Torroxeño	Czechia (1)	Bosnia Teplice		

Key: H: Host club \ TH: Title holders \ Chl: Qualified via the 2025 Euro Winners Challenge

== Group stage ==
All eight group winners, along with the five best runners-up, progress to the round of 16 (total of 14 teams).

The worst four runners-up progress to a play-off round to decide the final two round of 16 berths.

All third-placed and fourth-placed teams are consigned to a set of consolation matches to determine final placements.

Key

- Qualification to the round of 16
- Qualification to the play-off round
- Consigned to placement matches
- Withdrew

=== Group A ===
Pos	Team	Pld	W	W+	WP	L	GF	GA	GD	Pts
1	O Sótão (H)	2	1	0	1	0	10	4	+6	4
2	KP Łódź	3	1	0	0	2	11	8	+3	3
3	Rostocker Robben	3	1	0	0	2	6	15	−9	3

Source: BSWW
(H) Host

7 June	O Sótão (Portugal)	7–1	(Germany) Rostocker Robben
8 June	Rostocker Robben (Germany)	1–7	(Poland) KP Łódź
8 June	O Sótão (Portugal)	3–3 (4–2 p.)	(Poland) KP Łódź
9 June	KP Łódź (Poland)	1–4	(Germany) Rostocker Robben

=== Group B ===
Pos	Team	Pld	W	W+	WP	L	GF	GA	GD	Pts
1	Viareggio	3	3	0	0	0	21	7	+14	9
2	Kfar Qassem	3	2	0	0	1	26	9	+17	6
3	Bavaria Beach Bazis	3	1	0	0	2	13	18	−5	3
4	Sliema	3	0	0	0	3	5	31	−26	0

Source: BSWW

7 June	Viareggio (Italy)	5–2	(Germany) Bavaria Beach Bazis
7 June	Sliema (Malta)	0–13	(Israel) Kfar Qassem
8 June	Viareggio (Italy)	11–2	(Malta) Sliema
8 June	Kfar Qassem (Israel)	10–4	(Germany) Bavaria Beach Bazis
9 June	Bavaria Beach Bazis (Germany)	7–3	(Malta) Sliema
9 June	Kfar Qassem (Israel)	3–5	(Italy) Viareggio

=== Group C ===
Pos	Team	Pld	W	W+	WP	L	GF	GA	GD	Pts
1	Napoli Patron	3	3	0	0	0	15	7	+8	9
2	BSC 54	3	2	0	0	1	27	15	+12	6
3	Bosnia Teplice	3	1	0	0	2	9	22	−13	3
4	Alfarim	3	0	0	0	3	10	17	−7	0

Source: BSWW

7 June	Napoli Patron (Greece)	5–4	(Switzerland) BSC 54
7 June	Bosnia Teplice (Czech Republic)	4–2	(Portugal) Alfarim
8 June	Napoli Patron (Greece)	6–0	(Czech Republic) Bosnia Teplice
8 June	Alfarim (Portugal)	5–9	(Switzerland) BSC 54
9 June	BSC 54 (Switzerland)	14–5	(Czech Republic) Bosnia Teplice
9 June	Alfarim (Portugal)	3–4	(Greece) Napoli Patron

=== Group D ===
Pos	Team	Pld	W	W+	WP	L	GF	GA	GD	Pts
1	Pisa	2	2	0	0	0	17	7	+10	6
2	KFUM Stavanger	3	1	0	0	2	12	10	+2	3
3	Portsmouth	3	1	0	0	2	10	22	−12	3
4	Atlético Torroxeño	0	0	0	0	0	0	0	0	0

Source: BSWW

7 June	Pisa (Italy)	13–4	(England) Portsmouth
8 June	Portsmouth (England)	3–2	(Norway) KFUM Stavanger
8 June	Pisa (Italy)	4–3	(Norway) KFUM Stavanger
9 June	Portsmouth (England)	3–7	(Norway) KFUM Stavanger

=== Group E ===
Pos	Team	Pld	W	W+	WP	L	GF	GA	GD	Pts
1	Rosh HaAyin	3	3	0	0	0	16	4	+12	9
2	Cádiz	3	2	0	0	1	18	9	+9	6
3	Manavgat Belediyespor	3	1	0	0	2	3	16	−13	3
4	Nazaré 2022	3	0	0	0	3	7	15	−8	0

Source: BSWW

7 June	Nazaré 2022 (Portugal)	3–6	(Spain) Cádiz
7 June	Manavgat Belediyespor (Turkey)	0–4	(Israel) Rosh HaAyin
8 June	Nazaré 2022 (Portugal)	2–3	(Turkey) Manavgat Belediyespor
8 June	Rosh HaAyin (Israel)	6–2	(Spain) Cádiz
9 June	Cádiz (Spain)	10–0	(Turkey) Manavgat Belediyespor
9 June	Rosh HaAyin (Israel)	6–2	(Portugal) Nazaré 2022

=== Group F ===
Pos	Team	Pld	W	W+	WP	L	GF	GA	GD	Pts
1	Pafos	3	2	1	0	0	32	9	+23	8
2	Cévennes	3	2	0	0	1	20	14	+6	6
3	SA-MVR Sofia	3	1	0	0	2	14	22	−8	3
4	Altena	3	0	0	0	3	9	30	−21	0

Source: BSWW

7 June	Pafos (Cyprus)	16–0	(Netherlands) Altena
7 June	Cévennes (France)	8–3	(Bulgaria) SA-MVR Sofia
8 June	Pafos (Cyprus)	9–4	(Bulgaria) SA-MVR Sofia
8 June	Cévennes (France)	7–4	(Netherlands) Altena
9 June	Cévennes (France)	5–7 (a.e.t)	(Cyprus) Pafos
9 June	SA-MVR Sofia (Bulgaria)	7–5	(Netherlands) Altena

=== Group G ===
Pos	Team	Pld	W	W+	WP	L	GF	GA	GD	Pts
1	Huelva	3	2	1	0	0	19	15	+4	8
2	Partizan	3	2	0	0	1	19	11	+8	6
3	Hustý	3	1	0	0	2	16	17	−1	3
4	Alanya Belediyespor	3	0	0	0	3	8	19	−11	0

Source: BSWW

7 June	Hustý (Slovakia)	8–3	(Turkey) Alanya Belediyespor
7 June	Partizan (Ukraine)	6–7 (a.e.t)	(Spain) Huelva
8 June	Hustý (Slovakia)	2–7	(Ukraine) Partizan
8 June	Huelva (Spain)	5–3	(Turkey) Alanya Belediyespor
9 June	Alanya Belediyespor (Turkey)	2–6	(Ukraine) Partizan
9 June	Huelva (Spain)	7–6	(Slovakia) Hustý

=== Group H ===
Pos	Team	Pld	W	W+	WP	L	GF	GA	GD	Pts
1	Minsk	3	3	0	0	0	25	7	+18	9
2	Beach Royals Düsseldorf	3	2	0	0	1	21	13	+8	6
3	Montpellier	3	1	0	0	2	14	16	−2	3
4	Hobby	3	0	0	0	3	9	33	−24	0

Source: BSWW

7 June	Hobby (Finland)	2–8	(France) Montpellier
7 June	Minsk (Belarus)	4–3	(Germany) Beach Royals Düsseldorf
8 June	Hobby (Finland)	3–14	(Belarus) Minsk
8 June	Beach Royals Düsseldorf (Germany)	7–5	(France) Montpellier
9 June	Montpellier (France)	1–7	(Belarus) Minsk
9 June	Beach Royals Düsseldorf (Germany)	11–4	(Finland) Hobby

=== Group I ===
Pos	Team	Pld	W	W+	WP	L	GF	GA	GD	Pts
1	Sunrise Kyiv	3	3	0	0	0	22	5	+17	9
2	Bonyhád	3	2	0	0	1	10	11	−1	6
3	Avenir	3	0	0	1	2	6	11	−5	1
4	Nistru Chișinău	3	0	0	0	3	6	17	−11	0

Source: BSWW

7 June	Bonyhád (Hungary)	6–2	(Moldova) Nistru Chișinău
7 June	Avenir (France)	2–6	(Ukraine) Sunrise Kyiv
8 June	Bonyhád (Hungary)	3–2	(France) Avenir
8 June	Sunrise Kyiv (Ukraine)	9–2	(Moldova) Nistru Chișinău
9 June	Nistru Chișinău (Moldova)	2–2 (1–3 p.)	(France) Avenir
9 June	Sunrise Kyiv (Ukraine)	7–1	(Hungary) Bonyhád

== Placement matches ==
Matches take place on 10 June.

33rd place	Hobby (Finland)	5–6	(Malta) Sliema
31st place	Nistru Chișinău (Moldova)	7–4	(Netherlands) Altena
29th place	Nazaré 2022 (Portugal)	2–7	(Turkey) Alanya Belediyespor
27th place	Avenir (France)	2–5	(Portugal) Alfarim
25th place	Bosnia Teplice (Czech Republic)	7–6 (a.e.t.)	(Turkey) Manavgat Belediyespor
23rd place	Rostocker Robben (Germany)	5–1	(England) Portsmouth
21st place	Bavaria Beach Bazis (Germany)	5–1	(Bulgaria) SA-MVR Sofia
19th place	Hustý (Slovakia)	7–2	(France) Montpellier

== Knockout stage ==
=== Play-off round ===
The two winners qualify for the Round of 16.

Play-offs for Round of 16
10 June; Report
(Hungary) Bonyhád (a.e.t.)	6
(Poland) KP Łódź	4
10 June; Report
(France) Cévennes	6
(Norway) KFUM Stavanger	3

Qualified for Round of 16
(Hungary) Bonyhád
(France) Cévennes

17th place match
11 June; Report
(Poland) KP Łódź	9
(Norway) KFUM Stavanger	2

=== Bracket ===
Round of 16 losers placement
15th place – 12 June; Report
(Ukraine) Partizan	6
(Hungary) Bonyhád	4
13th place – 12 June; Report
(Spain) Cádiz	1
(Spain) Huelva	2
11th place – 12 June; Report
(Cyprus) Pafos	1
(Greece) Napoli Patron	4
9th place – 12 June; Report
(Israel) Rosh HaAyin	8
(Ukraine) Sunrise Kyiv	5

Round of 16
11 June; Report
(Italy) Pisa	6
(Ukraine) Partizan	5
11 June; Report
(Cyprus) Pafos	2
(Portugal) O Sótão	6
11 June; Report
(Belarus) Minsk (a.e.t.)	5
(Hungary) Bonyhád	4
11 June; Report
(Italy) Viareggio	4
(Spain) Cádiz	3
11 June; Report
(Israel) Rosh HaAyin	3
(Germany) Beach Royals	5
11 June; Report
(Spain) Huelva	1
(Switzerland) BSC 54	7
11 June; Report
(Ukraine) Sunrise Kyiv	1
(France) Cévennes	5
11 June; Report
(Greece) Napoli Patron	6
(Israel) Kfar Qassem	7

Quarterfinals
12 June; Report
(Italy) Pisa	7
(Portugal) O Sótão	5
12 June; Report
(Belarus) Minsk	4
(Italy) Viareggio	1
12 June; Report
(Germany) Beach Royals	5
(Switzerland) BSC 54	9
12 June; Report
(France) Cévennes	2
(Israel) Kfar Qassem	6

Semi-finals
13 June; Report
(Italy) Pisa	1 (4)
(Belarus) Minsk (p)	1 (5)
13 June; Report
(Switzerland) BSC 54	6
(Israel) Kfar Qassem	5
5th–8th semi-finals
13 June; Report
(Portugal) O Sótão	7
(Italy) Viareggio	3
13 June; Report
(Germany) Beach Royals	7
(France) Cévennes	4

Final
14 June; Report
(Belarus) Minsk	4
(Switzerland) BSC 54	6
3rd place match
14 June; Report
(Italy) Pisa	9
(Israel) Kfar Qassem	6
5th place match
14 June; Report
(Portugal) O Sótão	8
(Germany) Beach Royals	4
7th place match
14 June; Report
(Italy) Viareggio	2
(France) Cévennes	5

== See also ==
- 2026 Women's Euro Winners Cup
- 2025–26 UEFA Futsal Champions League
