= Beach Soccer Worldwide =

International governing body for the sport of beach soccer

- Abbreviation: BSWW
- Formation: 1994 (founding partners); 25 October 2000 (merger)
- Type: International sport federation
- Headquarters: Barcelona, Spain
- Region served: Worldwide
- Members: 211 national associations
- Official languages: English
- President: Joan Cuscó
- Vice-president: Gabino Renales
- Affiliations: FIFA, International Olympic Committee
- Staff: <50
- Website: www.beachsoccer.com

Beach Soccer Worldwide (BSWW) is the organisation responsible for the founding and growth of the association football-based sport of beach soccer. The founding partners of BSWW codified the rules of beach soccer in 1992, with BSWW as it is known today having been officially founded in late 2000 as a singular institution to develop the sport and organise international beach soccer competitions across the globe, primarily between national teams. The company is recognised as playing the biggest role in helping to establish the rules of beach soccer and to spread and evolve the sport around the world, as cited by FIFA, who took on governing body status of the sport from BSWW in 2005. Having established the sport's key regulations, FIFA acknowledged BSWW's framework, making their rules the official laws of beach soccer.

Beach Soccer Worldwide, with FIFA's assistance, continues to be the main organisation that arranges beach soccer tournaments and fosters the sport's development around the world, mainly in Europe, including the Euro Beach Soccer League, BSWW exhibition tour events and others, having involved over 110 national teams in the sport, and created new club competitions. Its founders also established the Beach Soccer World Championships; in 2005, BSWW created a partnership with FIFA to manage the tournament as the FIFA Beach Soccer World Cup, the only major international beach soccer tournament that BSWW does not have a hand in organising, being entirely a FIFA competition.

Members of the organisation serve on FIFA's Beach Soccer Committee. The first international matches were played in 1993 for men and 2009 for women. As of July 2023, 193 men's/64 women's clubs and 101 men's/23 women's national teams were sorted in the world rankings.

== History ==
=== Founding ===
BSWW's routes are traced back to 1992 with the establishment of the official rules of the sport by Giancarlo Signorini, the founding partner of Beach Soccer Company (BSC). In 1992, Signorini staged a pilot event in Los Angeles in order to test out and perfect these rules which remain very similar today. In July 1993, with the aid of his own company, BSI, Signorini organised the first professional beach soccer event, held on Miami Beach, Florida. A keen interest was taken by Brazilian sports marketing agency, Koch Tavares, who replicated the event in 1994 in Rio de Janeiro, Brazil and Viking Graham Sports Group, a Philadelphia based investment group, acquired BSI's rights to stage professional beach soccer events, forming a partnership with Signorini to create Beach Soccer Company.

Koch Tavares and BSC went on to be the main two entities involved in promoting beach soccer for the rest of the 1990s, with the former responsible for organising the Beach Soccer World Championships beginning in 1995, and the latter establishing the Pro Beach Soccer Tour in 1996, a series of worldwide professional exhibition tournaments to promote the sport, and the European Pro Beach Soccer League in 1998, all contested between national teams as opposed to clubs. BSC relocated to Monaco in 1998 and again to Barcelona in 1999, renaming to become Pro Beach Soccer, S.L. (PBS) in 2000 to reflect the branding of their established events.

In October 2000, the entity of Koch Tavares responsible for beach soccer and PBS came together to register one single company in order to streamline development of the sport under one unifying company, as opposed to multiple parties involved trying to synchronise progress between one another, officially forming Beach Soccer Worldwide, opting to remain based in Barcelona. Starting with the 2001 season, BSWW took on roles of organising all major competitions of the preceding companies including the Pro Beach Soccer Tour and European Pro Beach Soccer League, whilst supervising the World Championships and the newly created America's League, all remaining focused on national teams. This was also done to make it easier to bring on board sponsors, coordinate media coverage and present the football alternative to FIFA under a clearly defined, all-encompassing, representative body for beach soccer.

=== F ===
The involvement with FIFA was furthered in 2004 when FIFA Beach Soccer S.L. was established in agreement and partnership with championships has eased the full involvement of BSWW, allowing the federation to promote the club side of the game more, establishing the Mundialito de Clubs (Club World Cup) in 2011 and the Euro Winners Cup (similar to the UEFA Champions League) in 2013.

Development of the women's game has also become a target for BSWW, with the first official game between Switzerland and Germany in 2009, promoting further international exhibition tournaments and friendlies involving nations such as England, Italy and the Czech Republic, with the Euro Winners Cup having a 16-club women's version for the first time in 2016 and the first Women's Euro Beach Soccer Cup also taking place in 2016.

BSWW has organised and delivered over 200 international events in more than 50 countries worldwide, involving over 110 nations from all confederations, assembling an audience of over 250 million households in 180 countries. Vice-president Joan Cuscó continues to serve on FIFA's Beach Soccer committee as BSWW's representative. In 2017, BSWW and FIFA agreed to extend their partnership until at least 2024.

== Identity ==
=== Flag ===
2001–2008

2009–2016

2016–present

== Stars awards ==
2018 individual award winners
Best player	(Spain) Llorenç Gomez
Best goalkeeper	(Portugal) Elinton Andrade
Best coach	(Brazil) Gilberto Costa
Rising star	(Iran) Mohammad Moradi
Best goal	(Spain) Eduard Suarez
Best women's player	(Russia) Marina Fedorova

It has been standard practice for BSWW to award prizes to the top scorer, MVP and best goalkeeper at the conclusion every event of their organisation. However, in 2014, BSWW took this concept of awards to a new level, establishing beach soccer's first annual end of season awards ceremony, taking place during November in Dubai. The ceremony, a gala event attended by many of the world's leading figures in the sport, celebrates the achievements of top performers worldwide over the course of the season and has been compared to FIFA's The Best awards and the Ballon d'Or in association football, in both importance, grandeur and equivalence for those involved in beach soccer.

Some of the many prizes awarded on the night include best player of the year, best coach of the year, best goal and best team.

== BSWW structured tournaments ==
BSWW organises and has an input in many different competitions; the following are regular events that are ongoing:

Advisory role:

- FIFA Beach Soccer World Cup

Considerable input, with involvement from confederations, under the supervision of FIFA:

- AFC Beach Soccer Championship
- Africa Beach Soccer Cup of Nations
- CONCACAF Beach Soccer Championship
- CONMEBOL Beach Soccer Championship
- OFC Beach Soccer Championship
- FIFA Beach Soccer World Cup qualifiers (UEFA)
- Euro Beach Soccer League
- Euro Beach Soccer Cup (formerly)
- Intercontinental Cup
- Mundialito
- Multiple BSWW Tour exhibition tournaments per year
- Persian Beach Soccer Cup
- Mundialito de Clubes
- Euro Winners Cup
- Euro Winners Challenge
- World Winners Cup
- Americas Winners Cup
- Women's Euro Winners Cup
- Women's Americas Winners Cup

Affiliation only:

- World Beach Games
- European Games
- Asian Beach Games
- Mediterranean Beach Games
- South American Beach Games
- African Beach Games

=== Current title holders ===
Competition	Year	Champions	Title	Runners-up	Next edition
Global
FIFA Beach Soccer World Cup	2025 (Final)	Brazil	6th	Belarus	2027 (Final)
World Beach Games	2019 (Final)	Brazil	1st	Russia	2027 (Final)
Beach Soccer Intercontinental Cup	2022 (Final)	Iran	4th	Brazil	TBA
Mediterranean Beach Games	2023	Spain	1st	Portugal	2027
BSWW Mundialito	2023	Brazil	15th	United Arab Emirates	TBA
Africa
Africa Beach Soccer Cup of Nations	2024 (Final)	Senegal	8th	Mauritania	2026 (Final)
Asia
AFC Beach Soccer Asian Cup	2025 (Final)	Iran	4th	Oman	2026 (Final)
Asian Beach Games	2026	Iran	1st	Oman	2028
North America
CONCACAF Beach Soccer Championship	2025 (Final)	El Salvador	3rd	Guatemala	2027 (Final)
Oceania
OFC Beach Soccer Nations Cup	2024 (Final)	Tahiti	4th	Solomon Islands	2026 (Final)
South America
South American Beach Games	2023	Brazil	5th	Colombia	2023
FIFA Beach Soccer World Cup qualification (CONMEBOL)	2021 (Final)	Brazil	8th	Uruguay	

Competition	Year	Champions	Title	Runners-up	Next edition
Europe
European Games	2023 (Final)	Switzerland	1st	Italy	2027 (Final)
Euro Beach Soccer Cup	2016	Portugal	2nd	Italy	---
Euro Beach Soccer League	2025	Italy	4th	Spain	2026
FIFA Beach Soccer World Cup qualification (UEFA)	2024	Portugal	1st	Italy	2026
World Beach Games qualification (UEFA)	2023	Spain	1st	Portugal	2027
National teams (women)
Women's Euro Beach Soccer Cup	2019	Russia	2nd	Spain	2022
Women's Euro Beach Soccer League	2025	Portugal	1st	Spain	2026
Club teams
Mundialito de Clubes	2021	(Russia) Lokomotiv Moscow	3rd	(Portugal) Braga	2022
World Winners Cup	2025 (Final)	(Israel) Kfar Qassem	2nd	(Italy) Napoli	2026 (Final)
Euro Winners Cup	2025 (Final)	(Italy) Catania BS	1st	(Israel) Kfar Qassem	2026 (Final)
Euro Winners Challenge	2025 (Final)	(Portugal) GD Alfarim	1st	(Germany) Real Münster	2026 (Final)
Club teams (women)
Women's Euro Winners Cup	2025	(Spain) Higicontrol Melilla	3rd	(Spain) Atlético Torroxeño	2026

== Teams ==
National teams with year of first international game:

=== Men ===
1. Brazil national beach soccer team (1993)
2. Argentina national beach soccer team (1993)
3. United States men's national beach soccer team (1993)
4. Italy national beach soccer team (1993)
5. Chile national beach soccer team (1994)
6. Uruguay national beach soccer team (1994)
7. Netherlands national beach soccer team (1995)
8. Germany national beach soccer team (1995)
9. England national beach soccer team (1995)
10. Mexico national beach soccer team (1995)
11. Japan national beach soccer team (1995)
12. South Korea national beach soccer team (1995)
13. Canada national beach soccer team (1995)
14. Russia national beach soccer team (1996)
15. Denmark national beach soccer team (1996)
16. France national beach soccer team (1996)
17. Spain national beach soccer team (1996)
18. Belgium national beach soccer team (1996)
19. Malaysia national beach soccer team (1996)
20. (Socialist Federal Republic of Yugoslavia) Yugoslavia national beach soccer team (1996)
21. Portugal national beach soccer team (1996)
22. Peru national beach soccer team (1998)
23. Switzerland national beach soccer team (1998)
24. Austria national beach soccer team (1998)
25. Nigeria national beach soccer team (1998)
26. Paraguay national beach soccer team (1999)
27. South Africa national beach soccer team (1999)
28. Venezuela national beach soccer team (2000)
29. Turkey national beach soccer team (2000)
30. (Republic of Ireland) Ireland national beach soccer team (2001)
31. Thailand national beach soccer team (2002)
32. Norway national beach soccer team (2002)
33. Greece national beach soccer team (2003)
34. Sweden national beach soccer team (2004)
35. Poland national beach soccer team (2004)
36. Monaco national beach soccer team (2004)
37. Ukraine national beach soccer team (2005)
38. Hungary national beach soccer team (2005)
39. Australia national beach soccer team (2005)
40. Czech Republic national beach soccer team (2006)
41. Costa Rica national beach soccer team (2006)
42. Iran national beach soccer team (2006)
43. China national beach soccer team (2006)
44. Philippines national beach soccer team (2006)
45. United Arab Emirates national beach soccer team (2006)
46. Bahrain national beach soccer team (2006)
47. Montenegro national beach soccer team (2006)
48. Solomon Islands national beach soccer team (2006)
49. Cook Islands national beach soccer team (2006)
50. (French Polynesia) Tahiti national beach soccer team (2006)
51. Vanuatu national beach soccer team (2006)
52. Jamaica national beach soccer team (2006)
53. Egypt national beach soccer team (2006)
54. Morocco national beach soccer team (2006)
55. Cameroon national beach soccer team (2006)
56. Ivory Coast national beach soccer team (2006)
57. Réunion national beach soccer team (2006)
58. Madagascar national beach soccer team (2006)
59. Senegal national beach soccer team (2006)
60. Israel national beach soccer team (2007)
61. Bulgaria national beach soccer team (2007)
62. Romania national beach soccer team (2007)
63. Estonia national beach soccer team (2007)
64. Cape Verde national beach soccer team (2007)
65. Mozambique national beach soccer team (2007)
66. India national beach soccer team (2007)
67. El Salvador national beach soccer team (2007)
68. New Zealand national beach soccer team (2007)
69. Azerbaijan national beach soccer team (2008)
70. Uzbekistan national beach soccer team (2008)
71. Latvia national beach soccer team (2008)
72. Slovakia national beach soccer team (2008)
73. Andorra national beach soccer team (2008)
74. (Georgia (country)) Georgia national beach soccer team (2008)
75. Lithuania national beach soccer team (2008)
76. Kuwait national beach soccer team (2008)
77. Oman national beach soccer team (2008)
78. Libya national beach soccer team (2008)
79. Algeria national beach soccer team (2008)
80. Yemen national beach soccer team (2008)
81. Indonesia national beach soccer team (2008)
82. Timor-Leste national beach soccer team (2008)
83. Vietnam national beach soccer team (2008)
84. Laos national beach soccer team (2008)
85. Brunei national beach soccer team (2008)
86. Myanmar national beach soccer team (2008)
87. Qatar national beach soccer team (2008)
88. Mauritius national beach soccer team (2008)
89. Ecuador national beach soccer team (2009)
90. Fiji national beach soccer team (2009)
91. Moldova national beach soccer team (2009)
92. Finland national beach soccer team (2009)
93. Colombia national beach soccer team (2009)
94. Somalia national beach soccer team (2009) ?
95. Syria national beach soccer team (2010)
96. Saudi Arabia national beach soccer team (2010)
97. Kazakhstan national beach soccer team (2010)
98. Palestine national beach soccer team (2010)
99. Jordan national beach soccer team (2010)
100. Guatemala national beach soccer team (2010)
101. Lebanon national beach soccer team (2010)
102. Iraq national beach soccer team (2011)
103. Bangladesh national beach soccer team (2011)
104. Nepal national beach soccer team (2011)
105. Maldives national beach soccer team (2011)
106. Sri Lanka national beach soccer team (2011)
107. Afghanistan national beach soccer team (2012)
108. Dominican Republic national beach soccer team (2012)
109. Albania national beach soccer team (2012)
110. New Caledonia national beach soccer team (2013)
111. Puerto Rico national beach soccer team (2013)
112. Trinidad and Tobago national beach soccer team (2013)
113. Zanzibar national beach soccer team (2014) Unofficial
114. Uganda national beach soccer team (2014)
115. Bolivia national beach soccer team (2014)
116. Kenya national beach soccer team (2015)
117. Ghana national beach soccer team (2015)
118. Seychelles national beach soccer team (2015)
119. Belize national beach soccer team (2015)
120. Panama national beach soccer team (2015)
121. Antigua and Barbuda national beach soccer team (2015)
122. Barbados national beach soccer team (2015)
123. Guadeloupe national beach soccer team (2015)
124. Turks and Caicos Islands national beach soccer team (2015)
125. (United States Virgin Islands) U.S. Virgin Islands national beach soccer team (2015)
126. Malta national beach soccer team (2015)
127. Guyana national beach soccer team (2017)
128. Bonaire national beach soccer team (2019)
129. Kyrgyzstan national beach soccer team (2019)
130. Malawi national beach soccer team (2022)
131. Tanzania national beach soccer team (?)
132. Tunisia national beach soccer team (?)
133. Burundi national beach soccer team (?)
134. Comoros national beach soccer team (?)
135. Djibouti national beach soccer team (?)
136. Liberia national beach soccer team (?)
137. Mali national beach soccer team (?)
138. Sudan national beach soccer team (?)
139. (Democratic Republic of the Congo) DR Congo national beach soccer team (?)
140. Tonga national beach soccer team (?)
141. Croatia national beach soccer team (?)
142. Equatorial Guinea national beach soccer team (?)

=== Women ===
1. Switzerland women's national beach soccer team (2009)
2. Germany women's national beach soccer team (2009)
3. Portugal women's national beach soccer team (2010)
4. Haiti women's national beach soccer team (2010)
5. Dominican Republic women's national beach soccer team (2010)
6. Italy women's national beach soccer team (2011)
7. Czech Republic women's national beach soccer team (2011)
8. (The Bahamas) Bahamas women's national beach soccer team (2012)
9. (Turks and Caicos Islands) Turks & Caicos Islands women's national beach soccer team (2012)
10. England women's national beach soccer team (2014)
11. Greece women's national beach soccer team (2016)
12. Spain women's national beach soccer team (2016)
13. Netherlands women's national beach soccer team (2016)
14. Mexico women's national beach soccer team (2017)
15. Russia women's national beach soccer team (2018)
16. Algeria women's national beach soccer team (2019)
17. Cape Verde women's national beach soccer team (2019)
18. Belarus women's national beach soccer team (2019)
19. El Salvador women's national beach soccer team (2019)
20. United States women's national beach soccer team (2019)
21. Brazil women's national beach soccer team (2019)
22. Paraguay women's national beach soccer team (2019)
23. Argentina women's national beach soccer team (2019)
24. Chile women's national beach soccer team (2019)
25. Ukraine women's national beach soccer team (2021)
26. Sweden women's national beach soccer team (2022)
27. Trinidad and Tobago women's national beach soccer team (2022)
28. Poland women's national beach soccer team (2022)

== Rankings ==
Top 10 Rankings – January 2022
Rank	Change	Team	Points	Confederation
1	Steady	Russia	4032	UEFA
2	Steady	Portugal	3042	UEFA
3	Steady	Brazil	2523	CONMEBOL
4	Steady	Japan	2404	AFC
5	▲	Senegal	2257	CAF
6	▼	Spain	2249	UEFA
7	Steady	Switzerland	2234	UEFA
8	Steady	Italy	1975	UEFA
9	Steady	Uruguay	1380	CONMEBOL
10	Steady	Paraguay	1322	CONMEBOL

BSWW established a ranking system for European teams in the mid-2000s as the majority of tournaments are held in Europe and it is the most active continent for national teams. Hence the ranking was used for seeding in competitions like the EBSL. However, in 2014, BSWW created the first world ranking table based on a similar system to FIFA's world ranking for association football national teams.

== Sponsors ==
As of June 2022

Official Global Partners:

- Genius Sports
- Iqoniq
- Puma
- RealFevr

Official partners:

- Nostra
- United Nations Alliance of Civilizations (UNAOC)
- Universo Mujer

Technical Partners:

- Idoven

== Foundation ==
Beach Soccer Worldwide extends its commitment beyond purely sport development. In 2009, the Beach Soccer Foundation was created by BSWW to tackle three main issues surrounding the sport:

- Environmental protection through awareness and recycling
- The development of children and young people through sport
- Awareness and prevention of skin cancer

== History Results Database ==
- beach SOCCER RESULTS (1993-2019)
- Beach Soccer Worldwide (1993-2020)
- All-time results (2021-Ongoing)
- The Roon Ba (2010-2023)
- The Roon Ba (2010-2023)
- The Roon Ba (2010-2020)
- Fédération Internationale de Football Association (FIFA) - FIFA.com (Results in Team Profile)
