= Beach soccer at the 2023 European Games – Men's tournament =

Tournament details
- Host country: Poland
- Dates: 27 June – 1 July
- Teams: 8 (from 1 confederation)
- Venue: Tarnów Beach Arena

Final positions
- Champions: Switzerland (1st title)
- Runners-up: Italy
- Third place: Spain
- Fourth place: Portugal

Tournament statistics
- Matches played: 20
- Goals scored: 184 (9.2 per match)
- Top scorer(s): (Switzerland) Dejan Stankovic (11 goals)

The men's beach soccer tournament at the 2023 European Games was held from 27 June to 1 July at the Tarnów Beach Arena.

== Draw ==
The draw was held on 11 May 2023 in Barcelona, at the headquarters of Beach Soccer Worldwide.

Seedings

Pot 1	Pot 2	Pot 3	Pot 4
Poland (A1); Switzerland (B1)	Italy; Portugal	Spain; Ukraine	Azerbaijan; Moldova

== Group stage ==
All times are local (UTC+2).

=== Group A ===
Pos	Team	Pld	W	W+	WP	L	GF	GA	GD	Pts	Qualification
1	Portugal	3	3	0	0	0	18	9	+9	9	Semifinals
2	Spain	3	2	0	0	1	18	9	+9	6	Semifinals
3	Poland (H)	3	1	0	0	2	10	14	−4	3	5–8th place semifinals
4	Azerbaijan	3	0	0	0	3	5	19	−14	0	5–8th place semifinals

Source: EG2023
(H) Host
27 June 2023
16:00

Portugal	7–5	Spain
Bê Martins 2', 4', 23'; Léo Martins 13'; Domingo 17' (o.g.); Jordan 23', 33' (pen.)	BSWW; EG2023	Arias 15'; Chiky 17'; Kuman 18'; David 22'; Dona 31'

Tarnów Beach Arena
Referee: Eduards Borisevičs (Latvia)
27 June 2023
20:30

Azerbaijan	2–7	Poland
Elshad 4'; Huseynov 28'	BSWW; EG2023	Gac 6'; Jesionowski 8'; Witkowski 12', 23'; Bistuła 18'; Baran 33'; Ziober 36'

Tarnów Beach Arena
Referee: Laurynas Aržuolaitis (Lithuania)

28 June 2023
16:00

Portugal	5–2	Azerbaijan
Brilhante 18'; Bê Martins 24'; Léo Martins 25', 36'; Pintado 31'	BSWW; EG2023	Mammadov 7', 31'

Tarnów Beach Arena
Referee: Dario Minder (Switzerland)
28 June 2023
20:30

Poland	1–6	Spain
Baran 19'	BSWW; EG2023	Oliver 2', 29'; Antonio 3'; Kuman 19'; David 24'; Arias 25'

Tarnów Beach Arena
Referee: Malte Gerhardt (Germany)

29 June 2023
16:00

Spain	7–1	Azerbaijan
Mejías 3'; Chiky 13', 24', 35'; Arias 21'; Kuman 22'; Rigaud 26'	BSWW	Elshad 10'

Tarnów Beach Arena
Referee: Saverio Bottalico (Italy)
29 June 2023
20:30

Poland	2–6	Portugal
Baran 1'; Jesionowski 11'	BSWW; EG2023	Bê Martins 4'; Léo Martins 10', 14' (pen.); Pinhal 12'; Pintado 16', 36'

Tarnów Beach Arena
Referee: Matthieu Dor (France)

=== Group B ===
Pos	Team	Pld	W	W+	WP	L	GF	GA	GD	Pts	Qualification
1	Italy	3	2	0	0	1	16	13	+3	6 (Note: Italy 3 Pts, +1 GD; Switzerland 3 Pts, 0 GD; Ukraine 3 Pts, –1 GD)	Semifinals
2	Switzerland	3	2	0	0	1	16	11	+5	6	Semifinals
3	Ukraine	3	2	0	0	1	14	14	0	6	5–8th place semifinals
4	Moldova	3	0	0	0	3	13	21	−8	0	5–8th place semifinals

Source: EG2023
Notes:
27 June 2023
13:00

Italy	5–6	Ukraine
Sciacca 6'; Sassari 15'; Zurlo 26'; Bertacca 27'; Giordani 36'	BSWW; EG2023	Shcherytsia 3'; Zavorotnyi 5'; Zborovskyi 12'; Borsuk 28' (pen.); Pashko 29'; Voitok 35'

Tarnów Beach Arena
Referee: Łukasz Ostrowski (Poland)
27 June 2023
17:00

Moldova	4–9	Switzerland
Graur 4'; Podlesnov 18'; Borovschi 21'; Istrati 27'	BSWW; EG2023	Stankovic 3', 3' (pen.), 9', 10', 18', 21', 35'; Rüttimann 12'; Ott 32'

Tarnów Beach Arena
Referee: Álvaro Cánovas (Spain)

28 June 2023
13:00

Italy	6–4	Moldova
Fazzini 5'; Remedi 5'; Zurlo 9', 22', 36'; Sciacca 26' (pen.)	BSWW; EG2023	Cojocari 13', 23'; Garanovschi 26'; Turta 36'

Tarnów Beach Arena
Referee: Francisco da Costa (Portugal)
28 June 2023
17:30

Switzerland	4–2	Ukraine
Stankovic 18', 27'; Kessler 19'; Rüttimann 21'	BSWW; EG2023	Glutskyi 4'; Borsuk 27'

Tarnów Beach Arena
Referee: Eduards Borisevičs (Latvia)

29 June 2023
13:00

Ukraine	6–5	Moldova
Zborovskyi 4'; Voitok 8', 11'; Voitenko 14'; Glutskyi 21'; Medvid 21'	BSWW; EG2023	Graur 7', 15'; Turta 30'; Podlesnov 34', 35'

Tarnów Beach Arena
Referee: Łukasz Ostrowski (Poland)
29 June 2023
17:30

Switzerland	3–5	Italy
Ott 16'; Spacca 25'; Stankovic 26'	BSWW; EG2023	Fazzini 12'; Genovali 13'; Giordani 15', 22', 29'

Tarnów Beach Arena
Referee: Malte Gerhardt (Germany)

== Placement matches ==
=== Bracket ===
5–8th place semifinals
30 June
Azerbaijan (a.e.t.)	7
Ukraine	6
30 June
Poland	6
Moldova	8

Fifth place match
1 July
Azerbaijan	4
Moldova	2
Seventh place match
1 July
Poland	2
Ukraine	3

=== 5–8th place semifinals ===
30 June 2023
13:00

Poland	6–8	Moldova
Baran 4' (pen.); Jesionowski 5'; Kiklaisz 12'; Pietrasiak 13'; Gac 16'	BSWW; EG2023	Borovschi 3'; Cojocari 7'; Ceh 12'; Turta 15'; Podlesnov 20', 33'; Graur 26', 35'

Tarnów Beach Arena
Referee: Álvaro Cánovas (Spain)

30 June 2023
14:30

Azerbaijan	7–6 (a.e.t.)	Ukraine
Amid 1', 34', 37'; Elshad 26', 36'; Zeynalli 29'; Mammadov 33'	BSWW; EG2023	Poslavskyi 10', 29'; Zborovskyi 10'; Pashko 13'; Voitenko 13', 33'

Tarnów Beach Arena
Referee: Annett Unterbeck (Germany)

=== Seventh place match ===
1 July 2023
12:30

Poland	2–3	Ukraine
Kiklaisz 26'; Ziober 30'	BSWW; EG2023	Glutskyi 30'; Voitok 35', 36'

Tarnów Beach Arena
Referee: Eduards Borisevičs (Latvia)

=== Fifth place match ===
1 July 2023
14:00

Azerbaijan	4–2	Moldova
Amid 8'; Sabir 16'; Ramil 20'; Huseynov 23' (pen.)	BSWW; EG2023	Graur 15'; Cojocari 26'

Tarnów Beach Arena
Referee: Angelika Gębka (Poland)

== Knockout stage ==
=== Bracket ===
Semifinals
30 June
Portugal	4 (3)
Switzerland (p)	4 (4)
30 June
Spain	5
Italy (a.e.t.)	6

Gold medal match
1 July
Switzerland	5
Italy	2
Bronze medal match
1 July
Portugal	5 (0)
Spain (p)	5 (2)

=== Semifinals ===
30 June 2023
17:30

Portugal	4–4 (a.e.t.)	Switzerland
Jordan 4'; Pintado 18'; Pinhal 19'; Léo Martins 25'	BSWW; EG2023	Spacca 12'; Rodrigues 24'; Steinemann 26'; Eliott 30'
Penalties
Bê Martins (penalty scored); Lourenço (penalty scored); Coimbra (penalty missed); Léo Martins (penalty missed); Jordan (penalty scored)	3–4	(penalty scored) Ott; (penalty missed) Spacca; (penalty scored) Steinemann; (penalty scored) Rodrigues; (penalty scored) Stankovic

Tarnów Beach Arena
Referee: Laurynas Aržuolaitis (Lithuania)

30 June 2023
20:30

Spain	5–6 (a.e.t.)	Italy
Chicky 2', 13'; Oliver 8', 12'; Domingo 18'	BSWW; EG2023	Giordani 1'; Sciacca 5', 18'; Remedi 30'; Domingo 31' (o.g.); Casapieri 38'

Tarnów Beach Arena
Referee: Eduards Borisevičs (Latvia)

=== Bronze medal match ===
1 July 2023
17:00

Portugal	5–5 (a.e.t.)	Spain
Léo Martins 11', 24' (pen.), 33'; Pintado 18'; Jordan 22'	BSWW; EG2023	Rigaud 4' (pen.); David 14', 23'; Arias 22' (pen.); Chicky 34'
Penalties
Jordan (penalty missed); Lourenço (penalty missed); Coimbra (penalty missed); Algarvio (penalty missed)	0–2	(penalty missed) Mejías; (penalty scored) Pedro; (penalty scored) Arias

Tarnów Beach Arena
Referee: Saverio Bottalico (Italy)

=== Gold medal match ===
1 July 2023
20:00

Switzerland	5–2	Italy
Eliott 9', 27'; Stankovic 12'; Steinemann 26', 30'	BSWW; EG2023	Zurlo 2' (pen.); Bertacca 36'

Tarnów Beach Arena
Referee: Łukasz Ostrowski (Poland)

== Final standings ==
Pos	Grp	Team	Pld	W	W+	WP	L	GF	GA	GD	Pts
1st place, gold medalist(s)	B	Switzerland	5	3	0	1	1	25	17	+8	10
2nd place, silver medalist(s)	B	Italy	5	2	1	0	2	24	23	+1	8
3rd place, bronze medalist(s)	A	Spain	5	2	0	1	2	28	20	+8	7
4	A	Portugal	5	3	0	0	2	27	18	+9	9
5	A	Azerbaijan	5	1	1	0	3	16	27	−11	5
6	B	Moldova	5	1	0	0	4	23	31	−8	3
7	B	Ukraine	5	3	0	0	2	23	23	0	9
8	A	Poland (H)	5	1	0	0	4	18	25	−7	3

Source: EG2023
(H) Host

== See also ==
- Beach soccer at the 2023 European Games – Women's tournament
