= Mélissa Gomes =

Portuguese footballer (born 1994)

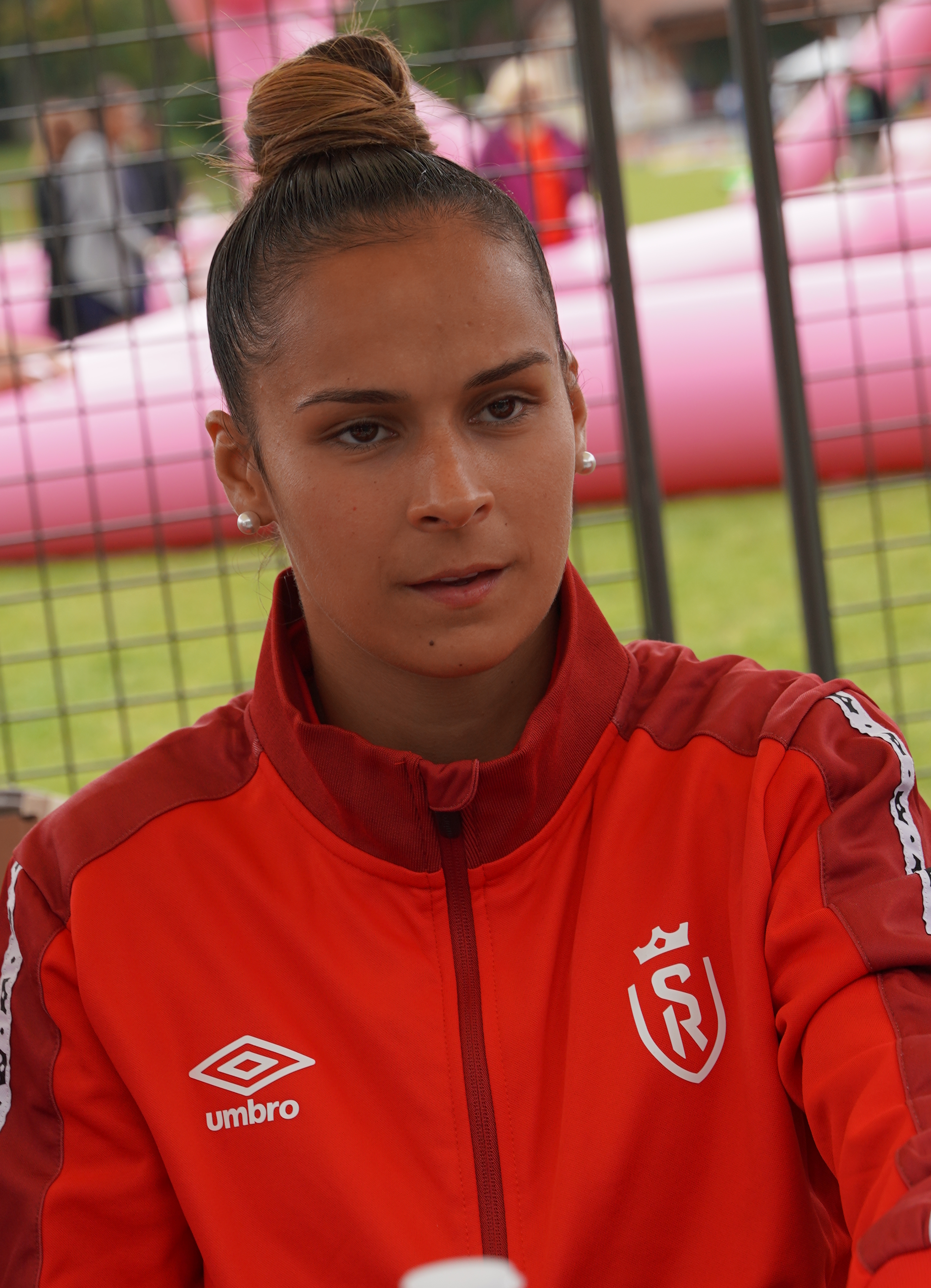
- Gomes with Reims in 2023

Personal information
- Full name: Mélissa Ferreira Gomes
- Date of birth: 27 April 1994 (age 32)
- Place of birth: Nogent-sur-Marne, France
- Height: 1.67 m (5 ft 6 in)
- Position: Forward

Team information
- Current team: Rio Ave
- Number: 9

Youth career
- VGA Saint-Maur
- Juvisy

Senior career*
Years	Team	Apps	(Gls)
2013–2014	Juvisy	5	(2)
2014–2017	VGA Saint-Maur	57	(28)
2017–2021	Reims	78	(42)
2021–2023	Bordeaux	43	(11)
2023–2025	Reims	40	(5)
2025–	Rio Ave	14	(0)

International career^{‡}
2011–2013	Portugal U19	22	(3)
2013–2024	Portugal	21	(0)
2016–	Portugal (beach soccer)	11	(14)
Medal record
Women's beach soccer
Representing Portugal
Women's Euro Beach Soccer League
Winner	2025
European Games
Bronze medal – third place	2023 Kraków-Małopolska
- * Club domestic league appearances and goals as of 22 March 2026 ‡ National team caps and goals as of 27 July 2025

Mélissa Ferreira Gomes (born 27 April 1994) is a Portuguese professional footballer who plays as a forward for Campeonato Nacional Feminino club Rio Ave.

== Club career ==
A youth academy graduate of Juvisy, Gomes made her club career debut on 6 November 2013 in a 3–1 win against Rodez. She replaced Sandrine Brétigny at 79th minute of the game and went on to score a goal ten minutes later.

On 2 July 2021, Gomes joined Bordeaux on a two-year deal.

== International career ==
Born in France, Gomes represents Portugal at the international level. She was part of Portuguese squad which reached semi-finals of the 2012 UEFA Women's Under-19 Championship. She made her senior team debut on 26 September 2013 in a 5–1 win against Greece.

Gomes has represented Portugal at the 2016 Women's Euro Beach Soccer Cup and helped her team to finish third.

== Career statistics ==
=== International ===
As of match played 27 February 2024

Appearances and goals by national team and year
National team	Year	Apps	Goals
Portugal	2013	3	0
Portugal	2014	5	0
Portugal	2019	4	0
Portugal	2020	4	0
Portugal	2021	3	0
Portugal	2022	1	0
Portugal	2024	1	0
Total		21	0

== Honours ==
Individual

- Coupe de France Féminine top goalscorer: 2022–23
