= Portugal women's national beach soccer team =

National sports team

Portugal
- Association: Portuguese Football Federation (FPF)
- Confederation: UEFA (Europe)
- Head coach: Alan Cavalcanti
- Captain: Jamila Marreiros
- Most caps: Inês Cruz (40)
- Top scorer: Carolina Ferreira (16)
- FIFA code: POR
- BSWW ranking: 2 (1 October 2025)
First colours
Second colours

First international
- Switzerland 5–3 Portugal (Lausanne, Switzerland; 25 July 2010)

Biggest win
- Portugal 6–1 United States (Ayamonte, Spain; 13 October 2023); Portugal 8–3 Switzerland (Castellammare di Stabia, Italy; 25 July 2025)

Biggest defeat
- Portugal 1–5 Switzerland (Espinho, Portugal; 4 July 2015) Poland 5–1 Portugal (Alghero, Italy; 15 September 2024) Portugal 1–5 Spain (Nazaré, Portugal; 3 July 2022)
- Website: fpf.pt

The Portugal women's national beach soccer team represents Portugal in international women's beach soccer competitions and is controlled by the FPF, the governing body for football in Portugal.

A team representing Portugal first materialised for a friendly match versus Switzerland in 2010. However, the first widely recognised participation of the team was in a three-team exhibition tournament in 2014, and its first competitive matches occurred in 2016 at the Euro Beach Soccer Cup. Development accelerated following the appointment of Alan Cavalcanti as head coach in 2021; the team became European champions for the first time as winners of the 2025 Euro Beach Soccer League.

== Competitive records ==
=== Euro Beach Soccer Cup/League ===
Year	Result	Pld	W	W+	WP	L	GF	GA	GD
Euro Beach Soccer Cup
2016	3rd place	3	1	0	1	1	13	13	0
2017	Did not enter								
2018	Did not enter								
2019	Did not enter								
Euro Beach Soccer League
2021	5th place	4	2	0	0	2	10	9	+1
2022	3rd place	7	4	0	0	3	21	20	+1
2023	Runners-up	4	2	1	0	1	11	7	+4
2024	Runners-up	8	5	0	0	3	23	19	+4
2025	Champions	7	6	0	1	0	30	15	+15
Total	1 title	33	20	1	2	10	108	83	+25

=== European Games ===
Year	Result	Pld	W	W+	WP	L	GF	GA	GD
2023	Bronze medal	4	2	0	1	1	10	7	+3
Total	1 medal	4	2	0	1	1	10	7	+3

== Honours ==
- Euro Beach Soccer League
  - Champions (1): 2025
  - Regular season stages (1): 2025
- European Games
  - Bronze medal (1): 2023

== Players ==
=== Current squad ===
Head coach: Alan Cavalcanti

The following were called up in preparation for the 2025 Women's Euro Beach Soccer League Superfinal.

Caps and goals as of 14 September 2025.

No.	Pos.	Player	Date of birth (age)	Caps	Goals	Club
	GK	Jamila Marreiros	30 May 1988 (age 38)	39	7	(Portuguese Football Federation) Pastéis da Bola
	GK	Lara Silva	25 September 2004 (age 21)	4	0	(Portuguese Football Federation) O Sótão
	DF	Joana Flores	8 October 1989 (age 36)	39	15	(Portuguese Football Federation) O Sótão
	DF	Emma Toscano	22 February 1991 (age 35)	38	7	(Portuguese Football Federation) O Sótão
	DF	Daniela Pereira	28 September 1994 (age 31)	20	5	(Portuguese Football Federation) Nazaré 2022
	MF	Erica Ferreira	4 December 1998 (age 27)	36	14	(Portuguese Football Federation) Pastéis da Bola
	MF	Carolina Ferreira	2 June 1997 (age 29)	27	16	(Portuguese Football Federation) O Sótão
	MF	Marta Simões	11 June 1999 (age 27)	27	7	(Portuguese Football Federation) Monte Real Academy
	MF	Beatriz Tristão	10 April 1999 (age 27)	13	2	(Portuguese Football Federation) Pastéis da Bola
	MF	Mélissa Gomes	27 April 1994 (age 32)	11	11	(French Football Federation) Stade de Reims
	MF	Joana Vasco	2 December 2008 (age 17)	6	1	(Portuguese Football Federation) O Sótão
	FW	Inês Cruz	8 November 1991 (age 34)	40	12	(Portuguese Football Federation) O Sótão
	FW	Andreia Silva	16 March 1985 (age 41)	37	5	(Portuguese Football Federation) Pastéis da Bola
	FW	Cristiana Costa	6 September 1994 (age 31)	35	10	(Portuguese Football Federation) Pastéis da Bola
	FW	Joana Meira	17 June 1993 (age 33)	19	5	(Portuguese Football Federation) Pastéis da Bola

== Results ==
The following is a list of match results in the last 12 months, as well as historic matches since the team's inception.

Win Draw Loss

=== Historic ===
2010–2024

2010

25 July 2010 Friendly	Switzerland	5–3	Portugal	Lausanne, Switzerland

2014

24 July 2014 3-team exhibition tournament	Portugal	5–2	England	Espinho, Portugal

25 July 2014 3-team exhibition tournament	Portugal	4–4 (a.e.t.) (3–2 p)	Switzerland	Espinho, Portugal

2015

4 July 2015 Friendly	Portugal	1–5	Switzerland	Espinho, Portugal

2016

29 July 2016 Euro Beach Soccer Cup	Portugal	4–3	Netherlands	Carcavelos, Portugal

30 July 2016 Euro Beach Soccer Cup	Portugal	3–4 (a.e.t.)	Spain	Carcavelos, Portugal

31 July 2016 Euro Beach Soccer Cup	Portugal	6–6 (a.e.t.) (2–0 p)	England	Carcavelos, Portugal

2021

9 September 2021 Euro Beach Soccer League	England	3–2	Portugal	Figueira da Foz, Portugal

10 September 2021 Euro Beach Soccer League	Switzerland	3–1	Portugal	Figueira da Foz, Portugal

11 September 2021 Euro Beach Soccer League	Portugal	5–2	Czech Republic	Figueira da Foz, Portugal

12 September 2021 Euro Beach Soccer League	Portugal	2–1	Ukraine	Figueira da Foz, Portugal

2022

1 July 2022 Euro Beach Soccer League	Portugal	5–2	Czech Republic	Nazaré, Portugal

2 July 2022 Euro Beach Soccer League	Portugal	4–3	Italy	Nazaré, Portugal

3 July 2022 Euro Beach Soccer League	Spain	5–1	Portugal	Nazaré, Portugal

8 September 2022 Euro Beach Soccer League	Portugal	5–3	England	Cagliari, Italy

9 September 2022 Euro Beach Soccer League	Ukraine	3–2	Portugal	Cagliari, Italy

10 September 2022 Euro Beach Soccer League	Spain	4–1	Portugal	Cagliari, Italy

11 September 2022 Euro Beach Soccer League	Portugal	3–0	Ukraine	Cagliari, Italy

2023

6 June 2023 Friendly	Portugal	4–3	Ukraine	Nazaré, Portugal

7 June 2023 Friendly	Portugal	3–3 (a.e.t.) (3–2 p)	Ukraine	Nazaré, Portugal

28 June 2023 European Games	Czech Republic	1–5	Portugal	Tarnów, Poland

29 June 2023 European Games	Poland	1–2	Portugal	Tarnów, Poland

30 June 2023 European Games	Ukraine	3–1	Portugal	Tarnów, Poland

1 July 2023 European Games	Poland	2–2 (a.e.t.) (0–3 p)	Portugal	Tarnów, Poland

20 September 2023 Euro Beach Soccer League	Netherlands	1–4	Portugal	Alghero, Italy

22 September 2023 Euro Beach Soccer League	Ukraine	2–3 (a.e.t.)	Portugal	Alghero, Italy

23 September 2023 Euro Beach Soccer League	Portugal	2–1	Czech Republic	Alghero, Italy

24 September 2023 Euro Beach Soccer League	Spain	3–2	Portugal	Alghero, Italy

13 October 2023 Mundialito	Portugal	6–1	United States	Ayamonte, Spain

14 October 2023 Mundialito	England	3–3 (a.e.t.) (2–4 p)	Portugal	Ayamonte, Spain

15 October 2023 Mundialito	Spain	2–1	Portugal	Ayamonte, Spain

2024

30 August 2024 Euro Beach Soccer League	Portugal	5–1	England	Nazaré, Portugal

31 August 2024 Euro Beach Soccer League	Portugal	1–1 (a.e.t.) (2–4 p)	Ukraine	Nazaré, Portugal

1 September 2024 Euro Beach Soccer League	Portugal	3–1	Poland	Nazaré, Portugal

10 September 2024 Euro Beach Soccer League	Portugal	4–3	Ukraine	Alghero, Italy

11 September 2024 Euro Beach Soccer League	Portugal	5–3	Czech Republic	Alghero, Italy

13 September 2024 Euro Beach Soccer League	Italy	2–0	Portugal	Alghero, Italy

14 September 2024 Euro Beach Soccer League	Spain	3–4	Portugal	Alghero, Italy

15 September 2024 Euro Beach Soccer League	Poland	5–1	Portugal	Alghero, Italy

=== Recent ===
2025

25 July 2025 Euro Beach Soccer League	Portugal	8–3	Switzerland	Castellammare di Stabia, Italy

26 July 2025 Euro Beach Soccer League	Netherlands	2–6	Portugal	Castellammare di Stabia, Italy

27 July 2025 Euro Beach Soccer League	Italy	3–4	Portugal	Castellammare di Stabia, Italy

28 August 2025 Friendly	Poland	1–4	Portugal	Gdańsk, Poland

29 August 2025 Friendly	Poland	5–2	Portugal	Gdańsk, Poland

9 September 2025 Euro Beach Soccer League	Portugal	3–3 (a.e.t.) (4–3 p)	Switzerland	Viareggio, Italy

12 September 2025 Euro Beach Soccer League	Portugal	2–1	Poland	Viareggio, Italy

13 September 2025 Euro Beach Soccer League	Portugal	3–1	Ukraine	Viareggio, Italy

14 September 2025 Euro Beach Soccer League	Spain	2–4	Portugal	Viareggio, Italy

== See also ==
- Portugal national beach soccer team
- Portugal women's national football team
- Portugal women's national futsal team
