= Ukraine women's national beach soccer team =

National sports team

Ukraine
- Association: Ukrainian Association of Football
- Confederation: UEFA (Europe)
- Head coach: Yuriy Klymenko
- FIFA code: UKR

First international
- Spain 4–2 Ukraine (Nazaré, Portugal; 17 June 2021)

Biggest win
- Ukraine 4–0 Czech Republic (Názare, Portugal; 3 July 2022)

Biggest defeat
- Ukraine 1–7 Italy (Cagliari, Italy; 8 September 2022)
Medal record
European Games
Silver medal – second place	2023 Kraków

The Ukraine women's national beach soccer team represents Ukraine in international women's beach soccer competitions and is controlled by the UAF, the governing body for football in Ukraine.

First major achievement for the team was silver medal at the 2023 European Games when the team lost in a tight match to Spain.

== Competitive records ==
=== Women's Euro Beach Soccer League ===
Year	Result	Matches	Wins	Draws	Losses	GF	GA
(Portugal) 2021	Sixth place	8	3	0	5	17	28
(Portugal) 2022	Fourth place	7	2	0	5	13	22
(Italy) 2023	Sixth place	4	1	0	3	8	13

== Players ==
=== 2023 European Games ===
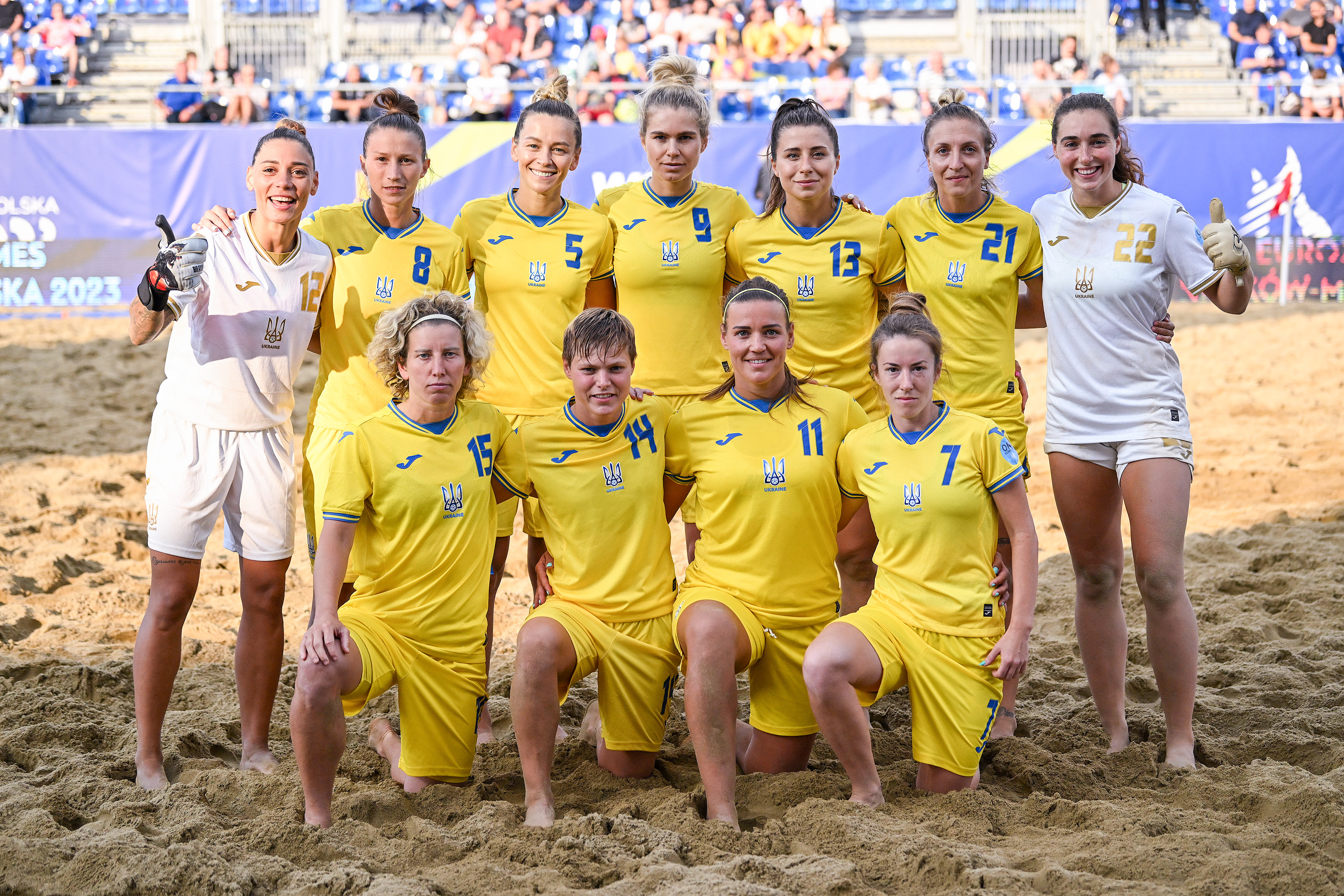
Ukraine women's national beach soccer team before the final game against Spain

- Ania Davydenko
- Iuliia Dekhtiar
- Iryna Dubytska
- Anastasiia Klipachenko
- Iuliia Kostiuk
- Viktoriia Kyslova
- Anna Shulha
- Anastasiia Terekh
- Mariia Tykhonova
- Iryna Vasyliuk
- Snizhana Volovenko
- Myroslava Vypasniak
- Taisiia Babenko (reserve)
- Aliona Kyrylchuk (reserve)

== See also ==
- Ukraine national beach soccer team
- Ukraine women's national football team
- Ukraine women's national futsal team
