= Beach soccer at the 2023 World Beach Games – Qualification (CONCACAF) =

Beach soccer tournament qualifiers

Beach soccer at the 2023 World Beach Games qualification (CONCACAF)
- ANOC World Beach Games Bali 2023 – Qualifier El Salvador

Tournament details
- Host country: El Salvador
- Dates: 6–8 April 2023
- Venue(s): 1 (in 1 host city)
- № of events: 2 (1 men's; 1 women's)
- Teams: 11 (from 7 countries)

Men's event
- Teams: 7
Final positions
Champions	United States
Runners-up	El Salvador
Third place	Costa Rica
- Matches played: 9
- Goals scored: 62 (6.89 per match)

Women's event
- Teams: 4
Final positions
Champions	El Salvador
Runners-up	United States
Third place	Trinidad and Tobago
- Matches played: 6
- Goals scored: 42 (7 per match)

Previous / Next edition
- ← 2019 2025 →

The CONCACAF qualifiers for the 2023 World Beach Games, known officially as the ANOC World Beach Games Bali 2023 – Qualifier El Salvador, was a beach soccer tournament contested by North American national teams who are members of CONCACAF that took place to determine the nations from North, Central America and the Caribbean that qualified to the beach soccer competition at the second edition of the ANOC World Beach Games.

The tournament consisted of two events: the men's qualifiers and the women's qualifiers, the former a knockout competition from which the top two teams qualified, and the latter a round robin contest from which the top two teams also qualified.

Organised by Beach Soccer Worldwide (BSWW) and National Sports Institute of El Salvador (INDES) in association with the Salvadoran Football Federation (FESFUT), the competition took place in San Luis La Herradura, El Salvador from 6–8 April 2023.

Mexico were the defending champions in both the men's and women's events but did not enter this year. The men's event was won by the United States, whilst the women's event was won by hosts El Salvador.

== Venues ==
For both the men's and women's tournaments, all matches were hosted at the Estadio Nacional de la Costa del Sol on the outskirts of San Luis La Herradura.

== Men's tournament ==
=== Teams ===
The men's event was a seven-team tournament. The entrants are listed below, ordered by their world ranking in parentheses (31 March 2023, out of 101 teams):

1. El Salvador (15) (hosts)
2. United States (17)
3. Bahamas (30)
4. Guatemala (35)
5. Costa Rica (41)
6. Trinidad and Tobago (53)
7. Belize (66)

=== Draw ===
The draw took place internally with most details undisclosed. As the top seeds, and with an odd number of participants, El Salvador received a bye in round one. The remaining six teams were organised based on their position in the world ranking (the second-best ranked team was drawn against the team ranked seventh, third against sixth, and fourth against fifth.)

=== Results ===
The competition was played as a straight knockout tournament, starting with the quarter-finals and ending with the final with the winner crowned champions of the event. Meanwhile, the losing nations of each round receded to play in a series of consolation matches in order to determine all final placements.

The two teams that reached the final qualified for the 2023 World Beach Games.

Matches are listed as local time in San Luis La Herradura, (UTC–6).

Fifth place
8 April; 14:30; Report
Guatemala	2
Bahamas	1

5th–8th place semifinals
—
Guatemala	bye
7 April; 14:45; Report
Bahamas	7
Belize	3

Quarterfinals
El Salvador	bye
—
6 April; 14:45; Report
Guatemala	4
Costa Rica	5
6 April; 17:15; Report
Bahamas	2
Trinidad and Tobago	3
6 April; 18:45; Report
United States	8
Belize	2

Semifinals
7 April; 20:00; Report
El Salvador (p)	5 (4)
Costa Rica	5 (2)
7 April; 17:15; Report
Trinidad and Tobago	0
United States	5

Final
8 April; 20:00; Report
El Salvador	2
United States	4
Third place
8 April; 17:00; Report
Costa Rica	4
Trinidad and Tobago	0

=== Awards ===
==== Winners trophy ====
2023 World Beach Games – CONCACAF Qualifier
Champions

United States
First title

==== Individual awards ====
Top scorer(s)
(Costa Rica) Greivin Pacheco
(El Salvador) Heber Ramos
(United States) Alessandro Canale
4 goals
Best player
(United States) Gabriel Silveira
Best goalkeeper
(United States) Christopher Toth

Source: BSWW

=== Final standings ===
Rank	Team	Qualification
1st place, gold medalist(s)	United States	2023 World Beach Games
2nd place, silver medalist(s)	El Salvador	2023 World Beach Games
3rd place, bronze medalist(s)	Costa Rica	
4	Trinidad and Tobago	
5	Guatemala	
6	Bahamas	
7	Belize	

Source: BSWW

== Women's tournament ==
=== Teams ===
Four teams entered the women's event which are as follows, ordered by their world ranking in parentheses (31 March 2023, out of 22 teams):

1. United States (7)
2. Bahamas (13)
3. El Salvador (15) (hosts)
4. Trinidad and Tobago (17)

=== Results ===
The competition was played as a single round robin tournament; the teams competed to earn points for the overall standings table – the two that accumulated the most points after all the matches were completed qualified for the 2023 World Beach Games.

Matches are listed as local time in San Luis La Herradura, (UTC–6).

Pos	Team	Pld	W	W+	WP	L	GF	GA	GD	Pts	Qualification
1st place, gold medalist(s)	El Salvador (H)	3	3	0	0	0	15	7	+8	9	2023 World Beach Games
2nd place, silver medalist(s)	United States	3	2	0	0	1	17	7	+10	6	2023 World Beach Games
3rd place, bronze medalist(s)	Trinidad and Tobago	3	1	0	0	2	8	13	−5	3	
4	Bahamas	3	0	0	0	3	2	15	−13	0	

Source: BSWW
(H) Host

6 April 2023	Bahamas	0–6	United States
16:00		Report

6 April 2023	Trinidad and Tobago	2–5	El Salvador
20:00		Report

7 April 2023	United States	7–2	Trinidad and Tobago
16:00		Report

7 April 2023	El Salvador	5–1	Bahamas
18:45		Report

8 April 2023	Bahamas	1–4	Trinidad and Tobago
15:45		Report

8 April 2023	El Salvador	5–4	United States
18:30		Report

=== Awards ===
==== Winners trophy ====
2023 World Beach Games – CONCACAF Qualifier
Champions

El Salvador
First title

==== Individual awards ====
Top scorer(s)
(El Salvador) Irma Guerra
5 goals
Best player
(El Salvador) Fatima Perez
Best goalkeeper
(United States) Melissa Lowder

Source: BSWW

== See also ==
- 2023 FIFA Beach Soccer World Cup qualification (CONCACAF)
