= Betto Lima =

Former Brazilian-American beach soccer forward

Personal information
- Full name: Alberto "Betto" Lima
- Place of birth: Rio de Janeiro, Brazil
- Height: 5 ft 7 in (1.70 m)
- Position: Forward

Senior career*
Years	Team	Apps	(Gls)
1994	Barry University (college)		
2005	Team Rio		
2010	Florida Beach Soccer FC		
2014	Miami United (beach soccer)		

International career
1990s	United States (beach soccer)		
2004–	United States (footvolley)		

Managerial career
- 2016: United States (footvolley, assistant coach)
- 2019: Antigua and Barbuda (beach)
- 2014–: CONCACAF (instructor)
- * Club domestic league appearances and goals

Betto Lima
Medal record

Representing United States

Men's beach soccer

Mundialito de Futebol de Praia
Gold medal – first place	1998	Figueira da Foz

Men's footvolley

International tournament
Gold medal – first place	2002	Canada

Kellogg's Footvolley International
Silver medal – second place	2004	Vienna

United States Footvolley National Championship
Silver medal – second place	2005	Miami
Gold medal – first place	2016	Miami

Alberto "Betto" Lima (known as Betto Lima or Beto Lima), is a Brazilian-born former soccer player who represented the United States Beach Soccer and United States Footvolley national teams. He later served as Beach Soccer Development Manager for CONCACAF.

== Career ==
=== College ===
Lima played college soccer at Barry University in Florida in 1994.

=== International beach soccer ===
He was part of the U.S. team that won the 1998 Mundialito de Futebol de Praia in Portugal, scoring two goals in the 8–2 final victory. He scored 6 goals across 6 appearances in the tournament.

=== USA footvolley ===
In 2002, Betto Lima won gold at an international tournament in Canada. In 2004, he partnered with Sergio Menezes for Team USA at the Kellogg's Footvolley International tournament in Vienna, Austria, where they reached the final and finished second after losing to a French Brazilian-based team.

He was runner-up in the inaugural United States Footvolley Association national championship on December 11, 2005, partnering with Adriano Boente.

In later years, he won the U.S. national championships in December 2016, partnering with Antonio DiMasio (Miami Beach) to defeat Sergio Menezes and Oscar Calvacante.

He also competed internationally, including in events like the 2022 EFVL World Challenge.

=== Club ===
Team Rio

Lima played for Team Rio in 2005 and won the U.S. Open at the 2005 North American Sand Soccer Championships.

Florida Beach Soccer FC

Lima played in the 2010 NASSC U.S. Open with Florida Beach Soccer FC where they came in third in the tournament pro division.

Miami United

Lima played for Miami United (beach soccer) at the 2014 BagoSports Beach Soccer Championships in Trinidad and Tobago, where he scored four goals in the group stage. The team reached the quarterfinals of the NASSC U.S. Open that same year, where he also attended as a guest celebrity.

== Coaching ==
As CONCACAF Beach Soccer Development Manager, he coordinated coaching courses and workshops across the region, including the organization's inaugural beach soccer training course in Fort Lauderdale (2014) and sessions in Turks and Caicos, Antigua and Barbuda, and Trinidad and Tobago.

In addition to his CONCACAF development role, Lima coached the Antigua and Barbuda national beach soccer team at the 2019 CONCACAF Beach Soccer Championship in Puerto Vallarta, Mexico (a qualifier for the 2019 FIFA Beach Soccer World Cup).

Antigua and Barbuda competed in Group C, losing their opening match 7–4 to the Bahamas national beach soccer team.

This coaching role built on his earlier CONCACAF work in Antigua and Barbuda, where he led training courses and development initiatives in 2015 to introduce and promote the sport.

== Honours ==
United States (Beach)

- Mundialito: 1998

United States (footvolley)

- International tournament (Canada) Champion: 2002
- Kellogg's Footvolley International (Vienna): Runner-up 2004
- U.S. Footvolley National Championships: Runner-up 2005
- U.S. Footvolley National Championships: 2016
