= Beach soccer at the 2019 World Beach Games – Qualification (CONCACAF) =

Beach soccer tournament qualifiers

Beach soccer at the 2019 World Beach Games qualification (CONCACAF)
- 2019 World Beach Games Qualifier – El Salvador
- Official logo

Tournament details
- Host country: El Salvador
- Dates: 3–5 August
- Venue(s): 1 (in 1 host city)
- № of events: 2 (1 men's; 1 women's)
- Teams: 12 (from 8 countries)

Men's event
- Teams: 8
Final positions
Champions	Mexico
Runners-up	El Salvador
Third place	United States
- Matches played: 12
- Goals scored: 126 (10.5 per match)

Women's event
- Teams: 4
Final positions
Champions	Mexico
Runners-up	United States
Third place	El Salvador
- Matches played: 6
- Goals scored: 52 (8.67 per match)

Previous / Next edition
- 2023 →

The CONCACAF qualifiers for the 2019 World Beach Games, known officially as the 2019 World Beach Games – Qualifier El Salvador, was a beach soccer tournament contested by North American national teams who are members of CONCACAF that took place to determine the nations from North, Central America and the Caribbean that qualified to the beach soccer competition at the inaugural edition of the ANOC World Beach Games.

The tournament consisted of two events: the men's qualifiers and the women's qualifiers, the former a knockout competition from which the top two teams qualified, and the latter a round robin contest from which the top two teams also qualified.

Organised by Beach Soccer Worldwide (BSWW), National Sports Institute of El Salvador (INDES) and Salvadoran Football Federation (FESFUT), the competition took place in San Salvador, El Salvador from 3–5 August 2019.

Mexico claimed the crown in both the men's and women's events.

== Venues ==
For both the men's and women's tournaments, a beach soccer pitch installed at the International Centre of Fairs and Conventions (CIFCO) in the city of San Salvador, El Salvador was used to host all matches, with a capacity of 5,000.

== Men's tournament ==
=== Teams ===
The men's event was an eight-team tournament. The entrants are listed below, ordered by their world ranking (June 2019) in parentheses:

1. Mexico (14)
2. United States (17)
3. El Salvador (26) (hosts)
4. Panama (28)
5. Bahamas (38)
6. Trinidad and Tobago (50)
7. Guatemala (68)
8. U.S. Virgin Islands (76)

=== Draw ===
The draw took place internally with most details undisclosed. Teams were organised based on their position in the world ranking in a similar vein to that of the European qualifiers (the hosts were drawn against the team ranked eighth, the best ranked team against the team ranked seventh, second against sixth and fourth against fifth.)

=== Results ===
The competition was played as a straight knockout tournament, starting with the quarter-finals and ending with the final with the winner crowned champions of the event. Meanwhile, the losing nations of each round receded to play in a series of consolation matches in order to determine all final placements.

The two teams that reached the final qualified for the 2019 World Beach Games.

Matches are listed as local time in San Salvador, (UTC–6).

Fifth place
5 August; 12:45; Report
Bahamas	8
Trinidad and Tobago	7
Seventh place
5 August; 11:30; Report
U.S. Virgin Islands	3
Guatemala (a.e.t.)	6

Consolation semifinals
4 August; 11:30; Report
U.S. Virgin Islands	1
Bahamas	8
4 August; 12:45; Report
Trinidad and Tobago	6
Guatemala	4

Quarterfinals
3 August; 18:00; Report
El Salvador	10
U.S. Virgin Islands	1
3 August; 11:30; Report
Panama (p)	7 (3)
Bahamas	7 (2)
3 August; 12:45; Report
United States	9
Trinidad and Tobago	3
3 August; 15:30; Report
Guatemala	3
Mexico	10

Semifinals
4 August; 18:00; Report
El Salvador	4
Panama	2
4 August; 15:30; Report
United States	2 (4)
Mexico (p)	2 (5)

Final
5 August; 18:00; Report
El Salvador	4
Mexico	5
Third place
5 August; 15:30; Report
Panama	6
United States	8

=== Awards ===
==== Winners trophy ====
2019 World Beach Games – CONCACAF Qualifier
champions

Mexico
First title

==== Individual awards ====
Top scorer
(Panama) Alfonso Maquensi
7 goals
Best player
(El Salvador) Exon Perdomo
Best goalkeeper
(Mexico) Diego Villaseñor

Source: BSWW

=== Final standings ===
Rank	Team	Qualification
1st place, gold medalist(s)	Mexico	2019 World Beach Games
2nd place, silver medalist(s)	El Salvador	2019 World Beach Games
3rd place, bronze medalist(s)	United States	
4	Panama	
5	Bahamas	
6	Trinidad and Tobago	
7	Guatemala	
8	U.S. Virgin Islands	

Source: El Grafico

== Women's tournament ==
=== Teams ===
Four teams entered the women's event which are as follows:

1. Bahamas
2. El Salvador (hosts)
3. Mexico
4. United States

=== Results ===
The competition was played as a single round robin tournament; the teams competed to earn points for the overall standings table – the two that accumulated the most points after all the matches were completed qualified for the 2019 World Beach Games.

Matches are listed as local time in San Salvador, (UTC–6).

Pos	Team	Pld	W	W+	WP	L	GF	GA	GD	Pts	Qualification
1st place, gold medalist(s)	Mexico (C)	3	3	0	0	0	15	5	+10	9	2019 World Beach Games
2nd place, silver medalist(s)	United States (Note: Originally, CONCACAF were allocated only one berth at the Games; at the time this event occurred, only the winners Mexico qualified. However, the allocation of berths was later redistributed with CONCACAF now receiving two berths. This meant, as the team finishing second in the event, the United States were awarded with qualification to the Games post factum.)	3	2	0	0	1	17	9	+8	6	2019 World Beach Games
3rd place, bronze medalist(s)	El Salvador (H)	3	1	0	0	2	14	18	−4	3	
4	Bahamas	3	0	0	0	3	6	20	−14	0	

Source: BSWW
(C) Champion; (H) Host
Notes:

3 August 2019	Mexico	2–1	United States
14:00		Report

3 August 2019	Bahamas	3–6	El Salvador
16:45		Report

4 August 2019	Mexico	7–2	Bahamas
14:00		Report

4 August 2019	El Salvador	6–9	United States
16:45		Report

5 August 2019	United States	7–1	Bahamas
14:00		Report

5 August 2019	El Salvador	2–6	Mexico
16:45		Report

=== Awards ===
==== Winners trophy ====
2019 World Beach Games – CONCACAF Qualifier
Champions

Mexico
First title

==== Individual awards ====
Top scorer(s)
(United States) Samantha Witteman
(El Salvador) Carolina Pérez
5 goals
Best player
(Mexico) Fatima Leyva
Best goalkeeper
(Mexico) Daniela Paulin

Source: BSWW

== See also ==
- 2019 FIFA Beach Soccer World Cup qualification (CONCACAF)
