= Aldo Balsano =

American beach soccer goalkeeper

Personal information
- Date of birth: June 5, 1984 (age 42)
- Place of birth: Brazil

College career
Years	Team	Apps	(Gls)
2005-2006	Mercer University		

Senior career*
Years	Team	Apps	(Gls)
2011-2013	Florida Beach Soccer FC		
2013	Miami Soccer Locker		
2014	Miami United (beach soccer)		
2017	Ho Soccer		

International career
2013-2016	United States (beach)	31	(1)

Managerial career
- 2020-: National Beach Soccer League
- * Club domestic league appearances and goals

Aldo Balsano (born 1984) is a Brazilian-born professional beach soccer goalkeeper based in Miami, Florida who represented the U.S. Men's Beach Soccer National Team between 2013 and 2016. In addition to his sports career, he serves as a firefighter and emergency room trauma registered nurse. He is also the founder of the National Beach Soccer League.

== Early life and education ==
Aldo Balsano was born June 5, 1984 in Brazil. played soccer for Mercer University. In 2005, he earned recognition as a member of the Atlantic Sun All-Freshmen Team.

== International career ==
Balsano played as a goalkeeper for the United States men's national beach soccer team from 2013 to 2016. Over 31 appearances, he scored one goal against Japan in Dubai. Balsano made his international debut at the 2014 Beach Soccer Intercontinental Cup, where he scored his only goal in a match against Japan. The following year, he represented the USA at the 2015 CONCACAF Beach Soccer Championship in El Salvador. In 2016, he tied for the team lead with 14 appearances, capping his international career that year. In February 2019, Balsano was called up for a training camp in California.

== Beach soccer ==
=== Club ===
Florida Beach Soccer

He was the goalkeeper for Florida Beach Soccer FC replacing Chris Antonopoulos in goal after an injury. The team won the North American Sand Soccer Championship U.S. Open titles in 2011 and 2012 and were runners-up in 2013. Additional victories included the Clearwater Beach Soccer Tournament in 2010 and 2011, and the BagoSports Beach Football Invitational in Trinidad and Tobago in 2011, where the team went undefeated with a 5–3 final win over Stokely Vale FC.

in 2011 and 2013, he won best Goalkeeper at NASSC.

Miami Soccer Locker

Aldo Balsano played as a goalkeeper for Miami Soccer Locker in the 2013 Bago Beach Football Tournament held at Black Rock Heritage Park Beach in Courland, Tobago. The team reached the final after defeating Whim Sand Strikers 6-3 in the semifinals. Miami faced Trinidad and Tobago in the final.

Miami United

In 2014 he played for Miami United beach soccer team at the NASSC with made it to the quartfinals.

== Managerial ==
Beyond playing, in 2020, he founded the National Beach Soccer League (NBSL) alongside Francis Farberoff.

== Honors ==
North American Sand Soccer Championship

- 2011: Best Goalkeeper
- 2013: Best Goalkeeper
  - Gold: 2011 and 2012
  - Silver: 2013

== Other ==
- Aldo Balsano was nominated for the National Soccer Hall of Fame in 2025.
