= Beach soccer at the 2023 World Beach Games =

- Location: Bali, Indonesia (cancelled)
- Dates: 6–12 August (cancelled)
- Competitors: 336 (expected)
- Teams: 28

The beach soccer tournaments at the 2023 World Beach Games were due to held from 6 to 12 August 2023 in Bali, Indonesia and organised by the Association of National Olympic Committees (ANOC). However, on 4 July 2023, the Games were announced as cancelled due to the last minute withdrawal of the Indonesian Olympic Committee as hosts. Thus, the beach soccer tournaments never took place, despite preliminary qualification competitions having already been carried out.

Two events were due to take place: the men's tournament and the women's tournament. A total of 28 teams were due to participate (16 in the men's competition and 12 in the women's). Both the men's and women's squads were to consist of up to 12 players, meaning a total of 336 athletes were expected to take part.

== Competition schedule ==
The tournament was due to begin on 6 August and end on 12 August.

== Qualification ==
Each National Olympic Committee (NOC) was allowed to enter one men's team and one women's team into the competition. In order to play at the Games, these teams needed to qualify.

The six continental confederations of FIFA were each allocated a certain amount of berths at the Games; qualification events were organised for teams to compete against other members of their own confederation to try and earn one of their continent's spots at the Games. ANOC delegated the responsibility of organising qualification to Beach Soccer Worldwide (BSWW). Qualification tournaments were for all confederations, however, for some, these qualification events were ultimately not be realised – in these cases, their teams which occupy the highest positions in the BSWW World Ranking as of 1 July 2023 were due to be granted qualification. The deadline for qualification to be completed was 2 July 2023.

For both categories, the host country qualified automatically and one country who failed to qualify was also due to be invited to compete as a wildcard entry as a lucky loser.

Multiple qualification tournaments had already been completed by the time of the Games' cancellation on 4 July 2023, with most participants confirmed.

=== Men's qualification ===
Means of qualification	Ref.	Dates	Venue	Berths	Qualified
Hosts		24 May 2022 (Note: Refers to the publication date of the qualification system when it was revealed the hosts qualify automatically.)	—	1	Indonesia
2022 UEFA Qualifying Tournament		29 August – 4 September 2022	(Italy) Catania	5	Italy; Portugal; Spain; Switzerland; Ukraine
2023 African Beach Games		27–30 June 2023	(Tunisia) Hammamet	2	Morocco; Senegal
Beach soccer at the 2023 World Beach Games – Qualification (AFC–OFC)/2023 AFC–OFC Qualifying Tournament (Beach_soccer_at_the_2023_World_Beach_Games#2023_AFC–OFC_Qualifying_Tournament)		25–27 May 2023	(Saudi Arabia) Jeddah	2	Iran; United Arab Emirates
2023 CONCACAF Qualifying Tournament		6–8 April 2023	(El Salvador) San Luis La Herradura	2	El Salvador; United States
BSWW World Ranking (Top ranked CONMEBOL teams)		—	—	3	Never confirmed (Note: As of the qualification completion deadline of 2 July 2023, no preliminary qualification tournaments for the CONMEBOL region had been carried out. Per the qualification regulations, this meant that, as per the latest issue of the BSWW World Ranking, the top three men's CONMEBOL teams, and top two women's CONMEBOL teams, were to be granted the berths. These were Brazil, Paraguay and Uruguay (men's); Brazil and Paraguay (women's). However, the teams were not officially confirmed by BSWW before the Games were announced as cancelled on 4 July 2023.)
Wildcard		—	—	1	Never confirmed (Note: The wildcard entries were not officially confirmed by BSWW before the Games were announced as cancelled on 4 July 2023. However, a media release by the Solomon Islands Football Federation on 3 July stated that its men's national team was preparing to participate.)
Total				16	

=== Women's qualification ===
Means of qualification	Ref.	Dates	Venue	Berths	Qualified
Hosts		24 May 2022	—	1	Indonesia
2022 UEFA Qualifying Tournament		31 August – 4 September 2022	(Italy) Catania	4	Great Britain (Note: Competed in qualification as England. England does not have an independent NOC and is instead represented by Great Britain at Olympic events.); Italy; Spain; Ukraine
2023 African Beach Games		28 June 2023	(Tunisia) Hammamet	1	Kenya (Note: The Kenyan national team was due to play a best-of-three tie against Cape Verde to determine who would qualify to the Games, however the latter withdrew at the last minute, meaning Kenya qualified on a walkover.)
Invitation (AFC–OFC team)		—	—	1	Never confirmed (Note: As of the qualification completion deadline of 2 July 2023, no women's preliminary qualification tournament for the AFC–OFC region had been carried out. Per the qualification regulations, this meant that, as per the latest issue of the BSWW World Ranking, the top women's AFC–OFC team was to be granted the berth. However, no AFC–OFC women's teams were ranked at the time. Per the qualification regulations, it was then expected that a National Olympic Committee of the region would be invited to send a team. However, the team was not officially confirmed by BSWW before the Games were announced as cancelled on 4 July 2023.)
2023 CONCACAF Qualifying Tournament		6–8 April 2023	(El Salvador) San Luis La Herradura	2	El Salvador; United States
BSWW World Ranking (Top ranked CONMEBOL teams)		—	—	2	Never confirmed
Wildcard		—	—	1	Never confirmed
Total				12	

== 2023 AFC–OFC Qualifying Tournament ==
https://roonbasports.com/beachsoccer/men/2023.html

https://roonbasports.com/beachsoccer/women/2023.html

No entrant in women

7 / 6 teams in men (one team withdraw)

World Beach Games Qualifier Asia, Quarter-Final:

United Arab Emirates 3-2 Oman After extra time

Iran 7-2 Thailand

World Beach Games Qualifier Asia, Semi-Final:

United Arab Emirates 5-4 Saudi Arabia After extra time

Iran 4-3 Japan

World Beach Games Qualifier Asia, Final:

5th Place Match

Oman 7-2 Thailand

3rd Place Match

Japan 6-3 Saudi Arabia

Final

Iran 2-5 United Arab Emirates

== Medal summary ==
Event	Gold	Silver	Bronze
Men's tournament	Competition cancelled.	Competition cancelled.	Competition cancelled.
Women's tournament	Competition cancelled.	Competition cancelled.	Competition cancelled.

== See also ==
- 2023 FIFA Beach Soccer World Cup
- Beach soccer at the 2023 European Games
