= Florida Beach Soccer FC =

Beach soccer team (2010–2013)

- Full name: Florida Beach Soccer Football Club
- Nicknames: Florida Beach Soccer; FBS-FC
- Founded: 2010
- Dissolved: 2013
- Ground: Fort Lauderdale / Miami, Florida
- GM & HC: Chris Antonopoulos
- President: Erich Khunke
Home colours
Away colours

Florida Beach Soccer FC was a professional beach soccer team based in Miami, Florida, United States, active from 2010 to 2013. Founded by multiple U.S. Beach Soccer National Team players, the team achieved significant success in national and international competitions and winning multiple championships.

== History ==
Florida Beach Soccer FC was established in 2010 by a group of U.S. National Beach Soccer Team players. The team quickly rose to prominence in the U.S. beach soccer scene, competing in high-profile tournaments across North America and the Caribbean. The team was built from the ground-up into a championship winning team. In addition to its competitive achievements, Florida Beach Soccer FC also fostered the development of beach soccer talent through a youth soccer program.

Several players from the U.S. Beach Soccer National Team, took part in coaching youth teams under the FBS umbrella. This initiative helped grow the sport in South Florida and provided an opportunity for young athletes to train with some of the top beach soccer players in the world.

The team also received national exposure through the winter edition of USL Breakaway on Fox Soccer Channel, which helped grow its visibility and expand the sport’s reach. Furthermore, the team entered into a five-year sponsorship deal with Admiral Sportswear, strengthening its business model and supporting its professional ambitions.

== Club leadership ==
- President: Erich Kuhnke
- Head Coach / General Manager: Chris Antonopoulos
- Coach: Roberto Ceciliano
- Team Captain: Francis Farberoff

== Players ==
Notable Players (with confirmed US Beach MNT or pro affiliations):

- Chris Antonopoulos, Club original goalkeeper, head coach and general manager. He is a former FIU and Fort Lauderdale Strikers goalkeeper; U.S. National Beach Soccer Team (goalkeeper and assistant coach 2002-2006).
- Erich Kuhnke, Club President and player; former Coastal Carolina and Miami Freedom player.
- Benyam Astorga, veteran of multiple Concacaf Beach/FIFA Beach Soccer WC events; former head coach of Trinidad & Tobago Beach Soccer; current US Beach MNT assistant coach.
- Oscar Gil, played for US Beach and Futsal National Teams; Miami FC, Vasco de Gama (beach).
- Francis Farberoff, club captain, Former US Beach MNT player (2000-2014) and captain, 4x BS World Cup participant; current Bahamas Beach MNT coach.
- Nick Perera, a key player in the 2012 US Open win; future US Beach MNT captain (2013–); indoor player.
- Aldo Balsano, veteran US Beach MNT goalkeeper (2013–2016); founder of NBSL.
- Betto Lima, Former Barry University and US Beach MNT player; CONCACAF beach soccer official; assistant Olympic coach for 2016 USA footvolley.
- Reggie Pierre Jerome: A former professional soccer goalkeeper for the Miami Fusion and former beach USA player.

Additional Squad Members:

- Gustavo Lopez
- Omar Jones
- Julio Alonso
- Chad Smith
- Marcos Amormin
- Daniel Fernandez
- Marcus Chantel
- Frank Rubio
- Erick Arevalo
- Alex Texiera (won MVP at 2012 NASSC)

== Competitive record ==
Below is a chart summarizing the championships and key results (2010–2013).

Year	Tournament	Result	Details
2010	North American Sand Soccer Championship U.S. Open	3rd place	Held in Virginia Beach, VA; Florida Beach Soccer placed third in the professional U.S. Open division championship.
2010	Clearwater Beach Soccer Tournament	Champions	Hosted in Clearwater, FL; part of the Major Beach Soccer National Championship Series by the United Soccer League. Won the title.
2011	North American Sand Soccer Championship U.S. Open	Champions	Held in Virginia Beach, VA; secured the U.S. Open national championship.
2011	BagoSports Beach Football Invitational	Champions	In Trinidad and Tobago; went undefeated, winning the Caribbean Championship with a 5–3 final victory over Stokely Vale FC.
2011	Beach Soccer Championship	3rd place	Wins over JBSN Selection (7–2), Shoreline Beach Soccer Club (5–3), and an upset over San Diego Sockers (4–3), before losing in the semi-final to the US Beach Soccer National Team (4–6) and securing third place with a 10–3 consolation win over Nacional da Madeira.
2011	Clearwater Beach Soccer Tournament	Champions	Hosted in Clearwater, FL; defended their title from 2010, going back-to-back.
2012	North American Sand Soccer Championship U.S. Open	Champions	Held in Virginia Beach, VA; successfully defended their 2011 national title, going back-to-back.
2013	North American Sand Soccer Championship U.S. Open	Runners-Up	Held in Virginia Beach, VA; finished second, narrowly missing a third consecutive U.S. Open national title, losing to HRSC in the finals.

== Post-development ==
After their active years from 2009 to 2013, key figures from Florida Beach Soccer FC pursued new ventures within the soccer community:

- FBS FC (Futbol, Beach Soccer, Futsal Club): In 2014, Francis Farberoff and Oscar Gil co-founded FBS FC, a youth soccer club based in Miami, dedicated to promoting and developing youth soccer in North Miami and South Broward. Farberoff continues to serve as the club's president.
- Miami United FC: In 2014, Erich Kuhnke co-founded Miami United. Which made it to the quarterfinals at the 2014 NASSC U.S. Open.
- Chris Antonopoulos: Following his tenure with Florida Beach Soccer FC, Antonopoulos shifted his focus to private youth coaching, contributing to the development of young soccer talent in the Palm Beach region.

== Legacy ==
Florida Beach Soccer FC played an important role in the development of beach soccer in the U.S., winning at least five documented titles and contributing to the growth of the sport in South Florida. Their success coincided with efforts to professionalize beach soccer in the United States. The team's participation in media coverage through Fox Soccer Channel and a sponsorship deal with Admiral Sportswear reflected the increasing visibility of beach soccer as a competitive sport.
