= El Salvador women's national beach soccer team =

Women's national beach soccer team representing El Salvador

El Salvador
- Nickname(s): Selecta Playera femenina La azul playera femenina La azul y blanco femenina
- Association: Salvadoran Football Federation
- Confederation: CONCACAF
- Head coach: Elías Ramírez
- Captain: Fátima Pérez
- FIFA code: SLV
- BSWW ranking: 10 (9 April 2025)
First colours
Second colours

First international
- El Salvador 6–3 Bahamas (San Salvador, El Salvador; 3 August 2019)

Biggest win
- El Salvador 13–3 Costa Rica (San Salvador, El Salvador; 14 February 2025)

Biggest defeat
- El Salvador 2–6 Mexico (San Salvador, El Salvador; 5 August 2019)

The El Salvador women's national beach soccer team (Spanish: Selección de Fútbol Playa Femenina de El Salvador) represents El Salvador in women's international beach soccer competitions and is governed by the Salvadoran Football Federation (FESFUT).

== History ==
With no official tournaments or competitions for women's beach soccer in place, few nations around the world had established women's national teams. In the absence of regional and continental championships, El Salvador did not form its women's team until 2019. That year, the team was inaugurated to participate in the CONCACAF qualifying tournament for the inaugural 2019 World Beach Games. Hosting the event in San Salvador, La Selecta made their international debut with a 6–3 win over the Bahamas on 3 August 2019. However, defeats to the United States and Mexico in the following matches meant El Salvador failed to qualify for the main tournament.

In April 2022, El Salvador hosted the inaugural El Salvador Beach Soccer Cup. As in the previous qualifier, the team managed a win over the Bahamas but lost to the United States and Argentina. In 2023, El Salvador made a second attempt to qualify for the World Beach Games, this time for the edition scheduled to take place in Bali. The team went undefeated in the CONCACAF qualifiers, defeating all three opponents and securing their first-ever qualification for a global tournament. However, the Games were cancelled a few months later.

El Salvador used the momentum from their qualification campaign to continue their development, finishing as runners-up in the 2024 El Salvador Beach Soccer Cup before claiming the title in 2025.

== Players ==
=== Current squad ===
The following players were selected for the squad for the 2025 El Salvador Beach Soccer Cup, held from 14 to 16 February 2025.

No.	Pos.	Player	Date of birth (age)	Club
1	GK	Beatriz Argumedo	24 December 1998 (age 27)	
12	GK	Yahaira Maravilla	24 April 2001 (age 25)	
2	DF	Daniela Rivera	14 September 1997 (age 28)	
4	DF	Katherine Segovia	6 July 2005 (age 20)	
3	MF	Ingrid Ramos	13 March 1991 (age 35)	
5	MF	Yaritza Durán	24 June 1994 (age 31)	
7	MF	Sindy Acevedo	23 April 1999 (age 27)	
9	MF	Irma Cordero	3 September 1998 (age 27)	
6	FW	Sandra Tamacas	8 January 1993 (age 33)	
8	FW	Cindy Turcios	27 December 1996 (age 29)	
10	FW	Paola Calderón	19 March 2002 (age 24)	
11	FW	Fátima Pérez (Captain)	13 November 1999 (age 26)	

== Competitive record ==
=== ANOC World Beach Games ===
World Beach Games record									Qualification record							
Year	Result	Pld	W	W+	WP	L	GF	GA	Result	Pld	W	W+	WP	L	GF	GA
(Qatar) 2019	Did not qualify								Third place	3	1	0	0	2	14	18
(Indonesia) 2023	Qualified, later cancelled								Champions	3	3	0	0	0	15	7
Total:	0/1	—	—	—	—	—	—	—	2/2	6	4	0	0	2	29	25

=== El Salvador Beach Soccer Cup ===
El Salvador Beach Soccer Cup record
Year	Result	Pld	W	W+	WP	L	GF	GA
(El Salvador) 2022	Third place	3	1	0	0	2	12	12
(El Salvador) 2024	Runners-up	3	1	0	1	1	12	5
(El Salvador) 2025	Champions	3	3	0	0	0	22	10
(El Salvador) 2026	Champions	3	2	0	0	1	9	6
Total:	4/4	12	7	0	1	4	55	33
