= Joshua Lubwama =

Ugandan association footballer

Personal information
- Full name: Joshua Lubwama
- Date of birth: May 25, 1998 (age 28)
- Place of birth: Luwero District, Uganda
- Height: 1.88 m (6 ft 2 in)
- Position: Defensive midfielder

Team information
- Current team: URA Football Club

Youth career
- BUL FC

Senior career*
Years	Team	Apps	(Gls)
2020	Wakiso Giants		(0)

International career
- Uganda Sand Cranes (AFCON 2022)
	Uganda		(0)
- * Club domestic league appearances and goals

Joshua Lubwama aka Letti, Song, Tallest Muganda (born 25 May 1998) is a Ugandan professional football player who plays as the defensive midfielder for Uganda Revenue Authority SC (URAFC). Lubwama achieved some international experience having represented Uganda in the CAF Champions League beach soccer Africa Cup of Nations (AFCON) in Mozambique.

== Educational background ==
Lubwama was born at Kasana Health Center IV in Luweero, to parents Eric Kigozi Ssebwalunyo and Annet Ggaliwango. Joshua Lubwama is the half-brother of Hannington Sebwalunyo (National Enterprise Corporation FC). He began his education at African Outreach Academy in Luweero for primary school, then attended Ndejje Secondary School for both O-Level and A-Level studies. He later joined Makerere University, where he earned a degree in Mental Health and Community Psychology."

Lubwama has often mentioned Daniel Kasoma (Makerere University) and Nicholas Kabonge (captain of Kampala University and player for Lungujja Galaxy) among his favorite teammates he's played alongside", along with Alexander Song, Kanu Nkwanko, Tonny Mawejje as his role models.

== Club career ==
On 1 September 2023, the player transferred from Wakiso Giants to URA FC in Uganda where he currently plays. In January 2020, he had moved from Kampala Capital City Authority FC to Wakiso Giants, marking a significant step in his football career across top Ugandan Premier League clubs.

In the past, Lubwama featured for Luweero United, BUL Jinja FC and Ndejje University FC before joining Wakiso Giants. He has also been part of the Uganda national beach soccer team (Sand Cranes) set up that qualified for back-to-back AFCON Beach Soccer. Lubwama played for St. Lawrence University Beach Soccer Club in the National Beach Soccer League.

== Awards and nominations ==
- Luweero Kids League Champion (Measles Cup)
- Sportsman of the year 2012 – Ndejje S.S.S
- Sports personality of the year Makerere University 2014
- 2015 & 2016, 2nd Runners Up Buleemzi Ssaaza
- 1st Runners Up East Africa University Games (2014) – Football
- Man of the match UFL vs Kampala University, Kyambogo (Quarter final)
