= National Beach Soccer League =

American beach soccer organization

The National Beach Soccer League (NBSL) is an American organization dedicated to the development and promotion of beach soccer for men, women, and youth across the United States. The NBSL organizes tournaments, clinics, camps, and training programs to foster talent and grow the sport’s popularity.

== History ==
The NBSL was established in 2019 to address the growing interest in beach soccer, a 5-a-side variant of soccer played on sand, which had gained global traction through events like the FIFA Beach Soccer World Cup. Founder Aldo Balsano, a former U.S. Beach Soccer National Team goalkeeper, aimed to create a structured platform to develop domestic talent and elevate the sport’s visibility in the U.S.

By 2024, the NBSL had expanded its reach, hosting high-profile events like the USGC/NBSL Fort Lauderdale Open, which featured professional men’s, women’s, and youth divisions. The league gained recognition for attracting top players and serving as a scouting ground for the U.S. Men’s and Women’s Beach Soccer National Teams, with coaches like Francis Farberoff, Benyam Astorga, and Morgan Church

== Gameplay and rules ==
The NBSL adheres to FIFA Beach Soccer Laws of the Game, with matches played on a sand pitch measuring approximately 35–37 meters by 26–28 meters. Key rules include:

- Team Size: 5 players per side (including a goalkeeper), with unlimited rolling substitutions.
- Game Duration: Three 12-minute periods, with a 3-minute break between periods.
- Scoring: Goals can be scored from anywhere on the pitch, often via acrobatic volleys or free kicks. A goal after the whistle (e.g., from a foul) counts if scored before the referee stops play.
- Free Kicks: All fouls result in direct free kicks; there are no walls, and the kicker has 4 seconds to shoot or pass.
- Surface: Played barefoot on leveled sand, requiring balance and agility.

Matches are fast-paced, averaging 10–12 goals per game, with an emphasis on flair, overhead kicks, and goalkeeper throws to spark attacks. The NBSL’s events maintain these rules to ensure consistency with global competitions.

== Events and tournaments ==
The NBSL organizes a variety of events, including tournaments, clinics, and camps, primarily in coastal regions. Its flagship event is the USGC/NBSL Fort Lauderdale Open, held annually in Fort Lauderdale, Florida. The 2024 edition, the second of its kind, featured:

- Pro Men’s Division: Won by Beach Soccer Virginia Beach.
- Pro Women’s Division: Won by Cali BS.
- Youth Divisions: Open to various age groups, fostering young talent.
- Amateur/Open Divisions: For recreational players and community engagement.

Individual awards at the 2024 Fort Lauderdale Open included:

- Men’s Rising Star
- Men’s Golden Glove
- Men’s Golden Toe (8 goals)
- Men’s MVP

The NBSL also hosts training camps and exhibition matches.

Others included

2025

- Ft. Lauderdale 2025 Open

2024

- NBSL Spring Classic 2024

2023

- Ft. Lauderdale 2023 Open

2022

- NBSL All Stars – Canada (April)
- NBSL Kick-Off Cup (April)
- NBSL All Stars – Canada (October)
- Columbus Day ID Clash (October)
- Sand Bahamas – NBSL All Stars (February)
- NBSL Kick-Off Tournament / Coast Guard Tournament – Ft. Lauderdale Open (January)
- Clinic with Atlantis University (August)
- NBSL ID Camp (August)
- NBSL & Prodigy Foundation Kids Clinic / NBSL Showdown (January)
- NBSL Player ID Cup / NBSL Valentine ID Cup (January)
- NBSL Men’s Camp
- NBSL vs. Bahamas (January)
- NBSL Qualifier ID Cup
- NBSL All-Stars at NASSC
- NBSL World Cup Showcase
- NBSL Women’s Camp
- Celebrity Soccer League

== Notable players ==
- Cody Valcarcel (Beach Soccer VB): 2024 Fort Lauderdale Open MVP, U.S. National Team member.
- Austin Collier (Beach Soccer VB): Golden Glove winner, goalkeeper for 2025 Concacaf Championship roster.
- Juan Paulino (Punta Hermosa): Scored 8 goals to win 2024 Golden Toe award.
- Lukas Holocher (Beach Soccer VB): Rising Star awardee, emerging talent.
- Fredo Dilbert (FBS-FC): MVP

== See also ==
- Beach Soccer
