= Jennifer Muñoz =

Jennifer Muñoz may refer to:

- Jennifer Muñoz (footballer, born 1993), Guatemalan international footballer and American beach soccer player
- Jennifer Muñoz (footballer, born 1996), Mexican international football midfielder
