= Morgan Church =

American soccer coach and former professional player

Personal information
- Position: Forward

Youth career
- Marshall University
- University of Charleston
- Berry College

Senior career*
Years	Team	Apps	(Gls)
- Washington Freedom
- Tampa Bay Hellenic
- Carolina Dynamo
- Northern Virginia Majestics

Managerial career
- 2006–2011: University of North Florida (assistant)
- 2006–2007: Washington Freedom (assistant commissioner)
- 2011–2014: University of North Florida (associate head)
- 2014–2016: Gonzaga University (AC)
- 2021–2024: Jacksonville FC (technical director)
- 2023–present: U.S. Women’s Beach Soccer (HC)
- * Club domestic league appearances and goals

Morgan Church is an American soccer coach serving as the head coach of the U.S. Women’s Beach Soccer National Team since at least 2023. She previously held coaching roles at the University of North Florida, Gonzaga University, and Jacksonville FC. As a player, Church competed at the collegiate level for Marshall University, the University of Charleston, and Berry College, and professionally in the W-League, winning a championship with the Washington Freedom.

== Early life and education ==
Morgan Church graduated from Berry College, where she earned a Bachelor’s degree in Psychology, graduating magna cum laude.

== Playing career ==
=== College ===
Church began her college soccer career at Marshall University as a freshman. She transferred to the University of Charleston for her sophomore and junior years, earning two All-Mountain East Conference honors and leading the team in scoring both seasons. She completed her collegiate career at Berry College, starting 19 of 20 matches and leading the team with 12 goals.

=== Professional ===
After college, Church played professionally in the USL W-League. She contributed to the Washington Freedom’s W-League Championship victory. She played in the same league with the Tampa Bay Hellenic, Carolina Dynamo, and Northern Virginia Majestics.

== Coaching career ==
=== University of North Florida (2006–2014) ===
Church started her coaching career at the University of North Florida in 2006, initially as an assistant coach before becoming Associate Head Coach in 2011. During her tenure, she coached 12 Atlantic Sun All-Conference players, seven All-Freshman honorees, the 2010 Freshman of the Year, and two CoSIDA Academic All-Americans. The team received five NSCAA Team-Academic Awards under her guidance.

=== Gonzaga University (2014–2016) ===
In 2014, Church joined Gonzaga University as an assistant coach for the women’s soccer team. In her first season, she helped the team achieve its first winning season since 2007, finishing with a 4–4–1 record in the West Coast Conference and ranking in the top 100 in two national ranking services.

=== Jacksonville FC (2021–2024) ===
From 2021 to 2024, Church served as the Technical Director-Girls and ECNL Director for Jacksonville FC. She significantly impacted player and club development, earning praise for her leadership and professionalism from Jacksonville FC executive Pat Cannon.

=== U.S. Women’s Beach Soccer National Team (2023–present) ===
Since at least 2023, Church has been the head coach of the U.S. Women’s Beach Soccer National Team. She has led the team in international competitions, including the 2023 Mundialito Beach Soccer Tournament, 2024 El Salvador Beach Soccer Cup, 2024 BSWW Acapulco Beach Soccer Cup, and 2025 El Salvador Beach Soccer Cup. Under her leadership, the team achieved a 5–1–0 record in 2023 and won the 2023 Acapulco Beach Soccer Tournament.

=== Other roles ===
Church served as Assistant Commissioner for the Washington Freedom from 2006 to 2007. She has coached in the Florida Olympic Development Program, Region 1 and Region 3 Olympic Development, Jacksonville FC, Creeks Soccer Club, and was Director of Coaching at the U.S. Training Center.

Church is also a coach for the National Beach Soccer League.

== Coaching licenses ==
Church holds a USSF 'A' Coaching License, an NSCAA Regional Goalkeeper License, and an NSCAA Professional Development Certificate.
