= Jennifer Muñoz (footballer, born 1993) =

Guatemalan-American beach soccer player and footballer (b. 1993)

Jen Munoz
Personal information
- Full name: Jennifer Eunice Munoz
- Date of birth: December 31, 1993 (age 32)
- Place of birth: Costa Mesa, California, U.S.
- Height: 5 ft 5 in (1.65 m)
- Positions: Defender; midfielder; forward

Team information
- Current team: Botafogo USA (beach soccer)

College career
Years	Team	Apps	(Gls)
2012–2013	Golden West Rustlers	35	(12)
2014–2015	Martin Methodist RedHawks	41	(25)

Senior career*
Years	Team	Apps	(Gls)
2017	F.C. Indiana	10	(2)
2018	Puerto Rico Sol	9	(3)
- Botafogo USA (beach soccer)

International career
2014	Guatemala	2	(1)

Managerial career
- 2016: Martin Methodist RedHawks (assistant)
- * Club domestic league appearances and goals

Jennifer Eunice Muñoz Sandoval (Note: In this Spanish name, the first or paternal surname is Muñoz and the second or maternal family name is Sandoval.) (born December 31, 1993) is a beach soccer player and former soccer player who plays for beach soccer club Botafogo USA. Born in the United States, She played as a forward for the Guatemala national soccer team, but now currently plays for the United States national beach soccer team after a nation change on March 16, 2026.

== College career ==
Raised in Costa Mesa, California, Munoz began her college career in 2012, being a defender and forward for the Golden West Rustlers. As a freshman, she played 14 matches, scored 2 goals and made 1 assist. Next season, as a sophomore, she transitioned definitely into a forward and improved her performance, playing 21 matches, scoring 10 goals and making 6 assists.

In 2014, Munoz moved to the Martin Methodist RedHawks, where she began to play as a midfielder (besides forward). Like her stint at Golden West College, her second year at Martin Methodist was better than the first. While as a junior she scored 4 goals and made two assists in 21 matches, as a senior she scored 21 goals (being the team top goalscorer) and made 8 assists in 20 matches. She finished her college career as a player in late 2015, but continued in the RedHawks as a volunteer assistant during the 2016 season.

== Club career ==
Munoz played for United Women's Soccer team FC Indiana in 2017. She signed with Puerto Rico Sol in July 2018. There, she was reassigned as a defender.

== International career ==
Besides the United States, Munoz qualified to represent Guatemala in FIFA-regulated competitions through descent. She holds dual American and Guatemalan citizenship.

=== Football ===
Munoz played for the Guatemala national team during the 2016 CONCACAF Women's Olympic Qualifying Championship.

=== Beach soccer ===
In February 2023, Munoz was called up to the United States national team and once again on October 9, 2025, and March 13, 2026. During this time, she was unable to make her debut as her previous official soccer appearances for Guatemala forced her to ask permission to FIFA first.

On March 16, 2026, Munoz's request to her switch international allegiance to the United States was approved by FIFA.
