= Reggie Pierre-Jerome =

Haitian-American soccer player and coach (born 1969)

Personal information
- Full name: Reginald Pierre-Jerome
- Date of birth: September 22, 1969 (age 57)
- Place of birth: Haiti
- Height: 6 ft 0 in (1.83 m)
- Position: Goalkeeper

Youth career
- 1984–1987: McArthur High School
- 1988: Miami Dade CC
- 1989–1991: Coastal Carolina

Senior career*
Years	Team	Apps	(Gls)
1994	Fort Lauderdale Strikers		(0)
1995	Lauderhill Lions	2	(0)
1995	Dallas Sidekicks (indoor)		(0)
1997	Charleston Battery		(0)
1997	Florida Stars		(0)
1998	Miami Breakers	12	(0)
1998	Miami Fusion	1	(0)
2011	Florida Beach Soccer FC		

International career
1990–1991	Haiti U23		
1991–1994	Haiti		
- United States (beach)

Managerial career
- McArthur High School (assistant)
- Coastal Carolina (assistant)
- 1999: FIU (assistant)
- Barry University (assistant)
- 2015: Haiti Women's National Team (gk coach)
- 2016–: Nova Southeastern (gk coach)
- * Club domestic league appearances and goals

Reginald "Reggie" Pierre-Jerome (born September 22, 1969) is a Haitian-American former professional soccer goalkeeper and current coach. He played professionally in Major League Soccer with the Miami Fusion, as well as in the American Professional Soccer League and the USISL. At the international level, he represented the Haiti national soccer team at both youth and senior levels. He currently serves as the goalkeeper coach for the Nova Southeastern University Sharks women's soccer team.

== Early life and college career ==
Pierre-Jerome graduated from McArthur High School in 1987 where he earned All-Broward soccer honors three times.

He played one season as goalkeeper with Miami Date Community College before transferring and playing as a three-year starter in goal for Coastal Carolina University. In 1990, he was named Big South Conference Goalkeeper of the Year after the Chanticleers achieved a Top-20 national ranking. That season, he led the NCAA Division I South Region with a 0.87 goals-against average.

== Professional career ==
Pierre-Jerome turned professional after his collegiate career and competed in several leagues.

He began his senior career with the Lauderhill Lions in the Gold Coast Soccer League in 1995, helping the team post a strong 15–2–1 record and reach the championship game.

He also played for the Fort Lauderdale Strikers in the APSL in 1994. He spent the 1997 season Charleston Battery in the USISL A-League. In 1998 with the Miami Breakers in the USISL D-3, he made 12 appearances with a 1.08 goals-against average as the team finished 17–1 and won the Southeast Division title.

He received a call-up to Major League Soccer and signed the Miami Fusion in August 1998.

He was also selected in the first round of the 1995 draft by the Dallas Sidekicks of the Continental Indoor Soccer League. During the 1996–1997 season, he played professional indoor soccer for the Florida Stars of the National Soccer League (NSL).

In 1997 he won the Copa Latina with the Haiti Select team. In 2001, he played as goalkeeper for a Haitian All-Stars select team in a U.S. Open Cup match against the Miami Fusion.

== International career ==
Pierre-Jerome represented Haiti at the youth level, appearing for the U-23 national team at the 1991 Pan American Games.

He also participated in senior Haiti National Football Team 1991 through 1994 for qualifying matches for the 1991 Barcelona Olympics and the 1994 FIFA World Cup.

Additionally, he trained with the United States national team, Peruvian club Alianza Lima, and French side Paris FC.

Pierre-Jerome also played early on for the United States Beach Soccer National Team.

== Coaching career ==
In the late 1990s, Pierre-Jerome coached at his alma mater, serving as an assistant coach for the McArthur High School boys' soccer team under head coach Roger Westacott.

Pierre-Jerome has served as goalkeeper trainer for the Haitian Men’s National Team and assisted programs such as Coastal Carolina University, Florida International University (FIU), and Barry University as an assistant coach.

In 2015 he was called up as the goalkeeping coach for the Haiti Women's National Team for their international friendly series against the U.S. Women's National Team.

At Nova Southeastern University, he works as goalkeeper coach for the women's soccer program. He has been credited with helping develop keepers such as Natalie Robayna and Ida Norstrom.

He also directs goalkeeping development at the Plantation Eagles Soccer Club and works full-time as Assistant Principal at Crystal Lake Middle School.

== Honors ==
=== Player ===
Coastal Carolina Chanticleers

- Big South Conference Goalkeeper of the Year: 1990
- First-Team All-Big South Conference: 1990

Haiti Select

- Copa Latina: 1997

Miami Breakers

- USISL D-3 Pro League Southeast Division Title: 1998

=== Individual and youth ===
- McArthur High School All-Broward County Selection: (3x) 1985, 1986, 1987
- NCAA Division I South Region Goals-Against Average Leader (0.87): 1990

== Personal life ==
Pierre-Jerome holds a B.S. and M.Ed. in education, along with an NSCAA national goalkeeping license.

Pierre-Jerome is married to his wife Joan and has two children, daughter Milan and son Sebastian.

His daughter, Milan Pierre-Jerome, played NCAA Division I soccer for the University of Maryland and George Mason University, and represented the Haiti Women's National Team at the 2018 FIFA U-20 Women's World Cup in France.
