= USA Footvolley =

United States Footvolley
- Abbreviation: USA-F
- Formation: 2003
- Type: National governing body (NGB)
- Purpose: Organizing competitive footvolley in the USA
- Headquarters: Sunny Isles Beach, Florida, U.S.
- Region served: United States
- Members: 2,000+
- Official language: English
- Executive Director: Sergio Menezes
- Website: www.usafootvolley.org

USA Footvolley is the national governing body for footvolley in the United States. It is in charge of selecting the United States Footvolley team and any other teams which officially represent the United States, as well as the overall organization and operation of the sport within the country, in accordance with the Amateur Sports Act. The national headquarters is located in Sunny Isles Beach, Florida.

== History ==
Footvolley was created by Octavio de Moraes in 1965 in Rio de Janeiro's Copacabana Beach. The game of footvolley was first called 'pevoley', literally meaning "footvolley", that was discarded for "futevôlei". Footvolley started in Rio de Janeiro, but cities like Recife, Salvador, Brasília, Goiânia, Santos and Florianópolis have players who have been playing footvolley since the 1970s.

Teams of footvolley had five a side at first. Due to the skill level of the footvolley athletes (nearly all were professional football players), the ball would rarely drop. The players began lowering the number of players on each side, eventually settling on 2 versus 2, which is still in use today.

The first International Footvolley event to occur outside of Brazil was in 2003 by the United States Footvolley Association on Miami Beach at the 2003 Fitness Festival. Brazilian athletes, Wellington Correa 'Helinho' and Renan were the champions of the competition, but the sport gained steam for international development.

In 2016, the City of Sunny Isles Beach, FL provided USA Footvolley its official training centre, where the national team trains.

== Organizational structure ==
There are several parts and levels that make up USA Footvolley. There is the National governing body (national) level, the Zone (regional) level, and the Local Footvolley Committee (local/state) level.

=== Pro Footvolley Tour rules ===
The rules in the United States professional tour Pro Footvolley Tour are designed to make the matches faster and more aggressive. Some of the notable differences include net height of 2.10 meters, and 2-pointers are awarded up to 3-times maximum per set for all shots scored with the foot when one foot goes above the head when striking the ball and the other foot is off the ground (bikes, matrix kicks, etc.). Pro Footvolley Tour airs on Root Sports, Comcast SportsNet, Time Warner SportsChannel, Bright House Networks, WapaDeportes, and CaribVision. DirecTV Pro Footvolley Tour can be seen in the entire United States and Puerto Rico.

=== National Championship/US Open ===
The National Championship is meet at the conclusion of each season across the country. They are also of the invitational meet format and offer extremely high level competition. Only a small percentage of people who ever play footvolley will make it to this high level of competition. This meet is generally used to determine the US National Team for various international level meets each year, but is not used to determine the US Olympic Team.

=== US Olympic Trials ===
In 2016, the United States Olympic Trials were held for the first time on June 25 in Seaside, Oregon, as part of the Rio Olympics exhibition tournament. United States citizenship was required to compete at this meet since only United States citizens are allowed to represent the United States at the Olympics. The Olympic Trials are also under unique requirements made by the United States Footvolley Association (USFA).

Trials meets are also held for the World Championships and World University Games, typically at a national championship meet.

== See also ==
- United States Sports
- Pro Footvolley Tour
- Ginga Scout
