= Chris Antonopoulos (soccer) =

American soccer player (1968–2025)

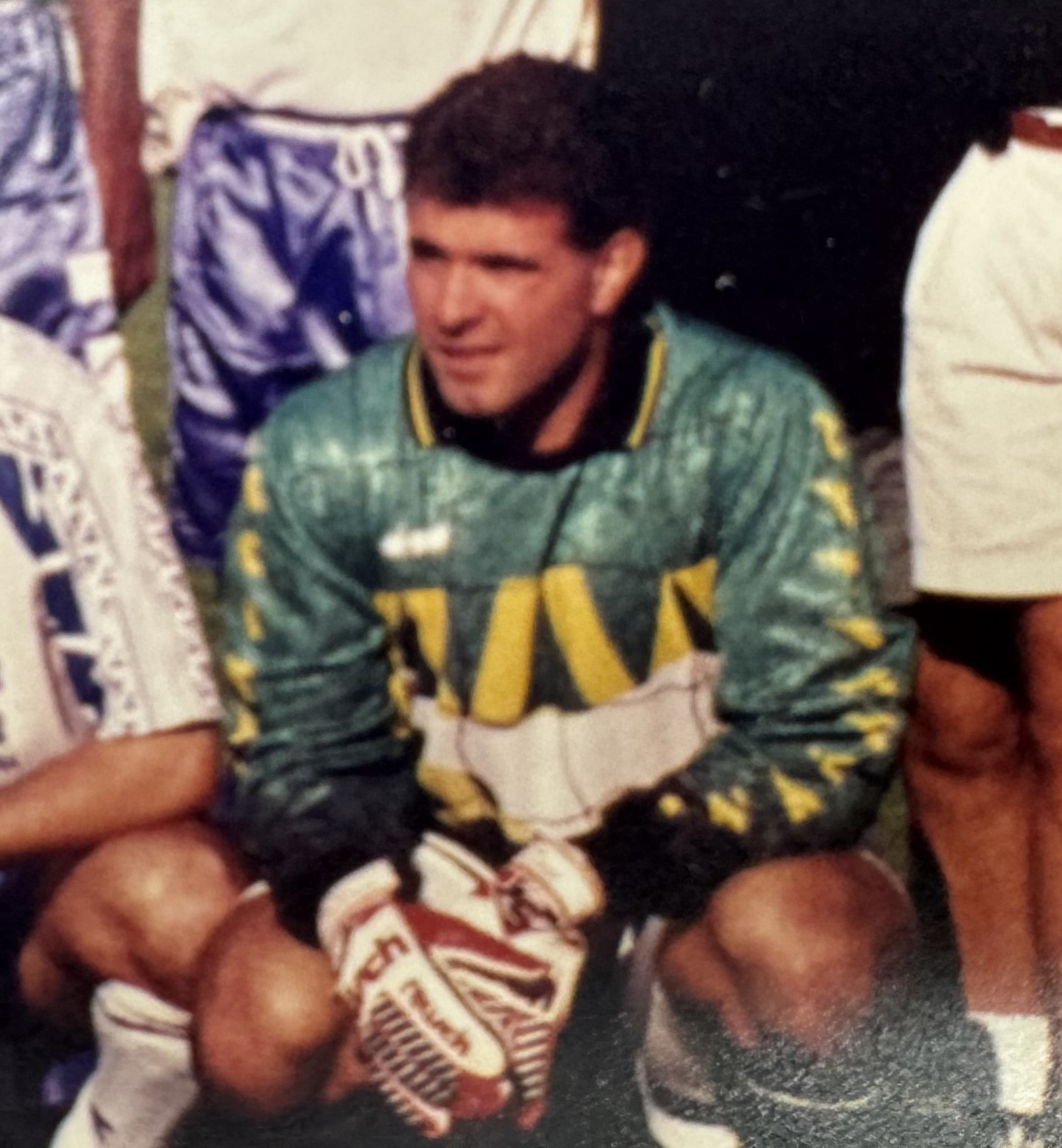
- Antonopoulos in the 1990s

Personal information
- Full name: Chris Charles Antonopoulos
- Date of birth: December 17, 1968
- Place of birth: Alexandria, Louisiana, United States
- Date of death: January 27, 2025 (aged 56)
- Place of death: Miami, Florida, United States
- Height: 5 ft 9 in (1.75 m)
- Position: Goalkeeper

Youth career
- 1975–1979: Miami Shores
- 1979–1982: F.C. Bayern (indoor)
- 1982–1986: Archbishop Curley High School

College career
Years	Team	Apps	(Gls)
1987-1990	FIU Panthers	44	(0)

Senior career*
Years	Team	Apps	(Gls)
1990	Holywood Kickers		
1993	Fort Lauderdale Strikers	2	(0)
1994	Florida Stars	17	(0)
1990s	Miami Socker Locker		
2005–2006	Team Rio	7	(0)
2010–2011	Florida Beach Soccer FC	12	(0)

International career
1984	United States U-16 (AAU)	6	(0)
2002–2006	United States (beach)		

Managerial career
- 1991–1993: Miami Curley High School
- 2005–2006: United States (beach, assistant)
- 2011–2013: Florida Beach Soccer FC
Medal record
Men's Soccer
Representing United States
1984 Junior Olympics
Gold medal – first place	1984	1st
Men's Beach Soccer
Representing United States
CONCACAF Beach Soccer Championship
Bronze medal – third place	2005	3rd
Gold medal – first place	2006	1st
- * Club domestic league appearances and goals

Chris C. Antonopoulos (December 17, 1968 – January 27, 2025) was an American soccer goalkeeper and coach. He played collegiate soccer for Florida International University, spent one season with the Fort Lauderdale Strikers in the American Professional Soccer League, played for the Florida Stars of the United States Interregional Soccer League, and later represented the United States national beach soccer team. He coached at high-school and national levels and served as head coach of Florida Beach Soccer FC.

== Early life and youth career ==
Chris Antonopoulos was born on December 17, 1968, in Alexandria, Louisiana, and raised in Miami, Florida.

He began playing outdoor soccer at age six at the Miami Shores Community Center. At age 11, Antonopoulos joined an indoor soccer league at the Miami Beach Youth Center, where he tended goal for F.C. Bayern. Despite being only 4 feet 10 inches tall and the youngest player in the league, he competed against opponents aged up to 16–18.

League coordinator Richard Williams, described Antonopoulos as the second-best goalkeeper in the league despite his team's weaker defense. Williams noted that Antonopoulos had never played indoor soccer before but quickly improved.

=== High school ===
He attended Archbishop Curley-Notre Dame High School from 1982 to 1986, where he was the starting goalkeeper.

During his sophomore year in 1984, Antonopoulos helped Curley High School in goal reach the Florida Class 3A state championship game, where they finished as runners-up after losing 2–3 to Tarpon Springs. In 1985, his junior year, Antonopoulos made 15 saves in a 1–0 shutout victory over Country Day in the District 15 AAA-AA-A title game. The team advanced beyond the district level but was eliminated in the sectional playoffs, losing 1–3 to South Plantation.

In his senior year in 1986, he recorded 14 shutouts in 19 games, he led the team in goal to the Florida Class 3A playoffs by winning their district championship. The team advanced to the sectional playoffs, defeating Ransom-Everglades in the semifinal before falling to St. Thomas Aquinas in the Section 4 championship game.

Antonopoulos earned multiple honors in his senior year, including Miami News High School Player of the Year, selection to the Florida Super Select 11 squad, the Florida Athletic Coaches Association (FACA) All-State Team, Miami Herald Dade County Player of the Year, played in the Dade-Broward All-Star Game, and received two All-Dade team selections in 1985 and 1986.

Coach Karl Kremser regarded Antonopoulos as among the top high school goalkeepers in the nation at the time. He was recruited by 20 colleges (including American University, South Florida, and Old Dominion) but chose FIU where he received a full scholarship.

=== Youth national team ===
In 1984, during his sophomore year at Curley, Antonopoulos was chosen as the goalkeeper for the United States boys under-16 soccer team at the AAU Junior Olympic Games in Jacksonville, Florida, where he played alongside his Curley teammates Kieran Clarke and Alfred Avila. He helped the Florida Gold team win the gold medal in a shutout 2–0 championship victory.

== Playing career ==
=== College ===
FIU Panthers

Antonopoulos continued at Florida International University (FIU) as the goalkeeper from 1987 to 1990 (he tore ligaments in his knee on May 25, 1986, the day after graduating from high school and was redshirted during his freshman year at FIU in 1986). He appeared in 44 matches with 36 starts in goal during his 4 years there. He recorded 134 career saves, ranking 5th on FIU's all-time career saves leaderboard. His season-high of 79 saves came in 1990. Antonopoulos' career total remains among the top 10 in program history.

During his time at FIU, in 1989 he was named Defensive MVP of the Viderson Vital Benefit Tournament, after helping lead FIU to a 2–1 victory in the championship match.

He received a B.A. in Hospitality Management in 1990.

=== Club ===
Hollywood Kickers

After college, Antonopoulos was a goalkeeper with the Hollywood Kickers a Division 1 team in the Gold Coast Soccer League (GCSL) during the early 1990s. In 1990, he served as goalkeeper for the Kickers during their playoff run in the Florida State Soccer Association's Men's Amateur State Cup at Dowdy Field, reaching the semifinals.

Miami Soccer Locker

Antonopoulos played for Miami Soccer Locker in the Dade County League during the late 1980s and the 1990s. The team competed in Division I. He participated in the Copa Latina '96, an amateur competition sanctioned by the United States Soccer Federation. The team, coached by Bobby Pinto, secured third place after losing to IBC Courier in the semifinals and defeating Olimpia in the third-place match.

=== Professional ===
Fort Lauderdale Strikers

In 1993, he turned professional with the Fort Lauderdale Strikers in the American Professional Soccer League (APSL), signing a one-year deal. Antonopoulos made his professional debut on June 18, 1993, against the Montreal Impact at Lockhart Stadium, playing in relief and conceding one goal in a 2–1 loss. He earned his only start on August 29, 1993, against the Tampa Bay Rowdies, allowing six goals in a 6–2 defeat. Across these two appearances, he played a total of 141 minutes and conceded seven goals.

Florida Stars

In 1994, Antonopoulos played as the goalkeeper for the North Miami-based Florida Stars of the United States Interregional Soccer League (USISL), competing in the league's Southeast Division. He appeared in all 17 regular-season matches, leading the team to an 11–6 record while conceding 39 goals. The Stars finished third in the division with 97 points. Following league restructuring at the end of the 1994 outdoor season, the Florida Stars franchise folded.

=== Beach soccer ===
Team RIO

Antonopoulos served as the goalkeeper for Team Rio, which won the North American Sand Soccer Championships (NASSC) in 2005.

Florida Beach Soccer FC

In 2010, Antonopoulos co-founded Florida Beach Soccer FC, a Florida-based beach soccer team formed with several members of the U.S. beach soccer program. He served as its general manager. During the team's inaugural period, Antonopoulos served as its goalkeeper under coach Roberto Ceciliano before moving fully into coaching the team due to injuries.

The team finished third at the U.S. Open at the North American Sand Soccer Championships in 2010. That same year, the team saw victory at the Major Beach Soccer National Championship held in Clearwater Beach, Florida.

== International career ==
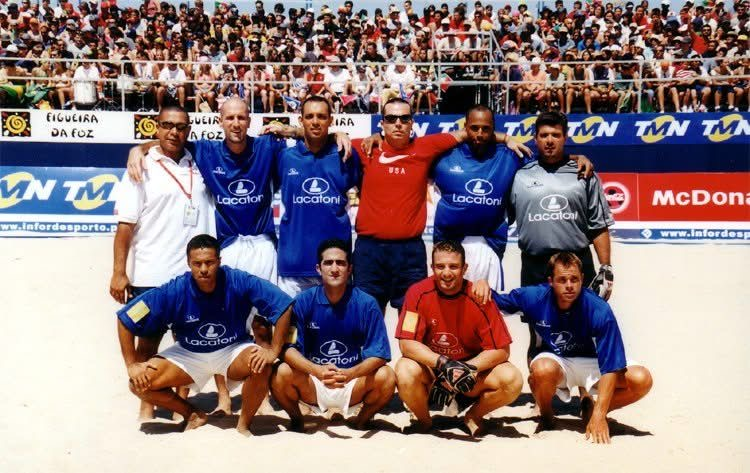
Antonopoulos is pictured (top-right) with the United States men's National Beach Soccer Team in Figueira da Foz, Portugal.

From 2002 to 2006, Antonopoulos represented the United States Men's National Beach Soccer Team as a goalkeeper and an assistant coach. He participated in multiple international tournaments during his tenure, including appearances at the Mundialito de Futebol de Praia in Portugal.

In 2005, he contributed to the team's third-place finish at the inaugural CONCACAF and CONMEBOL Beach Soccer Championship held in Rio de Janeiro, Brazil, where the United States defeated Argentina in the bronze medal match; this result qualified the U.S. as the top North American team for the 2005 FIFA Beach Soccer World Cup in Brazil.

The team received gold in 2006 CONCACAF Beach Soccer Championship in Puntarenas, Costa Rica defeating Canada in the final to claim their first-ever CONCACAF title, earning qualification for the 2006 FIFA Beach Soccer World Cup.

== Coaching career ==
=== High school ===
After his playing career at FIU, Antonopoulos served as the head coach of the boys' varsity soccer team at Archbishop Curley Notre Dame High School in Miami, Florida, his alma mater. In 1992, during his tenure, the team qualified for the FHSAA Class 2A regional playoffs but was eliminated in the regional round with a 1–2 overtime loss to Gulliver Prep. The following year, 1993, the team compiled a 14–7–1 record and qualified for the district playoffs, with two players, including his younger brother Todd Antonopoulos, selected to the Class 3A–2A–1A First Team All-State.

=== National team ===
Antonopoulos' coaching experience also includes serving as an assistant coach for the United States Men's National Beach Soccer Team in 2005 and 2006. In this role, he contributed to the team's victory at the with third place at the 2005 and first place at the 2006 CONCACAF Beach Soccer Championship, earning their first title and securing qualification for the 2005 and 2006 FIFA Beach Soccer World Cup.

=== Florida Beach Soccer FC ===
After sustaining knee and shoulder injuries, Antonopoulos became head coach of Florida Beach Soccer FC in 2011.

In 2011, Florida Beach Soccer FC won the North American Sand Soccer Championship (NASSC) U.S. Open, the BagoSports Beach Football Invitational in Trinidad and Tobago (with a 5–3 win over Stokely Vale FC in the final), and the Major Beach Soccer National Championship at Clearwater Beach (1–0 over Team Spartan). The team also participated in the Beach Soccer Championships in Oceanside, California, finishing third in the Pro Bracket with a group-stage win over eventual champions San Diego Sockers (4–3), a semi-final loss to the US Beach Soccer National Team (4–6), and a consolation victory over Nacional da Madeira (10–3). Under his management, the team reached its competitive peak during the 2011 season, finishing with a 28–2–1 record. The team won the NASSC U.S. Open again in 2012 (with a 3–2 win over Deerfield Beach FC). In 2013, they reached the NASSC final but lost 2–3 to HRSC Elite.

== Personal life and legacy ==
After retiring from professional soccer, Antonopoulos returned to his passion for the sport by coaching youth soccer through various organizations.

Antonopoulos was known to friends by the nickname "AntMan".

Antonopoulos married his wife, Michele Antonopoulos, in November 1998 in Las Vegas, Nevada. The couple later resided in Palm Beach, Florida, where they raised their four children: Brandon, Jacob, Ryan, and Tiffany.

Chris passed away in Miami, Florida in January 2025.

In a statement on his death, Francis Farberoff, a former teammate from the U.S. National Men's Beach Soccer Team and later coach of both the U.S. and Bahama's Men's National Teams, commented on Antonopoulos's contributions to the sport. Farberoff noted that Antonopoulos was a committed presence during their time together, emphasizing his intensity in matches and training, as well as his role in motivating teammates. He described their shared experiences as memorable, highlighting Antonopoulos's lasting impression on those he played with.

The NASSC referred to him as one of beach soccer's “OGs,” acknowledging his early contributions to its growth in the United States.

== Honors ==
=== As player ===
Archbishop Curley High School

- Florida Class 3A: District champions, sectional champions and state championship runners-up (1984)
- Florida Class 3A: District champions (1985)
- Florida Class 3A: District champions and Section 4 championship runners-up (1986)

Youth national team

- AAU Junior Olympic Games 1984 (gold)

Miami Soccer Locker

- Copa Latina (Miami): 1996 (3rd)

Team Rio

- NASSC U.S. Open: 2005

Florida Beach Soccer FC

- NASSC U.S. Open: 2010 (3rd)
- Major Beach Soccer National Championship (Clearwater): 2010

National team (beach soccer)

- CONCACAF Beach Soccer Championship: 2005 (bronze), 2006 (gold)

Individual

- Miami Herald Dade County Player of the Year (1986)
- Miami News High School Player of the Year (1986)
- Florida Super Select 11 (1986)
- Florida Athletic Coaches Association (FACA) All-State Team (1986)
- All-Dade selections (1985, 1986)
- Dade-Broward All-Star Game (1986)
- Defensive MVP, Viderson Vital Benefit Tournament (1989, FIU)

Records

- FIU Panthers all-time career saves: Top 5 (134 saves, 1987–1990)

=== As coach ===
Florida Beach Soccer FC

- NASSC U.S. Open: 2011, 2012, 2013 (finalist)
- BagoSports Beach Football Invitational: 2011
- Major Beach Soccer National Championship (Clearwater): 2011
- Beach Soccer Championships (Oceanside): 2011 (3rd)
