= USL Breakaways =

- Genre: Sports
- Starring: Gerry Fall
- Country of origin: United States

Original release
- Network: Fox Soccer Channel
- Release: January 1, 2006 – present

USL Breakaways is a sports television series hosted by Gerry Fall airing on the Fox Soccer Channel and sponsored by the United Soccer League (USL).
