= Beach Soccer Championships (Oceanside) =

Annual beach soccer tournament in Oceanside, California

- Current season, competition or edition: 2025 Beach Soccer Championships
- Sport: Beach soccer
- Founded: 2007
- Founder: Frank Zimmerman
- First season: 2007
- Organising body: LIFEthruSOCCER
- No. of teams: ~300 (youth, amateur, professional)
- Country: United States
- Venues: Harbor Beach, Oceanside, California
- Continent: North America
- Most recent champion: Men: Maryzillians Women: Dena Beach SC (2025)
- Sponsor: Frontwave Credit Union
- Related competitions: US Pro Cup
- Tournament format: Group stage and knockout round, FIFA beach soccer rules
- Website: www.beachsoccerusa.org
- 2025 Beach Soccer Championships

The Beach Soccer Championships, also known as BeSoCha, is an annual beach soccer tournament held at Harbor Beach in Oceanside, California. Founded in 2007 by Oceanside native Frank Zimmerman, the event is one of the largest beach soccer festivals in the United States, hosting approximately 300 teams across 28 sand courts. It features youth (U8–U19), adult amateur, and professional divisions for men, women, and co-ed teams, attracting participants from the United States, Mexico, and countries such as Brazil, Spain, Italy, Japan, and the United Arab Emirates. The tournament, which includes the US Pro Cup for professional teams, is televised in over 170 countries, contributing to beach soccer’s growth as a professional sport.

The event draws over 10,000 participants and 50,000 attendees annually, offering a festival atmosphere with vendors, music, and the Frontwave BeSoCha Cantina for food and entertainment. The Beach Soccer Championships is recognized for its role in promoting beach soccer in North America.

== History ==
The Beach Soccer Championships was established in 2007 by Frank Zimmerman, a Southern California soccer coach, with the goal of promoting beach soccer in the United States. The inaugural event hosted 152 teams on 15 sand courts at Harbor Beach and was won by Team 99. By 2010, the tournament expanded to its current capacity of 28 courts, accommodating approximately 300 teams annually.

The tournament was not held in 2020 and 2021 due to the COVID-19 pandemic. It resumed in 2022.

== Format ==
The Beach Soccer Championships operates under FIFA beach soccer rules.

The tournament includes:

- Youth Divisions: U8–U19, open to boys and girls.
- Adult Amateur Divisions: Men, women, and co-ed teams.
- Professional Divisions: Men’s and women’s teams, competing in the US Pro Cup.

== USA pro cup ==
The USA Pro Cup is the professional division of the Beach Soccer Championships, featuring men’s and women’s teams from the United States and abroad. It follows FIFA beach soccer rules and includes a group stage and knockout rounds.

Past participants have included prominent teams such as FC Barcelona, Vasco da Gama, Florida Beach Soccer FC, US Beach Soccer NT and CD Nacional.

In 2022, the US Pro Cup added a women’s professional bracket for the first time.

=== Men's ===
Year	Men's US Pro Cup Champions (2007-2025)
2025	Maryzillians
2024	GoBeachSoccer
2023	SoCal Legacy
2022	GoBeachSoccer
2021	No tournament
2020	No tournament (Covid-19)
2019	Lazio (Italy)
2018	GoBeachSoccer
2017	Fortaleza (Brazil)
2016	Al Ahli (UAE, Dubai)
2015	BSC Chargers (Switzerland)
2014	CD Nacional (Portugal)
2013	CD Nacional (Portugal)
2012	CD Nacional (Portugal)
2011	San Diego Sockers
2010	SoCal Beach FC
2009	Team Senegal
2008	Palms Las Vegas
2007	Team 99

=== Women's ===
Year	Women's U.S. Pro Cup Champions (2022–2025)
2025	Dena Beach SC
2024	Cali BSC
2023	Riptide
2022	LA Beach Soccer
