= Guatemala national beach soccer team =

Guatemala
- Association: Federación Nacional de Fútbol de Guatemala
- Confederation: CONCACAF (Central America)
- Head coach: Raul Aldana
- FIFA code: GUA
- BSWW ranking: 21 ▼1 (1 June 2026)
First colours
Second colours

CONCACAF Beach Soccer Championship
- Appearances: 5 (first in 2011)
- Best result: Second Place (2025)

The Guatemala national beach soccer team represents Guatemala in international beach soccer competitions and is controlled by FENAFUTG, the governing body for football in Guatemala.

== Current squad ==
Correct as of November 2010

Note: Flags indicate national team as defined under FIFA eligibility rules; some limited exceptions apply. Players may hold more than one non-FIFA nationality.

No.	Pos.	Nation	Player
1	GK		Gerson Alas
2	DF		Flavio García
3	DF		Luis García
4	DF		Ángel Sáenz
5	FW		Esau Polanco
6	FW		Miguel Gonzalez

No.	Pos.	Nation	Player
7	FW		Juan Alvarado
8	FW		Fermin Avila
9	FW		Alex Moran
10	FW		Marco Ávila
11	FW		Frankie Ramírez
12	GK		Ever Pineda

Coach: Raul Aldana

== Achievements ==
- CONCACAF Beach Soccer Championship Best: 2nd Place
  - 2025
