= Pro Footvolley Tour =

Beach sports competition

- Full name: Pro Footvolley Tour
- Region: USA
- Date span: November–August
- Tournaments: Men & Women; Men; Women
- Type: Footvolley

History
- First event: 2008
- Number of events: 35 (2015)

The Pro Footvolley Tour is the preeminent touring series of professional footvolley in the Americas and the exclusive rights holder to Team USA.

== History ==
The Pro Footvolley Tour has started in 2008, with the first event held on Hollywood Beach, FL. In that event, former FIFA World Cup winner and Brazilian star Romário won the competition playing alongside his partner Joao Luis. The first event was sanctioned under the United States Footvolley Association (the sport's governing body within the United States).

The Pro Footvolley Tour's initial event drew close to 5,000 spectators. The excitement led to a bigger and broader sponsorship package from both the host City of Hollywood and Bud Light for 2009. The following year, the tournament was held under a larger festival which also had a music concert. This event had international teams from France, Italy, Portugal, Brazil, and the United States. Brazilian squad became champions after beating a Portuguese team, led by Alan Cavalcanti. That success prompted organizers to create Pro Footvolley Tour's 1st World Cup, in 2010. In 2011, Bud Light Lime stepped in as a national sponsor and the 'National Tour' was born. Over the next few years, more fans got to see the Pro Footvolley Tour as it went from simply a South Florida event to one with stops on both Coasts. In 2012, the Tour debuted on GOLTV. In 2013, the Tour partnered with Regional Sports Networks across the country. The exclusive relationships with RSN's brought the Tour into nearly all major markets in America, often with excellent time slots pre/post MLS Soccer Matches or MLB games, and with an enviable frequency of airings.

== Competition formula ==
The Pro Footvolley Tour altered some of the sport's traditional rules to make it more appealing to an American audience that covets faster and more aggressive sports. The signature play in footvolley is the over-the-head frontal foot spike often referred to as the 'Shark Attack'. This play is considered by organisers as risky as the athletes preferred to try it only when matches were sort of decided already or if that was the only option left for an attacking player to attempt. The competition committee thus enacted a new 'super point', making a successful shark attack two points versus just one. At first, players complained, but within a short period of time the sport noticeably became more athletic and more exciting. Teams are permitted three super points per set max, but may execute as many as they want to within a match. 'Shark Attacks' completed after the three successful ones count then as only one point.

Another aspect of the game that changed was the lowering of the height of the net to 6'8" and size of the court to 29'.5" x 58'. The rallies shorted a bit, but the action became faster with power becoming increasingly more important on offensive.

Tournaments generally begin with 16 or 12 teams with group play followed by straight elimination at the quarter-finals stage.

== Appearance ==
United States men's national footvolley team and Brazil men's national footvolley team are the only teams that participated in all editions of the Pro Footvolley Tour.

== Celebrities ==
Footvolley has become a favorite side sport for some of soccer's biggest celebrities. Pro Footvolley Tour hosted an event for Soccer Without Limits 'SWOL' in which top international stars such as Jérôme Boateng, Oguchi Onyewu, amongst others competed in an attempt to raise awareness against racism in football.

== Media ==
=== Television coverage ===
Pro Footvolley Tour airs on Root Sports, Comcast SportsNet, Time Warner SportsChannel, Bright House Networks, WapaDeportes, and CaribVision and beIN Sports. DirecTV Pro Footvolley Tour can be seen in the entire United States and Puerto Rico.

==== United States ====
Since 2008 Pro Footvolley has been broadcast nationwide on television in the USA.
