= San Luis La Herradura =

- District

- Location in El Salvador
- Coordinates: 13°39′N 88°56′W
- Country: El Salvador
- Department: La Paz
- Elevation: 148 ft (45 m)

Population (2024)
  - District: 20,542
  - Estimate (2026): 21,437
  - Rank: 70th in El Salvador
  - Urban: 9,034
  - Rural: 11,508

San Luis La Herradura is a municipality in the La Paz Department, El Salvador.
