= Footvolley =

Brazilian sport played with a football

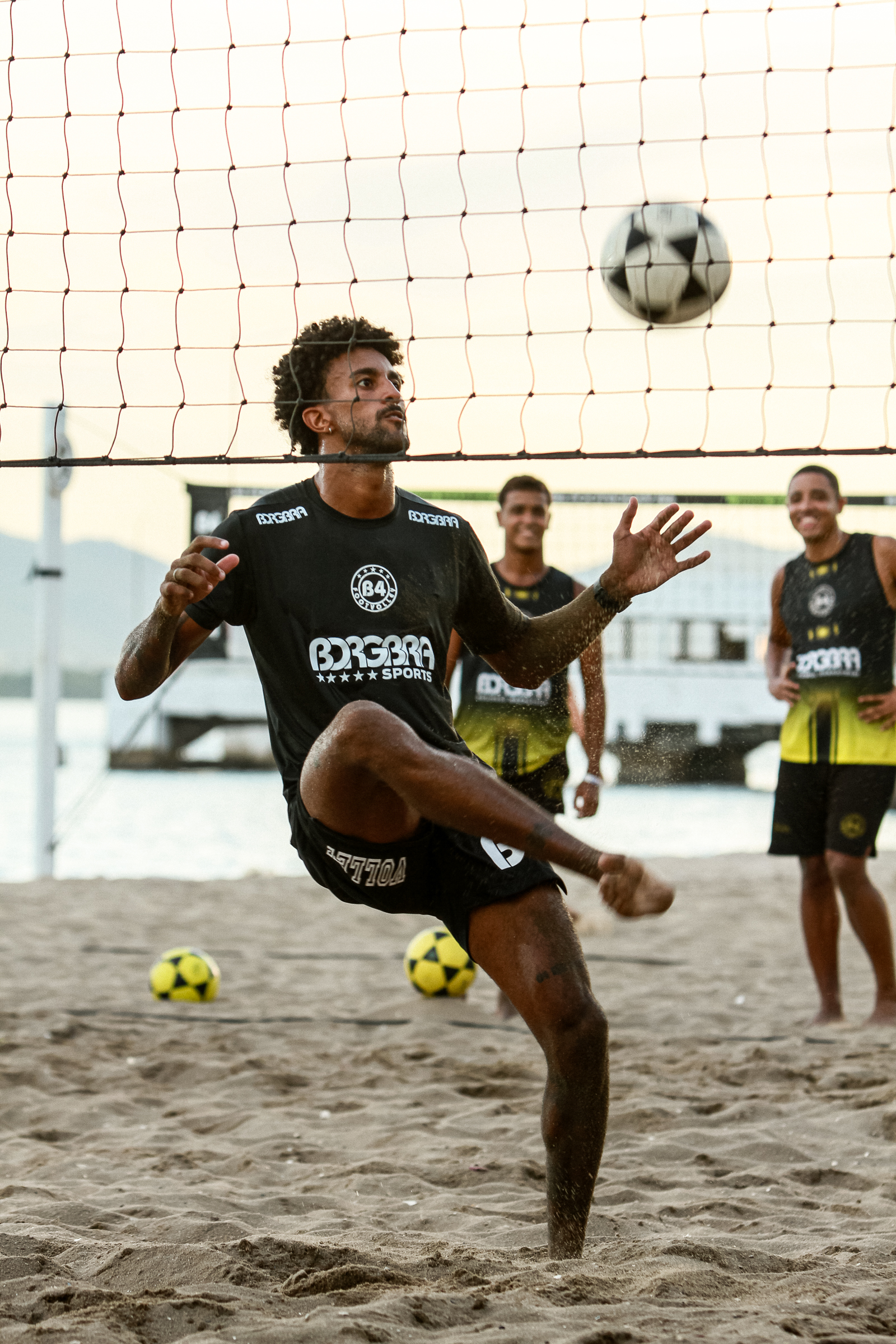
Footvolley player kicking a ball with the inner side of the foot

Footvolley (Portuguese: Futevôlei [futʃiˈvolej] in Brazil, Futevólei [ˌfutɨˈvɔlɐj] in Portugal) (first known as pevoley) is a sport which combines aspects of beach volleyball, tennis, and association football. The sport is similar to kick volleyball and futnet.

Footvolley was created by Octavio de Moraes in 1965 in Rio de Janeiro. Footvolley combines field rules which are based beach volleyball rules with ball-touch rules taken from association football. Essentially footvolley is beach volleyball except players are not allowed to use their hands and a football replaces the volleyball.

== World Federation ==
There is no official world championship or official world federation in footvolley. Here are registered active leagues.

1. World Footvolley - worldfootvolley.com (since 2016)
2. Thefootvolley.com - thefootvolley.com/
3. International Footvolley Federation
4. Federation International of Footvolley - FIFV
5. World Footvolley Federation (FWW) (@the_footvolley) - thefootvolley.com/our-members.html (since 2016/2022)
6. European Footvolley League - footvolleyeurope.com The European Footvolley League (EFVL)
7. Asian Footvolley Federation (AFF) - ocasia.org/sports/federations/107-asian-footvolley-federation.html
8. South Asia Footvolley Federation (SAFVF) - footvolleytechnical.gmail.com
9. Azərbaycan Futnet Federasiyası - futnet.az
10. Kenya Footvolley League - kenyafootvolley.org
11. African Footvolley League

== History ==
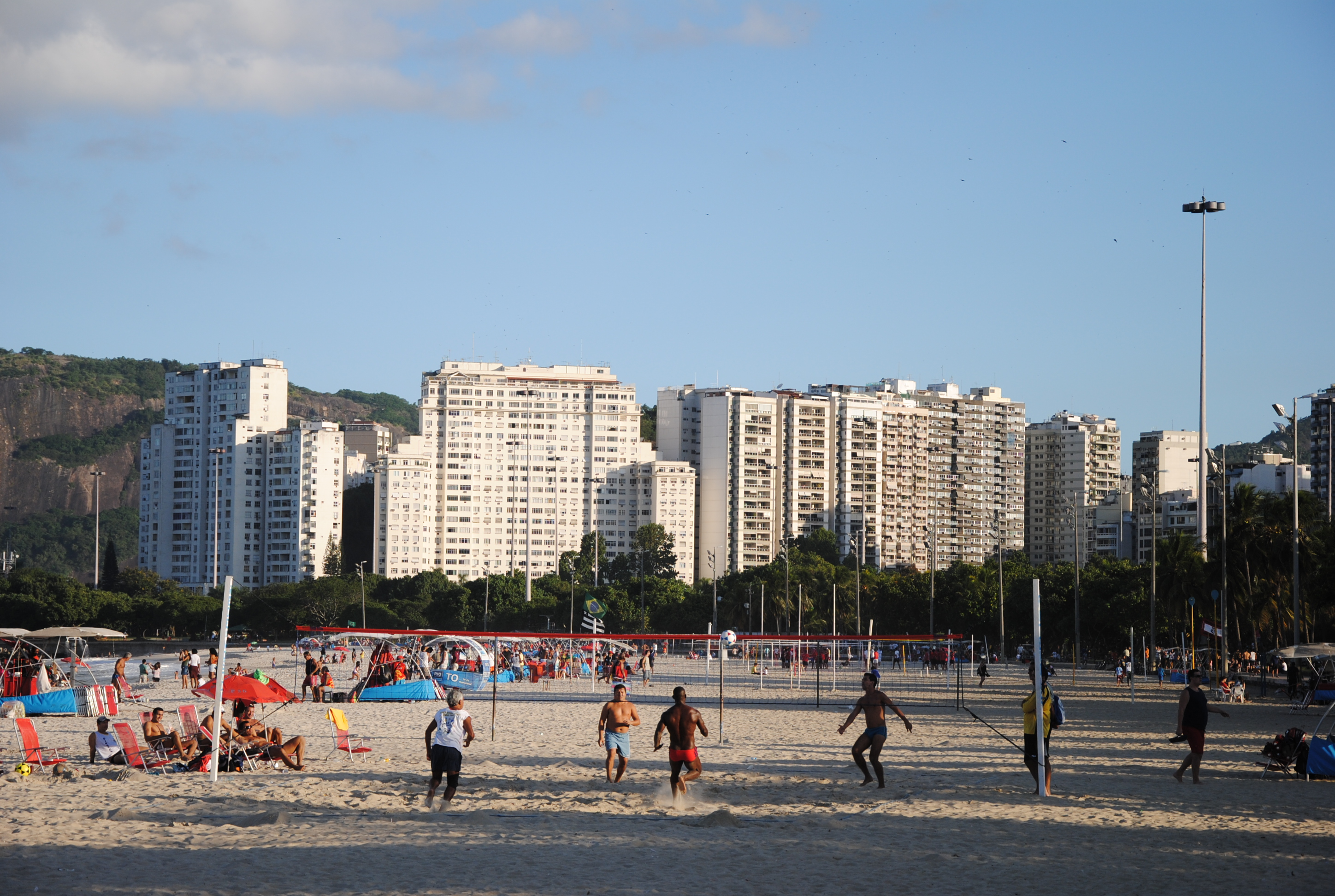
Footvolley in Rio de Janeiro

Footvolley was created by Octavio de Moraes in 1965 on Rio de Janeiro's Copacabana Beach. The game of footvolley was first called 'pévolei' (from pé=foot and vôlei=volley), but the name was discarded in favor of "futevôlei" (cf. Portuguese futebol, "association football"). Footvolley began in Rio de Janeiro, according to a player because football was banned on the beach, but volleyball courts were open. By the 1970s, the sport had spread to Recife, Salvador, Brasília, Goiânia, Santos, and Florianópolis.

Teams of footvolley had five players a side at first. Due to the skill level of the footvolley athletes (nearly all were professional football players), the ball would rarely drop. The players began lowering the number of players on each side, eventually settling on 2 versus 2, which is still in use today. In recent years, professional football players have taken up footvolley in both promotional events and celebrity matches. Some notable Brazilian footballers who have played (or still play) footvolley are Romário, Edmundo, Ronaldo, Ronaldinho Gaúcho, Léo Júnior, Renato Gaúcho, and Edinho (1982 and 1986 National Team).

The first International Footvolley event to occur outside of Brazil was in 2003 by the United States Footvolley Association in Miami Beach at the 2003 Fitness Festival. The event led to international players and teams in pursuit of federation status. A tournament was held during the 2016 Summer Olympics in Rio de Janeiro, as a demonstration sport.

== Ball ==
An indoor footvolley ball looks like a basketball, but at only 360g it is smaller, bouncier, and heavier than a volleyball.

== Rules ==
Footvolley combines field rules which are based on those of beach volleyball with ball-touch rules taken from association football. Essentially footvolley is beach volleyball except players are not allowed to use their hands and a football replaces the volleyball.

The field is 4x4 meters long. Points are awarded if the ball hits the ground in the opponent's court, if the opponents commit a fault, or if they fail to return the ball over the net. Scoring is done using the rally point system, according to volleyball rules. Match scoring is usually up to the event organizer's discretion. In general, matches are one set to 18 points, or best of three sets to 15 points (with the third set to 11 points). The court is 9 m x 18 m (the same as a beach volleyball court before 2001). The height of the net varies based on the competition. The official international rule for the net height set is 2.2 metres (7 ft 3 in) for the men's competition. For the women's competition, the height of the net should be set at 2 metres (6 ft 7 in).

== International growth ==
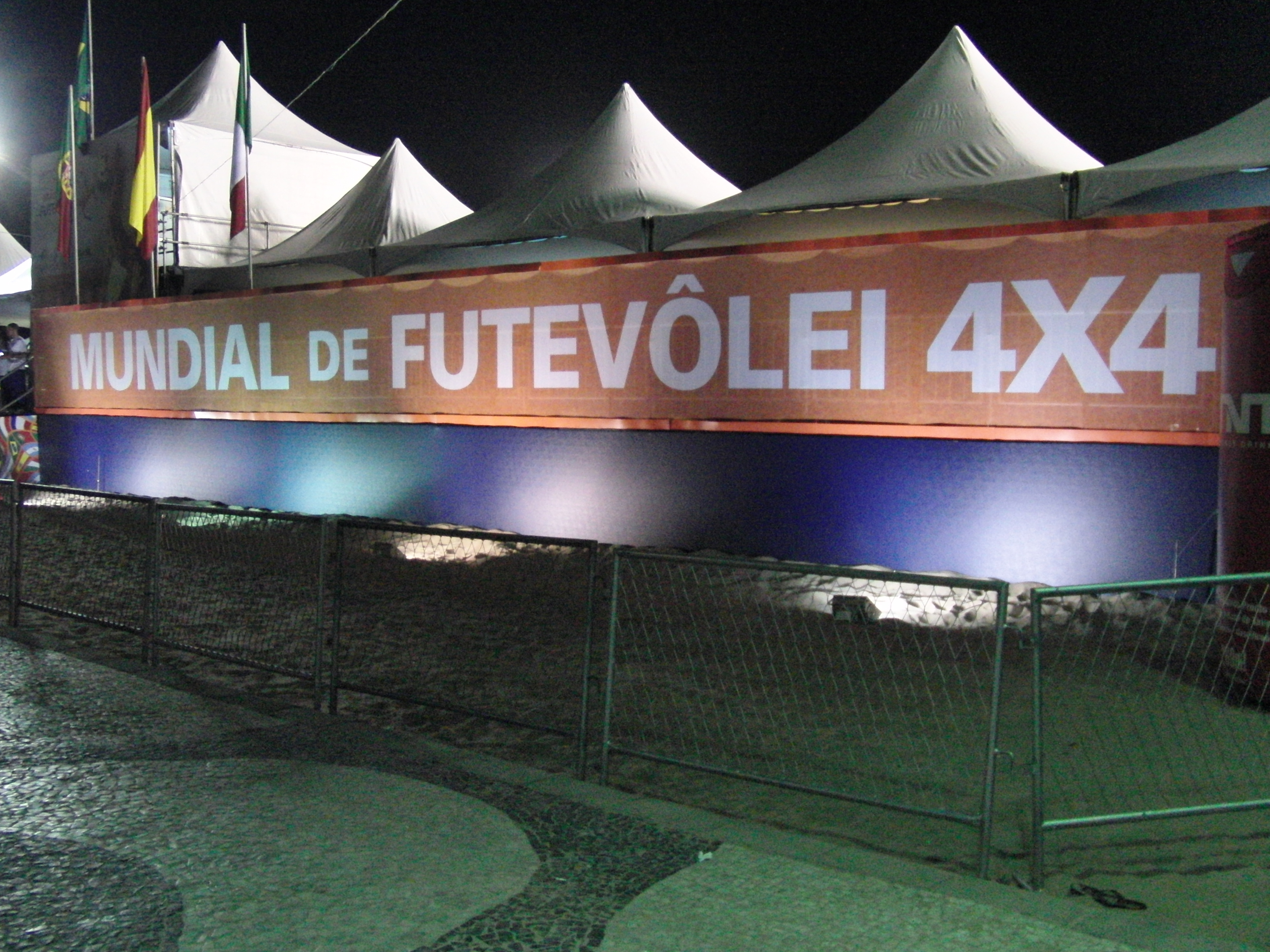
Footvolley World Cup-Mundial de Futevôlei, Rio de Janeiro

Since the sport's inception in Brazil, footvolley has spread and gained popularity internationally, including in the Americas, Europe, Africa, the Middle East, Asia, and Oceania.

Major events have been held at many beach cities in countries around the world including Spain, Portugal, Israel, Greece, United Arab Emirates, France, the Netherlands, Aruba, Thailand, South Africa, Paraguay, Brazil, Argentina, and Iran.

=== Paraguay ===
Paraguay was the first world champion of footvolley. Jesús, a Paraguayan, is considered the best player in the World Championship.

=== Brazil ===
Brasília (the capital of Brazil) has produced Eduardo Papel, Gabriel, Xeleleu, Jansen de Oliveira, Ramiro, Betola, Edinho, Hugão, and Luisinho who play footvolley. They taught other popular young players including Belo, Marcelinho, Mário, Café, Diego and Lana (in female and unisex footvolley). The first group of nine players also taught other players like Renato and Felipe.

=== United Kingdom ===
In April 1997, the England team accompanied football legends John Barnes and Niall Quinn to a tournament in Pattaya, Thailand organized by the Thai Footvolley Federation. England held two events in 2007, the Muller Rice Cake Open in Croyde and the Lamisil Once Footvolley Open in Brighton. Dirceu and Luigi were champions at both events, maintaining their unbeaten record and David and Gary, the England footvolley team pair, won the Shield Competition.

=== Israel ===
Corona FootVolley League, the only ordinary footvolley league in the world, is played since 2008 every summer starting in May/June until the final four in September/October with 12 teams and 11 league rounds in the Premier league and 12 teams playing 11 rounds in the Masters league. In 2009 Corona FootVolley European Tour was established by inviting teams from Europe to play in Israel. In 2011 Corona FootVolley European Tour was upgraded to Corona FootVolley World Tour inviting teams from all over the world to play.

Corona FootVolley Winter Cup, a two-day tournament, has been played in Israel every February since 2010. Since 2016 the IFA (Israel Footvolley Association) started to arrange footvolley all over the country, including "Israel Footvolley League" and the local ranking event under the partnership with the European Footvolley League (EFVL).

=== Italy ===
The first Footvolley Italia Tour was in 2008 when a group of friends from Ravenna organized the event. Normally the tour is in the months of June, July, and August and four to five tournaments compose the tour. In Italy the international rules are used: court 9mx9m and the net 2,20m.

=== Australia ===
Footvolley Australia (FVA) is the first peak body responsible for footvolley in Australia. FVA was founded in 2007 in the Northern Beaches of Sydney. The organization was formed to establish, guide, and promote footvolley in Australia. The FVA is working on the development of the practice of footvolley by organizing Footvolley Experience sessions for newcomers to the sport, footvolley education, and coaching across Australia, the National Footvolley Tour, and participation in international competitions. Footvolley Australia is working with relevant international associations, especially in the Asia and Oceania regions to promote the growth of the game.

=== United States ===
In the United States, footvolley began in South Florida. Local promoters organized the 2002 Impulse Energy Drink South Beach Footvolley Tournament which was won by Adrian Boente. In 2005, the United States Footvolley Association was created in Miami Beach. Every year since 2005 a national championship has been held. The first national championship was held on December 11, 2005. The winning side was Franco Cappuotti (Hollywood, Florida and Claudio Rodriguez (Orlando). The runners-up were Adriano Boente and Alberto 'Betto' Lima. In December 2006, the second national championship took place which was won by Brenno Souza (Miami) with Paulo Ricardo (Deerfield Beach, Florida ).

The third national championships occurred in September 2007 on Hollywood Beach. Adriano Boente (Deerfield Beach) and Junior Pereira (Boca Raton) were crowned national champions. The fourth U.S. Footvolley National Championships happened in August 2008 on Miami Beach with Miguel Habib and Eduardo Fiuza beating Adrian Boente and Junior Pereira in the final. The 2009 National Championships were held on Miami Beach in December. The winners were Adrian Boente and Felipe Tolomelli (Deerfield Beach) who beat Renato Teixeira (Coconut Creek) and Ricardo Cardoso (Boca Raton). In 2010, the national champions were Sergio Menezes (Miami Beach) and Igor Martins (Doral) who beat Lucas Roque (Deerfield Beach) and Karl Meneghisso (Riviera Beach).

For the 2011 and 2012 National Championships, points taken from the Pro Footvolley Tour circuit were used to determine the winners. In 2011 and 2012, Lucas Roque and Meneghisso were national champions finishing the Tour with the highest point totals. In 2013, the National Championship was determined from the Hollywood Beach Open. The winners were Fernando Plentz (Miami) and Adriano Boente (Deerfield Beach). The 2014 U.S. Footvolley National Championships were held in December in Miami Beach. The winners for 2014 were Menezes and Wellington Oliveira winning in Miami Beach.

The 2015 US Footvolley National Championships were held in October 2015 in Miami Beach. The winners were Oscar Calvancanti (Miami) with Carlos Valadares (Boca Raton). In 2016, the US Footvolley National Championships were held in December in Miami Beach, with the winning side of Antonio DiMasio (Miami Beach) and Alberto Lima (Miami) beating Menezes and Oscar Calvacante (Miami Beach). The 2017 U.S. Footvolley National Championships were held on December 3, 2017. Menezes and Leonardo Lasmar (Miami) beat Bruno Baiao (Surfside) and Candido de Souza (Kendall). The 2018 U.S. Footvolley National Championships were held on September 9 and 10, in Pompano Beach. Meneghisso and Wellington Corea beat Fernando Plentz and William Lobato to win the title. With the Pro Footvolley Tour in 2019, the national champions were determined from three events held on Hollywood Beach. Luke 'The Rock' Roque and Karl Meneghisso were superior to the rest of all U.S.-based athletes in winning the three stages and becoming the 2019 national champions.

==== 2016 Olympic qualifiers ====
In 2016, the U.S. Footvolley Association held Olympic qualifiers which consisted of local and then a final national tournament. The initial tournaments were held in Sunny Isles Beach, Florida and in Huntington Beach, California. U.S. Footvolley paid for the winning teams to travel to Seaside, Oregon for the final tournament determining the best American team. Menezes and Roque (the southern Florida winners) faced Akad Kader and Alex Freire (both of Los Angeles) in the final in Seaside. Menezes and Roque won the match and represented the U.S. at the 2016 Rio Footvolley Exhibition Tournament. On the women's side, Melony Poviones, and Leah Morales had the most points from a round-robin tournament to become the women's representatives for the event.

==== 2016 Rio Tournament ====
At the 2016 RIO World Footvolley Tournament, Menezes/Roque lost to Germany in the quarterfinals in a tight match. On the women's side, Team USA Poviones/Morales beat Italy in the quarter-finals. The women lost to Holland in the semi-finals. The team placed 4th after losing to Brazil in the consolation match.

==== Pro Footvolley Tour ====
The Pro Footvolley Tour is America's professional touring series, established in March 2008. The Tour began regionally and expanded nationally in 2011. In 2011 and 2012, the Tour was sponsored by Bud Light Lime and in 2013 by Coors Light. There have been events in Santa Barbara; Virginia Beach, Virginia, Seaside Heights, New Jersey; Pompano Beach, Florida; Hollywood Beach, Florida; Lauderdale-by-the-Sea, Florida; Daytona Beach, Florida; Panama City, Florida, and Miami Beach. The Tour is the world's number one distributor of professional footvolley content broadcasting on major broadcast networks around the world. The Tour has aired over 300 hours of professional footvolley since 2013. The Tour counts ESPN, BeinSports, Spectrum Sports, Root Sports, AT&T Sports, WAPA Deportes, and Eleven Sports as broadcast partners.

==== Equipment ====
In 2015, Pro Footvolley Tour launched the world's first footvolley purpose ball. U.S. Footvolley used the ball during the 2016 U.S. Olympic qualifiers. To date, this footvolley-only specific ball is used on the Pro Footvolley Tour.

=== South Korea ===
The game is featured in 2018 Idol Star Athletics Bowling Archery Rhythmic Gymnastics Foot Volleyball Championships during Chuseok. The rules are 4 on 4, from a team of six and the third set is still at 15 points. The rules allow one bounce, unless if it touches the boundary lines or the net.

== See also ==
- Sepak takraw
