= Trinidad and Tobago national beach soccer team =

National beach soccer team representing Trinidad and Tobago

Trinidad and Tobago
- Nickname: The Soca Warriors
- Association: Trinidad and Tobago Football Association
- Confederation: CONCACAF
- Sub-confederation: CFU (Caribbean)
- Head coach: Chad Appoo
- Captain: Ryan Augustine
- Most caps: Chad Appoo
- Top scorer: Kevon Woodley
- FIFA code: TRI
- BSWW ranking: 64 ▼7 (6 May 2026)
First colours
Second colours

Biggest win
- 5-0 Canada

The Trinidad and Tobago National Beach Soccer Team represents Trinidad and Tobago in International Beach Soccer Competitions and is controlled by the Trinidad and Tobago Football Association, the governing body for football in Trinidad and Tobago. The team has competed in two CONCACAF Beach Soccer Championships. Finishing 7th in Nassau, Bahamas 2013 and 5th in Costa del Sol, El Salvador 2015. They won the Lucayan Cup in October 2015 defeating hosts Bahamas 5-3 and Mexico 5-4. They are currently ranked 50th in the world (7th in CONCACAF) according to Beach Soccer Worldwide.

== Current squad ==
Note: Flags indicate national team as defined under FIFA eligibility rules; some limited exceptions apply. Players may hold more than one non-FIFA nationality.

| No. | Pos. | Nation | Player |
|---|---|---|---|
| — | GK | | Victor Thomas |
| — | GK | | Zane Coker |
| — | DF | | Ryan Augustine |
| — | DF | | Lemuel Lyons |
| — | DF | | Jesse Bailey |
| — | DF | | Hakeem King |

| No. | Pos. | Nation | Player |
|---|---|---|---|
| — | FW | | Chad Appoo |
| — | FW | | Kerwin Stafford |
| — | FW | | David Mc Dougall |
| — | FW | | Kevon Woodley |
| — | FW | | Kareem Perry |
| — | FW | | Makan Hislop |

== Achievements ==
=== CONCACAF Beach Soccer Championship ===
| Year | Round | Pos | Pld | W | W aet/pso | L | GF | GA | GD |
|---|---|---|---|---|---|---|---|---|---|
| Puntarenas, Costa Rica. 2006 | Did not enter | | | | | | | | |
| Puerto Vallarta, Mexico. 2008 | Did not enter | | | | | | | | |
| Puerto Vallarta, Mexico. 2009 | Did not enter | | | | | | | | |
| Puerto Vallarta, Mexico. 2011 | Did not enter | | | | | | | | |
| Nassau, Bahamas. 2013 | Group Stage | 7 | 4 | 2 | 0 | 2 | 15 | 20 | -5 |
| Costa del Sol, El Salvador. 2015 | Quarter Finals | 5 | 6 | 4 | 0 | 2 | 22 | 14 | +8 |
| Nassau, Bahamas. 2017 | Quarter Finals | 7 | 6 | 3 | 0 | 3 | 26 | 20 | +6 |
| Puerto Vallarta, Mexico. 2019 | Quarter Finals | 5 | 4 | 2 | 0 | 2 | 20 | 11 | +9 |
| San Rafael de Alajuela, Costa Rica. 2021 | Quarter Finals | 5 | 4 | 1 | 0 | 3 | 14 | 24 | -10 |
| Nassau, Bahamas. 2023 | Quarter Finals | 5 | 4 | 1 | 0 | 3 | 6 | 12 | -6 |
| Nassau, Bahamas. 2025 | Group Stage | 5 | 3 | 0 | 0 | 3 | 9 | 12 | -3 |
| Total | 0 Titles | 7/11 | 31 | 13 | 0 | 18 | 112 | 113 | -1 |
