= North American Sand Soccer Championships =

Beach soccer tournament in Virginia

North American Sand Soccer Championships (NASSC)
- Current season, competition or edition: 2025
- Classification: Amateur
- Sport: Beach Soccer
- Founded: 1992, Virginia Beach, Virginia
- Founder: Dick Whalen
- First season: 2001
- COO: Matt Whalen
- Director: Lauren Bland
- Administrator: Gina Koehler
- Organising body: Hampton Roads Soccer Council
- Motto: "Play Fair, Play Smart"
- Divisions: U-09/10 Boys/Girls; U-11/12 Boys/Girls; U-13/14 Boys/Girls; U-15/19 Boys/Girls; Coed High School; Coed Open & Over 30; Adult Men & Women; U.S. OPEN (Pro/Am) Men
- No. of teams: 900+
- Most recent champions: Atletico Rio (Men's, 2025) Virginia Beach Premier (Women's 2025)
- Most titles: HRSC Elite (4)
- Sponsor: Atlantic Union Bank
- Related competitions: Sidekick Venues: Beach Tennis USA; Beach Wrestling; Beach Coed Football; Beach Lacrosse; Juggling Contest
- Tournament format: 5-a-side teams competing in age- and skill-based divisions. Matches are played on sand fields (25×35 to 30×40 yards).
- Website: https://www.sandsoccer.com/

The North American Sand Soccer Championships (NASSC) is an annual beach soccer tournament held in Virginia Beach, Virginia, bringing together teams from across the United States and internationally. The event provides a platform for both amateur and professional beach soccer teams to compete at high levels in various divisions, including men's, women's, and youth categories.

A key component of the tournament is the U.S. Open Beach Soccer Championship, a competition that features top teams competing for national titles. The U.S. Open, which became part of the NASSC in 2001, serves as the premier event for beach soccer in the U.S., attracting international participation and offering cash prizes, as well as opportunities for athletes to showcase their skills on the national stage.

== History ==
The North American Sand Soccer Championships (NASSC) originated in 1992 following a suggestion from an UMBRO USA official to Dick Whalen, a former president of Beach FC, a soccer club in Virginia Beach. At the time, UMBRO had established the U.S. Sand Soccer Federation alongside the development of professional beach soccer tours in Europe and South America.

It is hosted by the Hampton Roads Soccer Council, a non-profit organization. Proceeds from the event benefit the Hampton Roads Soccer Complex, which supports local soccer development and community initiatives. The tournament plays an essential role in funding the complex and promoting soccer in the Hampton Roads area of Virginia. Through its success, the NASSC contributes to the growth of soccer at both the recreational, amateur, and competitive levels in the region.

The first organized sand soccer event in Virginia Beach occurred in May 1994 under the name "Beach Soccer Kickout." It featured 26 youth and adult teams playing on six sand fields. The event was co-hosted by Beach FC and the Virginia Beach Rotary Club.

By 2015, the tournament featured over 975 teams competing on 65 fields, attracting nearly 20 states and a diverse range of festival amusements. The event drew a direct player, coach, and fan population of approximately 35,000, with boardwalk spectators totaling over 100,000 over the 2.5-day period. A component of NASSC is the U.S. Open, which began in 2001 with an international exhibition between the beach soccer national teams of the USA and Canada, along with the inaugural "U.S. National Finals" of top men's Pro-Am teams playing for a national title. In 2003, the U.S. National Finals were transformed into the "U.S. OPEN," serving as the national championship.

Over the past two decades, the U.S. Open has welcomed top beach soccer players worldwide. In 2015, FC Barcelona's men's beach soccer team participated in the U.S. Open, as part of a partnership between NASSC and Beach Soccer Worldwide (BSWW), FIFA's organization for the development of beach soccer, they won the U.S. Open in 2015 and 2017.

The women's beach soccer component of the tournament began to grow as well. The first U.S. National Women's Championship was held in 2003 as part of the inaugural U.S. Open, featuring teams from the US and Canada. The women's beach soccer division continued to grow, and in 2018, NASSC organized the inaugural Women's U.S. Open, a competition that has continued to expand annually.

The NASSC relies on sponsorships from businesses and organizations to support the tournament. These partnerships help fund the event and provide exposure for sponsors.

== U.S. Open results ==
=== Men's Division results ===
Year	U.S. Open Champion
2026	Tacoma Stars
2025	Atletico Rio
2024	Maryzillians
2023	Tacoma Stars
2022	HRSC Elite
2021	Maryzillians
2019	The U BSC
2018	Maryzillians
2017	FC Barcelona
2016	Team Pugg
2015	FC Barcelona
2014	Team Canada
2013	HRSC Elite
2012	Florida Beach Soccer FC
2011	Florida Beach Soccer FC
2010	Team Pugg
2009	FootVolley FC
2008	HRSC Elite
2007	Lusitanos SC
2006	Team Rio
2005	Team Rio
2004	Boys From Brazil
2003	HRSC Elite
2002	Flamilia
2001	Flamilia

=== Women's Division results ===
Year	U.S. Open Champion
2026	Beach Soccer VB
2025	Beach Soccer VB Premier
2024	Beach Soccer VB Elite
2023	Beach Soccer LA
2022	SEVWSA Beach Soccer
2021	SOaR-CAL
2019	MD BSC
