= United States women's national beach soccer team =

Women's national beach soccer team representing the United States

United States
- Nickname(s): US Beach Women; Stars and Stripes
- Association: United States Soccer Federation (USSF)
- Confederation: CONCACAF
- Head coach: (United States) Morgan Church
- Captain: Jeane Sunseri-Warp and Ali Hall
- FIFA code: USA
- BSWW ranking: 38
First colors	Second colors

First international
- United States 5–3 Mexico (Miami, United States; 2019)

World Cup
- Appearances: 0 (first in —)
- Best result: Did not qualify

The United States women's national beach soccer team represents the United States in international beach soccer competitions. It is controlled by the United States Soccer Federation (USSF), the governing body for soccer in the United States.

The program was officially launched in 2019 and has been steadily developing through domestic training camps, international friendlies, and regional CONCACAF competitions.

== History ==
The United States women's national beach soccer team was established in 2019 as part of the USSF's effort to grow the women's game in beach soccer, following the success of the men's program. The team made its international debut in 2019 and has since participated in various BSWW-sanctioned events, friendlies, and CONCACAF regional qualifiers and tournaments.

The program saw increased activity starting in 2022–2023, with regular domestic training camps held in locations such as Chula Vista, California, and other coastal venues. In 2023, the team recorded its most successful calendar year to date with a 6–3 record in international matches.

The team continues to focus on player development, with many participants coming from backgrounds in outdoor soccer, futsal, and collegiate programs.

== Coaching staff ==
As of January 2026

Position	Name	Ref.
Head coach	(United States) Morgan Church	
Assistant coach	(United States) Ryan Futagaki	

== Players ==
=== Current squad ===
The following 14 players were called up by head coach Morgan Church for the team's January 2026 training camp in the Bahamas.

Note: Flags indicate national team as defined under FIFA eligibility rules; some limited exceptions apply. Players may hold more than one non-FIFA nationality.

No.	Pos.	Nation	Player
—	DF	USA	Hannah Adler (Cali BSC; Santa Barbara, Calif.; 18/17)
—	GK	USA	Vanessa Amaral (NMD Beach; Union City, Calif.; 3/0)
—	GK	USA	Gabriella Batmani (Cali BSC; San Jose, Calif.; 18/0)
—	FW	USA	Nikki Haimes (Beach Soccer Zeeland; Miami, Fla.; 12/5)
—	DF	USA	Ali Hall (NMD Beach; Chicago, Ill.; 21/11)
—	FW	USA	Rachel Hunter (BSVB; Tampa, Fla.; 12/4)
—	FW	USA	Samantha Martinez (Cali BSC; Redondo Beach, Calif.; 12/14)
—		USA	Jen Munoz (Botafoga USA; Costa Mesa, Calif.; 0/0)
—		USA	Vivian Oray (Cruzn BSC; Kisumu, Kenya; 5/1)
—	FW	USA	Tori Phillips (Cruzn BSC; San Clemente, Calif.; 3/1)
—	DF	USA	Jeané Sunseri-Warp (Cali BSC; San Jose, Calif.; 33/11)
—	FW	USA	Ashley Triplett (BSVB; Virginia Beach, Va.; 9/1)
—	DF	USA	Vanessa Valentine (Cali BSC; San Diego, Calif.; 18/3)
—		USA	Marissa Vasquez (NMD Beach; Diamond Bar, Calif.; 6/0)

== Results and fixtures ==
=== All-time record ===
The United States women's national beach soccer team has competed internationally since its establishment in 2019.

- In 2023, the team achieved its most successful calendar year to date, posting a 6–3 record across nine international matches and scoring a team-high 41 goals in a single year.
- Recent tournament performances include:
  - 2nd place at the 2024 Acapulco Cup (1 loss to Spain 2–4, wins over Mexico 4–0 and Costa Rica 6–4).
  - 3rd place at the 2025 El Salvador Beach Soccer Cup (1 win, 1 loss, 1 draw across three matches).

=== Notable early results ===
The team's first matches were in the 2019 World Beach Games qualifiers in San Salvador, El Salvador:

- August 3, 2019: vs Mexico (Group Stage) – 1–2 loss
- Additional matches in the tournament included wins over El Salvador and Bahamas, finishing second overall in the inaugural event.

=== FIFA Beach Soccer World Cup ===
FIFA Beach Soccer World Cup record
Year	Round	Position	Pld	W	W(a.e.t./pens)	L	GF	GA
All editions	Did not qualify	–	–	–	–	–	–	–

== See also ==
- United States men's national beach soccer team
- United States women's national soccer team
