= Beach soccer =

Variant of association football played on sand

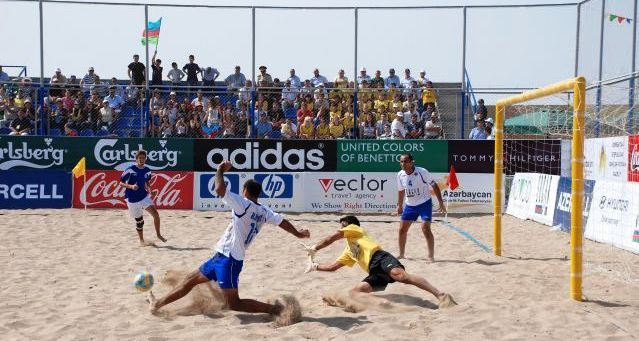
- International match
- Highest governing body: Beach Soccer Worldwide (1992–2004; co-organizer since 2005), FIFA (2005–present)
- Nicknames: beach footie, beasal
- First played: 1992 at Will Rogers Beach, Los Angeles, United States

Characteristics
- Contact: Yes
- Team members: 5 per side
- Mixed-sex: No, separate competitions
- Type: Team sport, ball game
- Equipment: Beach soccer ball, shirts with sleeves, shorts; footwear is not allowed
- Venue: Beach soccer court

Presence
- Country or region: Worldwide
- Olympic: No
- Paralympic: No

Beach soccer, also known as beach football, sand football or sand soccer, is a variant of association football played on a beach or some form of sand between two teams of five players each. Players have the ability to go on both sides of the beach court.

Association football has long been played informally on beaches. Beach soccer was introduced in 1992 as an effort to codify rules for the game by the founders of Beach Soccer Worldwide, a company set up to develop the sport and responsible for the majority of its tournaments. FIFA has held the Beach Soccer World Cup biennially since 2005.

The first international matches were played in 1993 for men and 2009 for women. As of July 2023, there are 193 men's and 64 women's clubs and 101 men's and 23 women's national teams sorted in the Beach Soccer Worldwide Rankings.

== History ==
Beach soccer or sand football (futebol de praia or futebol de areia) originated in Brazil, more precisely in Rio de Janeiro and specifically Copacabana Beach in the mid-20th century. In 1950, the first official tournament was created to unify small neighborhood tournaments that happened since 1940. It has grown to be an international game. The participation of international players such as Eric Cantona, Júnior, Romário and Zico has helped to expand the sport's popularity worldwide.

Beach soccer had been played recreationally for years and in different formats. In 1992, the laws of the game were envisioned and a pilot event was staged by the founding partners of Beach Soccer Worldwide (BSWW) in Los Angeles, and the sport was adopted by Beach Soccer Los Angeles in 2017, being played all around Los Angeles County. By 1993, the first professional beach soccer competition was organized at Miami Beach with teams from the United States, Brazil, Argentina and Italy taking part.

In April 1994, the first event to be covered by network television transmissions was held on Copacabana Beach in Rio de Janeiro, and the city hosted the first Beach Soccer World Championship in 1995. The competition was won by the host nation, making Brazil the first-ever world champions of Beach Soccer. Commercial interest began to match developments on the field, and growing demand for the sport around the world gave rise to the Pro Beach Soccer Tour in 1996.

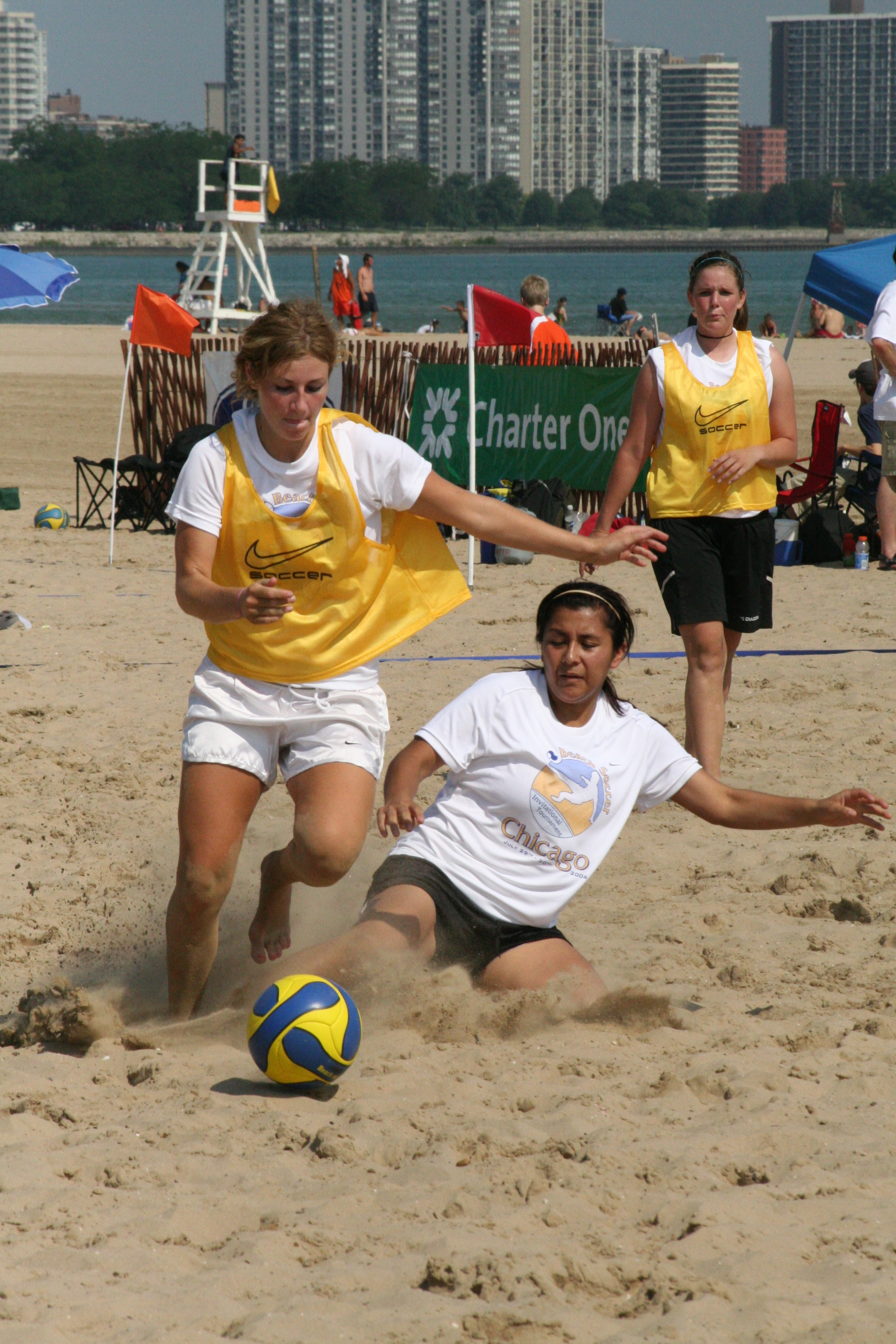
A beach soccer game at the 2006 Chicago Beach Soccer Invitational

The first Pro Beach Soccer Tour included a total of 60 games in two years across South America, Europe, Asia and the United States. Interest generated by the tour in Europe led to the creation of the European Pro Beach Soccer League in 1998, providing a more solid infrastructure that would increase the professionalism of the spectacle. EPBSL, now known as the Euro Beach Soccer League, brought promoters together from across the continent and satisfied the demands of the media, sponsors and fans. Four years on from its creation, the first step in the building of a legitimate worldwide competition structure for the sport of pro beach soccer had been taken.

Behind the scenes developments were also taking place, with the Beach Soccer Company relocating its headquarters to Europe, firstly to Monaco and then Barcelona, before becoming Pro Beach Soccer, S.L. in April 2000. One year later, they would join forces with Octagon Koch Tavares (who had continued to organise the World Championships and events in South America) to form a single entity known as Beach Soccer Worldwide (BSWW), with the aim of unifying all major Pro Beach Soccer tournaments in the world under the same structure and providing representation of the sport to major sponsors, the media and FIFA.

The next four years would see this growth consolidated by further progress both on and off the field. By 2004, some 17 nations had entered teams, contributing to vastly expanded television coverage of beach soccer and unprecedented demand from promoters in more than seventy countries looking to stage events. This growing interest has enabled BSWW to secure sponsorship deals with international companies such as Coca-Cola, McDonald's, and MasterCard, the latter of which increased its involvement in 2004 by becoming the title sponsor of the Euro Beach Soccer League.

FIFA became the global governing body of the sport in 2005 and organized the first FIFA Beach Soccer World Cup. The 2006 CONCACAF Beach Soccer Championship served as a qualification tournament for the 2006 FIFA Beach Soccer World Cup. The CONCACAF tournament saw the United States emerge victorious, defeating Canada in the final. It played a key role in the development of beach soccer within the region, showcasing emerging talent and promoting the sport's growth.

FIFA has recognized Beach Soccer Worldwide as the major entity behind the creation and growth of beach soccer, forming a "highly promising" partnership that was seen "in its full splendour" in the 2005 World Cup, held in Copacabana, Rio de Janeiro. France won the first World Cup, and the next year Brazil won it at the same venue. The World Cup has continued to flourish with the first held outside of Brazil in 2008 and future World Cups spreading as far out as Tahiti in 2013 and Portugal in 2015.

In the late 2010s, significant strides were made in the development of beach soccer in the United States. A team based in South Florida called the Florida Beach Soccer FC, coached by former professional soccer player Chris Antonopoulos along with other beach soccer national team players like Francis Farberoff, Benyam Astorga and Oscar Gil, achieved success on the national and international stages, including a victory at the North American Sand Soccer Championships (NASSC) in 2011 and again in 2012.

The NASSC gained international prominence with the participation of FC Barcelona's beach soccer team, which clinched titles in 2015 and 2017. This period also saw increased participation in high-profile events such as the Clearwater Beach Soccer Tournament, part of the Major Beach Soccer National Championship Series sponsored by the United Soccer League, which bolstered the sport's visibility and competitiveness.

=== Women's beach soccer ===
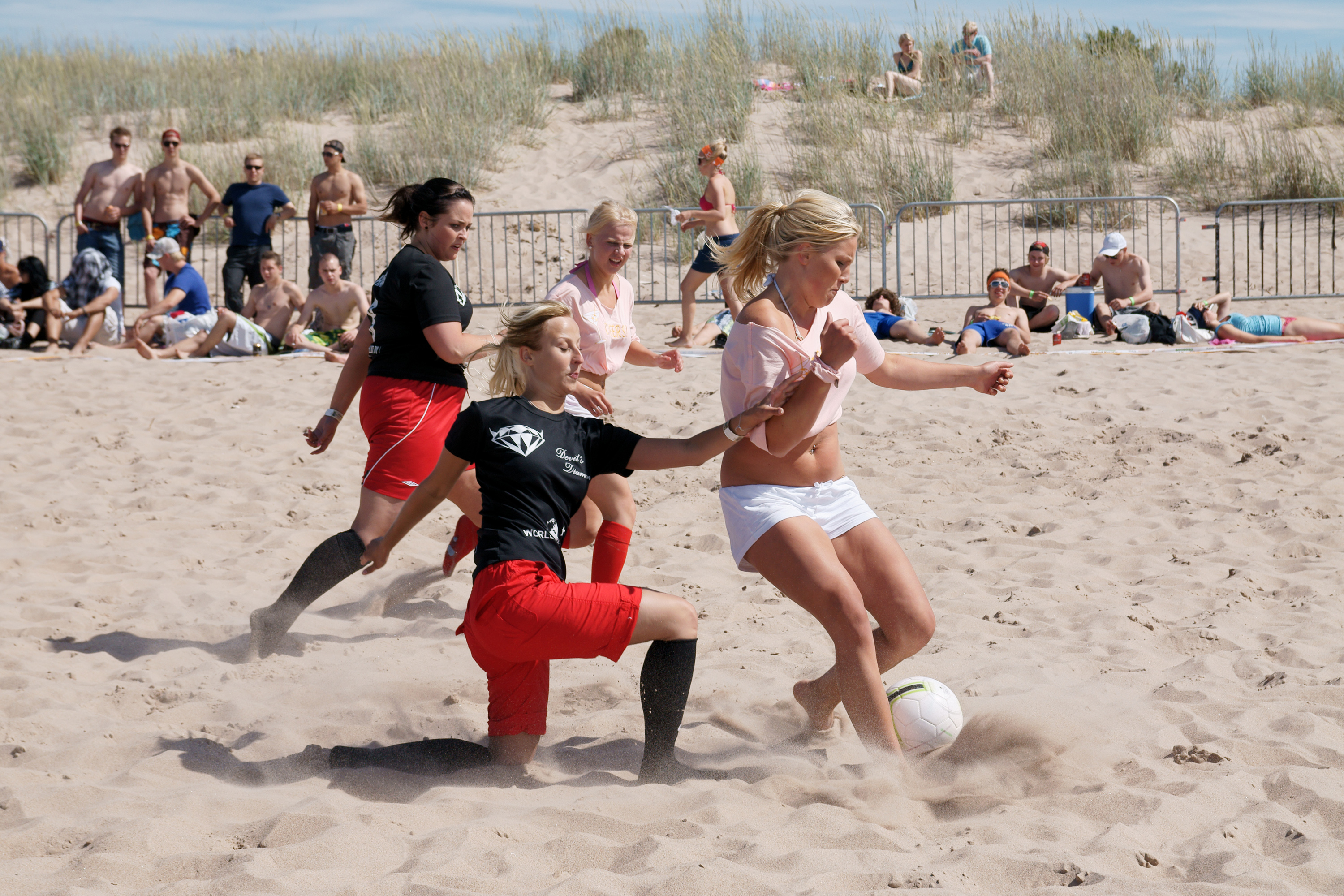
Women's beach soccer game at YBF 2010 in Yyteri Beach, Pori, Finland

In Europe, the Women's Euro Beach Soccer Cup and Women's Euro Winners Cup were first held in 2016, whereas the Women's Euro Beach Soccer League debuted in 2021. In addition, the 2019 World Beach Games had a women's beach soccer tournament, and a Women's Intercontinental Beach Soccer Cup was held in 2021. The North American Sand Soccer Championships introduced women's beach soccer in 2019.

As of 2026, FIFA and continental confederations do not host major women's world championships, though regional events persist. The Asian Beach Games, European Games, and South American Beach Games lack women's beach soccer. Recent developments include the Women's Americas Winners Cup in El Salvador (2025, won by São Pedro for the third consecutive time), Women's Euro Beach Soccer League in Nazaré (2024), and pro divisions in tournaments like Fort Lauderdale Beach (2026). Youth and amateur events, such as Beach Soccer Cape Cod (2026 girls) and Beach Soccer Cup Cavallino (2026).

== Rules ==
The rules of beach soccer are based on the Laws of the Game of association football, with some modifications.

=== Field ===
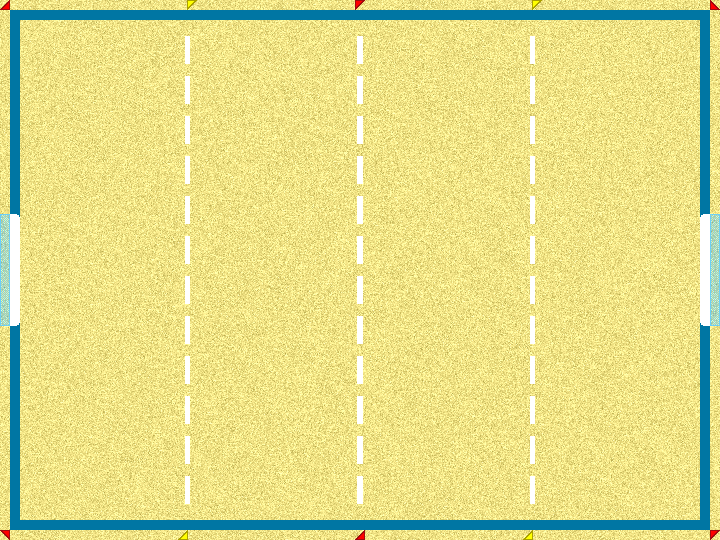
A beach soccer pitch. The dashed white lines are not marked on the pitch and must be inferred by players and officials.

A beach soccer field is a level sandy area smaller than a regular football pitch. The field is cleared of pebbles and seashells along with any other objects that could injure a player.

The field is rectangular in shape and the touchline is longer than the goal line. The field dimensions are:

- Length: 35–37 metres (38.3–40.5 yards)
- Width: 26–28 metres (28.4–30.6 yards)

The penalty area is at a distance of 9 metres (9.8 yards) from the goal and is marked by two yellow flags placed outside the field and next to the touchlines. Two red flags opposite each other are at the centre of the field to represent the halfway line. The goals are smaller than their standard association football counterparts, being 2.2 metres (7 ft 3 in) from the ground to the bottom of the crossbar and 5.5 metres (18 ft) in width between the inside of each upright.

=== Players ===
Each team consists of five players including the goalkeeper. An unlimited number of substitutions is allowed, from a selection of seven substitutes in FIFA competitions (the number may vary in unofficial competitions). Both throw-ins and kick-ins are allowed, so the pace and flow of the game can be faster than regular football. Shoes and socks are not permitted; players must play in bare feet. Goal clearances (the equivalent of goal kicks) are taken by the goalkeepers using their hands to throw or release the ball. A goal cannot be scored directly from a goal clearance.

=== Match length ===
A game lasts 36 minutes and is split into three 12-minute periods. Unlike in association football, in professional matches the referee is not the sole arbiter of the end of a period. A separate timekeeping official controls the game clock, which is stopped whenever the ball is out of play and typically counts down to zero, as in futsal. Draws are usually not permitted in beach soccer. If the score is level at the end of regular time, the match goes into a three-minute period of extra time, followed, if necessary, by a penalty shoot-out. As in association football, each team takes five penalty kicks alternately. If the score remains level after five kicks by each team, the shoot-out proceeds to sudden death, with the teams taking one kick each until one team scores and the other does not.

=== Referees and discipline ===
Beach soccer has two on-field referees (the referee and the second referee) who cooperatively officiate the game. They may be assisted by a third referee, who acts in a manner similar to football's fourth official, and a timekeeper.

Yellow and red cards are also used in beach soccer. Unlike in association football, a team can bring on a substitute to replace a dismissed player after two minutes have elapsed. However, as in futsal, this period of numerical advantage ends early if the penalised team concedes a goal.

=== Free kicks and penalties ===
Free kicks are awarded for various fouls. All free kicks are direct free kicks and must be taken by the player who was fouled or by their substitute in case of injury, except when awarded for handling the ball, in which case any player from the opposing team may take the kick. The laws require all players, apart from the opposing goalkeeper, to clear the area between the kicker and the goal. Penalties are awarded for fouls committed by the defending team within the penalty area.

=== Other major differences from association football ===
A beach soccer ball

- The ball is inflated to a lower pressure (0.4–0.6 atm, compared to 0.6–1.1 atm in football).
- Similarly to futsal, there is no offside rule.
- Preventing an opponent from performing a bicycle kick is considered a specific foul.
- Teams may not keep possession of the ball in their own penalty area for more than four seconds.
- Goalkeepers may handle a back-pass from a team-mate a maximum of once during their team's possession. This is considered reset once the opposing team has possessed the ball.

== Tournaments ==
The following are some of the competitions:

=== International ===
- FIFA Beach Soccer World Cup
- Intercontinental Cup
- BSWW Mundialito
- World Winners Cup
- Mundialito de Clubes
- Persian Beach Soccer Cup

=== Multi-sports games ===
- World Beach Games
- Asian Beach Games
- Bolivarian Beach Games
- European Games
- Mediterranean Beach Games
- South American Beach Games
- South American Games

=== Pro/Amateur International ===
==== United States ====
- The Beach Soccer Championships – Oceanside, California
- North American Sand Soccer Championships (U.S. Open) – Virginia Beach, Virginia
- Sand Duels Beach Soccer – Ocean City, Maryland
- Clearwater Beach Soccer tournament (Major Beach Soccer National Championship) - Clearwater Beach, Florida
- National Beach Soccer League (NBSL) (Fort Lauderdale Open) - Fort Lauderdale, Florida
- Pro-Am Beach Soccer (U.S. Beach Soccer National Championship) - San Diego, California
- Santa Cruz Beach Soccer Championships (Open Classic Tournament) - Santa Cruz, California
- South Padre Island Beach Soccer Tournament - South Padre Island, Texas
- Soccer in the Sand Series - San Diego, Seattle, Grand Haven
- Florida Sports Coast Beach Soccer Challenge – Hudson, Florida
- SF Beach Soccer Classic – San Francisco, California

==== Mexico ====
- Acapulco Beach Soccer Cup (Acapulco Annual international invitational)

==== South America ====
- Americas Winners Cup

=== Confederation ===
AFC (Asian Football Confederation):

- AFC Beach Soccer Asian Cup

CAF (Confederation of African Football):

- Beach Soccer Africa Cup of Nations

CONCACAF (Confederation of North, Central American and Caribbean Association Football):

- CONCACAF Beach Soccer Championship

CONMEBOL (South American Football Confederation):

- Copa América de Beach Soccer
- Copa Libertadores de Fútbol Playa

OFC (Oceania Football Confederation):

- OFC Beach Soccer Nations Cup

UEFA (Union of European Football Associations):

- Euro Beach Soccer Cup
- Euro Beach Soccer League
- UEFA Beach Soccer Championship
- BSWW Euro Winners Cup and Women's Euro Winners Cup

== All-time legends and greatest players ==
Beach soccer has attracted talent, including dedicated beach soccer specialists and former professional footballers who transitioned to the sport. Prominent figures are often recognized through awards such as the adidas Golden Ball (best player) at the FIFA Beach Soccer World Cup, the annual Best Player award from Beach Soccer Worldwide (BSWW) at the Beach Soccer Stars gala, and other honors like top scorer or MVP titles.

Widely regarded as the greatest beach soccer player of all time, Madjer (Portugal, born 1977 as João Victor Saraiva) holds numerous records, including being the first to score 1,000 international beach soccer goals in September 2016 during a qualifier against England. He has scored 88 goals across FIFA Beach Soccer World Cups (most all-time) and won the Golden Ball twice (2005, 2006), the Golden Shoe three times (2005, 2006, 2008), and a record 11 individual awards overall.

=== Brazil ===
- Bruno Xavier — BSWW Best Player (2014); multiple-time FIFA award nominee/winner; dynamic forward central to Brazil's successes.
- Mauricinho — BSWW Best Player (2017); standout performer in recent years.
- Júnior Negão — All-time top scorer in some eras (72 World Cup goals); legendary forward and pioneer.
- Others: Benjamin, Neném, Rodrigo (recent FIFA Golden Ball winner).

=== Portugal ===
- Madjer — Considered greatest player of all time.
- Jordan Santos — BSWW Best Player (2019); key in Portugal's 2015 and 2019 World Cup wins.
- Bê Martins — BSWW Best Player (2022, 2024); versatile midfielder/forward with recent dominance.
- Others: Alan (all-time high World Cup goals for Portugal), Belchior.

=== Spain ===
- Ramiro Amarelle — Pioneer and one of the most influential; top-ranked by peers for leadership and skill in the early professional era.
- Llorenç Gómez (born 1991) — BSWW Best Player (2018); prolific forward nearing 1,000 career goals before injury-forced retirement.

=== U.S. and North American standouts ===
- Francis Farberoff (USA) — MVP of the 2006 CONCACAF Beach Soccer Championship; former head coach of the U.S. national team.
- Nick Perera (USA) — All-time U.S. leading scorer (114 goals in 94 caps); captain and key in regional successes.
- Alessandro Canale (USA) — Top World Cup performer for U.S. (multiple goals); one of the most capped.
- Chris Toth (USA) — Longtime goalkeeper nearing/exceeding 100 caps; reliable in qualifiers and World Cups.
- Others: Ben Astorga (early standout, record CONCACAF goal), Eddie Soto, Gabe Silveira (2023 U.S. Player of the Year), Ricardo Carvalho (recent U.S. standout), Nico Perea.

=== Other countries ===
- Noël Ott (Switzerland, born 1994) — FIFA Golden Ball (2021); BSWW Rising Star (2014); one of the most decorated non-Brazilian/Portuguese/Spanish players.
- Ozu Moreira (Japan) — BSWW Best Player (2021); FIFA Golden Ball; standout in Asia's rise.
- Gabriele Gori (Italy) — Prominent top scorer in FIFA World Cup eras.
- Dejan Stankovic (Switzerland) — Multiple honors; key figure despite inconsistent team success.

=== Former professional football stars who transitioned ===
- Romário (Brazil) — FIFA World Cup.
- Eric Cantona (France) — Played for years, captaining France in events like the 2001 World Championship.
- Zico (Brazil)
- Others: Júnior (Brazil, also a coach and legend award recipient), Julio Salinas (Spain), Michel (Spain), Matt Le Tissier (England), Franco Causio,(Italy) Chris Antonopoulos (USA), Claudio Gentile (Italy), and the Van de Kerkhof twins.

== See also ==
- Beach handball
- Beach rugby
- Beach volleyball
- Footvolley
- Futsal
- Street football
- Teqball

== Results database ==
- beach SOCCER RESULTS (1993–2019)
- Beach Soccer Worldwide (1993–2020)
- All-time results (2021-Ongoing)
- The Roon Ba (2010–2023)
- The Roon Ba (2010–2023)
- The Roon Ba (2010–2020)
- Fédération Internationale de Football Association (FIFA) - FIFA.com (Results in Team Profile)
