= Underwater hockey in Great Britain =

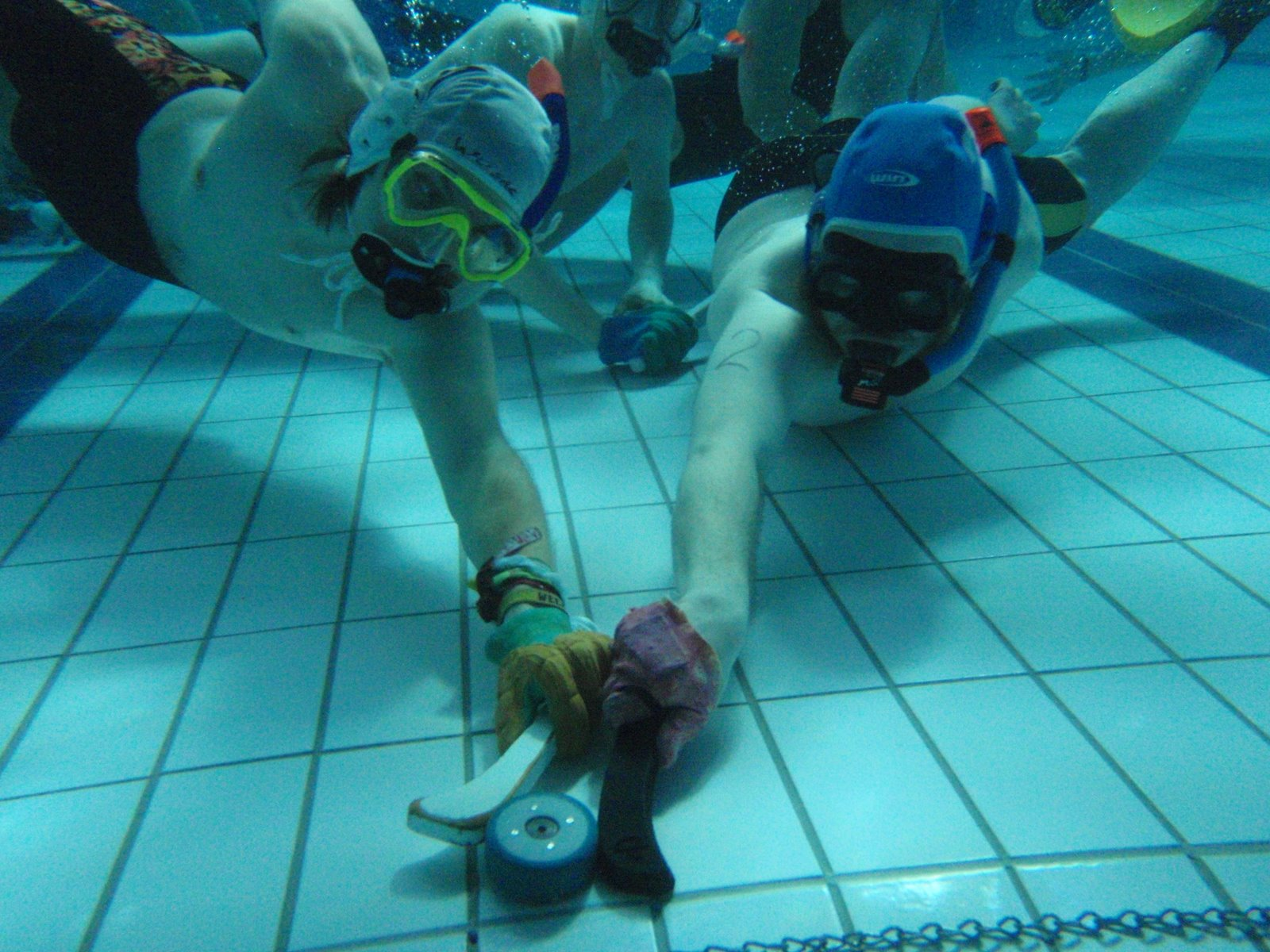
- An underwater hockey match during the 2009 Student Nationals in Bangor
- Country: Great Britain
- Governing body: British Octopush Association
- National team: Great Britain
- Nicknames: Octopush; UWH
- First played: 1954 in Southsea, Hampshire
- Registered players: >1,800

National competitions
- Underwater Hockey World Championships; Underwater Hockey Intercontinental Championships

Club competitions
- National Championship; Nautilus; Ladies Championship; Veterans Championship; Student Nationals; Alumni Nationals; Junior Nationals

Underwater hockey in Great Britain was first played in Southsea, Hampshire where it was invented in 1954. It is governed nationally by the British Octopush Association.

== History ==
Underwater hockey was started by Alan Blake in 1954. Blake was a founder-member of the then newly formed Southsea Sub-Aqua Club, he and other divers including John Ventham, Jack Willis, and Frank Lilleker first played this game in the Guildhall Baths in Portsmouth. CMAS (the world governing body for underwater hockey) however, still states on its website that the sport originated with the Royal Navy in the same time period.

The first rules were tested in a 1954 two-on-two game and Alan Blake made the following announcement in the November 1954 issue of the British Sub-Aqua Club's then-official magazine Neptune: "Our indoor training programme is getting under way, including wet activities other than in baths, and our new underwater game "Octopush". Of which more later when we have worked out the details".

The first underwater hockey competition was a three-way tournament between teams from Southsea, Bournemouth and Brighton underwater hockey clubs in early 1955. Southsea won, and are still highly ranked at national level today winning 20 out of 52 national championships, which have been played annually since 1969.

Great Britain's men's national team played in the first Underwater Hockey World Championships in 1980, finishing as runners-up. Great Britain's women's national team first World Championships appearance was the fifth edition (fourth with a women's tournament) in 1988, resulting in a fourth-place finish.

Both men's and women's teams competed in the first edition of the European Championships in 1985, held at Crystal Palace Aquatics Centre, London, with both teams winning gold. The UK hosted the tournament again in 1993, this time at Ponds Forge, Sheffield. In the next edition, in 1995, the women's team claimed a second gold medal in the tournament with a third coming in 2008, and a fourth in 2010.

Great Britain's first gold medal in the World Championships was in 2002 in the U-19 men's division, with further golds coming in the 2009 and 2011 women's tournament.

The country, hosted its first World Championships in 2006, and its first Junior World Championships in 2019, both at Ponds Forge, Sheffield.

The sport was badly affected by the COVID-19 pandemic, seeing the majority of tournaments in 2020 and 2021 cancelled; in addition to 41 clubs out of the 114 registered at the start of the pandemic (36%) folding.

Great Britain's elite and masters women's team took home gold in 2025's inaugural Intercontinental Championships, a new event to act as qualifiers for a growing World Championship.

Today there are 70 clubs registered with the British Octopush Association (68 British and 2 Irish).

== Organisation ==
Underwater hockey is governed nationally in Great Britain by the British Octopush Association (BOA) and has been since 1976. They were recognised as the official governing body for the sport a year later by the British Sub-Aqua Club (BSAC), governing body for all sub-aqua sport in the United Kingdom, who also still govern the sport but to a limited extended. In 2013, the BOA affiliated itself to BSAC. The BOA runs the Great Britain national team at all levels and is responsible for major national competitions.

=== Scotland, Wales, and Northern Ireland ===
Scotland and Wales have their own governing bodies for underwater hockey that work with the BOA, Scottish Underwater Hockey and Underwater Hockey Wales respectively. These organise regional competitions for the respective home nations and also run national teams. However the use of the Scottish and Welsh national teams is limited with the Great Britain side being favoured for the majority of competitions.

Underwater hockey in Ireland operates as part of an all-Ireland basis. Therefore, the control in Northern Ireland is that of Comhairle Fo-Thuinn not the BOA.

Together with Ireland's Comhairle Fo-Thuinn, Scottish Underwater Hockey, and Underwater Hockey Wales organise the Cetic Cup for national teams of the three nations. The tournament began in 2022.

Celtic Cup results

Year	Venue	1st	2nd	3rd	4th	5th	6th	Ref.
2022	(Wales) (Pembrokeshire); Haverfordwest	Scotland A	Wales A	(Republic of Ireland) Ireland B	(Republic of Ireland) Ireland A	Wales B	Scotland B	
2023	(Scotland) (Orkney); Kirkwall	Reformatted due to lack of competitors: Orkney (rep. Scotland) vs Limerick (rep. Ireland)						
2024	(Republic of Ireland) (County Limerick); Limerick	Scotland A	Wales A	Scotland B	Merrows (c)	Belfast (c)	—N/a	

(c) = club team

== Demographics ==
Of the 68 British clubs associated with the BOA, 55 are English, 7 are Scottish, 3 are Welsh, and 1 is Northern Irish. 12 of the 68 clubs are student clubs, these clubs are associated with the universities of Aberdeen, Bangor, Edinburgh, Lancaster, Liverpool, Newcastle, Oxford, Plymouth, Swansea, York, Warwick, and Belfast. In addition, the BOA had two associated Irish clubs.

== Competitions ==
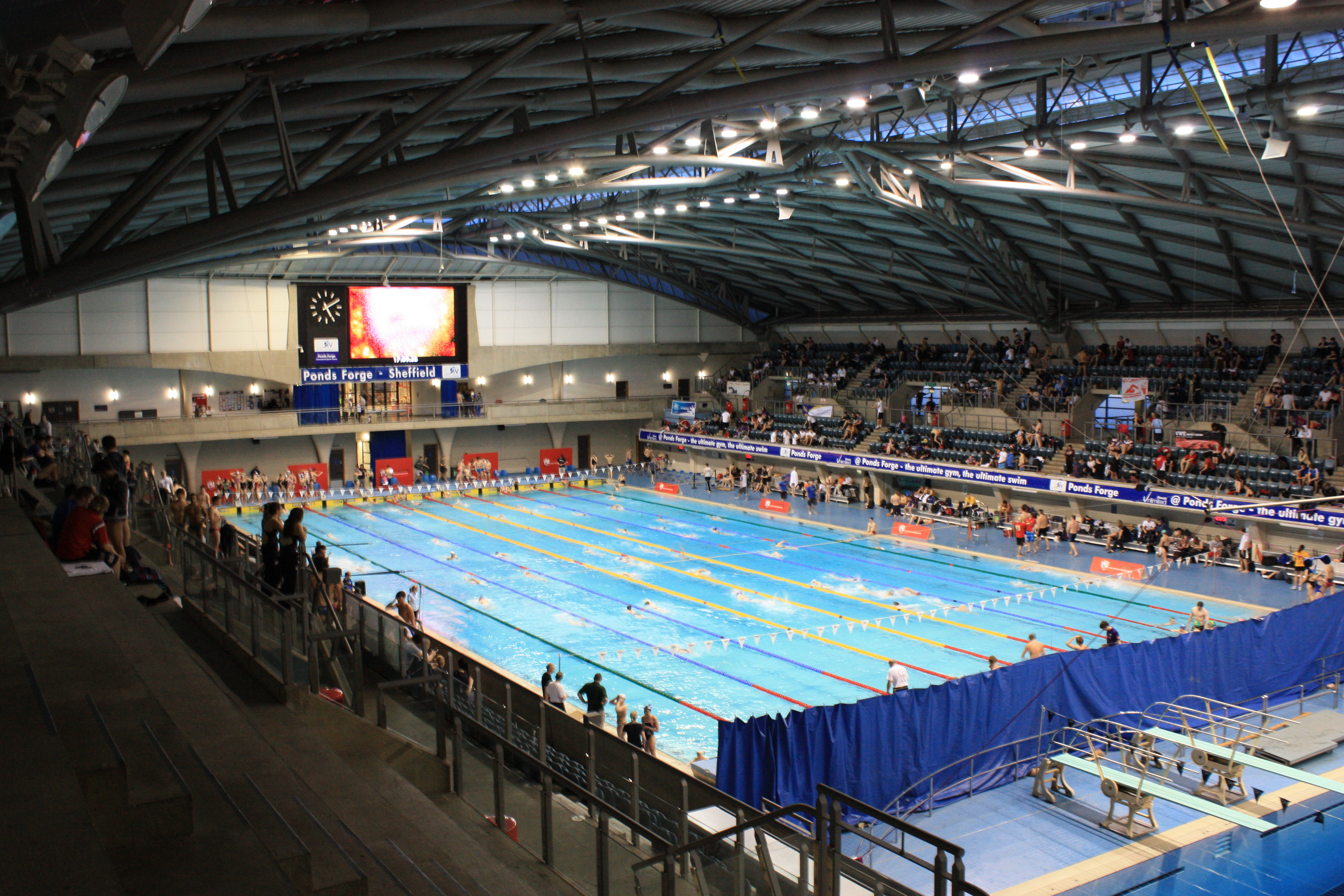
Ponds Forge, Sheffield regularly hosts major underwater competitions. The Olympic-sized swimming pool can be split into three courts.

The BOA operates all major underwater hockey competitions in the UK including the National Championships, Nautilus, Ladies National Championships, Veterans Championship, Student Nationals, and Junior Nationals. Other competitions also run throughout the year.

In the UK, the majority of club competitions are mixed-sex.

Competitions are usually held at the John Charles Centre for Sport in Leeds or Ponds Forge in Sheffield.

=== National Championship ===
The national championships are a multi round tournament beginning with qualifiers after new year and the finals in late spring or early summer. The winners of the BOA national championships are:

2020s	2010s	2000s	1990s	1980s	1970s	1960s
2026 Yorkshire; 2025 Team South West; 2024 Southsea; 2023 Southsea; 2022 Southsea; 2021 Cancelled; 2020 Cancelled	2019 Southsea; 2018 Southsea; 2017 Southsea; 2016 Southsea; 2015 Southsea; 2014 Southsea; 2013 Southport; 2012 Southsea; 2011 Southport; 2010 Southport	2009 Southsea; 2008 Southport; 2007 Southport; 2006 Team Ealing; 2005 Southport; 2004 Southport; 2003 Southport; 2002 Reading; 2001 Reading; 2000 Reading	1999 Reading; 1998 West Wickham; 1997 Southsea; 1996 Southsea; 1995 The Club; 1994 Leeds; 1993 Southsea; 1992 Southsea; 1991 Harlow; 1990 Harlow	1989 Harlow; 1988 Harlow; 1987 Harlow; 1986 Harlow; 1985 West Wickham; 1984 West Wickham; 1983 Harlow; 1982 Harlow; 1981 Harlow; 1980 Harlow	1979 Harlow; 1978 Harlow; 1977 Harlow; 1976 Southsea; 1975 Southsea; 1974 Aquatic Club; 1973 Southsea; 1972 Southsea; 1971 Southsea; 1970 Southsea	1969 Southsea

=== Nautilus Competition ===
The Nautilus competition is an annual national mini-league tournament held in the autumn. The results of which determin the seeding for the national championship qualifiers. Winners are:

2020s	2010s	2000s	1990s	1980s
2026 Southsea; 2025 Yorkshire; 2024 West Wickham; 2023 Southsea; 2022 Southsea; 2021 Southsea; 2020 Cancelled	2019 Southsea; 2018 Southsea; 2017 Southsea; 2016 Southsea; 2015 Southsea; 2014 Southport; 2013 Southsea; 2012 Southsea; 2011 Southsea; 2010 Southport	2009 Southport; 2008 Southsea; 2007 Southsea; 2006 Southport; 2005 Southsea; 2004 Southport; 2003 Southport; 2002 Reading; 2001 Southport; 2000 Reading	1999 Slough; 1998 Reading; 1997 Reading; 1996 Southsea; 1995 Leeds; 1994 The Club; 1993 West Wickham; 1992 Southsea; 1991 Southsea; 1990 Harlow	1989 Northampton; 1988 Harlow; 1987 Harlow; 1986 Harlow

=== Ladies Championship ===
The ladies only national championship is usually held in late winter or early spring. Winners are:

2020s	2010s	2000s	1990s	1980s
2026 London Ladies; 2025 London Ladies; 2024 London Ladies; 2023 London Ladies; 2022 London Ladies; 2021 Cancelled; 2020 London Ladies	2019 South West Ladies; 2018 London Ladies; 2017 London Ladies; 2016 London Ladies; 2015 Yorkshire Ladies; 2014 London Ladies; 2013 South West Ladies; 2012 South West Ladies; 2011 North West Ladies; 2010 South West Ladies	2009 North West Ladies; 2008 South West Ladies; 2007 South West Ladies; 2006 South West Ladies; 2005 South West Ladies; 2004 South West Ladies; 2003 South West Ladies; 2002 South West Ladies; 2001 Wahine Warriors; 2000 Spectrum Angels	1999 Cheltenham and Bristol; 1998 Spectrum Angels; 1997 Yorkshire Ladies; 1996 Spectrum Angels; 1995 Yorkshire Ladies; 1994 Yorkshire Ladies; 1993 Yorkshire Ladies; 1992 Yorkshire Ladies; 1991 Yorkshire Ladies; 1990 Yorkshire Ladies	1989 Yorkshire Ladies; 1988 Yorkshire Ladies; 1987 Yorkshire Ladies; 1986 Yorkshire Ladies; 1985 London Ladies; 1984 S.E.W.O.C.

=== Veterans Championship ===
From 2018 to 2022, the BOA held the veterans championship for player over 50, winners of the competition are:

2020s	2010s
2022 Auld Alliance; 2021 Cancelled; 2020 Cancelled	2019 Southern; 2018 South East

=== Masters Championship ===
A master's championship for player over 30 began in 2026 with a failed aim to restart the veterans championship aswell, winners of the competition are:

2020s
- 2026 Yorkshire

=== Student Nationals ===
British underwater hockey student national were formalised as a BOA event for the first time in 2020. Previous events were informally organised by participating universities, with one university hosting. The first formal BOA student nationals was to be held at The Alan Higgs Centre in Coventry before being cancelled due to the COVID-19 pandemic. Subsequent events have been held at John Charles Centre for Sport in Leeds. Winning universities are:

2020s	2010s	2000s
2026 London; 2025 Oxford; 2024 West Yorkshire (Note: A representative team of students from West Yorkshire); 2023 West Yorkshire; 2022 Plymouth; 2021 Cancelled; 2020 Cancelled	2019 Aberystwyth; 2018 Plymouth; 2017 Plymouth; 2016 Plymouth; 2015 Plymouth; 2014 Plymouth; 2013 Plymouth; 2012 Plymouth; 2011 Edinburgh; 2010 Plymouth	2009 Plymouth; 2008 Glasgow; 2007 Bristol-Bath; 2006 Plymouth; 2005 Aberdeen; 2004 Aberdeen; 2003 Aberdeen

=== Alumni Nationals ===
In 2025, an alumni competition was started for graduate teams. It is held concurrently with Student Nationals.

2020s
- 2026 Leeds
- 2025 Draft

=== Junior Nationals ===
Junior nations is currently split into various age categories. Winners of the competitions are:

2020s	2010s
2026 Yorkshire (U-16), Yorkshire (U-14), Lancashire (U-11); 2025 Yorkshire (U-16), Yorkshire / South West (U-14), South West (U-11); 2024 Yorkshire (U-16), South West (U-14), South West (U-11); 2023 Northern Lights (U-21), North (U-16), South West (U-14), South West (U-12), South West (U-10); 2022 South West (U-19), Batley (U-16), South West (U-14), Pembroke (U-12); 2021 Cancelled; 2020 Cancelled	2019 South West (U-19), Batley (U-16), South West (U-14), Pembroke (U-12); 2018 North (U-18), South West (U-16), South West (U-14), South West (U-12)

=== 4s ===
In 2024, the BOA started an 4s tournament to be held in the winter (W) and summer (S) of each year. Winners of the competitions are:

2020s
- 2024W South West

=== Restart ===
A special one-off post COVID-19 restart tournament took place in August 2021 and was won by Southsea.

=== Other competitions ===
Outside of the above tournaments, which are organised by the BOA and form the BOA calendar, a number of other underwater hockey competitions occur in Great Britain on a more local or invitational level. These include, but are not limited to:

- Bristol Tournament – Organised and hosted by Bristol underwater hockey club
- Barbipush – Organised and hosted by Guildford underwater hockey club held outdoors at the Guildford Lido
- Gowland Cup – Organised and hosted by University of Aberdeen underwater hockey club
- Manchester Octopush Tournament – Organised and hosted by Manchester underwater hockey club at the Manchester Aquatics Centre (currently on hiatus)
- Orkney Tournament – Organised and hosted by Orkney underwater hockey club
- Oxford Winter Tournament – Organised and hosted by the University of Oxford underwater hockey club for student teams in the run up to student nationals
- Scotland National Octopush Tournament – Scotland's national championship
- Shamrock Cup – Organised by Irish underwater hockey but open to British teams
- Underwater hockey at Roses – varsity tournament for Lancaster University and University of York underwater hockey clubs
- Welsh Nationals – Wales's national championship

== National team ==
The BOA currently operate elite, masters, under 24s, and under 19s teams for both the men's and women's Great Britain squads. Training camps are usually held across one weekend in odd numbered months.

=== Current squad ===
Squads for the 2023 World Championships and 2024 Junior World Championships

Men's	Women's
Elite
2. Graham Fletcher; 3. Matthew Adams; 4. Rupert Ironside-Smith; 5. Nathan Archer; 6. Declan McNulty; 7. Matthew Willis (c); 8. Tom Burgess; 9. James Christen; 10. Tom Pitchforth; 11. Ali Monteath (vc); 12. James Finnimore; 13. Karol Gyba	2. Maddy Hollick; 3. Sammy Gyba; 4. Charlie Cooper; 5. Emily McKeown; 6. Lauren Dwyer (vc); 7. Rachel Hickey (c); 8. Rona Wignall; 9. Alyssa Tremlet; 10. Emma Pitchforth; 11. Katie Stephens; 12. Fiona Maynard; 13. Nia Jane Matthews
Masters
None Selected	None Selected
U-24
2. Toby Curle; 3. Will Tarling; 4. George Correy; 5. Tyreese Norville; 6. Declan McNulty (c); 7. Jackson Spry; 8. Ben Morgan; 9. JJ Hay; 10. Emrys Williams; 11. Aran Lock; 12. Caleb Pullen (vc); 13. Jake Charnock	2. Ffion Barnikel; 3. Esme Glass; 4. Jaz Russell; 5. Rebecca Fisher; 6. Ame Tarling; 7. Chloe Edwards (c); 8. Carian Lu; 9. Maddy Vasey; 10. Nieve McNulty (vc); 11. Lucy Rogers; 12. Lauren Omnet; 13. Jessica Thompson
U-19
2. Alfie Copland; 3. Mangnus Gowland; 4. Lawrence Ndadaye; 5. Oliver Herdman; 6. Henry Gilbert (c); 7. Dan Wilcock; 8. Dan Tomblin; 9. Harry Walker; 10. Harry Taylor; 11. Luke Pascoe; 12. Adam Thetford (vc); 13. Christen Vasey	2. Imogen Foale; 3. Isla Crocker; 4. Willow Neighbour; 5. Harriet Crawford; 6. Sophie Redmond (vc); 7. Linaysha Perera; 8. Amy Mears; 9. Cerys Morgan; 10. Grace Croad; 11. Tia Cockroft; 12. Lily Mae Pettifer (c); 13. Lorna Preston

=== Medal table ===
Underwater Hockey World Championships

(Note: References: For Pre-2015: For 2013: For 2011: For 2009:)	Men's Elite		Women's Elite		Men's Masters		Women's Masters		Men's U-24		Women's U-24		Men's U-19		Women's U-19		T
1st place, gold medalist(s)		0	2009, 2011	2		0		0		0		0	2002	1		0	3
2nd place, silver medalist(s)	1980, 1990	2	2013, 2018	2	1994, 1998, 2016	3	2006	1	2019	1		0	2004, 2006	2	2004, 2006	2	13
3rd place, bronze medalist(s)	1984, 2009, 2016, 2023	4	1994	1	1996, 2002, 2013	3	2013	1	2024	1	2013, 2015	2	2017, 2019	2		0	14
T	6		5		6		2		2		2		5		2		30

Underwater Hockey Intercontinental Championships

	Men's Elite		Women's Elite		Men's Masters	Women's Masters		T
1st place, gold medalist(s)		0	2025	1	0	2025	1	2
2nd place, silver medalist(s)	2025	1		0	0		0	1
3rd place, bronze medalist(s)		0		0	0		0	0
T	1		1		0	1		3

Underwater Hockey European Championships

(Note: References: For 1885: For 1993-2001 (women): For 1999: For 2008:)	Men's Elite		Women's Elite		T
1st place, gold medalist(s)	1985	1	1985, 1995, 2008, 2010	4	5
2nd place, silver medalist(s)	2008, 2017	2	1993, 2019	2	4
3rd place, bronze medalist(s)	1999, 2019	2	1997, 1999, 2001, 2017	4	6
T	5		10		15

== Tournaments hosted ==
Event	Location
1985 European Championships	Crystal Palace Aquatics Centre, London
1993 European Championships	Ponds Forge, Sheffield
2006 World Championships	Ponds Forge, Sheffield
2019 Junior World Championships	Ponds Forge, Sheffield
