= Sport in Europe =

Sporting activity in Europe

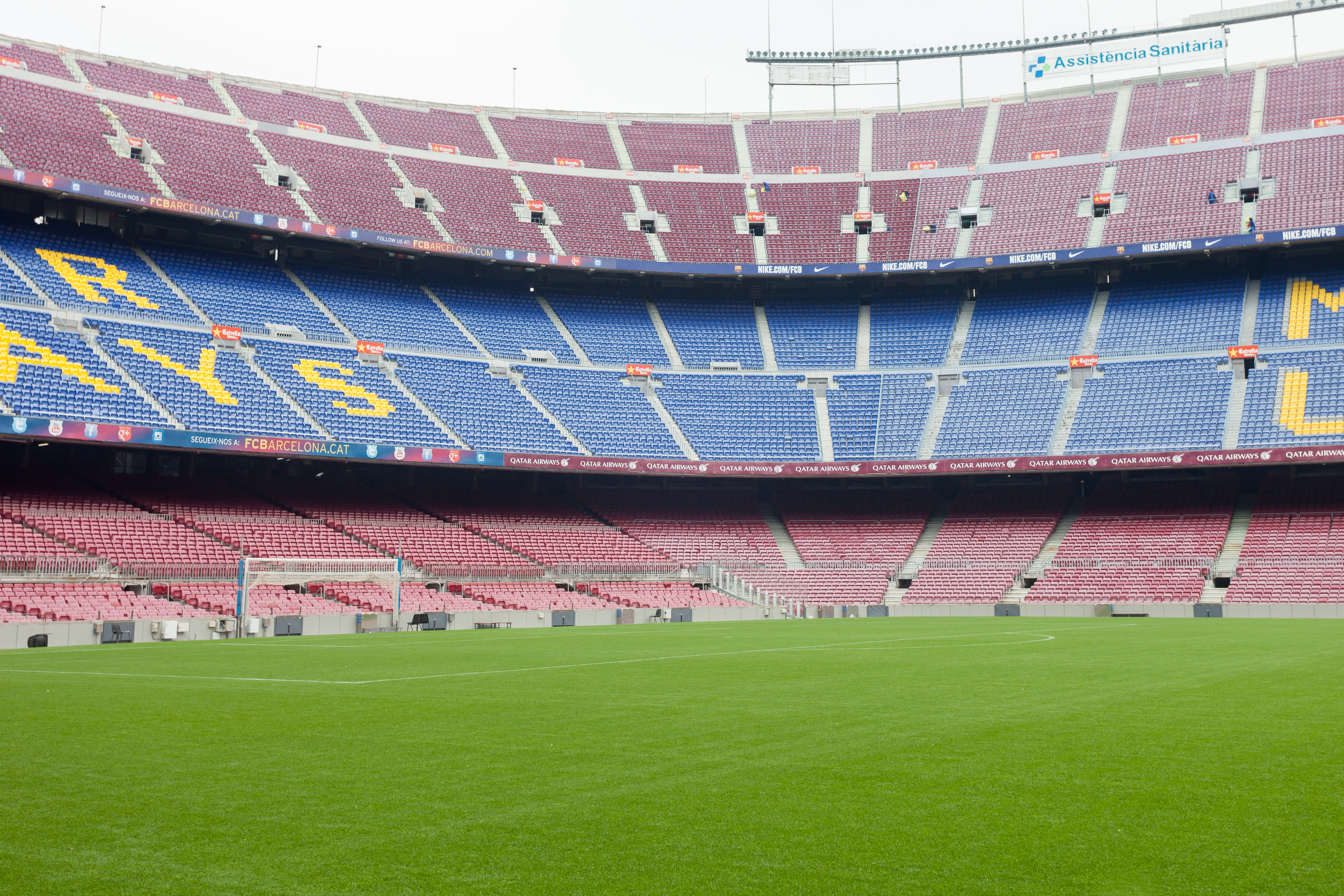
Football is by far the most popular sport in Europe. This picture shows Camp Nou in Barcelona in 2014, before the 2023 renovation works started.

Sport in Europe tends to be highly organized with many sports having professional leagues. The origins of many of the world's most popular sports today lie in the codification of many traditional games, especially in the United Kingdom. However, a paradoxical feature of European sport is the extent to which local, regional and national variations continue to exist, and even in some instances to predominate.

== Main events ==
- European Games
- European Championship
- European Para Championships
- European Championships (multi-sport event)
- European Youth Olympic Festival
- European Para Youth Games

== Region events ==
- Mediterranean Games
- Games of the Small States of Europe and Championship
- Commonwealth Games and Championship (Commonwealth of Nations)
- CIS Games (2021 CIS Games - 2023 CIS Games) (Commonwealth of Independent States)
- Island Games
- Balkan Games and Championship
- Black Sea Games and Championship
- European Union Championship
- Alpe Adriatic Championship
- Nordic (Scandinavic) Championship (Nordic)
- Baltic Championship
- Central European Championship (Central European Weightlifting Federation)
- West European Championship
- East European Championship
- South European Championship
- North European Championship
- Benelux Championship
- Eurasia Cup
- Intercontinental Cup

== Team sports ==
=== Football ===
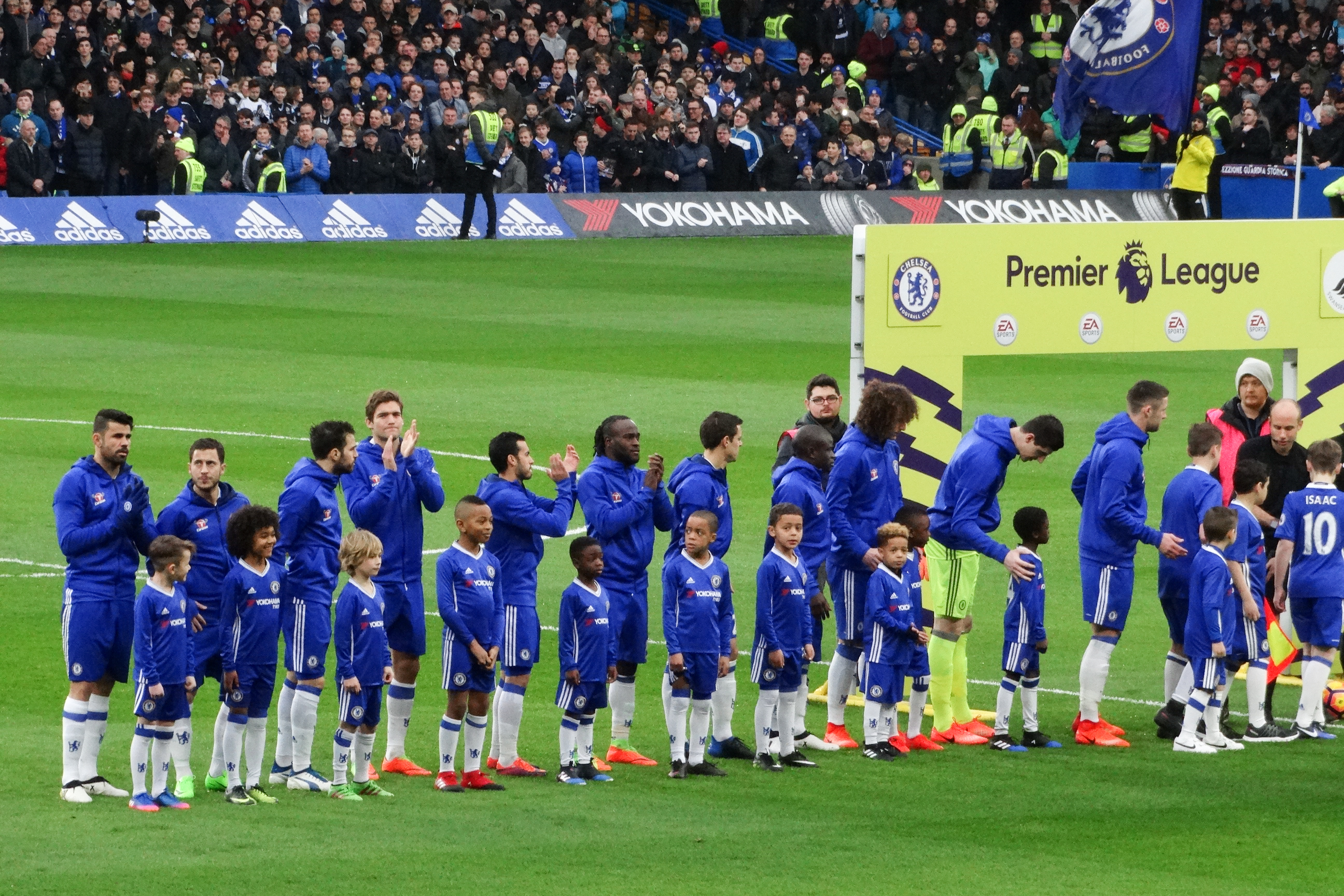
The Premier League

Football is the most popular sport in almost all countries of Europe. European national teams have won 13 of 23 editions of the FIFA World Cup. Italy and Germany have won four titles each, followed by France and Spain with two titles each and England, which won the World Cup once. UEFA, the governing body for European football, has hosted the UEFA European Championship since 1960, and the UEFA Women's Championship since 1984.

The most popular and successful football leagues are the Big Five: the English Premier League; the Spanish La Liga; the German Bundesliga; the Italian Serie A; and the French Ligue 1. Other main football leagues on the continent include the Portuguese Primeira Liga, the Dutch Eredivisie, the Russian Premier League and the Turkish Süper Lig. The top clubs in each league play the UEFA Champions League, while lower-ranked clubs compete in UEFA Europa League and the UEFA Conference League.

==== Followers ====
As of 2024, the top 10 most popular sports clubs on social media are all football clubs from Europe:

#	Club	Country	Followers
1	Real Madrid	Spain	360.5 million
2	FC Barcelona	Spain	318.8 million
3	Manchester United	United Kingdom	207 million
4	Arsenal	United Kingdom	165.2 million
5	Juventus	Italy	147.4 million
6	Manchester City	United Kingdom	139.7 million
7	Chelsea	United Kingdom	134.4 million
8	Liverpool FC	United Kingdom	131.6 million
9	Bayern München	Germany	126.5 million
10	Paris Saint-Germain	France	99.2 million

==== Attendances ====
The UEFA clubs with an average home league attendance of at least 20,000 in the 2024-25 and 2025 seasons:

#	Club	Country	Average
1	Borussia Dortmund	Germany	81,365
2	Bayern München	Germany	75,000
3	Manchester United	England	73,747
4	Real Madrid	Spain	72,701
5	AC Milan	Italy	71,544
6	Internazionale	Italy	70,129
7	Olympique de Marseille	France	63,553
8	West Ham United	England	62,464
9	AS Roma	Italy	62,435
10	Schalke	Germany	61,639
11	Tottenham Hotspur	England	61,127
12	Atlético de Madrid	Spain	60,883
13	Liverpool FC	England	60,330
14	Arsenal	England	60,251
15	VfB Stuttgart	Germany	59,265
16	Celtic	Scotland	58,903
17	Benfica	Portugal	58,746
18	Eintracht Frankfurt	Germany	57,600
19	HSV	Germany	56,324
20	Ajax	Netherlands	54,263
21	Hertha	Germany	53,191
22	Borussia Mönchengladbach	Germany	53,078
23	Manchester City	England	52,591
24	Newcastle United	England	52,187
25	Real Betis	Spain	51,542
26	Olympique lyonnais	France	50,994
27	SSC Napoli	Italy	50,989
28	1. FC Köln	Germany	49,929
29	Athletic Club	Spain	48,401
30	Rangers	Scotland	48,255
31	Paris Saint-Germain	France	47,603
32	Feyenoord	Netherlands	47,235
33	1. FC Kaiserslautern	Germany	46,348
34	FC Barcelona	Spain	46,005
35	RB Leipzig	Germany	45,045
36	Lazio	Italy	44,786
37	Valencia CF	Spain	43,042
38	Galatasaray	Turkey	43,039
39	Sporting	Portugal	42,529
40	LOSC	France	42,417
41	Aston Villa	England	42,079
42	Fortuna 95	Germany	41,488
43	Werder Bremen	Germany	41,403
44	FC Porto	Portugal	40,609
45	Sunderland AFC	England	40,425
46	Juventus	Italy	40,237
47	Chelsea	England	39,611
48	Everton	England	39,173
49	Hannover 96	Germany	38,300
50	RC Lens	France	37,936
51	1. FC Nürnberg	Germany	37,408
52	Leeds United	England	36,134
53	Zenit	Russia	35,691
54	Sevilla FC	Spain	35,574
55	PSV	Netherlands	34,338
56	SC Freiburg	Germany	34,188
57	Fenerbahçe	Turkey	33,571
58	Mainz 05	Germany	32,390
59	Brighton & Hove Albion	England	31,482
60	Leicester City	England	31,448
61	Southampton FC	England	30,865
62	Wolverhampton Wanderers	England	30,660
63	AS Saint-Étienne	France	30,288
64	FC Nantes	France	30,269
65	Nottingham Forest	England	30,059
66	Bayer Leverkusen	Germany	29,961
67	Genoa CFC	Italy	29,898
68	Real Sociedad	Spain	29,877
69	FC Augsburg	Germany	29,820
70	Ipswich Town	England	29,742
71	Twente	Netherlands	29,662
72	St. Pauli	Germany	29,506
73	Karlsruher SC	Germany	29,492
74	Derby County	England	29,018
75	Dynamo Dresden	Germany	28,991
76	Lech Poznań	Poland	28,947
77	AIK	Sweden	28,589
78	Young Boys	Switzerland	28,482
79	Beşiktaş	Turkey	28,393
80	FC København	Denmark	28,205
81	Sheffield United	England	28,087
82	Bologna FC	Italy	28,007
83	Coventry City	England	27,816
84	FC Krasnodar	Russia	27,561
85	Stade rennais	France	27,375
86	Olympiacos	Greece	26,969
87	Fulham	England	26,826
88	Sheffield Wednesday	England	26,636
89	Norwich City	England	26,316
90	Birmingham City	England	26,283
91	FC Basel	Switzerland	26,150
92	US Lecce	Italy	26,007
93	Alemannia	Germany	25,861
94	Espanyol	Spain	25,640
95	Toulouse FC	France	25,566
96	VfL Bochum	Germany	25,546
97	Middlesbrough FC	England	25,416
98	1899 Hoffenheim	Germany	25,309
99	1. FC Magdeburg	Germany	25,300
100	Crystal Palace	England	25,064
101	West Bromwich Albion	England	25,057
102	Hellas Verona	Italy	24,882
103	Legia Warszawa	Poland	24,867
104	Málaga CF	Spain	24,857
105	VfL Wolfsburg	Germany	24,596
106	OGC Nice	France	24,299
107	Hansa Rostock	Germany	24,269
108	AEK	Greece	23,943
109	Hammarby	Sweden	23,579
110	sc Heerenveen	Netherlands	23,389
111	UD Las Palmas	Spain	23,010
112	Maccabi Haifa	Israel	22,953
113	Torino FC	Italy	22,947
114	Stoke City	England	22,804
115	Atalanta	Italy	22,700
116	Club Brugge	Belgium	22,496
117	Bristol City	England	22,423
118	FC Groningen	Netherlands	22,231
119	Sampdoria	Italy	22,077
120	Hajduk Split	Croatia	22,028
121	1. FC Union	Germany	21,953
122	Udinese	Italy	21,834
123	Brøndby IF	Denmark	21,659
124	Deportivo de La Coruña	Spain	21,571
125	Celta de Vigo	Spain	21,504
126	Bolton Wanderers	England	21,325
127	Hull City	England	21,323
128	Arminia Bielefeld	Germany	21,245
129	Real Sporting	Spain	21,131
130	BTSV Eintracht	Germany	21,080
131	Palermo FC	Italy	20,730
132	Real Oviedo	Spain	20,673
133	FC Utrecht	Netherlands	20,658
134	Osasuna	Spain	20,476
135	Maccabi Tel Aviv	Israel	20,442
136	Fiorentina	Italy	20,390
137	Malmö FF	Sweden	20,273
138	Portsmouth FC	England	20,263
139	Le Havre AC	France	20,218
140	Real Racing Club	Spain	20,212

=== Basketball ===
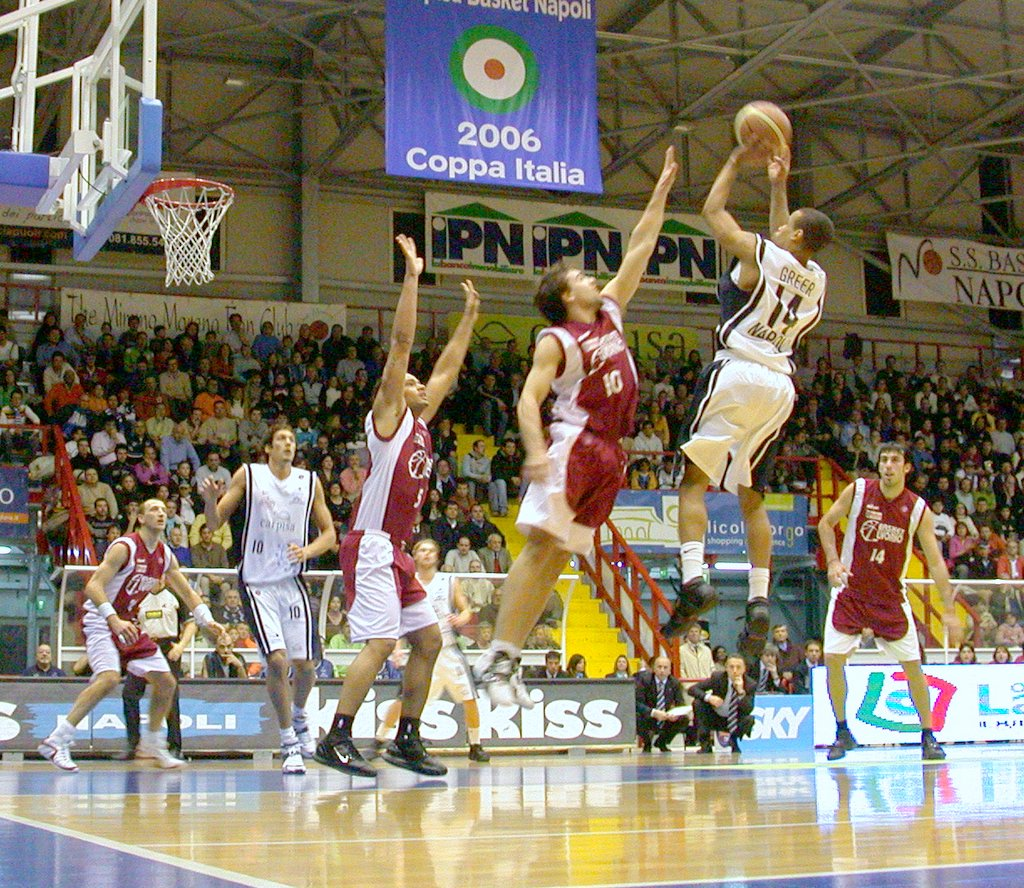
The Italian Basketball Cup

Basketball originated in America. It was invented in 1891 by Canadian James Naismith in Massachusetts. In Europe, basketball is the second most popular team sport in many countries, including Greece, Serbia, Turkey and Spain. In Lithuania, it is the national sport. It is also very popular in Italy, France, Germany, Belgium and all the ex-Yugoslavia countries.

The EuroBasket is the main European basketball competition for men's national teams, first held in 1935. The Soviet Union and Yugoslavia have won the most titles, with Spain claiming three championships since the late 2000s.

The EuroLeague is the most prestigious club basketball competition in Europe. It was founded as the FIBA European Champions Cup in 1958, but is organised by the Euroleague Basketball association since 2000. It is the second most popular basketball club competition in the world after the NBA.

==== Attendances ====
In the 2024–25 European basketball season, the following clubs recorded an average home league attendance of at least 15,000:

#	Club	Country	Average
1	Partizan Mozzart Bet	Serbia	18,486
2	Crvena zvezda Meridianbet	Serbia	18,239
3	Panathinaikos AKTOR	Greece	17,111

=== Cricket ===
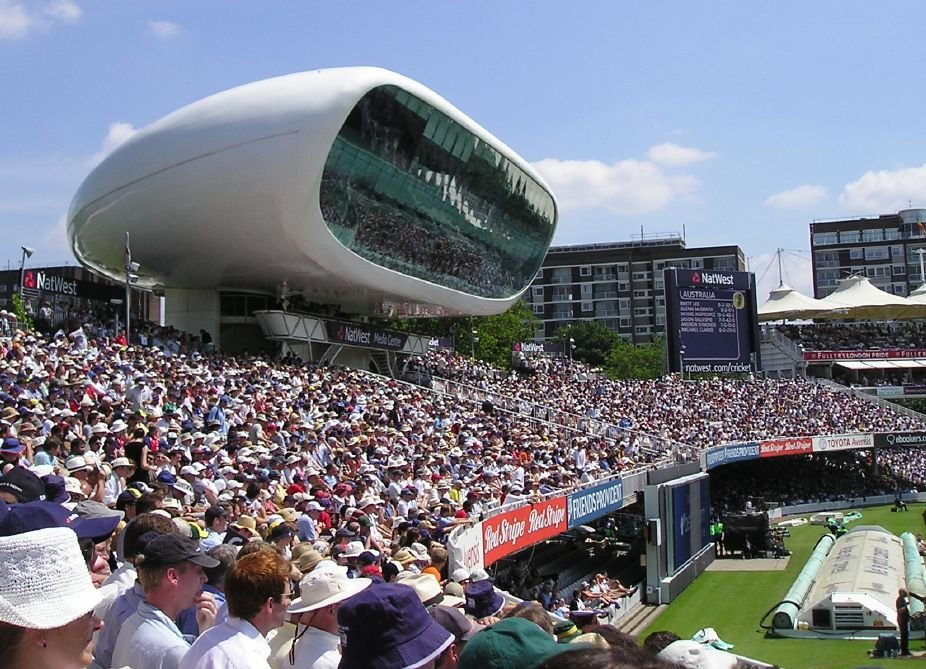
Lord's Cricket Ground is known as the "Home of Cricket".

Cricket is a popular summer sport in the United Kingdom and has been exported to other parts of the former British Empire. Cricket has its origins in south east Britain. It is popular throughout England and Wales, and parts of the Netherlands, Scotland and Ireland. Cricket is also popular in other areas and also played in Northwest Europe.

The England cricket team and Ireland cricket team are the only European teams with Test status. England's main rival is Australia, and they play each other in The Ashes series. England won the Cricket World Cup in 2019 and the ICC World Twenty20 in 2010 and 2022.

Ireland has recently received Test status in 2017. Ireland traditionally rivalled Scotland, and thereafter the Netherlands before Ireland gained full test status, while more latterly have added ongoing rivalries with Afghanistan who rose to test status with them, Zimbabwe, Pakistan (who they first hosted for test cricket) and the West Indies.

=== Field hockey ===
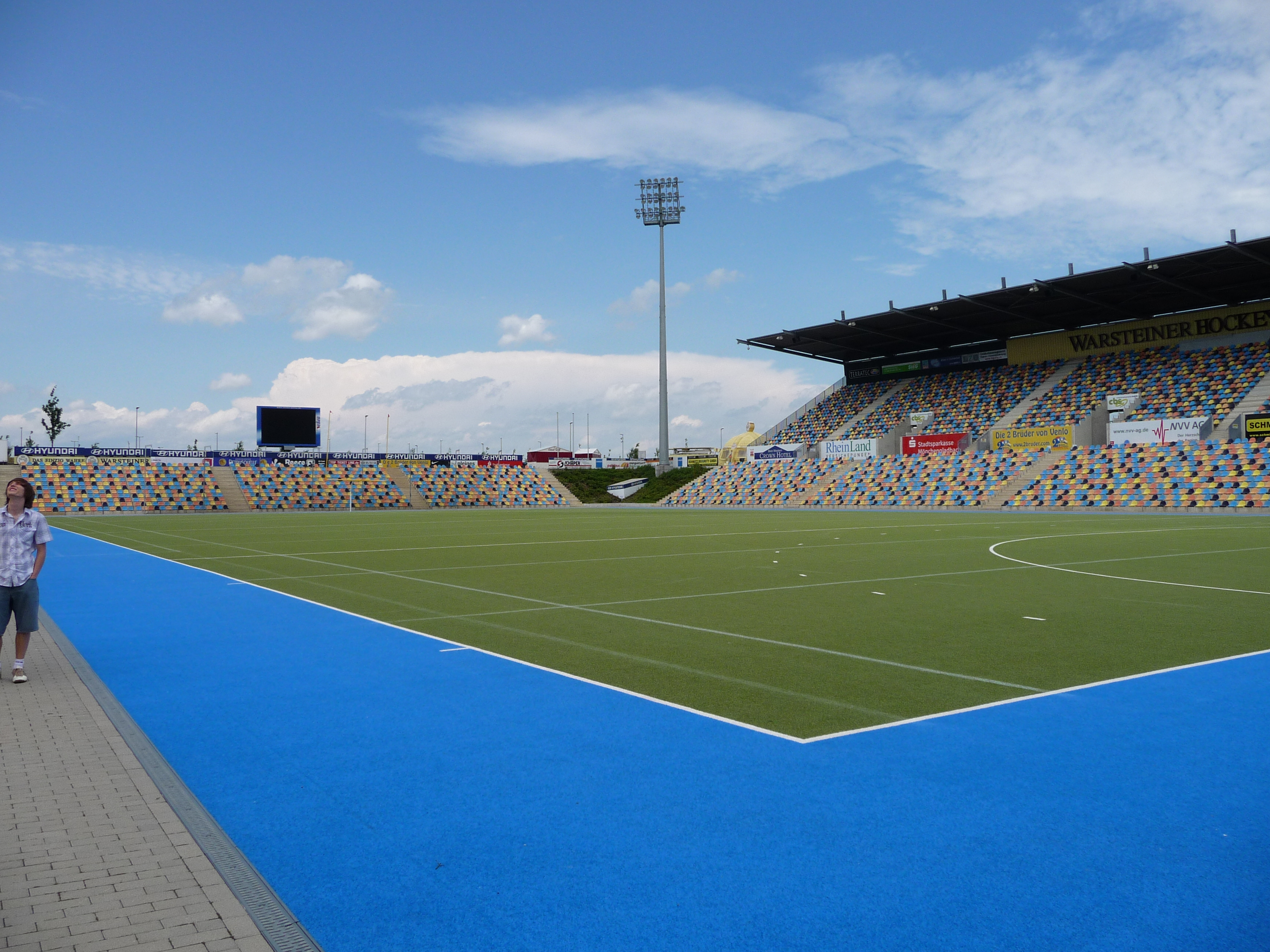
The venue which hosted the semi-final between Germany and Spain in the 2006 Hockey World Cup

Field hockey is from England and is one of the most popular sports in Western Europe, The Netherlands and Germany have been champions in both world cups, Belgium has also been champion in the men's tournament, Germany is the most recent champion in Men's Hockey World Cup and The Netherlands is the most recent champion in Women's Hockey World Cup.

In the Olympics, Great Britain, The Netherlands and Germany have been champions in both tournaments, Spain has been the winner in the 1992 Women's tournament, Belgium is the most recent winner in the Men's tournament and The Netherlands is the most recent winner in the Women's tournament.

=== Handball ===
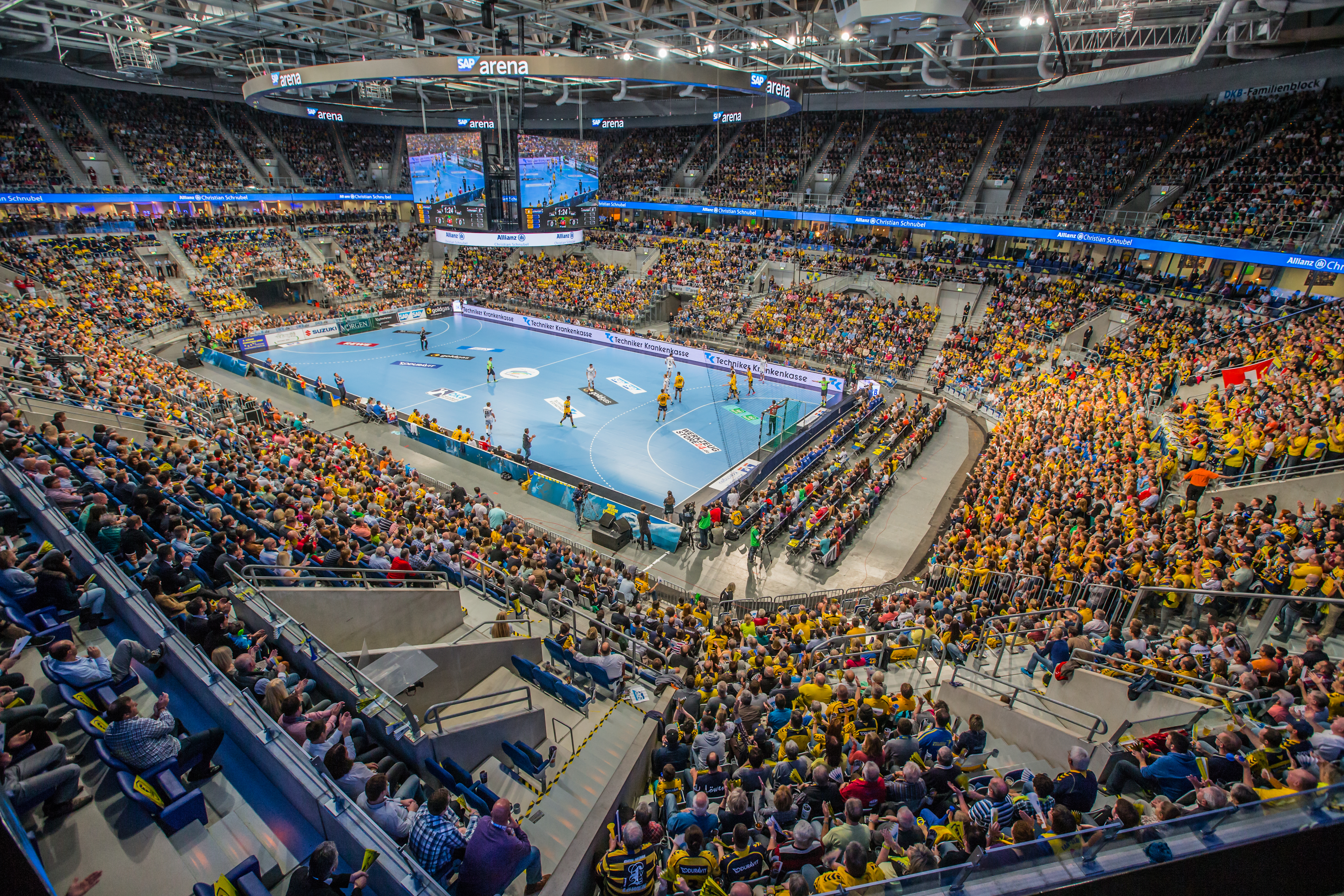
A handball game in progress at the SAP Arena in Mannheim, Germany

Handball is played professionally in many European countries. The European Handball Federation organizes continental competitions for men's and women's. European teams have dominated the IHF World Men's Handball Championship and have won all medals except one silver medal, and have also won most editions of the IHF World Women's Handball Championship. The top men's teams include France, Sweden, Denmark, Spain, Croatia and Germany. The top women's teams include Norway, Denmark and France.

The EHF Champions League and the EHF Women's Champions League is the most important handball club competitions for men's and women's teams in Europe and involves the leading teams from the top European nations. In the 21/22 season, the men's competition experienced a record viewership of 1.1 billion people across all streaming platforms around the world. While the 2024 European Championship saw more than 1 million people buying tickets to the competition.

=== Ice hockey ===
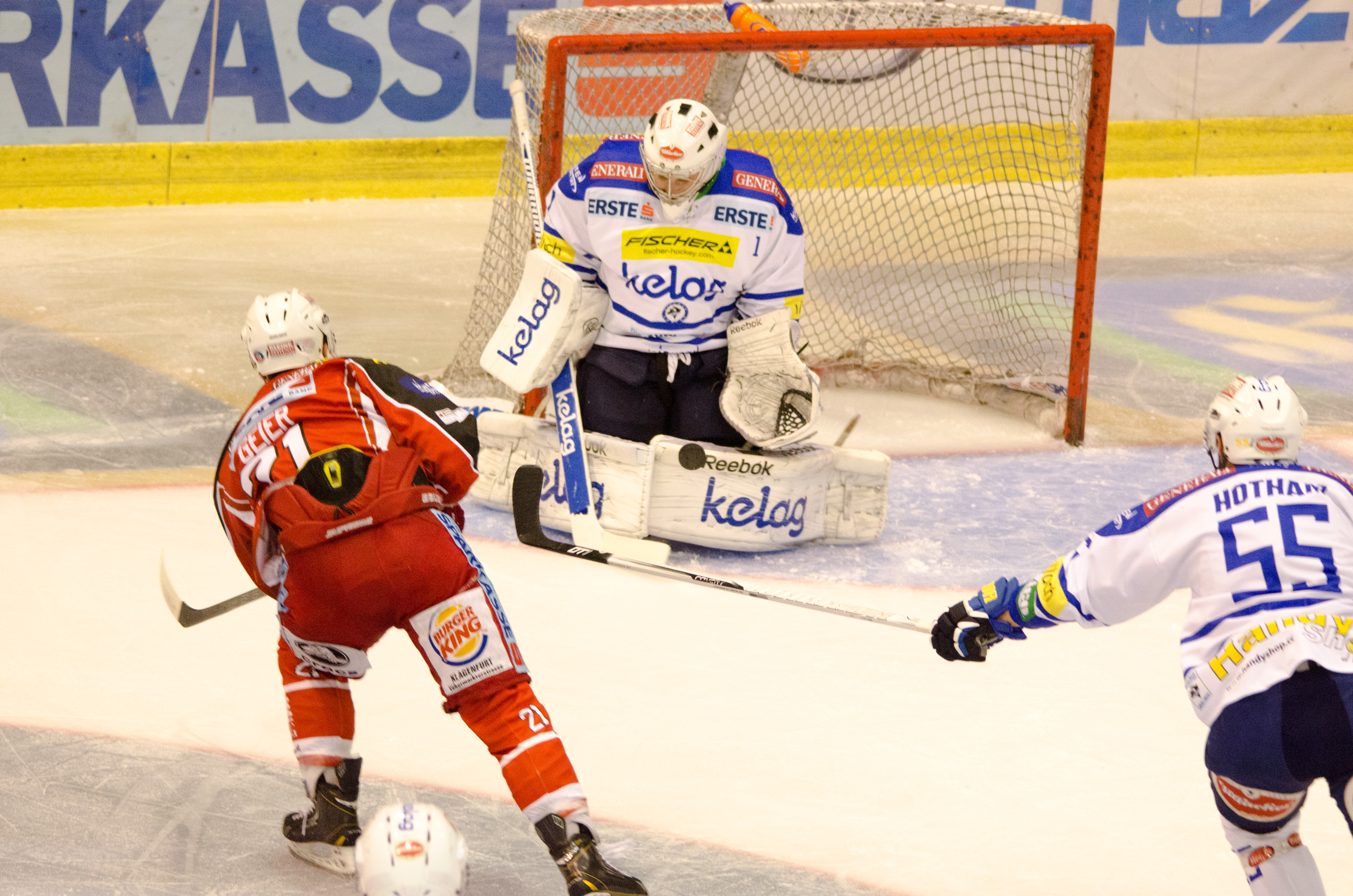
The Austrian Hockey League

Ice hockey is the most popular or one of the most popular sports in many European nations, including Czechia, Switzerland, Russia, Sweden, Finland, Slovakia, Latvia, Belarus, and northern and central Europe, where it rivals association football in popularity. It is also popular at a professional level in Germany, Norway, Austria, most of Western Europe and isolated parts of the former Soviet Union and Yugoslavia.

The Kontinental Hockey League originated from Russia but currently features teams from eight other countries. The Austrian Hockey League, Czech Extraliga, Deutsche Eishockey Liga, SM-Liiga, National League A and Swedish Hockey League are other professional leagues, whose top teams meet at the Champions Hockey League.

The Ice Hockey European Championships for national teams was played from 1910 to 1932. National teams currently play the Ice Hockey World Championships, where Russia / Soviet Union have claimed a combined 27 titles, the Czech Republic / Czechoslovakia 12 and Sweden 11.

==== Attendances ====
In the 2024–25 European ice hockey season, the following clubs recorded an average home league attendance of at least 15,000:

#	Club	Country	Average
1	Kölner Haie	Germany	17,829
2	SKA	Russia	17,648
3	SC Bern	Switzerland	15,821

=== Rugby union ===
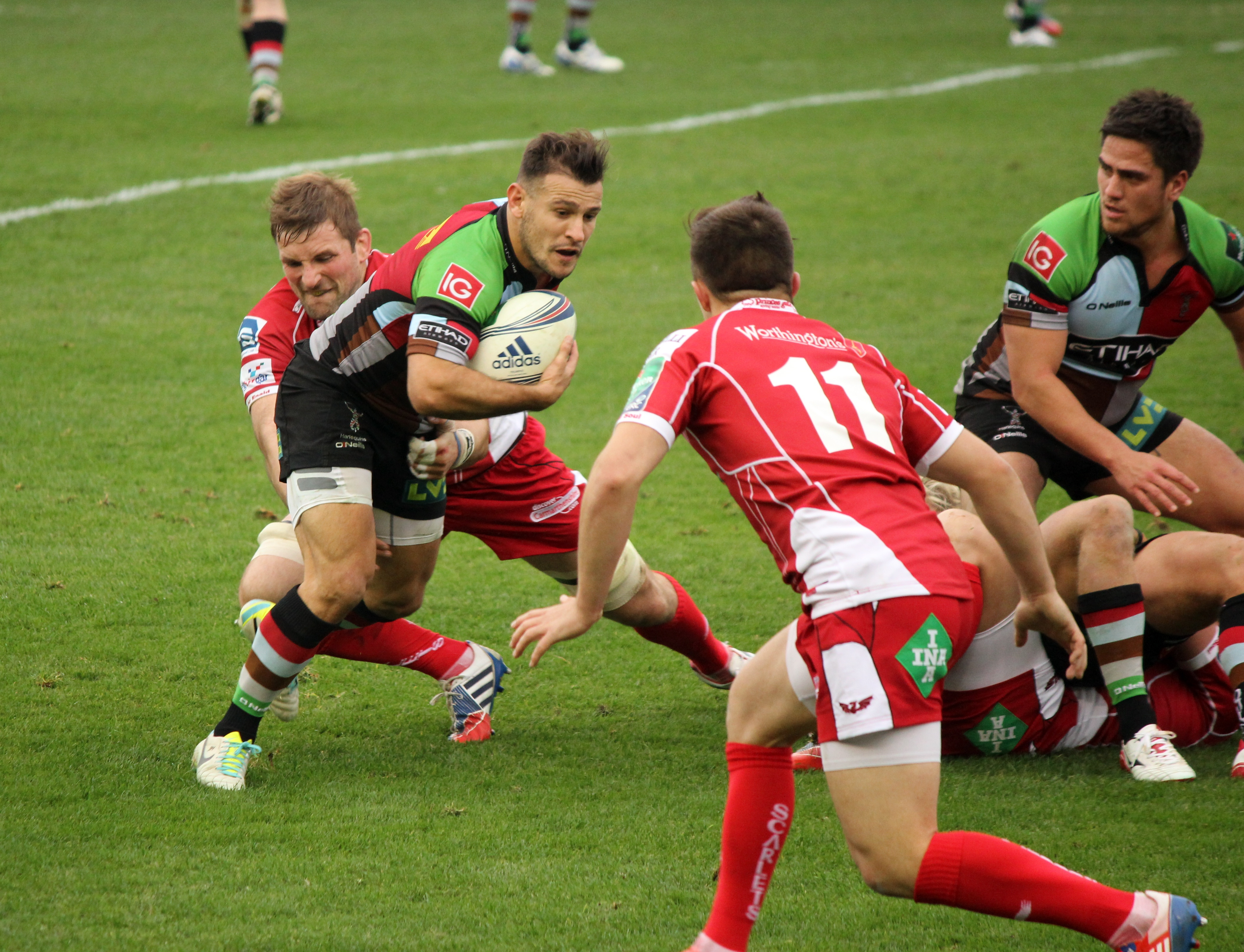
The European Rugby Cup

Rugby union is popular in France (especially the south), England, Wales, Scotland, Ireland, Italy and Georgia. The game is also relatively popular in Portugal, Spain, Netherlands, Belgium, Germany, Switzerland, Czech Republic, Russia, Poland, Moldova, Andorra and Romania, as it is at a professional level in these countries. Rugby is regarded as the national sport of Wales and Georgia, and is the strongest professional team sport in Ireland.

Europe's main competition for national teams is the Six Nations Championship, first held in 1883 as the Home Nations Championship. The other European national teams play at the Rugby Europe International Championships. The England national team is the only European team to have won the Rugby World Cup, whereas France was runner-up three times and Wales and Scotland reached the semifinals once.

The three main domestic rugby union competitions are the fully professional Premiership (England), Top 14 (France) and United Rugby Championship (URC)(Ireland, Scotland, Wales, Italy and South Africa). The European Rugby Champions Cup is the premier continental championship, with clubs qualifying from the three professional competitions. South African teams fully compete 'domestically' in Europe since 2022 when their teams, already part of the cross border URC, were given access to European competition, but compete in Southern Hemisphere competition the Rugby Championship at international level.

==== Attendances ====
In the 2024–25 European rugby union season, the following clubs recorded an average home league attendance of at least 20,000:

#	Club	Country	Average
1	Union Bordeaux Bègles	France	32,864
2	Leinster	Ireland	26,930
3	Harlequin	England	23,837
4	Stade toulousain	France	21,746

=== Rugby league ===
Rugby league is popular in northern England, where the sport formed in 1895.

The Great Britain national team first played in 1908, and entered the World Cup until 1992 and the Tri-Nations until 2006. Great Britain has won the World Cup three times, whereas France has been runner-up twice.

Clubs from England compete in the only fully professional league, the Super League, as well as the Challenge Cup competition.

==== Attendances ====
In the 2025 European rugby league season, the following clubs recorded an average home league attendance of at least 10,000:

#	Club	Country	Average
1	Wigan Warriors	England	17,088
2	Leeds Rhinos	England	14,999
3	Hull FC	England	12,159
4	St. Helens RFC	England	11,623
5	Hull KR	England	11,271
6	Warrington Wolves	England	10,404

=== Volleyball ===
European teams have won most editions of the FIVB Volleyball Men's World Championship, led by Italy with three wins. In the FIVB Volleyball Women's World Championship, the Soviet Union has won five editions, Russia two, and Italy and Serbia one each. The Soviet Union has won three men's gold medals and four women's gold medals at the Olympics.

The European Volleyball Confederation was founded in 1963, but the Men's European Volleyball Championship was first held in 1948 and the Women's European Volleyball Championship was first held in 1949, with the Soviet Union and Russia leading both in titles.

The CEV Champions League is held annually since the 1959-60 edition. Russian clubs VC CSKA Moscow and VC Zenit-Kazan won 13 and six editions respectively, while Italian clubs Modena Volley and Volley Treviso won four each. The CEV Women's Champions League is held since 1960–61. WVC Dynamo Moscow won 11 editions, Uralochka Ekaterinburg won eight, and Volley Bergamo won seven.

=== Water polo ===
Water polo is played professionally in several European countries. LEN organises continental competitions for men's and women's. European teams have dominated the World Aquatics Championships and have also won several editions of the Women's Championship.

The LEN Champions League is the most important water polo club competition for teams in Europe and involves the leading teams from the top European nations.

=== Other sports ===
Other team sports like futsal, beach Soccer, roller hockey, and American football are also popular in some European countries.

Some sport competitions features a European team gathering athletes from different European countries. These teams uses the European flag as an emblem. The most famous of these competitions are the Ryder Cup for men, and Solheim Cup for women, in golf, in both of which Europe challenge the United States. Other examples are the Laver Cup in tennis, where Europe face a World team, the Mosconi Cup in pool, the Weber Cup in bowling, the IAAF Continental Cup in athletics, and the Continental Cup of Curling.

==== American football ====
In the 2025 American football season of Europe, the following clubs recorded an average home league attendance of at least 5,000:

#	Club	Country	Average
1	Rhein Fire	Germany	10,205
2	Frankfurt Galaxy	Germany	7,098
3	Vienna Vikings	Austria	5,366
4	Munich Ravens	Germany	5,036

==== Baseball ====
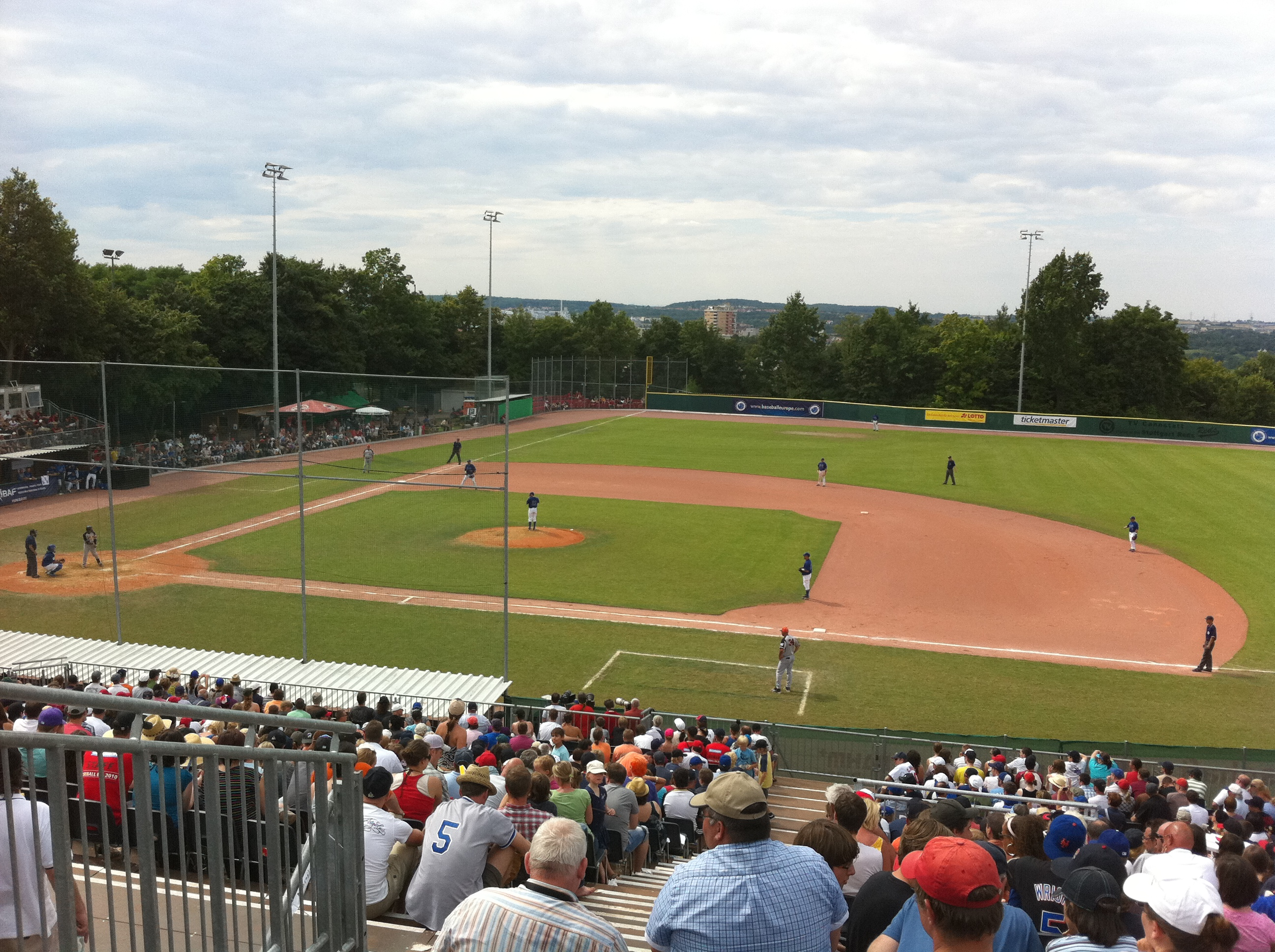
Italy vs Netherlands in 2010 European Baseball Championship final

Baseball is also gaining popularity in some countries, like in the United Kingdom, where the sport is reputed to have started in the 1800s before exploding in the United States. In Spain, due to Latin American immigrants bringing the sport, particularly from countries like Cuba, Dominican Republic, and Venezuela. In countries like Italy, Ireland, and Germany, growth in the sport is partly due to influence from Italian Americans, Irish Americans, and German Americans. Other countries include France, Netherlands, and Greece, among others.

=== Reigning European champions ===
==== National teams ====
Sport	Men			Women		
Sport	Competition	Team	Year	Competition	Team	Year
American Football	European Championship of American Football	(Austria) Austria	2025 (next in 2027)	European Championship of American Football	(Spain) Spain	2023 (next in 2025)
Association Football	Euros	(Spain) Spain	2024(next in 2028)	Euros	England	2025 (next in 2029)
Baseball / Softball	European Baseball Championship	(Netherlands) Netherlands	2025 (next in 2027)	European Softball Championship	(Italy) Italy	2025 (next in 2027)
Basketball	EuroBasket	(Germany) Germany	2025 (next in 2029)	EuroBasket	Belgium	2025 (next in 2027)
Beach Soccer	Euro Beach Soccer League	(Italy) Italy	2025 (next in 2026)	Euro Beach Soccer League	(Portugal) Portugal	2025 (next in 2026)
Field Hockey	EuroHockey Championship	(Germany) Germany	2025 (next in 2027)	EuroHockey Championship	(Netherlands) Netherlands	2025 (next in 2027)
Futsal	Futsal Euro	(Spain) Spain	2026 (next in 2030)	Futsal Euro	(Spain) Spain	2023 (next in 2027)
Handball	European Handball Championship	Denmark	2026 (next in 2028)	European Handball Championship	Norway	2024 (next in 2026)
Roller Hockey	Rink Hockey European Championship	(Portugal) Portugal	2025 (next in 2027)	Rink Hockey European Championship	(Spain) Spain	2025 (next in 2027)
Rugby League	Rugby League European Championship	France	2018 (next in TBD)	Rugby League European Championship	Wales	2022 (next in TBD)
Rugby Union	Six Nations	France	2025 (next in 2026)	Six Nations	England	2025 (next in 2026)
Underwater Hockey	UWH Euro Championships	(Turkey) Turkey	2019 (next in TBD)	UWH Euro Championships	(France) France	2019 (next in TBD)
Volleyball	EuroVolley	(Poland) Poland	2023 (next in 2026)	EuroVolley	(Turkey) Turkey	2023 (next in 2026)
Water Polo	European Water Polo Championship	(Serbia) Serbia	2026 (next in 2028)	European Water Polo Championship	Netherlands	2026 (next in 2028)

==== Clubs ====
Sport	Men			Women		
Sport	Competition	Team	Season	Competition	Team	Season
Association Football	UEFA Champions League	(France) Paris Saint-Germain	2024–25	UEFA Women's Champions League	(England) Arsenal	2024–25
Basketball	EuroLeague	(Turkey) Fenerbahçe	2024–25	EuroLeague Women	(Czech Republic) USK Praha	2024–25
Ice Hockey	Champions Hockey League	(Switzerland) ZSC Lions	2024–25	No Competition		
Rugby Union	European Rugby Champions Cup	(France) Bordeaux Bègles	2024–25	No Competition		
Volleyball	CEV Champions League	(Italy) Umbria Volley Perugia	2024–25	CEV Women's Champions League	(Italy) Imoco Volley	2024–25
American Football	European League of Football	(Germany) Stuttgart Surge	2025	No Competition		
Baseball	European Champions Cup	(Germany) Heidenheim	2025	No Competition		
Floorball	Champions Cup	(Sweden) Storvreta IBK	2025–26	Champions Cup	(Sweden) Thorengruppen	2025–26
Water Polo	European Aquatics Champions League	(Hungary) FTC-Telekom	2024–25	European Aquatics Women's Champions League	(Spain) Sant Andreu	2024–25
Handball	EHF Champions League	(Germany) Magdeburg	2024–25	Women's EHF Champions League	(Hungary) Győri ETO KC	2024–25
Field Hockey	Euro Hockey League	(Belgium) Gantoise	2024–25	Women's Euro Hockey League	(Netherlands) Den Bosch	2025
Roller Hockey	WSE Champions League	(Spain) OC Barcelos	2024–25	WSE Women's Champions League	(Spain) Palau de Plegamans	2024–25

Sport	Mixed		
Sport	Competition	Team	Season
Wheelchair rugby league	European Club Challenge	(France) Catalans Dragons	2024

== European eSports ==
Since the early beginnings of Esports, Europe has had a role in the sport's advancement in world recognition. In the early 1990s, France's Electronic Sports World Cup and Germany's Gamers Gathering together both garnered more than 2,000 participants, being just a popular as other sports competitions in the United States and South Korea. Just recently, Esports has recently become more recognized as a legitimate sporting event in Europe, marked by the formation of the European Esports Federation in 2019. Since its formation, it has grown in size to 44 member nations and is currently headed by its president, Thiago Fernandes. Today, nations like Sweden, Denmark, France, and Germany are all in the top highest earning nations in the world, each earning around $50 million.

== Individual sports ==
The European Championships is a new multi-sport event which brings together the existing European Championships of some of the continent's leading sports, including Golf, Cycling, Athletics, Aquatics, and Gymnastics, every four years. The inaugural edition in 2018 will be staged by the host cities of Glasgow, Scotland and Berlin, Germany between 2 and 12 August.

=== Cycling ===
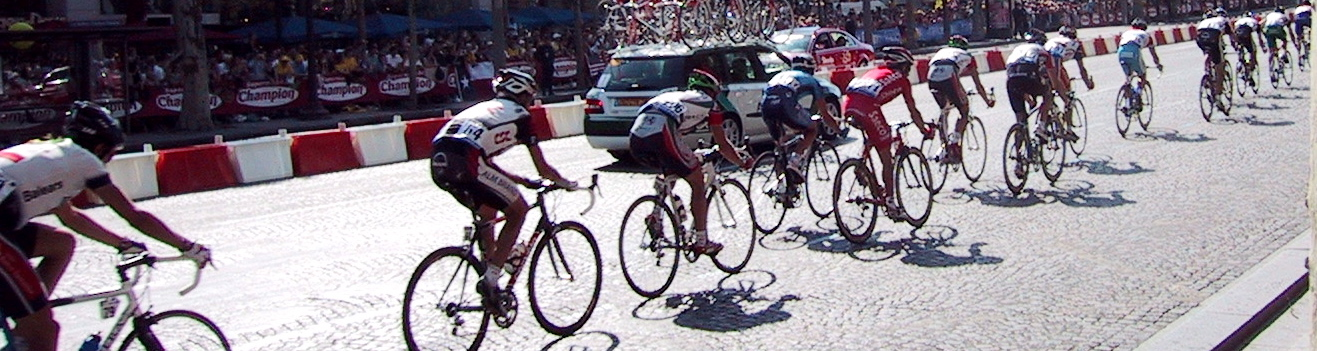
The 2004 Tour de France rides the Champs Élysées.

Road cycling is especially popular in France, Germany, Spain, Denmark, Italy, Belgium and the Netherlands. Nearly every UCI World Tour race is held in Europe, including the three Grands Tours: Tour de France, Vuelta a España and Giro d'Italia, as well as the five Monuments: Milan–San Remo, Tour of Flanders, Paris–Roubaix, Liège–Bastogne–Liège and Giro di Lombardia.

Notable road cyclists include Jacques Anquetil, Louison Bobet, Bernard Hinault, Alberto Contador, Miguel Indurain, Eddy Merckx, Gino Bartali, Alfredo Binda, Fausto Coppi, and Felice Gimondi.

=== Golf ===
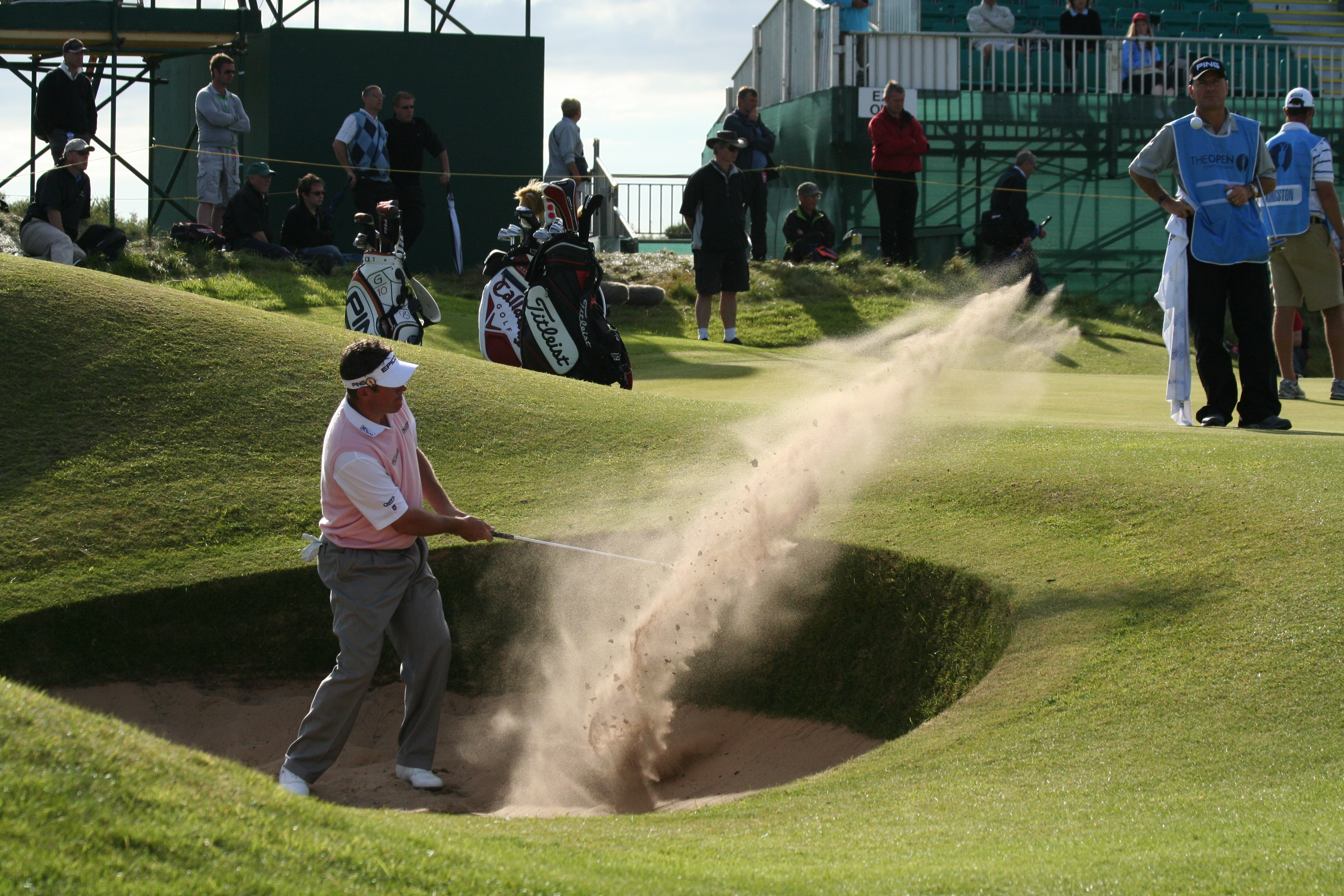
British Open Championship

The Open Championship, also known as the British Open, is one of the four major golf tournaments. Other notable golf tournaments in Europe include the BMW PGA Championship, Scottish Open, Irish Open, French Open and Italian Open, which are part of the European Tour.

Europe competes as a single team in the Ryder Cup and Solheim Cup versus the United States, and the Royal Trophy and EurAsia Cup versus Asia. Also, the Seve Trophy was played between the Great Britain and Ireland and the Continental Europe team.

Notable male golfers include Nick Faldo, Colin Montgomerie, Rory McIlroy, Pádraig Harrington, Ian Woosnam, Lee Westwood, Henrik Stenson, Bernhard Langer, Martin Kaymer, Seve Ballesteros, José María Olazábal and Miguel Ángel Jiménez. Notable female golfers include Annika Sörenstam, Laura Davies and Suzann Pettersen.

=== Motorsport ===
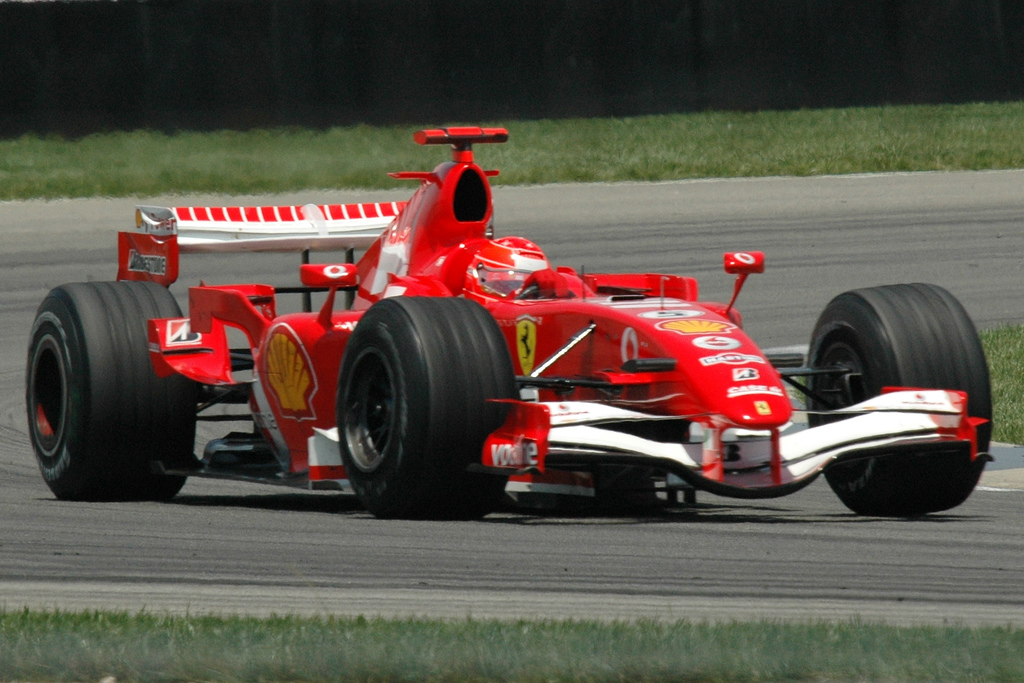
Michael Schumacher won seven Formula One drivers championships, five of them with Scuderia Ferrari.

Motorsports are popular across nearly all of Europe. The Formula One, FIA World Endurance Championship, World Touring Car Championship, World Rally Championship and World Rallycross Championship are mainly held in Europe, and are traditionally dominated by European drivers and teams. Notable automobile races include the Monaco Grand Prix, Monte Carlo Rally, 24 Hours of Le Mans, 24 Hours Nürburgring and 24 Hours Spa.

Notable racecar drivers include Jackie Stewart, Alain Prost, Michael Schumacher, Sebastian Vettel, Lewis Hamilton, Jacky Ickx, Derek Bell, Tom Kristensen and Sébastien Loeb.

Motorcycle road racing is very popular in Europe, especially in the United Kingdom, Spain and Italy. Most of the Motorcycle Grand Prix are held in Europe. Italian riders Giacomo Agostini and Valentino Rossi are the two most successful of all time, with eight and seven 500cc / MotoGP World Championships respectively. On the Isle of Man, the Isle of Man TT and other road races held in closed public roads are very popular.

Motorcycle speedway is also popular in Poland, Scandinavia, the Czech Republic and the United Kingdom.

=== Tennis ===
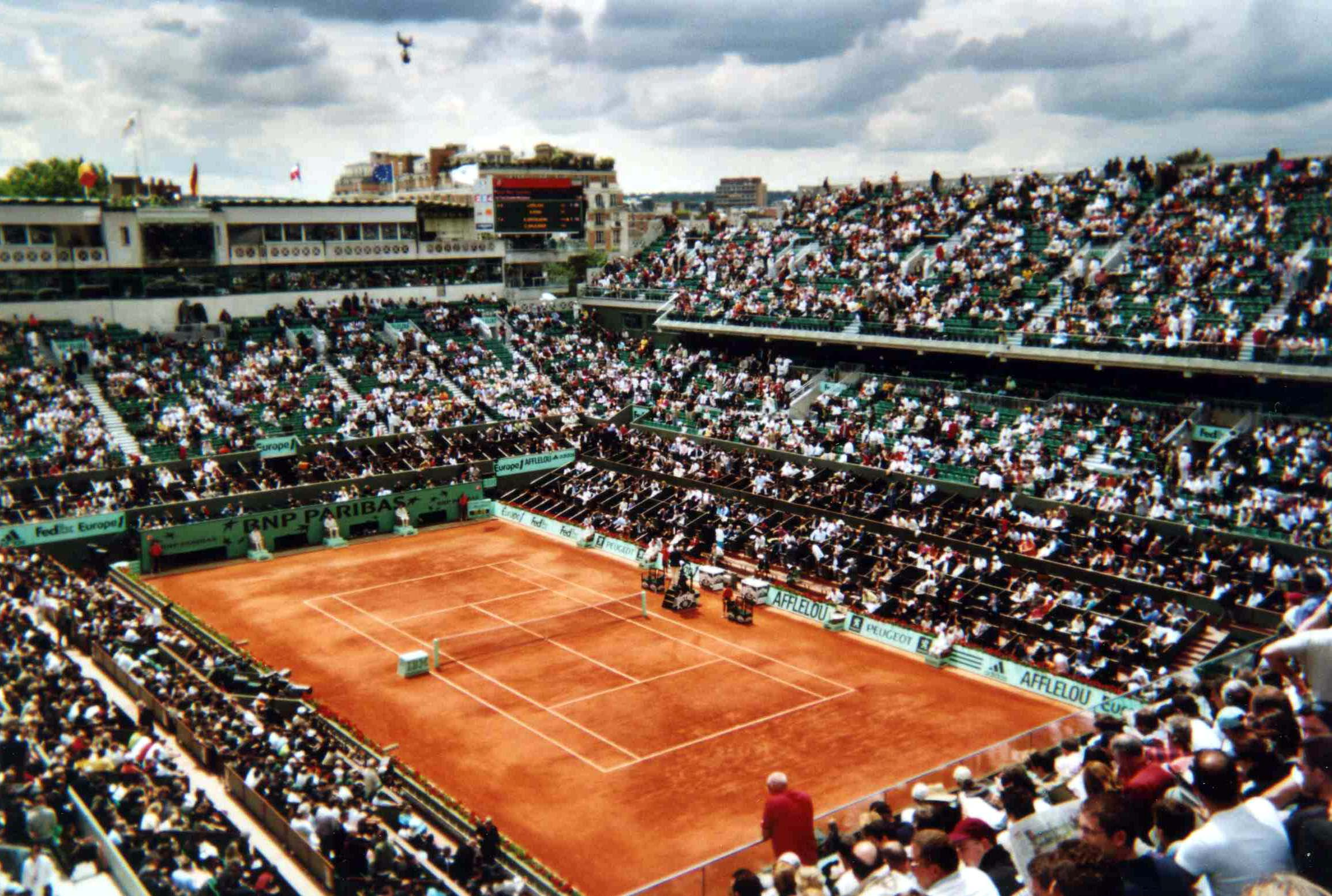
The French Open (Roland Garros) in Paris

Tennis is popular in most of Europe. Two of the four Grand Slam events are held in Europe: the Roland Garros in France and the Wimbledon Championships in the United Kingdom. The Rome Masters, Madrid Open, Italian Open and Paris Masters have ATP World Tour Masters 1000 events, whereas the Madrid Open and Italian Open are also WTA Tour Tier I events.

Notable male tennis players include Novak Djokovic, Roger Federer, Rafael Nadal, Andy Murray, Stefan Edberg, Boris Becker, Ivan Lendl and Björn Borg. Notable female tennis players include Steffi Graf, Maria Sharapova, Monica Seles, Justine Henin, Martina Hingis, Simona Halep, Ana Ivanovic, Victoria Azarenka, Caroline Wozniacki, Conchita Martínez, Angelique Kerber, Garbiñe Muguruza, Petra Kvitová, Arantxa Sánchez Vicario, and Iga Świątek.

=== Other sports ===
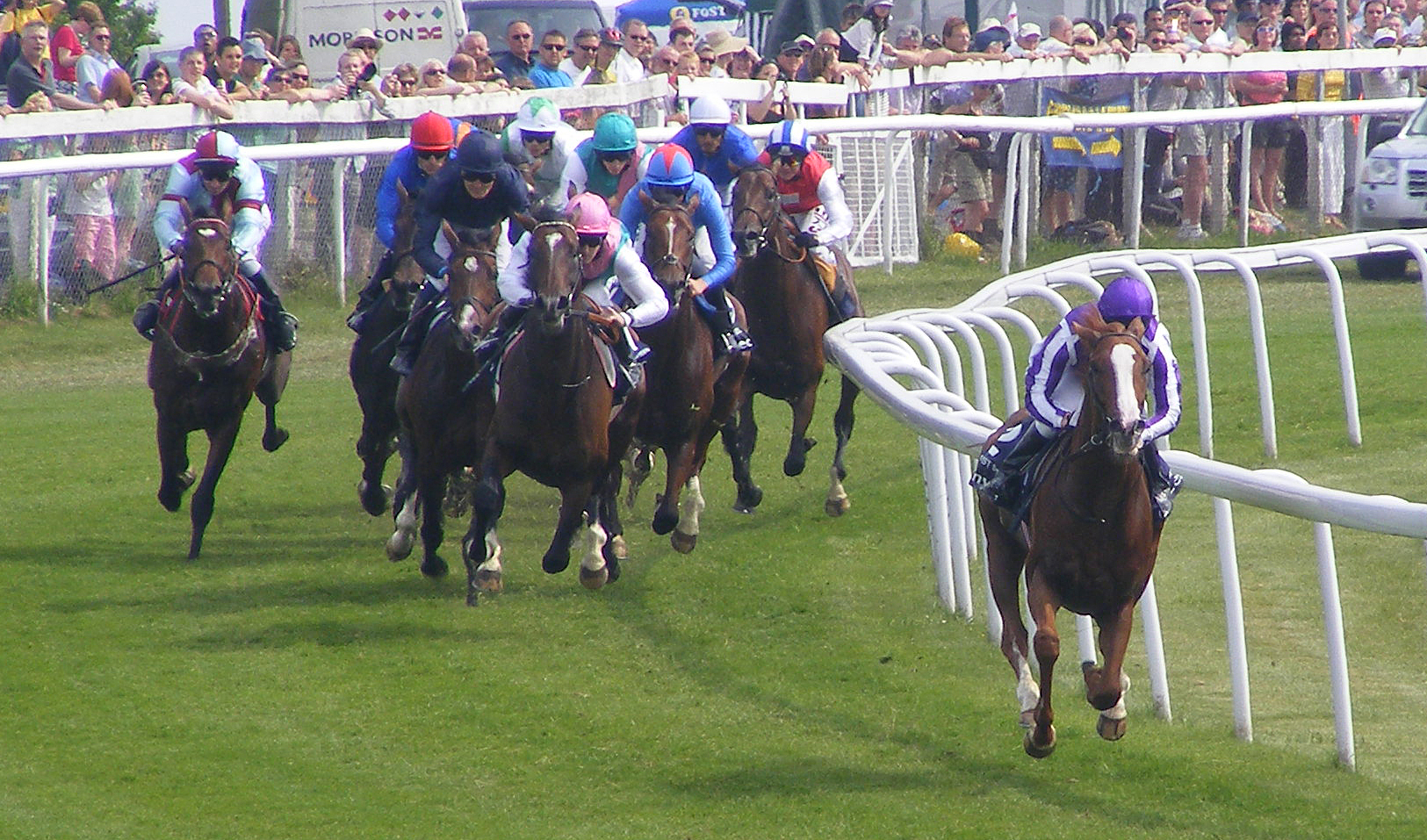
Epsom Derby

The most prestigious and lucrative athletics and aquatics meets are in Europe. The most prestigious sporting event related to athletics is the European Athletics Championships, wherein Mo Farah is the most successful individual athlete.

For those areas with the proper climate, winter sports are also an important. In Scandinavian and Alpine countries, various forms of skiing and snowboarding are popular. European competitors have traditionally dominated at the Winter Olympics and the International Ski Federation World Championships.

Horse racing is very popular in the United Kingdom and France. Major events are the Royal Ascot, Cheltenham Festival, Epsom Derby, Grand National and Prix de l'Arc de Triomphe.

Other popular individual sports include badminton, boxing, darts and snooker.

== Traditional sports ==
Some regions have games that are particular to their home, for example Gaelic games in Ireland, Calcio storico in Italy, shinty in Scotland, pétanque in southern France, bandy in Russia and Scandinavia, Basque Pelota in Basque Country, or bullfighting in Spain.

== Olympic Games ==
Europe was the birthplace of the Olympic Movement that has become so central to modern individual sport, with the International Olympic Committee founded in Switzerland in 1894 and Greece being the first country to hold the First Olympic Games. Europe has hosted a total of 30 Olympic Games (16 Summer and 14 Winter), more than any other region in the world.

During the Cold War, the Soviet Union, East Germany and other communist countries had a fierce rivalry in the Olympic Games with Western Europe and the United States. Notable events include the Blood in the Water match in 1956, the 1972 Olympic Men's Basketball Final, the Miracle on Ice in the 1980 Winter Olympics, and the 1980 and 1984 boycotts.

== See also ==
- European Championship
- European Championships (multi-sport event)
- European Games
- Nations League
- List of professional sports leagues by revenue
- Team Europe
- Sport policies of the European Union
- Directorate-General for Education and Culture
- Sport in Africa
- Sport in Asia
- Sport in Oceania
- Sport in North America
- Sport in South America
- Western sports
