= Underwater Hockey World Championships =

International event for the sport of Underwater Hockey

Tournament information
- Sport: Underwater Hockey
- Established: 1980; 46 years ago
- Format: Single round robin then playoffs

Current champion
- Elite; New Zealand (men's; 2023); Australia (women's; 2023); Masters; United States (men's; 2023); France (women's; 2023); U-24; New Zealand (men's; 2026); New Zealand (women's; 2026); U-19 (Turkey) Türkiye (men's; 2026); Colombia (women's; 2026)

The Underwater Hockey World Championship is the peak international event for the underwater sport of Underwater Hockey. The event is conducted on behalf of the Confédération Mondiale des Activités Subaquatiques (CMAS) by an affiliated national federation.

== History ==
The championship was first held in 1980 in Vancouver, British Columbia, Canada after the intended initial championship scheduled for 1979 was beset by difficulties and ultimately postponed, due to the invitation of a team from South Africa and the problems associated with apartheid.

Subsequently, a world championship has been held every two years in locations around the world up until 2006. 2006 saw many CMAS-affiliated national federations as well as the majority of the CMAS Underwater Hockey Commission members in dispute with CMAS over policy and governance matters concerning underwater hockey. Out of the divide the World Aquachallenge Association (WAA) - an alternative governing body - was born.

In 2007 CMAS intended to incorporate the Underwater Hockey World Championship into its inaugural World Games event in Bari, Italy, an ambitious event intended to showcase all of the underwater disciplines (Underwater Rugby, Finswimming etc) governed by them in one place. As far as underwater hockey goes this event was poorly attended, in part due to it being 'out of synch' with many affiliated federations' training calendars and budgets. The following year - the 'normal' world championship year - the WAA organised their 'rival' 1st World Championship event in Durban, South Africa. This is now held by many to have been the official 2008 World Championship despite it being poorly attended too, in part this time because CMAS organised a major underwater hockey 'zone' event to be held in Istanbul, Turkey on exactly the same dates meaning a majority of European federations were forced to choose which championship their representative teams attended.

The WAA was short-lived and since 2008 CMAS has once again administered all the world championship events in various age/gender divisions with the most recent Elite and Masters competition having been held in Gold Coast, Australia in 2023. World championships in the different age categories are now scheduled for every second year.

Following the 2023 resumption of the tournament following the COVID-19 pandemic, the world championships moved to being held every four years and teams would gain qualification via the new Intercontinental Championships.

== Editions summary ==
Key	Cancelled (Note: The 2020 World Championships, later moved to 2021, was cancelled due to the COVID-19 pandemic.)

Year	Date	Championship	Location	Nations	Events	Champions	Runners-up	Third place	Fourth place	Ref.
1980	July 12 – 16	1st World Championship	Vancouver, Canada	5	Men's	Netherlands	(United Kingdom) Great Britain	Australia	Canada	
1982	February 20 – 25	2nd World Championship	Brisbane, Australia	2	Men's	Australia	New Zealand	—N/a	—N/a	
1982	February 20 – 25	2nd World Championship	Brisbane, Australia	3	Women's	Australia	New Zealand	Canada	—N/a	
1984	May 1 – 10	3rd World Championship	Chicago, United States	8	Men's	Australia	Netherlands	(United Kingdom) Great Britain	United States	
1984	May 1 – 10	3rd World Championship	Chicago, United States	8	Women's	Australia	New Zealand	United States	Canada	
1986	April 16 – 27	4th World Championship	Adelaide, Australia	7	Men's	Canada	Australia	New Zealand	Netherlands	
1986	April 16 – 27	4th World Championship	Adelaide, Australia	2	Women's	Australia	New Zealand	United States	—N/a	
1988	April 5 – 13	5th World Championship	Amersfoort, Netherlands	9	Men's	Australia	Netherlands	Canada	New Zealand	
1988	April 5 – 13	5th World Championship	Amersfoort, Netherlands	9	Women's	New Zealand	United States	Australia	(United Kingdom) Great Britain	
1990	May 31 – June 9	6th World Championship	Montreal, Canada	9	Men's	Australia	(United Kingdom) Great Britain	Canada	New Zealand	
1990	May 31 – June 9	6th World Championship	Montreal, Canada	9	Women's	Australia	New Zealand	United States	(United Kingdom) Great Britain	
1992	May 12 – 20	7th World Championship	Wellington, New Zealand	9	Men's Elite	Australia	New Zealand	South Africa	(United Kingdom) Great Britain	
1992	May 12 – 20	7th World Championship	Wellington, New Zealand	9	Men's Masters	Australia	New Zealand	—N/a	—N/a	
1992	May 12 – 20	7th World Championship	Wellington, New Zealand	9	Women's	South Africa	Australia	New Zealand	(United Kingdom) Great Britain	
1994	April 17 – 24	8th World Championship	Grand Couronne, France	10	Men's Elite	Australia	South Africa	United States	France	
1994	April 17 – 24	8th World Championship	Grand Couronne, France	10	Men's Masters	South Africa	(United Kingdom) Great Britain	Australia	France	
1994	April 17 – 24	8th World Championship	Grand Couronne, France	10	Women's	Australia	South Africa	(United Kingdom) Great Britain	France	
1996	July 11 – 20	9th World Championship	Durban, South Africa	11	Men's Elite	Australia	South Africa	New Zealand	Netherlands	
1996	July 11 – 20	9th World Championship	Durban, South Africa	11	Men's Masters	South Africa	Australia	(United Kingdom) Great Britain	United States	
1996	July 11 – 20	9th World Championship	Durban, South Africa	11	Women's	South Africa	Australia	France	New Zealand	
1998	June 4 – 13	10th World Championship	San José, United States	14	Men's Elite	France	South Africa	Australia	New Zealand	
1998	June 4 – 13	10th World Championship	San José, United States	14	Men's Masters	South Africa	(United Kingdom) Great Britain	United States	Australia	
1998	June 4 – 13	10th World Championship	San José, United States	14	Women's Elite	South Africa	Australia	United States	Canada	
1998	June 4 – 13	10th World Championship	San José, United States	14	Women's Masters	South Africa	United States	(United Kingdom) Great Britain	—N/a	
2000	April 25 – 29	11th World Championship	Hobart, Australia	15	Men's Elite	Australia	France	Canada	South Africa	
2000	April 25 – 29	11th World Championship	Hobart, Australia	15	Men's Masters	Australia	South Africa	New Zealand	United States	
2000	April 25 – 29	11th World Championship	Hobart, Australia	15	Women's Elite	Australia	Canada	South Africa	United States	
2000	April 25 – 29	11th World Championship	Hobart, Australia	15	Women's Masters	South Africa	Australia	New Zealand	(United Kingdom) Great Britain	
2002	July 20 – 28	12th World Championship	Calgary, Canada	13	Men's Elite	Australia	New Zealand	France	Netherlands	
2002	July 20 – 28	12th World Championship	Calgary, Canada	13	Men's Masters	United States	South Africa	(United Kingdom) Great Britain	Canada	
2002	July 20 – 28	12th World Championship	Calgary, Canada	13	Women's Elite	Australia	Canada	South Africa	(United Kingdom) Great Britain	
2002	July 20 – 28	12th World Championship	Calgary, Canada	13	Women's Masters	South Africa	Australia	United States	(United Kingdom) Great Britain	
2002	July 20 – 28	12th World Championship	Calgary, Canada	13	Youth	(United Kingdom) Great Britain	United States	Canada	—N/a	
2004	March 22 – 31	13th World Championship	Christchurch, New Zealand	9	Men's: Elite	New Zealand	Australia	France	Netherlands	
2004	March 22 – 31	13th World Championship	Christchurch, New Zealand	9	Men's: Masters	United States	Australia	France	(United Kingdom) Great Britain	
2004	March 22 – 31	13th World Championship	Christchurch, New Zealand	9	Men's: U-19	New Zealand	(United Kingdom) Great Britain	Australia	United States	
2004	March 22 – 31	13th World Championship	Christchurch, New Zealand	9	Women's: Elite	Netherlands	New Zealand	South Africa	France	
2004	March 22 – 31	13th World Championship	Christchurch, New Zealand	9	Women's: Masters	United States	Australia	France	(United Kingdom) Great Britain	
2004	March 22 – 31	13th World Championship	Christchurch, New Zealand	9	Women's: U-19	New Zealand	(United Kingdom) Great Britain	South Africa	—N/a	
2006	August 15 – 24	14th World Championship	Sheffield, United Kingdom	17	Men's: Elite	New Zealand	Netherlands	France	Australia	
2006	August 15 – 24	14th World Championship	Sheffield, United Kingdom	17	Men's: Masters	United States	South Africa	France	(United Kingdom) Great Britain	
2006	August 15 – 24	14th World Championship	Sheffield, United Kingdom	17	Men's: U-19	New Zealand	(United Kingdom) Great Britain	France	Canada	
2006	August 15 – 24	14th World Championship	Sheffield, United Kingdom	17	Women's: Elite	Australia	South Africa	Netherlands	(United Kingdom) Great Britain	
2006	August 15 – 24	14th World Championship	Sheffield, United Kingdom	17	Women's: Masters	United States	(United Kingdom) Great Britain	Canada	—N/a	
2006	August 15 – 24	14th World Championship	Sheffield, United Kingdom	17	Women's: U-19	New Zealand	(United Kingdom) Great Britain	South Africa	—N/a	
2007	July 31 – August 4	Disputed 15th World Championship (Part of 1st CMAS Games)	Bari, Italy	6	Men's: Elite	France	Turkey	Slovenia	Spain	
2007	July 31 – August 4	Disputed 15th World Championship (Part of 1st CMAS Games)	Bari, Italy	4	Women's: Elite	France	Turkey	Spain	Belgium	
2008	April 25 – May 3	Alternative (Note: The 1st WAA World Championships is considered by some as being the legitimate 15th Championships.) 15th World Championship	Durban, South Africa	10	Men's: Elite	France	New Zealand	South Africa	Australia	
2008	April 25 – May 3	Alternative 15th World Championship	Durban, South Africa	10	Men's: Masters	South Africa	Netherlands	France	(United Kingdom) Great Britain	
2008	April 25 – May 3	Alternative 15th World Championship	Durban, South Africa	10	Men's: U-19	Spain	New Zealand	South Africa	Colombia	
2008	April 25 – May 3	Alternative 15th World Championship	Durban, South Africa	10	Women's: Elite	Australia	South Africa	Netherlands	New Zealand	
2008	April 25 – May 3	Alternative 15th World Championship	Durban, South Africa	10	Women's: U-19	New Zealand	Colombia	South Africa	Spain	
2009 (Note: Due to the 2007–08 CMAS–WAA dispute, preceded World Championships occurred on odd years until a reset implemented between 2013 and 2016.)	August 21 – 29	16th World Championship	Kranj, Slovenia	12	Men's: Elite	France	South Africa	(United Kingdom) Great Britain	Turkey	
2009	August 21 – 29	16th World Championship	Kranj, Slovenia	7	Women's: Elite	(United Kingdom) Great Britain	South Africa	France	Spain	
2011	July 9 – 16	1st Junior World Championship (Note: The 1st Age Group Worlds was not originally sanctioned by CMAS but later was later accepted.) and Masters World Championships	Dordrecht, Netherlands	5	Open: Masters	Netherlands	France	(United Kingdom) Great Britain	South Africa	
2011	July 9 – 16	1st Junior World Championship and Masters World Championships	Dordrecht, Netherlands	9	Men's: U-23	France	Spain	Colombia	South Africa	
2011	July 9 – 16	1st Junior World Championship and Masters World Championships	Dordrecht, Netherlands	9	Men's: U-19	South Africa	New Zealand	Colombia	Australia	
2011	July 9 – 16	1st Junior World Championship and Masters World Championships	Dordrecht, Netherlands	5	Women's: U-23	New Zealand	Netherlands	Colombia	(United Kingdom) Great Britain	
2011	July 9 – 16	1st Junior World Championship and Masters World Championships	Dordrecht, Netherlands	8	Women's: U-19	New Zealand	South Africa	(United Kingdom) Great Britain	Spain	
2011	August 16 – 27	17th World Championship	Coimbra, Portugal	10	Men's: Elite	Australia	South Africa	Colombia	France	
2011	August 16 – 27	17th World Championship	Coimbra, Portugal	8	Women's: Elite	(United Kingdom) Great Britain	Australia	New Zealand	France	
2013	August 23 – September 1	18th World Championship and 2nd Junior World Championship	Eger, Hungary	15	Men's: Elite	France	New Zealand	Australia	(United Kingdom) Great Britain	
2013	August 23 – September 1	18th World Championship and 2nd Junior World Championship	Eger, Hungary	9	Men's: Masters	Australia	Netherlands	(United Kingdom) Great Britain	Unknown	
2013	August 23 – September 1	18th World Championship and 2nd Junior World Championship	Eger, Hungary	16	Women's: Elite	New Zealand	(United Kingdom) Great Britain	South Africa	Australia	
2013	August 23 – September 1	18th World Championship and 2nd Junior World Championship	Eger, Hungary	6	Women's: Masters	Australia	South Africa	(United Kingdom) Great Britain	Unknown	
2013	August 23 – September 1	18th World Championship and 2nd Junior World Championship	Eger, Hungary	6	Men's: U-23	New Zealand	Australia	Colombia	France	
2013	August 23 – September 1	18th World Championship and 2nd Junior World Championship	Eger, Hungary	7	Men's: U-19	Colombia	New Zealand	France	Australia	
2013	August 23 – September 1	18th World Championship and 2nd Junior World Championship	Eger, Hungary	5	Women's: U-23	New Zealand	Colombia	(United Kingdom) Great Britain	Turkey	
2013	August 23 – September 1	18th World Championship and 2nd Junior World Championship	Eger, Hungary	4	Women's: U-19	New Zealand	Colombia	South Africa	Australia	
2015	August 6 – 15	3rd Junior World Championship	Castello de la Plana, Spain	8	Men's: U-23	Turkey	Australia	New Zealand	Colombia	
2015	August 6 – 15	3rd Junior World Championship	Castello de la Plana, Spain	10	Men's: U-19	New Zealand	France	Colombia	(United Kingdom) Great Britain	
2015	August 6 – 15	3rd Junior World Championship	Castello de la Plana, Spain	8	Women's: U-23	Colombia	Netherlands	(United Kingdom) Great Britain	Australia	
2015	August 6 – 15	3rd Junior World Championship	Castello de la Plana, Spain	8	Women's: U-19	South Africa	New Zealand	France	Colombia	
2016	March 22 – April 2	19th World Championship	Stellenbosch, South Africa	14	Men's: Elite	Australia	Turkey	(United Kingdom) Great Britain	Colombia	
2016	March 22 – April 2	19th World Championship	Stellenbosch, South Africa	13	Men's: Masters	Australia	(United Kingdom) Great Britain	France	Netherlands	
2016	March 22 – April 2	19th World Championship	Stellenbosch, South Africa	9	Women's: Elite	South Africa	New Zealand	France	Colombia	
2016	March 22 – April 2	19th World Championship	Stellenbosch, South Africa	8	Women's: Masters	Australia	South Africa	Colombia	France	
2017	July 15 – 23	4th Junior World Championship	Hobart, Australia	10	Men's: U-23	Turkey	France	Colombia	New Zealand	
2017	July 15 – 23	4th Junior World Championship	Hobart, Australia	9	Men's: U-19	France	(United Kingdom) Great Britain	New Zealand	Australia	
2017	July 15 – 23	4th Junior World Championship	Hobart, Australia	8	Women's: U-23	New Zealand	Colombia	South Africa	(United Kingdom) Great Britain	
2017	July 15 – 23	4th Junior World Championship	Hobart, Australia	7	Women's: U-19	New Zealand	Australia	South Africa	Colombia	
2018	July 18 – 28	20th World Championship	Quebec City, Canada	14	Men's: Elite	New Zealand	France	Turkey	(United Kingdom) Great Britain	
2018	July 18 – 28	20th World Championship	Quebec City, Canada	13	Men's: Masters	France	South Africa	Canada	(United Kingdom) Great Britain	
2018	July 18 – 28	20th World Championship	Quebec City, Canada	9	Women's: Elite	New Zealand	(United Kingdom) Great Britain	Colombia	South Africa	
2018	July 18 – 28	20th World Championship	Quebec City, Canada	6	Women's: Masters	France	Australia	Colombia	Canada	
2019	August 14 – 24	5th Junior World Championship	Sheffield, United Kingdom	11	Men's: U-24	Turkey	(United Kingdom) Great Britain	New Zealand	South Africa	
2019	August 14 – 24	5th Junior World Championship	Sheffield, United Kingdom	7	Men's: U-19	New Zealand	(United Kingdom) Great Britain	Spain	South Africa	
2019	August 14 – 24	5th Junior World Championship	Sheffield, United Kingdom	7	Women's: U-24	New Zealand	France	South Africa	(United Kingdom) Great Britain	
2019	August 14 – 24	5th Junior World Championship	Sheffield, United Kingdom	5	Women's: U-19	New Zealand	Colombia	France	(United Kingdom) Great Britain	
2020, moved to 2021	July 20– August 1	21st World Championship cancelled due to the COVID-19 pandemic	Gold Coast, Australia	N/A	Men's: Elite	N/A				
2020, moved to 2021	July 20– August 1	21st World Championship cancelled due to the COVID-19 pandemic	Gold Coast, Australia	N/A	Men's: Masters	N/A				
2020, moved to 2021	July 20– August 1	21st World Championship cancelled due to the COVID-19 pandemic	Gold Coast, Australia	N/A	Women's: Elite	N/A				
2020, moved to 2021	July 20– August 1	21st World Championship cancelled due to the COVID-19 pandemic	Gold Coast, Australia	N/A	Women's: Masters	N/A				
2023 (Note: Originally scheduled for 2020)	July 18 – 30	21st World Championship	Gold Coast, Australia	12	Men's: Elite	New Zealand	France	(United Kingdom) Great Britain	Turkey	
2023	July 18 – 30	21st World Championship	Gold Coast, Australia	8	Men's: Masters	United States	France	New Zealand	Australia	
2023	July 18 – 30	21st World Championship	Gold Coast, Australia	13	Women's: Elite	Australia	France	Colombia	(United Kingdom) Great Britain	
2023	July 18 – 30	21st World Championship	Gold Coast, Australia	5	Women's: Masters	France	Australia	New Zealand	United States	
2024	July 16 – 27	6th Junior World Championship	Kuala Lumpur, Malaysia	11	Men's: U-24	New Zealand	Australia	(United Kingdom) Great Britain	France	
2024	July 16 – 27	6th Junior World Championship	Kuala Lumpur, Malaysia	8	Men's: U-19	New Zealand	France	Turkey	Australia	
2024	July 16 – 27	6th Junior World Championship	Kuala Lumpur, Malaysia	9	Women's: U-24	New Zealand	France	Colombia	Turkey	
2024	July 16 – 27	6th Junior World Championship	Kuala Lumpur, Malaysia	7	Women's: U-19	Australia	France	New Zealand	Colombia	
2026	July 18 – 25	7th Junior World Championship	(Turkey) Gebze, Turkiye	10	Men's: U-24	New Zealand	South Africa	Australia	Colombia	
2026	July 18 – 25	7th Junior World Championship	(Turkey) Gebze, Turkiye	10	Men's: U-19	Turkey	Colombia	France	New Zealand	
2026	July 18 – 25	7th Junior World Championship	(Turkey) Gebze, Turkiye	9	Women's: U-24	New Zealand	Turkey	Colombia	France	
2026	July 18 – 25	7th Junior World Championship	(Turkey) Gebze, Turkiye	7	Women's: U-19	Colombia	New Zealand	France	Turkey	

== Results by nation ==
Key	Most successful in given category

Nation	Titles	Men's Elite	Women's Elite	Men's Masters	Women's Masters	Men's U-23/24	Women's U-23/24	Men's U-19	Women's U-19
New Zealand	28	4: 2004, 2006, 2018, 2023	3: 1988, 2013, 2018			3: 2013, 2024, 2026	6: 2011, 2013, 2017, 2019, 2024, 2026	5: 2004, 2006, 2015, 2019, 2024	7: 2004, 2006, 2008, (Note: WAA),2011 2013, 2017, 2019
Australia	27	11: 1982, 1984, 1988, 1990, 1992, 1994, 1996, 2000, 2002, 2011, 2016	9: 1982, 1984, 1986, 1990, 1994, 2000, 2002, 2006, 2008, 2023	4: 1992, 2000, 2013, 2016	2: 2013, 2016				1: 2024
South Africa	12		4: 1992, 1996, 1998, 2016	3: 1996, 1998, 2008	3: 1998, 2000, 2002			1: 2011	1: 2015
France	11	5: 1998, 2007, 2008, 2009, 2013	1: 2007	1: 2018	2: 2018, 2023	1: 2011		1: 2017	
United States	6			4: 2002, 2004, 2006, 2023	2: 2004, 2006				
Turkey	4					3: 2015, 2017, 2019		1: 2026	
Colombia	3						1: 2015	1: 2013	1: 2026
Great Britain	3		2: 2009, 2011					1: 2002	
Netherlands	3	1: 1980	1: 2004	1: 2011					
Canada	1	1: 1986							
Spain	1							1: 2008	

== See also ==
- Underwater Hockey European Championships
- Underwater Hockey Intercontinental Championships
- Underwater hockey at the 2019 Southeast Asian Games
