= Underwater Hockey Intercontinental Championships =

International event for the sport of Underwater Hockey

Tournament information
- Sport: Underwater Hockey
- Established: 2025; 1 year ago
- Format: Single round robin then playoffs

Current champion
- Americas; Cancelled (men's elite; 2025); Cancelled (women's elite; 2025); Cancelled (men's masters; 2025); Cancelled (women's masters; 2025); Asia-Oceania; New Zealand (men's elite; 2025); New Zealand (women's elite; 2025); New Zealand (men's masters; 2025); Australia (women's masters; 2025); Europe-Africa; Turkey (men's elite; 2025) (United Kingdom) Great Britain (women's elite; 2025); The Netherlands (men's masters; 2025) (United Kingdom) Great Britain (women's masters; 2025)

The Underwater Hockey Intercontinental Championships are a series of three underwater hockey competition for international teams played every four years. The competition acts as qualification for the World Championships, and is split into three regions – North and South America, Europe and Africa, and Asia and Oceania.

== History ==
The 2025 tournaments will be hosted in Colombia, The Netherlands, and Malaysia, and will feature Elite and Masters tournaments for both men and women.

== Editions summary ==
=== Americas ===
1st edition cancelled.

=== Asia-Oceania region ===
Year	Date	Championship	Location	Nations	Events	Champions	Runners-up	Third place	Fourth place	Ref.
2025	August 03 – 09	1st Intercontinental Championship	Kuala Lumpur, Malaysia	5	Elite Men	New Zealand	Australia	Philippines	Singapore	
2025	August 03 – 09	1st Intercontinental Championship	Kuala Lumpur, Malaysia	5	Elite Women	New Zealand	Australia	Singapore	Philippines	
2025	August 03 – 09	1st Intercontinental Championship	Kuala Lumpur, Malaysia	3	Masters Men	New Zealand	Australia	Philippines	—N/a	
2025	August 03 – 09	1st Intercontinental Championship	Kuala Lumpur, Malaysia	2	Masters Women	Australia	New Zealand	—N/a	—N/a	

=== Europe-Africa region ===
Year	Date	Championship	Location	Nations	Events	Champions	Runners-up	Third place	Fourth place	Ref.
2025	August 17 – 23	1st Intercontinental Championship	Sportboulevard Dordrecht, The Netherlands	13	Elite Men	Turkey	(United Kingdom) Great Britain	France	South Africa	
2025	August 17 – 23	1st Intercontinental Championship	Sportboulevard Dordrecht, The Netherlands	10	Elite Women	(United Kingdom) Great Britain	South Africa	France	Spain	
2025	August 17 – 23	1st Intercontinental Championship	Sportboulevard Dordrecht, The Netherlands	4	Masters Men	Netherlands	South Africa	France	(United Kingdom) Great Britain	
2025	August 17 – 23	1st Intercontinental Championship	Sportboulevard Dordrecht, The Netherlands	3	Masters Women	(United Kingdom) Great Britain	France	United States	—N/a	

== See also ==
- Underwater Hockey World Championships
- Underwater Hockey European Championships
- Underwater hockey at the 2019 Southeast Asian Games
