= 2024–25 WSE Champions League =

Tournament details
- City: Final four: Matosinhos, Portugal
- Dates: 1 November 2024 – 11 May 2025
- Teams: Group stage: 12; Total: 22 (from 6 associations)

Final positions
- Champions: OC Barcelos (2nd title)
- Runners-up: FC Porto

The 2024–25 WSE Champions League is the 60th season of Europe's premier club roller hockey tournament organized by World Skate Europe – Rink Hockey, and the third season under the WSE Champions League branding. Compared to the previous season, the qualifying tournament was reduced to a single group round, while the group stage of the tournament proper was reformulated to comprise two groups of six teams, with the top four teams advancing to the knockout stage. The winners of the quarter-finals will contest a final-four tournament, scheduled to be played in May 2025.

Sporting CP were the defending champions, having beaten UD Oliveirense 2–1 in an all-Portuguese 2023–24 final. They failed to qualify for the tournament proper, after finishing second in their qualifying round group.

== Team allocation ==
=== Association ranking ===
For the 2024–25 WSE Champions League, the associations were allocated places according to their coefficient, which takes into account the performance of each association's representative teams in European competitions between the 2018–19 and the 2022–23 seasons (except for the 2019–20 season, which was discarded due to being interrupted). The coefficient is calculated by dividing the total of points accumulated by the number of participating teams.

=== Team distribution ===
The D'Hondt method was applied to the coefficient of each association to determine the number of teams entering in each round:

Group stage (8 teams)	(Portugal) FC Porto	(Portugal) SL Benfica	(Portugal) UD Oliveirense	(Spain) FC Barcelona
Group stage (8 teams)	(Spain) CE Noia	(Spain) HC Liceo	(Italy) GSH Trissino	(France) SCRA Saint-Omer
Qualifying round (14 teams)	(Portugal) Sporting CP	(Portugal) OC Barcelos	(Portugal) AD Valongo	(Portugal) SC Tomar
Qualifying round (14 teams)	(Portugal) Riba d'Ave HC	(Spain) Reus Deportiu	(Spain) CP Voltregà	(Spain) CP Calafell
Qualifying round (14 teams)	(Italy) Follonica Hockey	(Italy) Hockey Sarzana	(France) HC Dinan Quevert	(France) La Vendéenne
Qualifying round (14 teams)	(Switzerland) RHC Diessbach	(Germany) SK Germania Herringen		

== Schedule ==
Schedule for 2024–25 WSE Champions League
Phase	Round	Draw date	Date
Qualifying round	Matchday 1	8 August 2024	1 November 2024
Qualifying round	Matchday 2	8 August 2024	2 November 2024
Qualifying round	Matchday 3	8 August 2024	3 November 2024
Group stage	Matchday 1	8 August 2024	21 November 2024
Group stage	Matchday 2	8 August 2024	28 November 2024
Group stage	Matchday 3	8 August 2024	5 December 2024
Group stage	Matchday 4	8 August 2024	12 December 2024
Group stage	Matchday 5	8 August 2024	9 January 2025
Group stage	Matchday 6	8 August 2024	16 January 2025
Group stage	Matchday 7	8 August 2024	30 January 2025
Group stage	Matchday 8	8 August 2024	6 February 2025
Group stage	Matchday 9	8 August 2024	20 February 2025
Group stage	Matchday 10	8 August 2024	27 February 2025
Quarter-finals	First leg	8 August 2024	27 March 2025
Quarter-finals	Second leg	8 August 2024	10 April 2025
Final four	Semi-finals	8 August 2024	10 May 2025
Final four	Final	8 August 2024	11 May 2025

== Qualifying round ==
A total of 14 teams competed in the qualifying round to determine the last four teams entering the group stage. They were seeded into four pots, according to their ranking, and drawn into four groups of three or four teams, with the lowest-ranked team having first choice at hosting the group matches. Teams from the same national association were allowed to be drawn into the same group.

Each team played once against the other teams in their group, for a total of three matches. The top-ranked team from each group advanced to the group stage, while the second and third placed teams were relegated to the 2024–25 WSE Cup (round of 16). The two fourth-placed teams were relegated to the 2024–25 WSE Trophy (quarter-finals).

=== Group 1 ===
Pos	Team	Pld	W	D	L	GF	GA	GD	Pts	Qualification	(Spain) REU	(Spain) VOL	(Germany) HER	(Italy) FOL
1	(Spain) Reus Deportiu	3	3	0	0	13	3	+10	9	Advance to group stage	—		4–1	5–0
2	(Spain) CP Voltregà	3	2	0	1	14	7	+7	6	Relegation to WSE Cup	2–4	—		8–1
3	(Germany) SK Germania Herringen (H)	3	1	0	2	5	9	−4	3	Relegation to WSE Cup		2–4	—	2–1
4	(Italy) Follonica Hockey	3	0	0	3	2	15	−13	0	Relegation to WSE Trophy				—

Source: World Skate Europe
(H) Hosts

=== Group 2 ===
Pos	Team	Pld	W	D	L	GF	GA	GD	Pts	Qualification	(Portugal) OCB	(Portugal) SPO	(France) VEN
1	(Portugal) OC Barcelos	2	2	0	0	11	2	+9	6	Advance to group stage	—	3–2	
2	(Portugal) Sporting CP	2	1	0	1	10	6	+4	3	Relegation to WSE Cup		—	8–3
3	(France) La Vendéenne (H)	2	0	0	2	3	16	−13	0	Relegation to WSE Cup	0–8		—

Source: World Skate Europe
(H) Hosts

=== Group 3 ===
Pos	Team	Pld	W	D	L	GF	GA	GD	Pts	Qualification	(Portugal) VAL	(Spain) CAL	(Portugal) RIB	(Switzerland) DIE
1	(Portugal) AD Valongo (H)	3	3	0	0	17	6	+11	9	Advance to group stage	—		4–2	8–1
2	(Spain) CP Calafell	3	2	0	1	15	12	+3	6	Relegation to WSE Cup	3–5	—		
3	(Portugal) Riba d'Ave HC	3	1	0	2	10	11	−1	3	Relegation to WSE Cup		4–5	—	4–2
4	(Switzerland) RHC Diessbach	3	0	0	3	6	19	−13	0	Relegation to WSE Trophy		3–7		—

Source: World Skate Europe
(H) Hosts

=== Group 4 ===
Pos	Team	Pld	W	D	L	GF	GA	GD	Pts	Qualification	(France) DIN	(Portugal) TOM	(Italy) SAR
1	(France) HC Dinan Quevert (H)	2	2	0	0	9	5	+4	6	Advance to group stage	—		6–3
2	(Portugal) SC Tomar	2	1	0	1	11	5	+6	3	Relegation to WSE Cup	2–3	—	
3	(Italy) Hockey Sarzana	2	0	0	2	5	15	−10	0	Relegation to WSE Cup		2–9	—

Source: World Skate Europe
(H) Hosts

== Group stage ==
The group stage was contested by a total of 12 teams, comprising eight pre-qualified teams plus the four winners of the qualifying round. For draw purposes, the pre-qualified teams and the qualifying round winners were separated into two pots, with half of the teams being drawn into Group A and the other half into Group B.

In each group, teams played against the other twice (home and away), for a total of ten matches. The four top-ranked teams from each group advanced to the knockout stage.

=== Group A ===
Pos	Team	Pld	W	D	L	GF	GA	GD	Pts	Qualification	(Portugal) OCB	(Spain) NOI	(Portugal) FCP	(Spain) REU	(Spain) FCB	(France) STO
1	(Portugal) OC Barcelos	10	5	5	0	32	18	+14	20	Advance to quarter-finals	—	2–2	1–1	2–1	4–4	5–2
2	(Spain) CE Noia	10	5	2	3	32	26	+6	17	Advance to quarter-finals	2–2	—	4–2	3–1	3–2	7–1
3	(Portugal) FC Porto	10	5	2	3	29	27	+2	17	Advance to quarter-finals	1–4	4–3	—	3–2	6–2	4–1
4	(Spain) Reus Deportiu	10	4	1	5	26	28	−2	13	Advance to quarter-finals	0–4	2–4	5–2	—	5–4	4–3
5	(Spain) FC Barcelona	10	3	4	3	37	32	+5	13		3–3	6–1	3–3	2–2	—	7–2
6	(France) SCRA Saint-Omer	10	1	0	9	21	46	−25	3		2–5	4–3	2–3	1–4	3–4	—

Source: World Skate Europe

=== Group B ===
Pos	Team	Pld	W	D	L	GF	GA	GD	Pts	Qualification	(Portugal) SLB	(Portugal) OLI	(Italy) TRI	(Spain) LIC	(Portugal) VAL	(France) DIN
1	(Portugal) SL Benfica	10	9	1	0	45	14	+31	28	Advance to quarter-finals	—	3–1	7–5	5–1	5–0	6–2
2	(Portugal) UD Oliveirense	10	5	3	2	32	27	+5	18	Advance to quarter-finals	1–5	—	1–1	4–2	4–3	6–2
3	(Italy) GSH Trissino	10	5	2	3	39	34	+5	17	Advance to quarter-finals	3–6	4–4	—	5–2	6–5	2–0
4	(Spain) HC Liceo	10	4	3	3	26	25	+1	15	Advance to quarter-finals	0–0	1–1	7–6	—	2–0	2–0
5	(Portugal) AD Valongo	10	1	1	8	23	38	−15	4		1–3	4–6	1–4	3–3	—	2–0
6	(France) HC Dinan Quevert	10	1	0	9	13	40	−27	3		0–5	2–4	1–3	1–6	5–4	—

Source: World Skate Europe

== Knockout stage ==
=== Quarter-finals ===
In the quarter-finals, each of the top four teams from one group play a home-and-away two-legged tie against one of the top four teams from the other group. The two best placed teams from each group host the second leg.

Team 1	Agg.	Team 2	1st leg	2nd leg
HC Liceo (Spain)	8–8 (p)	(Portugal) OC Barcelos	4–6	4–2
GSH Trissino (Italy)	5–6	(Spain) CE Noia	1–2	4–4
Reus Deportiu (Spain)	3–7	(Portugal) SL Benfica	1–2	2–5
FC Porto (Portugal)	5–2	(Portugal) UD Oliveirense	4–2	1–0

Matches

27 March 2025
20:30 CET (UTC+1)

HC Liceo (Spain)	4–6	(Portugal) OC Barcelos
	Report

Pazo dos Deportes de Riazor, A Coruña
Referee: Ulderico Barbarisi, Massimiliano Carmazzi (Italy)
3 April 2025
WET (UTC+0)

OC Barcelos (Portugal)	2–4	(Spain) HC Liceo
	Report
Penalties
	1–0

Pavilhão Municipal de Barcelos, Barcelos
Referee: Joseph Silecchia, Simone Brambilla (Italy)

8–8 on aggregate after overtime; OC Barcelos won 1–0 on penalties.

27 March 2025
20:45 CET (UTC+1)

GSH Trissino (Italy)	1–2	(Spain) CE Noia
	Report

PalaDante, Trissino
Referee: Rui Leitão, Fernando Vasconcelos (Portugal)
3 April 2025
CET (UTC+1)

CE Noia (Spain)	4–4	(Italy) GSH Trissino
	Report

Pavelló Olimpic de l'Ateneu Agrícola, Sant Sadurni d'Anoia
Referee: Joaquim Pinto, Pedro Figueiredo (Portugal)

CE Noia won 6–5 on aggregate.

27 March 2025
20:45 CET (UTC+1)

Reus Deportiu (Spain)	1–2	(Portugal) SL Benfica
	Report

Pavelló del Reus Deportiu, Reus
Referee: Franco Ferrari, Joseph Silecchia (Italy)
3 April 2025
WET (UTC+0)

SL Benfica (Portugal)	5–2	(Spain) Reus Deportiu
	Report

Pavilhão Fidelidade, Lisbon
Referee: Filippo Fronte, Marco Rondina (Italy)

SL Benfica won 7–3 on aggregate.

27 March 2025
20:00 WET (UTC+0)

FC Porto (Portugal)	4–2	(Portugal) UD Oliveirense
	Report

Dragão Arena, Porto
Referee: Ivan González, Miguel Diaz (Spain)
3 April 2025
WET (UTC+0)

UD Oliveirense (Portugal)	0–1	(Portugal) FC Porto
	Report

Pavilhão Dr. Salvador Machado, Oliveira de Azeméis
Referee: Ruben Fernández, Gabriel Villar (Spain)

FC Porto won 5–2 on aggregate.

=== Final-four ===
The semi-finals and final were contested as a final-four tournament, which was played on 10 and 11 May 2025 at the Centro de Desportos e Congressos in Matosinhos, Portugal.

Semi-finals
10 May
(Portugal) OC Barcelos	3
(Spain) CE Noia	1
10 May
(Portugal) SL Benfica	2
(Portugal) FC Porto (a.e.t.)	3

Final
11 May
(Portugal) OC Barcelos (p)	1 (2)
(Portugal) FC Porto	1 (0)

==== Semi-finals ====
10 May 2025
15:30 WEST (UTC+1)

OC Barcelos (Portugal)	3–1	(Spain) CE Noia
	Report

Centro de Desportos e Congressos, Matosinhos
Referee: Filippo Fronte, Marco Rondina (Italy)

10 May 2025
12:00 WEST (UTC+1)

SL Benfica (Portugal)	2–3 (a.e.t.)	(Portugal) FC Porto
	Report

Centro de Desportos e Congressos, Matosinhos
Referee: Ruben Fernandez, Daniel Villar (Spain)

==== Final ====
11 May 2025
16:00 WEST (UTC+1)

OC Barcelos (Portugal)	1–1	(Portugal) FC Porto
	Report
Penalties
	2–0

Centro de Desportos e Congressos, Matosinhos
Referee: Ruben Fernandez, Daniel Villar (Spain)
