= Underwater Hockey European Championships =

International event for the sport of Underwater Hockey

Tournament information
- Sport: Underwater Hockey
- Established: 1985
- Defunct: 2019

Final champion
- Turkey (men's); France (women's)

The Underwater Hockey European Championships is a biennial tournament in underwater hockey organised by the sports global governing body Confédération Mondiale des Activités Subaquatiques (CMAS). The first event was held in the United Kingdom in 1985.

In 2023, the World Championships moved to a four-year cycle and a new Underwater Hockey Intercontinental Championships were added to the calendar as a qualification event, effectively replacing the European Championships.

== Events summary ==
Year	Date	Championship	Location	Nations	Events	Champions
1985	? – ? June	1st European Championship	London, United Kingdom	?	Men's	(United Kingdom) Great Britain
1985	? – ? June	1st European Championship	London, United Kingdom	?	Women's	(United Kingdom) Great Britain
1987	?	2nd European Championship	???, Netherlands	?	Men's	?
1987	?	2nd European Championship	???, Netherlands	?	Women's	?
1989	?	3rd European Championship	???, France	?	Men's	?
1989	?	3rd European Championship	???, France	?	Women's	?
1991	?	4th European Championship	?	?	Men's	?
1991	?	4th European Championship	?	?	Women's	?
1993	?	5th European Championship	Sheffield, United Kingdom	?	Men's	?
1993	?	5th European Championship	Sheffield, United Kingdom	?	Women's	?
1995	?	6th European Championship	Amersfoort, Netherlands	?	Men's	?
1995	?	6th European Championship	Amersfoort, Netherlands	?	Women's	(United Kingdom) Great Britain
1997	?	7th European Championship	Reims, France	?	Men's	?
1997	?	7th European Championship	Reims, France	?	Women's	?
1999	21 – 26 June	8th European Championship	Kranj, Slovenia	8	Men's	Netherlands
1999	21 – 26 June	8th European Championship	Kranj, Slovenia	6	Women's	Netherlands
2001	?	9th European Championship	Belgrade, Serbia	?	Men's	?
2001	?	9th European Championship	Belgrade, Serbia	?	Women's	?
2003	?	10th European Championship	San Marino, San Marino	?	Men's	?
2003	?	10th European Championship	San Marino, San Marino	?	Women's	?
2005	? May – ? June	11th European Championship	Marseille, France	?	Men's	?
2005	? May – ? June	11th European Championship	Marseille, France	?	Women's	France
2008	? May – ? June	12th European Championship	Istanbul, Turkey	8	Men's	Turkey
2008	? May – ? June	12th European Championship	Istanbul, Turkey	7	Women's	(United Kingdom) Great Britain
2010	16 – 24 April	13th European Championship	Porto, Portugal	10	Men's	France
2010	16 – 24 April	13th European Championship	Porto, Portugal	7	Women's	(United Kingdom) Great Britain
2015	30 March – 3 April	14th European Championship	Porto, Portugal	Did not occur		
2015	18 – 22 November	14th European Championship	Çanakkale, Turkey	Did not occur		
2017	21 – 29 August	15th European Championship	Eger, Hungary	8	Men's	Turkey
2017	21 – 29 August	15th European Championship	Eger, Hungary	8	Women's	France
2019	27 July – 4 August	16th European Championship	Castellón de la Plana, Spain	6	Men's	Turkey
2019	27 July – 4 August	16th European Championship	Castellón de la Plana, Spain	4	Women's	France

== See also ==
- Underwater Hockey World Championships
- Underwater Hockey Intercontinental Championships
- Underwater hockey at the 2019 Southeast Asian Games
