= 2024 Euro Beach Soccer League =

Tournament details
- Host countries: Italy; Georgia; Moldova; Portugal
- Dates: 3 July – 15 September
- Teams: 26 (from 2 confederations)
- Venues: 5 (in 5 host cities)

Final positions
- Champions: Portugal (9th title)
- Runners-up: Italy
- Third place: Belarus
- Fourth place: Spain

Tournament statistics
- Matches played: 79
- Goals scored: 603 (7.63 per match)

The 2024 Euro Beach Soccer League was the 27th edition of the Euro Beach Soccer League (EBSL), the annual, premier competition in European beach soccer contested between men's national teams. It was organised by Beach Soccer Worldwide (BSWW) and the Italian Football Federation (FIGC).

This season, the competing teams continued to take part in two divisions: the top tier (Division A) and the bottom tier (Division B).

Italy were the defending champions but lost in the final to Portugal, the latter claiming their ninth EBSL title.

== Calendar and locations ==
Georgia hosted an EBSL stage for the first time.

Phase	Dates	Country	City	Stage	Divisions		Ref.
Regular season	3–7 July	Italy	Tirrenia	Stage 1	A	B	
Regular season	17–21 July	Georgia	Batumi	Stage 2		B	
Regular season	26–28 July	Moldova	Chișinău	Stage 3	A		
Regular season	30 August – 1 September	Portugal	Nazaré	Stage 4	A		
Play-offs	10–15 September	Italy	Alghero	Superfinal	A		

== Stage 1 (Tirrenia, 3–7 July) ==
Matches are listed as local time in Tirrenia, CEST (UTC+2) and are those scheduled; actual kick-off times may somewhat differ.

All matches took place at the permanent beach sports arena comprising part of the Tirrenia Olympic Preparation Centre.

England were originally due to take part in the Division B competition but ultimately did not fulfil their fixtures due to undisclosed reasons.

=== Division A ===
==== Group stage ====
Key: Advance to –	1st–4th place semifinals /	5th–8th place semifinals /	(H) Hosts

===== Group 1 =====
Pos	Team	Pld	W	W+	WP	L	GF	GA	GD	Pts
1	Italy (H)	3	2	0	0	1	18	6	+12	6
2	Denmark	3	2	0	0	1	11	6	+5	6
3	Estonia	3	1	0	1	1	13	14	–1	4
4	Czechia	3	0	0	0	3	4	20	−16	0

3 July 2024	Czechia	1–4	Denmark
17:00	Radosta 21'	Report	Frandsen 2'; Wegeberg 3'; Wagner 4'; Damm 30'	Referee: Raffaele Delvecchio (San Marino)

3 July 2024	Estonia	5–5 (a.e.t.) (5–3 p)	Italy
19:00	Er. Stüf 11', 34'; Kotter 16'; Lepik 22' (pen.), 37' (e.t.)	Report	Remedi 3'; Bertacca 12'; Josep Jr. 29' (pen.); Zurlo 31'; Carpita 38' (e.t.)	Referee: Matthieu Dor (France)
	Penalties
	Munskind (penalty scored); Er. Stüf (penalty scored); Lepik (penalty scored); Kigaste (penalty scored); Marmor (penalty scored)		(penalty scored) Bertacca; (penalty scored) Josep Jr.; (penalty missed) Alla; (penalty scored) Augusto

4 July 2024	Italy	10–0	Czechia
15:00	Augusto 4'; Genovali 7'; Bertacca 7', 8'; Zurlo 9'; Sassari 11', 21'; Remedi 26', 35'; Alla 35'	Report		Referee: Laurynas Arzuolaitis (Lithuania)

4 July 2024	Denmark	6–2	Estonia
21:00	C. Jørgensen 4'; O. Jørgensen 12'; Wagner 16'; Damm 21'; Thomson 29' (o.g.); Schmidt 36'	Report	Nõmmiko 18'; Alaväli 26'	Referee: Tomáš Nejedlý (Czech Republic)

5 July 2024	Czechia	3–6	Estonia
16:00	Körtvelyesi 29'; Valeš 31'; Klíma 3'	Report	Lepik 4', 28'; Kotter 15'; Kigaste 20'; Alaväli 21'; Nõmmiko 29'	Referee: Raffaele Delvecchio (San Marino)

5 July 2024	Italy	3–1	Denmark
18:00	Zurlo 8'; Alla 19'; Genovali 24'	Report	Madsen 23'	Referee: Sergio Romero (Switzerland)

===== Group 2 =====
Pos	Team	Pld	W	W+	WP	L	GF	GA	GD	Pts
1	Switzerland	3	3	0	0	0	19	7	+12	9
2	Romania	3	2	0	0	1	10	14	−4	6
3	France	3	1	0	0	2	10	10	0	3
4	Lithuania	3	0	0	0	3	5	13	−8	0

3 July 2024	Switzerland	9–3	Romania
15:00	Eliott 10'; Naeg 11' (o.g.); Ott 16', 30'; Stankovic 21', 36'; Knöpfli 28'; Hodel 29'; Ariel 30'	Report	Măci 7', 32'; Zamfir 30'	Referee: Laurynas Arzuolaitis (Lithuania)

3 July 2024	Lithuania	2–4	France
21:00	Makutunovičius 5'; Plytnikas 6'	Report	Jacquemin 2'; Santos Diaz 5'; Constant 11'; Fayos 36'	Referee: Moreno Longo (Italy)

4 July 2024	Romania	3–2	Lithuania
17:00	Zamfir 12' (pen.); Zaharia 28'; Naeg 35'	Report	Novičkov 5'; Graičiūnas 32'	Referee: Georgios Fitsas (Greece)

4 July 2024	France	3–4	Switzerland
19:00	Constant 5'; Tillet 13'; Varrel 27'	Report	Eliott 25'; Ott 28', 33'; Steinemann 30'	Referee: Saverio Bottalico (Italy)

5 July 2024	Lithuania	1–6	Switzerland
14:00	Navickas 36'	Report	Steinemann 3'; Ott 3' (pen.), 20'; Stankovic 14', 32'; Gmür 17'	Referee: Andrei Karhu (Estonia)

5 July 2024	Romania	4–3	France
20:00	Bolat 17'; Măci 19', 23', 36'	Report	Fayos 2'; Varrel 10'; Drouillet 18'	Referee: Luca Romani (Italy)

==== Knockout stage ====
===== Semifinals =====
6 July 2024 5th–8th place	Estonia	2–1	Lithuania
12:00	Thomson 10'; Lepik 24'	Report	Plytnikas 31'	Referee: Luca Romani (Italy)

6 July 2024	Czechia	1–3	France
14:30	Trampota 31'	Report	Varrel 3', 25'; Constant 27'	Referee: Laurynas Arzuolaitis (Lithuania)

6 July 2024 1st–4th place	Denmark	3–4	Switzerland
16:30	Damm 22'; C. Jørgensen 27'; Hoedeman 31'	Report	Hodel 2', 9'; Ott 11'; Kessler 23'	Referee: Moreno Longo (Switzerland)

6 July 2024	Italy	11–3	Romania
19:30	Bertacca 1', 25'; Zurlo 6'; Casapieri 17'; Alla 19'; Remedi 20', 32'; Josep Jr. 21'; Sciacca 30', 36'; Genovali 35'	Report	Andrescu 22'; Zaharia 23', 30'	Referee: Matthieu Dor (France)

===== Finals =====
7 July 2024 7th place match	Lithuania	1–3	Czechia
11:00	Meškinis 33'	Report	Huráb 20'; Trampota 26', 28'	Referee: Matthieu Dor (France)

7 July 2024 5th place match	Estonia	2–6	France
15:00	Lepik 17'; Rump 22'	Report	Jacquemin 4'; Arthuphel 20'; Fayos 21', 36'; Tillet 24'; Drouillet 27'	Referee: Raffaele Delvecchio (San Marino)

7 July 2024 3rd place match	Romania	3–10	Denmark
17:00	Florea 13'; Cracan 18'; Măci 30'	Report	Lucht 4', 18'; Wegeberg 8'; Madsen 14'; Wagner 22'; C. Jørgensen 25'; O. Jørgensen 31'; Frandsen 32', 34'; Hoedeman (?)	Referee: Luca Romani (Italy)

7 July 2024 Stage final	Italy	3–2	Switzerland
19:20	Bertacca 4', 19'; Josep Jr. 36'	Report	Hodel 35', 36'	Referee: Andrei Karhu (Estonia)

==== Final standings ====
Key:	Qualified for the Superfinal /	Consigned to relegation play-offs

Pos	Team
1	Italy
2	Switzerland
3	Denmark
4	Romania
5	France
6	Estonia
7	Czechia
8	Lithuania

=== Division B ===
Key:	Promoted to –	2025 Euro Beach Soccer League Division A /	Withdrew

Pos	Team	Pld	W	W+	WP	L	GF	GA	GD	Pts
1	Greece	2	2	0	0	0	11	4	+7	6
2	Norway	2	1	0	0	1	3	6	−3	3
3	Malta	2	0	0	0	2	6	10	–4	0
4	England	0	0	0	0	0	0	0	0	0

3 July 2024	Norway	0–4	Greece
10:00		Report	Katsoulis 21'; Mikelatos 24'; Lympousis 28'; Skourtas 31'	Referee: Sergio Romero (Switzerland)

3 July 2024	England	Cancelled	Malta
12:00

4 July 2024	Greece	Cancelled	England
10:00

4 July 2024	Malta	2–3	Norway
12:00	Agius 4'; Nanapere 17' (pen.)	Report	Gaare 3', 23'; Haaland Aano 10'	Referee: Moreno Longo (Italy)

6 July 2024	England	Cancelled	Norway
10:00

6 July 2024	Greece	7–4	Malta
10:00	Mikelatos 6', 27'; Katsoulis 8'; Karakasis 11'; Tsekouras 20'; Skourtas 25'; Tsitsaris 27'	Report	Muscat 6'; Agius 16'; Bray 27' (pen.); Nanapere 32'	Referee: Saverio Bottalico (Italy)

=== Awards ===
The following were presented after the conclusion of the final day's matches of the respective divisions. Individual awards apply to Division A only.

Stage Winners trophy		Top scorer(s)		Best player	Best goalkeeper
Italy (Division A)	Greece (Division B)	(Switzerland) Noël Ott (Italy) Luca Bertacca	7 goals	(Switzerland) Noël Ott	(Italy) Leandro Casapieri

== Stage 2 (Batumi, 17–21 July) ==
Matches are listed as local time in Batumi, GET (UTC+4) and are those scheduled; actual kick-off times may somewhat differ.

All matches took place at a purpose-built arena at Batumi Boulevard with a capacity of 1,300.

The stage was a designated Division B event. However, its full title was the EBSL Georgia 2024 - Division B / Batumi International Cup, as for the first time in an EBSL stage, guest nations participated. These were the national teams of Ukraine, United Arab Emirates, Lebanon and Saudi Arabia, the latter three being members of the Asian Football Confederation (AFC).

Beginning with a group phase, the teams were split into one group comprising the Division B member teams, and a second "invitees" group composed of the guest nations. As the exclusive Division B phase of the stage, the winners of the Division B group earnt promotion to Division A. At the end of the group phase, the teams progressed to the knockout stage to determine the stage winners and other placings.

England, having withdrawn from stage 1, were originally re-entered into this stage as a Division B team. However, they withdrew again for undisclosed reasons before the publication of the final fixture list.

=== Group stage ===
Key:	Promoted to –	2025 Euro Beach Soccer League Division A
Key:	Advance to –	1st–4th place semifinals /	5th–7th place semifinals /	(H) Hosts

==== Division B teams ====
Pos	Team	Pld	W	W+	WP	L	GF	GA	GD	Pts
1	Georgia (H)	2	1	0	0	1	10	6	+4	3
2	Latvia	2	1	0	0	1	9	10	–1	3
3	Hungary	2	1	0	0	1	9	12	–3	3

17 July 2024	Georgia	6–1	Latvia
19:00	Makharadze; Partenadze; Zhordania	Report	Grīslis

18 July 2024	Latvia	8–4	Hungary
19:00	Skuratovičs 3', 17'; Labuts 6'; Razkovskis 14'; Grīslis 16', 25'; Rubenis 24'; Pastars 29'		Bence 19', 29', 34'; Menyhei 21'	Referee: Ingilab Mammadov (Azerbaijan)

19 July 2024	Georgia	4–5	Hungary
20:30	Partenadze 7', 28'; Ivaniadze 28'; Makharadze 34'	Report	Deak 16'; Laczkó 22', 23'; Kristof 28'; Bocsev 31'	Referee: Ingilab Mammadov (Azerbaijan)

==== Guest teams ====
Pos	Team	Pld	W	W+	WP	L	GF	GA	GD	Pts
1	Ukraine	3	3	0	0	0	17	4	+13	9
2	United Arab Emirates	3	2	0	0	1	12	10	+2	6
3	Lebanon	3	1	0	0	2	10	16	–6	3
4	Saudi Arabia	3	0	0	0	3	7	16	–9	0

17 July 2024	UAE	4–2	Saudi Arabia
17:30		Report

17 July 2024	Lebanon	1–6	Ukraine
20:30		Report

18 July 2024	UAE	6–3	Lebanon
17:30		Report

18 July 2024	Ukraine	6–1	Saudi Arabia
20:30		Report

19 July 2024	Saudi Arabia	4–6	Lebanon
17:30		Report

19 July 2024	Ukraine	5–2	UAE
19:00		Report

=== Knockout stage ===
Key:	Green italics Guest team

==== Semifinals ====
20 July 2024 5th–7th place	Lebanon	bye	—

20 July 2024	Hungary	5–7	Saudi Arabia
17:30		Report

20 July 2024 1st–4th place	Ukraine	4–0	Latvia
19:00		Report

20 July 2024	Georgia	5–6	United Arab Emirates
20:30		Report

==== Finals ====
21 July 2024 5th place match	Lebanon	3–5	Saudi Arabia
17:30		Report

21 July 2024 3rd place match	Georgia	5–2	Latvia
19:00		Report

21 July 2024 Stage final	Ukraine	4–2	United Arab Emirates
20:30		Report

=== Final standings ===
Pos	Team
1	Ukraine
2	United Arab Emirates
3	Georgia
4	Latvia
5	Saudi Arabia
6	Lebanon
7	Hungary

=== Awards ===
The following were presented after the conclusion of the final day's matches. All of the awards were claimed by members of the guest teams.

Stage Winners trophy	Top scorer(s)		Best player	Best goalkeeper
Ukraine	(Saudi Arabia) Hussain Eslam	9 goals	(United Arab Emirates) Waleed Beshr	(Ukraine) Andriy Nerush

== Stage 3 (Chișinău, 26–28 July) ==
Matches are listed as local time in Chișinău, EEST (UTC+3) and are those scheduled; actual kick-off times may somewhat differ.

All matches took place at the FMF Beach Soccer Arena, with a capacity of 1,024. The Saudi Arabian national team, a member of the Asian Football Confederation (AFC), participated as a guest nation during this stage.

Moldova won a Division A stage title for the first time.

=== Division A ===
Key:	Qualified for the Superfinal /	Consigned to relegation play-offs /	Green italics Guest team /	(H) Hosts

Pos	Team	Pld	W	W+	WP	L	GF	GA	GD	Pts
1	Moldova (H)	3	3	0	0	0	16	7	+9	9
2	Poland	3	2	0	0	1	13	12	+1	6
3	Turkey	3	1	0	0	2	8	10	–2	3
4	Saudi Arabia	3	0	0	0	3	8	16	–8	0

26 July 2024	Poland	3–2	Turkey
18:00	Pietrasiak 15', 28'; Bistuła 27'	Report	Bariş 4', 27'	Referee: Luca Romani (Italy)

26 July 2024	Moldova	5–2	Saudi Arabia
19:30	Cojocari 12'; Sîrghi 14'; Popescu 16'; Mudhaya 33' (o.g.); Florea 30'	Report	Alhamami 13'; Ramzi 34'	Referee: Dmytro Dudka (Ukraine)

27 July 2024	Poland	7–4	Saudi Arabia
18:00	Mańka 7'; Pietrasiak 7', 10', 33'; Kłopeć 16'; Niesler 18'; Gajda 24'	Report	Alduiasri 2'; Alyoubi 22'; Pietrasiak 27' (o.g.); Qasem 35'	Referee: Oleg Cebotari (Moldova)

27 July 2024	Moldova	5–2	Turkey
19:30	Ignat 1'; Istrati 4'; Florea 7'; Cojocari 33', 34'	Report	İsmai̇l 21'; Cem Keski̇n 33'	Referee: Luca Romani (Italy)

28 July 2024	Turkey	4–2	Saudi Arabia
18:00	Semi̇h 5', 31'; Efe Lorenzo 17'; Volkan 27'	Report	Alduiasri 3'; Alhamami 21'	Referee: Oleg Cebotari (Moldova)

28 July 2024	Moldova	6–3	Poland
19:30	Popescu 12', 15', 16', 30'; Cojocari 33'; Turta 36'	Report	Pietrasiak 33'; Witkowski 34'; Wardziński 35'	Referee: Luca Romani (Italy)

=== Awards ===
The following were presented after the conclusion of the final day's matches.

Stage Winners trophy	Top scorer(s)		Best player	Best goalkeeper
Moldova	(Poland) Patryk Pietrasiak	6 goals	(Moldova) Petru Popescu	(Moldova) Ruslan Istrati

== Stage 4 (Nazaré, 30 August – 1 September) ==
Matches are listed as local time in Nazaré, WEST (UTC+1) and are those scheduled; actual kick-off times may somewhat differ.

All matches took place at the Estádio do Viveiro – Jordan Santos on Praia de Nazaré (Nazaré Beach).

=== Division A ===
Key:	Qualified for the Superfinal /	Consigned to relegation play-offs /	(H) Hosts

Pos	Team	Pld	W	W+	WP	L	GF	GA	GD	Pts
1	Portugal (H)	3	3	0	0	0	18	7	+11	9
2	Spain	3	2	0	0	1	11	6	+5	6
3	Belarus	3	1	0	0	2	10	17	–7	3
4	Germany	3	0	0	0	3	5	14	–9	0

30 August 2024	Spain	7–0	Belarus
15:30	D. Ardil 5', 12'; Arias 7', 36'; Kuman 9'; Oliver 10'; S. Batis 21'	Report		Referee: Łukasz Ostrowski (Poland)

30 August 2024	Germany	1–6	Portugal
18:00	Peterson 35'	Report	Léo Martins 7', 13'; Widmann 19' (o.g.); Jordan 28'; M. Pintado 30'; Bê Martins 31'	Referee: Jordy Vermeire (Belgium)

31 August 2024	Spain	3–0	Germany
15:30	Arias 13'; Kuman 19'; Ridu 20'	Report		Referee: Francisco Costa (Portugal)

31 August 2024	Portugal	6–5	Belarus
18:00	Rui Coimbra 7'; Léo Martins 10'; Jordan 14'; M. Pintado 17'; Bê Martins 22', 29'	Report	Drozd 1'; Hardzetski 13'; Ryabko 14'; Vasco 17' (o.g.); Novikau 22'	Referee: Vladimir Tashkov (Bulgaria)

1 September 2024	Belarus	5–4	Germany
15:30	Hardzetski 6', 34'; Ustsinovich 11'; Kanstantsinau 28'; Piatrouski 34'	Report	Ebener 7'; Sand 8'; Olli 15'; Engelhardt 22'	Referee: Davide Innaurato (Italy)

1 September 2024	Portugal	6–1	Spain
18:00	Jordan 3'; R. Brilhante 5'; M. Pintado 12', 30'; Léo Martins 13', 33'	Report	Juanmi 17'	Referee: Łukasz Ostrowski (Poland)

=== Awards ===
The following were presented after the conclusion of the final day's matches.

Stage Winners trophy	Top scorer(s)		Best player	Best goalkeeper
Portugal	(Portugal) Léo Martins	5 goals	(Portugal) Léo Martins	(Portugal) Pedro Mano

== Superfinal (Alghero, 10–15 September) ==
Matches are listed as local time in Alghero, CEST (UTC+2) and are those scheduled; actual kick-off times may differ somewhat.

All matches took place at an arena on Lido San Giovanni Beach, with a capacity of 1,200.

=== Relegation play-offs ===
Three teams were due to play in the relegation play-offs, with the worst two being relegated. However, Lithuania and Romania both withdrew before the start of the event (the former due to participate in the relegation play-offs, and the latter having qualified for the Superfinal). Per the tournament regulations, teams withdrawing automatically suffer relegation to Division B. This therefore resolved the outcome of the two teams to be relegated this season, without the play-offs needing to take place. Germany replaced Romania in the Superfinal.

=== Group stage ===
==== Draw ====
The draw to divide the teams into their respective groups took place on 3 September 2024.

Key: Advance to –	Knockout stage /	9th place match /	11th place match /	(H) Hosts

===== Group A =====
Pos	Team	Pld	W	W+	WP	L	GF	GA	GD	Pts
1	Spain	3	3	0	0	0	14	5	+9	6
2	Italy (H)	3	1	1	0	1	11	9	+2	5
3	Estonia	3	0	1	0	2	9	15	–6	2
4	Germany	3	0	0	0	3	9	14	–5	0

10 September 2024	Spain	5–2	Germany
12:45	Suli Batis 24'; Ramy 28', 28', 33'; Jose Arias 32'	Report	Olli 10'; Domingo 22' (o.g.)	Referee: Sergio Gomes (Portugal)

10 September 2024	Estonia	2–6	Italy
18:00	Rump 19'; Lilleorg 36'	Report	Giordani 1'; Remedi 8'; Zurlo 13'; D'Agostino 16'; Casapieri 17'; Nõmmiko 26' (o.g.)	Referee: Vitalij Gomolko (Lithuania)

11 September 2024	Spain	5–2	Estonia
14:00	Domingo 14'; Chiky 15', 22'; Suli Batis 27'; D. Ardil 31'	Report	Kigaste 9'; Alaväli 30'	Referee: Mehdi Sayoud (Belgium)

11 September 2024	Italy	4–3 (a.e.t.)	Germany
18:00	Genovali 17'; Giordani 34'; Fazzini 37' (e.t.); Sciacca 39' (e.t.)	Report	Baaske 27'; Peterson 31'; Olli 38' (e.t.)	Referee: Vladimir Tashkov (Bulgaria)

12 September 2024	Germany	4–5 (a.e.t.)	Estonia
12:45	Peterson 7'; Kaufmann 15'; Munskind 16' (o.g.); Sand 31'	Report	Lilleorg 7'; Munskind 24'; Lepik 25'; Nõmmiko 27'; Alaväli 39' (e.t.)	Referee: Vitalij Gomolko (Lithuania)

12 September 2024	Italy	1–4	Spain
18:00	D. Ardil 7' (o.g.)	Report	Kuman 19'; D. Ardil 30'; Suli Batis 30'; Jose Arias 36'	Referee: Łukasz Ostrowski (Poland)

===== Group B =====
Pos	Team	Pld	W	W+	WP	L	GF	GA	GD	Pts
1	Belarus	3	3	0	0	0	23	9	+14	9
2	Switzerland	3	0	2	0	1	18	17	+1	4
3	Moldova	3	0	1	0	2	8	17	–9	2
4	France	3	0	0	0	3	10	16	–6	0

10 September 2024	Switzerland	6–9	Belarus
10:15	Eliott 5'; Ott 6'; Stankovic 12', 36'; Hodel 13'; Rodrigues 27'	Report	Hapon 6', 23'; Hardzetski 8'; Ryabko 10', 27'; Novikau 12'; Piatrouski 13', 25'; Drozd 36'	Referee: Łukasz Ostrowski (Poland)

10 September 2024	France	3–4 (a.e.t.)	Moldova
14:00	Basquaise 13'; Salim 28'; Varrel 34'	Report	Florea 13'; Garanovschi 19'; Sîrghi 24'; Popescu 39' (e.t.)	Referee: Ojaos Valera (Spain)

11 September 2024	Switzerland	6–4 (a.e.t.)	France
10:15	Ott 21', 28', 28'; Hodel 35', 39' (e.t.); Spacca 38' (e.t.)	Report	Vernhet 7', 31'; Basquaise 11'; Salim 27'	Referee: Saverio Bottalico (Italy)

11 September 2024	Moldova	0–8	Belarus
12:45		Report	Chaikouski 4', 19'; Bokach 5', 26'; Bryshtel 11', 12'; Hapon 21'; Ustsinovich 30'	Referee: Vitalij Gomolko (Lithuania)

12 September 2024	Belarus	6–3	France
10:15	Bokach 1'; Bryshtel 5'; Drozd 13', 36'; Chaikouski 17'; Hardzetski 18'	Report	Vernhet 8'; Constant 25'; Salim 31'	Referee: Csaba Baghy (Hungary)

12 September 2024	Moldova	4–6 (a.e.t.)	Switzerland
14:00	Turta 15'; Florea 25'; Ciobotaru 35'; Graur 36'	Report	Graur 12' (o.g.); Ott 27', 32'; Knöpfli 29'; Hodel 38' (e.t.), 39' (e.t.)	Referee: Moreno Longo (Italy)

===== Group C =====
Pos	Team	Pld	W	W+	WP	L	GF	GA	GD	Pts
1	Portugal	3	3	0	0	0	19	6	+13	9
2	Czech Republic	3	1	0	1	1	5	12	–7	4
3	Poland	3	1	0	0	2	10	9	+1	3
4	Denmark	3	0	0	0	3	3	10	–7	0

10 September 2024	Poland	4–1	Denmark
09:00	Brochocki 6', 35'; Błaszczyk 18'; Niesler 36'	Report	Wegeberg 20'	Referee: Matthieu Dor (France)

10 September 2024	Czech Republic	1–9	Portugal
15:30	Hurab 24'	Report	Bê Martins 1'; M. Pintado 7', 11'; Jordan 16', 19'; Bernardo L. 18'; R. Brilhante 19'; Léo Martins 20'; D. Algarvio 32'	Referee: Mehdi Sayoud (Belgium)

11 September 2024	Poland	2–2 (a.e.t.) (3–5 p)	Czech Republic
09:00	Niesler 19'; Pietrasiak 27'	Report	Trampota 21'; Kortvelyesi 21'	Referee: Luca Romani (Italy)

11 September 2024	Portugal	4–1	Denmark
15:30	Rui Coimbra 13'; Jordan 15'; Pedro Mano 21'; M. Pintado 24'	Report	Levin 31'	Referee: Ojaos Valera (Spain)

12 September 2024	Denmark	1–2	Czech Republic
09:00	Madsen 17'	Report	Pekarek 5'; Trampota 25'	Referee: Vladimir Tashkov (Bulgaria)

12 September 2024	Portugal	6–4	Poland
15:30	D. Algarvio 5'; Jordan 9', 16', 31'; M. Pintado 11'; Bê Martins 33'	Report	Brochocki 2'; Pietrasiak 5'; Witkowski 23'; Niesler 31'	Referee: Malte Gerhardt (Germany)

=== 9th–12th place matches ===
==== 11th place match ====
14 September 2024
11:30

France	5–3	Denmark
Varrel 1'; Vernhet 26'; Bru 29'; Salazar 35'; Drouillet 36'	Report	Hoedeman 5'; Wegeberg 6'; Dorph 29'

Referee: Fiammetta Susanna (Italy)

==== 9th place match ====
14 September 2024
10:15

Moldova	3–4	Germany
Ciobotaru 1'; Turta 9'; Florea 16'	Report	Baaske 9'; Engelhardt 10'; Sand 16'; Olli 24'

Referee: Angelika Gębka (Poland)

=== Knockout stage ===
The quarterfinal draw took place on 12 September.

Quarterfinals losers placement (Note: Based on group stage results)
5th place – 15 September
Czech Republic (p)	3 (4)
Switzerland	3 (2)
7th place – 15 September
Poland (a.e.t.)	4
Estonia	3

Quarterfinals
13 September
Spain	3
Poland	2
13 September
Italy	5
Czech Republic	2
13 September
Belarus	w/o (Note: Estonia refused to fulfil their fixture against Belarus in protest of the Belarusian involvement in the Russian invasion of Ukraine. For administrative purposes, Belarus were awarded a 3–0 walkover win.)
Estonia
13 September
Portugal	11
Switzerland	4

Semifinals
14 September
Spain	3
Italy (a.e.t.)	4
14 September
Belarus	3
Portugal	7

Final
15 September
Italy	1
Portugal	5
Third place match
15 September
Spain	1
Belarus	6

==== Quarter-finals ====
13 September 2024
12:45

Belarus	3–0 w/o	Estonia
	Report

13 September 2024
14:00

Spain	3–2	Poland
Pedro 9'; Suli Batis 11', 18'	Report	Gajda 17', 30'

Referee: Sergio Gomes (Portugal)

13 September 2024
15:30

Portugal	11–4	Switzerland
Jordan 2', 10', 33'; Pedro Mano 3'; M. Pintado 10', 31', 35'; R. Pinhal 11'; Rui Coimbra 13'; Léo Martins 15'; R. Brilhante 16'	Report	Knöpfli 10', 19', 31'; Hodel 22'

Referee: Ojaos Valera (Spain)

13 September 2024
18:00

Italy	5–2	Czech Republic
Alla 6'; Giordani 21', 27', 27'; Sciacca 35'	Report	Kortvelyesi 32'; Trampota 33'

Referee: Vitalij Gomolko (Lithuania)

==== Semi-finals ====
14 September 2024
15:30

Belarus	3–7	Portugal
Bokach 5'; Ryabko 9'; Hapon 18'	Report	R. Brilhante 5'; Léo Martins 10'; Avgustov 19' (o.g.); Jordan 15'; M. Pintado 17'; D. Algarvio 24', 34'

Referee: Mehdi Sayoud (Belgium)

14 September 2024
18:00

Spain	3–4 (a.e.t.)	Italy
Pablo 5'; Suli Batis 15', 36'	Report	Remedi 7', 7', 37' (e.t.); Fazzini 21'

Referee: Vitalij Gomolko (Lithuania)

==== Play-offs ====
===== 7th place match =====
15 September 2024
10:15

Poland	4–3 (a.e.t.)	Estonia
Witkowski 28'; Błaszczyk 34'; Gajda 36', 38' (e.t.)	Report	Rump 1'; Marmor 24'; Lepik 28'

Referee: Luca Romani (Italy)

===== 5th place match =====
15 September 2024
12:45

Switzerland	3–3 (a.e.t.)	Czech Republic
Hodel 8', 26'; Knöpfli 24'	Report	Trampota 14', 33'; Kortvelyesi 36'
Penalties
	2–4

Referee: Sergio Gomes (Portugal)

===== 3rd place match =====
15 September 2024
15:30

Spain	1–6	Belarus
Ramy 16'	Report	Ryabko 1'; Ustsinovich 8'; Drozd 16', 24'; Hapon 29'; Kanstantsinau 31'

Referee: Moreno Longo (Italy)

===== Final =====
15 September 2024
18:00

Italy	1–5	Portugal
Zurlo 35'	Report	Bê Martins 3', 25'; A. Lourenço 6'; Jordan 9'; R. Brilhante 31'

Referee: Łukasz Ostrowski (Poland)

=== Awards ===
==== Winners trophy ====
2024 Euro Beach Soccer League
Champions

Portugal
Ninth title

==== Individual awards ====
Top scorer(s)
(Portugal) Jordan Santos
11 goals
Best player
(Portugal) Bê Martins
Best goalkeeper
(Portugal) Pedro Mano

=== Final standings ===
Pos	Team	Result
1	Portugal	EBSL Champions (9th title)
2	Italy	Runners-up
3	Belarus	Third place
4	Spain	
5	Czech Republic	
6	Switzerland	
7	Poland	
8	Estonia	
9	Germany	
10	Moldova	
11	France	
12	Denmark	

== See also ==
- 2024 Women's Euro Beach Soccer League
