= 2026 Euro Beach Soccer League =

Tournament details
- Host countries: Spain; Georgia; Moldova; Italy
- Dates: 20 May – 13 September
- Venues: 4 (in 4 host cities)

Final positions
- Champions: Spain (6th title)
- Runners-up: Italy
- Third place: Switzerland
- Fourth place: Denmark

Tournament statistics
- Matches played: 82
- Goals scored: 679 (8.28 per match)

The 2026 Euro Beach Soccer League was the 29th edition of the Euro Beach Soccer League (EBSL), the annual, premier competition in European beach soccer contested between men's national teams. It is organised by Beach Soccer Worldwide (BSWW).

This season, the competing teams continued to take part in two divisions: the top tier (Division A) and the bottom tier (Division B).

Italy were the defending champions, but finished as runners-up to Spain who claimed their sixth title, and their first in 20 years. Portugal recorded their worst ever result in the competition by finishing in sixth place.

== Calendar and locations ==
The calendar was revealed on 20 March 2026.

Phase	Dates	Country	City	Stage	Divisions	
Regular season	20–24 May	Spain	El Puerto de Santa María	Stage 1	A	
Regular season	15–19 July	Georgia	Batumi	Stage 2		B
Regular season	29 July – 2 August	Moldova	Chișinău	Stage 3	A	
Play-offs	8–13 September	Italy	Viareggio	Relegation play-outs	A	
Play-offs	8–13 September	Italy	Viareggio	Superfinal	A	

== Stage 1 (El Puerto de Santa María, 20–24 May) ==
Matches are listed as local time in El Puerto de Santa María, CEST (UTC+2) and are those scheduled; actual kick-off times may somewhat differ.

All matches took place inside the Plaza de toros de El Puerto bullring, in tandem with stage 1 of the women's competition.

=== Division A ===
Key: Advance to –	1st–4th place semifinals /	5th–8th place semifinals /	(H) Hosts

==== Group 1 ====
Pos	Team	Pld	W	W+	WP	L	GF	GA	GD	Pts
1	Spain (H)	3	3	0	0	0	16	8	+8	9
2	Switzerland	3	2	0	0	1	18	10	+8	6
3	Poland	3	1	0	0	2	14	14	0	3
4	Lithuania	3	0	0	0	3	3	19	−16	0

20 May 2026	Switzerland	7–5	Poland
13:30	Hodel 7', 14', 25'; Borer 12'; Ott 14', 18'; Steinemann 26'	Report	Ott 4' (o.g.); Błaszczyk 6', 19'; Pietrasiak 9'; Brochocki 21'	Referee: Moreno Longo (Italy)

20 May 2026	Lithuania	1–6	Spain
20:00	Giedraitis 20'	Report	Brian 7'; Chiky 11'; Kuman 16', 24'; Suli Batis 16', 36'	Referee: Matthieu Dor (France)

21 May 2026	Switzerland	8–1	Lithuania
13:30	Borer 2', 6', 16'; Steinemann 9', 24'; Hodel 21', 28'; J. Knöpfli 36'	Report	Makutunovičius 22'	Referee: Annett Unterbeck (Germany)

21 May 2026	Spain	6–4	Poland
17:30	Kuman 11', 25'; Gatica 22'; Chiky 24', 24'; Pepe 28'	Report	Poźniak 8'; Kosmal 15'; Fudała 18'; Pietrasiak 24'	Referee: Vladimir Tashkov (Bulgaria)

22 May 2026	Poland	5–1	Lithuania
16:00	Pietrasiak 6', 23'; Brochocki 13'; Fudała 19'; Mańka 36'	Report	Pietrasiak 2' (o.g.)	Referee: Patricia Gómez (Spain)

22 May 2026	Spain	4–3	Switzerland
20:00	Pepe 9'; Steinemann 24' (o.g.); Domingo 24'; Kuman 30'	Report	Hodel 12'; J. Knöpfli 16'; Eliott 20'	Referee: Saverio Bottalico (Italy)

==== Group 2 ====
Pos	Team	Pld	W	W+	WP	L	GF	GA	GD	Pts
1	Portugal	3	3	0	0	0	16	6	+10	9
2	Belarus	3	2	0	0	1	22	10	+12	6
3	Czechia	3	0	0	1	2	5	13	−8	1
4	Turkey	3	0	0	0	3	6	20	−14	0

20 May 2026	Turkey	2–10	Belarus
16:00	Serkan 24'; Hazar 32'	Report	Hapon 1', 26'; Kanstantsinau 5'; Ryabko 7', 11'; Avgustov 8'; Drozd 24', 33'; Chaikouski 25'; Hardzetski 33'	Referee: Łukasz Ostrowski (Poland)

20 May 2026	Portugal	3–0	Czechia
17:30	Bê Martins 1'; Tim 11'; Jordan 22'	Report		Referee: José Pardeiro (Spain)

21 May 2026	Belarus	8–3	Czechia
11:00	Bryshtel 4', 31', 32'; Piatrouski 9'; Hardzetski 13'; Chaikouski 28'; Kanstantsinau 34'; Avgustov 36'	Report	Radosta 7'; Trampota 8'; Valeš 25'	Referee: Patricia Gómez (Spain)

21 May 2026	Portugal	8–2	Turkey
15:00	Léo Martins 2', 2', 34'; Coimbra 8'; Bernardo L. 16'; Fábio 17'; Pola 20'; Tim 28'	Report	Uğur 14'; Hazar 16'	Referee: Saverio Bottalico (Italy)

22 May 2026	Czechia	2–2 (a.e.t.) (5–3 p)	Turkey
13:30	Pekárek 6'; Trampota 32'	Report	Cengizhan 5', 36'	Referee: Moreno Longo (Italy)
	Penalties
	Radosta (penalty scored); Pekárek (penalty scored); Salák (penalty scored); Šilhavý (penalty scored); Trampota (penalty scored)		(penalty scored) T. Özdemir; (penalty scored) Serkan; (penalty scored) Ege

22 May 2026	Belarus	4–5	Portugal
17:30	Ryabko 1', 5'; Hapon 17'; Bryshtel 26'	Report	R. Brilhante 1'; Fábio 4', 24'; Tim 17'; Bê Martins 25'	Referee: Łukasz Ostrowski (Poland)

==== Knockout stage ====
===== Semifinals =====
23 May 2026 5th–8th place	Poland	6–0	Turkey
13:30	Pietrasiak 3', 33'; Niesler 10'; Kosmal 20'; Błaszczyk 28'; Mańka 33'	Report		Referee: José Pardeiro (Spain)

23 May 2026	Czechia	4–7	Lithuania
16:00	Pekárek 13'; Šilhavý 18'; Körtvélyeši 25'; Trampota 32'	Report	Plytnikas 10'; Kliukoit 13'; Makutunovičius 17', 30'; Činikas 18'; Giedraitis 25', 34'	Referee: Marcelo Ibáñez (Spain)

23 May 2026 1st–4th place	Portugal	9–4	Switzerland
17:30	Coimbra 2'; R. Brilhante 3'; Tim 5'; Bê Martins 10', 18'; Léo Martins 14', 19', 36'; Pola 30'	Report	Borer 16', 18'; Hodel 17'; J. Knöpfli 34'	Referee: Moreno Longo (Italy)

23 May 2026	Spain	6–4	Belarus
20:00	Chiky 7', 23'; Brian 10', 17', 29'; Domingo 36'	Report	Drozd 3'; Hapon 9'; Kanstantsinau 16'; Novikau 29'	Referee: Matthieu Dor (France)

===== Finals =====
24 May 2026 7th place match	Czechia	1–4	Turkey
13:30	Oğuzhan 23' (o.g.)	Report	Ege 3'; Serkan 5', 35'; Hazar 11'	Referee: Matthieu Dor (France)

24 May 2026 5th place match	Poland	3–2	Lithuania
16:00	Mainka 9'; Pietrasiak 25', 26'	Report	Makutunovičius 18'; Pietrasiak 25' (o.g.)	Referee: Annett Unterbeck (Germany)

24 May 2026 3rd place match	Belarus	6–4	Switzerland
17:30	Bryshtel 12', 31', 36'; Ott 15' (o.g.); Ustsinovich 21'; Drozd 31'	Report	J. Knöpfli 15'; Ott 19'; Borer 21', 31'	Referee: Patricia Gómez (Spain)

24 May 2026 Stage final	Portugal	5–5 (a.e.t.) (3–5 p)	Spain
20:00	R. Brilhante 4'; Bê Martins 21'; Léo Martins 22', 24'; Coimbra 32'	Report	Chiky 5', 16', 18', 30'; Kuman 9'	Attendance: 8,500; Referee: Saverio Bottalico (Italy)
	Penalties
	Bê Martins (penalty scored); Fábio (penalty scored); Tim (penalty scored); Léo Martins (penalty missed)		(penalty scored) Suli Batis; (penalty scored) Chiky; (penalty scored) José Oliver; (penalty scored) Brian; (penalty scored) Kuman

==== Final standings ====
Key:	Qualified for the Superfinal /	Consigned to the relegation play-outs

Pos	Team
1	Spain
2	Portugal
3	Belarus
4	Switzerland
5	Poland
6	Lithuania
7	Turkey
8	Czechia

=== Awards ===
The following were presented after the conclusion of the final day's matches.

Stage winners trophy	Top scorer(s)		Best player	Best goalkeeper
Spain	(Spain) Chiky Ardil	9 goals	(Spain) Chiky Ardil	(Spain) Pablo López

== Stage 2 (Batumi, 15–19 July) ==
Matches are listed as local time in Batumi, GET (UTC+4) and are those scheduled; actual kick-off times may somewhat differ.

=== Division B ===
Key:	Advance to –	1st–4th place semifinals /	5th–7th place matches/	Withdrew /	(H) Hosts

==== Group 1 ====
Pos	Team	Pld	W	W+	WP	L	GF	GA	GD	Pts
1	Norway	2	1	1	0	0	5	3	+2	5
2	Georgia (H)	2	1	0	0	1	3	3	0	3
3	Malta	2	0	0	0	2	3	5	−2	0
4	Romania	0	0	0	0	0	0	0	0	0

15 July 2026	Norway	2–1 (a.e.t.)	Georgia
20:00	Haaland 36', 39'	Report	Shamiladze 30'	Referee: Nail Naghiyev (Azerbaijan)

16 July 2026	Malta	2–3	Norway
18:00	Cutajar 22'; Bray 36'	Report	Risanger 3', 4'; Haga 14'	Referee: Andrei Karhu (Estonia)

17 July 2026	Georgia	2–1	Malta
21:00	Kurdadze 18'; Limidze 24'	Report	Bray 36'	Referee: Fiammetta Susanna (Italy)

==== Group 2 ====
Pos	Team	Pld	W	W+	WP	L	GF	GA	GD	Pts
1	Latvia	3	3	0	0	0	15	7	+8	9
2	Azerbaijan	3	2	0	0	1	14	8	+6	6
3	Slovakia	3	0	1	0	2	9	13	−4	2
4	England	3	0	0	0	3	8	18	−10	0

15 July 2026	Slovakia	3–6	Latvia
17:00	Letko 23'; Lipovský 29', 30'	Report	Grīslis 6', 19', 24'; Ģēģers 7'; Piļipčuks 12'; Kočerigins 28'	Referee: Ago Kärtmann (Estonia)

15 July 2026	Azerbaijan	8–3	England
18:30	Allahguliyev 14', 15', 19', 21'; S. Mammadov 16', 32'; Janiyev 32', 33'	Report	Hadjizinoviou 1', 32'; Hulme 17'	Referee: Fiammetta Susanna (Italy)

16 July 2026	Azerbaijan	4–2	Slovakia
19:30	Gasimov 6'; Gurbatov 7'; Aliyev 19'; O. Mammadov 27'	Report	Lipovský 18'; Letko 19'	Referee: Kakha Vasadze (Georgia)

16 July 2026	Latvia	6–2	England
21:00	Grīslis 1', 21'; Ģēģers 10'; Spunde 28', 33'; Puriņš 35'	Report	Robinson 21'; Lawson 25'	Referee: Dmytro Dudka (Ukraine)

17 July 2026	England	3–4 (a.e.t.)	Slovakia
18:00	Hulme 4'; Robinson 24'; Friery 36'	Report	Turoň 9'; Šmálik 12'; Lawson 13' (o.g.); Hrnčiar 39'	Referee: Nail Naghiyev (Azerbaijan)

17 July 2026	Latvia	3–2	Azerbaijan
19:30	Grīslis 10'; Ģēģers 18'; Sakne 27'	Report	O. Mammadov 17', 36'	Referee: Ago Kärtmann (Estonia)

==== 5th–7th place matches ====
18 July 2026	Slovakia	3–1	England
11:00	Lipovský 7'; Polaček 12'; Hrnčiar 36'	Report	Johnson 23'	Referee: Ago Kärtmann (Estonia)

18 July 2026	Malta	2–5	England
18:00	Bray 11', 35'	Report	Johnson 12'; Black 12'; Lawson 15', 24'; Robinson 25'	Referee: Mikheili Kupatadze (Georgia)

19 July 2026	Slovakia	3–4 (a.e.t.)	Malta
16:30	Šmálik 2'; Hustý 13'; Lipovský 14'	Report	Cassar 16'; Venuto 21'; Bray 36'; Muscat 39'	Referee: Kakha Vasadze (Georgia)

==== Knockout stage ====
===== Semifinals =====
18 July 2026	Norway	1–6	Azerbaijan
19:30	Hellebust 11'	Report	Aliyev 4', 30'; Allahguliyev 7', 29'; O. Mammadov 7'; S. Mammadov 21'	Referee: Dmytro Dudka (Ukraine)

18 July 2026	Latvia	5–4	Georgia
21:00	Grīslis 1'; Labuts 4'; Ģēģers 7', 30'; Piļipčuks 20'	Report	Lomidze 4'; Shamiladze 22'; Makharadze 22'; Kurdadze 28'	Referee: Andrei Karhu (Estonia)

===== Third place match =====
19 July 2026	Norway	3–6	Georgia
18:00	Brekken 15'; Paulos 16', 26'	Report	Lomidze 9'; Meskhi 10'; Kurdadze 11'; Diakvnishvili 16'; Shamiladze 16', 35'	Referee: Nail Naghiyev (Azerbaijan)

===== Final =====
19 July 2026	Azerbaijan	4–0	Latvia
19:30	Aliyev 9'; Manafov 12', 17'; O. Mammadov 13'	Report		Referee: Ago Kärtmann (Estonia)

==== Final standings ====
Key:	Promotion to the 2027 EBSL Division A

Pos	Team
1	Azerbaijan
2	Latvia
3	Georgia
4	Norway
5	Slovakia
6	England
7	Malta
WD	Romania

=== Awards ===
The following were presented after the conclusion of the final day's matches.

Stage winners trophy	Top scorer(s)		Best player	Best goalkeeper
Azerbaijan	(Latvia) Toms Grīslis	7 goals	(Azerbaijan) Sahib Mammadov	(Azerbaijan) Elchin Gasimov

== Stage 3 (Chișinău, 29 July – 2 August) ==
Matches are listed as local time in Chișinău, EEST (UTC+3) and are those scheduled; actual kick-off times may somewhat differ.

All matches took place at the FMF Beach Soccer Arena (also known as the Orange Arena for sponsporship reasons), with a capacity of 1,024.

Romania and France were originally due to compete at this stage, however both teams withdrew; the latter due to administrative issues, and the former opted to compete in Division B instead (despite earning promotion last season). This therefore marked the first season in EBSL history not to feature France. They were replaced by Kazakhstan and Belgium respectively.

=== Division A ===
Key: Advance to –	1st–4th place semifinals /	5th–8th place semifinals /	(H) Hosts

==== Group 3 ====
Pos	Team	Pld	W	W+	WP	L	GF	GA	GD	Pts
1	Italy	3	3	0	0	0	27	2	+25	9
2	Moldova (H)	3	2	0	0	1	6	11	−5	6
3	Kazakhstan	3	0	0	1	2	5	17	−12	1
4	Belgium	3	0	0	0	3	5	13	−8	0

29 July 2026	Italy	6–1	Belgium
16:00	Josep Jr. 13'; Tanguy 15' (o.g.); Bertacca 17'; Remedi A. 24'; Sassari 25'; Fazzini 34'	Report	Tanguy 13'	Referee: Angelika Gębka (Poland)

29 July 2026	Kazakhstan	1–2	Moldova
20:00	Muralinov 26'	Report	Florea 18'; Ignat 19'	Referee: Jurijs Ivušins (Latvia)

30 July 2026	Italy	12–1	Kazakhstan
16:00	Fazzini 1'; Josep Jr. 2', 12'; Andriani 3', 5', 6'; Casapieri 10'; Alla 24'; Remedi A. 25'; Sciacca 25'; Genovali 27'; Bertacca 32'	Report	Dering 18'	Referee: Vladimir Tashkov (Bulgaria)

30 July 2026	Moldova	4–1	Belgium
20:00	Sîrghi 5', 12', 34'; Gurjui 9'	Report	Jonathan 24'	Referee: Laurynas Aržuolaitis (Lithuania)

31 July 2026	Belgium	3–3 (a.e.t.) (1–3 p)	Kazakhstan
16:00	Romain 23'; Dorian 27'; Anis 34'	Report	Shotanov 24'; Demeshko 33', 35'	Referee: Jurijs Ivušins (Latvia)
	Penalties
	Anis (penalty scored)		(penalty scored) Dering; (penalty scored) Demeshko; (penalty scored) Yershin

31 July 2026	Moldova	0–9	Italy
20:00		Report	Fazzini 4'; Bertacca 6'; Giordani 7'; Josep Jr. 15'; Genovali 17'; Alla 17'; Remedi A. 24', 29'; Casapieri 24'	Referee: Sergio Soares (Portugal)

==== Group 4 ====
Pos	Team	Pld	W	W+	WP	L	GF	GA	GD	Pts
1	Denmark	3	2	1	0	0	15	8	+7	8
2	Germany	3	2	0	0	1	9	8	+1	6
3	Ukraine	3	1	0	0	2	10	9	+1	3
4	Estonia	3	0	0	0	3	5	14	−9	0

29 July 2026	Denmark	4–3 (a.e.t.)	Germany
13:30	Pilgaard 1', 1'; Wegeberg 2'; Damm 37'	Report	Wegeberg 9' (o.g.); Olli 13'; Mülling 33'	Referee: Laurynas Aržuolaitis (Lithuania)

29 July 2026	Estonia	1–5	Ukraine
18:45	Kigaste 28'	Report	Kislov 2'; Samoilenko 3'; Levchenko I. 9', 33'; Merezhyn 29'	Referee: Özcan Sultanoğlu (Turkey)

30 July 2026	Denmark	6–2	Estonia
13:30	Madsen 2', 4', 9'; Wegeberg 13'; Hansen 14'; Schmidt 17'	Report	Lilleorg 10'; Munskind 36'	Referee: Sergio Soares (Portugal)

30 July 2026	Ukraine	2–3	Germany
18:45	Voitenko 1'; Yarmak 36'	Report	Olli 16'; Peterson 23'; Widmann 33'	Referee: Vitalij Gomolko (Lithuania)

31 July 2026	Germany	3–2	Estonia
13:30	Vasilets 12'; Schulte 27', 28'	Report	Saarts 23', 34'	Referee: Vladimir Tashkov (Bulgaria)

31 July 2026	Ukraine	3–5	Denmark
18:45	Levchenko I. 10'; Shchytnik 18', 36'	Report	Frandsen 6'; Damm 9', 26', 29'; De Fries 10'	Referee: Özcan Sultanoğlu (Turkey)

==== Knockout stage ====
===== Semifinals =====
1 August 2026 5th–8th place	Kazakhstan	7–5	Estonia
13:30	Muralinov 4', 8', 33'; Minbayev 5', 35'; Dering 22', 22'	Report	Kigaste 4'; Lilleorg 7'; Thomson 15'; Vihmoja 31'; Kallaste 33'	Referee: İdris Yavuz (Turkey)

1 August 2026	Ukraine	4–1	Belgium
16:00	Voitenko 1'; Shchytnik 21'; Budzko 26'; Zaloznyi 35'	Report	Dorian 34'	Referee: Angelika Gębka (Poland)

1 August 2026 1st–4th place	Italy	6–2	Germany
18:45	Giordani 4'; Sassari 6'; Fazzini 10', 27'; Andriani 11'; Bertacca 18'	Report	Baaske 7', 9'	Referee: Vitalij Gomolko (Lithuania)

1 August 2026	Denmark	4–0	Moldova
20:00	Wegeberg 3', 22'; Pilgaard 14'; Madsen 26'	Report		Referee: Laurynas Aržuolaitis (Lithuania)

===== Finals =====
2 August 2026 7th place match	Estonia	11–5	Belgium
13:30	Lilleorg 8', 9', 28', 34'; Laurits 13'; Kigaste 22'; Raku 23'; Munskind 24', 35', 36'; Saarts 34'	Report	Rayan 16'; David 28', 28', 33'; Anis 30'	Referee: Sergiu Proca (Moldova)

2 August 2026 5th place match	Kazakhstan	3–4 (a.e.t.)	Ukraine
16:00	Shevchuk 14'; Muralinov 18'; Minbayev 27'	Report	Shchytnik 4'; Levchenko N. 28', 28'; Voitenko 37'	Referee: Laurynas Aržuolaitis (Lithuania)

2 August 2026 3rd place match	Germany	5–3	Moldova
18:45	Mülling 18'; Schulte 24'; Peterson 33'; Baaske 33'; Olli 34'	Report	Peterson 2' (o.g.); Florea 17'; Beșelea 36'	Referee: Jurijs Ivušins (Latvia)

2 August 2026 Stage final	Italy	4–3 (a.e.t.)	Denmark
20:00	Remedi A. 8'; Giordani 13'; Sassari 36'; Josep Jr. 39'	Report	Pilgaard 13'; Wegeberg 29'; Frandsen 33'	Referee: Vladimir Tashkov (Bulgaria)

==== Final standings ====
Key:	Qualified for the Superfinal /	Consigned to the relegation play-outs

Pos	Team
1	Italy
2	Denmark
3	Germany
4	Moldova
5	Ukraine
6	Kazakhstan
7	Estonia
8	Belgium

=== Awards ===
The following were presented after the conclusion of the final day's matches.

Stage winners trophy	Top scorer(s)		Best player	Best goalkeeper
Italy	(Estonia) Juhan Lilleorg	6 goals	(Italy) Josep Junior	(Denmark) Gustav Madsen

== Relegation play-outs (Viareggio, 9–11 September) ==
Matches are listed as local time in Viareggio, CEST (UTC+2) and are those scheduled; actual kick-off times may differ somewhat.

The two teams that finish bottom are relegated to the 2027 EBSL Division B; the top two retain their place in Division A.

Key: Outcome –	Relegated to 2027 Division B

Pos	Team	Pld	W	W+	WP	L	GF	GA	GD	Pts
1	Czechia	3	3	0	0	0	12	8	+4	9
2	Turkey	3	2	0	0	1	13	11	+2	6
3	Estonia	3	1	0	0	2	13	14	−1	3
4	Belgium	3	0	0	0	3	8	13	−5	0

9 September 2026	Turkey	2–3	Czechia
11:30	Ege 27'; Hazar 27'	Report	Radosta 5'; Trampota 6'; Andy 21'	Referee: Davide Innaurato (Italy)

9 September 2026	Belgium	2–5	Estonia
12:45	Vihmoja 5' (o.g.); Rose 35'	Report	Munskind 1', 23'; Hoolma 5'; Remmelgas 7'; Tanguy 12' (o.g.)	Referee: Fiammetta Susanna (Italy)

10 September 2026	Turkey	6–5	Belgium
11:30	Lambert 17' (o.g.); Serkan 20'; Ege 21'; Emrah 30'; Uğur 36'; Hazar 36'	Report	Rose 2'; Panneel 4'; Putzu 13'; Cardon 14'; Groust 23'	Referee: Vitalij Gomolko (Lithuania)

10 September 2026	Estonia	5–7	Czechia
12:45	Pekárek 22' (o.g.); Marmor 25', 34'; Saarts 28', 28'	Report	Trampota 7', 31', 36'; Šilhavý 12'; Radosta 29', 36'; Pekárek 31'	Referee: Angelika Gębka (Poland)

11 September 2026	Czechia	2–1	Belgium
09:00	Špaček 6'; Radosta 10'	Report	Lambert 15'	Referee: Sérgio Soares (Portugal)

11 September 2026	Estonia	3–5	Turkey
	Liivanurm 11'; Marmor 12'; Rahnik 27'	Report	Ege 4'; Sekran 5', 21'; Hazar 12'; Oğuzhan 28'	Referee: Moreno Longo (Italy)

== Superfinal (Viareggio, 8–13 September) ==
Matches are listed as local time in Viareggio, CEST (UTC+2) and are those scheduled; actual kick-off times may differ somewhat.

All matches take place at Matteo Valenti Beach Stadium, with a capacity of 1,000.

=== Group stage ===
==== Draw ====
The draw to divide the teams into their respective groups took place on 6 August 2026.

Key: Advance to –	Semi-finals /	5th–8th place semi-finals /	(H) Hosts

==== Group A ====
Pos	Team	Pld	W	W+	WP	L	GF	GA	GD	Pts
1	Italy (H)	3	3	0	0	0	25	7	+18	9
2	Denmark	3	1	0	0	2	12	13	−1	3
3	Moldova	3	0	1	0	2	11	21	−10	2
4	Germany	3	0	0	1	2	9	16	−7	1

8 September 2026	Denmark	2–2 (a.e.t.) (2–4 p)	Germany
14:00	Jensen 8'; De Fries 36'	Report	Kaufmann 24'; Peterson 36'	Referee: Mehdi Sayoud (Belgium)
	Penalties
	Jensen (penalty missed); Wegeberg (penalty missed); Hansen (penalty scored); Pilgaard (penalty scored)		(penalty scored) Peterson; (penalty scored) Baaske; (penalty scored) Meier; (penalty scored) Kaufmann

8 September 2026	Moldova	2–9	Italy
18:00	Stăvilă 11'; Creciun 19'	Report	Alla 4', 23'; Andriani 8'; Bertacca 9', 10'; Sassari 15'; Creciun 24' (o.g.); Fazzini 27'; Reggio 30'	Referee: Vladimir Tashkov (Bulgaria)

9 September 2026	Denmark	8–4	Moldova
15:30	Madsen 3'; Hansen 9'; Damm 22'; Wegeberg 24'; Levin 29'; Jensen 31', 33'; De Fries 32'	Report	Istrati 9'; Turta 24'; Eremia 27'; Stăvilă 33'	Referee: Angelika Gębka (Poland)

9 September 2026	Italy	9–3	Germany
18:00	Josep Jr. 2', 9', 14', 34'; Bertacca 3'; Andriani 6'; Sassari 18'; Shalabi 35'; Fazzini 36'	Report	Vasilets 14'; Meier 15'; Peterson 32'	Referee: Dario Minder (Switzerland)

11 September 2026	Germany	4–5 (a.e.t.)	Moldova
11:30	Vasilets 12'; Baaske 22'; Peterson 25', 27'	Report	Creciun 12', 18', 37'; Sîrghi 15'; Stăvilă 27'	Referee: Mehdi Sayoud (Belgium)

11 September 2026	Italy	7–2	Denmark
18:00	Giordani 3', 13', 13', 23', 27', 31'; Genovali 36'	Report	Jensen 7'; Frandsen 34'	Referee: Alicia Galán (Spain)

==== Group B ====
Pos	Team	Pld	W	W+	WP	L	GF	GA	GD	Pts
1	Spain	3	3	0	0	0	25	21	+4	9
2	Switzerland	3	2	0	0	1	25	20	+5	6
3	Portugal	3	1	0	0	2	11	15	−4	3
4	Belarus	3	0	0	0	3	14	19	−5	0

8 September 2026	Portugal	4–1	Belarus
15:15	Tim 20', 24'; R. Brilhante 22', 26'	Report	Ryabko 21'	Referee: Matthieu Dor (France)

8 September 2026	Switzerland	10–11	Spain
16:45	Y. Knöpfli 3', 10'; Hodel 8', 27', 31'; J. Knöpfli 10', 14', 15'; Reber 11'; Ott 14'	Report	Ramy 1', 2'; Chiky Ardil 7', 11', 22', 25'; D. Ardil 10'; Suli Batis 14', 16'; Gatica 15'; Cassano 25'	Referee: Moreno Longo (Italy)

10 September 2026	Portugal	3–8	Switzerland
15:30	Léo Martins 2'; Bê Martins 13'; A. Lourenço 32'	Report	Y. Knöpfli 7'; Ott 14'; Steinemann 19'; Rodrigues 20'; Borer 23', 30'; J. Knöpfli 31', 34'	Referee: Vladimir Tashkov (Bulgaria)

10 September 2026	Spain	8–7	Belarus
16:45	Ramy 8', 14', 19', 23'; Suli Batis 16', 34'; Chiky Ardil 17'; Pablo 32'	Report	Drozd 4'; Chaikouski 8', 12'; Bryshtsel 13', 28', 35'; Ryabko 16'	Referee: Matthieu Dor (France)

11 September 2026	Belarus	6–7	Switzerland
14:00	Ryabko 7', 21'; Hardzetski 10', 10'; Avgustov 26'; Drozd 33'	Report	Hodel 10', 35'; Borer 13', 24', 31'; Steinemann 28'; J. Knöpfli 35'	Referee: Vitalij Gomolko (Lithuania)

11 September 2026	Spain	6–4	Portugal
16:45	Ramy 5', 14'; Suli Batis 6'; Gatica 28'; Brian 30'; José Oliver 36'	Report	Tim 5'; Léo Martins 6'; D. Algarvio 23'; Bê Martins 33'

=== Knockout stage ===
==== Semi-finals ====
===== 5th–8th place =====
12 September 2026
11:30

Portugal	8–5	Germany
Bê Martins 2'; R. Brilhante 11'; Léo Martins 18', 27', 31'; D. Algarvio 28'; Fábio 30'; Tim 34'	Report	Schulte 1', 32'; Meier 11', 22'; Peterson 21'

Referee: Fiammetta Susanna (Italy)

12 September 2026
12:45

Moldova	1–6	Belarus
Beșelea 15'	Report	Ryabko 13', 25'; Bryshtsel 17', 36'; Chaikouski 31'; Piatrouski 32'

Referee: Moreno Longo (Italy)

===== 1st–4th place =====
12 September 2026
15:30

Spain	8–3	Denmark
Chiky Ardil 6'; Pablo 7'; Suli Batis 18'; Damm 20' (o.g.); Kuman 29'; Ramy 31'; José Oliver 32'; Joselito 35'	Report	Pilgaard 12'; Wegeberg 18'; De Fries 27'

Referee: Mehdi Sayoud (Belgium)

12 September 2026
18:00

Italy	10–4	Switzerland
Casapieri 6', 25'; Sassari 12'; Giordani 13', 14'; Josep Jr. 14', 31'; Sciacca 15' (pen.); Bertacca 26'; Reggio 36'	Report	Ott 9', 19'; Giordani 15' (o.g.); Hodel 18'

Referee: Sérgio Soares (Portugal)

==== Finals ====
===== 7th place match =====
13 September 2026
12:30

Moldova	3–2	Germany
Beșelea 2', 31'; Turta 8' (pen.)	Report	Olli 30', 31'

Referee: Matthieu Dor (France)

===== 5th place match =====
13 September 2026
11:15

Belarus	3–2 (a.e.t.)	Portugal
Novikau 34'; Chaikouski 37'; Bryshtsel 37'	Report	A. Lourenço 14'; Léo Martins 39'

Referee: Davide Innaurato (Italy)

===== 3rd place match =====
13 September 2026
15:15

Denmark	8–8 (a.e.t.)	Switzerland
De Fries 4', 23', 29', 35', 36', 39'; Jensen 21'; Wegeberg 24'	Report	Mounoud 1', 30'; Borer 13', 27'; Spaccarotella 17'; Y. Knöpfli 28'; J. Knöpfli 33'; Hodel 39'
Penalties
Damm (penalty scored); Jensen (penalty scored); Wegeberg (penalty scored); Madsen (penalty scored); Frandsen (penalty scored); Hansen (penalty scored); Levin (penalty scored); Lucht (penalty scored); Pilgaard (penalty scored); De Fries (penalty scored); Wegeberg (penalty scored)	11–12	(penalty scored) Borer; (penalty scored) Hodel; (penalty scored) Spaccarotella; (penalty scored) Y. Knöpfli; (penalty scored) Reber; (penalty scored) Mounoud; (penalty scored) Capozzolo; (penalty scored) Ott; (penalty scored) J. Knöpfli; (penalty scored) Y. Knöpfli; (penalty scored) Borer; (penalty scored) Hodel

Referee: Alicia Galán (Spain)

===== Championship match =====
13 September 2026
18:00

Italy	2–5	Spain
Josep Jr. 10'; Bertacca 15'	Report	José Oliver 1', 35'; Ramy 18', 32'; Brian 31'

Referee: Vladimir Tashkov (Bulgaria)

=== Awards ===
==== Winners trophy ====
2026 Euro Beach Soccer League
Champions

Spain
Sixth title

==== Individual awards ====
Top scorer(s)
(Spain) Ramy Saghdani
11 goals
Best player
(Italy) Josep Junior
Best goalkeeper
(Spain) Pablo López

=== Final standings ===
Pos	Team	Result
1	Spain	EBSL Champions (6th title)
2	Italy	Runners-up
3	Switzerland	Third place
4	Denmark	
5	Belarus	
6	Portugal	
7	Moldova	
8	Germany	

== See also ==
- 2026 Women's Euro Beach Soccer League
