= Denmark national beach soccer team =

National beach soccer team

Denmark
- Confederation: UEFA (Europe)
- Head coach: Casper Dorph Jørgensen
- Captain: Rasmus Lucht
- Top scorer: Axel Damm (79)
- Home stadium: Ryparkens Idrætsanlæg
- FIFA code: DEN
- BSWW ranking: 28 (1 June 2026)
First colours
Second colours

First international
- Brazil 7–1 Denmark (Rio de Janeiro, Brazil; 30 January 1996)

Biggest win
- Denmark 13–3 Andorra (Siofok, Hungary; 13 August 2017)

Biggest defeat
- Hungary 16–2 Denmark (Siofok, Hungary; 12 August 2017)

World Cup
- Appearances: 1 (first in 1996)
- Best result: 6th place

Euro Beach Soccer League
- Appearances: 9 (first in 2016)
- Best result: Runners-up, regular phase, Division A (2026)

Denmark national beach soccer team represents Denmark in international beach soccer competitions, but is not controlled by the Danish Football Association (DFA), the governing body for football in Denmark. The DFA have decided to wait before being affiliated with an official national beach soccer team. However the team is recognised by the sport's governing body, Beach Soccer Worldwide (BSWW) and competes as Denmark's representative team in BSWW and FIFA sanctioned tournaments.

Denmark made an early entrance onto the international beach soccer scene by competing in the 1996 World Championship, finishing 6th out of 8 teams. At the tournament, played on Copacabana in Rio de Janeiro, Denmark's squad included former Ballon d'Or winner Allan Simonsen and lost 1–7 to Brazil. However a Danish team did not return to internationals for 17 years until 2013 to compete in a BSWW Tour event in Sweden. In 2016, Denmark committed a team to multiple events in the beach soccer calendar for the first time, debuting in both the Euro Beach Soccer League and World Cup qualifiers.

Since then, Danish beach soccer has progressed to the sport's top international tier: the squad has reached Division A of the Euro Beach Soccer League Superfinal, contested among Europe's eight leading nations. Danish players have regularly been nominated for individual honours at the Beach Soccer Stars awards. Axel Damm was shortlisted for the Best Men's Player award in four consecutive years, from 2022 to 2025; the team's head coach and former captain, Casper Dorph Jørgensen, was shortlisted for the same award in 2022 and 2023; goalkeeper Gustav Madsen was shortlisted for Best Men's Player in 2023 and for Best Men's Goalkeeper in 2024, before winning the Rising Star award later in 2024; and forward Carl Oscar Wegeberg was shortlisted for Best Men's Player in 2025. From 2023 to 2026 the team was coached by the Spaniard Llorenç Gómez, who had himself been voted the world's best player at the 2018 Beach Soccer Stars awards and was shortlisted for the 2025 Best Coach award during his spell in charge of Denmark.

== Recent history ==
Denmark competed in Division A of the Euro Beach Soccer League in 2024, finishing third at the opening stage in Tirrenia, Italy, but ending the season 12th and last after the Superfinal in Alghero. In October 2024 the team played in the European qualifying tournament for the 2025 FIFA Beach Soccer World Cup in Cádiz, Spain, where they beat Czechia twice, Moldova, and Italy after extra time, but were eliminated in the second group stage. At the 2025 Superfinal in Viareggio Denmark finished 7th of 8, winning the seventh-place play-off 5–4 against France with a golden goal.

Casper Dorph Jørgensen, who had captained the side for five years, took over as head coach ahead of the 2026 season. A co-founder of Copenhagen BSC, he coaches the team unpaid; as the squad is not funded by the Danish Football Association, it relies on sponsorship and grants. The sport is organised nationally in Denmark by Strandfodbold Danmark, founded in 2025. Training is further constrained by winter weather: with only three indoor sand halls in the country, the squad has trained on frozen pitches wrapped in plastic film and neoprene socks to stay warm, prompting the 2026 formation of the multi-sport Dansk Strand Alliance, which aims to expand indoor training capacity. Players otherwise cover most of their own costs, a situation the coach has likened to "sending a Series 5 team to play the Champions League". In April 2026 Denmark finished as runners-up at the El Salvador Beach Soccer Cup in San Salvador, beating hosts El Salvador 3–2 and Colombia 3–1 either side of a 10–3 defeat to Brazil, with Axel Damm finishing as the tournament's joint top scorer. Damm, who has scored 79 goals via scissor kicks over his career, has attracted loan interest from clubs elsewhere in Europe and South America.

Later in 2026 Denmark reached the final of the Euro Beach Soccer League regular phase for the first time. Unbeaten in the group stage in Chișinău, Moldova, they beat the hosts 4–0 in the semi-final before losing the final 4–3 after extra time to Italy on 2 August 2026; goalkeeper Gustav Ravn Madsen was named the tournament's best goalkeeper. The result secured a place at the Superfinal in Viareggio, held 8–13 September 2026, where Denmark were drawn in Group A with Italy, Germany and Moldova.

Squad member Ole Hansen, from Randers, has described his first cap for the team as an experience in Italy he said he would never forget.

Goalkeeper Gustav Madsen, who took up the sport during the COVID-19 pandemic, became the first goalkeeper to win the Rising Star award at the Beach Soccer Stars Gala in Dubai in February 2024.

== Player records ==
- Most goals in a single match: six, by Villads De Fries Emborg, in an 8–8 draw against Switzerland (Switzerland won 12–11 on penalties) at the Euro Beach Soccer League Superfinal third-place play-off in Viareggio, Italy, on 13 September 2026.
- Fastest hat-trick: Axel Damm, who scored three goals – all scissor (bicycle) kicks – in just over two minutes during the third period of a 7–1 win over Norway at the FIFA Beach Soccer World Cup UAE 2024 Baku European Pre-Qualifier, on 2 July 2023.
- Youngest player: Carl Oscar Wegeberg, who was 17 years and 341 days old when he made his debut against Luxembourg on 28 June 2019, having been born on 22 July 2001.

== Players statistics ==
Statistics correct as of September 2026, except for Henrik Rædkjær, Casper Dorph Jørgensen, Dennis Dorph and Rasmus Lyng, whose caps and goals are as last recorded in September 2023, before they left the squad; Oskar Jørgensen's goal tally has been corrected to the number verifiable from goalscorer records in this article's match history.

No.	Pos.	Name	Age	Caps	Goals	Active
1	GK	Oliver Levin	25 December 1997 (age 28)	57	7	Yes
2	DF	Lukas Frandsen	26 January 1999 (age 27)	47	26	Yes
5	MF	Oskar Jørgensen	22 July 1998 (age 28)	34	8	Yes
6	MF	Carl Oscar Wegeberg (vice-captain)	22 July 2001 (age 25)	58	41	Yes
10	MF	Axel Damm	14 September 1996 (age 30)	84	79	Yes
12	FW	Rasmus Lucht (captain)	8 April 1983 (age 43)	15	10	Yes
21	GK	Gustav Madsen	17 July 2001 (age 25)	41	34	Yes
22	FW	Klaus Ryding	22 November 1982 (age 43)	43	6	Yes
	FW	Bertram Jensen	20 January 2004 (age 22)	22	8	Yes
	FW	Villads De Fries Emborg	25 June 2006 (age 20)	12	11	Yes
	FW	Ole Hansen	22 March 2004 (age 22)	20	7	Yes
	FW	Tobias Pilgaard	12 July 2004 (age 22)	21	8	Yes
	DF	Felix Schmidt	20 June 2002 (age 24)	10	4	Yes
	FW	Laurits Stubgaard Jørgensen	29 March 2001 (age 25)	10	6	Yes
	FW	Jacob Hoedeman	13 September 1996 (age 30)	10	6	Yes
7	DF	Casper Dorph Jørgensen	22 February 1989 (age 37)	51	14	No
8	MF	Dennis Dorph	10 September 1980 (age 46)	39	4	No
9	FW	Henrik Rædkjær	5 July 1987 (age 39)	52	39	No
11	FW	Rasmus Lyng	8 May 1984 (age 42)	42	6	No

Head Coach: Casper Dorph Jørgensen
Assistant Coach: Terry Bowes
Mental Coach: Brian Easler
Goalkeeper Coach: Diego Garrido Gómez
Physiotherapist: Federico Rossin
Staff: Luca Malinconico
Staff: Nicoló Rossetti

== Achievements ==
- Beach Soccer World Championship best: 6th place
  - 1996
- Euro Beach Soccer League best: runners-up, regular phase, Division A (2026)
  - 2016 position: 13th place, Division B
  - 2017 position: 13th place, Division B
  - 2018 position: 12th place, Division B
  - 2019 position: 13th place, Division B
  - 2022 position: 7th place, Division B
  - 2023 position: 8th place, Division A
  - 2024 position: 12th place, Division A
  - 2025 position: 7th place, Division A
  - 2026 position: runners-up in the regular phase, Division A; qualified for the Superfinal
- FIFA Beach Soccer World Cup qualification (UEFA) best: 5th/6th place
  - 2016 position: none
  - 2021 position: 13th place
  - 2023 position: 5th/6th place
  - 2025 position: eliminated in the second group stage
- El Salvador Beach Soccer Cup best: runners-up
  - 2026 position: runners-up

== World ranking ==
Denmark's BSWW World Ranking over time. A lower number indicates a better ranking. Raw data

== Results ==
=== All-time record ===
Correct as of September 2026

Tournament	Pld	W	W+	L	GF	GA	Dif	Pts
Beach Soccer World Championship	3	1	0	2	10	16	–6	3
BSWW Tour matches	6	1	0	5	22	31	–9	3
Euro Beach Soccer League	54	20	4	34	211	240	–29	64
FIFA Beach Soccer World Cup qualification (UEFA)	23	12	1	11	82	110	–28	35
Total	86	34	5	52	325	397	–72	105

=== 1996 ===
1996 matches

30 January 1996 1996 World Championship, Group stage	Brazil	7–1	Denmark	Rio de Janeiro, Brazil

31 January 1996 1996 World Championship, Group stage	Uruguay	5–3	Denmark	Rio de Janeiro, Brazil

1 February 1996 1996 World Championship, Group stage	Denmark	6–4	Canada	Rio de Janeiro, Brazil

=== 2013 ===
2013 matches

12 July 2013 BSWW Tour: Sweden Cup	England	4–1	Denmark	Malmö, Sweden

13 July 2013 BSWW Tour: Sweden Cup	Sweden	6–8	Denmark	Malmö, Sweden

14 July 2013 BSWW Tour: Sweden Cup	Netherlands	6–2	Denmark	Malmö, Sweden

=== 2016 ===
2016 matches

24 June 2016 BSWW Tour: Central European Cup	Czech Republic	5–3	Denmark	Prague, Czech Republic
	Kovarik; Kovarik; Boček; Kovarik; Salak		Madsen; Madsen; Henrik Rædkjær

25 June 2016 BSWW Tour: Central European Cup	Austria	6–5	Denmark	Prague, Czech Republic
	Gahleitner; Peterstorfer; Cetinyürek; Steinbeiß; Cetinyürek; Mayr		Klaus Ryding; Henrik Rædkjær; Henrik Rædkjær; Ytte; Wiese

26 June 2016 BSWW Tour: Central European Cup	Slovakia	4–3	Denmark	Prague, Czech Republic
	Kanyai; Kostoláni; Kostoláni; Bureš		Henrik Rædkjær; Ytte; Henrik Rædkjær

12 August 2016 2016 EBSL, Div. B	Denmark	5–9	Hungary	Siófok, Hungary
18:30	Raedkjaer; Vigilsen Wiese; Olsen	Report(ru)	Fekete; Simonyi; Balazs; Sebestyen; Szentes-Biro; Turos; Besenyei	Referee: Eduards Borisevics (Latvia)

13 August 2016 2016 EBSL, Div. B	Azerbaijan	3–2	Denmark	Siófok, Hungary
12:15	Baghirov; Sultanov; Allahguliyev	Report(ru)	Raedkjaer; Larsen	Referee: Laurynas Arzuolaitis (Lithuania)

14 August 2016 2016 EBSL, Div. B	Bulgaria	5–4	Denmark	Siófok, Hungary
10:45	Filipov; Parashkevov; Tsvetkov; Velikov	Report(ru)	Raedkjaer; Olsen	Referee: Emmanuel Vocale (Belgium)

=== 2017 ===
2017 matches

2 September 2016 2017 FIFA BS World Cup qualifiers	Denmark	2–10	Spain	Jesolo, Italy
14:15	Bonde; Madsen	Report(ru)	Merida; Martin Lima; Chiky; Cintas; Molina Suarez	Referee: Roman Borisov (Russia)

5 September 2016 2017 FIFA BS World Cup qualifiers	Poland	5–1	Denmark	Jesolo, Italy
11:30	Saganowski; Jesionowski; Stasiak; Gac; Madani	Report(ru)	Madsen	Referee: Csaba Baghy (Hungary)

6 September 2016 2017 FIFA BS World Cup qualifiers	Estonia	7–1	Denmark	Jesolo, Italy
14:00	Mäerog; Rump; Munskind; Marmor	Report(ru)	Oster	Referee: Thorsten Günther (Germany)

11 August 2017 2017 EBSL, Div. B	Denmark	5–10	Bulgaria	Siófok, Hungary
14:30	Lyng; Storm; Rædkjær; C.D. Jørgensen; C.H. Jørgensen	Report(ru)	Filipov; Adamov; Martinov; Lozanov	Referee: Ago Kärtmann (Estonia)

12 August 2017 2017 EBSL, Div. B	Hungary	16–2	Denmark	Siófok, Hungary
18:15	Besenyei; Túrós; Fekete; Szacksó; Genczler; Szentes-Bíró; Rutai	Report(ru)	Fekete; Rædkjær	Referee: Richard de Bruijn (Netherlands)

13 August 2017 2017 EBSL, Div. B	Denmark	13–3	Andorra	Siófok, Hungary
13:15	Rædkjær; C.D. Jørgensen; Ryding; Olsen	Report(ru)	Neira; Regalo	Referee: Laszlo Legeza (Hungary)

8 September 2017 2017 International Friendlies	Denmark	2–10	Norway	Ryparken, Denmark
18:30				Stadium: Ryparkens Idrætsanlæg

=== 2018 ===
2018 matches

24 August 2018 2018 EBSL, Div. B	England	5–1	Denmark	Warnemünde, Germany
13:45	Clarke; O'Rourke	Report(ru)	Khattab	Referee: Torsten Guenther (Germany)

25 August 2018 2018 EBSL, Div. B	Hungary	7–4	Denmark	Warnemünde, Germany
15:15	Rutai; Fekete; Szentes-Biro; Besenyei; Menyhei	Report(ru)	Damm; Jorgensen	Referee: Malte Gerhardt (Germany)

26 August 2018 2018 EBSL, Div. B	Denmark	5–4	Georgia	Warnemünde, Germany
12:45	Lindberg-Levin; Khattab; Jorgensen	Report(ru)	Pargalava; Chanturia	Referee: Torsten Guenther (Germany)

=== 2019 ===
2019 matches

28 June 2019 2019 International Friendlies	Denmark	7–3	Luxembourg	Ryparken, Denmark
18:00	Henrik Rædkjær; Dennis Dorph Jørgensen; Axel Damm; Casper Dorph Jørgensen; Carl Oscar Wegeberg			Stadium: Ryparkens Idrætsanlæg

29 June 2019 2019 International Friendlies	Denmark	10–5	Luxembourg	Ryparken, Denmark
13:00	Dennis Dorph Jørgensen; Axel Damm; Frederik Kjøbek Klausen; Henrik Rædkjær			Stadium: Ryparkens Idrætsanlæg

5 July 2019 2019 EBSL, Div. B (Group 1)	Norway	4-1	Denmark	Nazaré, Portugal
12:30	Tom Rune Sørensen; Henrik Salveson; Pak-ling Li		Casper Dorph Jørgensen	Stadium: Estadio Do Beach Soccer; Attendance: 100; Referee: Oezcan Soltanoglu, Atila Balint

6 July 2019 2019 EBSL, Div. B (Group 1)	Bulgaria	4-3	Denmark	Nazaré, Portugal
11:45	Filip Filipov; Casper Dorph Jørgensen (o.g.)		Casper Dorph Jørgensen; Frederik Kjøbek Klausen	Stadium: Estadio Do Beach Soccer; Attendance: 100; Referee: Francisco Henriques Costa, Antonio Pereyra Almeida

7 July 2019 2019 EBSL, Div. B (Group 1)	Denmark	4-2	Georgia	Nazaré, Portugal
11:45	Axel Damm; Henrik Rædkjær; Frederik Kjøbek Klausen		Gocha Makharadze} Ваха Иваниадзе	Stadium: Estadio Do Beach Soccer; Attendance: 100; Referee: Jesus Garrido, Emmanuel Vocale

18 August 2019 2019 International Friendlies	Switzerland	14-4	Denmark	Spiez, Switzerland
15.00			Rasmus Lyng; Casper Dorph Jørgensen; Axel Damm	Stadium: Beach Arena Spiez; Attendance: 300

7 September 2019 2019 Goalfun CFA China-Latin America Championship	Uruguay	4-1	Denmark	Tangshan, China
11:30			Dennis Dorph

8 September 2019 2019 Goalfun CFA China-Latin America Championship	El Salvador	6-2	Denmark	Tangshan, China
09:00			Axel Damm; Carl Oscar Wegeberg

9 September 2019 2019 Goalfun CFA China-Latin America Championship	Denmark	2-2 (3-2)	Bahamas	Tangshan, China
09:00	Axel Damm

10 September 2019 2019 Goalfun CFA China-Latin America Championship	Denmark	2-3	Trinidad and Tobago	Tangshan, China
09:00	Oskar Jørgensen; Carl Oscar Wegeberg

11 September 2019 2019 Goalfun CFA China-Latin America Championship	China	1-2	Denmark	Tangshan, China
11:30			Axel Damm; Henrik Rædkjær

=== 2021 ===
2021 matches

17 June 2021 2021 FIFA Beach Soccer World Cup qualification (UEFA)	Kazakhstan	5-6	Denmark	Nazaré, Portugal
10:00			Henrik Rædkjær; Casper Dorph; Axel Damm

18 June 2021 2021 FIFA Beach Soccer World Cup qualification (UEFA)	Lithuania	2-3	Denmark	Nazaré, Portugal
10:00			Henrik Rædkjær; Axel Damm; Oliver Levin

21 June 2021 2021 FIFA Beach Soccer World Cup qualification (UEFA)	Germany	8-0	Denmark	Nazaré, Portugal
12:45

22 June 2021 2021 FIFA Beach Soccer World Cup qualification (UEFA)	Italy	12-0	Denmark	Nazaré, Portugal
18:15

23 June 2021 2021 FIFA Beach Soccer World Cup qualification (UEFA)	Denmark	3-4	Romania	Nazaré, Portugal
12:45	Axel Damm; Carl Oscar Wegeberg

24 June 2021 2021 FIFA Beach Soccer World Cup qualification (UEFA)	Denmark	5-3	Norway	Nazaré, Portugal
16:45	Axel Damm; Lukas Frandsen; Mik Skøtt

25 June 2021 2021 FIFA Beach Soccer World Cup qualification (UEFA)	Estonia	6-7	Denmark	Nazaré, Portugal
11:15			Casper Dorph; Axel Damm; Lukas Frandsen

=== 2022 ===
2022 matches

20 May 2022 2022 Spring Cup	Denmark	5-3	Estonia	Pärnu, Estonia
18:00	Axel Damm; Carl Oscar Wegeberg; Lukas Frandsen

21 May 2022 2022 Spring Cup	Denmark	5-3	Latvia	Pärnu, Estonia
14:30	Carl Oscar Wegeberg; Gustav Madsen; Axel Damm; Oskar Jørgensen

22 May 2022 2022 Spring Cup	Denmark	5-4	Czech Republic	Pärnu, Estonia
10:00	Gustav Madsen; Carl Oscar Wegeberg; Axel Damm; Casper Dorph

27 July 2022 2022 Euro Beach Soccer League	Lithuania	3-12	Denmark	Chișinău, Moldova
13:15			Oliver Levin; Lukas Frandsen; Axel Damm; Oskar Jørgensen; Casper Dorph; Carl Oscar Wegeberg; Henrik Rædkjær

28 July 2022 2022 Euro Beach Soccer League	Turkey	0-0 (1-0 a.e.t)	Denmark	Chișinău, Moldova
17:15

29 July 2022 2022 Euro Beach Soccer League	Denmark	1-1 (1-2 a.e.t)	Latvia	Chișinău, Moldova
13:15	Axel Damm

30 July 2022 2022 Euro Beach Soccer League	Latvia	1-1 (3-1 a.e.t)	Denmark	Chișinău, Moldova
14:30			Gustav Madsen

31 July 2022 2022 Euro Beach Soccer League	Denmark	3-2	England	Chișinău, Moldova
14:30	Casper Dorph; Carl Oscar Wegeberg; Henrik Rædkjær

=== 2023 ===
2023 matches

2 July 2023 2023 FIFA Beach Soccer World Cup qualification (UEFA)	Norway	1-7	Denmark	Baku, Azerbaijan
19:30			Axel Damm; Klaus Ryding; Gustav Madsen; Henrik Rædkjær

3 July 2023 2023 FIFA Beach Soccer World Cup qualification (UEFA)	Greece	1-3	Denmark	Baku, Azerbaijan
18:15			Gustav Madsen; Lukas Frandsen; Casper Dorph

6 July 2023 2023 FIFA Beach Soccer World Cup qualification (UEFA)	Denmark	3-2	Switzerland	Baku, Azerbaijan
16:15	Gustav Madsen; Lukas Frandsen

7 July 2023 2023 FIFA Beach Soccer World Cup qualification (UEFA)	Belarus	8-2	Denmark	Baku, Azerbaijan
11:00			Axel Damm; Lukas Frandsen

8 July 2023 2023 FIFA Beach Soccer World Cup qualification (UEFA)	Turkey	4-7	Denmark	Baku, Azerbaijan
11:00			Axel Damm; Carl Oscar Wegeberg; Henrik Rædkjær; Gustav Madsen; Casper Dorph

10 July 2023 2023 FIFA Beach Soccer World Cup qualification (UEFA)	Portugal	8-3	Denmark	Baku, Azerbaijan
17:30			Axel Damm; Henrik Rædkjær; Lukas Frandsen

1 August 2023 2023 International Friendlies	Switzerland	7-1	Denmark	Aarau, Switzerland
11:00			Gustav Madsen

9 September 2023 2023 International Friendlies	Denmark	1-4	Germany	Marielyst, Denmark
14:30	Carl Oscar Wegeberg			Attendance: 288

10 September 2023 2023 International Friendlies	Denmark	4-4 (5-5 a.e.t) (1-4 a.p)	Germany	Marielyst, Denmark
13:00	Gustav Madsen; Axel Damm; Casper Dorph; Henrik Rædkjær			Attendance: 193

19 September 2023 2023 Euro Beach Soccer League	Denmark	4-10	Portugal	Alghero, Italy
16:45	Axel Damm; Gustav Madsen; Rasmus Lyng

20 September 2023 2023 Euro Beach Soccer League	France	2-2 (3-5 a.p)	Denmark	Alghero, Italy
18:00			Axel Damm; Casper Dorph

21 September 2023 2023 Euro Beach Soccer League	Estonia	3-3 (4-5 a.p)	Denmark	Alghero, Italy
10:15			Axel Damm; Casper Dorph; Gustav Madsen

21 September 2023 2023 Euro Beach Soccer League	Spain	9-5	Denmark	Alghero, Italy
12:45			Axel Damm; Carl Oscar Wegeberg; Gustav Madsen; Oskar Jørgensen; Lukas Frandsen

23 September 2023 2023 Euro Beach Soccer League	Switzerland	7-5	Denmark	Alghero, Italy
09:00			Carl Oscar Wegeberg; Axel Damm; Gustav Madsen	Referee: Francisco De Oses Bumedien

24 September 2023 2023 Euro Beach Soccer League	Germany	6-5	Denmark	Alghero, Italy
11:30			Axel Damm; Carl Oscar Wegeberg; Engelhardt (o.g.)	Referee: Vitalij Gomolko

=== 2024 ===
2024 matches

3 July 2024 2024 Euro Beach Soccer League	Czech Republic	1–4	Denmark	Tirrenia, Italy
17:00			Lukas Frandsen; Carl Oscar Wegeberg; Wagner; Axel Damm	Referee: Raffaele Delvecchio

4 July 2024 2024 Euro Beach Soccer League	Denmark	6–2	Estonia	Tirrenia, Italy
21:00	Casper Dorph; Oskar Jørgensen; Wagner; Axel Damm; Felix Schmidt; Thomson (o.g.)			Referee: Tomáš Nejedlý

5 July 2024 2024 Euro Beach Soccer League	Italy	3–1	Denmark	Tirrenia, Italy
18:00			Gustav Madsen	Referee: Sergio Moreno Romero

6 July 2024 2024 Euro Beach Soccer League	Denmark	3–4	Switzerland	Tirrenia, Italy
16:30	Axel Damm; Casper Dorph; Jacob Hoedeman

7 July 2024 2024 Euro Beach Soccer League	Romania	3–10	Denmark	Tirrenia, Italy
17:00			Rasmus Lucht; Lukas Frandsen; Carl Oscar Wegeberg; Gustav Madsen; Wagner; Casper Dorph; Oskar Jørgensen; Jacob Hoedeman	Referee: Luca Romani

31 August 2024 Friendly	Denmark	11–1	Norway	Copenhagen, Denmark
	Oskar Jørgensen; Henrik Rædkjær; Axel Damm; Carl Oscar Wegeberg; Oliver Levin; Lukas Frandsen; Jacob Hoedeman; Rasmus Lucht		Stian Rasch	Stadium: Ryparken

10 September 2024 2024 Euro Beach Soccer League	Poland	4–1	Denmark	Alghero, Italy
09:00			Carl Oscar Wegeberg	Referee: Matthieu Dor

11 September 2024 2024 Euro Beach Soccer League	Portugal	4–1	Denmark	Alghero, Italy
15:30			Oliver Levin	Referee: Alejandro Ojaos

12 September 2024 2024 Euro Beach Soccer League	Denmark	1–2	Czech Republic	Alghero, Italy
09:00	Gustav Madsen			Referee: Vladimir Tashkov

14 September 2024 2024 Euro Beach Soccer League	France	5–3	Denmark	Alghero, Italy
11:30			Jacob Hoedeman; Carl Oscar Wegeberg; Casper Dorph	Referee: Fiammetta Susanna

4 October 2024 2025 FIFA Beach Soccer World Cup qualification (UEFA)	Czech Republic	0–6	Denmark	Cádiz, Spain
12:45			Gustav Madsen; Laurits Stubgaard; Felix Schmidt; Rasmus Lucht	Referee: Vladimir Tashkov

5 October 2024 2025 FIFA Beach Soccer World Cup qualification (UEFA)	Italy	6–3	Denmark	Cádiz, Spain
16:45			Gustav Madsen; Lukas Frandsen; Rasmus Lucht	Referee: Aurélien Planchais-Godefroy

8 October 2024 2025 FIFA Beach Soccer World Cup qualification (UEFA)	Denmark	10–3	Czech Republic	Cádiz, Spain
12:45	Axel Damm; Casper Dorph; Lukas Frandsen; Laurits Stubgaard; Rasmus Lucht; Brizze			Referee: Sergio Gomes

9 October 2024 2025 FIFA Beach Soccer World Cup qualification (UEFA)	Denmark	4–3	Moldova	Cádiz, Spain
09:00	Casper Dorph; Lukas Frandsen; Rasmus Lucht; Carl Oscar Wegeberg			Referee: Alejandro Ojaos

10 October 2024 2025 FIFA Beach Soccer World Cup qualification (UEFA)	Denmark	3–2 (a.e.t.)	Italy	Cádiz, Spain
15:30	Axel Damm; Casper Dorph; Bertacca (o.g.)			Referee: Eduards Borisevics

11 October 2024 2025 FIFA Beach Soccer World Cup qualification (UEFA)	Denmark	2–4	Switzerland	Cádiz, Spain
15:30	Axel Damm; Laurits Stubgaard			Referee: Matthieu Dor

12 October 2024 2025 FIFA Beach Soccer World Cup qualification (UEFA)	Belarus	6–1	Denmark	Cádiz, Spain
16:45			Gustav Madsen	Referee: Vladimir Tashkov

=== 2025 ===
2025 matches

25 July 2025 2025 Euro Beach Soccer League	Denmark	1–5	Italy	Castellammare di Stabia, Italy
20:30	Lukas Frandsen			Referee: Attila Balint

26 July 2025 2025 Euro Beach Soccer League	Czech Republic	2–3	Denmark	Castellammare di Stabia, Italy
15:00			Carl Oscar Wegeberg; Bertram Jensen; Casper Dorph	Referee: Moreno Francesco Longo

27 July 2025 2025 Euro Beach Soccer League	Estonia	4–6	Denmark	Castellammare di Stabia, Italy
17:45			Carl Oscar Wegeberg; Axel Damm; Rasmus Lucht; Lukas Frandsen	Referee: Fiammetta Susanna

1 August 2025 2025 Euro Beach Soccer League	Denmark	3–2	Moldova	Chișinău, Moldova
20:00	Rasmus Lucht; Tobias Pilgaard; Jacob Hoedeman			Referee: Matthieu Dor

2 August 2025 2025 Euro Beach Soccer League	Spain	5–4	Denmark	Chișinău, Moldova
15:30			Axel Damm; Jacob Hoedeman; Rasmus Lucht; Lukas Frandsen	Referee: Jurijs Ivušins

3 August 2025 2025 Euro Beach Soccer League	Poland	4–1	Denmark	Chișinău, Moldova
17:00			Axel Damm	Referee: Matthieu Dor

9 September 2025 2025 Euro Beach Soccer League	Denmark	5–7	Spain	Viareggio, Italy
15:30	Axel Damm; Carl Oscar Wegeberg; Ole Hansen			Referee: Sérgio Gomes Soares

11 September 2025 2025 Euro Beach Soccer League	Switzerland	6–2	Denmark	Viareggio, Italy
15:30			Klaus Ryding; Bertram Jensen	Referee: Vitalij Gomolko

12 September 2025 2025 Euro Beach Soccer League	Ukraine	6–6 (6–5 a.p)	Denmark	Viareggio, Italy
11:30			Gustav Madsen; Bertram Jensen; Laurits Stubgaard; Axel Damm; Carl Oscar Wegeberg	Referee: Malte Gerhardt

14 September 2025 2025 Euro Beach Soccer League	France	4–5 (a.e.t.)	Denmark	Viareggio, Italy
10:15			Ole Hansen; Gustav Madsen; Tobias Pilgaard; Casper Dorph; Gosselin (o.g.)	Referee: Malte Gerhardt

30 August 2025 Friendly	Denmark	7–4	Sweden	Copenhagen, Denmark
	Lukas Frandsen; Brizze; Casper Dorph; Rædkjær			Stadium: Ryparken

=== 2026 ===
2026 matches

2 April 2026 2026 El Salvador Beach Soccer Cup	Denmark	3–2	El Salvador	San Salvador, El Salvador
20:00	Axel Damm; Gustav Madsen			Referee: Juan Andrés Ángeles Fernández

3 April 2026 2026 El Salvador Beach Soccer Cup	Brazil	10–3	Denmark	San Salvador, El Salvador
17:00			Axel Damm; Carl Oscar Wegeberg	Referee: David Ernesto Cruz Trinidad

4 April 2026 2026 El Salvador Beach Soccer Cup	Colombia	1–3	Denmark	San Salvador, El Salvador
17:00			Ole Hansen; Tobias Pilgaard	Referee: Gonzalo Yurandir Carballo Pérez

9 May 2026 Friendly	Denmark	5–1	Lithuania	Copenhagen, Denmark
	Felix Schmidt; Laurits Stubgaard Jørgensen; Own goal Wyrozemski; Villads De Fries Emborg			Stadium: Ryparken

10 May 2026 Friendly	Denmark	6–4	Lithuania	Copenhagen, Denmark
	Axel Damm; Gustav Madsen; Bertram Rosendal; Ole Hansen			Stadium: Ryparken

29 July 2026 2026 Euro Beach Soccer League	Denmark	4–3 (a.e.t.)	Germany	Chișinău, Moldova
13:30	Tobias Pilgaard; Carl Oscar Wegeberg; Axel Damm			Referee: Laurynas Arzuolaitis

30 July 2026 2026 Euro Beach Soccer League	Denmark	6–2	Estonia	Chișinău, Moldova
13:30	Gustav Madsen; Carl Oscar Wegeberg; Ole Hansen; Felix Schmidt			Referee: Sérgio Gomes Soares

31 July 2026 2026 Euro Beach Soccer League	Ukraine	3–5	Denmark	Chișinău, Moldova
18:45			Axel Damm; Villads De Fries; Lukas Frandsen	Referee: Özcan Sultanoğlu

1 August 2026 2026 Euro Beach Soccer League	Denmark	4–0	Moldova	Chișinău, Moldova
20:00	Carl Oscar Wegeberg; Tobias Pilgaard; Gustav Madsen			Referee: Laurynas Arzuolaitis

2 August 2026 2026 Euro Beach Soccer League	Italy	4–3 (a.e.t.)	Denmark	Chișinău, Moldova
20:00			Tobias Pilgaard; Carl Oscar Wegeberg; Lukas Frandsen	Referee: Vladimir Tashkov

8 September 2026 2026 Euro Beach Soccer League	Denmark	2–2 (2–4 a.p)	Germany	Viareggio, Italy
14:00	Bertram Jensen; Villads De Fries			Referee: Mehdi Sayoud

9 September 2026 2026 Euro Beach Soccer League	Denmark	8–4	Moldova	Viareggio, Italy
15:30	Bertram Jensen; Gustav Madsen; Ole Hansen; Axel Damm; Carl Oscar Wegeberg; Oliver Levin; Villads De Fries			Referee: Angelika Gębka

11 September 2026 2026 Euro Beach Soccer League, Superfinal group stage	Italy	7–2	Denmark	Viareggio, Italy
			Bertram Jensen; Lukas Frandsen

12 September 2026 2026 Euro Beach Soccer League, Superfinal semi-final	Spain	8–3	Denmark	Viareggio, Italy
			Tobias Pilgaard; Carl Oscar Wegeberg; Villads De Fries

13 September 2026 2026 Euro Beach Soccer League, Superfinal third-place play-off	Denmark	8–8 (11–12 a.p)	Switzerland	Viareggio, Italy
	Villads De Fries; Bertram Jensen; Carl Oscar Wegeberg
