= 2025 FIFA Beach Soccer World Cup qualification (UEFA) =

2024 FIFA Beach Soccer World Cup qualification (UEFA)
FIFA Beach Soccer World Cup Qualifier - European Qualifier - Andalucía Cádiz 2024

Tournament details
- Host country: Spain
- City: Cádiz
- Dates: 4–13 October
- Teams: 24 (from 1 confederation)
- Venue: 1 (in 1 host city)

The 2025 FIFA Beach Soccer World Cup qualifiers for UEFA was a beach soccer tournament contested by European men's national teams who are members of UEFA that determines the four nations from Europe that qualify to the 2025 FIFA Beach Soccer World Cup in Seychelles.

The event, organised by Beach Soccer Worldwide (BSWW), takes place in Cádiz, Spain from 4–13 October 2024.

The tournament is a multi-stage competition, consisting of a first group stage, single knockout round, second group stage, and placement matches.

== Teams ==
24 teams initially entered the competition, 23 named sides plus one undisclosed team.

The participating teams are listed below, ordered by their European ranking (shown in parentheses) at the time of the draw, out of 31 nations.

- Italy (1)
- Portugal (2)
- Spain (3)
- Belarus (4)
- Switzerland (5)
- Ukraine (6)
- Germany (7)
- France (8)
- Moldova (9)
- Azerbaijan (10)
- Poland (11)
- Czech Republic (12)
- Turkey (14)
- Estonia (15)
- Denmark (16)
- Lithuania (17)
- Norway (18)
- England (19)
- Romania (20)
- Malta (21)
- Georgia (22)
- Kazakhstan (27)
- Belgium (28)

== Draw ==
The draw to split the 24 teams into six groups of four took place at 11:00 CEST (UTC+2) on 16 September in Alghero, Italy. One participating team was undisclosed at the time of the draw and was placed in position four of Group F. However, this slot was ultimately not filled by any team.

== First group stage ==
Each team earns three points for a win in regulation time, two points for a win in extra time, one point for a win in a penalty shoot-out, and no points for a defeat.

All times are local, CEST (UTC+2). Kickoff times shown are those scheduled; actual times may differ slightly.

=== Group A ===
| Pos | Team | Pld | W | W+ | WP | L | GF | GA | GD | Pts | Qualification |
|---|---|---|---|---|---|---|---|---|---|---|---|
| 1 | Spain (H) | 3 | 3 | 0 | 0 | 0 | 29 | 4 | +25 | 9 | Advance to Round of 16 |
| 2 | Azerbaijan | 3 | 2 | 0 | 0 | 1 | 11 | 9 | +2 | 6 | Advance to Round of 16 |
| 3 | England | 3 | 0 | 1 | 0 | 2 | 6 | 15 | −9 | 2 | Advance to Round of 16 |
| 4 | Georgia | 3 | 0 | 0 | 0 | 3 | 5 | 23 | −18 | 0 | |

Source: BSWW
(H) Host
4 October 2024
14:00

| Azerbaijan | 4–0 | England |
|---|---|---|
| Sabir 5', 28'; Orkhan 9'; Amid 30' | Report |

Referee: Mehdi Sayoud (Belgium)
4 October 2024
18:00

| Georgia | 1–13 | Spain |
|---|---|---|
| Jalagania 5' | Report | Chiky 1', 5', 17', 33', 34'; Ramy 2'; Kuman 3', 8', 9', 17'; Suli Batis 3', 27'; D. Ardil 15' |

Referee: Sergio Gomes (Portugal)

5 October 2024
12:45

| Azerbaijan | 7–2 | Georgia |
|---|---|---|
| Sabir 5'; Elshad 14', 29'; Ramil 31'; Amid 31'; Kamran 34'; Bayram 35' | Report | Shamiladze 5', 35' |

Referee: Vitalij Gomolko (Lithuania)
5 October 2024
18:00

| Spain | 9–3 | England |
|---|---|---|
| Ramy 2'; J. Arias 4'; Suli Batis 11', 15'; Juanmi 12'; J. Oliver 13'; Joselito 24'; Domingo 28'; Pedro 32' | Report | Friery 25'; Grossett 36'; Day 36' |

Referee: Vladimir Tashkov (Bulgaria)

7 October 2024
10:15

| England | 3–2 (a.e.t.) | Georgia |
|---|---|---|
| Clarke 8', 11'; Lawson 38' (e.t.) | Report | Jalagania 2'; Lomidze 22' |

Referee: Sergio Gomes (Portugal)
7 October 2024
18:00

| Spain | 7–0 | Azerbaijan |
|---|---|---|
| Chiky 1', 6'; Suli Batis 5'; D. Ardil 18', 35'; J. Oliver 18'; Joselito 19' | Report |

Referee: Aurélien Planchais-Godefroy (Tahiti)

=== Group B ===
| Pos | Team | Pld | W | W+ | WP | L | GF | GA | GD | Pts | Qualification |
|---|---|---|---|---|---|---|---|---|---|---|---|
| 1 | Italy | 2 | 2 | 0 | 0 | 0 | 19 | 5 | +14 | 6 | Advance to Round of 16 |
| 2 | Denmark | 3 | 2 | 0 | 0 | 1 | 19 | 9 | +10 | 6 | Advance to Round of 16 |
| 3 | Czech Republic | 3 | 0 | 0 | 0 | 3 | 5 | 29 | −24 | 0 | |
| 4 | Romania (Note: Romania withdrew after the draw but before the start of the tournament. Numerous players called-up to the Romanian squad could not attend due to prior commitments, leading to the team's withdrawal.) | 0 | 0 | 0 | 0 | 0 | 0 | 0 | 0 | 0 | Withdrew |

Source: BSWW
Notes:
4 October 2024
12:45

| Czech Republic | 0–6 | Denmark |
|---|---|---|
| | Report | Madsen 6', 17'; Stubgaard 13', 22'; Schmidt 28'; Lucht 34' |

Referee: Vladimir Tashkov (Bulgaria)

5 October 2024
16:45

| Italy | 6–3 | Denmark |
|---|---|---|
| Casapieri 7'; Bertacca 11'; Giordani 14', 14'; Damm 33' (o.g.); Sciacca 36' | Report | Madsen 27'; Frandsen 30'; Lucht 31' |

Referee: Aurélien Planchais-Godefroy (Tahiti)

7 October 2024
16:45

| Italy | 13–2 | Czech Republic |
|---|---|---|
| D'Agostino 5'; Bertacca 6'; Giordani 8'; Sciacca 11'; Andriani 16', 26'; Fazzini 20'; Josep Jr. 22'; Fazzini 29', 34'; Alla 30', 36'; Barsotti 31' | Report | Folejtar 20'; Ruda 27' |

Referee: Łukasz Ostrowski (Poland)

Play-off for second place
8 October 2024
12:45

| Denmark | 10–3 | Czech Republic |
|---|---|---|
| Frandsen 8'; Damm 8', 29', 30', 34'; Stubgaard 8'; Dorph 11', 34'; Lucht 20'; Brizze 35' | Report | Slegr 2'; Ruda 20'; Radosta 36' |

Referee: Sergio Gomes (Portugal)

=== Group C ===
| Pos | Team | Pld | W | W+ | WP | L | GF | GA | GD | Pts | Qualification |
|---|---|---|---|---|---|---|---|---|---|---|---|
| 1 | Portugal | 3 | 3 | 0 | 0 | 0 | 24 | 5 | +19 | 9 | Advance to Round of 16 |
| 2 | Estonia | 3 | 2 | 0 | 0 | 1 | 14 | 7 | +7 | 6 | Advance to Round of 16 |
| 3 | Germany | 3 | 1 | 0 | 0 | 2 | 14 | 18 | −4 | 3 | Advance to Round of 16 |
| 4 | Kazakhstan | 3 | 0 | 0 | 0 | 3 | 6 | 28 | −22 | 0 | |

Source: BSWW
4 October 2024
11:30

| Germany | 2–5 | Estonia |
|---|---|---|
| Olli 23', 31' | Report | Lilleorg 8'; Nõmmiko 15'; Kigaste 17'; Thomson 23'; Alaväli 36' |

Referee: Alejandro Ojaos (Spain)
4 October 2024
16:45

| Kazakhstan | 0–12 | Portugal |
|---|---|---|
| | Report | A. Lourenço 7'; Léo Martins 7', 34'; Bê Martins 9'; M. Pintado 17', 35'; P. Mano 20'; Jordan 27'; B. Lopes 28', 31', 36'; R. Pinhal 32' |

Referee: Saverio Bottalico (Italy)

6 October 2024
11:30

| Germany | 9–6 | Kazakhstan |
|---|---|---|
| Peterson 10', 13'; Olli 12'; Baaske 20'; Sand 23'; Hoeveler 24'; Poburski 25'; Niebel 30'; Kaufmann 30' | Report | Ashimov 12', 26'; Chornyy 20'; Demeshko 29'; Gulyy 30'; Arsamakov 31' |

Referee: Matthieu Dor (France)
6 October 2024
18:00

| Portugal | 5–2 | Estonia |
|---|---|---|
| Léo Martins 8', 10', 25', 35'; R. Brilhante 5' | Report | Marmor 28'; Raku 32' |

Referee: Vitalij Gomolko (Lithuania)

7 October 2024
11:30

| Estonia | 7–0 | Kazakhstan |
|---|---|---|
| Thomson 8'; Munskind 12', 16'; Marmor 19'; Alaväli 25'; Nõmmiko 28'; Kotter 31' | Report |

Referee: Vladimir Tashkov (Bulgaria)
7 October 2024
15:30

| Portugal | 7–3 | Germany |
|---|---|---|
| Jordan 2', 21', 22'; Léo Martins 10'; M. Pintado 12', 30'; D. Algarvio 17' | Report | Peterson 21'; Schulte 25'; Jordan 34' (o.g.) |

Referee: Csaba Baghy (Hungary)

=== Group D ===
| Pos | Team | Pld | W | W+ | WP | L | GF | GA | GD | Pts | Qualification |
|---|---|---|---|---|---|---|---|---|---|---|---|
| 1 | Belarus | 2 | 2 | 0 | 0 | 0 | 19 | 5 | +14 | 6 | Advance to Round of 16 |
| 2 | Moldova | 3 | 2 | 0 | 0 | 1 | 15 | 14 | +1 | 6 | Advance to Round of 16 |
| 3 | Belgium | 3 | 0 | 0 | 0 | 3 | 7 | 22 | −15 | 0 | Advance to Round of 16 |
| 4 | Turkey (Note: Turkey withdrew after the draw but before the start of the tournament. Financial constraints were reported as the reason for their withdrawal.) | 0 | 0 | 0 | 0 | 0 | 0 | 0 | 0 | 0 | Withdrew |

Source: BSWW
Notes:
4 October 2024
15:30

| Belarus | 11–1 | Belgium |
|---|---|---|
| Hardzetski 2', 34'; Bokach 5'; Hapon 11', 14', 21'; Drozd 18'; Chaikouski 22'; Piatrouski 24'; Bryshtel 29', 36' | Report | Tilly 14' |

Referee: Wilson Castanheira (Portugal)

6 October 2024
15:30

| Moldova | 6–4 | Belgium |
|---|---|---|
| Graur 7'; Cojocari 9', 25'; Ceh 16'; Ignat 23'; Turta 32' | Report | Ennya 2', 25'; Tilly 14'; Depotbecker 33' |

Referee: Francisco De Oses Bumedien (Spain)

7 October 2024
14:00

| Belarus | 8–4 | Moldova |
|---|---|---|
| Bryshtel 6', 17', 28'; Ryabko 23', 34'; Bokach 25', 36'; Piatrouski 36' | Report | Turta 8', 18'; Ignat 28'; Sîrghi 32' |

Referee: Alejandro Ojaos (Spain)

Play-off for second place
8 October 2024
16:45

| Moldova | 5–2 | Belgium |
|---|---|---|
| Ignat 8'; Turta 30'; Florea 36', 36', 36' | Report | Depotbecker 6'; Hanon 36' |

Referee: Saverio Bottalico (Italy)

=== Group E ===
| Pos | Team | Pld | W | W+ | WP | L | GF | GA | GD | Pts | Qualification |
|---|---|---|---|---|---|---|---|---|---|---|---|
| 1 | Switzerland | 3 | 3 | 0 | 0 | 0 | 29 | 9 | +20 | 9 | Advance to Round of 16 |
| 2 | France | 3 | 2 | 0 | 0 | 1 | 20 | 12 | +8 | 6 | Advance to Round of 16 |
| 3 | Lithuania | 3 | 1 | 0 | 0 | 2 | 10 | 12 | −2 | 3 | Advance to Round of 16 |
| 4 | Malta | 3 | 0 | 0 | 0 | 3 | 2 | 28 | −26 | 0 | |

Source: BSWW
5 October 2024
11:30

| France | 2–1 | Lithuania |
|---|---|---|
| Gosselin 8'; Basquaise 16' | Report | Kliukoit 29' |

Referee: Łukasz Ostrowski (Poland)
5 October 2024
15:30

| Malta | 0–10 | Switzerland |
|---|---|---|
| | Report | Steinemann 3'; Borer 10', 23', 27'; Stankovic 14', 19', 26'; Gmür 20'; J. Knöpfli 34'; Hodel 35' |

Referee: Moreno Longo (Italy)

6 October 2024
12:45

| France | 13–2 | Malta |
|---|---|---|
| Micallef 5' (o.g.); Laassami 12', 35'; Constant 14'; Varrel 15', 27', 30'; Artuphel 17', 20'; Vernhet 21', 33'; Guerin 24'; Maison 28' | Report | M. Agius 23'; Venuto 31' |

Referee: José Pardeiro (Spain)
6 October 2024
16:45

| Switzerland | 10–4 | Lithuania |
|---|---|---|
| Hodel 3', 35'; Borer 9', 10', 16', 36'; J. Knöpfli 14'; Spacca 20'; Novičkov 33' (o.g.); Stankovic 36' | Report | Misev 19' (o.g.); Plytnikas 16', 26'; Lebedevas 17' |

Referee: Saverio Bottalico (Italy)

8 October 2024
14:00

| Lithuania | 5–0 | Malta |
|---|---|---|
| Plytnikas 5', 12'; Novičkov 23'; Borščevskis 29'; Lebedevas 32' | Report |

Referee: Alejandro Ojaos (Spain)
8 October 2024
15:30

| Switzerland | 9–5 | France |
|---|---|---|
| Stankovic 7', 11', 27'; Borer 10', 27'; Eliott 17'; Hodel 19', 23', 34' | Report | Laassami 4', 25', 32'; Basquaise 33', 33' |

Referee: Łukasz Ostrowski (Poland)

=== Group F ===
| Pos | Team | Pld | W | W+ | WP | L | GF | GA | GD | Pts | Qualification |
|---|---|---|---|---|---|---|---|---|---|---|---|
| 1 | Poland | 2 | 2 | 0 | 0 | 0 | 14 | 2 | +12 | 6 | Advance to Round of 16 |
| 2 | Ukraine | 3 | 2 | 0 | 0 | 1 | 15 | 12 | +3 | 6 | Advance to Round of 16 |
| 3 | Norway | 3 | 0 | 0 | 0 | 3 | 5 | 20 | −15 | 0 | |

Source: BSWW
5 October 2024
14:00

| Ukraine | 8–2 | Norway |
|---|---|---|
| Pashko 1'; Sirenko 4'; Levchenko I. 5', 10'; Glutskyi 9'; Zborovskyi 10', 20'; Nerush 29' | Report | Gaare 10'; Lie 22' |

Referee: Sergio Moreno (Switzerland)

6 October 2024
14:00

| Poland | 6–1 | Norway |
|---|---|---|
| Kłopeć 2'; Pietrasiak 3'; Gajda 9'; Jesionowski 10'; Bistuła 12'; Błaszczyk 12' | Report | Haaland 24' |

Referee: Eduards Borisevics (Latvia)

7 October 2024
12:45

| Ukraine | 1–8 | Poland |
|---|---|---|
| Zborovskyi 25' | Report | Karolak 5'; Jesionowski 6'; Brochocki 11', 15', 35'; Kłopeć 12'; Bistuła 23'; Błaszczyk 28' |

Referee: Francisco De Oses Bumedien (Spain)

Play-off for second place
8 October 2024
18:00

| Ukraine | 6–2 | Norway |
|---|---|---|
| Glutskyi 3', 14'; Lystopad 17'; Pashko 26'; Levchenko I. 28'; Borsuk A. 29' | Report | Risanger 21'; Paulos 21' |

Referee: Matthieu Dor (France)

=== Ranking of third-placed teams ===
| Pos | Grp | Team | Pld | W | W+ | WP | L | GF | GA | GD | Pts | Qualification |
|---|---|---|---|---|---|---|---|---|---|---|---|---|
| 1 | E | Lithuania | 3 | 1 | 0 | 0 | 2 | 10 | 12 | −2 | 3 | Advance to Round of 16 |
| 2 | C | Germany | 3 | 1 | 0 | 0 | 2 | 14 | 18 | −4 | 3 | Advance to Round of 16 |
| 3 | A | England | 3 | 0 | 1 | 0 | 2 | 6 | 15 | −9 | 2 | Advance to Round of 16 |
| 4 | D | Belgium | 3 | 0 | 0 | 0 | 3 | 7 | 22 | −15 | 0 | Advance to Round of 16 |
| 5 | F | Norway | 3 | 0 | 0 | 0 | 3 | 5 | 20 | −15 | 0 | |
| 6 | B | Czech Republic | 3 | 0 | 0 | 0 | 3 | 5 | 29 | −24 | 0 | |

Source: BSWW

== Round of 16 ==
Per the results of the first group stage, all group winners and runners-up, plus the four best third placed teams, advance to the Round of 16.

The ties are contested as single elimination matches. The eight winners progress to the second group stage.

Key:
| Winners advance to second group stage | Group 1 |
| Winners advance to second group stage | Group 2 |

9 October 2024
09:00

| Denmark | 4–3 | Moldova |
|---|---|---|
| Dorph 1'; Frandsen 20'; Lucht 21'; Wegeberg 31' | Report | Sîrghi 6'; Cojocari 10', 21' |

Referee: Alejandro Ojaos (Spain)

9 October 2024
10:15

| France | 5–4 (a.e.t.) | Ukraine |
|---|---|---|
| Varrel 11'; Gosselin 21'; Bru 28'; Maison 35'; Basquaise 38' (e.t.) | Report | Lystopad 6'; Levchenko 7'; Pashko 16', 32' |

Referee: Vitalij Gomolko (Lithuania)

9 October 2024
11:30

| Switzerland | 6–3 | Estonia |
|---|---|---|
| Misev 2'; Hodel 12'; Spacca 13', 20'; Borer 15', 24' | Report | Raku 16'; Marmor 29'; Munskind 34' |

Referee: Sergio Gomes (Portugal)

9 October 2024
12:45

| Poland | 3–1 | Germany |
|---|---|---|
| Poźniak 8'; Błaszczyk 18'; Brochocki 19' | Report | Olli 35' |

Referee: Saverio Bottalico (Italy)

9 October 2024
14:15

| Italy | 9–2 | England |
|---|---|---|
| Alla 6'; Fazzini 8'; Andriani 9'; Barsotti 11'; Bertacca 14'; Remedi 15', 35'; Zurlo 20'; Sciacca 23' | Report | Clarke 18'; Grossett 25' |

Referee: Matthieu Dor (France)

9 October 2024
15:30

| Belarus | 3–0 w/o (Note: Lithuania refused to fulfil their fixture against Belarus in protest of the Belarusian involvement in the Russian invasion of Ukraine. For administrative purposes, Belarus were awarded a 3–0 walkover win.) | Lithuania |
|---|---|---|
| | Report |

Referee: Łukasz Ostrowski (Poland)

9 October 2024
16:45

| Portugal | 13–5 | Azerbaijan |
|---|---|---|
| Jordan 6', 14', 24'; B. Lopes 10', 29', 30'; M. Pintado 11', 29'; Léo Martins 13'; Bê Martins 21'; P. Mano 22'; Dias 27'; A. Lourenço 32' | Report | Orkhan 3', 6', 30'; Ramil 14'; Sabir 22' |

Referee: Vladimir Tashkov (Bulgaria)

9 October 2024
18:00

| Spain | 13–2 | Belgium |
|---|---|---|
| Suli Batis 4', 21', 28'; Kuman 8', 14'; Pedro 9'; Chiky 13'; Ridu 22', 36'; J. Oliver 25'; D Ardil 35'; Joselito 36', 36' | Report | La Rocca 19'; Tilly 23' |

Referee: Aurélien Planchais-Godefroy (Tahiti)

== Second group stage ==
The eight winners of the Round of 16 ties advance to the second group stage.

The winners and runners-up of each group qualify for the 2025 FIFA Beach Soccer World Cup.

| Key: | Qualified for – | 2025 World Cup finals |
| Key: | Advance to – | Final / | Third place match / | Fifth place match / | Seventh place match |

=== Group 1 ===
| Pos | Team | Pld | W | W+ | WP | L | GF | GA | GD | Pts |
|---|---|---|---|---|---|---|---|---|---|---|
| 1 | Italy | 3 | 2 | 0 | 0 | 1 | 23 | 6 | +17 | 6 |
| 2 | Belarus | 3 | 2 | 0 | 0 | 1 | 18 | 13 | +5 | 6 |
| 3 | Switzerland | 3 | 1 | 0 | 0 | 2 | 7 | 23 | −16 | 3 |
| 4 | Denmark | 3 | 0 | 1 | 0 | 2 | 6 | 12 | −6 | 2 |

Source: BSWW
10 October 2024
14:15

| Switzerland | 3–9 | Belarus |
|---|---|---|
| Steinemann 1', 35'; Hodel 4' | Report | Avgustov 3', 11'; Bokach 4'; Hardzetski 11'; Bryshtel 22'; Piatrouski 27'; Novikau 27'; Kanstantsinau 30'; Hapon 35' |

Referee: Vladimir Tashkov (Bulgaria)
10 October 2024
15:30

| Denmark | 3–2 (a.e.t.) | Italy |
|---|---|---|
| Bertacca 11' (o.g.); Damm 28'; Dorph 38' (e.t.) | Report | Remedi 9'; Bertacca 12' |

Referee: Eduards Borisevics (Latvia)

11 October 2024
14:15

| Belarus | 3–9 | Italy |
|---|---|---|
| Hapon 13'; Chaikouski 32'; Novikau 32' | Report | Fazzini 3'; D'Agostino 8', 14'; Bertacca 10'; Bryshtel 20' (o.g.); Josep Jr. 20'; Remedi 28'; Zurlo 34', 34' |

Referee: Sergio Gomes (Portugal)
11 October 2024
15:30

| Denmark | 2–4 | Switzerland |
|---|---|---|
| Damm 20'; Stubgaard 22' | Report | Spacca 10', 26'; Eliott 31'; Hodel 32' |

Referee: Matthieu Dor (France)

12 October 2024
16:45

| Belarus | 6–1 | Denmark |
|---|---|---|
| Novikau 9'; Frandsen 14' (o.g.); Hapon 25'; Hardzetski 26'; Avgustov 27'; Ryabko 34' | Report | Madsen 21' |

Referee: Vladimir Tashkov (Bulgaria)
12 October 2024
18:00

| Italy | 12–0 | Switzerland |
|---|---|---|
| Sciacca 4'; D'Agostino 10', 22'; Josep Jr. 13', 20'; Giordani 16'; Alla 18'; Bertacca 21', 33'; Remedi 22'; Andriani 34', 36' | Report |

Referee: Łukasz Ostrowski (Poland)

=== Group 2 ===
| Pos | Team | Pld | W | W+ | WP | L | GF | GA | GD | Pts |
|---|---|---|---|---|---|---|---|---|---|---|
| 1 | Portugal | 3 | 3 | 0 | 0 | 0 | 21 | 10 | +11 | 9 |
| 2 | Spain | 3 | 1 | 0 | 1 | 1 | 14 | 15 | −1 | 4 |
| 3 | Poland | 3 | 1 | 0 | 0 | 2 | 11 | 12 | −1 | 3 |
| 4 | France | 3 | 0 | 0 | 0 | 3 | 7 | 16 | −9 | 0 |

Source: BSWW
10 October 2024
16:45

| Portugal | 6–1 | Poland |
|---|---|---|
| Jordan 2', 26'; M. Pintado 17'; Coimbra 20'; R. Brilhante 23'; Witkowski 33' (o.g.) | Report | Brochocki 34' |

Referee: Vitalij Gomolko (Lithuania)
10 October 2024
18:00

| France | 3–3 (a.e.t.) | Spain |
|---|---|---|
| Gosselin 2', 35'; Basquaise 2' | Report | D. Ardil 11'; Chiky 24', 31' |
Penalties
| Bru (penalty scored); Laassami (penalty missed); Constant (penalty missed); Varrel (penalty missed) | 1–3 | (penalty scored) Chiky; (penalty missed) Pedro; (penalty scored) Suli Batis; (penalty scored) Domingo |

Referee: Saverio Bottalico (Italy)

11 October 2024
16:45

| Portugal | 6–3 | France |
|---|---|---|
| M. Pintado 6'; Jordan 8'; B. Lopes 12'; Guerin 11' (o.g.), 16' (o.g.); Bê Martins 13' | Report | Laassami 5', 6'; Gosselin 24' |

Referee: Eduards Borisevics (Latvia)
11 October 2024
18:00

| Spain | 5–3 | Poland |
|---|---|---|
| Pietrasiak 7' (o.g.); Suli Batis 16'; Chiky 26', 28'; Kuman 26' | Report | Błaszczyk 4'; Brochocki 19', 19' |

Referee: Vitalij Gomolko (Lithuania)

13 October 2024 (Note: Due to inclement weather conditions on 12 October, some of the second group stage matches had to be postponed until 13 October. This forced the cancellation of all placement matches, also scheduled for 13 October. The tournament champions were therefore decided by the team with the most points at the conclusion of the second group stage instead.)
16:45

| Poland | 7–1 | France |
|---|---|---|
| Kłopeć 1'; Bistuła 10'; Błaszczyk 14', 25'; Brochocki 16', 23'; Pietrasiak 18' | Report | Laassami 34' |

Referee: Csaba Baghy (Hungary)
13 October 2024
18:00

| Spain | 6–9 | Portugal |
|---|---|---|
| Suli Batis 6', 31'; Kuman 15', 36'; Domingo 21'; Juanmi 24' | Report | Léo Martins 3', 9', 13'; P. Mano 18', 30'; M. Pintado 20', 25'; B. Lopes 32'; A. Lourenço 35' |

Referee: Aurélien Planchais-Godefroy (Tahiti)

== Placement matches ==
Per the results of the second group stage, the teams finishing in corresponding positions in the two groups play against each other to determine final placements.

=== Seventh place match ===
13 October 2024

| Fourth place Group 1 | Cancelled | Fourth place Group 2 |

=== Fifth place match ===
13 October 2024

| Third place Group 1 | Cancelled | Third place Group 2 |

=== Third place match ===
13 October 2024

| Runners-up Group 1 | Cancelled | Runners-up Group 2 |

=== Final ===
13 October 2024
18:00

| Winners Group 1 | Cancelled | Winners Group 2 |

== Final standings ==
=== Qualified teams to the FIFA Beach Soccer World Cup ===
The following four teams from UEFA qualify for the 2025 FIFA Beach Soccer World Cup.

| Team | Qualified on | Previous appearances in FIFA Beach Soccer World Cup^{1} only FIFA era (since 2005) |
|---|---|---|
| Portugal | 11 October 2024 | 11 (2005, 2006, 2007, 2008, 2009, 2011, **2015**, 2017, **2019**, 2021, 2024) |
| Spain | 11 October 2024 | 9 (2005, 2006, 2007, 2008, 2009, 2013, 2015, 2021, 2024) |
| Belarus | 12 October 2024 | 3 (2019, 2021, 2024) |
| Italy | 12 October 2024 | 9 (2006, 2007, 2008, 2009, 2011, 2015, 2017, 2019, 2024) |

^{1} Bold indicates champions for that year. Italic indicates hosts for that year.
