= Ryparken =

Area of Copenhagen, Denmark

Coordinates: 55°43′10″N 12°33′35″E

Hans Knudsen Plads near Ryparken railway station

Ryparken is an area in the northern part of Østerbro, Copenhagen. Close to the ethnic and diverse neighborhood of Nørrebro, yet still in the 2100 Østerbro zip code, Ryparken defies easy definition. The area is well connected both by buses and by the Ryparken S-train station, formerly known as Lyngbyvej station until 1972.

== See also ==
- Ryparken railway station
