= Tirrenia =

- Frazione
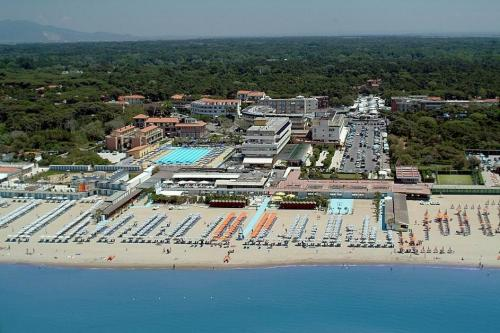
- View of Tirrenia beach

- Location of Tirrenia in Italy
- Coordinates: 43°37′38″N 10°17′28″E
- Country: Italy
- Region: Tuscany
- Province: Pisa (PI)
- Comune: Pisa
- Elevation: 5 m (16 ft)

Population
  - Total: 3,150
- Time zone: UTC+1 (CET)
  - Summer (DST): UTC+2 (CEST)
- Postal code: 56128
- Dialing code: (+39) 050

Tirrenia is a frazione (parish) of Pisa, Tuscany, Italy with a population of 3,112 inhabitants. Immersed in the pine forest of the "Litorale Pisano" and in the coast of Ligurian Sea (even if the name of the village refers to Tyrrhenian Sea, in Italian Mar Tirreno), Tirrenia is in the northern side of the coast of Tuscany and next to the Parco Naturale Migliarino, San Rossore, Massaciuccoli, between Pisa and Livorno.

In between Marina di Pisa and Calambrone, Tirrenia is a destination for Italian and, more generally, European seaside tourism.

== History ==
The village was founded during the fascist regime. Benito Mussolini had this once swamped village transformed into what he called "The Pearl of the Mediterranean Sea." Many architects from all over Italy were called upon to build centres for orphans and houses for the rich. In the 1930s, places for studying film were constructed, and la Pisorno was built to expand the ideal of fascism in Italy and to make propaganda. Today, in the area of Tirrenia near Livorno, the old colonies built by Mussolini for orphans are being restored since they were abandoned after World War II. These colonies will be used as tourist attractions.

In the early 1950s, American troops established the military complex Camp Darby not far from Tirrenia. Subsequently, American families began to rent villas and flats in Tirrenia. In the mid to late-1950s through the early-1990s, many of the inhabitants of Tirrenia were American families. The American Beach in Tirrenia (which closed at the end of the 2014 summer season and became a free beach) was a vacation venue for American and NATO troops stationed throughout Europe. At least during the 1980s, (or possibly earlier) and at least as late as 1990 lifeguards were US Soldiers from units in Vicenza and Camp Darby. The lifeguards from the American Beach also provided lifeguard services to both adjoining Italian free beaches. For many years, retired American personnel who had remained in Italy due to having married Italian women, provided night security. Fourth of July celebrations were often held on the beach, as it was fairly easy to set up pyrotechnical displays without fear of causing fires. They were anchored in the sand and fired out over the water. The American Beach played a minor role during Operation Desert Shield. A goodly number of troops heading into the Desert, were provided R&R at Camp Darby. The Beach normally closed on Labor Day, that year it remained open through September to provide troops a place to be.

Tirrenia is generally considered the southern end of the Riviera which starts off the southern coast of France and follows the shore as it curves to the south. Some do extend the Italian Riviera to just past Livorno (Leghorn) just a few miles further.

In Calambrone, just south of Tirrenia, the U.S. Army Hospital served the Americans that lived in Tirrenia. The hospital closed in the 1980s and transferred to Camp Darby, becoming a clinic.

== Main sights ==
=== Theme parks ===
- Sunlight ParkPark
- Fantasilandia
- Luna Park
- Parco Giochi Mattera Gian Carlo

Tirrenia is also home to Camp Darby Army Base, a home to the Southern European Task Force (SETAF).

The village is surrounded by sand hills and lush forests, whose fauna include wild boars.

=== Bathing establishments ===
- Alma
- Calypso
- Corallo
- Cosmopolitan
- Delfino
- dei Carabinieri
- della Finanza
- dei Paracadutisti
- Europa
- Fiorella
- Florida
- Golf
- Hoasy
- Imperiale
- La Perla
- Laura
- Lido
- Lomi
- Luana
- Maddalena
- Maestrale
- Mary
- Meloria
- Miramare
- Mistral
- Nettuno
- La Pace
- Paradiso
- Roma
- Rosa
- Rosalba
- Siria
- Tirrenia
- Venere
- Vittoria
- American Beach (closed in 2014)

== Economy ==
Tirrenia's economy is mainly based on tourism, more domestic than foreign. Also, fishing is a source of profit for citizens of Tirrenia. Tirrenia is also one of the most expensive maritime localities, with rising housing costs.

Tirrenia is especially visited by young people, mostly from Pisa and Livorno, because of the vast quantity of pubs and discos that the village offers. The main avenue provides access to camping grounds, seaside establishments, and high-quality, luxurious hotels.

== Climate ==
Tirrenia has a Mediterranean and moderate climate even throughout the winter, mitigated by the sea.

== Sport ==
With the presence of a training center of the Italian National Olympic Committee (CONI), many athletes go to Tirrenia to practise and at times relax by the seashore. Two golf and country clubs can be found, as well as tennis courts, and public pools for any water sports. Additionally, Tirrenia is home to a baseball academy run by Major League Baseball.

== Notable residents ==
- Camila Giorgi (born 1991), Italian tennis player
