= Belarus national beach soccer team =

Belarus
- Association: Football Federation of Belarus
- Confederation: UEFA (Europe)
- Head coach: (Spain) Nicolas Alvarado Caporale (Nico)
- Captain: Ihar Bryshtel
- Most caps: Vadzim Bokach (105)
- Top scorer: Ihar Bryshtel (121)
- FIFA code: BLR
- BSWW ranking: 4 (2 September 2026)
First colours
Second colours

First international
- Poland 4–1 Belarus (Chodecz, Poland; 7 May 2008)

Biggest win
- Turkey 1–12 Belarus (Batumi, Georgia; 18 July 2025)

Biggest defeat
- Belarus 1–10 Russia (Saint Petersburg, Russia; 30 March 2011)

World Cup
- Appearances: 4 (first in 2019)
- Best result: (silver) 2nd place (2025)

The Belarus national beach soccer team represents Belarus in international beach soccer competitions and is controlled by the Football Federation of Belarus (BFF), the governing body for football in Belarus.

After the Russian invasion of Ukraine, UEFA, the European governing body for football, banned Belarus from hosting international competitions.

== Results and fixtures ==
The following is a list of match results in the last 12 months, as well as any future matches that have been scheduled.

Legend

Win Draw Lose Fixture

== Players ==
=== Current squad ===
The following players and staff members were called up for the 2025 FIFA Beach Soccer World Cup.

Note: Flags indicate national team as defined under FIFA eligibility rules; some limited exceptions apply. Players may hold more than one non-FIFA nationality.

No.	Pos.	Nation	Player
1	GK	BLR	Uladzimir Ustsinovich
2	DF	BLR	Vadzim Bokach
3	DF	BLR	Ivan Kanstantsinau
4	FW	BLR	Artsemi Drozd
5	DF	BLR	Mikita Chaikouski
6	DF	BLR	Yury Piatrouski

No.	Pos.	Nation	Player
7	DF	BLR	Yauheni Novikau
8	FW	BLR	Ihar Bryshtel
9	FW	BLR	Yahor Hardzetski
10	FW	BLR	Anatoliy Ryabko
11	FW	BLR	Aleh Hapon
12	GK	BLR	Mikhail Avgustov

Head coach: (Spain) Nicolás Caporale

== Competitive record ==
=== FIFA Beach Soccer World Cup ===
FIFA World Cup record										Qualification (UEFA) record								
Year	Round	Pos	Pld	W	W+	L	GF	GA	GD	Round	Pos	Pld	W	W+	L	GF	GA	GD
(Brazil) 2005	Did not qualify									No qualification matches								
(Brazil) 2006	Did not qualify									No qualification matches								
(Brazil) 2007	Did not qualify									No qualification matches								
(France) 2008	Did not qualify									Round of 16	–	4	1	0	3	10	14	–4
(United Arab Emirates) 2009	Did not qualify									Group Stage	–	3	1	0	2	7	10	–3
(Italy) 2011	Did not qualify									Group Stage	–	3	0	0	3	10	18	–8
(French Polynesia) 2013	Did not qualify									Playoff Stage	–	7	3	1	3	29	27	+2
(Portugal) 2015	Did not qualify									Final Stage	5th	7	4	1	2	23	16	+7
(The Bahamas) 2017	Did not qualify									Final Stage	11th	8	3	0	5	29	23	+6
(Paraguay) 2019	Group stage	11th	3	1	0	2	10	13	−3	Third place	3rd	8	4	3	1	30	20	+10
(Russia) 2021	Group stage	14th	3	0	1	2	8	17	−9	Fourth place	4th	3	3	0	0	21	7	+14
(United Arab Emirates) 2023	Fourth place	4th	6	3	1	2	21	18	+3	Playoffs	–	4	4	0	0	30	11	+19
(Seychelles) 2025	Runners-up	2nd	6	5	0	1	36	18	+18	Group stage	–	3	2	0	1	18	13	+5
Total	0 Titles	4/13	18	9	2	7	75	66	+9	0 Titles	10/11	50	25	5	20	208	159	+49

== Honours ==
- FIFA Beach Soccer World Cup
  - Runners-up (1): 2025
- FIFA Beach Soccer World Cup qualifying tournament
  - Third place (2): 2019, 2024
- Euro Beach Soccer League
  - Runners-up (1): 2021
  - Third place (3): 2023, 2024, 2025
