= Glenn Hodel =

Swiss beach soccer player

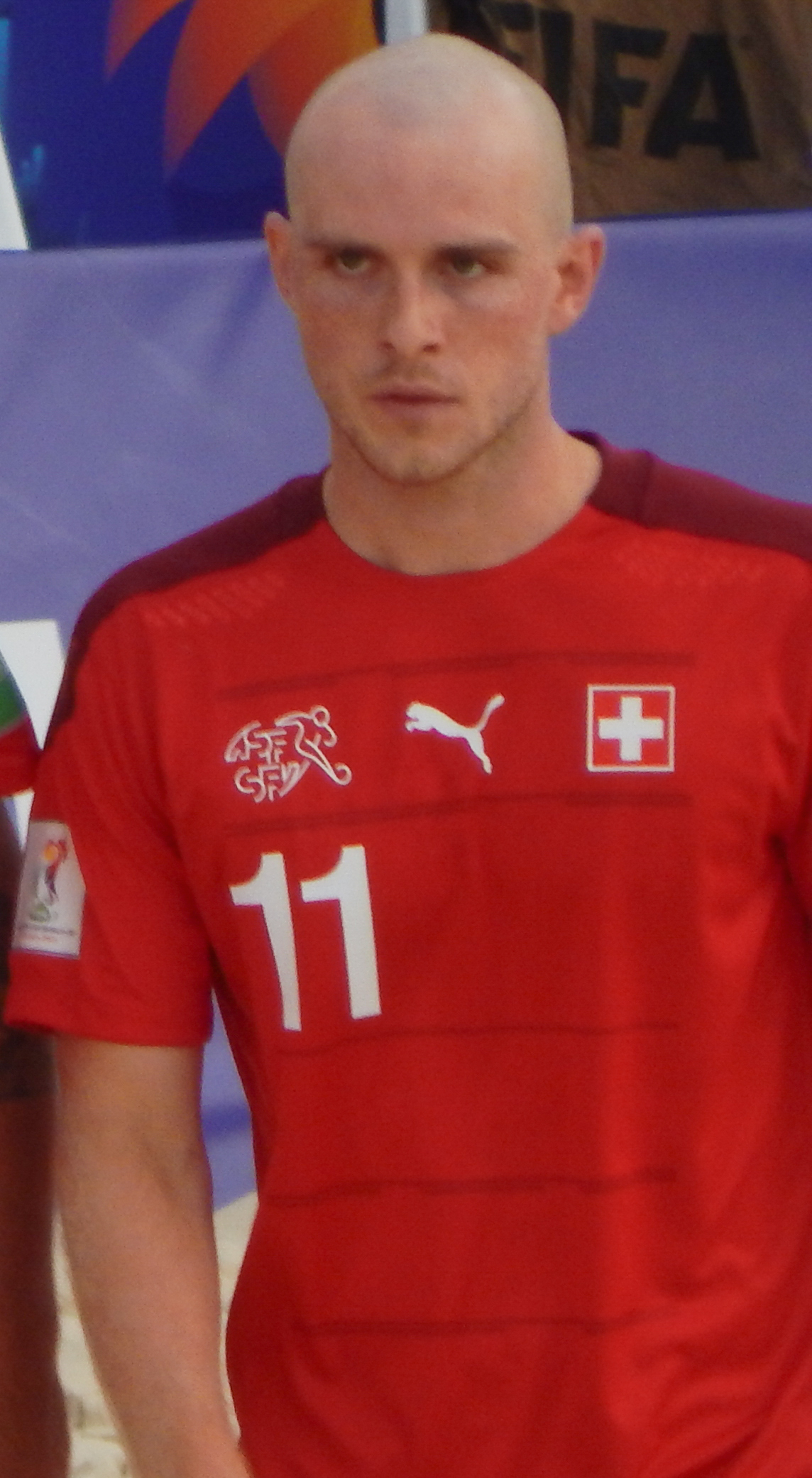
- Hodel at the 2021 World Cup.

Personal information
- Full name: Glenn David Hodel
- Date of birth: 22 November 1996 (age 29)
- Place of birth: Lucerne, Switzerland
- Height: 1.87 m (6 ft 2 in)
- Position: Forward

International career^{‡}
Years	Team	Apps	(Gls)
2013–	Switzerland	150	
- ‡ National team caps and goals as of 1 August 2022

Glenn Hodel (born 22 November 1996) is a Swiss beach soccer player who plays as a forward for the Switzerland national team.

He is the nephew of former Swiss association football international, Marc Hodel.

== Career ==
Hodel is an Aargau native. The similarity of his name to that of former England midfielder, Glenn Hoddle, is not a coincidence – his father, a fan of Tottenham Hotspur, gave his son the first name Glenn in honour of Hoddle.

He originally pursued association football but switched to beach soccer aged 14. He debuted in the Swiss National League aged 15, and subsequently made his debut for Switzerland in 2013 in a friendly versus Poland aged 16. Aged just 18, he was top scorer of the 2015 Swiss League season. That year, he represented the Swiss national team at the FIFA Beach Soccer World Cup for the first time, and has since appeared at three more editions (2017, 2019, 2021). At the latter, he won the Golden Boot (top scorer award) with 12 goals, despite being suspended for one match.

In 2022, he surpassed 150 caps for Switzerland, and his goal in the final versus Portugal helped Switzerland become Euro Beach Soccer League champions. He was then European club champion with Israeli side Kfar Qassem at the 2023 Euro Winners Cup and won the gold medal with Switzerland at the 2023 European Games (albeit he did not feature in the gold medal match itself due to injury).

== Statistics ==
Competition	Year	Apps	Goals	Ref.
FIFA Beach Soccer World Cup
FIFA Beach Soccer World Cup	(Portugal) 2015	2	0	
FIFA Beach Soccer World Cup	(The Bahamas) 2017	4	5	
FIFA Beach Soccer World Cup	(Paraguay) 2019	4	2	
FIFA Beach Soccer World Cup	(Russia) 2021	5	12	
Total		15	19	—

== Honours ==
As of 2023.

The following is a selection, not an exhaustive list, of the major international honours Hodel has achieved:

- FIFA Beach Soccer World Cup
  - Third place (1): 2021
  - Golden Boot (1): 2021
- Euro Beach Soccer League
  - Winner (1): 2022
- European Games
  - Gold medal (1): 2023
  - Bronze medal (1): 2019
- UEFA qualifiers for the FIFA Beach Soccer World Cup
  - Runner-up (1): 2016
- Euro Winners Cup
  - Winner (1): 2023
- Beach Soccer Stars
  - World's best players shortlist (3): 2021, 2022, 2023
