= Ihar Bryshtel =

Belarusian beach soccer player (born 1987)

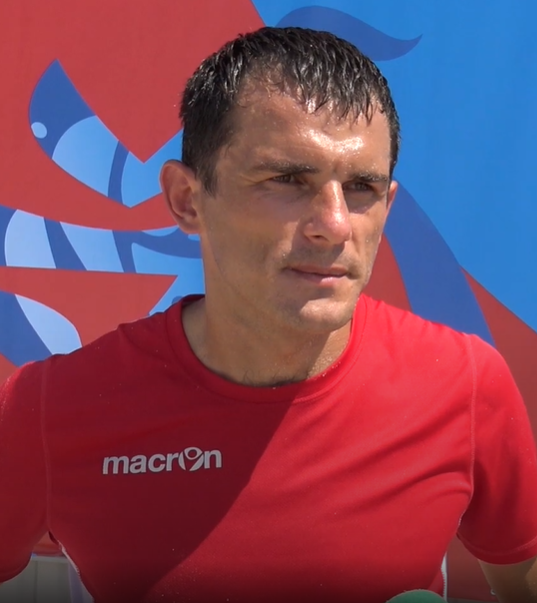
- Bryshtel at the 2019 European Games.

Personal information
- Full name: Ihar Uladzimiravich Bryshtel
- Date of birth: 13 July 1987 (age 39)
- Place of birth: Kobryn District, Brest Region, Belarus SSR, Soviet Union
- Height: 1.83 m (6 ft 0 in)
- Position: Forward

Senior career*
Years	Team	Apps	(Gls)
2006	Kobrin	10	(0)
2013–2014	Kobrin	14	(15)
2014	Belita-Viteks Uzda	6	(3)
Total		30	(18)

International career^{‡}
2009–	Belarus (beach soccer)	>100	(>100)
- * Club domestic league appearances and goals ‡ National team caps and goals as of 3 April 2023

Ihar Uladzimiravich Bryshtel (Belarusian: Ігар Уладзіміравіч Брыштэль; Russian: Игорь Владимирович Бриштель; born 13 July 1987) is a Belarusian beach soccer and occasional association football player who plays as a forward for the Belarus national team.

== Career ==
Bryshtel made his debut for Belarus soon after the national team was formed, against the Netherlands at the third stage of the 2009 Euro Beach Soccer League. Over the next ten years, he collected over 100 caps for Belarus and established a reputation as one of Europe's most prolific strikers, scooping multiple top scorer and best player awards in international competitions; he was also named best Belarusian player of the year seven times during this period.

In July 2017, Bryshtel scored his 100th goal for Belarus against Lithuania at an exhibition tournament. In 2019, he signed for top Russian club Kristall, having played for other Russian clubs since 2011. He was also part of the Belarusian squad the 2019 FIFA Beach Soccer World Cup, Belarus's first appearance at the World Cup, ending the tournament as the team's top goalscorer with four.

In August 2020, Bryshtel was one of many Belarusian athletes to speak out against the Lukashenko regime during the 2020–2021 Belarusian protests. As a matter of politics, this resulted in his banishment from the national team; he was captain at the time of his exclusion, and his time in exile included missing out on Belarus's 2021 FIFA Beach Soccer World Cup campaign. He continued to play club beach soccer in Russia, for Kristall, during this time, racking up over 100 goals and appearances, winning multiple Russian league titles. In February 2023, Bryshtel publicly expressed "repentance" for his actions and was assimilated back into the national team.

Bryshtel's impact on his return was instant, winning the best player award at the World Cup qualifiers in July and being voted as Belarusian player of the year for an eighth time. He was subsequently included in Belarus's 12-man roster for the 2024 World Cup.

== Statistics ==
Note: Some of the sources of these statistics may have counted an appearance when the player was actually an unused substitute.

Competition	Season	Div.	Apps	Goals	Ref.
Euro Beach Soccer League
Euro Beach Soccer League	2009	B	5	3	
Euro Beach Soccer League	2010	B	2	2	
Euro Beach Soccer League	2011	B	5	4	
Euro Beach Soccer League	2012	B	3	1	
Euro Beach Soccer League	2013	A	6	2	
Euro Beach Soccer League	2014	A	9	13	
Euro Beach Soccer League	2015	A	7	11	
Euro Beach Soccer League	2016	A	10	12	
Euro Beach Soccer League	2017	A	10	14	
Euro Beach Soccer League	2018	A	10	12	
Euro Beach Soccer League	2019	A	4	3	
Euro Beach Soccer League	2023	A	6	4	
Total			77	81	—

Competition	Year	Apps	Goals	Ref.
FIFA Beach Soccer World Cup
FIFA Beach Soccer World Cup	(Paraguay) 2019	3	4	
FIFA Beach Soccer World Cup	(United Arab Emirates) 2024	6	12	
Total		9	16	—

== Honours ==
As of 2023.

The following is a selection, not an exhaustive list, of the major honours Bryshtel has achieved:

- Euro Beach Soccer League
  - Superfinal
    - Third place (1): 2023
    - Top scorer (1): 2018
  - Regular season
    - Division B stage winner (2): 2009, 2012
    - Division A stage winner (2): 2016, 2018
    - Top scorer (5): 2014 (x1), 2015 (x1), 2016 (x1), 2017 (x2)
    - Best player (1): 2018 (x1)
- UEFA qualifiers for the FIFA Beach Soccer World Cup
  - Third place (1): 2019
  - Best player (1): 2023
- Euro Winners Cup
  - Third place (2): 2015, 2018
  - Top scorer (1): 2015
- Beach Soccer Stars
  - World's best player shortlist (4): 2017, 2018, 2019, 2023
- ABFF beach soccer player of the year
  - First place (8): 2011, 2012, 2014, 2015, 2016, 2017, 2018, 2023
