= Eliott Mounoud =

Swiss beach soccer player (born 1995)

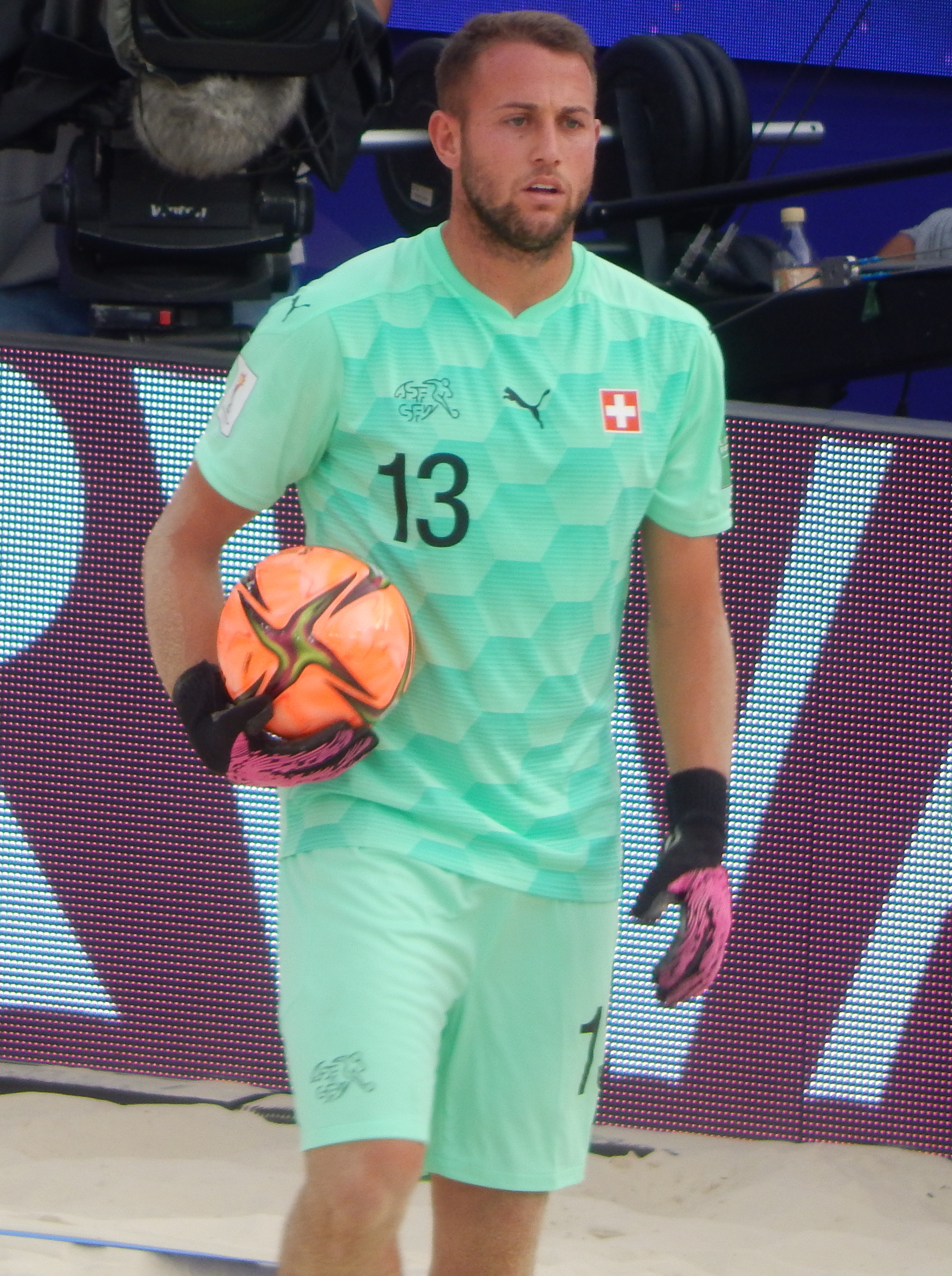
- Mounoud at the 2021 World Cup.

Personal information
- Full name: Eliott Henri Mounoud
- Date of birth: 10 August 1995 (age 31)
- Place of birth: Geneva, Switzerland
- Height: 1.88 m (6 ft 2 in)
- Position: Goalkeeper

International career^{‡}
Years	Team	Apps	(Gls)
2017–	Switzerland		
- ‡ National team caps and goals as of 30 December 2022

Eliott Mounoud (born 10 August 1995) is a Swiss beach soccer player who plays as a goalkeeper for the Swiss national team. Besides Switzerland, he has played in Georgia, Costa Rica, Israel, Ukraine, Poland, Russia, Portugal, and Spain.

== Career ==
Mounoud has lived in Torredembarra, Spain since the age of five and originally wanted to represent the Spanish national team, and so initially rejected calls from Switzerland. However, after failing to be called up by Spain, he eventually accepted the opportunity to represent his birth nation, debuting in 2017 aged 22.

He helped Switzerland reach third place at the 2021 FIFA Beach Soccer World Cup (claiming the Golden Glove) and was awarded the 2021 and 2022 best goalkeeper in the world award at the Beach Soccer Stars ceremony.
