= Neném (beach soccer) =

Brazilian former beach soccer player

Personal information
- Full name: Carlos Alberto Lisboa
- Date of birth: 5 February 1973 (age 53)
- Place of birth: Rio de Janeiro, Brazil
- Height: 1.70 m (5 ft 7 in)
- Position: Forward

Senior career*
Years	Team	Apps	(Gls)
1999	Lille (football)	6	(0)

International career
1994–2008	Brazil	310	(337)

Managerial career
- 2007: Japan
- 2011–2018: Qatar
Medal record
Representing Brazil
Men's Beach soccer
Beach Soccer World Championships
Winner	1995 Rio de Janeiro
Winner	1996 Rio de Janeiro
Winner	1997 Rio de Janeiro
Winner	1998 Rio de Janeiro
Winner	1999 Rio de Janeiro
Winner	2000 Rio de Janeiro
Winner	2002 Vitoria
Winner	2003 Rio de Janeiro
Winner	2004 Rio de Janeiro
FIFA Beach Soccer World Cup
Third place	2005 Rio de Janeiro
- * Club domestic league appearances and goals

Carlos Alberto Lisboa (born 5 February 1973), better known as Neném, is a retired Brazilian beach soccer player who played as a forward. He was a mainstay of the Brazil national team from 1994 until 2005. Injury forced him into retirement in 2009.

He is considered one of the greatest players to ever grace the sport; in 2019, the magazine France Football (who award the Ballon d'Or in association football) placed Neném second in an article named "10 Legends of Beach Soccer". He is also the all-time top scorer of the Brazil national team, with 337 goals. He is the second player with the most Beach Soccer World Championship titles with 9, only behind fellow Brazilian defender Júnior Negão.

== Career ==
=== Playing career ===
In 1994, aged 21 and trying to make a career as an association football forward, Neném accepted an invite from Júnior and Edinho to join them and other veteran players as part of the newly formed Brazil national beach soccer team. He debuted at the Copa America tournament in December. Having impressed, he was then chosen ahead of fellow protégé Jorginho for the Brazil squad at the first edition of the Beach Soccer World Championships in 1995 a month later.

Subsequently, Neném continued to play for Brazil, reaching 100 goals for his country in a 10–2 victory against Spain at the 1998 World Championships. Meanwhile, he also maintained his dream of having a successful football career. He had spells at Fluminense, Marcílio Dias, Figueirense, Cruzeiro and CFZ do Rio. But most notably, aged 25, Neném signed for French club Lille OSC in January 1999, stepping aside from Brazil's beach soccer squad. After only a handful of appearances in Ligue 2 and the Coupe de France and without scoring in any, Neném failed to fit into the team's system and quickly returned to Brazil in the summer. Soon after, Neném decided to end his footballing pursuits and instead dedicate himself entirely to beach soccer.

His career highlight came in 2002, when, aged 28, he was crowned the de facto best beach soccer player in the world by claiming the MVP award at the 2002 World Championships, whilst also jointly scooping the top scorer award; he was subsequently the outright top scorer of the 2003 tournament. When the World Championships were abolished after the final edition in 2004, Neném had accumulated the second most goals scored of any player in the competition, with 55.

In 2005, Brazil finished in a disappointing third place in the inaugural edition of the FIFA Beach Soccer World Cup. However, Neném performed well during the tournament, claiming two individual awards – the Silver Ball (second best player) and Silver Shoe (second top scorer) commendations.

=== Exclusion from the Brazil squad ===
Brazil's failure at the 2005 World Cup lead to suggestions that the bulk of the squad was now too old, with Neném aged 33 heading into the next World Cup. Alexandre Soares became Brazil's new manager in the summer of 2005 and ushered in radical changes to the squad, shunning longstanding squad members such as Jorginho, Robertinho, Juninho and Neném himself. This was in spite of Neném's reputation of being Brazil's all-time top goalscorer which had earned him the nickname, "rei da praia" (king of the beach). Subsequently, Neném et al. were controversially not included in the squad for the 2006 World Cup. Soares justified his decisions in claiming that team cohesion was more important than individual brilliance; others, including Neném, cited off-field political strife involving relations between the players and the then governing body for the sport in Brazil. His exclusion was met with fury by fans during Brazil's opening game of the tournament against Poland, who chanted "where's Neném, where's Neném!?", something which was repeated throughout Brazil's campaign. Some fans also hurled abuse at Soares on the touchline. However, Soares' choices in dropping such senior players were ultimately vindicated, as Brazil went on to win that year's World Cup.

The likes of Jorginho were particularly angry, dumbfounded and outspoken regarding Soares' decision to exclude them; Neném also criticised Soares, however told media after the semi-finals, "Too bad I wasn't there [part of the squad], but I'm happy, I'm Brazilian above all... I am happy for my teammates and the coach. He [Soares] has his way of working, and I respect that." Nevertheless, he also expressed his desire to regain his place in the national team.

=== Retirement and management ===
In 2007, Neném entered international management after accepting an offer to coach Japan at that year's Mundialito tournament which included a 4–0 loss against his native Brazil, an experience he described as "difficult" and "weird"; he was given a contract until the end of the year. During this time he also oversaw the team at the 2007 World Cup. Meanwhile, he continued to play club beach soccer, including in Japan, but failed to be recalled to the national team. In 2008, however, after three years an absentee, he did return to the Brazilian squad for a special testimonial match marking the retirement of his long-time teammate, Júnior Negão, in which he took the opportunity to add another goal to his record tally.

In 2009, whilst playing in the Brazilian National (club) Championship, Neném suffered a knee injury. Aged 36, its severity ultimately forced him to retire from playing beach soccer, locking-in his final goal tally for Brazil at 337.

With his playing days now over, Neném moved to Qatar to become the new head coach of the country's beach soccer team in 2011. He managed the team until 2018, leading them through multiple editions of the AFC Beach Soccer Championship.

== Style of play ==
Neném was well known for being the most lethal of goal poachers, gifted with both feet. Whilst his capacity for finishing was highlighted most often during his playing time, his keen understanding of the game, ability to juggle the ball, and speed have also been noted.

He has been compared to the likes of Garrincha and Romário.

== Personal life ==
Neném was raised on Babylon Hill in the Leme district of Rio de Janeiro. He is the father of three children – two sons, Kayke (b. 1993) and Caio (b. 1995), and one daughter, Kyra Carol (b. 2001).

For many years, Neném has been critical of modern beach soccer, claiming that it is now too "robotised" and that the players lack joy and a connection with the crowd when playing, compared to his experience of competing in the early days of the sport in the 1990s.

== Honours ==
The following is a selection, not an exhaustive list, of the major international honours Neném achieved:

=== Country ===
- Beach Soccer World Championships
  - Winner (8): 1995, 1996, 1997, 1998, 2000, 2002, 2003, 2004
- Mundialito
  - Winner (6): 1994, 1997, 2000, 2001, 2002, 2004
- Copa Latina
  - Winner (4): 1998, 2002, 2003, 2004

=== Individual ===
- FIFA Beach Soccer World Cup (2):
  - Silver Ball: 2005
  - Silver Shoe: 2005
- Beach Soccer World Championships (3):
  - Top scorer: 2002, 2003
  - Best player: 2002
- Mundialito (6):
  - Top scorer: 1997, 1998, 2000, 2001, 2004
  - Best player: 1997
- Copa Latina (3):
  - Top scorer: 1998, 2004
  - Best player: 1998
