= Júnior Negão (beach soccer) =

Brazilian beach soccer player

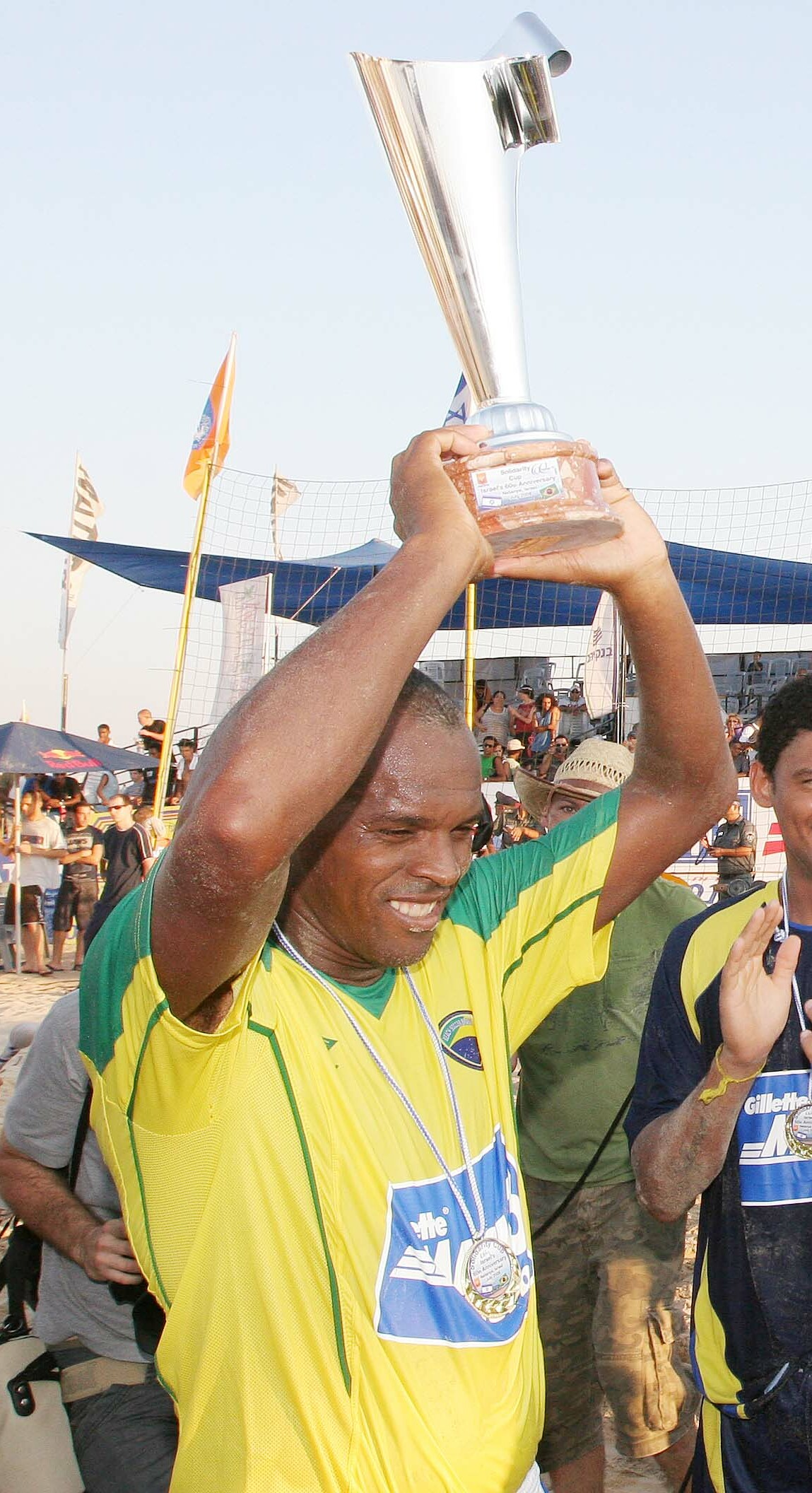
- Júnior Negão in 2008.

Personal information
- Full name: Hilton Santos Júnior
- Date of birth: 29 March 1964 (age 62) (Note: Sources vary quoting both 1964 and 1965 as his year of birth; 1964 is shown here as this is the year of birth FIFA quoted in official competition documents.)
- Place of birth: Rio de Janeiro, Brazil
- Height: 1.83 m (6 ft 0 in)
- Position: Defender

International career
Years	Team	Apps	(Gls)
1993–2008	Brazil	318	(318 (Note: Sources vary. His goals figure before his last match was widely reported as 316 and he scored one goal in said match to seemingly take his final tally to 317. However, the Brazilian Beach Soccer Confederation (CBSB) states his goals figure at 318. FIFA.com quoted his figure at 315 goals prior to the start of the 2008 World Cup in which he scored two goals; plus the one goal scored in his final game would also equal 318 goals. Meanwhile, the Brazilian Football Confederation (CBF) states his goals figure at 319.))

Managerial career
- 2012–2014, 2015: Brazil
Medal record
Representing Brazil
Men's Beach soccer
Beach Soccer World Championships
Winner	1995 Rio de Janeiro
Winner	1996 Rio de Janeiro
Winner	1997 Rio de Janeiro
Winner	1998 Rio de Janeiro
Winner	1999 Rio de Janeiro
Winner	2000 Rio de Janeiro
Winner	2002 Vitoria
Winner	2003 Rio de Janeiro
Winner	2004 Rio de Janeiro
FIFA Beach Soccer World Cup
Third place	2005 Rio de Janeiro
Winner	2006 Rio de Janeiro
Winner	2007 Rio de Janeiro
Winner	2008 Marseille

Hilton Santos Júnior (born 29 March 1964), better known as Júnior Negão, is a Brazilian former beach soccer player who played as a defender for the Brazil national team. He is considered to be one of the greatest players to play the sport, FIFA.com describing his career as "incomparable" upon his retirement; Swiss coach Angelo Schirinzi named him as part of his all-time beach soccer dream team in 2021. After retiring he undertook two spells as head coach of Brazil.

== Career ==
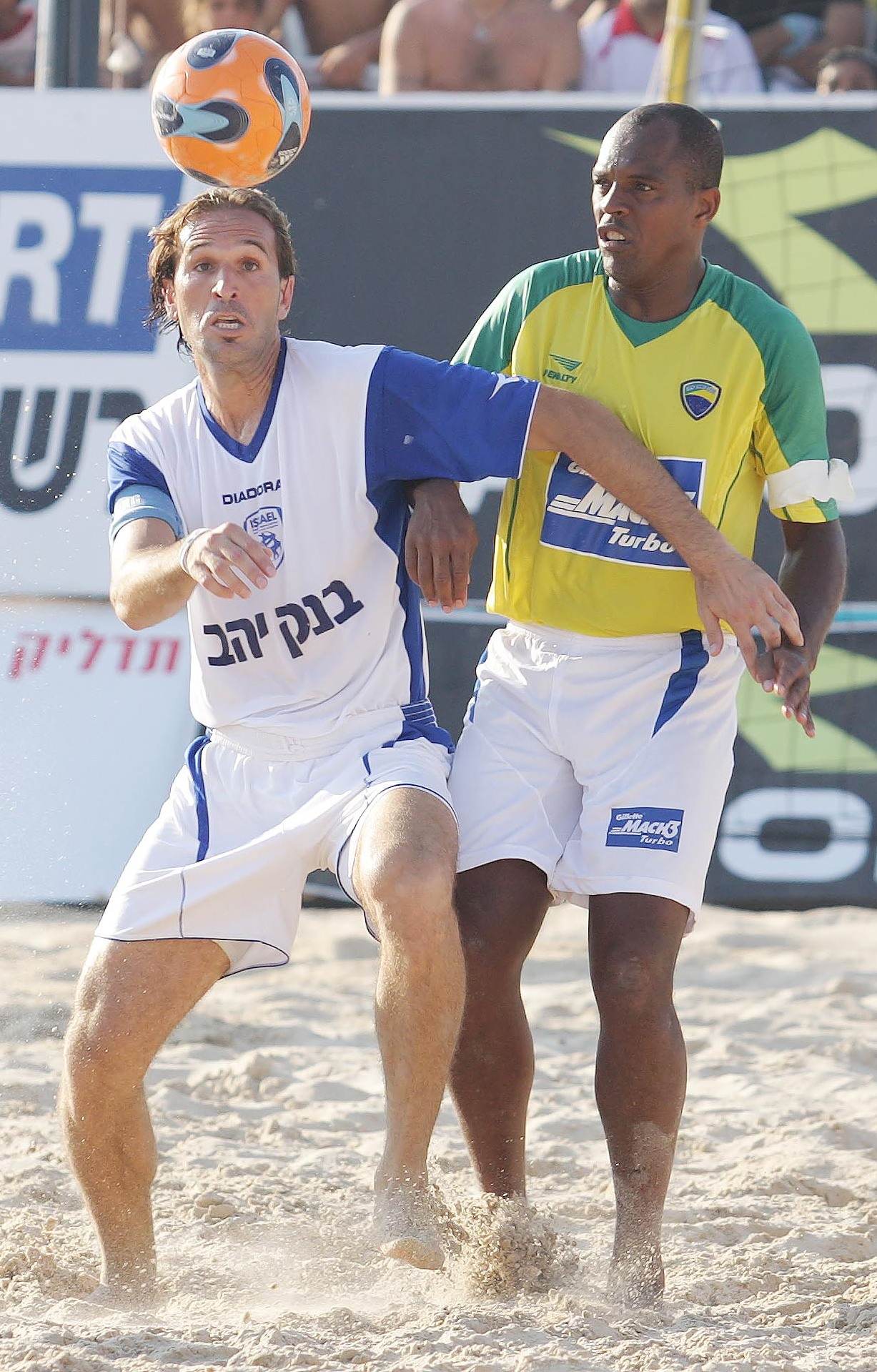
Júnior Negão battling for the ball versus Israel in 2008.

As a youth, Júnior Negão developed as an association football player. He was first on the books of Flamengo from 1981, having been spotted by Sebastião Lazaroni playing football on the beach, and later with Fluminense in 1984. However, he made he debut as a senior pro for América Mineiro, in 1985, for whom he played until 1988 when he then moved on to spend a series short spells with other clubs in multiple countries.

In 1993, aged 29, Júnior Negão was invited to play for the newly formed Brazil beach soccer team, to complement aging former football stars also comprising the team such as Paulo Sérgio, Júnior (from whom his nickname was derived), Cláudio Adão and Edinho; the latter claimed he "bet everything" on mentoring Júnior Negão with the belief he would be a success. He would go on to represent Brazil from the team's maiden international match against the United States (notably scoring Brazil's first ever goal), until his retirement in 2008 aged 44, during which time he won over 40 trophies with the team. By 1998, he was already on the verge of scoring 100 goals for Brazil, and now ranks second for Brazil in terms of most goals scored and third in terms of most games played, with over 300 each. He was world champion on 12 occasions (nine World Championships and three FIFA World Cups; he is the third top scorer in the history of the former, and won the latter as Brazil's captain). After making his landmark 300th appearance for Brazil in December 2007, he initially planned to retire after the 2008 World Cup final against Italy, but actually ended-up participating in that year's Mundialito the next month, eventually playing his final match in December of that year, a testimonial to his 15-year career.

Since retiring as a player, Júnior Negão has twice served as head coach of Brazil. He was first appointed in late 2012 as successor to Guga Zloccowick, amid a time of chaos and confusion regarding the rightful governing body of the sport in Brazil. Under his leadership, Brazil exited the 2013 World Cup at the semifinals for just the second time. Júnior Negão was later dismissed from his post in late 2014. However, his removal was short-lived; upon the governance disputes finally being resolved in June 2015, Júnior Negão was immediately reinstated as head coach by the Brazilian Football Confederation (CBF). However, this was a mere four weeks before the upcoming World Cup; Brazil then suffered their worst ever world cup result, as they were eliminated in the quarterfinals. Júnior Negão was subsequently demoted to technical coordinator in late 2015, with Gilberto Costa replacing him as head coach. Despite these results, he was responsible for bringing into the squad now celebrated talents such as Bruno Xavier, Mauricinho and Lucão, and in his role as technical coordinator, he helped steer the team to a fifth World Cup title in 2017.

== Statistics ==
Player statistics

Competition	Year	Apps	Goals	Ref.
FIFA Beach Soccer World Cup	(Brazil) 2005	5	3	
FIFA Beach Soccer World Cup	(Brazil) 2006	6	9	
FIFA Beach Soccer World Cup	(Brazil) 2007	6	4	
FIFA Beach Soccer World Cup	(France) 2008	6	2	
Total		23	18	—

Managerial statistics

Note: Dates below refer to the news of appointment and dismissal when reported in media, and record incorporates all matches played by the team within those dates.

Team	From	To	Record					Ref.
Team	From	To	P	W	W+	L	Win %	Ref.
Brazil	28 December 2012	27 October 2014	49	42	3	4	91.8%	,
Brazil	15 June 2015	16 December 2015	7	6	0	1	85.7%	
Total			56	48	3	5	91.1%	

== Honours ==
The following is not intended to be an exhaustive list

=== Team ===
As a player

- World cups
  - Beach Soccer World Championships
    - Winner (9): 1995, 1996, 1997, 1998, 1999, 2000, 2002, 2003, 2004
  - FIFA Beach Soccer World Cup
    - Winner (3): 2006, 2007, 2008
- Mundialito
  - Winner (9): 1994, 1997, 1999, 2000, 2001, 2002, 2004, 2005, 2007
- Copa Latina
  - Winner (8): 1998, 1999, 2001, 2002, 2003, 2004, 2005, 2006
- CONMEBOL qualifiers for the FIFA Beach Soccer World Cup
  - Winner (3): 2005, 2006, 2008

As a manager

- South American Beach Games
  - Gold medal (1): 2014

As technical coordinator

- FIFA Beach Soccer World Cup
  - Winner (1): 2017

=== Individual ===
- Copa Latina (2):
  - Top scorer: 2001
  - Best player: 2002
- CONMEBOL qualifiers for the FIFA Beach Soccer World Cup
  - Best player: 2005
