= 2001 Beach Soccer World Championships =

VII Beach Soccer World Championships 2001

Tournament details
- Host country: Brazil
- Dates: 11–18 February
- Teams: 12 (from 3 confederations)
- Venue: 1 (in 1 host city)

Final positions
- Champions: Portugal (1st title)
- Runners-up: France
- Third place: Argentina
- Fourth place: Brazil

Tournament statistics
- Matches played: 20
- Goals scored: 144 (7.2 per match)
- Top scorer: (Portugal) Alan (10 goals)
- Best player: (Portugal) Hernâni
- Best goalkeeper: (France) Pascal Olmeta

The 2001 Beach Soccer World Championships was the seventh edition of the Beach Soccer World Championships, the most prestigious competition in international beach soccer contested by men's national teams until 2005, when the competition was then replaced by the second iteration of a world cup in beach soccer, the better known FIFA Beach Soccer World Cup. It was organised by Brazilian sports agency Koch Tavares (one of the founding partners of Beach Soccer Worldwide).

For the first time since its establishment in 1995, the tournament took place outside of the sport's native home of Rio de Janeiro and instead was hosted at the resort of Costa do Sauipe, in the state of Bahia, approximately 70km north of the major city of Salvador.

It was also the first time that hosts and six-time defending champions Brazil did not win the championships, finishing in fourth, as Portugal beat France in the final to claim their first title.

== Organisation ==
Having increased the number of participating teams in 1999, these championships continued to consist of twelve nations who were split into four groups of three playing in a round robin format. The top two from each group advanced to the quarter-finals from which point on the championship was played as a knock-out tournament until a winner was crowned with an additional match to determine third place.

The draw for the allocation of the twelve nations into the four groups was conducted on January 14 in Villa-Lobos State Park in São Paulo.

A representative of FIFA, Alfredo Asfura, attended the finals to assess the sport's premier event to understand the suitability of potentially incorporating beach soccer into the FIFA family. His post-competition analysis of the sport was that beach soccer was full of "prosperity" and that the "experience, professionalism and seriousness of the organization [of the event] will be fundamental for FIFA" in deciding where or not to adopt the sport in the future. FIFA ultimately took over as governing body of beach soccer in late 2004.

Rede Globo were responsible for broadcasting the games in Brazil, which caused controversy in Portuguese media when the network decided to show the third place play off involving the Brazil national team but subsequently not show the final.

== Teams ==
Asia, Africa and Oceania were unrepresented.

European Zone (6):

- Spain
- Portugal
- Italy
- France
- Germany
- Turkey^{1}

North American Zone (1):

- United States

South American Zone (4):

- Peru
- Venezuela
- Uruguay
- Argentina

Hosts:

- Brazil (South America)

Notes:

1. Teams making their debut

== Group stage ==
Matches are listed as local time in Salvador, (BRST / UTC-2)

=== Group A ===
Pos	Team	Pld	W	W+	L	GF	GA	GD	Pts	Qualification
1	Brazil	2	2	0	0	21	3	+18	6	Advance to knockout stage
2	Italy	2	1	0	1	4	13	–9	3	Advance to knockout stage
3	Germany	2	0	0	2	5	14	–9	0	

February 11, 2001
10:00

Brazil	10–3	Germany
Junior Negão; Neném; Jorginho (pen.); Benjamin; Júnior	Report	Ferry; Högi

Costa do Sauipe

February 13, 2001
19:20

Brazil	11–0	Italy
Junior; Neném; Duda; Edgar; Magal; Jorginho	Report

Costa do Sauipe

February 14, 2001
18:10

Italy	4–2	Germany
?^{1} ?^{1} ?^{1} ?^{1}	Report	Högi; Ferry

Costa do Sauipe

=== Group B ===
Pos	Team	Pld	W	W+	L	GF	GA	GD	Pts	Qualification
1	France	2	2	0	0	11	6	+5	6	Advance to knockout stage
2	Peru	2	1	0	1	8	9	–1	3	Advance to knockout stage
3	Venezuela	2	0	0	2	7	11	–4	0	

February 12, 2001
19:00

Peru	5–4	Venezuela
Drago; Barco; Buchanam; Valdelomar; Oblitas	Report	Tovar; Edgar; Heatkliff

Costa do Sauipe

February 13, 2001
17:00

France	6–3	Venezuela
Cantona; Cardoso; Squaglia; Ottavy	Report	Heatkliff; Roberto; Edgar

Costa do Sauipe

February 14, 2001
20:30

Peru	3–5	France
Valdelomar ^{2} Oblitas	Report	Cantona (o.g.) Budge; Cardoso; J. Cantona; Bonora

Costa do Sauipe

=== Group C ===
Pos	Team	Pld	W	W+	L	GF	GA	GD	Pts	Qualification
1	Portugal	2	2	0	0	9	3	+6	6	Advance to knockout stage
2	United States	2	1	0	1	5	4	+1	3	Advance to knockout stage
3	Uruguay	2	0	0	2	1	8	–7	0	

February 11, 2001
08:30

Portugal	5–1	Uruguay
Alan; João António; Hernâni	Report	Peti

Costa do Sauipe

February 13, 2001
18:10

United States	2–4	Portugal
Jevin	Report	Alan; Madjer

Costa do Sauipe

February 14, 2001
17:00

United States	3–0	Uruguay
Chris; Adrian; Beto	Report

Costa do Sauipe

=== Group D ===
Pos	Team	Pld	W	W+	L	GF	GA	GD	Pts	Qualification
1	Argentina	2	2	0	0	6	0	+6	6	Advance to knockout stage
2	Spain	2	1	0	1	2	4	–2	3	Advance to knockout stage
3	Turkey	2	0	0	2	1	5	–4	0	

February 12, 2001

Spain	2–1	Turkey
David ?^{1}	Report	?^{1}

Costa do Sauipe

February 13, 2001
20:30

Argentina	3–0	Turkey
Carlos Russo; Maty	Report

Costa do Sauipe

February 14, 2001
19:20

Argentina	3–0	Spain
Fede; Maty	Report

Costa do Sauipe

== Knockout stage ==
February 16th was allocated as a rest day.

Quarter finals
15 February
France (a.e.t.)	5
Italy	4
15 February
Argentina	5
United States	1
15 February
Brazil	7
Peru	1
15 February
Portugal	1
Spain	0

Semi-finals
17 February
France	6
Argentina	5
17 February
Brazil	5
Portugal (a.e.t.)	6

Final
18 February
France	3
Portugal	9
Third place play-off
18 February
Argentina	4
Brazil	2

=== Quarter finals ===
February 15, 2001
17:00

France	5–4 (a.e.t.)	Italy
Solda; Olmeta; Bonora^{3} Cantona^{3} Germain	Report	Fruzzetti^{4} Albore; Garbagna

Costa do Sauipe

February 15, 2001
18:10

Argentina	5–1	United States
Topo; Carlos Russo; Maty	Report	Beto

Costa do Sauipe

February 15, 2001
19:20

Brazil	7–1	Peru
Neném; Benjamin ?^{1} ?^{1} ?^{1}	Report	Budge

Costa do Sauipe

February 15, 2001
20:30

Portugal	1–0	Spain
Barraca	Report

Costa do Sauipe

=== Semi-finals ===
February 17, 2001
09:00

Portugal	6–5 (a.e.t.)	Brazil
Madjer; Hernâni; Alan	Report	Jorginho; Junior Negão; Neném

Costa do Sauipe

February 17, 2001
10:00

France	6–5	Argentina
Squaglia ?^{1} ?^{1} ?^{1} ?^{1} ?^{1}	Report	Tano; Carlos Russo ?^{1}

Costa do Sauipe

=== Third place play-off ===
Daylight saving ended on the morning of the 18th. The time shown is UTC-3.

February 18, 2001
08:30

Argentina	4–2	Brazil
Carlos Russo; Topo; Coco; Petrasso	Report	Benjamin; Jorginho

Costa do Sauipe

=== Final ===
February 18, 2001
10:00

Portugal	9–3	France
Alan; Hernâni; Barraca; Madjer; Nunes	Report	Ottavy; Cantona

Costa do Sauipe
Notes:

1. Scorer not stated in report
2. Report is unclear, Oblitas may of scored this goal
3. Report is unclear, note the possibility this is not the scorer
4. Report is unclear, Garbagna, or another player, may of scored this goal

== Winners ==
2001 Beach Soccer World Championships
champions

Portugal
First title

== Awards ==
Top scorer
(Portugal) Alan
10 goals
Best player
(Portugal) Hernâni
Best goalkeeper
(France) Pascal Olmeta

== Final standings ==
Pos	Grp	Team	Pld	W	W+	L	GF	GA	GD	Pts	Final result
1	C	Portugal	5	4	1	0	25	11	+14	14	Champions
2	B	France	5	3	1	1	25	24	+1	11	Runners-up
3	D	Argentina	5	4	0	1	20	9	+11	12	Third place
4	A	Brazil	5	3	0	2	35	14	+21	9	Fourth place
5	C	United States	3	1	0	2	6	9	−3	3	Eliminated in the quarter finals
6	D	Spain	2	1	0	1	2	5	−3	3	Eliminated in the quarter finals
7	B	Peru	3	1	0	2	9	16	−7	3	Eliminated in the quarter finals
8	A	Italy	3	1	0	2	8	18	−10	3	Eliminated in the quarter finals
9	B	Venezuela	2	0	0	2	7	11	−4	0	Eliminated in the group stage
10	D	Turkey	2	0	0	2	1	5	−4	0	Eliminated in the group stage
11	C	Uruguay	2	0	0	2	1	8	−7	0	Eliminated in the group stage
12	A	Germany	2	0	0	2	5	14	−9	0	Eliminated in the group stage
