= 1995 Beach Soccer World Championships =

I Mundial de futebol de areia
- Official logo

Tournament details
- Host country: Brazil
- Dates: January 24–29
- Teams: 8 (from 3 confederations)
- Venue: 1 (in 1 host city)

Final positions
- Champions: Brazil (1st title)
- Runners-up: United States
- Third place: England
- Fourth place: Italy

Tournament statistics
- Matches played: 16
- Goals scored: 149 (9.31 per match)
- Top scorer(s): (Brazil) Zico (Italy) Altobelli (12 goals)
- Best player(s): (Brazil) Zico (Brazil) Júnior
- Best goalkeeper: (Brazil) Paulo Sérgio

The 1995 Beach Soccer World Championships was the first edition of the Beach Soccer World Championships, the most prestigious competition in international beach soccer contested by men's national teams until 2005, when the competition was then replaced by the second iteration of a world cup in beach soccer, the better known FIFA Beach Soccer World Cup. It was organised by Brazilian sports agency Koch Tavares (one of the founding partners of Beach Soccer Worldwide).

The tournament took place at Copacabana Beach in Rio de Janeiro, Brazil. The hosts and heavy favourites Brazil won the tournament by beating the United States 8–1 in the final, coming from behind to claim their first world title.

The tournament was immediately deemed a success, leading to the instant scheduling of a second World Cup the following year.

The event was notable for featuring many high-profile ex-association footballers, fuelling its popularity, including the likes of the Brazilians Zico, Júnior and Cláudio Adão, Italian 1982 World Cup winners Alessandro Altobelli and Claudio Gentile, Franco Causio, England's Gary Stevens and Luther Blissett, and brothers René and Willy van de Kerkhof of the Netherlands' 1978 World Cup runners-up squad.

== Background ==
In 1994, Koch Tavares organised the first international beach soccer competition in Brazil, the Mundialito de beach soccer, a small 4-team event, in view of understanding how commercially successful beach soccer could be in the region. It featured Brazil, Argentina, Italy and the United States and was dubbed an "unofficial World Cup". The Mundialito was deemed a huge success, which gave Koch Tavares the incentive to organise a fully-fledged international competition. This conception materialised a year later in 1995 as this, the maiden Beach Soccer World Championships – a larger and longer eight team event compared to the Mundialito.

== Organisation ==
Format

The following format was decided upon by the organisers for the maiden edition of the championships: the eight participating nations competed in two groups of four teams in a round robin format. The top two teams progressed straight to the semi-finals from which point on the championship was played as a knock-out tournament until a winner was crowned with an additional match to determine third place.

Miscellaneous

The launch of the tournament took place from 12:30 onwards on January 18 at the Rio Internacional Hotel which involved the press and guests attending to see the opening presentation of the World Championships as well as explanations of the rules of the newly founded sport and the tournament's schedule. Furthermore, the Brazilian team was also revealed to the press and engaged in interviews.

The presence of Zico as part of the Brazilian squad, who made over 70 appearances for the Brazilian national association football team, gained considerable attention in the local press prior to the start of the championship. Zico revealed at the launch he accepted an invitation from his friend and Brazilian team captain, Júnior, to play at the event, despite claiming to be "out of shape" now aged 41, having retired from football a year earlier.

Following the launch, official training for the World Championships began the next day on January 19 on pitches external to the beach arena, in front of Copacabana Palace, concluding with training sessions inside the arena on January 23.

The draw to split the eight teams into Groups A and B was conducted on January 21 at the Rio Internacional Hotel. Brazil and Argentina were allocated as heads of the two respective groups, with the other six teams then drawn to accompany them.

The Championships were part of the 1st Olympic Summer Festival (Festival Olímpico de Verão), taking place in the Copacabana beach arena with a capacity of 12,000. Entry to all games was free of charge for fans.

In total, US$1 million (1.6 million in 2017) was invested into the organisation of the tournament, including payment for the players who participated.

== Teams ==
There was no qualification process for the first Beach Soccer World Championships; nations were simply invited to play. However, such invites were not random – specific nations were summoned.

Koch Tavares, the tournament organisers, decided that as the first World Cup of beach soccer, since the sport is a derivative of association football, it would be fitting for the six winners of the FIFA World Cup of football throughout history (as of 1995) to field a team in Rio (being hosts Brazil, Argentina, Italy, Uruguay, England and Germany) and as such the aforementioned nations were invited to play, all of which accepted the opportunity.

To make up the numbers, the Netherlands and the United States, despite having never won a FIFA World Cup title, were also invited as "guests".

Africa, Asia and Oceania were unrepresented.

European Zone (4):

- England
- Germany
- Italy
- Netherlands

North American Zone (1):

- United States

South American Zone (2):

- Argentina
- Uruguay

Hosts:

- Brazil (South America)

== Group stage ==
=== Group A ===
Pos	Team	Pld	W	W+	L	GF	GA	GD	Pts	Qualification
1	Brazil	3	3	0	0	31	8	+23	9	Advance to knockout stage
2	Italy	3	2	0	1	15	15	0	6	Advance to knockout stage
3	Uruguay	3	1	0	2	18	18	0	3	
4	Netherlands	3	0	0	3	7	30	–23	0	

January 24, 1995

Italy	7–6	Uruguay

Copacabana beach
January 24, 1995

Brazil	16–2	Netherlands

Copacabana beach

January 25, 1995

Italy	6–1	Netherlands

Copacabana beach
January 25, 1995

Brazil	7–4	Uruguay

Copacabana beach

January 26, 1995

Uruguay	8–4	Netherlands

Copacabana beach
January 26, 1995

Brazil	8–2	Italy

Copacabana beach

=== Group B ===
Pos	Team	Pld	W	W+	L	GF	GA	GD	Pts	Qualification
1	United States	3	3	0	0	11	4	+7	9	Advance to knockout stage
2	England	3	1	0	2	11	12	–1	3	Advance to knockout stage
3	Germany	3	1	0	2	8	12	–4	3	
4	Argentina	3	1	0	2	4	6	–2	3	

Note:
- Argentina, England and Germany were tied on 3 points each and one win against each other and the same goal difference (0) in their head-to-head records.
- The nations were then ranked based on goals scored in the matches between the three in the head-to-head results (ENG 9, GER 7, ARG 3).

January 24, 1995

United States	5–1	Germany

Copacabana beach
January 24, 1995

Argentina	3–2	England

Copacabana beach

January 25, 1995

England	7–6	Germany

Copacabana beach
January 25, 1995

United States	3–1	Argentina

Copacabana beach

January 26, 1995

Germany	1–0	Argentina

Copacabana beach
January 26, 1995

United States	3–2	England

Copacabana beach

== Knockout stage ==
January 27 was allocated as a rest day.

=== Semi-finals ===
January 28, 1995

United States	4–3	Italy

Copacabana beach

January 28, 1995

Brazil	13–2	England

Copacabana beach

=== Third place play-off ===
January 29, 1995
09:00 UTC-2

England	7–6	Italy
Osman 14'; Blissett 20', 34', 36'; Cunningham 25', 36' (pen.); Stevens 35'	Report	6' Causio; 8' (pen.), 9' (pen.), 31' Altobelli; 14', 26' Soldá

Copacabana beach
Referee: Edmundo Lima Filho

=== Final ===
January 29, 1995
10:00 UTC-2

Brazil	8–1	United States
Neném 14'; Zico 17', 19' (pen.); Renan 18' (pen.), 36'; Edinho 24'; Júnior Negão 27'	Report	9' Thompson

Copacabana beach
Attendance: 12,000
Referee: José Roberto Wright

== Winners ==
1995 Beach Soccer World Championships
champions

Brazil
First title

== Awards ==
Top scorers
(Brazil) Zico	(Italy) Alessandro Altobelli
12 goals
Best players
(Brazil) Júnior	(Brazil) Zico
Best goalkeeper
(Brazil) Paulo Sérgio

== Final standings ==
Pos	Grp	Team	Pld	W	W+	L	GF	GA	GD	Pts	Final result
1	A	Brazil	5	5	0	0	52	11	+41	15	Champions
2	B	United States	5	4	0	1	16	15	+1	12	Runners-up
3	B	England	5	2	0	3	20	31	−11	6	Third place
4	A	Italy	5	2	0	3	24	26	−2	6	Fourth place
5	A	Germany	3	1	0	2	8	12	−4	3	Eliminated in Group stage
6	B	Uruguay	3	1	0	2	18	18	0	3	Eliminated in Group stage
7	B	Argentina	3	1	0	2	4	6	−2	3	Eliminated in Group stage
8	A	Netherlands	3	0	0	3	7	30	−23	0	Eliminated in Group stage
