= Jorginho (beach soccer) =

Brazilian beach soccer player

Personal information
- Full name: Jorge Augusto da Cunha Gabriel
- Date of birth: 17 October 1974 (age 52)
- Place of birth: Belém, Brazil
- Height: 1.75 m (5 ft 9 in)
- Position: Winger

Senior career*
Years	Team	Apps	(Gls)
1999–2003	Vasco da Gama		
2008	Catanzaro		
2010–2012	Vasco da Gama		
2012–2013	Kristall		
2013–2018	Vasco da Gama		

International career^{‡}
1994–2019	Brazil	303	(316)
Medal record
Men's beach soccer
Beach Soccer World Championships
Winner	1995 BS World Championships
Winner	1996 BS World Championships
Winner	1997 BS World Championships
Winner	1998 BS World Championships
Winner	1999 BS World Championships
Winner	2000 BS World Championships
Winner	2002 BS World Championships
Winner	2003 BS World Championships
Winner	2004 BS World Championships
FIFA Beach Soccer World Cup
Third place	2005 FIFA Beach Soccer World Cup
Winner	2006 FIFA Beach Soccer World Cup
Winner	2007 FIFA Beach Soccer World Cup
Winner	2008 FIFA Beach Soccer World Cup
Winner	2009 FIFA Beach Soccer World Cup
Second place	2011 FIFA Beach Soccer World Cup
Third place	2013 FIFA Beach Soccer World Cup
Winner	2017 FIFA Beach Soccer World Cup
FIFA Beach Soccer World Cup qualification (CONMEBOL)
Winner	2005 FIFA BS WC qualification
Winner	2006 FIFA BS WC qualification
Winner	2011 FIFA BS WC qualification
Mundialito
Winner	1996 Mundialito
Winner	1997 Mundialito
Winner	1999 Mundialito
Winner	2000 Mundialito
Winner	2001 Mundialito
Winner	2004 Mundialito
Winner	2011 Mundialito
Copa América
Winner	1994 Copa América
Winner	1995 Copa América
Winner	1996 Copa América
Winner	1997 Copa América
Winner	1998 Copa América
Winner	1999 Copa América
Winner	2003 Copa América
Winner	2012 Copa América
Intercontinental Cup
Second place	2011 Intercontinental Cup
ODESUR Beach Games
Gold medal – first place	2011 ODESUR Beach Games
Miami Cup
Winner	2011 Miami Cup
Brazil Cup (Beach Soccer)
Winner	2012 Brazil Cup (II Edition)
Second place	2011 Brazil Cup (I Edition)
RJ-SP Tournament (Beach Soccer)
Winner	2010 RJ-SP Tournament
- * Club domestic league appearances and goals as of 2018 ‡ National team caps and goals as of 2019

Jorge Augusto da Cunha Gabriel (born 17 October 1974), better known as Jorginho, is a Brazilian former beach soccer player who played as a winger for the Brazil national beach soccer team. Widely regarded as one of the sport’s all-time greats, he is also one of the top scorers in Brazil beach soccer history.

== Beach soccer career ==
Born in Belém, Jorginho grew up in Rio de Janeiro. After winning a tournament, he was noticed by Léo Júnior and asked to play for the Brazilian national team. He represented Brazil during a period of sustained international success. He contributed to Brazil’s eight Beach Soccer World Championship titles between 1996 and 2004 and participated in the FIFA Beach Soccer World Cup, where Brazil won in 2006, 2007, 2008, 2009, and 2017. The team also finished as runners-up in 2011 and secured third place in 2005 and 2013. In regional qualifiers, he was part of the squads that won the CONMEBOL qualification tournaments in 2005, 2006, and 2011. Beyond the World Cup circuit, Jorginho earned multiple titles at the Mundialito (1996, 1997, 1999, 2000, 2001, 2004, 2011) and the Copa América (1994, 1995, 1996, 1997, 1998, 1999, 2003, 2012). His domestic honors include the Brazil Cup (winner in 2012, runner-up in 2011) and the RJ–SP Tournament in 2010. He also took part in Brazil’s gold medal run at the 2011 ODESUR Beach Games and was part of the team that won the 2011 Miami Cup, while finishing as runner-up in the 2011 Intercontinental Cup. He played his final game in a testimonial match for Brazil, post-retirement, in 2019.

== Retirement ==
Jorginho announced his retirement from competitive beach soccer in 2018, concluding a career that spanned over two decades. In January 2019, he made a final appearance in a testimonial match in Brazil, where he shared the pitch with Ronaldinho, a close friend and fellow Rio native. The event celebrated Jorginho’s contributions to the sport and drew thousands of fans.

== Honours ==
=== International ===
- Beach Soccer World Championship
  - Winner: 1996, 1997, 1998, 1999, 2000, 2002, 2003, 2004
- FIFA Beach Soccer World Cup
  - Winner: 2006, 2007, 2008, 2009, 2017
  - Runner-up: 2011
  - Third place: 2005, 2013
- FIFA Beach Soccer World Cup qualification (CONMEBOL)
  - Winner: 2005, 2006, 2011
  - Third place: 2013
- Mundialito
  - Winner: 1996, 1997, 1999, 2000, 2001, 2004, 2011
- Copa América
  - Winner: 1994, 1995, 1996, 1997, 1998, 1999, 2003, 2012, 2013
- South American Championship
  - Winner: 2016
- Copa das Naçoes
  - Winner: 2013
- Intercontinental Cup
  - Runner-up: 2011, 2012
- South American Beach Games
  - Gold medalist: 2011
- Miami Cup
  - Winner: 2011
- Copa Ciudad de Encarnación
  - Winner: 2012

=== Domestic ===
==== Vasco da Gama ====
- Mundialito de Clubes
  - Winner: 2011
  - Runner-up: 2015
  - Third place: 2012, 2013
- Copa Libertadores
  - Winner: 2016, 2017
  - Runner-up: 2018
- Campeonato Brasileiro
  - Winner: 2017
- Copa do Brasil
  - Winner: 2012, 2014
  - Runner-up: 2011
- Circuito Brasil de Futebol de Areia
  - Winner: 2013–14
- Torneio Rio–São Paulo
  - Winner: 2010
- Campeonato Carioca
  - Winner: 1999, 2003, 2014, 2018
- Desafio Fair Play de Beach Soccer
  - Winner: 2013

==== Kristall ====
- Russian Beach Soccer Championships
  - Winner: 2013
  - Runner-up: 2012

=== Individual accolades ===
- Beach Soccer World Championship
  - 'Golden Ball: 1999, 2004
- Mundialito
  - MVP: 2004
