= List of world cups in beach soccer =

World cups in beach soccer

Beach Soccer World Championships (1995–2004) FIFA Beach Soccer World Cup (2005–present)
- Founded
- 1995; 31 years ago
- Editions held
- 23
- Region
- International (FIFA)
- Number of teams
- 16 (since 2006)
- Current champions
- Brazil (16th title; 2025)
- Most successful team
- Brazil (16 titles)

In competitive beach soccer, the world cup is the sport's paramount competition. It is contested by senior men's national teams.

To date, two iterations of a world cup in beach soccer have existed. The first was the Beach Soccer World Championships which ran annually from 1995 to 2004. FIFA then became the governing body of the sport. As a result, the World Championships were abolished and replaced by the second and current iteration, the FIFA Beach Soccer World Cup, which began in 2005 and was also held annually; since 2009, it has been a biennial event. Whilst being two independently governed competitions, both have occurred to determine the same outcome: the world champions in beach soccer.

Four nations have been crowned world champions of the 23 editions to date. By far the most successful team is Brazil (also current champions) who have historically dominated the title, winning 16; they and Portugal are the only two nations to win in both eras of the sport's world cup. The other victors are Russia and France.

The following lists a summary of the results of each world cup and associated statistics; the latter combines the data of all the editions of both iterations.

== List of world cups ==
The numbers in parentheses indicate the total number of world titles won by that team as of that victory.

=== Beach Soccer World Championships (1995–2004) ===
#	Year	Champions	Runners-up	Third place	Fourth place
1	(Brazil) 1995	Brazil (1)	United States	England	Italy
2	(Brazil) 1996	Brazil (2)	Uruguay	Italy	United States
3	(Brazil) 1997	Brazil (3)	Uruguay	United States	Argentina
4	(Brazil) 1998	Brazil (4)	France	Uruguay	Peru
5	(Brazil) 1999	Brazil (5)	Portugal	Uruguay	Peru
6	(Brazil) 2000	Brazil (6)	Peru	Spain	Japan
7	(Brazil) 2001	Portugal (1)	France	Argentina	Brazil
8	(Brazil) 2002	Brazil (7)	Portugal	Uruguay	Thailand
9	(Brazil) 2003	Brazil (8)	Spain	Portugal	France
10	(Brazil) 2004	Brazil (9)	Spain	Portugal	Italy

=== FIFA Beach Soccer World Cup (2005–present) ===
#	Year	Champions	Runners-up	Third place	Fourth place
11	(Brazil) 2005	France (1)	Portugal	Brazil	Japan
12	(Brazil) 2006	Brazil (10)	Uruguay	France	Portugal
13	(Brazil) 2007	Brazil (11)	Mexico	Uruguay	France
14	(France) 2008	Brazil (12)	Italy	Portugal	Spain
15	(United Arab Emirates) 2009	Brazil (13)	Switzerland	Portugal	Uruguay
16	(Italy) 2011	Russia (1)	Brazil	Portugal	El Salvador
17	(French Polynesia) 2013	Russia (2)	Spain	Brazil	Tahiti
18	(Portugal) 2015	Portugal (2)	Tahiti	Russia	Italy
19	(The Bahamas) 2017	Brazil (14)	Tahiti	Iran	Italy
20	(Paraguay) 2019	Portugal (3)	Italy	Russia	Japan
21	(Russia) 2021	RFU (3)	Japan	Switzerland	Senegal
22	(United Arab Emirates) 2024	Brazil (15)	Italy	Iran	Belarus
23	(Seychelles) 2025	Brazil (16)	Belarus	Portugal	Senegal

== Statistics ==
=== Successful nations ===
The following lists the teams that have finished in the top four.

Overall, 20 nations have made at least one top four finish. Of those 20 nations, only seven have made a top four finish in both iterations of the competition. Brazil remained the only nation to finish in the final four of every championship until 2015 when they finished in fifth place.

Team	Titles	Years	Runners-up	Years	3rd place	Years	4th place	Years	Total
Brazil	16	1995*, 1996*, 1997*, 1998*, 1999*, 2000*, 2002*, 2003*, 2004*, 2006*, 2007*, 2008, 2009, 2017, 2024, 2025	1	2011	2	2005*, 2013	1	2001*	20
Portugal	3	2001, 2015*, 2019	3	1999, 2002, 2005	6	2003, 2004, 2008, 2009, 2011, 2025	1	2006	13
Russia	3	2011, 2013, 2021*	0		2	2015, 2019	0		5
France	1	2005	2	1998, 2001	1	2006	2	2003, 2007	6
Uruguay	0		3	1996, 1997, 2006	4	1998, 1999, 2002, 2007	1	2009	8
Italy	0		3	2008, 2019, 2024	1	1996	4	1995, 2004, 2015, 2017	8
Spain	0		3	2003, 2004, 2013	1	2000	1	2008	5
Tahiti	0		2	2015, 2017	0		1	2013*	3
United States	0		1	1995	1	1997	1	1996	3
Switzerland	0		1	2009	1	2021	0		2
Japan	0		1	2021	0		3	2000, 2005, 2019	4
Peru	0		1	2000	0		2	1998, 1999	3
Belarus	0		1	2025	0		1	2024	2
Mexico	0		1	2007	0		0		1
Iran	0		0		2	2017, 2024	0		2
Argentina	0		0		1	2001	1	1997	2
England	0		0		1	1995	0		1
Senegal	0		0		0		2	2021, 2025	2
El Salvador	0		0		0		1	2011	1
Thailand	0		0		0		1	2002	1

* = Hosts

=== Success by region ===
Region	Titles	Runners-up	Third place	Fourth place	Total
South America (CONMEBOL)	16	5	7	5	33
Europe (UEFA)	7	13	13	9	42
North America (CONCACAF)	0	2	1	2	5
Oceania (OFC)	0	2	0	1	3
Asia (AFC)	0	1	2	4	7
Africa (CAF)	0	0	0	2	2

=== Appearances and performance ===
The following lists the teams who have appeared in at least one tournament, in order from the most appearances down to the least, and that nation's best performance.

As of the 2021 edition, 47 countries have participated over the 21 tournaments. However, only one country has participated in all the events which is Brazil. European teams have dominated in appearances by continent, since 15 of the 47 countries have been from Europe, double than that of any other.

Only eight countries who appeared in an edition of the World Championships have failed to reappear in a FIFA World Cup. Peru (5) have appeared in the most events without any one of those being under FIFA's control. Senegal (8) have appeared in the most FIFA tournaments without having ever once appeared in the World Championships.

As of 2021 FIFA Beach Soccer World Cup

Apps	Country	First	Last	Best result
21	Brazil	1995	2021	Champions
18	Italy	1995	2019	Runners-up
18	Portugal	1997	2021	Champions
17	Uruguay	1995	2021	Runners-up
16	Argentina	1995	2015	Third place
15	USA	1995	2021	Runners-up
15	Japan	1997	2021	Runners-up
15	Spain	1998	2021	Runners-up
12	France	1997	2008	Champions
9	Russia	1996	2021	Champions
8	Senegal	2007	2021	Fourth place
8	UAE	2007	2023	Round 1
7	Switzerland	2004	2021	Runners-up
7	Iran	2006	2017	Third place
6	Nigeria	2006	2019	QF
6	Mexico	2007	2019	Runners-up
6	Tahiti	2011	2021	Runners-up
5	Peru	1998	2004	Runners-up
5	Solomon Isl.	2006	2013	Round 1
5	El Salvador	2008	2021	Fourth place
5	Paraguay	2013	2021	QF
4	Germany	1995	2004	Round 1
4	Oman	2011	2021	Round 1
3	Canada	1996	2006	QF
3	Venezuela	2000	2011	QF
3	Ukraine	2005	2013	QF

Apps	Country	First	Last	Best result
2	Netherlands	1995	2013	Round 1
2	South Africa	1999	2005	Round 1
2	Thailand	2002	2005	Fourth place
2	Poland	2006	2017	Round 1
2	Bahrain	2006	2009	QF
2	Cameroon	2006	2008	Round 1
2	Costa Rica	2009	2015	Round 1
2	Ivory Coast	2009	2013	Round 1
2	Belarus	2019	2021	Round 1
1	England	1995		Third place
1	Denmark	1996		Round 1
1	Chile	1998		Round 1
1	Malaysia	1999		Round 1
1	Turkey	2001		Round 1
1	Belgium	2004		Round 1
1	Australia	2005		Round 1
1	Madagascar	2015		Round 1
1	Bahamas	2017		Round 1
1	Ecuador	2017		Round 1
1	Panama	2017		Round 1
1	Mozambique	2021		Round 1
1	Colombia	2024		Round 1
1	Egypt	2024		Round 1
1	Seychelles	2025		TBD
1	Mauritania	2025		TBD

Key:

Italics – edition of the World Championships
Apps – Appearances

QF – Quarter-finals

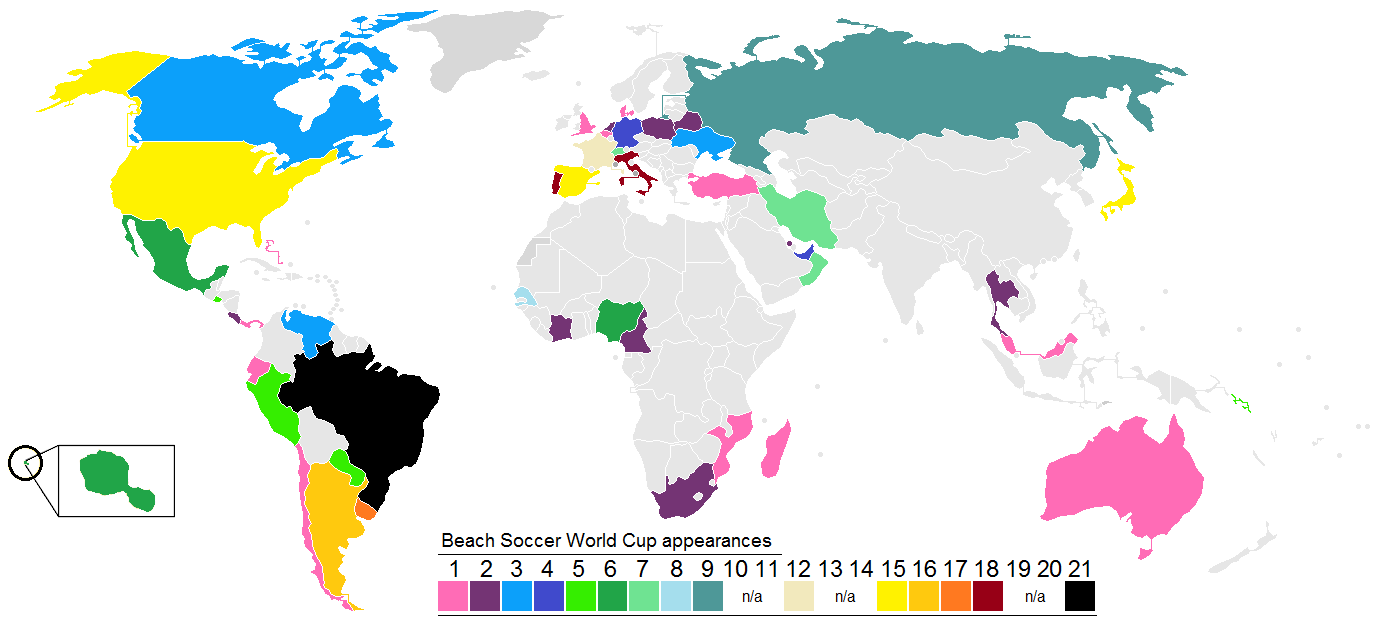
Map of the nations that have appeared in any world cup in beach soccer by appearance.

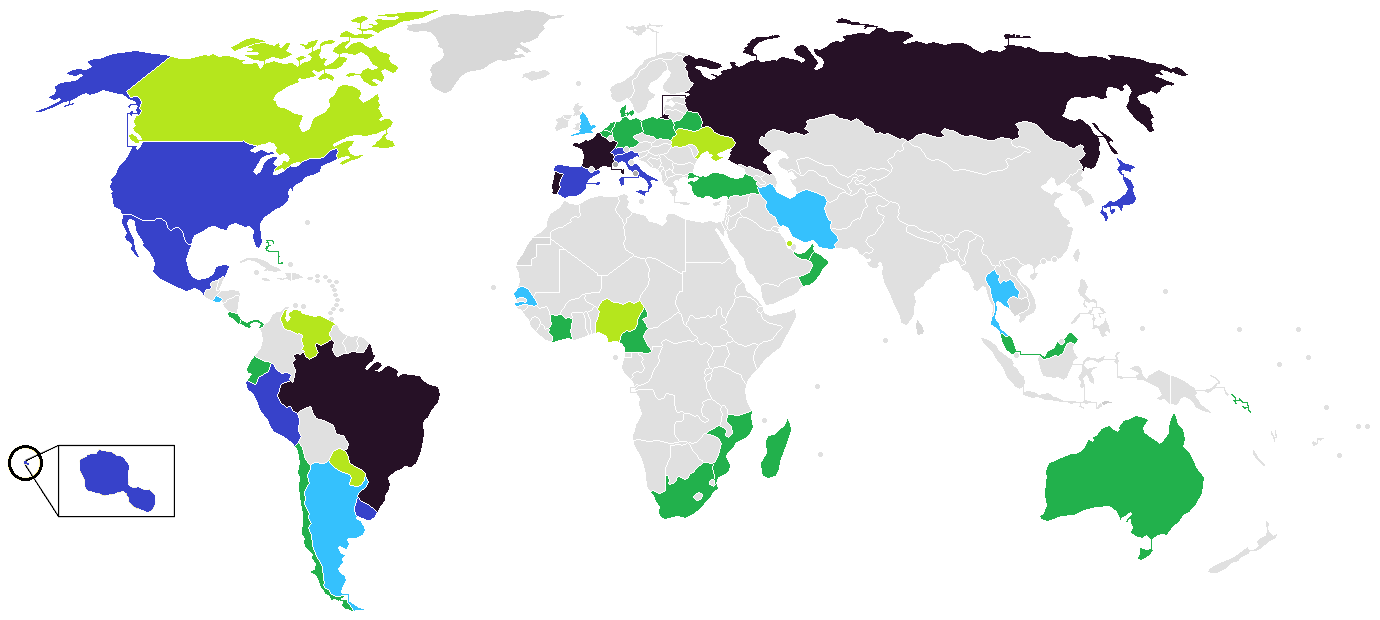
Map of the best results by nation in world cups of beach soccer. Champions Runners-up Semi-finals Quarter-finals Round 1

== Notes ==
1. At the 2021 edition, in accordance with a ban by the World Anti-Doping Agency (WADA) and a decision by the Court of Arbitration for Sport (CAS), the team from Russia was not permitted to use the Russian name, flag, or anthem; it participated in the World Cup as "the team of the Russian Football Union (RFU)", and used the flag of the Russian Olympic Committee. For the purpose of continuity in this article, the results of the RFU team in 2021 are considered as de facto results of the Russian national team.
