= 2002 Beach Soccer World Championships =

VIII Beach Soccer World Championships 2002

Tournament details
- Host country: Brazil
- Dates: 13–20 January
- Teams: 8 (from 3 confederations)
- Venues: 2 (in 2 host cities)

Final positions
- Champions: Brazil (7th title)
- Runners-up: Portugal
- Third place: Uruguay
- Fourth place: Thailand

Tournament statistics
- Matches played: 16
- Goals scored: 145 (9.06 per match)
- Top scorer(s): (Brazil) Neném (Portugal) Madjer (Uruguay) Nico (9 goals)
- Best player: (Brazil) Neném
- Best goalkeeper: (Thailand) Vilarb Nomcharoen

The 2002 Beach Soccer World Championships was the eighth edition of the Beach Soccer World Championships, the most prestigious competition in international beach soccer contested by men's national teams until 2005, when the competition was then replaced by the second iteration of a world cup in beach soccer, the better known FIFA Beach Soccer World Cup. It was organised by Brazilian sports agency Koch Tavares (one of the founding partners of Beach Soccer Worldwide).

The tournament continued to change its location, this time being staged for the first time at two venues, in Vitória, (Espírito Santo) and primarily Guarujá, (São Paulo), Brazil. In addition, the number of participating teams was reduced back to eight, as it was during the first three editions.

Brazil narrowly beat defending champions Portugal 6–5 in the final to reclaim the title, winning their seventh crown in eight attempts.

== Organisation ==
The format reverted to how the competition was organised during its founding years of 1995 to 1997. After three years as a twelve team tournament, the number of participants was reduced back to eight as it were originally, competing in two groups of four teams in a round robin format. The top two teams progressed straight to the semi-finals from which point on the championship was played as a knock-out tournament until a winner was crowned with an additional match to determine third place.

The schedule was announced in December 2001. Despite the tournament being held in two locations, in reality only one match, the opening fixture between Brazil and Thailand, was staged in Vitória whilst the other fifteen were held in Guarujá.

Rede Globo broadcast the games on television in Brazil.

== Teams ==
=== Qualification ===
European teams gained qualification by finishing in the top three spots of the 2001 Euro Beach Soccer League (EBSL). The winners, runners up and third placed nations in the previous World Championships also gained automatic qualification for their performances a year earlier; reigning champions Portugal had already gained their spot through being runners-up in the EBSL, however runners-up of last years World Cup France, who did not finish in the top three of the ESBL, and third placed Argentina, gained their spots this way.

The other entries received invites.

=== Entrants ===
Africa, North America and Oceania were unrepresented.

Asian Zone (1):

- Thailand^{1,Inv.}

European Zone (4):

- Portugal
- Spain
- France
- Italy

South American Zone (2):

- Argentina
- Uruguay^{Inv.}

Hosts:

- Brazil (South America)

Notes:

1. Teams making their debut
Inv. Invitees.

== Group stage ==
Matches are listed as local time in Vitória and Guarujá, (BRST / UTC-2)

=== Group A ===
Pos	Team	Pld	W	W+	L	GF	GA	GD	Pts	Qualification
1	Brazil	3	3	0	0	17	4	+13	9	Advance to knockout stage
2	Thailand	3	1	1	1	8	13	–5	5	Advance to knockout stage
3	Spain	3	1	0	2	11	9	+2	3	
4	France	3	0	0	3	9	19	–10	0	

January 13, 2002
10:00

Brazil	6–0	Thailand
Junior Negão; Benjamin; Neném	Report

Camburi beach, Vitória

January 15, 2002
18:00

Spain	7–2	France
Salinas; David; Amarelle; Nico	Report	Marquet; Bonora

Enseada beach, Guarujá

January 16, 2002
17:00

Thailand	5–4	France
Khongkeaw; Polsak; Lungkaew	Report	Cantona; Bonora; Germain

Enseada beach, Guarujá
January 16, 2002
19:00

Brazil	4–1	Spain
Jorginho; Benjamin; Neném; Duda	Report	Amarelle

Enseada beach, Guarujá

January 17, 2002
17:00

Thailand	3–3 (a.e.t.)	Spain
Lungkaew; Phungphook	Report	Amarelle; Nico; David
Penalties
Polsak (penalty scored)	1–0	(penalty missed) Amarelle

Enseada beach, Guarujá
January 17, 2002
19:00

Brazil	7–3	France
Benjamim; Jorginho; Júnior Negão; Neném; Juninho	Report	Samoun; Squaglia

Enseada beach, Guarujá

=== Group B ===
Pos	Team	Pld	W	W+	L	GF	GA	GD	Pts	Qualification
1	Portugal	3	3	0	0	20	11	+9	9	Advance to knockout stage
2	Uruguay	3	2	0	1	18	10	+8	6	Advance to knockout stage
3	Italy	3	1	0	2	14	16	–2	3	
4	Argentina	3	0	0	3	12	27	–15	0	

January 15, 2002
17:00

Italy	8–6	Argentina
Albore; Solda; Aquilante; Gentile; Pecchia	Report	Hilaire; Borghi; Godoy

Enseada beach, Guarujá
January 15, 2002
19:00

Portugal	6–3	Uruguay
Madjer; Zé Miguel; Alan; Pedro Jorge	Report	Nico; Leandro; Topo

Enseada beach, Guarujá

January 16, 2002
18:00

Portugal	6–4	Italy
Madjer; Hernâni; Barraca; Alan; Marinho	Report	Gentile; Albore

Enseada beach, Guarujá
January 16, 2002
20:00

Uruguay	11–2	Argentina
Pico; Nico; Miguel; Topo; Chalo; German; Fabian	Report	Borghi (pen.) Godoy

Enseada beach, Guarujá

January 17, 2002
18:00

Portugal	8–4	Argentina
Alan; Madjer; Hernâni; Barraca; Nunes	Report	Borghi; Hilaire

Enseada beach, Guarujá
January 17, 2002
20:00

Uruguay	4–2	Italy
Nico; Gato	Report	Albore; Bruschini

Enseada beach, Guarujá

== Knockout stage ==
January 18 was allocated as a rest day.

Semi-finals
19 January
Brazil	8
Uruguay	4
19 January
Thailand	2
Portugal	3

Final
20 January
Brazil	6
Portugal	5
Third place play-off
20 January
Uruguay	5
Thailand	3

=== Semi-finals ===
January 19, 2002
09:00

Portugal	3–2	Thailand
Alan; Hernâni; Madjer	Report	(pen.) Polsak; Polasak

Enseada beach, Guarujá

January 19, 2002
10:00

Brazil	8–4	Uruguay
Neném; Buru; Juninho; Wellington; Junior Negão	Report	Topo (pen.) Nico; Pico; Miguel

Enseada beach, Guarujá

=== Third place play-off ===
January 20, 2002
08:30

Uruguay	5–3	Thailand
Miguel; Nico; Gato	Report	Lungkaew; Munjaren; Khongkeaw

Enseada beach, Guarujá

=== Final ===
January 20, 2002
10:00

Brazil	6–5	Portugal
Jorginho; Junior Negão; Juninho; Neném	Report	Alan; Madjer; Barraca

Enseada beach, Guarujá

== Winners ==
2002 Beach Soccer World Championships
champions

Brazil
Seventh title

== Awards ==
Top scorer(s)
(Brazil) Neném	(Portugal) Madjer	(Uruguay) Nico
9 goals
Best player
(Brazil) Neném
Best goalkeeper
(Thailand) Vilard Normcharoen

== Top goalscorers ==
9 goals

- (Brazil) Neném
- (Portugal) Madjer
- (Uruguay) Nico

8 goals

- (Portugal) Alan

7 goals

- (Argentina) Borghi

5 goals

- (Brazil) Junior Negão
- (Brazil) Benjamin
- (Spain) Amarelle
- (Brazil) Juninho
- (Uruguay) Miguel

4 goals

- (Thailand) Lungkaew
- (Brazil) Jorginho
- (Italy) Albore
- (Italy) Gentile

3 goals

- (Spain) David
- (Thailand) Polsak
- (Italy) Aquilante
- (Argentina) Hilaire
- (Uruguay) Topo
- (Portugal) Hernâni
- (Portugal) Barraca
- (Uruguay) Pico
- (Thailand) Khongkeaw

2 goals

- (Spain) Nico
- (France) Bonora
- (France) Eric Cantona
- (France) Samoun
- (Argentina) Godoy
- (Portugal) Zé Miguel
- (Uruguay) Gato
- (Uruguay) German

19 others scored 1 goal each

== Final standings ==
Pos	Grp	Team	Pld	W	W+	L	GF	GA	GD	Pts	Final result
1	A	Brazil	5	5	0	0	31	13	+18	15	Champions
2	B	Portugal	5	4	0	1	28	19	+9	12	Runners-up
3	B	Uruguay	5	3	0	2	27	21	+6	9	Third place
4	A	Thailand	5	1	1	3	13	21	−8	5	Fourth place
5	A	Spain	3	1	0	2	11	9	+2	3	Eliminated in the group stage
6	B	Italy	3	1	0	2	14	16	−2	3	Eliminated in the group stage
7	B	France	3	0	0	3	9	19	−10	0	Eliminated in the group stage
8	A	Argentina	3	0	0	3	12	27	−15	0	Eliminated in the group stage

== Sources ==
- RSSSF
- Roonba
