= Beach Soccer World Championships =

Defunct beach soccer tournament for national teams

- Organiser(s): BSWW
- Founded: 1995
- Abolished: 2004
- Region: International
- Teams: 12
- Last champions: Brazil (9th title)
- Most championships: Brazil (9 titles)

The Beach Soccer World Championships was the premier international beach soccer competition contested by men's national teams between 1995 and 2004. It was replaced by the FIFA Beach Soccer World Cup.

The tournament took place annually in Brazil under the supervision of Beach Soccer Worldwide (BSWW) and its predecessors, crowning the world champions of the sport. Due to the sport's rapid growth, FIFA took an interest in it, and as the main tournament in world beach soccer, it joined hands with BSWW in 2005 to take over the organization of the competition, re-branding it as an official FIFA tournament.

Brazil were the most successful team, winning nine of the ten tournaments.

== History ==
The first Beach Soccer World Championship was held in Brazil, in 1995, organised by the precursors to the modern-day founders of the standardised rules, Beach Soccer Worldwide, held under the title Beach Soccer World Championship. Eight teams were selected to take part, without going through a qualification process. However Brazil, the hosts, dominated and easily won the cup without losing a game. The tournament was successful and BSWW announced that the competition would take place every year.

By 1997, more teams had already stated their interest in participating and therefore BSWW extended their selection to 10 teams for 1998. Brazil continued to dominate, despite this change. Immediately, BSWW extended to 12 teams for 1999, spreading their selection across five continents, introducing more new teams to the tournament. However, with all these changes it still took until the 2001 World Cup for Brazil to lose the title after winning the competition six years on the run since the establishment. It was Portugal who won the tournament, with Brazil finishing in a disappointing fourth place.

With this change of champions, more countries thought there was a chance for themselves to win the tournament and this sparked more interest worldwide. Not surprisingly, Brazil reclaimed their title in 2002, when BSWW reduced the number of contestants back to eight. The last Beach Soccer World Championship to be organised purely by BSWW was in 2004 when twelve teams played, before being replaced by the FIFA Beach Soccer World Cup the next year.

== Results ==
#	Year	Location(s)	Final			Third place play-off			No. of teams	Goals (match avg.)
#	Year	Location(s)	Champions	Score	Runners-up	Third place	Score	Fourth place	No. of teams	Goals (match avg.)
1	1995; Details	(Brazil) / Copacabana Beach, Rio de Janeiro, Brazil	Brazil	8–1	United States	England	7–6	Italy	8	149 (9.3)
2	1996; Details	(Brazil) / Copacabana Beach, Rio de Janeiro, Brazil	Brazil	3–0	Uruguay	Italy	4–3	United States	8	131 (8.2)
3	1997; Details	(Brazil) / Copacabana Beach, Rio de Janeiro, Brazil	Brazil	5–2	Uruguay	United States	5–1	Argentina	8	144 (9.0)
4	1998; Details	(Brazil) / Copacabana Beach, Rio de Janeiro, Brazil	Brazil	9–2	France	Uruguay	6–3	Peru	10	218 (9.1)
5	1999; Details	(Brazil) / Copacabana Beach, Rio de Janeiro, Brazil	Brazil	5–2	Portugal	Uruguay	2–2 (a.e.t.) (5–4 p.)	Peru	12	174 (8.7)
6	2000; Details	(Brazil) / Marina da Glória, Rio de Janeiro, Brazil	Brazil	6–2	Peru	Spain	6–3	Japan	12	172 (8.6)
7	2001; Details	(Brazil) / Costa do Sauípe, Mata de São João, Brazil	Portugal	9–3	France	Argentina	4–2	Brazil	12	144 (7.2)
8	2002; Details	(Brazil) / Vitória, Espírito Santo, Brazil; (Brazil) / Guarujá, São Paulo, Brazil	Brazil	6–5	Portugal	Uruguay	5–3	Thailand	8	145 (9.1)
9	2003; Details	(Brazil) / Copacabana Beach, Rio de Janeiro, Brazil	Brazil	8–2	Spain	Portugal	7–4	France	8	150 (9.4)
10	2004; Details	(Brazil) / Copacabana Beach, Rio de Janeiro, Brazil	Brazil	6–4	Spain	Portugal	5–1	Italy	12	155 (7.8)

=== Teams reaching the top four ===
Overall, half of the 24 nations who ever competed made a top four finish; only two won the title. Brazil were by far the most successful nation, winning nine titles of the possible ten. Portugal claimed the only crown Brazil did not win.

Brazil were also the only nation to finish in the final four of every championship.

Nation	Titles	Runners-up	Third place	Fourth place	Total top 4
Brazil	9 (1995, 1996, 1997, 1998, 1999, 2000, 2002, 2003, 2004)	—	—	1 (2001)	10
Portugal	1 (2001)	2 (1999, 2002)	2 (2003, 2004)	—	5
Uruguay	—	2 (1996, 1997)	3 (1998, 1999, 2002)	—	5
Spain	—	2 (2003, 2004)	1 (2000)	—	3
France	—	2 (1998, 2001)	—	1 (2003)	3
United States	—	1 (1995)	1 (1997)	1 (1996)	3
Peru	—	1 (2000)	—	2 (1998, 1999)	3
Italy	—	—	1 (1996)	2 (1995, 2004)	3
Argentina	—	—	1 (2001)	1 (1997)	2
England	—	—	1 (1995)	—	1
Japan	—	—	—	1 (2000)	1
Thailand	—	—	—	1 (2002)	1

Note: Brazil hosted all tournaments.

=== By confederation ===
Total times teams played by confederation
	Asia	Africa	North America	South America	Oceania	Europe	Total
Teams	6	1	11	36	0	44	98
Top 8	5	0	10	30	0	35	80
Top 4	2	0	3	20	0	15	40
Top 2	0	0	1	12	0	7	20
1st	0	0	0	9	0	1	10
2nd	0	0	1	3	0	6	10
3rd	0	0	1	4	0	5	10
4th	2	0	1	4	0	3	10

== Tournament appearances ==
24 countries participated over the ten competitions, however nearly half (11) only appeared at one edition. Three participated in all World Championships: Brazil, Italy and Uruguay. European teams dominated in unique appearances by continent, since half of all countries were from Europe. Oceania were the only region never to be represented at least once.

Only eight of the 24 countries have failed to reappear at a FIFA controlled World Cup. Peru (5) appeared in the most competitions without yet participating in a FIFA World Cup.

Apps.	Country	First	Last	Best result
10	Brazil	1995	2004	Champions
10	Italy	1995	2004	Third place
10	Uruguay	1995	2004	Runners-up
9	United States	1995	2004	Runners-up
8	Argentina	1995	2004	Third place
8	France	1997	2004	Runners-up
8	Portugal	1997	2004	Champions
7	Spain	1998	2004	Runners-up
5	Peru	1998	2004	Runners-up
4	Germany	1995	2004	Round 1
4	Japan	1997	2003	Fourth place
2	Canada	1996	1999	QFs
2	Venezuela	2000	2001	QFs
1	England	1995		Third place
1	Netherlands	1995		Round 1
1	Denmark	1996		Round 1
1	Russia	1996		Round 1
1	Chile	1998		Round 1
1	Malaysia	1999		Round 1
1	South Africa	1999		Round 1
1	Turkey	2001		Round 1
1	Thailand	2002		Fourth place
1	Belgium	2004		Round 1
1	Switzerland	2004		QFs

== Overall team records ==
In this ranking 3 points are awarded for a win in normal time, 2 points for a win in extra time or penalty shoot-out and 0 for a loss. Teams are ranked by total points, then by goal difference, then by goals scored. Only the points for the first 10 World Championships that occurred between 1995 and 2004 are counted here.

Rank	Team	Part	Pld	W	W+	L	GF	GA	GD	Pts
1	Brazil	10	50	48	0	2	422	123	+299	144
2	Portugal	8	35	23	1	11	177	119	+58	71
3	Uruguay	10	39	16	4	19	155	155	0	56
4	United States	9	33	15	0	18	112	138	−26	45
5	Spain	7	27	14	1	12	109	108	+1	44
6	Italy	10	36	12	1	23	128	183	−55	38
7	France	8	29	11	1	17	115	154	−39	35
8	Peru	5	21	11	0	10	81	78	+3	33
9	Argentina	8	30	10	0	20	82	122	−40	30
10	Japan	4	14	3	1	10	40	78	−38	11
11	England	1	5	2	0	3	20	31	−11	6
12	Canada	2	6	2	0	4	22	37	−15	6
13	Thailand	1	5	1	1	3	13	21	−8	5
14	Venezuela	2	5	1	0	4	14	16	−2	3
15	Russia	1	3	1	0	2	7	10	−3	3
16	Denmark	1	3	1	0	2	10	16	−6	3
17	Chile	1	4	1	0	3	14	22	−8	3
18	Switzerland	1	3	1	0	2	9	17	−8	3
19	Germany	4	9	1	0	8	22	56	−34	3
20	Turkey	1	2	0	0	2	1	5	−4	0
21	Malaysia	1	2	0	0	2	4	13	−9	0
22	South Africa	1	2	0	0	2	2	14	−12	0
23	Belgium	1	2	0	0	2	5	18	−13	0
24	Netherlands	1	3	0	0	3	7	30	−23	0

== Awards ==
The following documents the winners of the awards presented at the conclusion of the tournament. Three awards were consistently bestowed at each event.

Year	Top goalscorer(s)	Gls	Best player(s)	Best goalkeeper	Ref.
1995	(Italy) Alessandro Altobelli (Brazil) Zico	12	(Brazil) Júnior (Brazil) Zico	(Brazil) Paulo Sérgio	
1996	(Italy) Alessandro Altobelli	14	(Brazil) Edinho	(Brazil) Paulo Sérgio	
1997	(Brazil) Júnior (Uruguay) Venancio Ramos	11	(Brazil) Júnior	(Brazil) Paulo Sérgio	
1998	(Brazil) Júnior	14	(Brazil) Júnior	(Brazil) Paulo Sérgio	
1999	(Brazil) Júnior (Uruguay) Gustavo Matosas	10	(Brazil) Jorginho	(Portugal) Pedro Crespo	
2000	(Brazil) Júnior	13	(Brazil) Júnior	(Japan) Eichi Kato	
2001	(Portugal) Alan	10	(Portugal) Hernâni	(France) Pascal Olmeta	
2002	(Portugal) Madjer (Brazil) Neném (Uruguay) Nico	9	(Brazil) Neném	(Thailand) Vilard Normcharoen	
2003	(Brazil) Neném	15	(Spain) Amarelle	(Brazil) Robertinho	
2004	(Portugal) Madjer	12	(Brazil) Jorginho	(Spain) Roberto Valeiro	

== Top goalscorers ==
From the data available,^{[Note]} the below table shows the top 20 goalscorers of the World Championships.

Rank	Player	Team	Goals
1	Júnior	Brazil	71
2	Neném	Brazil	55
3	Júnior Negão	Brazil	54
4	Madjer	Portugal	52
5	Jorginho	Brazil	43
6	Alan	Portugal	37
7	Venancio Ramos	Uruguay	34
8	Amarelle	Spain	32
9	Alessandro Altobelli	Italy	30
9	Benjamin	Brazil	30
11	Cláudio Adão	Brazil	28
12	Edinho	Brazil	25
12	Juninho	Brazil	25
14	Zico	Brazil	23
15	Hernâni	Portugal	22
15	Magal	Brazil	22
17	Gabriel Silvera	Uruguay	20
18	Gustavo Matosas	Uruguay	18
19	Zak Ibsen	United States	17
19	Nico	Uruguay	17
19	Jorge Olaechea	Peru	17
19	Carlos Russo	Argentina	17

1995–2001 (combined scorers), 2003, 2004, 2005, 2006, 2007, 2008, 2009, 2011, 2013, 2015, 2017, 2019

Notes:
- Note that the sources from 1995–2002 only list the players with the most goals from all those tournaments combined; players must have scored at least 10 goals overall to make the list; players with less goals are not listed. This means for players who subsequently scored enough goals to make the above all-time table, if they played between 1995–2002 and scored less than 10 goals, they would not have made the source lists and therefore any goals they did score during that time are a) unknown and b) missing from the above table (if they did score any).
- Note that there are some discrepancies between FIFA's match reports and FIFA's top scorers lists for the same tournament.
- During the early years of beach soccer, goals scored in a penalty shootout were often combined with goals scored during regulation time when the match score was documented – note that it is also possible such goals may have been counted in a player's goal tally in the sources.

== Attendance figures ==
Note that attendance records are not available between 1995 and 2002.

Year	Location	Stadium capacity	Matches	Total gate	Lowest gate	Highest gate	Average gate	Attendance %^{†}
2003	Rio de Janeiro, Brazil	6,000	16	74,700	2,000	6,000	4,669	78%
2004	Rio de Janeiro, Brazil	10,000	20	81,900	500	10,000	4,095	41%

Key:
- † – overall percentage matches were attended from the total possible maximum attendance figure if all matches were at full capacity: total gate / (stadium capacity x matches played)
