= 2000 Beach Soccer World Championships =

VI Beach Soccer World Championships 2000

Tournament details
- Host country: Brazil
- Dates: 13–20 February
- Teams: 12 (from 4 confederations)
- Venue: 1 (in 1 host city)

Final positions
- Champions: Brazil (6th title)
- Runners-up: Peru
- Third place: Spain
- Fourth place: Japan

Tournament statistics
- Matches played: 20
- Goals scored: 172 (8.6 per match)
- Top scorer: (Brazil) Júnior (13 goals)
- Best player: (Brazil) Júnior
- Best goalkeeper: (Japan) Eichi Kato

The 2000 Beach Soccer World Championships was the sixth edition of the Beach Soccer World Championships, the most prestigious competition in international beach soccer contested by men's national teams until 2005, when the competition was then replaced by the second iteration of a world cup in beach soccer, the better known FIFA Beach Soccer World Cup. It was organised by Brazilian sports agency Koch Tavares (one of the founding partners of Beach Soccer Worldwide).

The tournament continued to take place in Rio de Janeiro, however for the first time the venue moved away from the sport's birthplace of Copacabana Beach, being staged around ten miles north at the Marina da Glória.

Defending champions Brazil won their sixth consecutive title, after defeating first time finalists Peru 6–2 in the concluding match of the tournament. Spain and Japan both finished inside the top four for the first time, the latter becoming the first Asian nation to do so at a World Championships.

== Organisation ==
With the increase in the number of participating number teams in the previous year, the organisation remained the same at this World Championships, continuing with twelve nations who were split into four groups of three playing each other in a round robin format. The top two teams progressed to the quarter-finals from which point on the championship was played as a knock-out tournament until a winner was crowned, with an additional match to determine third place.

== Teams ==
The top finishing European nations in the 1999 Euro Beach Soccer League achieved qualification, along with the top finishers from South America in the 1999/2000 Americas' League. The other nations received invites.

Africa and Oceania were unrepresented.

Asian Zone (1):

- Japan

European Zone (5):

- Spain
- Portugal
- Italy
- France
- Germany

North American Zone (1):

- United States

South American Zone (4):

- Peru
- Venezuela^{1}
- Uruguay
- Argentina

Hosts:

- Brazil (South America)

Notes:

1. Teams making their debut

== Group stage ==
Matches are listed as local time in Rio de Janeiro, (BRST / UTC-2)

=== Group A ===
Pos	Team	Pld	W	W+	L	GF	GA	GD	Pts	Qualification
1	Brazil	2	2	0	0	22	7	+15	6	Advance to knockout stage
2	Italy	2	1	0	1	9	14	–5	3	Advance to knockout stage
3	Germany	2	0	0	2	7	17	–10	0	

February 13, 2000

Brazil	10–4	Italy

Marina da Glória

February 15, 2000

Brazil	12–3	Germany

Marina da Glória

February 16, 2000

Italy	5–4	Germany

Marina da Glória

=== Group B ===
Pos	Team	Pld	W	W+	L	GF	GA	GD	Pts	Qualification
1	Japan	2	1	1	0	7	6	+1	5	Advance to knockout stage
2	Portugal	2	1	0	1	8	6	+2	3	Advance to knockout stage
3	Argentina	2	0	0	2	6	9	–3	0	

February 13, 2000

Portugal	5–3	Argentina

Marina da Glória

February 15, 2000

Japan	3–3 (a.e.t.)	Portugal
Penalties
	2–1

Marina da Glória

February 16, 2000

Japan	4–3	Argentina

Marina da Glória

=== Group C ===
Pos	Team	Pld	W	W+	L	GF	GA	GD	Pts	Qualification
1	Peru	2	2	0	0	8	2	+6	6	Advance to knockout stage
2	Venezuela	2	1	0	1	4	1	+3	3	Advance to knockout stage
3	France	2	0	0	2	2	11	–9	0	

February 14, 2000

Peru	1–0	Venezuela

Marina da Glória

February 15, 2000

Venezuela	4–0	France

Marina da Glória

February 16, 2000

Peru	7–2	France

Marina da Glória

=== Group D ===
Pos	Team	Pld	W	W+	L	GF	GA	GD	Pts	Qualification
1	Spain	2	1	0	1	8	8	0	3	Advance to knockout stage
2	United States	2	1	0	1	10	9	+1	3	Advance to knockout stage
3	Uruguay	2	0	1	1	8	9	–1	2	

February 14, 2000

United States	6–4	Uruguay

Marina da Glória

February 15, 2000

Spain	5–4	United States

Marina da Glória

February 16, 2000

Uruguay	4–3 (a.e.t.)	Spain

Marina da Glória

== Knockout stage ==
February 18 was allocated as a rest day.

Quarter finals
17 February
Japan	6
Italy	5
17 February
Peru	8
United States	4
17 February
Brazil	6
Portugal	3
17 February
Spain (a.e.t.)	4
Venezuela	3

Semi-finals
19 February
Japan	0
Peru	5
19 February
Brazil	8
Spain	4

Final
20 February
Peru	2
Brazil	6
Third place play-off
20 February
Japan	3
Spain	6

=== Quarter finals ===
February 17, 2000

Japan	6–5	Italy

Marina da Glória

February 17, 2000

Spain	4–3 (a.e.t.)	Venezuela

Marina da Glória

February 17, 2000

Peru	8–4	United States

Marina da Glória

February 17, 2000

Brazil	6–3	Portugal

Marina da Glória

=== Semi-finals ===
February 19, 2000

Brazil	8–4	Spain
Jorginho; Magal; Júnior; Neném; Junior Negão	Report	Joaquin; Goichoetcea; Amarelle

Marina da Glória

February 19, 2000

Peru	5–0	Japan
Fernando; Maruy; Olaechea; Drago	Report

Marina da Glória

=== Third place play-off ===
February 20, 2000
09:00

Spain	6–3	Japan
Amarelle; Sétien; Jimenez; Goichoetcea	Report	Naoya; Yoshii ?

Marina da Glória

=== Final ===
February 20, 2000
10:15

Brazil	6–2	Peru
Neném; Júnior; Junior Negão; Jorginho	Report	Valdelomar; Drago

Marina da Glória
Attendance: 8,000
Referee: Carlos Mastrangelo (Argentina)

== Winners ==
2000 Beach Soccer World Championships
champions

Brazil
Sixth title

== Awards ==
Top scorer
(Brazil) Júnior
13 goals
Best player
(Brazil) Júnior
Best goalkeeper
(Japan) Eichi Kato

== Final standings ==
Pos	Grp	Team	Pld	W	W+	L	GF	GA	GD	Pts	Final result
1	A	Brazil	5	5	0	0	42	16	+26	15	Champions
2	B	Peru	5	4	0	1	23	12	+11	12	Runners-up
3	D	Spain	5	2	1	2	22	22	0	8	Third place
4	B	Japan	5	2	1	2	16	22	−6	8	Fourth place
5	C	Venezuela	3	1	0	2	7	5	+2	3	Eliminated in the quarter finals
6	B	Portugal	3	1	0	2	11	12	−1	3	Eliminated in the quarter finals
7	D	United States	3	1	0	2	14	17	−3	3	Eliminated in the quarter finals
8	A	Italy	3	1	0	2	14	20	−6	3	Eliminated in the quarter finals
9	D	Uruguay	2	0	1	1	8	9	−1	2	Eliminated in the group stage
10	C	Argentina	2	0	0	2	6	9	−3	0	Eliminated in the group stage
11	C	France	2	0	0	2	2	11	−9	0	Eliminated in the group stage
12	A	Germany	2	0	0	2	7	17	−10	0	Eliminated in the group stage

== Sources ==
- RSSSF
- Roonba
