= Capivari de Baixo =

Brazilian municipality

Capivari de Baixo, Santa Catarina
- Flag Coat of arms

- Location in Santa Catarina, Brazil

- Location within Brazil
- Coordinates: 28°28′00″S 49°00′25″W
- Country: Brazil
- Region: South
- State: (Santa Catarina (state)) Santa Catarina
- City Emancipation: March 30, 1992

Government
  - Mayor: Nivaldo Souza (Partido Socialista Brasileiro)

Area
  - Total: 53.165 km^{2} (20.527 sq mi)
- Elevation: 100 m (330 ft)

Population (2020)
  - Total: 25,177
- Time zone: UTC-03:00 (BRT)
  - Summer (DST): UTC-02:00 (BRST)
- Website: www.capivaridebaixo.sc.gov.br

Capivari de Baixo is a Brazilian municipality located in the southern region of Santa Catarina. In 2010, it had a population estimated at 21,674 inhabitants. As of 2020, the population was estimated to be at 25,177. From 1991 to 2000, the demographic growth has been of 1.51% yearly, while the national average was of 1.63%. From 2000 to 2010, the demographic growth was of 1.56% yearly, while the national average was of 1.17%. Capivari de Baixo has the largest coal-fired thermoelectric power plant of Latin America, Complexo Termoelétrico Jorge Lacerda.
