= Argentina national beach soccer team =

Argentina
- Nickname: La Albiceleste
- Association: Argentine Football Association
- Confederation: CONMEBOL (South America)
- Head coach: Gustavo Casado
- Captain: Lucas Medero
- Home stadium: Ezeiza
- FIFA code: ARG
- BSWW ranking: 18 (2 June 2025)
First colours
Second colours

World Cup
- Appearances: 9 (first in 2005)
- Best result: Quarter-finals (2006, 2008, 2013)

CONMEBOL Beach Soccer Championship
- Appearances: 8 (first in 2005)
- Best result: (gold) Winner (2013)

Beach Soccer World Championship (BSWW)
- Appearances: 8 (first in 1995)
- Best result: Third Place (2001)
- Website: www.afa.org.ar

The Argentina national beach soccer team represents Argentina in international beach soccer competitions and is controlled by the Asociación del Fútbol Argentino (AFA), the governing body for football in Argentina.

The team has qualified for and participated in eight FIFA Beach Soccer World Cup tournaments and has been a winner of the CONMEBOL competition once and runners-up twice. Argentina is ranked 10th in the FIFA world rankings.

== Current squad ==
Correct as of April 2015:

Note: Flags indicate national team as defined under FIFA eligibility rules; some limited exceptions apply. Players may hold more than one non-FIFA nationality.

No.	Pos.	Nation	Player
1	GK		Marcelo Salgueiro
2	DF		Jonathan Levi
3	DF		Santiago Hilaire
8	MF		Rodrigo Lopez
6	DF		Luciano Franceschini
10	MF		Federico Costas

No.	Pos.	Nation	Player
14	FW		Lucas Medero
7	FW		Federico Hilaire
9	FW		Luciano Sirico
11	FW		Cesar Leguizamon
4	MF		Cristian Cuevas
12	GK		Dardo Cortes

== Current staff ==
- Coach: Gustavo Casado
- Technical Assistant: Esteban Pizzi
- Head Delegation: Gustavo Lorenzo

=== FIFA Beach Soccer World Cup record ===
Year	Round	Pos	Pld	W	W aet/pso	L	GF	GA	GD
(Brazil) 2005	Quarterfinals	8th	3	1	0	2	8	16	-8
(Brazil) 2006	Quarterfinals	5th	4	3	0	1	11	9	+2
(Brazil) 2007	Group stage	11th	3	1	0	2	9	9	0
(France) 2008	Quarterfinals	5th	4	3	0	1	13	7	+6
(United Arab Emirates) 2009	Group stage	9th	3	1	1	1	11	6	+5
(Italy) 2011	Group stage	11th	3	1	0	2	6	10	-4
(French Polynesia) 2013	Quarterfinals	5th	4	2	0	2	18	17	+1
(Portugal) 2015	Group stage	13th	3	1	0	2	9	14	-5
(The Bahamas) 2017	Did not qualify								
(Paraguay) 2019	Did not qualify								
(Russia) 2021	Did not qualify								
(United Arab Emirates) 2024	Group stage	11th	3	1	0	2	11	14	-3
(Seychelles) 2025	Did not qualify								
Total	0 titles	9/13	30	14	1	16	85	89	-6

=== Beach Soccer World Championships record ===
Year	Round	Pos	Pld	W	W aet/pso	L	GF	GA	GD
(Brazil) 1995	Group stage	7th	3	1	0	2	4	6	
(Brazil) 1996	Group stage	8th	3	0	0	3	5	12	
(Brazil) 1997	Semifinalist	4th	5	2	0	3	14	33	
(Brazil) 1998	Quarterfinals	8th	4	1	0	3	13	19	
(Brazil) 1999	Not invited								
(Brazil) 2000	Group stage	10th	3	0	0	3	9	10	
(Brazil) 2001	Semifinalist	3rd	5	4	0	1	22	12	
(Brazil) 2002	Group stage	8th	3	0	0	3	12	27	
(Brazil) 2003	Not invited								
(Brazil) 2004	Quarterfinals	7th	3	1	0	2	8	15	
Total	8/10	-	30	10	0	20	84	125	-

=== Regional honours ===
- CONCACAF and CONMEBOL Beach Soccer Championship:
- 4th 2005
- 3rd 2007
- CONMEBOL Beach Soccer Championship:
- 3rd (3) 2006, 2009 and 2015
- Runners-up (2) 2008 and 2011
- Winners (1) 2013.

== Mundialito de Futebol de Praia ==
- 3rd (3) 2006, 2008, 2010

== Copa Latina ==
- 2nd (1) 2006
- 3rd (4) 1999, 2003, 2009, 2010
