= 2019 World Cup final =

2019 World Cup final may refer to:

- 2019 Cricket World Cup final
- 2019 FIFA Beach Soccer World Cup Final
- 2019 FIFA Women's World Cup Final
- 2019 Rugby World Cup final
