= Sanea Langkaew =

Thai football coach and former player (born 1974)

Personal information
- Date of birth: 19 September 1974 (age 52)
- Place of birth: Chaiyaphum, Thailand
- Position: Midfielder

Senior career*
Years	Team	Apps	(Gls)
- Royal Thai Air Force FC

International career
- Thailand
- * Club domestic league appearances and goals

Sanea Langkaew (Thai: เสน่ห์ ลังแก้ว, born 19 September 1974) is a Thai football coach and former player. Born in Chaiyaphum Province, He started playing for Royal Thai Air Force F.C., and was called up to the U-19 national team, then the national team in 1997, before regularly appearing with the Thailand national beach soccer team, placing fourth at the 2002 Beach Soccer World Championship. He played for several teams under the Thai Division 1 League, most notably Air Force and Mahasarakham City, until 2011, when he retired from playing. He has since coached for Mashare Chaiyaphum, Nong Bua Lamphu, Mahasarakham and Amnat Poly United, and now coaches secondary school football at Kanchanapisek Wittayalai Chaiyaphum School in his hometown.
