= Anupong Polasak =

Thai footballer, football coach, and beach soccer player

Personal information
- Full name: Anupong Polasak
- Date of birth: 20 May 1973 (age 53)
- Place of birth: Nong Khai, Thailand
- Position: Forward

Senior career*
Years	Team	Apps	(Gls)
- Raj Pracha FC

International career
- Thailand
- * Club domestic league appearances and goals

Anupong Polasak (Thai: อนุพงษ์ พลศักดิ์, born 20 May 1973) is a Thai former footballer and coach. He has played for the national beach soccer team, appearing at the 2002 Beach Soccer World Championship and the 2005 FIFA Beach Soccer World Cup, and for the national futsal team at the 2004 FIFA Futsal World Championship.
