= 1999 Beach Soccer World Championships =

Tournament details
- Host country: Brazil
- Dates: January 10–17
- Teams: 12 (from 5 confederations)
- Venue(s): 1 (in 1 host city)

Final positions
- Champions: Brazil (5th title)
- Runners-up: Portugal
- Third place: Uruguay
- Fourth place: Peru

Tournament statistics
- Matches played: 20
- Goals scored: 174 (8.7 per match)
- Top scorer(s): (Brazil) Júnior (Uruguay) Gustavo Matosas (10 goals)
- Best player(s): (Brazil) Jorginho
- Best goalkeeper: (Portugal) Pedro Crespo

The 1999 Beach Soccer World Championships was the fifth edition of the Beach Soccer World Championships, the most prestigious competition in international beach soccer contested by men's national teams until 2005, when the competition was then replaced by the second iteration of a world cup in beach soccer, the better known FIFA Beach Soccer World Cup. It was organised by Brazilian sports agency Koch Tavares (one of the founding partners of Beach Soccer Worldwide).

The tournament continued to take place at Copacabana Beach in Rio de Janeiro, Brazil.

Twelve teams (a record high at the time) took part for the first time, expanded for a second year running, from ten in 1998. This championship also saw an African nation participate for the first time (and only time pre-2005) making this the single pre-FIFA era world cup with the most continental representation, with all but Oceania represented by at least one nation competing in Rio.

Brazil won their fifth title in a row by beating Portugal 5–2 in what was the Iberians' first final appearance.

== Organisation ==
The number of teams competing this year was increased to twelve meaning a shift in organisation from previous years.

The twelve nations were split into four groups of three who played each other in a round robin format. The top two teams then progressed to the quarter-finals. With the increase in nations in this edition, this saw a quarter final stage introduced to the Championships for the first time. From the aforementioned round onward, the championship was played as a knock-out tournament until a winner was crowned, with an additional match to determine third place.

== Teams ==
Africa was represented for the first time (and only time before FIFA took control of the world cup). Asia had two nations competing for the first time.

Oceania was unrepresented, the only continent to be so.

African Zone (1):

- South Africa^{1}

Asian Zone (2):

- Japan
- Malaysia^{1}

European Zone (4):

- Spain
- France
- Italy
- Portugal

North American Zone (2):

- Canada
- United States

South American Zone (2):

- Peru
- Uruguay

Hosts:

- Brazil (South America)

Notes:

1. Teams making their debut

== Group stage ==
=== Group A ===
Pos	Team	Pld	W	W+	L	GF	GA	GD	Pts	Qualification
1	Brazil	2	2	0	0	25	10	+15	6	Advance to knockout stage
2	Japan	2	1	0	1	12	14	–2	3	Advance to knockout stage
3	France	2	0	0	2	9	22	–13	0	

January 10, 1999

Brazil	15–5	France

Copacabana beach

January 12, 1999

Brazil	10–5	Japan

Copacabana beach

January 13, 1999

Japan	7–4	France

Copacabana beach

=== Group B ===
Pos	Team	Pld	W	W+	L	GF	GA	GD	Pts	Qualification
1	Uruguay	2	2	0	0	15	4	+11	6	Advance to knockout stage
2	Spain	2	1	0	1	8	6	+2	3	Advance to knockout stage
3	South Africa	2	0	0	2	1	14	–13	0	

January 11, 1999

Uruguay	10–0	South Africa

Copacabana beach

January 12, 1999

Spain	4–1	South Africa

Copacabana beach

January 13, 1999

Uruguay	5–4	Spain

Copacabana beach

=== Group C ===
Pos	Team	Pld	W	W+	L	GF	GA	GD	Pts	Qualification
1	Peru	2	2	0	0	6	2	+4	6	Advance to knockout stage
2	Canada	2	1	0	1	6	6	0	3	Advance to knockout stage
3	Italy	2	0	0	2	5	9	–4	0	

January 11, 1999

Peru	2–1	Canada

Copacabana beach

January 12, 1999

Canada	5–4	Italy

Copacabana beach

January 13, 1999

Peru	4–1	Italy

Copacabana beach

=== Group D ===
Pos	Team	Pld	W	W+	L	GF	GA	GD	Pts	Qualification
1	Portugal	2	2	0	0	11	4	+7	6	Advance to knockout stage
2	United States	2	1	0	1	9	7	+2	3	Advance to knockout stage
3	Malaysia	2	0	0	2	4	13	–9	0	

January 11, 1999

United States	7–2	Malaysia

Copacabana beach

January 12, 1999

Portugal	6–2	Malaysia

Copacabana beach

January 13, 1999

United States	2–5	Portugal

Copacabana beach

== Knockout stage ==
=== Quarter finals ===
January 14, 1999

Uruguay	5–5 (a.e.t.)	United States
Penalties
	2–1

Copacabana beach

January 14, 1999

Portugal	6–1	Spain

Copacabana beach

January 14, 1999

Peru	7–3	Japan

Copacabana beach

January 14, 1999

Brazil	7–4	Canada

Copacabana beach

=== Semi-finals ===
January 16, 1999

Portugal	5–2	Peru

Copacabana beach

January 16, 1999

Brazil	5–2	Uruguay

Copacabana beach

=== Third place play-off ===
January 17, 1999

Uruguay	2–2 (a.e.t.)	Peru
Penalties
	5–4

Copacabana beach

=== Final ===
January 17, 1999

Brazil	5–2	Portugal
Magal; Jorginho; Juninho; Junior Negão	Report	Madjer; Hernâni

Copacabana beach

== Winners ==
1999 Beach Soccer World Championships
champions

Brazil
Fifth title

== Awards ==
Top scorers
(Brazil) Júnior	(Uruguay) Gustavo Matosas
10 goals
Best player
(Brazil) Jorginho
Best goalkeeper
(Portugal) Pedro Crespo

== Final standings ==
Pos	Grp	Team	Pld	W	W+	L	GF	GA	GD	Pts	Final result
1	A	Brazil	5	5	0	0	42	18	+24	15	Champions
2	D	Portugal	5	4	0	1	24	12	+12	12	Runners-up
3	B	Uruguay	5	2	2	1	24	16	+8	10	Third place
4	C	Peru	5	3	0	2	17	12	+5	9	Fourth place
5	B	Spain	3	1	0	2	9	12	−3	3	Eliminated in the quarter finals
6	D	United States	3	1	0	2	14	12	+2	3	Eliminated in the quarter finals
7	C	Canada	3	1	0	2	10	13	−3	3	Eliminated in the quarter finals
8	A	Japan	3	1	0	2	15	21	−6	3	Eliminated in the quarter finals
9	C	Italy	2	0	0	2	5	9	−4	0	Eliminated in the group stage
10	D	Malaysia	2	0	0	2	4	13	−9	0	Eliminated in the group stage
11	A	France	2	0	0	2	9	22	−13	0	Eliminated in the group stage
12	B	South Africa	2	0	0	2	1	14	−13	0	Eliminated in the group stage

== Sources ==
- RSSSF
- Roonba
