= 1997 Beach Soccer World Championships =

III Beach Soccer World Championships

Tournament details
- Host country: Brazil
- Dates: January 14–19
- Teams: 8 (from 4 confederations)
- Venue: 1 (in 1 host city)

Final positions
- Champions: Brazil (3rd title)
- Runners-up: Uruguay
- Third place: United States
- Fourth place: Argentina

Tournament statistics
- Matches played: 16
- Goals scored: 141 (8.81 per match)
- Top scorer(s): (Brazil) Júnior (Uruguay) Venancio Ramos (11 goals)
- Best player: (Brazil) Júnior
- Best goalkeeper: (Brazil) Paulo Sérgio

The 1997 Beach Soccer World Championships was the third edition of the Beach Soccer World Championships, the most prestigious competition in international beach soccer contested by men's national teams until 2005, when the competition was then replaced by the second iteration of a world cup in beach soccer, the better known FIFA Beach Soccer World Cup. It was organised by Brazilian sports agency Koch Tavares (one of the founding partners of Beach Soccer Worldwide).

For the third consecutive time, the tournament took place at Copacabana Beach in Rio de Janeiro, Brazil.

Hosts Brazil won the tournament for the third time in a row by beating Uruguay 5–2 in what was a repeat of the final in the previous edition. It was also the first and only time in the history of the world cup that no European nations finished in the top four.

Future champions France and Portugal both competed for the first time at this edition, as did the first Asian nation, Japan.

== Organisation ==
The organisation remained the same as the format established during the championship's inception in 1995; the eight participating nations competed in two groups of four teams in a round robin format. The top two teams progressed straight to the semi-finals from which point on the championship was played as a knock-out tournament until a winner was crowned with an additional match to determine third place.

The capacity of the arena used for this edition of the World Championships was scaled down from the 12,000 seats available in the two previous events, to 7,000 for this year's tournament.

== Teams ==
Africa and Oceania were unrepresented.

Asian Zone (1):

- Japan^{1}

European Zone (3):

- France^{1}
- Italy
- Portugal^{1}

North American Zone (1):

- United States

South American Zone (2):

- Argentina
- Uruguay

Hosts:

- Brazil (South America)

Notes:

1. Teams making their debut

== Group stage ==
=== Group A ===
Pos	Team	Pld	W	W+	L	GF	GA	GD	Pts	Qualification
1	Brazil	3	3	0	0	27	8	+19	9	Advance to knockout stage
2	United States	3	2	0	1	12	11	+1	6	Advance to knockout stage
3	Portugal	3	1	0	2	14	18	–4	3	
4	Japan	3	0	0	3	5	21	–16	0	

January 14, 1997

Brazil	12–3	Japan

Copacabana beach
January 14, 1997

United States	7–5	Portugal

Copacabana beach

January 15, 1997

Brazil	10–2	Portugal

Copacabana beach
January 15, 1997

United States	2–1	Japan

Copacabana beach

January 16, 1997

Brazil	5–3	United States

Copacabana beach
January 16, 1997

Portugal	7–1	Japan

Copacabana beach

=== Group B ===
Pos	Team	Pld	W	W+	L	GF	GA	GD	Pts	Qualification
1	Uruguay	3	2	0	1	16	15	+1	6	Advance to knockout stage
2	Argentina	3	2	0	1	10	8	+2	6	Advance to knockout stage
3	Italy	3	1	0	2	12	11	+1	3	
4	France	3	1	0	2	7	10	–3	3	

January 14, 1997

Uruguay	5–4	Argentina

Copacabana beach
January 14, 1997

Italy	4–1	France

Copacabana beach

January 15, 1997

France	5–4	Uruguay

Copacabana beach
January 15, 1997

Argentina	3–2	Italy

Copacabana beach

January 16, 1997

Argentina	3–1	France

Copacabana beach
January 16, 1997

Uruguay	7–6	Italy

Copacabana beach

== Knockout stage ==
=== Semi-finals ===
January 18, 1997

Uruguay	4–4 (a.e.t.)	United States
Penalties
	2–1

Copacabana beach

January 18, 1997

Brazil	14–3	Argentina

Copacabana beach

=== Third place play-off ===
January 19, 1997

United States	5–1	Argentina

Copacabana beach

=== Final ===
January 19, 1997

Brazil	5–2	Uruguay
Júnior 6', 13'; Magal (?), 15'; Edinho 19'	Report	3', 36' Ramos

Copacabana beach
Attendance: 7,000

== Winners ==
1997 Beach Soccer World Championships
champions

Brazil
Third title

== Awards ==
Top scorers
(Brazil) Júnior	(Uruguay) Venancio Ramos
11 goals
Best player
(Brazil) Júnior
Best goalkeeper
(Brazil) Paulo Sérgio

== Final standings ==
Pos	Grp	Team	Pld	W	W+	L	GF	GA	GD	Pts	Final result
1	B	Brazil	5	5	0	0	46	13	+33	15	Champions
2	A	Uruguay	5	2	1	2	22	24	−2	8	Runners-up
3	B	United States	5	3	0	2	21	16	+5	9	Third place
4	A	Argentina	5	2	0	3	14	27	−13	6	Fourth place
5	A	Italy	3	1	0	2	12	11	+1	3	Eliminated in the group stage
6	B	Portugal	3	1	0	2	14	18	−4	3	Eliminated in the group stage
7	A	France	3	1	0	2	7	11	−4	3	Eliminated in the group stage
8	B	Japan	3	0	0	3	5	21	−16	0	Eliminated in the group stage

== Sources ==
- RSSSF
- Roonba
