= 1998 Beach Soccer World Championships =

Tournament details
- Host country: Brazil
- Dates: January 18–25
- Teams: 10 (from 3 confederations)
- Venue(s): 1 (in 1 host city)

Final positions
- Champions: Brazil (4th title)
- Runners-up: France
- Third place: Uruguay
- Fourth place: Peru

Tournament statistics
- Matches played: 24
- Goals scored: 216 (9 per match)
- Top scorer(s): (Brazil) Júnior (14 goals)
- Best player(s): (Brazil) Júnior
- Best goalkeeper: (Brazil) Paulo Sérgio

The 1998 Beach Soccer World Championships was the fourth edition of the Beach Soccer World Championships, the most prestigious competition in international beach soccer contested by men's national teams until 2005, when the competition was then replaced by the second iteration of a world cup in beach soccer, the better known FIFA Beach Soccer World Cup. It was organised by Brazilian sports agency Koch Tavares (one of the founding partners of Beach Soccer Worldwide).

The tournament continued to take place at Copacabana Beach in Rio de Janeiro, Brazil. For the first time, the number of teams competing was raised, from eight to ten. This change saw the longest group stage until the world cup became a 16-team event in 2006.

Brazil, the three-time defending champions, successfully defended their title again to win their fourth World Championship by beating France 9–2 in the final. This was the first time a European nation appeared in the final of the World Championship.

== Organisation ==
The number of teams competing this year was increased to ten which meant necessary alterations to the past organisational structure of the tournament.

The nations were split into two groups, just as in previous editions, however this time since ten nations were competing instead of eight, both groups consisted of five nations rather than four. The countries competed in a round robin format. The top two teams then progressed to the semi-finals from which point onward the championship was played as a knock-out tournament until a winner was crowned, with an additional match to determine third place.

== Teams ==
Africa, Asia and Oceania were unrepresented.

European Zone (4):

- Spain^{1}
- Italy
- France
- Portugal

North American Zone (1):

- United States

South American Zone (4):

- Argentina
- Chile^{1}
- Peru^{1}
- Uruguay

Hosts:

- Brazil (South America)

Notes:

1. Teams making their debut

== Group stage ==
=== Group A ===
Pos	Team	Pld	W	W+	L	GF	GA	GD	Pts	Qualification
1	Brazil	4	4	0	0	38	6	+32	12	Advance to knockout stage
2	Peru	4	3	0	1	21	23	–2	9	Advance to knockout stage
3	Spain	4	2	0	2	17	22	–5	6	
4	Argentina	4	1	0	3	13	19	–6	3	
5	Italy	4	0	0	4	12	31	–19	0	

January 18, 1998

Brazil	14–1	Italy

Copacabana beach
January 18, 1998

Argentina	4–5	Peru

Copacabana beach

January 19, 1998

Brazil	9–2	Peru

Copacabana beach
January 19, 1998

Spain	4–3	Italy

Copacabana beach

January 20, 1998

Peru	7–4	Italy

Copacabana beach
January 20, 1998

Spain	5–2	Argentina

Copacabana beach

January 21, 1998

Brazil	5–1	Argentina

Copacabana beach
January 21, 1998

Peru	7–6	Spain

Copacabana beach

January 22, 1998

Argentina	6–4	Italy

Copacabana beach
January 22, 1998

Brazil	10–2	Spain

Copacabana beach

=== Group B ===
Pos	Team	Pld	W	W+	L	GF	GA	GD	Pts	Qualification
1	France	4	3	0	1	17	15	+2	9	Advance to knockout stage
2	Uruguay	4	2	0	2	15	17	–2	6	Advance to knockout stage
3	Portugal	4	2	0	2	22	13	+9	6	
4	United States	4	2	0	2	13	14	–1	6	
5	Chile	4	1	0	3	14	22	–8	3	

Note:

- Portugal, the United States and Uruguay were tied on 6 points each and one win against each other in their head-to-head records
- Uruguay progressed based on having the best goal difference in the head-to-head results (URU +1, POR 0, USA –1)

January 18, 1998

Portugal	11–1	Chile

Copacabana beach
January 18, 1998

United States	4–2	Uruguay

Copacabana beach

January 19, 1998

Chile	5–1	Uruguay

Copacabana beach
January 19, 1998

France	4–3	United States

Copacabana beach

January 20, 1998

France	3–2	Portugal

Copacabana beach
January 20, 1998

United States	4–3	Chile

Copacabana beach

January 21, 1998

France	6–5	Chile

Copacabana beach
January 21, 1998

Uruguay	7–4	Portugal

Copacabana beach

January 22, 1998

Portugal	5–2	United States

Copacabana beach
January 22, 1998

Uruguay	5–4	France

Copacabana beach

== Knockout stage ==
=== Semi-finals ===
January 24, 1998

France	4–4 (a.e.t.)	Peru
Penalties
	2–1

Copacabana beach

January 24, 1998

Brazil	5–1	Uruguay

Copacabana beach

=== Third place play-off ===
January 25, 1998

Uruguay	6–3	Peru

Copacabana beach

=== Final ===
January 25, 1998
10:00 UTC−2

Brazil	9–2	France
Júnior; Neném; Magal; Júnior Negão; Renan; Juninho	Report	Jeannol; Micciche

Copacabana beach

== Winners ==
1998 Beach Soccer World Championships
champions

Brazil
Fourth title

== Awards ==
Top scorers
(Brazil) Júnior
14 goals
Best player
(Brazil) Júnior
Best goalkeeper
(Brazil) Paulo Sérgio

== Final standings ==
Pos	Grp	Team	Pld	W	W+	L	GF	GA	GD	Pts	Final result
1	A	Brazil	6	6	0	0	52	9	+43	18	Champions
2	B	France	6	3	1	2	24	29	−5	11	Runners-up
3	B	Uruguay	6	3	0	3	22	25	−3	9	Third place
4	A	Peru	6	3	0	3	29	34	−5	9	Fourth place
5	B	Portugal	4	2	0	2	22	13	+9	6	Eliminated in the group stage
6	A	Spain	4	2	0	2	17	22	−5	6	Eliminated in the group stage
7	B	United States	4	2	0	2	13	14	−1	6	Eliminated in the group stage
8	A	Argentina	4	1	0	3	13	19	−6	3	Eliminated in the group stage
9	B	Chile	4	1	0	3	14	22	−8	3	Eliminated in the group stage
10	A	Italy	4	0	0	4	12	31	−19	0	Eliminated in the group stage

== Sources ==
- RSSSF
- Roonba
