= Marina da Glória =

Olympic sailing venue in Rio de Janeiro, Brazil

Coordinates: 22°55′13″S 43°10′11″W

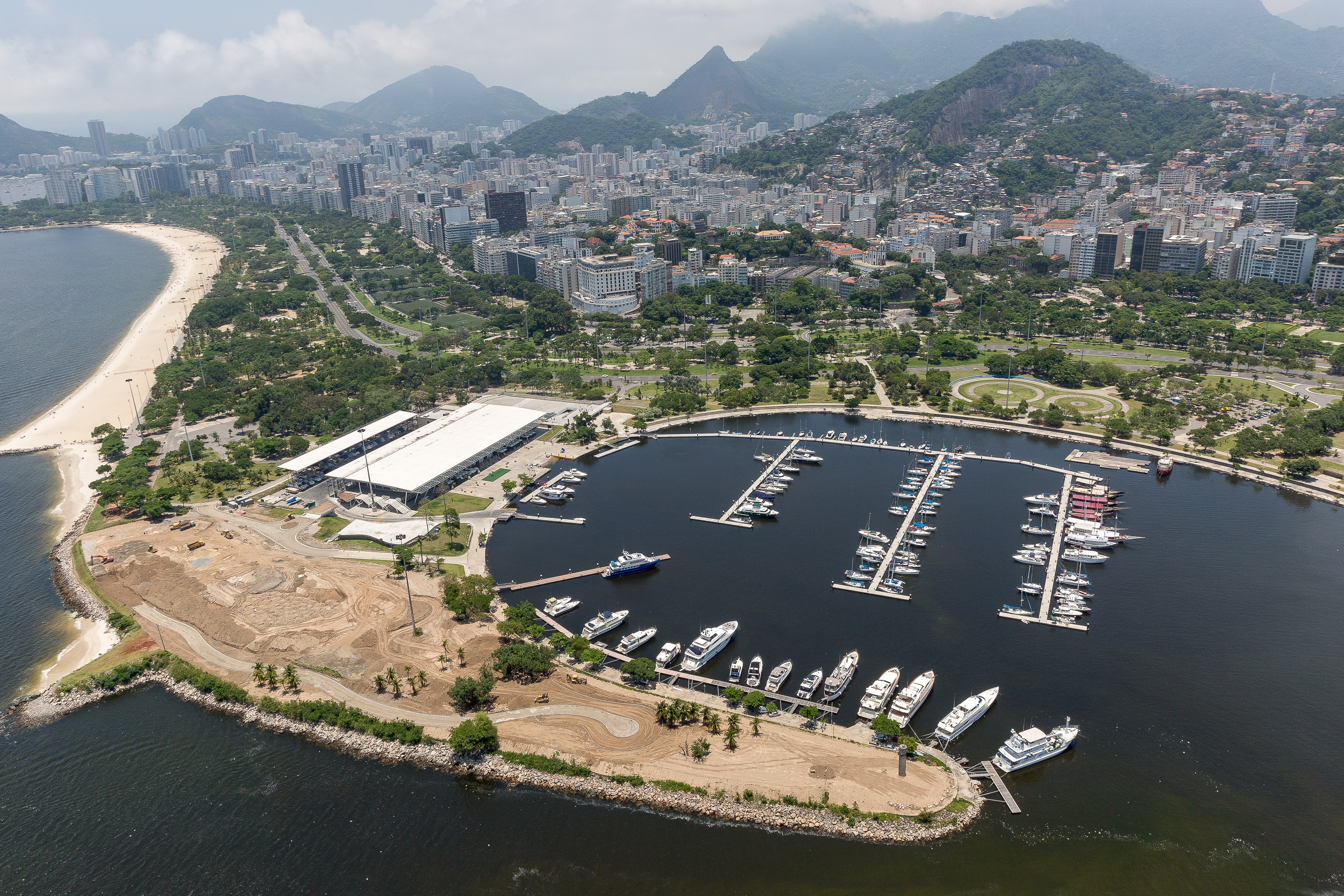
Marina da Glória with Downtown Rio in the background

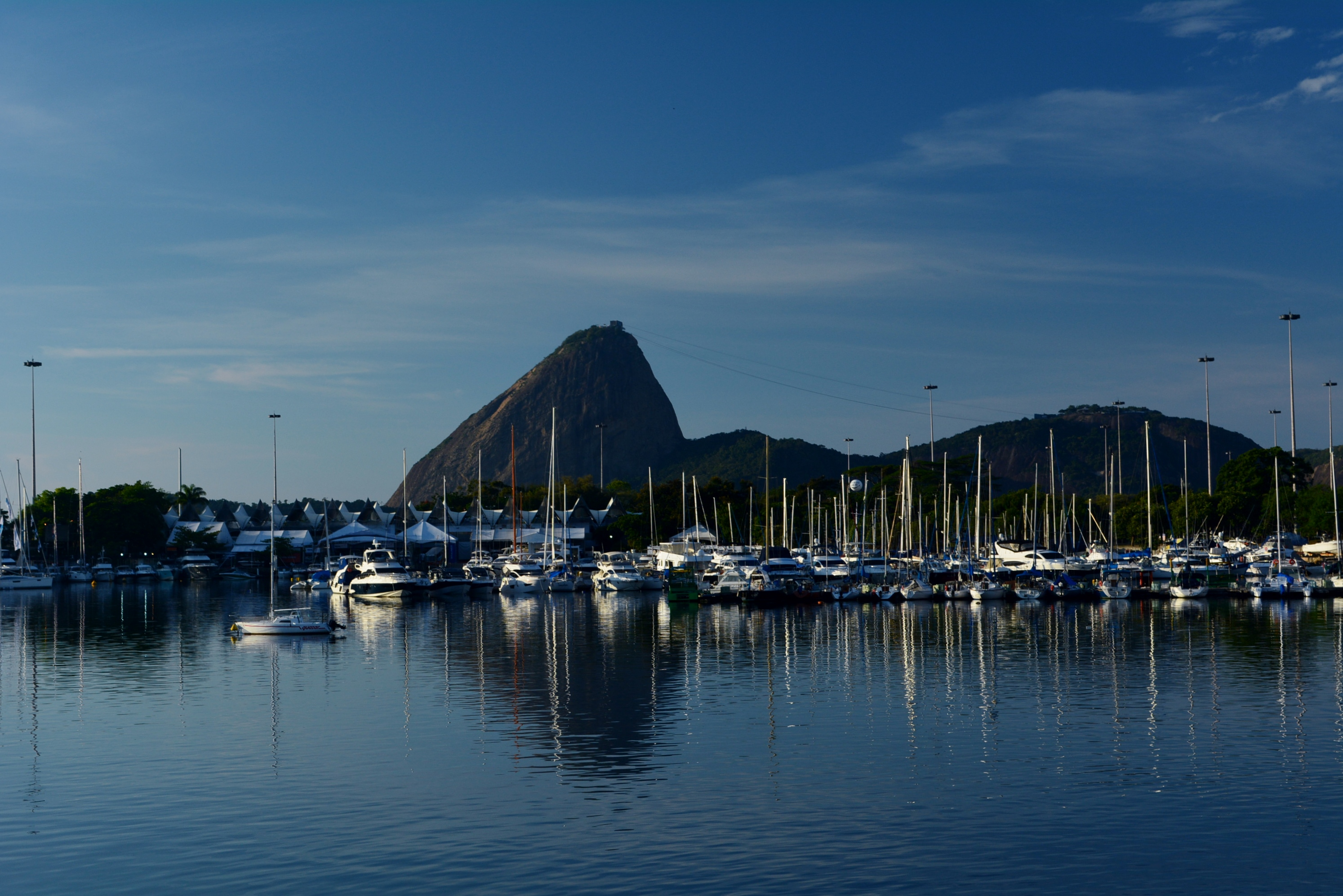
Marina da Glória panorama.

Marina da Glória is a marina located in the neighbourhood of Glória in Rio de Janeiro, Brazil. This venue hosted the sailing events for the 2016 Summer Olympics within the Flamengo Park cluster, from 7 to 19 August 2016. and the 2016 Summer Paralympics. It also hosted the draw procedure for the Qualification for the 2014 FIFA World Cup.
