= Edinho (footballer, born 1955) =

Brazilian footballer and manager

Personal information
- Full name: Edino Nazareth Filho
- Date of birth: 5 June 1955 (age 71)
- Place of birth: Rio de Janeiro, Brazil
- Position: Defender

Youth career
- 1969–1974: Fluminense

Senior career*
Years	Team	Apps	(Gls)
1975–1982	Fluminense	88	(11)
1982–1987	Udinese	138	(22)
1987–1988	Flamengo	11	(0)
1988–1989	Fluminense	27	(3)
1989–1990	Grêmio	8	(1)
1990	Toronto Blizzard	20	(3)
Total		292	(42)

International career
1977–1986	Brazil	45	(3)

Managerial career
- 1991: Fluminense
- 1992: Botafogo
- 1993: Fluminense
- 1993–1994: Marítimo
- 1994–1995: Flamengo
- 1996: Vitória
- 1997: Portuguesa
- 1998: Fluminense
- 1998: Grêmio
- 2002: Goiás
- 2003: Vitória
- 2003: Bahia
- 2004–2005: Brasiliense
- 2005: Atlético Paranaense
- 2005: Sport Recife
- 2006: Portuguesa
- 2009: Boavista
- 2010: Joinville
- 2010–2011: Americana
Medal record
Pan American Games
Gold medal – first place	1975 Mexico City	Team competition
- * Club domestic league appearances and goals

Edino Nazareth Filho (born 5 June 1955), known as Edinho, is a Brazilian football commentator, manager and former player. He played as a central defender with Fluminense, Grêmio, the second Toronto Blizzard and the Brazil national team.

== International career ==
Edinho obtained 45 caps with the Brazil national team between March 1977 and June 1986. He took part at three "FIFA World Cup" final tournament.

He played 3 matches in the 1978 FIFA World Cup, in Argentina. He appeared only once during the 1982 FIFA World Cup, subbing in for Oscar after 75 minutes against New Zealand. He played all Brazil's five matches during the 1986 FIFA World Cup in which he was captain, scoring one goal.

Edinho was also in the team which finished fourth in football at the 1976 Summer Olympics and won a gold medal in football at the 1975 Pan American Games.

After retiring and past the age of 40, he made a career at beach soccer. He was part of the winning Brazilian team on the first 3 Beach Soccer World Championships in 1995, 1996 and 1997. He was selected as the best player from the 1996 tournament.

== Honours ==
=== Player ===
Brazil

- Pan-American Games: 1975

Fluminense

- Campeonato Carioca: 1975, 1976, 1980

Flamengo

- Copa União: 1987

Grêmio

- Campeonato Gaúcho: 1989
- Copa do Brasil: 1989

=== Manager ===
Fluminense

- Taça Guanabara: 1991, 1993

Vitória-BA

- Campeonato Baiano: 1996,

Goias

- Campeonato Goiano: 2002
- Copa Centro-Oeste: 2002

Brasiliense

- Campeonato Brasileiro Série B: 2004

Atlético Paranaense

- Campeonato Paranaense: 2005
