= 1996 Beach Soccer World Championships =

Tournament details
- Host country: Brazil
- Dates: January 30 – February 4
- Teams: 8 (from 3 confederations)
- Venue: 1 (in 1 host city)

Final positions
- Champions: Brazil (2nd title)
- Runners-up: Uruguay
- Third place: Italy
- Fourth place: United States

Tournament statistics
- Matches played: 16
- Goals scored: 132 (8.25 per match)
- Top scorer: (Italy) Alessandro Altobelli (14 goals)
- Best player: (Brazil) Edinho
- Best goalkeeper: (Brazil) Paulo Sérgio

The 1996 Beach Soccer World Championships was the second edition of the Beach Soccer World Championships, the most prestigious competition in international beach soccer contested by men's national teams until 2005, when the competition was then replaced by the second iteration of a world cup in beach soccer, the better known FIFA Beach Soccer World Cup. It was organised by Brazilian sports agency Koch Tavares (one of the founding partners of Beach Soccer Worldwide).

The tournament again took place at Copacabana Beach in Rio de Janeiro, Brazil, as it did during the maiden edition a year earlier.

Brazil successfully defended their title by beating Uruguay 3–0 in what was the lowest scoring final to date, to win their second World Championship. The Uruguayans remained the only side not to score in a world cup final until Tahiti also failed to do so in 2017.

This edition is one of only two world cups after the first (the other being 2003) when no matches went beyond regulation time.

== Organisation ==
The organisation remained the same as the format established for the maiden event in the previous year; the eight participating nations competed in two groups of four teams in a round robin format. The top two teams progressed straight to the semi-finals from which point on the championship was played as a knock-out tournament until a winner was crowned with an additional match to determine third place.

The capacity of the arena used for this edition of the World Championships remained the same as in 1995, at 12,000 seats available for spectators.

== Teams ==
Africa, Asia and Oceania were unrepresented.

European Zone (3):

- Denmark^{1}
- Italy
- Russia^{1}

North American Zone (2):

- Canada^{1}
- United States

South American Zone (2):

- Argentina
- Uruguay

Hosts:

- Brazil (South America)

Notes:

1. Teams making their debut

== Group stage ==
=== Group A ===
Pos	Team	Pld	W	W+	L	GF	GA	GD	Pts	Qualification
1	Brazil	3	3	0	0	24	5	+19	9	Advance to knockout stage
2	Uruguay	3	1	0	2	12	13	–1	3	Advance to knockout stage
3	Denmark	3	1	0	2	10	16	–6	3	
4	Canada	3	1	0	2	12	24	–12	3	

January 30, 1996

Uruguay	5–6	Canada

Copacabana beach
January 30, 1996

Brazil	7–1	Denmark

Copacabana beach

January 31, 1996

Uruguay	5–3	Denmark

Copacabana beach
January 31, 1996

Brazil	13–2	Canada

Copacabana beach

February 1, 1996

Denmark	6–4	Canada

Copacabana beach
February 1, 1996

Brazil	4–2	Uruguay

Copacabana beach

=== Group B ===
Pos	Team	Pld	W	W+	L	GF	GA	GD	Pts	Qualification
1	United States	3	3	0	0	14	9	+5	9	Advance to knockout stage
2	Italy	3	2	0	1	14	9	+5	6	Advance to knockout stage
3	Russia	3	1	0	2	8	10	–2	3	
4	Argentina	3	0	0	3	5	13	–8	0	

January 30, 1996

United States	4–2	Argentina

Copacabana beach
January 30, 1996

Italy	5–1	Russia

Copacabana beach

January 31, 1996

Russia	4–1	Argentina

Copacabana beach
January 31, 1996

United States	6–4	Italy

Copacabana beach

February 1, 1996

Italy	5–2	Argentina

Copacabana beach
February 1, 1996

United States	4–3	Russia

Copacabana beach

== Knockout stage ==
=== Semi-finals ===
February 3, 1996

Uruguay	7–0	United States

Copacabana beach

February 3, 1996

Brazil	12–4	Italy

Copacabana beach

=== Third place play-off ===
February 4, 1996

Italy	4–3	United States

Copacabana beach

=== Final ===
February 4, 1996
10:00 UTC-2

Brazil	3–0	Uruguay
Zico; Magal; Neném	Report

Copacabana beach
Referee: Jose Roberto Wright

== Winners ==
1996 Beach Soccer World Championships
champions

Brazil
Second title

== Awards ==
Top scorer
(Italy) Alessandro Altobelli
14 goals^{2}
Best player
(Brazil) Edinho
Best goalkeeper
(Brazil) Paulo Sérgio

2. Other sources suggest 13 goals

== Final standings ==
Pos	Grp	Team	Pld	W	W+	L	GF	GA	GD	Pts	Final result
1	A	Brazil	5	5	0	0	39	9	+30	15	Champions
2	A	Uruguay	5	2	0	3	19	16	+3	6	Runners-up
3	B	Italy	5	3	0	2	22	24	−2	9	Third place
4	B	United States	5	3	0	2	17	20	−3	9	Fourth place
5	B	Russia	3	1	0	2	8	10	−2	3	Eliminated in the group stage
6	A	Denmark	3	1	0	2	10	16	−6	3	Eliminated in the group stage
7	A	Canada	3	1	0	2	12	24	−12	3	Eliminated in the group stage
8	B	Argentina	3	0	0	3	5	13	−8	0	Eliminated in the group stage

== Sources ==
- RSSSF
- Roonba
