= Daylight saving time in Brazil =

Brazil observed daylight saving time (DST) (called horário de verão – "summer time" – in Portuguese) in the years of 1931–1933, 1949–1953, 1963–1968 and 1985–2019. Initially it applied to the whole country, but from 1988 it applied only to part of the country, usually the southern regions, where DST is more useful due to a larger seasonal variation in daylight duration.

The most recent DST rule specified advancing the time by one hour during the period from 00:00 on the first Sunday in November to 00:00 on the third Sunday in February (postponed by one week if the latter fell on carnival), applicable only to the South, Southeast and Central-West regions. Brazil abolished DST in 2019.

== List of DST observances ==
year	DST start	DST end	areas observing DST																										
1931–1932	3 October 1931	1 April 1932	all of Brazil																										
1932–1933	3 October 1932	1 April 1933	all of Brazil																										
1949–1950	1 December 1949	16 April 1950	all of Brazil																										
1950–1951	1 December 1950	1 April 1951	all of Brazil																										
1951–1952	1 December 1951	1 April 1952	all of Brazil																										
1952–1953	1 December 1952	1 March 1953	all of Brazil																										
1963–1964	23 October 1963	1 March 1964				Southeast (Note: States existing at that time which would correspond to the Southeast region defined in 1970.)																							
1963–1964	9 December 1963	1 March 1964	all of Brazil																										
1964–1965	31 January 1965	1 April 1965	all of Brazil																										
1965–1966	1 December 1965	1 March 1966	all of Brazil																										
1966–1967	1 November 1966	1 March 1967	all of Brazil																										
1967–1968	1 November 1967	1 March 1968	all of Brazil																										
1985–1986	2 November 1985	15 March 1986	all of Brazil																										
1986–1987	25 October 1986	14 February 1987	all of Brazil																										
1987–1988	25 October 1987	7 February 1988	all of Brazil																										
1988–1989	16 October 1988	29 January 1989	South			Southeast				Central-West				Northeast									TO						
1989–1990	15 October 1989	11 February 1990	South			Southeast				Central-West				Northeast									TO						
1990–1991	21 October 1990	17 February 1991	South			Southeast				Central-West				BA															
1991–1992	20 October 1991	9 February 1992	South			Southeast				Central-West				BA															
1992–1993	25 October 1992	31 January 1993	South			Southeast				Central-West				BA															
1993–1994	17 October 1993	20 February 1994	South			Southeast				Central-West				BA												AM			
1994–1995	16 October 1994	19 February 1995	South			Southeast				Central-West				BA															
1995–1996	15 October 1995	11 February 1996	South			Southeast				Central-West				BA	SE	AL							TO						
1996–1997	6 October 1996	16 February 1997	South			Southeast				Central-West				BA									TO						
1997–1998	6 October 1997	1 March 1998	South			Southeast				Central-West				BA									TO						
1998–1999	11 October 1998	21 February 1999	South			Southeast				Central-West				BA									TO						
1999–2000	3 October 1999	27 February 2000	South			Southeast				Central-West				Northeast									TO				RR		
2000–2001	8 October 2000	15 October 2000	South			Southeast				Central-West				Northeast									TO				RR		
2000–2001	8 October 2000	22 October 2000	South			Southeast				Central-West				BA	SE	AL		PB	RN	CE	PI	MA	TO						
2000–2001	8 October 2000	18 February 2001	South			Southeast				Central-West				BA									TO						
2001–2002	14 October 2001	17 February 2002	South			Southeast				Central-West				Northeast									TO						
2002–2003	3 November 2002	16 February 2003	South			Southeast				Central-West				BA									TO						
2003–2004	19 October 2003	15 February 2004	South			Southeast				DF	GO	MS																	
2004–2005	2 November 2004	20 February 2005	South			Southeast				Central-West																			
2005–2006	16 October 2005	19 February 2006	South			Southeast				Central-West																			
2006–2007	5 November 2006	25 February 2007	South			Southeast				Central-West																			
2007–2008	14 October 2007	17 February 2008	South			Southeast				Central-West																			
2008–2009	19 October 2008	15 February 2009	South			Southeast				Central-West																			
2009–2010	18 October 2009	21 February 2010	South			Southeast				Central-West																			
2010–2011	17 October 2010	20 February 2011	South			Southeast				Central-West																			
2011–2012	16 October 2011	26 February 2012	South			Southeast				Central-West				BA															
2012–2013	21 October 2012	17 February 2013	South			Southeast				Central-West													TO						
2013–2014	20 October 2013	16 February 2014	South			Southeast				Central-West																			
2014–2015	19 October 2014	22 February 2015	South			Southeast				Central-West																			
2015–2016	18 October 2015	21 February 2016	South			Southeast				Central-West																			
2016–2017	16 October 2016	19 February 2017	South			Southeast				Central-West																			
2017–2018	15 October 2017	18 February 2018	South			Southeast				Central-West																			
2018–2019	4 November 2018	17 February 2019	South			Southeast				Central-West																			
states and federal district			RS	SC	PR	SP	RJ	ES	MG	DF	GO	MS	MT	BA	SE	AL	PE	PB	RN	CE	PI	MA	TO	PA	AP	AM	RR	RO	AC
regions			South			Southeast				Central-West				Northeast									North						

== Starting and ending dates ==
DST starting and ending dates were variable and determined by decree, often set for only one year at a time. Until 1968, the starting date was usually the first day of November or December, and the ending date was usually the first day of March or April, without regard to the day of the week. In 1985–1987 the dates were Saturdays, and from 1987 they were usually Sundays, typically from October to February.

The dates were sometimes adjusted to avoid conflicts with certain events. In 1997, the DST starting date was set to a Monday due to the Pope's mass on Sunday during his visit to Brazil. In 2002, 2004 and 2006, the starting date was postponed to the first Sunday or holiday in November due to elections in October and technical difficulties in adjusting the internal clocks of electronic voting machines. In 2007, the DST ending date was postponed to the Sunday after carnival due to the expected economic benefits of observing DST during that holiday.

In 2008, a decree finally fixed the DST schedule for future years, starting on the third Sunday in October and ending on the third Sunday in February, with an exception for postponing the ending date to the following Sunday if the date would otherwise fall on carnival, which occurred in 2012 and 2015.

In 2018, the starting date was changed to the first Sunday in November to avoid interfering with elections in October. This time there was no technical difficulty, but a desire to shorten the difference in poll closing times between regions with and without DST. Although it was a permanent change to the DST schedule, it was only observed that year as Brazil abolished DST altogether in 2019.

Time changes were almost always done at midnight. The time was advanced from 00:00 to 01:00 on the DST starting date and reduced from 00:00 on the ending date to 23:00 of the previous day. Exceptions were the first DST starting time in 1931 (11:00) and the ending times in 1950 and 1966 (01:00).

== Regional application ==
Historical observance of daylight saving time in Brazil by state (lighter shades mean more years)

Until 1988, in every year that DST was observed it applied to whole country. In 1963 the Southeast region started DST earlier than the rest of the country.

From 1988, DST was typically limited to the South, Southeast and Central-West regions, and was occasionally extended to some other states such as Bahia and Tocantins. In 2000, DST was extended to all states in the Northeast region but was quickly canceled in most of them due to strong local opposition.

== See also ==
- Time in Brazil
- Daylight saving time by country
