= 2003 Beach Soccer World Championships =

IX Beach Soccer World Championships 2003 IX Campeonato Mundial de Beach Soccer (in Portuguese)

Tournament details
- Host country: Brazil
- Dates: 16–23 February
- Teams: 8 (from 4 confederations)
- Venue(s): 1 (in 1 host city)

Final positions
- Champions: Brazil (8th title)
- Runners-up: Spain
- Third place: Portugal
- Fourth place: France

Tournament statistics
- Matches played: 16
- Goals scored: 150 (9.38 per match)
- Attendance: 74,700 (4,669 per match)
- Top scorer(s): (Brazil) Neném (15 goals)
- Best player(s): (Spain) Amarelle
- Best goalkeeper: (Brazil) Robertinho

The 2003 Beach Soccer World Championships was the ninth edition of the Beach Soccer World Championships, the most prestigious competition in international beach soccer contested by men's national teams until 2005, when the competition was then replaced by the second iteration of a world cup in beach soccer, the better known FIFA Beach Soccer World Cup. It was organized by Brazilian sports agency Koch Tavares in cooperation with and under the supervision of Beach Soccer Worldwide (BSWW), the sports governing body.

For the first time since 2000, the tournament returned to its native venue at Copacabana Beach in Rio de Janeiro, Brazil. The main sponsor was McDonald's.

The tournament saw Brazil win their eighth title by beating first time finalists Spain.

== Organisation ==
As like in the previous year, a record low of eight nations competed in two groups of four teams in a round robin format. The top two teams in each group after all the matches of the group stage had been played progressed into the semi-finals, in which the championship proceeded as a knock-out tournament therein until a winner was crowned, with an additional match to decide third place.

== Teams ==
=== Qualification ===
European teams gained qualification by finishing in the top three spots of the 2002 Euro Beach Soccer League. North and South American qualification was based on performances over recent times in a series of events involving teams from the Americas. The other entries received wild-card invites.

Africa and Oceania were unrepresented.

=== Entrants ===
This remains the only year in all nineteen editions when no new nations made their debut at a world cup.

Asian Zone (1):

- Japan^{WC}

European Zone (4):

- Spain
- Portugal
- France
- Italy^{WC}

North American Zone (1):

- United States

South American Zone (1):

- Uruguay

Hosts:

- Brazil (South America)

Notes:

WC. Wild-card entries.

== Group stage ==
Matches are listed as local time in Rio de Janeiro, (UTC-3)

=== Group A ===
Pos	Team	Pld	W	W+	L	GF	GA	GD	Pts	Qualification
1	Brazil	3	3	0	0	26	6	+20	9	Advance to knockout stage
2	Spain	3	2	0	1	19	13	+6	6	Advance to knockout stage
3	Italy	3	1	0	2	11	19	–8	3	
4	United States	3	0	0	3	8	26	–18	0	

February 16, 2003
09:45

Brazil	6–3	Spain
Junior Negão; Buru; Neném; Benjamin	Report	Nico; Eloy

Copacabana beach
Attendance: 6 000
Referee: Carlos Robles (Chile)

February 18, 2003
16:00

Spain	8–3	United States
Amarelle; Nico; Busti; Eloy; Q. Setien; David	Report	Francis; Beto

Copacabana beach
Attendance: 4 200
Referee: Elias Coelho (Brazil)
February 18, 2003

Brazil	7–2	Italy
Junior Negão; Neném; Benjamin; Juninho	Report	Fruzzetti; D’Amico

Copacabana beach
Attendance: 6 000
Referee: Pinto Correia (Portugal)

February 19, 2003

Italy	5–4	United States
Ferrigno; D’Amico; Fruzzetti; Garlini	Report	Albuquerque; Ed; Francis; Beto

Copacabana beach
Attendance: 2 000
Referee: José Luiz da Rosa (Uruguay)

February 20, 2003

Brazil	13–1	United States
Jorginho; Júnior Negão; Benjamin; Neném; Juninho; Júlio César	Report	Beto

Copacabana beach
Attendance: 4 500
Referee: Lakhdar Benchabane (France)
February 20, 2003

Spain	8–4	Italy
Q.Setien; Eloy; Amarelle; Nico; Javi	Report	Garlini; Costacurta; Fruzzetti

Copacabana beach
Attendance: 3 000
Referee: Elias Coelho (Brazil)

=== Group B ===
Pos	Team	Pld	W	W+	L	GF	GA	GD	Pts	Qualification
1	France	3	2	0	1	20	14	+6	6	Advance to knockout stage
2	Portugal	3	2	0	1	14	10	+4	6	Advance to knockout stage
3	Uruguay	3	2	0	1	9	9	0	6	
4	Japan	3	0	0	3	4	14	–10	0	

February 18, 2003

Uruguay	2–1	Japan
Fabian; German	Report	Mochizuki

Copacabana beach
Attendance: 4 500
Referee: Antonio Buaiz (Brazil)
February 18, 2003

France	8–6	Portugal
Bonora; Edouard; Ottavy; Sciortino; Samoun	Report	Madjer; Hernani; Belchior; Alan

Copacabana beach
Attendance: 6 000
Referee: Carlos Robles (Chile)

February 19, 2003
17:00

Uruguay	6–5	France
Nico; Fabian; Pico; Chueco; German	Report	Sciortino; Jairzinho; Marquet; Samoun; Cantona

Copacabana beach
Attendance: 2 000
Referee: Evaldo Wellington (Brazil)
February 19, 2003

Portugal	5–1	Japan
Alan; Madjer	Report	Touma

Copacabana beach
Attendance: 2 000
Referee: Elias Coelho (Brazil)

February 20, 2003
16:00

France	7–2	Japan
Sciortino; Jairzinho; Bonora; Cantona	Report	Mochizuki; Kawakubo

Copacabana beach
Attendance: 4 500
Referee: Massimo Magrini (Italy)
February 20, 2003

Portugal	3–1	Uruguay
Alan; Setemeio	Report	Nico

Copacabana beach
Attendance: 6 000
Referee: Carlos Robles (Chile)

== Knockout stage ==
February 21 was allocated as a rest day.

Semi-finals
22 February
Brazil	7
Portugal	2
22 February
Spain	5
France	4

Final
23 February
Brazil	8
Spain	2
Third place play-off
23 February
Portugal	7
France	4

=== Semi-finals ===
February 22, 2003
08:45

Spain	5–4	France
Amarelle; Nico	Report	Jairzinho; Bonora; Sciortino; Marquet

Copacabana beach
Attendance: 6 000
Referee: Antonio Buaiz (Brazil)

February 22, 2003
10:00

Brazil	7–2	Portugal
Buru; Jorginho; Benjamin; Neném; Júnior Negão	Report	Madjer; Hernani

Copacabana beach
Attendance: 6 000
Referee: Carlos Robles (Chile)

=== Third place play-off ===
February 23, 2003
08:00

Portugal	7–4	France
Madjer; Alan; Belchior; Pedro Vieira; Pedro Jorge	Report	Marquet; Cantona; Sciortino; Bonora

Copacabana beach
Attendance: 6 000
Referee: João Alberto (Brazil)

=== Final ===
February 23, 2003
09:30

Brazil	8–2	Spain
Júnior Negão; Benjamin; Neném; Jorginho	Report	Amarelle; Nico

Copacabana beach
Attendance: 6 000
Referee: José Luiz da Rosa (Uruguay)

== Winners ==
2003 Beach Soccer World Championships
champions

Brazil
Eighth title

== Awards ==
Top scorer
(Brazil) Neném
15 goals
Best player
(Spain) Amarelle
Best goalkeeper
(Brazil) Robertinho
Rookie of the year
(Spain) Eloy Barreiro

== Top goalscorers ==
15 goals

- (Brazil) Neném

10 goals

- (Spain) Amarelle
- (Portugal) Madjer

9 goals

- (Brazil) Júnior Negão

8 goals

- (France) Sciortino
- (Brazil) Benjamin

6 goals

- (Spain) Nico

5 goals

- (France) Bonora
- (Portugal) Alan

4 goals

- (Brazil) Jorginho
- (Italy) Fruzzetti
- (Spain) Eloy

3 goals

- (Spain) Q. Setién
- (United States) Francis
- (United States) Beto
- (France) Samoun
- (France) Jairzinho
- (France) Marquet
- (France) Cantona
- (Portugal) Hernani
- (Uruguay) Nico

2 goals

- (Brazil) Buru
- (Brazil) Juninho
- (Italy) D’Amico
- (Italy) Ferrigno
- (Italy) Garlini
- (Uruguay) Fabian
- (Uruguay) German
- (Japan) Mochizuki
- (France) Ottavy
- (Portugal) Belchior

15 others scored 1 goal each

== Final standings ==
Pos	Grp	Team	Pld	W	W+	L	GF	GA	GD	Pts	Final result
1	A	Brazil	5	5	0	0	41	10	+31	15	Champions
2	A	Spain	5	3	0	2	26	25	+1	9	Runners-up
3	B	Portugal	5	3	0	2	23	21	+2	9	Third place
4	B	France	5	2	0	3	28	26	+2	6	Fourth place
5	B	Uruguay	3	2	0	1	9	9	0	6	Eliminated in the group stage
6	A	Italy	3	1	0	2	11	19	−8	3	Eliminated in the group stage
7	B	Japan	3	0	0	3	4	14	−10	0	Eliminated in the group stage
8	A	United States	3	0	0	3	8	26	−18	0	Eliminated in the group stage

== Sources ==
- RSSSF
- roonba
- BSWW
- Big Soccer
- Awards
- Scorers (incomplete)
