= Paulo Sérgio (footballer, born 1954) =

Brazilian footballer

Personal information
- Full name: Paulo Sérgio de Oliveira Lima
- Date of birth: July 24, 1954 (age 72)
- Place of birth: Rio de Janeiro, Brazil
- Height: 1.78 m (5 ft 10 in)
- Position: Goalkeeper

Senior career*
Years	Team	Apps	(Gls)
1972–1975	Fluminense	0	(0)
1976	CSA	1	(0)
1977	Volta Redonda	8	(0)
1978–1979	Americano	26	(0)
1980–1984	Botafogo	72	(0)
1985	Goias	9	(0)
1985	America	0	(0)
1986	Vasco da Gama	4	(0)
1986–1987	America	10	(0)
Total		130	(0)

International career
1981–1982	Brazil	3	(0)
- * Club domestic league appearances and goals

Paulo Sérgio de Oliveira Lima (born 24 July 1954), better known as Paulo Sérgio, is a Brazilian former footballer who played as a goalkeeper.

During his career (1972–1988) he played for Fluminense, CSA, Volta Redonda, Americano, Botafogo, Goiás, Vasco da Gama and America. For the Brazilian team he played three matches, between May 1981 and May 1982, and was in the squad for the 1982 FIFA World Cup.
