= France national beach soccer team =

France
- Nickname(s): Les Bleus (The Blues); Les Tricolores (The Tri-colors)
- Association: Fédération Française de Football (FFF)
- Confederation: UEFA (Europe)
- Head coach: Stéphane François
- Captain: Jérémy Basquaise
- Most caps: Stéphane François (87)
- Top scorer: Jérémy Basquaise (61)
- FIFA code: FRA
- BSWW ranking: 26 ▲3 (19 January 2026)
First colours
Second colours

First international
- Italy 4–1 France; 14 January 1997

Biggest win
- France 15–3 England; 7 July 2001

Biggest defeat
- France 3–14 United States (Marseille, France; July 01, 1996)

World Cup
- Appearances: 12 (first in 1997)
- Best result: (gold) Champions, 2005

Euro Beach Soccer League
- Appearances: 17 (first in 1999)
- Best result: (gold) Champions, (2004)

Euro Beach Soccer Cup
- Appearances: 12 (first in 1998)
- Best result: Runners-up (2003), (2006), (2007)

The France national beach soccer team represents France in international beach soccer competitions and is controlled by the FFF, the governing body for football in France.

== Competitive record ==
FIFA Beach Soccer World Cup Qualification Record
Year	Result	Pld	W	WE	WP	L	GS	GA	Dif	Pts
(Spain) 2008	-	-	-	-	-	-	-	-	-	-
(Spain) 2009	Quarterfinals	6	4	0	0	2	30	22	+8	12
(Italy) 2011	Round of 16	4	3	0	0	1	30	17	+13	9
(Russia) 2013	Playoff Stage	7	2	0	2	3	30	33	-3	6
(Italy) 2015	14th Place	8	3	0	0	5	28	30	-2	9
(Italy) 2017	7th Place	8	5	0	1	2	38	36	+2	16
(Russia) 2019	Round of 16th	4	2	0	0	2	13	21	–8	6
(Portugal) 2021	9th Place	5	3	0	0	2	20	18	–12	18
(Azerbaijan) 2023	Ongoing	-	-	-	-	-	-	-	-	-
Total	8/9	37	19	0	3	15	169	159	+10	60

== Current squad ==
Correct as of July 2012:

Note: Flags indicate national team as defined under FIFA eligibility rules; some limited exceptions apply. Players may hold more than one non-FIFA nationality.

No.	Pos.	Nation	Player
1	GK	FRA	Robin Gasset
2	DF	FRA	Julien Soares
4	DF	FRA	Jmarc Edouard
5	DF	FRA	Didier Samoun
6	DF	FRA	Anthony Fayos
7	MF	FRA	Jérémy Basquaise
8	MF	FRA	Stéphane François

No.	Pos.	Nation	Player
9	FW	FRA	Mickael Pagis (captain)
10	FW	FRA	Jeremy Bru
11	FW	FRA	Romain Tossem
12	DF	FRA	Anthony Mendy
14	FW	FRA	Frédéric Mendy
16	GK	FRA	Denis Fort
16	FW	FRA	Killer Cronk

Coach: Stéphane François

== Notable players ==
- Eric Cantona
- Andy Delort
- Samir Belamri
- Jairzinho Cardoso
- Thierry Ottavy
- Jean Saidou
- Gregory Tanagro
- Mickaël Pagis
- Sébastien Sansoni
- Kalandje O.Mponda

== Achievements ==
- 2011 Euro Beach Soccer League Promotional winners
- FIFA Beach Soccer World Cup: 1 (2005)
- Euro Beach Soccer League: 1 (2004)
