= Beach soccer at the 2019 European Games =

Tournament details
- Host country: Belarus
- Dates: 25–29 June
- Teams: 8 (from 1 confederation)
- Venue(s): Olympic Sports Complex

Final positions
- Champions: Portugal (1st title)
- Runners-up: Spain
- Third place: Switzerland
- Fourth place: Ukraine

Tournament statistics
- Matches played: 20
- Goals scored: 171 (8.55 per match)
- Top scorer(s): (Italy) Gabriele Gori (11 goals)

The beach soccer tournament at the 2019 European Games was held from 25 to 29 June. It was the second edition of beach soccer at the European Games.

Eight men’s teams, comprising 96 athletes, competed over five days of competition.

== Medalists ==
Event	Gold	Silver	Bronze
Men	Portugal; Elinton Andrade; Nuno Belchior; Ruben Brilhante; Rui Coimbra; João Gonçalves; André Lourenço; Tiago Petrony; Bê Martins; Jordan Santos; Léo Martins; Madjer; Pedro Silva	Spain; David Ardil; Salvador Ardil; Domingo Cabrera; José Cintas; Francisco Donaire; Adrián Frutos; Llorenç Gómez; Pablo López; Antonio Mayor; Mario Soria; Eduard Suárez; Javier Torres	Switzerland; Philipp Borer; Silvan Conrad; Glenn Hodel; Valentin Jaeggy; Jan Ostgen; Noël Ott; Sandro Spaccarotella; Nico Stalder; Dejan Stankovic; Tobias Steinemann; Nicholas Stucki; Angelo Wüest

== Qualification ==
Belarus is qualified as host country. The remaining seven teams have qualified through the 2018 Euro Beach Soccer League (EBSL). The top six teams in the Superfinal will qualify with the top team from the Promotional Final.

Means of qualification	Date of competition	Venue	Berths	Qualified
Host country			1	Belarus
2018 EBSL Superfinal	6–9 September 2018	(Italy) Alghero	6	Italy; Spain; Portugal; Russia; Switzerland; Ukraine
2018 EBSL Promotion Final	6–9 September 2018	(Italy) Alghero	1	Romania
Total			8	

== Draw ==
The draw was held on 4 April 2019 in the conference hall of the National Olympic Stadium Dynamo in Minsk, Belarus.

=== Seedings ===
Pot 1	Pot 2	Pot 3	Pot 4
Belarus (A1); Italy (B1)	Spain; Portugal	Russia; Switzerland	Ukraine; Romania

== Group round ==
All times are local (UTC+3).

=== Group A ===
Pos	Team	Pld	W	W+	WP	L	GF	GA	GD	Pts	Qualification
1	Portugal	3	2	0	0	1	16	8	+8	6	Semifinals
2	Switzerland	3	1	1	0	1	18	6	+12	5	Semifinals
3	Belarus (H)	3	1	0	1	1	14	13	+1	4	5–8th place semifinals
4	Romania	3	0	0	0	3	3	24	−21	0	5–8th place semifinals

Source: Minsk 2019
(H) Host
25 June 2019
14:00

Portugal	1–3 (a.e.t.)	Switzerland
Borer 2' (o.g.)	Report	Hodel 32'; Jaeggy 39'; Ott 39'

Olympic Sports Complex, Minsk
Referee: Ingilab Mammadov (Azerbaijan)
25 June 2019
19:30

Romania	1–6	Belarus
Răvoiu 18'	Report	Bryshtsel 13'; Samsonov 18', 36'; Hapon 24'; Makarevich 31', 34'

Olympic Sports Complex, Minsk
Referee: Vladimir Tashkov (Bulgaria)

26 June 2019
14:00

Portugal	8–2	Romania
Gonçalves 2', 8', 18'; Coimbra 6'; Bê Martins 7'; J. Santos 23'; Belchior 33', 35'	Report	Florea 4'; Răvoiu 35'

Olympic Sports Complex, Minsk
Referee: Łukasz Ostrowski (Poland)
26 June 2019
19:30

Belarus	5–5 (a.e.t.)	Switzerland
Bryshtsel 2' (pen.); Miranovich 5'; Bokach 7'; Ryabko 12'; Savich 36' (pen.)	Report	Wüest 12', 17', 33'; Stankovic 23'; Ott 27'
Penalties
Savich (penalty scored); Bokach (penalty scored); Kanstantsinaiu (penalty missed); Samsonov (penalty scored)	3–2	(penalty scored) Ott; (penalty missed) Wüest; (penalty scored) Stankovic; (penalty missed) Hodel

Olympic Sports Complex, Minsk
Referee: Viktor Listratov (Russia)

27 June 2019
14:00

Switzerland	10–0	Romania
Wüest 4', 30'; Stankovic 11', 17', 25', 27'; Steinemann 11', 28'; Ostgen 18'; Ott 32'	Report

Olympic Sports Complex, Minsk
Referee: Ingilab Mammadov (Azerbaijan)
27 June 2019
19:30

Belarus	3–7	Portugal
Bokach 3'; Samsonov 4', 14' (pen.)	Report	J. Santos 4', 30'; Gonçalves 9', 22'; Léo Martins 10' (pen.); Bê Martins 23'; Belchior 33'

Olympic Sports Complex, Minsk
Referee: Ago Kärtmann (Estonia)

=== Group B ===
Pos	Team	Pld	W	W+	WP	L	GF	GA	GD	Pts	Qualification
1	Spain	3	1	1	0	1	15	15	0	5	Semifinals
2	Ukraine	3	1	0	1	1	11	13	−2	4	Semifinals
3	Italy	3	1	0	0	2	13	12	+1	3 (Note: Italy 4–2 Russia)	5–8th place semifinals
4	Russia	3	1	0	0	2	11	10	+1	3	5–8th place semifinals

Source: Minsk 2019
Notes:
25 June 2019
15:30

Spain	5–4 (a.e.t.)	Russia
Suárez 13', 22', 39'; Llorenç 29'; Cintas 30'	Report	Shishin 14', 25', 30'; Zemskov 32'

Olympic Sports Complex, Minsk
Referee: Sofien Benchabane (France)
25 June 2019
18:00

Ukraine	4–4 (a.e.t.)	Italy
Pachev 18', 33'; Nerush 23'; Medvid 29'	Report	Corosiniti 11' (pen.); Gentilin 18'; Gori 21'; Zurlo 30'
Penalties
Pachev (penalty scored); A. Borsuk (penalty scored); Korniichuk (penalty scored); Medvid (penalty scored)	4–3	(penalty scored) Chiavaro; (penalty scored) Gori; (penalty scored) Zurlo; (penalty missed) Marinai

Olympic Sports Complex, Minsk
Referee: Eduards Borisevičs (Latvia)

26 June 2019
15:00

Italy	4–2	Russia
Corosiniti 7'; Gori 20', 34'; Carpita 29'	Report	Del Mestre 14' (o.g.); Krasheninnikov 16'

Olympic Sports Complex, Minsk
Referee: Vladimir Tashkov (Bulgaria)
26 June 2019
18:00

Spain	4–6	Ukraine
Donaire 14'; Torres 18'; D. Ardil 20'; Nerush 30' (o.g.)	Report	Korniichuk 2'; Zborovskyi 13'; I. Borsuk 20'; Pachev 26', 30'; A. Borsuk 36'

Olympic Sports Complex, Minsk
Referee: Mikhail Prokharau (Belarus)

27 June 2019
15:30

Russia	5–1	Ukraine
V. Kryshanov 15'; Paporotnyi 17'; Zemskov 25'; Shishin 34'; Romanov 34'	Report	Sydorenko 27'

Olympic Sports Complex, Minsk
Referee: Sergio Soares (Portugal)
27 June 2019
18:00

Italy	5–6	Spain
Frainetti 9'; Marinai 21'; Zurlo 24'; Palazzolo 28'; Gori 35' (pen.)	Report	Mayor 21', 35', 36'; Frutos 24'; Llorenç 25'; Suárez 34'

Olympic Sports Complex, Minsk
Referee: Łukasz Ostrowski (Poland)

== Classification matches ==
=== Bracket ===
5–8th place semifinals
28 June
Italy	10
Romania	3
28 June
Belarus	5 (2)
Russia (p)	5 (3)

5th place match
29 June
Italy	4
Russia	3
7th place match
29 June
Romania	2
Belarus	5

=== 5–8th place semifinals ===
28 June 2019
14:00

Italy	10–3	Romania
Marinai 2'; Gori 2', 3', 8' (pen.), 29', 34'; Palmacci 31', 32'; Zurlo 33', 33'	Report	Croitoru 2'; Măciucă 25', 26'

Olympic Sports Complex, Minsk
Referee: Mikhail Prokharau (Belarus)

28 June 2019
15:30

Belarus	5–5 (a.e.t.)	Russia
Ryabko 1'; Kanstantsinau 2'; Piatrouski 11'; Hapon 30'; Savich 32'	Report	N. Kryshanov 11'; Paporotnyi 15', 15' (pen.), 18'; Zemskov 34'
Penalties
Savich (penalty scored); Bokach (penalty missed); Chaikouski (penalty scored)	2–3	(penalty scored) Krasheninnikov; (penalty scored) Paporotnyi; (penalty scored) Shishin

Olympic Sports Complex, Minsk
Referee: Vitalij Gomolko (Lithuania)

=== Seventh place match ===
29 June 2019
13:00

Romania	2–5	Belarus
Vîrtan 5'; Măciucă 15'	Report	Hapon 2', 18'; Samsonov 6'; Miranovich 21'; Kanstantsinau 36'

Olympic Sports Complex, Minsk
Referee: Ago Kärtmann (Estonia)

=== Fifth place match ===
29 June 2019
14:30

Italy	4–3	Russia
Palmacci 17'; Gori 25', 34'; Corosiniti 30'	Report	Zemskov 13'; N. Kryshanov 21'; Paporotnyi 25'

Olympic Sports Complex, Minsk
Referee: Vitalij Gomolko (Lithuania)

== Knockout round ==
=== Bracket ===
Semifinals
28 June
Spain	5
Switzerland	3
28 June
Portugal (a.e.t.)	3
Ukraine	2

Gold medal match
29 June
Spain	3
Portugal	8
Bronze medal match
29 June
Switzerland	5
Ukraine	4

=== Semifinals ===
28 June 2019
19:30

Spain	5–3	Switzerland
S. Ardil 22', 25', 36'; Mayor 26'; Llorenç 27'	Report	Ott 7'; Stankovic 20'; Hodel 28'

Olympic Sports Complex, Minsk
Referee: Eduards Borisevičs (Latvia)

28 June 2019
18:00

Portugal	3–2 (a.e.t.)	Ukraine
Madjer 4'; Coimbra 27'; Léo Martins 39'	Report	Korniichuk 8'; Zavorotnyi 16' (pen.)

Olympic Sports Complex, Minsk
Referee: Sofien Benchabane (France)

=== Bronze medal match ===
29 June 2019
17:00

Switzerland	5–4	Ukraine
Ott 8'; Jaeggy 23'; Stankovic 30', 35'; Spaccarotella 33'	Report	A. Borsuk 5', 22'; Makeiev 24'; I. Borsuk 33'

Olympic Sports Complex, Minsk
Referee: Viktor Listratov (Russia)

=== Gold medal match ===
29 June 2019
18:30

Spain	3–8	Portugal
Llorenç 2'; Torres 7'; Mayor 33'	Report	Bê Martins 15', 32'; Léo Martins 17', 22', 26'; Andrade 24'; Madjer 25'; J. Santos 31'

Olympic Sports Complex, Minsk
Referee: Gionni Matticoli (Italy)

== Final standings ==
Pos	Grp	Team	Pld	W	W+	WP	L	GF	GA	GD	Pts
1st place, gold medalist(s)	A	Portugal	5	3	1	0	1	27	13	+14	11
2nd place, silver medalist(s)	B	Spain	5	2	1	0	2	23	26	−3	8
3rd place, bronze medalist(s)	A	Switzerland	5	2	1	0	2	26	15	+11	8
4	B	Ukraine	5	1	0	1	3	17	21	−4	4
5	B	Italy	5	3	0	0	2	27	18	+9	9
6	B	Russia	5	1	0	1	3	19	19	0	4
7	A	Belarus (H)	5	2	0	1	2	24	20	+4	7
8	A	Romania	5	0	0	0	5	8	39	−31	0

(H) Host
