= Beach soccer at the 2015 European Games =

Tournament details
- Host country: Azerbaijan
- Dates: 24–28 June
- Teams: 8 (from 1 confederation)
- Venue(s): Beach Arena, Baku

Final positions
- Champions: Russia (1st title)
- Runners-up: Italy
- Third place: Portugal
- Fourth place: Switzerland

Tournament statistics
- Matches played: 20
- Goals scored: 152 (7.6 per match)
- Top scorer(s): (Portugal) Nuno Belchior (8 goals)

The beach soccer tournament at the Baku 2015 European Games was held from 24 to 28 June. It was the first edition of beach soccer at the European Games.

Eight men's teams, comprising 96 athletes, competed over five days of the competition.

== Medal summary ==
Event	Gold	Silver	Bronze
Men	Russia; Andrey Bukhlitskiy; Yury Gorchinskiy; Yuri Krasheninnikov; Ilya Leonov; Aleksey Makarov; Ivan Ostrovskii; Artur Paporotnyi; Anatoly Peremitin; Kirill Romanov; Egor Shaykov; Dmitry Shishin; Anton Shkarin	Italy; Francesco Corosiniti; Alessio Frainetti; Gabriele Gori; Simone Marinai; Matteo Marrucci; Simone Del Mestre; Michele Di Palma; Paolo Palmacci; Giuseppe Platania; Dario Ramacciotti; Stefano Spada; Emmanuele Zurlo	Portugal; Elinton Andrade; Tiago Batalha; Nuno Belchior; Alan Cavalcanti; Rui Coimbra; Zé Maria; Bruno Novo; Tiago Petrony; Bê Martins; Jordan Santos; Madjer; Bruno Torres

== Qualification ==
Azerbaijan is qualified as host country. The remaining seven teams have qualified through the 2014 Euro Beach Soccer League (EBSL). The top three teams from each group in the Superfinal will qualify. The top team from the Promotional Final, excluding the 12th team from Division A, will also qualify.

Means of qualification	Date of competition	Venue	Berths	Qualified
Host country			1	Azerbaijan
2014 Euro Beach Soccer League Superfinal	17 August 2014	(Spain) Torredembarra	6	Russia; Spain; Portugal; Switzerland; Italy; Ukraine
2014 Euro Beach Soccer League Promotional Final	17 August 2014	(Spain) Torredembarra	1	Hungary
Total			8	

== Group round ==
=== Group A ===
Pos	Team	Pld	W	W+	WP	L	GF	GA	GD	Pts	Qualification
1	Portugal	3	2	1	0	0	17	13	+4	8	Semifinals
2	Switzerland	3	2	0	0	1	17	14	+3	6	Semifinals
3	Ukraine	3	1	0	0	2	11	11	0	3	5–8th place semifinals
4	Azerbaijan (H)	3	0	0	0	3	9	16	−7	0	5–8th place semifinals

Source: Baku2015^{[usurped]}
(H) Host
24 June 2015
17:30

Portugal	6–5	Switzerland
Madjer 8'; Belchior 14', 26', 32'; Fonseca 22', 31'	Report	Stankovic 2', 7' (pen.); M. Jaeggy 15'; Ott 17', 32'

Beach Arena, Baku
Referee: Gionni Matticoli (Italy)
24 June 2015
20:30

Ukraine	3–1	Azerbaijan
Zborovskyi 9'; Korniichuk 17', 22'	Report	Allahguliyev 14'

Beach Arena, Baku
Referee: Laurynas Aržuolaitis (Lithuania)

25 June 2015
17:30

Portugal	5–4 (a.e.t.)	Ukraine
Belchior 2', 32'; Coimbra 24'; J. Santos 25'; B. Santos 38'	Report	I. Borsuk 14'; Pachev 15', 22'; Korniichuk 20'

Beach Arena, Baku
Referee: Amin Utulu (Malta)
25 June 2015
20:30

Azerbaijan	4–7	Switzerland
Aliyev 15' (pen.); Mammadov 20'; Z. Zeynalov 20'; Allahguliyev 28'	Report	M. Jaeggy 3', 9'; Hodel 8'; Spaccarotella 13'; Ott 20', 36'; Lutz 33'

Beach Arena, Baku
Referee: Łukasz Ostrowski (Poland)

26 June 2015
17:30

Switzerland	5–4	Ukraine
Lutz 21'; Stankovic 24' (pen.); Ott 26'; M. Jaeggy 27'; Borer 30'	Report	I. Borsuk 1', 15'; Budzko 2'; Zborovskyi 12'

Beach Arena, Baku
Referee: Laurynas Aržuolaitis (Lithuania)
26 June 2015
20:30

Azerbaijan	4–6	Portugal
A. Zeynalov 3', 8'; Allahguliyev 4'; Aliyev 33'	Report	Torres 14'; Madjer 23', 28', 36'; Fonseca 29', 35'

Beach Arena, Baku
Referee: Gionni Matticoli (Italy)

=== Group B ===
Pos	Team	Pld	W	W+	WP	L	GF	GA	GD	Pts	Qualification
1	Italy	3	2	0	0	1	12	9	+3	6 (Note: Russia 4–6 Italy)	Semifinals
2	Russia	3	2	0	0	1	14	12	+2	6	Semifinals
3	Spain	3	1	0	1	1	9	8	+1	4	5–8th place semifinals
4	Hungary	3	0	0	0	3	9	15	−6	0	5–8th place semifinals

Source: Baku2015^{[usurped]}
Notes:
24 June 2015
16:00

Spain	1–1 (a.e.t.)	Italy
Gómez 34'	Report	Zurlo 10'
Penalties
Gómez (penalty scored); Martin (penalty scored); Mayor (penalty scored)	3–1	(penalty missed) Ramacciotti; (penalty scored) Corosiniti

Beach Arena, Baku
Referee: Ingilab Mammadov (Azerbaijan)
24 June 2015
19:00

Hungary	3–5	Russia
Badalik 26'; Ughy 33'; Ábel 33'	Report	Krasheninnikov 14'; Paporotnyi 20'; Shishin 28', 36'; Makarov 34'

Beach Arena, Baku
Referee: Oleg Cebotari (Moldova)

25 June 2015
16:00

Spain	5–2	Hungary
Ardil 17'; Gómez 25'; Martin 26'; Cintas 29'; Mayor 34'	Report	Ábel 12'; Simonyi 13'

Beach Arena, Baku
Referee: Yeliz Topaloğlu (Turkey)
25 June 2015
19:00

Russia	4–6	Italy
Shkarin 6'; Krasheninnikov 23'; Shaykov 25'; Makarov 34'	Report	Zurlo 6'; Corosiniti 25'; Gori 29', 30'; Frainetti 30'; Palmacci 33'

Beach Arena, Baku
Referee: Sofien Benchabane (France)

26 June 2015
16:00

Italy	5–4	Hungary
Gori 1', 34'; Corosiniti 21'; Marrucci 22'; Zurlo 32'	Report	Fekete 12', 18'; Sebestyén 17' (pen.), 29'

Beach Arena, Baku
Referee: Oleg Cebotari (Moldova)
26 June 2015
19:00

Russia	5–3	Spain
Krasheninnikov 9'; Gómez 10' (o.g.); Shaykov 10'; Shishin 33'; Paporotnyi 35'	Report	Gómez 1', 19'; Mayor 8' (pen.)

Beach Arena, Baku
Referee: Antonio Pereira (Portugal)

== Classification matches ==
=== Bracket ===
5–8th place semifinals
27 June
Ukraine	4
Hungary	2
27 June
Spain	3
Azerbaijan	1

5th place match
28 June
Ukraine	3
Spain	6
7th place match
28 June
Hungary	3
Azerbaijan	2

=== 5–8th place semifinals ===
27 June 2015
16:00

Ukraine	4–2	Hungary
Illichov 11', 27'; A. Borsuk 19', 35'	Report	Ughy 1'; Berkes 10'

Beach Arena, Baku
Referee: Mikhail Prokharau (Belarus)

27 June 2015
17:30

Spain	3–1	Azerbaijan
Gómez 16'; Mayor 25'; Ardil 29'	Report	Allahguliyev 35'

Beach Arena, Baku
Referee: Yeliz Topaloğlu (Turkey)

=== Seventh place match ===
28 June 2015
14:30

Hungary	3–2	Azerbaijan
Fekete 4'; Simonyi 15', 23'	Report	Guliyev 17' (pen.); Allahguliyev 36'

Beach Arena, Baku
Referee: Richard de Bruijn (Netherlands)

=== Fifth place match ===
28 June 2015
16:00

Ukraine	3–6	Spain
I. Borsuk 20'; Korniichuk 22'; A. Borsuk 27'	Report	Pajón 4'; Carrera 12'; Gómez 14'; Ardil 22'; Alvarado 24'; Mayor 26'

Beach Arena, Baku
Referee: Mikhail Prokharau (Belarus)

== Knockout round ==
=== Bracket ===
Semifinals
27 June
Italy	7
Switzerland	4
27 June
Portugal	1
Russia	2

Gold medal match
28 June
Italy	2
Russia	3
Bronze medal match
28 June
Switzerland	5
Portugal	6

=== Semifinals ===
27 June 2015
19:00

Italy	7–4	Switzerland
Marinai 3', 21'; Ramacciotti 5'; M. Jaeggy 16' (o.g.); Gori 21', 32'; Zurlo 23'	Report	Borer 11'; Stankovic 16' (pen.), 25', 35'

Beach Arena, Baku
Referee: Ago Kärtmann (Estonia)

27 June 2015
20:30

Portugal	1–2	Russia
Fonseca 18'	Report	Paporotnyi 14', 35'

Beach Arena, Baku
Referee: Amin Utulu (Malta)

=== Bronze medal match ===
28 June 2015
14:30

Switzerland	5–6	Portugal
Borer 14', 28' (pen.); Spaccarotella 22'; M. Jaeggy 28'; Ott 29'	Report	Belchior 8', 32', 32'; Torres 14'; J. Santos 21'; Alan 22'

Beach Arena, Baku
Referee: Gionni Matticoli (Italy)

=== Gold medal match ===
28 June 2015
16:00

Italy	2–3	Russia
Gori 26'; Frainetti 30' (pen.)	Report	Shaykov 6'; Gorchinskiy 7'; Leonov 16'

Beach Arena, Baku
Referee: Sofien Benchabane (France)
