= Emmanuele Zurlo =

Italian beach soccer player (born 1988)

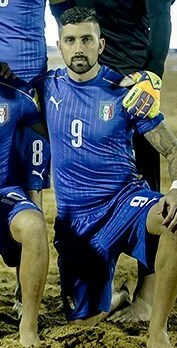
- Zurlo in 2017.

Personal information
- Full name: Emmanuele Zurlo
- Date of birth: 7 February 1988 (age 38)
- Place of birth: Catanzaro, Italy
- Height: 1.73 m (5 ft 8 in)
- Position: Forward

International career^{‡}
Years	Team	Apps	(Gls)
2013–	Italy	152	(142)
- ‡ National team caps and goals as of 15 May 2023

Emmanuele Zurlo (born 7 February 1988) is an Italian beach soccer player who plays as a forward for the Italy national team.

== Career ==
Zurlo originally pursued a career in association football, reaching Serie C2 with US Catanzaro 1929.

He began his transition to beach soccer in 2011 when he began playing in the Italian National League (Serie A). In 2013, he was the second top scorer in the league and top scorer in the Coppa Italia. He was subsequently called up to the Italy national team for the first time for a friendly versus Iran in August of that year. His competitive debut came at Stage 1 of the 2014 Euro Beach Soccer League (EBSL); his performances during the season earnt him a nomination for the Pallone Azzurro (Blue Ball).

In 2015, he attended his first World Cup, and has since been part of the Italian squads at three further editions (2017, 2019, 2014). He was top scorer of Serie A in back-to-back seasons in 2016 and 2017, and was named as the league's MVP in 2018 whilst playing for club side Catania. He successfully converted his penalty in the shootout win versus Spain in the final of the 2018 EBSL to help seal Italy's first European title in 13 years.

At the 2019 World Cup, he won the Silver Boot award with 10 goals, was shortlisted for the Golden Ball, and his first goal versus Switzerland was voted as the best of the tournament as he played a crucial role in Italy's run to the final. It was also in 2019 when Zurlo made his 100th appearance for Italy in a 4–3 win versus Russia at the European Games in Minsk, and he scored his 100th goal at the World Beach Games in Doha.

In 2023, Italy coach, Emiliano Del Duca, revamped the national team, purging it of some veteran players. However, Zurlo's services were retained and he was promoted to team captain; in this role, he was flag bearer for Italy at the opening ceremony of the 2023 Mediterranean Beach Games, and he led Italy to a third European crown at the 2023 EBSL, being one of just two surviving squad members from the previous title win five years prior.

== Statistics ==
Competition	Year	Apps	Goals	Ref.
FIFA Beach Soccer World Cup
FIFA Beach Soccer World Cup	(Portugal) 2015	6	7	
FIFA Beach Soccer World Cup	(The Bahamas) 2017	4	2	
FIFA Beach Soccer World Cup	(Paraguay) 2019	6	10	
FIFA Beach Soccer World Cup	(United Arab Emirates) 2024			
Total		16	19	—

== Honours ==
The following is a selection, not an exhaustive list, of the major international honours Zurlo has achieved:

=== Team ===
- FIFA Beach Soccer World Cup
  - Runner-up (1): 2019
  - Fourth place (2): 2015, 2017
- Euro Beach Soccer League
  - Winner (2): 2018, 2023
- Mediterranean Beach Games
  - Gold medal (2): 2015, 2019
- European Games
  - Silver medal (2): 2015, 2023
- UEFA qualifiers for the FIFA Beach Soccer World Cup
  - Runner-up (1): 2019
- Euro Winners Cup
  - Runner-up (1): 2015
- World Winners Cup
  - Winner (1): 2023

=== Individual ===
- FIFA Beach Soccer World Cup (2):
  - Silver Boot: 2019
  - Goal of the tournament: 2019
- Euro Beach Soccer League (1):
  - Superfinal:
    - Top scorer: 2019
- Mediterranean Beach Games (1):
  - Top scorer: 2019
