= Yeliz Topaloğlu =

Turkish FIFA-listed football referee (born 1978)

- Born: January 1, 1978 (age 48); Eyüp, Istanbul, Turkey
- Other occupation: Teacher

Domestic
Years	League	Role
2002–	Women's First	referee
2009–	Women's Second	referee
2010–	Regional Youth Development	referee
2014–	Women's Third	referee

International
Years	League	Role
2014–	Euro Beach Soccer	beach soccer referee

Yeliz Topaloğlu (born January 1, 1978) is a Turkish FIFA-listed football referee. Outside of refereeing, she is a teacher of physical education. She is FIFA-listed to referee beach soccer, the first woman to be licensed as such.

== Early years ==
Yeliz Topaloğlu was born in 1978. She was raised in Eyüp district of Istanbul, Turkey. In 2000, she entered Marmara University to study physical education and sports. After graduating in 2004, she began to work as a physical education and sports teacher.

Topaloğlu played tennis, football, and basketball during her university years. She had to retire from active sports, however, because of an injury. She decided to pursue a career as a basketball referee, and applied for the required course. At the same time, her older sister, who wanted to be a football referee, was rejected due to exceeding the age limit. She named Yeliz instead on the application. Yeliz' career as a football referee began as a surprise.

== Football referee ==
=== Domestic ===
Topaloğlu began her referee career in 1999, officially debuting as an assistant referee in a Women's League match played on December 29, 2001. On February 9, 2002, she was appointed referee in the Women's League, which was the forerunner of the Turkish Women's First Football League. She served in various refereeing roles for youth leagues for boys in several different age categories. She officiated men's A2 League, Regional Amateur League, TFF Third League, and TFF Second League matches as assistant referee. She is also referee at all three women's leagues.

=== International ===
On April 4, 2014, she served as the fourth official at the 2015 FIFA Women's World Cup qualification match between the national teams of Turkey and Wales.

The Turkish Football Federation applied to FIFA to list Topaloğlu as a beach soccer referee, a sport that only has men's competitions. FIFA replied that they would agree if Yeliz could pass the required courses. She became the world's first female beach soccer referee after meeting all the FIFA requirements.

Her first international appointment as beach soccer referee was at State 1 of the 2014 Euro Beach Soccer League, held in Catania, Italy between June 20 and 22. In 2015, she officiated beach soccer matches at the 2015 European Games in Baku, Azerbaijan from June 24 to 28, the 2015 Euro Beach Soccer League in Siófok, Hungary between August 7–9, as well as at the 2015 Mediterranean Beach Games in Pescara, Italy between August 28 and September 6,

== Other sportive activities ==
Topaloğlu is a second stage fitness instructor and has a CMAS Two Star Diver certificate.
