= Llorenç Gómez =

Spanish beach soccer player

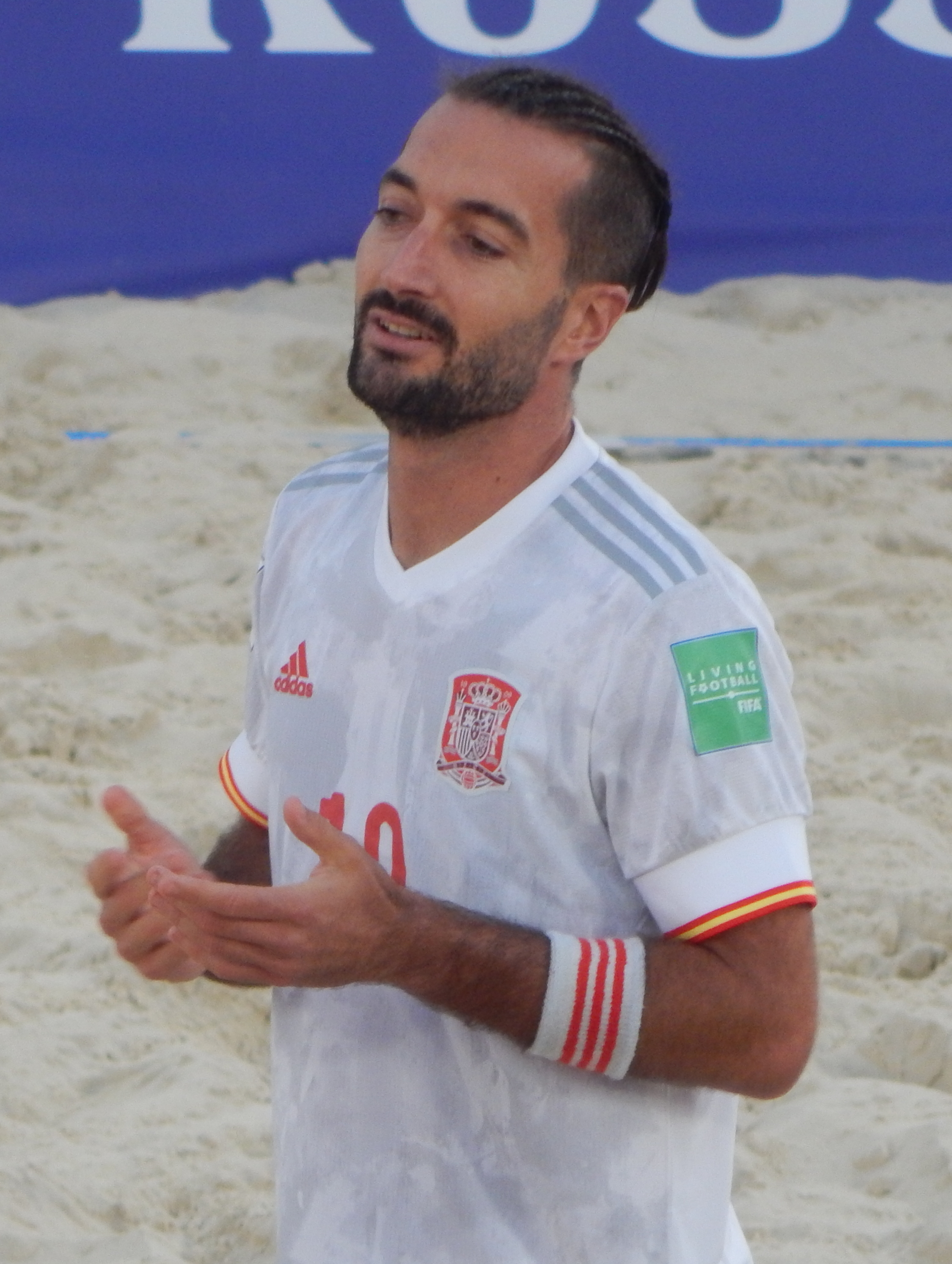
- Llorenç at the 2021 World Cup.

Personal information
- Full name: Llorenç Gómez León
- Date of birth: 3 November 1991 (age 34)
- Place of birth: Sant Cugat del Vallès, Spain
- Height: 1.80 m (5 ft 11 in)
- Position: Forward

International career
Years	Team	Apps	(Gls)
2011–2021	Spain	168	(207)

Managerial career
- 2023–: Denmark
Note: Only national teams are shown.

Llorenç Gómez León (born 3 November 1991), often known simply as Llorenç, is a Spanish former beach soccer player who played as a forward. He represented Spain at the FIFA Beach Soccer World Cup in 2013, 2015 and 2021. Llorenç was considered as one of the best players in the world during his career and one of the best Spanish players ever, having won the world's best player award at the 2018 Beach Soccer Stars awards ceremony.

He retired from the sport prematurely in September 2021, aged just 29, citing chronic injuries. He was close to 1000 career goals at the time of his retirement. As of 2023, he is head coach of Denmark.

== Career ==
Llorenç took up association football aged five and developed aspirations of becoming a professional player. At age 13, he joined the youth academy of Gimnàstic de Tarragona. Llorenç subsequently began suffering knee problems at the age of 16, ultimately resulting in a diagnosis of osteoarthritis and the need for multiple operations. He was advised to train on sand as part of his rehabilitation as the surface is low-impact on knees; this is where Llorenç first encountered beach soccer. He developed a liking for the derivative and took it up as a hobby. Aged 19, he was told to abandon his desire of becoming a footballer because of his medical condition.

Thus, Llorenç began to pursue beach soccer more seriously; he experienced a rapid rise through the ranks. After joining his local club in Torredembarra, he was soon selected for the Catalonian regional team. It was playing for the latter where Llorenç was spotted by coach Joaquín Alonso and called up to the Spanish national team. He debuted at the second stage of the 2011 Euro Beach Soccer League, and from there quickly established himself as part of the squad. In 2013, he took the number 10 shirt from the recently retired Amarelle and helped Spain to a runners-up finish at the 2013 FIFA Beach Soccer World Cup, scoring his country's only goal in the final. In 2014, he was nominated as one of the world's best three players of the year and was part of the team of the year at the Beach Soccer Stars awards ceremony; FIFA.com too called Llorenç a "emerging star" of the sport. He also won the award for best goal of the year.

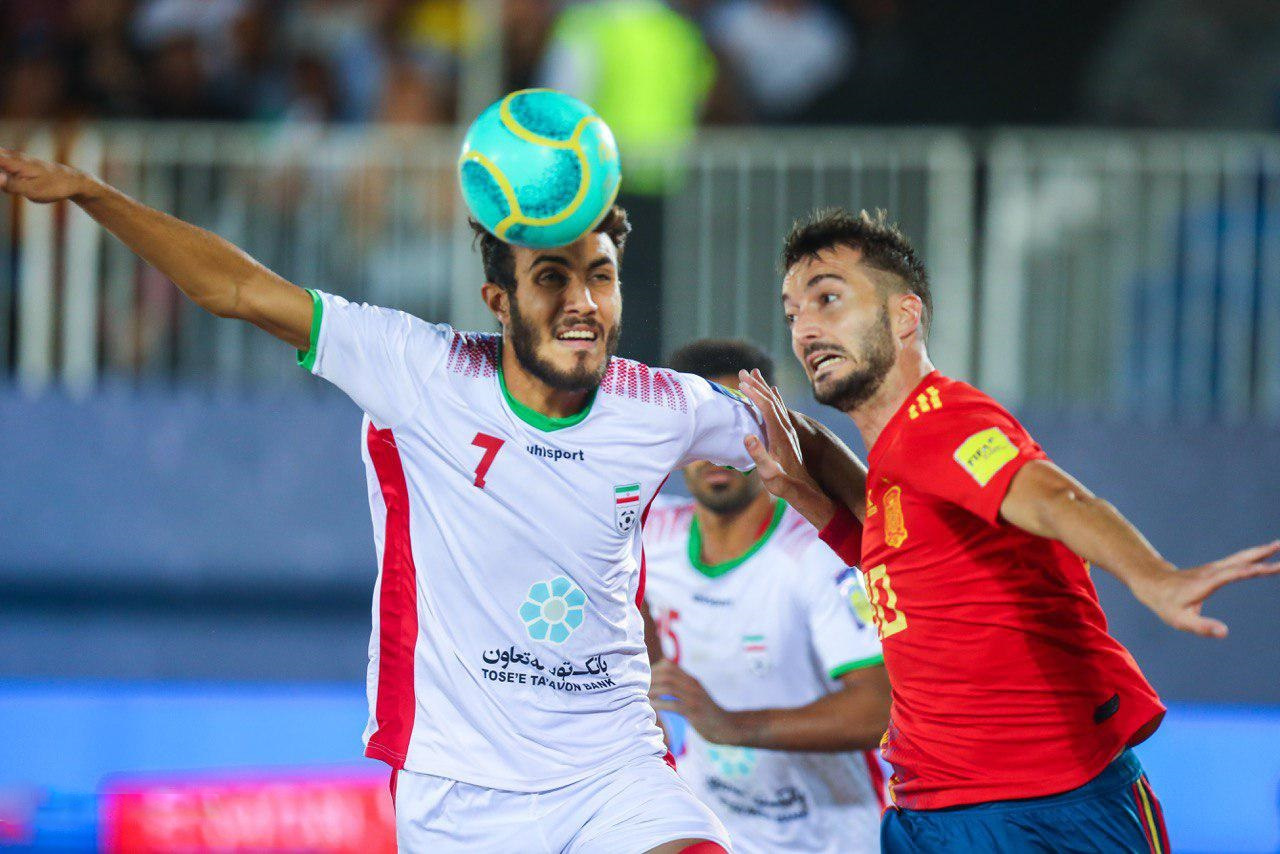
Llorenç playing for Spain, battling for the ball vs. Iran at the 2019 Intercontinental Cup

As well as continuing to represent Spain, in order to make a full living from the sport, he has also played for numerous club sides in leagues around the world as a sought after player. Major clubs include Barcelona (Spain), Kristall (Russia), Lokomotiv Moscow (Russia), Flamengo (Brazil), KP Łódź (Poland), Falfala Kfar Qassem (Israel), Tokyo Verdy (Japan), Catania (Italy) and Artur Music (Ukraine). He tasted international success in the 2015 Mundialito de Clubes, 2015 Euro Winners Cup, 2017 Mundialito de Clubes and 2019 World Winners Cup with each of the first four clubs respectively.

He regularly won top scorer and best player awards at the events in which he played; he accumulated over 40 individual awards in his career.

In 2018, Llorenç was named as the best beach soccer player in the world at the Beach Soccer Stars awards, ahead of Brazilians, Bruno Xavier and Datinha. The commendation was presented to him by his former teammate and idol, Amarelle. He collected the award on crutches, having fractured his metatarsal at the Intercontinental Cup.

Llorenç's third appearance at the World Cup, in 2021, was marred by injury and a red card in Spain's second match versus Tahiti. A month later, in a shock announcement on social media and still shy of 30 years old, he declared that he was retiring from beach soccer due to the "degenerative" nature of his injuries and the need to prioritise his quality of life. Within a fortnight of his retirement, he was named as the new head coach of the Catalonia regional team. After a successful campaign as coach of San Javier in the 2022 Women's Euro Winners Cup, Llorenç was then appointed as head coach of Denmark men's national team in 2023 following fruitful negotiations with captain Casper Dorph. Llorenç has also founded his own annual youth beach soccer tournament, the "Llorenç Beach Soccer Cup", with the backing of Beach Soccer Worldwide (BSWW).

== Style of play ==
Llorenç was known for his finishing ability, technical skills and natural ability at bicycle kicks. He was a forward but known to be versatile and so could play in any outfield position if required. Fellow Spanish teammate, Dona, says that Llorenç will shoot and score when least expected and will always perform when his team need him to the most. He claims to have "learnt everything" about beach soccer from Amarelle. He has also been compared to Ronaldinho. Llorenç is left-footed.

== Personal life ==
Llorenç was born in Sant Cugat del Vallès but has lived in Torredembarra since he was seven years old. He has three sisters, and as of 2019, a total of seven nephews and nieces. Ronaldinho was his childhood idol. He can speak five languages and can play the guitar. He is well known for his exuberance and positive, philosophical outlook towards life.

He studied to be a "Senior Sports Physical Activities Technician" and holds a UEFA A Licence. In addition, Llorenç owns his own sports brand, "Enzo10", and was signed with adidas.

Llorenç supports RCD Espanyol and received a special reception from club in 2013 after Spain's second-place finish at the World Cup.

== Statistics ==
Country

Team	Year	Euro League		World Cup		WC qual.		Other (Note: Includes Intercontinental Cup, World Beach Games, World Beach Games qualification, European Games, BSWW Mundialito, Euro Beach Soccer Cup, and BSWW Tour events.)		Total		Ref.
Team	Year	Apps	Goals	Apps	Goals	Apps	Goals	Apps	Goals	Apps	Goals	Ref.
Spain
Spain	2011	3	1	—		—		—		3	1	
Spain	2012	9	10	—		—		3	4	12	14	
Spain	2013	9	15	5	4	—		11	14	25	33	
Spain	2014	9	27	—		7	7	4	8	20	42	
Spain	2015	7	11	3	2	—		5	6	15	19	
Spain	2016	3	3	—		8	10	5	3	16	16	
Spain	2017	10	11	—		—		3	4	13	15	
Spain	2018	10	15	—		—		12	18	22	33	
Spain	2019	7	2	—		6	5	19	18	32	25	
Spain	2020	No matches due to the COVID-19 pandemic.										
Spain	2021	3	4	3	1	4	4	—		10	9	
Total		70	99	11	7	25	26	62	75	168	207	—

Club

Tournament	Year	Club	Apps	Goals	Ref.
Euro Winners Cup
Euro Winners Cup	(Italy) 2013	(Italy) Terracina	6	11	
Euro Winners Cup	(Italy) 2014	(Italy) Terracina	4	11	
Euro Winners Cup	(Italy) 2015	(Russia) Kristall	7	10	
Euro Winners Cup	(Portugal) 2017	(Georgia (country)) Dinamo Batumi	7	7	
Euro Winners Cup	(Portugal) 2018	(Israel) Falfala Kfar Qassem	6	16	
Euro Winners Cup	(Portugal) 2019	(Russia) Lokomotiv Moscow	7	7	
Euro Winners Cup	(Portugal) 2020	(Ukraine) Artur Music	7	22	
Euro Winners Cup	(Portugal) 2021	(Spain) San Francisco	6	7	
Total			50	91	—

== Honours ==
The following is a selection, not an exhaustive list, of the major honours Llorenç has achieved:

=== Country ===
- FIFA Beach Soccer World Cup
  - Runner-up (1): 2013
- Euro Beach Soccer League
  - Runner-up (2): 2014, 2018
  - Third place (1): 2019
- Intercontinental Cup
  - Runner-up (1): 2019
- European Games:
  - Silver medal (1): 2019
- Euro Beach Soccer Cup:
  - Winner (1): 2014
- Mundialito:
  - Winner (1): 2013
  - Runner-up (1): 2018

=== Club ===
==== National ====
Leagues won

- Liga Nacional (Spain): 2012
- Superliga (Russia): 2015
- Swiss League: 2017
- Ekstraklasa (Poland): 2017
- Campeonato Elite (Portugal): 2017
- JFA League (Japan): 2018
- Liga Carioca (Brazil): 2019

Cups won

- Copa Italiana (Italy): 2012
- Russian Cup: 2015
- Polish Cup: 2018

==== International ====
- Euro Winners Cup:
  - Winner (1): 2015
- Mundialito de Clubes
  - Winner (2): 2015, 2017
- World Winners Cup
  - Winner (1): 2019
- Copa Libertadores
  - Runner-up (1): 2017

=== Individual ===
- Beach Soccer Stars (5):
  - World's best player: 2018
  - World's top 3 best players: 2014
  - World dream team: 2014, 2018
  - Goal of the year: 2014
- Euro Beach Soccer League (9):
  - Superfinal:
    - Best player: 2018
    - Top scorer: 2014
  - Regular season stages:
    - Best player: 2012(1), 2017(1)
    - Top scorer: 2012(1), 2013(1), 2014(1), 2017(1), 2018(1)
- Mundialito (1):
  - Top scorer: 2013
- World Beach Games qualification (1):
  - Best player: 2019
- Euro Winners Cup (2):
  - Top scorer: 2018, 2020
- Liga Nacional (Spain; 4):
  - Best player: 2012
  - Top scorer: 2012, 2013, 2017
- Superliga (Russia; 3):
  - Best player: 2017 (stage 1), 2018
  - Top scorer: 2018
- Ekstraklasa (Poland; 2):
  - Top scorer: 2018, 2020
- JFA League (Japan; 1):
  - Top scorer: 2018
- Liga Carioca (Brazil; 2):
  - Best player: 2019
  - Top scorer: 2019
