= Paolo Palmacci =

Italian beach soccer player

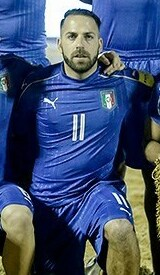
- Palmacci at a BSWW Tour event in 2017.

Personal information
- Full name: Paolo Palmacci
- Date of birth: 17 May 1984 (age 42)
- Place of birth: Latina, Italy
- Height: 1.71 m (5 ft 7 in)
- Position: Midfielder

Senior career*
Years	Team	Apps	(Gls)
2005–2016	Terracina		
2017–2019	Catania		
2021–	Napoli		

International career^{‡}
2006–	Italy	282	(229)
Note: Only domestic clubs are shown.
- * Club domestic league appearances and goals ‡ National team caps and goals as of 27 June 2021

Paolo Palmacci (born 17 May 1984), is an Italian beach soccer player who plays as a midfielder, having originally started as a forward.

He has appeared at eight editions of the FIFA Beach Soccer World Cup representing the Italy national team, earning a silver medal on two occasions (2008 and 2019), and, as of 2023, is the most-capped Italian player ever.

== Career ==
Palmacci began playing football aged six; he originally pursued professional association football, making appearances in both Serie D and Serie C1. In 2003, aged 19, he started playing beach soccer, in his hometown of Terracina.

=== Club ===
In 2005, Palmacci began competing for Terracina's beach soccer club in the LND Serie A, Italy's national beach soccer league.

He was Serie A's second top scorer in the 2010 and 2011 seasons; in the latter, he won the domestic treble with the club (league, cup and super cup). In 2015, he was awarded as the best player of the Serie A season. In total, he won nine trophies with Terracina, scoring 196 goals. After 11 years with the club, Palmacci made a "shock" move to rival club Catania in 2017. He won another three trophies with the club before moving to Napoli in 2021.

As of 2023, he has registered goals in 18 consecutive league seasons, totalling over 300, second on the all-time scorers list behind Gabriele Gori. That year, he was named a "Legend of Serie A Beach Soccer" by LND.

=== International ===
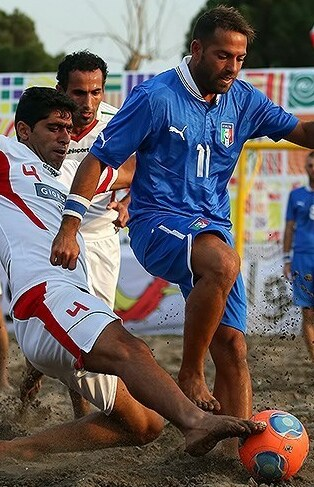
Palmacci during a friendly match vs. Iran in 2013.

Palmacci was first called up to the Italy national team in 2006, aged 22, for an exhibition tournament in Réunion. He was subsequently a surprise inclusion in Italy's final 12-man squad for the 2006 FIFA Beach Soccer World Cup a month later.

At the 2008 World Cup, he scored his self-proclaimed favourite ever beach soccer goal, an overhead kick in the quarter-final victory over France. Italy reached their first World Cup final at said edition, and he scored one of his team's three goals in the defeat against Brazil.

Palmacci survived new Italy head coach Massimiliano Esposito's purging of the squad in 2010 to find himself as one of the most experienced members of the national team come the time of the 2011 FIFA Beach Soccer World Cup; he was Italy's top scorer at the tournament with seven goals.

Palmacci became Italy's all-time record appearance maker at the 2015 European Games in Baku, overtaking the previous holder Michele Leghissa's 162 caps. A few weeks later at the 2015 World Cup in Espinho, Portugal, he infamously missed the crucial spotkick in the penalty shootout loss against Tahiti in the semi-final.

At the 2017 World Cup qualifiers in September 2016, Palmacci reached 189 goals for his country, becoming Italy's all-time record goalscorer, surpassing Roberto Pasquali. He also made his 200th appearance for Italy at the tournament, against Poland in the semi-finals. He held the scoring record for two and a half years until he relinquished it to Gabriele Gori. In 2017, Palmacci reached the milestone of 200 goals for Italy in an 11–4 victory against Ukraine during the Superfinal of the Euro Beach Soccer League.

In 2018, he scored Italy's last penalty of the shootout win versus Spain in the final of the Euro Beach Soccer League to help seal the title, the biggest of Palmacci's international career. In 2019, he was one of just two surviving Italian players to play in the World Cup final against Portugal, having also played Italy's only previous final in 2008. Palmacci's final appearance to date for Italy came during the team's unsuccessful World Cup qualifying campaign in June 2021.

== Style of play ==
Palmacci has been described as "agile and quick, with great acrobatic skills... the prototype of the ideal beach soccer striker."

== Statistics ==
Competition	Year	Apps	Goals	Ref.
FIFA Beach Soccer World Cup	(Brazil) 2006	3	1	
FIFA Beach Soccer World Cup	(Brazil) 2007	3	3	
FIFA Beach Soccer World Cup	(France) 2008	6	5	
FIFA Beach Soccer World Cup	(United Arab Emirates) 2009	4	3	
FIFA Beach Soccer World Cup	(Italy) 2011	4	7	
FIFA Beach Soccer World Cup	(Portugal) 2015	6	4	
FIFA Beach Soccer World Cup	(The Bahamas) 2017	5	5	
FIFA Beach Soccer World Cup	(Paraguay) 2019	6	0	
Total		37	28	—

== Honours ==
As of 2019 season

The following is a selection, not an exhaustive list, of the major honours Palmacci has achieved with Italy:

=== Team ===
- FIFA Beach Soccer World Cup
  - Runner-up (2): 2008, 2019
- Euro Beach Soccer League
  - Winner (1): 2018
  - Runner-up (1): 2010
- Mediterranean Beach Games
  - Gold medal (1): 2015
- European Games
  - Silver medal (1): 2015
- UEFA qualifiers for the FIFA Beach Soccer World Cup:
  - Runner-up (1): 2019

=== Individual ===
- Euro Beach Soccer League (6):
  - Superfinal:
    - Top scorer: 2009, 2016
  - Regular season stages:
    - Top scorer: 2009 x1, 2012 x1
    - Best player: 2012 x1, 2019 x1
