= Gabriele Gori (beach soccer) =

Italian beach soccer player

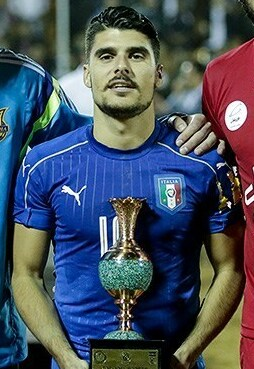
- Gori in 2017.

Personal information
- Date of birth: 12 October 1987 (age 39)
- Place of birth: Viareggio, Italy
- Height: 1.70 m (5 ft 7 in)
- Position: Forward

Senior career*
Years	Team	Apps	(Gls)
2006–2007	Pisa (football)		
2008	Lucchese (football)		
2010–2020	Viareggio	90	(204)
2021–2022	Catania		
2023	Pisa BS		
2024–	Viareggio		

International career^{‡}
2010–	Italy	193	(340)
- * Club domestic league appearances and goals ‡ National team caps and goals as of 11 September 2022

Gabriele Gori (born 10 October 1987) is an Italian beach soccer player who plays as a forward.

Known for his agility in scoring bicycle kicks, he won the top scorer award at the 2017 and 2019 editions of the FIFA Beach Soccer World Cup, and becoming the all-time top scorer of the Italy national team.

== Career ==
=== International ===
Gori originally played association football professionally, reaching as high as Serie C including two clubs between 2006 and 2008. However, injuries prevented his football career from advancing further.

In 2010, Gori was invited by a friend to play beach soccer at a memorial event with the team of his hometown, Viareggio. Gori was sceptical about the sport and only accepted the invitation because of his friend's passion. Despite his reservations, the event went well for Gori and he was invited to continue to play with Viareggio. That summer, the then Italy coach, Massimiliano Esposito, having seen Gori play during the Italian League, called him up for his debut in the national team at the 2010 Euro Beach Soccer League (EBSL) Superfinal in Lisbon, aged 22.

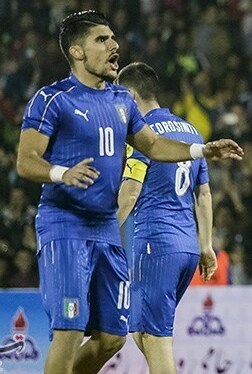
Gori at the 2017 Persian Beach Soccer Cup.

Gori recovered from knee surgery in time to be included in the Italian team for the 2011 FIFA Beach Soccer World Cup on home sand in Ravenna, but suffered at the tournament with a fever. At his next World Cup appearance in 2015, he scored his 100th goal for Italy during the semi-final defeat to Tahiti, ending the tournament as its joint second top scorer. Later that summer, he scored four of Italy's five goals in the gold medal match of the Mediterranean Beach Games versus Egypt, securing Italy's first major honour for ten years. After earning his 100th cap for Italy in September 2016, Gori was then voted as one of the three best players in the world at that year's annual season-ending Beach Soccer Stars awards ceremony and also won the Pallone Azzurro (Blue Ball) award for best Italian player of the year bestowed by the Italian Football Federation. His biggest individual accolade came six months later at the 2017 World Cup, where he won the Golden Boot (top scorer) with 17 goals, and his 12 goals during the 2018 EBSL season helped Italy secure their first European crown in 13 years, the biggest title of Gori's career.

Gori began 2019 by registering his 200th goal for Gli Azzurri in what was his most prolific ever start to a season, during which he overtook Paolo Palmacci to become Italy's all-time top goalscorer. But his season then took a set-back as he missed out on winning Italy's second gold medal at the Mediterranean Beach Games due to injury. However, he returned to end the year with a silver medal at the 2019 World Cup, and won the Golden Boot once again (despite playing with an injured foot), the first player to win consecutive top scorer awards at the World Cup since Madjer in 2005 and 2006. He was also named as one of the tournament's top ten best players, out of the 192 participants. Gori was also once again named one of the world's best three players and named amongst the world dream team for 2019 at the Beach Soccer Stars awards.

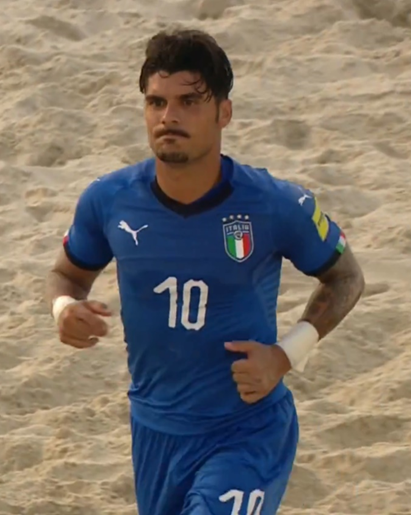
Gori at the 2019 World Cup qualifiers.

After the emergence of the COVID-19 pandemic and its effects on sport, Gori made scathing criticisms of the lack of support for beach soccer from the Italian Football Federation.

He scored his 300th goal for Italy in a 12–0 victory versus Denmark during an ultimately unsuccessful World Cup qualifying campaign in June 2021. Gori's final match of the 2022 season was marred by him receiving a red card after just four minutes of the EBSL encounter versus Spain. He then suffered a "serious" cruciate injury and did not return to fitness until July 2023; his recovery was described as being "slow" by October, and he was subsequently left out of Italy's 18-man shortlist for the 2024 World Cup.

=== Club ===
Domestically, Gori began playing for Viareggio in 2010, appearing alongside childhood friends and fellow national team players Andrea Carpita, Dario Ramacciotti, Simone Marinai, Matteo Marrucci and Michele di Palma. His personal highlight came in the 2016 season when the team won the treble of the Euro Winners Cup (EWC), Coppa Italia and the Italian League; in 2018, he overtook Paolo Palmacci to become the all-time leading goalscorer of the latter, with over 300. It was also playing for Viareggio in 2019 when he scored his most memorable goal in beach soccer, a trademark overhead kick attempt converted from inside his own half which sealed an extra-time victory over Catania in a league match; the goal went notably viral, with Sky Sport Italia describing it as "driving commentators, the public, and the web crazy." Enrico Pace of Lucca in Diretta assessed the goal as, "sci-fi... that will remain in the history of beach soccer."

In 2020, it was announced Gori was leaving Viareggio after 10 years, having played approximately 150 matches and scoring 350 goals for the club in all competitions. He joined Catania on a three-year contract. His link-up with fellow national team striker Emmanuele Zurlo at the club was described "as if a Serie A club could deploy Immobile and Insigne up front." In 2023, he signed a two-year deal with Pisa, but returned to Viareggio in 2024.

He has also had brief stints at the EWC and other international club events for the likes of Braga of Portugal, Artur Music of Ukraine, Boca Gdańsk of Poland and FC City of Russia.

== Style of play ==
Gori is known for being a lethal goal poacher, possessing exceptional technique in executing goals. He is particularly famed for his ability in performing successful bicycle kicks, so much so that he is nicknamed in Italian, "il re delle rovesciate" (English: the king of bicycle kicks). He is also nicknamed, "Tin-Tin".

He studied and modelled his play style off of his beach soccer idol, Amarelle, also known for his acrobatics and overhead kicks.

== Personal life ==
Gori is an estate agent and runs his own business in his hometown (as of 2019). He was formerly a quantity surveyor. At the beginning of his beach soccer career, his father believed he was making a mistake dedicating so much time to the sport. He claims to cope well with balancing work and his beach soccer career but that it has got increasingly difficult. Gori has also fathered a son, Cristian (born December 2017). He supports Juventus.

== Statistics ==
Country

National team	Season	Euro League		World Cup		Other (Note: Includes Intercontinental Cup, World Beach Games, World Beach Games qualification, European Games, Mediterranean Beach Games, Euro Beach Soccer Cup, BSWW Tour events and friendlies.)		Total		Ref.
National team	Season	Apps	Goals	Apps	Goals	Apps	Goals	Apps	Goals	Ref.
Italy
Italy	2010	3	3	—		26	42	56	81	
Italy	2011	—		4	1	26	42	56	81	
Italy	2012	8	10	—		26	42	56	81	
Italy	2013	6	12	—		26	42	56	81	
Italy	2014	9	13	—		26	42	56	81	
Italy	2015	7	12	6	7	10	24	23	43	
Italy	2016	9	7	—		12	30	21	37	
Italy	2017	9	11	6	17	3	5	18	33	
Italy	2018	9	12	—		—		9	12	
Italy	2019	3	4	6	16	30	66	39	86	
Italy	2020	No matches due to the COVID-19 pandemic.								
Italy	2021	7	16	—		8	11	15	27	
Italy	2022	6	9	—		6	12	12	21	
Total		76	109	22	41	95	190	193	340	—

Club

Tournament	Year	Club	Apps	Goals	Ref.
Euro Winners Cup
Euro Winners Cup	(Italy) 2013	(Italy) Viareggio	3	9	
Euro Winners Cup	(Italy) 2015	(Portugal) Braga	7	9	
Euro Winners Cup	(Italy) 2016	(Italy) Viareggio	7	18	
Euro Winners Cup	(Portugal) 2017	(Italy) Viareggio	7	18	
Euro Winners Cup	(Portugal) 2018	(Italy) Viareggio	3	5	
Euro Winners Cup	(Portugal) 2019	(Ukraine) Artur Music	8	26	
Euro Winners Cup	(Portugal) 2020	(Ukraine) Artur Music	7	21	
Total			42	106	—

== Honours ==
As of 2023.

The following is a selection, not an exhaustive list, of the major honours Gori has achieved:

=== Team ===
International

- FIFA Beach Soccer World Cup
  - Runner-up (1): 2019
  - Fourth place (2): 2015, 2017
- Euro Beach Soccer League
  - Winner (1): 2018
  - Runner-up (1): 2010
- Mediterranean Beach Games
  - Gold medal (1): 2015
- European Games
  - Silver medal (1): 2015
- UEFA qualifiers for the FIFA Beach Soccer World Cup
  - Runner-up (1): 2019
- Euro Beach Soccer Cup
  - Runner-up (1): 2016
- Euro Winners Cup
  - Winner (1): 2016

Domestic

- Italian Serie A
  - Winner (1): 2016
  - Runner-up (3): 2012, 2015, 2019
- Coppa Italia
  - Winner (3): 2012, 2016, 2021
  - Runner-up (1): 2017
- Supercoppa Italiana
  - Winner (3): 2018, 2021, 2022

=== Individual ===
International

- FIFA Beach Soccer World Cup (2):
  - Golden Boot: 2017, 2019
- Beach Soccer Stars (3):
  - World's top 3 best players: 2016, 2019
  - World dream team: 2019
- World Beach Games (1):
  - Top scorer: 2019
- Euro Beach Soccer League (4):
  - Regular season stages:
    - Top scorer: 2014 (x1), 2015 (x1)
    - Best player: 2015 (x1), 2016 (x1)
- UEFA qualifiers for the FIFA Beach Soccer World Cup (1):
  - Top scorer: 2019
- European Games (1):
  - Top scorer: 2019
- UEFA qualifiers for the World Beach Games (1):
  - Top scorer: 2019
- Euro Beach Soccer Cup (1):
  - Top scorer: 2016
- Euro Winners Cup (3):
  - Top scorer: 2016, 2017, 2019
- Euro Winners Challenge (1):
  - Top scorer: 2018

Domestic

- Italian Serie A (6):
  - Top scorer: 2010, 2012, 2014, 2018, 2019, 2022
- Coppa Italia (5):
  - Top scorer: 2010, 2014, 2015, 2019, 2022
- Blue Ball (1):
  - 2016
