= 2014 Euro Beach Soccer League =

Tournament details
- Dates: 20 June – 17 August
- Teams: 24 (from 1 confederation)
- Venue: 5 (in 5 host cities)

Final positions
- Champions: Russia (4th title)
- Runners-up: Spain
- Third place: Portugal
- Fourth place: Switzerland

Tournament statistics
- Top scorer(s): Llorenç (ESP) and Peremitin (RUS)
- Best player: Noel Ott (SUI)
- Best goalkeeper: Jesús Donaire (ESP)
- All statistics correct as of 1-sep-14.

The 2014 Euro Beach Soccer League (EBSL) is an annual European competition in beach soccer. The competitions allows national teams to compete in beach soccer in a league format over the summer months. Each season ends with a Superfinal, deciding the competition winner.

This season, there were twelve teams each participating in two divisions in each stage that faced each other in a round-robin system. Division A consisted of the 12 top teams in Europe based on the BSWW European Ranking. Division B consisted of 12 of the lower ranked teams and new entries to the competition. Each division has its own regulations and competition format.

The competition was used as qualifying event for the 2015 European Games. The top three teams from each group in the Superfinal qualified. The top team from the Promotional Finals, excluding the 12th team from Division A, also qualified. Azerbaijan were automatically qualified as hosts.

During the season, FIFA's Amendments to the Beach Soccer Laws of the Game – 2014 came into effect. This involved such changes as only awarding one point for a penalty shootout win (compared to two points previously) and instead of penalty shootouts being sudden death from the outset, both sides will take three penalty kicks each before sudden death rules come into use.

== Calendar ==
Dates	City	Country	Stage
20–22 June	Catania	Italy	Stage 1
27–29 June	Sopot	Poland	Stage 2
11–13 July	Moscow	Russia	Stage 3
8–10 August	Siófok	Hungary	Stage 4
14–17 August	Torredembarra	Spain	Superfinal and Promotion Final

All times are CEST (UTC+02:00).

== Teams ==
2014 Euro Beach Soccer League Divisions
DIVISION A			DIVISION B		
Belarus	Italy	Russia	Andorra	Czech Republic	Kazakhstan
France	Netherlands	Spain	Austria	England	Moldova
Germany	Poland	Switzerland	Azerbaijan	Estonia	Norway
Greece	Portugal	Ukraine	Bulgaria	Hungary	Turkey

== Stage 1 (Catania, 20–22 June) ==
Stage winners

=== Division A ===
==== Group 1 ====
Team	Pld	W	W+	WP	L	GF	GA	+/-	Pts
Italy	3	3	0	0	0	11	5	+6	9
Russia	3	1	0	0	2	10	8	+2	3
Netherlands	3	1	0	0	2	9	14	–5	3
France	3	1	0	0	2	9	12	–3	3

==== Group 2 ====
Team	Pld	W	W+	WP	L	GF	GA	+/-	Pts
Switzerland	3	3	0	0	0	21	10	+11	9
Germany	3	2	0	0	1	10	6	+4	6
Belarus	3	1	0	0	2	11	13	–2	3
Poland	3	0	0	0	3	6	19	–13	0

=== Schedule and results ===
20 June 2014
14:45

Poland	3 – 4	Belarus
	Report

20 June 2014
16:00

Italy	6 – 2	Netherlands
	Report

20 June 2014
17:15

France	2 – 6	Russia
	Report

20 June 2014
18:30

Germany	2 – 4	Switzerland
	Report

21 June 2014
14:45

Poland	0 – 4	Germany
	Report

21 June 2014
16:00

Switzerland	6 – 5	Belarus
	Report

21 June 2014
17:15

Russia	3 – 4	Netherlands
	Report

21 June 2014
18:30

France	2 – 3	Italy
	Report

22 June 2014
14:45

Belarus	2 – 4	Germany
	Report

22 June 2014
16:00

Switzerland	11 – 3	Poland
	Report

22 June 2014
17:15

Netherlands	3 – 5	France
	Report

22 June 2014
18:30

Russia	1 – 2	Italy
	Report

=== Individual Awards ===
MVP: (Switzerland) Noël Ott
Top scorer: (Switzerland) Noël Ott (11 goals)
Best goalkeeper: (Germany) Sasha Penke

== Stage 2 (Sopot, 27–29 June) ==
Stage winners

=== Division A ===
==== Group 1 ====
Team	Pld	W	W+	WP	L	GF	GA	+/-	Pts
Portugal	3	3	0	0	0	19	7	+12	9
Greece	3	1	1	0	1	9	12	–3	5
Poland	3	1	0	0	2	14	15	–1	3
Netherlands	3	0	0	0	3	5	13	–8	0

==== Group 2 ====
Team	Pld	W	W+	WP	L	GF	GA	+/-	Pts
Spain	3	2	0	0	1	11	12	–1	6
Ukraine	3	1	0	1	1	11	9	+2	4
France	3	1	0	0	2	11	13	–2	3
Switzerland	3	1	0	0	2	17	16	+1	3

=== Schedule and results ===
27 June 2014
13:15

Switzerland	3 – 7	France
	Report

27 June 2014
14:30

Portugal	3 – 1	Netherlands
	Report

27 June 2014
15:45

Spain	2 – 1	Ukraine
	Report

27 June 2014
17:00

Greece	4 – 3 (a.e.t.)	Poland
	Report

28 June 2014
13:15

Switzerland	6 – 6 (a.e.t.)	Ukraine
	Report
Penalties
	1 – 2

28 June 2014
14:30

Portugal	8 – 0	Greece
	Report

28 June 2014
15:45

Spain	6 – 3	France
	Report

28 June 2014
17:00

Poland	5 – 3	Netherlands
	Report

29 June 2014
13:15

Ukraine	4 – 1	France
	Report

29 June 2014
14:30

Netherlands	1 – 5	Greece
	Report

29 June 2014
15:45

Switzerland	8 – 3	Spain
	Report

29 June 2014
17:00

Poland	6 – 8	Portugal
	Report

=== Individual Awards ===
MVP: (Poland) Witold Ziober
Top scorer: (Spain) Llorenç Gómez (7 goals)
Best goalkeeper: (Portugal) Nuno Hidalgo

== Stage 3 (Moscow, 11–13 July) ==
Stage winners (Div. A)
Stage winners (Div. B)

=== Division A ===
Team	Pld	W	W+	WP	L	GF	GA	+/-	Pts
Russia	3	2	0	0	1	13	5	+8	6
Spain	3	2	0	0	1	11	5	+6	6
Belarus	3	2	0	0	1	11	11	0	6
Greece	3	0	0	0	3	5	19	–14	0

=== Division B ===
Team	Pld	W	W+	WP	L	GF	GA	+/-	Pts
Estonia	3	2	0	0	1	11	6	+5	6
Azerbaijan	3	2	0	0	1	8	5	+3	6
Moldova	3	1	0	0	2	10	14	–4	3
Kazakhstan	3	0	0	1	2	6	10	–4	1

=== Schedule and results ===
11 July 2014
16:45

Estonia	7 – 3	Moldova
	Report

11 July 2014
18:00

Azerbaijan	3 – 1	Kazakhstan
	Report

11 July 2014
19:15

Spain	4 – 1	Belarus
	Report

11 July 2014
20:30

Greece	0 – 7	Russia
	Report

12 July 2014
16:45

Estonia	2 – 1	Azerbaijan
	Report

12 July 2014
18:00

Kazakhstan	3 – 5	Moldova
	Report

12 July 2014
19:15

Spain	6 – 0	Greece
	Report

12 July 2014
20:30

Russia	2 – 4	Belarus
	Report

13 July 2014
15:45

Moldova	2 – 4	Azerbaijan
	Report

13 July 2014
17:00

Kazakhstan	2 – 2 (a.e.t.)	Estonia
	Report
Penalties
	3 – 2

13 July 2014
18:15

Belarus	6 – 5	Greece
	Report

13 July 2014
19:30

Russia	4 – 1	Spain
	Report

=== Individual Awards ===
MVP: (Russia) Aleksey Makarov
Top scorer: (Belarus) Ihar Bryshtel, (Russia) Aleksey Makarov (4 goals)
Best goalkeeper: (Spain) Dona

== Stage 4 (Siófok, 8–10 August) ==
Stage winners (Div. A)
Stage winners (Div. B)

=== Division A ===
Team	Pld	W	W+	WP	L	GF	GA	+/-	Pts
Ukraine	3	2	0	0	1	13	12	+1	6
Portugal	3	1	0	1	1	13	11	+2	4
Italy	3	0	1	0	2	18	17	+1	2
Germany	3	0	0	1	2	12	16	–4	1

=== Division B ===
==== Group 1 ====
Team	Pld	W	W+	WP	L	GF	GA	+/-	Pts
Hungary	3	2	0	1	0	16	12	+4	7
Czech Republic	3	2	0	0	1	19	10	+9	6
England	3	1	0	0	2	17	16	+1	3
Andorra	3	0	0	0	3	5	19	–14	0

==== Group 2 ====
Team	Pld	W	W+	WP	L	GF	GA	+/-	Pts
Turkey	3	3	0	0	0	14	5	+9	9
Bulgaria	3	2	0	0	1	13	14	–1	6
Norway	3	1	0	0	2	11	13	–2	3
Austria	3	0	0	0	3	9	15	–6	0

=== Schedule and results ===
8 August 2014
14:45

Turkey	5 – 1	Bulgaria
	Report

8 August 2014
16:00

Andorra	1 – 4	Hungary
	Report

8 August 2014
17:15

Norway	4 – 3	Austria
	Report

8 August 2014
18:30

Czech Republic	7 – 3	England
	Report

8 August 2014
19:45

Italy	6 – 5 (a.e.t.)	Ukraine
	Report

8 August 2014
21:00

Germany	2 – 5	Portugal
	Report

9 August 2014
14:45

Turkey	6 – 4	Norway
	Report

9 August 2014
16:00

Austria	6 – 8	Bulgaria
	Report

9 August 2014
17:15

Czech Republic	7 – 2	Andorra
	Report

9 August 2014
18:30

Italy	7 – 7	Germany
	Report
Penalties
	1 – 3

9 August 2014
19:45

Hungary	7 – 6	England
	Report

9 August 2014
21:00

Portugal	3 – 4	Ukraine
	Report

10 August 2014
12:45

Bulgaria	4 – 3	Norway
	Report

10 August 2014
14:00

Austria	0 – 3	Turkey
	Report

10 August 2014
15:15

England	8 – 2	Andorra
	Report

10 August 2014
16:30

Germany	3 – 4	Ukraine
	Report

10 August 2014
17:45

Hungary	5 – 5	Czech Republic
	Report
Penalties
	6 – 5

10 August 2014
19:00

Portugal	5 – 5	Italy
	Report
Penalties
	3 – 2

=== Individual Awards ===
MVP: (Ukraine) Roman Pachev
Top scorer: (Italy) Gabriele Gori (9 goals)
Best goalkeeper: (Italy) Stefano Spada

== Cumulative standings ==
The eight best placed teams in Division A (including stage winners and hosts), in which each team played two stages, qualified for the Superfinal. The qualifiers for the Promotion Final were the winners and runners-up in each Division B stage, the best 3rd place team from all of the Division B events, and the last placed team in Division A.

Team advanced to Superfinal
Team advanced to Promotional Final

Ranking & tie-breaking criteria: Division A – 1. Points earned 2. Goal difference 3. Goals scored | Division B – 1. Points earned 2. Highest stage placement 3. Goal difference 4. Goals scored.

=== Division A ===
Pos	Team	Pld	W	W+	WP	L	GF	GA	+/-	Pts
1	Portugal	6	4	0	1	1	32	18	+14	13
2	Switzerland	6	4	0	0	2	38	26	+12	12
3	Spain	6	4	0	0	2	22	17	+5	12
4	Italy	6	3	1	0	2	29	22	+7	11
5	Ukraine	6	3	0	1	2	24	21	+3	10
6	Russia	6	3	0	0	3	23	13	+10	9
7	Belarus	6	3	0	0	3	22	24	–2	9
8	Germany	6	2	0	1	3	22	22	0	7
9	France	6	2	0	0	4	20	25	–5	6
10	Greece	6	1	1	0	4	14	31	–17	5
11	Netherlands	6	1	0	0	5	14	27	–13	3
12	Poland	6	1	0	0	5	20	34	–14	3

=== Division B ===
Pos	Team	Pld	W	W+	WP	L	GF	GA	+/-	Pts
1	Turkey	3	3	0	0	0	14	5	+9	9
2	Hungary	3	2	0	1	0	16	12	+4	7
3	Estonia	3	2	0	0	1	11	6	+5	6
4	Czech Republic	3	2	0	0	1	19	10	+9	6
5	Azerbaijan	3	2	0	0	1	8	5	+3	6
6	Bulgaria	3	2	0	0	1	13	14	–1	6
7	England	3	1	0	0	2	17	16	+1	3
8	Norway	3	1	0	0	2	11	13	–2	3
9	Moldova	3	1	0	0	2	10	14	–4	3
10	Kazakhstan	3	0	0	1	2	6	10	–4	1
11	Austria	3	0	0	0	3	9	15	–6	0
12	Andorra	3	0	0	0	3	5	19	–14	0

== Finals (Torredembarra, 14–17 August) ==
The top three teams from each group in the Superfinal qualified for the 2015 European Games in Baku. The top team from the Promotional Final, excluding the 12th team from Division A, also qualified. Azerbaijan was automatically qualified as host country.

=== Division A (Superfinal) ===
clinched Championship Final

==== Group 1 Standings ====
Team	Pld	W	W+	WP	L	GF	GA	+/-	Pts
Russia	3	2	0	0	1	22	15	+7	6
Portugal	3	2	0	0	1	17	14	+3	6
Italy	3	2	0	0	1	10	13	–3	6
Belarus	3	0	0	0	3	4	11	–7	0

==== Group 2 Standings ====
Team	Pld	W	W+	WP	L	GF	GA	+/-	Pts
Spain	3	3	0	0	0	22	10	+12	9
Switzerland	3	2	0	0	1	14	11	+3	6
Ukraine	3	1	0	0	2	15	13	+2	3
Germany	3	0	0	0	3	2	19	–17	0

=== Group stage results ===
All kickoff times are of local time in Torredembarra (UTC+02:00).

14 August 2014
15:15

Germany	0 – 7	Switzerland
	Report

14 August 2014
16:30

Belarus	1 – 3	Portugal
	Report

14 August 2014
17:45

Italy	2 – 9	Russia
	Report

14 August 2014
19:00

Spain	8 – 6	Ukraine
	Report

15 August 2014
15:15

Italy	2 – 1	Belarus
	Report

15 August 2014
16:30

Switzerland	5 – 3	Ukraine
	Report

15 August 2014
17:45

Portugal	11 – 7	Russia
	Report

15 August 2014
19:00

Spain	6 – 2	Germany
	Report

16 August 2014
15:15

Ukraine	6 – 0	Germany
	Report

16 August 2014
16:30

Portugal	3 – 6	Italy
	Report

16 August 2014
17:45

Russia	6 – 2	Belarus
	Report

16 August 2014
19:00

Switzerland	2 – 8	Spain
	Report

=== Play-off results ===
==== Seventh-place Match ====
17 August 2014
11:30

Belarus	3 – 3	Germany
	Report
Penalties
	9 – 8

Platja de Torredembarra

==== Fifth-place Match ====
17 August 2014
14:00

Ukraine	2 – 2	Italy
	Report
Penalties
	4 – 5

Platja de Torredembarra

==== Third-place Match ====
17 August 2014
16:30

Switzerland	2 – 6	Portugal
	Report

Platja de Torredembarra

==== Championship final Match ====
17 August 2014
19:00

Spain	3 – 4	Russia
	Report

Platja de Torredembarra

=== Individual Awards ===
- MVP: (Switzerland) Noël Ott
- Top scorer: (Russia) Anatoliy Peremitin, (Spain) Llorenç Gómez (7 goals)
- Best goalkeeper: (Spain) Dona

=== Final Division A Standing ===
Rank	Team
1	Russia
2	Spain
3	Portugal
4	Switzerland
5	Italy
6	Ukraine
7	Belarus
8	Germany

=== Division B (Promotional Final) ===
clinched Promotional Final

==== Group 1 Standings ====
Team	Pld	W	W+	WP	L	GF	GA	+/-	Pts
Poland	3	3	0	0	0	16	2	+14	9
Azerbaijan	3	2	0	0	1	14	10	+4	6
Czech Republic	3	0	1	0	2	6	12	–6	2
Bulgaria	3	0	0	0	3	4	16	–12	0

==== Group 2 Standings ====
Team	Pld	W	W+	WP	L	GF	GA	+/-	Pts
Hungary	3	2	0	0	1	11	7	+4	6
Turkey	3	2	0	0	1	9	9	0	6
England	3	1	1	0	1	12	10	+2	5
Estonia	3	0	0	0	3	3	9	–6	0

=== Group stage results ===
All kickoff times are of local time in Torredembarra (UTC+02:00).

14 August 2014
10:15

Czech Republic	2 – 6	Azerbaijan
	Report

14 August 2014
11:30

Bulgaria	0 – 6	Poland
	Report

14 August 2014
12:45

Hungary	1 – 0	Estonia
	Report

14 August 2014
14:00

Turkey	4 – 2	England
	Report

15 August 2014
10:15

Czech Republic	3 – 2 (a.e.t.)	Bulgaria
	Report

15 August 2014
11:30

Poland	6 – 1	Azerbaijan
	Report

15 August 2014
12:45

Turkey	3 – 1	Estonia
	Report

15 August 2014
14:00

Hungary	4 – 5 (a.e.t.)	England
	Report

16 August 2014
10:15

Estonia	2 – 5	England
	Report

16 August 2014
11:30

Azerbaijan	7 – 2	Bulgaria
	Report

16 August 2014
12:45

Turkey	2 – 6	Hungary
	Report

16 August 2014
14:00

Poland	4 – 1	Czech Republic
	Report

=== Play-off results ===
==== Seventh-place Match ====
17 August 2014
10:15

Bulgaria	5 – 4	Estonia
	Report

Platja de Torredembarra

==== Fifth-place Match ====
17 August 2014
11:30

Czech Republic	6 – 4	England
	Report

Platja de Torredembarra

==== Third-place Match ====
17 August 2014
15:15

Azerbaijan	5 – 3	Turkey
	Report

Platja de Torredembarra

==== Promotion Final ====
17 August 2014
16:30

Hungary	6 – 4	Poland
	Report

Platja de Torredembarra

=== Final Division B Standing ===
Rank	Team	
1	Hungary	Promoted Division A
2	Poland	Relegated Division B^{1}
3	Azerbaijan	Stay Division B
4	Turkey	Stay Division B
5	Czech Republic	Stay Division B
6	England	Stay Division B
7	Bulgaria	Stay Division B
8	Estonia	Stay Division B

1. The Netherlands, a Division A side, did not enter the following year's EBSL in 2015. To ensure 12 teams in the top division in 2015 as normal, BSWW retrospectively awarded promotion to the runners-up of the 2014 Promotion Final as well as the winners, in the lead up to the start of the 2015 season. The runners-up happened to be the relegated side, Poland, who ultimately did not see relegation materialise for this reason and continued to compete in Division A.

== Sources ==
- Group distribution for EBSL 2014 announced. Beach Soccer Worldwide.
