= Pallone Azzurro =

The Pallone Azzurro ("Azure Football") is an individual award assigned by the FIGC to the best Italian player according to the votes of the fans registered to Vivo Azzurro, the official fan club of the Italy national football team.

The fans vote one recipient from a shortlist of candidates selected from the "Man of the Match" awards given to players after the matches of the various Italy national football teams during the previous year.

== Winners ==
Year	Best Italian footballer	Best Italian women's footballer	Best futsal player	Best beach soccer player	Ref(s)
2012	Andrea Pirlo	Not awarded			
2013	Gianluigi Buffon	Not awarded			
2014	Matteo Darmian	Martina Rosucci	Gabriel Lima	Francesco Corosiniti	
2015	Marco Verratti	Manuela Giugliano	Alex Merlim	Simone Del Mestre	
2016	Gianluigi Buffon	Melania Gabbiadini	Stefano Mammarella	Gabriele Gori	
2021	Federico Chiesa	Cristiana Girelli	Not awarded		
