= 2018 Euro Beach Soccer League =

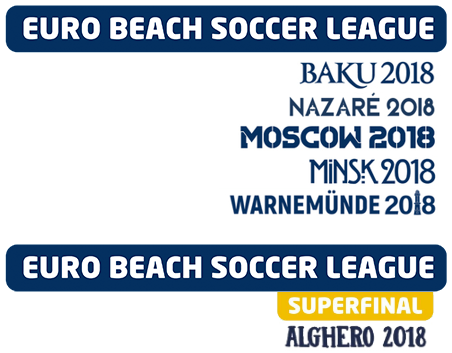
- Composite image of the banner style logos used during the 2018 EBSL. At each regular season stage, the main EBSL banner is joined solely by the subtitle corresponding to that stage.

Tournament details
- Host countries: Azerbaijan; Portugal; Russia; Belarus; Germany; Italy
- Dates: 22 June – 9 September
- Teams: 27 (from 1 confederation)
- Venues: 6 (in 6 host cities)

Final positions
- Champions: Italy (2nd title)
- Runners-up: Spain
- Third place: Portugal
- Fourth place: Russia

Tournament statistics
- Matches played: 89
- Goals scored: 714 (8.02 per match)

Locations of the five stages and the Superfinal of the 2018 Euro Beach Soccer League

The 2018 Euro Beach Soccer League (EBSL) was the 21st edition of the Euro Beach Soccer League, the annual, premier competition in European beach soccer contested between men's national teams. It was organised by Beach Soccer Worldwide (BSWW), in a league and play-off format.

This season, teams continued to take part in two divisions, the top tier (Division A) and the bottom tier (Division B). 12 teams continued to contest Division A, consisting of the top 11 finishers from last year plus Turkey who were promoted to the top tier. Whilst Division B accommodated 15 nations: 13 nations who did not gain promotion from last season, Georgia who made their debut, plus Greece who were relegated from the top tier at the end of last season. No nations returned after an absence from competing in recent years, however, the Netherlands, who had competed in the last two seasons, did not enter this year.

A total of five stages of fixtures were scheduled during the regular season. Each team from Division A played in two stages whilst each team in Division B played in one. At each stage the participating nations earned points for the overall league tables.

At the end of the regular season, according to the league tables, the eight best teams in Division A advanced to the post-season event, the Superfinal, to compete to become the winners of this year's EBSL. Meanwhile, the top seven teams in Division B (the four group winners and three best runners-up) and the team ranked bottom of Division A played in a different post-season event, the Promotion Final, to try to earn a spot in Division A next year.

The top scorer of the 2002 season, Alan of Portugal, announced his retirement on 11 June; Alan competed in all 20 EBSL seasons since the inaugural edition in 1998, meaning this year marked the first EBSL season in which he did not feature.

The league also acted as the qualification route to the 2019 European Games; the top six teams of the Superfinal plus the Promotion Final winners qualified to joint hosts Belarus.

Germany, the defending Division A team in the Promotion Final, beat Romania in the final to win the event, therefore retaining their Division A status for next season. Russia were the defending champions but were knocked out of title-winning contention in the group stage of the Superfinal, ultimately finishing fourth in the post-season event, just the second time (the other 2005), that Russia failed to finish in the top three. The concluding match of the Superfinal was contested between Italy and Spain, who were looking to end 13 and 12-year waits since their last respective EBSL titles (2005 and 2006). Italy, on home sand, won the match on penalties to claim their second European title.

== Calendar and locations ==
The schedule was announced on 23 March.

For the first time, Azerbaijan and Belarus hosted an EBSL regular season stage. It was also the first time since the 2013 season that no nations in Division B hosted a stage, only the second time this had occurred since divisions were introduced in 2002.

Phase	Dates	Country	City	Stage	Divisions	
Regular season	22–24 June	Azerbaijan	Baku	Stage 1	A	
Regular season	6–8 July	Portugal	Nazaré	Stage 2	A	B
Regular season	20–22 July	Russia	Moscow	Stage 3	A	B
Regular season	3–5 August	Belarus	Minsk	Stage 4	A	
Regular season	24–26 August	Germany	Warnemünde	Stage 5	A	B
Postseason/ Finals	6–9 September	Italy	Alghero	Superfinal	A	
Postseason/ Finals	6–9 September	Italy	Alghero	Promotion Final		B

== Teams ==
Competing in Division A Competing in Division B Competed in previous editions but not this year Never competed in the EBSL

The following teams have entered this season, in the following divisions (12 in Division A, 15 in Division B).

The numbers in parentheses show the European ranking of each team prior to the start of the season, out of 36 nations.

=== Division A ===
- Portugal (1st)
- Russia (2nd)
- Italy (3rd)
- Switzerland (4th)
- Spain (5th)
- Ukraine (6th)
- Poland (7th)
- Belarus (8th)
- France (10th)
- Azerbaijan (12th)
- Germany (14th)
- Turkey^{1} (15th)

=== Division B ===
- Hungary (9th)
- England (11th)
- Czech Republic (13th)
- Greece^{2} (16th)
- Estonia (17th)
- Romania (18th)
- Moldova (19th)
- Norway (21st)
- Serbia (22nd)
- Bulgaria (23rd)
- Kazakhstan (24th)
- Denmark (25th)
- Lithuania (26th)
- Andorra (28th)
- Georgia^{3} (29th)

Notes:

1. Promoted from Division B at the end of the 2017 season
2. Relegated from Division A at the end of the 2017 season
3. Teams making their debut

== Stage 1 (Baku, 22–24 June) ==
Matches are listed as local time in Baku, AZT (UTC+4).

All matches took place at the Baku Beach Arena, part of the Flag Square cluster of the European Games Park in Sabail raion, with a capacity of 3,900. The stadium previously hosted the beach soccer event at the 2015 European Games.

There were no Division B fixtures during this stage.

=== Division A ===
==== Group 1 ====
Key:	Group winners /	(H)	Hosts

Pos	Team	Pld	W	W+	WP	L	GF	GA	GD	Pts
1	Portugal	3	3	0	0	0	14	5	+9	9
2	Belarus	3	2	0	0	1	9	6	+3	6
3	Azerbaijan (H)	3	1	0	0	2	5	11	–6	3
4	France	3	0	0	0	3	6	12	–6	0

22 June 2018	Portugal	3–2	Belarus
16:00	Coimbra 7', 20'; Leo Martins 25'	Report(ru)	6' Chaikouski; 8' Savich	Referee: Raúl Martín González Francés (Spain)

22 June 2018	France	1–4	Azerbaijan
18:30	Barbotti 28'	Report(ru)	7', 31', 33' Zeynalov; 17' Aliyev	Referee: Oleg Cebotari (Moldova)

23 June 2018	Portugal	5–3	France
16:00	Leo Martins 6'; Coimbra 6'; Madjer 8', 13', 27'	Report(ru)	1' Soares; 25' Angeletti; 32' Barbotti	Referee: Raúl Martín González Francés (Spain)

23 June 2018	Belarus	4–1	Azerbaijan
18:30	Hapon 6', 24'; Bokach 19'; Samsonov 23'	Report(ru)	17' Ilkin	Referee: Ago Kaertmann (Estonia)

24 June 2018	Belarus	3–2	France
16:00	Hapon 6'; Brishtel 12'; Kanstantsinau 32'	Report(ru)	17' Belhomme; 28' Maison	Referee: Oleg Cebotari (Moldova)

24 June 2018	Azerbaijan	0–6	Portugal
18:30		Report(ru)	10' Santos; 19', 26' Coimbra; 21' (pen.) Be Martins; 29' Torres; 33' Leo Martins	Referee: Laurynas Arzuolaitis (Lithuania)

==== Group 2 ====
Key:	Group winners

Pos	Team	Pld	W	W+	WP	L	GF	GA	GD	Pts
1	Ukraine	3	2	0	1	0	11	9	+2	7
2	Switzerland	3	2	0	0	1	21	8	+13	6
3	Italy	3	1	0	0	2	6	9	–3	3
4	Germany	3	0	0	0	3	5	17	–12	0

22 June 2018	Switzerland	4–5	Ukraine
14:45	Borer 12', 12'; Ott 22' (pen.), 35'	Report(ru)	3', 19', 34' Korniichuk; 15' Medved; 29' Makeiev	Referee: Ingilab Mammadov (Azerbaijan)

22 June 2018	Germany	0–3	Italy
17:15		Report(ru)	13' Gori; 14' Ramacciotti; 22' Zurlo	Referee: Laurynas Arzuolaitis (Lithuania)

23 June 2018	Switzerland	10–2	Germany
14:45	Ott 5', 18', 34'; Spacca 6'; Biermann 7' (o.g.); Werder 24'; Stankovic 25', 36'; Hodel 28', 29'	Report(ru)	24' Svenson; 26' Biermann	Referee: Ali Jabrayilov (Azerbaijan)

23 June 2018	Italy	2–2 (a.e.t.) (3–4 p)	Ukraine
17:15	Corosiniti 17'; Zurlo 17' (pen.)	Report(ru)	9' Korniichuk; 26' Pachev	Referee: Ingilab Mammadov (Azerbaijan)
	Penalties
	Marinai (penalty scored); Corosiniti (penalty scored); Frainetti (penalty missed); Gori (penalty scored); Ramacciotti (penalty missed)		(penalty scored) Korniichuk; (penalty missed) Glutskyi; (penalty scored) Shcherytsia; (penalty scored) Pachev; (penalty scored) Voitok

24 June 2018	Ukraine	4–3	Germany
14:45	Pachev 10', 34'; Shcheritsa 16'; Korniichuk 27' (pen.)	Report(ru)	5' Weirauch; 17', 28' Biermann	Referee: Ingilab Mammadov (Azerbaijan)

24 June 2018	Italy	1–7	Switzerland
17:15	Gori 8'	Report(ru)	3', 33' Hodel; 12', 25', 35', 36' Stankovic; 29' Ott	Referee: Roman Borisov (Russia)

=== Awards ===
The following were presented after the conclusion of the final day's matches.

Stage Winners trophy	Top scorer(s)		Best player	Best goalkeeper
Portugal	(Switzerland) Dejan Stanković (Switzerland) Noël Ott	6 goals	(Portugal) Leo Martins	(Portugal) Elinton Andrade

== Stage 2 (Nazaré, 6–8 July) ==
Praia de Nazaré

Matches are listed as local time in Nazaré, WEST (UTC+1)

All matches took place at the Estádio do Viveiro on Praia de Nazaré (Nazaré Beach), in tandem with the hosting of the 2018 Women's Euro Beach Soccer Cup.

The stadium had recently been undergoing redevelopment, increasing its capacity from 1,600 to 2,200. However, one part of the stadium was still awaiting upgrades, meaning the new capacity figure was yet to be fully reached.

During this round, Bulgaria won a stage title for the first time (in either division).

=== Division A ===
Key:	Group winners /	(H) Hosts

Pos	Team	Pld	W	W+	WP	L	GF	GA	GD	Pts
1	Spain	3	1	1	1	0	15	10	+5	6
2	Ukraine	3	1	1	0	1	16	13	+3	5
3	Portugal (H)	3	1	0	0	2	12	12	0	3
4	Turkey	3	0	0	0	3	7	15	–8	0

6 July 2018	Turkey	3–5	Portugal
17:45	Demir 5'; Keskin 30', 35'	Report(ru)	3', 8', 26' Be Martins; 19' Goncalves; 35' Santos	Referee: Eduards Borisevics (Latvia)

6 July 2018	Spain	6–6 (a.e.t.) (3–2 p)	Ukraine
19:00	Suárez 4', 13'; Llorenç 8'; Chiky 19', 30'; Antonio 28'	Report(ru)	3' Pachev; 19', 29' Borsuk; 20', 24' Korniichuk; 36' Shcherytsia	Referee: Christian Zimmermann (Switzerland)
	Penalties
	Llorenç (penalty scored); Antonio (penalty scored); Chiky (penalty scored)		(penalty missed) Voitok; (penalty scored) Shcherytsia; (penalty scored) Glutskyi

7 July 2018	Spain	4–0	Turkey
15:15	Antonio 4'; Torres 22', 24'; Llorenç 36'	Report(ru)		Referee: Torsten Guenther (Germany)

7 July 2018	Portugal	3–4	Ukraine
16:30	Goncalves 12'; Leo Martins 20'; Santos 33'	Report(ru)	8' Pachev; 12' Voitok; 16' Sydorenko; 18' Korniichuk	Referee: Saverio Bottalico (Italy)

8 July 2018	Ukraine	6–4 (a.e.t.)	Turkey
16:30	Medved 8', 15', 37'; Sydorenko 31'; Borsuk 34'; Korniichuk 38'	Report(ru)	7', 14' Keskin; 31', 32' Terzioglu	Referee: Saverio Bottalico (Italy)

8 July 2018	Portugal	4–5 (a.e.t.)	Spain
19:00	Coimbra 1', 26'; Goncalves 8'; Madjer 15'	Report(ru)	5', 8' Antonio; 22', 25' Chiky; 38' Llorenç	Referee: Christian Zimmermann (Switzerland)

=== Division B ===
==== Group 1 ====
Key:	Group winners

Pos	Team	Pld	W	W+	WP	L	GF	GA	GD	Pts
1	Bulgaria	3	3	0	0	0	21	7	+14	9
2	Norway	3	2	0	0	1	16	9	+7	6
3	Czechia	3	1	0	0	2	14	11	+3	3
4	Andorra	3	0	0	0	3	2	26	–24	0

6 July 2018	Norway	5–3	Czechia
14:00	Li 6'; Nergaard 12'; Kristoffersen 16'; Salveson 24'; Sorensen 35'	Report(ru)	8' Folejtar; 12' Vyhnal; 22' Stejskal	Referee: Antonio Pereira (Portugal)

6 July 2018	Andorra	1–10	Bulgaria
16:30	Ibanez 23'	Report(ru)	10', 16', 18', 23', 36' Filipov; 12', 14' Martinov; 21' Adamov; 23', 28' Velikov	Referee: Sergio Gomes Soares (Portugal)

7 July 2018	Norway	8–1	Andorra
11:30	H. Salveson 2', 7', 7'; E. Salveson 8', 9'; Kandal 11'; Hacham 13'; Nergaard 30'	Report(ru)	20' C. Regalo	Referee: Christian Zimmermann (Switzerland)

7 July 2018	Bulgaria	6–3	Czechia
14:00	Filipov 10', 34'; Tsvetkov 16', 19'; Velikov 17'; Adamov 20'	Report(ru)	22', 33' Stejskal; 31' Furbacher	Referee: Eduards Borisevics (Latvia)

8 July 2018	Czechia	8–0	Andorra
12:45	Bocek 1', 7', 14'; Huráb 20', 29'; Furbacher 22', 36'; Klíma 36'	Report(ru)		Referee: Torsten Guenther (Germany)

8 July 2018	Bulgaria	5–3	Norway
15:15	Filipov 2', 36'; Tsvetkov 29'; Martinov 32', 36'	Report(ru)	24' Sorensen; 31', 36' E. Salveson	Referee: Dario Minder (Switzerland)

==== Group 2 ====
Key:	Group winners

Pos	Team	Pld	W	W+	WP	L	GF	GA	GD	Pts
1	Romania	2	1	0	1	0	8	6	+2	4
2	Serbia	2	0	0	1	1	4	4	0	1
3	Estonia	2	0	0	0	2	2	4	–2	0

The Serbia vs. Estonia match was the first goalless draw in the 20-year history of the EBSL.

6 July 2018	Serbia	0–0 (a.e.t.) (11–10 p)	Estonia
15:15		Report(ru)		Referee: Saverio Bottalico (Italy)
	Penalties
	Jovancic (penalty scored); Cubrilovic (penalty missed); Vucicevic (penalty scored); Grujic (penalty scored); Valentic (penalty scored); Lazic (penalty scored); Antic (penalty scored); Radisavljevic (penalty scored); Milivojevic (penalty scored); Jovancic (penalty scored); Vucicevic (penalty scored); Valentic (penalty scored)		(penalty scored) Stüf; (penalty scored) Truusalu; (penalty missed) Sooaluste; (penalty scored) Mäerog; (penalty scored) Kigaste; (penalty scored) Lukk; (penalty scored) Juha; (penalty scored) Tammevali; (penalty scored) Marmor; (penalty scored) Stüf; (penalty scored) Truusalu; (penalty missed) Sooaluste

7 July 2018	Romania	4–4 (a.e.t.) (3–1 p)	Serbia
12:45	Boata 13' (pen.), 21'; Maci 15', 39'	Report(ru)	5' Antic; 16' Grujic; 18' (o.g.) Ravi; 39' Jovancic	Referee: Sofien Benchabane (France)
	Penalties
	Maci (penalty scored); Alin (penalty scored); Boata (penalty scored)		(penalty missed) Jovancic; (penalty scored) Valentic

8 July 2018	Estonia	2–4	Romania
14:00	Juha 15'; Truusalu 18'	Report(ru)	1', 17' Boata; 11' Maci; 22' (o.g.) Juha	Referee: Luca Romani (Italy)

=== Awards ===
The following were presented after the conclusion of the final day's matches. Individual awards apply to Division A only.

Stage Winners trophy		Top scorer(s)			Best player	Best goalkeeper
Spain (Division A)	Bulgaria (Division B)	(Spain) Antonio Mayor (Spain) Chiky Ardil	(Ukraine) Oleksandr Korniichuk (Turkey) Cem Keskin	4 goals	(Portugal) Be Martins	(Ukraine) Vitalii Sydorenko

== Stage 3 (Moscow, 20–22 July) ==
Matches are listed as local time in Moscow, MSK (UTC+3).

All matches took place at Yantar Beach Soccer Stadium in the district of Strogino, with a capacity of 2,500.

This was the eighth time Moscow hosted an EBSL event, drawing level with Marseille as the cities to host the most events in the league's history.

During this round, Kazakhstan won an EBSL stage title for the first time (in either division).

=== Division A ===
Key:	Group winners /	(H) Hosts

Pos	Team	Pld	W	W+	WP	L	GF	GA	GD	Pts
1	Russia (H)	3	2	1	0	0	17	8	+9	8
2	Switzerland	3	1	0	0	2	13	11	+2	3
3	Azerbaijan	3	1	0	0	2	14	20	–6	3
4	Poland	3	1	0	0	2	15	20	–5	3

20 July 2018	Switzerland	5–6	Poland
17:15	Ott 10', 26', 27' (pen.); Hodel 19'; Stankovic 20'	Report(ru)	4', 26' Pozniak; 20' Daniluk; 21' Marciniak; 31', 31' Madani	Referee: Laurynas Arzuolaitis (Lithuania)

20 July 2018	Azerbaijan	3–8	Russia
18:30	Allahguliyev 13'; Zeynalov 19'; Nazarov 32'	Report(ru)	2' Paporotnyi; 3', 13' Makarov; 9', 30' Romanov; 11' Federov; 20', 35' Shishin	Referee: Ago Kaertmann (Estonia)

21 July 2018	Switzerland	6–2	Azerbaijan
17:15	Ott 6', 16' (pen.), 32'; Hodel 8'; Spacca 8'; Borer 30' (pen.)	Report(ru)	6' Nazarov; 28' (pen.) Mammadov	Referee: Csaba Baghy (Hungary)

21 July 2018	Russia	6–3	Poland
18:30	Romanov 11'; Krash 11'; Makarov 31'; Shishin 31', 35'; Paporotnyi 34'	Report(ru)	32' (pen.) Pozniak; 34' Friszkemut; 34' Marciniak	Referee: Ago Kaertmann (Estonia)

22 July 2018	Poland	6–9	Azerbaijan
17:25	Gac 13', 21'; Friszkemut 13', 19'; Poplawski 18'; Madani 29'	Report(ru)	6', 21' Allahguliev; 9', 18', 29', 33' Mammadov; 24', 30', 31' Haciyev	Referee: Ago Kaertmann (Estonia)

22 July 2018	Russia	3–2 (a.e.t.)	Switzerland
18:30	Shishin 11'; Paporotnyi 20'; Krash 37'	Report(ru)	3' Ott; 21' Hodel	Referee: Gionni Matticoli (Italy)

Switzerland, Azerbaijan and Poland are ranked accordingly based on their three-way head-to-head results

=== Division B ===
Key:	Group winners

Pos	Team	Pld	W	W+	WP	L	GF	GA	GD	Pts
1	Kazakhstan	3	3	0	0	0	18	11	+7	9
2	Moldova	3	1	1	0	1	15	12	+3	5
3	Greece	3	1	0	0	2	10	12	–2	3
4	Lithuania	3	0	0	0	3	9	17	–8	0

20 July 2018	Lithuania	3–6	Greece
14:45	Radavicius 11'; Novickov 22'; Tamaliunas 35'	Report(ru)	2', 35' Kafantaris; 11' Vidalis; 23' Pipinis; 28' (o.g.) Radavicius; 36' Biris	Referee: Csaba Baghy (Hungary)

20 July 2018	Moldova	6–7	Kazakhstan
16:00	Capsamun 14', 27'; Pavalachi 14'; Chapanov 23' (o.g.); Schiopu 29'; Cojocari 34'	Report(ru)	13', 14', 23', 31' Perevyortov; 14', 24' Muralinov; 29' Makagon	Referee: Viktor Listratov (Russia)

21 July 2018	Moldova	4–1	Lithuania
14:45	Arefiev 9'; Cojocari 13', 30'; Florea 18'	Report(ru)	33' Vitkauskas	Referee: Daniel Yuste Querol (Spain)

21 July 2018	Greece	0–4	Kazakhstan
16:00		Report(ru)	2' Perevyortov; 7' Demeshko; 10' Tyulpa; 23' Muralinov	Referee: Viktor Listratov (Russia)

22 July 2018	Kazakhstan	7–5	Lithuania
14:45	Makagon 4'; Muralinov 15', 27', 27'; Demeshko 29', 32'; Tyulpa 33'	Report(ru)	6', 36' Plytnikas; 23' (pen.), 35' Meskinis; 31' Radavicius	Referee: Csaba Baghy (Hungary)

22 July 2018	Greece	4–5 (a.e.t.)	Moldova
16:00	Papastathopoulos 9'; Thomas 20', 25'; Gkritzalis 26'	Report(ru)	3' Ignat; 16', 38' Cojocari; 26' Pavalachi; 34' Schiopu	Referee: Viktor Listratov (Russia)

=== Awards ===
The following were presented after the conclusion of the final day's matches. Individual awards apply to Division A only.

Stage Winners trophy		Top scorer(s)		Best player	Best goalkeeper
Russia (Division A)	Kazakhstan (Division B)	(Switzerland) Noël Ott	7 goals	(Russia) Dmitry Shishin	(Russia) Maxim Chuzhkov

== Stage 4 (Minsk, 3–5 August) ==
Matches are listed as local time in Minsk, FET (UTC+3).

All matches took place at the National Beach Soccer Stadium, part of the Olympic Sports Complex in Pyershamayski District, with a capacity of 1,300.

With construction beginning on 8 June, the stadium was a newbuild, commissioned specifically for the purpose of hosting the beach soccer event at the 2019 European Games; this stage was organised to take place in Minsk to serve as test event for the new venue ahead of the upcoming games.

There were no Division B fixtures during this stage; this contributes to the fact this was the first stage to feature just four teams since the Moscow stage of the 2013 season.

=== Division A ===
Key:	Group winners /	(H) Hosts

Pos	Team	Pld	W	W+	WP	L	GF	GA	GD	Pts
1	Belarus (H)	3	1	2	0	0	20	13	+7	7
2	Italy	3	2	0	0	1	16	10	+6	6
3	Turkey	3	1	0	0	2	13	19	–6	3
4	Poland	3	0	0	0	3	15	22	–7	0

3 August 2018	Italy	8–4	Poland
17:15	Gori 2', 14', 31'; Frainetti 7', 36'; Palazzolo 10'; Marinai 21'; Corosiniti 36'	Report(ru)	2' Gac; 10', 25' Pozniak; 36' Friszkemut	Referee: Mikhail Prokharav (Belarus)

3 August 2018	Belarus	9–4	Turkey
18:30	Kanstantsinau 2'; Bokach 9', 14'; Bryshtel 9', 23'; Chaikouski 10'; Savich 26'; Samsonov 17'; Miranovich 24'	Report(ru)	18', 33' Semih; 24' (pen.) Yasin; 27' Baris	Referee: Vitaliy Levchenko (Russia)

4 August 2018	Turkey	0–3	Italy
17:15		Report(ru)	2' (pen.) Palazzolo; 30' Ramacciotti; 31' Zurlo	Referee: Vitaliy Levchenko (Russia)

4 August 2018	Belarus	5–4 (a.e.t.)	Poland
18:30	Savich 14' (pen.), 25', 31'; Samsonov 23'; Kanstantsinau 38'	Report(ru)	5' Pozniak; 16' Madani; 17' Friszkemut; 24' (pen.) Depta	Referee: Jurijs Ivusins (Latvia)

5 August 2018	Poland	7–9	Turkey
17:15	Gac 9'; Jesionowski 9', 16', 35', 36'; Pozniak 12', 19'	Report(ru)	1', 2', 25', 28' Baris; 5' Yesilirmak; 12', 16', 30' Keskin; 19' Semih	Referee: Mikhail Prokharav (Belarus)

5 August 2018	Italy	5–6 (a.e.t.)	Belarus
18:30	Zurlo 1', 8'; Marinai 7'; Palazzolo 9'; Ramacciotti 35'	Report(ru)	8' (o.g.) Ramacciotti; 14', 16', 21' (pen.) Savich; 27' Bokach; 37' Bryshtel	Referee: Vitaliy Levchenko (Russia)

=== Awards ===
The following were presented after the conclusion of the final day's matches.

Stage Winners trophy	Top scorer(s)		Best player	Best goalkeeper
Belarus	(Belarus) Ilia Savich	7 goals	(Belarus) Ihar Bryshtel	(Italy) Simone Del Mestre

== Stage 5 (Warnemünde, 24–26 August) ==
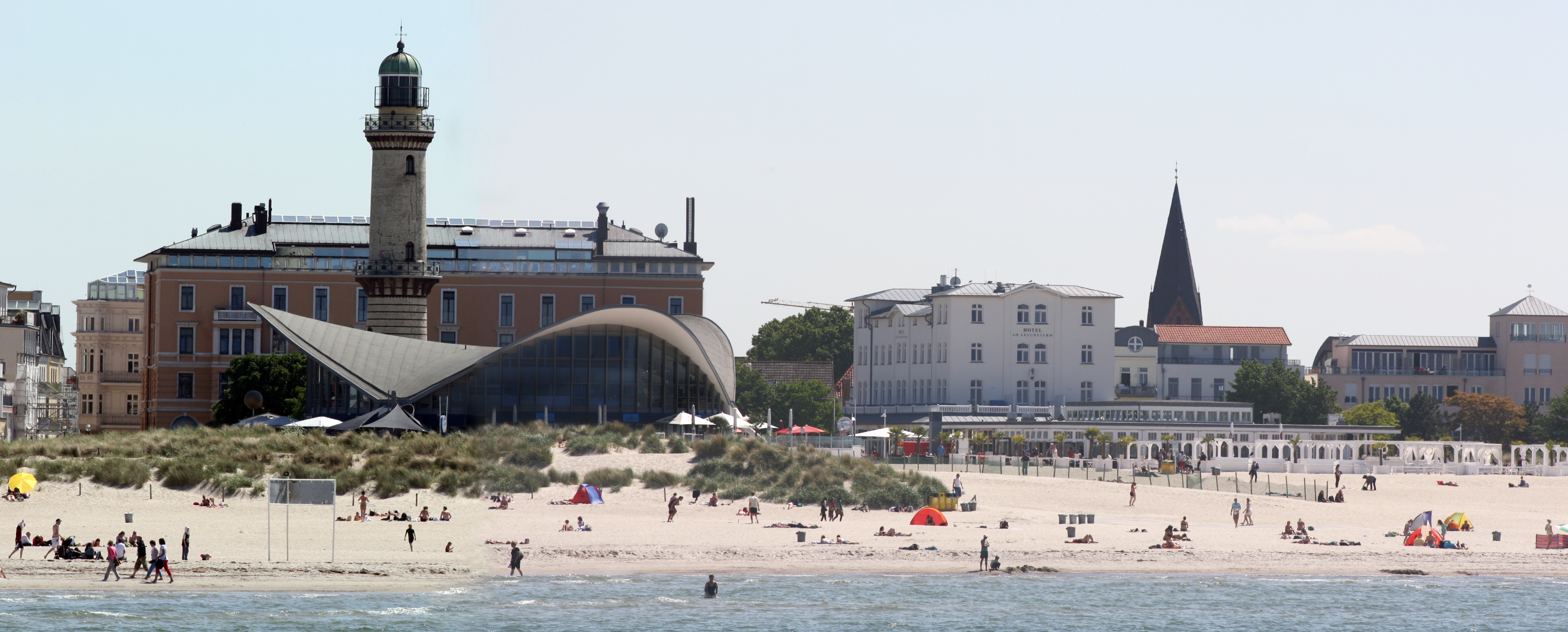
Warnemünde Beach; site of the arena (right)

Matches are listed as local time in Warnemünde, CEST (UTC+2)

All matches took place on the site of the Sport & Beach Arena on Warnemünde Beach, at the purpose built DFB Beachsoccer Arena, with a capacity of approximately 1,500 seats.

Georgia made their EBSL debut during this stage, the 34th different nation to compete in the league.

England claimed the Division B stage crown, meaning they won back-to-back second-tier titles for the first time.

=== Division A ===
Key:	Group winners /	(H) Hosts

Pos	Team	Pld	W	W+	WP	L	GF	GA	GD	Pts
1	Spain	3	3	0	0	0	18	9	+9	9
2	Russia	3	2	0	0	1	12	7	+5	6
3	France	3	1	0	0	2	7	10	–3	3
4	Germany (H)	3	0	0	0	2	6	17	–11	0

24 August 2018	Russia	2–6	Spain
16:15	Novikov 3'; Shkarin 18'	Report(ru)	13', 35' Chiky; 16' Llorenç; 21' Suarez; 31' Guisado; 33' Torres	Referee: Christian Zimmermann (Switzerland)

24 August 2018	France	4–1	Germany
17:30	Leblanc 18'; Barbotti 19'; Basquaise 26'; Angeletti 35'	Report(ru)	34' Romrigg	Referee: Lukasz Ostrowski (Poland)

25 August 2018	Spain	9–5	Germany
14:00	Antonio 2', 26'; Llorenç 5', 22', 27', 28'; Suarez 11'; Chiky 29'	Report(ru)	12' Niblein; 13', 24' Biermann; 19' Metzler	Referee: Murat Gozutok (Turkey)

25 August 2018	Russia	6–1	France
16:30	Krash 9', 22', 30'; Zemskov 21', 26', 32'	Report(ru)	13' Angeletti	Referee: Andrei Karhu (Estonia)

26 August 2018	Spain	3–2	France
15:25	Antonio 9', 21'; Llorenç 14'	Report(ru)	3' (pen.) Angeletti; 4' Grandon	Referee: Lukasz Ostrowski (Poland)

26 August 2018	Germany	0–4	Russia
16:30		Report(ru)	1' Zemskov; 30' Lovchev; 4' Shishin; 12' Paporotnyi	Referee: Christian Zimmermann (Switzerland)

=== Division B ===
Key:	Group winners

Pos	Team	Pld	W	W+	WP	L	GF	GA	GD	Pts
1	England	3	3	0	0	0	20	7	+13	9
2	Hungary	3	2	0	0	1	18	15	+3	6
3	Denmark	3	1	0	0	2	10	16	–6	3
4	Georgia	3	0	0	0	3	8	18	–10	0

24 August 2018	England	5–1	Denmark
13:45	Clarke 1', 17'; O'Rourke 8', 14', 20' (pen.)	Report(ru)	33' Khattab	Referee: Torsten Guenther (Germany)

24 August 2018	Georgia	4–5	Hungary
15:00	Pargalava 6', 29', 36'; Todadze 25'	Report(ru)	16' Genczler; 19', 32' Besenyei; 23' Lipok; 27' Fekete	Referee: Vitalij Gomolko (Lithuania)

25 August 2018	England	8–0	Georgia
12:45	Clarke 2' (pen.), 2', 28' (pen.); O'Rourke 11', 16', 31'; Younie 22', 27'	Report(ru)		Referee: Alfredo Pavone (Italy)

25 August 2018	Hungary	7–4	Denmark
15:15	Rutai 4'; Fekete 11'; Szentes-Biro 16', 24'; Besenyei 25', 26'; Menyhei 34'	Report(ru)	3', 15', 33' Damm; 34' Jorgensen	Referee: Malte Gerhardt (Germany)

26 August 2018	Denmark	5–4	Georgia
12:45	Lindberg-Levin 17'; Khattab 20', 22', 33'; Jorgensen 24'	Report(ru)	27', 32' Pargalava; 35', 36' Chanturia	Referee: Torsten Guenther (Germany)

26 August 2018	Hungary	6–7	England
14:00	Balazs 4'; Fekete 9'; Menyhei 11', 27'; Berkes 33'; Besenyei 35'	Report(ru)	9', 20', 29', 36' Clarke; 17', 36' Younie; 19' O'Rourke	Referee: Vitalij Gomolko (Lithuania)

=== Awards ===
The following were presented after the conclusion of the final day's matches. Individual awards apply to Division A only.

Stage Winners trophy		Top scorer(s)		Best player	Best goalkeeper
Spain (Division A)	England (Division B)	(Spain) Llorenç Gomez	6 goals	(Spain) Antonio Mayor	(Russia) Ivan Ostrovskii

== League tables ==
At end of regular season

Ranking & tie-breaking criteria: Division A – 1. Points earned 2. Goal difference 3. Goals scored | Division B – 1. Highest group placement 2. Points earned 3. Goal difference 4. Goals scored 5. Results against 4th place team

=== Division A ===
Pos	Team	Pld	W	W+	WP	L	GF	GA	GD	Pts	Qualification
1	Spain	6	4	1	1	0	33	19	+14	15	Advance to Superfinal
2	Russia	6	4	1	0	1	29	15	+14	14	Advance to Superfinal
3	Belarus	6	3	2	0	1	29	19	+10	13	Advance to Superfinal
4	Portugal	6	4	0	0	2	26	17	+9	12	Advance to Superfinal
5	Ukraine	6	3	1	1	1	27	22	+5	12	Advance to Superfinal
6	Switzerland	6	3	0	0	3	34	19	+15	9	Advance to Superfinal
7	Italy	6	3	0	0	3	22	19	+3	9	Advance to Superfinal
8	Azerbaijan	6	2	0	0	4	19	31	–12	6	Advance to Superfinal
9	France	6	1	0	0	5	13	22	–9	3	
10	Poland	6	1	0	0	5	30	42	–12	3	
11	Turkey	6	1	0	0	5	20	34	–14	3	
12	Germany	6	0	0	0	6	11	34	–23	0	Promotion Final

=== Division B ===
Pos	Team	Pld	W	W+	WP	L	GF	GA	GD	Pts	Qualification
1	England (Q) ●	2	2	0	0	0	12	7	+5	6	Advance to Promotion; Final
2	Bulgaria (Q) ●	2	2	0	0	0	11	6	+5	6	Advance to Promotion; Final
3	Kazakhstan (Q) ●	2	2	0	0	0	11	6	+5	6	Advance to Promotion; Final
4	Romania (Q) ●	2	1	0	1	0	8	6	+2	4	Advance to Promotion; Final
5	Hungary (q) ●	2	1	0	0	1	12	8	+4	3	Advance to Promotion; Final
6	Norway (q) ●	2	1	0	0	1	8	8	0	3	Advance to Promotion; Final
7	Moldova (q) ●	2	0	1	0	1	11	11	0	2	Advance to Promotion; Final
8	Serbia ●	2	0	0	1	1	4	4	0	1	
9	Estonia ●	2	0	0	0	2	2	4	–2	0	
10	Czechia ●	2	0	0	0	2	6	11	–5	0	
11	Greece ●	2	0	0	0	2	4	9	–5	0	
12	Denmark ●	2	0	0	0	2	5	12	–7	0	
13	Lithuania ●	3	0	0	0	3	9	17	–8	0	
14	Georgia ●	3	0	0	0	3	8	18	–10	0	
15	Andorra ●	3	0	0	0	3	2	26	–24	0	

Note: Since one group in Division B consisted of just three teams, for the teams who finished in 1st, 2nd or 3rd in a group of four, their results against the 4th placed team in their groups have been discounted.
Key:
Team group placement: ● 1st place / ● 2nd place / ● 3rd place / ● 4th place
(Q) – Qualified to Promotion Final as a group winner
(q) – Qualified to Promotion Final as a best group runner-up

== Promotion Final (Alghero, 6–9 September) ==
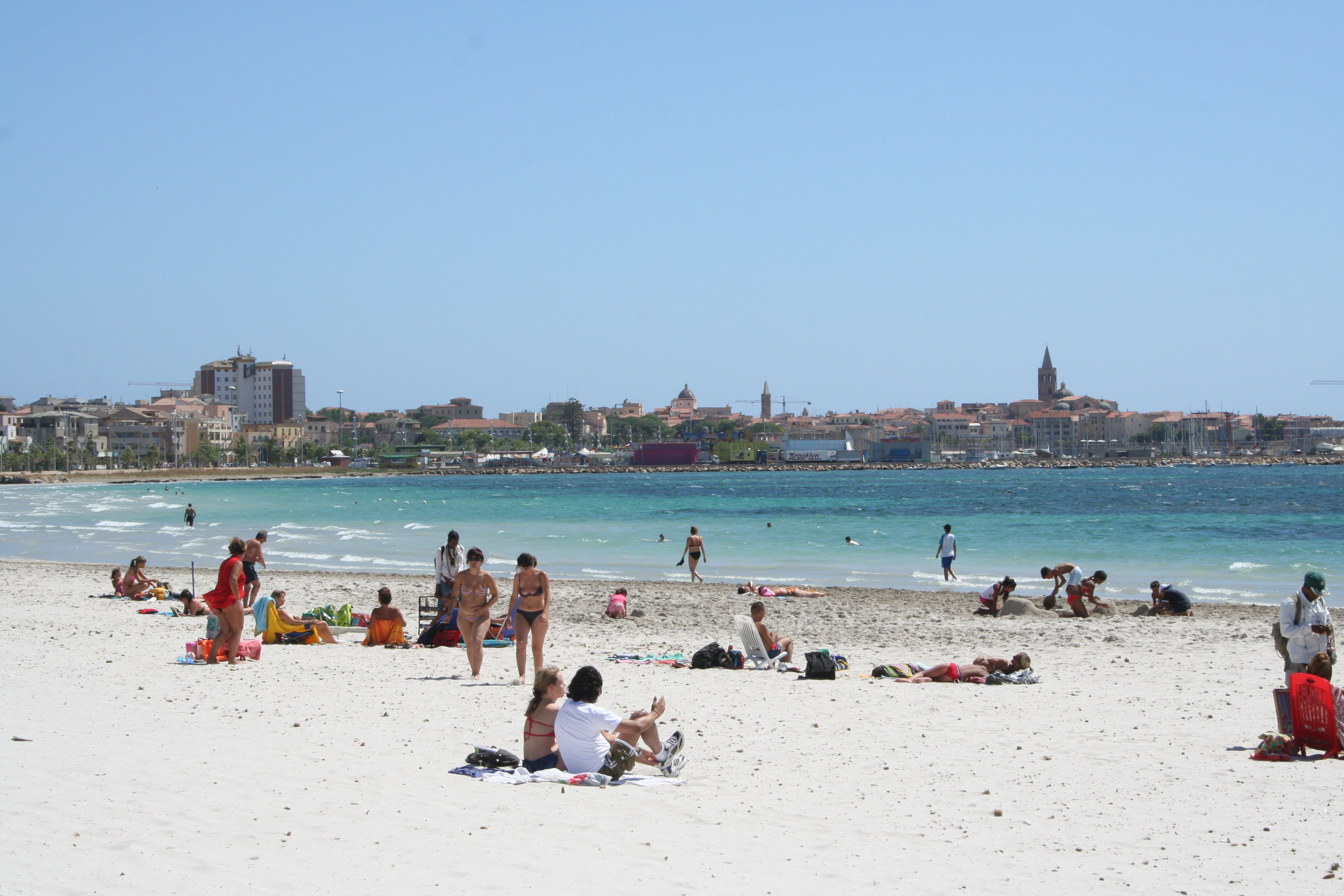
Spiaggia del Lido di Alghero, the host beach of the 2018 Superfinal and Promotion Final

Matches are listed as local time in Alghero, CEST (UTC+2)

All matches took place at a purpose built stadium on Spiaggia del Lido di San Giovanni, with a capacity of approximately 1,500.

The winners of the Promotion Final earned a place in Division A next season; they also qualified for the 2019 European Games.

(Note two teams were ineligible to qualify to the European Games: Germany, as the team that finished 12th in Division A and Kazakhstan, who are not a member of the European Olympic Committees. In the event one of these teams was to win the Promotion Final, the next highest ranked eligible team would qualify in their place.)

=== Qualified teams ===
The teams in bold qualified as Division B regular season group winners; those in italics qualified as the three best group runners-up.

The team in green attempted to retain their position in Division A, having finished bottom of the regular season table.

- **England**
- **Bulgaria**
- **Kazakhstan**^{1}
- **Romania**
- Hungary
- Norway
- Moldova
- Germany^{2} (Last place, Division A)

Notes:

1. First appearance in Promotion Final
2. First appearance as defending Division A team in Promotion Final

=== Group stage ===
Key: Advance to –	Final /	3rd place match /	5th place match /	7th place match

==== Group 1 ====
Pos	Team	Pld	W	W+	WP	L	GF	GA	GD	Pts
1	Germany	3	3	0	0	0	16	4	+12	**9**
2	Kazakhstan	3	2	0	0	1	12	8	+4	**6**
3	Hungary	3	1	0	0	2	9	15	–6	**3**
4	Moldova	3	0	0	0	3	7	17	–10	**0**

6 September 2018	**Kazakhstan**	**5–3**	**Hungary**
10:15	Muralinov 10', 15', 24'; Perevyortov 13'; Demeshko 17'	Report(ru)	13' Fekete; 24', 27' Rutai	Referee: Dario Minder (Switzerland)

6 September 2018	**Moldova**	**2–6**	**Germany**
12:45	Florea 15'; Schiopu 21'	Report(ru)	3', 30' Svenson; 12' Biermann; 12' (o.g.) Schiopu; 15' Schmitt; 27' Basiel	Referee: Sergio Gomes Soares (Portugal)

7 September 2018	**Kazakhstan**	**6–2**	**Moldova**
10:15	Muralinov 21', 34' (pen.); Makagon 22'; Chornyy 33'; Yeraly 36'; Tyulpa 36'	Report(ru)	22' Cojocari; 26' Ignat	Referee: Francisco De Oses Bumedien (Spain)

7 September 2018	**Germany**	**7–1**	**Hungary**
12:45	Basiel 4', 16' (pen.), 18'; Biermann 8'; Weirauch 21'; Svenson 29'; Schmitt 36'	Report(ru)	19' Menyhei	Referee: Ingilab Mammadov (Azerbaijan)

8 September 2018	**Hungary**	**5–3**	**Moldova**
10:15	Rutai 5', 32'; Besenyei 12'; Menyhei 21'; Fekete 25'	Report(ru)	2', 29' Ignat; 20' Schiopu	Referee: Dario Minder (Switzerland)

8 September 2018	**Germany**	**3–1**	**Kazakhstan**
12:45	Basiel 7'; Svenson 35' (pen.); Metzler 35'	Report(ru)	7' Makazhanov	Referee: Antonio Pereira (Portugal)

==== Group 2 ====
Pos	Team	Pld	W	W+	WP	L	GF	GA	GD	Pts
1	Romania	3	2	0	0	1	15	7	+8	**6**
2	Bulgaria	3	1	0	1	1	10	14	–4	**4**
3	England	3	0	1	1	1	10	9	+1	**3**
4	Norway	3	0	0	0	3	9	14	–5	**0**

6 September 2018	**Bulgaria**	**1–6**	**Romania**
09:00	Lozanov 36'	Report(ru)	1' Ravoiu; 3' (pen.), 15' Boata; 20', 29' Zaharia; 36' Maciuca	Referee: Raul Martin Gonzalez Frances (Spain)

6 September 2018	**Norway**	**2–3** (a.e.t.)	**England**
11:30	H. Salveson 24'; Sorensen 35'	Report(ru)	23', 35' Younie; 38' O'Rourke	Referee: Viktor Listratov (Russia)

7 September 2018	**Bulgaria**	**5–4**	**Norway**
09:00	Tsvetkov 7'; Filipov 10', 34' (pen.); Adamov 19'; Todorov 26'	Report(ru)	3', 13' H. Salveson; 32' (pen.) Jalland; 36' Li	Referee: Torsten Guenther (Germany)

7 September 2018	**England**	**3–3** (a.e.t.) (**3–2** p)	**Romania**
11:30	Lawson 5', 37'; Clarke 16'	Report(ru)	18', 38' Tanase; 31' Andrei Paul	Referee: Alfredo Pavone (Italy)
	**Penalties**
	Maxwell (penalty scored); Morris (penalty scored); Clarke (penalty missed); O'Rourke (penalty scored)		(penalty missed) Maciuca; (penalty scored) Alin; (penalty scored) Boata; (penalty missed) Tanase

8 September 2018	**Romania**	**6–3**	**Norway**
09:00	Maciuca 16', 24', 36'; Zaharia 23', 30'; Andrei Paul 27'	Report(ru)	2' Jalland; 15', 18' E. Salveson	Referee: Viktor Listratov (Russia)

8 September 2018	**England**	**4–4** (a.e.t.) (**0–2** p)	**Bulgaria**
11:30	Clarke 14'; O'Rourke 21'; Farquharson 30'; Younie 37'	Report(ru)	4', 33' (pen.), 36' Filipov; 28' Tsvetkov	Referee: Gionni Matticoli (Italy)
	**Penalties**
	O'Rourke (penalty missed); Morris (penalty missed)		(penalty scored) Tsvetkov; (penalty scored) Filipov

=== Play-off stage ===
==== Seventh place play-off ====
9 September 2018
09:00

Moldova	4–4 (a.e.t.)	Norway
Capsamun 15', 15'; Eremia 18'; Ignat 38' (pen.)	Report(ru)	3' Salveson; 15' Sorensen; 22' Li; 37' Jalland
Penalties
Ignat (penalty scored); Kozhokar (penalty missed)	1–3	(penalty scored) Jalland; (penalty scored) Sorensen; (penalty scored) Salveson

Referee: Oezcan Sultanolu (Turkey)

==== Fifth place play-off ====
9 September 2018
10:15

Hungary	4–2	England
Besenyei 9'; Szentes-Biro 22'; Rutai 30', 36' (pen.)	Report(ru)	8' (o.g.) Fekete; 29' Clarke

Referee: Viktor Listratov (Russia)

==== Third place play-off ====
9 September 2018
11:30

Kazakhstan	4–3	Bulgaria
Chapanov 8'; Demeshko 21'; Muralinov 22'; Perevyortov 24'	Report(ru)	21', 33' Filipov; 22' Dimov

Referee: Torsten Günther (Germany)

==== Promotion play-off final ====
9 September 2018
15:15

Germany	4–4 (a.e.t.)	Romania
Biermann 1'; Basiel 9' (pen.); Metzler 21'; Svenson 28'	Report(ru)	4', 32', 34' Maciuca; 30' Andrei Paul
Penalties
Metzler (penalty scored); Biermann (penalty missed); Weirauch (penalty scored); Svenson (penalty scored); Basiel (penalty scored)	4–3	(penalty scored) Maciuca; (penalty missed) Alin; (penalty scored) Boata; (penalty scored) Tanase; (penalty missed) Andrei Paul

Referee: Sergio Gomes Soares (Portugal)

=== Final standings ===
Germany won the event to retain their Division A status for the 2019 EBSL season; this was just the second time in ten attempts since the Promotion Final was introduced that the defending Division A team successfully won it to preserve their top tier membership (the other France in 2011). Consequently, no Division B team earned promotion to the top division and no Division A team was relegated this year.

Romania claimed the single qualification berth to the 2019 European Games available in the Promotion Final as the highest ranked team eligible to qualify in the final standings.

Key:
Green text	The defending Division A team
	Qualified to 2019 European Games
■	Ineligible to qualify for 2019 European Games^{[see note]}

Pos	Team	Outcome
**1**	Germany ■	**Retained spot in 2019 EBSL Division A**
2	Romania	Remain in Division B
3	Kazakhstan ■	Remain in Division B
4	Bulgaria	Remain in Division B
5	Hungary	Remain in Division B
6	England	Remain in Division B
7	Norway	Remain in Division B
8	Moldova	Remain in Division B

== Superfinal (Alghero, 6–9 September) ==
Matches are listed as local time in Alghero, CEST (UTC+2)

All matches took place at a purpose built stadium on Spiaggia del Lido di San Giovanni, with a capacity of approximately 1,500.

The winners of the Superfinal were crowned 2018 EBSL champions; the top six (excl. Belarus as they qualified automatically as Games hosts) also earned qualification to the 2019 European Games.

=== Qualified teams ===
The top eight teams from Division A, as per the end of regular season league table, qualified for the Superfinal.

- Spain
- Russia
- Belarus
- Portugal
- Ukraine
- Switzerland
- Italy (hosts)
- Azerbaijan^{1}

Notes:

1. First appearance in Superfinal

=== Group stage ===
Key: Advance to –	Final /	3rd place match /	5th place match /	7th place match /	(H) Hosts

==== Group 1 ====
Pos	Team	Pld	W	W+	WP	L	GF	GA	GD	Pts
1	Spain	3	3	0	0	0	13	10	+3	9
2	Portugal	3	2	0	0	1	19	8	+11	6
3	Switzerland	3	1	0	0	2	15	16	–1	3
4	Azerbaijan	3	0	0	0	3	9	22	–13	0

6 September 2018	Portugal	7–4	Switzerland
14:00	Léo Martins 1', 2'; Andrade 5'; Bruno Novo 17'; Santos 20'; Bê Martins 21', 35'	Report(ru)	7' Ott; 15', 35' (pen.) Stankovic; 18' Hodel	Referee: Gionni Matticoli (Italy)

6 September 2018	Azerbaijan	4–5	Spain
16:30	A. Aliyev 17'; R. Aliyev 22'; O. Mammadov 22'; Zeynalov 34'	Report(ru)	6' Adrian; 22' Antonio; 23' Cintas; 26' (pen.) Llorenç; 30' Chicky	Referee: Torsten Guenther (Germany)

7 September 2018	Portugal	9–0	Azerbaijan
14:00	Torres 6', 16' (pen.); Coimbra 8' (pen.), 9'; Santos 14'; Madjer 17'; Léo Martins 22' (pen.); Belchior 30', 35'	Report(ru)		Referee: Vladimir Tashkov (Bulgaria)

7 September 2018	Spain	4–3	Switzerland
16:30	Suárez 7'; Antonio 17', 32'; Llorenç 35'	Report(ru)	2', 22', 22' Stankovic	Referee: Eduards Borisevics (Latvia)

8 September 2018	Switzerland	8–5	Azerbaijan
14:00	Borer 7', 29'; Ott 14', 14', 25'; Misev 20', 28'; Ostgen 34'	Report(ru)	5' R. Mammadov; 7', 11', 14' R. Aliyev; 7' A. Aliyev	Referee: Sergio Gomes Soares (Portugal)

8 September 2018	Spain	4–3	Portugal
16:30	Cintas 2'; Antonio 14'; Llorenç 25', 32'	Report(ru)	12' Madjer; 12' (pen.) Belchoir; 22' Leo Martins	Referee: Jude Amin Utulu (Malta)

==== Group 2 ====
Pos	Team	Pld	W	W+	WP	L	GF	GA	GD	Pts
1	Italy (H)	3	1	2	0	0	17	14	+3	7
2	Russia	3	2	0	0	1	13	7	+6	6
3	Belarus	3	0	1	0	2	7	8	–1	2
4	Ukraine	3	0	0	0	3	6	14	–8	0

6 September 2018	Russia	6–0	Ukraine
15:15	Makarov 4'; Zemskov 4', 10', 28'; Krash 27'; Paporotnyi 36'	Report(ru)		Referee: Laurynas Arzuolaitis (Latvia)

6 September 2018	Belarus	4–5	Italy
17:45	Bokach 8'; Savich 24'; Bryshtel 30' (pen.), 31' (pen.)	Report(ru)	4' (pen.) Gori; 20', 27' Chiavaro; 29' Zurlo; 36' Ramacciotti	Referee: Sofien Benchabane (France)

7 September 2018	Belarus	2–1 (a.e.t.)	Ukraine
15:15	Bryshtel 36'; Bokach 37'	Report(ru)	21' Pachev	Referee: Oezcan Sultanolu (Turkey)

7 September 2018	Italy	6–5 (a.e.t.)	Russia
17:45	Ramacciotti 10', 24'; Gori 13', 28'; Zurlo 30'; Marinai 38'	Report(ru)	9' Shishin; 15' Zemskov; 19' Novikov; 22' Krash; 25' Paporotnyi	Referee: Jude Amin Utulu (Malta)

8 September 2018	Russia	2–1	Belarus
15:15	Romanov 8'; Krash 27'	Report(ru)	15' Bryshtel	Referee: Eduards Borisevics (Latvia)

8 September 2018	Ukraine	5–6 (a.e.t.)	Italy
17:45	Khyzhniak 17', 23' (pen.); Makeiev 29', 32'; Glutskyi 35' (pen.)	Report(ru)	10', 15', 23', 37' Gori; 11' (pen.) Zurlo; 19' di Palma	Referee: Sofien Benchabane (France)

=== Play-off stage ===
==== Seventh place play-off ====
9 September 2018
12:45

Azerbaijan	1–5	Ukraine
R. Nazarov 14'	Report(ru)	6' Voitenko; 10', 31' Glutskiy; 28' Pashko; 36' Khyzhniak

Referee: Raul Martin Gonzalez Frances (Spain)

==== Fifth place play-off ====
9 September 2018
14:00

Switzerland	5–7	Belarus
Ott 2'; Misev 13'; Stankovic 28' (pen.), 33'; Steinemann 36'	Report(ru)	2', 25' (pen.), 26', 34' Bryshtel; 23', 27' (pen.) Hapon; 34' Savich

Referee: Ingilab Mammadov (Azerbaijan)

==== Third place play-off ====
9 September 2018
16:30

Portugal	4–4 (a.e.t.)	Russia
Belchior 31', 36', 39'; Santos 36'	Report(ru)	9' Nikonorov; 18', 38' Zemskov; 36' Shishin
Penalties
Madjer (penalty scored); Coimbra (penalty scored); Santos (penalty scored)	3–2	(penalty scored) Romanov; (penalty missed) Paporotnyi; (penalty scored) Shishin

Referee: Vladimir Tashkov (Bulgaria)

==== Superfinal match ====
9 September 2018
17:45

Spain	2–2 (a.e.t.)	Italy
Llorenç 22', 33'	Report(ru)	19' Frainetti; 33' (pen.) Palmacci
Penalties
Llorenç (penalty scored); Antonio (penalty scored); Chiky (penalty scored); Cintas (penalty scored); Suarez (penalty scored); Adrian (penalty scored); José Enrique (penalty missed)	6–7	(penalty scored) Chiavaro; (penalty scored) Gori; (penalty scored) Zurlo; (penalty scored) Corosiniti; (penalty scored) Frainetti; (penalty scored) Palazzolo; (penalty scored) Palmacci

Attendance: 1,500
Referee: Antonio Pereira (Portugal)

===== Post-match reactions =====
Italian goalkeeper Simone Del Mestre on his save of Jose Enrique's penalty that won the game:

"I won everything with Sambenedettese [his club team], but nothing compares to this. Before the final penalty, I turned towards the stand and I said ‘I’ve got this’. I can’t remember much after the save, but I just remember running like crazy all across the pitch."

Italian captain, Francesco Corosiniti:

"This group has managed to perform at a high level for a number of years, but to actually win is something entirely different. It was the climax of everything after Simone’s save and I can say without a doubt that we deserved this victory after all of the sacrifices that we made."

Spanish coach, Joaquín González:

"You have to be proud of the work done." "We deserved to win the final against Italy."

=== Awards ===
==== Winners trophy ====
2018 Euro Beach Soccer League
champions

Italy
Second title

==== Individual awards ====
Awarded for feats achieved in the Superfinal only

Top scorer
(Belarus) Ihar Bryshtel
8 goals
Best player
(Spain) Llorenç Gomez
Best goalkeeper
(Italy) Simone Del Mestre

=== Final standings ===
Finalists Spain and Italy faced each other for the first time in an EBSL title-decider; both teams were appearing in their second finals (the others 2014 and 2010 respectively) since they each last won their most recent titles (2006 and 2005 respectively). It was also just the second time (the other Spain vs. France, 2003) that neither Russia nor Portugal reached the final.

By winning the Superfinal, Italy ended a 13-year drought (the then current longest wait of any team with a previous title win) to claim their second EBSL crown; both titles were won on penalties. After nine successive wins, including claiming first place in the regular season, this was Spain's first loss of the season; their wait for a sixth title now continues into its 13th year.

Belarus' 5th-place finish was their joint best result (with 2016); the sixth European Games qualifier was therefore decided in the seventh place play-off between Ukraine and Azerbaijan, won by the former.

Key:
Qualified to 2019 European Games
Qualified to 2019 European Games automatically as host nation of the Games

Pos	Team	Result
1	Italy	EBSL Champions (2nd title)
2	Spain	Runners-up
3	Portugal	Third place
4	Russia	
5	Belarus	
6	Switzerland	
7	Ukraine	
8	Azerbaijan	

== Season statistics ==
=== Top scorers ===
The following tables list the top 12 scorers in each division, including goals scored in both the regular and post season events. Note there is no award presented for these season-encompassing scoring feats, the tables are for statistical purposes only. Scoring awards were bestowed per stage, with the primary award that which was presented in the Superfinal.

==== Division A ====
Rank	Player	Pld	Goals
1	(Switzerland) Noël Ott	9	18
2	(Spain) Llorenç Gómez	10	15
3	(Switzerland) Dejan Stanković	8	14
4	(Italy) Gabriele Gori	9	12
4	(Belarus) Ihar Bryshtel	10	12
4	(Spain) Antonio Mayor	10	12
7	(Russia) Fedor Zemskov	7	10
7	(Belarus) Ilia Savich	10	10
9	(Ukraine) Oleksandr Korniichuk	6	9
9	(Spain) Salavador "Chiky" Ardil	10	9
11	(Poland) Tomasz Późniak	6	8
11	(Germany) Christian Biermann^{†}	10	8
11	(Italy) Emmanuele Zurlo	10	8
11	(Portugal) Rui Coimbra	10	8
11	(Russia) Yury Krasheninnikov	10	8
11	(Portugal) Leo Martins	10	8
11	(Switzerland) Glenn Hodel	10	8
11	(Russia) Dmitry Shishin	10	8

†. Includes 3 goals scored in the Promotion Final vs. Division B teams.

==== Division B ====
Rank	Player	Pld	Goals
1	(Bulgaria) Filip Filipov	7	16
2	(England) Aaron Clarke	7	12
2	(Kazakhstan) Bayanbek Muralinov	7	12
4	(Romania) Marian Maciuca	6	10
5	(England) Cameron O'Rourke	7	9
6	(Hungary) Balazs Rutai	7	8
7	(Hungary) Ferenc Besenyei	7	7
7	(Kazakhstan) Dmitriy Perevyortov	7	7
7	(Norway) Henrik Salveson	7	7
7	(England) Jake Younie	7	7
11	(Romania) Ionel Florea "Boata"	6	6
11	(Moldova) Nicolai Ignat	7	6
11	(Moldova) Grigorii Cojocari	7	6
11	(Norway) Johan Elverum Salveson	7	6

=== Most assists ===
The following tables list the top 10 assistants in each division including assists provided in both the regular and post season events.

==== Division A ====
Rank	Player	Pld	Assists
1	(Switzerland) Noël Ott	9	7
2	(Belarus) Ihar Bryshtel	10	6
3	(Switzerland) Mo Jaeggy	8	5
3	(Spain) Dona	9	5
3	(Belarus) Ivan Kanstantsinau	9	5
3	(Portugal) Be Martins	9	5
3	(Spain) Llorenç Gómez	10	5
3	(Spain) Antonio Mayor	10	5
3	(Switzerland) Michael Misev	10	5
3	(Italy) Dario Ramacciotti	10	5
3	(Russia) Dmitry Shishin	10	5
3	(Russia) Anton Shkarin	10	5

==== Division B ====
Rank	Player	Pld	Assists
1	(Romania) Andrei Paul Neag	6	7
2	(Bulgaria) Kaloyan Tsvetkov	7	6
3	(Norway) Henrik Salveson	7	5
4	(England) Scott Lawson	6	4
4	(Bulgaria) Martin Velikov	7	4
4	(Kazakhstan) Dmitriy Perevyortov	7	4
4	(Hungary) Tamas Szentes-Biro	7	4
8	(Greece) Spyridon Gkritzalis	3	3
8	(Hungary) Balazs Rutai	7	3
8	(Hungary) Ferenc Besenyei	7	3
8	(England) Aaron Clarke	7	3
8	(Hungary) Benjamin Lipok	7	3
8	(Norway) Tom-Rune Sørensen	7	3
8	(Bulgaria) Filip Filipov	7	3

Note regarding the recording of assists:
The source of these assists stats does not explain what system was used to determine the award of an assist. The total no. of assists recorded is 341 but 714 goals were scored. The discrepancy of the source not recording an assist for every goal scored may be due to a system in use such as FIFAs assists system – (regardless of who made the final pass to the scorer, no assist is awarded when the scorer ultimately lays the goal on for him/herself via a dribble, solo run etc., scores after intercepting an opponent's pass etc.). However, since the system in use is not explained, note that assists may simply of gone undocumented.

=== Discipline ===
The following table lists the players and teams who received the most penalties for disciplinary infringements in each division in both the regular and post season events.

Category	Division	Player(s)	#	Team(s)	#
Most yellow cards (yellow card)	A	(Portugal) Bruno Torres (Belarus) Ivan Kanstantsinau	4	Belarus	20
Most yellow cards (yellow card)	B	(Bulgaria) Pavel Adamov	3	Bulgaria	9
Second yellow cards (yellow card) (yellow-red card)	A	(Switzerland) Phillipp Borer	1	Switzerland	1
Second yellow cards (yellow card) (yellow-red card)	B	(Bulgaria) Pavel Adamov (Kazakhstan) Dmitriy Perevyortov (Romania) Daniel Zaharia (Kazakhstan) Abylay Yearly	1	Kazakhstan	2
Straight red cards (red card)	A	(Portugal) Elinton Andrade (Azerbaijan) Elchin Gasimov (Portugal) Be Martins (Belarus) Yury Cherkasau	1	Portugal	2
Straight red cards (red card)	B	(Kazakhstan) Viktor Chornyy (Hungary) László Szacksó (Andorra) Marc Ibanez	1	Kazakhstan; Hungary; Andorra	1
