= Italy national beach soccer team =

Italy
- Nickname: Gli Azzurri (The Blues)
- Association: Federazione Italiana Giuoco Calcio
- Confederation: UEFA (Europe)
- Head coach: Emiliano Del Duca
- Captain: Francesco Corosiniti
- Most caps: Francesco Corosiniti (142)
- Top scorer: Gabriele Gori (340)
- FIFA code: ITA
- BSWW ranking: 2 ▲1 (1 June 2026)
First colours
Second colours

First international
- Italy 7–6 Uruguay (Rio de Janeiro, Brazil; 24 January 1995)

Biggest win
- Italy 16–6 Algeria (Pescara, Italy; 3 September 2005)

Biggest defeat
- Brazil 14–1 Italy (Rio de Janeiro, Brazil; 16 January 1998)

World Cup
- Appearances: 8 (first in 1995)
- Best result: (silver) Runners-up (2008, 2019, 2024)

Euro Beach Soccer League
- Appearances: 22 (first in 1998)
- Best result: (gold) Champions (2005, 2018, 2023, 2025)

Euro Beach Soccer Cup
- Appearances: 14 (first in 1998)
- Best result: (silver) Runners-up (2016)

The Italy national beach soccer team represents Italy in international beach soccer competitions and is controlled by the Italian Football Federation, the governing body for football in Italy.

== Competitive record ==
=== FIFA Beach Soccer World Cup Qualification (UEFA) ===
FIFA Beach Soccer World Cup Qualification Record
Year	Result	Pld	W	WE	WP	L	GS	GA	Dif	Pts
(Spain) 2008	2nd Place	6	4	0	1	1	27	18	+9	13
(Spain) 2009	5th Place	7	6	0	0	1	49	26	+23	18
(Italy) 2011	Round of 16	3	2	0	0	1	10	7	+3	6
(Russia) 2013	Round of 16	4	2	0	1	1	17	15	+2	6
(Italy) 2015	4th Place	8	5	1	1	1	43	25	+18	18
(Italy) 2017	4th Place	8	6	0	0	2	39	30	+18	18
(Russia) 2019	2nd Place	7	5	0	0	2	41	17	+20	20
(Portugal) 2021	7th Place	6	4	0	0	2	30	18	+3	6
(United Arab Emirates) 2023	2nd Place	6	4	0	0	2	22	21	+4	12
Total	9/9	53	36	1	3	13	269	174	+100	111

== Current squad ==
Note: Flags indicate national team as defined under FIFA eligibility rules; some limited exceptions apply. Players may hold more than one non-FIFA nationality.

No.	Pos.	Nation	Player
12	GK		Leandro Casapieri
5	DF		Josep Junior Gentilin
4	DF		Gianmarco Genovali
13	DF		Luca Bertacca
8	DF		Francesco Corosiniti (captain)
9	FW		Emmanuele Zurlo
10	FW		Gabriele Gori

No.	Pos.	Nation	Player
11	FW		Paolo Palmacci
13	DF		Alfio Luca Chiavaro
17	MF		Pietro Angelo Palazzolo
18	MF		Fabio Sciacca
20	MF		Alessio Frainetti
21	MF		Michele Di Palma
22	GK		Simone Del Mestre

Coach: Emiliano Del Luca

== Achievements ==
Euro Beach Soccer League

- Champion

2005, 2018, 2023, 2025

- Runners-up

1998, 2010

FIFA Beach Soccer World Cup

- Runners-up

2008, 2019, 2024
