= 2019 Euro Beach Soccer League =

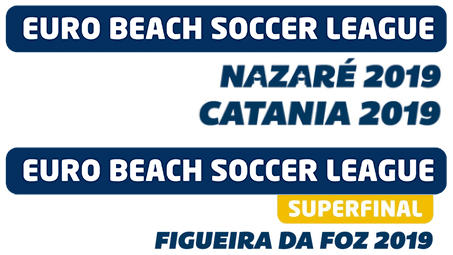
- Composite image of the banner style logos used during the 2019 EBSL. At each regular season stage, the main EBSL banner is joined solely by the subtitle corresponding to that stage.

Tournament details
- Host countries: Portugal; Italy
- Dates: 5 July – 8 September
- Teams: 28 (from 1 confederation)
- Venue: 3 (in 3 host cities)

Final positions
- Champions: Portugal (6th title)
- Runners-up: Russia
- Third place: Spain
- Fourth place: Italy

Tournament statistics
- Matches played: 71
- Goals scored: 566 (7.97 per match)

Locations of the two stages and the Superfinal of the 2019 Euro Beach Soccer League

The 2019 Euro Beach Soccer League (EBSL) was the 22nd edition of the Euro Beach Soccer League, the annual, premier competition in European beach soccer contested between men's national teams. It was organised by Beach Soccer Worldwide (BSWW), in a league and play-off format.

This season, the competing teams continued to take part in two divisions: the top tier (Division A) and the bottom tier (Division B). 12 teams continued to contest Division A; all twelve teams returned from last season's top tier as none were relegated. Division B accommodated a record 16 nations: 14 nations who did not gain promotion from last season, Finland who made their debut, and the Netherlands who returned after an absence from competing in recent years.

Due to the saturated 2019 international beach soccer calendar for European teams, this season was shortened considerably compared to the usual program. A total of just two stages of fixtures were scheduled during the regular season. Each team from Division A played in just one stage (compared to the usual two) whilst each team in Division B also played in one. At each stage the participating nations earned points for the overall league tables.

At the end of the regular season, according to the league tables, the eight best teams in Division A advanced to the post-season event, the Superfinal, to compete to become the winners of this year's EBSL. Meanwhile, the top seven teams in Division B (the four group winners and three best runners-up) and the team ranked bottom of Division A played in a different post-season event, the Promotion Final, to try to earn a spot in Division A next year.

Azerbaijan, the defending Division A team in the Promotion Final, beat Kazakhstan in the final to win the event, therefore retaining their Division A status for next season; for the second year running, no Division B nation earned promotion. Italy were the defending champions but were knocked out of title-winning contention in the group stage of the Superfinal, ultimately finishing fourth in the post-season event. The concluding match of the Superfinal was contested between Russia and Portugal, who were both looking to claim a record sixth European title. Portugal, on home sand, came from 2–0 down to win the match and claim their sixth EBSL crown.

== Calendar and locations ==
The calendar below was revealed on 18 March 2019.

Similarly to the 2008 and 2015 editions, this season's regular season schedule was truncated, down to just two stages, in order to accommodate the additional events taking up space in the international calendar, including Division A teams competing in just one stage each, compared to the usual two stages.

Phase	Dates	Country	City	Stage	Divisions	
Regular season	5–7 July	Portugal	Nazaré	Stage 1	A	B
Regular season	16–18 August	Italy	Catania	Stage 2	A	B
Postseason/ Finals	5–8 September	Portugal	Figueira da Foz	Superfinal	A	
Postseason/ Finals	5–8 September	Portugal	Figueira da Foz	Promotion Final		B

== Teams ==
Competing in Division A Competing in Division B Competed in previous editions but not this year Never competed in the EBSL

The following 28 teams entered this season, divided into divisions A and B as shown (12 in Division A, 16 in Division B).

The numbers in parentheses show the European ranking of each team prior to the start of the season, out of 36 nations.

=== Division A ===
- Portugal (1st)
- Russia (2nd)
- Italy (3rd)
- Spain (4th)
- Switzerland (5th)
- Ukraine (6th)
- Poland (7th)
- Belarus (8th)
- France (9th)
- Germany (10th)
- Azerbaijan (12th)
- Turkey (15th)

=== Division B ===
- Czech Republic (11th)
- England (13th)
- Hungary (14th)
- Greece (16th)
- Romania (17th)
- Norway (18th)
- Estonia (19th)
- Kazakhstan (20th)
- Moldova (21st)
- Serbia (22nd)
- Bulgaria (23rd)
- Lithuania (24th)
- Denmark (25th)
- Netherlands (26th)
- Georgia (28th)
- Finland^{1} (n/a)

Notes:

1. Teams making their debut

== Stage 1 (Nazaré, 5–7 July) ==
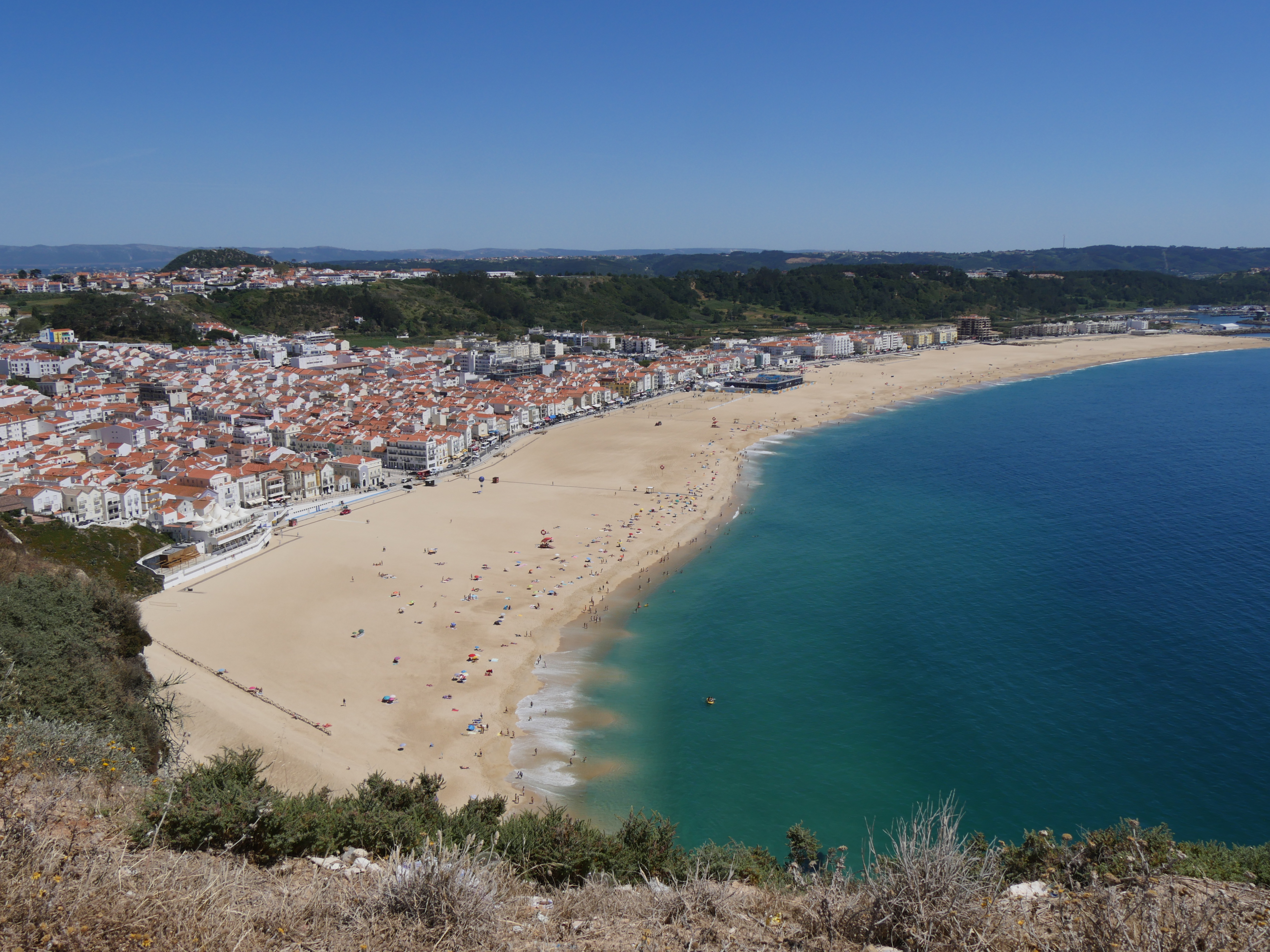
Praia de Nazaré

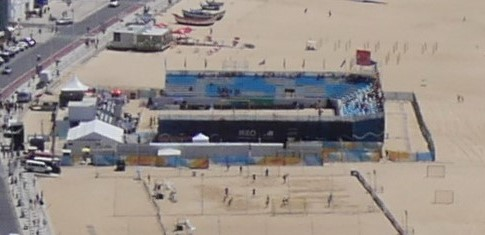
Estádio do Viveiro

Matches are listed as local time in Nazaré, WEST (UTC+1)

All matches took place at the Estádio do Viveiro on Praia de Nazaré (Nazaré Beach), in tandem with the hosting of the 2019 Women's Euro Beach Soccer Cup. The area has a capacity of 2,200.

During this round, Georgia won their first ever matches in the EBSL, ultimately leading to a first stage title (in either division), meanwhile Spain reached a milestone of winning their 25th stage title. Goalkeeper Valentin Jaeggy made his 300th appearance for Switzerland on day 3, marked with a commemorative jersey presented on-field by fellow players.

=== Division A ===
==== Group 1 ====
Key:	Group winners /	(H)	Hosts

Pos	Team	Pld	W	W+	WP	L	GF	GA	GD	Pts
1	Portugal (H)	3	2	1	0	0	14	9	+5	8
2	Ukraine	3	2	0	0	1	9	8	+1	6
3	Switzerland	3	0	1	0	2	19	21	–2	2
4	Poland	3	0	0	0	3	7	11	–4	0

5 July 2019	Switzerland	5–7	Ukraine
16:15	Borer 1', 1'; Ott 3'; Stanković 28', 32'	Report(ru)	4', 26', 36' Shcherytsia; 5' Pachev; 28', 33', 35' Makeiev	Referee: Vitalij Gomolko (Lithuania)

5 July 2019	Poland	1–3	Portugal
20:00	Madani 36'	Report(ru)	8' Gonçalves; 14' Jordan; 22' Bê Martins	Referee: Saverio Bottalico (Italy)

6 July 2019	Switzerland	7–6 (a.e.t.)	Poland
14:00	Stanković 8', 25', 27'; Hodel 16', 27', 30'; Borer 37'	Report(ru)	1' Marciniak; 1', 4', 31' Jesionowski; 2' Gac; 35' Madani	Referee: Jesus Montoro (Spain)

6 July 2019	Portugal	3–1	Ukraine
20:30	Jordan 6'; Bruno Torres 16'; Belchior 20'	Report(ru)	10' Zavorotnyi	Referee: Oezcan Sultanolu (Turkey)

7 July 2019	Ukraine	1–0	Poland
15:30	Zavorotnyi 17'	Report(ru)		Referee: Attila Balint (Romania)

7 July 2019	Portugal	8–7 (a.e.t.)	Switzerland
20:30	Goncalves 7'; Andrade 10', 20'; Leo Martins 12', 39'; Jordan 13', 25', 39'	Report(ru)	1', 39' Hodel; 4' Ostgen; 7', 9', 10' Stanković; 27' Jäggy	Referee: Saverio Bottalico (Italy)

==== Group 2 ====
Key:	Group winners

Pos	Team	Pld	W	W+	WP	L	GF	GA	GD	Pts
1	Spain	3	3	0	0	0	14	3	+11	9
2	Russia	3	1	0	1	1	9	7	+2	4
3	Turkey	3	1	0	0	2	10	13	–3	3
4	Azerbaijan	3	0	0	0	3	5	15	–10	0

5 July 2019	Russia	3–3 (a.e.t.) (3–2 p)	Azerbaijan
17:30	Fedorov 11'; Nikonorov 29'; Stepliani 36'	Report(ru)	3' Allahguliyev; 21' Manafov; 31' Nazarov	Referee: Antonio Pereira (Portugal)
	Penalties
	Krasheninnikov (penalty scored); Paporotnyi (penalty scored); Nikonorov (penalty scored)		(penalty scored) Zeynalov; (penalty scored) Allahguliyev; (penalty missed) Mammadov

5 July 2019	Turkey	2–6	Spain
18:45	Keskin 6', 29'	Report(ru)	7', 20' Frutos; 11', 15' Mayor; 12' Suárez; 33' Garcia	Referee: Sergio Filipe Soares (Portugal)

6 July 2019	Russia	5–2	Turkey
15:30	Raskin 10' (pen.); Fedorov 10'; Zharikov 17'; Nikonorov 21', 33'	Report(ru)	6' Yesilirmak; 18' Keskin	Referee: Attila Balint (Romania)

6 July 2019	Spain	6–0	Azerbaijan
19:15	Suarez 6', 13', 28'; Chiky 8', 17', 32'	Report(ru)		Referee: Luca Romani (Italy)

7 July 2019	Azerbaijan	2–6	Turkey
16:45	Gasimov 12'; Allahguliyev 12'	Report(ru)	8', 25', 35' Terzioglu; 17', 24' Keskin; 36' Türkmen	Referee: Antonio Pereira (Portugal)

7 July 2019	Spain	2–1	Russia
18:00	Mayor 4'; Dona 22'	Report(ru)	15' Nikonorov	Referee: Sergio Filipe Soares (Portugal)

=== Division B ===
Key:	Group winners

Pos	Team	Pld	W	W+	WP	L	GF	GA	GD	Pts
1	Georgia	3	2	0	0	1	12	10	+2	6
2	Bulgaria	3	2	0	0	1	12	8	+4	6
3	Norway	3	1	0	0	2	8	12	–4	3
4	Denmark	3	1	0	0	2	8	10	–2	3

Georgia & Bulgaria; Norway & Denmark are ranked based on their head-to-head results.

5 July 2019	Norway	4–1	Denmark
13:30	Sorensen 8', 19'; H. Salveson 10'; Li 33'	Report(ru)	13' C. Jorgensen	Referee: Oezcan Sultanolu (Turkey)

5 July 2019	Georgia	4–3	Bulgaria
14:45	Davitadze 4'; Todadze 20'; Kokoladze 23'; Shamiladze 25'	Report(ru)	8' Tsvetkov; 25' Filipov; 34' Gospodinov	Referee: Oleg Cebotari (Moldova)

6 July 2019	Norway	3–6	Georgia
11:30	Sandsor 8'; E. Salveson 32'; Sorensen 33'	Report(ru)	13' Shamiladze; 15', 18' Ivaniadze; 19' Kokoladze; 21' K. Makhadadze; 35' G. Makharadze	Referee: Emmanuel Vocale (Belgium)

6 July 2019	Bulgaria	4–3	Denmark
12:45	Filipov 7', 7', 20'; C. Jorgensen 8' (o.g.)	Report(ru)	7', 33' C. Jorgensen; 22' Kjobek	Referee: Francisco Henriques Costa (Portugal)

7 July 2019	Denmark	4–2	Georgia
12:45	Damm 3'; Raedkjaer 6', 30'; Kjobek 36'	Report(ru)	6' G. Makharadze; 14' Ivaniadze	Referee: Jesus Montoro (Spain)

7 July 2019	Norway	1–5	Bulgaria
14:00	H. Salveson 8'	Report(ru)	1' Dzhambazov; 10' Martinov; 11', 20', 30' Filipov	Referee: Jonathan Mallia (Malta)

=== Awards ===
The following were presented after the conclusion of the final day's matches. Individual awards apply to Division A only.

Stage Winners trophy		Top scorer(s)		Best player	Best goalkeeper
Spain (Division A)	Georgia (Division B)	(Switzerland) Dejan Stankovic	8 goals	(Portugal) Jordan Santos	(Spain) Dona

== Stage 2 (Catania, 16–18 August) ==
Matches are listed as local time in Catania, CEST (UTC+2)

All matches took place at the Arena Beach Stadium on the "Spiaggia libera numero 1" (Free beach number 1) section of Playa di Catania (Catania Beach), with a capacity of approximately 2,000.

Finland made their EBSL debut during this stage.

=== Division A ===
Key:	Group winners /	(H)	Hosts

Pos	Team	Pld	W	W+	WP	L	GF	GA	GD	Pts
1	Italy (H)	3	2	0	1	0	13	9	+4	7
2	Belarus	3	2	0	0	1	9	5	+4	6
3	Germany	3	0	0	1	2	13	15	–2	1
4	France	3	0	0	0	3	11	17	–6	0

16 August 2019	Belarus	4–1	France
16:45	Samsonov 6', 13' (pen.); Piatrouski 11'; Chaikouski 12'	Report(ru)	2' Fayos

16 August 2019	Germany	4–5	Italy
18:00	Körner 5'; Weirauch 18'; Biermann 20', 33'	Report(ru)	6' Ramacciotti; 12' Palmacci; 13' Marinai; 20', 21' Gori

17 August 2019	Belarus	3–2	Germany
17:00	Ryabko 16' (pen.); Chaikouski 24'; Hapon 25'	Report(ru)	19' Weirauch; 26' (pen.) Metzler

17 August 2019	France	3–6	Italy
18:00	Bru 8', 34' (pen.); Leblanc 20'	Report(ru)	8' Gori; 11', 17', 23' Palmacci; 18' Josep Jr; 19' Zurlo

18 August 2019	France	7–7 (a.e.t.) (4–5 p)	Germany
16:45	Bru 6', 8'; Soares 14'; Barbotti 18', 36'; Angeletti 24'; Dias 38'	Report(ru)	2', 10', 14', 21', 33' Körner; 5', 39' Metzler
	Penalties
	Soares (penalty missed); Gosselin (penalty missed); Angeletti (penalty missed); Leblanc (penalty scored); Fayos (penalty scored); Dias (penalty scored); Barbotti (penalty missed); Bru (penalty scored)		(penalty scored) Ebener; (penalty missed) Kniller; (penalty missed) Höveler; (penalty scored) Körner; (penalty scored) Nowak; (penalty missed) Metzler; (penalty scored) Martinez; (penalty scored) Weirauch

18 August 2019	Italy	2–2 (a.e.t.) (3–2 p)	Belarus
18:00	Palmacci 16'; Gori 27'	Report(ru)	12' Hapon; 22' Piatrouski
	Penalties
	Chiavaro (penalty scored); Gori (penalty scored); Zurlo (penalty scored)		(penalty scored) Savich; (penalty missed) Samsonov; (penalty scored) Chaikouski

=== Division B ===
==== Group 1 ====
Key:	Group winners /	Withdrew

Pos	Team	Pld	W	W+	WP	L	GF	GA	GD	Pts
1	Greece	3	3	0	0	0	11	5	+6	9
2	Romania	3	2	0	0	1	12	7	+5	6
3	Finland	3	1	0	0	2	10	12	–2	3
4	Serbia	3	0	0	0	3	0	9	–9	0

16 August 2019	Serbia	0–3 w/o	Greece
11:30		Report(ru)

16 August 2019	Finland	4–7	Romania
15:30		Report(ru)

17 August 2019	Serbia	0–3 w/o	Finland
11:30		Report(ru)

17 August 2019	Romania	2–3	Greece
15:30	Ciocanel 34' (pen.), 35'	Report(ru)	24' Mikelatos; 24' Pipinis; 28' Lympousis

18 August 2019	Greece	5–3	Finland
11:30	Mikelatos 12'; Nikolaou 18'; Katsoulis 26'; Kafantaris 30'; Lympousis 33'	Report(ru)	5' Risto; 11' Dementiev; 29' Tiira

18 August 2019	Romania	3–0 w/o	Serbia
15:30		Report(ru)

Serbia withdrew on 16 August due to administrative issues; their opponents received 3–0 walkover wins.

==== Group 2 ====
Key:	Group winners

Pos	Team	Pld	W	W+	WP	L	GF	GA	GD	Pts
1	Czech Republic	3	2	0	1	0	11	8	+3	7
2	Kazakhstan	3	2	0	0	1	14	10	+4	6
3	England	3	1	0	0	2	8	12	–4	3
4	Netherlands	3	0	0	0	3	13	16	–3	0

16 August 2019	England	1–3	Czech Republic
10:15	Lawson 21'	Report(ru)	18', 21', 26' Huráb

16 August 2019	Netherlands	5–6	Kazakhstan
14:15		Report(ru)

17 August 2019	England	5–4	Netherlands
10:15	Clarke 2', 5', 6' (pen.); O'Rourke 23' (pen.); Younie 33'	Report(ru)	3' Van Gelder; 17', 29' Van Der Bent; 33' Kampman

17 August 2019	Kazakhstan	3–3 (a.e.t.) (1–3 p)	Czech Republic
14:15	Perevyortov 4'; Demeshko 16'; Bogdanov 18'	Report(ru)	5' Pekárek; 6' Stejstal; 9' Hurab
	Penalties
	Demeshko (penalty scored); Yeraly (penalty missed)		(penalty scored) Hurab; (penalty scored) Klima; (penalty scored) Pekarek

18 August 2019	Czech Republic	5–4	Netherlands
10:15	Lukas 21', 36'; Sander 21' (o.g.); Dominik 22'; Tomas 29'	Report(ru)	9' Sander; 21', 26' Steenks; 36' Jeroen

18 August 2019	Kazakhstan	5–2	England
14:15	Muralinov 2'; Chornyy 6', 11'; Yershin 24'; Demeshko 27'	Report(ru)	17', 27' Clarke

==== Group 3 ====
Key:	Group winners

Pos	Team	Pld	W	W+	WP	L	GF	GA	GD	Pts
1	Hungary	3	2	1	0	0	14	8	+6	8
2	Estonia	3	2	0	0	1	17	14	+3	6
3	Lithuania	3	1	0	0	2	13	12	+1	3
4	Moldova	3	0	0	0	3	6	16	–10	0

16 August 2019	Moldova	5–6	Estonia
09:00		Report(ru)

16 August 2019	Lithuania	3–5	Hungary
12:45		Report(ru)

17 August 2019	Moldova	0–6	Lithuania
09:00		Report(ru)	3' Plytnikas; 6', 17' Lebedev; 7' Graiciunas; 31' (pen.), 36' Meskinis

17 August 2019	Hungary	5–4 (a.e.t.)	Estonia
12:45	Besenyei 25'; Fekete 30'; Turos 36', 39'; Rutai 38'	Report(ru)	2', 6', 37' Lepik; 2' (o.g.) Turos

18 August 2019	Estonia	7–4	Lithuania
09:00	Juha 8', 30'; Lukk 12', 15'; Stüf 13', 32'; Kigaste 24'	Report(ru)	6' Graiciunas; 10' Meskinis; 14', 20' Makutunovicius

18 August 2019	Hungary	4–1	Moldova
12:45	Fekete 17'; Besenyei 22'; Rutai 23'; Wirth 25'	Report(ru)	28' (pen.) Ignat

=== Awards ===
The following were presented after the conclusion of the final day's matches. Individual awards apply to Division A only.

Stage Winners trophy		Top scorer(s)		Best player	Best goalkeeper
Italy (Division A)	Greece (Division B)	(Germany) Sven Körner	6 goals	(Italy) Paolo Palmacci	(Belarus) Valery Makarevich

== League tables ==
At end of regular season

Ranking & tie-breaking criteria: Division A – 1. Points earned 2. Highest group placement 3. Goal difference 4. Goals scored / Division B – 1. Highest group placement 2. Points earned 3. Goal difference 4. Goals scored 5. Least yellow cards

=== Division A ===
Pos	Team	Pld	W	W+	WP	L	GF	GA	GD	Pts	Qualification
1	Spain	3	3	0	0	0	14	3	+11	9	Advance to Superfinal
2	Portugal	3	2	1	0	0	14	9	+5	8	Advance to Superfinal
3	Italy	3	2	0	1	0	13	9	+4	7	Advance to Superfinal
4	Belarus	3	2	0	0	1	9	5	+4	6	Advance to Superfinal
5	Ukraine	3	2	0	0	1	9	8	+1	6	Advance to Superfinal
6	Russia	3	1	0	1	1	9	7	+2	4	Advance to Superfinal
7	Turkey	3	1	0	0	2	10	13	–3	3	Advance to Superfinal
8	Switzerland	3	0	1	0	2	19	21	–2	2	Advance to Superfinal
9	Germany	3	0	0	1	2	13	15	–2	1	
10	Poland	3	0	0	0	3	7	11	–4	0	
11	France	3	0	0	0	3	11	17	–6	0	
12	Azerbaijan	3	0	0	0	3	5	15	–10	0	Promotion Final

=== Division B ===
Pos	Team	Pld	W	W+	WP	L	GF	GA	GD	Pts	Qualification
1	Greece (Q) ●	3	3	0	0	0	11	5	+6	9	Advance to Promotion; Final
2	Hungary (Q) ●	3	2	1	0	0	14	8	+6	8	Advance to Promotion; Final
3	Czechia (Q) ●	3	2	0	1	0	11	8	+3	7	Advance to Promotion; Final
4	Georgia (Q) ●	3	2	0	0	1	12	10	+2	6	Advance to Promotion; Final
5	Romania (q) ●	3	2	0	0	1	12	7	+5	6	Advance to Promotion; Final
6	Kazakhstan (q) ●	3	2	0	0	1	14	10	+4	6	Advance to Promotion; Final
7	Bulgaria (q) ●	3	2	0	0	1	12	8	+4	6	Advance to Promotion; Final
8	Estonia ●	3	2	0	0	1	17	14	+3	6	
9	Lithuania ●	3	1	0	0	2	13	12	+1	3	
10	Finland ●	3	1	0	0	2	10	12	–2	3	
11	Norway^{[a]} ●	3	1	0	0	2	8	12	–4	3	
12	England^{[a]} ●	3	1	0	0	2	8	12	–4	3	
13	Denmark ●	3	1	0	0	2	8	10	–2	3	
14	Netherlands ●	3	0	0	0	3	13	16	–3	0	
15	Serbia ●	3	0	0	0	3	0	9	–9	0	
16	Moldova ●	3	0	0	0	3	6	16	–10	0	

Key:
Team group placement: ● 1st place / ● 2nd place / ● 3rd place / ● 4th place
(Q) – Qualified to Promotion Final as a group winner
(q) – Qualified to Promotion Final as a best group runner-up
a. Norway received fewer yellow cards (0) than England (2).

== Promotion Final (Figueira da Foz, 5–8 September) ==
Matches are listed as local time in Figueira da Foz, WEST (UTC+1).

All matches took place at a purpose-built stadium constructed between 12 August and 3 September at the Beach Sports Complex on Praia de Buarcos (Buarcos Beach), with a capacity of 2,500.

The top seven teams from Division B and the team bottom of Division A, as per the end of regular season league tables, played in the Promotion Final; the winner earned a place in Division A in the 2020 season.

=== Qualified teams ===
The teams in bold qualified as Division B regular season group winners; those in italics qualified as the three best group runners-up.

The team in green attempted to retain their position in Division A, having finished bottom of the regular season table.

- **Greece**
- **Hungary**
- **Czech Republic**
- **Georgia**^{1}
- Romania
- Kazakhstan
- ~~Bulgaria~~ Estonia^{2}
- Azerbaijan^{3} (Last place, Division A)

Notes:

1. First appearance in Promotion Final
2. Bulgaria withdrew due to administrative issues on 2 September; they were replaced by the next best team in the Division B table, Estonia.
3. First appearance as defending Division A team in Promotion Final

=== Group stage ===
Key: Advance to –	Final /	3rd place match /	5th place match /	7th place match

==== Group 1 ====
Pos	Team	Pld	W	W+	WP	L	GF	GA	GD	Pts
1	Azerbaijan	3	2	0	0	1	11	6	+5	**6**
2	Romania	3	2	0	0	1	9	7	+2	**6**
3	Czech Republic	3	1	0	0	2	10	15	–5	**3**
4	Estonia	3	0	1	0	2	12	14	–2	**2**

5 September 2019	**Czech Republic**	**2–4**	**Romania**
10:15	Valeš 7'; Huráb 15'	Report(ru)	8' Neag; 10' Zaharia; 22', 33' Florea

5 September 2019	**Estonia**	**4–3** (a.e.t.)	**Azerbaijan**
12:45	Lepik 14', 29', 39'; Munskind 35'	Report(ru)	19' Shirinbayov; 27' Gasimov; 35' Sultanov

6 September 2019	**Czech Republic**	**7–5**	**Estonia**
10:15	Körtvélyeši 4', 13'; Huráb 14', 24'; Valeš 29', 32'; Vyhnal 35'	Report(ru)	4', 25' Palm; 19' Marmor; 31' Lepik; 35' Munskind

6 September 2019	**Azerbaijan**	**2–1**	**Romania**
12:45	Allahguliyev 9'; Nazarov 36'	Report(ru)	23' Ravoiu	Referee: Viktor Listratov (Russia)

7 September 2019	**Romania**	**4–3**	**Estonia**
10:15	Enis 9'; Neag 20'; Benciu 22'; Florea 26'	Report(ru)	7' Lepik; 23' (pen.) Palm; 36' Stüf

7 September 2019	**Azerbaijan**	**6–1**	**Czech Republic**
12:45	Allahguliyev 1'; Nazarov 14', 15'; R. Aliyev 16', 29'; A. Aliyev 33'	Report(ru)	29' (pen.) Vyhnal	Referee: Saverio Bottalico (Italy)

==== Group 2 ====
Pos	Team	Pld	W	W+	WP	L	GF	GA	GD	Pts
1	Kazakhstan	3	2	0	0	1	18	13	+5	**6**
2	Greece	3	2	0	0	1	14	9	+5	**6**
3	Hungary	3	2	0	0	1	12	12	0	**6**
4	Georgia	3	0	0	0	3	8	18	–10	**0**

5 September 2019	**Hungary**	**5–1**	**Georgia**
09:00	Todadze 1' (o.g.); Rutai 6'; Fekete 7'; Genczler 10'; Bartha 32'	Report(ru)	33' Tchviritidze

5 September 2019	**Kazakhstan**	**3–5**	**Greece**
11:30	Perevyortov 27'; Demeshko 30'; Muralinov 30'	Report(ru)	10' Papastathopolous; 15' Triantafyllidis; 18', 22', 35' Kafantaris

6 September 2019	**Hungary**	**4–9**	**Kazakhstan**
09:00	Genczler 28'; Besenyei 32', 36'; Szasz 36'	Report(ru)	5' Bogdanov; 7', 15', 27', 30' Demeshko; 18' (pen.) Yeraly; 21' (pen.), 33' Muralinov; 36' Perevyortov	Referee: Francisco de Oses Bumedien (Spain)

6 September 2019	**Greece**	**7–3**	**Georgia**
11:30	Katsoulis 5'; Lympousis 20', 31'; Khazhumia 21' (o.g.); Papastathopolous 21'; Nikolaou 22'; Kafantaris 36'	Report(ru)	17' Tchviritidze; 21' Ivaniadze; 35' Partenadze	Referee: Antonio Pereyra Almeida (Portugal)

7 September 2019	**Georgia**	**4–6**	**Kazakhstan**
09:00	Kokoladze 6', 21'; Makharadze 34' (pen.); Ivaniadze 36'	Report(ru)	1', 16' Perevyortov; 10' Abylay; 11', 35' Muralinov; 13' Azhikenov

7 September 2019	**Greece**	**2–3**	**Hungary**
11:30	Kafantaris 14'; Triantafyllidis 28' (pen.)	Report(ru)	6' (o.g.) Papastathopolous; 16', 35' Rutai

Kazakhstan, Greece & Hungary are ranked based on their head-to-head results. (GD: Kaz +3; Gre +1; Hun –4)

=== Play-off stage ===
==== Seventh place play-off ====
8 September 2019
09:00

Estonia	7–1	Georgia
Ivaniadze 1' (o.g.); Lepik 8', 31'; Kigaste 12'; Makharadze 26' (o.g.); Munskind 26'; Stüf 27'	Report(ru)	33' Kokoladze

Referee: Lukasz Ostrowski (Poland)

==== Fifth place play-off ====
8 September 2019
10:15

Czech Republic	2–4	Hungary
Stejskal 5'; Valeš 23'	Report(ru)	10' Wirth; 16' Szasz; 34' Rutai; 36' Bartha

Referee: Vladimir Tashkov (Bulgaria)

==== Third place play-off ====
8 September 2019
11:30

Romania	2–2 (a.e.t.)	Greece
Florea 3'; Benciu 10'	Report(ru)	3' Papastathopoulos; 18' Kafantaris
Penalties
Zaharia (penalty scored); Florea (penalty scored)	2–0	(penalty missed) Triantafyllidis; (penalty missed) Kafantaris

Referee: Viktor Listratov (Russia)

==== Promotion play-off final ====
8 September 2019
15:30

Azerbaijan	2–1	Kazakhstan
Manafov 6'; R. Aliyev 17'	Report(ru)	34' Bogdanov

Referee: Francisco de Oses Bumedien (Spain)

=== Final standings ===
Azerbaijan won the event to successfully retain their Division A status for the 2020 EBSL season; this was the first time since the Promotion Final was introduced in 2009 that the defending Division A team successfully won the event in consecutive seasons (following Germany's successful defence of their top tier membership in 2018).

Consequently, no Division B team earned promotion to the top division and no Division A team was relegated this year.

Pos	Team	Outcome
**1**	**Azerbaijan**	**Retained spot in 2020 EBSL Division A**
2	Kazakhstan	Remain in Division B
3	Romania	Remain in Division B
4	Greece	Remain in Division B
5	Hungary	Remain in Division B
6	Czech Republic	Remain in Division B
7	Estonia	Remain in Division B
8	Georgia	Remain in Division B

== Superfinal (Figueira da Foz, 5–8 September) ==
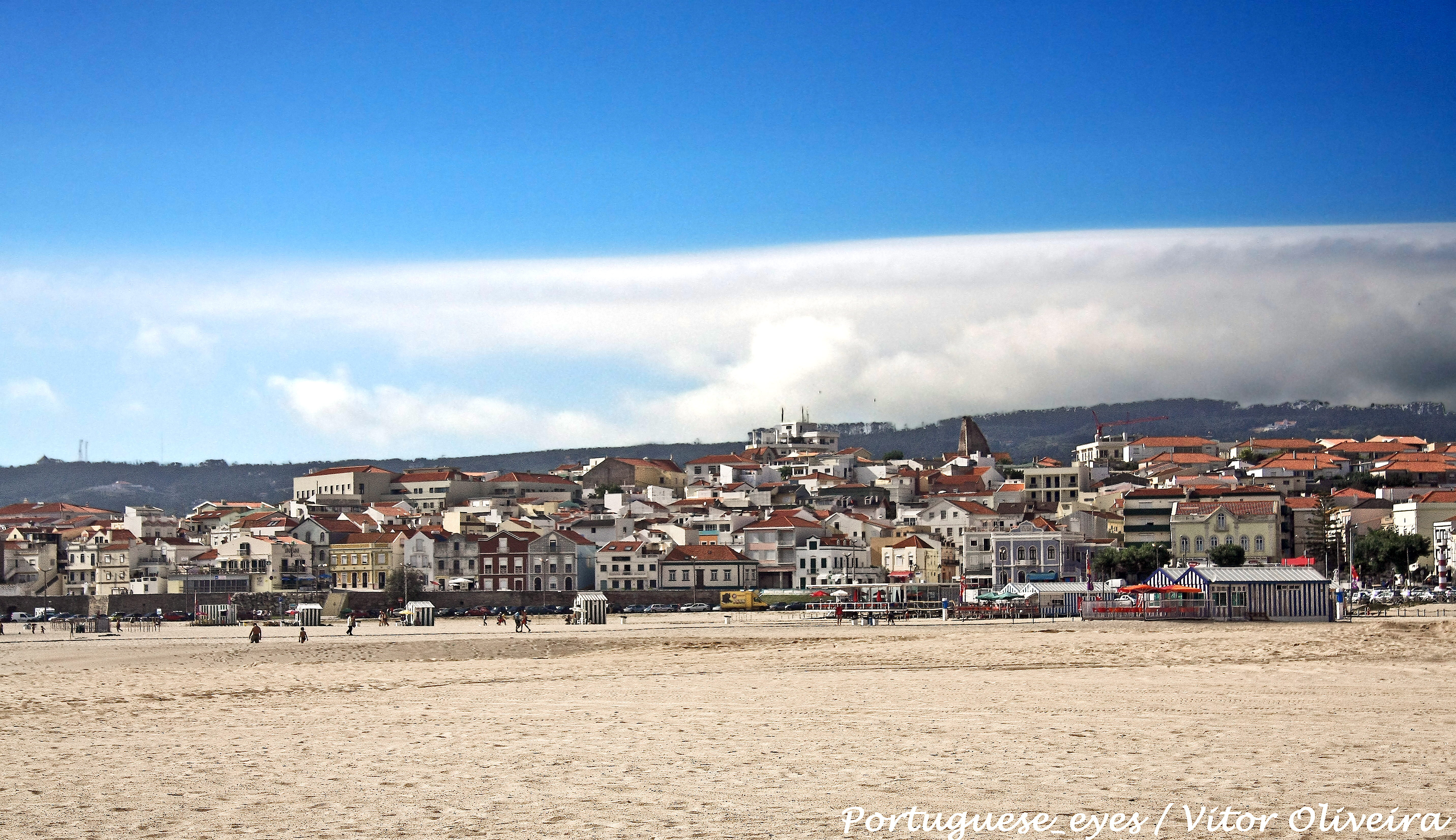
Praia de Buarcos

Matches are listed as local time in Figueira da Foz, WEST (UTC+1).

All matches took place at a purpose-built stadium constructed between 12 August and 3 September at the Beach Sports Complex on Praia de Buarcos (Buarcos Beach), with a capacity of 2,500.

The winners of the Superfinal are crowned 2019 EBSL champions. No teams made their debut in the Superfinal, however Turkey made their first appearance in 17 years.

=== Qualified teams ===
The top eight teams from Division A, as per the end of regular season league table, qualified for the Superfinal.

- Spain
- Portugal (hosts)
- Italy
- Belarus
- Ukraine
- Russia
- Turkey
- Switzerland

=== Group stage ===
Key: Advance to –	Final /	3rd place match /	5th place match /	7th place match /	(H) Hosts

==== Group 1 ====
Pos	Team	Pld	W	W+	WP	L	GF	GA	GD	Pts
1	Russia	3	2	0	0	1	16	11	+5	6
2	Spain	3	2	0	0	1	18	17	+1	6
3	Belarus	3	1	0	1	1	12	12	0	4
4	Switzerland	3	0	0	0	3	14	20	–6	0

5 September 2019	Belarus	4–4 (a.e.t.) (2–1 p)	Russia
14:15	Makarevich 1'; Piatrouski 5'; Samsonov 15'; Savich 33'	Report(ru)	4', 26' (pen.) Makarov; 24' Paporotnyi; 27' Zemskov	Referee: Sergio Gomes Soares (Portugal)
	Penalties
	Savich (penalty scored); Samsonov (penalty missed); Chaikouski (penalty scored)		(penalty scored) Shishin; (penalty missed) Paporotnyi; (penalty missed) Krasheninnikov

5 September 2019	Switzerland	8–9	Spain
17:00	Jaeggy 6' (pen.); Woodtli 7'; Hodel 9' (pen.); Ott 10', 33'; Mounoud 17', 20'; Spaccarotella 27'	Report(ru)	5', 23', 31' Chiki; 26', 32', 35' Antonio Mayor; 27' Eduard; 28' Llorenç; 33' Dona	Referee: Lukasz Ostrowski (Poland)

6 September 2019	Belarus	6–5	Switzerland
14:15	Ott 5' (o.g.); Makarevich 9'; Samsonov 15', 34'; Bryshtel 32', 33'	Report(ru)	2', 27' Steinemann; 19' (o.g.) Savich; 28' Jaeggy; 34' Schirinzi	Referee: Sofien Benchabane (France)

6 September 2019	Spain	6–7	Russia
16:55	Eduard 3'; Chiki 7', 14', 20' (pen.); Llorenç 11'; Adrian 17'	Report(ru)	4', 32' Paporotnyi; 10' Shishin; 21' Fedorov; 25', 27', 31' Zemskov	Referee: Eduards Borisevics (Latvia)

7 September 2019	Russia	5–1	Switzerland
14:15	Fedorov 3', 35'; Nikonorov 17', 22', 27'	Report(ru)	5' Schirinzi	Referee: Sergio Gomes Soares (Portugal)

7 September 2019	Spain	3–2	Belarus
17:00	Javi Torres 20'; Antonio 24', 28'	Report(ru)	5' Chaikouski; 33' Bryshtsel	Referee: Gionni Matticoli (Italy)

==== Group 2 ====
Pos	Team	Pld	W	W+	WP	L	GF	GA	GD	Pts
1	Portugal (H)	3	3	0	0	0	20	12	+8	9
2	Italy	3	2	0	0	1	18	14	+4	6
3	Turkey	3	0	0	1	2	13	22	–9	1
4	Ukraine	3	0	0	0	3	11	14	–3	0

5 September 2019	Italy	5–4	Ukraine
15:45	Zurlo 6', 13', 14'; Corosiniti 32'; Palmacci 36'	Report(ru)	1' Makeiev; 15' Shcherytsia; 22' Voitenko; 35' (o.g.) Ramacciotti	Referee: Francisco de Oses Bumedien (Spain)

5 September 2019	Turkey	5–9	Portugal
18:00	Yesilirmak 7'; Terzioglu 12'; Keskin 13', 19'; Türkmen 15' (pen.)	Report(ru)	4', 21', 31' Gonçalves; 5' (pen.), 17' Leo Martins; 6' Bê Martins; 10' Santos; 20', 21' Belchior

6 September 2019	Italy	7–2	Turkey
15:30	Zurlo 6', 12', 16', 35'; Ramacciotti 13'; Marinai 15'; Gentilin 25'	Report(ru)	12', 25' Keskin	Referee: Vladimir Tashkov (Bulgaria)

6 September 2019	Portugal	3–1	Ukraine
18:15	Madjer 8'; Bê Martins 17'; Jordan 35'	Report(ru)	8' Shcherytsia

7 September 2019	Ukraine	6–6 (a.e.t.) (1–3 p)	Turkey
15:30	Voitenko 9', 21'; Pachev 16'; Shcherytsia 23' (pen.); Zborovskiy 36'; Nerush 39'	Report(ru)	2', 13' Türkmen; 5', 5', 27' Terzioglu; 38' (pen.) Keskin	Referee: Eduards Borisevics (Latvia)
	Penalties
	Glutskyi (penalty scored); Voitenko (penalty missed)		(penalty scored) Keskin; (penalty scored) Türkmen; (penalty scored) Anzafioglu

7 September 2019	Portugal	8–6	Italy
18:15	Bê Martins 5'; Leo Martins 12'; Gonçalves 13', 27' (pen.); Rui Coimbra 23', 36'; Jordan 28', 30'	Report(ru)	4' Sciacca; 21' (pen.) Zurlo; 22', 23', 35' Ramacciotti; 34' Palmacci

=== Play-off stage ===
==== Seventh place play-off ====
8 September 2019
12:55

Switzerland	7–9	Ukraine
Hodel 13', 35' (pen.); Ott 17', 23'; Steinemann 18', 32' (pen.); Mounoud 22'	Report(ru)	7' Pachev; 8', 33', 35' Zborovskyi; 10' Voitok; 15' Makeiev; 18', 28' Voitenko; 35' Medvid

==== Fifth place play-off ====
8 September 2019
14:20

Belarus	5–4	Turkey
Ryabko 2'; Hapon 5', 7'; Bokach 22'; Savich 36'	Report(ru)	7', 9', 35' Keskin; 31' Bağcı

Referee: Francisco Henriques Costa (Portugal)

==== Third place play-off ====
8 September 2019
16:50

Spain	4–1	Italy
Adrian 8'; Antonio 23', 34'; Chiky 36'	Report(ru)	19' (o.g.) Ardil

Referee: Antonio Pereyra Almeida (Portugal)

==== Superfinal match ====
8 September 2019
18:00

Russia	2–4	Portugal
Zemskov 7'; Makarov 11'	Report(ru)	24' Leo Martins; 30' Rui Coimbra; 32' Belchior; 35' Bê Martins

Referee: Gionni Matticoli (Italy)

=== Awards ===
==== Winners trophy ====
2019 Euro Beach Soccer League
champions

Portugal
Sixth title

==== Individual awards ====
Awarded for feats achieved in the Superfinal only

Top scorer(s)
(Italy) Emmanuele Zurlo
(Turkey) Cem Keskin
8 goals
Best player
(Portugal) Jordan Santos
Best goalkeeper
(Russia) Maxim Chuzhkov

=== Final standings ===
Finalists Russia and Portugal faced each other for a record fourth time in an EBSL title-decider (no fixture has been played more in the Sueprfinal match), with Russia having won all three previous meetings (2009, 2013, 2017); both teams were aiming to win a record sixth EBSL title, surpassing the current five title record shared with Spain who first reached the milestone in 2006.

Pos	Team	Result
1	Portugal	EBSL Champions (6th title)
2	Russia	Runners-up
3	Spain	Third place
4	Italy	
5	Belarus	
6	Turkey	
7	Ukraine	
8	Switzerland	

== Season statistics (Division A) ==
=== Top scorers ===
The following tables list the top 12 scorers in Division A, including goals scored in both the regular and post season events.

Rank	Player	Pld	Goals
1	(Turkey) Cem Keskin	7	13
2	(Portugal) Jordan Santos	7	10
2	(Spain) Antonio Mayor	7	10
2	(Spain) Salavador "Chiky" Ardil	7	10
5	(Italy) Emmanuele Zurlo	6	9
6	(Switzerland) Dejan Stankovic	4	8
6	(Switzerland) Glenn Hodel	6	8
8	(Russia) Boris Nikonorov	6	7
8	(Turkey) Baris Terzioglu	7	7
8	(Italy) Paolo Palmacci	7	7
8	(Portugal) João Gonçalves	7	7
12	(Germany) Sven Körner	3	6
12	(Spain) Eduard Suarez	7	6
12	(Ukraine) Yurii Shcherytsia	7	6

=== Most assists ===
The following tables list the top 10 assistants in Division A including assists provided in both the regular and post season events.

Rank	Player	Pld	Assists
1	(Switzerland) Noël Ott	7	7
1	(Portugal) Bê Martins	7	7
1	(Switzerland) Valentin Jäggy	7	7
4	(Portugal) Belchior	7	6
4	(Spain) Jose Cintas	7	6
4	(Italy) Paolo Palmacci	7	6
7	(Switzerland) Tobias Steinemann	6	5
7	(Ukraine) Dmytro Medved	7	5
7	(Turkey) Recep Demir	7	5
7	(Portugal) Leo Martins	7	5
7	(Italy) Andrea Carpita	7	5
7	(Italy) Simone Del Mestre	7	5

Notes:
1.	There are no awards presented for these season-encompassing scoring feats, the tables are for statistical purposes only. Scoring awards were bestowed per stage, with the primary award that which was presented in the Superfinal.
2.	Regarding the recording of assists: The source of these assists stats does not explain what system was used to determine the awarding of an assist. The total no. of assists recorded is 233 but 298 goals were scored. The discrepancy of the source not recording an assist for every goal scored may be due to a system in use such as FIFAs assists system – (regardless of who made the final pass to the scorer, no assist is awarded when the scorer ultimately lays the goal on for him/herself via a dribble, solo run etc., scores after intercepting an opponent's pass etc.). However, since the system in use is not explained, note that assists may simply of gone undocumented.

=== Discipline ===
The following table lists the players and teams who received the most penalties for disciplinary infringements in both the regular and post season events.

Category	Player(s)	#	Team(s)	#
Most yellow cards (yellow card)	(Turkey) Yasin Bagci	4	Turkey	14
Second yellow cards (yellow card) (yellow-red card)	(Belarus) Ivan Kanstantsinau (Poland) Jakub Jesionowski (Italy) Pietro Palazzolo (Belarus) Aleh Hapon	1	Belarus	2
Straight red cards (red card)	(Ukraine) Roman Pachev (Turkey) Mehmet Aslamaci (France) Anthony Fayos (Switzerland) Sandro Spaccarotella (Ukraine) Vitalii Sydorenko (Turkey) Volkan Yesilirmak (Switzerland) Noël Ott	1	Ukraine; Switzerland; Turkey	2
