= Finland national beach soccer team =

National sports team

Finland
- Association: Suomen Palloliitto
- Confederation: UEFA (Europe)
- Head coach: Perttu Nisula
- FIFA code: FIN
First colours
Second colours

First international
- Estonia 4 – 1 Finland (Pärnu, Estonia; 27 June 2009)

Biggest win
- Finland 7 – 3 Norway (Copenhagen, Denmark; 10 September 2017)

Biggest defeat
- Estonia 4 – 1 Finland (Pärnu, Estonia; 27 June 2009)

The Finnish national beach soccer team represents Finland in international beach soccer competitions and is controlled by the SPL, the governing body for football in Finland. The team was formed in 2009.

== Current squad ==
Correct as of 27 June 2009

Note: Flags indicate national team as defined under FIFA eligibility rules; some limited exceptions apply. Players may hold more than one non-FIFA nationality.

No.	Pos.	Nation	Player
—	GK		Matias Sarelius
—	DF		Teemu Jaakkola
—	DF		Pauli Ojalehto
—	DF		Mikko Rauhanen

No.	Pos.	Nation	Player
—	DF		Teemu Terho
—	FW		Matias Juvonen
—	FW		Henrik Henriksson
—	FW		Lasse Lind

== Match history ==
Date	Comp.	Venue	Home team	Result	Away team	Scorers
27 June 2009	Friendly	Pärnu, Estonia	Estonia	4 – 1	Finland	Lasse Lind
7 July 2011	Friendly	Pori, Finland	Finland	1 – 1 Estonia win on pens.	Estonia	Goal
28 May 2017	Friendly	Tallinn, Estonia	Estonia	4 – 3	Finland	Goal
10 September 2017	Scandinavian Cup 2017	Copenhagen, Denmark	Finland	7 – 3	Norway	Goal
27 May 2018	Friendly	Tallinn, Estonia	Estonia	7 – 4	Finland	Goal
