= Buarcos =

- Civil parish
- Location in Portugal
- Coordinates: 40.166°N 8.877°W
- Country: Portugal
- Region: Centro
- Intermunic. comm.: Região de Coimbra
- District: Coimbra
- Municipality: Figueira da Foz

Area
  - Total: 15.53 km^{2} (6.00 sq mi)

Population (2011)
  - Total: 18,454
  - Density: 1,188/km^{2} (3,078/sq mi)
- Time zone: UTC+00:00 (WET)
  - Summer (DST): UTC+01:00 (WEST)

Buarcos is a freguesia (civil parish) in Figueira da Foz Municipality, Portugal. The population in 2011 was 18,454, in an area of 15.53 km^{2} (6.00 sq mi).

During the 1600s, the people of Buarcos were harassed by pirates and built the long fortification that stands to this day. It is a traditional fishing town that has grown also as a noted beach resort due to its natural landscape namely the beach which is sheltered from the strong northern winds by the Boa Viagem small mountain range (Serra da Boa Viagem). Many of its inhabitants still work in the fishing industry but tourism is also an important activity. It has hotels, seafood restaurants and bars with view over the bay and the extensive beach.

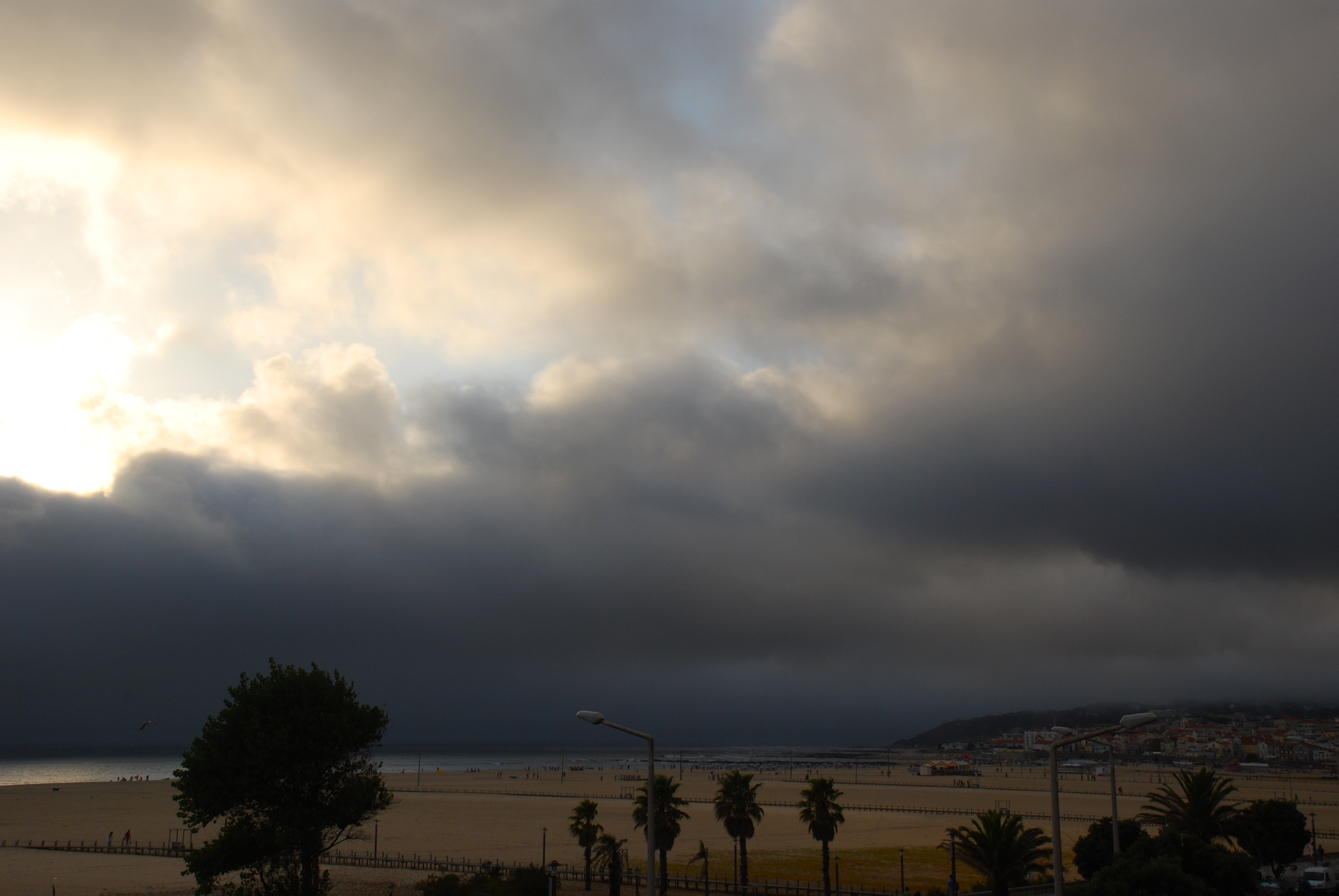
Buarcos Beach before a storm

In the 20th century Buarcos was a popular beach for Portuguese people from the entire Centro Region from Coimbra and beyond. In the 21st century Buarcos, like the entire region's coastal beach locations, became a popular destination for a larger number of European travellers as well.
