= Lasse Lind =

Finnish footballer (born 1981)

Personal information
- Date of birth: 1 March 1981 (age 45)
- Place of birth: Helsinki, Finland
- Height: 1.75 m (5 ft 9 in)
- Position: Midfielder

Team information
- Current team: FC Viikingit

Senior career*
Years	Team	Apps	(Gls)
–2003	FC Honka	51	(8)
2004–2005	Bonner SC	1	(0)
2005–2006	FC Honka	3	(0)
2007–2008	Atlantis FC	21	(1)
2009–present	FC Viikingit	5	(0)
- * Club domestic league appearances and goals

Lasse Lind (born 1 March 1981) is a Finnish football midfielder who currently plays for FC Viikingit.
