= Datinha =

Brazilian beach soccer player

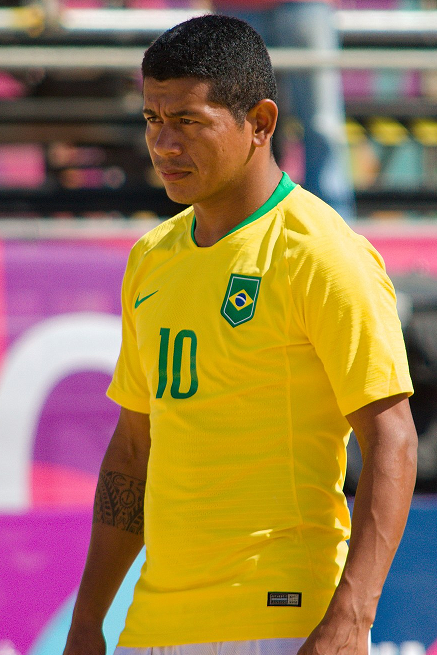
- Datinha at the 2019 South American Beach Games.

Personal information
- Full name: Luiz Alberto do Nascimento Braga
- Date of birth: 12 April 1988 (age 38)
- Place of birth: Tutóia, Maranhão, Brazil
- Height: 1.67 m (5 ft 6 in)
- Position: Defender

Senior career*
Years	Team	Apps	(Gls)
2010–	Sampaio Corrêa		
2012	Al-Ahli		
2012–	Kristall		
2013	Flamengo		
2015	Barcelona		
2014–2018	Alanyaspor		
2016–2018	Sporting CP		
2021	Pisa		
2021	Tokyo Verdy		
2022	Braga		
2024–	Pisa		

International career^{‡}
2012–	Brazil	145	(110)
- * Club domestic league appearances and goals ‡ National team caps and goals as of 12 November 2022

Luiz Alberto do Nascimento Braga (born 12 April 1988), known better as Datinha, is a Brazilian beach soccer player who currently plays as a defender. A versatile player, he has previously been designated as a forward and a midfielder during his career.

== Career ==
Previously a fisherman, Datinha, described as "shy", began pursuing beach soccer seriously in 2010, playing in his local State Championship in Maranhão, and subsequently the Brazilian National Championship. He was first called up to the Brazil national team in 2012.

He went on to win the 2017 FIFA Beach Soccer World Cup representing Brazil and claimed the Bronze Ball (third best player) award at the competition; he has also appeared at five other World Cups, in 2013, 2015, 2019, 2021, and 2024, captaining his side to a second win in 2024. In addition, he was named as one of the world's best three players at the 2018 Beach Soccer Stars awards.

In the Mundialito de Clubes, he has represented Al-Ahli in 2012, Flamengo in 2013, and Barcelona in 2015, winning the latter. After an absence, he returned to the Mundialito in 2021 with Tokyo Verdy.

Datinha is also a longtime member of Russian club Kristall, having scored over 200 goals and played in nearly 300 games for the team across all competitions between 2012 and 2021, during which time he became European champion four times and Russian league champion on six occasions; he continues to play for Kristall in Russian competitions, but at European level has since played for Braga in 2022 and Pisa in 2024 and 2025. He was persuaded by fellow Brazilian internationals Bruno Xavier and Jorginho to pursue beach soccer in Russia. Fellow Brazilian association footballer Hulk has been an inspiration to Datinha during his career. He also continues to play for Sampaio Corrêa in Brazil, including their run to fifth place in the 2017 Copa Libertadores. Additionally, in domestic competitions, he has played for Sporting CP in Portugal, Alanyaspor in Turkey, and most recently Pisa in Italy.

== Statistics ==
Country

Competition	Year	Apps	Goals	Ref.
FIFA Beach Soccer World Cup	(French Polynesia) 2013	6	1	
FIFA Beach Soccer World Cup	(Portugal) 2015	4	1	
FIFA Beach Soccer World Cup	(The Bahamas) 2017	6	3	
FIFA Beach Soccer World Cup	(Paraguay) 2019	4	1	
FIFA Beach Soccer World Cup	(Russia) 2021	4	0	
FIFA Beach Soccer World Cup	(United Arab Emirates) 2024	6	0	
Total		30	6	—

Club

Tournament	Year	Club	Apps	Goals	Ref.
Euro Winners Cup
Euro Winners Cup	(Italy) 2014	(Russia) Kristall	6	13	
Euro Winners Cup	(Italy) 2015	(Russia) Kristall	7	10	
Euro Winners Cup	(Italy) 2016	(Russia) Kristall	4	5	
Euro Winners Cup	(Portugal) 2017	(Russia) Kristall	7	2	
Euro Winners Cup	(Portugal) 2018	(Russia) Kristall	10	5	
Euro Winners Cup	(Portugal) 2019	(Russia) Kristall	8	6	
Euro Winners Cup	(Portugal) 2020	(Russia) Kristall	5	3	
Euro Winners Cup	(Portugal) 2021	(Russia) Kristall	8	3	
Euro Winners Cup	(Portugal) 2022	(Portugal) Braga	6	3	
Euro Winners Cup	(Portugal) 2024	(Italy) Pisa	7	2	
Euro Winners Cup	(Portugal) 2025	(Italy) Pisa	7	4	
Euro Winners Cup	Total		75	56	—
Mundialito de Clubes
Mundialito de Clubes	(Brazil) 2012	(United Arab Emirates) Al-Ahli	3	3	
Mundialito de Clubes	(Brazil) 2013	(Brazil) Flamengo	5	4	
Mundialito de Clubes	(Brazil) 2015	(Spain) Barcelona	5	7	
Mundialito de Clubes	(Russia) 2021	(Japan) Tokyo Verdy	3	2	
Mundialito de Clubes	Total		16	16	—

== Achievements ==
The following is a selection, not an exhaustive list, of the major international honours Datinha has achieved:

=== Country ===
- FIFA Beach Soccer World Cup
  - Winner (2): 2017, 2024
- World Beach Games
  - Winner (1): 2019
- Intercontinental Cup
  - Winner (3): 2014, 2016, 2017
- CONMEBOL qualifiers for the FIFA Beach Soccer World Cup
  - Winner (2): 2017, 2019
- Copa América
  - Winner (2): 2016, 2018
- Mundialito
  - Winner (2): 2016, 2017
- South American Beach Games
  - Winner (1): 2019
- South American Beach Soccer League
  - Winner (2): 2017, 2018

=== Club ===
- Euro Winners Cup
  - Winner (4): 2014, 2015, 2020, 2021
  - Runner-up (3): 2018, 2022, 2024
- Euro Winners Challenge
  - Winner (1): 2018
- Mundialito de Clubes
  - Winner (1): 2015
  - Runner-up (1): 2013

=== Individual ===
- FIFA Beach Soccer World Cup (1):
  - Bronze Ball: 2017
- Beach Soccer Stars (2):
  - World's top 3 best players: 2018
  - World dream team: 2018
- Euro Winners Cup (1):
  - Best player: 2015
- Mundialito de Clubes (1):
  - Top scorer: 2015
- CONMEBOL qualifiers for the FIFA Beach Soccer World Cup (1):
  - Top scorer: 2015
