= Bê Martins =

Portuguese beach soccer player

Bê Martins OIH ComM
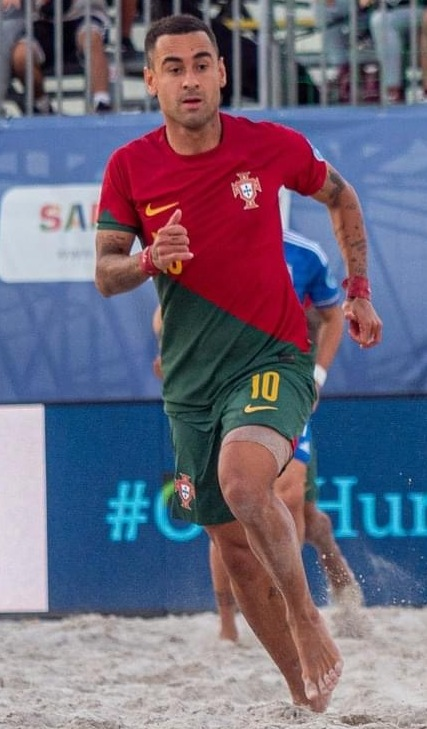
- Bê Martins during the 2023 EBSL.

Personal information
- Full name: Bernardo Barral Martins Santos
- Date of birth: 29 December 1989 (age 36)
- Place of birth: Rio de Janeiro, Brazil
- Height: 1.72 m (5 ft 8 in)
- Position: Midfielder

International career^{‡}
Years	Team	Apps	(Gls)
2014–	Portugal	176	(148)
- ‡ National team caps and goals as of 24 September 2023

Bernardo Barral Martins Santos OIH ComM (born 29 December 1989), better known simply as Bê Martins, is a Brazilian-born, Portuguese beach soccer player who plays as a midfielder. He is a two-time winner of the FIFA Beach Soccer World Cup (2015 and 2019); he claimed the Bronze Ball (third best player) award at the latter, and in 2022 and 2024, was named the world's best player at the Beach Soccer Stars awards ceremony.

Martins has an identical twin brother, Léo, who is also a high-profile beach soccer player.

== Biography ==
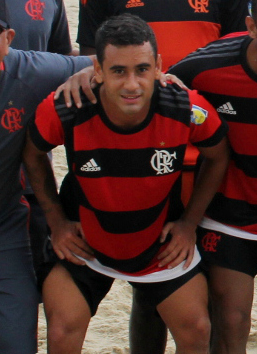
Be Martins playing for Flamengo in 2016.

Martins and his twin brother, Léo, were born in Brazil. Bê was born two minutes before his younger sibling. Aged 18, they went to play association football in Spain on the promise of a contract. However, when they arrived, an issue with their agent meant there was no club to sign for. The move was funded by their parents, but without an income the money soon ran out and the brothers found themselves broke and starving. Despite this, they stayed in Spain to attempt to recuperate the money for their parents. Eventually, they landed a contract with CD Canillas. During this time, they began the application process for Portuguese citizenship. This was possible since their paternal great-grandfather was from the country. In 2009, citizenship was achieved. Aged 21, in 2011, their contracts ended and their mother developed a health issue, and so they returned to Brazil. To maintain their fitness, they began training on the beach. Struggling to find a new football club, they started to pursue beach soccer instead, joining Vasco da Gama and soon after, Flamengo. Bê progressed somewhat quicker than his brother; after impressing for Flamengo at the 2012 Mundialito de Clubes, he was offered a role at a Russian club to which he moved. He was later followed by his twin.

Bê was called up to the Brazil national team in 2012 for an exhibition tournament in Paraguay. However, soon after, Júnior Negão became the new head coach of Brazil, and Bê found himself out of favour.

The twins received an offer to join the Portugal squad at the end of 2014 after playing for clubs in Italy. Despite renewed offers from the Brazil national team for Bê, the brothers decided they wanted to represent Portugal instead, citing their belief that there would be less chance of a "follow-up" if they were to join Brazil, their admiration for the country, and for Portuguese legends Madjer and Alan who supported their integration into the Portuguese squad when they learnt of their citizenship. Bê debuted for Portugal at the 2014 Beach Soccer Intercontinental Cup, six months before his brother, earning 15 caps during that time.

The following year, aged 24, Bê was awarded with the "Rising Star" commendation at the 2015 Beach Soccer Stars awards ceremony, as chosen by the Beach Soccer Worldwide expert committee. This followed his role in Portugal's 2015 World Cup win, which, in response to, Bê, along with the rest of the squad, were appointed as Officers of the Order of Prince Henry in December 2015. That year, both brothers also moved to Braga with whom they would go on to win multiple domestic and European club titles.

Bê's stock value particularly began to rise following his influential performances during Portugal's 2019 World Cup win, when he was honoured as the third best player of the competition, winning the Bronze Ball award. Following the World Cup victory, along with the rest of the squad, Bê was made a Commander of the Order of Merit. In 2021, he was named as part of the year's world dream team. In 2022, he won the world's best player award at the Beach Soccer Stars ceremony, the latter of which he described as "exceptionally rewarding" and a "recognition of all my hard work". He was honoured as beach soccer player of the year at the Portuguese Football Federation (FPF)'s annual year-ending Quinas de Ouro (Golden Shields) awards in 2023.

== Statistics ==
Note: Some of the sources of these statistics may have counted an appearance when the player was actually an unused substitute.

County

Competition	Year	Apps	Goals	Ref.
FIFA Beach Soccer World Cup	(Portugal) 2015	5	3	
FIFA Beach Soccer World Cup	(The Bahamas) 2017	4	0	
FIFA Beach Soccer World Cup	(Paraguay) 2019	6	4	
FIFA Beach Soccer World Cup	(Russia) 2021	3	0	
Total		18	7	—

Competition	Season	Apps	Goals	Ref.
Euro Beach Soccer League	2015	7	3	
Euro Beach Soccer League	2016	9	5	
Euro Beach Soccer League	2017	7	8	
Euro Beach Soccer League	2018	9	6	
Euro Beach Soccer League	2019	7	5	
Euro Beach Soccer League	2020	4	2	
Euro Beach Soccer League	2021	7	4	
Euro Beach Soccer League	2022	6	11	
Euro Beach Soccer League	2023	6	7	
Total		62	51	—

Club

Tournament	Year	Club	Apps	Goals	Ref.
Euro Winners Cup
Euro Winners Cup	(Italy) 2014	(Italy) Catania	6	2	
Euro Winners Cup	(Italy) 2015	(Italy) Catania	7	6	
Euro Winners Cup	(Portugal) 2016	(Portugal) Braga	7	14	
Euro Winners Cup	(Portugal) 2017	(Portugal) Braga	7	5	
Euro Winners Cup	(Portugal) 2018	(Portugal) Braga	7	6	
Euro Winners Cup	(Portugal) 2019	(Portugal) Braga	8	7	
Euro Winners Cup	(Portugal) 2020	(Portugal) Braga	7	5	
Euro Winners Cup	(Portugal) 2021	(Portugal) Braga	7	8	
Euro Winners Cup	(Portugal) 2022	(Portugal) Braga	7	4	
Euro Winners Cup	(Portugal) 2023	(Portugal) Braga	9	5	
Total			72	62	—

== Honours ==
The following is a selection, not an exhaustive list, of the major international honours that Bê has achieved:

=== Country ===
- FIFA Beach Soccer World Cup
  - Winner (2): 2015, 2019
- Euro Beach Soccer League
  - Winner (4): 2015, 2019, 2020, 2021
- European Games
  - Gold medal (1): 2019
  - Bronze medal (1): 2015
- Euro Beach Soccer Cup
  - Winner (1): 2016
- Mundialito
  - Winner (4): 2016, 2017, 2018, 2019
- Mediterranean Beach Games
  - Silver medal (1): 2023

=== Club ===
- Euro Winners Cup
  - Winner (3): 2017, 2018, 2019
  - Runner-up (4): 2015, 2020, 2021, 2022
- Mundialito de Clubes
  - Winner (3): 2017, 2019, 2020
  - Runner-up (2): 2012, 2021

=== Individual ===
- FIFA Beach Soccer World Cup (1):
  - Bronze Ball: 2019, 2025
- Beach Soccer Stars (4):
  - World's best player: 2022, 2024
  - World dream team: 2021, 2022, 2023, 2024
  - Rising star: 2015
- Euro Beach Soccer League (2):
  - Superfinal:
    - Best player: 2016
  - Regular season stages:
    - Best player: 2018 (x1)
- Mundialito de Clubes (1):
  - Best player: 2019
- FPF Quinas de Ouro (1):
  - Beach soccer player of the year: 2023

=== Orders ===
- Officer (OIH) of the Order of Prince Henry (since 2015)
- Commander (ComM) of the Order of Merit (since 2019)
