= 2017 Mundialito de Clubes =

V Mundialito de Clubes

Tournament details
- Host country: Brazil
- Dates: 14–17 December 2017
- Teams: 8 (from 3 confederations)
- Venue: 1 (in 1 host city)

Final positions
- Champions: (Russia) Lokomotiv Moscow (2nd title)
- Runners-up: (Iran) Pars Jonoubi
- Third place: (Brazil) Corinthians
- Fourth place: (Brazil) Flamengo

Tournament statistics
- Matches played: 16
- Goals scored: 132 (8.25 per match)
- Top scorer(s): (Brazil) Igor Rangel (7 goals)
- Best player: (Brazil) Nelito
- Best goalkeeper: (Russia) Maxim Chuzhkov

The 2017 Mundialito de Clubes was the fifth edition of the Mundialito de Clubes (Club World Cup in English), a biennial international club beach soccer competition contested between top men's clubs from across the world (existing clubs and teams specially assembled for the event). The tournament is loosely similar to the FIFA Club World Cup in association football. However, participating teams are not regional champions, entering via invitation.

Organised by Beach Soccer Worldwide (BSWW) and other local entities in Brazil, the competition took place in Vargem Grande Paulista, São Paulo State, Brazil between December 14 and 17, featuring eight clubs.

Barcelona were the incumbent champions but did not enter a team this year. The tournament was won by Lokomotiv Moscow who became the first team to win two Mundialito de Clubes titles, beating Iranian club Pars Jonoubi 5–4 in the final.

== Teams ==
Eight invited clubs entered the competition, representing six different nations and three continents. Africa, North America and Oceania are unrepresented.

Confederation	Team(s)
AFC (Asia)	(Iran) Pars Jonoubi
CONMEBOL (South America)	(Argentina) Rosario Central (Brazil) Botafogo (Brazil) Corinthians (Brazil) Flamengo
UEFA (Europe)	(Portugal) Sporting CP (Russia) Lokomotiv Moscow (Spain) Levante

== Squads ==
2017 Mundialito de Clubes squads

(Brazil) Botafogo

- (Brazil) Paulinho
- (Brazil) Anailton Alcántara (GK)
- (Portugal) Elinton Andrade (GK)
- (Brazil) Balinha
- (Brazil) Bernardo Botelho
- (Brazil) Dani
- (Brazil) Lucas Calmon
- (Brazil) Igor Rangel
- (Brazil) Vinicius Guedes
- (Brazil) Gabriel Novaes
- (Brazil) Junior Paulo Gil
- (Brazil) Jefferson Sobreira

(Brazil) Corinthians

- (Brazil) Andrezinho
- (Brazil) Leandro Brito (GK)
- (Brazil) José Wesley Da Silva (GK)
- (Brazil) Anderson Dias Lima
- (Brazil) Fred
- (Russia) Artur Paporotnyi
- (Brazil) Daniel Nogueira Lima
- (Portugal) Leo Martins
- (Paraguay) Pedro Moran
- (Brazil) Everaldo Santos Souza
- (Russia) Dmitry Shishin
- (Brazil) Joao Carlos Silva de Santana

(Brazil) Flamengo

- (Brazil) Willian F. de Oliveira (GK)
- (Colombia) Jeison Levid Sánchez Escobar (GK)
- (Brazil) Marcelo Bueno
- (Brazil) Antonio Damasio
- (Japan) Takasuke Goto
- (Brazil) Andre Portela da Silva
- (Brazil) Deiwerson Pureza Oureza
- (Brazil) Anderson Wesley
- (Brazil) Benjamin Jr.
- (Brazil) Michel Nascimento
- (Brazil) Thanger Nascimento
- (Brazil) Augusto Matheus

(Spain) Levante

- (Germany) Christian Biermann
- (Spain) Víctor Viala (GK)
- (Spain) Adrian Frutos Garcia
- (Spain) Pablo Perez
- (Spain) Antonio Aceiton del Haro
- (Spain) Iván Latorre Pitarch
- (Spain) Antonio Mayor
- (Spain) José Miralles Martínez
- (Switzerland) Elliot Mounoud (GK)
- (Spain) Enrique Moratal
- (Spain) Christian Torres
- (Spain) Javi Torres

(Russia) Lokomotiv Moscow

- (Russia) Aleksey Makarov
- (Russia) Anton Shkarin
- (Russia) Ilya Leonov
- (Russia) Maxim Chuzhkov (GK)
- (Russia) Maksim Rogovskii (GK)
- (Spain) Llorenç Gomez
- (Russia) Boris Nikonorov
- (Brazil) Nelito
- (Switzerland) Dejan Stankovic
- (Japan) Ozu Moreira
- (Portugal) Be Martins

(Iran) Pars Jonoubi

- (Iran) Hamid Behzadpour (GK)
- (Iran) Mostafa Kiani
- (Iran) Amir Akbari
- (Iran) Arash Karami
- (Iran) Farid Boulokbashi
- (Iran) Hamidreza Mihandoust
- (Iran) Moslem Mesigar
- (Iran) Mohammadjavad Khosravi (GK)
- (Brazil) Thyago Pimenta
- (Brazil) Pedro Gomides
- (Iran) Ali Mirshekari
- (Iran) Mohammad Masoumizadeh

(Argentina) Rosario Central

- (Argentina) Angelo Agustini
- (Argentina) Sebastian Azimonti (GK)
- (Uruguay) Pampero
- (Argentina) Luciano Donato
- (Argentina) Leandro Camilatti
- (Uruguay) Luis Alberto Quinta Acuña
- (Argentina) Cristian Cuevas
- (Argentina) Hugo Luis Longo
- (Argentina) Milton Jaimes
- (Argentina) Sebastian Navarro (GK)
- (Argentina) Maximiliano Ponzetti
- (Argentina) Nahuel Gigena

(Portugal) Sporting CP

- (Portugal) Madjer
- (Portugal) Tiago Petrony (GK)
- (Portugal) Ricardo Baptista
- (Portugal) Duarte Vivo
- (Canada) Mathew Santos
- (Portugal) Tiago Batalha
- (Portugal) Jordan Santos
- (Portugal) Zé Maria
- (Brazil) Paulinho
- (Brazil) Wanderson Antonio (GK)
- (Brazil) Alan Santos
- (Brazil) Eudin

== Venue ==
Location of Vargem Grande Paulista in Brazil

One venue was used in the city of Vargem Grande Paulista, São Paulo.

- An arena with a capacity of 2,000 at Rua Serra da Mantiqueira (Rua da Feira) hosted the matches.

== Draw ==
The draw to split the eight teams into two groups of four was conducted by BSWW and took place in the afternoon of November 30.

Initially, two teams were automatically assigned to the groups:

- to Group A: as the São Paulo based host club, (Brazil) Corinthians
- to Group B: the other seeded club, (Brazil) Flamengo

The remaining six teams were split into three pots of two, shown in the below table.

The clubs were paired into pots based on similar geographical proximity. From each pot, one team was drawn into Group A and the other team was drawn into Group B.

Pot 1 (Seeds)	Pot 2	Pot 3	Pot 4
(Brazil) Corinthians (hosts); (Brazil) Flamengo	(Argentina) Rosario Central; (Brazil) Botafogo	(Portugal) Sporting CP; (Spain) Levante	(Russia) Lokomotiv Moscow; (Iran) Pars Jonoubi

== Group stage ==
All times are local, BRST (UTC−2).

=== Group A ===
Pos	Team	Pld	W	W+	WP	L	GF	GA	GD	Pts	Qualification
1	(Russia) Lokomotiv Moscow	3	3	0	0	0	20	6	+14	9	Advance to the Final
2	(Brazil) Corinthians (H)	3	2	0	0	1	10	10	0	6	3rd place play-off
3	(Brazil) Botafogo	3	1	0	0	2	11	16	−5	3	5th place play-off
4	(Portugal) Sporting CP	3	0	0	0	3	6	15	−9	0	7th place play-off

Source: BSWW
(H) Host
14 December 2017
10:00

Lokomotiv Moscow (Russia)	6–1	(Portugal) Sporting CP
Stankovic 11'; Shkarin 12' (pen.); Nelito 14', 15'; Ozu 23'; Nikonorov 31'	Report(ru)	30' (pen.) Duarte

14 December 2017
13:00

Corinthians (Brazil)	4–3	(Brazil) Botafogo
Moran 7', 23'; Paporotnyi 19', 25'	Report(ru)	20' Botelho; 25' Igor; 34' (pen.) Balinha

15 December 2017
10:00

Botafogo (Brazil)	2–9	(Russia) Lokomotiv Moscow
Sobreira 29'; Igor 34' (pen.)	Report(ru)	8', 11', 16' (pen.) Nelito; 9', 19' Nikonorov; 17' Stankovic; 27' Makarov; 27' Be Martins; 32' (pen.) Llorenç

15 December 2017
13:00

Corinthians (Brazil)	3–2	(Portugal) Sporting CP
Paporotnyi 19'; Shishin 26'; Leo Martins 29'	Report(ru)	8' Eudin; 34' (pen.) M. Santos

16 December 2017
11:15

Corinthians (Brazil)	3–5	(Russia) Lokomotiv Moscow
Paporotnyi 19'; Daniel 21', 35'	Report(ru)	14' (pen.) Ozu; 23' Be Martins; 27' Stankovic; 30' Nikonorov; 33' Llorenç

16 December 2017
12:45

Botafogo (Brazil)	6–3	(Portugal) Sporting CP
Igor 3', 4' (pen.), 18'; Sobreira 5'; Dani 32'; Calmon 34'	Report(ru)	4' Madjer; 14' J. Santos; 24' Batalha

=== Group B ===
Pos	Team	Pld	W	W+	WP	L	GF	GA	GD	Pts	Qualification
1	(Iran) Pars Jonoubi	3	2	0	0	1	20	15	+5	6	Advance to the Final
2	(Brazil) Flamengo	3	2	0	0	1	16	9	+7	6	3rd place play-off
3	(Spain) Levante	3	2	0	0	1	13	13	0	6	5th place play-off
4	(Argentina) Rosario Central	3	0	0	0	3	5	17	−12	0	7th place play-off

Source: BSWW
14 December 2017
11:30

Flamengo (Brazil)	6–0	(Argentina) Rosario Central
Benjamin Jr. 5', 10'; Thanger 6'; Dmais 9', 9'; Maikinho 10'	Report(ru)

14 December 2017
14:30

Levante (Spain)	7–6	(Iran) Pars Jonoubi
Adrian Frutos 7' (pen.), 28'; Perez 16', 32'; Aceitón 18'; J. Torres 22'; C. Torres 33'	Report(ru)	2' Behzadpour; 14', 22' Boulokbashi; 22', 35' Kiani; 35' Mihandoust

15 December 2017
11:30

Flamengo (Brazil)	6–3	(Spain) Levante
Matheus 15'; Benjamin Jr. 16', 21', 32'; Thanger 24'; Anderson 27'	Report(ru)	10' Biermann; 22' Perez; 34' J. Torres

15 December 2017
14:30

Rosario Central (Argentina)	4–8	(Iran) Pars Jonoubi
Agustini 26'; Pampero 31', 33'; Ponzetti 36'	Report(ru)	2', 14', 23' Boulokbashi; 10' Kiani; 11' Masoumizadeh; 14', 18' Mirshekari; 28' Karami

16 December 2017
10:00

Flamengo (Brazil)	4–6	(Iran) Pars Jonoubi
Benjamin Jr. 1'; Dmais 25'; Anderson 32'; Thanger 33' (pen.)	Report(ru)	3', 17' Mesigar; 9' Pimenta; 24', 30' Masoumizadeh; 35' Behzadpour

16 December 2017
14:00

Rosario Central (Argentina)	1–3	(Spain) Levante
Agustini 22'	Report(ru)	3' Mayor; 16' Biermann; 31' Miralles

== Play-offs ==
=== Seventh place play-off ===
17 December 2017
08:30

Sporting CP (Portugal)	4–5	(Argentina) Rosario Central
Duarte 12', 24'; J. Santos 19', 22'	Report(ru)	5' (pen.) Jaimes; 14', 34' (pen.) Agustini; 18' Quinta; 29' Donato

=== Fifth place play-off ===
17 December 2017
09:45

Botafogo (Brazil)	4–4 (a.e.t.)	(Spain) Levante
Calmon 3'; Igor 22', 24' (pen.); Gil 29'	Report(ru)	3', 15' J. Torres; 26' Mayor; 31' (pen.) Perez
Penalties
Igor (penalty scored); Gil (penalty missed)	1–3	(penalty scored) Mayor; (penalty scored) Adrian Frutos; (penalty scored) Perez

=== Third place play-off ===
17 December 2017
11:15

Corinthians (Brazil)	3–2	(Brazil) Flamengo
Shishin 10'; Paporotnyi 18', 25'	Report(ru)	15' Portela; 19' Anderson

=== Final ===
17 December 2017
12:30

Lokomotiv Moscow (Russia)	5–4	(Iran) Pars Jonoubi
Makarov 1'; Shkarin 7'; Stankovic 10'; Ozu 17'; Nikonorov 19'	Report(ru)	16' Mirshekari; 17' Kiani; 18' Akbari; 28' Mesigar

== Awards ==
Top scorer
(Brazil) Igor Rangel ( (Brazil) Botafogo)
7 goals
Best player
(Brazil) Nelito ( (Russia) Lokomotiv Moscow)
Best goalkeeper
(Russia) Maxim Chuzhkov ( (Russia) Lokomotiv Moscow)

== Top goalscorers ==
Players with 3 or more goals

7 goals

- (Brazil) Igor Rangel ( (Brazil) Botafogo)

6 goals

- (Brazil) Benjamin Jr. ( (Brazil) Flamengo)
- (Russia) Artur Paporotnyi ( (Brazil) Corinthians)

5 goals

- (Iran) Farid Boulokbashi ( (Iran) Pars Jonoubi)
- (Brazil) Nelito ( (Russia) Lokomotiv Moscow)
- (Russia) Boris Nikonorov ( (Russia) Lokomotiv Moscow)

4 goals

- (Spain) Pablo Perez ( (Spain) Levante)
- (Argentina) Angelo Agustini ( (Argentina) Rosario Central)
- (Iran) Mostafa Kiani ( (Iran) Pars Jonoubi)
- (Switzerland) Dejan Stankovic ( (Russia) Lokomotiv Moscow)

3 goals

- (Brazil) Thanger Nascimento ( (Brazil) Flamengo)
- (Brazil) Anderson Wesley ( (Brazil) Flamengo)
- (Portugal) Duarte Vivo ( (Portugal) Sporting CP)
- (Iran) Mohammad Masoumizadeh ( (Iran) Pars Jonoubi)
- (Iran) Moslem Mesigar ( (Iran) Pars Jonoubi)
- (Iran) Ali Mirshekari ( (Iran) Pars Jonoubi)
- (Japan) Ozu Moreira ( (Russia) Lokomotiv Moscow)
- (Brazil) Deiwerson Pureza Oureza ( (Brazil) Flamengo)
- (Portugal) Jordan Santos ( (Portugal) Sporting CP)

== Final standings ==
Rank	Team	Result
1	(Russia) Lokomotiv Moscow	Champions (2nd title)
2	(Iran) Pars Jonoubi	Runners-up
3	(Brazil) Corinthians	Third place
4	(Brazil) Flamengo	
5	(Spain) Levante	
6	(Brazil) Botafogo	
7	(Argentina) Rosario Central	
8	(Portugal) Sporting CP	
