= Mundialito de Clubes =

- Organiser(s): BSWW
- Founded: 2011
- Region: International (FIFA)
- Teams: 8
- Current champions: (Russia) FC Lokomotiv Moscow (3rd title)
- Most championships: (Russia) Lokomotiv Moscow (3 titles)
- Website: Mundialito de Clubes

The Mundialito de Clubes (English: Club World Cup) is an international club beach soccer competition contested between top men's clubs from around the world. The tournament is loosely similar to the FIFA Club World Cup in association football, however participating teams are not regional champions, instead entering via invitation.

Organised by Beach Soccer Worldwide (BSWW), the competition was founded by BSWW with Brazilian sports agency Koch Tavares in 2011. The first five editions hosted in Brazil whilst the sixth saw the event hosted in Europe; the tournament should not be confused with BSWW's existing Mundialito, which takes place in Portugal for national teams.

Russian side Lokomotiv Moscow is the most successful team with three titles.

== Teams and players ==
In the first two editions (2011 and 2012), squads were specially assembled to represent well known association football clubs from around the world – these teams were incarnated purely to compete in this event. Players of many nationalities (of which they were considered the best of) were invited to play; they were then allocated to one of the clubs specifically for the purpose of the event using a draft system conducted by BSWW. The draft system was then retired.

In the next two editions (2013 and 2015), the clubs and their squads that competed either already exist beforehand (i.e. competed in a domestic club league in their country) or remained specially assembled purely for the competition, but now with squads materialised behind the scenes with players choosing to play for said team at their own discretion rather than via a draft.

Since 2017, all competing teams have been pre-existing clubs that compete in their country's domestic league. Teams are no longer materialised specifically for this event.

== Results ==
Year	Host	Teams	Final			Third Place Match		
Year	Host	Teams	Winners	Score	Runners-up	3rd place	Score	4th place
2011; Details	(Brazil); São Paulo	10	(Brazil); Vasco da Gama	4–2	(Portugal); Sporting CP	(Brazil); Flamengo	5–4 (a.e.t.)	(Russia); Lokomotiv Moscow
2012; Details	(Brazil); São Paulo	12	(Russia); Lokomotiv Moscow	6–4	(Brazil); Flamengo	(Brazil); Vasco da Gama	5–4	(Portugal); Sporting CP
2013; Details	(Brazil); Rio de Janeiro	8	(Brazil); Corinthians	3–3 (a.e.t.); 1–0 (pens)	(Brazil); Flamengo	(Brazil); Vasco da Gama	3–1	(Brazil); Botafogo
2015; Details	(Brazil); Rio de Janeiro	8	(Spain); Barcelona	4–4 (a.e.t.); 3–2 (pens)	(Brazil); Vasco da Gama	(United Arab Emirates); Al-Ahli	4–4 (a.e.t.); 3–2 (pens)	(Brazil); Fluminense
2017; Details	(Brazil); São Paulo	8	(Russia); Lokomotiv Moscow	5–4	(Iran); Pars Jonoubi	(Brazil); Corinthians	3–2	(Brazil); Flamengo
2019; Details	(Russia); Moscow	8	(Portugal); Braga	7–6	(Italy); Catania	(Brazil); Flamengo	4–3	(Russia); Spartak Moscow
2020; Details	(Russia); Moscow	8	(Portugal); Braga	8–3	(Russia); Spartak Moscow	(Russia); Lokomotiv Moscow	6–2	(Japan); Tokyo Verdy
2021; Details	(Russia); Moscow	8	(Russia); Lokomotiv Moscow	6–4	(Portugal); Braga	(Brazil); Vasco da Gama	10–6	(Belarus); Dinamo Minsk

== Performance ==
=== By club ===
Key

- GS – Group stage
- QF – Quarter final

(there were no placement matches for 5th to 12th place pre-2017)

- Apps – Total appearances

Team	2011	2012	2013	2015	2017	2019	2020	2021	Apps
(United Arab Emirates) Al-Ahli	–	GS	GS	3rd	–	–	–	–	3
(Turkey) Alanyaspor	–	–	–	–	–	–	7th	–	1
(Spain) Barcelona	QF	QF	GS	1st	–	–	–	–	4
(Belarus) BATE Borisov	–	–	–	–	–	8th	–	–	1
(Argentina) Boca Juniors	GS	QF	–	–	–	–	–	–	2
(Brazil) Botafogo	–	–	4th	–	6th	–	–	–	2
(Portugal) Braga	–	–	–	–	–	1st	1st	2nd	3
(Italy) Catania	–	–	–	–	–	2nd	–	–	1
(Brazil) Corinthians	QF	QF	1st	GS	3rd	–	–	–	5
(Belarus) Dinamo Minsk	–	–	–	–	–	–	–	4th	1
(Brazil) Flamengo	3rd	2nd	2nd	GS	4th	3rd	6th	–	7
(Brazil) Fluminense	–	–	–	4th	–	–	–	–	1
(Switzerland) Grasshopper	–	–	–	–	–	–	8th	–	1
(Spain) Levante UD	–	–	–	GS	5th	6th	5th	8th	5
(Russia) Lokomotiv Moscow	4th	1st	–	–	1st	7th	3rd	1st	5
(Italy) Milano	GS	QF	GS	–	–	–	–	–	3
(Paraguay) Nacional	–	–	–	–	–	–	–	6th	1
(Iran) Pars Jonoubi	–	–	–	–	2nd	–	–	–	1
(Uruguay) Peñarol	–	–	GS	–	–	–	–	–	1
(Argentina) Rosario Central	–	–	–	–	7th	–	–	–	1
(Brazil) Santos FC	GS	QF	–	–	–	–	–	–	2
(Brazil) São Paulo FC	–	GS	–	–	–	–	–	–	1
(United States) Seattle Sounders	QF	GS	–	–	–	–	–	–	2
(Russia) Spartak Moscow	–	–	–	–	–	4th	2nd	7th	3
(Portugal) Sporting CP	2nd	4th	–	GS	8th	5th	–	–	5
(Japan) Tokyo Verdy	–	–	–	–	–	–	4th	5th	2
(Brazil) Vasco da Gama	1st	3rd	3rd	2nd	–	–	–	3rd	5

=== By country ===
Nation	Winners	Runners-up	Third	Fourth
Russia	3 (2012, 2017,2021)	1 (2020)	1 (2020)	2 (2011, 2019)
Brazil	2 (2011, 2013)	3 (2012, 2013, 2015)	6 (2011, 2012, 2013, 2017, 2019, 2021)	3 (2013, 2015, 2017)
Portugal	2 (2019, 2020)	2 (2011, 2021)	–	1 (2012)
Spain	1 (2015)	–	–	–
Iran	–	1 (2017)	–	–
Italy	–	1 (2019)	–	–
(United Arab Emirates) United Emirates	–	–	1 (2015)	–
Japan	–	–	–	1 (2020)
Belarus	–	–	–	1 (2021)

=== By confederation ===
Confederation	Winners	Runners-up	Third	Fourth
UEFA	6 (2012, 2015, 2017, 2019, 2020, 2021)	4 (2011, 2019, 2020, 2021)	1 (2020)	4 (2011, 2012, 2019, 2021)
CONMEBOL	2 (2011, 2013)	3 (2012, 2013, 2015)	6 (2011, 2012, 2013, 2017, 2019, 2021)	3 (2013, 2015, 2017)
AFC	–	1 (2017)	1 (2015)	1 (2020)

== Awards ==
Year	MVP	Best goalkeeper	Top goalscorer(s)
2011	(Uruguay) Sarandí Pampero (Vasco da Gama)	(Portugal) Paulo Graça (Sporting CP)	(Brazil) André (Flamengo), 16 goals
2012	(Brazil) Benjamin (Flamengo)	(Ukraine) Vitalii Sydorenko (Lokomotiv Moscow)	(Portugal) Madjer (Sporting CP), 10 goals
2013	(Brazil) Mão (Corinthians)	(Brazil) Mão (Corinthians)	(Brazil) Eudin (Flamengo), 7 goals
2015	(Japan) Ozu Moreira (Barcelona)	(French Polynesia) Jonathan Torohia (Barcelona)	(Brazil) Datinha (Barcelona) (Brazil) Lucão (Vasco da Gama) (Brazil) Bokinha (Vasco da Gama) (Brazil) Nelito Oliveira (Sporting CP), 7 goals
2017	(Brazil) Nelito Oliveira (Lokomotiv Moscow)	(Russia) Maxim Chuzhkov (Lokomotiv Moscow)	(Brazil) Igor (Botafogo), 7 goals
2019	(Portugal) Bê Martins (Braga)	(Brazil) Rafael Padilha (Braga)	(Brazil) Lucão (Catania), 12 goals
2020	(Brazil) Filipe (Braga)	(Brazil) Rafael Padilha (Braga)	(Spain) Eduard Suarez (Levante), 10 goals
2021	(Paraguay) Carlos Carballo (Nacional)	(Belarus) Kanstantsin Mahaletsky (Dinamo Minsk)	(Russia) Boris Nikonorov (Lokomotiv Moscow), 8 goals

== See also ==
- BSWW Mundialito
