= 2019 Mundialito de Clubes =

VI Mundialito de Clubes

Tournament details
- Host country: Russia
- Dates: 27 February – 3 March 2019
- Teams: 8 (from 2 confederations)
- Venue: 1 (in 1 host city)

Final positions
- Champions: (Portugal) Braga (1st title)
- Runners-up: (Italy) Catania
- Third place: (Brazil) Flamengo
- Fourth place: (Russia) Spartak Moscow

Tournament statistics
- Matches played: 18
- Goals scored: 165 (9.17 per match)

The 2019 Mundialito de Clubes was the sixth edition of the Mundialito de Clubes (Club World Cup in English), a biennial international club beach soccer competition contested between top men's clubs from across the world.

Organised by Beach Soccer Worldwide (BSWW), the competition took place outside of Brazil for the first time – this edition was hosted in Moscow, Russia between February 27 and March 3, featuring eight clubs. The competition was originally due to take place in São Sebastião, Brazil from 13 to 16 December 2018. However, in November, due to difficulties coordinating with local authorities, BSWW postponed the event until February 2019 and ultimately moved its location to Europe.

Lokomotiv Moscow of Russia were the defending champions but were knocked out in the group stage, ultimately finishing seventh. The tournament was won, for the first time, by Braga of Portugal.

== Teams ==
Despite the competition's title of Club World Cup, in reality, this edition only saw two continents represented: Europe and South America. Additionally, the former dominated the line-up with seven clubs entering. Overall, the eight clubs represented six different countries.

Russian league champions Kristall were originally confirmed to participate when the competition was scheduled for December 2018. But due to a calendar clash, they pulled out when the tournament was pushed back to February.

Confederation	Team(s)
CONMEBOL (South America)	(Brazil) Flamengo
UEFA (Europe)	(Belarus) BATE Borisov (Italy) Catania (Portugal) Sporting CP (Portugal) Braga (Russia) Lokomotiv Moscow (Russia) Spartak Moscow (Spain) Levante

== Squads ==
2019 Mundialito de Clubes squads

(Belarus) BATE Borisov

(Belarus) Mikhail Kavalenko
(Belarus) Valery Makarevich (GK)
(Belarus) Ivan Miranovich
(Belarus) Dzmitry Kamzolov
(Belarus) Yury Cherkasau (GK)
(Belarus) Mikita Chaikouski
(Belarus) Aleh Hapon
(Russia) Artem Voloshin
(Russia) Andrei Kotenev
(Russia) Amadius Vinogradov
(Belarus) Andrei Davidovich

(Portugal) Braga

(Portugal) Jordan Santos
(Portugal) Bruno Torres
(Portugal) Be Martins
(Brazil) Bruno Xavier
(Portugal) Leo Martins
(Brazil) Bokinha
(Brazil) Filipe Silva
(Brazil) Bernardo Botelho
(Portugal) David Assuncao (GK)
(Brazil) Rafael Padilha (GK)

(Italy) Catania

(Belarus) Vadzim Bokach
(Italy) Emmanuele Zurlo
(Italy) Francesco Corosiniti
(Italy) Paolo Palmacci
(Belarus) Ihar Bryshtel
(Italy) Sergio Barravecchia (GK)
(Brazil) Lucão
(Brazil) Josep Junior Gentilin
(Brazil) Frederico da Costa
(Italy) Marcello Montani
(Ukraine) Vitalii Sydorenko (GK)
(Brazil) Rodrigo Souto

(Brazil) Flamengo

(Brazil) Deiwerson Pureza
(Portugal) Elinton Andrade (GK)
(Brazil) Thiago Oliveira (GK)
(Brazil) Filipe Campos (GK)
(Ukraine) Roman Pachev
(Brazil) Junior Paulo Gil
(Russia) Sergei Stepliani
(Brazil) Gustavo da Silva Torres
(Brazil) Paulo Barboza
(Brazil) Alejandro Sales
(Brazil) Thyago Pimenta
(Ukraine) Maksym Voitok

Coach: (Belarus) Yauheni Haiduk

Coach: (Portugal) Antonio Torres

Coach: (Brazil) Fabricio Santos da Silva

Coach: (Brazil) Rodrigo Fernandes Pereira

(Spain) Levante

(Spain) Víctor Viala (GK)
(Spain) Iván Latorre
(Spain) José Miralles
(Spain) Pablo Perez
(Spain) Adrian Frutos
(Spain) Antonio Mayor
(Spain) Daniel Pajón
(Spain) Fernando Guisado
(Spain) Eduard Suarez
(Spain) Francisco Donaire (GK)
(Spain) Salavador "Chiky" Ardil
(Spain) Jose Cintas

(Russia) Lokomotiv Moscow

(Brazil) Rafinha
(Russia) Maksim Rogovskii (GK)
(Spain) Llorenç Gomez
(Russia) Ostap Fedorov
(Russia) Aleksei Krutikov
(Russia) Nikita Safronov
(Russia) Nuritdin Mamadiev
(Russia) Yan Peletskiy
(Russia) Viktor Kryshanov
(Brazil) Antonio
(Russia) Nikolai Kryshanov
(Russia) Mikhail Aygustov (GK)

(Russia) Spartak Moscow

(Russia) Aleksey Makarov
(Russia) Anton Shkarin
(Russia) Iurii Kotov
(Russia) Alexey Pavlenko
(Brazil) Nascimento Thanger
(Russia) Denis Parkhomenko (GK)
(Ukraine) Anatolii Ryabko
(Russia) Andrei Novikov
(Russia) Fedor Zemskov
(Brazil) Catarino
(Russia) Vladimir Raskin
(Russia) Pavel Bazhenov (GK)

(Portugal) Sporting CP

(Portugal) Rui Coimbra
(Portugal) Belchior
(Portugal) Madjer
(Portugal) Tiago Petrony (GK)
(Portugal) Ricardo Baptista
(Portugal) Duarte Vivo
(French Polynesia) Heimanu Taiarui
(Brazil) Alan Santos
(Brazil) Ze Lucas
(Switzerland) Eliott Mounoud (GK)
(Brazil) Jordan Oliveira
(Portugal) Alan

Coach: (Spain) Ángel Torres

Coach: (Russia) Ilya Leonov

Coach: (Russia) Mikhail Likhachev

Coach: (Portugal) José Fonseca

== Venue ==
The Megasport Arena during a basketball game.	Location of Moscow in Russia and Europe

One venue is used in the city of Moscow, Russia.

- The Megasport Sport Palace in Khodynka Field with a capacity of approximately 13,000 hosted all the matches. This is an indoor arena.

== Draw ==
The draw to split the eight teams into two groups of four took place at BSWW headquarters in Barcelona at 16:00 GMT on February 14.

For the purpose of the draw, the clubs were split into two pots of four. Initially, two clubs in Pot 1 were seeded and automatically assigned to the groups.

- to Group A: as the host club, (Russia) Spartak Moscow
- to Group B: as the defending champions, (Russia) Lokomotiv Moscow

The remaining two clubs from Pot 1 were then drawn out; the first was placed into Group A and the second was placed into Group B. The four clubs from Pot 2 were then drawn out; the placement of the clubs alternated back and forth between Groups A and B as each was drawn. Two clubs from the same country could not be placed into the same group.

Pot 1	Pot 2
(Russia) Spartak Moscow (assigned to A1); (Russia) Lokomotiv Moscow (assigned to B1); (Portugal) Braga; (Brazil) Flamengo	(Italy) Catania; (Belarus) BATE Borisov; (Spain) Levante; (Portugal) Sporting CP

== Group stage ==
=== Group A ===
Pos	Team	Pld	W	W+	WP	L	GF	GA	GD	Pts	Qualification
1	(Russia) Spartak Moscow (H)	3	3	0	0	0	12	7	+5	9	Knockout stage
2	(Brazil) Flamengo	3	2	0	0	1	13	8	+5	6	Knockout stage
3	(Portugal) Sporting CP	3	0	1	0	2	11	14	−3	2	Fifth place play-off
4	(Belarus) BATE Borisov	3	0	0	0	3	10	17	−7	0	Seventh place play-off

Source: BSWW
(H) Host
27 February 2019
19:00

Spartak Moscow (Russia)	2–1	(Brazil) Flamengo
Zemskov 8'; Makarov 17'	Report(ru)	36' Andrade

Referee: Gionni Matticoli (Italy)
27 February 2019
20:30

BATE Borisov (Belarus)	4–5 (a.e.t.)	(Portugal) Sporting CP
Vinogradov 5'; Voloshin 10'; Hapon 26', 33'	Report(ru)	11', 27', 34' Ze Lucas; 22' Belchior; 37' Coimbra

Referee: Laurynas Arzuolaitis (Lithuania)

28 February 2019
18:00

Flamengo (Brazil)	6–3	(Belarus) BATE Borisov
Stepliani 2', 3'; Paulinho 11'; Alejandro 21'; Thyago 23'; Gil 24'	Report(ru)	9' (pen.) Kamzolov; 19' Kotenev; 24' Vinogradov

Referee: Viktor Listratov (Russia)
28 February 2019
20:30

Spartak Moscow (Russia)	4–3	(Portugal) Sporting CP
Zemskov 23', 30'; Thanger 24'; Novikov 26'	Report(ru)	26' (pen.) Belchior; 28' Alan; 28' Mounoud

Referee: Ago Kaertmann (Estonia)

1 March 2019
14:00

BATE Borisov (Belarus)	3–6	(Russia) Spartak Moscow
Voloshin 4'; Davidovich 14'; Hapon 15'	Report(ru)	2' Kotov; 6' (o.g.) Chaikouski; 10' Ryabko; 24' Novikov; 29', 34' Zemskov

Referee: Laurynas Arzuolaitis (Lithuania)
1 March 2019
16:30

Sporting CP (Portugal)	3–6	(Brazil) Flamengo
Jordan 16'; Mounoud 26'; Belchior 36'	Report(ru)	2' Paulinho; 2' Stepliani; 18' Alejandro; 21' Pachev; 22' Thyago; 31' Gil

Referee: Gionni Matticoli (Italy)

=== Group B ===
Pos	Team	Pld	W	W+	WP	L	GF	GA	GD	Pts	Qualification
1	(Portugal) Braga	3	2	1	0	0	17	12	+5	8	Knockout stage
2	(Italy) Catania	3	1	0	0	2	22	20	+2	3	Knockout stage
3	(Spain) Levante	3	1	0	0	2	12	17	−5	3	Fifth place play-off
4	(Russia) Lokomotiv Moscow	3	0	1	0	2	19	21	−2	2	Seventh place play-off

Source: BSWW
27 February 2019
14:30

Levante (Spain)	6–4	(Russia) Lokomotiv Moscow
Pajón 8'; Adrian Frutos 19'; Suarez 20', 21'; Chiky 24'; Perez 30'	Report(ru)	1', 11' Llorenç; 4' V. Kryshanov; 5' N. Kryshanov

Referee: Lukasz Ostrowski (Poland)
27 February 2019
16:45

Braga (Portugal)	6–5 (a.e.t.)	(Italy) Catania
Jordan Santos 1', 3'; Bokinha 5', 19'; Torres 14'; Filipe Silva 39'	Report(ru)	10', 11' Bryshtel; 11', 14', 35' Lucão

Referee: Eduards Borisevics (Latvia)

28 February 2019
16:45

Braga (Portugal)	4–1	(Spain) Levante
Filipe Silva 4', 35'; Be Martins 7', 31'	Report(ru)	14' Suarez

Referee: Denis Smolyaninov (Russia)
28 February 2019
19:15

Lokomotiv Moscow (Russia)	9–8 (a.e.t.)	(Italy) Catania
Antonio 9', 16', 24', 39'; V. Kryshanov 12'; Llorenç 27', 38' (pen.), 38'; Fedorov 32'	Report(ru)	9', 23' Zurlo; 25', 27', 38', 39' Lucão; 28' Sydorenko; 30' Bokach

Referee: Vitalij Gomolko (Lithuania)

1 March 2019
19:15

Catania (Italy)	9–5	(Spain) Levante
Lucão 2', 26', 30', 36'; Zurlo 13', 14', 25', 31'; Bryshtel 30'	Report(ru)	5' Chiky; 7' Pajón; 30', 34' Perez; 36' (pen.) Suarez

Referee: Viktor Listratov (Russia)
1 March 2019
20:30

Lokomotiv Moscow (Russia)	6–7	(Portugal) Braga
Safronov 1'; V. Kryshanov 9', 33'; N. Kryshanov 12', 21'; Llorenç 26'	Report(ru)	1', 14' Be Martins; 8' Jordan Santos; 26' Bruno Xavier; 27' Leo Martins; 30' Bokinha; 35' Filipe Silva

Referee: Eduards Borisevics (Latvia)

== 5th-8th place play-offs ==
=== Seventh place play-off ===
2 March 2019
16:45

BATE Borisov (Belarus)	0–7	(Russia) Lokomotiv Moscow
	Report(ru)	4' Peletskiy; 11' Llorenç; 17', 28' V. Kryshanov; 33' Rafinha; 35' Krutikov; 35' Aygustov

Referee: Ago Kaertmann (Estonia)

=== Fifth place play-off ===
2 March 2019
18:00

Sporting CP (Portugal)	9–1	(Spain) Levante
Belchior 9', 36'; Jordan 12', 20', 30', 31'; Coimbra 24', 34'; Ricardinho 33' (pen.)	Report(ru)	21' Suarez

Referee: Eduards Borisevics (Latvia)

== Knockout stage ==
Semi-finals
2 March 2019
(Portugal) Braga	4
(Brazil) Flamengo	0
2 March 2019
(Russia) Spartak Moscow	4 (3)
(Italy) Catania (p)	4 (4)

Final
3 March 2019
(Portugal) Braga	7
(Italy) Catania	6
Third place
3 March 2019
(Brazil) Flamengo	4
(Russia) Spartak Moscow	3

=== Semi-finals ===
2 March 2019
19:15

Braga (Portugal)	4–0	(Brazil) Flamengo
Leo Martins 2'; Padilha 4'; Bruno Xavier 23'; Jordan Santos 31'	Report(ru)

Referee: Lukasz Ostrowski (Poland)
2 March 2019
20:30

Spartak Moscow (Russia)	4–4 (a.e.t.)	(Italy) Catania
Novikov 13'; Ryabko 16'; Makarov 34'; Catarino 34'	Report(ru)	8' Bokach; 18' Genitlin; 31' Zurlo; 33' Bryshtel
Penalties
Nascimento (penalty scored); Ryabko (penalty missed); Makarov (penalty scored); Novikov (penalty scored); Catarino (penalty missed)	3–4	(penalty missed) Corosiniti; (penalty scored) Bryshtel; (penalty scored) Zurlo; (penalty scored) Fred; (penalty scored) Genitlin

Referee: Vitalij Gomolko (Lithuania)

=== Third place play-off ===
3 March 2019
12:00

Flamengo (Brazil)	4–3	(Russia) Spartak Moscow
Andrade 19'; Gustavinho 21'; Piu 28'; Pachev 35'	Report(ru)	3' Pavlenko; 28' Makarov; 36' Shkarin

Referee: Gionni Matticoli (Italy)

=== Final ===
3 March 2019
13:30

Braga (Portugal)	7–6	(Italy) Catania BS
Leo Martins 1', 7'; Jordan Santos 2'; Gentilin 3' (o.g.); Bokinha 19'; Bruno Xavier 24'; Filipe Silva 33'	Report(ru)	2' Sidorenko; 14' Bryshtel; 18' Lucão; 24' Gentilin; 31' Bokach; 33' Zurlo

Referee: Victor Listratov (Russia)

== Awards ==
Best player
(Portugal) Bê Martins ( (Portugal) Braga)
Top scorer
(Brazil) Lucão ( (Italy) Catania BS)
12 goals
Best goalkeeper
(Brazil) Rafael Padilha ( (Portugal) Braga)

== Final standings ==
Rank	Team	Result
1	(Portugal) Braga	Champions (1st title)
2	(Italy) Catania	Runners-up
3	(Brazil) Flamengo	Third place
4	(Russia) Spartak Moscow	
5	(Portugal) Sporting CP	
6	(Spain) Levante	
7	(Russia) Lokomotiv Moscow	
8	(Belarus) BATE Borisov	
