= CA Boca Juniors (beach soccer) =

Football club in Argentina

- Full name: CA Boca Juniors
- Nickname: Los Xeneizes (The Genoese)
- Short name: Boca Juniors
- Coach: Gustavo Casado
Home colours
Away colours

CA Boca Juniors has a professional beach soccer team based in Argentina.

== Mundialito de Clubes 2012 squad ==
Note: Flags indicate national team as defined under FIFA eligibility rules; some limited exceptions apply. Players may hold more than one non-FIFA nationality.

No.	Pos.	Nation	Player
—	GK	ITA	Simone Del Mestre
—	DF	ARG	Cesar Leguizamon
—	DF	BRA	Dino Tambaú
—	DF	ARG	Luciano Franceschini
—	MF	URU	Nicolas Bella

No.	Pos.	Nation	Player
—	MF	MEX	Victor Lopez
—	FW	BRA	Fred
—	FW	ARG	Javier Vivas
—	FW	ARG	Rodriguez Larreta
—	GK	ARG	Sebastian Gomez Polatti

Coach: Gustavo Casado

== Honours ==
=== International competitions ===
- Mundialito de Clubes
  - Quarter Final: 2012
  - Group Stage: 2011
