= 2012 Mundialito de Clubes =

II Mundialito de Clubes

Tournament details
- Host country: Brazil
- Dates: 12 – 19 May 2012
- Teams: 12 (from 4 confederations)
- Venue: 1 (in 1 host city)

Final positions
- Champions: (Russia) Lokomotiv Moscow (1st title)
- Runners-up: (Brazil) Flamengo
- Third place: (Brazil) Vasco da Gama
- Fourth place: (Portugal) Sporting CP

Tournament statistics
- Matches played: 26
- Goals scored: 194 (7.46 per match)
- Top scorer(s): (Portugal) Madjer ( (Portugal) Sporting CP) (10 goals)
- Best player: (Brazil) Benjamin ( (Brazil) Flamengo)

The second Mundialito de Clubes (or Club World Cup) was a beach soccer tournament that took place at the Praia do Sol stadium at the Arena Guarapiranga sport complex, located near Represa de Guarapiranga, a reservoir located in São Paulo, Brazil from 12 – 19 May 2012. The stadium has a seating capacity of 3,500 spectators.

== Participating teams ==
Twelve teams confirmed their participation in this year's tournament, an increase of two teams who participated last year:

GROUP A	GROUP B	GROUP C
(Argentina) Boca Juniors	(Spain) Barcelona	(United Arab Emirates) Al-Ahli
(Italy) Milan	(Brazil) Flamengo	(Brazil) Corinthians
(Brazil) Santos	(Brazil) São Paulo	(Russia) Lokomotiv Moscow
(Brazil) Vasco da Gama	(United States) Seattle Sounders	(Portugal) Sporting CP

== Draft procedure ==
On 25 April 2012, at the Beach Soccer Worldwide headquarters in Barcelona, Spain, the Official Draft took place, with each team selecting ten players each. Each team has until 2159 GMT on 27 April 2012 to complete any player transfers and also the confirmation of a possible former football star (to be approved by Beach Soccer Worldwide).

According to the draft procedure, the team representative of every Club is to attend that meeting in the two aforementioned venue, and he will be the responsible of picking the players for his squad. All Beach Soccer players can be potentially selected, and, just as it happens in great events for leagues such as the NBA, NHL or Major League Baseball, in order to set a balanced, competitive tournament, the Draft for the players’ election will follow some guidelines.

== Players ==
The 'Draft' followed the following criteria: three national players (chosen beforehand), three continental players (up two from the same country), a player UEFA / CONMEBOL (South America and Europe), a player from AFC / CAF / CONCACAF / OFC (Asia / Africa / North America and the Caribbean / Oceania) player and a 'national'.

== Squads ==
=== Al-Ahli ===
Coach: Tabib Hilal
(United Arab Emirates) Abbas Hussain (GK)	(United Arab Emirates); Al-Ahli	(United Arab Emirates) Adil Ali
(United Arab Emirates) Rami Al Mesaabi	(United Arab Emirates); Al-Ahli	(Brazil) Datinha
(United Arab Emirates) Qambar Sadeqi	(United Arab Emirates); Al-Ahli	(Mexico) Benjamin Mosco
(Japan) Takeshi	(United Arab Emirates); Al-Ahli	(Japan) Shingo Terukina (GK)
(Switzerland) Philipp Borer	(United Arab Emirates); Al-Ahli	(Oman) Hani Al Dhabit
(United Arab Emirates) Bakhit Mubarak	(United Arab Emirates); Al-Ahli	

=== Barcelona ===
Coach: Ramiro Amarelle
(Spain) Cristian Torres	(Spain); Barcelona	(Portugal) Bruno Torres
(Spain) Javier Torres	(Spain); Barcelona	(Senegal) Al Seyni N'Diaye (GK)
(Spain) Nico	(Spain); Barcelona	(Russia) Egor Eremeev
(Russia) Andrey Bukhlitskiy (GK)	(Spain); Barcelona	(Spain) Ramiro Amarelle
(Russia) Dmitry Shishin	(Spain); Barcelona	(Brazil) Rui Mota
(Spain) Bakero	(Spain); Barcelona	

=== Boca Juniors ===
Coach: Gustavo Casado
(Argentina) Cesar Leguizamon	(Argentina); Boca Juniors	(Brazil) Fred
(Argentina) Luciano Franceschini	(Argentina); Boca Juniors	(Mexico) Victor Lopez
(Argentina) Rodriguez Larreta	(Argentina); Boca Juniors	(Italy) Simone Del Mestre (GK)
(Uruguay) Nicolas Bella	(Argentina); Boca Juniors	(Argentina) Javier Vivas
(Brazil) Dino Tambaú	(Argentina); Boca Juniors	(Argentina) Sebastian Gomez Polatti (GK)

=== Corinthians ===
Coach: Alexandre Soares
(Brazil) Mão (GK)	(Brazil); Corinthians	(Argentina) Cesar Mendoza (GK)
(Brazil) Buru	(Brazil); Corinthians	(Venezuela) Edgar Quintero
(Brazil) André	(Brazil); Corinthians	(Oman) Yahya Al-Araimi
(Argentina) Minici	(Brazil); Corinthians	(Brazil) Clebinho
(Russia) Yuri Krashenninikov	(Brazil); Corinthians	(Brazil) Juninho Alagoano
(Brazil) Marcelinho Carioca	(Brazil); Corinthians	

=== Flamengo ===
Coach: Rogério Vilela
(Brazil) Souza	(Brazil); Flamengo	(Brazil) Casé
(Brazil) Anderson	(Brazil); Flamengo	(Italy) Bernardo Tell
(Brazil) Benjamin	(Brazil); Flamengo	(Mexico) Miguel Estrada (GK)
(Uruguay) Pampero	(Brazil); Flamengo	(Brazil) Robertinho (GK)
(Uruguay) Matías Isaias Cabrera	(Brazil); Flamengo	(Chile) Mena

=== Lokomotiv Moscow ===
Coach: Ilya Leonov
(Russia) Ilya Leonov	(Russia); Lokomotiv Moscow	(Ukraine) Vitali Sydorenko (GK)
(Russia) Anton Shkarin	(Russia); Lokomotiv Moscow	(Brazil) Daniel Lima
(Russia) Egor Shaykov	(Russia); Lokomotiv Moscow	(United Arab Emirates) Humaid Jamal (GK)
(Lithuania) Nerijus Barasa	(Russia); Lokomotiv Moscow	(Russia) Yuri Gorchinskiy
(Ukraine) Igor Borsuk	(Russia); Lokomotiv Moscow	(Russia) Aleksey Makarov
(Russia) Aleksandr Filimonov (GK)	(Russia); Lokomotiv Moscow	

=== Milan ===
Coach: Emiliano del Duca
(Italy) Roberto Pasquali	(Italy); Milan	(Switzerland) Stephan Meier
(Italy) Stefano Spada (GK)	(Italy); Milan	(Brazil) Juninho Erivaldo Santos
(Italy) Dario Ramaciotti	(Italy); Milan	(Italy) Angelo D'Amico
(Switzerland) Dejan Stankovic	(Italy); Milan	(Italy) Paolo Palmacci
(France) Stephane François	(Italy); Milan	(El Salvador) Jose E. Portillo (GK)
(Brazil) Dida (GK)	(Italy); Milan	

=== Santos ===
Coach: Gilberto Costa
(Brazil) Bruno Malias	(Brazil); Santos	(Mexico) Hector Robles (GK)
(Brazil) Lekão	(Brazil); Santos	(Spain) Kuman
(Brazil) Sidney	(Brazil); Santos	(Brazil) Rafael Stocco
(Uruguay) Ricar	(Brazil); Santos	(Brazil) Rafael Amorim
(Uruguay) Leandro (GK)	(Brazil); Santos	(Argentina) Lucas Medero

=== São Paulo ===
Coach: Vitor "Gaucho" Fonseca
(Argentina) Adielson	(Brazil); São Paulo	(Germany) Dannilo Neumann
(Brazil) Rafinha	(Brazil); São Paulo	(Mexico) Angel Rodriguez
(Brazil) Alan Freitas	(Brazil); São Paulo	(Brazil) Everton Matos
(Ecuador) Virley Conforme	(Brazil); São Paulo	(Brazil) Luis Alberto
(Argentina) Federico Hilaire	(Brazil); São Paulo	(Chile) Orlando Echeverria

=== Seattle Sounders ===
Coach: Marcelo Mendes
(United States) Michael McAndrews (GK)	(United States); Seattle Sounders	(El Salvador) Agustin Ruiz
(Brazil) Oscar Gil	(United States); Seattle Sounders	(Brazil) César Esteves (GK)
(United States) Nicky	(United States); Seattle Sounders	(United Arab Emirates) Ali Karim
(Mexico) Francisco Cati	(United States); Seattle Sounders	(United States) Francis Farberoff
(Mexico) Morgan Plata	(United States); Seattle Sounders	(Japan) Ozu Moreira

=== Sporting CP ===
Coach: Alexandre Julião
(Portugal) Madjer	(Portugal); Sporting CP	(Switzerland) Moritz Jaeggy
(Portugal) Alan	(Portugal); Sporting CP	(Brazil) Fernando DDI
(Portugal) Belchior	(Portugal); Sporting CP	(Portugal) Rui Coimbra
(Italy) Michele Leghissa	(Portugal); Sporting CP	(Portugal) Paulo Graça (GK)
(Switzerland) Sandro Spaccarotella	(Portugal); Sporting CP	(United Arab Emirates) Ahmed Dad (GK)
(Portugal) Carlos Xavier	(Portugal); Sporting CP	

=== Vasco da Gama ===
Coach: Rodrigo "Chumbinho" Freitas
(Brazil) Bueno	(Brazil); Vasco da Gama	(Uruguay) Gustavo Sebe (GK)
(Brazil) Bruno Xavier	(Brazil); Vasco da Gama	(Portugal) Bernardo Botelho
(Brazil) Jorginho	(Brazil); Vasco da Gama	(Mexico) Ricardo Villalobos
(Paraguay) Jose Echeverria	(Brazil); Vasco da Gama	(Brazil) Mauricinho
(Argentina) Marcelo Salgueiro (GK)	(Brazil); Vasco da Gama	(Brazil) Gil

== Group stage ==
The draw to divide the teams into three groups of four was conducted on 24 April 2012.

All kickoff times are of local time in São Paulo, (UTC-3).

=== Group A ===
Team	Pld	W	W+	L	GF	GA	+/-	Pts
(Brazil) Santos	3	2	0	1	15	9	+6	6
(Argentina) Boca Juniors	3	2	0	1	11	11	0	6
(Brazil) Vasco da Gama	3	2	0	1	11	12	−1	6
(Italy) Milan	3	0	0	3	9	14	−5	0

Clinched quarterfinal berth

13 May 2012
12:00

Vasco da Gama (Brazil)	3 – 7 (0 – 0, 2 – 5, 1 – 2)	(Brazil) Santos
Gil 20'; Bruno Xavier 23'; Mauricinho 26'	Report	17', 31' Rafinha Carioca; 18', 21' Bruno Malias; 19' Rafinha; 22', 35' Kuman

Praia do Sol, Arena Guarapiranga, São Paulo

13 May 2012
14:30

Milan (Italy)	4 – 5 (3 – 3, 0 – 1, 1 – 1)	(Argentina) Boca Juniors
D. Stankovic 5'; P. Palmacci 7', 36'; R. Pasquali 8'	Report	8' Dino Tambau; 9', 11' S. Larreta; 24' Fred; 31' V. Lopez

Praia do Sol, Arena Guarapiranga, São Paulo

14 May 2012
16:30

Boca Juniors (Argentina)	3 – 5 (1 – 5, 2 – 0, 0 – 0)	(Brazil) Vasco da Gama
S. Larreta 10'; Dino Tambau 14'; L. Franceschini 22'	Report	1', 1', 11' Bruno Xavier; 2', 10' Mauricinho

Praia do Sol, Arena Guarapiranga, São Paulo

14 May 2012
19:00

Santos (Brazil)	6 – 3 (0 – 1, 2 – 0, 4 – 2)	(Italy) Milan
Rafael Amorim 16', 33'; Kuman 24', 35'; Bruno Malias 27', 28'	Report	10' S. Meier; 33' S. François; 36' D. Ramaciotti

Praia do Sol, Arena Guarapiranga, São Paulo

15 May 2012
13:45

Vasco da Gama (Brazil)	3 – 2 (1 – 1, 0 – 1, 2 – 0)	(Italy) Milan
Mauricinho 6'; Bernardo Botelho 34'; Jorginho 35'	Report	10' Juninho; 17' P. Palmacci

Praia do Sol, Arena Guarapiranga, São Paulo

15 May 2012
16:30

Santos (Brazil)	2 – 3 (0 – 2, 1 – 1, 1 – 0)	(Argentina) Boca Juniors
Rafinha Carioca 15'; Sidney 36'	Report	3' N. Bella; 9' C. Leguizamon; 13' S. Larreta

Praia do Sol, Arena Guarapiranga, São Paulo

=== Group B ===
Team	Pld	W	W+	L	GF	GA	+/-	Pts
(Spain) Barcelona	3	2	1	0	15	9	+6	7
(Brazil) Flamengo	3	2	0	1	8	5	+3	6
(United States) Seattle Sounders	3	1	0	2	6	8	−2	3
(Brazil) São Paulo	3	0	0	3	8	16	−8	0

Clinched quarterfinal berth

12 May 2012
11:45

Flamengo (Brazil)	2 – 3 (0 – 1, 0 – 2, 2 – 0)	(Spain) Barcelona
Pampero 27'; Souza 30'	Report	12' J. Torres; 20' R. Amarelle; 23' D. Shishin

Praia do Sol, Arena Guarapiranga, São Paulo

12 May 2012
13:00

São Paulo (Brazil)	2 – 3 (0 – 1, 2 – 1, 0 – 1)	(United States) Seattle Sounders
D. Neumann 13'; Rafinha 17'	Report	9' F. Cati; 23' M. Plata; 35' A. Ruiz

Praia do Sol, Arena Guarapiranga, São Paulo

14 May 2012
15:15

Barcelona (Spain)	10 – 5 (2 – 1, 2 – 1, 6 – 3)	(Brazil) São Paulo
C. Torres 2', 15', 26'; D. Shishin 4', 28', 32'; E. Eremeev 16', 34'; Rui Mota 26'; B. Torres 31'	Report	5', 27', 28' Rafinha; 16', 26' Alan Freitas

Praia do Sol, Arena Guarapiranga, São Paulo

14 May 2012
17:45

Flamengo (Brazil)	4 – 1 (1 – 1, 3 – 0, 0 – 0)	(United States) Seattle Sounders
Souza 1', 20', 21'; Anderson 23'	Report	10' Ali Karim

Praia do Sol, Arena Guarapiranga, São Paulo

15 May 2012
12:30

Barcelona (Spain)	2 – 2 (a.e.t.) (0 – 0, 1 – 0, 0 – 1, 1 – 1)	(United States) Seattle Sounders
B. Torres 24'; D. Shishin 39'	Report	36' A. Ruiz; 38' M. Plata
Penalties
R. Amarelle (penalty scored)	1–0	(penalty missed) F. Farberhoff

Praia do Sol, Arena Guarapiranga, São Paulo

15 May 2012
19:00

Flamengo (Brazil)	2 – 1 (1 – 0, 1 – 0, 0 – 1)	(Brazil) São Paulo
Anderson 8'; Mena 18'	Report	36' Rafinha

Praia do Sol, Arena Guarapiranga, São Paulo

=== Group C ===
Team	Pld	W	W+	L	GF	GA	+/-	Pts
(Brazil) Corinthians	3	2	0	1	15	9	+6	6
(Russia) Lokomotiv Moscow	3	2	0	1	11	8	+3	6
(Portugal) Sporting CP	3	2	0	1	10	9	+1	6
(United Arab Emirates) Al-Ahli	3	0	0	3	6	16	−10	0

Clinched quarterfinal berth

12 May 2012
10:15

Sporting CP (Portugal)	4 – 3 (0 – 1, 2 – 1, 2 – 1)	(Brazil) Corinthians
Alan 14'; Madjer 19'; N. Belchior 30'; Fernando DDI 34'	Report	5' Y. Krashenninikov; 19' Klebinho; 36' Buru

Praia do Sol, Arena Guarapiranga, São Paulo

12 May 2012
14:15

Al-Ahli (United Arab Emirates)	2 – 4 (0 – 1, 0 – 2, 2 – 1)	(Russia) Lokomotiv Moscow
R. Al Mesaabi 29'; P. Borer 31'	Report	11' D. Lima; 13' I. Leonov; 13' E. Shaykov; 27' A. Makarov

Praia do Sol, Arena Guarapiranga, São Paulo

13 May 2012
10:45

Sporting CP (Portugal)	3 – 5 (1 – 2, 2 – 3, 0 – 0)	(Russia) Lokomotiv Moscow
S. Spaccarotella 2'; Alan 15'; Madjer 20'	Report	1' I. Leonov; 6' E. Shaykov; 14' A. Makarov; 18' D. Lima; 22' N. Barasa

Praia do Sol, Arena Guarapiranga, São Paulo

13 May 2012
13:15

Corinthians (Brazil)	9 – 3 (4 – 1, 0 – 1, 5 – 1)	(United Arab Emirates) Al-Ahli
Buru 3'; Juninho Alagoano 7', 11'; Y. Al Araimi 11'; André 25', 31'; Y. Krashenninikov 28'; Marcelinho 36'	Report	3', 34' Datinha; 19' B. Mubarak; 35' (o.g.) R. Al Mesaabi

Praia do Sol, Arena Guarapiranga, São Paulo

15 May 2012
15:15

Corinthians (Brazil)	3 – 2 (1 – 0, 0 – 1, 2 – 1)	(Russia) Lokomotiv Moscow
Juninho Alagoano 10', 35'; André 36'	Report	24', 36' I. Borsuk

Praia do Sol, Arena Guarapiranga, São Paulo

15 May 2012
17:45

Sporting CP (Portugal)	3 – 1 (1 – 0, 1 – 0, 1 – 1)	(United Arab Emirates) Al-Ahli
Madjer 3', 19', 28'	Report	35' Datinha

Praia do Sol, Arena Guarapiranga, São Paulo

== Knockout stage ==
A draw was held after the group stage matches were completed to determine the quarterfinal pairings.

Quarter-finals
16 May 2012
(Spain) Barcelona	2
(Portugal) Sporting CP	4
16 May 2012
(Argentina) Boca Juniors	6 (1)
(Russia) Lokomotiv Moscow (a.e.t.)	6 (2)
16 May 2012
(Brazil) Santos	3
(Brazil) Flamengo	6
16 May 2012
(Brazil) Corinthians	0
(Brazil) Vasco da Gama	1

Semi-finals
18 May 2012
(Portugal) Sporting CP	7
(Russia) Lokomotiv Moscow	10
18 May 2012
(Brazil) Flamengo	3
(Brazil) Vasco da Gama	2

Final
19 May 2012
(Russia) Lokomotiv Moscow	6
(Brazil) Flamengo	4
Third place
19 May 2012
(Portugal) Sporting CP	4
(Brazil) Vasco da Gama	5

=== Quarterfinals ===
16 May 2012
13:30

Barcelona (Spain)	2 – 4 (0 – 0, 2 – 2, 0 – 2)	(Portugal) Sporting CP
D. Shishin 15'; E. Eremeev 21'	Report	14' S. Spaccarotella; 20' Fernando DDI; 36' N. Belchior; 36' Madjer

Praia do Sol, Arena Guarapiranga, São Paulo

16 May 2012
15:00

Boca Juniors (Argentina)	6 – 6 (a.e.t) (2 – 2, 3 – 3, 1 – 1, 0 – 0)	(Russia) Lokomotiv Moscow
Dino Tambau 3', 15', 29'; N. Bella 8'; S. Larreta 15'; C. Leguizamon 20'	Report	3' E. Shaykov; 12' I. Borsuk; 16', 19' N. Barasa; 23' A. Makarov; 35' I. Leonov
Penalties
Fred (penalty scored); S. Larreta (penalty missed)	1–2	(penalty scored) I. Leonov; (penalty scored) Y. Gorchinskiy

Praia do Sol, Arena Guarapiranga, São Paulo

16 May 2012
16:15

Santos (Brazil)	3 – 6 (0 – 1, 0 – 1, 3 – 4)	(Brazil) Flamengo
Ricar 31', 32'; Sidney 31'	Report	3', 21', 30' Anderson; 29', 32' Pampero; 34' Mena

Praia do Sol, Arena Guarapiranga, São Paulo

16 May 2012
17:30

Corinthians (Brazil)	0 – 1 (0 – 1, 0 – 0, 0 – 0)	(Brazil) Vasco da Gama
	Report	12' Catarino

Praia do Sol, Arena Guarapiranga, São Paulo

=== Semifinals ===
18 May 2012
17:30

Sporting CP (Portugal)	7 – 10 (1 – 3, 1 – 4, 5 – 3)	(Russia) Lokomotiv Moscow
N. Belchior 12'; Rui Coimbra 14'; Madjer 27', 28', 31'; Fernando DDI 35', 36'	Report	7', 18' E. Shaykov; 12', 12', 15' A. Makarov; 14', 35' D. Lima; 21' I. Borsuk; 26' I. Leonov; 36' Y. Gorchinskiy

Praia do Sol, Arena Guarapiranga, São Paulo

18 May 2012
19:15

Flamengo (Brazil)	3 – 2 (0 – 1, 2 – 0, 1 – 1)	(Brazil) Vasco da Gama
Bernardo Tell 16', 21'; Benjamin 26'	Report	2', 28' Bruno Xavier

Praia do Sol, Arena Guarapiranga, São Paulo

=== Third place playoff ===
19 May 2012
8:45

Sporting CP (Portugal)	4 – 5 (1 – 0, 2 – 2, 1 – 3)	(Brazil) Vasco da Gama
N. Belchior 6'; Fernando DDI 17'; Alan 24'; Madjer 30'	Report	15', 28' Catarino; 24' Mauricinho; 28' Gil; 29' Jorginho

Praia do Sol, Arena Guarapiranga, São Paulo

=== Final ===
19 May 2012
10:15

Lokomotiv Moscow (Russia)	6 – 4 (1 – 2, 1 – 0, 4 – 2)	(Brazil) Flamengo
Y. Gorchinskiy 11', 23'; A. Shkarin 30'; A. Makarov 33', 36'; D. Lima 34'	Report	6', 12', 27' Benjamin; 35' Bernardo Tell

Praia do Sol, Arena Guarapiranga, São Paulo

== Winners ==
II Mundialito de Clubes Beach Soccer
Winners:

FC Lokomotiv Moscow (beach soccer)
First title

== Awards ==
Best Player (MVP)
(Brazil) Benjamin ( (Brazil) Flamengo)
Top Scorer
(Portugal) Madjer ( (Portugal) Sporting CP)
10 goals
Best Goalkeeper
(Ukraine) Vitali Sydorenko ( (Russia) Lokomotiv Moscow)

== See also ==
- Beach soccer
- Beach Soccer Worldwide
