= Diogo Catarino =

Brazilian beach soccer player (born 1990)

Personal information
- Full name: Diogo Catarino da Silva
- Date of birth: 9 January 1990 (age 36)
- Place of birth: Rio de Janeiro, Brazil
- Height: 1.83 m (6 ft 0 in)
- Position: Defender

Team information
- Current team: Vasco da Gama
- Number: 4

Senior career*
Years	Team	Apps	(Gls)
2011–2013; 2014–2018; 2020–	Vasco da Gama		
2013	Milan		
2016	Sporting CP		
2017	Braga; Lokomotiv Moscow		
2019; 2022–	Catania Beach Soccer		
2021	Khor Fakkan		

International career
2013–	Brazil	92	(26)
- * Club domestic league appearances and goals

Diogo Catarino da Silva (born 9 January 1990), known as Catarino, is a Brazilian beach soccer player who plays as a defender (fixo). He is the captain of the Brazil national beach soccer team and wears the number 4 jersey. He currently plays for Vasco da Gama.

== Early life ==
Born in Rio de Janeiro, Catarino began his career with the beach soccer section of Vasco da Gama, where he won multiple domestic and continental titles.

== Club career ==
He has since played for several European and international clubs, including Milan (Italian champion 2013), Sporting CP, Braga (European Club Cup and Elite champion 2017), Lokomotiv Moscow (Russian champion 2017), Catania Beach Soccer (Italian Cup 2019), and Khor Fakkan (UAE Cup 2021).

== International career ==
Catarino debuted for Brazil around 2013 and is the current captain of the team. He helped Brazil win the FIFA Beach Soccer World Cup in 2017 (Bahamas) and 2024 (UAE), plus the 2025 edition.

Other honours include the Copa América (2016), Mundialito (2016, 2017), Intercontinental Cup (2016), South American Championship (2016), and gold at the ANOC World Beach Games (2019). He has over 30 FIFA Beach Soccer World Cup appearances;

== Honours ==
Vasco da Gama

- Copa Libertadores de Beach Soccer: Winners (4): 2016, 2017, 2019, 2024
- Campeonato Brasileiro de Clubes de Beach Soccer: Winners (3): 2017, 2019, 2020
- Copa do Brasil: Winners (3): 2012, 2014, 2025
- Circuito Brasileiro: 2013/14
- Copa Marinha: 2015
- Desafio Fair Play: 2013
- Mundialito de Clubes: Runners-up 2015; Third place: 2012, 2021

Other clubs

- Milan – Campeonato Italiano: 2013
- Braga – Taça Europeia de Clubes: 2017; Campeonato de Elite: 2017
- Lokomotiv Moscow – Campeonato Russo: 2017
- Sporting CP – Campeonato de Elite: 2016
- Catania – Coppa Italia: 2019
- Khor Fakkan – UAE Cup: 2021

Brazil

- FIFA Beach Soccer World Cup: Winners (3 personal): 2017, 2024, 2025
- Copa América de Beach Soccer: 2016, 2023
- Mundialito de Beach Soccer: 2016, 2017
- Copa Intercontinental: 2016
- ANOC World Beach Games: Gold 2019
- Campeonato Sul-Americano de Beach Soccer (South American Championship): 2016
- Eliminatórias para a Copa do Mundo FIFA de Futebol de Areia (qualifiers): 2017, 2019
- Liga Sul-Americana de Beach Soccer: 2019: 2019
- Copa América de Beach Soccer: 2023
- CONMEBOL Liga Evolución Beach Soccer: 2026
