= 2021 Euro Winners Cup =

Tournament details
- Host country: Portugal
- Dates: 12–18 July
- Teams: 50 (from 1 confederation)
- Venues: 4 (in 1 host city)

Final positions
- Champions: (Russia) Kristall (4th title)
- Runners-up: (Portugal) Braga
- Third place: (Spain) San Francisco
- Fourth place: (Germany) Real Münster

Tournament statistics
- Matches played: 120
- Goals scored: 1,045 (8.71 per match)
- Top scorer(s): (Portugal) Bernardo Lopes (18 goals)
- Best player: (Brazil) Mauricinho
- Best goalkeeper: (Russia) Maxim Chuzhkov

The 2021 Euro Winners Cup was the ninth edition of the Euro Winners Cup (EWC), an annual continental beach soccer tournament for men's top-division European clubs. The championship is the sport's version of the better known UEFA Champions League in association football.

Organised by Beach Soccer Worldwide (BSWW), the tournament was held in Nazaré, Portugal from 12–18 July.

The event began with a round robin group stage. At its conclusion, the best teams progressed to the knockout stage, a series of single elimination games to determine the winners, starting with the Round of 32 and ending with the final. Consolation matches were also played to determine other final rankings.

Kristall of Russia were the defending champions and successfully defended their title, defeating Braga in the final in what was a repeat of the concluding match of the last edition. This moved Kristall clear of Braga in terms of the most titles won, with four.

== Teams ==
=== Qualification ===
Usually, to enter automatically, a club needed to be the champions of their country's most recent national championship (and for Europe's strongest leagues, the runners-up and third placed clubs can also enter). Any club that didn't meet these requirement was entitled to enter the accompanying Euro Winners Challenge (preliminary round) to take place in the days prior to the competition proper, as a last opportunity to qualify for the EWC main round.

But as with the previous year, due to the effect of the COVID-19 pandemic on the competition, the normal rules regarding qualification were abandoned. The Euro Winners Challenge (preliminary round) did not take place; entry restrictions were relaxed: the event was opened up to simply any European club that wished to participate. All clubs entered straight into the group stage.

=== Entrants ===
50 clubs from 16 different nations entered the event.

Key: H: Hosts \ TH: Title holders

Group stage
Portugal (17)	ACD O Sótão (H)	Spain (5)	Levante	Germany (2)	Real Münster
Portugal (17)	ACD O Sótão Norte	Spain (5)	Melistar	Germany (2)	Rostocker Robben
Portugal (17)	Belenenses	Spain (5)	San Javier	Georgia (2)	Dinamo Batumi
Portugal (17)	Braga	Spain (5)	San Francisco	Georgia (2)	Telavi
Portugal (17)	Buarcos 2017	Spain (5)	Torrejón	Israel (2)	Kfar Qassem
Portugal (17)	Caxinas	Russia (4)	Delta Saratov	Israel (2)	Rosh HaAyin
Portugal (17)	CB Caldas Rainha	Russia (4)	Kristall (TH)	Moldova (2)	Djoker Chişinău
Portugal (17)	CB Loures	Russia (4)	Krylya Sovetov	Moldova (2)	Nistru Chișinău
Portugal (17)	Chaves	Russia (4)	Lokomotiv Moscow	Sweden (2)	Norsjö
Portugal (17)	GRAP	Ukraine (3)	Artur Music	Sweden (2)	Stockholm
Portugal (17)	Nacional	Ukraine (3)	Molniya	Italy (1)	Viareggio
Portugal (17)	Nazarenos	Ukraine (3)	Servit	Denmark (1)	Copenhagen
Portugal (17)	Porto Mendo	Belgium (3)	La Louvière	Greece (1)	Napoli Patron
Portugal (17)	Sesimbra	Belgium (3)	Newteam Brainois	Czech Republic (1)	Bohemians 1905
Portugal (17)	Sporting CP	Belgium (3)	Newteam Brussels	Bulgaria (1)	Spartak Varna
Portugal (17)	Varzim	France (3)	La Grande-Motte Pyramide		
Portugal (17)	Vila Flor	France (3)	Marseille BT		
Portugal (17)		France (3)	Marseille Minots		

== Venues ==
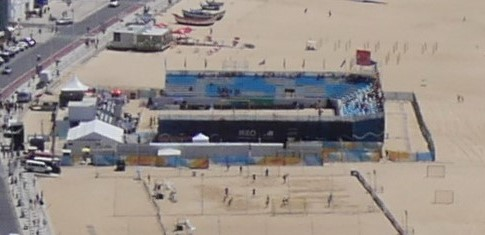
The main Estádio do Viveiro and external Pitch 2 seen below, in 2019.

Four venues are used in one host city: Nazaré, Leiria District, Portugal.

Matches took place at Praia de Nazaré (Nazaré Beach) on one of four pitches. One seated arena, the Estádio do Viveiro (Viveiro Stadium), and three purpose made pitches, located adjacent to the main stadium, simply known as Pitch 2, Pitch 3 and Pitch 4.

== Draw ==
The draw to split the 50 clubs into 13 groups (11 of four and two of three) took place at 13:00 CEST (UTC+2) on 7 July at BSWW's headquarters in Barcelona, Spain.

== Group stage ==
The top two teams from each group, and the best six third places teams, advanced to the round of 32.

All kickoff times are local, WEST (UTC+1) and were those scheduled; actual times may have differed slightly.

=== Group A ===
Pos	Team	Pld	W	W+	WP	L	GF	GA	GD	Pts	Qualification
1	ACD O Sótão (H)	3	3	0	0	0	18	5	+13	9	Knockout stage
2	Norsjö	3	2	0	0	1	11	10	+1	6	Knockout stage
3	Belenenses	3	1	0	0	2	7	12	−5	3	
4	Djoker Chişinău	3	0	0	0	3	8	17	−9	0	

Source: BSWW
(H) Host

12 July 2021	Belenenses (Portugal)	5–2	(Moldova) Djoker Chişinău	Pitch 4
09:30	Macau 4'; Nuno Martins 21'; Iga 29', 36', 36'	Report	1' Schiopu; 31' Sirghi	Referee: Francisco Bumedien (Spain)

12 July 2021	Norsjö (Sweden)	1–6	(Portugal) ACD O Sótão	Estádio do Viveiro
16:00	Ekholm 10'	Report	2', 24', 25', 27' Duarte Vivo; 2' Fabinho; 8' Vidinha	Referee: Malte Gerhardt (Germany)

13 July 2021	Djoker Chişinău (Moldova)	3–6	(Sweden) Norsjö	Pitch 3
09:30	Iordachi 11', 31'; Sirghi 19'	Report	1', 10', 16' Olofsson; 2', 8' Wiklund; 19' Andersson	Referee: Francisco Costa (Portugal)

13 July 2021	ACD O Sótão (Portugal)	6–1	(Portugal) Belenenses	Estádio do Viveiro
16:00	Samuel Mendes 2'; Fabinho 10'; Francisco Mota 26', 36'; Hardzetski 27', 36'	Report	35' Cosmeli	Referee: Murat Ergin Gozutok (Turkey)

14 July 2021	ACD O Sótão (Portugal)	6–3	(Moldova) Djoker Chişinău	Estádio do Viveiro
16:00	Duarte Vivo 1', 10'; Fabinho 10', 32'; Hardzetski 15'; Novikau 17'	Report	17' Timbalist; 24' Munteanu; 30' Cerescu	Referee: Fiammetta Susanna (Italy)

14 July 2021	Belenenses (Portugal)	1–4	(Sweden) Norsjö	Pitch 2
17:15	Rafa 28'	Report	17' Englund; 18' Wiklund; 21' Ekholm; 35' Olofsson	Referee: Jurijs Ivusins (Latvia)

=== Group B ===
Pos	Team	Pld	W	W+	WP	L	GF	GA	GD	Pts	Qualification
1	San Francisco	3	2	0	1	0	16	10	+6	7	Knockout stage
2	Kristall	3	2	0	0	1	17	7	+10	6	Knockout stage
3	Marseille BT	3	1	0	0	2	14	22	−8	3	
4	Nazarenos	3	0	0	0	3	9	17	−8	0	

Source: BSWW

12 July 2021	San Francisco (Spain)	4–3	(Russia) Kristall	Estádio do Viveiro
14:45	C. Carballo 2'; Makarov 6' (o.g.); J. Torres 18'; Frutos 25'	Report	1' (o.g.) C. Carballo; 24', 35' Rodrigo	Referee: Sergio Soares (Portugal)

12 July 2021	Nazarenos (Portugal)	6–7	(France) Marseille BT	Pitch 2
17:15		Report		Referee: Csaba Baghy (Hungary)

13 July 2021	Kristall (Russia)	7–0	(Portugal) Nazarenos	Estádio do Viveiro
14:45	Remizov 9'; Zharikov 11', 12', 35'; Makarov 20'; Mauricinho 29'; Rodrigo 35'	Report		Referee: Tomasz Winiarczyk (Poland)

13 July 2021	Marseille BT (France)	4–9	(Spain) San Francisco	Pitch 4
17:15		Report		Referee: Wilson Soares (Portugal)

14 July 2021	Kristall (Russia)	7–3	(France) Marseille BT	Estádio do Viveiro
14:45		Report		Referee: Antonio Almeida (Portugal)

14 July 2021	Nazarenos (Portugal)	3–3 (a.e.t.) (1–4 p)	(Spain) San Francisco	Pitch 2
18:45		Report		Referee: Csaba Baghy (Hungary)

=== Group C ===
Pos	Team	Pld	W	W+	WP	L	GF	GA	GD	Pts	Qualification
1	Kfar Qassem	3	3	0	0	0	20	11	+9	9	Knockout stage
2	Sporting CP	3	2	0	0	1	12	9	+3	6	Knockout stage
3	Varzim	3	1	0	0	2	11	11	0	3	Knockout stage
4	La Louvière	3	0	0	0	3	7	19	−12	0	

Source: BSWW

12 July 2021	Varzim (Portugal)	2–7	(Israel) Kfar Qassem	Pitch 4
18:45	Renan 12'; Luca 25'	Report	2', 33' Eudin; 7' Camilo Augusto; 12' Nelito Jr. 21', 22' Yatim; 34' Omry	Referee: Mehdi Sayoud (Belgium)

12 July 2021	La Louvière (Belgium)	1–5	(Portugal) Sporting CP	Estádio do Viveiro
18:45	Buscema 19'	Report	4', 36', 36' Belchior; 17' Von; 34' P. Marques	Referee: Vladimir Tashkov (Bulgaria)

13 July 2021	Kfar Qassem (Israel)	7–5	(Belgium) La Louvière	Pitch 4
14:45		Report		Referee: Wilson Soares (Portugal)

13 July 2021	Sporting CP (Portugal)	3–2	(Portugal) Varzim	Estádio do Viveiro
18:45	P. Marques 8', 27'; Von 22'	Report	22' TL Sheik; 32' P.H.	Referee: Antonio Almeida (Portugal)

14 July 2021	Varzim (Portugal)	7–1	(Belgium) La Louvière	Pitch 2
16:00		Report		Referee: Vasileios Fitsas (Greece)

14 July 2021	Sporting CP (Portugal)	4–6	(Israel) Kfar Qassem	Estádio do Viveiro
18:45	P. Marques 4'; Mota 7'; Belchior 15'; Von 24'	Report	6' Camilo Augusto; 7' Nelito Jr. 19', 27', 31' Eudin; 31' Yatim	Referee: Luca Romani (Italy)

=== Group D ===
Pos	Team	Pld	W	W+	WP	L	GF	GA	GD	Pts	Qualification
1	Lokomotiv Moscow	3	3	0	0	0	18	6	+12	9	Knockout stage
2	Molniya	3	2	0	0	1	19	9	+10	6	Knockout stage
3	Marseille Minots	3	0	1	0	2	10	20	−10	2	
4	Caxinas	3	0	0	0	3	3	15	−12	0	

Source: BSWW

12 July 2021	Marseille Minots (France)	2–6	(Russia) Lokomotiv Moscow	Estádio do Viveiro
12:00	Talbi 10'; Guemdane 26'	Report	7', 28' Nikonorov; 12' Zemsekov; 19' Voloshin; 25' Thanger; 32' Peletckii	Referee: Wilson Soares (Portugal)

12 July 2021	Caxinas (Portugal)	0–4	(Ukraine) Molniya	Pitch 2
14:45		Report	13' Piatrouski; 26' Budzko; 27', 29' Dubovyk	Referee: Vasileios Fitsas (Greece)

13 July 2021	Lokomotiv Moscow (Russia)	8–1	(Portugal) Caxinas	Pitch 4
13:30		Report		Referee: Malte Gerhardt (Germany)

13 July 2021	Molniya (Ukraine)	12–5	(France) Marseille Minots	Pitch 4
16:00		Report		Referee: Filipe Almeida (Portugal)

14 July 2021	Lokomotiv Moscow (Russia)	4–3	(Ukraine) Molniya	Estádio do Viveiro
12:00	Jordan 13'; Nikonorov 28'; Benjamin Jr. 31', 35'	Report	5' Rarot; 13' Shchytnik; 27' Dubovyk	Referee: Luca Romani (Italy)

14 July 2021	Caxinas (Portugal)	2–3 (a.e.t.)	(France) Marseille Minots	Pitch 2
14:45	Luciano 2'; Pedro Braga 26'	Report	3' Dhaoudi; 19' Basquaise; 37' Talbi	Referee: Jurijs Ivusins (Latvia)

=== Group E ===
Pos	Team	Pld	W	W+	WP	L	GF	GA	GD	Pts	Qualification
1	Krylya Sovetov	3	3	0	0	0	12	6	+6	9	Knockout stage
2	Levante	3	2	0	0	1	18	7	+11	6	Knockout stage
3	Newteam Brainois	3	1	0	0	2	9	19	−10	3	
4	Chaves	3	0	0	0	3	7	14	−7	0	

Source: BSWW

12 July 2021	Newteam Brainois (Belgium)	2–11	(Spain) Levante	Pitch 2
10:45	Casellas 1'; Mathon 27'	Report	1', 27' Dmais; 1', 19' Edu Suárez; 1' Arias; 5' Rigaud; 15', 26', 32' Adri López; 15', 32' Salvo	Referee: Luca Romani (Italy)

12 July 2021	Chaves (Portugal)	2–4	(Russia) Krylya Sovetov	Pitch 2
13:30	Ze Henrique 23'; Marcelo Gomes 33'	Report	11' Kartashov; 20' Alex; 34', 36' Kotenev	Referee: Attila Balint (Romania)

13 July 2021	Levante (Spain)	6–2	(Portugal) Chaves	Estádio do Viveiro
12:00	Adri López 10'; Dmais 13', 24'; Antonio 22'; Rigaud 27'; Fernando 32'	Report	27' Carlos; 32'; Rui	Referee: Murat Ergin Gozutok (Turkey)

13 July 2021	Krylya Sovetov (Russia)	5–3	(Belgium) Newteam Brainois	Pitch 4
12:00	Kotenev 1', 1', 8'; Gerlan 12'; Alex 15'	Report	10' Casellas; 22' Debecker; 36' Mansard	Referee: Wilson Soares (Portugal)

14 July 2021	Levante (Spain)	1–3	(Russia) Krylya Sovetov	Pitch 2
10:45	Dmais 33'	Report	16' Savich; 32' Kartashov; 35' Alex	Referee: Vladimir Tashkov (Bulgaria)

14 July 2021	Chaves (Portugal)	3–4	(Belgium) Newteam Brainois	Pitch 2
13:30	Ze Henrique 22', 31'; Marcelo Gomes 33'	Report	1' Casellas; 14', 32' Mathon; 15' Bennett	Referee: Richard de Bruijn-Rodrigo (Netherlands)

=== Group F ===
Pos	Team	Pld	W	W+	WP	L	GF	GA	GD	Pts	Qualification
1	Melistar	3	3	0	0	0	25	8	+17	9	Knockout stage
2	Artur Music	3	2	0	0	1	22	6	+16	6	Knockout stage
3	Buarcos 2017	3	1	0	0	2	18	13	+5	3	Knockout stage
4	Telavi	3	0	0	0	3	10	48	−38	0	

Source: BSWW

12 July 2021	Telavi (Georgia (country))	1–17	(Ukraine) Artur Music	Pitch 2
09:30		Report		Referee: Csaba Baghy (Hungary)

12 July 2021	Buarcos 2017 (Portugal)	3–4	(Spain) Melistar	Pitch 2
12:00		Report		Referee: Tomasz Winiarczyk (Poland)

13 July 2021	Melistar (Spain)	18–3	(Georgia (country)) Telavi	Pitch 4
09:30		Report		Referee: Sergio Soares (Portugal)

13 July 2021	Artur Music (Ukraine)	3–2	(Portugal) Buarcos 2017	Pitch 4
10:45	A. Borsuk 2', 34'; Butko 3'	Report	17' Iguinho; 18' Ryan	Referee: Luca Romani (Italy)

14 July 2021	Artur Music (Ukraine)	2–3	(Spain) Melistar	Estádio do Viveiro
09:30	Butko 24'; Hodel 28'	Report	25' D. Ardil; 31' Raphael; 36' Oliver	Referee: Wilson Soares (Portugal)

14 July 2021	Buarcos 2017 (Portugal)	13–6	(Georgia (country)) Telavi	Pitch 3
09:30		Report		Referee: Emmanuel Vocale (Belgium)

=== Group G ===
Pos	Team	Pld	W	W+	WP	L	GF	GA	GD	Pts	Qualification
1	Delta Saratov	3	3	0	0	0	22	4	+18	9	Knockout stage
2	Real Münster	3	2	0	0	1	17	11	+6	6	Knockout stage
3	San Javier	3	1	0	0	2	9	14	−5	3	
4	Vila Flor	3	0	0	0	3	5	24	−19	0	

Source: BSWW

12 July 2021	Vila Flor (Portugal)	2–8	(Germany) Real Münster	Pitch 2
16:00		Report		Referee: Murat Ergin Gozutok (Turkey)

12 July 2021	Delta Saratov (Russia)	5–1	(Spain) San Javier	Pitch 4
16:00	Andreev 14', 33'; Paulinho 22'; Pankratov 22'; Rafinha 24'	Report	22' Batis	Referee: Antonio Almeida (Portugal)

13 July 2021	Real Münster (Germany)	6–2	(Spain) San Javier	Pitch 2
16:00		Report		Referee: Richard de Bruijn-Rodrigo (Netherlands)

13 July 2021	Delta Saratov (Russia)	10–0	(Portugal) Vila Flor	Pitch 2
17:15	Pankratov 4', 27'; Kryshanov 7', 30'; Andreev 10'; Raskin 12', 12'; Rafinha 18'; Paulinho 28'; Teterin 34'	Report		Referee: Alfredo Pavone (Italy)

14 July 2021	Real Münster (Germany)	3–7	(Russia) Delta Saratov	Estádio do Viveiro
08:15		Report		Referee: Sergio Soares (Portugal)

14 July 2021	San Javier (Spain)	6–3	(Portugal) Vila Flor	Pitch 2
09:30		Report		Referee: Csaba Baghy (Hungary)

=== Group H ===
Pos	Team	Pld	W	W+	WP	L	GF	GA	GD	Pts	Qualification
1	GRAP	3	2	0	1	0	20	14	+6	7	Knockout stage
2	Rosh HaAyin	3	2	0	0	1	23	16	+7	6	Knockout stage
3	Viareggio	3	1	0	0	2	20	20	0	3	Knockout stage
4	Nacional	3	0	0	0	3	11	24	−13	0	

Source: BSWW

12 July 2021	Nacional (Portugal)	3–6	(Portugal) GRAP	Pitch 4
14:45	Christian 5'; Eugénio 12'; João 18'	Report	8', 23' Diogo; 17' (o.g.) André; 26', 27' Bernardo; 35' Luca	Referee: Francisco Costa (Portugal)

12 July 2021	Rosh HaAyin (Israel)	8–6	(Italy) Viareggio	Pitch 4
17:15	Edson Hulk 4', 8', 16', 36'; Danin 8'; O. Eiloz 18', 19'; Brendo 31'	Report	9' Ott; 12', 31', 32' Stanković; 15', 21' Remedi	Referee: Francisco Costa (Portugal)

13 July 2021	Viareggio (Italy)	6–1	(Portugal) Nacional	Estádio do Viveiro
09:30	Stanković 4', 9'; Genovali 5'; Ott 25', 28'; Minichino 31'	Report	35' Gonçalo	Referee: Attila Balint (Romania)

13 July 2021	GRAP (Portugal)	3–3 (a.e.t.) (4–3 p)	(Israel) Rosh HaAyin	Pitch 2
18:45	Bernardo 14'; Diogo 16', 31'	Report	10', 22' Edson Hulk; 20' Brendo	Referee: Jurijs Ivusins (Latvia)
	Penalties
	Miguel (penalty scored); Luca (penalty missed); Vasco (penalty scored); Diogo (penalty scored); Bernardo (penalty scored)		(penalty scored) Edson Hulk; (penalty scored) Brendo; (penalty missed) Alejandro; (penalty missed) Danin; (penalty scored) O. Eiloz

14 July 2021	Viareggio (Italy)	8–11	(Portugal) GRAP	Pitch 4
17:15		Report		Referee: Murat Ergin Gozutok (Turkey)

14 July 2021	Nacional (Portugal)	7–12	(Israel) Rosh HaAyin	Pitch 4
18:45	João 19', 23'; Christian 25'; Gonçalo 33'; Jasmins 34'	Report	2' Alejandro; 4', 10', 19', 26' Brendo; 9', 21', 29' Edson Hulk; 11', 22' Eliran; 34' Iluz	Referee: Malte Gerhardt (Germany)

=== Group I ===
Pos	Team	Pld	W	W+	WP	L	GF	GA	GD	Pts	Qualification
1	Nistru Chișinău	3	2	1	0	0	12	6	+6	8	Knockout stage
2	Rostocker Robben	3	1	1	0	1	15	9	+6	5	Knockout stage
3	Newteam Brussels	3	1	0	0	2	9	11	−2	3	Knockout stage
4	Bemannia Stockholm	3	0	0	0	3	8	18	−10	0	

Source: BSWW

12 July 2021	Nistru Chișinău (Moldova)	4–1	(Belgium) Newteam Brussels	Pitch 4
10:45	Hapon 7'; Negara 17'; Graur 31'; Gurjui 33'	Report	13' Ennya	Referee: Francisco Costa (Portugal)

12 July 2021	Bemannia Stockholm (Sweden)	2–9	(Germany) Rostocker Robben	Pitch 4
13:30	Gustafsson 14', 20'	Report	7', 11', 28' Körner; 11' Meier; 22', 32' Knüppel; 24' Basiel; 27' Kautermann; 35' Skeip	Referee: Francisco Bumedien (Spain)

13 July 2021	Newteam Brussels (Belgium)	4–2	(Sweden) Bemannia Stockholm	Estádio do Viveiro
08:15	La Grange 7'; Groyne 10'; Mokere 13'; Jamotte 28'	Report	17' Gustafsson; 24' Kettler	Referee: Antonio Almeida (Portugal)

13 July 2021	Rostocker Robben (Germany)	1–3	(Moldova) Nistru Chișinău	Pitch 2
13:30	Körner 4'	Report	6' Ignat; 13' Chaikouski; 20' Hapon	Referee: Mehdi Sayoud (Belgium)

14 July 2021	Newteam Brussels (Belgium)	4–5 (a.e.t.)	(Germany) Rostocker Robben	Pitch 4
14:45		Report		Referee: Francisco Costa (Portugal)

14 July 2021	Bemannia Stockholm (Sweden)	4–5 (a.e.t.)	(Moldova) Nistru Chișinău	Pitch 4
16:00		Report		Referee: Georgios Fitsas (Greece)

=== Group J ===
Pos	Team	Pld	W	W+	WP	L	GF	GA	GD	Pts	Qualification
1	CB Caldas Rainha	3	2	0	0	1	7	3	+4	6	Knockout stage
2	Napoli Patron	3	2	0	0	1	9	8	+1	6	Knockout stage
3	Bohemians 1905	3	2	0	0	1	7	8	−1	6	Knockout stage
4	Sesimbra	3	0	0	0	3	4	8	−4	0	

Source: BSWW

12 July 2021	Bohemians 1905 (Czech Republic)	4–2	(Greece) Napoli Patron	Estádio do Viveiro
09:30	Salák 6', 33'; Hustý 32'; Radosta 29'	Report	20' Torres; 29' Calmon	Referee: Sergio Soares (Portugal)

12 July 2021	CB Caldas Rainha (Portugal)	1–0	(Portugal) Sesimbra	Pitch 4
12:00	Liborio 8'	Report		Referee: Antonio Almeida (Portugal)

13 July 2021	Napoli Patron (Greece)	3–1	(Portugal) CB Caldas Rainha	Pitch 2
12:00	Calmon 7', 24'; Nazarov 14'	Report	14' Silvio	Referee: Vladimir Tashkov (Bulgaria)

13 July 2021	Sesimbra (Portugal)	1–3	(Czech Republic) Bohemians 1905	Pitch 2
14:45	Rào 23'	Report	10' Radosta; 27' Boček; 32' Vyhnal	Referee: Pierre Bonnici (Malta)

14 July 2021	Napoli Patron (Greece)	4–3	(Portugal) Sesimbra	Pitch 4
12:00	Torres 5'; Sofoulis 9'; Tomás 25' (o.g.); Calmon 34'	Report	6' Bernardo; 9' Pereira; 15' Rodrigo	Referee: Malte Gerhardt (Germany)

14 July 2021	CB Caldas Rainha (Portugal)	5–0	(Czech Republic) Bohemians 1905	Pitch 4
13:30	Liborio 5', 20', 36'; Loja 26'; Garcia 31'	Report		Referee: Tomasz Winiarczyk (Poland)

=== Group K ===
Pos	Team	Pld	W	W+	WP	L	GF	GA	GD	Pts	Qualification
1	CB Loures	2	2	0	0	0	28	6	+22	6	Knockout stage
2	La Grande-Motte Pyramide	2	1	0	0	1	11	7	+4	3	Knockout stage
3	Porto Mendo	2	0	0	0	2	4	30	−26	0	

Source: BSWW

12 July 2021	Porto Mendo (Portugal)	1–8	(France) La Grande-Motte Pyramide	Estádio do Viveiro
08:15		Report		Referee: Vladimir Tashkov (Bulgaria)

13 July 2021	CB Loures (Portugal)	22–3	(Portugal) Porto Mendo	Pitch 2
10:45		Report		Referee: Alfredo Pavone (Italy)

14 July 2021	La Grande-Motte Pyramide (France)	3–6	(Portugal) CB Loures	Pitch 4
10:45		Report		Referee: Murat Ergin Gozutok (Turkey)

=== Group L ===
Pos	Team	Pld	W	W+	WP	L	GF	GA	GD	Pts	Qualification
1	Braga	3	3	0	0	0	23	2	+21	9	Knockout stage
2	Servit	3	2	0	0	1	19	10	+9	6	Knockout stage
3	Torrejón	3	1	0	0	2	5	24	−19	3	
4	Copenhagen	3	0	0	0	3	8	19	−11	0	

Source: BSWW

12 July 2021	Servit (Ukraine)	6–5	(Denmark) Copenhagen	Pitch 3
09:30		Report		Referee: Jurijs Ivusins (Latvia)

12 July 2021	Torrejón (Spain)	1–9	(Portugal) Braga	Estádio do Viveiro
17:15	Riduan 28'	Report	9', 14' Filipe da Silva; 11', 32' Leo Martins; 19', 22', 29' Lucão; 26' Fábio Costa; 31' Rafa Padilha	Referee: Raffaele Delvecchio (Italy)

13 July 2021	Copenhagen (Denmark)	3–4	(Spain) Torrejón	Pitch 2
09:30		Report		Referee: Jurijs Ivusins (Latvia)

13 July 2021	Braga (Portugal)	5–1	(Ukraine) Servit	Estádio do Viveiro
17:15	Bê Martins 3'; Fábio Costa 21'; Lucão 28'; Filipe da Silva 29'; Pedro Mano 31'	Report	25' Voitenko	Referee: Emmanuel Vocale (Belgium)

14 July 2021	Torrejón (Spain)	0–12	(Ukraine) Servit	Pitch 4
09:30		Report		Referee: Francisco Costa (Portugal)

14 July 2021	Copenhagen (Denmark)	0–9	(Portugal) Braga	Estádio do Viveiro
17:15		Report	4' Bê Martins; 5' Hugo F. 9', 13', 21' Filipe da Silva; 12' André Nunes; 15', 22' Lucão; 27' André	Referee: Alfredo Pavone (Italy)

=== Group M ===
Pos	Team	Pld	W	W+	WP	L	GF	GA	GD	Pts	Qualification
1	Spartak Varna	2	2	0	0	0	11	6	+5	6	Knockout stage
2	Dinamo Batumi	2	1	0	0	1	6	6	0	3	Knockout stage
3	ACD O Sótão Norte	2	0	0	0	2	4	9	−5	0	Knockout stage

Source: BSWW

12 July 2021	Dinamo Batumi (Georgia (country))	3–1	(Portugal) ACD O Sótão Norte	Pitch 2
18:45	Shamiladze 2', 16'; Leo 22'	Report	33' Léo Mendes	Referee: Luca Romani (Italy)

13 July 2021	Spartak Varna (Bulgaria)	6–3	(Portugal) ACD O Sótão Norte	Pitch 4
18:45	Maci 9', 35', 36'; Ivanov 15', 25'; Todorov 26'	Report	25' Tiago Légua; 31' Batista; 34' Daniel Piló	Referee: Murat Ergin Gozutok (Turkey)

14 July 2021	Dinamo Batumi (Georgia (country))	3–5	(Bulgaria) Spartak Varna	Pitch 2
12:00	Tossi 14' (pen.); Todadze 26', 36'	Report	16' Adamov; 21', 31' Djambazov; 26' Tsvetkov; 28' (o.g.) Ivaniadze	Referee: Attila Balint (Romania)

=== Ranking of third-placed teams ===
Since Groups K and M consisted of three teams, for the third placed teams from Groups A–J and L, their results against the teams finishing in fourth place in their groups were discounted for this ranking.

Pos	Grp	Team	Pld	W	W+	WP	L	GF	GA	GD	Pts	Qualification
1	J	(Czech Republic) Bohemians 1905	2	1	0	0	1	4	7	−3	3	Knockout stage
2	F	(Portugal) Buarcos 2017	2	0	0	0	2	5	7	−2	0	Knockout stage
3	I	(Belgium) Newteam Brussels	2	0	0	0	2	5	9	−4	0	Knockout stage
4	H	(Italy) Viareggio	2	0	0	0	2	14	19	−5	0	Knockout stage
5	M	(Portugal) ACD O Sótão Norte	2	0	0	0	2	4	9	−5	0	Knockout stage
6	C	(Portugal) Varzim	2	0	0	0	2	4	10	−6	0	Knockout stage
7	G	(Spain) San Javier	2	0	0	0	2	3	11	−8	0	
8	A	(Portugal) Belenenses	2	0	0	0	2	2	10	−8	0	
9	B	(France) Marseille BT	2	0	0	0	2	7	16	−9	0	
10	D	(France) Marseille Minots	2	0	0	0	2	7	18	−11	0	
11	E	(Belgium) Newteam Brainois	2	0	0	0	2	5	16	−11	0	
12	L	(Spain) Torrejón	2	0	0	0	2	1	22	−21	0	
13	K	(Portugal) Porto Mendo	2	0	0	0	2	4	30	−26	0	

Source: BSWW

== Knockout stage ==
=== Bracket (last 16 onwards) ===
Ninth place
Delta Saratov	9
Kfar Qassem	4
Eleventh place
Artur Music	3
GRAP	2
Thirteenth place
Nistru Chișinău	6
GM Pyramide	2
Fifteenth place
CB Loures	5
CB C. Rainha	2

Consolation semifinals
Delta Saratov	5
Artur Music	4
Kfar Qassem	5
GRAP	4
13th–16th classification
Nistru Chișinău	3
CB Loures	2
GM Pyramide	7
CB C. Rainha	0

Consolation quarterfinals
Delta Saratov	7
Nistru Chișinău	4
CB Loures	3
Artur Music	4
GM Pyramide	9 (3)
Kfar Qassem (p)	9 (4)
GRAP	5
CB C. Rainha	4

Round of 16
Delta Saratov	2
Real Münster	6
ACD O Sótão	5
Nistru Chișinău	4
CB Loures	0
Kristall	1
Lokomotiv	6
Artur Music	1
San Francisco	5
GM Pyramide	2
Kfar Qassem	2
Krylya Sovetov	5
Braga	12
GRAP	7
Spartak Varna	5
CB C. Rainha	1

Quarterfinals
Real Münster	1
ACD O Sótão	0
Kristall	5
Lokomotiv	1
San Francisco	5
Krylya Sovetov	4
Braga	6
Spartak Varna	4

Semifinals
Real Münster	2
Kristall	5
San Francisco	4
Braga	7
5th–8th classification
ACD O Sótão	2
Lokomotiv	6
Krylya Sovetov	7
Spartak Varna	4

Final
Kristall	6
Braga	3
Third place
Real Münster	4
San Francisco	7
Fifth place
Lokomotiv	4
Krylya Sovetov	3
Seventh place
ACD O Sótão (p)	2(4)
Spartak Varna	2(2)

=== Round of 32 ===
==== Draw ====
The draw to determine the round of 32 ties and composition of the knockout stage bracket took place on 14 July after the conclusion of all group stage matches.

The 32 clubs were split into four pots of eight based on their group stage performance, with the best performing clubs placed in Pot 1 down to the worst performing octet in Pot 4. Teams from Pot 1 were drawn against teams from Pot 4; teams from Pot 2 were drawn against teams from Pot 3. The drawing of ties alternated as such and were allocated to the bracket from top to bottom in the order they were drawn.

Pot 1	Pot 2	Pot 3	Pot 4
(Portugal) CB Loures; (Portugal) Braga; (Portugal) ACD O Sótão; (Russia) Delta Saratov; (Israel) Kfar Qassem; (Spain) San Francisco; (Bulgaria) Spartak Varna; (Russia) Lokomotiv Moscow	(Spain) Melistar; (Portugal) CB Caldas Rainha; (Russia) Krylya Sovetov; (Moldova) Nistru Chișinău; (Portugal) GRAP; (Spain) Levante; (France) La Grande-Motte Pyramide; (Russia) Kristall	(Sweden) Norsjö; (Portugal) Sporting CP; (Ukraine) Artur Music; (Germany) Real Münster; (Israel) Rosh HaAyin; (Greece) Napoli Patron; (Ukraine) Servit; (Georgia (country)) Dinamo Batumi	(Ukraine) Molniya; (Germany) Rostocker Robben; (Czech Republic) Bohemians 1905; (Portugal) Buarcos 2017; (Belgium) Newteam Brussels; (Italy) Viareggio; (Portugal) ACD O Sótão Norte; (Portugal) Varzim

==== Matches ====
15 July 2021
09:30

Melistar	4–5 (a.e.t.)	Artur Music
D. Ardil 3'; Mario 5'; Ze Lucas 20'; Ale 28'	Report	4' Hodel; 18', 21' Josep Jr. 20', 37' Pachev

Estádio do Viveiro
Referee: Sergio Soares (Portugal)
15 July 2021
09:30

Delta Saratov	4–1	Viareggio
Pankratov 17'; Bokach 18'; Kryshanov 31'; Paulinho 36'	Report	31' Ott

Pitch 2
Referee: Vladimir Tashkov (Bulgaria)
15 July 2021
09:30

Levante	4–6 (a.e.t.)	Real Münster
Arias 1'; Adri López 13'; Edu Suárez 26'; Salvo 26'	Report	1' Marcel; 10' Jose Carlos; 13', 15' Digo; 37' Anatoliy; 38' Joscha

Pitch 4
Referee: Francisco Costa (Portugal)
15 July 2021
10:45

Kristall	7–2	Servit
Romanov 9'; Paporotnyi 10'; Rodrigo 22', 25'; Zharikov 25'; Shishin 29'; Datinha 32'	Report	11', 30' Pashko

Estádio do Viveiro
Referee: Jurijs Ivusins (Latvia)
15 July 2021
10:45

Nistru Chișinău	4–0	Napoli Patron
Chaikouski 7', 14'; Ignat 17'; Gurjui 32'	Report

Pitch 2
Referee: Tomasz Winiarczyk (Poland)
15 July 2021
10:45

CB Loures	4–1	Rostocker Robben
Seixas 11'; Miguel P. 20', 29'; Chiky Ardil 36'	Report	25' Körner

Pitch 4
Referee: Pierre Bonnici (Malta)
15 July 2021
12:00

Braga	8–3	Varzim
Lucão 8', 18'; Filipe da Silva 11'; André 16'; Bê Martins 19', 33'; Léo Martins 27', 32'	Report	3' TL Sheik; 29', 36' Renan

Estádio do Viveiro
Referee: Wilson Soares (Portugal)
15 July 2021
12:00

Lokomotiv Moscow	11–1	Bohemians 1905
Mamadiev 2', 15'; Zemskov 3', 14'; Kosharnyi 7', 35'; Nikonorov 15', 22'; Vinogradov 23'; Parkhomenko 29'; Samoha 31'	Report	24' (o.g.) Novikov

Pitch 2
Referee: Emmanuel Vocale (Belgium)
15 July 2021
12:00

San Francisco	4–2	Buarcos 2017
Frutos 10'; C. Carballo 13'; Pablo Perez 21'; Cristian T. 23'	Report	16' Bôbo; 31' Betinho

Pitch 4
Referee: Murat Ergin Gozutok (Turkey)
15 July 2021
13:30

GRAP	5–4	Sporting CP
Diogo 10', 33'; Bernardo 17', 20'; Sergio 34'	Report	2' P. Marques; 8' Dias; 17' Von; 20' Mota

Estádio do Viveiro
Referee: Antonio Almeida (Portugal)
15 July 2021
13:30

La Grande-Motte Pyramide	7–2	Dinamo Batumi
Barbotti 1', 14'; Belhomme 7', 24'; Angeletti 7'; Fort 20'; Grandon 22'	Report	8' Makharadze; 20' Leo

Pitch 2
Referee: Attila Balint (Romania)
15 July 2021
13:30

Kfar Qassem	7–5	Molniya
Jbaren 4'; Camilo Augusto 5', 7'; Nelito Jr. 19'; Gean 27'; Eudin 27', 31'	Report	5' Rarot; 8' Kanstantsinau; 9' Dubovyk; 12', 27' Budzko

Pitch 4
Referee: Alfredo Pavone (Italy)
15 July 2021
14:45

Krylya Sovetov	6–6 (a.e.t.)	Rosh HaAyin
Kotenev 1', 3', 29'; Alex 20'; Fedorov 32'; Kartashov 35'	Report	1', 10', 15', 28', 29', 29' Edson Hulk
Penalties
Alex (penalty scored); Kartashov (penalty scored); Kotenev (penalty scored); Fedorov (penalty missed); Savich (penalty scored); Gerlan (penalty scored); Edinho (penalty scored); Shkarin (penalty scored); Turzanov (penalty scored)	8–7	(penalty scored) Edson Hulk; (penalty scored) Brendo; (penalty scored) Kalfa; (penalty missed) Shemesh; (penalty scored) Or Eiloz; (penalty scored) Daniel; (penalty scored) Asmara; (penalty scored) Taras; (penalty missed) Teleco

Pitch 2
Referee: Fiammetta Susanna (Italy)
15 July 2021
14:45

CB Caldas Rainha	5–3	Norsjö
Liborio 13', 18', 25'; Pinto 15'; Loja 24'	Report	3', 21' Signarsson; 9' Wiklund

Pitch 4
Referee: Mehdi Sayoud (Belgium)
15 July 2021
16:00

ACD O Sótão	5–3	Newteam Brussels
Fabinho 8'; Duarte Vivo 11'; Novikau 20', 36'; Eustáquio 32'	Report	6' L. Brichart; 17', 19' Depotbeker

Estádio do Viveiro
Referee: Malte Gerhardt (Germany)
15 July 2021
16:00

Spartak Varna	8–4	ACD O Sótão Norte
Rachev 9', 14'; Măci 13', 20', 35'; Martinov 17'; Tsvetkov 21', 36'	Report	24' Léo Mendes; 19', 21' Guga; 28' Léo Anastácio

Pitch 4
Referee: Murat Gozutok (Turkey)

=== Round of 16 ===
16 July 2021
08:00

CB Loures	0–1	Kristall
	Report	11' Mauricinho

Estádio do Viveiro
Referee: Alfredo Pavone (Italy)
16 July 2021
08:00

Lokomotiv Moscow	6–1	Artur Music
Nikonorov 6', 18'; Jordan Oliveira 6'; Benjamin Jr. 10'; Zemskov 25'; Thanger 35'	Report	11' Krokhmaliuk

Pitch 2
Referee: Antonio Pereira (Portugal)
16 July 2021
08:00

San Francisco	5–2	La Grande-Motte Pyramide
Pedro 4', 36'; Javi Torres 7'; Adri Frutos 9'; C. Carballo 10'	Report	16' Angeletti; 21' Belhomme

Pitch 3
Referee: Francisco Costa (Portugal)
16 July 2021
08:00

Kfar Qassem	2–5	Krylya Sovetov
Jbaren 34'; A. Yatim 35'	Report	2' Gerlan; 10', 25' Savich; 16' Kotenev; 36' Turzanov

Pitch 4
Referee: Vladimir Tashkov (Bulgaria)
16 July 2021
09:15

Braga	12–7	GRAP
Lucão 1', 28', 31'; Vasco 11' (o.g.); Léo Martins 4', 24'; Fábio Costa 6', 35'; Hugo F. 11'; Bê Martins 19'; Filipe da Silva 31'; Rúben 32'	Report	12', 13', 28' Diogo; 20', 30' Vasco; 24' Bernardo; 34' Luca

Estádio do Viveiro
Referee: Sergio Gomes (Portugal)
16 July 2021
09:15

Spartak Varna	5–1	CB Caldas Rainha
Tsvetkov 12', 34'; Măci 15'; Djambazov 27'; Martinov 32'	Report	28' Liborio

Pitch 2
Referee: Attila Balint (Romania)
16 July 2021
09:15

ACD O Sótão	5–4	Nistru Chișinău
Robalo 8'; Hardzetski 13'; Samuel Mendes 27'; Duarte Vivo 32'; Fabinho 33'	Report	15' Negara; 34', 34' Hapon; 34' Chaikouski

Pitch 3
Referee: Jurijs Ivusins (Latvia)
16 July 2021
09:15

Delta Saratov	2–6	Real Münster
Pankratov 19'; Paulinho 23'	Report	7' Anton; 11' Jonas; 13', 36' Joscha; 21' Haro; 31' Marcel

Pitch 4
Referee: Luca Romani (Italy)

=== Quarter-finals ===
==== 9th–16th place ====
16 July 2021
17:15

CB Loures	3–4	Artur Music
André P. 9', 13'; Chiky 12'	Report	9' Hodel; 12' Pachev; 34' Borsuk; 36' Panteleichuk

Pitch 2
Referee: Malte Gerhardt (Germany)
16 July 2021
17:15

La Grande-Motte Pyramide	9–9 (a.e.t.)	Kfar Qassem
Grandon 10', 12', 24', 29'; Belhomme 12'; Angeletti 14', 21', 26'; Ibrahim 27'	Report	6' A. Omry; 7', 32' S. Moreb; 12', 28' A. Yatim; 16' (o.g.) Brotini; 23', 32' Eudin; 28' K. Farig
Penalties
Shillingford (penalty scored); Barbotti (penalty scored); Angeletti (penalty scored); Belhomme (penalty missed); Grandon (penalty missed)	3–4	(penalty missed) Gean; (penalty scored) Eudin; (penalty scored) Nelito Jr. (penalty scored) S. Moreb; (penalty scored) A. Yatim

Pitch 3
Referee: Attila Balint (Romania)
16 July 2021
18:45

GRAP	5–4	CB Caldas Rainha
Luca 1'; Rodrigo 9'; Bernardo 12', 34'; Diogo 30'	Report	19' Cota; 24' Liborio; 27', 34' Alves

Pitch 2
Referee: Vasileios Fitsas (Greece)
16 July 2021
18:45

Delta Saratov	7–4	Nistru Chișinău
Rafinha 3'; Teterin 6', 28', 33'; Pankratov 18', 27'; Cojocari 32' (o.g.)	Report	3' Chaikouski; 22' Gurjui; 31', 34' Hapon

Pitch 3
Referee: Fiammetta Susanna (Italy)

==== 1st–8th place ====
16 July 2021
14:45

San Francisco	5–4	Krylya Sovetov
Pablo Perez 4'; Cristian T. 6'; Llorenç 6', 32'; Mounoud 34'	Report	5' Gerlan; 11' Kotenev; 19' Fedorov; 31' Savich

Estádio do Viveiro
Referee: Antonio Pereira (Portugal)
16 July 2021
16:00

Kristall	5–1	Lokomotiv Moscow
Rodrigo 1'; Remizov 22', 28', 36'; Shishin 36'	Report	8' Kosharnyi

Estádio do Viveiro
Referee: Sergio Soares (Portugal)
16 July 2021
17:15

Real Münster	1–0	ACD O Sótão
Joscha 36'	Report

Estádio do Viveiro
Referee: Vladimir Tashkov (Bulgaria)
16 July 2021
18:45

Braga	6–4	Spartak Varna
Rúben 3'; Léo Martins 11'; Lucão 21', 28'; Bê Martins 24'; Fábio Costa 31'	Report	3', 15', 36' Măci; 24' Todorov

Estádio do Viveiro
Referee: Luca Romani (Italy)

=== Semi-finals ===
==== 13th–16th place ====
17 July 2021
08:30

La Grande-Motte Pyramide	7–0	CB Caldas Rainha
Barbotti 1'; Brotini 1'; Belhomme 13', 22', 36'; Grandon 20'; Guerin 34'	Report

Pitch 2
Referee: Malte Gerhardt (Germany)
17 July 2021
09:45

Nistru Chișinău	3–2	CB Loures
Negara 11'; Hapon 18', 36'	Report	15' André P. 19' J. Cabral

Pitch 4
Referee: Vasileios Fitsas (Greece)

==== 9th–12th place ====
17 July 2021
11:15

Delta Saratov	5–4	Artur Music
Kryshanov 7', 17', 26'; Vinogradov 11'; Pankratov 28'	Report	3' Panteleichuk; 7', 30' Borsuk; 8' Illichev

Pitch 2
Referee: Attila Balint (Romania)
17 July 2021
12:30

Kfar Qassem	5–4	GRAP
C. Augusto 5', 23'; A. Yatim 11', 36'; Eudin 26'	Report	4' Vasco; 6' Diogo; 35', 35' Bernardo

Pitch 2
Referee: Fiammetta Susanna (Italy)

==== 5th–8th place ====
17 July 2021
08:30

ACD O Sótão	2–6	Lokomotiv Moscow
Duarte Vivo 18'; Fabinho 36'	Report	6' Kosharnyi; 7', 22' Zemskov; 22' Jordan Oliveira; 26' Benjamin Jr. 35' Mamadiev

Estádio do Viveiro
Referee: Luca Romani (Italy)
17 July 2021
09:45

Krylya Sovetov	7–4	Spartak Varna
Kotenev 21', 22'; Gerlan 24'; Kartashov 33'; Fedorov 33'; Piniaev 34', 36'	Report	26', 34', 36' Măci; 30' Tsvetkov

Pitch 2
Referee: Raffaele Delvecchio (Italy)

==== 1st–4th place ====
17 July 2021
11:15

Kristall	5–2	Real Münster
Datinha 5'; Shishin 8'; Mauricinho 11'; Krash 19'; Zharikov 24'	Report	12' Joscha; 36' Anatoliy

Estádio do Viveiro
Referee: Antonio Almeida (Portugal)
17 July 2021
12:30

San Francisco	4–7	Braga
Kuman 3'; Llorenç 10', 32'; P. Perez 36'	Report	9', 14' Fábio Costa; 5' (o.g.) Llorenç; 8' Filipe da Silva; 14', 24' Bê Martins; 29' Lucão

Estádio do Viveiro
Referee: Csaba Baghy (Hungary)

=== Finals ===
==== 15th place match ====
18 July 2021
08:30

CB Loures	5–2	CB Caldas Rainha
Chiky 8', 23', 23'; André P. 11'; Liborio 21' (o.g.)	Report	7' Sil; 10' Liborio

Pitch 3
Referee: Jurijs Ivusins (Latvia)

==== 13th place match ====
18 July 2021
08:30

Nistru Chișinău	6–2	La Grande-Motte Pyramide
Hapon 10', 29'; Cojocari 14', 27'; Angeletti 15' (o.g.); Ignat 20'	Report	29' Barbotti; 30' Angeletti

Pitch 2
Referee: Vasileios Fitsas (Greece)

==== 11th place match ====
18 July 2021
11:15

Artur Music	3–2	GRAP
Panteleichuk 1'; Borsuk 16'; Zborovskyi 21'	Report	1' Bernardo; 20' Diogo

Pitch 4
Referee: Attila Balint (Romania)

==== 9th place match ====
18 July 2021
09:45

Delta Saratov	9–4	Kfar Qassem
Kryshanov 10'; Bokach 14', 30'; Raskin 16'; Pankratov 22'; Vinogradov 24'; Teterin 27'; Rafinha 36'; Paulinho 36'	Report	7' Nelito Jr. 9' Jbaren; 31' Eudin; 34' A. Omry

Pitch 2
Referee: Richard de Bruijn-Rodrigo (Netherlands)

==== 7th place match ====
18 July 2021
08:30

ACD O Sótão	2–2 (a.e.t.)	Spartak Varna
Duarte Vivo 23'; Novikau 39'	Report	10', 37' Măci
Penalties
Hardzetski (penalty scored); Vidinha (penalty scored); Novikau (penalty missed); Duarte Vivo (penalty scored); F. Mota (penalty scored)	4–2	(penalty missed) Djambazov; (penalty missed) Dimitrov; (penalty scored) Tsvetkov; (penalty scored) Măci

Estádio do Viveiro
Referee: Murat Gozutok (Turkey)

==== 5th place match ====
18 July 2021
12:30

Lokomotiv Moscow	4–3	Krylya Sovetov
Kosharnyi 20'; Thanger 25'; Jordan Oliveira 26'; Nikonorov 35'	Report	15' Piniaev; 18' Fedorov; 36' Gerlan

Pitch 2
Referee: Emmanuel Vocale (Belgium)

==== 3rd place match ====
18 July 2021
09:45

Real Münster	4–7	San Francisco
Digo 2', 35'; Joscha 22'; Adri Frutos 27'	Report	2' Fran Mejias; 14' P. Perez; 16', 20' C. Carballo; 22', 25' Pedro; 28' Pampero

Estádio do Viveiro
Referee: Alfredo Pavone (Italy)

==== Final ====
18 July 2021
14:00

Kristall	6–3	Braga
Mauricinho 13', 13'; Remizov 27'; Paporotnyi 29'; Shishin 31', 36'	Report	14' Rafa Padilha; 17' Léo Martins; 27' Filipe da Silva

Estádio do Viveiro
Referee: Vladimir Tashkov (Bulgaria)

== Awards ==
The following individual awards were presented after the final.

Top scorer(s)
(Portugal) Bernardo Lopes ( (Portugal) GRAP)
18 goals
Best player
(Brazil) Mauricinho ( Kristall)
Best goalkeeper
(Russia) Maxim Chuzhkov ( Kristall)

== Top goalscorers ==
Players with at least seven goals are listed.

18 goals

- (Portugal) Bernardo Lopes ( (Portugal) GRAP)

16 goals

- (Brazil) Edson Hulk ( (Israel) Rosh HaAyin)

15 goals

- (Romania) Marian Măciucă ( (Bulgaria) Spartak Varna)

14 goals

- (Brazil) Lucão ( (Portugal) Braga)

13 goals

- (Brazil) Eudin ( (Israel) Kfar Qassem)

12 goals

- (Belarus) Aleh Hapon ( (Moldova) Nistru Chișinău)
- (Spain) Chiky Ardil ( (Portugal) CB Loures)
- (Russia) Andrei Pankratov ( (Russia) Delta Saratov)
- (Russia) Andrey Kotenev ( (Russia) Krylya Sovetov)

10 goals

- (Portugal) Hugo Liborio ( (Portugal) CB Caldas Rainha)
- (Portugal) Diogo Oliveira ( (Portugal) GRAP)
- (Portugal) Duarte Vivo ( (Portugal) ACD O Sótão)
- (Brazil) Filipe da Silva ( (Portugal) Braga)

9 goals

- (Switzerland) Dejan Stankovic ( (Italy) Viareggio)
- (Russia) Nikolai Kryshanov ( (Russia) Delta Saratov)
- (Belarus) Anatoliy Ryabko ( (Germany) Real Münster)
- (Brazil) Rodrigo ( (Russia) Kristall)

8 goals

- (Senegal) Lansana Diassy ( (France) Marseille BT)
- (France) Stéphane Belhomme ( (France) La Grande-Motte Pyramide)
- (Israel) Amar Yatim ( (Israel) Kfar Qassem)
- (Portugal) Miguel Pintado ( (Portugal) CB Loures)
- (Germany) Joscha Metzler ( (Germany) Real Münster)
- (Russia) Fedor Zemskov ( (Russia) Lokomotiv Moscow)
- (Russia) Boris Nikonorov ( (Russia) Lokomotiv Moscow)
- (Portugal) Bê Martins ( (Portugal) Braga)
- (Portugal) Léo Martins ( (Portugal) Braga)

7 goals

- (Spain) Llorenç Gómez ( (Spain) San Francisco)
- (France) Victor Angeletti ( (France) La Grande-Motte Pyramide)
- (Ukraine) Serhii Dubovyk ( (Ukraine) Molniya)
- (Brazil) Camilo Augusto ( (Israel) Kfar Qassem)
- (Portugal) André Pinto ( (Portugal) CB Loures)
- (Portugal) Fabinho ( (Portugal) ACD O Sótão)
- (Germany) Sven Körner ( (Germany) Rostocker Robben)
- (Brazil) Catarino ( (Germany) Real Münster)
- (Ukraine) Oleg Zborovskyi ( (Ukraine) Artur Music)
- (Ukraine) Roman Pachev ( (Ukraine) Artur Music)

Source: BSWW

== Final standings ==
Rank	Team	Result
1	(Russia) Kristall	Champions (4th title)
2	(Portugal) Braga	Runners-up
3	San Francisco	Third place
4	Real Münster	
5	Lokomotiv Moscow	
6	Krylia Sovetov	
7	ACD O Sotão	
8	Spartak Varna	
9	Delta Saratov	
10	Kfar Qassem	
11	(Ukraine) Artur Music	
12	GRAP	
13	Nistru Chișinău	
14	La Grande-Motte Pyramide	
15	CB Loures	
16	CB Caldas Rainha	

== See also ==
- 2021 Women's Euro Winners Cup
- 2020–21 UEFA Futsal Champions League
