= 2013 Mundialito de Clubes =

III Mundialito de Clubes
Tournament details
- Host country: Brazil
- Dates: 10 – 17 November 2013
- Teams: 8 (from 3 confederations)
- Venue: 1 (in 1 host city)

Final positions
- Champions: (Brazil) Corinthians (1st title)
- Runners-up: (Brazil) Flamengo
- Third place: (Brazil) Vasco da Gama
- Fourth place: (Brazil) Botafogo

Tournament statistics
- Matches played: 16
- Goals scored: 108 (6.75 per match)
- Top scorer: (Brazil) Eudin (Flamengo) (7 goals)
- Best player: (Brazil) Mão (Corinthians)

The third Mundialito de Clubes (Club World Cup in English) is a beach soccer tournament that took place, for the first time, at a temporary stadium at Copacabana Beach in Rio de Janeiro, Brazil from 10 – 17 November 2013. The previous two editions were held at the Praia do Sol stadium at the Arena Guarapiranga sport complex, located near Represa de Guarapiranga, a reservoir located in São Paulo, Brazil.

== Participating teams ==
Eight teams confirmed their participation in this year's tournament, a decrease of four teams who participated in the previous edition:

GROUP A	GROUP B
(United Arab Emirates) Al-Ahli	(Brazil) Corinthians
(Spain) Barcelona	(Brazil) Flamengo
(Brazil) Botafogo	(Italy) Milan
(Brazil) Vasco da Gama	(Uruguay) Peñarol

== Group stage ==
The draw to divide the teams into two groups of four was conducted on 21 October 2013. The official schedule was released on 22 October 2013.

All kickoff times are of local time in Rio de Janeiro (UTC-2).

=== Group A ===
Team	Pld	W	W+	L	GF	GA	+/-	Pts
(Brazil) Botafogo	3	2	0	1	8	6	+2	6
(Brazil) Vasco da Gama	3	1	1	1	10	9	+1	5
(Spain) Barcelona	3	1	0	2	11	12	–1	3
(United Arab Emirates) Al-Ahli	3	1	0	2	7	9	–2	3

Clinched semifinal berth

13 November 2013
13:30

Botafogo (Brazil)	2 – 0	(United Arab Emirates) Al-Ahli
B. Tell 7' (pen.); A. Cavalcanti 17'	Report

Copacabana Beach, Rio de Janeiro

13 November 2013
16:00

Vasco da Gama (Brazil)	4 – 4 (a.e.t.)	(Spain) Barcelona
Bueno 6'; Mauricinho 21'; Jorginho 22'; Boquinha 39'	Report	8' (pen.), 38' D. Stankovic; 19' Nico; 33' O. Moreira
Penalties
Jorginho (penalty missed); Mauricinho (penalty scored)	1 – 0	(penalty missed) D. Stankovic; (penalty missed) R. Amarelle

Copacabana Beach, Rio de Janeiro

14 November 2013
13:30

Al-Ahli (United Arab Emirates)	4 – 6	(Brazil) Vasco da Gama
K. Albalooshi 9'; N. Belchior 14' (pen.), 16' (pen.), 36'	Report	1' Bueno; 7' (pen.), 13' Betinho; 10', 36' Mauricinho; 14' Boquinha

Copacabana Beach, Rio de Janeiro

14 November 2013
14:45

Botafogo (Brazil)	5 – 6	(Spain) Barcelona
Sidney 4'; A. Cavalcanti 15' (pen.); B. Antonio 23'; Vini 29' (pen.); Dmais 35'	Report	2', 23' D. Stankovic; 3' C. Torres; 15', 27' Nico; 24' J. Lima

Copacabana Beach, Rio de Janeiro

15 November 2013
12:30

Barcelona (Spain)	1 – 3	(United Arab Emirates) Al-Ahli
R. Amarelle 36'	Report	28', 36' N. Belchior; 33' H. Alhammadi

Copacabana Beach, Rio de Janeiro

15 November 2013
15:00

Vasco da Gama (Brazil)	0 – 1	(Brazil) Botafogo
	Report	17' Sidney

Copacabana Beach, Rio de Janeiro

=== Group B ===
Team	Pld	W	W+	L	GF	GA	+/-	Pts
(Brazil) Corinthians	3	3	0	0	11	8	+3	9
(Brazil) Flamengo	3	2	0	1	19	10	+9	6
(Uruguay) Peñarol	3	1	0	2	14	19	–5	3
(Italy) Milan	3	0	0	3	11	18	–7	0

Clinched semifinal berth

10 November 2013
10:00

Flamengo (Brazil)	1 – 2	(Brazil) Corinthians
Benjamin 2'	Report	8' André; 9' B. Xavier

Copacabana Beach, Rio de Janeiro

13 November 2013
14:45

Corinthians (Brazil)	4 – 3	(Uruguay) Peñarol
B. Xavier 10'; B. Malias 15', 32'; Anderson 36'	Report	11' M. Diaz; 15' Fred; 23' R. Martinez

Copacabana Beach, Rio de Janeiro

13 November 2013
17:15

Flamengo (Brazil)	7 – 3	(Italy) Milan
Casé 5'; Benjamin 13'; Souza 19', 28', 33'; Digo 19'; Eudin 26'	Report	13' D. Ramacciotti; 20', 28' G. Gori

Copacabana Beach, Rio de Janeiro

14 November 2013
16:00

Peñarol (Uruguay)	5 – 11	(Brazil) Flamengo
R. Villalobos 9' (pen.); M. Cabrera 12'; M. Diaz 29', 30'; Nico 35'	Report	8' Benjamin; 9' Souza; 11' Toinho; 13', 25', 27', 33' Eudin; 24', 34' Datinha; 35', 35' L. Martins

Copacabana Beach, Rio de Janeiro

14 November 2013
17:15

Corinthians (Brazil)	5 – 4	(Italy) Milan
Rafinha 2', 29'; D. Lima 3'; André 10', 13'	Report	14', 15' C. Da Silva; 27', 34' (pen.) G. Gori

Copacabana Beach, Rio de Janeiro

15 November 2013
13:45

Milan (Italy)	4 – 6	(Uruguay) Peñarol
D. Ramacciotti 2'; S. Marinai 15'; G. Gori 17', 34'	Report	9' F. Cabral; 15' M. Diaz; 15', 23' Nico; 24' F. Valarino; 36' R. Martinez

Copacabana Beach, Rio de Janeiro

== Knockout stage ==
Semi-finals
16 November 2013
(Brazil) Corinthians	2
(Brazil) Vasco da Gama	0
16 November 2013
(Brazil) Botafogo	2
(Brazil) Flamengo	3

Final
17 November 2013
(Brazil) Corinthians (a.e.t.)	3 (1)
(Brazil) Flamengo	3 (0)
Third place
17 November 2013
(Brazil) Vasco da Gama	3
(Brazil) Botafogo	1

=== Semifinals ===
16 November 2013
10:30

Corinthians (Brazil)	2 – 0	(Brazil) Vasco da Gama
D. Lima 20'; B. Malias 20'	Report

Copacabana Beach, Rio de Janeiro

16 November 2013
11:45

Botafogo (Brazil)	2 – 3	(Brazil) Flamengo
F. Mazzei 23'; Vini 27'	Report	11' Casé; 12', 25' Datinha

Copacabana Beach, Rio de Janeiro

=== Third place playoff ===
17 November 2013
08:00

Vasco da Gama (Brazil)	3 – 1	(Brazil) Botafogo
Gil 22'; Jorginho 23'; Betinho 28'	Report	20' B. Botelho

Copacabana Beach, Rio de Janeiro

=== Final ===
17 November 2013
10:00

Corinthians (Brazil)	3 – 3 (a.e.t.)	(Brazil) Flamengo
Fernando DDI 9'; André 19'; B. Xavier 23'	Report	9', 28' Eudin; 32' Benjamin
Penalties
B. Xavier (penalty scored)	1 – 0	(penalty missed) Benjamin

Copacabana Beach, Rio de Janeiro

== Winners ==
III Mundialito de Clubes Beach Soccer
Winners:

Corinthians
First title

== Awards ==
Best Player (MVP)
(Brazil) Mão (Corinthians)
Top Scorer
(Brazil) Eudin (Flamengo)
7 goals
Best Goalkeeper
(Brazil) Mão (Corinthians)

== See also ==
- Beach soccer
- Beach Soccer Worldwide
