= FC Barcelona (beach soccer) =

- Full name: FC Barcelona
- Nickname: Barça
- Short name: FCB
- Founded: 2011
- Dissolved: 2017
- Ground: Spotify Camp Nou, Spain
- Capacity: 12,000
- President: Joan Laporta
- Coach: Ramiro Figueiras Amarelle
Home colours	Away colours

FC Barcelona was a beach soccer team founded in 2011 with Ramiro Amarelle, renowned as one of the world's top beach soccer players, appointed as the player-coach in the same year. The team achieved notable success in 2015, winning the fourth edition of the Mundialito de Clubes (Club World Cup) by defeating Vasco da Gama in the final. In the same year, the team secured its first U.S. Open title at the North American Sand Soccer Championships. The club continued its success by winning its second U.S. Opened title in 2017 with a 6-1 victory against GoBeachSoccer (San Diego, CA) at the same championships.

== History ==
=== Early years ===
Founded in 2011, the club made its Mundialito de Clubes debut in the same year. They triumphed in the group stage with three wins and one loss, advancing to the quarterfinals. However, their journey ended there with a loss to Sporting CP. In the 2012 Mundialito de Clubes, the club once again won the group stage, remaining unbeaten. Despite this, they faced another quarterfinal defeat to Sporting CP. The 2013 edition saw Barça finish third in the group stage, securing victory in only one of the three games.

=== 2015 – 2017: Two titles in a year ===
In the 2015 Mundialito de Clubes, Barcelona won the group stage again. Barcelona qualified for the semifinal for the first time in the club's history. In the semifinal, Barca defeated Al-Ahli 3–2 after extra time. In the final, they faced Vasco Da Gama. Vasco took the lead in the early minutes and a few minutes later, they scored their second goal. Datinha then scored a volley to make the score 2–1. Eventually, Vasco scored 2 more goals to make it 4–1. Barca then scored 3 to complete a comeback and send the game to extra time where both clubs only hit the goalposts. Barca went on to win the penalty shootout 3–2, winning the Spanish side their first-ever title. Ozu Moreira claimed the MVP Award for his performance. Barça also competed in the 2015 North American Sand Soccer Championships which they also won.

Since the 2015 Mundialito de Clubes, the team took third at the 2016 North American Sand Soccer Championships and won their second U.S. Open title in three years in 2017. Llorenç Gómez was honored as the Best Beach Soccer Player at the 2018 Beach Soccer Stars event in Dubai, and Ozu Moreira received the same honor in 2021. Both awards were accepted by former club legend, Ramiro Amarelle.

== Squad in 2015 ==
Note: Flags indicate national team as defined under FIFA eligibility rules; some limited exceptions apply. Players may hold more than one non-FIFA nationality.

No.	Pos.	Nation	Player
—	FW	SUI	Dejan Stankovic
—	FW	SRB	Bane
—	DF	ESP	Juanma
—	DF	ESP	Nico
—	FW	ESP	Ramiro Amarelle
—	DF	ESP	Cristian Torres
—	FW	SUI	Phillipp Borer
—	GK	ESP	Dona
—	FW	ESP	Antonio
—	FW	JPN	Ozu Moreira

No.	Pos.	Nation	Player
—	GK	TAH	Jonathan Torohia
—	MF	ESP	Daniel Pajón Gómez
—	DF	ESP	Miguel Beiro
—	GK	ESP	Cristian
—	DF	ITA	Dario Ramacciotti
—	FW	ESP	Llorenç
—	DF	ESP	Raul Merida
—	DF	BRA	Bruno Xavier
—	GK	SLV	José Eliodoro Portillo

Coach: (Spain) Ramiro Amarelle

== Honors ==
=== International competitions ===
- Mundialito de Clubes
  - Winners: 2015
  - Quarter Final: 2012
  - Quarter Final: 2011
- North American Sand Soccer Championships
  - Winners (2): 2015, 2017
  - Third Place: 2016
