= Sporting CP (beach soccer) =

Sporting Clube de Portugal
- Full name: Sporting Clube de Portugal
- Nicknames: Leões (Lions); Verde-e-Brancos (Green'n'Whites)
- Short name: Sporting
- Ground: Praia de Carcavelos, Carcavelos
- Coach: Bilro
- League: Circuito Nacional de Futebol de Praia
- 2010: Circuito Nacional de Futebol de Praia, 1st
Home colours
Away colours
Third colours

Sporting Clube de Portugal has a professional beach soccer team based in Lisbon, Portugal, since 2005 until 2006, and again in 2009, that plays in Portuguese Beach Soccer League.

== Current squad ==
Note: Flags indicate national team as defined under FIFA eligibility rules; some limited exceptions apply. Players may hold more than one non-FIFA nationality.

No.	Pos.	Nation	Player
1	GK	POR	Tiago Petrony
2	DF	POR	Rui Coimbra
3	MF	BRA	Datinha
4	DF	BRA	Diogo Catarino
5	MF	BRA	Bruno Xavier
6	FW	BRA	Nelito Júnior
7	MF	POR	Madjer
8	DF	POR	Marinho
9	FW	POR	Duarte Vivo
10	MF	POR	Ricardinho
11	FW	POR	David Cosmeli

No.	Pos.	Nation	Player
13	MF	POR	Eduardo Farinha
15	MF	POR	Lúcio Carmo
18	GK	BRA	Mão (Jenílson Brito Rodrigues)
22	GK	POR	João Vaz
—	GK	POR	David Pereira
—	DF	POR	Rudy Viana
—	FW	POR	Bernardo Capelo
—	DF	POR	André Cachopo
—	GK	POR	Carlos Pedreiro
—	MF	POR	Mathew Santos
—	FW	BRA	Rodrigo Soares

Coach: (Portugal) Mário Miguel

== Honours ==
=== Domestic Competitions ===
- Campeonato de Futebol de Praia: 3

2010, 2016, 2020
