= Clube de Regatas do Flamengo (beach soccer) =

Brazilian beach soccer team

- Full name: Clube de Regatas do Flamengo
- Short name: Flamengo
- Coach: Rogério Vilela
Home colours
Away colours
Third colours

Clube de Regatas do Flamengo has a professional beach soccer team based in Brazil.

== Mundialito de Clubes 2020 squad ==
Source: Note: Flags indicate national team as defined under FIFA eligibility rules; some limited exceptions apply. Players may hold more than one non-FIFA nationality.

No.	Pos.	Nation	Player
1	GK	BRA	Giovane Silva
2	FW	BRA	Eudin
3	MF	BRA	Thiago Felizardo
5	DF	BRA	Paulo Gil
6	FW	BRA	Paulo Henrique
7	FW	BRA	Alejandro Sales
8	MF	BRA	Galocha

No.	Pos.	Nation	Player
9	FW	BRA	Rodriguinho
10	FW	BRA	Igor
11	FW	BRA	Gustavinho
12	GK	POR	Elinton Andrade
—	FW	UKR	Roman Pachev

Coach: Rogério Vilela

== Honours ==
=== Worldwide ===
- World Winners Cup
  - Champions (1): 2019

=== National ===
- Copa Brasil
  - Champions (1): 2013
- Circuito Brasileiro
  - Champions (1): 2024

=== Inter-State ===
- Torneio Rio-São Paulo
  - Champions (1): 2023
- Copa do Sudeste
  - Champions (1): 2023

=== State ===
- Campeonato Carioca
  - Champions (2): 2019, 2022

=== Friendly tournaments ===
- Montreal International Tournament (1): 2012
- Copa Luz do Mundo (1): 2019

== See also ==
- CR Flamengo
- CR Flamengo (women)
- Flamengo Basketball
- CR Flamengo (Superleague Formula team)
- Flamengo Esports
