= Campeonato de Futebol de Praia =

Football competition in Portugal

- Founded: 2012; 14 years ago
- Country: Portugal
- Confederation: UEFA
- Divisions: Campeonato Elite; Campeonato Nacional
- Number of clubs: 8 (Elite); 26 (National)
- Level on pyramid: 1–2
- Domestic cup: Taça de Portugal Futebol Praia
- International cup(s): Euro Winners Cup; Euro Winners Challenge
- Current champions: Braga
- Most championships: Braga (10 titles)
- Website: Official website

The FPF Campeonato de Futebol de Praia (English: FPF Beach Soccer Championship) is a league competition for beach soccer clubs in Portugal. Organised by the Portuguese Football Federation (FPF) who also established the championship in 2012, it is the country's primary beach soccer club competition. The national league replaced a previous championship run by district associations as Portugal's paramount club tournament.

Held between May and September, the season is divided into two parts: the regular season followed by the post-season, with matches taking place across Portugal. Many of the world's best players compete in the championship.

Currently, the competition consists of two divisions: the Elite Championship, the top tier, disputed by the eight best teams who compete for the title – the winners are crowned league champions – and the National Championship, the second tier, open to all other clubs who compete for two promotion spots to the top division.

The top three teams qualify for the upcoming edition of the Euro Winners Cup (EWC); as of 2020, the league is ranked as the strongest in Europe by Beach Soccer Worldwide (BSWW).

Braga are the most successful club with eight titles and are the current champions.

== Previous national championships ==
The first incarnation of a national championship for Portuguese beach soccer clubs with recognition was originally known as the Liga de Clubes de Futebol de Praia and later the Campeonato Elite de Futebol de Praia, which ran from 2005–2011. However, it was not arranged by the Portuguese Football Federation (FPF); the league was established as a result of cooperation between a number of District Football Associations (that of Viana do Castelo, Braga, Porto, Aveiro, Coimbra, Leiria, Santarém, Lisbon, Setúbal and Algarve).

In 2010, a second national league competition was also established which ran for two seasons, known as the Circuito Nacional de Futebol de Praia; unlike the former, this championship received the "institutional support" of the FPF however was still not organised by them – it was run by an independent event organiser.

Results table
Year	Winners	Runners-up	Ref.	Year	Winners	Runners-up	Ref.
Campeonato Elite de Futebol de Praia				Circuito Nacional de Futebol de Praia			
2005	Porto	Sporting CP		—			
2006	Benfica	Sporting CP		—			
2007	Benfica	União de Leiria		—			
2008	Vitória de Setúbal	União de Leiria		—			
2009	União de Leiria	Rio Ave		—			
2010	Vitória de Setúbal	Porto		2010	Sporting CP	Benfica	
2011	Sporting CP	Vitória de Guimarães		2011	Vitória de Guimarães	Sporting CP	
Note: The 2010 Elite tournament was still considered the primary national event at the time as it took place before the inaugural Circutio season later in 2010; so both are considered national championship results. In 2011, with the Circutio now established, it was viewed as the main national championship, with the 2011 Elite tournament losing its prestige and being seen as simply a warm up event for the upcoming Circutio league season.

During this time, there were calls for the FPF to establish their own, official championship. The FPF ultimately started the Campeonato Nacional de Futebol de Praia as the first official national league (that is to say, run by the country's national association) in 2012, superseding the above two de facto national championships which ceased.

== Format ==
As of 2019; current format introduced in 2015 (with minor revisions since).

=== Overview ===
The championship consists of two championships/divisions; clubs can move between the divisions through a system of promotion and relegation:

1. Campeonato Elite (Elite Championship): the top tier, containing the eight best clubs. The teams in this division aim to win the title and avoid relegation.
2. Campeonato Nacional (National Championship): the lower tier, containing all other clubs of lesser quality that choose to enter the competition that season (26 teams in 2019), split into three geographical conferences (north, central and south zones) with approximately ten clubs in each. The teams in this division aim to be promoted to the Elite Championship.

Both championships are played in two phases; a regular season (May through August) and a post-season (August/September).

=== Elite Championship ===
- Regular season: The clubs play each other once (playing a total of seven matches each) over the course of seven match-days. On each match-day, the fixtures are held in one neutral location in which all eight clubs gather to contest their scheduled matches. This location changes each match-day. Points are earned for the championship table by winning matches.

At the end of the regular season, the top four teams, those occupying positions 1–4 in the table with the most points, advance to the Finals. The bottom four teams, those occupying positions 5–8 in the table with the least points, proceed to the relegation play-offs.

- Post-season: All eight clubs gather in one location for three consecutive days to compete in the post-season phase.

Finals: The four clubs play each other in a round robin format (playing a total of three matches each). The club with the most points at the completion of all fixtures are crowned league champions.
Relegation play-offs: The four clubs play each other in a round robin format (playing a total of three matches each). The two clubs with the most points at the completion of all fixtures retain their place in the Elite Championship for next season. The two clubs with the least points at the completion of all fixtures will be relegated to the National Championship for next season.

=== National Championship ===
- Regular season: The clubs play exclusively against the other members of their own conference, once (playing a total of nine matches each), over the course of nine match-days. On each match-day, the fixtures are held in three locations; one in the north, central and south of Portugal, in which all ten clubs of the corresponding conference gather together to contest their scheduled matches. Points are earned for their tables by winning matches. At the end of the regular season, the top two teams in each conferences, plus the best two third-place teams (total of eight clubs) advance to the Finals.
- Post-season: All eight clubs gather in one location for three consecutive days (the same location and dates as the Elite Division post-season events). The eight clubs play each other in a knockout tournament. The two clubs that reach the final are promoted to the Elite Championship for next season; the six clubs knocked out will remain in the National Championship for next season. The winners of the final are crowned National Championship winners.

== Clubs ==
Locations of where the 2019 Elite Division clubs originate and the host venues.
Madeira based Elite clubs

As of 2019

Key
■ – promoted at the end of 2019
■ – relegated at the end of 2019

=== Elite Championship ===
- Alfarim
- Braga
- CB Loures
- GR Amigos Paz
- Leixões
- Nacional ■
- Sesimbra ■
- Sporting CP

=== National Championship ===
==== North zone ====
- Academia Elite Sport
- Âncora Praia
- Boavista
- Chafé
- Chaves ■
- Salgueiros 08
- Varzim

==== Central zone ====
- ACD O Sótão ■
- Belenenses
- Biblioteca IR
- Buarcos 2017
- CB Caldas Rainha
- Chelas
- Estoril Praia
- GR Olival Basto
- Porto Mendo
- Sporting CP B

==== South zone ====
- Barreiro SZ
- Charneca Caparica
- Costa Caparica
- Cova da Piedade
- Marítimo
- Praia Milfontes
- Quinta do Conde
- São Domingos
- Zambujalense

== Venues ==
Scheduled for use during the 2019 season for the Elite Division:

- Praia de Buarcos, Figueira da Foz (Matchday 1)
- Praia Da Apulia, Apúlia e Fão (Matchday 2)
- Campo de Praia Foz do Arelho, Foz do Arelho (Matchday 3)
- Praia Do Ouro, Sesimbra (Matchday 4)
- Parque Urbano Albarquel, Setúbal (Matchday 5)
- Estádio Do Viveiro, Nazaré (Matchday 6 & Finals)
- Estádio Desportos de Praia, Porto (Matchday 7)

== Results ==
=== Elite Championship ===
The following lists the winners and runners-up of the top tier; the former are crowned Portuguese league champions.

Season	Winners	Runners-up
2010	Sporting CP	SL Benfica
2011	Vitória SC	Sporting CP
2012	Belenenses	ACD O Sótão
2013	Braga	Estoril Praia
2014	Braga	Sporting CP
2015	Braga	Sporting CP
2016	Sporting CP	Braga
2017	Braga	Sporting CP
2018	Braga	Sporting CP
2019	Braga	Sporting CP
2020	Sporting CP	Braga
2021	Braga	Casa Benfica de Loures
2022	Braga	Casa Benfica de Loures
2023	Braga	ACD O Sótão
2024	Braga	ACD O Sótão

Note: From 2010–2014 there was only one division comprising the league. Those results have been included as de facto Elite Division results.

==== Performance by club ====
Team	Titles	Runners-up	Years won	Years runner-up
Braga	10	2	2013, 2014, 2015, 2017, 2018, 2019, 2021, 2022, 2023, 2024	2016, 2020
Sporting CP	3	5	2010, 2016, 2020	2011, 2014, 2015, 2017, 2018, 2019
Vitória SC	1	0	2011	–
Belenenses	1	0	2012	–
ACD O Sótão	0	3	–	2012, 2023, 2024
Casa Benfica de Loures	0	2	–	2021, 2022
SL Benfica	0	1	–	2010
Estoril Praia	0	1	–	2013

=== National Championship ===
The second tier was introduced in 2015; the following lists the winners and runners-up. Both are promoted to the top tier.

Season	Winners	Runners-up
2015	Varzim	Casa Benfica de Loures
2016	Nacional	Vila Franca Rosario
2017	Leixões	Varzim
2018	Alfarim	Sesimbra
2019	ACD O Sótão	GD Chaves
2020	Varzim	Buarcos 2017
2021	Leixões	São Domingos de Setúbal
2022	GD Chaves	Belenenses
2023	AD Nazaré 2022	Vila Flor SC
2024	Ericeirense	Alfarim

==== Performance by club ====
Team	Titles	Runners-up	Years won	Years runner-up
Varzim	2	1	2015, 2020	2017
Leixões	2	0	2017, 2021	–
GD Chaves	1	1	2022	2019
Alfarim	1	1	2018	2024
Nacional	1	0	2016	–
ACD O Sótão	1	0	2019	–
AD Nazaré 2022	1	0	2023	–
Ericeirense	1	0	2024	–
Casa Benfica de Loures	0	1	–	2015
Vila Franca Rosario	0	1	–	2016
Sesimbra	0	1	–	2018
Buarcos 2017	0	1	–	2020
São Domingos de Setúbal	0	1	–	2021
Belenenses	0	1	–	2022
Vilar Flor SC	0	1	–	2023

== Performance at the Euro Winners Cup ==
The Euro Winners Cup (EWC), held every May/June since 2013, is a competition contested by the best teams from Europe's domestic beach soccer leagues to determine a European club champion.

A club's final league position determines their qualification route to the EWC. The following table shows the history of qualification opportunities for Portuguese clubs:

Qualification history
Year	Final league position				Total clubs qualified
Year	1st	2nd	3rd	4th & below	Total clubs qualified
2013–16	A	n/a			1
2017–18	A	PR			1+
2019–	A			PR	3+
Key: Qualification is... A ✓ Automatic. PR Possible; club eligible to enter the preliminary round. n/a ✗ Not possible. (Host club also qualifies automatically; From 2013–18, host country's league runners-up also qualified automatically.)

The following documents the performances of Portuguese clubs that have qualified for the EWC:

Key
C	Champions		Round of 16
2nd	Runners-up	R32	Round of 32
3rd	Third place	GS	Group stage
4th	Fourth Place	•	Did not participate
	Quarter-finals		Host club / country

Team \ Years	2013	2014	2015	2016	2017	2018	2019	2020	2021	2022	2023	2024	Total
ACD O Sótão	•	•	•	•	15th	GS	GS	7th	7th	GS	3rd	3rd	8
ACD O Sótão B	•	•	•	•	•	•	•	GS	R32	•	•	•	2
AD Nazaré 2022	•	•	•	•	•	•	•	•	•	•	•	GS	1
Alfarim	•	•	•	•	•	•	GS	•	•	•	•	•	1
Belenenses	GS	•	•	•	•	•	•	•	GS	•	•	•	2
Braga	•	3rd	5th	3rd	C	C	C	2nd	2nd	2nd	6th	C	11
Buarcos 2017	•	•	•	•	•	•	GS	•	R32	GS	•	•	3
Caxinas	•	•	•	•	•	•	•	•	GS	•	•	•	1
CB Loures	•	•	•	•	•	GS	R32	•	15th	C	•	•	4
CB Caldas da Rainha	•	•	•	•	•	•	•	•	16th	•	•	•	1
Chaves	•	•	•	•	•	•	•	•	GS	•	•	•	1
CF Chelas	•	•	•	•	•	•	GS	•	•	•	•	•	1
Costa Caparica	•	•	•	•	•	•	GS	•	•	•	•	•	1
GR Amigos Paz	•	•	•	•	•	GS	•	GS	12th	GS	GS	GS	6
Nacional	•	•	•	•	GS	•	GS	•	GS	•	R32	•	4
Os Nazarenos	•	•	•	•	•	•	•	11th	GS	•	•	•	2
Porto Mendo	•	•	•	•	•	•	•	•	GS	•	•	•	1
São Domingos	•	•	•	•	•	•	•	•	•	GS	•	•	1
Sesimbra	•	•	•	•	•	•	GS	•	GS	GS	•	•	3
Sporting CP	•	•	•	•	7th	5th	11th	9th	R32	11th	•	•	6
Varzim	•	•	•	•	•	•	•	•	R32	GS	R16	•	3
Vila Flor	•	•	•	•	•	•	•	•	GS	•	•	•	1
Portuguese teams	1	1	1	1	4	5	10	6	17	9	5	4	
