= 2014 Euro Winners Cup =

Tournament details
- Host country: Italy
- Dates: 3 – 8 June 2014
- Teams: 25 (from 1 confederation)
- Venue: 1 (in 1 host city)

Final positions
- Champions: (Russia) BSC Kristall (1st title)
- Runners-up: (Italy) Milano BS
- Third place: (Portugal) SC Braga
- Fourth place: (Switzerland) Sable Dancers Bern

Tournament statistics
- Matches played: 56
- Goals scored: 453 (8.09 per match)
- Top scorer: (Brazil) Leo (13 goals)
- Best player: (Brazil) Bruno Xavier

The second edition of Euro Winners Cup was a beach soccer tournament in Catania, Italy, from 3 – 8 June 2014. The tournament brought together club champions of many domestic beach soccer leagues across Europe, almost in the same vein as the UEFA Champions League.

== Participating teams ==
Twenty-five teams from 22 countries confirmed their participation in the tournament:

- (Italy) Catania BS (Host team)
- (Italy) Milano BS (Host Country National champion 2013)
- (Italy) AS Terracina BS (Host Country National Runner-up 2013)
- (Russia) Lokomotiv Moscow (2013 Euro Winners Cup Champion)
- (Russia) BSC Kristall
- (Spain) Aluminios Sotelo
- (Greece) AO Kefallinia
- (Ukraine) Artur Music
- (Belarus) FC BATE Borisov
- (Czech Republic) BS Bohemians 1905
- (Moldova) CS Djoker - Tornado Chișinău
- (Israel) "Falfala" Kfar Qassem
- (Hungary) Goldwin Plus Bodon FC
- (Poland) Grembach Łódź
- (Latvia) Kreiss Riga
- (France) Marseille Beach Team
- (Bulgaria) MFC Spartak 2012 Varna
- (Germany) Rostocker Robben
- (Switzerland) Sable Dancers Bern
- (Portugal) SC Braga
- (Turkey) Seferihisar CittaSlow
- (Estonia) SK Augur Enemat
- (England) Portsmouth BS
- (Kazakhstan) Ushkyn-Iskra
- (Netherlands) Egmond BS

== Group stage ==
According to the draw realized on May 26, teams were divided in a group stage with four groups of 4 and three groups of 3, then the two best-ranked sides of each group, and the best overall two third-ranked sides advanced to the round of 16.

=== Group A ===
| Team | Pld | W | W+ | L | GF | GA | +/– | Pts |
|---|---|---|---|---|---|---|---|---|
| (Italy) Catania BS | 2 | 2 | 0 | 0 | 11 | 7 | +4 | 6 |
| (Spain) Aluminios Sotelo | 2 | 2 | 0 | 1 | 17 | 10 | +7 | 6 |
| (Latvia) Kreiss | 2 | 0 | 0 | 3 | 6 | 17 | -11 | 0 |

Advances to play-off

| Catania BS (Italy) | 4–3 | (Latvia) Kreiss |
| Catania BS (Italy) | 7–4 | (Spain) Aluminios Sotelo |
| Aluminios Sotelo (Spain) | 8–2 | (Latvia) Kreiss |

=== Group B ===
| Team | Pld | W | W+ | L | GF | GA | +/– | Pts |
|---|---|---|---|---|---|---|---|---|
| (Russia) BSC Kristall | 3 | 3 | 0 | 0 | 20 | 3 | +17 | 9 |
| (Portugal) SC Braga | 3 | 2 | 0 | 1 | 12 | 6 | +6 | 6 |
| (Greece) AO Kefallinia | 3 | 1 | 0 | 2 | 7 | 21 | -14 | 3 |
| (Estonia) SK Augur Enemat | 3 | 0 | 0 | 3 | 5 | 14 | -9 | 0 |

Advances to play-off

| SC Braga (Portugal) | 7–2 | (Greece) AO Kefallinia |
| SK Augur Enemat (Estonia) | 1–6 | (Russia) BSC Kristall |
| SC Braga (Portugal) | 3–1 | (Estonia) SK Augur Enemat |
| BSC Kristall (Russia) | 11–0 | (Greece) AO Kefallinia |
| AO Kefallinia (Greece) | 5–3 | (Estonia) SK Augur Enemat |
| BSC Kristall (Russia) | 3–2 | (Portugal) SC Braga |

=== Group C ===
| Team | Pld | W | W+ | L | GF | GA | +/– | Pts |
|---|---|---|---|---|---|---|---|---|
| (Ukraine) Artur Music | 2 | 2 | 0 | 0 | 12 | 7 | +5 | 6 |
| (Israel) "Falfala" Kfar Qassem | 2 | 1 | 0 | 1 | 11 | 9 | +2 | 3 |
| (Netherlands) Egmond BS | 2 | 0 | 0 | 2 | 10 | 17 | -7 | 0 |

Advances to play-off

| "Falfala" Kfar Qassem (Israel) | 2–4 | (Ukraine) Artur Music |
| Artur Music (Ukraine) | 8–5 | (Netherlands) Egmond BS |
| Egmond BS (Netherlands) | 5–9 | (Israel) "Falfala" Kfar Qassem |

=== Group D ===
| Team | Pld | W | W+ | L | GF | GA | +/– | Pts |
|---|---|---|---|---|---|---|---|---|
| (Belarus) FC BATE Borisov | 2 | 2 | 0 | 0 | 6 | 3 | +3 | 6 |
| (Turkey) Seferihisar CittaSlow | 2 | 1 | 0 | 1 | 7 | 6 | +1 | 3 |
| (Kazakhstan) Ushkyn-Iskra | 2 | 0 | 0 | 2 | 4 | 8 | -4 | 0 |

Advances to play-off

| Ushkyn-Iskra (Kazakhstan) | 3–5 | (Turkey) Seferihisar CittaSlow |
| Seferihisar CittaSlow (Turkey) | 2–3 | (Belarus) FC BATE Borisov |
| FC BATE Borisov (Belarus) | 3–1 | (Kazakhstan) Ushkyn-Iskra |

=== Group E ===
| Team | Pld | W | W+ | L | GF | GA | +/– | Pts |
|---|---|---|---|---|---|---|---|---|
| (Switzerland) Sable Dancers Bern | 3 | 3 | 0 | 0 | 22 | 8 | +14 | 9 |
| (Czech Republic) BS Bohemians 1905 | 3 | 1 | 1 | 1 | 13 | 12 | +1 | 5 |
| (Moldova) CS Djoker – Tornado Chișinău | 3 | 0 | 1 | 2 | 10 | 12 | -2 | 2 |
| (England) Portsmouth BS | 3 | 0 | 0 | 3 | 8 | 21 | -13 | 0 |

Advances to play-off

| Portsmouth BS (England) | 3–10 | (Switzerland) Sable Dancers Bern |
| CS Djoker – Tornado Chișinău (Moldova) | 3–4 (a.e.t.) | (Czech Republic) BS Bohemians 1905 |
| CS Djoker – Tornado Chișinău (Moldova) | 4–3 (a.e.t.) | (England) Portsmouth BS |
| Sable Dancers Bern (Switzerland) | 7–2 | (Czech Republic) BS Bohemians 1905 |
| Sable Dancers Bern (Switzerland) | 5–3 | (Moldova) CS Djoker – Tornado Chișinău |
| BS Bohemians 1905 (Czech Republic) | 7–2 | (England) Portsmouth BS |

=== Group F ===
| Team | Pld | W | W+ | L | GF | GA | +/– | Pts |
|---|---|---|---|---|---|---|---|---|
| (Italy) Milano BS | 3 | 3 | 0 | 0 | 19 | 12 | +7 | 9 |
| (Poland) Grembach Łódź | 3 | 2 | 0 | 1 | 13 | 12 | +1 | 6 |
| (France) Marseille Beach Team | 3 | 1 | 0 | 2 | 15 | 14 | +1 | 3 |
| (Bulgaria) MFC Spartak 2012 Varna | 3 | 0 | 0 | 3 | 10 | 19 | -9 | 0 |

Advances to play-off

| Grembach Łódź (Poland) | 3–2 | (Bulgaria) MFC Spartak 2012 Varna |
| Marseille Beach Team (France) | 3–5 | (Italy) Milano BS |
| Grembach Łódź (Poland) | 4–3 | (France) Marseille Beach Team |
| Milano BS (Italy) | 7–3 | (Bulgaria) MFC Spartak 2012 Varna |
| MFC Spartak 2012 Varna (Bulgaria) | 5–9 | (France) Marseille Beach Team |
| Milano BS (Italy) | 7–6 | (Poland) Grembach Łódź |

=== Group G ===
| Team | Pld | W | W+ | L | GF | GA | +/– | Pts |
|---|---|---|---|---|---|---|---|---|
| (Russia) Lokomotiv Moscow | 3 | 3 | 0 | 0 | 17 | 7 | +10 | 9 |
| (Hungary) Goldwin Plus Bodon FC | 3 | 1 | 1 | 1 | 14 | 9 | +5 | 5 |
| (Italy) AS Terracina BS | 3 | 1 | 0 | 2 | 13 | 13 | 0 | 3 |
| (Germany) Rostocker Robben | 3 | 0 | 0 | 3 | 7 | 22 | -15 | 0 |

Advances to play-off

| Goldwin Plus Bodon FC (Hungary) | 4–3 (a.e.t.) | (Italy) AS Terracina BS |
| Rostocker Robben (Germany) | 2–7 | (Russia) Lokomotiv Moscow |
| AS Terracina BS (Italy) | 7–2 | (Germany) Rostocker Robben |
| Lokomotiv Moscow (Russia) | 3–2 | (Hungary) Goldwin Plus Bodon FC |
| Goldwin Plus Bodon FC (Hungary) | 8–3 | (Germany) Rostocker Robben |
| Lokomotiv Moscow (Russia) | 7–3 | (Italy) AS Terracina BS |

== Play-off ==
=== Bracket ===
First round
(Russia) BSC Kristall | 7
(France) Marseille Beach Team | 1
(Russia) Lokomotiv Moscow | 6
(Spain) Aluminios Sotelo | 2
(Ukraine) Artur Music (p) | 3 (6)
(Poland) Grembach Łódź | 3 (5)
(Switzerland) Sable Dancers Bern | 3
(Turkey) Seferihisar CittaSlow | 0
(Belarus) FC BATE Borisov | 4
(Hungary) Goldwin Plus Bodon FC | 5
(Italy) Milano BS | 3
(Czech Republic) BS Bohemians 1905 | 2
(Portugal) SC Braga | 2
(Israel) "Falfala" Kfar Qassem | 0
(Italy) Catania BS | 3
(Italy) AS Terracina BS | 2

Quarter-finals
45 | (Russia) BSC Kristall (p) | 6 (1)
(Russia) Lokomotiv Moscow | 6 (0)
46 | (Ukraine) Artur Music | 3
(Switzerland) Sable Dancers Bern | 4
47 | (Hungary) Goldwin Plus Bodon FC | 4
(Italy) Milano BS | 5
48 | (Portugal) SC Braga | 10
49 | (Italy) Catania BS | 7

Semi-finals
(Russia) BSC Kristall | 7
(Switzerland) Sable Dancers Bern | 4
(Italy) Milano BS | 6
(Portugal) SC Braga | 3

Final
(Russia) BSC Kristall | 2
(Italy) Milano BS | 0
Third place
(Switzerland) Sable Dancers Bern | 1
(Portugal) SC Braga | 4

=== 5th–8th places ===
qualifying stage
(Russia) Lokomotiv Moscow | 3
(Ukraine) Artur Music | 4
(Hungary) Goldwin Plus Bodon FC (p) | 4 (4)
(Italy) Catania BS | 4 (3)

5th place
(Ukraine) Artur Music | 5
(Hungary) Goldwin Plus Bodon FC | 1
7th place
(Russia) Lokomotiv Moscow | 7
(Italy) Catania BS | 2

== Winners ==
Euro Winners Cup
2014 Winners:

BSC Kristall
First title

== Awards ==
Best Player (MVP)
(Brazil) Bruno Xavier ( (Russia) Lokomotiv Moscow)
Top Scorer
(Portugal) Leo ( (Italy) Milano BS)
13 goals
Best Goalkeeper
(Spain) Dona ( (Portugal) SC Braga)

== Final standings ==
| Rank | Team |
|---|---|
| 1 | (Russia) BSC Kristall |
| 2 | (Italy) Milano BS |
| 3 | (Portugal) SC Braga |
| 4 | (Switzerland) Sable Dancers Bern |
| 5 | (Ukraine) Artur Music |
| 6 | (Hungary) Goldwin Plus Bodon FC |
| 7 | (Russia) Lokomotiv Moscow |
| 8 | (Italy) Catania BS |

== See also ==
- Beach soccer
- Beach Soccer Worldwide
