= Grembach Łódź =

Professional beach soccer team

- Full name: Beach Soccer Club Grembach Łódź
- Short name: Grembach
- Founded: 1979
- Chairman: (Poland) Jarosław Jagielski
- Coach: (Poland) Jarosław Jagielski
- League: Ekstraklasa
- 2016: 1.
Home colours
Away colours

Grembach Łódź has a professional beach soccer team based in Łódź, Poland.

== History ==
The team "Grembach" was founded in 1979 in near the Widzew Lodz Stadium, where even today there is an old settlement GREMBACH. Name of the settlement was given by German colonists who settled in the area in the early twentieth century. Grünbach (Polonized on Grinbach) in German means a "green brook" or "green stream".

== Euro Winners Cup 2016 squad ==
Note: Flags indicate national team as defined under FIFA eligibility rules; some limited exceptions apply. Players may hold more than one non-FIFA nationality.

No.	Pos.	Nation	Player
1	GK	POL	Dariusz Słowiński
3		ENG	Mitchell Day
4		POL	Tomasz Wydmuszek
5		POL	Marek Widzicki
7		ENG	Aaron Clarke
8		BRA	Vinicius Guedes

No.	Pos.	Nation	Player
10		POL	Daniel Baran
11		POL	Witold Ziober
12	GK	POL	Maciej Marciniak
14		POL	Marcin Olejniczak
15		POL	Adam Bogacz
16		BRA	Igor Rangel

Coach: (Poland) Jarosław Jagielski

== Honours ==
=== Polish competitions ===
- Ekstraklasa

- Winners: 2008, 2011, 2012, 2013, 2015, 2016

- Polish Beach Soccer Cup

- Winners: 2007, 2008, 2009, 2010, 2011, 2012
- Runner-up: 2016

- Polish Beach Soccer Supercup

- Winners: 2011, 2015

=== International competitions ===
- Mundialito de Clubes
- Euro Winners Cup

- Sixth Place: 2013
- 1/16: 2014, 2016
