= 2018 Euro Winners Cup =

Tournament details
- Host country: Portugal
- Dates: 25 May – 3 June 2018
- Teams: 58 (from 1 confederation)
- Venues: 2 (in 1 host city)

Final positions
- Champions: Braga (2nd title)
- Runners-up: Kristall
- Third place: KP Łódź
- Fourth place: Lokomotiv Moscow

Tournament statistics
- Matches played: 127
- Goals scored: 1,060 (8.35 per match)

The 2018 Euro Winners Cup was the sixth edition of the Euro Winners Cup (EWC), an annual continental beach soccer tournament for men's top-division European clubs. The championship is the sport's version of the better known UEFA Champions League in association football.

Organised by Beach Soccer Worldwide (BSWW), the tournament was held in Nazaré, Portugal, from 25 May till 3 June 2018, consisting of a preliminary qualifying round and the competition proper.

Following the qualifying round, the competition proper began with a round-robin group stage. At its conclusion, the best teams progressed to the knockout stage, a series of single-elimination games to determine the winners, starting with the round of 16 and ending with the final. Consolation matches were also played to determine other final rankings.

Braga of Portugal were the defending champions and successfully defended their title after beating Kristall of Russia on penalties in the final.

== Teams ==
A record 58 teams entered the championship; 26 qualified straight into the main round, whilst 32 competed in the Nazaré Cup / preliminary round to attempt to qualify for the competition proper.

26 different nations were represented.

=== Qualification ===
As per BSWW regulations, qualification for the 2018 EWC is achieved as follows:

- The reigning champions qualify automatically into the main round (Braga of Portugal).
- The winners of all European national beach soccer leagues/championships are entitled to automatic qualification into the main round (but no league champion from Portugal qualified as this was Braga who had already qualified as current EWC champions).
- The host club qualifies automatically to the main round (ACD Sótão), along with the winners and runners-up of its country's national league. (As a Portuguese club, the winners of its country's league was Braga who had already qualified. Therefore, this spot was rewarded to the team that finished third in the FPF Campeonato Nacional.)
- Any other club who did not win their respective national league can enter the Nazaré Cup / preliminary round for a last attempt to qualify for the main round.

=== Entrants ===
For context, in February 2018, BSWW deemed the top four leagues in Europe to be (in no particular order) the Portuguese, Russian, Italian and Spanish leagues.

Key: H: Hosts \ TH: Title holders

Main round
Braga (TH)	Egmond	Nõmme	Oslo
ACD Sótão (H)	Vybir	Rostocker Robben	West Deva
Sporting CP (2nd)	KP Lódz	Vamos Braine le Château	SK BO EU Teplice
GR Amigos Paz (3rd)	Dinamo Batumi	Kreiss Riga	Djoker Chisinau
Lokomotiv Moscow	Alanya Belediyespor	Marseille	Igol Vilnius
Sambenedettese	BATE Borisov	AO Kefallinia	Copenhagen
Melistar Melilla	Spartak Varna		
Preliminary round / Nazaré Cup
Chelas	BIR	Playas de Mazarrón	Siófoki Bányász SE
Leixões	Benfica Caldas da Rainha	AIS Playas de San Javier	Olimpia-Stels
GR Olival Basto	Casa Benfica de Loures	Kristall	Portsmouth
Varzim	Salgueiros 08	Delta Saratov	Falfala Kfar Qassem
GDP Costa de Caparica	Viareggio	Dunkerquois Littoral	Academy
São Domingos	Catania	Montpellier Hérault	APS Napoli Patron
AD Buarcos	Atletico Licata	Artur Music	Boca Gdańsk
Nacional	Levante	Wuppertaler SV	BSMA

== Venues ==
Praia de Nazaré (Nazaré Beach) is the host location of the competition for the second year running	Location of Nazaré in Portugal.

Two venues were used in one host city: Nazaré and Leiria District. Matches took place at Praia de Nazaré (Nazaré Beach) on one of two pitches. The main pitch, otherwise known as the Estádio do Viveiro (Viveiro Stadium), with a capacity of 1,600, hosted 79 matches, including all main bracket ties in the knockout stage. Pitch 2, a purpose made pitch, located adjacent to the main stadium, hosted 48 matches.

== Squads ==
Each club must submit a squad of a maximum of 12 players that includes a minimum of two goalkeepers. Players are to be assigned shirt numbers between 1 and 22 (the number 1 must be reserved for a goalkeeper). Three delegates must accompany the players, including at least one medical personnel. A maximum of three foreign players are allowed to be part of the squad. This was later increased to four, however a maximum of three of these players are permitted to play in a match.

== Draws ==
The draws took place on May 9 at 12:00 local time in Nazaré, at the Biblioteca Municipal de Nazaré (Nazaré Public Library), conducted by the Mayor of Nazaré, Walter Chicharro, PFP Director Pedro Dias, BSWW Deputy Vice-President, Gabino Renales and BSWW Head of Competitions, Josep Ponset.

=== Nazaré Cup (preliminary round) ===
The BSWW organising committee decided to split the 32 teams into eight groups of four, conducting the draw as follows:

Draw procedure
- The clubs were seeded. Initially, from every country represented, each club that finished highest in its country's national league were grouped together and ordered based upon the final ranking of the club that represented their national association in the previous edition of the championship.
- The top eight clubs in this order received the top eight seeds and were automatically assigned to the groups, with the 1st seed placed in position A1 through to the 8th seed allocated to H1.
- Out of the remaining 24 clubs, again, from each country still represented, each club that finished highest in its country's national league were grouped together and ordered based upon the 2017 final ranking once more. These clubs in this order received the next top seeds available.
- For the countries still represented by one or more clubs, this process repeated until every club was seeded.
- The 24 teams were split into three pots, with the highest seeds placed into pot 1 down to the lowest seeds placed in pot 3.
- Each pot consisted of eight teams.
- One team from each pot was drawn into each of the groups, A through H, chronologically. The teams from pot 1 were assigned to position 2, those from pot 2, assigned to position 3 and those from pot 3, position 4.
- Teams from the same association could not be drawn into the same group, except for Portuguese clubs due to the volume of teams from said country.

Pots
Auto-assigned clubs	Pot 1	Pot 2	Pot 3
(Portugal) Nacional (assigned to A1); (Ukraine) Artur Music (assigned to B1); (Russia) Kristall (assigned to C1); (Spain) Levante (assigned to D1); (Italy) Catania (assigned to E1); (Georgia (country)) BSMA (assigned to F1); (Poland) Boca Gdańsk (assigned to G1); (Hungary) Siófoki Bányász SE (assigned to H1)	(Portugal) Casa Benfica de Loures; (Russia) Delta Saratov; (Spain) Playas de Mazarrón; (Italy) Viareggio; (Israel) Falfala Kfar Qassem; (Germany) Wuppertaler SV; (England) Portsmouth; (Latvia) Academy	(France) Montpellier Hérault; (Greece) APS Napoli Patron; (Moldova) Olimpia-Stels; (Portugal) Leixões; (Spain) AIS Playas de San Javier; (Italy) Atletico Licata; (France) Dunkerque Littoral; (Portugal) Varzim	(Portugal) Benfica Caldas da Rainha; (Portugal) AD Buarcos; (Portugal) GDP Costa de Caparica; (Portugal) Salgueiros 08; (Portugal) GR Olival Basto; (Portugal) Chelas; (Portugal) BIR; (Portugal) São Domingos

=== Main round ===
The BSWW organising committee decided to split the 34 teams into seven groups of four and two groups of three. Two of the groups of four involve the eight qualifiers from the preliminary round. This meant the draw concerned determining just five of the seven groups of four, conducted as follows:

Draw procedure
- The clubs were seeded. ACD Sótão, as the club of the host city, were given the number 1 seed and assigned to position A1. Braga, as defending champions, were seeded 2nd and assigned to B1.
- The other clubs were then seeded based upon the final ranking of the club that represented their national association in the previous edition of the championship. (With two Portuguese clubs concerned, GR Amigos Paz were not seeded at this stage as they finished the lower of the two in their national league)
- The next top five seeded clubs were automatically assigned to the groups, with the 3rd seed placed in position C1 through to the 7th seed allocated to G1.
- GR Amigos Paz were then added into the ranking with the remaining teams who were then split into three pots, with the highest seeds placed into pot 1 down to the lowest seeds placed in pot 3 (along with four non-seeded teams as there was no representative club of their association in the last edition to calculate a seed from).
- Pot 1 & 2 consisted of seven teams, whilst pot 3 contained just five teams.
- From pots 1 and 2, one team from each was drawn into each of the groups, A through G. The teams from pot 1 were assigned to position 2 in that group and those from pot 2, assigned to position 3.
- From pot 3, the teams were drawn along with another ball from an additional pot, pot 4. The seven balls in this fourth pot were marked with the group positions A4 through G4. The position drawn from pot 4, the club drawn from pot 3 was allocated to.
- As there were just five pot 3 teams but seven position marked balls, this meant two group positions would not be picked from pot 4, therefore determining which two groups would consist of just three clubs and ensuring this was determined at random.
- Teams from the same association could not be drawn into the same group.

Pots
Auto-assigned clubs	Pot 1	Pot 2	Pot 3
(Portugal) ACD Sótão (assigned to A1); (Portugal) Braga (assigned to B1); (Portugal) Sporting CP (assigned to C1); (Ukraine) Vybir (assigned to D1); (Russia) Lokomotiv Moscow (assigned to E1); (Spain) Melistar Melilla (assigned to F1); (Italy) Sambenedettese (assigned to G1)	(Portugal) GR Amigos Paz; (Georgia (country)) Dinamo Batumi; (Poland) KP Lódz; (Turkey) Alanya Belediyespor; (Bulgaria) Spartak Varna; (Belarus) BATE Borisov; (Estonia) Nõmme	(Germany) Rostocker Robben; (Belgium) Vamos Braine le Château; (Netherlands) Egmond; (Latvia) Kreiss; (France) Marseille; (Greece) AO Kefallinia; (Romania) West Deva	(Moldova) Djoker Chisinau; (Denmark) Copenhagen (unseeded); (Lithuania) Igol Vilnius (unseeded); (Norway) Oslo (unseeded); (Czech Republic) SK BO EU Teplice (unseeded)

== Nazaré Cup (incl. preliminary round) ==
Nazaré Cup
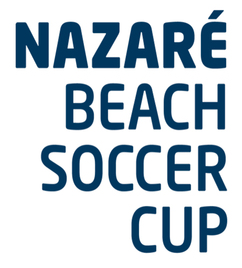
- Logo, often accompanied with the main 2018 EWC logo.
Further information
Tournament details
Host country	Portugal
Dates	25–31 May 2018
Teams	32 (from 1 confederation)
Venues	2 (in 1 host city)
Final positions
Champions	Kristall
Runners-up	Falfala Kfar Qassem
Tournament statistics
Matches played	69
Goals scored	515 (7.46 per match)
Top scorer(s)	Gabriele Gori (15 goals)

The preliminary round is open to all clubs who did not automatically qualify for the main round as domestic league champions.

=== Overview ===
==== Decision to make changes ====
The preliminary round has undergone considerable changes. In last season's EWC, five of the eight quarter-finalists and three of the four semifinalists qualified via this route; just three teams in the quarter-finals and one team in the semi-finals was an automatic qualifier / national league champion.

To protect the competition's original purpose as a championship primarily for Europe's league champions, BSWW made changes ensuring that this year only two quarter-finalists and subsequently one semifinalist would be non-champion qualifiers from the preliminary round. Three semifinalists were guaranteed to be a national league champion.

This was later revised so that only one team in the quarter-finals would be a qualifier, whilst the other seven would be guaranteed to be a league champion. A qualifier was no longer ensured of a semifinal spot.

==== Format ====
This season, embedded within the wider scope of this edition of the Euro Winners Cup, an additional tournament will be taking place. It has been described as a "tournament within a tournament". This supplementary event is known as the Nazaré Beach Soccer Cup (NBSC):-

The preliminary round of this year's EWC forms the first stage of the NBSC, taking place from 25–27 May:-

1. The NBSC is open to all teams who did not automatically qualify for the Main Round.
2. The teams that enter will be split into groups of four, competing in a round robin format.
3. The eight group winners qualify for the Main Round of the EWC.

In the Main Round, the NBSC will continue:-

4. The eight qualifiers will be kept together in two groups of four.
5. Four clubs, the two top teams from each group, were originally to planned progress to the Round of 16 of the EWC. This was later reduced to just two clubs, the two group winners.
6. The two teams will play each other in the Round of 16. This match will therefore also count as the final of the NBSC.
7. The winner of the NBSC will then be crowned, rewarded with a spot in the EWC quarter-finals.

=== Group A ===
Pos	Team	Pld	W	W+	WP	L	GF	GA	GD	Pts	Qualification
1	Playas de Mazarrón	3	3	0	0	0	10	1	+9	9	Main Round
2	Nacional	3	2	0	0	1	13	8	+5	6	
3	Olimpia-Stels	3	1	0	0	2	4	12	–8	3	
4	GDP Costa da Caparica	3	0	0	0	3	5	11	–6	0	

25 May 2018	Playas de Mazarrón (Spain)	4–0	(Moldova) Olimpia-Stels	Pitch 2
16:30	Castillo 10'; Rigaud 16', 22', 29'	Report(ru)

25 May 2018	GDP Costa da Caparica (Portugal)	3–6	(Portugal) Nacional	Main pitch
19:00	Santos Júnior 5'; Carrilho 15' dos Santos 36'	Report(ru)	4', 15' Silva; 8' (pen.), 30' Dhaouadi; 15', 24' Ribeiro	Referee: Alfredo Pavone (Italy)

26 May 2018	Playas de Mazarrón (Spain)	2–1	(Portugal) GDP Costa da Caparica	Pitch 2
16:30	Alfredo 11'; Juan Manuel 21'	Report(ru)	15' Karilyo

26 May 2018	Nacional (Portugal)	7–1	(Moldova) Olimpia-Stels	Main pitch
19:00	Oliveira 1', 24'; Silva 5'; Jasmins 8', 29'; Ribeiro 14'; Gomez 15'	Report(ru)	1' Capsamun	Referee: Raffaele Delvecchio (Italy)

27 May 2018	Olimpia-Stels (Moldova)	3–1	(Portugal) GDP Costa da Caparica	Pitch 2
16:30	Trofim 13'; Melnikov 26', 31'	Report(ru)	20' Dias

27 May 2018	Nacional (Portugal)	0–4	(Spain) Playas de Mazarrón	Main pitch
19:00		Report(ru)	Pampero 7'; Domingo 11'; Castillo 15'; Rigaud 34'

=== Group B ===
Pos	Team	Pld	W	W+	WP	L	GF	GA	GD	Pts	Qualification
1	Artur Music	3	3	0	0	0	13	8	+5	9	Main Round
2	Delta Saratov	3	2	0	0	1	11	6	+5	6	
3	AIS Playas de San Javier	3	1	0	0	2	11	10	+1	3	
4	BIR	3	0	0	0	3	5	16	–11	0	

25 May 2018	Delta Saratov (Russia)	2–1	(Spain) AIS Playas de San Javier	Pitch 2
15:15	Nasimento 12'; Pankratov 13'	Report(ru)	16' Barbotti

25 May 2018	BIR (Portugal)	1–4	(Ukraine) Artur Music	Main pitch
17:45	Murrakash 30'	Report(ru)	9' Rafinha; 15', 29' Borsuk; 27' Medved	Referee: Richard De Bruijn (Netherlands)

26 May 2018	Delta Saratov (Russia)	6–1	(Portugal) BIR	Pitch 2
15:15	Mateus 2', 21'; Andreev 6', 17'; Sakharov 28'; Soldatov 35'	Report(ru)	23' Fernandez

26 May 2018	Artur Music (Ukraine)	5–4	(Spain) AIS Playas de San Javier	Main pitch
17:45	El Hadoui 14'; Stepliani 16', 29'; Medved 30'; Rafinha 31'	Report(ru)	4', 35' Barqueros; 16' Barbotti; 33' Carro Juan	Referee: Jurijs Ivusins (Latvia)

27 May 2018	AIS Playas de San Javier (Spain)	6–3	(Portugal) BIR	Pitch 2
15:15	Nene 16'; Barbotti 16', 29'; Carro Juan 17'; Maiquez 22', 33'	Report(ru)	22' Fernandez; 33' Pombinha; 34' Ilario

27 May 2018	Artur Music (Ukraine)	4–3	(Russia) Delta Saratov	Main pitch
17:45	Glutsky 8'; Medved 12' (pen.); Korniichuk 32', 36'	Report(ru)	28' Mateus; 32' Konnov; 33' Andreev

=== Group C ===
Pos	Team	Pld	W	W+	WP	L	GF	GA	GD	Pts	Qualification
1	Kristall	3	3	0	0	0	32	1	+31	9	Main Round
2	Salgueiros 08	3	2	0	0	1	11	16	–5	6	
3	Academy	3	1	0	0	2	6	17	–11	3	
4	Varzim	3	0	0	0	3	6	21	–15	0	

25 May 2018	Academy (Latvia)	4–2	(Portugal) Varzim	Pitch 2
14:00	Skuratovičs 12'; Josifovs 16'; Pastars 29'; Pūpols 34' (pen.)	Report(ru)	7', 36' Luca

25 May 2018	Salgueiros 08 (Portugal)	1–10	(Russia) Kristall	Main pitch
16:30	Gilberto 28'	Report(ru)	7', 36' Mauricinho; 12', 18', 23' Romanov; 19' Shishin; 22' Rodrigo; 25' (pen.), 31' Zharikov; 26' Kartashov	Referee: Nuno Madeira Baptista (Switzerland)

26 May 2018	Academy (Latvia)	2–5	(Portugal) Salgueiros 08	Pitch 2
14:00	Seb Huck 2' (o.g.); Pastars 36'	Report(ru)	1' Freddy; 3' Trivelas; 22' Marco; 28' (pen.) Resend; 29' Vasco

26 May 2018	Kristall (Russia)	12–0	(Portugal) Varzim	Main pitch
16:30	Rodrigo 4', 9', 33'; Paporotnyi 13'; Shishin 20'; Romanov 23', 31'; Datinha 23'; Kartashov 26', 35'; Mauricinho 30'; Zharikov 35'	Report(ru)

27 May 2018	Varzim (Portugal)	4–5	(Portugal) Salgueiros 08	Pitch 2
14:00	Peixoto 2'; Rajoel 17'; Novo 30'; Hugo Pinto 30' (o.g.)	Report(ru)	1', 8', 25', 31' Marco; 17' Resend

27 May 2018	Kristall (Russia)	10–0	(Latvia) Academy	Main pitch
16:30	Datinha 2', 36'; Rodrigo 4'; Mauricinho 17', 23'; Krasheninnikov 23'; Paporotnyi 25', 32'; Romanov 30'; Chuzhkov 30'	Report(ru)

=== Group D ===
Pos	Team	Pld	W	W+	WP	L	GF	GA	GD	Pts	Qualification
1	Falfala Kfar Qassem	3	3	0	0	0	27	15	+12	9	Main Round
2	Levante	3	2	0	0	1	20	12	+8	6	
3	AD Buarcos	3	1	0	0	2	11	21	–10	3	
4	Dunkerquois Littoral	3	0	0	0	3	7	17	–10	0	

25 May 2018	Falfala Kfar Qassem (Israel)	7–4	(France) Dunkerquois Littoral	Pitch 2
12:45	Ott 2' (pen.), 16'; Llorenç 3', 34'; Ozu 14'; Sarsur 19'; Yatim 27'	Report(ru)	20' Herinckx; 27', 33' (pen.) Venza; 31' Marche

25 May 2018	AD Buarcos (Portugal)	2–8	(Spain) Levante	Main pitch
15:15	Mendes 4'; Guerra 25'	Report(ru)	1', 11' Thiago H. 8' José Enrique; 13', 25' Sanfilippo; 17' Miralles; 22', 36' Clarke

26 May 2018	Falfala Kfar Qassem (Israel)	11–4	(Portugal) AD Buarcos	Pitch 2
12:45	Ott 3' (pen.), 4'; Moad 5', 23'; Yatim 7'; Llorenç 16', 16', 22'; Danin 17', 18'; Bruno Xavier 32' (pen.)	Report(ru)	1', 26' Da Silva; 9' Guerra; 20' Mendes

26 May 2018	Levante (Spain)	5–1	(France) Dunkerquois Littoral	Main pitch
15:15	José Enrique 4'; Antonio 9', 25'; Fernando 16'; Sanfilippo 29'	Report(ru)	1' Herinckx	Referee: Francisco Costa (Portugal)

27 May 2018	Dunkerquois Littoral (France)	2–5	(Portugal) AD Buarcos	Pitch 2
12:45	Marche 6'; Favolini 28'	Report(ru)	1', 15' Mendes; 20', 23' Oliveira; 21' Filipe Gaspar

27 May 2018	Levante (Spain)	7–9	(Israel) Falfala Kfar Qassem	Main pitch
15:15	José Enrique 2', 11'; Antonio 5', 11', 36'; Thiago H. 31'; Clarke 31'	Report(ru)	1' Yatim; 3', 20' Bruno Xavier; 11', 12', 12', 18', 35' Ott; 30' Jabareen	Referee: Oezcan Sultanolu (Turkey)

=== Group E ===
Pos	Team	Pld	W	W+	WP	L	GF	GA	GD	Pts	Qualification
1	Catania	3	3	0	0	0	27	9	+18	9	Main Round
2	Wuppertaler SV	3	2	0	0	1	10	10	0	6	
3	Montpellier Hérault	3	0	0	1	2	9	15	–6	1	
4	Benfica Caldas da Rainha	3	0	0	0	3	8	20	–12	0	

25 May 2018	Wuppertaler SV (Germany)	3–2	(France) Montpellier Hérault	Pitch 2
11:30		Report(ru)

25 May 2018	Benfica Caldas da Rainha (Portugal)	3–12	(Italy) Catania	Main pitch
14:00		Report(ru)		Referee: Viktor Listratov (Russia)

26 May 2018	Wuppertaler SV (Germany)	4–1	(Portugal) Benfica Caldas da Rainha	Pitch 2
11:30		Report(ru)

26 May 2018	Catania (Italy)	8–3	(France) Montpellier Hérault	Main pitch
14:00		Report(ru)

27 May 2018	Montpellier Hérault (France)	4–4 (a.e.t.) (3–2 p)	(Portugal) Benfica Caldas da Rainha	Pitch 2
11:30		Report(ru)

27 May 2018	Catania (Italy)	7–3	(Germany) Wuppertaler SV	Main pitch
14:00		Report(ru)

=== Group F ===
Pos	Team	Pld	W	W+	WP	L	GF	GA	GD	Pts	Qualification
1	Viareggio	3	3	0	0	0	32	8	+24	9	Main Round
2	APS Napoli Patron	3	2	0	0	1	11	8	+3	6	
3	GR Olival Basto	3	1	0	0	2	5	10	–5	3	
4	BSMA	3	0	0	0	3	5	27	–22	0	

25 May 2018	Viareggio (Italy)	5–4	(Greece) APS Napoli Patron	Pitch 2
10:15	Gori 7', 7', 9'; Yano 25'; Ramaciotti 30'	Report(ru)	5' Semenov; 7' Chachalis; 7' Panikin; 20' Tsimpitsis

25 May 2018	GR Olival Basto (Portugal)	3–0	(Georgia (country)) BSMA	Main pitch
12:45	Varao 31'; Cardoso 31'; Pinneiro 33'	Report(ru)

26 May 2018	Viareggio (Italy)	8–1	(Portugal) GR Olival Basto	Pitch 2
10:15	Gori 3', 36'; Marinai 3'; Yano 5', 29'; Cardoso 5' (pen.); Valenti 6'; Ramaciotti 12'	Report(ru)

26 May 2018	BSMA (Georgia (country))	2–5	(Greece) APS Napoli Patron	Main pitch
12:45	Mikeladze 3'; Kakashvili 10'	Report(ru)	5', 19' Panikin; 7', 22' (pen.) Semenov	Referee: Yeliz Topaloglu (Turkey)

27 May 2018	APS Napoli Patron (Greece)	2–1	(Portugal) GR Olival Basto	Main pitch
09:00	Semenov 25'; Panikin 26'	Report(ru)	9' Rosa

27 May 2018	BSMA (Georgia (country))	3–19	(Italy) Viareggio	Main pitch
12:45	Mikeladze 5'; Kakashvili 20', 32'	Report(ru)	5', 6', 21' (pen.), 22', 30', 31' Gori; 12' Cinquini; 15' Marinai; 18', 34', 35' Marinai; 16', 17' Yano; 19' Carpita; 20' Ramaciotti; 26' D'onofrio; 28' Dias; 32' (pen.) Spacca; 36' Capo

=== Group G ===
Pos	Team	Pld	W	W+	WP	L	GF	GA	GD	Pts	Qualification
1	Boca Gdańsk	3	2	1	0	0	25	6	+19	8	Main Round
2	Leixões	3	2	0	0	1	13	13	0	6	
3	São Domingos	3	0	1	0	2	8	17	–9	2	
4	Portsmouth	3	0	0	0	3	8	18	–10	0	

25 May 2018	Portsmouth (England)	4–5	(Portugal) Leixões	Main pitch
09:00		Report(ru)

25 May 2018	São Domingos (Portugal)	1–10	(Poland) Boca Gdańsk	Main pitch
11:30		Report(ru)		Referee: Gionni Matticoli (Italy)

26 May 2018	Portsmouth (England)	3–4 (a.e.t.)	(Portugal) São Domingos	Pitch 2
09:00		Report(ru)

26 May 2018	Boca Gdańsk (Poland)	6–4 (a.e.t.)	(Portugal) Leixões	Main pitch
11:30		Report(ru)		Referee: Attila Balint (Romania)

27 May 2018	Leixões (Portugal)	4–3	(Portugal) São Domingos	Pitch 2
09:00		Report(ru)

27 May 2018	Boca Gdańsk (Poland)	9–1	(England) Portsmouth	Main pitch
11:30		Report(ru)

=== Group H ===
Pos	Team	Pld	W	W+	WP	L	GF	GA	GD	Pts	Qualification
1	Casa Benfica de Loures	3	3	0	0	0	34	10	+24	9	Main Round
2	Siófoki Bányász SE	3	1	0	1	1	10	11	–1	4	
3	Chelas	3	1	0	0	2	14	16	–2	3	
4	Atletico Licata	3	0	0	0	3	6	27	–21	0	

25 May 2018	Casa Benfica de Loures (Portugal)	17–2	(Italy) Atletico Licata	Pitch 2
09:00		Report(ru)

25 May 2018	Chelas (Portugal)	3–3 (a.e.t.) (1–3 p)	(Hungary) Siófoki Bányász SE	Main pitch
10:15		Report(ru)

26 May 2018	Casa Benfica de Loures (Portugal)	11–6	(Portugal) Chelas	Main pitch
09:00		Report(ru)

26 May 2018	Siófoki Bányász SE (Hungary)	5–2	(Italy) Atletico Licata	Main pitch
10:15		Report(ru)		Referee: Alberto Gomez Lameiro (Spain)

27 May 2018	Atletico Licata (Italy)	2–5	(Portugal) Chelas	Pitch 2
10:15		Report(ru)

27 May 2018	Siófoki Bányász SE (Hungary)	2–6	(Portugal) Casa Benfica de Loures	Main pitch
10:15		Report(ru)

=== Subsequent rounds ===
==== Second group stage ====
The eight qualifiers progressed to the second group stage that took place as part of the main round of the EWC.

==== Final ====
The best two teams of the second group stage advanced to the final that took place as part of the round of 16 of the EWC.

== Main round ==
Location of teams in the 2018 Euro Winners Cup main round.
Groups key: A; B; C; D; E; F; G; H; I.

The Main Round commenced on 28 May and ended on 30 May.

34 teams entered into the Main Round – 26 European domestic league champions (and select league runners-up) who qualify automatically plus eight qualifiers from the preliminary round, competing in a round robin format.

Official practice sessions for the automatic qualifiers took place on 26 and 27 May.

- Nazaré Cup qualifiers draw:

The draw to split the eight Nazaré Cup qualifiers into two groups of four took place on 27 May, after the conclusion of the day's matches.

All eight clubs were placed in one pot. As the clubs were drawn, they were alternately placed in Groups H and I. The draw was conducted by Leticia Villar of AIS Playas de San Javier Women and Aaron Clarke of Levante.

The Main Round fixtures for Groups A–G were announced on 17 May. The matches for the Nazaré Cup qualifiers groups (H and I) were released on 27 May once the composition of said groups was confirmed.

All times are local, WEST (UTC+1).

=== Group A ===
Pos	Team	Pld	W	W+	WP	L	GF	GA	GD	Pts	Qualification
1	KP Łódź	2	2	0	0	0	9	5	+4	6	Knockout stage
2	Kreiss	2	1	0	0	1	4	4	0	3	Knockout stage
3	ACD Sótão	2	0	0	0	2	4	8	–4	0	

28 May 2018	ACD Sótão (Portugal)	1–2	(Latvia) Kreiss	Main pitch
19:00	Carmo 1'	Report(ru)	19' Novožilovs; 32' Jak	Referee: Pablo Brea (Spain)

29 May 2018	KP Łódź (Poland)	3–2	(Latvia) Kreiss	Pitch 2
17:45	Saganowski 8'; Kubiak 11'; Gac 23'	Report(ru)	5' Ruba; 22' Jak

30 May 2018	ACD Sótão (Portugal)	3–6	(Poland) KP Łódź	Main pitch
19:00	Goto 1'; Carmo 11'; Lauro 31'	Report(ru)	10', 25' Krawczyk; 14' Poplawski; 21' Jesionowski; 24' Paulinho; 29' Kubiak	Referee: Csaba Baghy (Hungary)

=== Group B ===
Pos	Team	Pld	W	W+	WP	L	GF	GA	GD	Pts	Qualification
1	Braga	3	3	0	0	0	34	4	+30	9	Knockout stage
2	Spartak Varna	3	2	0	0	1	12	17	–5	6	Knockout stage
3	Marseille	3	1	0	0	2	13	19	–6	3	
4	SK BO EU Teplice	3	0	0	0	3	10	29	–19	0	

28 May 2018	SK BO EU Teplice (Czech Republic)	2–14	(Portugal) Braga	Main pitch
16:30		Report(ru)		Referee: Richard De Bruijn (Netherlands)

28 May 2018	Spartak Varna (Bulgaria)	5–3	(France) Marseille	Pitch 2
17:45	Iliev 26'; Adamov 29'; Papastathopoulos 32', 36'; Filipov 34'	Report(ru)	5', 31' (pen.) Mendy; 17' Bru

29 May 2018	Spartak Varna (Bulgaria)	7–3	(Czech Republic) SK BO EU Teplice	Pitch 2
16:30	Filipov 3', 5', 35'; Papastathopoulos 6'; Tsvetkov 12', 33'; Bowes 13'	Report(ru)	18' Baran; 22' Cerny; 30' Husty

29 May 2018	Braga (Portugal)	9–2	(France) Marseille	Main pitch
19:00		Report(ru)		Referee: Jurijs Ivusins (Latvia)

30 May 2018	Braga (Portugal)	11–0	(Bulgaria) Spartak Varna	Main pitch
16:30		Report(ru)

30 May 2018	Marseille (France)	8–5	(Czech Republic) SK BO EU Teplice	Pitch 2
17:45		Report(ru)

=== Group C ===
Pos	Team	Pld	W	W+	WP	L	GF	GA	GD	Pts	Qualification
1	Sporting CP	3	2	1	0	0	29	9	+20	8	Knockout stage
2	Nõmme	3	2	0	0	1	12	16	–4	6	Knockout stage
3	Egmond	3	1	0	0	2	13	15	–2	3	
4	Copenhagen	3	0	0	0	3	6	20	–14	0	

28 May 2018	Copenhagen (Denmark)	1–12	(Portugal) Sporting CP	Main pitch
15:15		Report(ru)

28 May 2018	Nõmme (Estonia)	5–4	(Netherlands) Egmond	Pitch 2
16:30		Report(ru)

29 May 2018	Nõmme (Estonia)	5–3	(Denmark) Copenhagen	Pitch 2
15:15		Report(ru)

29 May 2018	Sporting CP (Portugal)	8–6 (a.e.t.)	(Netherlands) Egmond	Main pitch
16:30		Report(ru)		Referee: Moussa Bounaanaa (France)

30 May 2018	Sporting CP (Portugal)	9–2	(Estonia) Nõmme	Main pitch
15:15		Report(ru)		Referee: Alberto Gomez Lameiro (Spain)

30 May 2018	Egmond (Netherlands)	3–2	(Denmark) Copenhagen	Pitch 2
16:30		Report(ru)

=== Group D ===
Pos	Team	Pld	W	W+	WP	L	GF	GA	GD	Pts	Qualification
1	Vybir	3	3	0	0	0	8	2	+6	9	Knockout stage
2	West Deva	3	1	1	0	1	14	12	+2	5	Knockout stage
3	GR Amigos Paz	3	1	0	0	2	12	11	+1	3	
4	Oslo	3	0	0	0	3	5	14	–9	0	

28 May 2018	GR Amigos Paz (Portugal)	6–7	(Romania) West Deva	Pitch 2
11:30		Report(ru)

28 May 2018	Oslo (Norway)	0–3	(Ukraine) Vybir	Main pitch
12:45		Report(ru)	1', 13' Kanstantsinau; 18' Nerush

29 May 2018	GR Amigos Paz (Portugal)	5–2	(Norway) Oslo	Pitch 2
11:30		Report(ru)

29 May 2018	Vybir (Ukraine)	3–1	(Romania) West Deva	Main pitch
12:45	Bokach 12'; Cherevko 16'; Zborovskyi 34'	Report(ru)	33' Boata	Referee: Nuno Madeira Baptista (Switzerland)

30 May 2018	West Deva (Romania)	6–3	(Norway) Oslo	Pitch 2
11:30		Report(ru)

30 May 2018	Vybir (Ukraine)	2–1	(Portugal) GR Amigos Paz	Pitch 2
14:00	Cherevko 11', 31'	Report(ru)	7' Oliveira

=== Group E ===
Pos	Team	Pld	W	W+	WP	L	GF	GA	GD	Pts	Qualification
1	Lokomotiv Moscow	3	3	0	0	0	26	5	+21	9	Knockout stage
2	Alanya Belediyespor	3	2	0	0	1	17	11	+6	6	Knockout stage
3	Igol Vilnius	3	1	0	0	2	10	16	–6	3	
4	Vamos Braine le Château	3	0	0	0	3	1	22	–21	0	

28 May 2018	Alanya Belediyespor (Turkey)	8–1	(Belgium) Vamos Braine le Château	Pitch 2
10:15	Mehmet 6'; Keskin 12', 20', 30'; Garcindo 22'; Yücel 24'; Kuman 36' (pen.); Yasin 36'	Report(ru)	6' Berlot

28 May 2018	Igol Vilnius (Lithuania)	2–10	(Russia) Lokomotiv Moscow	Main pitch
11:30	Vasiljevs 6'; Stankevičius 21'	Report(ru)	2' Krutikov; 8' Shkarin; 14', 20', 24' Nikonorov; 18' Lucão; 30' Fedorov; 32' Filippov; 34', 35' Nelito	Referee: Vladimir Tashkov (Bulgaria)

29 May 2018	Alanya Belediyespor (Turkey)	6–1	(Lithuania) Igol Vilnius	Pitch 2
10:15	Keskin 2', 16', 35'; Kuman 4'; Garcindo 19'; Rui Mota 21'	Report(ru)	23' (pen.) Pernai

29 May 2018	Lokomotiv Moscow (Russia)	7–0	(Belgium) Vamos Braine le Château	Main pitch
11:30	Lucão 1', 14', 17'; Fedorov 3', 34'; Nikonorov 8'; Dronov 32'	Report(ru)		Referee: Csaba Baghy (Hungary)

30 May 2018	Vamos Braine le Château (Belgium)	0–7	(Lithuania) Igol Vilnius	Pitch 2
10:15		Report(ru)	10' Vasiljevs; 16', 21' Meskinis; 22' Smolkovas; 23', 33', 34' Pernai

30 May 2018	Lokomotiv Moscow (Russia)	9–3	(Turkey) Alanya Belediyespor	Main pitch
11:30	Fedorov 2'; Lucão 5', 11', 25'; Nikonorov 7', 21'; Shkarin 25'; Rui 27' (o.g.); Filippov 32'	Report(ru)	22' Keskin; 24' Yasin; 30' Sinc	Referee: Alfredo Pavone (Italy)

=== Group F ===
Pos	Team	Pld	W	W+	WP	L	GF	GA	GD	Pts	Qualification
1	BATE Borisov	3	3	0	0	0	16	7	+9	9	Knockout stage
2	Melistar Melilla	3	2	0	0	1	23	9	+14	6	Knockout stage
3	AO Kefallinia	3	1	0	0	2	7	15	–8	3	
4	Djoker Chisinau	3	0	0	0	3	5	20	–15	0	

28 May 2018	BATE Borisov (Belarus)	5–2	(Greece) AO Kefallinia	Pitch 2
09:00	Aksenov 2', 14', 31'; Flengas 7' (o.g.); Davidovich 8'	Report(ru)	18' Kafantaris; 34' Mangos

28 May 2018	Djoker Chisinau (Moldova)	2–11	(Spain) Melistar Melilla	Main pitch
10:15		Report(ru)		Referee: Alfredo Pavone (Italy)

29 May 2018	BATE Borisov (Belarus)	6–1	(Moldova) Djoker Chisinau	Pitch 2
09:00		Report(ru)

29 May 2018	Melistar Melilla (Spain)	8–2	(Greece) AO Kefallinia	Main pitch
10:15		Report(ru)		Referee: Tomasz Winiarczyk (Poland)

30 May 2018	AO Kefallinia (Greece)	3–2	(Moldova) Djoker Chisinau	Pitch 2
09:00		Report(ru)

30 May 2018	Melistar Melilla (Spain)	4-5	(Belarus) BATE Borisov	Main pitch
10:15		Report(ru)		Referee: Moussa Bounaanaa (France)

=== Group G ===
Pos	Team	Pld	W	W+	WP	L	GF	GA	GD	Pts	Qualification
1	Sambenedettese	2	2	0	0	0	11	1	+10	6	Knockout stage
2	Dinamo Batumi	2	1	0	0	1	6	10	–4	3	Knockout stage
3	Rostocker Robben	2	0	0	0	2	4	10	–6	0	

28 May 2018	Sambenedettese (Italy)	5–0	(Germany) Rostocker Robben	Main pitch
09:00	Gonzalez 5', 11'; Jordan 29' (pen.); Junior 30'; Moran 33'	Report(ru)

29 May 2018	Dinamo Batumi (Georgia (country))	5–4	(Germany) Rostocker Robben	Main pitch
09:00	Kokoladze 8', 26'; Eduard 11'; Eliott 27', 34'	Report(ru)	5' Krotsching; 28' Dahnke; 33' Thürk; 35' Schmitt	Referee: Alberto Gomez Lameiro (Spain)

30 May 2018	Sambenedettese (Italy)	6–1	(Georgia (country)) Dinamo Batumi	Main pitch
09:00	Jordan 8'; Palma 11' di Palma 14', 17'; Moran 24', 35'	Report(ru)	31' (pen.) Frutos	Referee: Vladimir Tashkov (Bulgaria)

=== Group H (Nazaré Cup qualifiers – group 1) ===
Pos	Team	Pld	W	W+	WP	L	GF	GA	GD	Pts	Qualification
1	Kristall	3	3	0	0	0	13	7	+6	9	Knockout stage / Nazaré Cup final
2	Viareggio	3	1	1	0	1	10	9	+1	5	
3	Catania	3	0	0	1	2	11	14	–3	1	
4	Artur Music	3	0	0	0	1	6	10	–4	0	

28 May 2018	Viareggio (Italy)	4–2 (a.e.t.)	(Ukraine) Artur Music	Main pitch
14:00	Gori 9'; Ramacciotti 28'; Carpita 39'; Bryan 39'	Report(ru)	7' Nassim; 13' Stepliani	Referee: Francisco Costa (Portugal)

28 May 2018	Catania (Italy)	5–6	(Russia) Kristall	Pitch 2
15:15	Zurlo 6', 22' (pen.), 34' (pen.); Stankovic 23'; Corosiniti 30'	Report(ru)	6', 27' Romanov; 12', 16', 36' Shishin; 14' Rodrigo

29 May 2018	Catania (Italy)	3–5	(Italy) Viareggio	Pitch 2
14:00	Corosiniti 11'; Palmacci 24'; Stankovic 27'	Report(ru)	17', 34' Ramacciotti; 24', 27' Gori; 29' Bryan

29 May 2018	Artur Music (Ukraine)	1–3	(Russia) Kristall	Main pitch
15:15	Borsuk 34'	Report(ru)	5', 18', 28' Mauricinho

30 May 2018	Kristall (Russia)	4–1	(Italy) Viareggio	Main pitch
12:45	Datinha 10'; Ilinskii 20', 32'; Shishin 30'	Report(ru)	27' Gori	Referee: Sergio Soares (Portugal)

30 May 2018	Artur Music (Ukraine)	3–3 (a.e.t.) (6–7 p)	(Italy) Catania	Pitch 2
15:15	Medvid 2'; Krokhmaliuk 9'; Nassim 22'	Report(ru)	4' Palmacci; 26' Eudim; 36' Ze Lucas
	Penalties
	Rafinha (penalty scored); Nassim (penalty scored); Krokhmaliuk (penalty scored); Medvid (penalty scored); Glutskyi (penalty missed); Atamanenko (penalty scored); Borsuk (penalty scored); Sydorenko (penalty missed)		(penalty scored) Ze Lucas; (penalty scored) Zurlo; (penalty scored) Palmacci; (penalty scored) Corosiniti; (penalty missed) Eudim; (penalty scored) Stankovic; (penalty scored) Palazzolo; (penalty scored) Altobelli

=== Group I (Nazaré Cup qualifiers – group 2) ===
Pos	Team	Pld	W	W+	WP	L	GF	GA	GD	Pts	Qualification
1	Falfala Kfar Qassem	3	3	0	0	0	20	6	+14	9	Knockout stage / Nazaré Cup final
2	Casa Benfica de Loures	3	1	1	0	1	13	12	+1	5	
3	Boca Gdańsk	3	1	0	0	2	10	19	–9	3	
4	Playas de Mazarrón	3	0	0	0	3	10	16	–6	0	

28 May 2018	Casa Benfica de Loures (Portugal)	4–3	(Spain) Playas de Mazarrón	Pitch 2
12:45	Fabricio 23'; Formiga 24'; Alan 26'; Luis Vaz 35'	Report(ru)	1' Nico; 3' Alfonso; 7' Garcia

28 May 2018	Boca Gdańsk (Poland)	0–9	(Israel) Falfala Kfar Qassem	Pitch 2
14:00		Report(ru)	2', 10', 10', 14', 18' Llorenç; 4' Ozu; 13', 15' Yatim; 34' Moad

29 May 2018	Casa Benfica de Loures (Portugal)	5–4 (a.e.t.)	(Poland) Boca Gdańsk	Pitch 2
12:45	Carballo 1', 33'; Luis Vaz 5'; Alan 20', 36'	Report(ru)	15' (pen.), 24' Kucharski; 20' Baran; 22' Duarte

29 May 2018	Falfala Kfar Qassem (Israel)	6–2	(Spain) Playas de Mazarrón	Main pitch
14:00	Ozu 4', 5', 11'; Llorenç 12'; Ott 24'; Jabareen 26'	Report(ru)	12' Garcia; 14' Castillo	Referee: Lukasz Ostrowski (Poland)

30 May 2018	Playas de Mazarrón (Spain)	5–6	(Poland) Boca Gdańsk	Pitch 2
12:45	Mejías 3'; Alfonso 17', 30'; Domi 24'; Castillo 26'	Report(ru)	8', 23' Ziober; 15' Duarte; 17', 19' Lucas; 35' Bogacz

30 May 2018	Falfala Kfar Qassem (Israel)	5–4	(Portugal) Casa Benfica de Loures	Main pitch
14:00	Llorenç 5', 11', 32'; Ojeda 10' (o.g.); Yatim 32'	Report(ru)	2' Fabricio; 3', 17', 23' Carballo	Referee: Gionni Matticoli (Italy)

== Knockout stage ==
From Groups A–G of the Main Round, all seven groups winners and seven runners-up (originally, only five from seven runners-up) advance to the knockout stage (total of 14 clubs).

Originally, from Groups H and I (Nazaré Cup qualifiers groups), the winners and runners-up from both groups were to advance to the knockout stage (a total of four clubs). However the format was later revised; only the winners of each group (two clubs) now advance to play in the knockout stage. These two clubs remain separate from the other 14 in the Round of 16 draw.

In the knockout stage, the clubs compete in single-elimination matches. Consolation matches are also played to determine the final rankings involving the clubs knocked out of each round of the knockout stage.

- Round of 16 draw:

The Round of 16 draw was conducted on 30 May following the conclusion of the day's matches. The two qualifiers from the Nazaré Cup groups were automatically drawn against each other and allocated to the bottom of the bracket. The other 14 clubs were placed into two pots of seven. The group winners were placed in Pot 1 and the runners-up were placed in Pot 2.

For each Round of 16 tie, a group winner from Pot 1 was drawn to play against a runner-up from Pot 2. However, clubs from the same group could not be drawn against each other. As each tie was drawn, they were allocated chronologically from top to bottom in the bracket below. The draw was conducted by the Mayor of Nazaré, Walter Chicharro and Anastasia Osinovskaya of WFC Zvezda.

Main bracket

Round of 16
Sambenedettese	6
West Deva	1
Braga	9
Nõmme	2
Sporting CP	4
Spartak Varna	2
Lokomotiv Moscow	5
Kreiss	1
BATE Borisov	2
Dinamo Batumi	3
KP Łódź	4
Melistar Melilla	3
Vybir	2
Alanya Belediyespor	3
Nazaré Cup final
Kristall	3
Falfala Kfar Qassem	2

Quarter-finals
Sambenedettese	2
Braga	4
Sporting CP	3
Lokomotiv Moscow (a.e.t.)	4
Dinamo Batumi	5
KP Łódź	9
Alanya Belediyespor	4
Kristall	6

Semi-finals
Braga	3
Lokomotiv Moscow	1
KP Łódź	2
Kristall	3

Final
Braga (p)	3 (5)
Kristall	3 (4)
Third place
Lokomotiv Moscow	3
KP Łódź	4

Losers brackets

Round of 16 losers bracket

13th place play-off
Kreiss	5
Vybir	10
15th place play-off
Nõmme	5
BATE Borisov	8

13th–16th place semi-finals
Nõmme	3
Kreiss	6
BATE Borisov	3
Vybir (a.e.t.)	5

9th-16th place quarter-finals
West Deva	3
Nõmme	2
Spartak Varna	4
Kreiss	3
BATE Borisov	6
Melistar Melilla	7
Vybir	3
Falfala Kfar Qassem	4

9th-12th place semi-finals
West Deva	4
Spartak Varna	0
Melistar Melilla	4
Falfala Kfar Qassem	3

9th place play-off
West Deva
Melistar Melilla	w.o.
11th place play-off
Spartak Varna	2
Falfala Kfar Qassem	5

Quarter-finals losers bracket

5th–8th place semi-finals
Sambenedettese	3 (2)
Sporting CP (p)	3 (3)
Dinamo Batumi	2
Alanya Belediyespor	7

5th place play-off
Sporting CP	7
Alanya Belediyespor	4
7th place play-off
Sambenedettese	6
Dinamo Batumi	1

=== Round of 16 ===
31 May 2018
09:00

BATE Borisov (Belarus)	2–3	(Georgia (country)) Dinamo Batumi
Aksenov 6', 21'	Report(ru)	6' Shamiladze; 21' Dmais; 24' Suarez

Main pitch
Referee: Tomasz Winiarczyk (Poland)
31 May 2018
10:15

Sambenedettese (Italy)	6–1	(Romania) West Deva
di Palma 1'; Gonzalez 18', 19', 29'; Jordan 28'; Moran 32'	Report(ru)	4' Maci

Main pitch
Referee: Viktor Listratov (Russia)
31 May 2018
11:30

Vybir (Ukraine)	2–3	(Turkey) Alanya Belediyespor
Zborovskyi 1'; Kanstantsinau 17'	Report(ru)	15' Kuman; 16' Keskin; 36' Seyit

Main pitch
Referee: Francisco Costa (Portugal)
31 May 2018
12:45

Lokomotiv Moscow (Russia)	5–1	(Latvia) Kreiss
Nelito 5'; Nikonorov 16' (pen.), 35'; Lucão 18'; Krutikov 30' (pen.)	Report(ru)	2' Seņs

Main pitch
Referee: Amin Jude Utulu (Malta)
31 May 2018
14:00

KP Łódź (Poland)	4–3	(Spain) Melistar Melilla
Gac 13'; Paulinho 19', 30'; Krawczyk 30'	Report(ru)	11' Torres; 13' Biermann; 30' (pen.) Chiky

Main pitch
Referee: Sergio Soares (Portugal)
31 May 2018
15:15

Sporting CP (Portugal)	4–2	(Bulgaria) Spartak Varna
Madjer 6', 18'; Santos 8', 14'	Report(ru)	9', 21' Filipov

Main pitch
Referee: Benoit Wolff (France)
31 May 2018
17:45

Braga (Portugal)	9–2	(Estonia) Nõmme
Filipe 5'; Bokinha 7'; Botelho 12'; Sampaio 17'; Leo Martins 19'; Torres 22', 32'; Be Martins 28', 31'	Report(ru)	5' Saharov; 14' Aniko

Main pitch
Referee: Pablo Brea Peon (Spain)
Nazaré Cup final
31 May 2018
19:00

Kristall (Russia)	3–2	(Israel) Falfala Kfar Qassem
Romanov 18', 33'; Mauricinho 23'	Report(ru)	3' Ott; 17' Ozu

Main pitch
Referee: Lukasz Ostrowski (Poland)

=== Quarter-finals ===
==== 9th–16th place ====
1 June 2018
09:00

BATE Borisov (Belarus)	6–7	(Spain) Melistar Melilla
Samsonov 3', 32', 33'; Slavutsin 22'; Miranovich 26'; Aksenov 35'	Report(ru)	3' Biermann; 4', 24' Chiky; 21' Dris; 26' Sidi; 28' Torres; 36' (pen.) Voitok

Main pitch
Referee: Alfredo Pavone (Italy)
1 June 2018
14:00

West Deva (Romania)	3–2	(Estonia) Nõmme
Negara 14' (pen.); Alin 23'; Liviu 36'	Report(ru)	16' Aniko; 32' Rand

Pitch 2
Referee: Wilson Castanheira (Portugal)
1 June 2018
15:15

Kreiss (Latvia)	3–4	(Bulgaria) Spartak Varna
Galkin 9'; Novožilovs 29', 32'	Report(ru)	5', 14' Dzhambazov; 20' Filipov; 32' Tsvetkov

Pitch 2
Referee: Viktor Listratov (Russia)
1 June 2018
16:30

Vybir (Ukraine)	3–4	(Israel) Falfala Kfar Qassem
Ryabko 24'; Savich 30'; Zborovskyi 34'	Report(ru)	4' Llorenç; 10', 32' Yatim; 36' Ott

Pitch 2
Referee: Oezcan Sultanolu (Turkey)

==== 1st–8th place ====
1 June 2018
11:30

Dinamo Batumi (Georgia (country))	5–9	(Poland) KP Łódź
Kokoladze 12'; Suarez 15', 16', 19', 35'	Report(ru)	5', 9', 15', 36' Brishtel; 15' Saganowski; 19', 33' Krawczyk; 20' Gac; 24' Paulinho

Main pitch
Referee: Gionni Matticoli (Italy)
1 June 2018
14:00

Alanya Belediyespor (Turkey)	4–6	(Russia) Kristall
Ergün 1'; Yasin 3'; Muftuoglu 29'; Keskin 34'	Report(ru)	3' Mauricinho; 7' Romanov; 8' Rodrigo; 22', 24' Chuzhkov; 25' Kartashov

Main pitch
Referee: Sergio Soares (Portugal)
1 June 2018
16:30

Sporting CP (Portugal)	3–4 (a.e.t.)	(Russia) Lokomotiv Moscow
Cepeda 5'; Santos 15', 30'	Report(ru)	2', 30' Lucão; 20', 39' Nelito

Main pitch
Referee: Pablo Brea Peon (Spain)
1 June 2018
19:00

Sambenedettese (Italy)	2–4	(Portugal) Braga
Jordan 14'; Moran 36' (pen.)	Report(ru)	12', 31' Bokinha; 17' Filipe; 32' Leo Martins

Main pitch
Referee: Lukasz Ostrowski (Poland)

=== Semi-finals ===
==== 13th–16th place ====
2 June 2018
09:00

BATE Borisov (Belarus)	3–5 (a.e.t.)	(Ukraine) Vybir
Aksenov 1', 28'; Davidovich 5'	Report(ru)	9' (pen.), 27', 39' (pen.) Zborovskyi; 32', 38' Savich

Main pitch
Referee: Wilson Castanheira Soares (Portugal)
2 June 2018
16:30

Nõmme (Estonia)	3–6	(Latvia) Kreiss
Rand 8'; Mäeorg 22'; Raamat 30'	Report(ru)	3', 36' Jak; 12', 30' Galkin; 26' Stepaņuks; 34' Vasiļjevs

Pitch 2

==== 9th–12th place ====
2 June 2018
10:15

West Deva (Romania)	4–0	(Bulgaria) Spartak Varna
Fekete 6', 17'; Maci 24'; Boata 34'	Report(ru)

Main pitch
Referee: Oezcan Sultanolu (Turkey)
2 June 2018
11:30

Melistar Melilla (Spain)	4–3	(Israel) Falfala Kfar Qassem
Torres 18'; Chiky 20', 27'; Voitok 35'	Report(ru)	20', 33' Ozu; 24' Llorenç

Main pitch
Referee: Viktor Listratov (Russia)

==== 5th–8th place ====
2 June 2018
12:45

Dinamo Batumi (Georgia (country))	2–7	(Turkey) Alanya Belediyespor
Dmais 4'; Garcia 14'	Report(ru)	8', 9', 9', 15' Keskin; 9' Ergün; 12', 26' Cuman

Main pitch
Referee: Vladimir Tashkov (Bulgaria)
2 June 2018
14:00

Sambenedettese (Italy)	3–3 (a.e.t.)	(Portugal) Sporting CP
Moran 6', 25'; Jordan 19'	Report(ru)	20' Benjamin; 23' Belchior; 34' Santos
Penalties
Palma (penalty scored); Moran (penalty scored); Jordan (penalty missed)	2–3	(penalty scored) Madjer; (penalty scored) Coimbra; (penalty scored) Santos

Main pitch
Referee: Tomasz Winiarczyk (Poland)

==== 1st–4th place ====
2 June 2018
16:30

KP Łódź (Poland)	2–3	(Russia) Kristall
Kubiak 5'; Krawczyk 25'	Report(ru)	6' Paporotnyi; 23', 30' Shishin

Main pitch
2 June 2018
19:00

Braga (Portugal)	3–1	(Russia) Lokomotiv Moscow
Be Martins 6'; Bokinha 18', 30'	Report(ru)	26' Catarino

Main pitch
Referee: Gionni Matticoli (Italy)

=== Finals ===
==== 15th place match ====
3 June 2018
09:00

BATE Borisov (Belarus)	8–5	(Estonia) Nõmme
Aksenov 5', 6'; Slavutsin 8', 18', 22'; Karpau 26'; Kamzolau 31'; Samsonov 32'	Report(ru)	8' (pen.) Rand; 17' Uibo; 18' Saharov; 34' Hindrimae; 34' Palm

Main pitch
Referee: Attila Balint (Romania)

==== 13th place match ====
3 June 2018
10:15

Vybir (Ukraine)	10–5	(Latvia) Kreiss
Shchytnik 2'; Zborovskyi 4', 11', 15', 27'; Kanstantsinau 9'; Shcherystsia 9', 27'; Ryabko 35' (pen.), 35'	Report(ru)	1' Vasiļjevs; 9', 10' Jakovļevs; 21' Galkin; 23' Seņs

Main pitch
Referee: Richard De Bruijn (Netherlands)

==== 11th place match ====
3 June 2018
11:30

Spartak Varna (Bulgaria)	2–5	(Israel) Falfala Kfar Qassem
Martinov 3'; Hristov 28'	Report(ru)	12', 14', 17', 24', 33' Llorenç

Main pitch
Referee: Alfredo Pavone (Italy)

==== 9th place match ====
3 June 2018

Melistar Melilla (Spain)	10–0 w/o	(Romania) West Deva
	Report(ru)

Main pitch

==== 7th place match ====
3 June 2018
12:45

Dinamo Batumi (Georgia (country))	1–6	(Italy) Sambenedettese
Shamiladze 26'	Report(ru)	3', 9', 35' Palma; 16', 22' Ietri; 23' Perez

Main pitch
Referee: Benoit Wolff (France)

==== 5th place match ====
3 June 2018
14:00

Alanya Belediyespor (Turkey)	4–7	(Portugal) Sporting CP
Rui Mota 4'; Keskin 8', 13'; Muftuoglu 32'	Report(ru)	8', 19', 33' Benjamin Jr. 15', 21', 21', 33' Santos

Main pitch
Referee: Gionni Matticoli (Italy)

==== 3rd place match ====
3 June 2018
16:30

KP Łódź (Poland)	4–3	(Russia) Lokomotiv Moscow
Poplawski 1'; Bryshtel 16', 20'; Krawczyk 33'	Report(ru)	5' Catarino; 17', 36' Lucao

Main pitch
Referee: Sergio Soares (Portugal)

==== Championship final ====
3 June 2018
19:00

Kristall (Russia)	3–3 (a.e.t.)	(Portugal) Braga
Datinha 17'; Mauricinho 21', 26'	Report(ru)	16' Botelho; 19' Bokinha; 36' (pen.) Filipe
Penalties
Datinha (penalty scored); Romanov (penalty scored); Paporotnyi (penalty scored); Rodrigo (penalty scored); Mauricinho (penalty missed)	4–5	(penalty scored) Bokinha; (penalty scored) Filipe; (penalty scored) Be Martins; (penalty scored) Leo Martins; (penalty scored) Botelho

Main pitch
Referee: Lukasz Ostrowski (Poland)

== Awards ==
The following individual awards were presented after the final.

Top scorer(s)
(Spain) Llorenç Gómez ( (Israel) Falfala Kfar Qassem)
16 goals^{1}
Best player
(Brazil) Mauricinho ( Kristall)
Best goalkeeper
(Spain) Dona ( Braga)

1. Goals scored during the preliminary round were not counted for this award.

== Top goalscorers ==
Players who scored at least 5 goals

Goals scored in both the competition proper and the preliminary round are counted.

21 goals

- (Spain) Llorenç Gómez ( (Israel) Falfala Kfar Qassem)

15 goals

- (Russia) Vladislav Aksenov ( (Belarus) Bate Borisov)
- (Italy) Gabriele Gori ( (Italy) Viareggio)
- (Turkey) Cem Keskin ( (Turkey) Alanya Belediyespor)

13 goals

- (Germany) Christian Biermann ( (Spain) Melistar Melilla)
- (Brazil) Lucão ( (Russia) Lokomotiv)
- (Portugal) Jordan Santos ( (Portugal) Sporting)

12 goals

- (Paraguay) Carlos Carballo ( (Portugal) Casa Benfica de Loures)
- (Portugal) Leo Martins ( (Portugal) Braga)
- (Brazil) Mauricinho ( (Russia) Kristall)
- (Switzerland) Noel Ott ( (Israel) Falfala Kfar Qassem)

11 goals

- (Russia) Kirill Romanov ( (Russia) Kristall)

10 goals

- (Brazil) Bokinha ( (Portugal) Braga)
- (Ukraine) Oleg Zborovskiy ( (Ukraine) Vybir)

9 goals

- (Portugal) Alan ( (Portugal) Casa Benfica de Loures)
- (Spain) Chiky ( (Spain) Melistar)
- (Brazil) Eudin ( (Italy) Catania)
- (Israel) Amar Yatim ( (Israel) Falfala Kfar Qassem)

8 goals

- (Brazil) Bensinha ( (Portugal) Sporting)
- (Bulgaria) Filip Filipov ( (Bulgaria) Spartak Varna)
- (Romania) Maci ( (Romania) West Deva)
- (Japan) Ozu Moreira ( (Israel) Falfala Kfar Qassem)
- (Russia) Dmitry Shishin ( (Russia) Kristall)

7 goals

- (Brazil) Lucas Calmon ( (Poland) Boca Gdańsk)
- (Portugal) Fábio da Costa ( (Portugal) Leixões)
- (Netherlands) Jeffrey Klijbroek ( (Netherlands) Egmond)
- (Poland) Daniel Krawczyk ( (Poland) Lódz)
- (Paraguay) Pedro Moran ( (Italy) Sambenedettese)
- (Russia) Boris Nikonorov ( (Russia) Lokomotiv)
- (Estonia) Rando Rand ( (Estonia) Nõmme)
- (Brazil) Rodrigo ( (Russia) Kristall)
- (Brazil) Bryan Yano ( (Italy) Viareggio)
- (Brazil) Filipe ( (Portugal) Braga)

6 goals

- (Poland) Daniel Baran ( (Poland) Boca Gdańsk)
- (Italy) Francesco Corosiniti ( (Italy) Catania)
- (Brazil) Fabricio ( (Portugal) Casa Benfica de Loures)
- (Latvia) Dmitrijs Jakovlevs ( (Latvia) Kreiss)
- (Portugal) Be Martins ( (Portugal) Braga)
- (Spain) Pablo Perez ( (Italy) Sambenedettese)
- (Italy) Dario Ramachiotti ( (Italy) Viareggio)
- (Belarus) Aleh Slavutsin ( (Belarus) Bate Borisov)
- (Spain) Eduard Suarez ( (Georgia (country)) Dynamo Batumi)
- (Poland) Witold Ziober ( (Poland) Boca Gdańsk)

5 goals

- (Belarus) Ihar Bryshtel ( (Belarus) Bate Borisov)
- (France) Jeremy Bru ( (France) Marseille)
- (Portugal) Miguel Carvalho ( (Portugal) GR Amigos Paz)
- (Portugal) Marco Costa da Silva ( (Portugal) Salgueiros 08)
- (Spain) Cuman ( (Turkey) Alanya Belediyespor)
- (Portugal) Andre Goncalves ( (England) Portsmouth)
- (Switzerland) Glenn Hodl ( (Poland) Boca Gdańsk)
- (Brazil) Jordan ( (Italy) Sambenedettese)
- (Portugal) Madjer ( (Portugal) Sporting)
- (Portugal) Tiago Miguel Mateus ( (Portugal) Casa Benfica de Loures)
- (Brazil) Nelito ( (Russia) Lokomotiv)
- (Russia) Artur Paporotnyi ( (Russia) Lokomotiv)
- (Russia) Mikhail Semenov ( (Greece) APS Napoli Patron)
- (Belarus) Dzianis Samsonov ( (Belarus) Bate Borisov)
- (Switzerland) Dejan Stankovic ( (Italy) Catania)
- (Italy) Emmanuele Zurlo ( (Italy) Catania)

== Final standings ==
Rank	Team	Result
1	Braga	Champions (2nd title)
2	Kristall	Runners-up
3	KP Łódź	Third place
4	Lokomotiv Moscow	
5	Sporting CP	
6	Alanya Belediyespor	
7	Sambenedettese	
8	Dinamo Batumi	
9	Melistar Melilla	
10	West Deva	
11	Falfala Kfar Qassem	
12	Spartak Varna	
13	Vybir	
14	Kreiss	
15	BATE Borisov	
16	Nõmme	

== See also ==
- 2018 Women's Euro Winners Cup
