= Ekstraklasa (beach soccer) =

- Founded: 2012; 14 years ago
- Country: Poland
- Confederation: UEFA
- Number of clubs: 10
- Level on pyramid: 1
- Relegation to: I liga
- Domestic cup(s): Polish Cup; Polish Super Cup
- International cup: Euro Winners Cup
- Current champions: KP Łódź (4th title) (2025)
- Most championships: Grembach Łódź; KP Łódź (4 titles each)

Ekstraklasa is the top division in the Polish beach soccer league.

== History ==
Started in 2012 as the Ekstraklasa, the competitions allow teams to compete in beach soccer in a league format over the June and July. Each season ends with a superfinal deciding the competition winner for the best six teams in Polish league.

=== Tournaments ===
Season	I tournament	II tournament	Superfinal
2012	Gdynia	Darłówko	Ustka
2013	Lublin	Ustka	Ustka
2014	Puławy	Gdynia	Ustka
2015	Gdańsk	Gdynia	Ustka
2016	Gdańsk	Sosnowiec	Gdynia
2017	Gdańsk	Sosnowiec	Kołobrzeg
2018	Gdańsk	Sosnowiec	Kołobrzeg
2019	Gdańsk	Sosnowiec	Kołobrzeg
2020	Cancelled due to the COVID-19 pandemic		Gdańsk
2021	Gdańsk	Gdańsk	Gdańsk
2022	Poddębice	Gliwice	Gdańsk
2023	Gdańsk	Gdańsk	Gdańsk
2024	Gdańsk	Poddębice	Kołobrzeg
2025	Gdańsk	Gdańsk	Gdańsk

== Results ==
Season	Winner of Ekstraklasa	Champion of Poland (after superfinal)
2012	Grembach Łódź	Grembach Łódź
2013	Hemako Sztutowo	Grembach Łódź
2014	Grembach Łódź	KP Łódź
2015	Grembach Łódź	Grembach Łódź
2016	Hemako Sztutowo	Grembach Łódź
2017	KP Łódź	KP Łódź
2018	KP Łódź	Hemako Sztutowo
2019	Tonio Team Sosnowiec	KP Łódź
2020	Cancelled due to the COVID-19 pandemic	Boca Gdańsk
2021	KP Łódź	Boca Gdańsk
2022	KP Łódź	FC10 Zgierz
2023	KP Łódź	FC10 Zgierz
2024	FC10 Zgierz	FC10 Zgierz
2025	KP Łódź	KP Łódź
