= S.C. Braga (beach soccer) =

Braga - Beach Soccer
- Full name: Sporting Clube de Braga
- Nicknames: Os Arcebispos (The Archbishops); Os Arsenalistas (The Arsenalists); Os Guerreiros do Minho (The Minho Warriors)
- Short name: Braga - Beach Soccer
- Founded: 2013
- Dissolved: 2024
- Ground: Apúlia beach Esposende, Portugal
- President: António Salvador
- Head Coach: Bruno Torres
- League: Circuito Nacional de Futebol de Praia
- 2019: National Champion (6th title)
- Website: http://www.scbraga.pt/
Home colours
Away colours
Third colours

Sporting Clube de Braga is a beach soccer club based in Braga, Portugal. The team was created in 2013 and in its first season won the Portuguese National Championship.

In 2019 SC Braga won their sixth national championship, defending the titles won in the previous two seasons. They have also won the 2017, 2018, 2019 Euro Winners Cup, 2024 Euro Winners Cup.

Among its players there was 5 Portugal national beach soccer team players. In 2019 they won the Mundialito de Clubes and the first Portuguese Cup. They are currently the defending world, European, and Portuguese champions as well as leaders of the world beach soccer club ranking.

== Technical Team ==
Technical Team
	Name	Post
(Portugal)	Bruno Miguel Magalhães da Silva Torres	Head coach
(Portugal)	Diogo Macedo Correia de Barros	Assistant Coach
(Portugal)	José Miguel Gonçalves Dias	Goal-keeper's coach
(Portugal)	José Pedro Macedo Carneiro Guimarães	Manager
(Portugal)	Filipa Jácome	Physiotherapist

== Historical results ==
=== International results ===
Competition	G	W	D	L	GF	GA	Classification
2014 Euro Winners Cup	7	5	0	2	31	20	3rd place
2015 Euro Winners Cup	7	6	0	1	42	22	5th place
2016 Euro Winners Cup	8	4	2	0	51	14	3rd place
2017 Euro Winners Cup	7	7	0	0	53	18	Champion
2018 Euro Winners Cup	7	6	1	0	53	12	Champion
2019 Mundialito de Clubes	5	4	1	0	28	18	Champion
2019 Euro Winners Cup	8	8	0	0	53	10	Champion
2020 Mundialito de Clubes	5	4	0	1	33	18	Champion
2020 Euro Winners Cup	7	6	1	0	57	10	Runner-up
2021 Euro Winners Cup	8	7	0	1	59	26	Runner-up
2022 Euro Winners Cup	7	6	0	1	49	11	Runner-up
2023 Euro Winners Cup	8	6	0	2	59	20	6th place

=== National results ===
Competition	G	W	D	L	GF	GA	Classification
2013 National Championship	8	8	0	0	42	12	Champion
2014 National Championship	12	11	0	1	85	28	Champion
2015 National Championship	10	8	0	2	63	31	Champion
2016 National Championship	9	8	0	1	58	22	Runner-up
2017 National Championship	10	8	1	1	55	22	Champion
2018 National Championship	10	9	0	1	65	29	Champion
2019 National Championship	10	8	0	2	50	23	Champion
2019 National Cup	4	4	0	0	25	11	Champion
2020 National Championship	10	9	0	1	60	27	Runner-up

== Current squad ==
As of 2024 Euro Winners Cup

Note: Flags indicate national team as defined under FIFA eligibility rules; some limited exceptions apply. Players may hold more than one non-FIFA nationality.

No.	Pos.	Nation	Player
1	GK	POR	Pedro Mano
3	DF	POR	André Lourenço
5	DF	BRA	Filipe Silva
7	MF	POR	Rúben Brilhante
8	FW	BRA	Thanger Alves
10	MF	POR	Bê Martins

No.	Pos.	Nation	Player
11	FW	POR	Léo Martins
15	GK	ESP	Juanmi Mateo
16	FW	POR	Tim (Filipe Santos)
18	MF	POR	Duarte Algarvio
19	FW	BRA	Rafael Bokinha
20	FW	POR	Miguel Pintado
