= KP Łódź =

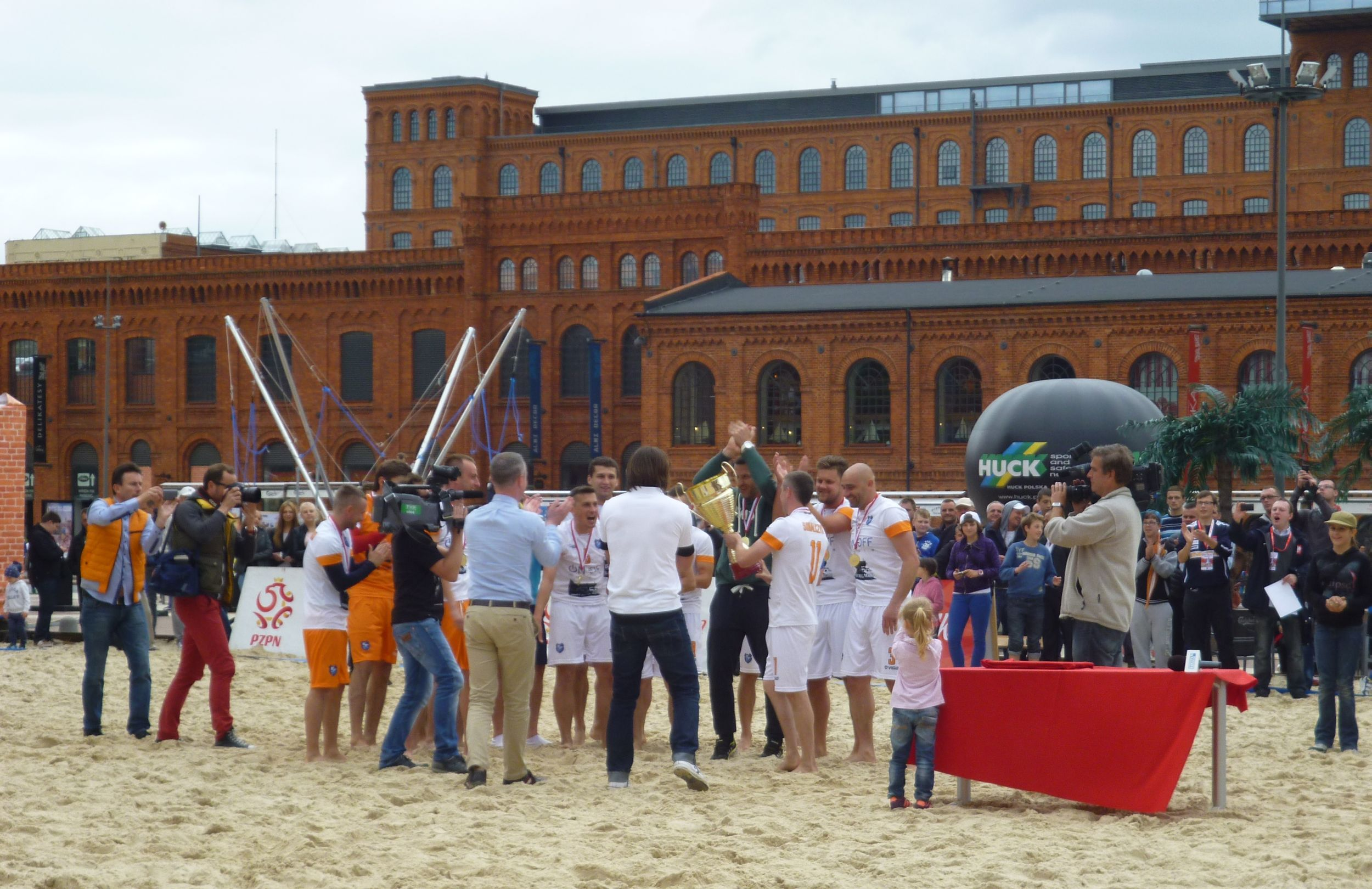
- Full name: Klub Piłkarski Łódź
- Short name: KP
- Founded: 1996
- Chairman: (Poland) Marcin Skowron
- Coach: (Poland) Marcin Stanisławski
- League: Ekstraklasa
- 2019: 2.
Home colours
Away colours

KP Łódź is a professional beach soccer team based in Łódź, Poland.

== Honours ==
=== Polish competitions ===
- Ekstraklasa

- Winners: 2014, 2017, 2019
- Runners-up: 2016

- Polish Beach Soccer Cup

- Winners: 2014, 2015, 2016, 2017, 2018

- Polish Beach Soccer Supercup

- Winners: 2014, 2017
- Runners-up: 2015

=== International competitions ===
- Euro Winners Cup

- Runners-up: 2019
- Third place: 2018
- 1/8: 2015

== 2018 Euro Winners Cup squad ==
Note: Flags indicate national team as defined under FIFA eligibility rules; some limited exceptions apply. Players may hold more than one non-FIFA nationality.

No.	Pos.	Nation	Player
1	GK	POL	Szymon Gąsiński
6		POL	Artur Popławski
7		BLR	Igor Bryshtel
8		POL	Bogusław Saganowski
9		POL	Dominik Depta
10		POL	Daniel Krawczyk

No.	Pos.	Nation	Player
11		BRA	Paulinho
12		POL	Konrad Kubiak
13		POL	Karim Madani
14		POL	Jakub Jesionowski
16	GK	POL	Dariusz Słowiński
18		POL	Filip Gac

Coach: (Poland) Marcin Stanisławski
