= Hemako Sztutowo =

- Full name: Beach Soccer Club Hemako Sztutowo
- Short name: Hemako
- Chairman: (Poland) Henryk Kuczma
- Coach: (Poland) Henryk Kuczma
- League: Ekstraklasa
- 2016: 5.
Home colours
Away colours

Omida Hemako Sztutowo has a professional beach soccer team based in Sztutowo, Poland.

== Names of the club ==
Years	Name
2005-2008	Hemako Sztutowo
2009-2012	Hotel Continental Krynica Morska
2013-2015	Hemako Sztutowo
2016-	Omida Hemako Sztutowo

== Honours ==
=== Polish competitions ===
- Ekstraklasa

- Second place: 2010, 2013, 2014, 2015
- Third place: 2009, 2012

- Polish Beach Soccer Cup

- Runner-up: 2011, 2012, 2013, 2014, 2015

- Polish Beach Soccer Supercup

- Runner-up: 2011, 2014

- Polish Beach Soccer Championships Under-21

- Winners: 2006, 2008, 2009, 2011, 2012, 2013
- Second place: 2010, 2015
- Third place: 2007, 2014

=== International competitions ===
- Euro Winners Cup

- 1/16: 2015, 2016
