= 2016 Euro Winners Cup =

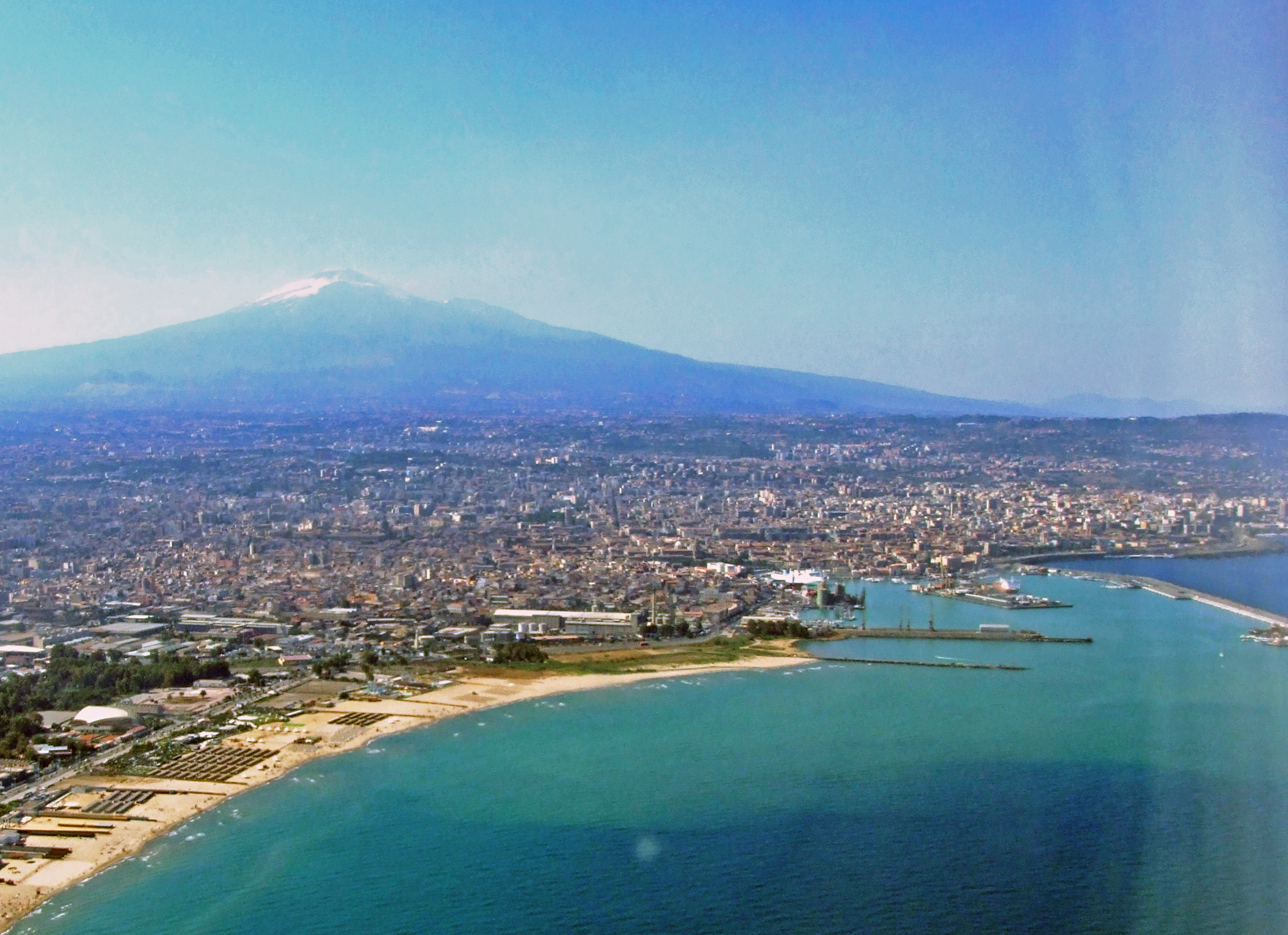
- Catania, Sicily – host of the competition

Tournament details
- Host country: Italy
- Dates: 23–29 May 2016
- Teams: 32 (from 1 confederation)
- Venues: 3 (in 1 host city)

Final positions
- Champions: (Italy) Viareggio (1st title)
- Runners-up: (Ukraine) Artur Music
- Third place: (Portugal) SC Braga
- Fourth place: (Italy) Catania

Tournament statistics
- Matches played: 64
- Goals scored: 597 (9.33 per match)
- Top scorer: (Italy) Gabriele Gori
- Best player: Rodrigo Costa

The 2016 Euro Winners Cup was the fourth edition of Euro Winners Cup, an annual continental beach soccer tournament for top European clubs, similar to that of the UEFA Champions League, held in Catania, Italy, from 23 to 29 May 2016. Russian team BSC Kristall were the defending champions.

== Participating teams ==
A record 28 nations represented by an increased total of 32 clubs participated in the tournament. Similarly to the UEFA Champions League, the higher quality leagues received more than one spot in the competition for their respective leagues' clubs to compete. The other leagues were represented solely by their champions.

Champions and Runners-up
(Italy) Terracina (1st)	(Russia) BSC Kristall (1st)	(Switzerland) Chargers Baselland (1st)
(Italy) Viareggio (2nd)	(Russia) Krylya Sovetov (2nd)	(Switzerland) Winti Panthers (2nd)
(Italy) Catania (3rd)		
Champions Only
(Belarus) FC BATE Borisov (1st)	(Belgium) Cartel Waterloo (1st)	(Bulgaria) FC Odesos (1st)
(Czech Republic) Bohemians 1905 (1st)	(Denmark) Copenhagen (1st)	(England) WKR Santos (1st)
(Estonia) ASC Peugeot (1st)	(France) Le Grand Motte (1st)	(Georgia (country)) Kakhaber Mikeladze (1st)
(Germany) Rostocker Robben E.V (1st)	(Greece) Atlas AO (1st)	(Hungary) ESC Gyöngyös (1st)
(Israel) "Falfala" Kfar Qassem (1st)	(Latvia) FK ZEP (1st)	(Lithuania) IGOL (1st)
(Moldova) Djoker Chisinau (1st)	(Netherlands) Zwolle (1st)	(Norway) Darsahan (1st)
(Poland) Grembach Łódź (1st)	(Portugal) SC Braga (1st)	(Romania) Performer Constanta (1st)
(Slovakia) Rehab (1st)	(Spain) Melistar (1st)	(Turkey) Analyaspor (1st)
(Ukraine) Artur Music (1st)		

Note: The following teams pulled out:

- (Czech Republic) Bohemians 1905
- (Norway) Darsahan
- (Slovakia) Rehab
- (Georgia (country)) Kakhaber Mikeladze

They were replaced by:

- (Russia) Lokomotiv Moscow
- (England) Portsmouth
- (Poland) Hemako Sztutowo
- (Georgia (country)) Dinamo Batumi

== Group stage ==
With an increase in the number of teams, eight groups of four teams will constitute the group stage, competing in a round-robin format. The group allocations were drawn on May 4.

=== Group A ===
Team	Pld	W	W+	L	GF	GA	+/–	Pts	Qualification
(Italy) Catania	3	3	0	0	22	5	+17	9	Knockout stage
(Belarus) FC BATE Borisov	3	2	0	1	16	9	+7	6	Knockout stage
(Greece) Atlas AO	3	1	0	2	9	15	–6	3	Elimination
(Netherlands) Zwolle	3	0	0	3	6	24	–18	0	Elimination

=== Group B ===
Team	Pld	W	W+	L	GF	GA	+/–	Pts	Qualification
(Russia) BSC Kristall	3	3	0	0	20	5	+15	9	Knockout stage
(Spain) Melistar	3	2	0	1	16	11	+5	6	Knockout stage
(France) Le Grand Motte	3	1	0	2	12	12	0	3	Elimination
(Belgium) Cartel Waterloo	3	0	0	3	6	24	–18	0	Elimination

=== Group C ===
Team	Pld	W	W+	L	GF	GA	+/–	Pts	Qualification
(Italy) Viareggio	3	3	0	0	19	9	+10	9	Knockout stage
(Russia) Krylya Sovetov	3	2	0	1	19	10	9	6	Knockout stage
(Germany) Rostocker Robben	3	0	1	2	12	17	–5	2	Elimination
(Latvia) FK ZEP	3	0	0	3	7	21	–14	0	Elimination

=== Group D ===
Team	Pld	W	W+	L	GF	GA	+/–	Pts	Qualification
(Italy) Terracina	3	3	0	0	18	10	+10	9	Knockout stage
(Israel) "Falfala" Kfar Qassem	3	2	0	1	17	9	+8	6	Knockout stage
(Bulgaria) FC Odesos	3	1	0	2	10	15	–5	3	Elimination
(Switzerland) Winti Panthers	3	0	0	3	6	17	–11	0	Elimination

=== Group E ===
Team	Pld	W	W+	L	GF	GA	+/–	Pts	Qualification
(Ukraine) Artur Music	3	2	0	1	25	8	+17	6	Knockout stage
(Poland) Hemako Sztutowo	3	2	0	1	5	6	–1	6	Knockout stage
(Estonia) BSC Peugeot	3	1	0	2	5	20	–15	3	Elimination
(Georgia (country)) Dinamo Batumi	3	1	0	2	13	14	–1	3	Elimination

=== Group F ===
Team	Pld	W	W+	L	GF	GA	+/–	Pts	Qualification
(Poland) Grembach Łódź	3	3	0	0	16	7	+9	9	Knockout stage
(Russia) Lokomotiv Moscow	3	2	0	1	22	4	+18	6	Knockout stage
(Turkey) Analyaspor	3	1	0	2	11	17	–6	3	Elimination
(Lithuania) IGOL	3	0	0	3	6	27	–21	0	Elimination

=== Group G ===
Team	Pld	W	W+	L	GF	GA	+/–	Pts	Qualification
(Portugal) SC Braga	3	3	0	0	35	2	+33	9	Knockout stage
(Moldova) CS Djoker Chisinau	3	2	0	1	11	14	–3	6	Knockout stage
(Romania) Performer Constanta	3	1	0	2	13	21	–8	3	Elimination
(England) WKR Santos	3	0	0	3	6	28	-22	0	Elimination

=== Group H ===
Team	Pld	W	W+	L	GF	GA	+/–	Pts	Qualification
(Switzerland) Chargers Baselland	3	3	0	0	34	11	+23	9	Knockout stage
(Hungary) ESC Gyöngyös	3	2	0	1	23	10	+13	6	Knockout stage
(England) Portsmouth	3	1	0	2	15	31	–16	3	Elimination
(Denmark) Copenhagen	3	0	0	3	10	30	–20	0	Elimination

== Knock-out stage ==
The top two ranking teams from each group will proceed to the knock-out stage, beginning with the round of 16. Each round will consist of a one-off match.

Round of 16
(Italy) Catania	5
(Hungary) ESC Gyöngyös	3
(Switzerland) Chargers Baselland	8
(Spain) Melistar	3
(Italy) Terracina	11
(Moldova) CS Djoker Chisinau	3
(Ukraine) Artur Music	4
(Poland) Grembach Łódź	3
(Italy) Viareggio	6
(Israel) "Falfala" Kfar Qassem	4
(Russia) Lokomotiv Moscow	3
(Poland) Hemako Sztutowo	0
(Russia) BSC Kristall	5
(Russia) Krylya Sovetov	6
(Portugal) SC Braga	5
(Belarus) FC BATE Borisov	2

Quarter-finals
(Italy) Catania	2
(Switzerland) Chargers Baselland	1
(Italy) Terracina	4
(Ukraine) Artur Music	6
(Italy) Viareggio	5
(Russia) Lokomotiv Moscow	3
(Russia) Krylya Sovetov	3(2)
(Portugal) SC Braga	3(3)

Semi-finals
(Italy) Catania	3
(Ukraine) Artur Music (et)	4
(Italy) Viareggio BS (pso)	3(5)
(Portugal) SC Braga	3(4)

Final
(Ukraine) Artur Music	6(6)
(Italy) Viareggio (pen)	6(7)
Third place
(Italy) Catania BS	4
(Portugal) SC Braga	5

== See also ==
- Mundialito de Clubes
