= 2015 Euro Winners Cup =

Tournament details
- Host country: Italy
- Dates: 2–7 June 2015
- Teams: 28 (from 1 confederation)
- Venue: 1 (in 1 host city)

Final positions
- Champions: (Russia) BSC Kristall (2nd title)
- Runners-up: (Italy) Catania BS
- Third place: (Ukraine) FC Vybir
- Fourth place: (Russia) Lokomotiv Moscow

Tournament statistics
- Matches played: 62
- Goals scored: 502 (8.1 per match)
- Top scorer: (Belarus) Brishtel (FC Vybir)
- Best player: (Brazil) Datinha

The 2015 Euro Winners Cup was the third edition of Euro Winners Cup, a beach soccer annual tournament, held in Catania, Italy, from 2–7 June 2015. The tournament brought together club champions of many domestic beach soccer leagues across Europe, almost in the same vein as the UEFA Champions League. Russian team BSC Kristall won their second straight title.

== Participating teams ==
Twenty-eight teams from 23 countries confirmed their participation in the tournament:

- (Italy) Catania BS
- (Italy) Milano BS
- (Italy) ASD Sambenedettese BS
- (Russia) Lokomotiv Moscow
- (Russia) BSC Kristall
- (Spain) CD Murcia
- (Spain) CD Bala Azul
- (Poland) KP Łódź
- (Poland) Hemako Sztutowo
- (Portugal) SC Braga
- (Ukraine) FC Vybir
- (Hungary) Goldwin Plus Bodon FC
- (Azerbaijan) Amrahbank
- (Switzerland) Sable Dancers Berna
- (Belgium) LSA Chaudfontaine
- (Belarus) FC BATE Borisov
- (Bulgaria) FC Odesos
- (Czech Republic) BS Bohemians 1905
- (England) Portsmouth BS
- BSC Peugeot Estonia
- (France) Montpellier BS
- (Georgia (country)) Dinamo Batumi
- (Germany) BST Chemnitz
- (Greece) Mani BS Club
- (Kazakhstan) Ushkyn-Iskra
- (Moldova) CS Djoker - Tornado Chișinǎu
- (Romania) AS Constanța
- (Turkey) Antalya - Alanya BSC

== Group stage ==
According to the draw realized on 22 May, 28 teams were divided into seven groups of 4 teams each. The two best-ranked sides of each group, and the best overall two third-ranked sides advanced to the round of 16.

=== Group A ===
Team	Pld	W	W+	L	GF	GA	+/–	Pts
(Italy) Catania BS	3	3	0	0	22	9	+13	9
(Spain) CD Murcia	3	2	0	1	13	12	+1	6
(Germany) BST Chemnitz	3	0	1	2	7	11	-4	2
(Czech Republic) BS Bohemians 1905	3	0	0	3	10	20	-10	0

Advances to play-off

CD Murcia (Spain)	5-4	(Germany) BST Chemnitz
BS Bohemians 1905 (Czech Republic)	6-12	(Italy) Catania BS
CD Murcia (Spain)	6-3	(Czech Republic) BS Bohemians 1905
Catania BS (Italy)	5-1	(Germany) BST Chemnitz
BST Chemnitz (Germany)	2-1 (a.p.)	(Czech Republic) BS Bohemians 1905
Catania BS (Italy)	5-2	(Spain) CD Murcia

=== Group B ===
Team	Pld	W	W+	L	GF	GA	+/–	Pts
(Russia) BSC Kristall	3	3	0	0	20	3	+17	9
(Spain) CD Bala Azul	3	1	0	2	9	10	-1	3
(Bulgaria) FC Odesos	3	1	0	2	5	12	-7	3
(Georgia (country)) Dinamo Batumi	3	1	0	2	3	18	-15	3

Advances to play-off

Dinamo Batumi (Georgia (country))	2-0	(Bulgaria) FC Odesos
CD Bala Azul (Spain)	1-5	(Russia) BSC Kristall
Dinamo Batumi (Georgia (country))	0-4	(Spain) CD Bala Azul
BSC Kristall (Russia)	6-0	(Bulgaria) FC Odesos
FC Odesos (Bulgaria)	5-4	(Spain) CD Bala Azul
BSC Kristall (Russia)	14-1	(Georgia (country)) Dinamo Batumi

=== Group C ===
Team	Pld	W	W+	L	GF	GA	+/–	Pts
(Russia) Lokomotiv Moscow	3	3	0	0	17	2	+15	9
(Azerbaijan) Amrahbank	3	1	1	1	16	18	-2	5
(Romania) AS Constanța	3	1	0	2	14	18	-4	3
(France) Montpellier BS	3	0	0	3	8	17	-9	0

Advances to play-off

Montpellier BS (France)	3-4	(Romania) AS Constanța
Amrahbank (Azerbaijan)	0-5	(Russia) Lokomotiv Moscow
Montpellier BS (France)	5-6 (pro)	(Azerbaijan) Amrahbank
Lokomotiv Moscow (Russia)	5-2	(Romania) AS Constanța
AS Constanța (Romania)	8-10	(Azerbaijan) Amrahbank
Lokomotiv Moscow (Russia)	7-0	(France) Montpellier BS

=== Group D ===
Team	Pld	W	W+	L	GF	GA	+/–	Pts
(Italy) ASD Sambenedettese BS	3	3	0	0	14	4	+10	9
(Moldova) CS Djoker - Tornado Chișinǎu	3	2	0	1	7	7	+0	6
(Kazakhstan) Ushkyn-Iskra	3	1	0	2	8	7	+1	3
(England) Portsmouth BS	3	0	0	3	2	13	-11	0

Advances to play-off

Portsmouth BS (England)	1-2	(Moldova) CS Djoker - Tornado Chișinǎu
Ushkyn-Iskra (Kazakhstan)	1-4	(Italy) ASD Sambenedettese BS
Portsmouth BS (England)	0-5	(Kazakhstan) Ushkyn-Iskra
ASD Sambenedettese BS (Italy)	4-2	(Moldova) CS Djoker - Tornado Chișinǎu
CS Djoker - Tornado Chișinǎu (Moldova)	3-2	(Kazakhstan) Ushkyn-Iskra
ASD Sambenedettese BS (Italy)	6-1	(England) Portsmouth BS

=== Group E ===
Team	Pld	W	W+	L	GF	GA	+/–	Pts
(Portugal) SC Braga	3	3	0	0	18	5	+13	9
(Poland) KP Łódź	3	2	0	1	8	8	+0	6
(Italy) Milano BS	3	1	0	2	7	10	-3	3
BSC Peugeot Estonia	3	0	0	3	3	14	-10	0

Advances to play-off

Milano BS (Italy)	2-3	(Poland) KP Łódź
BSC Peugeot Estonia	1-8	(Portugal) SC Braga
Milano BS (Italy)	4-2	BSC Peugeot Estonia
SC Braga (Portugal)	5-3	(Poland) KP Łódź
KP Łódź (Poland)	2-1	BSC Peugeot Estonia
SC Braga (Portugal)	5-1	(Italy) Milano BS

=== Group F ===
Team	Pld	W	W+	L	GF	GA	+/–	Pts
(Switzerland) Sable Dancers Berna	3	3	0	0	22	15	+7	9
(Turkey) Antalya - Alanya BSC	3	2	0	1	30	13	+17	6
(Poland) Hemako Sztutowo	3	1	0	2	10	18	-8	3
(Greece) Mani BS Club	3	0	0	3	9	25	-16	0

Advances to play-off

Antalya - Alanya BSC (Turkey)	10-4	(Poland) Hemako Sztutowo
Mani BS Club (Greece)	6-8	(Switzerland) Sable Dancers Berna
Antalya - Alanya BSC (Turkey)	14-2	(Greece) Mani BS Club
Sable Dancers Berna (Switzerland)	7-3	(Poland) Hemako Sztutowo
Hemako Sztutowo (Poland)	3-1	(Greece) Mani BS Club
Sable Dancers Berna (Switzerland)	7-6	(Turkey) Antalya - Alanya BSC

=== Group G ===
Team	Pld	W	W+	L	GF	GA	+/–	Pts
(Hungary) Goldwin Plus Bodon FC	3	3	0	0	22	18	+14	9
(Ukraine) FC Vybir	3	2	0	1	17	10	+7	6
(Belarus) FC BATE Borisov	3	1	0	2	7	11	-4	3
(Belgium) LSA Chaudfontaine	3	0	0	3	10	27	-17	0

Advances to play-off

LSA Chaudfontaine (Belgium)	4-12	(Hungary) Goldwin Plus Bodon FC
FC BATE Borisov (Belarus)	2-3	(Ukraine) FC Vybir
LSA Chaudfontaine (Belgium)	3-4	(Belarus) FC BATE Borisov
FC Vybir (Ukraine)	3-5	(Hungary) Goldwin Plus Bodon FC
Goldwin Plus Bodon FC (Hungary)	5-1	(Belarus) FC BATE Borisov
FC Vybir (Ukraine)	11-3	(Belgium) LSA Chaudfontaine

== Play-off ==
=== Bracket ===
First round
(Russia) BSC Kristall	4
(Kazakhstan) Ushkyn-Iskra	2
(Hungary) Goldwin Plus Bodon FC	5 (pro)
(Spain) CD Murcia	4 (pro)
(Russia) Lokomotiv Moscow	6
(Moldova) CS Djoker - Tornado Chișinǎu	3
(Switzerland) Sable Dancers Berna	4
(Poland) KP Łódź	6
(Italy) ASD Sambenedettese BS	5
(Ukraine) FC Vybir	6
(Portugal) SC Braga	4
(Turkey) Antalya - Alanya BSC	2
(Italy) Catania BS	2
(Italy) Milano BS	1
(Spain) CD Bala Azul	5
(Azerbaijan) Amrahbank	9

Quarter-finals
(Russia) BSC Kristall	9
(Hungary) Goldwin Plus Bodon FC	1
(Russia) Lokomotiv Moscow	5
(Poland) KP Łódź	2
(Ukraine) FC Vybir	9
(Portugal) SC Braga	7
(Italy) Catania BS	3
(Azerbaijan) Amrahbank	2

Semi-finals
(Russia) BSC Kristall	3
(Russia) Lokomotiv Moscow	3
(Ukraine) FC Vybir	2
(Italy) Catania BS	6

Final
(Russia) BSC Kristall	6
(Italy) Catania BS	2
Third place
(Russia) Lokomotiv Moscow	2 (pro)
(Ukraine) FC Vybir	3 (pro)

=== 5th–8th places ===
qualifying stage
(Hungary) Goldwin Plus Bodon FC	2
(Poland) KP Łódź	1
(Portugal) SC Braga	4
(Azerbaijan) Amrahbank	3

5th place
(Hungary) Goldwin Plus Bodon FC	3
(Portugal) SC Braga	9
7th place
(Poland) KP Łódź	4
(Azerbaijan) Amrahbank	5

== Winners ==
Euro Winners Cup
2015 Winners:

BSC Kristall
Second title

== Awards ==
Best Player (MVP)
(Brazil) Datinha ( (Russia) BSC Kristall)
Top Scorer
(Belarus) Brishtel ( (Ukraine) FC Vybir)
Best Goalkeeper
(Italy) Del Mestre ( (Italy) Catania BS)

== Final standings ==
Rank	Team
1	(Russia) BSC BSC Kristall
2	(Italy) BS Catania
3	(Ukraine) FC Vybir
4	(Russia) Lokomotiv Moscow
5	(Portugal) SC Braga
6	(Hungary) Goldwin Plus Bodon FC
7	(Azerbaijan) Amrahbank
8	(Poland) KP Łódź

== See also ==
- Beach soccer
- Beach Soccer Worldwide
