= 2013 Euro Winners Cup =

Tournament details
- Host country: Italy
- Dates: 15 – 19 May 2013
- Teams: 20 (from 1 confederation)
- Venue: 1 (in 1 host city)

Final positions
- Champions: (Russia) Lokomotiv Moscow (1st title)
- Runners-up: (Ukraine) Griffin Kyiv
- Third place: (Turkey) Beşiktaş JK
- Fourth place: (Switzerland) Grasshoppers Club Zurich

Tournament statistics
- Matches played: 42
- Goals scored: 389 (9.26 per match)
- Top scorer: (Switzerland) Dejan Stankovic (13 goals)
- Best player: (Russia) Egor Shaykov

The inaugural 2013 Euro Winners Cup was a beach soccer tournament that took place on two pitches at the UMPI Smart Beach Arena stadium, located at the Riviera delle Palme resort in San Benedetto del Tronto, Italy, from 15 – 19 May 2013. The tournament brought together club champions of many domestic beach soccer leagues across Europe, almost in the same vein as the UEFA Champions League.

== Participating teams ==
Twenty teams confirmed their participation in the inaugural tournament:

- (Azerbaijan) Baku FC
- (Belarus) FC BATE Borisov
- (England) Sandown Sociedad
- (France) SC Montredon Bonneveine
- (Greece) AO Kefallinia
- (Hungary) Goldwin Pluss
- (Israel) "Falfala" Kfar Qassem
- (Italy) ASD Terracina BS
- (Italy) Sambenedettese BS
- (Italy) Viareggio BS
- (Latvia) Kreiss Riga
- (Moldova) Lexmax
- (Netherlands) Beach Soccer Egmond
- (Poland) Grembach Łódź
- (Portugal) CF Os Belenenses
- (Russia) Lokomotiv Moscow
- (Spain) Gimnàstic de Tarragona
- (Switzerland) Grasshopper Club Zurich
- (Turkey) Beşiktaş JK
- (Ukraine) Griffin Kyiv

== Format and draw ==
The first Beach Soccer Winner Cup was held in the sands of San Benedetto del Tronto, Rive delle Palme located in Ascoli, Italy from 15–19 May 2013. This Cup is involving all the champions in the different official National Leagues all across the Old Continent, 18 different countries will be represented in this tournament.

In the first stage, the eighteen champions of the officially sanctioned Beach Soccer National Championships, plus the host and the Italian runner-up got distributed into five groups with teams having to compete for the head of the group.

Only the sides topping the group will be granted a ticket to the quarterfinals stage, accompanied by the three best second-ranked teams.

GROUP A	GROUP B	GROUP C	Group D	Group E
(Italy) Sambenedettese BS	(Moldova) Lexmax	(Hungary) Goldwin Pluss	(Ukraine) Griffin	(Italy) ASD Terracina BS
(Israel) "Falfala" Kfar Qassem	(Portugal) CF Os Belenenses	(Greece) AO Kefallinia	(Italy) Viareggio BS	(Poland) Grembach Łódź
(Russia) Lokomotiv Moscow	(France) SC Montredon Bonneveine	(Belarus) Bate Borisov	(Switzerland) Grasshopper Club Zurich	(Latvia) Kreiss
(Spain) Gimnàstic de Tarragona	(Turkey) Besiktas JK	(Netherlands) Beach Soccer Egmond	(England) Sandown Sociedad	(Azerbaijan) Baku FC

== Stadium ==
The stadium that was used is called the UMPI Smart Beach Arena. The new state-of-the-art facility is intended to maximize the technology and the environmental consciousness directives to create a stadium that offers 360-degree amusement possibilities both for citizens and tourists.

== Online ==
Due to the facility not having satellite capabilities, the tournament was not streamed online by BSWW.

== Rosters ==
The complete rosters for all participating teams can be found on the BSWW web site.

== Group stage ==
The draw to divide the teams into five groups of four was conducted on 19 April 2013.

All kickoff times are of local time in San Benedetto del Tronto, (UTC+1).

=== Group A ===
Team	Pld	W	W+	L	GF	GA	+/-	Pts
(Russia) Lokomotiv Moscow	3	3	0	0	18	7	+11	9
(Italy) Sambenedettese BS	3	1	0	2	16	14	+3	3
(Spain) Gimnàstic de Tarragona	3	0	1	2	11	17	–6	2
(Israel) "Falfala" Kfar Qassem	3	0	1	2	10	17	–7	2

Clinched quarterfinal berth

15 May 2013
17:15

"Falfala" Kfar Qassem (Israel)	1 – 8	(Russia) Lokomotiv Moscow
D. Dos Santos 19'	Report	1' I. Leonov; 3', 17' E. Shaykov; 15', 35' N. Belchior; 28' Madjer; 30', 31' D. Shishin

Pitch 1, UMPI Smart Beach Arena, San Benedetto del Tronto

15 May 2013
18:30

Gimnàstic de Tarragona (Spain)	4 – 8	(Italy) Sambenedettese BS
A. Frutos 2', 8', 17'; J. Pares 10'	Report	4', 5', 26' G. Soria; 5' N. Tavares; 16', 17' A. Ietri; 20' B. Novo; 21' L. Carmo

Pitch 1, UMPI Smart Beach Arena, San Benedetto del Tronto

16 May 2013
17:15

Lokomotiv Moscow (Russia)	5 – 2	(Spain) Gimnàstic de Tarragona
A. Makarov 2', 5'; Y. Gorchinskiy 16'; E. Shaykov 25', 26'	Report	8' A. Nunez; 35' A. Frutos

Pitch 1, UMPI Smart Beach Arena, San Benedetto del Tronto

16 May 2013
18:30

Sambenedettese BS (Italy)	4 – 4 (a.e.t.)	(Israel) "Falfala" Kfar Qassem
F. Palma 3'; L. Carmo 11', 32'; A. Tomeo 29'	Report	18', 21', 24' D. Dos Santos; 31' A. Yatim
Penalties
G. Soria (penalty scored); F. Palma (penalty scored); B. Novo (penalty scored); N. Tavares (penalty missed)	3 – 4	(penalty scored) A. Yatim; (penalty scored) D. Souza; (penalty scored) M. Sarsur; (penalty scored) R. Badir

Pitch 1, UMPI Smart Beach Arena, San Benedetto del Tronto

17 May 2013
17:15

"Falfala" Kfar Qassem (Israel)	4 – 4 (a.e.t.)	(Spain) Gimnàstic de Tarragona
A. Salook 14'; D. Souza 25', 37'; R. Badir 28'	Report	20', 38' J. Pares; 30', 36' A. Frutos
Penalties
M. Sarsur (penalty missed)	0 – 1	(penalty scored) D. Morros

Pitch 1, UMPI Smart Beach Arena, San Benedetto del Tronto

17 May 2013
18:30

Sambenedettese BS (Italy)	4 – 5	(Russia) Lokomotiv Moscow
N. Tavares 25'; E. Shaykov 33' (o.g.); G. Soria 35', 36'	Report	3', 14' A. Makarov; 8', 10' A. Shkarin; 20' E. Shaykov

Pitch 1, UMPI Smart Beach Arena, San Benedetto del Tronto

=== Group B ===
Team	Pld	W	W+	L	GF	GA	+/-	Pts
(Turkey) Beşiktaş JK	3	3	0	0	20	9	+11	9
(Portugal) CF Os Belenenses	3	2	0	1	18	15	+3	6
(France) SC Montredon Bonneveine	3	1	0	2	13	21	–8	3
(Moldova) Lexmax	3	0	0	3	14	20	–6	0

Clinched quarterfinal berth

15 May 2013
12:15

Beşiktaş JK (Turkey)	5 – 4	(Moldova) Lexmax
O. Zayim 1'; B. Terzioglu 18', 32'; L. Koswal 29'; M. Telle 31'	Report	5', 36' A. Negara; 24' A. Capsamun; 32' V. Lungu

Pitch 1, UMPI Smart Beach Arena, San Benedetto del Tronto

15 May 2013
12:15

CF Os Belenenses (Portugal)	6 – 5	(France) SC Montredon Bonneveine
S. Meier 12', 16', 18'; J. Santos 14', 36'; R. Coimbra 27'	Report	2', 21', 27' F. Marques; 4' J. Bru; 26' F. Gnepo

Pitch 2, UMPI Smart Beach Arena, San Benedetto del Tronto

16 May 2013
12:15

CF Os Belenenses (Portugal)	3 – 5	(Turkey) Beşiktaş JK
J. Santos 6'; S. Meier 23', 36'	Report	5' L. Koswal; 12' B. Terzioglu; 19' Tamer Ay; 23' M. Telle; 35' (o.g.) M. Tavares

Pitch 1, UMPI Smart Beach Arena, San Benedetto del Tronto

16 May 2013
12:15

Lexmax (Moldova)	5 – 6	(France) SC Montredon Bonneveine
A. Negara 5', 23', 25' 35'; A. Vicolas 29'	Report	4', 20' B. De Santi; 5', 31' A. Mahraoui; 8' L. Barroso; 25' F. Marques

Pitch 2, UMPI Smart Beach Arena, San Benedetto del Tronto

17 May 2013
12:15

SC Montredon Bonneveine (France)	2 – 10	(Turkey) Beşiktaş JK
D. Quaziz 20'; B. De Santi 34'	Report	4', 26' B. Terzioglu; 8' M. Telle; 9', 9' O. Zayim; 10' L. Koswal; 29', 30', 35' A. Sezer; 36' Tamer Ay

Pitch 1, UMPI Smart Beach Arena, San Benedetto del Tronto

17 May 2013
12:15

Lexmax (Moldova)	5 – 9	(Portugal) CF Os Belenenses
A. Vicolas 23'; R. Miron 25'; A. Negara 25', 30', 32'	Report	1' R. Coimbra; 2', 36' J. Maria; 25' M. Tavares; 6' (o.g.) V. Lungu; 7', 19' J. Santos; 17' S. Santana; 24' S. Meier

Pitch 2, UMPI Smart Beach Arena, San Benedetto del Tronto

=== Group C ===
Team	Pld	W	W+	L	GF	GA	+/-	Pts
(Belarus) FC BATE Borisov	3	2	0	1	15	7	+8	6
(Hungary) Goldwin Pluss	3	2	0	1	15	10	+5	6
(Greece) AO Kefallinia	3	2	0	1	9	10	–1	6
(Netherlands) Beach Soccer Egmond	3	0	0	3	6	18	–12	0

Clinched quarterfinal berth	Clinched wild card berth

15 May 2013
11:00

AO Kefallinia (Greece)	3 – 2	(Belarus) FC BATE Borisov
C. Salapatas 2'; Paris 12'; T. Triantafyllidis 24'	Report	10', 14' O. Romrig

Pitch 1, UMPI Smart Beach Arena, San Benedetto del Tronto

15 May 2013
11:00

Beach Soccer Egmond (Netherlands)	4 – 5	(Hungary) Goldwin Pluss
K. Wijker 23', 28'; J. Groot 25'; T. Ruder 26'	Report	5' Z. Szalanczi; 6' (o.g.) S. Duindam; 23' A. Angyalos; 29' T. Fekete; 36' V. Fekete

Pitch 2, UMPI Smart Beach Arena, San Benedetto del Tronto

16 May 2013
11:00

Goldwin Pluss (Hungary)	3 – 4	(Belarus) FC BATE Borisov
M. Ughy 2'; V. Fekete 14'; T. Fekete 32'	Report	15' R. Pernai; 23' A. Davidovich; 35' R. Zhechko; 35' O. Romrig

Pitch 1, UMPI Smart Beach Arena, San Benedetto del Tronto

16 May 2013
11:00

AO Kefallinia (Greece)	4 – 1	(Netherlands) Beach Soccer Egmond
S. Amanatidis 14', 16'; K. Papastathopoulos 36'; D. Nikolau 36'	Report	18' W. Peereboom

Pitch 2, UMPI Smart Beach Arena, San Benedetto del Tronto

17 May 2013
11:00

FC BATE Borisov (Belarus)	9 – 1	(Netherlands) Beach Soccer Egmond
Y. Haiduk 7'; O. Romrig 13', 25'; I. Miranovich 16', 30'; K. Yakubovsky 17', 28'; A. Bogaichuk 29'; R. Zhechko 35'	Report	35' T. Ruder

Pitch 1, UMPI Smart Beach Arena, San Benedetto del Tronto

17 May 2013
11:00

Goldwin Pluss (Hungary)	7 – 2	(Greece) AO Kefallinia
A. Karim 10'; Z. Szalanczi 16'; D. Vernyik 21'; V. Fekete 25'; F. Besenyei 28', 35'; T. Fekete 32'	Report	6' Paris; 36' V. Plexidas

Pitch 2, UMPI Smart Beach Arena, San Benedetto del Tronto

=== Group D ===
Team	Pld	W	W+	L	GF	GA	+/-	Pts
(Switzerland) Grasshoppers Club Zurich	3	2	1	0	26	18	+8	8
(Ukraine) Griffin Kyiv	3	2	0	1	24	17	+7	6
(Italy) Viareggio BS	3	1	0	2	17	14	+3	3
(England) Sandown Sociedad	3	0	0	3	13	31	–18	0

Clinched quarterfinal berth	Clinched wild card berth

15 May 2013
13:30

Viareggio BS (Italy)	5 – 7	(Switzerland) Grasshoppers Club Zurich
G. Valenti 9', 14'; G. Gori 12', 30', 31'	Report	14' J. Osso; 21', 28' D. Stankovic; 22', 31' Nico; 22' R. Amarelle; 30' A. Hoppler

Pitch 1, UMPI Smart Beach Arena, San Benedetto del Tronto

15 May 2013
13:30

Sandown Sociedad (England)	5 – 12	(Ukraine) Griffin Kyiv
A. Borsuk 10' (o.g.); L. Kerr 3', 33'; J. Morris 7'; G. Giancovich 31'	Report	1', 30' I. Borsuk; 3', 28', 28' E. Eremeev; 5', 11', 24' A. Borsuk; 5' O. Mahda; 9', 23' V. Panteleichuk; 35' A. Illichov

Pitch 2, UMPI Smart Beach Arena, San Benedetto del Tronto

16 May 2013
13:30

Griffin Kyiv (Ukraine)	6 – 6 (a.e.t.)	(Switzerland) Grasshoppers Club Zurich
I. Borsuk 1', 32'; A. Borsuk 3', 25'; V. Bakumenko 22'; E. Eremeev 12'	Report	3' S. Spaccarotella; 11', 21', 22', 27' D. Stankovic; 19' Nico
Penalties
V. Bakumenko (penalty missed)	0 – 1	(penalty scored) D. Stankovic

Pitch 1, UMPI Smart Beach Arena, San Benedetto del Tronto

16 May 2013
13:30

Viareggio BS (Italy)	7 – 1	(England) Sandown Sociedad
D. Ramaciotti 2'; G. Gori 9', 14', 20', 23', 24'; M. Di Palma 21'	Report	23' M. Corbett

Pitch 2, UMPI Smart Beach Arena, San Benedetto del Tronto

17 May 2013
13:30

Griffin Kyiv (Ukraine)	6 – 5	(Italy) Viareggio BS
E. Eremeev 8'; A. Borsuk 12', 17'; V. Panteleichuk 13', 36'; I. Borsuk 17'	Report	2', 23' G. Valenti; 17' D. Ramaciotti; 22' G. Gori; 36' M. Di Palma

Pitch 1, UMPI Smart Beach Arena, San Benedetto del Tronto

17 May 2013
13:30

Grasshoppers Club Zurich (Switzerland)	12 – 7	(England) Sandown Sociedad
R. Amarelle 10', 21'; D. Stankovic 11', 26', 28'; Nico 14', 23', 24'; S. Spaccarotella 25', 29'; A. Salpeter 33', 35'	Report	3', 19', 21' J. Morris; 8' L. Collins; 15', 17' M. Corbett; 24' G. Giancovich

Pitch 2, UMPI Smart Beach Arena, San Benedetto del Tronto

=== Group E ===
Team	Pld	W	W+	L	GF	GA	+/-	Pts
(Poland) Grembach Łódź	3	3	0	0	12	6	+6	9
(Italy) ASD Terracina BS	3	2	0	1	14	9	+5	6
(Azerbaijan) Baku FC	3	0	1	2	7	9	–2	2
(Latvia) Kreiss	3	0	0	3	8	17	–9	0

Clinched quarterfinal berth	Clinched wild card berth

15 May 2013
14:45

Grembach Łódź (Poland)	5 – 1	(Latvia) Kreiss
W. Ziober 1', 36'; B. Saganowski 14', 35'; P. Golanski 36'	Report	16' E. Rubenis

Pitch 1, UMPI Smart Beach Arena, San Benedetto del Tronto

15 May 2013
16:00

Baku FC (Azerbaijan)	1 – 3	(Italy) ASD Terracina BS
R. Aliyev 24'	Report	18', 22', 27' L. Gomez

Pitch 1, UMPI Smart Beach Arena, San Benedetto del Tronto

16 May 2013
14:45

Baku FC (Azerbaijan)	1 – 2	(Poland) Grembach Łódź
R. Aliyev 33'	Report	25' B. Saganowski; 25' W. Ziober

Pitch 1, UMPI Smart Beach Arena, San Benedetto del Tronto

16 May 2013
16:00

ASD Terracina BS (Italy)	7 – 3	(Latvia) Kreiss
S. Feudi 6', 33'; L. Gomez 17', 17', 32'; A. Frainetti 18'; F. Corosiniti 25'	Report	3' E. Rubenis; 32' S. Vasiļjevs; 35' D. Jakovļevs

Pitch 1, UMPI Smart Beach Arena, San Benedetto del Tronto

17 May 2013
14:45

Kreiss (Latvia)	4 – 5 (a.e.t.)	(Azerbaijan) Baku FC
D. Travkins 16'; D. Jakovļevs 33', 36'; S. Vasiļjevs 35'	Report	2' V. Shirinbayov; 6', 13' R. Aliyev; 34', 38' A. Aliyev

Pitch 1, UMPI Smart Beach Arena, San Benedetto del Tronto

17 May 2013
16:00

ASD Terracina BS (Italy)	4 – 5	(Poland) Grembach Łódź
F. Corosiniti 21'; L. Gomez 22'; M. Olleia 23'; A. Frainetti 30'	Report	5' R. Mordon; 13' B. Saganowski; 17' M. Widzicki; 26' W. Ziober; 31' M. Olejniczak

Pitch 1, UMPI Smart Beach Arena, San Benedetto del Tronto

== Knockout stage ==
A draw will be held after the group stage matches were completed to determine the quarterfinal pairings.

Quarter-finals
18 May 2013
(Switzerland) Grasshoppers Club Zurich	10
(Hungary) Goldwin Pluss	9
18 May 2013
(Poland) Grembach Łódź	4
(Ukraine) Griffin Kyiv	5
18 May 2013
(Turkey) Beşiktaş JK (a.e.t.)	4 (1)
(Belarus) FC BATE Borisov	4 (0)
18 May 2013
(Russia) Lokomotiv Moscow	6
(Italy) ASD Terracina BS	0

Semi-finals
18 May 2013
(Switzerland) Grasshoppers Club Zurich	4
(Ukraine) Griffin Kyiv	5
18 May 2013
(Turkey) Beşiktaş JK	4 (2)
(Russia) Lokomotiv Moscow (a.e.t.)	4 (3)

Final
19 May 2013
(Ukraine) Griffin Kyiv	0
(Russia) Lokomotiv Moscow	3
Third place
19 May 2013
(Switzerland) Grasshoppers Club Zurich	1
(Turkey) Beşiktaş JK	3

=== Quarterfinals ===
18 May 2013
09:00

Grasshoppers Club Zurich (Switzerland)	10 – 9	(Hungary) Goldwin Pluss
R. Amarelle 3', 35'; S. Spaccarotella 5', 34'; D. Stankovic 10', 26', 27'; J. Osso 20'; Nico 24', 31'	Report	6', 12', 25' M. Ughy; 7' A. Karim; 8', 31' T. Fekete; 12' F. Besenyei; 27' A. Angyalos; 30' D. Vernyik

Pitch 1, UMPI Smart Beach Arena, San Benedetto del Tronto

18 May 2013
10:15

Grembach Łódź (Poland)	4 – 5	(Ukraine) Griffin Kyiv
P. Golanski 9'; W. Ziober 21'; T. Wydmuszek 24'; B. Saganowski 35'	Report	5' S. Romanovskyi; 10' V. Panteleichuk; 11', 21' A. Borsuk; 24' E. Eremeev

Pitch 1, UMPI Smart Beach Arena, San Benedetto del Tronto

18 May 2013
11:30

Beşiktaş JK (Turkey)	4 – 4 (a.e.t.)	(Belarus) FC BATE Borisov
A. Sezer 18'; B. Terzioglu 23'; L. Koswal 24'; O. Zayim 24'	Report	3' O. Romrig; 12', 28' I. Miranovich; 36' R. Pernai
Penalties
O. Zayim (penalty scored)	1 – 0	(penalty missed) R. Pernai

Pitch 1, UMPI Smart Beach Arena, San Benedetto del Tronto

18 May 2013
12:45

Lokomotiv Moscow (Russia)	6 – 0	(Italy) ASD Terracina BS
E. Shaykov 2'; A. Shkarin 8'; D. Shishin 10', 11', 26'; Y. Gorchinskiy 16'	Report

Pitch 1, UMPI Smart Beach Arena, San Benedetto del Tronto

=== Fifth-place Semifinals ===
18 May 2013
17:45

Goldwin Pluss (Hungary)	4 – 6	(Poland) Grembach Łódź
M. Ughy 2', 7', 28'; V. Fekete 29'	Report	2' P. Golanski; 12' T. Wydmuszek; 13' B. Saganowski; 19' W. Ziober; 23', 35' D. Baran

Pitch 2, UMPI Smart Beach Arena, San Benedetto del Tronto

18 May 2013
19:00

FC BATE Borisov (Belarus)	2 – 4	(Italy) ASD Terracina BS
R. Pernai 1'; A. Bogaichuk 27'	Report	9', 22', 36' L. Gomez; 19' M. Olleia

Pitch 2, UMPI Smart Beach Arena, San Benedetto del Tronto

=== Championship Semifinals ===
18 May 2013
17:45

Grasshoppers Club Zurich (Switzerland)	4 – 5	(Ukraine) Griffin Kyiv
D. Stankovic 20'; A. Hoppler 27'; R. Amarelle 28'; Nico 32'	Report	2', 9', 31' E. Eremeev; 6' A. Borsuk; 20' O. Mahda

Pitch 1, UMPI Smart Beach Arena, San Benedetto del Tronto

18 May 2013
19:00

Beşiktaş JK (Turkey)	4 – 4 (a.e.t.)	(Russia) Lokomotiv Moscow
B. Terzioglu 4', 9', 26'; L. Koswal 8'	Report	1', 26' A. Makarov; 12' Madjer; 15' N. Belchior
Penalties
O. Zayim (penalty scored); A. Sezer (penalty scored); B. Torres (penalty missed)	2 – 3	(penalty scored) Madjer; (penalty scored) N, Belchior; (penalty scored) D. Shishin

Pitch 1, UMPI Smart Beach Arena, San Benedetto del Tronto

=== Seventh-place final ===
19 May 2013
14:45

Goldwin Pluss (Hungary)	0 – 5	(Belarus) FC BATE Borisov
	Report	11', 34' A. Bogaichuk; 20' K. Yakubovsky; 28' R. Pernai; 33' R. Zhechko

Pitch 1, UMPI Smart Beach Arena, San Benedetto del Tronto

=== Fifth-place final ===
19 May 2013
16:00

Grembach Łódź (Poland)	3 – 6	(Italy) ASD Terracina BS
D. Baran 4', 36'; R. Mordon 21'	Report	15' S. Spada; 28' M. Olleia; 31' F. Corosiniti; 15' A. Frainetti; 35' S. Feudi; 36' L. Gomez

Pitch 1, UMPI Smart Beach Arena, San Benedetto del Tronto

=== Third-place final ===
19 May 2013
17:15

Grasshoppers Club Zurich (Switzerland)	1 – 3	(Turkey) Beşiktaş JK
M. Day 36'	Report	18' B. Torres; 23', 36' A. Sezer

Pitch 1, UMPI Smart Beach Arena, San Benedetto del Tronto

=== Championship final ===
19 May 2013
18:30

Griffin Kyiv (Ukraine)	0 – 3	(Russia) Lokomotiv Moscow
	Report	10' E. Shaykov; 19' A. Makarov; 36' N. Belchior

Pitch 1, UMPI Smart Beach Arena, San Benedetto del Tronto

== Winners ==
Euro Winners Cup
2013 Winners:

FC Lokomotiv Moscow (beach soccer)
First title

== Awards ==
Best Player (MVP)
(Russia) Egor Shaykov ( (Russia) Lokomotiv Moscow)
Top Scorer
(Switzerland) Dejan Stankovic ( (Switzerland) Grasshoppers Club Zurich)
13 goals
Best Goalkeeper
(Ukraine) Vitali Sydorenko ( (Ukraine) Griffin Kyiv)

== Final standings ==
Rank	Team
1	(Russia) Lokomotiv Moscow
2	(Ukraine) Griffin
3	(Turkey) Besiktas JK
4	(Switzerland) Grasshopper Club Zurich
5	(Italy) ASD Terracina BS
6	(Poland) Grembach Łódź
7	(Belarus) Bate Borisov
8	(Hungary) Goldwin Pluss

== See also ==
- Beach soccer
- Beach Soccer Worldwide
