= 2024 Euro Winners Challenge =

2025 Euro Winners Challenge
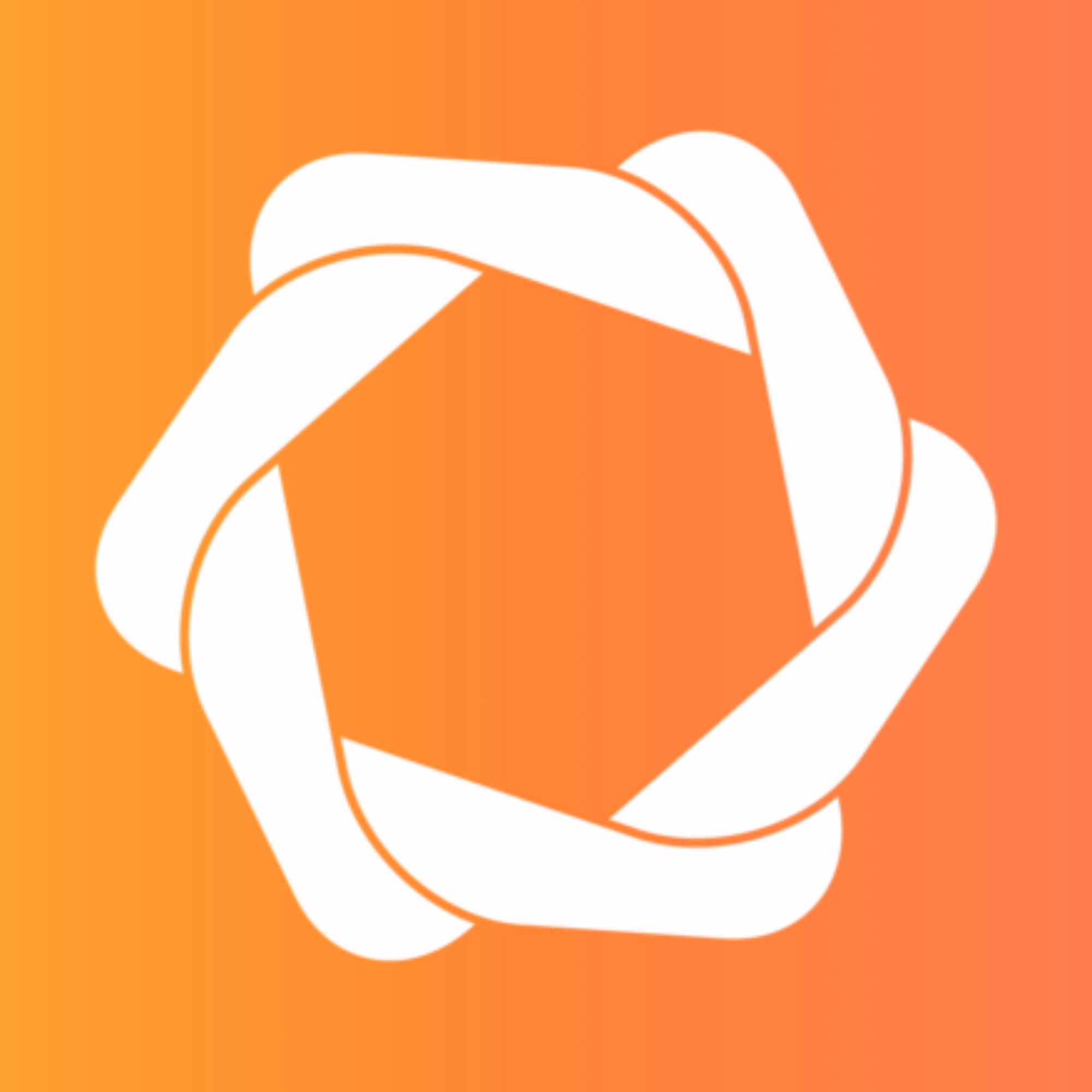

Tournament details
- Cities: Nazaré, Portugal, Portugal
- Dates: June 7, 2025– June 13, 2025
- Teams: 20

Final positions
- Champions: (Portugal) Leixões S.C. (1st title)
- Runners-up: (Portugal) G.D. Sesimbra
- Third place: (Spain) Vila Flor SC
- Fourth place: (Portugal) GDU Ericeirense

Tournament statistics
- Matches played: 44
- Goals scored: 361 (8.2 per match)
- Top scorer(s): (Portugal) Matheus Nascimento; 12 goals (Leixões S.C.)
- Best player: (Brazil) Pedrinho (Leixões S.C.)
- Best goalkeeper: (Portugal) Rúben(Leixões S.C.)

The 2024 Euro Winners Challenge was the fifth edition of the Euro Winners Challenge (ECC), the of Europe's secondary club beach soccer organized by Beach Soccer Worldwide and open to any team that didn't qualify to the main continental competition. The tournament was held from 7 to 13 June in Nazaré in Portugal alongside the 2024 Euro Winners Cup. It is the first edition of the cup to be played as a sort of beach soccer UEFA Europa League and the first one to be win by a Portuguese club, Leixões SC, who qualify - with the losing finalist - to the following EWC.

== Group stage ==
20 clubs from 7 different countries played in the group-stage phase, with the 5 winners and the best runner-up that qualify to the Quarter-finals with the other 4 runner-ups that compete in a Placement Match to get the last two spots available to Playoff.

Key

- Qualification to the quarter-finals
- Qualification to the placement matches

=== Group A ===
Pos	Team	Pld	W	W+	WP	L	GF	GA	GD	Pts
1	Sesimbra	3	3	0	0	0	22	8	+14	9
2	AO Kefallinia	3	2	0	0	1	8	8	0	6
3	Chelas	3	1	0	0	2	10	15	−5	3
4	Naxos	3	0	0	0	3	5	14	−9	0

Source: BSWW

7 June	Sesimbra (Portugal)	11–4	(Portugal) Chelas
7 June	AO Kefallinia (Greece)	3–2	(Italy) Naxos
8 June	Sesimbra (Portugal)	5–2	(Greece) AO Kefallinia
8 June	Naxos (Italy)	1–5	(Portugal) Chelas
9 June	Chelas (Portugal)	1–3	(Greece) AO Kefallinia
9 June	Naxos (Italy)	2–6	(Portugal) Sesimbra

=== Group B ===
Pos	Team	Pld	W	W+	WP	L	GF	GA	GD	Pts
1	União Ericeirense	3	2	0	1	0	14	9	+5	7
2	Alfarim	3	1	0	1	1	13	8	+5	4
3	O Sótão "B"	3	1	0	0	2	11	9	+2	3
4	Armia Tbilisi	3	0	0	0	3	7	19	−12	0

Source: BSWW

7 June	Alfarim (Portugal)	3–4	(Portugal) União Ericeirense
7 June	Armia Tbilisi (Georgia (country))	3–5	(Portugal) O Sótão "B"
8 June	Alfarim (Portugal)	7–1	(Georgia (country)) Armia Tbilisi
8 June	O Sótão "B" (Portugal)	3–3 (1–4 p.)	(Portugal) União Ericeirense
9 June	União Ericeirense (Portugal)	7–3	(Georgia (country)) Armia Tbilisi
9 June	O Sótão "B" (Portugal)	3–3 (4–5 p.)	(Portugal) Alfarim

=== Group C ===
Pos	Team	Pld	W	W+	WP	L	GF	GA	GD	Pts
1	Leixões	3	3	0	0	0	36	7	+29	9
2	Benfica Viseu	3	1	0	1	1	16	15	+1	4
3	Perwez	3	1	0	0	2	9	20	−11	3
4	Pinheiros	3	0	0	0	3	7	26	−19	0

Source: BSWW

7 June	Leixões (Portugal)	11–3	(Portugal) Pinheiros
7 June	Perwez (Belgium)	3–3 (1–3 p.)	(Portugal) Benfica Viseu
8 June	Leixões (Portugal)	14–1	(Belgium) Perwez
8 June	Benfica Viseu (Portugal)	10–1	(Portugal) Pinheiros
9 June	Pinheiros (Portugal)	3–5	(Belgium) Perwez
9 June	Benfica Viseu (Portugal)	3–11	(Portugal) Leixões

=== Group D ===
Pos	Team	Pld	W	W+	WP	L	GF	GA	GD	Pts
1	Genappe	3	2	0	0	1	6	5	+1	6
2	Porto Mendo	3	0	2	0	1	16	14	+2	4
3	SM Jalles	3	1	0	0	2	12	13	−1	3
4	São Domingos	3	1	0	0	2	9	11	−2	3

Source: BSWW

7 June	São Domingos (Portugal)	4–6 (a.e.t.)	(Portugal) Porto Mendo
7 June	SM Jalles (France)	1–2	(Belgium) Genappe
8 June	São Domingos (Portugal)	3–4	(France) SM Jalles
8 June	Genappe (Belgium)	3–2	(Portugal) Porto Mendo
9 June	Porto Mendo (Portugal)	8–7 (a.e.t.)	(France) SM Jalles
9 June	Genappe (Belgium)	1–2	(Portugal) São Domingos

=== Group E ===
Pos	Team	Pld	W	W+	WP	L	GF	GA	GD	Pts
1	Vila Flor	3	3	0	0	0	15	7	+8	9
2	Southern Cévennes	3	1	0	0	2	13	12	+1	3
3	Portsmouth	3	0	1	0	2	11	14	−3	2
4	Pastéis	3	0	1	0	2	10	16	−6	2

Source: BSWW

7 June	Vila Flor (Portugal)	7–1	(Portugal) Pastéis
7 June	Southern Cévennes (France)	6–3	(England) Portsmouth
8 June	Vila Flor (Portugal)	3–2	(France) Southern Cévennes
8 June	Portsmouth (England)	4–3 (a.e.t.)	(Portugal) Pastéis
9 June	Pastéis (Portugal)	6–5 (a.e.t.)	(France) Southern Cévennes
9 June	Portsmouth (England)	4–5	(Portugal) Vila Flor

== Brackets ==
=== Placement Matches ===
- Porto Mendo vs Benfica Viseu: 4–2
- GD Alfarim vs Southern Cévennes: 6–5

=== Playoff Matches ===
The two finalists earn direct qualification for the 2025 Euro Winners Cup.

Fifth place
13 June; Report
(Belgium) Genappe	3
(Greece) AO Kefallinia	4
Seventh place
13 June; Report
(Portugal) Porto Mendo	5
(Portugal) Alfarim	3

5th–8th place semifinals
12 June; Report
(Portugal) Porto Mendo	1
(Belgium) Genappe	3
12 June; Report
(Greece) AO Kefallinia	8
(Portugal) Alfarim	6

Quarterfinals
11 June; Report
(Portugal) Vila Flor	3
(Portugal) Porto Mendo	2
11 June; Report
(Portugal) Sesimbra	8
(Belgium) Genappe	4
11 June; Report
(Portugal) União Ericeirense	5
(Greece) AO Kefallinia	4
11 June; Report
(Portugal) Leixões	5
(Portugal) Alfarim	1

Semifinals
12 June; Report
(Portugal) Vila Flor	1
(Portugal) Sesimbra	5
12 June; Report
(Portugal) União Ericeirense	3
(Portugal) Leixões	4

Final
13 June; Report
(Portugal) Sesimbra	3
(Portugal) Leixões	4
Third place
13 June; Report
(Portugal) Vila Flor	5
(Portugal) União Ericeirense	4

- Qualification to the 2025 Euro Winners Cup

== 2024 Euro Winners Challenge final ==
=== G.D. Sesimbra vs Leixões S.C. ===
13th June 2025
19:15 CEST

(Portugal) G.D. Sesimbra	3-4	(Portugal) Leixões S.C.
Goncalo Loureiro; Diogo Bernardo; Bernardo Paulo	Report	Trivelas; Ruben; Pedrinho

Final Stadium, Nazaré, Portugal, Portugal
Attendance: ???
Referee: Malte Gerhardt (Germany)

GD de Sesimbra	Leixões Sport Club

== Awards and statistics ==
=== Individual Awards ===
Best Player
(Brazil) Pedrinho (Leixões S.C.)
Top scorer

(Portugal) Matheus Nascimento (Leixões S.C.)
12 goals in 6 games

Best Goalkeeper
(Portugal) Rúben M. P. Regufe (Leixões S.C.)

=== Topscorers ===
Rank	Player	Club	Goals
1	Matheus; Caçula	Leixões S.C. Porto Mendo	12
3	Pedinho	Leixões S.C.	10
4	Diogo Bernanrdo	GD Sesimbra	9
5	Miguel Junior; Andre	Leixões SC; Vila Flor SC	8

=== Final standings ===
Pos	Team	Result
1	(Portugal) Leixões S.C.	2024 Euro Winners Challenge and 2025 Euro Winners Cup
2	(Portugal) G.D. Sesimbra	2025 Euro Winners Cup
3	(Spain) Vila Flor SC	Third place
4	(Portugal) GDU Ericeirense	
5	(Greece) AO Kefallinia	
6	(Spain) FC Genappe	
7	(Portugal) Porto Mendo	
8	(Portugal) GD Alfarim	
9	(Portugal) CB Viseu	
10	(France) Cevennes	

== See also ==
- 2024 Euro Winners Cup
- 2025 Euro Winners Cup
- Euro Winners Challenge
- World Winners Cup
- Euro Winners Challenge
