= 2024 Euro Winners Cup =

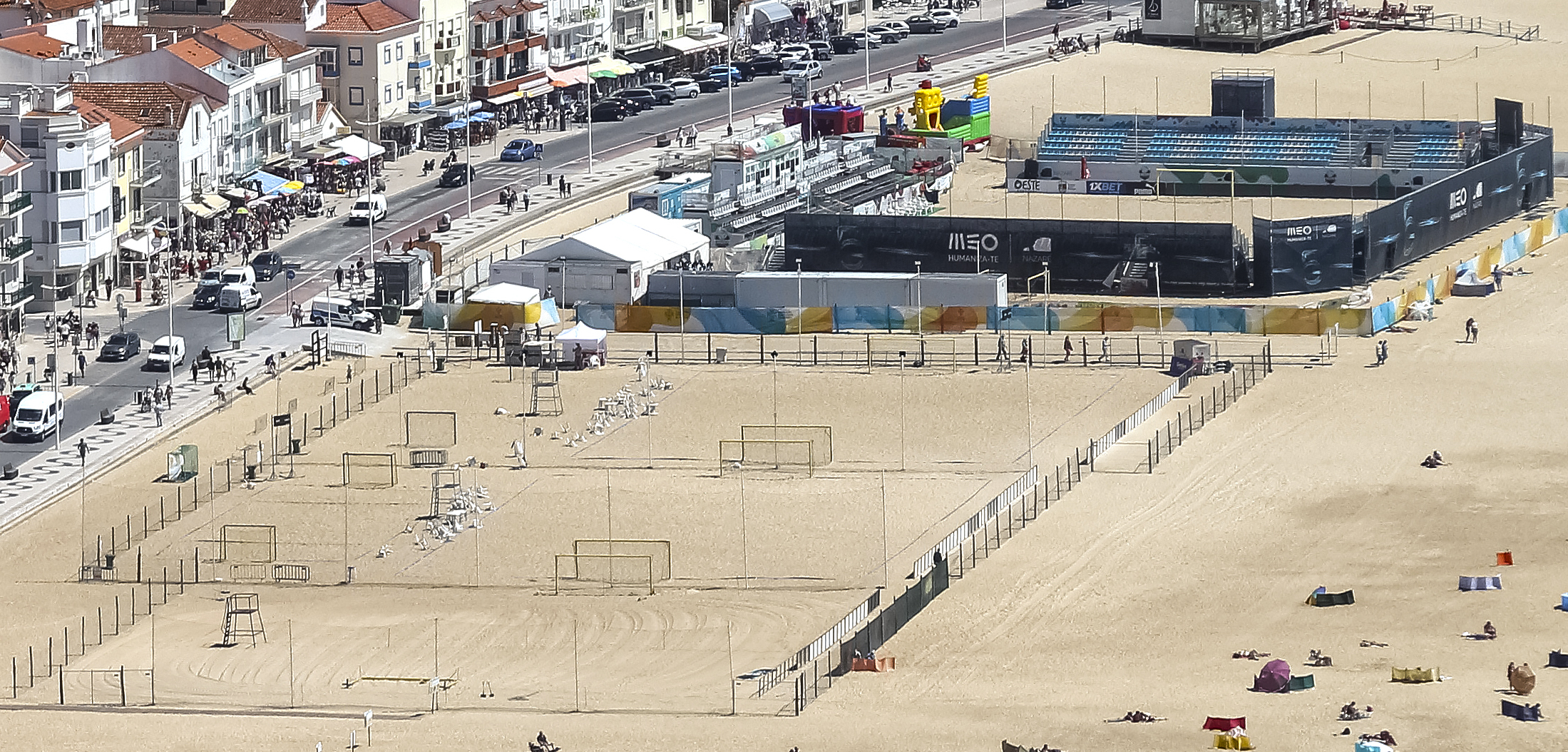
- For the eighth year running, a complex of venues in Nazaré, Portugal, hosted – comprising the Estádio do Viveiro (a semi-permanent feature stadium), and rudimentary auxiliary pitches.

Tournament details
- Host country: Portugal
- Dates: 7–16 June
- Teams: 56 (from 1 confederation)
- Venues: 4 (in 1 host city)

Final positions
- Champions: (Portugal) Braga (4th title)
- Runners-up: (Italy) Pisa
- Third place: (Portugal) O Sótão
- Fourth place: (Spain) Huelva

Origins of the clubs in the 2024 Euro Winners Cup group stage.
Groups key: A; B; C; D; E; F; G; H; I.

The 2024 Euro Winners Cup was the twelfth edition of the Euro Winners Cup (EWC), an annual continental beach soccer tournament for men's top-division European clubs. The championship is widely viewed as beach soccer's rudimentary version of the better known UEFA Champions League in its parent sport, association football.

Organised by Beach Soccer Worldwide (BSWW), the tournament was held in Nazaré, Portugal, from 7 to 16 June.

Following a preliminary qualification round, the event began with a round robin group stage. At its conclusion, the best teams progressed to the knockout stage, a series of single elimination games to determine the winners, starting with the Round of 16 and ending with the final. Consolation matches were also played to determine other final rankings.

Kfar Qassem of Israel were the defending champions, but were eliminated in the quarterfinals, ultimately placing fifth. Braga of Portugal won the tournament, claiming their fourth European crown; they defeated Pisa of Italy in the final, condemning the Tuscans to a consecutive runners-up finish.

== Teams ==
=== Qualification ===
Qualification for the competition is similar to the UEFA Champions League, whereby clubs qualify via their country's national beach soccer league (being a country which is a member association of UEFA).

The exact number of clubs which qualify from each association depends on the perceived "strength" of their country's league. BSWW determine the strength of each league by analysing the performance of all clubs in the EWC on a country-by-country basis over the previous five editions; a points-based ranking is produced from the data. From the most recent edition of their respective leagues, the best performing nations in the ranking are permitted to enter multiple top placing clubs (being their league champions and one or more runners-up), whilst the worst performing are allowed to enter just one club (being their league champions). This is similar in concept to that of the UEFA coefficient ranking.

Eligible clubs may choose not to, or are unable to participate. Thus, in reality, some countries fill their quota with clubs placed lower down in their league, don't claim all their slots, sometimes fill none of their slots at all, and sometimes unclaimed slots are transferred to other associations at the discretion of BSWW.

Any and all clubs that do not qualify via their league placing, and/or are surplus to their countries' allocated quotas, are invited to enter the accompanying Euro Winners Challenge (preliminary round) to begin in the days prior to the competition proper. The Challenge is both a competition in its own right and acts as an alternative qualification route for this edition of the EWC; the semi-finals of the Challenge double as Round of 32 ties of the EWC and the Challenge final doubles as a Round of 16 tie of the EWC. The winners of the latter are crowned champions of the Challenge and are rewarded with a place in the quarter-finals of the EWC at which stage they become fully integrated with the clubs of the competition proper.

=== Entrants ===
56 clubs from 24 different nations enter the event – 36 enter straight into the group stage, 20 enter into the 2024 Euro Winners Challenge.

In accordance with sanctions imposed by FIFA and UEFA in 2022 in response to the Russian invasion of Ukraine, clubs from Russia remain banned from entering this year.

Key: H: Host club \ TH: Title holders

Group stage
Portugal (4)	Braga	Spain (3)	Platja de Roses	Latvia (1)	Riga FC
Portugal (4)	GRAP	Spain (3)	Recreativo Huelva	Moldova (1)	Nistru Chișinău
Portugal (4)	Nazaré 2022	Spain (3)	Vitoria	Netherlands (1)	Altena
Portugal (4)	O Sótão (H)	Israel (2)	Kfar Qassem (TH)	Romania (1)	West Deva
Italy (4)	Catania	Israel (2)	Rosh HaAyin	Slovakia (1)	Hustý
Italy (4)	Napoli	Belarus (1)	TSOR Mogilev	Sweden (1)	Frösö IF
Italy (4)	Pisa	Belgium (1)	ES Brainoise	Switzerland (1)	Havana Shots Aargau
Italy (4)	Viareggio	Bulgaria (1)	Spartak Varna	Turkey (1)	Erciş Spor
France (3)	Marseille BT	Cyprus (1)	Paphos		
France (3)	Marseille Minots	Czech Republic (1)	Slavia Prague		
France (3)	Mouilleron	Finland (1)	Baggio		
Germany (3)	Bavaria Beach Bazis	Georgia (1)	Dinamo Batumi		
Germany (3)	Real Münster	Greece (1)	Napoli Patron		
Germany (3)	Rostocker Robben	Hungary (1)	Bonyhád		
2024 Euro Winners Challenge
Portugal (12) 1/2	Alfarim	Portugal (12) 2/2	São Domingos	Italy (1)	Naxos
Portugal (12) 1/2	Benfica Viseu	Portugal (12) 2/2	Sesimbra	England (1)	Portsmouth
Portugal (12) 1/2	Chelas	Portugal (12) 2/2	União Ericeirense	Georgia (1)	Armia Tbilisi
Portugal (12) 1/2	Leixões	Portugal (12) 2/2	Vila Flor	Greece (1)	AO Kefallinia
Portugal (12) 1/2	O Sótão "B"	France (2)	SM Jalles		
Portugal (12) 1/2	Pastéis	France (2)	Southern Cévennes		
Portugal (12) 1/2	Pinheiros	Belgium (2)	Genappe		
Portugal (12) 1/2	Porto Mendo	Belgium (2)	Perwez		

== Draw ==
The draw to split the 36 clubs into nine groups of four, and 20 clubs into five groups of four, for the group and preliminary stages respectively, took place on 16 May.

== Euro Winners Challenge ==
This was the first edition of the Challenge Cup played in parallel to the EWC with the winner and the runners-up of 2024 Euro Winners Challenge that qualify to the 2025 Euro Winners Cup.

== Group stage ==
All group winners, along with the best runners-up, progress to the knockout stage.

The other four runners-up progress to a play-off round to decide the final two knockout stage berths.

All third-placed and fourth-placed teams recede to a set of consolation matches to determine final placements.

Key

- Qualification to the knockout stage
- Qualification to the play-off round
- Recede to placement matches

=== Group A ===
Pos	Team	Pld	W	W+	WP	L	GF	GA	GD	Pts
1	O Sótão (H)	3	3	0	0	0	21	3	+18	9
2	Real Münster	3	2	0	0	1	18	13	+5	6
3	Vitoria	3	1	0	0	2	8	11	−3	3
4	ES Brainoise	3	0	0	0	3	8	28	−20	0

Source: BSWW
(H) Host

9 June	Real Münster (Germany)	10–6	(Belgium) ES Brainoise
9 June	Vitoria (Spain)	0–4	(Portugal) O Sótão
10 June	Real Münster (Germany)	6–3	(Spain) Vitoria
10 June	O Sótão (Portugal)	13–1	(Belgium) ES Brainoise
11 June	ES Brainoise (Belgium)	1–5	(Spain) Vitoria
11 June	O Sótão (Portugal)	4–2	(Germany) Real Münster

=== Group B ===
Pos	Team	Pld	W	W+	WP	L	GF	GA	GD	Pts
1	Kfar Qassem	3	3	0	0	0	34	4	+30	9
2	Spartak Varna	3	2	0	0	1	17	12	+5	6
3	Bavaria Beach Bazis	3	1	0	0	2	6	14	−8	3
4	Frösö IF	3	0	0	0	3	2	29	−27	0

Source: BSWW

9 June	Bavaria Beach Bazis (Germany)	1–6	(Bulgaria) Spartak Varna
9 June	Frösö IF (Sweden)	0–17	(Israel) Kfar Qassem
10 June	Spartak Varna (Bulgaria)	9–2	(Sweden) Frösö IF
10 June	Kfar Qassem (Israel)	8–2	(Germany) Bavaria Beach Bazis
11 June	Bavaria Beach Bazis (Germany)	3–0	(Sweden) Frösö IF
11 June	Kfar Qassem (Israel)	9–2	(Bulgaria) Spartak Varna

=== Group C ===
Pos	Team	Pld	W	W+	WP	L	GF	GA	GD	Pts
1	Braga	3	3	0	0	0	25	3	+22	9
2	Bonyhád	3	2	0	0	1	9	17	−8	6
3	Marseille BT	3	1	0	0	2	9	10	−1	3
4	Slavia Prague	3	0	0	0	3	7	20	−13	0

Source: BSWW

9 June	Marseille BT (France)	5–2	(Czech Republic) Slavia Prague
9 June	Bonyhád (Hungary)	1–10	(Portugal) Braga
10 June	Marseille BT (France)	2–4	(Hungary) Bonyhád
10 June	Braga (Portugal)	11–0	(Czech Republic) Slavia Prague
11 June	Slavia Prague (Czech Republic)	4–5	(Hungary) Bonyhád
11 June	Braga (Portugal)	4–2	(France) Marseille BT

=== Group D ===
Pos	Team	Pld	W	W+	WP	L	GF	GA	GD	Pts
1	Viareggio	3	3	0	0	0	31	6	+25	9
2	West Deva	3	2	0	0	1	16	14	+2	6
3	Mouilleron	3	1	0	0	2	9	22	−13	3
4	Hustý	3	0	0	0	3	6	20	−14	0

Source: BSWW

9 June	Hustý (Slovakia)	2–5	(Romania) West Deva
9 June	Mouilleron (France)	1–12	(Italy) Viareggio
10 June	Hustý (Slovakia)	4–6	(France) Mouilleron
10 June	Viareggio (Italy)	10–5	(Romania) West Deva
11 June	West Deva (Romania)	6–2	(France) Mouilleron
11 June	Viareggio (Italy)	9–0	(Slovakia) Hustý

=== Group E ===
Pos	Team	Pld	W	W+	WP	L	GF	GA	GD	Pts
1	Huelva	3	3	0	0	0	26	7	+19	9
2	Riga	3	2	0	0	1	17	8	+9	6
3	Altena	3	1	0	0	2	11	15	−4	3
4	Baggio	3	0	0	0	3	3	27	−24	0

Source: BSWW

9 June	Riga (Latvia)	9–1	(Finland) Baggio
9 June	Altena (Netherlands)	3–9	(Spain) Huelva
10 June	Riga (Latvia)	4–2	(Netherlands) Altena
10 June	Huelva (Spain)	12–0	(Finland) Baggio
11 June	Baggio (Finland)	2–6	(Netherlands) Altena
11 June	Huelva (Spain)	5–4	(Latvia) Riga

=== Group F ===
Pos	Team	Pld	W	W+	WP	L	GF	GA	GD	Pts
1	Rostocker Robben	3	2	0	0	1	16	8	+8	6
2	Paphos	3	2	0	0	1	9	4	+5	6
3	Nistru Chișinău	3	1	1	0	1	11	9	+2	5
4	Dinamo Batumi	3	0	0	0	3	2	17	−15	0

Source: BSWW

9 June	Paphos (Cyprus)	3–2	(Moldova) Nistru Chișinău
9 June	Dinamo Batumi (Georgia (country))	1–9	(Germany) Rostocker Robben
10 June	Paphos (Cyprus)	5–0	(Georgia (country)) Dinamo Batumi
10 June	Rostocker Robben (Germany)	5–6 (a.e.t.)	(Moldova) Nistru Chișinău
11 June	Nistru Chișinău (Moldova)	3–1	(Georgia (country)) Dinamo Batumi
11 June	Rostocker Robben (Germany)	2–1	(Cyprus) Paphos

=== Group G ===
Pos	Team	Pld	W	W+	WP	L	GF	GA	GD	Pts
1	Pisa	3	3	0	0	0	13	1	+12	9
2	Roses Platja	3	2	0	0	1	7	13	−6	6
3	Nazaré 2022	3	1	0	0	2	7	9	−2	3
4	Marseille Minots	3	0	0	0	3	3	7	−4	0

Source: BSWW

9 June	Pisa (Italy)	3–1	(Portugal) Nazaré 2022
9 June	Roses Platja (Spain)	3–1	(France) Marseille Minots
10 June	Pisa (Italy)	9–0	(Spain) Roses Platja
10 June	Marseille Minots (France)	2–3	(Portugal) Nazaré 2022
11 June	Nazaré 2022 (Portugal)	3–4	(Spain) Roses Platja
11 June	Marseille Minots (France)	0–1	(Italy) Pisa

=== Group H ===
Pos	Team	Pld	W	W+	WP	L	GF	GA	GD	Pts
1	TSOR Mogilev	3	2	0	1	0	12	8	+4	7
2	Catania	3	1	1	0	1	10	9	+1	5
3	Rosh HaAyin	3	1	0	0	2	9	8	+1	3
4	GRAP	3	0	0	0	3	9	15	−6	0

Source: BSWW

9 June	GRAP (Portugal)	5–6	(Italy) Catania
9 June	TSOR Mogilev (Belarus)	4–4 (8–7 p.)	(Israel) Rosh HaAyin
10 June	GRAP (Portugal)	2–5	(Belarus) TSOR Mogilev
10 June	Rosh HaAyin (Israel)	1–2 (a.e.t.)	(Italy) Catania
11 June	Catania (Italy)	2–3	(Belarus) TSOR Mogilev
11 June	Rosh HaAyin (Israel)	4–2	(Portugal) GRAP

=== Group I ===
Pos	Team	Pld	W	W+	WP	L	GF	GA	GD	Pts
1	Napoli	3	2	1	0	0	25	12	+13	8
2	Napoli Patron	3	2	0	0	1	14	13	+1	6
3	Erciş Spor	3	0	0	1	2	9	13	−4	1
4	Havana Shots Aargau	3	0	0	0	3	7	17	−10	0

Source: BSWW

9 June	Napoli (Italy)	11–2	(Switzerland) Havana Shots Aargau
9 June	Erciş Spor (Turkey)	3–4	(Greece) Napoli Patron
10 June	Napoli (Italy)	7–4	(Turkey) Erciş Spor
10 June	Napoli Patron (Greece)	4–3	(Switzerland) Havana Shots Aargau
11 June	Havana Shots Aargau (Switzerland)	2–2 (2–4 p.)	(Turkey) Erciş Spor
11 June	Napoli Patron (Greece)	6–7 (a.e.t.)	(Italy) Napoli

== Placement matches ==
Matches took place on 12 June.

35th place
Baggio	1–3	Frösö IF
33rd place
Dinamo Batumi	5–4	ES Brainoise
31st place
Hustý	4–4 (8–7 p.)	Slavia Prague
29th place
GRAP	7–1	Havana Shots Aargau
27th place
Erciş Spor	6–3	Marseille Minots
25th place
Bavaria Beach Bazis	3–6	Mouilleron
23rd place
Vitoria	6–5	Altena
21st place
Marseille BT	4–3	Nazaré 2022
19th place
Nistru Chișinău	2–3	Rosh HaAyin

== Knockout stage ==
=== Play-off round ===
The two winners qualify for the Round of 16.

Play-offs for Round of 16
12 June; Report
(Greece) Napoli Patron	0
(Italy) Catania	8
12 June; Report
(Hungary) Bonyhád	1
(Spain) Roses Platja	4

Qualified for Round of 16
(Italy) Catania
(Spain) Roses Platja

17th place match
13 June; Report
Napoli Patron	4
Bonyhad	5

=== Round of 16 onwards ===
Round of 16 losers placement
15th place – 14 June; Report
(Spain) Roses Platja	4
(Italy) Catania	7
13th place – 14 June; Report
(Bulgaria) Spartak Varna	6
(Romania) West Deva	4
11th place – 14 June; Report
(Latvia) Riga	1
(Cyprus) Paphos	3
9th place – 14 June; Report
(Italy) Viareggio	4
(Germany) Rostocker Robben	2

Round of 16
13 June; Report
(Belarus) TSOR Mogilev	8
(Bulgaria) Spartak Varna	3
13 June; Report
(Portugal) Braga	6
(Cyprus) Paphos	2
13 June; Report
(Spain) Huelva	4
(Germany) Rostocker Robben	3
13 June; Report
(Italy) Napoli	6
(Romania) West Deva	2
13 June; Report
(Portugal) O Sótão	4
(Spain) Roses Platja	1
13 June; Report
(Israel) Kfar Qassem	6
(Latvia) Riga	3
13 June; Report
(Italy) Viareggio	3 (7)
(Germany) Real Münster (p)	3 (8)
13 June; Report
(Italy) Pisa	5
(Italy) Catania	3

Quarterfinals
14 June; Report
(Belarus) TSOR Mogilev	5
(Portugal) Braga	7
14 June; Report
(Spain) Huelva	6
(Italy) Napoli	3
14 June; Report
(Portugal) O Sótão (a.e.t.)	8
(Israel) Kfar Qassem	7
14 June; Report
(Germany) Real Münster	3
(Italy) Pisa	4

Semi-finals
15 June; Report
(Portugal) Braga	6
(Spain) Huelva	4
15 June; Report
(Portugal) O Sótão	3 (1)
(Italy) Pisa (p)	3 (4)
5th–8th semi-finals
15 June; Report
(Belarus) TSOR Mogilev	4
(Italy) Napoli	3
15 June; Report
(Israel) Kfar Qassem (p)	5 (5)
(Germany) Real Münster	5 (4)

Final
16 June; Report
(Portugal) Braga	5
(Italy) Pisa	3
3rd place match
16 June; Report
(Spain) Huelva	4
(Portugal) O Sótão	7
5th place match
16 June; Report
(Belarus) TSOR Mogilev	3
(Israel) Kfar Qassem	8
7th place match
16 June; Report
(Italy) Napoli	5
(Germany) Real Münster	3

==== Championship match details ====
16 June 2024
19:00 WEST (UTC+1)

Braga	5–3	Pisa
Bokinha 8', (red card) 16'; Bê Martins (yellow card) 7', (goal) 9'; Léo Martins (yellow card) 22', (goal) 24'; Filipe Silva 28'; Pedro Mano 33'	Report	4', 14', (yellow card) 19' Edson Hulk; 30' Barsotti

Estádio do Viveiro
Referee: Ago Kärtmann (Estonia)

== Awards ==
The following individual awards were presented after the final.

Top scorer(s)
(Spain) Chiky Ardil ( (Portugal) O Sótão)
15 goals
Best player
(Brazil) Filipe Silva ( (Portugal) Braga)
Best goalkeeper
(Italy) Leandro Casapieri ( Pisa)

== Top goalscorers ==
Players with at least five goals are listed.

15 goals

- (Spain) Chiky Ardil ( (Portugal) O Sótão)

14 goals

- (Brazil) Edson Hulk ( (Italy) Pisa)

13 goals

- (Spain) Francisco Casano ( (Spain) Huelva)

12 goals

- (Switzerland) Noël Ott ( (Israel) Kfar Qassem)
- (Brazil) Rodrigo ( (Israel) Kfar Qassem)

9 goals

- (Brazil) Balinha ( (Bulgaria) Spartak Varna)
- (Brazil) Filipe Silva ( (Portugal) Braga)
- (Israel) Hamada Jabaren ( (Israel) Kfar Qassem)
- (Portugal) Jordan Santos ( (Portugal) Braga)
- (Portugal) Miguel Pintado ( (Portugal) Braga)

8 goals

- (Italy) Gabriele Gori ( (Italy) Viareggio)

7 goals

- (Brazil) Igor Ricardo ( (Latvia) Riga)
- (Brazil) Igor ( (Bulgaria) Spartak Varna)
- (Hungary) Richárd Patócs ( (Hungary) Bonyhád)
- (Portugal) Léo Martins ( (Portugal) Braga)
- (Paraguay) Carlos Carballo ( (Spain) Huelva)
- (Spain) Soleiman Batis ( (Spain) Huelva)
- (Belarus) Yauheni Novikau ( (Belarus) TSOR Mogilev)
- (Belarus) Yahor Hardzetski ( (Belarus) TSOR Mogilev)
- (Brazil) Lucão ( (Italy) Napoli)
- (Switzerland) Glenn Hodel ( (Germany) Real Münster)

6 goals

- (Moldova) Petru Popescu ( (Moldova) Nistru Chișinău)
- (France) Romain Billet ( (France) Mouilleron)
- (Brazil) Paulinho Barboza ( (Turkey) Erciş Spor)
- (Spain) Pablo Pérez ( (Germany) Rostocker Robben)
- (Brazil) Mateusinho ( (Cyprus) Paphos)
- (Portugal) Bê Martins ( (Portugal) Braga)
- (Brazil) Bokinha ( (Portugal) Braga)
- (Israel) Amer Yatim ( (Israel) Kfar Qassem)
- (Germany) Christian Biermann ( (Germany) Real Münster)
- (Italy) Salvatore Sanfilippo ( (Italy) Napoli)

5 goals

- (Netherlands) Bjorn Wagenaar ( (Netherlands) Altena)
- (Portugal) Vasco Gonçalves ( (Portugal) GRAP)
- (Brazil) Eudin ( (Italy) Viareggio)
- (Italy) Gianmarco Genovali ( (Italy) Viareggio)
- (Italy) Alessandro Remedi ( (Italy) Viareggio)
- (Romania) Cosmin Zamfir ( (Romania) West Deva)
- (Romania) Marian Măciucă ( (Romania) West Deva)
- (Italy) Emmanuele Zurlo ( (Italy) Napoli)
- (Italy) Ovidio Alla ( (Italy) Napoli)
- (Brazil) Igor Iguinho ( (Italy) Catania)
- (Belarus) Yury Piatrouski ( (Belarus) TSOR Mogilev)
- (Israel) Sameh Moreb ( (Israel) Kfar Qassem)
- (Brazil) Bruno Xavier ( (Israel) Kfar Qassem)
- (Brazil) Deiverson Dmais ( (Germany) Real Münster)

Source: BSWW

== Final standings ==
Rank	Team	Result
1	Braga	Champions (4th title)
2	Pisa	Runners-up
3	O Sótão	Third place
4	Huelva	Fourth place
5	Kfar Qassem	Eliminated in the Quarter-finals
6	TSOR Mogilev	Eliminated in the Quarter-finals
7	Napoli	Eliminated in the Quarter-finals
8	Real Münster	Eliminated in the Quarter-finals
9	Viareggio	Eliminated in the Round of 16
10	Rostocker Robben	Eliminated in the Round of 16
11	Paphos	Eliminated in the Round of 16
12	Riga	Eliminated in the Round of 16
13	Spartak Varna	Eliminated in the Round of 16
14	West Deva	Eliminated in the Round of 16
15	Catania	Eliminated in the Round of 16
16	Roses Platja	Eliminated in the Round of 16
17	Bonyhád	Eliminated in the Play-off Round
18	Napoli Patron	Eliminated in the Play-off Round
19	Rosh HaAyin	Eliminated in the Group Stage
20	Nistru Chișinău	Eliminated in the Group Stage
21	Marseille BT	Eliminated in the Group Stage
22	Nazaré 2022	Eliminated in the Group Stage
23	Vitoria	Eliminated in the Group Stage
24	Altena	Eliminated in the Group Stage
25	Mouilleron	Eliminated in the Group Stage
26	Bavaria Beach Bazis	Eliminated in the Group Stage
27	Erciş Spor	Eliminated in the Group Stage
28	Marseille Minots	Eliminated in the Group Stage
29	GRAP	Eliminated in the Group Stage
30	Havana Shots Aargau	Eliminated in the Group Stage
31	Hustý	Eliminated in the Group Stage
32	Slavia Prague	Eliminated in the Group Stage
33	Dinamo Batumi	Eliminated in the Group Stage
34	ES Brainoise	Eliminated in the Group Stage
35	Frösö IF	Eliminated in the Group Stage
36	Baggio	Eliminated in the Group Stage

== See also ==
- 2024 Euro Winners Challenge
- 2024 Women's Euro Winners Cup
- 2023–24 UEFA Futsal Champions League
