= 2023 Euro Winners Cup =

Tournament details
- Host country: Portugal
- Dates: 9–18 June
- Teams: 52 (from 1 confederation)
- Venues: 4 (in 1 host city)

Final positions
- Champions: (Israel) Kfar Qassem (1st title)
- Runners-up: (Italy) Pisa 2014
- Third place: (Portugal) O Sótão
- Fourth place: (Spain) Huelva

Tournament statistics
- Matches played: 117
- Goals scored: 990 (8.46 per match)

The 2023 Euro Winners Cup was the eleventh edition of the Euro Winners Cup (EWC), an annual continental beach soccer tournament for men's top-division European clubs. The championship is viewed as beach football's rudimentary version of the better known UEFA Champions League in its parent sport, association football.

Organised by Beach Soccer Worldwide (BSWW), the tournament was held in Nazaré, Portugal from 9–18 June.

Following a preliminary qualification round, the event began with a round robin group stage. At its conclusion, the best teams progressed to the knockout stage, a series of single elimination games to determine the winners, starting with the Round of 32 and ending with the final. Consolation matches were also played to determine other final rankings.

Benfica Loures of Portugal were the defending champions but did not enter this year due to financial restraints. The tournament was won by Kfar Qassem of Israel who claimed their first title.

== Teams ==
=== Qualification ===
The number of clubs entitled to enter automatically from each country depends on the perceived strength of their country's national league. BSWW determine the strength of each league by analysing the performance of all clubs in the EWC on a country-by-country basis over the previous five editions. A points-based ranking is produced from the data with the best performing nations permitted to enter multiple clubs.

Any and all clubs that do not qualify automatically, and/or are surplus to their countries allocated quotas, are entitled to enter the accompanying Euro Winners Challenge (preliminary round) to take place in the days prior to the competition proper, as a last opportunity to qualify for the EWC group stage; the best four clubs will qualify.

In accordance with sanctions imposed by FIFA and UEFA in 2022 in response to the Russian invasion of Ukraine, clubs from Russia remain banned from entering this year.

=== Entrants ===
52 clubs from 21 different nations entered the event – 36 entered straight into the group stage, 16 entered into the preliminary round.

SA MVR of Bulgaria originally entered the EW Challenge and were present for the draw but subsequently withdrew and were replaced by Leixões of Portugal.

Key: H: Hosts \ TH: Title holders

Group stage
Portugal (5)	ACD O Sótão (H)	France (3)	AS Étaples	England (1)	Isle of Wight
Portugal (5)	Braga	France (3)	La Grande-Motte Pyramide	Estonia (1)	Nõmme
Portugal (5)	GRAP	France (3)	Marseille BT	Czech Republic (1)	Bohemians 1905
Portugal (5)	Nacional	Ukraine (2)	Artur Music	Slovakia (1)	Hustý
Portugal (5)	Varzim	Ukraine (2)	VIT Kyiv	Georgia (1)	Telavi
Spain (3)	Huelva	Belgium (2)	ES Brainoise	Latvia (1)	Riga
Spain (3)	Levante	Belgium (2)	Newteam Brussels	Malta (1)	Ta' Xbiex
Spain (3)	Marbella	Greece (2)	Atlas AO	Cyprus (1)	Paphos
Germany (3)	Beach Royals Düsseldorf	Greece (2)	Napoli Patron		
Germany (3)	Real Münster	Turkey (1)	Alanya Belediyespor		
Germany (3)	Rostocker Robben	Israel (1)	Kfar Qassem		
Italy (3)	Naxos	Bulgaria (1)	Spartak Varna		
Italy (3)	Pisa 2014	Moldova (1)	Nistru Chișinău		
Italy (3)	Viareggio	Romania (1)	West Deva		
Euro Winners Challenge (preliminary round)
Portugal (8)	ACD O Sótão B	France (2)	Marseille Minots		
Portugal (8)	Benfica Viseu	France (2)	SM Jalles		
Portugal (8)	Buarcos 2017	Belgium (2)	Genappe		
Portugal (8)	Leixões	Belgium (2)	Perwez		
Portugal (8)	Nazaré 2022	Greece (1)	AO Kefallinia		
Portugal (8)	São Domingos	Moldova (1)	Ghidighici		
Portugal (8)	Sesimbra	England (1)	Portsmouth		
Portugal (8)	Vilaflor	Finland (1)	Miehet		

== Draw ==
The draw to split the 36 clubs into nine groups of four, and 16 clubs into four groups of four for the group and preliminary stages respectively, took place on 18 May.

== Euro Winners Challenge (preliminary round) ==
=== Group stage ===
The designation of "home" and "away" teams displayed in the results matrices is for administrative purposes only.

Matches took place from 9 to 11 June.

Key

- ^{†} – Walkover
- * – Extra-time result
- ^{♦} – Match decided by penalty shootout

==== Group A ====
Pos	Team	Pld	W	W+	WP	L	GF	GA	GD	Pts	Qualification	VIL	BUA	KEF	MIE
1	Vilaflor	3	3	0	0	0	18	5	+13	9	Knockout stage	—	—	3−1	9–0
2	Buarcos 2017	3	2	0	0	1	18	12	+6	6	Knockout stage	4−6	—	5–2	—
3	AO Kefallinia	3	1	0	0	2	8	12	−4	3		—	—	—	5−4
4	Miehet	3	0	0	0	3	8	23	−15	0		—	4−9	—	—

Source: BSWW

==== Group B ====
Pos	Team	Pld	W	W+	WP	L	GF	GA	GD	Pts	Qualification	LEI	NAZ	SES	POR
1	Leixões	3	3	0	0	0	21	7	+14	9	Knockout stage	—	—	9−3	—
2	Nazaré 2022	3	2	0	0	1	11	9	+2	6	Knockout stage	3–5	—	—	3−2
3	Sesimbra	3	1	0	0	2	10	16	−6	3		—	2−5	—	5–2
4	Portsmouth	3	0	0	0	3	5	15	−10	0		1−7	—	—	—

Source: BSWW

==== Group C ====
Pos	Team	Pld	W	W+	WP	L	GF	GA	GD	Pts	Qualification	GEN	SMJ	VIS	SAO
1	Genappe	3	2	0	1	0	10	6	+4	7	Knockout stage	—	5−2	—	—
2	SM Jalles	3	2	0	0	1	10	10	0	6	Knockout stage	—	—	—	6−4
3	Benfica Viseu	3	1	0	0	2	9	9	0	3		3−4	1–2	—	—
4	São Domingos	3	0	0	0	3	8	12	−4	0		1–1^{♦}	—	3−5	—

Source: BSWW

==== Group D ====
Pos	Team	Pld	W	W+	WP	L	GF	GA	GD	Pts	Qualification	MMS	ACD	PER	GHI
1	Marseille Minots	3	3	0	0	0	15	6	+9	9	Knockout stage	—	—	—	3−0^{†}
2	ACD O Sótão B	3	2	0	0	1	12	8	+4	6	Knockout stage	5–7	—	4−1	—
3	Perwez	3	1	0	0	2	5	9	−4	3		1−5	—	—	3−0^{†}
4	Ghidighici	3	0	0	0	3	0	9	−9	0	Withdrew	—	0−3^{†}	—	—

Source: BSWW

=== Knockout stage ===
Key

- w/o – Walkover (awarded as 3–0)
- np – not played

Fifth place
15 June; Report
Leixões	1
Vilaflor	4
Seventh place
15 June; Report
SM Jalles	3
Genappe	6

5th–8th place semifinals
14 June; Report
SM Jalles	4
Leixões	7
14 June; Report
Genappe	3 (3)
Vilaflor (p)	3 (5)

Quarterfinals
13 June; Report
Marseille Minots	9
SM Jalles	5
13 June; Report
Leixões	1
Buarcos 2017	4
13 June; Report
Genappe	2
ACD O Sótão B	4
13 June; Report
Vilaflor	4
Nazaré 2022	7

Semifinals
14 June; Report
Marseille Minots (a.e.t.)	9
Buarcos 2017	6
14 June; Report
ACD O Sótão B (p)	3 (3)
Nazaré 2022	3 (1)

Final
15 June; Report
Marseille Minots	9
ACD O Sótão B	5
Third place
15 June; Report
Buarcos 2017	4
Nazaré 2022	6

== Group stage ==
Matches take place from 12 to 14 June.

All group winners, runners-up and third-placed teams, along with the best fourth-placed team, progressed to the knockout stage.

=== Group A ===
Pos	Team	Pld	W	W+	WP	L	GF	GA	GD	Pts	Qualification	PAF	ACD	NAX	WDA
1	Pafos	3	3	0	0	0	21	8	+13	9	Knockout stage	—	3−2	—	—
2	ACD O Sótão (H)	3	2	0	0	1	20	9	+11	6	Knockout stage	—	—	12−3	6−3
3	Naxos	3	1	0	0	2	10	26	−16	3	Knockout stage	2−10	—	—	—
4	West Deva	3	0	0	0	3	11	19	−8	0		4−8	—	4−5	—

Source: BSWW
(H) Host

=== Group B ===
Pos	Team	Pld	W	W+	WP	L	GF	GA	GD	Pts	Qualification	BRA	BOH	NOM	TEL
1	Braga	3	3	0	0	0	23	3	+20	9	Knockout stage	—	5−1	—	13−1
2	Bohemians 1905	3	2	0	0	1	10	8	+2	6	Knockout stage	—	—	4−1	—
3	Nõmme	3	1	0	0	2	9	10	−1	3	Knockout stage	1−5	—	—	—
4	Telavi	3	0	0	0	3	4	25	−21	0		—	2−5	1−7	—

Source: BSWW

=== Group C ===
Pos	Team	Pld	W	W+	WP	L	GF	GA	GD	Pts	Qualification	ART	VAR	MAR	TAX
1	Artur Music	3	3	0	0	0	22	6	+16	9	Knockout stage	—	—	—	10−1
2	Varzim	3	2	0	0	1	17	8	+9	6	Knockout stage	1−5	—	8−2	—
3	Marbella	3	1	0	0	2	18	17	+1	3	Knockout stage	4−7	—	—	12−2
4	Ta' Xbiex	3	0	0	0	3	4	30	−26	0		—	1−8	—	—

Source: BSWW

=== Group D ===
Pos	Team	Pld	W	W+	WP	L	GF	GA	GD	Pts	Qualification	MAR	RIG	ESB	BRD
1	Marseille BT	3	2	0	0	1	10	4	+6	6	Knockout stage	—	2−3	—	—
2	Riga	3	2	0	0	1	8	5	+3	6	Knockout stage	—	—	—	0−3^{†}
3	ES Brainoise	3	2	0	0	1	7	7	0	6	Knockout stage	1−5	3−2	—	—
4	Beach Royals Düsseldorf	3	0	0	0	3	0	9	−9	0	Withdrew	0−3^{†}	—	0−3^{†}	—

Source: BSWW

=== Group E ===
Pos	Team	Pld	W	W+	WP	L	GF	GA	GD	Pts	Qualification	PIS	ROS	VIT	GRA
1	Pisa 2014	3	3	0	0	0	16	7	+9	9	Knockout stage	—	5−2	—	6−1
2	Rostocker Robben	3	2	0	0	1	17	14	+3	6	Knockout stage	—	—	6−5	—
3	VIT Kyiv	3	0	0	1	2	15	17	−2	1	Knockout stage	4−5	—	—	—
4	GRAP	3	0	0	0	3	11	21	−10	0		—	4−9	6–6^{♦}	—

Source: BSWW

=== Group F ===
Pos	Team	Pld	W	W+	WP	L	GF	GA	GD	Pts	Qualification	LEV	NAC	NEW	HUS
1	Levante	3	3	0	0	0	17	4	+13	9	Knockout stage	—	—	3−1	6−1
2	Nacional	3	2	0	0	1	12	11	+1	6	Knockout stage	2−8	—	—	—
3	Newteam Brussels	3	1	0	0	2	10	11	−1	3	Knockout stage	—	2−6	—	7−2
4	Hustý	3	0	0	0	3	4	17	−13	0		—	1−4	—	—

Source: BSWW

=== Group G ===
Pos	Team	Pld	W	W+	WP	L	GF	GA	GD	Pts	Qualification	HUE	MUN	GMP	NIS
1	Huelva	3	2	0	0	1	18	14	+4	6	Knockout stage	—	—	7−3	—
2	Real Münster	3	2	0	0	1	14	10	+4	6	Knockout stage	3−4	—	—	—
3	La Grande-Motte Pyramide	3	1	0	0	2	14	13	+1	3	Knockout stage	—	3−4	—	8−2
4	Nistru Chișinău	3	1	0	0	2	13	22	−9	3	Knockout stage	8−7	3−7	—	—

Source: BSWW

=== Group H ===
Pos	Team	Pld	W	W+	WP	L	GF	GA	GD	Pts	Qualification	KQM	NPN	VAR	IOW
1	Kfar Qassem	3	3	0	0	0	19	5	+14	9	Knockout stage	—	6−0	6−3	—
2	Napoli Patron	3	2	0	0	1	12	13	−1	6	Knockout stage	—	—	—	7−3
3	Spartak Varna	3	1	0	0	2	13	12	+1	3	Knockout stage	—	4−5	—	6−1
4	Isle of Wight	3	0	0	0	3	6	20	−14	0		2−7	—	—	—

Source: BSWW

=== Group I ===
Pos	Team	Pld	W	W+	WP	L	GF	GA	GD	Pts	Qualification	ATL	VIA	ETA	ALA
1	Atlas AO	3	2	1	0	0	18	7	+11	8	Knockout stage	—	6−5*	—	5−1
2	Viareggio	3	2	0	0	1	18	9	+9	6	Knockout stage	—	—	9−0	4−3
3	AS Étaples	3	1	0	0	2	6	19	−13	3	Knockout stage	1−7	—	—	—
4	Alanya Belediyespor	3	0	0	0	3	7	14	−7	0		—	—	3−5	—

Source: BSWW

== Knockout stage ==
The draw for the round of 32, and allocation of ties to the bracket, took place after the conclusion of all group stage matches on 14 June.

=== Round of 32 ===
Matches double as EW Challenge semi-finals

Matches took place on 15 June (save for the Challenge matches which took place on 14 June).

Team 1	Score	Team 2
Pisa 2014	5–2	Spartak Varna
Rostocker Robben	3–4	Marbella
Atlas AO	6–5	Newteam Brussels
Marseille BT	3–2	La Grande-Motte Pyramide
Braga	14–2	AS Étaples
Varzim	6–2	ES Brainoise
Artur Music	8–1	Nõmme
ACD O Sótão	6–3	Nacional
Levante	6–2	Nistru Chișinău
Huelva	4–3 (a.e.t.)	Riga
Pafos	3–7	VIT Kyiv
Viareggio	9–0	Napoli Patron
Kfar Qassem	5–3	Naxos
Real Münster	4–2	Bohemians 1905
Marseille Minots	9–6	Buarcos 2017
ACD O Sótão B	3–3 (a.e.t.); 3–1 (p)	Nazaré 2022

=== Round of 16 onwards ===
Match doubles as EW Challenge final

Round of 16
16 June; Report
Pisa 2014	4
Marbella	3
16 June; Report
Atlas AO	9
Marseille BT	5
16 June; Report
Braga	8
Varzim	1
16 June; Report
Artur Music	3 (4)
ACD O Sótão (p)	3 (5)
16 June; Report
Levante	3
Huelva	4
16 June; Report
VIT Kyiv (p)	4 (4)
Viareggio	4 (3)
16 June; Report
Kfar Qassem	6
Real Münster	5
15 June; Report
Marseille Minots	9
ACD O Sótão B	5

Quarterfinals
16 June; Report
Pisa 2014	3
Atlas AO	1
16 June; Report
Braga	2
ACD O Sótão	3
16 June; Report
Huelva	6
VIT Kyiv	2
16 June; Report
Kfar Qassem	9
Marseille Minots	2

Semi-finals
17 June; Report
Pisa 2014	3
ACD O Sótão	2
17 June; Report
Huelva	2
Kfar Qassem	4
5th–8th semi-finals
17 June; Report
Atlas AO	3
Braga	5
17 June; Report
VIT Kyiv	8
Marseille Minots	4

Final
18 June; Report
Pisa 2014	2 (3)
Kfar Qassem (p)	2 (5)
3rd place match
18 June; Report
ACD O Sótão	3
Huelva	2
5th place match
18 June; Report
Braga	7
VIT Kyiv	8
7th place match
18 June; Report
Atlas AO	7
Marseille Minots	2

== Awards ==
The following individual awards were presented after the final.

Top scorer(s)
(Brazil) Bokinha ( (Greece) Atlas AO)
18 goals
Best player
(Brazil) Bruno Xavier ( Pisa 2014)
Best goalkeeper
(Switzerland) Eliott Mounoud ( Kfar Qassem)

== Top goalscorers ==
Players with at least five goals are listed; goals scored in the Euro Winners Challenge matches are not included.

18 goals

- (Brazil) Bokinha ( (Greece) Atlas AO)

15 goals

- (Brazil) Gerlan Silva ( (Spain) Huelva)

14 goals

- (Brazil) Edson Hulk ( (Cyprus) Pafos)

12 goals

- (Portugal) Léo Martins ( (Portugal) Braga)

11 goals

- (Brazil) Raphael ( (Ukraine) VIT Kyiv)
- (Portugal) Jordan Santos ( (Portugal) Braga)
- (Portugal) Miguel Pintado ( (Portugal) Braga)

10 goals

- (Switzerland) Glenn Hodel ( (Israel) Kfar Qassem)

8 goals

- (Brazil) Alisson ( (Italy) Viareggio)
- (Israel) Sameh Moreb ( (Israel) Kfar Qassem)
- (Ukraine) Maksym Voitok ( (Ukraine) VIT Kyiv)
- (Greece) Konstantinos Tsitsaris ( (Greece) Atlas AO)
- (Portugal) Duarte Vivo ( (Portugal) ACD O Sótão)

7 goals

- (Romania) Marian Măciucă ( (Bulgaria) Spartak Varna)
- (Italy) Paolo Palmacci ( (Italy) Naxos)
- (Brazil) Victor Hugo ( (Ukraine) Artur Music)
- (Italy) Stefano Marinai ( (Italy) Pisa 2014)

6 goals

- (Denmark) Axel Damm ( (Germany) Rostocker Robben)
- (Ukraine) Dmytro Voitenko ( (Ukraine) Artur Music)
- (Germany) Joscha Metzler ( (Germany) Real Münster)
- (Brazil) Ryan Rangel ( (Ukraine) VIT Kyiv)
- (Italy) Raffaele Ortolini ( (Italy) Pisa 2014)
- (Brazil) Cami ( (Italy) Pisa 2014)
- (Brazil) Deiverson Dmais ( (Israel) Kfar Qassem)
- (Japan) Takuya Akaguma ( (Spain) Huelva)
- (Ukraine) Yurii Shcherytsia ( (Ukraine) VIT Kyiv)
- (Brazil) Antônio ( (Greece) Atlas AO)
- (Brazil) Benjamin Jr. ( (Portugal) ACD O Sótão)
- (Brazil) Thanger Alves ( (Portugal) Braga)

5 goals

- (Portugal) Diogo Oliveira ( (Portugal) GRAP)
- (France) Sébastien Huck ( (France) Grande-Motte Pyramide)
- (Portugal) André Pinto ( (Portugal) Nacional)
- (Czech Republic) Lukáš Trampota ( (Czech Republic) Bohemians 1905)
- (Moldova) Leonid Podlesnov ( (Moldova) Nistru Chișinău)
- (Brazil) Miguel Junior ( (Cyprus) Pafos)
- (Brazil) Igor Melo ( (Ukraine) Artur Music)
- (Ukraine) Oleg Zborovskyi ( (Ukraine) Artur Music)
- (Portugal) Filipe Santos ( (Portugal) Varzim)
- (Spain) Eduard Suarez ( (Germany) Real Münster)
- (Italy) Sebastiano Paterniti ( (France) Marseille BT)
- (Argentina) Lucas Ponzetti ( (Spain) Marbella)
- (Spain) Pedro Juanito ( (Spain) Marbella)
- (Brazil) Pedrinho ( (Spain) Levante)
- (Spain) Kuman ( (Spain) Levante)
- (Brazil) Zé Lucas ( (Italy) Viareggio)
- (Japan) Ozu Moreira ( (Italy) Viareggio)
- (Spain) Dani Haro ( (Spain) Huelva)
- (Ukraine) Ivan Glutskyi ( (Ukraine) VIT Kyiv)
- (Switzerland) Noël Ott ( (Israel) Kfar Qassem)
- (Israel) Ahmad Gabarin ( (Israel) Kfar Qassem)
- (Greece) Spyridon Venardos ( (Greece) Atlas AO)
- (Spain) David Ardil ( (Portugal) ACD O Sótão)
- (Portugal) Bê Martins ( (Portugal) Braga)

Source: BSWW

== Final standings ==
Rank	Team	Result
1	Kfar Qassem	Champions (1st title)
2	Pisa 2014	Runners-up
3	ACD O Sótão	Third place
4	Huelva	
5	VIT Kyiv	
6	Braga	
7	Atlas AO	
8	Marseille Minots	
9–16	Artur Music	Eliminated in the Round of 16
9–16	ACD O Sótão B	Eliminated in the Round of 16
9–16	Levante	Eliminated in the Round of 16
9–16	Marbella	Eliminated in the Round of 16
9–16	Marseille BT	Eliminated in the Round of 16
9–16	Real Münster	Eliminated in the Round of 16
9–16	Varzim	Eliminated in the Round of 16
9–16	Viareggio	Eliminated in the Round of 16
17–32
17–32	AS Étaples	Eliminated in the Round of 32
17–32	Bohemians 1905	Eliminated in the Round of 32
17–32	Buarcos 2017	Eliminated in the Round of 32
17–32	ES Brainoise	Eliminated in the Round of 32
17–32	Grande-Motte Pyramide	Eliminated in the Round of 32
17–32	Nacional	Eliminated in the Round of 32
17–32	Napoli Patron	Eliminated in the Round of 32
17–32	Naxos	Eliminated in the Round of 32
17–32	Nazaré 2022	Eliminated in the Round of 32
17–32	Newteam Brussels	Eliminated in the Round of 32
17–32	Nistru Chișinău	Eliminated in the Round of 32
17–32	Nõmme	Eliminated in the Round of 32
17–32	Pafos	Eliminated in the Round of 32
17–32	Riga	Eliminated in the Round of 32
17–32	Rostocker Robben	Eliminated in the Round of 32
17–32	Spartak Varna	Eliminated in the Round of 32

== See also ==
- 2023 Women's Euro Winners Cup
