= Euro Winners Challenge =

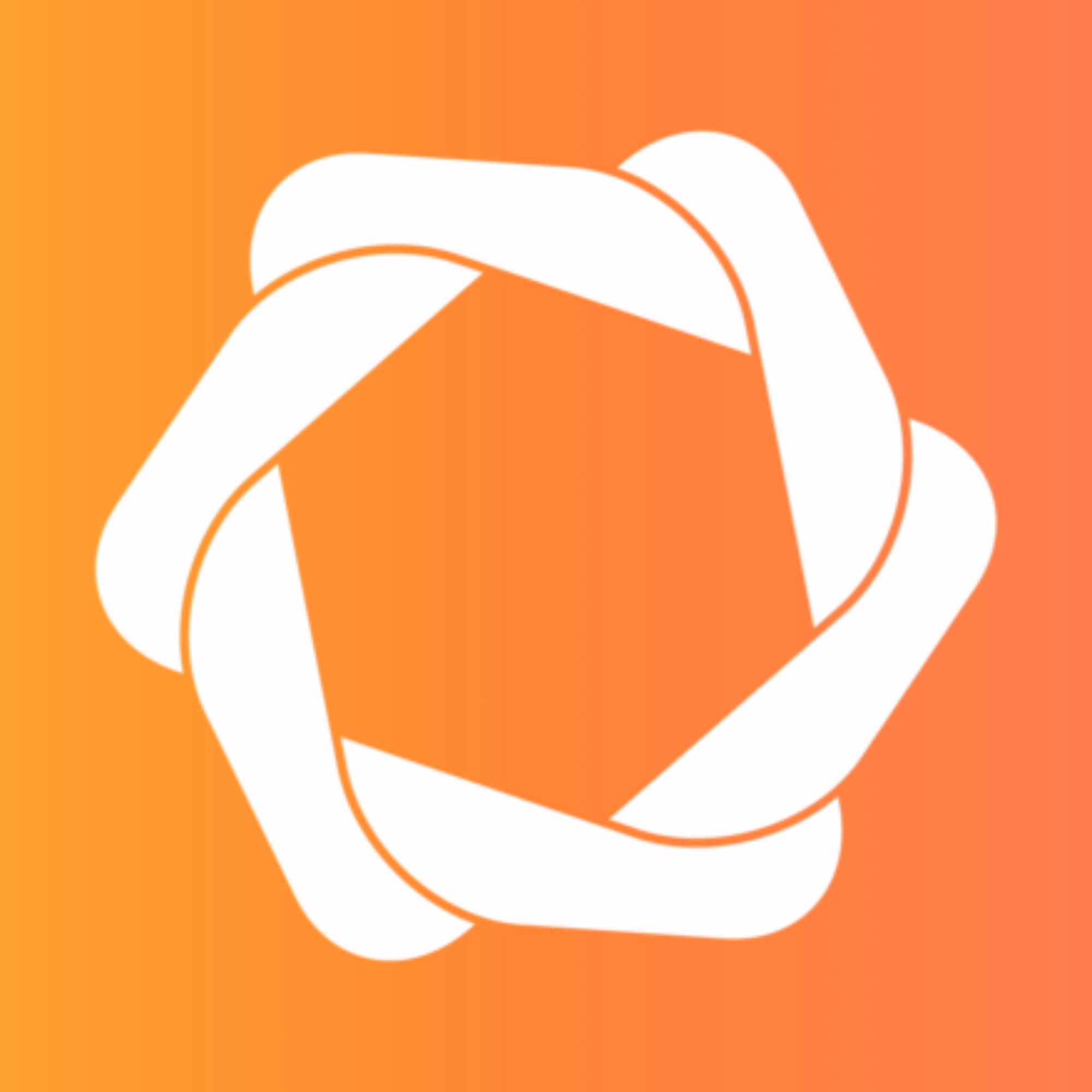
- BSWW Euro Winners Challenge logo
- Organiser(s): BSWW
- Founded: 25 April 2018; 8 years ago
- Region: Europe
- Teams: 20
- Related competitions: Euro Winners Cup; Women's Euro Winners Cup
- Current champions: (Portugal) GD Sesimbra
- Website: BSWW Euro Winners Challenge

The Euro Winners Challenge (ECC) is the qualification tournament of the Euro Winners Cup, the annual continental beach soccer club competition. It is contested by additional teams that don't meet the criteria to qualify directly to the EWC. The first edition was held in Portugal in 2018 as Nazaré Cup.

== History ==
The Beach Soccer Worldwide created the 2018 Nazaré Cup as a Preliminary tournament for the 2018 Euro Winners Cup contested by 32 club in Nazaré from 25 to 31 May with the final that ran in parallel to the EWC Round of 16. In 2019 the tournament was re-branded as Euro Winners Challenge while it kept to work as additional qualification tournament as the UEFA Intertoto Cup in association football and the European Rugby Continental Shield in rugby union. In 2024 the ECC changed its format and became a true secondary continental competition as a sort of beach soccer UEFA Europa League: a one week long tournament that qualify the winner to the following Euro Winners Cup.

== Champions ==
Year	Location	No. of clubs	Final				Semifinalist	
Year	Location	No. of clubs	Winners	Result	Runners-up	EWC	Lost to Winner	Lost to Runnes-up
2018	Nazaré, Portugal, Portugal	32	BSC Kristall (Russia)	3-2	(Israel) Kfar Qassem BS	Final	(Italy) Viareggio BS	(Portugal) Casa Benfica de Loures
2019	Nazaré, Portugal, Portugal	36	BSC Lokomotiv Moscow (Russia)	6-1	(Russia) CSKA Moscow	Quarterfinal	(Portugal) CF Chelas	(Portugal) GD Sesimbra
2022	Nazaré, Portugal, Portugal	26	Rosh HaAyin (Israel)	8-7^{[A]}	(Greece) Napoli Patron	Quarterfinal	(Germany) Real Münster	(Portugal) Varzim
2023	Nazaré, Portugal, Portugal	15	Marseille Minots (France)	9-5	(Portugal) ACD O Sótão B	Quarterfinal	(Portugal) Buarcos 2017	(Portugal) Nazaré 2022
2024	Nazaré, Portugal, Portugal	20	Leixões S.C. (Portugal)	4-3	(Portugal) GD Sesimbra	2025 EWC	(Portugal) União Ericeirense	(Portugal) Vila Flor
2025	Nazaré, Portugal, Portugal	20	GD Alfarim (Portugal)	4-3	(Germany) Real Münster	2026 EWC	(France) Cevennes	(Portugal) Vila Flor
2026	Nazaré, Portugal, Portugal	16	G.D. Sesimbra (Portugal)	9-8^{[B]}	(France) Marseille BT	2027 EWC	(Italy) Naxos BS	(Portugal) G.D.U. Ericeirense

A. Rosh HaAyin won the penalty shootout 7–6.
B. GD Sesimbra won the penalty shootout 5-4.

=== Awards ===
Year	Top goalscorer(s)	Goals	Matches	Best player	Best goalkeeper
2018	(Italy) Gabriele Gori (Viareggio BS)	15	6		
2019	(Russia) Boris Nikonorov (L. Moscow)	9	7		
2022	(Japan) Takaaki (Real Münster)	12	6		
2023	(Portugal) F. Guerra (AD Buarcos)	14	6		
2024	(Brazil) Matheus (Leixões SC)	12	6	(Brazil) Pedrinho (Leixões SC)	(Portugal) Ruben Regufe (Leixões SC)
2025	(Portugal) Léo Martins (Real Münster)	14	6	(Portugal) João Cabral (GD Alfarim)	(Portugal) João Oliveira (GD Alfarim)
2026	(Brazil) Pedro Lucas (Marseille BT) (France) Romain Billet (Mouilleron SF)	14	6	(Brazil) Pedro Lucas (Marseille BT)	(Portugal) João Oliveira (GD Sesimbra)

== See also ==
- Euro Winners Cup
- World Winners Cup
- Women's Euro Winners Cup
