= 2025 Euro Winners Cup =

Tournament details
- Host country: Portugal
- Dates: 8–15 June
- Teams: 36 (from 1 confederation)
- Venues: 4 (in 1 host city)

Final positions
- Champions: Catania (1st title)
- Runners-up: Kfar Qassem
- Third place: TSOR Mogilev
- Fourth place: Marbella

Origins of the clubs in the 2025 Euro Winners Cup group stage.
Groups key: A; B; C; D; E; F; G; H; I.

The 2025 Euro Winners Cup was the thirteenth edition of the Euro Winners Cup (EWC), an annual continental beach soccer tournament for men's top-division European clubs. The championship is widely viewed as beach soccer's rudimentary version of the better known UEFA Champions League in its parent sport, association football.

Organised by Beach Soccer Worldwide (BSWW), the tournament was held in Nazaré, Portugal, from 8 to 15 June.

The event began with a round robin group stage. At its conclusion, the best teams progressed to the knockout stage, a series of single elimination games to determine the winners, starting with the Round of 16 and ending with the final. Consolation matches were also played to determine other final rankings.

Braga were the defending champions but did not enter this year due to the club's activities being put on indefinite hiatus in October 2024. The title was won by Italian club Catania, who claimed their first title.

== Teams ==
=== Qualification ===
Qualification for the competition is similar to the UEFA Champions League, whereby clubs qualify via their country’s national beach soccer league (being a country which is a member association of UEFA) or through the victory (and the final) in the 2024 Euro Winners Challenge, the second continental competition.

The exact number of clubs which qualify from each association depends on the perceived "strength" of their country’s league. BSWW determine the strength of each league by analysing the performance of all clubs in the EWC on a country-by-country basis over the previous five editions; a points-based ranking is produced from the data. From the most recent edition of their respective leagues, the best performing nations in the ranking are permitted to enter multiple top placing clubs (being their league champions and one or more runners-up), whilst the worst performing are allowed to enter just one club (being their league champions). This is similar in concept to that of the UEFA coefficient ranking.

Eligible clubs may choose not to, or are unable to participate. Thus, in reality, some countries fill their quota with clubs placed lower down in their league, don’t claim all their slots, sometimes fill none of their slots at all, and sometimes unclaimed slots are transferred to other associations at the discretion of BSWW.

=== Entrants ===
36 clubs from 24 different nations enter the event.

In accordance with sanctions imposed by FIFA and UEFA in 2022 in response to the Russian invasion of Ukraine, clubs from Russia remain banned from entering this year.

Key: H: Host club \ TH: Title holders \ Chl: Qualified as winners or runners-up of the 2024 Euro Winners Challenge

Group stage
| Portugal (4) | O Sótão (H) | Italy (2) | Catania | Finland (1) | Hobby |
| Portugal (4) | GRAP | Italy (2) | Pisa | Georgia (1) | Batumi |
| Portugal (4) | Leixões (Chl) | Israel (2) | Kfar Qassem | Greece (1) | Napoli Patron |
| Portugal (4) | Sesimbra (Chl) | Israel (2) | Rosh HaAyin | Kazakhstan (1) | Malaysari |
| France (3) | Marseille BT | Ukraine (2) | Sunrise Kyiv | Malta (1) | Hamrun |
| France (3) | Marseille Minots | Ukraine (2) | Vybir | Moldova (1) | Nistru Chișinău |
| France (3) | Montpellier | Belarus (1) | TSOR Mogilev | Netherlands (1) | Zeeland |
| Germany (3) | Bavaria Beach Bazis | Bulgaria (1) | Spartak Varna | Norway (1) | KFUM Stavanger |
| Germany (3) | Hertha Berlin | Cyprus (1) | Paphos | Slovakia (1) | Hustý |
| Germany (3) | Rostocker Robben | Czech Republic (1) | Slavia Prague | Turkey (1) | Gümüldür Spor |
| Spain (3) | Málaga | Denmark (1) | Copenhagen | | |
| Spain (3) | Marbella | England (1) | Portsmouth | | |
| Spain (3) | Recreativo de Huelva | Estonia (1) | SK Augur | | |

== Group stage ==
All group winners, along with the best runners-up, progress to the round of 16.

The worst four runners-up progress to a play-off round to decide the final two round of 16 berths.

All third-placed and fourth-placed teams are consigned to a set of consolation matches to determine final placements.

Key

- Qualification to the round of 16
- Qualification to the play-off round
- Consigned to placement matches
- Withdrew; opponents awarded walkovers

=== Group A ===
| Pos | Team | Pld | W | W+ | WP | L | GF | GA | GD | Pts |
|---|---|---|---|---|---|---|---|---|---|---|
| 1 | Rosh HaAyin | 3 | 3 | 0 | 0 | 0 | 25 | 10 | +15 | 9 |
| 2 | O Sótão (H) | 3 | 2 | 0 | 0 | 1 | 12 | 9 | +3 | 6 |
| 3 | Zeeland | 3 | 0 | 1 | 0 | 2 | 9 | 15 | −6 | 2 |
| 4 | Gümüldür Spor | 3 | 0 | 0 | 0 | 3 | 6 | 18 | −12 | 0 |

Source: BSWW
(H) Host

| 8 June | Zeeland (Netherlands) | 3–8 | (Israel) Rosh HaAyin |
| 8 June | Gümüldür Spor (Turkey) | 1–3 | (Portugal) O Sótão |
| 9 June | Rosh HaAyin (Israel) | 10–1 | (Turkey) Gümüldür Spor |
| 9 June | O Sótão (Portugal) | 3–1 | (Netherlands) Zeeland |
| 10 June | Zeeland (Netherlands) | 5–4 (a.e.t.) | (Turkey) Gümüldür Spor |
| 10 June | O Sótão (Portugal) | 6–7 | (Israel) Rosh HaAyin |

=== Group B ===
| Pos | Team | Pld | W | W+ | WP | L | GF | GA | GD | Pts |
|---|---|---|---|---|---|---|---|---|---|---|
| 1 | Pisa | 3 | 3 | 0 | 0 | 0 | 14 | 2 | +12 | 9 |
| 2 | Pafos | 3 | 2 | 0 | 0 | 1 | 9 | 5 | +4 | 6 |
| 3 | Sesimbra | 3 | 1 | 0 | 0 | 2 | 5 | 9 | −4 | 3 |
| 4 | Batumi | 3 | 0 | 0 | 0 | 3 | 3 | 15 | −12 | 0 |

Source: BSWW

| 8 June | Sesimbra (Portugal) | 0–3 | (Cyprus) Pafos |
| 8 June | Batumi (Georgia (country)) | 0–6 | (Italy) Pisa |
| 9 June | Pafos (Cyprus) | 5–2 | (Georgia (country)) Batumi |
| 9 June | Pisa (Italy) | 5–1 | (Portugal) Sesimbra |
| 10 June | Sesimbra (Portugal) | 4–1 | (Georgia (country)) Batumi |
| 10 June | Pisa (Italy) | 3–1 | (Cyprus) Pafos |

=== Group C ===
| Pos | Team | Pld | W | W+ | WP | L | GF | GA | GD | Pts |
|---|---|---|---|---|---|---|---|---|---|---|
| 1 | Sunrise Kyiv | 3 | 3 | 0 | 0 | 0 | 23 | 5 | +18 | 9 |
| 2 | GRAP | 3 | 2 | 0 | 0 | 1 | 15 | 11 | +4 | 6 |
| 3 | Malaysari | 3 | 1 | 0 | 0 | 2 | 7 | 20 | −13 | 3 |
| 4 | Nistru Chișinău | 3 | 0 | 0 | 0 | 3 | 0 | 9 | −9 | 0 |

Source: BSWW

| 8 June | Sunrise Kyiv (Ukraine) | 3–0 w/o | (Moldova) Nistru Chișinău |
| 8 June | Malaysari (Kazakhstan) | 3–8 | (Portugal) GRAP |
| 9 June | Nistru Chișinău (Moldova) | 0–3 w/o | (Kazakhstan) Malaysari |
| 9 June | GRAP (Portugal) | 4–8 | (Ukraine) Sunrise Kyiv |
| 10 June | Sunrise Kyiv (Ukraine) | 12–1 | (Kazakhstan) Malaysari |
| 10 June | GRAP (Portugal) | 3–0 w/o | (Moldova) Nistru Chișinău |

=== Group D ===
| Pos | Team | Pld | W | W+ | WP | L | GF | GA | GD | Pts |
|---|---|---|---|---|---|---|---|---|---|---|
| 1 | Catania | 3 | 2 | 1 | 0 | 0 | 29 | 3 | +26 | 8 |
| 2 | Napoli Patron | 3 | 2 | 0 | 0 | 1 | 16 | 4 | +12 | 6 |
| 3 | Hertha Berlin | 3 | 1 | 0 | 0 | 2 | 6 | 23 | −17 | 3 |
| 4 | Hobby | 3 | 0 | 0 | 0 | 3 | 3 | 24 | −21 | 0 |

Source: BSWW

| 8 June | Hobby (Finland) | 1–5 | (Greece) Napoli Patron |
| 8 June | Hertha Berlin (Germany) | 0–13 | (Italy) Catania |
| 9 June | Napoli Patron (Greece) | 10–1 | (Germany) Hertha Berlin |
| 9 June | Catania (Italy) | 14–2 | (Finland) Hobby |
| 10 June | Hobby (Finland) | 0–5 | (Germany) Hertha Berlin |
| 10 June | Catania (Italy) | 2–1 (a.e.t.) | (Greece) Napoli Patron |

=== Group E ===
| Pos | Team | Pld | W | W+ | WP | L | GF | GA | GD | Pts |
|---|---|---|---|---|---|---|---|---|---|---|
| 1 | Kfar Qassem | 3 | 3 | 0 | 0 | 0 | 29 | 7 | +22 | 9 |
| 2 | Leixões | 3 | 2 | 0 | 0 | 1 | 13 | 11 | +2 | 6 |
| 3 | Slavia Prague | 3 | 1 | 0 | 0 | 2 | 11 | 22 | −11 | 3 |
| 4 | KFUM Stavanger | 3 | 0 | 0 | 0 | 3 | 9 | 22 | −13 | 0 |

Source: BSWW

| 8 June | Slavia Prague (Czech Republic) | 1–5 | (Portugal) Leixões |
| 8 June | KFUM Stavanger (Norway) | 1–10 | (Israel) Kfar Qassem |
| 9 June | Leixões (Portugal) | 6–4 | (Norway) KFUM Stavanger |
| 9 June | Kfar Qassem (Israel) | 13–4 | (Czech Republic) Slavia Prague |
| 10 June | Slavia Prague (Czech Republic) | 6–4 | (Norway) KFUM Stavanger |
| 10 June | Kfar Qassem (Israel) | 6–2 | (Portugal) Leixões |

=== Group F ===
| Pos | Team | Pld | W | W+ | WP | L | GF | GA | GD | Pts |
|---|---|---|---|---|---|---|---|---|---|---|
| 1 | TSOR Mogilev | 3 | 2 | 0 | 0 | 1 | 18 | 6 | +12 | 6 |
| 2 | Copenhagen | 3 | 2 | 0 | 0 | 1 | 13 | 10 | +3 | 6 |
| 3 | Bavaria Beach Bazis | 3 | 1 | 1 | 0 | 1 | 14 | 12 | +2 | 5 |
| 4 | Hamrun | 3 | 0 | 0 | 0 | 3 | 6 | 23 | −17 | 0 |

Source: BSWW

| 8 June | TSOR Mogilev (Belarus) | 5–1 | (Denmark) Copenhagen |
| 8 June | Hamrun (Malta) | 3–7 | (Germany) Bavaria Beach Bazis |
| 9 June | Copenhagen (Denmark) | 7–3 | (Malta) Hamrun |
| 9 June | Bavaria Beach Bazis (Germany) | 5–4 (a.e.t.) | (Belarus) TSOR Mogilev |
| 10 June | TSOR Mogilev (Belarus) | 9–0 | (Malta) Hamrun |
| 10 June | Bavaria Beach Bazis (Germany) | 2–5 | (Denmark) Copenhagen |

=== Group G ===
| Pos | Team | Pld | W | W+ | WP | L | GF | GA | GD | Pts |
|---|---|---|---|---|---|---|---|---|---|---|
| 1 | Málaga | 3 | 3 | 0 | 0 | 0 | 23 | 4 | +19 | 9 |
| 2 | Rostocker Robben | 3 | 2 | 0 | 0 | 1 | 13 | 8 | +5 | 6 |
| 3 | Montpellier | 3 | 1 | 0 | 0 | 2 | 18 | 12 | +6 | 3 |
| 4 | Hustý | 3 | 0 | 0 | 0 | 3 | 5 | 35 | −30 | 0 |

Source: BSWW

| 8 June | Hustý (Slovakia) | 2–7 | (Germany) Rostocker Robben |
| 8 June | Montpellier (France) | 2–5 | (Spain) Málaga |
| 9 June | Rostocker Robben (Germany) | 5–3 | (France) Montpellier |
| 9 June | Málaga (Spain) | 15–1 | (Slovakia) Hustý |
| 10 June | Hustý (Slovakia) | 2–13 | (France) Montpellier |
| 10 June | Málaga (Spain) | 3–1 | (Germany) Rostocker Robben |

=== Group H ===
| Pos | Team | Pld | W | W+ | WP | L | GF | GA | GD | Pts |
|---|---|---|---|---|---|---|---|---|---|---|
| 1 | SK Augur | 3 | 2 | 0 | 0 | 1 | 21 | 12 | +9 | 6 |
| 2 | Recreativo de Huelva | 3 | 2 | 0 | 0 | 1 | 18 | 10 | +8 | 6 |
| 3 | Marseille Minots | 3 | 2 | 0 | 0 | 1 | 17 | 16 | +1 | 6 |
| 4 | Portsmouth | 3 | 0 | 0 | 0 | 3 | 6 | 24 | −18 | 0 |

Source: BSWW

| 8 June | Portsmouth (England) | 1–9 | (Spain) Recreativo de Huelva |
| 8 June | SK Augur (Estonia) | 9–5 | (France) Marseille Minots |
| 9 June | Recreativo de Huelva (Spain) | 5–4 | (Estonia) SK Augur |
| 9 June | Marseille Minots (France) | 7–3 | (England) Portsmouth |
| 10 June | Portsmouth (England) | 2–8 | (Estonia) SK Augur |
| 10 June | Marseille Minots (France) | 5–4 | (Spain) Recreativo de Huelva |

=== Group I ===
| Pos | Team | Pld | W | W+ | WP | L | GF | GA | GD | Pts |
|---|---|---|---|---|---|---|---|---|---|---|
| 1 | Marseille BT | 3 | 3 | 0 | 0 | 0 | 10 | 4 | +6 | 9 |
| 2 | Marbella | 3 | 1 | 1 | 0 | 1 | 11 | 8 | +3 | 5 |
| 3 | Vybir | 3 | 1 | 0 | 0 | 2 | 9 | 9 | 0 | 3 |
| 4 | Spartak Varna | 3 | 0 | 0 | 0 | 3 | 0 | 9 | −9 | 0 |

Source: BSWW

| 8 June | Marbella (Spain) | 2–4 | (France) Marseille BT |
| 8 June | Spartak Varna (Bulgaria) | 0–3 w/o | (Ukraine) Vybir |
| 9 June | Marseille BT (France) | 3–0 w/o | (Bulgaria) Spartak Varna |
| 9 June | Vybir (Ukraine) | 4–6 (a.e.t.) | (Spain) Marbella |
| 10 June | Marbella (Spain) | 3–0 w/o | (Bulgaria) Spartak Varna |
| 10 June | Vybir (Ukraine) | 2–3 | (France) Marseille BT |

== Placement matches ==
Matches take place on 11 June.

| 33rd place | Hobby (Finland) | 2–6 | (Slovakia) Hustý |
| 31st place | Hamrun (Malta) | 0–3 w/o | (England) Portsmouth |
| 29th place | Batumi (Georgia (country)) | 6–1 | (Norway) KFUM Stavanger |
| 27th place | Zeeland (Netherlands) | 1–7 | (Turkey) Gümüldür Spor |
| 25th place | Malaysari (Kazakhstan) | 2–6 | (Germany) Hertha Berlin |
| 23rd place | Sesimbra (Portugal) | 5–2 | (Czech Republic) Slavia Prague |
| 21st place | Montpellier (France) | 5–4 | (Ukraine) Vybir |
| 19th place | Marseille Minots (France) | 5–0 | (Germany) Bavaria Beach Bazis |

== Knockout stage ==
=== Play-off round ===
The two winners qualify for the Round of 16.

Play-offs for Round of 16
11 June; Report
(Denmark) Copenhagen | 1
(Spain) Marbella | 6
11 June; Report
(Portugal) O Sótão | 7
(Portugal) Leixões | 1

Qualified for Round of 16
(Spain) Marbella
(Portugal) O Sótão

17th place match
12 June; Report
(Denmark) Copenhagen | 7
(Portugal) Leixões | 6

=== Bracket ===
The draw for the round of 16 took place on 11 June.

Round of 16 losers placement
15th place – 13 June; Report
(Portugal) GRAP | 2
(Cyprus) Pafos | 5
13th place – 13 June; Report
(Portugal) O Sótão | 5
(Germany) Rostocker Robben | 3
11th place – 13 June; Report
(Estonia) SK Augur (p) | 3 (3)
(Spain) Recreativo de Huelva | 3 (0)
9th place – 13 June; Report
(Spain) Málaga | 3
(Greece) Napoli Patron | 1

Round of 16
12 June; Report
(Belarus) TSOR Mogilev | 5
(Portugal) GRAP | 2
12 June; Report
(Israel) Rosh HaAyin | 6
(Germany) Rostocker Robben | 2
12 June; Report
(Italy) Catania | 4
(Spain) Recreativo de Huelva | 2
12 June; Report
(Ukraine) Sunrise Kyiv | 5
(Greece) Napoli Patron | 2
12 June; Report
(France) Marseille BT | 2
(Portugal) O Sótão | 1
12 June; Report
(Israel) Kfar Qassem | 5
(Cyprus) Pafos | 0
12 June; Report
(Spain) Málaga | 5 (2)
(Spain) Marbella (p) | 5 (3)
12 June; Report
(Italy) Pisa | 4
(Estonia) SK Augur | 2

Quarterfinals
13 June; Report
(Belarus) TSOR Mogilev | 4
(Israel) Rosh HaAyin | 2
13 June; Report
(Italy) Catania | 3
(Ukraine) Sunrise Kyiv | 2
13 June; Report
(France) Marseille BT | 2
(Israel) Kfar Qassem | 6
13 June; Report
(Spain) Marbella | 4
(Italy) Pisa | 3

Semi-finals
14 June; Report
(Belarus) TSOR Mogilev | 2
(Italy) Catania | 7
14 June; Report
(Israel) Kfar Qassem | 7
(Spain) Marbella | 3
5th–8th semi-finals
14 June; Report
(Israel) Rosh HaAyin | 6
(Ukraine) Sunrise Kyiv | 5
14 June; Report
(France) Marseille BT | 6
(Italy) Pisa | 4

Final
15 June; Report
(Italy) Catania | 6
(Israel) Kfar Qassem | 1
3rd place match
15 June; Report
(Belarus) TSOR Mogilev (p) | 2 (5)
(Spain) Marbella | 2 (4)
5th place match
15 June; Report
(Israel) Rosh HaAyin | 6
(France) Marseille BT | 5
7th place match
15 June; Report
(Ukraine) Sunrise Kyiv | 3
(Italy) Pisa | 4

== Final standings ==
| Rank | Team | Result |
|---|---|---|
| 1st place, gold medalist(s) | Catania BS | Champions (1st title) |
| 2nd place, silver medalist(s) | Kfar Qassem | Runners-up |
| 3rd place, bronze medalist(s) | TSOR Mogilev | Third place |
| 4 | Marbella | 4th place |
| 5 | Rosh HaAyin | Eliminated in the Quarter-finals |
| 6 | Marseille BT | Eliminated in the Quarter-finals |
| 7 | Pisa | Eliminated in the Quarter-finals |
| 8 | Sunrise Kyiv | Eliminated in the Quarter-finals |
| 9 | Málaga | Eliminated in the Round of 16 |
| 10 | Napoli Patron | Eliminated in the Round of 16 |
| 11 | SK Augur | Eliminated in the Round of 16 |
| 12 | Recreativo de Huelva | Eliminated in the Round of 16 |
| 13 | O Sótão | Eliminated in the Round of 16 |
| 14 | Rostocker Robben | Eliminated in the Round of 16 |
| 15 | Pafos | Eliminated in the Round of 16 |
| 16 | GRAP | Eliminated in the Round of 16 |
| 17 | Copenhagen | Eliminated in the Play-off Round |
| 18 | Leixões | Eliminated in the Play-off Round |
| 19 | Marseille Minots | Eliminated in the Group Stage |
| 20 | Bavaria Beach Bazis | Eliminated in the Group Stage |
| 21 | Montpellier | Eliminated in the Group Stage |
| 22 | Vybir | Eliminated in the Group Stage |
| 23 | Sesimbra | Eliminated in the Group Stage |
| 24 | Slavia Prague | Eliminated in the Group Stage |
| 25 | Hertha Berlin | Eliminated in the Group Stage |
| 26 | Malaysari | Eliminated in the Group Stage |
| 27 | Gümüldür Spor | Eliminated in the Group Stage |
| 28 | Zeeland | Eliminated in the Group Stage |
| 29 | Batumi | Eliminated in the Group Stage |
| 30 | KFUM Stavanger | Eliminated in the Group Stage |
| 31 | Portsmouth | Eliminated in the Group Stage |
| 32 | Hamrun | Eliminated in the Group Stage |
| 33 | Hustý | Eliminated in the Group Stage |
| 34 | Hobby | Eliminated in the Group Stage |
| — | Nistru Chișinău | Withdrew |
| — | Spartak Varna | Withdrew |

== See also ==
- 2025 Women's Euro Winners Cup
- 2025 Euro Winners Challenge
- 2024–25 UEFA Futsal Champions League
