= 2022 Euro Winners Cup =

Tournament details
- Host country: Portugal
- Dates: 3–12 June
- Teams: 60 (from 1 confederation)
- Venues: 3 (in 1 host city)

Final positions
- Champions: (Portugal) Benfica Loures (1st title)
- Runners-up: (Portugal) Braga
- Third place: (Israel) Kfar Qassem
- Fourth place: (France) GM Pyramide

Tournament statistics
- Matches played: 154
- Goals scored: 1,150 (7.47 per match)

The 2022 Euro Winners Cup was the tenth edition of the Euro Winners Cup (EWC), an annual continental beach soccer tournament for men's top-division European clubs. The championship is the sport's version of the better known UEFA Champions League in association football.

Organised by Beach Soccer Worldwide (BSWW), the tournament was held in Nazaré, Portugal from 3–12 June.

The event began with a qualification round. The competition proper then commenced, with a round robin group stage. At its conclusion, the best teams progressed to the knockout stage, a series of single elimination games to determine the winners, starting with the round of 16 and ending with the final. Consolation matches were also played to determine other final rankings.

Kristall of Russia were the defending champions but were barred from entering the competition this year.^{[Note RUS]} The final was contended between two Portuguese clubs, Benfica Loures and Braga; the former won the competition for the first time, whilst the latter finished as runners-up for the third year straight.

== Teams ==
=== Qualification ===
Normal qualification rules returned, having been suspended for the last two editions, due to the effects of the COVID-19 pandemic in Europe.

The number of clubs which are entitled to enter automatically from each country depends on the perceived strength of their country's national league. BSWW determine the strength of each league by analysing the performance of all clubs in the EWC on a country-by-country basis over the previous five editions. A points-based ranking is produced from the data, as seen in the table below.

From the most recent edition of their country's national league:

- The first through sixth place performing nations can enter three clubs (league champions, runners-up and third-placed team).
- The seventh, eighth and ninth place performing nations can enter two clubs (league champions and runners-up).
- The tenth place and below performing nations can enter just one club, their league champions.

The above clubs take priority and are offered their country's slots first. However, if such clubs choose not to are or unable to participate, the slot is offered to the next highest placed teams from their league in turn until one accepts. Thus, in reality, some countries fill their allocated quota with clubs placed considerably lower down in their league, don't fill all their slots, or sometimes fill no slots at all.

The "host club" and defending champions also enter automatically.

Any and all clubs that don't qualify automatically, and/or are surplus to their countries allocated quotas, are entitled to enter the accompanying Euro Winners Challenge (preliminary round) to take place in the days prior to the competition proper, as a last opportunity to qualify for the EWC group stage; the best eight clubs will qualify.

Association ranking & slot allocation for 2022 Euro Winners Cup
A further 27 members of UEFA are unranked; all are entitled to enter one club.

| Rank | Association | Points | Teams |
|---|---|---|---|
| 1 | Portugal^{[Note POR]} | 6902 | 3 +1 |
| DQ | Russia^{[Note RUS]} | 6045 | 0 |
| 2 | Spain | 2719 | 3 |
| 3 | Ukraine | 1857 | 3 |
| 4 | Germany | 1835 | 3 |
| 5 | Poland | 1145 | 3 |
| 6 | Turkey | 804 | 3 |
| 7 | Italy | 762 | 2 |
| 8 | Belgium | 677 | 2 |
| 9 | France | 657 | 2 |
| 10 | Greece | 547 | 1 |
| 11 | Israel | 498 | 1 |
| 12 | Bulgaria | 457 | 1 |
| 13 | Moldova | 447 | 1 |
| 14 | Denmark | 400 | 1 |

| Rank | Association | Points | Teams |
|---|---|---|---|
| 15 | (Georgia (country)) Georgia | 319 | 1 |
| 16 | Belarus | 298 | 1 |
| 17 | Switzerland | 274 | 1 |
| 18 | Sweden | 210 | 1 |
| 19 | Romania | 161 | 1 |
| 20 | Hungary | 156 | 1 |
| 21 | (Czech Republic) Czech Republic | 146 | 1 |
| 22 | Latvia | 135 | 1 |
| 23 | England | 131 | 1 |
| 24 | Netherlands | 101 | 1 |
| 25 | Estonia | 100 | 1 |
| 26 | Finland | 45 | 1 |
| 27 | Norway | 28 | 1 |
| 28 | Kazakhstan | 16 | 1 |

- Portugal (POR): Portugal are entitled to one extra slot (+1) as the host nation.
- Russia (RUS): In accordance with sanctions imposed by FIFA and UEFA in response to the 2022 Russian invasion of Ukraine, clubs from Russia were disqualified (DQ) from entering.

=== Entrants ===
60 clubs from 22 different nations entered the event – 32 entered straight into the group stage, 28 entered into the preliminary round.

La Louvière of Belgium originally entered but were subsequently replaced by Benfica Viseu of Portugal.

Key: H: Hosts \ TH: Title holders

Group stage
| Portugal (4) | ACD O Sótão (H) | Belgium (2) | Newteam Brussels | Romania (1) | West Deva |
| Portugal (4) | Benfica Loures | Belgium (2) | BLC Vamos | Czech Republic (1) | Slavia Prague |
| Portugal (4) | Braga | France (2) | Grande-Motte Pyramide | England (1) | Portsmouth |
| Portugal (4) | Sporting CP | France (2) | Marseille BT | Estonia (1) | Augur Enemat |
| Spain (3) | Huelva | Poland (1) | Boca Gdańsk | Finland (1) | Baggio |
| Spain (3) | Levante | Turkey (1) | Alanya Belediyespor | Kazakhstan (1) | Arman Pablodar |
| Spain (3) | Melistar | Greece (1) | Atlas AO | Lithuania (1) | Dembava |
| Germany (3) | Bavaria Bazis | Israel (1) | Kfar Qassem | Slovakia (1) | Husty |
| Germany (3) | Beach Royals Düsseldorf | Bulgaria (1) | Spartak Varna | | |
| Germany (3) | Rostocker Robben | Moldova (1) | Nistru Chișinău | | |
| Italy (2) | Naxos | Denmark (1) | Copenhagen | | |
| Italy (2) | Pisa 2014 | Sweden (1) | Bemannia Stockholm | | |
Euro Winners Challenge (preliminary round)
| Portugal (16) 1/2 | ACD O Sótão B | Portugal (16) 2/2 | Nazarenos | France (2) | Marseille Minots |
| Portugal (16) 1/2 | Alfarim | Portugal (16) 2/2 | Porto Mendo | France (2) | Toulon |
| Portugal (16) 1/2 | Belenenses | Portugal (16) 2/2 | São Domingos | Greece (2) | AO Kefallinia |
| Portugal (16) 1/2 | Benfica Caldas Rainha | Portugal (16) 2/2 | Sesimbra | Greece (2) | Napoli Patron |
| Portugal (16) 1/2 | Benfica Loures B | Portugal (16) 2/2 | Varzim | Germany (1) | Real Münster |
| Portugal (16) 1/2 | Benfica Viseu | Portugal (16) 2/2 | Vilaflor | Israel (1) | Rosh HaAyin |
| Portugal (16) 1/2 | Buarcos 2017 | Belgium (4) | ES Brainoise | Moldova (1) | Djoker Chişinău |
| Portugal (16) 1/2 | Chaves | Belgium (4) | Genappe | Slovakia (1) | Zlaté Moravce |
| Portugal (16) 1/2 | GRAP | Belgium (4) | Newteam RCSB | | |
| Portugal (16) 1/2 | Nazaré 2022 | Belgium (4) | Perwez | | |

== Draw ==
The draw to split the clubs 32 and 28 clubs into groups for both the group and preliminary stages respectively took place at 12:00 CEST (UTC+2) on 6 May at BSWW's headquarters in Barcelona, Spain.

== Euro Winners Challenge (preliminary round) ==
The designation of "home" and "away" teams displayed in the results matrices is for administrative purposes only.

Matches took place from 3 to 5 June.

The group winners, plus the best runner-up, qualified to the competition proper.

Key

- ^{†} – Walkover
- * – Extra-time result
- ^{♦} – Match decided by penalty shootout

=== Group A ===
| Pos | Team | Pld | W | W+ | WP | L | GF | GA | GD | Pts | Qualification | NAP | BLN | ALF | ZLA |
|---|---|---|---|---|---|---|---|---|---|---|---|---|---|---|---|
| 1 | Napoli Patron | 3 | 3 | 0 | 0 | 0 | 16 | 11 | +5 | 9 | Group stage | — | — | 7–4 | 5–4 |
| 2 | Belenenses | 3 | 2 | 0 | 0 | 1 | 24 | 14 | +10 | 6 | | 3–4 | — | — | — |
| 3 | Alfarim | 3 | 1 | 0 | 0 | 2 | 15 | 21 | −6 | 3 | | — | 6–10 | — | — |
| 4 | Zlaté Moravce | 3 | 0 | 0 | 0 | 3 | 12 | 21 | −9 | 0 | | — | 4–10 | 4–5 | — |

Source: BSWW

=== Group B ===
| Pos | Team | Pld | W | W+ | WP | L | GF | GA | GD | Pts | Qualification | RHA | BCR | BLB | PER |
|---|---|---|---|---|---|---|---|---|---|---|---|---|---|---|---|
| 1 | Rosh HaAyin | 3 | 3 | 0 | 0 | 0 | 18 | 6 | +12 | 9 | Group stage | — | 9–3 | — | 3–0^{†} |
| 2 | Benfica Caldas Rainha | 3 | 2 | 0 | 0 | 1 | 11 | 12 | −1 | 6 | | — | — | 3–5 | — |
| 3 | Benfica Loures B | 3 | 1 | 0 | 0 | 2 | 9 | 11 | −2 | 3 | | 3–6 | — | — | — |
| 4 | Perwez | 3 | 0 | 0 | 0 | 3 | 0 | 9 | −9 | 0 | Withdrew | — | 0–3^{†} | 0–3^{†} | — |

Source: BSWW

=== Group C ===
| Pos | Team | Pld | W | W+ | WP | L | GF | GA | GD | Pts | Qualification | GRP | NAZ | MMS | NOS |
|---|---|---|---|---|---|---|---|---|---|---|---|---|---|---|---|
| 1 | GRAP | 3 | 2 | 0 | 0 | 1 | 15 | 11 | +4 | 6 | Group stage | — | — | 6–1 | 7–9* |
| 2 | Nazaré 2022 | 3 | 2 | 0 | 0 | 1 | 10 | 8 | +2 | 6 | | 1–2 | — | — | — |
| 3 | Marseille Minots | 3 | 1 | 0 | 0 | 2 | 10 | 15 | −5 | 3 | | — | 4–5 | — | 5–4 |
| 4 | Nazarenos | 3 | 0 | 1 | 0 | 2 | 15 | 16 | −1 | 2 | | — | 2–4 | — | — |

Source: BSWW

=== Group D ===
| Pos | Team | Pld | W | W+ | WP | L | GF | GA | GD | Pts | Qualification | MUN | BUA | VIL | NEW |
|---|---|---|---|---|---|---|---|---|---|---|---|---|---|---|---|
| 1 | Real Münster | 3 | 3 | 0 | 0 | 0 | 19 | 6 | +13 | 9 | Group stage | — | 3–2 | — | 13–3 |
| 2 | Buarcos 2017 | 3 | 2 | 0 | 0 | 1 | 19 | 6 | +13 | 6 | Group stage | — | — | 11–3 | — |
| 3 | Vilaflor | 3 | 1 | 0 | 0 | 2 | 9 | 18 | −9 | 3 | | 1–3 | — | — | — |
| 4 | Newteam RCSB | 3 | 0 | 0 | 0 | 3 | 7 | 24 | −17 | 0 | | — | 0–6 | 4–5 | — |

Source: BSWW

=== Group E ===
| Pos | Team | Pld | W | W+ | WP | L | GF | GA | GD | Pts | Qualification | SES | ESB | CHA | DJO |
|---|---|---|---|---|---|---|---|---|---|---|---|---|---|---|---|
| 1 | Sesimbra | 3 | 2 | 0 | 0 | 1 | 13 | 9 | +4 | 6 | Group stage | — | — | 2–4 | — |
| 2 | ES Brainoise | 3 | 2 | 0 | 0 | 1 | 19 | 15 | +4 | 6 | | 5–8 | — | 11–7 | — |
| 3 | Chaves | 3 | 2 | 0 | 0 | 1 | 14 | 13 | +1 | 6 | | — | — | — | 3–0^{†} |
| 4 | Djoker Chişinău | 3 | 0 | 0 | 0 | 3 | 0 | 9 | −9 | 0 | Withdrew | 0–3^{†} | 0–3^{†} | — | — |

Source: BSWW

=== Group F ===
| Pos | Team | Pld | W | W+ | WP | L | GF | GA | GD | Pts | Qualification | VAR | GEN | POM | TOU |
|---|---|---|---|---|---|---|---|---|---|---|---|---|---|---|---|
| 1 | Varzim | 3 | 3 | 0 | 0 | 0 | 21 | 4 | +17 | 9 | Group stage | — | — | 10–2 | — |
| 2 | Genappe | 3 | 2 | 0 | 0 | 1 | 10 | 10 | 0 | 6 | | 2–6 | — | — | 3–1 |
| 3 | Porto Mendo | 3 | 0 | 1 | 0 | 2 | 8 | 17 | −9 | 2 | | — | 3–5 | — | — |
| 4 | Toulon | 3 | 0 | 0 | 0 | 3 | 3 | 11 | −8 | 0 | | 0–5 | — | 2–3* | — |

Source: BSWW

=== Group G ===
| Pos | Team | Pld | W | W+ | WP | L | GF | GA | GD | Pts | Qualification | SAO | ACD | KEF | BVU |
|---|---|---|---|---|---|---|---|---|---|---|---|---|---|---|---|
| 1 | São Domingos | 3 | 3 | 0 | 0 | 0 | 10 | 5 | +5 | 9 | Group stage | — | — | 5–2 | — |
| 2 | ACD O Sótão B | 3 | 1 | 0 | 1 | 1 | 13 | 11 | +2 | 4 | | 1–2 | — | — | — |
| 3 | AO Kefallinia | 3 | 0 | 0 | 1 | 2 | 7 | 13 | −6 | 1 | | — | 3–6 | — | 2–2^{♦} |
| 4 | Benfica Viseu | 3 | 0 | 0 | 0 | 3 | 10 | 11 | −1 | 0 | | 2–3 | 6–6^{♦} | — | — |

Source: BSWW

== Group stage ==
Matches took place from 5 to 8 June.

The group winners, plus the six best runners-up (excluding the Challenge qualifiers groups), progress to the knockout stage. The statistically next best eight performing clubs recede to the 17th–24th place placement matches; the worst performing eight clubs recede to the 25th–32nd place placement matches.

=== Group A ===
| Pos | Team | Pld | W | W+ | WP | L | GF | GA | GD | Pts | Qualification | LEV | MAR | ACD | VAM |
|---|---|---|---|---|---|---|---|---|---|---|---|---|---|---|---|
| 1 | Levante | 3 | 3 | 0 | 0 | 0 | 20 | 11 | +9 | 9 | Round of 16 | — | 6–4 | — | 9–3 |
| 2 | Marseille BT | 3 | 1 | 1 | 0 | 1 | 14 | 10 | +4 | 5 | Round of 16 | — | — | — | 6–1 |
| 3 | ACD O Sótão (H) | 3 | 1 | 0 | 0 | 2 | 14 | 12 | +2 | 3 | 17th–24th place play-offs | 4–5 | 3–4* | — | — |
| 4 | BLC Vamos | 3 | 0 | 0 | 0 | 3 | 7 | 22 | −15 | 0 | 25th–32nd place play-offs | — | — | 3–7 | — |

Source: BSWW
(H) Host

=== Group B ===
| Pos | Team | Pld | W | W+ | WP | L | GF | GA | GD | Pts | Qualification | BRA | COP | BAG | ARM |
|---|---|---|---|---|---|---|---|---|---|---|---|---|---|---|---|
| 1 | Braga | 3 | 3 | 0 | 0 | 0 | 28 | 3 | +25 | 9 | Round of 16 | — | 6–2 | 19–1 | — |
| 2 | Copenhagen | 3 | 2 | 0 | 0 | 1 | 12 | 8 | +4 | 6 | Round of 16 | — | — | 7–2 | 3–0^{†} |
| 3 | Baggio | 3 | 1 | 0 | 0 | 2 | 6 | 26 | −20 | 3 | 25th–32nd place play-offs | — | — | — | 3–0^{†} |
| 4 | Arman Pablodar | 3 | 0 | 0 | 0 | 3 | 0 | 9 | −9 | 0 | Withdrew | 0–3^{†} | — | — | — |

Source: BSWW

=== Group C ===
| Pos | Team | Pld | W | W+ | WP | L | GF | GA | GD | Pts | Qualification | BLO | HUE | SPA | NIS |
|---|---|---|---|---|---|---|---|---|---|---|---|---|---|---|---|
| 1 | Benfica Loures | 3 | 2 | 0 | 0 | 1 | 17 | 9 | +8 | 6 | Round of 16 | — | — | 10–2 | 3–4 |
| 2 | Huelva | 3 | 1 | 0 | 1 | 1 | 9 | 9 | 0 | 4 | 17th–24th place play-offs | 3–4 | — | — | — |
| 3 | Spartak Varna | 3 | 1 | 0 | 0 | 2 | 9 | 15 | −6 | 3 | 17th–24th place play-offs | — | 2–2^{♦} | — | 5–3 |
| 4 | Nistru Chișinău | 3 | 1 | 0 | 0 | 2 | 10 | 12 | −2 | 3 | 25th–32nd place play-offs | — | 3–4 | — | — |

Source: BSWW

=== Group D ===
| Pos | Team | Pld | W | W+ | WP | L | GF | GA | GD | Pts | Qualification | HUS | SPO | BEM | MEL |
|---|---|---|---|---|---|---|---|---|---|---|---|---|---|---|---|
| 1 | Husty | 3 | 3 | 0 | 0 | 0 | 25 | 9 | +16 | 9 | Round of 16 | — | — | — | 12–2 |
| 2 | Sporting CP | 3 | 2 | 0 | 0 | 1 | 17 | 9 | +8 | 6 | Round of 16 | 3–5 | — | 6–1 | — |
| 3 | Bemannia Stockholm | 3 | 1 | 0 | 0 | 2 | 14 | 18 | −4 | 3 | 17th–24th place play-offs | 4–8 | — | — | — |
| 4 | Melistar | 3 | 0 | 0 | 0 | 3 | 9 | 29 | −20 | 0 | 25th–32nd place play-offs | — | 3–8 | 4–9 | — |

Source: BSWW

=== Group E ===
| Pos | Team | Pld | W | W+ | WP | L | GF | GA | GD | Pts | Qualification | KQA | WDA | BRD | SLA |
|---|---|---|---|---|---|---|---|---|---|---|---|---|---|---|---|
| 1 | Kfar Qassem | 3 | 3 | 0 | 0 | 0 | 20 | 5 | +15 | 9 | Round of 16 | — | 3–1 | — | 8–2 |
| 2 | West Deva | 3 | 2 | 0 | 0 | 1 | 12 | 7 | +5 | 6 | Round of 16 | — | — | — | 6–3 |
| 3 | Beach Royals Düsseldorf | 3 | 1 | 0 | 0 | 2 | 7 | 17 | −10 | 3 | 25th–32nd place play-offs | 2–9 | 1–5 | — | — |
| 4 | Slavia Prague | 3 | 0 | 0 | 0 | 3 | 8 | 18 | −10 | 0 | 25th–32nd place play-offs | — | — | 3–4 | — |

Source: BSWW

Details

| 5 June 2022 | Kfar Qassem (Israel) | 3–1 | (Romania) West Deva | Estádio do Viveiro |
| 09:45 | Ott 13', 22'; K. Ahmad 18' | Report | 5' Netinho | Referee: Sergio Soares (Portugal) |

| 5 June 2022 | Slavia Prague (Czech Republic) | 3–4 | (Germany) Beach Royals Düsseldorf | Estádio do Viveiro |
| 13:45 | | Report | | Referee: Wilson Soares (Portugal) |

| 7 June 2022 | Kfar Qassem (Israel) | 8–2 | (Czech Republic) Slavia Prague | Pitch 2 |
| 12:15 | Mauricinho 1'; Ott 5', 9', 17'; Moreb 10', 36'; S. Abed 21'; Jabareen 32' | Report | 13' Valeš; 19' Trampota | Referee: Sergio Soares (Portugal) |

| 7 June 2022 | Beach Royals Düsseldorf (Germany) | 1–5 | (Romania) West Deva | Estádio do Viveiro |
| 15:00 | Kinscher 2' | Report | 1', 15' F. Vale; 24', 34' Netinho; 28' Boata | Referee: Francisco Costa (Portugal) |

| 8 June 2022 | West Deva (Romania) | 6–3 | (Czech Republic) Slavia Prague | Pitch 2 |
| 13:45 | | Report | | Referee: Vladimir Tashkov (Bulgaria) |

| 8 June 2022 | Beach Royals Düsseldorf (Germany) | 2–9 | (Israel) Kfar Qassem | Estádio do Viveiro |
| 15:00 | Schulte 19'; Jason 23' | Report | 3', 8' Eliott; 4', 6' Jabareen; 13', 13' Ott; 17' (pen.) Yatim; 18' Mauricinho; 33' Moreb | Referee: Csaba Baghy (Hungary) |

=== Group F ===
| Pos | Team | Pld | W | W+ | WP | L | GF | GA | GD | Pts | Qualification | GMP | BGD | POR | DEM |
|---|---|---|---|---|---|---|---|---|---|---|---|---|---|---|---|
| 1 | Grande-Motte Pyramide | 3 | 3 | 0 | 0 | 0 | 13 | 4 | +9 | 9 | Round of 16 | — | — | 6–3 | 3–0^{†} |
| 2 | Boca Gdansk | 3 | 2 | 0 | 0 | 1 | 11 | 6 | +5 | 6 | Round of 16 | 1–4 | — | 7–2 | — |
| 3 | Portsmouth | 3 | 1 | 0 | 0 | 2 | 8 | 13 | −5 | 3 | 17th–24th place play-offs | — | — | — | 3–0^{†} |
| 4 | Dembava | 3 | 0 | 0 | 0 | 3 | 0 | 9 | −9 | 0 | Withdrew | — | 0–3^{†} | — | — |

Source: BSWW

=== Group G ===
| Pos | Team | Pld | W | W+ | WP | L | GF | GA | GD | Pts | Qualification | ALA | NEW | BAZ | NAX |
|---|---|---|---|---|---|---|---|---|---|---|---|---|---|---|---|
| 1 | Alanya Belediyespor | 3 | 3 | 0 | 0 | 0 | 26 | 10 | +16 | 9 | Round of 16 | — | 8–5 | — | 9–1 |
| 2 | Newteam Brussels | 3 | 2 | 0 | 0 | 1 | 17 | 12 | +5 | 6 | Round of 16 | — | — | 4–3 | 8–1 |
| 3 | Bavaria Bazis | 3 | 1 | 0 | 0 | 2 | 10 | 14 | −4 | 3 | 17th–24th place play-offs | 4–9 | — | — | — |
| 4 | Naxos | 3 | 0 | 0 | 0 | 3 | 3 | 20 | −17 | 0 | 25th–32nd place play-offs | — | — | 1–3 | — |

Source: BSWW

=== Group H ===
| Pos | Team | Pld | W | W+ | WP | L | GF | GA | GD | Pts | Qualification | PIS | AUG | ATL | ROS |
|---|---|---|---|---|---|---|---|---|---|---|---|---|---|---|---|
| 1 | Pisa 2014 | 3 | 3 | 0 | 0 | 0 | 22 | 11 | +11 | 9 | Round of 16 | — | — | 7–0 | 8–7 |
| 2 | Augur Enemat | 3 | 1 | 0 | 0 | 2 | 12 | 16 | −4 | 3 | 17th–24th place play-offs | 4–7 | — | — | — |
| 3 | Atlas AO | 3 | 1 | 0 | 0 | 2 | 12 | 18 | −6 | 3 | 17th–24th place play-offs | — | 4–5 | — | — |
| 4 | Rostocker Robben | 3 | 0 | 1 | 0 | 2 | 18 | 19 | −1 | 2 | 25th–32nd place play-offs | — | 5–3* | 6–8 | — |

Source: BSWW

=== Group I (Challenge qualifiers, Group 1) ===
| Pos | Team | Pld | W | W+ | WP | L | GF | GA | GD | Pts | Qualification | NAP | VAR | SES | GRP |
|---|---|---|---|---|---|---|---|---|---|---|---|---|---|---|---|
| 1 | Napoli Patron | 3 | 3 | 0 | 0 | 0 | 10 | 3 | +7 | 9 | Round of 16 / Challenge Final | — | — | 5–1 | 4–2 |
| 2 | Varzim | 3 | 1 | 0 | 1 | 1 | 10 | 6 | +4 | 4 | | 0–1 | — | — | 2–2^{♦} |
| 3 | Sesimbra | 3 | 1 | 0 | 0 | 2 | 7 | 15 | −8 | 3 | | — | 3–8 | — | — |
| 4 | GRAP | 3 | 0 | 0 | 0 | 3 | 6 | 9 | −3 | 0 | | — | — | 2–3 | — |

Source: BSWW

=== Group J (Challenge qualifiers, Group 2) ===
| Pos | Team | Pld | W | W+ | WP | L | GF | GA | GD | Pts | Qualification | RHA | MUN | SAO | BUA |
|---|---|---|---|---|---|---|---|---|---|---|---|---|---|---|---|
| 1 | Rosh HaAyin | 3 | 3 | 0 | 0 | 0 | 14 | 9 | +5 | 9 | Round of 16 / Challenge Final | — | — | 5–2 | 2–1 |
| 2 | Real Münster | 3 | 2 | 0 | 0 | 1 | 19 | 14 | +5 | 6 | | 6–7 | — | 6–4 | — |
| 3 | São Domingos | 3 | 1 | 0 | 0 | 2 | 10 | 13 | −3 | 3 | | — | — | — | 4–2 |
| 4 | Buarcos 2017 | 3 | 0 | 0 | 0 | 3 | 6 | 13 | −7 | 0 | | — | 3–7 | — | — |

Source: BSWW

== Placement matches ==
Key

- w/o – Walkover (awarded as 3–0)
- np – not played

=== 25th–32nd place ===
29th place match
10 June; Report
Slavia Prague (et) | 5
BLC Vamos | 4
31st place match
Melistar | np
Naxos

29th–32nd semi-finals
Melistar
Slavia Prague | w/o
BLC Vamos | w/o
Naxos

25th–32nd quarter-finals
9 June; Report
BR Düsseldorf | w/o
Melistar
9 June; Report
Rostocker Robben | 6
Slavia Prague | 2
9 June; Report
Nistru Chișinău | 8
BLC Vamos | 4
9 June; Report
Baggio | w/o
Naxos

25th–28th semi-finals
10 June; Report
BR Düsseldorf | 8
Rostocker Robben | 3
10 June; Report
Nistru Chișinău | w/o
Baggio

25th place match
11 June; Report
BR Düsseldorf | 1
Nistru Chișinău | 2
27th place match
11 June; Report
Rostocker Robben | w/o
Baggio

=== 17th–24th place ===
21st place match
11 June; Report
Bavaria Bazis | 1
Huelva | 6
23rd place match
11 June; Report
Portsmouth | 5
Bemannia Stockholm | 4

21st–24th semi-finals
10 June; Report
Portsmouth | 3
Bavaria Bazis | 5
10 June; Report
Huelva | 5
Bemannia Stockholm | 2

17th–24th quarter-finals
9 June; Report
Augur Enemat | 9
Portsmouth | 1
9 June; Report
Spartak Varna | 6
Bavaria Bazis | 3
9 June; Report
Huelva | 5
Atlas AO | 6
9 June; Report
ACD O Sótão | 9
Bemannia Stockholm | 1

17th–20th semi-finals
10 June; Report
Augur Enemat (et) | 5
Spartak Varna | 4
10 June; Report
Atlas AO | 4
ACD O Sótão | 8

17th place match
11 June; Report
Augur Enemat | 1
ACD O Sótão | 2
19th place match
11 June; Report
Spartak Varna | 5
Atlas AO | 3

== Knockout stage ==
The draw for the round of 16, and allocation of ties to the bracket, took place after the conclusion of all group stage matches on 8 June.

EW Challenge final

9th place match
12 June
Boca Gdansk | 4
Pisa 2014 | 3
11th place match
12 June
Husty
Sporting CP | w/o
13th place match
12 June
Marseille BT | 5
Newteam Brussels | 1
15th place match
12 June
West Deva
Napoli Patron | w/o

9th–12th semi-finals
11 June
Husty
Boca Gdansk | w/o
11 June
Pisa 2014 (p) | 1(5)
Sporting CP | 1(4)
13th–16th semi-finals
11 June
Marseille BT | 6
West Deva | 3
11 June
Newteam Brussels | 4
Napoli Patron | 3

9th–16th quarter-finals
10 June
Husty | 4
Marseille BT | 2
10 June
West Deva | 4
Boca Gdansk | 5
10 June
Pisa 2014 | 7
Newteam Brussels | 6
10 June
Sporting CP (p) | 4(4)
Napoli Patron | 4(2)

Round of 16
9 June
Husty | 1
Copenhagen | 6
9 June
GM Pyramide | 7
Marseille BT | 4
9 June
A. Belediyespor | 5
West Deva | 3
9 June
Braga | 5
Boca Gdansk | 2
9 June
Pisa 2014 | 1
Benfica Loures | 3
9 June
Levante | 7
Newteam Brussels | 5
9 June
Kfar Qassem | 5
Sporting CP | 3
9 June
Rosh HaAyin (p) | 1(7)
Napoli Patron | 1(6)

Quarterfinals
10 June
Copenhagen | 1
GM Pyramide | 2
10 June
A. Belediyespor | 0
Braga | 8
10 June
Benfica Loures (et) | 3
Levante | 2
10 June
Kfar Qassem | 4
Rosh HaAyin | 3

Semi-finals
11 June
GM Pyramide | 2
Braga | 7
11 June
Benfica Loures | 5
Kfar Qassem | 3
5th–8th semi-finals
11 June
Copenhagen | 6
A. Belediyespor | 1
11 June
Levante | 4
Rosh HaAyin | 8

Final
12 June
Braga | 1
Benfica Loures | 3
3rd place match
12 June
GM Pyramide | 2
Kfar Qassem | 7
5th place match
12 June
Copenhagen | 1
Rosh HaAyin | 4
7th place match
12 June
A. Belediyespor | 6
Levante | 2

=== Round of 16 ===
9 June 2022
08:30

| Husty | 1–6 | Copenhagen |
|---|---|---|
| Filipov 1' | Report | 4', 20', 34' Wegeberg; 15' Lyng; 27', 33' Damm |

Estádio do Viveiro
Referee: Francisco Costa (Portugal)
9 June 2022
09:45

| Grande-Motte Pyramide | 7–4 | Marseille BT |
|---|---|---|
| Huck 1'; Kuman 5', 32'; Drouillet 6'; Alex 11'; Tiffano 14'; Barbotti 32' | Report | 12' Nelson; 22' Carpita; 32' Bru; 33' Santos Dias |

Estádio do Viveiro
Referee: Sergio Gomes (Portugal)
9 June 2022
11:00

| Alanya Belediyespor | 5–3 | West Deva |
|---|---|---|
| Adil 13'; Stankovic 24', 36'; Keskin 33', 35' | Report | 10' Netinho; 21' Toni; 31' Bolat |

Estádio do Viveiro
Referee: Csaba Baghy (Hungary)
9 June 2022
12:15

| Levante | 7–5 | Newteam Brussels |
|---|---|---|
| Andrei Paul 4'; Hodel 4', 20'; Batis 11', 24'; F. Mejías 19' (o.g.); Suárez 22' | Report | 10' Pinto; 12' Ennya; 19' F. Mejías; 20' Groyne; 21' Domi |

Estádio do Viveiro
Referee: Saverio Bottalico (Italy)
9 June 2022
13:45

| Kfar Qassem | 5–3 | Sporting CP |
|---|---|---|
| Ott 14'; Eliott 24'; Ozu 25'; Mauricinho 30', 34' | Report | 12' Dias; 20' Rui Coimbra; 29' Petrony |

Estádio do Viveiro
Referee: Francisco Bumedien (Spain)
9 June 2022
15:00

| Pisa 2014 | 1–3 | Benfica Loures |
|---|---|---|
| Josep Jr. 35' | Report | 16' Chiky; 25' L. Henrique; 33' B. Lopes |

Estádio do Viveiro
Referee: Laurynas Arzuolaitis (Lithuania)
9 June 2022
16:15

| Braga | 5–2 | Boca Gdansk |
|---|---|---|
| Filipe 4', 33'; Léo Martins 16', 28', 29' | Report | 6' Pietrasiak; 16' Antonio |

Estádio do Viveiro
Referee: Vladimir Tashkov (Bulgaria)
Euro Winners Challenge final
9 June 2022
19:00

| Rosh HaAyin | 1–1 (a.e.t.) | Napoli Patron |
|---|---|---|
| Zé Lucas 4' | Report | 20' Jose |
Penalties
| | 7–6 |

Estádio do Viveiro
Referee: Malte Gerhardt (Germany)

=== Quarter-finals ===
==== 9th–16th place ====
10 June 2022
12:15

| Husty | 4–2 | Marseille BT |
|---|---|---|
| Šmálik 15'; Filipov 16', 31'; Sivoň 36' | Report | 9' Soilhi; 36' Thioune |

Pitch 2
Referee: Malte Gerhardt (Germany)
10 June 2022
13:45

| Pisa 2014 | 7–6 | Newteam Brussels |
|---|---|---|
| Di Palma 4', 16'; Jordan O. 7'; Di Tullio 8'; Ortolini 23', 34'; Bruno Xavier 27' | Report | 2' Ben Azouz; 6', 22' F. Mejías; 15', 24' Domi; 21' Groyne |

Pitch 2
Referee: Dario Minder (Switzerland)
10 June 2022
15:00

| West Deva | 4–5 | Boca Gdansk |
|---|---|---|
| Netinho 2'; Toni 6'; Ravi 9'; Boata 15' | Report | 1', 23' Alejandro; 6' Meloyan; 24' Pietrasiak; 34' Klawikowski |

Pitch 2
Referee: Vasileios Fitsas (Greece)
10 June 2022
19:00

| Sporting CP | 4–4 (a.e.t.) | Napoli Patron |
|---|---|---|
| Von 1'; Rui Coimbra 3'; Pinhal 20'; Ricardinho 33' | Report | 12' Georgikopoulos; 28' Skourtas; 30' Jose; 31' Waleed B. |
Penalties
| | 4–2 |

Pitch 2
Referee: Moreno Longo (Italy)

==== 1st–8th place ====
10 June 2022
11:00

| Copenhagen | 1–2 | Grande-Motte Pyramide |
|---|---|---|
| Damm 31' | Report | 2' Huck; 29' Kuman |

Estádio do Viveiro
Referee: Eduards Borisevičs (Latvia)
10 June 2022
13:45

| Benfica Loures | 3–2 (a.e.t.) | Levante |
|---|---|---|
| Andre P. 32'; Batalha 37'; Chiky 39' | Report | 29' Hodel; 38' Pedro |

Estádio do Viveiro
Referee: Vladimir Tashkov (Bulgaria)
10 June 2022
17:45

| Kfar Qassem (Israel) | 4–3 | Rosh HaAyin |
|---|---|---|
| Ott 16' (pen.), 36'; Moad 19'; Moreb 29' | Report | 4' Zé Lucas; 10' Catarino; 33' Elihay |

Estádio do Viveiro
Referee: Sergio Gomes (Portugal)
10 June 2022
19:00

| Alanya Belediyespor | 0–8 | Braga |
|---|---|---|
| | Report | 6', 6', 30', 35' Filipe; 7', 26', 32' Léo Martins; 16' Thanger |

Estádio do Viveiro
Referee: Saverio Bottalico (Italy)

=== Semi-finals ===
==== 13th–16th place ====
11 June 2022
09:45

| Marseille BT | 6–3 | West Deva |
|---|---|---|
| F. Vale 14' (o.g.); Santos Dias 18'; Nelson 20', 34'; Soilhi 27'; Gharbi 31' | Report | 17' Netinho; 21' Fabricio; 22' Boata |

Pitch 3
Referee: Malte Gerhardt (Germany)
11 June 2022
15:00

| Newteam Brussels | 4–3 | Napoli Patron |
|---|---|---|
| Groyne 8'; Ennya 21'; Sarkic 31'; Aymeric 35' | Report | 32', 34' Waleed B.; 35' Alfredo |

Pitch 2
Referee: Alvaro Canovas (Spain)

==== 9th–12th place ====
11 June 2022
16:15

| Pisa 2014 | 1–1 (a.e.t.) | Sporting CP |
|---|---|---|
| Camillo 32' | Report | 27' Belchior |
Penalties
| | 5–4 |

Pitch 2
Referee: Laurynas Arzuolaitis (Lithuania)
11 June 2022
19:00

| Husty | 0–3 w/o | Boca Gdansk |
|---|---|---|
| | Report |

Pitch 2
Referee: Sergio Santos (Portugal)

==== 5th–8th place ====
11 June 2022
12:15

| Levante | 4–8 | Rosh HaAyin |
|---|---|---|
| Antonio 14'; Adri Frutos 17', 18'; Suárez 28' | Report | 6' (o.g.) I. Borsuk; 16' Catarino; 17', 26' Elihay; 25' Bobo; 30', 33' Zé Lucas; 35' Daninho |

Estádio do Viveiro
Referee: Moreno Longo (Italy)
11 June 2022
13:45

| Copenhagen | 6–1 | Alanya Belediyespor |
|---|---|---|
| Frandsen 1', 34'; Damm 25', 28'; Wegeberg 27'; Dorph 36' | Report | 30' Stankovic |

Estádio do Viveiro
Referee: Susanna Fiammetta (Italy)

==== 1st–4th place ====
11 June 2022
17:45

| Benfica Loures | 5–3 | (Israel) Kfar Qassem |
|---|---|---|
| Chiky 6'; L. Henrique 11', 27'; Paulinho 11'; Seixas 19' | Report | 6', 11', 19' S. Moreb |

Estádio do Viveiro
Referee: Saverio Bottalico (Italy)
11 June 2022
19:00

| Grande-Motte Pyramide | 2–7 | Braga |
|---|---|---|
| Kuman 19'; Tiffano 28' | Report | 4' Datinha; 6' Bê Martins; 8', 19' Filipe; 14' Lourenço; 18' (o.g.) Drouillet; 33' Léo Martins |

Estádio do Viveiro
Referee: Csaba Baghy (Hungary)

=== Finals ===
==== 15th place match ====
12 June 2022
15:00

| West Deva | 0–3 w/o | Napoli Patron |
|---|---|---|
| | Report |

Pitch 2
Referee: Csaba Baghy (Hungary)

==== 13th place match ====
12 June 2022
09:45

| Marseille BT | 5–1 | Newteam Brussels |
|---|---|---|
| Bru 20', 25', 36'; Santos Dias 28', 35' | Report | 12' Sarkic |

Pitch 2
Referee: Francisco Costa (Portugal)

==== 11th place match ====
12 June 2022
13:45

| Husty | 0–3 w/o | Sporting CP |
|---|---|---|
| | Report |

Pitch 2
Referee: Annett Unterbeck (Germany)

==== 9th place match ====
12 June 2022
09:45

| Pisa 2014 | 3–4 | Boca Gdansk |
|---|---|---|
| Vaglini 5'; Camillo 6'; Josep Jr. 34' | Report | 10', 36' Alejandro; 30', 31' Pietrasiak |

Estádio do Viveiro
Referee: Vladimir Tashkov (Bulgaria)

==== 7th place match ====
12 June 2022
12:15

| Levante | 2–6 | Alanya Belediyespor |
|---|---|---|
| Pedro 3'; Batis 24' | Report | 11', 21', 30' Stankovic; 27', 29' Lorenzo; 28' Adil |

Estádio do Viveiro
Referee: Dario Minder (Switzerland)

==== 5th place match ====
12 June 2022
13:45

| Copenhagen | 1–4 | Rosh HaAyin |
|---|---|---|
| Damm 9' | Report | 11' Zé Lucas; 18' Catarino; 33' Ofek; 33' Elihay |

Estádio do Viveiro
Referee: Moreno Longo (Italy)

==== 3rd place match ====
12 June 2022
16:15

| Grande-Motte Pyramide | 2–7 | (Israel) Kfar Qassem |
|---|---|---|
| Tiffano 26'; Droulliet 27' | Report | 10', 14', 19', 27' Ott; 12' Ozu; 28' A. Yatim; 36' S. Moreb |

Estádio do Viveiro
Referee: Malte Gerhardt (Germany)

==== Final ====
12 June 2022
19:00

| Braga | 1–3 | Benfica Loures |
|---|---|---|
| Léo Martins 10' | Report | 7' Paulinho; 26' Batalha; 32' Miguel P. |

Estádio do Viveiro
Referee: Laurynas Arzuolaitis (Lithuania)

== Awards ==
The following individual awards were presented after the final.

Top scorer(s)
(Bulgaria) Filip Filipov ( (Slovakia) Husty)
17 goals
Best player
(Brazil) Luis Henrique ( Benfica Loures)
Best goalkeeper
(Portugal) Elinton Andrade ( Benfica Loures)

== Top goalscorers ==
Players with at least five goals are listed; teams/players involved in the Euro Winners Challenge are not included.

17 goals

- (Bulgaria) Filip Filipov ( (Slovakia) Husty)

14 goals

- (Switzerland) Noël Ott ( (Israel) Kfar Qassem)

13 goals

- (Switzerland) Dejan Stankovic ( (Turkey) Alanya Belediyespor)

12 goals

- (Brazil) Filipe Silva ( (Portugal) Braga)

10 goals

- (Spain) Eduard Suárez ( (Spain) Levante)
- (Denmark) Axel Damm ( (Denmark) Copenhagen)
- (Portugal) Léo Martins ( (Portugal) Braga)

8 goals

- (Brazil) Jordan Oliveira ( (Italy) Pisa 2014)
- (Mozambique) Nelson Manuel ( (France) Marseille BT)
- (Brazil) Bokinha ( (Bulgaria) Spartak Varna)
- (Brazil) Netinho ( (Romania) West Deva)
- (Portugal) Duarte Vivo ( (Portugal) ACD O Sótão)
- (Germany) Sven Körner ( (Germany) Rostocker Robben)
- (Israel) Sameh Moreb ( (Israel) Kfar Qassem)

7 goals

- (Czech Republic) Daniel Valeš ( (Czech Republic) Slavia Prague)
- (Moldova) Nicolae Ignat ( (Moldova) Nistru Chișinău)
- (Spain) Pablo Perez ( (Spain) Huelva)
- (Romania) Marian Măciucă ( (Bulgaria) Spartak Varna)
- (France) Jérémy Bru ( (France) Marseille BT)
- (Spain) Fran Mejías ( (Belgium) Newteam Brussels)
- (Brazil) Benjamin Jr. ( (Portugal) ACD O Sótão)
- (Brazil) Eudin ( (Turkey) Alanya Belediyespor)

6 goals

- (Italy) Michele Di Palma ( (Italy) Pisa 2014)
- (Spain) Kuman ( (France) Grande-Motte Pyramide)
- (Belgium) Sebastien Groyne ( (Belgium) Newteam Brussels)
- (Germany) Tim Kautermann ( (Germany) Rostocker Robben)
- (Poland) Patryk Pietrasiak ( (Poland) Boca Gdansk)
- (Turkey) Cem Keskin ( (Turkey) Alanya Belediyespor)

5 goals

- (Slovakia) Pavol Hrnčiar ( (Slovakia) Husty)
- (Czech Republic) Lukáš Trampota ( (Czech Republic) Slavia Prague)
- (Italy) Josep Jr. ( (Italy) Pisa 2014)
- (Spain) Francisco Casano ( (Spain) Huelva)
- (Sweden) William Garcia ( (Sweden) Bemannia Stockholm)
- (Greece) Konstantinos Tsitsaris ( (Greece) Atlas AO)
- (Spain) Cristian Torres ( (Greece) Atlas AO)
- (Portugal) Duarte Algarvio ( (Portugal) Benfica Loures)
- (Portugal) André Pinto ( (Portugal) Benfica Loures)
- (Spain) Chiky Ardil ( (Portugal) Benfica Loures)
- (Portugal) Alexandre Lança ( (Portugal) ACD O Sótão)
- (Denmark) Lukas Frandsen ( (Denmark) Copenhagen)
- (Brazil) Alejandro Sydney ( (Poland) Boca Gdansk)
- (Germany) Christoph Thürk ( (Germany) Rostocker Robben)
- (Portugal) Joao Mota ( (Portugal) Sporting CP)
- (Portugal) Rui Coimbra ( (Portugal) Sporting CP)
- (Switzerland) Glenn Hodel ( (Spain) Levante)
- (Spain) Soleiman Batis ( (Spain) Levante)

Source: BSWW

== Final standings ==
| Rank | Team | Result |
|---|---|---|
| 1 | Benfica Loures | Champions (1st title) |
| 2 | Braga | Runners-up |
| 3 | Kfar Qassem | Third place |
| 4 | Grande-Motte Pyramide | |
| 5 | Rosh HaAyin | |
| 6 | Copenhagen | |
| 7 | Alanya Belediyespor | |
| 8 | Levante | |
| 9 | Boca Gdansk | |
| 10 | Pisa 2014 | |
| 11 | Sporting CP | |
| 12 | Husty | |
| 13 | Marseille BT | |
| 14 | Newteam Brussels | |
| 15 | Napoli Patron | |
| 16 | West Deva | |
| 17 | ACD O Sótão | |
| 18 | Augur Enemat | |
| 19 | Spartak Varna | |
| 20 | Atlas AO | |
| 21 | Huelva | |
| 22 | Bavaria Bazis | |
| 23 | Portsmouth | |
| 24 | Bemannia Stockholm | |
| 25 | Nistru Chișinău | |
| 26 | Beach Royals Düsseldorf | |
| 27 | Rostocker Robben | |
| 28 | Baggio | |
| 29 | Slavia Prague | |
| 30 | BLC Vamos | |
| 31 | Melistar | |
| 31 | Naxos | |

== See also ==
- 2022 Women's Euro Winners Cup
