= 2025 Euro Winners Challenge =

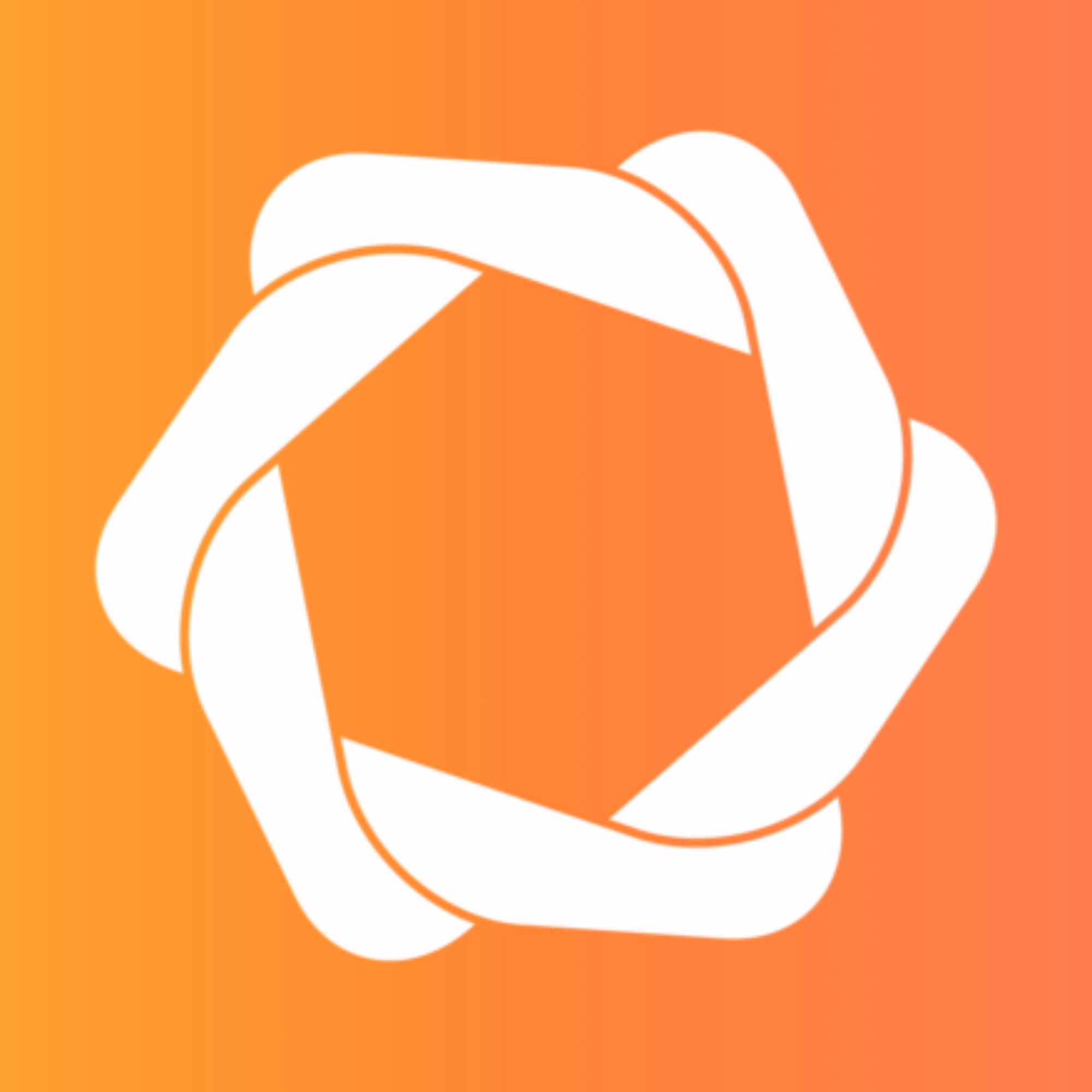

Tournament details
- Cities: Nazaré, Portugal, Portugal
- Dates: June 6, 2025– June 12, 2025
- Teams: 20

Final positions
- Champions: (Portugal) GD Alfarim (1st title)
- Runners-up: (Germany) Real Münster
- Third place: (Spain) Vila Flor SC
- Fourth place: (France) Cevennes

Tournament statistics
- Matches played: 44
- Goals scored: 346 (7.86 per match)
- Top scorer(s): (Portugal) Léo Martins; 14 goals (Real Münster)
- Best player: (Portugal) João Cabral (Alfarim)
- Best goalkeeper: (Portugal) João Oliveira (Alfarim)

The 2025 Euro Winners Challenge was the sixth edition of the Euro Winners Challenge (ECC), the of Europe's secondary club beach soccer organized by Beach Soccer Worldwide and open to any team that didn't qualify to the main continental competition. The tournament was held from 6th to 12th June in Nazaré in Portugal along-side the 2025 Euro Winners Cup. For the second consecutive year, a Portuguese club, GD Alfarim, won the title and qualify - with the losing finalist - to the following EWC.

== Group stage ==
20 clubs from 9 different countries played in group-stage phase, with the 5 winners and the best runner-up qualify to the Quarter-finals with the other 4 runner-ups that compete in a Placement Match to get the last two spots available to Playoffs.

=== Group A ===
Pos	Team	Points	GD	Qualification
1	(Greece) AO Kefallinia	6	+6	Quarter-finals
2	(Portugal) AD Nazaré	6	+4	Placement Match
3	(Portugal) AD Pasteis	6	-1	Eliminated
4	(Belarus) Brest-Volga	0	-9	Eliminated

=== Group B ===
Pos	Team	Points	GD	Qualification
1	(France) Cevennes	6	+6	Quarter-finals
2	(Portugal) Vila Flor SC	6	+4	Placement match
3	(Portugal) Ericerense	5	+4	Eliminated
4	(Belgium) FC Genappe	0	-8	Eliminated

=== Group C ===
Pos	Team	Points	GD	Qualification
1	(Spain) Torrejon	6	+4	Quarter-finals
2	(Italy) Naxos BS	6	+4	Quarter-finals
3	(Belgium) Perwez Vamos	4	-4	Eliminated
4	(Portugal) ACD O Sótão - B	0	-4	Eliminated

=== Group D ===
Pos	Team	Points	GD	Qualification
1	(Germany) Real Münster	9	+22	Quarter-finals
2	(Portugal) Porto Mendo	6	+1	Placement match
3	(Portugal) CR dos Pinheiros	3	-14	Eliminated
4	(Georgia (country)) TBSC Armia	0	-9	Eliminated

=== Group E ===
Pos	Team	Points	GD	Qualification
1	(Portugal) GD Alfarim	7	+10	Quarter-finals
2	(France) Mouilleron SF	6	+3	Placement match
3	(Spain) Fran Meijas	3	-1	Eliminated
4	(Portugal) CB Viseu	0	-12	Eliminated

== Brackets ==
=== Placement Matches ===
- 7th vs 10th place match: Villa Flor SC vs Porto Mendo: 7–2
- 8th vs 9th place match: AD Nazaré vs Mouilleron SF: 4–5

=== Playoff Matches ===
Quarter-finals
(France) Cevennes	7
(Italy) Naxos BS	6
(Portugal) GD Alfarim	4
(Spain) Torrejon	2
(Greece) AO Kefallinia	3
(Spain) Villa Flor SC	6
(Germany) Real Münster	14
(France) Mouilleron SF	5

Semi-finals
(Portugal) GD Alfarim	4 (4)
(France) Cevennes	3 (3)
(Germany) Real Münster	6
(Spain) Villa Flor SC	2

Final
(Portugal) GD Alfarim	4
(Germany) Real Münster	3
Third place
(France) Cevennes	3
(Spain) Villa Flor SC	4

Consolation tournament

5th/8th place Playoff
(France) Mouilleron SF	3
(Greece) AO Kefallinia (aet)	4
(Spain) Torrejón	5
(Italy) Naxos BS	3

5th/6th place final
(Spain) Torrejón	5
(Greece) AO Kefallinia	2
7th/8th place Final
(Italy) Naxos BS	3
(France) Mouilleron SF	0

== 2025 Euro Winners Challenge final ==
=== GD Alfarim vs Real Münster ===
12th June 2025
19:15 CEST

(Portugal) GD Alfarim	4-3 aet	(Germany) Real Münster
Rodrigo Pinhal 14', 25'; André Pinto 30'; Cabral (e.a.t.)	Report	Jordan 4'; Léo Martins 11', 12'

Final Stadium, Nazaré, Portugal, Portugal
Attendance: ???
Referee: Moreno Francesco Longo (Italy)

GD de Alfarim	Real Münster e. V

== Awards and statistics ==
=== Individual Awards ===
Best Player
(Portugal) João Cabral (GD Alfarim)
Top scorer

(Portugal) Léo Martins (Real Münster)
14 goals in 6 games

Best Goalkeeper
(Portugal) João Oliveira (GD Alfarim)

=== Topscorers ===
Rank	Player	Club	Goals
1	Léo Martins	Real Münster	14
2	Jordan Santos	Real Münster	13
3	Perez; Billet	Naxos BS; Mouilleron SF	12
5	Andre	GD Alfarim	10

=== Final standings ===
Pos	Team	Result
1	(Portugal) GD Alfarim	2025 Euro Winners Challenge and 2026 Euro Winners Cup
2	(Germany) Real Münster	2026 Euro Winners Cup
3	(Spain) Vila Flor SC	Third place
4	(France) Cevennes	
5	(Spain) Torrejón	
6	(Greece) AO Kefallinia	
7	(Italy) Naxos BS	
8	(France) Mouilleron SF	
9	(Portugal) AD Nazaré	
10	(Portugal) Porto Mendo	

== See also ==
- 2025 Euro Winners Cup
- World Winners Cup
- Euro Winners Challenge
