= MFC Spartak Varna =

Spartak Varna
- Full name: MFC Spartak Varna
- Founded: 2008
- Head Coach: Simeon Hristov
- League: Bulgarian Championship
- 2021: Bulgarian Championship, 1st
- Website: http://www.mfcspartak.com/
Home colours
Away colours

MFC Spartak Varna (Bulgarian: МФК Спартак Варна) is a Bulgarian beach soccer team based in Varna. The club was founded in 2008. Spartak have won a 10 Bulgarian Championship titles.

== Honours ==
Bulgarian Championship

- Winners (10): 2008, 2011, 2012, 2013, 2016, 2017, 2018, 2019, 2020, 2021
- Runners-up (4): 2009, 2010, 2014, 2015

Varna International Beach Soccer Cup

- Winners: 2022, 2021, 2017
- Runners-up: 2024, 2023, 2019
- 3rd place: 2018

Beach Soccer International Cup West Dewa

- Runners-up: 2017

Euro Winners Cup

- Group stage: 2014
- Group stage: 2017
- 12th place: 2018
- Round of 32: 2019
- 8th place: 2021
- 19th place: 2022
- Round of 16: 2023
- 11th place: 2024

== Current squad ==
As of 2024 Euro Winners Cup

Note: Flags indicate national team as defined under FIFA eligibility rules; some limited exceptions apply. Players may hold more than one non-FIFA nationality.

No.	Pos.	Nation	Player
6	MF	BUL	Stanislav Dzhambazov
7	FW	BUL	Pavel Adamov
8	MF	BUL	Kaloyan Tsvetkov (captain)
9	FW	BRA	Igor Rangel
10	MF	BUL	Georgi Dimitrov
11	DF	BUL	Iliyan Iliev

No.	Pos.	Nation	Player
12	GK	BUL	Dobromir Gospodinov
13	GK	POR	Francisco Ferreira
17	DF	BRA	Balinha
21	MF	BUL	Simeon Hristov
22	FW	BUL	Ivan Martinov
23	FW	BRA	Ryan Yano
