= G.D. Sesimbra =

Portuguese sports club

GD Sesimbra
- Full name: Grupo Desportivo de Sesimbra
- Nicknames: Sesimbrenses; Pexitos
- Founded: 10 August 1947; 79 years ago
- Ground: Estádio Vila Amália, Sesimbra
- Capacity: 2,850
- Chairman: Pedro Macedo
- Website: http://www.gdsesimbra.pt/
Home colours	Away colours

Grupo Desportivo de Sesimbra (GDS) is a Portuguese multi-sport club based in the costal town of Sesimbra, located in the Setúbal District. The club was founded on 10 August 1947 as a result of a merger between the three football teams that then existed in Sesimbra: União Futebol Sesimbra, Vitória Futebol Club, and Ases Futebol Clube. The merger was intended to enable the town of Sesimbra to achieve greater prominence in Portuguese sport.

Its main sports are football and rink hockey. In addition, the club also offers beach soccer, volleyball, swimming, gymnastics, and badminton.

The club’s greatest achievement is the WSE Cup (then called the CERS Cup) won in 1981 by the rink hockey team. In football, the club competed for several seasons in the Portuguese Second Division, reaching its peak in the 1969–70 season, when it finished in second place, just one point short of promotion to the First Division. In football, its most recent title came in the 2023–24 season, when it won the Setúbal Football Association Second Division Championship.

The club’s colors are pink (cerise) and white.

Prior to his management career, José Mourinho once played for this team.

== History ==
The club was founded in 1947, when the three local clubs, União Futebol Sesimbra, Vitória Futebol Club and Ases Futebol Clube, decided to merge in order to become more competitive. The club has since played a significant role in the local sports scene. Over the years, G.D. Sesimbra has established itself as a key player in promoting sports and fostering a sense of community in the town.

== Crest and colours ==
The crest consists of a white rounded triangular shield, which at the top, presents in yellow a castle with four towers. Underneath, appears a blue band with the town name displayed in yellow. In the center of the shield appears a pink Santiago cross, just like as in Sesimbra's municipality coat of arms.

The main color of the kits varies between different shades of pink and cerise, with the secondary color being white.

== Notable players ==
- (Portugal) Rui Águas (1980–1982)
- (Portugal) José Mourinho (1983–1985)
