= Mauricinho (beach soccer) =

Brazilian beach soccer player

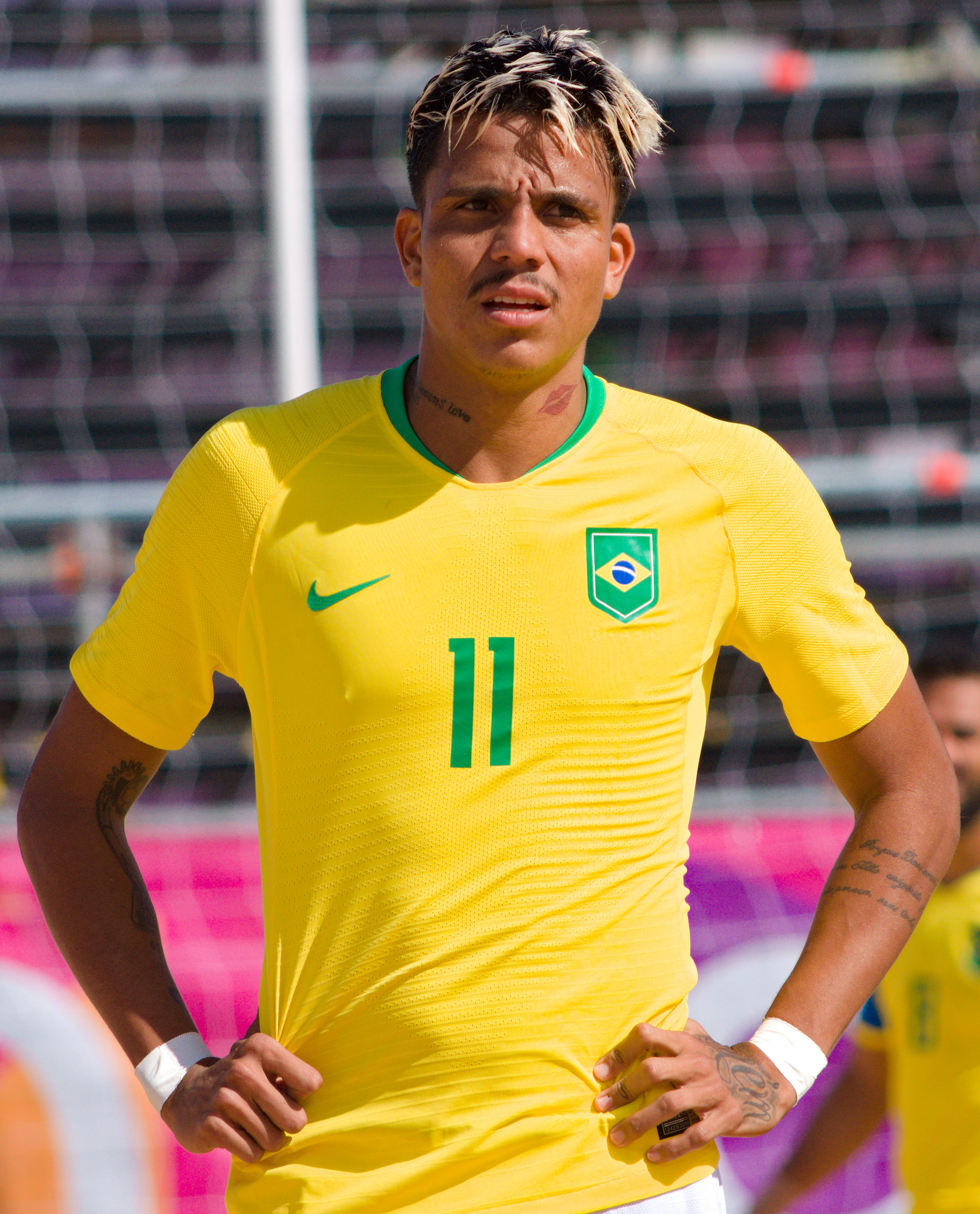
- Mauricinho at the 2019 South American Beach Games.

Personal information
- Full name: Mauricio Pereira Braz de Oliveira
- Date of birth: 9 December 1989 (age 36)
- Place of birth: Rio de Janeiro, Brazil
- Height: 1.85 m (6 ft 1 in)
- Position: Forward

Senior career*
Years	Team	Apps	(Gls)
2010–	Vasco da Gama		
2012	Internazionale		
2012	Al-Ahli		
2013–2014	Rotor-Volgograd		
2015–2016	Zolotoy		
2015	Flamengo		
2016	Gyöngyös		
2017	Braga		
2017	Lokomotiv Moscow		
2018	Catania		
2018–	Kristall		
2020	Tokyo Verdy		
2021	Bodon		
2022	Kfar Qassem		
2023	Dalian		
2025	Catania		
2025	Sportivo Luqueño		
2026	Kfar Qassem		

International career^{‡}
2012–	Brazil	167	(180)
- * Club domestic league appearances and goals ‡ National team caps and goals as of 19 August 2025

Mauricio Pereira Braz de Oliveira (born 9 December 1989), known better as Mauricinho, is a Brazilian beach soccer player who plays as a forward. He won the 2017 FIFA Beach Soccer World Cup representing Brazil and claimed the Silver Ball (second best player) award at the competition; he has also appeared at three other World Cups (2015, 2019, 2021). In addition, he was named the best player in the world at the 2017 Beach Soccer Stars awards.

== Career ==
Mauricinho began playing beach soccer competitively in 2010; he was spotted by Brazilian beach soccer legend, Júnior Negão, playing with friends on Copacabana Beach and was subsequently invited to play for Vasco da Gama.

He was first called up to the Brazilian national team in 2012. Mauricinho began to thrive under the leadership of coach Gilberto Costa, post-2015. This rise peaked in 2017 when he was voted by fellow players and coaches as the best player in the world; this followed being declared the second best player of that year's World Cup in the Bahamas in which he scored a brace in Brazil's win in the final over Tahiti. He was also the top scorer in Beach Soccer Worldwide competitions that year, with 54 goals.

He made his 100th appearance for Brazil in an 8–2 win against Oman at the 2019 World Cup.

As well as continuing to play for Vasco da Gama and winning the Copa Libertadores with the club, among many other trophies in well over a decade with the club, outside of Brazil, Mauricinho has played for numerous clubs in Europe, as is typical of top beach soccer players. He won the inaugural Super 8 in 2012 with Italian side Internazionale, and then later that year joined UAE's Al-Ahli, who in the 2012 season won the national league and Super Cup, and were runners-up in the President's Cup. He participated in the Mundialito de Clubes with Vasco in 2012 and 2013, but joined Flamengo for the 2015 edition and Tokyo Verdy for the 2020 edition, returning to Vasco in 2021.

He played with Rotor-Volgograd in Russian domestic competitions in 2013 and 2014, finishing as Russian Beach Soccer Championships runner-up in the first season and winner in the second; after Rotor-Volgograd folded due to financial problems, he played with Zolotoy St. Petersburg in the 2015 Russian Cup, and finished up the year with the aforementioned Mundialito de Clubes campaign with Flamengo. In 2016, he played in his first Euro Winners Cup (EWC) with Hungarian club Gyöngyös, and then played again for Zolotoy in Russian competitions, making it to the final of the national championships. After a successful Copa Libertadores campaign back with Vasco da Gama, he joined top Portuguese side, Braga in 2017, winning that year's Euro Winners Cup with them. After that, he joined Lokomotiv Moscow in Russia, winning the Russian Championships with them, and then won his second Copa Libertadores with Vasco.

In 2018, he played with Italian team Catania in the Eurasia Beach Soccer Cup, and then joined Kristall for the European and Russian seasons. Reaching the 2018 EWC final against his former Iberian club, he missed the crucial attempt in the penalty shootout, handing Braga the victory. After winning two successive Russian Championships, two successive Russian Cups, and the 2018 Russian Super Cup with Kristall, and an unfruitful 2019 EWC campaign, alongside returning to the Mundialito de Clubes for the first time in five years with Japanese side Tokyo Verdy in February 2020, he redeemed himself in the 2020 EWC, when, in a repeat matchup of the 2018 final, Mauricinho scored to help Kristall become European champions. Though they placed third in the 2020 Russian Championship, they won the Russian Cup, Kristall's fourth in a row and Mauricinho's third with them. He also joined Hungary's Bodon FC for the 2021 Hungarian championship, winning it and being named the MVP.

In the immediate aftermath of Brazil's quarter-final defeat to Senegal at the 2021 World Cup, Mauricinho announced that he would be retiring from the national team, claiming that it "needs some new blood". However, the decision proved short-lived, as he took his place in new coach Marco Octavio's first call-up in May 2022.

After the World Cup in 2021, Kristall won the Russian Cup again, completing the continental treble, Kristall's first since 2015. Then, in October, he participated with Vasco da Gama in the 2021 Mundialito de Clubes.

In 2022, though he again won the domestic double with Kristall, he participated in the Euro Winners Cup with Israeli club Kfar Qassem instead, placing third. He continues to play for Kristall domestically, winning the Russian Championships every year since, along with the Russian Cup in 2023 and 2025 and the Russian Super Cup in 2024, 2025, and 2026. However, outside of Russia, he has played for different teams. He played for Chinese side Dalian BST in the 2023 World Winners Cup. Then, he returned to Italian side Catania for the 2025 Euro Winners Cup, which he won. He played with Paraguayan side Sportivo Luqueño in the 2025 World Winners Cup, Americas Winners Cup, and Copa Libertadores, winning the second and placing third in the third. After Catania's dissolution, he returned to Kfar Qassem for the 2026 Euro Winners Cup.

He also won the World Cup with Brazil in both 2024 and 2025.

== Statistics ==
Note: Some of the sources of these statistics may have counted an appearance when the player was actually an unused substitute.

County

Competition	Year	Apps	Goals	Ref.
FIFA Beach Soccer World Cup	(Portugal) 2015	4	3	
FIFA Beach Soccer World Cup	(The Bahamas) 2017	6	8	
FIFA Beach Soccer World Cup	(Paraguay) 2019	4	5	
FIFA Beach Soccer World Cup	(Russia) 2021	4	2	
Total		18	18	—

Competition	Year	Apps	Goals	Ref.
Intercontinental Cup	(United Arab Emirates) 2013	5	5	
Intercontinental Cup	(United Arab Emirates) 2016	4	7	
Intercontinental Cup	(United Arab Emirates) 2017	5	2	
Intercontinental Cup	(United Arab Emirates) 2018	5	3	
Total		19	17	—

Club

Tournament	Year	Club	Apps	Goals	Ref.
Euro Winners Cup
Euro Winners Cup	(Italy) 2016	(Hungary) Gyöngyös	3	6	
Euro Winners Cup	(Portugal) 2017	(Portugal) Braga	7	10	
Euro Winners Cup	(Portugal) 2018	(Russia) Kristall	7	9	
Euro Winners Cup	(Portugal) 2019	(Russia) Kristall	8	11	
Euro Winners Cup	(Portugal) 2020	(Russia) Kristall	6	12	
Euro Winners Cup	(Portugal) 2021	(Russia) Kristall	8	6	
Euro Winners Cup	(Portugal) 2022	(Israel) Kfar Qassem	7	4	
Euro Winners Cup	(Portugal) 2025	(Italy) Catania	7	12	
Euro Winners Cup	(Portugal) 2026	(Israel) Kfar Qassem	7	9	
Total			60	79	—

== Honours ==
The following is a selection, not an exhaustive list, of the major international honours Mauricinho has achieved:

=== Country ===
- FIFA Beach Soccer World Cup
  - Winner (3): 2017, 2024, 2025
- World Beach Games
  - Winner (1): 2019
- Intercontinental Cup
  - Winner (2): 2016, 2017
- CONMEBOL qualifiers for the FIFA Beach Soccer World Cup
  - Winner (3): 2015, 2017, 2019
- Copa América
  - Winner (1): 2016, 2023
- Mundialito
  - Winner (2): 2016, 2017
- South American Beach Games
  - Winner (1): 2019
- South American Beach Soccer League
  - Winner (2): 2017, 2018

=== Club ===
- Euro Winners Cup
  - Winner (4): 2017, 2020, 2021, 2025
  - Runner-up (1): 2018
- Euro Winners Challenge
  - Winner (1): 2018
- Copa Libertadores
  - Winner (3): 2016, 2017, 2024

=== Individual ===
- FIFA Beach Soccer World Cup (1):
  - Silver Ball: 2017, 2024
- Beach Soccer Stars (2):
  - World's best player: 2017
  - World dream team: 2017
- Mundialito (1):
  - Top scorer: 2017
- Euro Winners Cup (4):
  - Best player: 2017, 2018, 2020, 2021
- Copa Libertadores (1):
  - Best player: 2016
