= 2019 Euro Winners Cup =

Tournament details
- Host country: Portugal
- Dates: 30 May – 9 June 2019
- Teams: 60 (from 1 confederation)
- Venues: 2 (in 1 host city)

Final positions
- Champions: Braga (3rd title)
- Runners-up: KP Łódź
- Third place: Levante UD
- Fourth place: FC Delta

Tournament statistics
- Matches played: 148
- Goals scored: 1,353 (9.14 per match)
- Top scorer: (Italy) Gabriele Gori (26 goals)
- Best player: (Portugal) Jordan
- Best goalkeeper: (Poland) Dariusz Slowinski

The 2019 Euro Winners Cup was the seventh edition of the Euro Winners Cup (EWC), an annual continental beach soccer tournament for men's top-division European clubs. The championship is the sport's version of the better known UEFA Champions League in association football.

Organised by Beach Soccer Worldwide (BSWW), the tournament was held in Nazaré, Portugal from 30 May till 9 June 2019, consisting of a preliminary qualifying round and the competition proper.

Following the qualifying round, the competition proper began with a round robin group stage. At its conclusion, the best teams progressed to the knockout stage, a series of single elimination games to determine the winners, starting with the Round of 16 and ending with the final. Consolation matches were also played to determine other final rankings.

Braga of Portugal were the defending champions and successfully defended their title after beating KP Łódź of Poland 6–0 in the final.

== Teams ==
A record 60 teams from 24 countries entered the championship; 36 qualified straight into the main round whilst 24 competed in the Euro Winners Challenge to attempt to qualify for the competition proper.

=== Entrants ===
Key: H: Hosts \ TH: Title holders

Main Round
SC Braga (TH)	CD Bala Azul	FC Dinamo Batumi	Cartel Waterloo BST
ACD Sótão (H)	Levante UD	Alanya Belediyespor	Linden City BSC Liepāja
Casa Benfica de Loures	CF LA Nucia	Yesil Ercis Belediye	Grande Motte Pyramide
CD Nacional da Madeira	Beach Soccer Egmond	Grodnooblsport	Atlas AO
Sporting CP	BSC Artur Music	MFC Spartak Varna	SK BO EU Teplice
BSC Kristall	BSC Vybir	SK Augur Enemat	CS Djoker
FC Delta	Euroformat-Bodon	BSC Chargers Baselland	Copenhagen BSC
BSC Spartak Moscow	KP Łódź	Rostocker Robben	Baggio
Catania BS	Boca Gdansk	GWP-Bodon-Cservy	Eastleigh Spitfires
Preliminary round / Euro Winners Challenge
CF Chelas	Varzim SC	Real Münster	
GDP Costa de Caparica	Casa Benfica Caldes Rai	LSA Perwez	
AD Buarcos	Sporting CP "B"	New Team BS Brussels	
GD Sesimbra	SC Salgueiros 08	Littoral BS Dunkerquois	
Biblioteca Instrucao	Grupo Desportivo de Alfarim	Marseille Beach Team	
GR Olival Basto	Lokomotiv Moscow	Napoli Patron BSC	
Sao Domingos FC	CSKA Moscow	AO Kefallinia	
GR Amigos da Paz	Atletico Licata BS	Portsmouth BSC	

== Venues ==
Praia de Nazaré (Nazaré Beach) is the host location of the competition for the third year running	Location of Nazaré in Portugal.

Two venues were used in one host city: Nazaré, Leiria District, Portugal.

- Matches took place at Praia de Nazaré (Nazaré Beach) on one of two pitches:
1. The Main pitch, otherwise known as the Estádio do Viveiro (Viveiro Stadium), with a capacity of 1,600.
2. Pitch 2, a purpose made pitch, located adjacent to the main stadium.

== Euro Challenge Cup ==
Euro Challenge Cup
Tournament details
- Host country: Portugal
- Dates: 30 May – 2 June 2019
- Teams: 24 (from 1 confederation)
- Venues: 2 (in 1 host city)

Tournament statistics
- Matches played: 36
- Goals scored: 339 (9.42 per match)
- Top scorer(s): Boris Nikonorov (9 goals)

The Euro Winners Challenge is open to all clubs who did not automatically qualify for the main round as domestic league champions. At least eight teams will qualify for the Euro Winners Cup. Those will be distributed in two groups of four teams. The two top teams will progress to the Round of 16, and the winner of that round will enter the quarterfinals. Beside that, the winner team will be champion of the Euro Winners Challenge.

=== Group A ===
Pos	Team	Pld	W	W+	WP	L	GF	GA	GD	Pts	Qualification
1	CF Chelas	3	2	0	0	1	16	10	+6	6	Main round
2	GDP Costa de Caparica	3	2	0	0	1	14	12	+2	6	Main round
3	SC Salgueiros 08	3	2	0	0	1	13	11	+2	6	
4	Portsmouth BSC	3	0	0	0	3	13	23	−10	0	

31 May 2019	CF Chelas (Portugal)	3–2	(Portugal) GDP Costa da Caparica	Pitch 1
10:15	Miguel Tavares 11'; Fred 25'; Iga 35'	Report	1' Fran; 26' Miguel	Referee: Raul Gonzalez (Spain)

31 May 2019	SC Salgueiros 08 (Portugal)	6–3	(England) Portsmouth BSC	Pitch 1
17:45		Report		Referee: Csaba Baghy (Hungary)

1 June 2019	Portsmouth BSC (England)	6–7	(Portugal) GDP Costa da Caparica	Pitch 1
17:45		Report		Referee: Fiammetta Susanna (Italy)

1 June 2019	CF Chelas (Portugal)	3–4	(Portugal) SC Salgueiros 08	Pitch 2
19:00		Report		Referee: Pierre Bonnici (France)

2 June 2019	GDP Costa da Caparica (Portugal)	5–3	(Portugal) SC Salgueiros 08	Pitch 3
13:00		Report		Referee: Dymtro Dudka (Ukraine)

2 June 2019	Portsmouth BSC (England)	4–10	(Portugal) CF Chelas	Pitch 4
19:15	Mondragon 9', 20'; Wood 16'; Stanley 19'	Report	9' Leo Martins; 9', 16', 24' Aldibasa; 12' Andrezinho; 20', 35' Iga; 22' Miguel Tavares; 27' Marinho; 31' Vassalo	Referee: Roman Borisov (Russia)

=== Group B ===
Pos	Team	Pld	W	W+	WP	L	GF	GA	GD	Pts	Qualification
1	GD Sesimbra	3	3	0	0	0	22	11	+11	9	Main round
2	AD Buarcos	3	2	0	0	1	21	13	+8	6	Main round
3	Napoli Patron BSC	3	0	1	0	2	12	18	–6	2	
4	Atletico Licata BS	3	0	0	0	3	11	23	−12	0	

31 May 2019	AD Buracos (Portugal)	8–3	(Italy) Atletico Licata BS	Pitch 1
09:00		Report		Referee: Roman Borisov (Russia)

31 May 2019	GD Sesimbra (Portugal)	5–4	(Greece) Napoli Patron BSC	Pitch 1
16:30		Report		Referee: David Garcia (Spain)

1 June 2019	Napoli Patron BSC (Greece)	4–3 (a.e.t.)	(Italy) Atletico Licata BS	Pitch 1
16:30		Report		Referee: Antonio Pereira (Portugal)

1 June 2019	AD Buracos (Portugal)	3–6	(Portugal) GD Sesimbra	Pitch 2
17:45		Report		Referee: Ivan Kirilov (Bulgaria)

2 June 2019	Atletico Licata BS (Italy)	5–11	(Portugal) GD Sesimbra	Pitch 3
11:45		Report		Referee: David Garcia (Spain)

2 June 2019	Napoli Patron BSC (Greece)	4–10	(Portugal) AD Buarcos	Pitch 3
19:15		Report		Referee: Malte Gerhardt (Germany)

=== Group C ===
Pos	Team	Pld	W	W+	WP	L	GF	GA	GD	Pts	Qualification
1	CSKA Moscow	3	3	0	0	0	16	5	+11	9	Main round
2	LSA Perwez	3	0	0	1	1	8	13	–5	4	
3	Biblioteca Instrucao	3	1	0	0	2	9	9	0	3	
4	Real Münster	3	0	0	0	3	9	15	−6	0	

31 May 2019	Real Münster (Germany)	2–5	(Russia) CSKA	Pitch 1
15:15	Ali 19'; Alex 32' (pen.)	Report	3' Anderson W. 10', 22' Izaias; 22' Galennikov; 24' Semenov	Referee: Sergio Soares (Portugal)

31 May 2019	LSA Perwez (Belgium)	2–2 (a.e.t.) (2–1 p)	(Portugal) Biblioteca Instrucao	Pitch 1
19:00	Sbaa 17'; Silva Esteves 28'	Report	18', 32' Luis
	Penalties
	Belme (penalty scored); Cepeda (penalty missed); Silva Esteves (penalty scored)		(penalty missed) Alvaro; (penalty scored) Joao Oliviera; (penalty missed) Bruno

1 June 2019	LSA Perwez (Belgium)	6–5	(Germany) Real Münster	Pitch 2
16:30		Report		Referee: Wilson Soares (Portugal)

1 June 2019	CSKA Moscow (Russia)	5–3	(Portugal) Biblioteca Instrucao	Pitch 1
19:00		Report		Referee: Richard De Bruijn (Netherlands)

2 June 2019	Biblioteca Instrucao (Portugal)	4–2	(Germany) Real Münster	Pitch 3
10:30	Bruno 13', 13'; Estrelinha 21'; Pilo 34'	Report	23' (o.g.) Alvaro; 34' Ggullu	Referee: Ali Jabrayilov (Azerbaijan)

2 June 2019	CSKA Moscow (Russia)	6–0	(Belgium) LSA Perwez	Pitch 3
18:00	Galennikov 3'; Ramos 6', 33'; Semenov 13', 22'; Anderson W. 21'	Report		Referee: Eduards Borisevics (Latvia)

=== Group D ===
Pos	Team	Pld	W	W+	WP	L	GF	GA	GD	Pts	Qualification
1	Lokomotiv Moscow	3	3	0	0	0	35	4	+31	9	Main round
2	New Team BS Brussels	3	1	0	0	2	11	18	–7	3	
3	Sao Domingos FC	3	1	0	0	2	12	22	−10	3	
4	GR Olival Basto	3	0	0	1	2	5	19	−14	1	

31 May 2019	New Team BS Brussels (Belgium)	2–11	(Russia) Lokomotiv Moscow	Pitch 1
14:10		Report		Referee: Wilson Soares (Portugal)

31 May 2019	GR Olival Basto (Portugal)	3–5	(Portugal) Sao Domingos FC	Pitch 2
19:00		Report		Referee: Luca Romani (Italy)

1 June 2019	GR Olival Basto (Portugal)	1–1 (a.e.t.) (6–5 p)	(Belgium) New Team BS Brussels	Pitch 1
11:30		Report		Referee: Dymtro Dudka (Ukraine)

1 June 2019	Lokomotiv Moscow (Russia)	11–1	(Portugal) Sao Domingos FC	Pitch 1
15:15		Report		Referee: Gary Christien (Belgium)

2 June 2019	Sao Domingos FC (Portugal)	6–8	(Belgium) New Team BS Brussels	Pitch 3
09:15		Report		Referee: Richard De Bruijn (Netherlands)

2 June 2019	Lokomotiv Moscow (Russia)	13–1	(Portugal) GR Olival Basto	Pitch 3
16:45		Report		Referee: Raul Gonzalez (Spain)

=== Group E ===
Pos	Team	Pld	W	W+	WP	L	GF	GA	GD	Pts	Qualification
1	Grupo Desportivo de Alfarim	3	2	1	0	0	18	13	+5	8	Main round
2	GR Amigos da Paz	3	1	1	0	1	15	15	0	5	
3	Littoral BS Dunkerquois	3	1	0	0	2	15	16	–1	3	
4	Varzim SC	3	0	0	0	3	14	18	−4	0	

31 May 2019	Grupo Desportivo de Alfarim (Portugal)	6–4 (a.e.t.)	(Portugal) GR Amigos da Paz	Pitch 1
12:45		Report		Referee: Csaba Baghy (Hungary)

31 May 2019	Littoral BS Dunkerquois (France)	6–5	(Portugal) Varzim SC	Pitch 2
17:45		Report		Referee: Daniel Yuste (Spain)

1 June 2019	Littoral BS Dunkerquois (France)	4–5	(Portugal) Grupo Desportivo de Alfarim	Pitch 1
10:15		Report		Referee: Mustafa Teker (Turkey)

1 June 2019	GR Amigos da Paz (Portugal)	5–4	(Portugal) Varzim SC	Pitch 1
14:00		Report		Referee: Emmanuel Vocale (Belgium)

2 June 2019	Varzim SC (Portugal)	5–7	(Portugal) Grupo Desportivo de Alfarim	Pitch 3
08:00		Report

2 June 2019	GR Amigos da Paz (Portugal)	6–5	(France) Littoral BS Dunkerquois	Pitch 3
15:30		Report

=== Group F ===
Pos	Team	Pld	W	W+	WP	L	GF	GA	GD	Pts	Qualification
1	AO Kefallinia	3	2	0	1	0	15	7	+8	7	Main round
2	Sporting CP "B"	3	2	0	0	1	10	12	−2	6	
3	Marseille Beach Team	3	1	0	0	2	13	12	+1	3	
4	Casa Benfica Caldes Rai.	3	0	0	0	3	12	19	−7	0	

31 May 2019	Sporting CP "B" (Portugal)	0–6	(Greece) AO Kefallinia	Pitch 1
11:30		Report		Referee: Vitalij Gomolko (Lithuania)

31 May 2019	Marseille Beach Team (France)	7–5	(Portugal) Casa do Benfica das Caldas da Rainha	Pitch 2
16:30		Report		Referee: Malte Gerhardt (Germany)

1 June 2019	Marseille Beach Team (France)	3–4	(Portugal) Sporting CP "B"	Pitch 1
09:00		Report		Referee: Pavel Valyayev (Kazakhstan)

1 June 2019	AO Kefallinia (Greece)	6–4	(Portugal) Casa do Benfica das Caldas da Rainha	Pitch 1
12:45		Report		Referee: Ali Jabrayilov (Azerbaijan)

2 June 2019	Casa do Benfica das Caldas da Rainha (Portugal)	3–6	(Portugal) Sporting CP "B"	Pitch 2
08:00		Report		Referee: Csaba Baghy (Hungary)

2 June 2019	AO Kefallinia (Greece)	3–3 (a.e.t.) (3–2 p)	(France) Marseille Beach Team	Pitch 3
14:15		Report		Referee: Fiammetta Susanna (Italy)

=== Subsequent rounds ===
==== Second group stage ====
The eight qualifiers progressed to the second group stage that took place as part of the main round of the EWC.

==== Final ====
The best two teams of the second group stage advanced to the final that took place as part of the Round of 16 of the EWC.

== Main round ==
All times are local, WEST (UTC+1).

=== Group A ===
Pos	Team	Pld	W	W+	WP	L	GF	GA	GD	Pts	Qualification
1	Jaszfenyszaru GWP Cservy	3	3	0	0	0	16	11	+5	9	Knockout stage
2	ACD O Sotão	3	1	0	0	2	19	14	+5	3	Knockout stage
3	FC Baggio	3	1	0	0	2	10	16	–6	3	Knockout stage
4	Beach Soccer Egmond	3	0	0	1	2	13	17	–4	1	

2 June 2019	Jaszfenyszaru GWP Cservy (Hungary)	6–4	(Netherlands) Beach Soccer Egmond	Pitch 2
18:00		Report		Referee: Vitalij Gomolko (Lithuania)

2 June 2019	FC Baggio (Finland)	2–9	(Portugal) ACD O Sotão	Pitch 1
19:15		Report		Referee: Daniel Yuste (Spain)

3 June 2019	Jaszfenyszaru GWP Cservy (Hungary)	4–3	(Finland) FC Baggio	Pitch 2
19:15		Report		Referee: Wilson Soares (Portugal)

3 June 2019	ACD Sótão (Portugal)	6–6 (a.e.t.) (1–3 p)	(Netherlands) Beach Soccer Egmond	Pitch 1
19:15		Report		Referee: Raul Gonzalez (Spain)

4 June 2019	Beach Soccer Egmond (Netherlands)	3–5	(Finland) FC Baggio	Pitch 3
19:00		Report

4 June 2019	ACD Sótão (Portugal)	4–6	(Hungary) Jaszfenyszaru GWP Cservy	Pitch 1
19:00		Report		Referee: Luca Romani (Italy)

=== Group B ===
Pos	Team	Pld	W	W+	WP	L	GF	GA	GD	Pts	Qualification
1	SC Braga	3	3	0	0	0	13	1	+12	9	Knockout stage
2	BSC Spartak Moscow	3	2	0	0	1	14	9	+5	6	Knockout stage
3	BSC Chargers Baselland	3	1	0	0	2	12	15	–3	3	Knockout stage
4	Linden City BSC	3	0	0	0	3	7	21	–14	0	

2 June 2019	BSC Spartak Moscow (Russia)	6–5	(Switzerland) BSC Chargers Baselland	Pitch 2
16:45	Raskin 14'; Ahmadzadeh 18'; Parkhomenko 20'; Zemskov 22', 27', 36'	Report	11', 26', 34' Ott; 25', 30' Cassemiro	Referee: Emmanuel Vocale (Belgium)

2 June 2019	Linden City BSC (Latvia)	0–7	(Portugal) SC Braga	Pitch 1
18:00		Report	2', 29' Bokinha; 7', 29' Jordan; 18' Torres; 23' Zé Henrique; 27' Filipe da Silva	Referee: Csaba Baghy (Hungary)

3 June 2019	SC Braga (Portugal)	4–1	(Switzerland) BSC Chargers Baselland	Pitch 1
16:45	Jordan 9', 14'; Bruno Xavier 17'; Botelho 30'	Report	2' Hodel	Referee: Daniel Yuste (Spain)

3 June 2019	BSC Spartak Moscow (Russia)	8–2	(Latvia) Linden City BSC	Pitch 2
18:00	Stepliani 2', 35'; Zemskov 10'; Kotov 19' (pen.), 29'; Raskin 21'; Parkhomenko 25'; Josep Jr. 27'	Report	26', 36' Brižaņs	Referee: Antonio Pereira (Portugal)

4 June 2019	BSC Chargers Baselland (Switzerland)	6–5	(Latvia) Linden City BSC	Pitch 3
16:45		Report

4 June 2019	SC Braga (Portugal)	2–0	(Russia) BSC Spartak Moscow	Pitch 1
17:45	Bruno Xavier 13'; Leo Martins 23'	Report		Referee: Raul Gonzalez (Spain)

=== Group C ===
Pos	Team	Pld	W	W+	WP	L	GF	GA	GD	Pts	Qualification
1	Sporting CP	3	3	0	0	0	21	7	+14	9	Knockout stage
2	FC Delta	3	2	0	0	1	19	12	+7	6	Knockout stage
3	MFC Spartak	3	1	0	0	2	12	19	–7	3	Knockout stage
4	SK Augur Enemat	3	0	0	0	3	10	24	–14	0	

2 June 2019	FC Delta (Russia)	8–3	(Bulgaria) MFC Spartak	Pitch 2
15:30	Igor 9'; Aksenov 11', 16'; Peletskii 12'; Pankratov 26'; Thanger 28' (pen.); Soldatov 33'; Tsvetkov 36' (o.g.)	Report	2', 16' Maci; 4' Filipov	Referee: Malte Gerhardt (Germany)

2 June 2019	SK Augur Enemat (Estonia)	3–8	(Portugal) Sporting CP	Pitch 1
16:45	Juha 7'; Mütt 10'; Lukk 21'	Report	2', 15' (pen.) Ricardinho; 3', 34' Belchior; 10', 12' Madjer; 30', 31' Duarte	Referee: Luca Romani (Italy)

3 June 2019	Sporting CP (Portugal)	8–0	(Bulgaria) MFC Spartak	Pitch 1
15:30	Rafinha 2', 26'; Belchior 2'; Lucão 10', 15'; Eliott 18'; Pedro 19'; Coimbra 30'	Report		Referee: Roman Borisov (Russia)

3 June 2019	FC Delta (Russia)	7–4	(Estonia) SK Augur Enemat	Pitch 2
16:45	Aksenov 16'; Igor 17'; Thanger 28', 34'; Soldatov 31'; Zakharov 33', 35'	Report	17', 29' Lepik; 36' Truusalu; 36' Nõmmiko	Referee: Vitalij Gomolko (Lithuania)

4 June 2019	MFC Spartak (Bulgaria)	9–3	(Estonia) SK Augur Enemat	Pitch 3
16:30	Velikov 3', 18'; Filipov 16', 30'; Adamov 25'; Tsvetkov 28', 30'; Dzhambazov 33'; Papastathopoulos 34' (pen.)	Report	29' Kuuse; 31' Lepik; 34' Mütt

4 June 2019	Sporting CP (Portugal)	5–4	(Russia) FC Delta	Pitch 1
16:30	Madjer 2'; 4'; Rafinha 27'; Coimbra 30'; Lucão 35'	Report	7', 27' Thanger; 16' Peremitin; 22' (o.g.) Coimbra

=== Group D ===
Pos	Team	Pld	W	W+	WP	L	GF	GA	GD	Pts	Qualification
1	BSC Kristall	3	3	0	0	0	23	6	+17	9	Knockout stage
2	Grodnooblsport	3	2	0	0	1	9	12	–3	6	Knockout stage
3	CD Nacional da Madeira	3	1	0	0	2	11	18	-7	3	Knockout stage
4	FC Dinamo Batumi	3	0	0	0	3	4	11	–7	0	

2 June 2019	FC Dinamo Batumi (Georgia (country))	3–4	(Portugal) CD Nacional da Madeira	Pitch 2
14:15		Report		Referee: Ivan Kirilov (Bulgaria)

2 June 2019	Grodnooblsport (Belarus)	2–8	(Russia) BSC Kristall	Pitch 1
15:30		Report		Referee: Antonio Pereira (Portugal)

3 June 2019	BSC Kristall (Russia)	10–3	(Portugal) CD Nacional da Madeira	Pitch 1
14:15		Report		Referee: Vitalij Gomolko (Lithuania)

3 June 2019	FC Dinamo Batumi (Georgia (country))	0–2	(Belarus) Grodnooblsport	Pitch 2
15:30		Report	11' Savich; 35' Hapon	Referee: Francisco Henriques (Portugal)

4 June 2019	CD Nacional da Madeira (Portugal)	4–5	(Belarus) Grodnooblsport	Pitch 3
15:15		Report

4 June 2019	BSC Kristall (Russia)	5–1	(Georgia (country)) FC Dinamo Batumi	Pitch 1
15:15	Romanov 9', 15'; Zharikov 33'; Shishin 33'; Mauricinho 36'	Report	31' Benitez	Referee: Sergio Soares (Portugal)

=== Group E ===
Pos	Team	Pld	W	W+	WP	L	GF	GA	GD	Pts	Qualification
1	Catania BS	3	3	0	0	0	24	5	+19	9	Knockout stage
2	Artur Music	3	2	0	0	1	22	11	+11	6	Knockout stage
3	SK Bosnia Online EU Teplice	3	1	0	0	2	7	26	–19	3	Knockout stage
4	Copenhagen BSC	3	0	0	0	3	5	16	–11	0	

2 June 2019	Artur Music (Ukraine)	5–2	(Denmark) Copenhagen BSC	Pitch 2
13:00	Gori 10', 24'; Voitok 24', 24'; Shcherytsia 31'	Report	16' Skøtt; 33' Jørgensen	Referee: Sergio Soares (Portugal)

2 June 2019	SK Bosnia Online EU Teplice (Czech Republic)	0–11	(Italy) Catania BS	Pitch 1
14:15		Report	2', 34', 35' Lucao; 19', 33' Eudin; 21' Fred; 22', 24' Ryabko; 26', 27', 33' Zurlo	Referee: Eduards Borisevics (Latvia)

3 June 2019	Catania BS (Italy)	7–0	(Denmark) Copenhagen BSC	Pitch 1
13:00	Eudin 1', 9'; Palmacci 5'; Zurlo 6'; Palazzolo 11'; Ryabko 20', 28'	Report		Referee: Csaba Baghy (Hungary)

3 June 2019	Artur Music (Ukraine)	12–3	(Czech Republic) SK Bosnia Online EU Teplice	Pitch 2
14:15	Zborovskyi 5', 6', 22'; Gori 9', 15', 25', 25', 26', 34'; Dmais 25'; Voitok 33'; Shcherytsia 35'	Report	12' Henriques; 18' Krok; 29' Addarii	Referee: Mustafa Teker (Turkey)

4 June 2019	Copenhagen BSC (Denmark)	3–4	(Czech Republic) SK Bosnia Online EU Teplice	Pitch 3
14:00	Klausen 1'; Bowes 27'; Jørgensen 29'	Report	17', 23' Addarii; 26', 33' Krok	Referee: Dymtro Dudka (Ukraine)

4 June 2019	Catania BS (Italy)	6–5	(Ukraine) Artur Music	Pitch 1
14:00	Lucao 3'; Eudin 6', 18', 35'; Palmacci 19'; Palazzolo 34'	Report	14' Gori; 28' Zborovskyi; 31', 35' Marinai; 33' Voitok	Referee: Antonio Pereira (Portugal)

=== Group F ===
Pos	Team	Pld	W	W+	WP	L	GF	GA	GD	Pts	Qualification
1	KP Łódź	3	2	0	0	1	18	9	+9	6	Knockout stage
2	Euroformat-Bodon	3	2	0	0	1	16	8	+8	6	Knockout stage
3	Grande Motte Pyramide BS	3	1	0	1	1	12	8	+4	4	Knockout stage
4	Eastleigh Spitfires	3	0	0	0	3	5	26	–21	0	

2 June 2019	KP Łódź (Poland)	4–3	(France) Grande Motte Pyramide BS	Pitch 2
11:45	Paulinho 3', 24', 31'; Gac 34'	Report	2', 32' El Mahrouk; 34' Dhaouadi	Referee: Ionel Boharu (Romania)

2 June 2019	Eastleigh Spitfires (England)	2–9	(Ukraine) Euroformat-Bodon	Pitch 1
13:00	Onoufriou 24'; Villaverde 25'	Report	5', 23' Pachev; 6', 9', 20', 24' Voitenko; 28', 30' Hizhnyak; 34' Zavorotnyi	Referee: Francisco Henriques (Portugal)

3 June 2019	Euroformat-Bodon (Ukraine)	3–3 (a.e.t.) (1–3 p)	(France) Grande Motte Pyramide BS	Pitch 1
11:45	Javi T. 3'; Budzko 9'; Hizhnyak 36'	Report	2' El Hadaoui; 6' Basquaise; 28' Dhaouadi	Referee: Eduards Borisevics (Latvia)
	Penalties
	Yevdokymov (penalty scored); Zavorotnyi (penalty missed)		(penalty scored) El Hadaoui; (penalty scored) Barbotti; (penalty scored) El Mahrouk

3 June 2019	KP Łódź (Poland)	11–2	(England) Eastleigh Spitfires	Pitch 2
13:00	Paulinho 2', 14', 22', 28'; Geteski 5' (o.g.) de Oliveira 17'; Krawczyk 18', 31', 32', 32' (pen.); Poźniak 29'	Report	29' Angeletti; 35' O’Neill	Referee: Sergio Soares (Portugal)

4 June 2019	Grande Motte Pyramide BS (France)	6–1	(England) Eastleigh Spitfires	Pitch 3
12:45	El Hadaoui 1', 14'; Dhaouadi 2', 10'; Grandon 5'; Barbotti 23'	Report	36' Maxwell	Referee: Raul Gonzalez (Spain)

4 June 2019	Euroformat-Bodon (Ukraine)	4–3	(Poland) KP Łódź	Pitch 1
12:45	Nerush 6'; Zavorotnyi 12'; Jesionowski 22' (o.g.); Hizhnyak 24'	Report	2' de Oliveira; 24' Poźniak; 36' Paulinho	Referee: Daniel Yuste (Spain)

=== Group G ===
Pos	Team	Pld	W	W+	WP	L	GF	GA	GD	Pts	Qualification
1	Casa Benfica de Loures	3	1	1	1	0	22	16	+6	6	Knockout stage
2	Boca Gdansk	3	1	0	1	1	15	17	–2	4	Knockout stage
3	CD Bala Azul	3	1	0	0	2	14	13	+1	3	Knockout stage
4	Atlas AO	3	0	0	0	3	17	22	–5	0	

2 June 2019	CD Bala Azul (Spain)	6–6 (a.e.t.) (1–3 p)	(Portugal) Casa Benfica de Loures	Pitch 2
10:30		Report		Referee: Roman Borisov (Russia)

2 June 2019	Atlas AO (Greece)	6–9	(Poland) Boca Gdansk	Pitch 1
11:45		Report		Referee: Erwin Kloosterman (Netherlands)

3 June 2019	Boca Gdansk (Poland)	2–7	(Portugal) Casa Benfica de Loures	Pitch 1
10:30		Report		Referee: Raul Gonzalez (Spain)

3 June 2019	CD Bala Azul (Spain)	4–3	(Greece) Atlas AO	Pitch 2
11:45		Report		Referee: Ivan Kirilov (Bulgaria)

4 June 2019	Casa Benfica de Loures (Portugal)	9–8 (a.e.t.)	(Greece) Atlas AO	Pitch 3
11:30		Report		Referee: Mustafa Teker (Turkey)

4 June 2019	Boca Gdansk (Poland)	4–4 (a.e.t.) (3–2 p)	(Spain) CD Bala Azul	Pitch 1
11:30		Report		Referee: Antonio Pereira (Portugal)

=== Group H ===
Pos	Team	Pld	W	W+	WP	L	GF	GA	GD	Pts	Qualification
1	Alanya Belediyespor	3	3	0	0	0	21	9	+12	9	Knockout stage
2	Levante UD	3	2	0	0	1	12	5	+7	6	Knockout stage
3	Cartel Waterloo BST	3	1	0	0	2	9	19	–10	3	Knockout stage
4	Rostocker Robben	3	0	0	0	3	5	14	–9	0	

2 June 2019	Alanya Belediyespor (Turkey)	7–2	(Germany) Rostocker Robben	Pitch 2
09:15	Brendo 2'; Stankovic 9', 14', 22', 27'; Adil 30'; Ceskin 34'	Report	13' Krötsching; 35' (pen.) Thürk	Referee: Antonio Pereira (Portugal)

2 June 2019	Cartel Waterloo BST (Belgium)	1–6	(Spain) Levante UD	Pitch 1
10:30	Buscema 12'	Report	13' Eduard; 15' Antonio; 16', 18', 35' Fernando; 23' Benjamin Jr.	Referee: Francisco Henriques (Portugal)

3 June 2019	Levante UD (Spain)	3–0	(Germany) Rostocker Robben	Pitch 1
09:15	Eduard 3', 8'; Körner 22' (o.g.)	Report		Referee: Emmanuel Vocale (Belgium)

3 June 2019	Alanya Belediyespor (Turkey)	10–4	(Belgium) Cartel Waterloo BST	Pitch 2
10:30	Stankovic 1', 13', 22'; Kuman 2'; Keskin 7', 10', 11' (pen.); Adil 26', 35'; Brendo 34'	Report	17', 31' Buscema; 17' Wallaert; 35' Brichart	Referee: Csaba Baghy (Hungary)

4 June 2019	Rostocker Robben (Germany)	3–4	(Belgium) Cartel Waterloo BST	Pitch 3
10:15	Körner 15', 27'; Schmitt 15'	Report	2' Vandekerkhove; 11' De Grave; 16', 36' Vlaminck	Referee: Ali Jabrayilov (Azerbaijan)

4 June 2019	Levante UD (Spain)	3–4	(Turkey) Alanya Belediyespor	Pitch 1
10:15	Eduard 4', 8'; Fernando 6'	Report	7' Keskin; 19', 32' Stankovic; 36' Bağcı	Referee: Sergio Soares (Portugal)

=== Group I ===
Pos	Team	Pld	W	W+	WP	L	GF	GA	GD	Pts	Qualification
1	BSC Vybir	3	2	0	1	0	14	12	+2	7	Knockout stage
2	Yesil Ercis Belediye	3	1	0	0	2	13	12	+1	3	Knockout stage
3	CF LA Nucia	3	1	0	0	2	13	14	–1	3	Knockout stage
4	CS Djoker	3	1	0	0	2	15	17	–2	3	Knockout stage

2 June 2019	BSC Vybir (Ukraine)	4–4 (a.e.t.) (3–1 p)	(Moldova) CS Djoker	Pitch 1
08:00		Report		Referee: Sergio Soares (Portugal)

2 June 2019	CF LA Nucia (Spain)	3–2	(Turkey) Yesil Ercis Belediye	Pitch 1
09:15		Report		Referee: Wilson Soares (Portugal)

3 June 2019	Yesil Ercis Belediye (Turkey)	6–3	(Moldova) CS Djoker	Pitch 1
08:00		Report		Referee: Antonio Pereira (Portugal)

3 June 2019	BSC Vybir (Ukraine)	4–3	(Spain) CF LA Nucia	Pitch 2
09:15		Report		Referee: Luca Romani (Italy)

4 June 2019	CS Djoker (Moldova)	8–7	(Spain) CF LA Nucia	Pitch 3
09:00		Report		Referee: Ivan Kirilov (Bulgaria)

4 June 2019	Yesil Ercis Belediye (Turkey)	5–6	(Ukraine) BSC Vybir	Pitch 1
09:00		Report		Referee: Wilson Soares (Portugal)

=== Group J (Euro Challenge Cup qualifiers – Group 1) ===
Pos	Team	Pld	W	W+	WP	L	GF	GA	GD	Pts	Qualification
1	Lokomotiv Moscow	3	3	0	0	0	25	3	+22	9	Knockout stage / Euro Challenge Cup final
2	CF Chelas	3	1	0	1	1	12	15	–3	4	
3	Grupo Desportivo de Alfarim	3	1	0	0	2	14	21	–7	3	
4	GDP Costa de Caparica	3	0	0	0	3	4	16	–12	0	

3 June 2019	Grupo Desportivo de Alfarim (Portugal)	6–1	(Portugal) GDP Costa de Caparica	Pitch 4
16:45	Rodrigo M. 12'; Élson 15'; A. Teixeira 29'; André P. 31', 35'; Rui 33'	Report	33' Ruan	Referee: Emmanuel Vocale (Belgium)

3 June 2019	CF Chelas (Portugal)	1–6	(Russia) Lokomotiv Moscow	Pitch 4
19:15	Fred 20'	Report	6', 22' V. Kryshanov; 11', 35', 36' Nikonorov; 29' Ozu	Referee: Vitalij Gomolko (Lithuania)

4 June 2019	Grupo Desportivo de Alfarim (Portugal)	6–8	(Portugal) CF Chelas	Pitch 4
16:30		Report

4 June 2019	Lokomotiv Moscow (Russia)	7–0	(Portugal) GDP Costa de Caparica	Pitch 4
19:00	Nikonorov 3', 36'; Mamadiev 23' (pen.); N. Kryshanov 24', 32'; Llorenç 24'; Fedorov 35'	Report

5 June 2019	GDP Costa de Caparica (Portugal)	3–3 (a.e.t.) (0–2 p)	(Portugal) CF Chelas	Pitch 2
14:15		Report		Referee: Emmanuel Vocale (Belgium)

5 June 2019	Lokomotiv Moscow (Russia)	12–2	(Portugal) Grupo Desportivo de Alfarim	Pitch 2
16:45	Llorenç 1', 3', 22', 25'; Antonio 8', 9', 33'; N. Kryshanov 16'; Ozu 20'; Safronov 24'; Peletskiy 31'; Mamadiev 36'	Report	8' (pen.) A. Teixeira; 32' Rodrigo M.	Referee: Dymtro Dudka (Ukraine)

=== Group K (Euro Challenge Cup qualifiers – Group 2) ===
Pos	Team	Pld	W	W+	WP	L	GF	GA	GD	Pts	Qualification
1	CSKA Moscow	3	3	0	0	0	19	5	+14	9	Knockout stage / Euro Challenge Cup final
2	GD Sesimbra	3	2	0	0	1	9	7	+2	6	
3	AD Buarcos	3	1	0	0	2	16	13	+3	3	
4	AO Kefallinia	3	0	0	0	3	7	26	–19	0	

3 June 2019	GD Sesimbra (Portugal)	4–1	(Greece) AO Kefallinia	Pitch 4
15:30	Pinhal 14'; Mantorras 26'; Rui 35', 36'	Report	29' Kafantaris	Referee: Richard De Bruijn (Netherlands)

3 June 2019	AD Buarcos (Portugal)	2–5	(Russia) CSKA Moscow	Pitch 4
18:00	Tuma 8'; Félix 31'	Report	6', 8' Kuzmin; 8' Izaias; 8' Kolbanov; 36' Medvedev	Referee: Eduards Borisevics (Latvia)

4 June 2019	GD Sesimbra (Portugal)	5–4	(Portugal) AD Buarcos	Pitch 4
15:15	Cabral 13'; Mantorras 16', 33'; Doutel 24'; Pinhal 33'	Report	13' Hugo Almeida; 27' Ferraz; 33' Tuma; 36' Félix	Referee: Daniel Yuste (Spain)

4 June 2019	CSKA Moscow (Russia)	12–3	(Greece) AO Kefallinia	Pitch 4
17:45	Kolbanov 2'; Anderson W. 6', 24'; Galennikov 14' Izaias 20', 29'; Medvedev 34', 36'	Report	6' Katsoulis; 24' Komiotis; 25'

5 June 2019	AO Kefallinia (Greece)	3–10	(Portugal) AD Buarcos	Pitch 2
13:00	Kafantaris 9', 14'; Triantafyllidis 11'	Report	4' Matos; 5', 13', 21', 29' Mota; 9' (pen.), 30', 36' Félix; 25' Ivan Claro; 31' Hugo Almeida	Referee: Dymtro Dudka (Ukraine)

5 June 2019	CSKA Moscow (Russia)	2–0	(Portugal) GD Sesimbra	Pitch 2
15:30	Izaias 6'; Galennikov 9'	Report		Referee: Pierre Bonnici (France)

== Knockout stage ==
Main bracket

Round of 16
Alanya Belediyespor	1
Spartak Moscow	6
SC Braga	7
Grande Motte Pyramide BS	3
GWP Cservy	1
FC Delta	9
Catania BS	4
BSC Artur Music	3
Vybir	1
KP Łódź	5
BSC Kristall	2 (8)
Euroformat-Bodon (p)	2 (9)
Sporting CP	3
Levante UD (a.e.t.)	5
Euro Winners Challenge
Lokomotiv Moscow	6
CSKA Moscow	1

Quarter-finals
Spartak Moscow	3
SC Braga	5
FC Delta	8
Catania BS	6
KP Łódź	5
Euroformat-Bodon	0
Levante UD	3
Lokomotiv Moscow	2

Semi-finals
SC Braga	8
FC Delta	3
KP Łódź	2
Levante UD	1

Final
SC Braga	6
KP Łódź	0
Third place
FC Delta	6
Levante UD	7

Losers brackets

Round of 16 losers bracket

13th place play-off
Grande Motte Pyramide BS	5
CSKA Moscow	7
15th place play-off
GWP Cservy	4
Vybir	3

13th–16th place semi-finals
Grande Motte Pyramide BS	6
GWP Cservy	3
Vybir	1 (1)
CSKA Moscow (p)	1 (2)

9th-16th place quarter-finals
Alanya Belediyespor	9
Grande Motte Pyramide BS	5
GWP Cservy	7
BSC Artur Music	16
Vybir	2
BSC Kristall	10
Sporting CP	7
CSKA Moscow	2

9th-12th place semi-finals
Alanya Belediyespor	6
BSC Artur Music	7
BSC Kristall	5
Sporting CP	1

9th place play-off
BSC Artur Music
BSC Kristall
11th place play-off
Alanya Belediyespor	4
Sporting CP	8

Quarter-finals losers bracket

5th–8th place semi-finals
Spartak Moscow	5
Catania BS	3
Euroformat-Bodon	0
Lokomotiv Moscow	2

5th place play-off
Spartak Moscow	2
Lokomotiv Moscow	4
7th place play-off
Catania BS	3
Euroformat-Bodon	5

=== Round of 32 ===
5 June 2019
08:00

Jaszfenyszaru GWP Cservy (Hungary)	4–1	(Portugal) CD Nacional da Madeira
Patócs 4'; Schrancz 18'; Besenyei 25'; Fekete 32'	Report	31' Jasmins

Pitch 1
Referee: Mustafa Teker (Turkey)
5 June 2019
09:15

KP Łódź (Poland)	4–3 (a.e.t.)	(Belarus) Grodnooblsport
Krawczyk 5', 16' de Oliveira 10'; Popławski 37'	Report	22' Savich; 29' Kanstantsinau; 31' Chaikouski

Pitch 2
Referee: Dymtro Dudka (Ukraine)
5 June 2019
09:15

BSC Vybir (Ukraine)	7–6	(Bulgaria) MFC Spartak
Levchenko 7', 12'; Levkovich 9'; Shchitnik 11'; Cherevko 12', 27'; Krohmalyuk 18'	Report	7' Dzambazov; 8' Adamov; 9', 25', 33' Maci; 12' Velikov

Pitch 1
Referee: Vitalij Gomolko (Lithuania)
5 June 2019
10:30

FC Delta (Russia)	3–1	(Poland) Boca Gdansk
Aksenov 4'; Igor 7'; Andreev 32'	Report	33' Ziober

Pitch 2
Referee: Sergio Soares (Portugal)
5 June 2019
10:30

Levante UD (Spain)	5–5 (a.e.t.)	(Spain) CD Bala Azul
Eduard 23', 31'; Antonio 35', 39'; Dona 38'	Report	2', 37' Biermann; 10' Paredes; 10' Paredes; 33', 39' Chiky
Penalties
Eduard (penalty scored); Cintas (penalty scored); Hernández (penalty scored)	3–1	(penalty scored) Contreras; (penalty missed) Paredes

Pitch 1
Referee: Luca Romani (Italy)
5 June 2019
11:45

Alanya Belediyespor (Turkey)	6–5	(Switzerland) BSC Chargers Baselland
Brendo 8', 9'; Kuman 13'; Stankovic 27', 34'; Keskin 35'	Report	11', 16' Gabriel; 21', 29' Borer; 30' Stalder

Pitch 1
Referee: Antonio Pereira (Portugal)
5 June 2019
11:45

Artur Music (Ukraine)	5–4	(Turkey) Yesil Ercis Belediye
Gori 3', 17' (pen.), 24', 32'; Marinai 28'	Report	14', 16' Baris; 35' Fabio Costa; 36' Miguel Pintado

Pitch 2
Referee: Daniel Yuste (Spain)
5 June 2019
13:00

BSC Kristall (Russia)	11–2	(Belgium) Cartel Waterloo BST
Rodrigo 5', 34'; Ostrovsky 6'; Zharikov 8', 23'; Mauricinho 21', 35'; Shishin 25', 34'; Kartashov 29'	Report	14' Buscema; 32' de Wolf

Pitch 1
Referee: Vitalij Gomolko (Lithuania)
5 June 2019
14:15

Catania BS (Italy)	10–2	(Finland) FC Baggio
Zurlo 5', 19', 31', 35', 36'; Ryabko 15'; Palazzolo 18'; Chiavaro 21'; Sciacca 32'; Palmacci 35'	Report	2' (pen.), 19' Tiira

Pitch 1
Referee: Roman Borisov (Russia)
5 June 2019
15:30

Sporting CP (Portugal)	10–4	(Czech Republic) SK Bosnia Online EU Teplice
Catarino 8', 25', 27', 34'; Lucão 8'; Belchior 9', 26'; Pedro 17', 22'; Coimbra 24'	Report	9' Formánek; 16' (o.g.) Coimbra; 24', 35' Addarii

Pitch 1
Referee: Raul Gonzalez (Spain)
5 June 2019
16:45

SC Braga (Portugal)	14–0	(Moldova) CS Djoker
Filipe da Silva 1', 13'; Leo Martins 4', 23', 23'; Bê Martins 5'; Zé Henrique 7', 9'; Miguel Pinheiro 10', 33'; Bokinha 20', 20', 35'; Jordan 30'	Report

Pitch 1
Referee: Roman Borisov (Russia)
5 June 2019
18:00

Casa Benfica de Loures (Portugal)	3–7	(France) Grande Motte Pyramide BS
Alves 9'; Lima 11' (pen.); Silvestre 33'	Report	1' El Hadaoui; 19' Barbotti; 23' Dhaouadi; 24' Tillet; 32' Grandon; 33' Fayos; 34' El Mahrouk

Pitch 2
Referee: Luca Romani (Italy)
5 June 2019
19:15

Euroformat-Bodon (Ukraine)	2–0	(Spain) CF LA Nucia
Hizhnyak 10', 23'	Report

Pitch 2
Referee: Antonio Pereira (Portugal)
5 June 2019
19:15

BSC Spartak Moscow (Russia)	6–2	(Portugal) ACD O Sotão
Raskin 4'; Zemskov 10', 10' (pen.), 35', 35'; Ahmadzadeh 12'	Report	20' (pen.) Carmo; 28' Gonzalez

Pitch 1
Referee: Csaba Baghy (Hungary)

=== Round of 16 ===
6 June 2019
09:00

BSC Vybir (Ukraine)	1–5	(Poland) KP Łódź
Levchenko 16'	Report	4', 28' Krawcyzk; 13' Jordan Soares; 18' Popławski; 20' Świdnicki

Pitch 1
Referee: Csaba Baghy (Hungary)
6 June 2019
10:15

Jaszfenyszaru GWP Cservy (Hungary)	1–9	(Russia) FC Delta
Rutai 20'	Report	1', 8' Igor; 9' Thanger; 17' (o.g.) Vernyik; 18' Peremitin; 26' Andreev; 27' Barsukov; 28' Zakharov; 31' Pankratov

Pitch 1
Referee: Emmanuel Vocale (Belgium)
6 June 2019
11:30

Alanya Belediyespor (Turkey)	1–6	(Russia) Spartak Moscow
Stankovic 23'	Report	2' Bazhenov; 15' Stepliani; 23' Josep Jr. 25' Zemskov; 27' Kotov; 34' (pen.) Raskin

Pitch 1
Referee: Sergio Soares (Portugal)
6 June 2019
12:45

BSC Kristall (Russia)	2–2 (a.e.t.)	(Ukraine) Euroformat-Bodon
Mauricinho 16'; Datinha 24'	Report	2' Zavorotnyi; 11' (o.g.) Shishin
Penalties
Datinha (penalty scored); Romanov (penalty missed); Rodrigo (penalty scored); Shishin (penalty scored); Mauricinho (penalty scored); Zharikov (penalty scored); Krasheninnikov (penalty scored); Kartashov (penalty scored); Del Mestre (penalty scored); Ostrovsky (penalty missed)	8–9	(penalty scored) Hizhnyak; (penalty missed) Yevdokymov; (penalty scored) Pachev; (penalty scored) Zavorotnyi; (penalty scored) Voitenko; (penalty scored) Budzko; (penalty scored) Javi T. (penalty scored) Kryvoruchko; (penalty scored) Hladchenko; (penalty scored) Nerush

Pitch 1
Referee: Luca Romani (Italy)
6 June 2019
14:00

Catania BS (Italy)	4–3	(Ukraine) BSC Artur Music
Lucao 3', 6'; Fred 31'; Corosiniti 34'	Report	8', 36' Voitok; 19' (pen.) Gori

Pitch 1
Referee: Antonio Pereira (Portugal)
6 June 2019
15:15

Sporting CP (Portugal)	3–5 (a.e.t.)	(Spain) Levante UD
Catarino 20'; Rafinha 36'; Lucão 38'	Report	4' Sanfilippo; 34' Dona; 37' Antonio; 38' Eduard; 39' Adrian

Pitch 1
Referee: Roman Borisov (Russia)
6 June 2019
16:30

SC Braga (Portugal)	7–3	(France) Grande Motte Pyramide BS
Bokinha 5', 6'; Padliha 14'; Filipe da Silva 16', 20'; Jordan 19'; Leo Martins 27'	Report	2' El Mahrouk; 9' Grandon; 29' Basquaise

Pitch 1
Referee: Raul Gonzalez (Spain)
Euro Challenge Cup final
6 June 2019
19:00

BSC Lokomotiv Moscow (Russia)	6–1	(Russia) CSKA Moscow
V. Kryshanov 13', 18'; Avgustov 15', 27'; Ozu 18'; Nikonorov 23'	Report	20' Anderson W.

Pitch 1
Referee: Sergio Soares (Portugal)

=== Quarter-finals ===
==== 9–16 places ====
7 June 2019
14:00

Jaszfenyszaru GWP Cservy (Hungary)	7–16	(Ukraine) Artur Music
Rutai 8', 21'; Ughy 19'; Vernyik 22', 36'; Patócs 23', 23'	Report	6', 7', 16' (pen.), 22', 26' (pen.), 30', 30' Gori; 12' Dmais; 20', 24', 30', 36', 36' Zborovskyi; 23' Glutskyi; 24' Medvid; 25' Marinai

Pitch 2
Referee: Wilson Soares (Portugal)
7 June 2019
15:15

Sporting CP (Portugal)	7–2	(Russia) CSKA Moscow
Madjer 10', 13'; Lucão 14', 21', 26', 33'; Belchior 25'	Report	17' Medvedev; 19' Melikov

Pitch 2
Referee: Emmanuel Vocale (Belgium)
7 June 2019
16:30

BSC Vybir (Ukraine)	2–10	(Russia) BSC Kristall
Levkovich 13'; Shchitnik 21'	Report	2', 3', 7' Shishin; 5' Zharikov; 8', 13' Rodrigo; 10' Ilinskii; 28' (o.g.) Bagatskii; 32', 36' Mauricinho

Pitch 2
Referee: Antonio Pereira (Portugal)
7 June 2019
19:00

Alanya Belediyespor (Turkey)	9–5	(France) Grande Motte PBS
Kuman 8'; Keskin 11', 17', 23'; Brendo 15' (pen.); Adil 17'; Stankovic 20', 21', 33'	Report	18', 23' Barbotti; 21', 31' Basquaise; 22' Carpita

Pitch 2
Referee: Francisco Henriques (Portugal)

==== 1st–8th place ====
7 June 2019
11:00

FC Delta (Russia)	8–6	(Italy) Catania BS
Pankratov 10', 19', 33'; Igor 13', 28', 29'; Aksenov 16'; Andreev 19'	Report	9' Ryabko; 13', 36' Lucao; 33' Palmacci; 36' Corosiniti; 36' Zurlo

Pitch 1
Referee: Raul Gonzalez (Spain)
7 June 2019
14:00

KP Łódź (Poland)	5–0	(Ukraine) Euroformat-Bodon
Jordan Soares 7'; Gac 17'; Poźniak 26'; Kubiak 33'; Popławski 34'	Report

Pitch 1
Referee: Sergio Soares (Portugal)
7 June 2019
17:45

Levante UD (Spain)	3–2	(Russia) BSC Lokomotiv Moscow
Pajón 3'; Antonio 22'; Benjamin Jr. 29'	Report	4' Ozu; 16' Nikonorov

Pitch 1
Referee: Csaba Baghy (Hungary)
7 June 2019
19:00

Spartak Moscow (Russia)	3–5	(Portugal) SC Braga
Stepliani 3'; Josep Jr. 8'; Zemskov 16'	Report	3', 9' Bokinha; 10' Leo Martins; 27' Jordan; 31' Bê Martins

Pitch 1
Referee: Eduards Borisevics (Latvia)

=== Semi-finals ===
==== 13–16 places ====
8 June 2019
08:30

BSC Vybir (Ukraine)	1–1 (a.e.t.)	(Russia) CSKA Moscow
Levchenko 23'	Report	7' Semenov
Penalties
Bokash (penalty missed); Nikolaets (penalty scored); Bagatskii (penalty missed)	1–2	(penalty scored) Kolbanov; (penalty scored) Melikov

Pitch 1
Referee: Ali Jabrayilov (Azerbaijan)

8 June 2019
19:00

Grande Motte Pyramide BS (France)	6–3	(Hungary) Jaszfenyszaru GWP Cservy
Fayos 5', 5', 20'; Carpita 6'; Barbotti 20'; El Mahrouk 24'; Grandon 35'	Report	5' Ughy; 10' Patócs; 31' Rutai

Pitch 2
Referee: Richard De Bruijn (Netherlands)

==== 9–12 places ====
8 June 2019
09:45

Alanya Belediyespor (Turkey)	6–7	(Ukraine) Artur Music
Kuman 3', 26'; Stankovic 4', 20'; Brendo 22'; Keskin 24'	Report	2' Shcherytsia; 9', 16' Gori; 18' Dmais; 27' Voitok; 31' Marinai; 36' Glutskyi

Pitch 1
Referee: Richard De Bruijn (Netherlands)
8 June 2019
11:00

BSC Kristall (Russia)	5–1	(Portugal) Sporting CP
Shishin 2', 24'; Rodrigo 3'; Ilinskii 13'; Datinha 30'	Report	Catarino 20'

Pitch 1
Referee: Ivan Kirilov (Bulgaria)

==== 5–8 places ====
8 June 2019
12:15

Euroformat-Bodon (Ukraine)	0–2	(Russia) BSC Lokomotiv Moscow
	Report	12' Llorenç; 30' Mamadiev

Pitch 1
Referee: Raul Gonzalez (Spain)
8 June 2019
14:00

Spartak Moscow (Russia)	5–3	(Italy) Catania BS
Josep Jr. 1'; Ahmadzadeh 2' (pen.), 34'; Pavlenko 6'; Kotov 16'	Report	2', 7' (pen.) Lucao; 31' Palmacci

Pitch 1
Referee: Sergio Soares (Portugal)

==== 1st–4th place ====
8 June 2019
16:30

KP Łódź (Poland)	2–1	(Spain) Levante UD
Jordan Soares 8', 33'	Report	8' Fernando

Pitch 1
Referee: Antonio Pereira (Portugal)
8 June 2019
19:00

SC Braga (Portugal)	8–3	(Russia) FC Delta
Leo Martins 4'; Bokinha 7'; Thanger 8' (o.g.); Bê Martins 15', 15'; Filipe da Silva 15', 36'; Jordan 19'	Report	22' (pen.) Andreev; 29' Soldatov; 32' Thanger

Pitch 1
Referee: Daniel Yuste (Spain)

=== Finals ===
==== 15th-place match ====
9 June 2019
09:15

Jaszfenyszaru GWP Cservy (Hungary)	4–3	(Ukraine) BSC Vybir
Patócs 13', 15' (pen.); Besenyei 13'; Fekete 22'	Report	22' Shchitnik; 24' Petrenko; 33' Cherevko

Pitch 2
Referee: Pierre Bonnici (France)

==== 13th-place match ====
9 June 2019
08:00

Grande Motte Pyramide BS (France)	5–7	(Russia) CSKA Moscow
Tillet 6', 26'; Grandon 13'; Barbotti 16'; Carpita 22'	Report	6', 31' Semenov; 10', 32', 32', 33' (pen.) Izaias; 18' Melikov

Pitch 1
Referee: Pavel Valyayev (Kazakhstan)

==== 11th-place match ====
9 June 2019
09:15

Alanya Belediyespor (Turkey)	4–8	(Portugal) Sporting CP
Kuman 3'; Adil 9'; Stankovic 14' (pen.), 16'	Report	2', 9' Lucão; 3', 16' Madjer; 13' Belchior; 27' Rafinha; 30' Duarte; 30' Catarino

Pitch 1
Referee: Roman Borisov (Russia)

==== 9th-place match ====
9 June 2019
10:30

BSC Kristall (Russia)	15–4	(Ukraine) Artur Music
Zharikov 1', 23', 24'; Rodrigo 3', 24', 28', 33'; Datinha 9', 11'; Mauricinho 10'; Romanov 16'; Ilinskii 25', 34'; Remizov 28', 33'	Report	13', 21', 32' Gori; 34' Voitok

Pitch 1
Referee: Wilson Soares (Portugal)

==== 7th-place match ====
9 June 2019
11:45

Catania BS (Italy)	3–5	(Ukraine) Euroformat-Bodon
Chiavaro 10'; Ryabko 12'; Palmacci 18'	Report	2', 22' Javi T. 5' Zavorotnyi; 11', 28' Voitenko

Pitch 1
Referee: Daniel Yuste (Spain)

==== 5th-place match ====
9 June 2019
13:00

Spartak Moscow (Russia)	2–4	(Russia) BSC Lokomotiv Moscow
Zemskov 1'; Josep Jr. 27'	Report	8' Ozu; 21' Fedorov; 24' Nikonorov; 30' Llorenç

Pitch 1
Referee: Antonio Pereira (Portugal)

==== 3rd-place match ====
9 June 2019
15:30

FC Delta (Russia)	6–7	(Spain) Levante UD
Peremitin 2', 22'; Nelito 5' (pen.); Thanger 11', 12', 35'	Report	4' Sanfilippo; 9' Adrian; 12' Eduard; 12' Pajón; 22', 31' Antonio; 34' Dona

Pitch 1
Referee: Sergio Soares (Portugal)

==== Championship final ====
9 June 2019
18:00

SC Braga (Portugal)	6–0	(Poland) KP Łódź
Bokinha 14'; Jordan 25'; Filipe da Silva 29'; Botelho 33'; Bê Martins 35', 36'	Report

Pitch 1
Referee: Raul Gonzalez (Spain)

== Awards ==
Top scorer(s)
(Italy) Gabriele Gori ( (Ukraine) Artur Music)
26 goals^{1}
Best player
(Portugal) Jordan ( SC Braga)
Best goalkeeper
(Poland) Dariusz Slowinski ( KP Łódź)

== Top goalscorers ==
Players who scored at least 10 goals

Goals scored in both the competition proper and the preliminary round are counted.

26 goals

- (Italy) Gabriele Gori ( (Ukraine) BSC Artur Music)

19 goals

- (Switzerland) Dejan Stankovic ( (Turkey) Alanya Beledi̇yespor)

16 goals

- (Russia) Boris Nikonorov ( (Russia) Lokomotiv Moscow)

14 goals

- (Brazil) Izaias Pereira Ramos ( (Russia) CSKA Moscow)
- (Spain) Llorenç ( (Russia) Lokomotiv Moscow)
- (Russia) Dmitry Shishin ( (Russia) BSC Kristall)

13 goals

- (Brazil) Rodrigo ( (Russia) BSC Kristall)

11 goals

- (Brazil) Bokinha ( (Portugal) SC Braga)
- (Brazil) Mauricinho ( (Russia) BSC Kristall)
- (Brazil) Jose Lucas da Cruz de Oliveira ( (Portugal) Sporting CP)
- (Russia) Fedor Zemskov ( (Russia) Spartak Moscow)

10 goals

- (Brazil) Lucao ( (Italy) Catania BS)
- (Brazil) Alves do Nascimento Thanger ( (Russia) FC Delta)
- (Greece) Michail Kafantaris ( (Greece) AO Kefallinia)
- (Italy) Emmanuele Zurlo ( (Italy) Catania BS)
- (Portugal) Andre da Silva Felix ( (Portugal) AD Buarcos)
- (Turkey) Cem Keskin ( (Turkey) Alanya Beledi̇yespor)
- (Ukraine) Igor Levchenko ( (Ukraine) BSC Vybir)

== Final standings ==
Rank	Team	Result
1	SC Braga	Champions (3rd title)
2	KP Łódź	Runners-up
3	Levante UD	Third place
4	FC Delta	
5	BSC Lokomotiv Moscow	
6	Spartak Moscow	
7	Euroformat-Bodon	
8	Catania BS	
9	BSC Kristall	
10	Artur Music	
11	Sporting CP	
12	Alanya Belediyespor	
13	CSKA Moscow	
14	Grande Motte Pyramide BS	
15	GWP Cservy	
16	Vybir	

== See also ==
- 2019 Women's Euro Winners Cup
