= 2017 Euro Winners Cup =

Tournament details
- Host country: Portugal
- Dates: 26 May – 4 June 2017
- Teams: 54 (from 1 confederation)
- Venues: 2 (in 1 host city)

Final positions
- Champions: (Portugal) SC Braga (1st title)
- Runners-up: (Ukraine) Artur Music
- Third place: (Russia) BSC Lokomotiv Moscow
- Fourth place: FC Delta

Tournament statistics
- Matches played: 122
- Goals scored: 1,089 (8.93 per match)
- Top scorer: (Italy) Gabriele Gori (18 goals)
- Best player: (Brazil) Mauricinho
- Best goalkeeper: (Ukraine) Vitalii Sydorenko

The 2017 Euro Winners Cup was the fifth edition of Euro Winners Cup, an annual continental beach soccer tournament for top men's European clubs, similar to that of the UEFA Champions League, organised by Beach Soccer Worldwide (BSWW). The 2017 tournament was held in Nazaré, Portugal, from 26 May till 4 June 2017.

Italian team Viareggio BS were the defending champions but lost in the Round of 16 to Ukrainian side Artur Music.

Artur Music ultimately went on to lose in the final to Portuguese team SC Braga who claimed their first European title.

Gabriele Gori was top scorer for the second year running, following up his top scorer award at the World Cup just a few weeks prior.

== Participating teams ==
25 nations represented by a record of 54 clubs participated in the tournament. 28 teams are qualified directly for the main round, including Viarregio (the 2016 trophy holders), ACD Sótão (as host team), SC Braga (as runner-up of host nation) and 25 national champions (note, BS Lazio clinching the berth of Italy national champions since Viarregio is also a European champion). The preliminary round was disputed by all the remaining teams that sign in (26 teams). At first four more teams sign in, but didn't take part in competition.

Main round
Viareggio BS (TH)	Cadiz CF Sotelo	Ibbenburener BSC	Arman
Sporting CP	BSC Griffin	Atlas AO	Dinamo Batumi
ACD Sótão (H)	BSC Grembach Łódź	Seferihisar Cittaslow	"Falfala" Kfar Qassem
SC Braga (2nd)	Jászfényszaru GWP Cservy	ACS West Deva	RTU
BSC Kristall	Grande Motte Pyramide	FC Valicecar	Glomminge IF
Lazio BS (2nd)	FC BATE Borisov	CS Djoker Chisinau	LSA Perwez BS
Winti Panthers	Silesia St Neots	Betuws BS	MFC Spartak Varna
Preliminary round
Casa Benfica de Loures	BSC Spartak Moscow	KP Łódź	Rostocker Robben
Vitoria FC	CSKA Moscow	ESC Gyongyos	A.P.S. Napoli Patron
CD Vila Franca do Rosario	FC City	Littoral BS Dunkerquois	Alanyaspor
GR Amigos da Paz	FC Delta	Montpellier Herault	BS Lansingerland
CD Nacional da Madeira	CD Bala Azul	BSC Vitoblsport	Littoral BS de Panne
CF OS Belenenses	Levante UD	Portsmouth BSC	
BSC Lokomotiv Moscow	BSC Artur Music	SK Bosnia EU Teplice	

== Preliminary round ==
With an increase in the number of teams, five groups of four teams and two groups of three teams constitute the preliminary stage, competing in a round-robin format. The winners of each group advance to main stage. The group allocations were drawn on 10 April 2017. The matches were held from 26 May till 28 May 2017. Seven group winners and one best-ranked runner-up (BSC Artur Music) advanced to the main round.

Advanced to the main round

=== Group 1 ===
Team	Pld	W	W+	L	GF	GA	+/–	Pts
FC Delta	3	3	0	0	24	5	+19	9
BSC Artur Music	3	2	0	1	28	8	+20	6
SK Bosnia EU Teplice	3	1	0	2	7	27	–20	3
Littoral BS Dunkerquois	3	0	0	3	7	26	–19	0

FC Delta	9 – 1	Littoral BS Dunkerquois
SK Bosnia EU Teplice	0 – 14	BSC Artur Music
FC Delta	10 – 1	SK Bosnia EU Teplice
BSC Artur Music	11 – 3	Littoral BS Dunkerquois
Littoral BS Dunkerquois	3 – 6	SK Bosnia EU Teplice
BSC Artur Music	3 – 5	FC Delta

=== Group 2 ===
Team	Pld	W	W+	L	GF	GA	+/–	Pts
BSC Spartak Moscow	3	2	1	0	20	7	+13	7
Casa Benfica de Loures	3	2	0	1	18	15	+3	6
Rostocker Robben	3	1	0	2	14	14	0	3
A.P.S. Napoli Patron	3	0	0	3	8	24	–16	0

BSC Spartak Moscow	9 – 1	A.P.S. Napoli Patron
Rostocker Robben	5 – 6	Casa Benfica de Loures
BSC Spartak Moscow	4 – 4; 3 – 2 (p)	Rostocker Robben
Casa Benfica de Loures	10 – 3	A.P.S. Napoli Patron
A.P.S. Napoli Patron	4 – 5	Rostocker Robben
Casa Benfica de Loures	2 – 7	BSC Spartak Moscow

=== Group 3 ===
Team	Pld	W	W+	L	GF	GA	+/–	Pts
BSC Lokomotiv Moscow	2	2	0	0	25	3	+22	6
Vitoria FC	2	1	0	1	8	17	–9	3
Littoral BS de Panne	2	0	0	2	3	16	–13	0

BSC Lokomotiv Moscow	9 – 2	Littoral BS de Panne
Vitoria FC	7 – 1	Littoral BS de Panne
BSC Lokomotiv Moscow	16 – 1	Vitoria FC

=== Group 4 ===
Team	Pld	W	W+	L	GF	GA	+/–	Pts
CSKA Moscow	3	3	0	0	22	6	+16	9
ESC Gyongyos	3	2	0	1	21	8	+13	6
BS Lansingerland	3	1	0	2	9	27	–18	3
CD Vila Franca do Rosario	3	0	0	3	9	20	–11	0

CD Vila Franca do Rosario	1 – 8	CSKA Moscow
BS Lansingerland	1 – 12	ESC Gyongyos
CD Vila Franca do Rosario	5 – 6	BS Lansingerland
ESC Gyongyos	3 – 4	CSKA Moscow
CSKA Moscow	10 – 2	BS Lansingerland
ESC Gyongyos	6 – 3	CD Vila Franca do Rosario

=== Group 5 ===
Team	Pld	W	W+	L	GF	GA	+/–	Pts
KP Łódź	3	3	0	0	28	13	+15	9
FC City	3	2	0	1	13	9	+4	6
GR Amigos da Paz	3	1	0	2	13	15	–2	3
Portsmouth BSC	3	0	0	3	9	26	–17	0

GR Amigos da Paz	2 – 4	FC City
Portsmouth BSC	4 – 15	KP Łódź
GR Amigos da Paz	7 – 4	Portsmouth BSC
KP Łódź	6 – 5	FC City
FC City	4 – 1	Portsmouth BSC
KP Łódź	7 – 4	GR Amigos da Paz

=== Group 6 ===
Team	Pld	W	W+	L	GF	GA	+/–	Pts
CD Nacional da Madeira	2	1	1	0	8	6	+2	5
Levante UD	2	1	0	1	7	7	0	3
BSC Vitoblsport	2	0	0	2	6	8	–2	0

CD Nacional da Madeira	4 – 3 (a.e.t.)	Levante UD
BSC Vitoblsport	3 – 4	Levante UD
BSC Vitoblsport	3 – 4	CD Nacional da Madeira

=== Group 7 ===
Team	Pld	W	W+	L	GF	GA	+/–	Pts
CD Bala Azul	3	3	0	0	21	11	+10	9
Alanyaspor	3	2	0	1	14	12	+2	6
Montpellier Herault	3	0	1	2	12	15	–3	2
CF OS Belenenses	3	0	0	3	7	16	–9	0

CF OS Belenenses	3 – 4 (a.e.t.)	Montpellier Herault
Alanyaspor	5 – 6	CD Bala Azul
CD Bala Azul	7 – 5	Montpellier Herault
CF OS Belenenses	3 – 4	Alanyaspor
Montpellier Herault	3 – 5	Alanyaspor
CD Bala Azul	8 – 1	CF OS Belenenses

== Main round ==
With an increase in the number of teams, nine groups of four teams will constitute the group stage, competing in a round-robin format. The group allocations were drawn on 4 April 2017. The matches were held from 29 May till 31 May 2017. Nine group winners and seven best-ranked runners-up advanced to the play-off round.

Advanced to the play-off round

=== Group A ===
Team	Pld	W	W+	L	GF	GA	+/–	Pts
BSC Artur Music	3	3	0	0	18	5	+13	9
ACD Sótão	3	2	0	1	18	8	+10	6
FC Valicecar	3	1	0	2	14	17	–3	3
Glomminge IF	3	0	0	3	6	26	–20	0

FC Valicecar	7 – 3	Glomminge IF
BSC Artur Music	2 – 1	ACD Sótão
ACD Sótão	11 – 1	Glomminge IF
FC Valicecar	2 – 8	BSC Artur Music
ACD Sótão	6 – 5	FC Valicecar
Glomminge IF	2 – 8	BSC Artur Music

=== Group B ===
Team	Pld	W	W+	L	GF	GA	+/–	Pts
BSC Lokomotiv Moscow	3	2	1	0	19	8	+11	8
Viareggio BS	3	2	0	1	27	13	+14	6
LSA Perwez BS	3	1	0	2	8	17	–9	3
CS Djoker Chisinau	3	0	0	3	7	23	–16	0

LSA Perwez BS	4 – 3	CS Djoker Chisinau
BSC Lokomotiv Moscow	7 – 6 (a.e.t.)	Viareggio BS
Viareggio BS	14 – 3	CS Djoker Chisinau
LSA Perwez BS	1 – 7	BSC Lokomotiv Moscow
Viareggio BS	7 – 3	LSA Perwez BS
CS Djoker Chisinau	1 – 5	BSC Lokomotiv Moscow

=== Group C ===
Team	Pld	W	W+	L	GF	GA	+/–	Pts
Dinamo Batumi	3	2	0	1	15	9	+6	6
Lazio BS	3	1	1	1	16	12	+4	5
Arman	3	1	0	2	13	16	–3	3
Silesia St Neots	3	1	0	2	11	18	–7	3

Arman	7 – 4	Silesia St Neots
Dinamo Batumi	3 – 5 (a.e.t.)	Lazio BS
Lazio BS	4 – 5	Silesia St Neots
Arman	2 – 5	Dinamo Batumi
Lazio BS	7 – 4	Arman
Silesia St Neots	2 – 7	Dinamo Batumi

=== Group D ===
Team	Pld	W	W+	L	GF	GA	+/–	Pts
Seferihisar Cittaslow	3	3	0	0	16	10	+6	9
BSC Griffin	3	2	0	1	13	6	+7	6
MFC Spartak Varna	3	1	0	2	12	10	+2	3
ACS West Deva	3	0	0	3	7	22	–15	0

MFC Spartak Varna	3 – 4	Seferihisar Cittaslow
ACS West Deva	0 – 7	BSC Griffin
BSC Griffin	4 – 5	Seferihisar Cittaslow
MFC Spartak Varna	8 – 4	ACS West Deva
BSC Griffin	2 – 1	MFC Spartak Varna
Seferihisar Cittaslow	7 – 3	ACS West Deva

=== Group E ===
Team	Pld	W	W+	L	GF	GA	+/–	Pts
Sporting CP	3	2	1	0	12	7	+5	7
BSC Spartak Moscow	3	2	0	1	18	8	+10	6
Betuws BS	3	0	1	2	11	16	–5	2
RTU	3	0	0	3	3	13	–10	0

Betuws BS	3 – 2 (a.e.t.)	RTU
BSC Spartak Moscow	3 – 3; 2 – 3 (p)	Sporting CP
Sporting CP	4 – 1	RTU
Betuws BS	5 – 9	BSC Spartak Moscow
Sporting CP	5 – 3	Betuws BS
RTU	0 – 6	BSC Spartak Moscow

=== Group F ===
Team	Pld	W	W+	L	GF	GA	+/–	Pts
SC Braga	3	3	0	0	25	4	+21	9
CD Bala Azul	3	2	0	1	10	5	+5	6
Ibbenburener BSC	3	1	0	2	13	16	–3	3
Winti Panthers	3	0	0	3	2	25	–23	0

SC Braga	11 – 4	Ibbenburener BSC
CD Bala Azul	7 – 0	Winti Panthers
Winti Panthers	2 – 8	Ibbenburener BSC
SC Braga	4 – 0	CD Bala Azul
Winti Panthers	0 – 10	SC Braga
Ibbenburener BSC	1 – 3	CD Bala Azul

=== Group G ===
Team	Pld	W	W+	L	GF	GA	+/–	Pts
BSC Kristall	3	3	0	0	19	6	+13	9
Cadiz CF Sotelo	3	2	0	1	16	13	+3	6
CD Nacional da Madeira	3	1	0	2	6	11	–5	3
Atlas AO	3	0	0	3	3	14	–11	0

Atlas AO	0 – 5	BSC Kristall
CD Nacional da Madeira	3 – 4	Cadiz CF Sotelo
BSC Kristall	7 – 5	Cadiz CF Sotelo
CD Nacional da Madeira	2 – 0	Atlas AO
BSC Kristall	7 – 1	CD Nacional da Madeira
Cadiz CF Sotelo	7 – 3	Atlas AO

=== Group H ===
Team	Pld	W	W+	L	GF	GA	+/–	Pts
CSKA Moscow	3	3	0	0	12	6	+6	9
Jászfényszaru GWP Cservy	3	1	1	1	11	7	+4	5
FC BATE Borisov	3	1	0	2	10	12	–2	3
KP Łódź	3	0	0	3	8	16	–8	0

KP Łódź	2 – 7	Jászfényszaru GWP Cservy
CSKA Moscow	5 – 3	FC BATE Borisov
Jászfényszaru GWP Cservy	3 – 2 (a.e.t.)	FC BATE Borisov
CSKA Moscow	4 – 2	KP Łódź
Jászfényszaru GWP Cservy	1 – 3	CSKA Moscow
FC BATE Borisov	5 – 4	KP Łódź

=== Group I ===
Team	Pld	W	W+	L	GF	GA	+/–	Pts
FC Delta	3	3	0	0	17	8	+9	9
BSC Grembach Łódź	3	2	0	1	15	12	+3	6
"Falfala" Kfar Qassem	3	1	0	2	11	12	–1	3
Grande Motte Pyramide	3	0	0	3	9	20	–11	0

"Falfala" Kfar Qassem	5 – 3	Grande Motte Pyramide
FC Delta	6 – 2	BSC Grembach Łódź
BSC Grembach Łódź	8 – 3	Grande Motte Pyramide
"Falfala" Kfar Qassem	3 – 4	FC Delta
BSC Grembach Łódź	5 – 3	"Falfala" Kfar Qassem
Grande Motte Pyramide	3 – 7	FC Delta

== Play-off round ==
=== Bracket ===
Round of 16
(Russia) FC Delta	5
(Ukraine) BSC Griffin	2
(Russia) CSKA Moscow	2 (2)
(Spain) CD Bala Azul	2 (3)
(Turkey) Seferihisar Cittaslow	4
(Russia) BSC Spartak Moscow	6
(Ukraine) BSC Artur Music	4 (3)
(Italy) Viareggio BS	4 (2)
(Russia) BSC Kristall	4
(Georgia (country)) Dinamo Batumi	2
(Russia) BSC Lokomotiv Moscow	7
(Poland) Grembach Łódź	3
(Portugal) Sporting CP	6
(Spain) Cadiz CF Sotelo	4
(Portugal) SC Braga	9
(Portugal) ACD Sótão	2

Quarter-finals
(Russia) FC Delta	6
(Spain) CD Bala Azul	3
(Russia) BSC Spartak Moscow	1
(Ukraine) BSC Artur Music	3
(Russia) BSC Kristall	4 (2)
(Russia) BSC Lokomotiv Moscow	4 (3)
(Portugal) Sporting CP	2
(Portugal) SC Braga	3

Semi-finals
(Russia) FC Delta	5
(Ukraine) BSC Artur Music	7
(Russia) BSC Lokomotiv Moscow	5
(Portugal) SC Braga	8

Final
(Ukraine) BSC Artur Music	5
(Portugal) SC Braga	8
Third place
(Russia) FC Delta	4
(Russia) BSC Lokomotiv Moscow	5

=== Round of 16 ===
The matches were held on 1 June 2017.

Team 1	Score	Team 2
FC Delta	5–2	BSC Griffin
CSKA Moscow	2–2; 2–3 (p)	CD Bala Azul
BSC Kristall	4–2	Dinamo Batumi
BSC Lokomotiv Moscow	7–3	BSC Grembach Łódź
Seferihisar Cittaslow	4–6	BSC Spartak Moscow
BSC Artur Music	4–4; 3–2 (p)	Viareggio BS
Sporting CP	6–4	Cadiz CF Sotelo
SC Braga	9–2	ACD Sótão

=== Quarter-finals ===
The matches were held on 2 June 2017.

For 9–16 places

Team 1	Score	Team 2
BSC Griffin	4–5	CSKA Moscow
Seferihisar Cittaslow	6–13	Viareggio BS
BSC Grembach Łódź	3–4	Dinamo Batumi
Cadiz CF Sotelo	6–6; 2–1 (p)	ACD Sótão

For 1–8 places

Team 1	Score	Team 2
FC Delta	6–3	CD Bala Azul
BSC Spartak Moscow	1–3	BSC Artur Music
BSC Lokomotiv Moscow	4–4; 3–2 (p)	BSC Kristall
Sporting CP	2–3	SC Braga

=== Semi-finals ===
The matches were held on 3 June 2017.

For 13–16 places

Team 1	Score	Team 2
Seferihisar Cittaslow	2–4	BSC Griffin
BSC Grembach Łódź	6–5	ACD Sótão

For 9–12 places

Team 1	Score	Team 2
Viareggio BS	5–3 (a.e.t.)	CSKA Moscow
Dinamo Batumi	1–3	Cadiz CF Sotelo

For 5–8 places

Team 1	Score	Team 2
BSC Spartak Moscow	9–0	CD Bala Azul
BSC Kristall	9–2	Sporting CP

For 1–4 places

Team 1	Score	Team 2
BSC Lokomotiv Moscow	5–8	SC Braga
BSC Artur Music	7–5	FC Delta

== Placement matches ==
The matches were held on 4 June 2017.

For 15–16 places

Team 1	Score	Team 2
ACD Sótão	4–4; 6–5 (p)	Seferihisar Cittaslow

For 13–14 places

Team 1	Score	Team 2
BSC Grembach Łódź	3–1	BSC Griffin

For 11–12 places

Team 1	Score	Team 2
Dinamo Batumi	3–6	CSKA Moscow

For 9–10 places

Team 1	Score	Team 2
Cadiz CF Sotelo	2–4	Viareggio BS

For 7–8 places

Team 1	Score	Team 2
Sporting CP	6–3	CD Bala Azul

For 5–6 places

Team 1	Score	Team 2
BSC Kristall	5–1	BSC Spartak Moscow

For 3–4 places

Team 1	Score	Team 2
BSC Lokomotiv Moscow	5–4	FC Delta

Cup Final

Team 1	Score	Team 2
SC Braga	8–5	BSC Artur Music
Leo Martins 1'; Jordan Santos 11', 32'; Bruno Xavier 18'; Be Martins 20'; Bokinha 24', 30'; Mauricinho 28'		3' Ivan Glutskyi; 4', 11', 30' Oleh Zborovskyi; 9' Deiwerson

== Awards ==
Top scorer(s)
(Italy) Gabriele Gori ( (Italy) Viareggio BS)
18 goals
Best player
(Brazil) Mauricinho ( (Portugal) SC Braga)
Best goalkeeper
(Ukraine) Vitalii Sydorenko ( (Ukraine) BSC Artur Music)

== Final standings ==
Rank	Team
1	(Portugal) SC Braga
2	(Ukraine) Artur Music
3	(Russia) BSC Lokomotiv Moscow
4	FC Delta
5	(Russia) BSC Kristall
6	(Russia) BSC Spartak Moscow
7	(Portugal) Sporting CP
8	(Spain) CD Bala Azul
9	(Italy) Viareggio BS
10	(Spain) Cadiz CF Sotelo
11	(Russia) CSKA Moscow
12	(Georgia (country)) Dinamo Batumi
13	(Poland) BSC Grembach Łódź
14	(Ukraine) BSC Griffin
15	(Portugal) ACD Sótão
16	(Turkey) Seferihisar Cittaslow

== See also ==
- Mundialito de Clubes
