= Maxim Chuzhkov =

Russian beach soccer player

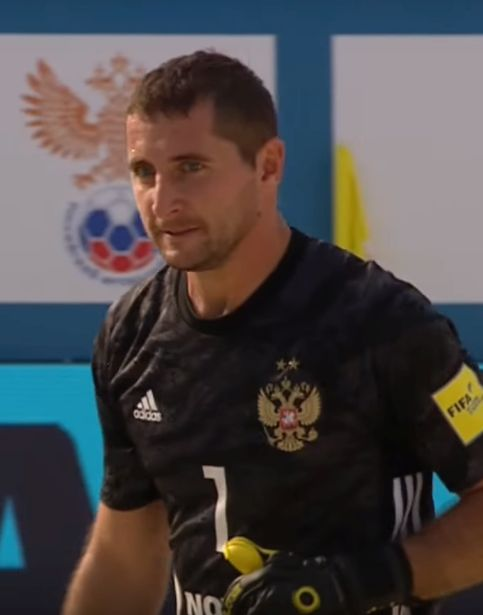

Personal information
- Full name: Maxim Aleksandrovich Chuzhkov
- Date of birth: 11 April 1987
- Place of birth: Samara, Soviet Union
- Position: Goalkeeper

Team information
- Current team: Kristall
- Number: 21

Senior career*
Years	Team	Apps	(Gls)
2011	Krylya Sovetov (beach soccer)	14	(1)
2012–2014	Rotor Volgograd (beach soccer)	62	(5)
2015–2017	Lokomotiv Moscow (beach soccer)	99	(19)
2018–	Kristall (beach soccer)	157	(23)

International career^{‡}
2014–	Russia national beach soccer team	123	(13)
- * Club domestic league appearances and goals as of 20:12, 13 July 2021 (UTC) ‡ National team caps and goals as of 20:12, 13 July 2021 (UTC)

Maxim Aleksandrovich Chuzhkov (Russian: Максим Александрович Чужков; born 11 April 1987) is a Russian beach soccer player serving as goalkeeper. He is a five-time national champion for Rotor Volgograd (1), Lokomotiv Moscow(1) and Kristall.(3)

== Career ==
Maxim Chuzhkov was born in Samara. He was a gymnast for six years before switching to football. Chuzhkov discovered beach soccer in 2010, and one year later he joined Krylya Sovetov from Samara. From 2012 to 2014 he played for Rotor Volgograd, winning with them the club's first and only Russian Beach Soccer Championships trophy in 2014. In the final he shot one goal and after the match he was named best goalkeeper of the championships.

He then switched to Lokomotiv Moscow in 2015. Two years later Lokomotiv became champions, defeating Kristall in the final. Chuzhkov was named best goalkeeper of the tournament. Since 2018, Chuzhkov plays for Kristall, with which he became threefold national champion, when Kristall defeated Delta Saratov in 2018.

In 2019, Maxim Chuzhkov, Artur Paporotnyi, Anton Shkarin and Yuri Krashennikov each scored a goal at the 2019 FIFA Beach Soccer World Cup, resulting to a 7–1 after the whistle.

== Achievements ==
=== National team ===
- FIFA Beach Soccer World Cup champion: 2021
- Euro Beach Soccer League champion: 2014, 2017

=== Clubs ===
- Euro Winners Cup: 2021, 2019.
- Mundialito de Clubes: 2017
- Russian National champion: 2014, 2017, 2018, 2019, 2021
- Russian Cup champion: 2014, 2016, 2018, 2019, 2020, 2021.
- Russian Super Cup: 2018

=== Individually ===
- 2014 Russian National Championships – Best Goalkeeper
- 2015 Russian National Championships – Best Goalkeeper
- 2015 Russian National Championships – Best Goalkeeper
- 2017 Euro Beach Soccer League – Best Goalkeeper
- 2018 Euro Beach Soccer League, Stage 3 – Best Goalkeeper
- 2019 World Beach Games – Europe Qualifier – Best Goalkeeper, Best Assistant
- 2019 FIFA Beach Soccer World Cup qualification – Best Goalkeeper
- 2019 Beach Soccer Stars – Best Goalkeeper
- 2019 Beach Soccer Stars – Best Five
- 2021 Euro Winners Cup – Best Goalkeeper
