= Sotelo =

Sotelo may refer to:

== People ==
People with the surname Sotelo include:

- Pablo Sotelo, vocalist/guitarist of alternative-rock band, Inner Wave
- Beth Sotelo, American comic book colorist
- Gerardo Sotelo (born 1958), Uruguayan journalist
- Guillermo Sotelo (born 1991), Argentine professional footballer
- Gustavo Sotelo (born 1968), Paraguayan footballer who played for clubs of Paraguay, Uruguay, Brazil and Chile
- Julián Sotelo (born 1965), Spanish male javelin thrower
- Luis Sotelo (1574–1624), Franciscan friar who died as a martyr in Japan in 1624, beatified by Pope Pius IX in 1867
- Mauricio Sotelo (born 1961), Spanish composer and conductor
- Miguel Sotelo (1934–2007), Mexican professional baseball pitcher and manager who spent more than 25 years in professional baseball
- Spencer Sotelo, member of the American progressive metal band Periphery
- Gumercindo Álvarez Sotelo (born 1962), Mexican politician from the National Action Party
- José Calvo Sotelo (1893–1936), Spanish jurist and politician
- Karina Labastida Sotelo (born 1976), Mexican politician affiliated with the MORENA
- Juan Sánchez Sotelo (born 1987), Argentine football striker
- Joaquín Calvo Sotelo (born 1993), Spanish journalist and playwright
- Néstor Sánchez Sotelo (born 1901), Argentine producer, screenwriter, production designer and director
- Gerardo Matos Rodríguez (1897–1948), Uruguayan musician, composer and journalist also known as Gerardo Rodríguez Sotelo

== See also ==
- Calvo Sotelo, people with the surname
- CF Calvo Sotelo
- Cadiz CF Sotelo, a professional beach soccer team based in Cádiz, Andalusia, Spain
