= Euro Winners Cup =

- Organiser(s): BSWW
- Founded: 9 October 2012; 13 years ago
- Region: Europe (UEFA)
- Teams: 36
- Related competitions: Euro Winners Challenge; Women's Euro Winners Cup
- Current champions: (Switzerland) BSC 54 (1st title)
- Most championships: (Portugal) Braga (Russia) Kristall (4 titles each)
- Website: Beach Soccer Worldwide
- 2026 Euro Winners Cup

The Euro Winners Cup (EWC) is an annual, continental beach soccer club competition contested between top-division European teams; the clubs that are their country's national league/cup champions (and, for some nations, one or more runners-up) from countries across Europe which are members of UEFA take part. Organised by Beach Soccer Worldwide (BSWW), the championship is viewed as beach soccer's rudimentary version of the UEFA Champions League in its parent sport, association football.

Featuring many of the world’s leading beach soccer players and clubs, the competition is regarded as one of the highest levels of club beach soccer in Europe. Its winners are recognized as continental champions.

Established in 2013 as a 20 team, five-day event, domestic beach soccer advancement in Europe has seen the tournament rapidly expand; in 2017, BSWW introduced a preliminary qualifying round, open to all clubs not automatically qualified for the competition proper. This has doubled the competition's length to 10 days, with over 50 clubs now participating; it takes place on multiple pitches in one location. BSWW also began a women's edition in 2016.

Braga (Portugal) and Kristall (Russia) are the most successful clubs with four titles apiece. BSC 54 of Switzerland are the current champions.

== Organisation ==
=== Founding ===
EWC former logo timeline

2013–2015.

2016–2021.

The idea of the Euro Winners Cup had been "worked on for so much time", finally being founded on 9 October 2012 after an agreement was signed between organisers Beach Soccer Worldwide (BSWW) and the Comune of San Benedetto del Tronto to host the first edition in the Italian city the following spring.

At the signing, Gabino Renales (BSWW General Manager) said with increasing numbers of national leagues across Europe and the growing level of competitiveness within them, taking clubs onto an international scene was something the sport was demanding and hence the Euro Winners Cup was created to satisfy this craving.

=== Qualification ===
From 2013 to 2016, just one club from each European nation qualified – the champions of their highest level of beach soccer competition (be it a national league or knockout cup). The host country was also allowed to enter two additional clubs – the club based in the host city of the event and their national league/cup runners-up. The defending champions also earned automatic qualification regardless of domestic performance. Other runners-up were also sometimes accepted at the discretion of BSWW.

In 2017, the Preliminary Round was introduced – a qualifying stage open to any and all clubs that do not qualify automatically, regardless of where they placed in their nation's domestic league/cup competition. The successful clubs progress to the competition proper.. In 2018 the qualification was transformed into the Euro Winners Challenge, the secondary continental competition that qualify the winner to the EWC quarterfinal (2018-2023) or the following EWC edition (2024-present).

In 2019, BSWW overhauled the qualification system, adopting one based upon the UEFA coefficient ranking used in the UEFA Champions League. In this system, more than one club from stronger national leagues – those featuring higher quality clubs and players – qualify for the competition. The strength of each league is determined by analysing the performance of clubs in the EWC on a country-by-country basis over the previous five editions. Currently, three clubs (league champions, runners-up and third place) from the top six ranked countries qualify to the competition (as of 2022 these are: Portugal, Russia, Spain, Ukraine, Germany and Poland). Two clubs (league champions and runners-up) from the leagues ranked seventh, eighth and ninth qualify (as of 2022 these are: Turkey, Italy and Belgium). And the remaining countries ranked tenth and lower continue to have just one club qualify – their league champions. The preliminary round remains in place, as do additional slots for the host club and defending champions.

In 2020 and 2021, qualification was completely abandoned due to health concerns and travel constraints caused by the COVID-19 pandemic meaning many clubs could not compete. The competition was opened up to simply any club in Europe that was able and willing to participate; the competition format was also altered accordingly for these editions. Since 2022, clubs from Russia have been banned from entering in accordance with sanctions imposed by FIFA and UEFA in response to the Russian invasion of Ukraine.

=== Format ===
Currently, the tournament is a 10-day event taking place in late May or early June and typically operates under the following format:

- Days 1–3: Preliminary round – the participating clubs are split into groups (usually of four) and compete in a round robin format.
- Days 4–6: Group stage – the eight best ranking teams from the preliminary round proceed to join the automatic qualifiers in the group stage. The clubs are split into groups (usually of four) and compete in a round robin format.
- Days 7–10: Knockout stage – the 32 best ranking teams from the group stage advance to the knockout stage. The teams compete in single-elimination matches; the round of 32 (day 7), the round of 16 and quarter-finals (day 8), semi-finals (9) and ending with the final (10). Consolation matches are also played to determine the final rankings involving the clubs knocked out of these rounds.

== Results ==
Year	Location	No. of clubs	Final			Third place play-off		
Year	Location	No. of clubs	Winners	Result	Runners-up	Third place	Result	Fourth place
2013	San Benedetto, Italy	20	Lokomotiv Moscow (Russia)	3–0	(Ukraine) Griffin Kyiv	Beşiktaş (Turkey)	3–1	(Switzerland) Grasshoppers
2014	Catania, Italy	25	Kristall (Russia)	2–0	(Italy) Milano BS	Braga (Portugal)	4–1	(Switzerland) Sable Dancers Bern
2015	Catania, Italy	28	Kristall (Russia)	6–2	(Italy) Catania BS	Vybor (Ukraine)	3–2 (a.e.t.)	(Russia) Lokomotiv Moscow
2016	Catania, Italy	32	Viareggio (Italy)	6–6 (a.e.t.)^{[A]}	(Ukraine) Artur Music	Braga (Portugal)	5–4	(Italy) Catania
2017	Nazaré, Portugal	54	Braga (Portugal)	8–5	(Ukraine) Artur Music	Lokomotiv Moscow (Russia)	5–4	(Russia) Delta Saratov
2018	Nazaré, Portugal	58	Braga (Portugal)	3–3 (a.e.t.)^{[B]}	(Russia) Kristall	KP Łódź (Poland)	4–3	(Russia) Lokomotiv Moscow
2019	Nazaré, Portugal	60	Braga (Portugal)	6–0	(Poland) KP Łódź	Levante (Spain)	7–6	(Russia) Delta Saratov
2020	Nazaré, Portugal	27	Kristall (Russia)	3–3 (a.e.t.)^{[C]}	(Portugal) Braga	Real Münster (Germany)	7–6	(Spain) Marbella
2021	Nazaré, Portugal	50	Kristall (Russia)	6–3	(Portugal) Braga	San Francisco (Spain)	7–4	(Germany) Real Münster
2022	Nazaré, Portugal	60	Benfica Loures (Portugal)	3–1	(Portugal) Braga	Kfar Qassem (Israel)	7–2	(France) Grande-Motte Pyramide
2023	Nazaré, Portugal	52	Kfar Qassem (Israel)	2–2 (a.e.t.)^{[D]}	(Italy) Pisa	O Sótão (Portugal)	3–2	(Spain) Huelva
2024	Nazaré, Portugal	56	Braga (Portugal)	5–3	(Italy) Pisa	O Sótão (Portugal)	7–4	(Spain) Huelva
2025	Nazaré, Portugal	36	Catania (Italy)	6–1	(Israel) Kfar Qassem	TSOR Mogilev (Belarus)	2–2 (a.e.t.)^{[E]}	(Spain) Marbella
2026	Nazaré, Portugal	36	BSC 54 (Switzerland)	6–4	(Belarus) Minsk	Pisa (Italy)	9–6	(Israel) Kfar Qassem

A. Viareggio won the penalty shootout 7–6.
B. Braga won the penalty shootout 5–4.
C. Kristall won the penalty shootout 1–0.
D. Kfar Qassem won the penalty shootout 5–3.
E. TSOR Mogilev won the penalty shootout 5–4.

== Performance ==
=== Successful clubs ===
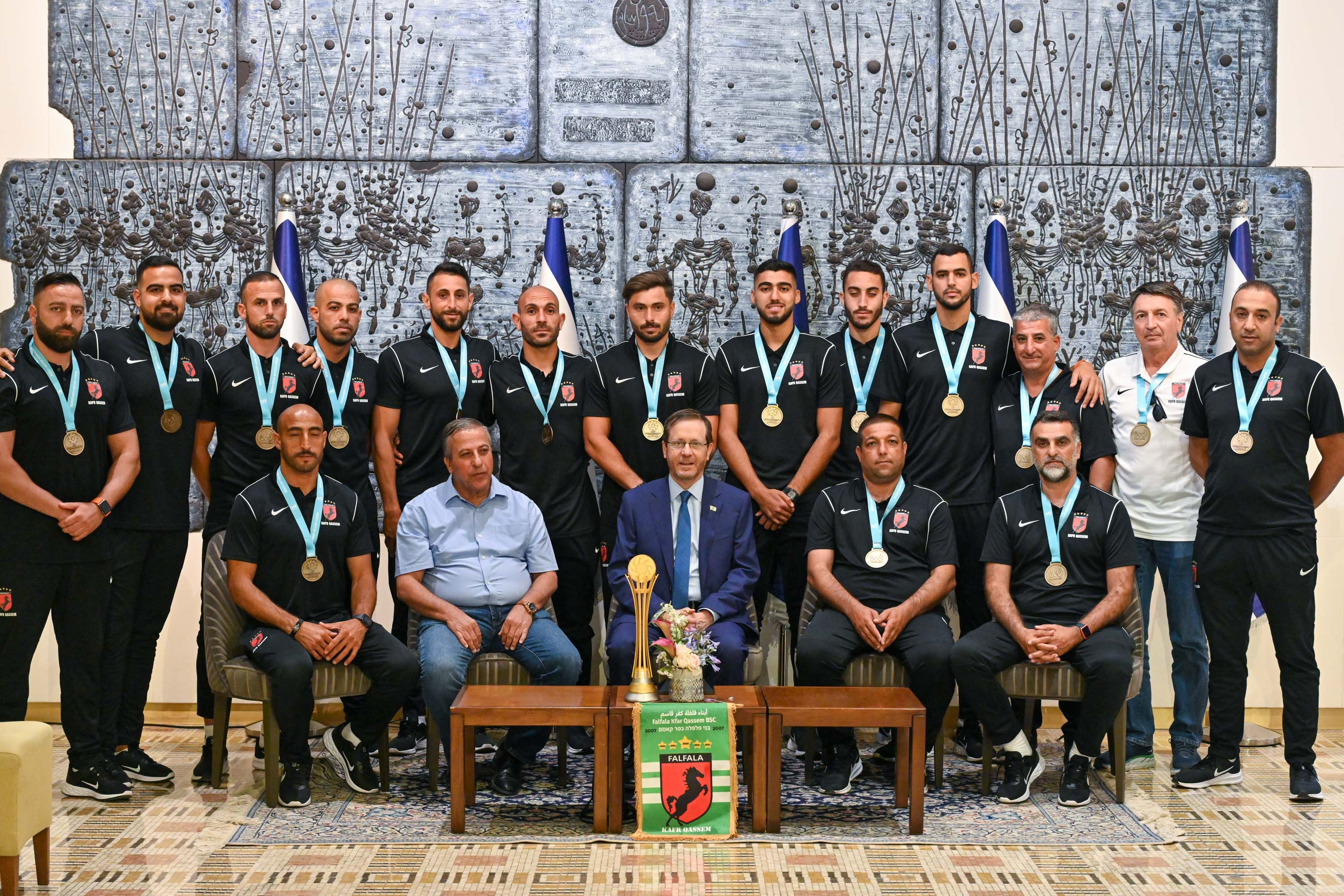
Select members of Kfar Qassem pose with the winners trophy and medals at a reception with Isaac Herzog at Beit HaNassi following their victory in 2023.

Team	Winners	Runners-up	Third place
(Portugal) Braga	4 (2017, 2018, 2019, 2024)	3 (2020, 2021, 2022)	2 (2014, 2016)
(Russia) Kristall	4 (2014, 2015, 2020, 2021)	1 (2018)	–
(Israel) Kfar Qassem	1 (2023)	1 (2025)	1 (2022)
(Italy) Catania	1 (2025)	1 (2015)	–
(Russia) Lokomotiv Moscow	1 (2013)	–	1 (2017)
(Switzerland) BSC 54	1 (2026)	–	–
(Portugal) Benfica Loures	1 (2022)	–	–
(Italy) Viareggio	1 (2016)	–	–
(Italy) Pisa	–	2 (2023, 2024)	1 (2026)
(Ukraine) Artur Music	–	2 (2016, 2017)	–
(Poland) KP Łódź	–	1 (2019)	1 (2018)
(Belarus) Minsk	–	1 (2026)	–
(Italy) Milano	–	1 (2014)	–
(Ukraine) Griffin Kyiv	–	1 (2013)	–
(Portugal) O Sótão	–	–	2 (2023, 2024)
(Belarus) TSOR Mogilev	–	–	1 (2025)
(Spain) San Francisco	–	–	1 (2021)
(Germany) Real Münster	–	–	1 (2020)
(Spain) Levante	–	–	1 (2019)
(Ukraine) Vybor	–	–	1 (2015)
(Turkey) Beşiktaş	–	–	1 (2013)

=== Successful nations ===
Nation	Winners	Runners-up	Third place
Portugal	5	3	4
Russia	5	1	1
Italy	2	4	1
Israel	1	1	1
Switzerland	1	0	0
Ukraine	0	3	1
Belarus	0	1	1
Poland	0	1	1
Spain	0	0	2
Germany	0	0	1
Turkey	0	0	1

=== Awards ===
Year	Top goalscorer(s)	Gls	Best player	Best goalkeeper	Ref.
2013	(Switzerland) Dejan Stankovic ( (Switzerland) Grasshoppers)	13	(Russia) Egor Shaykov ( (Russia) Lokomotiv Moscow)	(Ukraine) Vitalii Sydorenko ( (Ukraine) Griffin Kyiv)	
2014	(Portugal) Léo Martins ( (Italy) Milano)	13	(Brazil) Bruno Xavier ( (Russia) Kristall)	(Spain) Dona ( (Portugal) Braga)	
2015	(Belarus) Ihar Bryshtel ( (Ukraine) Vybor)	14	(Brazil) Datinha ( (Russia) Kristall)	(Italy) Simone Del Mestre ( (Italy) Catania)	
2016	(Italy) Gabriele Gori ( (Italy) Viareggio)	18	(Brazil) Rodrigo ( (Italy) Catania)	(Ukraine) Vitalii Sydorenko ( (Ukraine) Artur Music)	
2017	(Italy) Gabriele Gori ( (Italy) Viareggio)	18	(Brazil) Mauricinho ( (Portugal) Braga)	(Ukraine) Vitalii Sydorenko ( (Ukraine) Artur Music)	
2018	(Spain) Llorenç Gómez ( (Israel) Kfar Qassem)	16	(Brazil) Mauricinho ( (Russia) Kristall)	(Spain) Dona ( (Portugal) Braga)	
2019	(Italy) Gabriele Gori ( (Ukraine) Artur Music)	26	(Portugal) Jordan Santos ( (Portugal) Braga)	(Poland) Dariusz Słowiński ( (Poland) KP Łódź)	
2020	(Spain) Llorenç Gómez ( (Ukraine) Artur Music)	22	(Brazil) Mauricinho ( (Russia) Kristall)	(Brazil) Rafa Padilha ( Braga)	
2021	(Portugal) Bernardo Lopes ( (Portugal) GRAP)	18	(Brazil) Mauricinho ( (Russia) Kristall)	(Russia) Maxim Chuzhkov ( (Russia) Kristall)	
2022	(Bulgaria) Filip Filipov ( (Slovakia) Husty)	17	(Brazil) Luís Henrique ( (Portugal) Benfica Loures)	(Portugal) Elinton Andrade ( (Portugal) Benfica Loures)	
2023	(Brazil) Bokinha ( (Greece) Atlas AO)	18	(Brazil) Bruno Xavier ( (Italy) Pisa)	(Switzerland) Eliott Mounoud ( (Israel) Kfar Qassem)	
2024	(Spain) Chiky Ardil ( (Portugal) O Sótão)	15	(Brazil) Filipe Silva ( (Portugal) Braga)	(Italy) Leandro Casapieri ( (Italy) Pisa)	
2025	(Brazil) Lucão ( (Israel) Rosh HaAyin)	14	(Brazil) Thanger ( (Italy) Catania)	(Brazil) Rafa Padilha ( (Italy) Catania)	
2026	(Brazil) Brendo ( (Germany) Beach Royals)	32	(Switzerland) Glenn Hodel ( (Switzerland) BSC 54)	(Belarus) Mikhail Avgustov ( (Belarus) Minsk)	

=== Appearances and performance timeline ===
The following is an appearance and performance timeline of the countries who have been represented by clubs at the Euro Winners Cup. It shows which countries were represented at each edition and by how many clubs. The colour of the cells indicates the furthest any of that country's clubs progressed in the competition in that edition, corresponding to the key below. Clubs which did not progress passed the preliminary round are not counted.

34 members of UEFA have been represented by at least one club in at least one edition to date.

Key

Champions		Round of 32^{[b]}
Runners-up		Group stage
Third place	$n$	No. of clubs entered
Fourth place	×	Did not enter a club
Quarter-finals	••	Banned from entering
Round of 16^{[a]}		Host country

a. Not used in 2013.
b. Not used in 2013–18, 20, 22, 24–26.

Timeline

Years Country	2013	2014	2015	2016	2017	2018	2019	2020	2021	2022	2023	2024	2025	2026	Total
Azerbaijan	1	×	1	×	×	×	×	×	×	×	×	×	×	×	2
Belarus	1	1	1	1	1	1	1	×	×	×	×	1	1	1	10
Belgium	×	×	1	1	1	1	1	2	3	2	2	1	×	×	15
Bulgaria	×	1	1	1	1	1	1	×	1	1	1	1	1	1	12
Cyprus	×	×	×	×	×	×	×	×	×	×	1	1	1	1	4
(Czech Republic) Czech Republic	×	1	1	×	×	1	1	×	1	1	1	1	1	1	10
Denmark	×	×	×	1	×	1	1	×	1	1	×	×	1	×	6
England	1	1	1	2	1	×	1	1	×	1	1	×	1	1	12
Estonia	×	1	1	1	1	1	1	×	×	1	1	×	1	×	9
Finland	×	×	×	×	×	×	1	×	×	1	×	1	1	1	5
France	1	1	1	1	1	1	1	1	3	2	4	3	3	3	26
(Georgia (country)) Georgia	×	×	1	1	1	1	1	×	2	×	1	1	1	×	10
Germany	×	1	1	1	1	1	1	3	2	4	3	3	3	3	27
Greece	1	1	1	1	1	1	2	1	1	2	2	1	1	1	17
Hungary	1	1	1	1	1	×	1	×	×	×	×	1	×	1	8
Israel	1	1	×	1	1	1	×	×	2	2	1	2	2	2	16
Italy	3	3	3	3	2	3	1	×	1	2	3	4	2	2	32
Kazakhstan	×	1	1	×	1	×	×	×	×	1	×	×	1	×	5
Latvia	1	1	×	1	1	1	1	×	×	×	1	1	×	×	8
Lithuania	×	×	×	1	×	1	×	×	×	1	×	×	×	×	3
Malta	×	×	×	×	×	×	×	×	×	×	1	×	1	1	3
Moldova	1	1	1	1	1	1	1	2	2	1	1	1	1	1	16
Netherlands	1	1	×	1	1	1	1	×	×	×	×	1	1	1	9
Norway	×	×	×	×	×	1	×	×	×	×	×	×	1	1	3
Poland	1	1	2	2	2	2	2	×	×	1	×	×	×	1	14
Portugal	1	1	1	1	4	5	10	7	17	9	8	4	4	3	75
Romania	×	×	1	1	1	1	×	1	×	1	1	1	×	×	8
Russia	1	2	2	3	5	2	5	2	4	••	••	••	••	••	26
Slovakia	×	×	×	×	×	×	×	×	×	1	1	1	1	1	5
Spain	1	1	2	1	2	2	3	2	5	3	3	3	3	3	34
Sweden	×	×	×	×	1	×	×	1	2	1	×	1	×	×	6
Switzerland	1	1	1	2	1	×	1	1	×	×	×	1	×	1	10
Turkey	1	1	1	1	1	1	2	×	×	1	1	1	1	2	14
Ukraine	1	1	1	1	2	2	3	3	3	×	2	×	2	2	23
Total teams	20	25	28	32	36	34	44	27	50	40	40	36	36	35	483
Total countries	18	22	23	25	25	24	24	13	16	22	21	23	24	23	—

== See also ==
- Euro Winners Challenge
- Women's Euro Winners Cup
- Copa Libertadores de Beach Soccer
- World Winners Cup
- UEFA Futsal Champions League
