= Russian Beach Soccer Championships =

- Founded: 2005
- Country: Russia
- Confederation: UEFA
- Number of clubs: 9
- Domestic cup: Russian Cup
- International cup: Euro Winners Cup
- Current champions: Kristall St. Petersburg (7th title) (2022)
- Most championships: Kristall St. Petersburg (7 titles)
- Website: bsrussia.com
- Current: 2023 Russian Beach Soccer Championships

The Russian Beach Soccer Championships (Russian: Чемпионат России по пляжному футболу) are the main national beach soccer championships in Russia. They are performed annually since 2005. Overall, 9 clubs (formerly 16 and 8 clubs) qualified through regional championships participate. They are divided into four groups, each composed of four teams, and two of the best clubs in each team will reach the quarterfinals. The winner is decided after a series of play-off rounds.

== Regulations ==
Formerly, 16 teams participated in the main round. At times there were qualifying rounds. The number of teams was reduced to 8 in 2011.

A new system was introduced in the 2014 season. Now the eight teams played two legs. There were overall 14 rounds which were split into 3 stages. Each win in regular time was calculated as three points, a win in overtime or after a series of penalties two points, a loss in the overtime or after a series of penalties one point. The four best teams qualified for the quarterfinals, the so-called Superfinal, which was played in the play-off system. In the semi-finals and the final there were two wins to be made in each round. The third-place game was played as a single-elimination round. The teams who reached the two worst places were pulled out from this tournament in the next year, and they were to be replaced by the winners of the Russian Cup, the second-highest ranked national tournament.

In the 2015 season, a new system of point calculation was introduced. Now, two points were given for a win in the overtime, one point after a series of penalties and zero points for any loss. Also, overall three sportsmen of a foreign club (a "legionnaire") were allowed to play in a club, two of which may play at one time in a pitch. Furthermore, each club received an opportunity to take a one-minute time out once during a game.

In the 2017 season, overall nine clubs participated, six of which qualified for the Superfinal. The two best teams of the regular season automatically entered the semi-final, while the remaining four teams played in the quarterfinals.

== Men's Championships ==
=== Tournaments ===
Year	Host	Final			3rd place match			Teams
Year	Host	Champions	Score	Runners-up	3rd place	Score	4th place	Teams
2005	Anapa	City Khimik Voronezh Oblast	3–2	Dream Team MFTI Moscow	Delta Saratov	7–4	Lipetsk	16
2006	Sochi	TIM St. Petersburg	2–1 (1–0)	Strogino Moscow	CITY MFTI Moscow	8–5	Dream Team MFTI Moscow	16
2007	Sochi	IBS St. Petersburg	3–2	Strogino Moscow	TIM St. Petersburg	5–1	Delta Saratov	16
2008	Sochi	Strogino Moscow	4–3	Delta Saratov	Biznes-Pravo Saratov	7–5	Lukoyl Kaliningrad	16
2009	Sochi	Strogino Moscow	5–3	IBS St. Petersburg	Lukoyl Kaliningrad	9–1	Delta Saratov	16
2010	Anapa	Lokomotiv Moscow	3–2 (1–0)	Strogino Moscow	Golden St. Petersburg	3–2	Delta Saratov	16
2011	St. Petersburg	Lokomotiv Moscow	11–8	Strogino Moscow	Krylya Sovetov Samara	4–3	Delta Saratov	8
2012	St. Petersburg	Lokomotiv Moscow	5–3	Kristall St. Petersburg	Strogino Moscow	5–4	IBS St. Petersburg	8
2013	Moscow	Kristall St. Petersburg	6–4 (OT)	Rotor-Volgograd	Lokomotiv Moscow	5–2	Dynamo Moscow	8
2014	Volgograd	Rotor-Volgograd	6–2; 5–3; 4–2	Kristall St. Petersburg	Strogino Moscow	3–1	Lokomotiv Moscow	8
2015	Sochi	Kristall St. Petersburg	6–2; 5–3	Krylya Sovetov Samara	Lokomotiv Moscow	3–2	Dynamo Moscow	8
2016	St. Petersburg	Kristall St. Petersburg	5–3; 3–1	Zolotoy St. Petersburg	Lokomotiv Moscow	6–3	Spartak Moscow	8
2017	Saratov	Lokomotiv Moscow	5–3; 4–1	Kristall St. Petersburg	CSKA Moscow	3–2	Spartak Moscow	9
2018	Moscow	Kristall St. Petersburg	4–1	Delta Saratov	Spartak Moscow	4–1	CSKA Moscow	9
2019	Samara	Kristall St. Petersburg	6–5	Spartak Moscow	Krylya Sovetov Samara	3–1	Lokomotiv Moscow	8
2020	St. Petersburg	Lokomotiv Moscow	4–3	Spartak Moscow	Kristall St. Petersburg	7–3	Delta Saratov	6
2021	Moscow	Kristall St. Petersburg	3–0	Delta Saratov	Lokomotiv Moscow	7–5	Spartak Moscow	6

=== Team statistics ===
Club	Wins	Finals	3rd places	Overall
Kristall St. Petersburg	7 (2013, 2015, 2016, 2018, 2019, 2021, 2022)	3 (2012, 2014, 2017)	1 (2020)	11
Lokomotiv Moscow	5 (2010, 2011, 2012, 2017, 2020)	1 (2022)	4 (2013, 2015, 2016, 2021)	10
Strogino Moscow	2 (2008, 2009)	4 (2006, 2007, 2010, 2011)	2 (2012, 2014)	8
Rotor-Volgograd	1 (2014)	1 (2013)	—	2
IBS St. Petersburg	1 (2007)	1 (2009)	—	2
TIM St. Petersburg	1 (2006)	—	1 (2007)	2
Siti Khimik Voronezh Oblast	1 (2005)	—	—	1
Delta Saratov	—	3 (2008, 2018, 2021)	1 (2005)	4
Spartak Moscow	—	2 (2019, 2020)	1 (2018)	3
Krylya Sovetov Samara	—	1 (2015)	2 (2011, 2019)	3
Zolotoy St. Petersburg	—	1 (2016)	—	1
Dream Team MFTI Moscow	—	1 (2005)	—	1
CSKA Moscow	—	—	2 (2017, 2022)	2
Golden St. Petersburg	—	—	1 (2010)	1
Lukoyl Kaliningrad	—	—	1 (2009)	1
Biznes-Pravo Saratov	—	—	1 (2008)	1
CITY MFTI Moscow	—	—	1 (2006)	1

== Women's Championships ==
=== Tournaments ===
Year	Host	Final			3rd place match			Teams
Year	Host	Champions	Score	Runners-up	3rd place	Score	4th place	Teams
2013	St. Petersburg	Lokomotiv Moscow	6–1	Kristall St. Petersburg	WFC City	4–3	DYUSSH-75 Moscow	8
2014	Anapa	Olimpik Krasnodar	N/A	Neva City St. Petersburg	Kristall St. Petersburg	N/A	Lokomotiv Moscow	6
2015	Moscow	Zvezda St. Petersburg	N/A	Rusbalt Moscow	Torpedo Moscow	N/A	RGAU-MSKHA Moscow	6
2016	St. Petersburg	Neva St. Petersburg	N/A	Zvezda St. Petersburg	Severnyy Press St. Petersburg	N/A	Alfa-09 Kaliningrad	5
2017	Kazan	Zvezda St. Petersburg	7–4	Drayv 32 Bryansk	Alfa-09 Kaliningrad	4–1	Neva St. Petersburg	8
2018	Moscow	Zvezda St. Petersburg	6–1	Neva St. Petersburg	Alfa-09 Kaliningrad	5–1	Drayv 32 Bryansk	6
2019	Moscow	Zvezda St. Petersburg	7–1	Lex-Yablochnaya St. Petersburg	Strogino Moscow	7–1	Mospolitekh Moscow	10
2020	Moscow	Zvezda St. Petersburg	3–2	Lex-Yablochnaya St. Petersburg	Strogino Moscow	6–1	Alpha 09	8

=== Team statistics ===
Club	Wins	Finals	3rd places	Overall
Zvezda St. Petersburg	5 (2015, 2017, 2018, 2019, 2020)	1 (2016)	—	6
Neva St. Petersburg	1 (2016)	2 (2014, 2018)	–	3
Lokomotiv Moscow	1 (2013)	—	—	1
Olimpik Krasnodar	1 (2014)	—	—	1
Kristall St. Petersburg	—	1 (2013)	1 (2014)	2
Lex-Yablochnaya St. Petersburg	—	2 (2019, 2020)	—	2
Drayv 32 Bryansk	—	1 (2017)	—	1
Rusbalt Moscow	—	1 (2015)	—	1
Alfa-09 Kaliningrad	—	—	2 (2017, 2018)	2
Strogino Moscow	—	—	2 (2019, 2020)	2
Severnyy Press St. Petersburg	—	—	1 (2016)	1
WFC City	—	—	1 (2013)	1
Torpedo Moscow	—	—	1 (2015)	1
