= BSC Artur Music =

Artur Music
- Full name: BSC Artur Music
- Coach: Yura Chudnovets
- League: Ukrainian Beach Soccer Premier League
Home colours	Away colours

BSC Artur Music is a professional beach soccer team based in Kyiv, Ukraine. The club sponsor is the music label Artur Music.

== 2023 Euro Winners Cup squad ==
Note: Flags indicate national team as defined under FIFA eligibility rules; some limited exceptions apply. Players may hold more than one non-FIFA nationality.

No.	Pos.	Nation	Player
1	GK	(Ukraine) UKR	Sergey Tymoshenko
4	FW	(Ukraine) UKR	Andriy Potapov
7	FW	(Ukraine) UKR	Igor Borsuk
8	FW	(Brazil) BRA	Lucas Duarte
9	FW	(Ukraine) UKR	Oleg Zborovskiy
10	FW	(Brazil) BRA	Igor Rangel

No.	Pos.	Nation	Player
11	DF	(Brazil) BRA	Balinha
15	FW	(Ukraine) UKR	Dmytro Voitenko
16	DF	(Ukraine) UKR	Ruslan Niftaliiev
17	GK	(Ukraine) UKR	Andriy Nerush
19	DF	(Ukraine) UKR	Andriy Borsuk
22	GK	(Ukraine) UKR	Vitaliy Sydorenko (captain)

Coach: Yura Chudnovets

== Honours ==
=== National competitions ===
Ukrainian Beach Soccer Premier League

- Winners (1): 2013
- Runners-up (1): 2016

=== European competitions ===
Euro Winners Cup

- Runners-up (2): 2016, 2017
