= BSC Kristall =

- Full name: BSC Kristall
- Ground: Nova Arena
- Capacity: 2,000
- Chairman: (Russia) Oleg Barinov
- Manager: (Russia) Vadim Novgorodtsev
- Coach: (Switzerland) Angelo Schirinzi (Russia) Alexander Elizarov (Russia) Vladimir Gavrilov (Russia) Alexey Ivanov (Belarus) Gennady Tumilovich
- Website: http://bsc-kristall.ru/
Home colours
Away colours

Medal record

Beach soccer

Representing Russia

Euro Winners Cup
| Gold medal – first place | 2014 Catania | |
| Gold medal – first place | 2015 Catania | |
| Gold medal – first place | 2020 Nazaré | |
| Gold medal – first place | 2021 Nazaré | |
| Silver medal – second place | 2018 Nazaré | |

Nazaré Cup
| Gold medal – first place | 2018 Nazaré | |

Russian Championships
| Gold medal – first place | 2013 Moscow | |
| Gold medal – first place | 2015 Sochi | |
| Gold medal – first place | 2016 St. Petersburg | |
| Gold medal – first place | 2018 Moscow | |
| Gold medal – first place | 2019 Samara | |
| Gold medal – first place | 2021 Moscow | |
| Gold medal – first place | 2022 St. Petersburg | |
| Silver medal – second place | 2012 St. Petersburg | |
| Silver medal – second place | 2014 Volgograd | |
| Silver medal – second place | 2017 Saratov | |

Russian Cup
| Gold medal – first place | 2015 Sochi | |
| Gold medal – first place | 2017 Samara | |
| Gold medal – first place | 2018 Sochi | |
| Gold medal – first place | 2019 Sochi | |
| Gold medal – first place | 2020 Moscow | |
| Bronze medal – third place | 2012 Moscow | |
| Bronze medal – third place | 2016 Sochi | |

Russian Super Cup
| Gold medal – first place | 2018 Moscow | |

Inter Cup
| Gold medal – first place | 2017 St. Petersburg | |
| Gold medal – first place | 2018 St. Petersburg | |
| Silver medal – second place | 2019 St. Petersburg | |
| Silver medal – second place | 2020 St. Petersburg | |

Open Indoor Beach Soccer League
| Gold medal – first place | 2015 St. Petersburg | |

St. Petersburg Championships
| Gold medal – first place | 2018 St. Petersburg | |
| Gold medal – first place | 2019 St. Petersburg | |

St. Petersburg Indoor Championships
| Gold medal – first place | 2017 St. Petersburg | |
| Gold medal – first place | 2018 St. Petersburg | |
| Bronze medal – third place | 2016 St. Petersburg | |

BSC Kristall (Russian: ПФК «Кристалл»), or simply Kristall, is a professional beach soccer team based in St. Petersburg, Russia. Kristall is the most successful Russian club at the Euro Winners Cup, having won four times in 2014, 2015, 2020 and 2021. Kristall are a seven-time Russian Nationals and a five-time Russian Beach Soccer Cup champions. Additionally, the team won the 2nd Russian Super Cup in 2018, defeating arch-rival BSC Lokomotiv.

The club's Brazilian forward, Mauricinho, has described Kristall as the "Real Madrid of beach soccer".

== History ==
Kristall was founded in 2006. Since 2011, Kristall plays in the national elite division. In 2011, Kristall won their first tournament, OBSL Grand-Prix Winter, and a year later they joined the holding company NOVA Group. They reached their zenit in 2015, after winning every tournament they participated, among them the Euro Winners Cup, the Russian Nationals and the inaugural Russian Cup. In 2021, they won a record 6th Russian Nationals and a record 4th Euro Winners Cup.

== Squads ==
=== Current squad ===
Note: Flags indicate national team as defined under FIFA eligibility rules; some limited exceptions apply. Players may hold more than one non-FIFA nationality.

| No. | Pos. | Nation | Player |
|---|---|---|---|
| 1 | GK | RUS | Ivan Ostrovsky |
| 3 | FW | RUS | Aleksey Ilyinsky |
| 4 | FW | RUS | Aleksey Makarov |
| 5 | FW | RUS | Yury Krasheninnikov |
| 6 | FW | RUS | Dmitry Shishin |
| 7 | FW | RUS | Dmitry Kartashov |
| 8 | FW | BLR | Igor Brishtel |
| 9 | FW | BRA | Rodrigo |
| 10 | FW | BRA | Datinha |
| 14 | FW | RUS | Artur Paporotnyi |
| 15 | FW | RUS | Kirill Romanov (captain) |

| No. | Pos. | Nation | Player |
|---|---|---|---|
| 18 | FW | RUS | Vladislav Zharikov |
| 20 | FW | RUS | Mikhail Samusevich |
| 21 | GK | RUS | Maxim Chuzhkov |
| 23 | FW | RUS | Igor Remizov |
| 27 | FW | RUS | Roman Gurdzhiyan |
| 31 | GK | RUS | Daniel Tumilovich |
| 33 | FW | BRA | Mauricinho |
| 71 | FW | RUS | Aleksandr Revenko |
| 77 | GK | RUS | Aleksandr Besedin |
| 88 | FW | RUS | Aleksey Krasnoshchekov |
| 92 | FW | RUS | Dmitry Frolov |
| 16 | GK | RUS | Artem Pechnikov |

Head coach: (Switzerland) Angelo Schirinzi
1st coach: (Russia) Vladimir Gavrilov
2nd coach: (Russia) Aleksey Ivanov
3rd coach: (Belarus) Gennadyi Tumilovich

== Honours ==
=== International competitions ===
- Euro Winners Cup

- Winners (4): 2014, 2015, 2020, 2021

- Euro Winners Challenge

- Winners (1): 2018

- Open Indoor Beach Soccer League

- Winners (1): 2015

- Inter Cup

- Winners (3): 2017, 2018, 2023

=== National competitions ===
- Russian Beach Soccer League

- Winners (10): 2013, 2015, 2016, 2018, 2019, 2021, 2022, 2023, 2024, 2025

- Russian Cup

- Winners (8): 2015, 2017, 2018, 2019, 2020, 2021, 2022, 2023, 2025

- Russian Super Cup

- Winners (2): 2018, 2024, 2025, 2026

== Notable former players ==
- (Brazil) Elinton Andrade
- (Brazil) Jorginho
- (Brazil) Mauricinho
- (Brazil) Rodrigo
- (Brazil) Datinha
- (Belarus) Ihar Bryshtel
- (Russia) Maxim Chuzhkov
- (Russia) Aleksey Makarov
- (Russia) Dmitry Shishin
- (Spain) Llorenç
