= Lucao =

Lucão is a Portuguese-language nickname for Lucas and may refer to:

== People ==
- Lucão (volleyball), Brazilian volleyball player Lucas Saatkamp (born 1986)
- Lucão (footballer, born 1990), Brazilian football centre-back Lucas Galdino de Paiva
- Lucão (footballer, born 1991), Brazilian football forward Lucas Vinicius Gonçalves Silva
- Lucão (footballer, born 1992), Brazilian football defender Lucas Alves de Araujo
- Lucão (footballer, born 1993), Brazilian football defender Lucas Gama Moreira
- Lucão (footballer, born 1995), Brazilian football forward Lucas Marcos Meireles
- Lucão (footballer, born 1996), Brazilian football centre-back Lucas Cavalcante Silva Afonso
- Lucão (footballer, born 2000), Brazilian football forward Lucas Gabriel Ribeiro Firmo
- Lucão (footballer, born 2001), Brazilian football goalkeeper Lucas Alexandre Galdino de Azevedo
- Lucão (footballer, born 2002), Brazilian football defender Lucas Gabriel Da Silva Teodoro

== Places ==
- Lucao, Chiayi, Taiwan, a rural township
- Lucao, a barangay of Dagupan, Philippines
