= Dmitry Shishin =

Russian beach soccer player

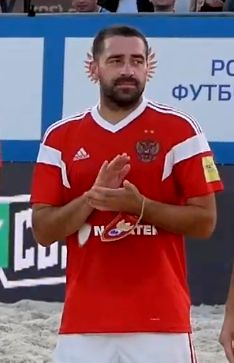

Personal information
- Full name: Dmitry Vladimirovich Shishin
- Date of birth: 14 March 1986 (age 40)
- Place of birth: Saratov, Soviet Union
- Position: Forward

Team information
- Current team: Kristall

Youth career
- 1993–2006: Sokol Saratov (football)

Senior career*
| Years | Team | Apps | (Gls) |
| 2006 | Biznes-Pravo (beach soccer) | 4 | (6) |
| 2007–2008 | Sputnik (beach soccer) | 7 | (5) |
| 2008 | Rosagro (beach soccer) | 3 | (7) |
| 2009 | Biznes-Pravo (beach soccer) | 7 | (12) |
| 2010 | Delta (beach soccer) | 11 | (6) |
| 2011–2012 | Lokomotiv Moscow (beach soccer) | 39 | (32) |
| 2013–2014 | Rotor Volgograd (beach soccer) | 104 | (126) |
| 2015– | Kristall (beach soccer) | 254 | (185) |

International career^{‡}
| 2007– | Russia (beach soccer) | 230 | (235) |
- * Club domestic league appearances and goals as of 20:21, 13 July 2021 (UTC) ‡ National team caps and goals as of 20:21, 13 July 2021 (UTC)

Medal record

Beach soccer

Representing Russia

FIFA Beach Soccer World Cup
| Gold medal – first place | 2011 Ravenna | |
| Gold medal – first place | 2013 Papeete | |
| Gold medal – first place | 2021 Moscow | |
| Bronze medal – third place | 2015 Espinho | |
| Bronze medal – third place | 2019 Luque | |

Beach Soccer Intercontinental Cup
| Gold medal – first place | 2011 Dubai | |
| Gold medal – first place | 2012 Dubai | |
| Gold medal – first place | 2015 Dubai | |
| Silver medal – second place | 2013 Dubai | |
| Silver medal – second place | 2014 Dubai | |

European Games
| Gold medal – first place | 2015 Baku | Team |

Euro Beach Soccer Cup
| Gold medal – first place | 2010 Rome | |
| Gold medal – first place | 2012 Moscow | |

Dmitry Vladimirovich Shishin (Russian: Дмитрий Владимирович Шишин; born 14 March 1986) is a Russian beach soccer player currently active as forward, playing for the Russia national beach soccer team and BSC Kristall. Shishin is Merited Master of Sports of Russia.

== Career ==
Dmitry's father Vladimir brought him to football at age seven, his first coach being Alexey Tarasov. He began his career in Sokol Saratov, then he played futsal until 2006, when he discovered beach soccer. In 2007, members of the Russian Football Union discovered the talented Shishin at the tournament "Golden Sands of Samara", and invited him to the Russia national beach soccer team. That year Shishin participated at the Russian Championship as player of Samarian Sputnik and debuted for the national team at the Beach Soccer World Cup.

After Sputnik, Shishin for a long time played for different Saratov clubs, such as Rosagro, Biznes-Pravo, Delta. In 2011, Shishin moved to Lokomotiv Moscow, where he won the championship trophy with his team. Together with the Lokomotives he won another national championship trophy and two Russian cups. In 2013, Shishin switched to Rotor Volgograd, who became runners-up of the 2013 Championships, losing there to Kristall, as well as winners of the 2014 Championships and the 2014 Russian Cup. In the two years Shishin scored 66 goals in 43 caps.

Shishin is one of the top players for the national team. He is the top scorer for the Russian national team. He was numerous times MVP player and best forward player. At the 2013 FIFA Beach Soccer World Cup, he scored the fifth and last goal against Spain, and with 11 goals became best goalscorer.

On 21 December 2012, Shishin was named Merited Master of Sports by the order of the Sports Minister.

== Achievements ==
=== National team ===
- FIFA Beach Soccer World Cup champion: 2011, 2013, 2021
- Euro Beach Soccer Cup champion: 2010, 2012
- Euro Beach Soccer League champion: 2009, 2011, 2017

=== Clubs ===
- Russian National champion: 2008, 2009, 2010, 2011, 2012, 2014, 2015, 2016, 2018, 2019, 2021
- Russian Cup champion: 2008, 2009, 2011, 2012, 2013, 2014, 2015
- Russian Super Cup: 2011, 2018

=== Individually ===
- 2011 season
  - Euro Beach Soccer League, Stage 2 – MVP
  - Euro Beach Soccer League, Stage 2 – Top Scorer
- 2012 season
  - Euro Beach Soccer League, Stage 2 – MVP
  - Euro Beach Soccer League, Stage 2 – Top Scorer
  - Merited Master of Sports (21 December 2012)
- 2018 season
  - Euro Beach Soccer League, Stage 3 – Best Player
