= Cadiz CF Sotelo =

Cádiz CF Playa Victoria
- Full name: Cádiz Club de Fútbol Playa Victoria
- Nickname: Limoneros
- Founded: 2010
- President: Manuel Vizcaíno
- Head coach: Juan Carlos Martin Figuereo
- League: Liga Nacional de Fútbol Playa
Home colours
Away colours

Cádiz Club de Fútbol Playa Victoria is a professional beach soccer team based in Cádiz, Andalusia, Spain. It is a part of the Cádiz CF.

== 2017 Men's Euro Winners Cup squad ==
Note: Flags indicate national team as defined under FIFA eligibility rules; some limited exceptions apply. Players may hold more than one non-FIFA nationality.

No.	Pos.	Nation	Player
1	GK	ESP	Cristian Méndez
3	DF	ESP	Alejandro del Amor Camacho
4	DF	ESP	Cristian Torres Medina
5	DF	ESP	Juan Manuel Martin
6	FW	ESP	Daniel Pajón Gómez
7	FW	ESP	Ezequiel Carrera Tracisto

No.	Pos.	Nation	Player
8	FW	ESP	Francisco Javier Sotelo Baro (captain)
9	FW	ESP	Javier Torres Medina
10	DF	ESP	Francisco Mejias Noya
11	MF	ESP	Venildo Neto Paraiba
13	GK	ESP	Jairo Ruiz Garrido

Coach: (Spain) Juan Carlos Martin Figuereo

== Honours ==
=== National competitions ===
- V Campeonato Nacional de Futbol Playa

- Winners:
  - 2016
