= BSC Lokomotiv Moscow =

- Full name: BSC Lokomotiv Moscow
- Nicknames: Loko; Parovozy (Steam Locomotives); Krasno-zelyonyye (Red-Greens)
- Founded: 2010
- Owner: (Russia) Russian Railways
- Chairman: (Russia) Vitaly Pogodin
- Coach: (Russia) Alekandr Elizarov
- Website: http://pfkloko.ru
Home colours
Away colours

Medal record

Beach soccer

Representing Russia

Mundialito de Clubes
Gold medal – first place	2012 São Paulo	
Gold medal – first place	2017 São Paulo	
Bronze medal – third place	2020 Moscow	

Euro Winners Cup
Gold medal – first place	2013 San Benedetto del Tronto	
Bronze medal – third place	2017 Nazaré	

Euro Winners Challenge
Gold medal – first place	2019 Nazaré	

Alanya Cup
Gold medal – first place	2018 Alanya	

Eurasia Cup
Gold medal – first place	2018 Yazd	
Silver medal – second place	2017 Yazd	

Russian Championships
Gold medal – first place	2010 Anapa	
Gold medal – first place	2011 St. Petersburg	
Gold medal – first place	2012 St. Petersburg	
Gold medal – first place	2017 Saratov	
Bronze medal – third place	2013 Moscow	
Bronze medal – third place	2015 Sochi	
Bronze medal – third place	2016 St. Petersburg	
Bronze medal – third place	2021 Moscow	

Russian Cup
Gold medal – first place	2011 Anapa	
Gold medal – first place	2012 Moscow	
Gold medal – first place	2013 St. Petersburg	
Gold medal – first place	2016 Sochi	
Silver medal – second place	2014 Anapa	
Silver medal – second place	2018 Sochi	

Russian Super Cup
Gold medal – first place	2011	
Silver medal – second place	2018 Moscow	

Two Capitals Cup
Bronze medal – third place	2016 Moscow & St. Petersburg	

Victory Cup
Gold medal – first place	2017 Moscow	
Gold medal – first place	2019 Korolev	

Moscow Championships
Silver medal – second place	2018 Moscow	

BSC Lokomotiv Moscow (Russian: ПФК «Локомотив» Москва) is a professional beach soccer team associated with the soccer club FC Lokomotiv Moscow based in Moscow, Russia. Lokomotiv Moscow is a four-times Russian champion, four-times Russian Cup winner and the first holder of the Russian Super Cup in 2011. Internationally, Lokomotiv is the only Russian club to win the Mundialito de Clubes. The club won the inaugural 2013 Euro Winners Cup.

== Current squad ==
Note: Flags indicate national team as defined under FIFA eligibility rules; some limited exceptions apply. Players may hold more than one non-FIFA nationality.

No.	Pos.	Nation	Player
1	GK	RUS	Mikhail Avgustov
2	FW	RUS	Nuritdin Mamadiev
3	FW	RUS	Yan Peletskiy
5	FW	RUS	Boris Nikonorov (captain)
8	FW	RUS	Artem Voloshin
9	FW	BRA	Lucao

No.	Pos.	Nation	Player
10	FW	ESP	Llorenç Gomez León
11	FW	RUS	Ostap Fedorov
17	FW	RUS	Dmitry Samokhvalov
18	FW	RUS	Nikita Safronov
21	GK	IRN	Hamid Behzadpour
22	FW	IRN	Amir Hosein Akbari Fartkhouni

Coach: (Russia) Alekandr Elizarov

== Honours ==
=== International competitions ===
- Mundialito de Clubes

- Winners (3): 2012, 2017, 2021

- Euro Winners Cup

- Winners (1): 2013

- Euro Winners Challenge

- Winners (1): 2019

- Alanya Cup

- Winners (1): 2018

- Eurasia Cup

- Winners (1): 2018

=== National competitions ===
- Russian Championships

- Winners (5): 2010, 2011, 2012, 2017, 2020

- Russian Cup

- Winners (4): 2011, 2012, 2013, 2016

- Russian Super Cup

- Winners (1): 2011

- Two Capitals Cup

- Third place (1): 2016

- Victory Cup

- Winners (2): 2017, 2019

- Moscow Championships

- Runners-up (1): 2018

== Notable former players ==
- (Brazil) Ozu Moreira
- (Iran) Ahmadzadeh
- (Portugal) Belchior
- (Portugal) Alan Cavalcanti
- (Portugal) Madjer
- (Romania) Maci
- (Russia) Bukhlitskiy
- (Russia) Chuzhkov
- (Russia) Filimonov
- (Russia) Krasheninnikov
- (Russia) Leonov
- (Russia) Makarov
- (Russia) Shkarin
- (Russia) Shishin
- (Russia) Shaykov
- (Switzerland) Stankovic
