= BSC Spartak Moscow =

- Full name: BSC Spartak Moscow
- Nickname: Myaso (Meat)
- Founded: 2012
- Coach: (Russia) Dmitry Nezhelev
- Website: http://www.bsc-spartak.ru
Home colours
Away colours

Medal record

Beach soccer

Representing Russia

Mundialito de Clubes
| Silver medal – second place | 2020 Moscow | |

Russian Championships
| Silver medal – second place | 2019 Samara | |
| Silver medal – second place | 2020 St. Petersburg | |
| Bronze medal – third place | 2018 Moscow | |

Russian Cup
| Silver medal – second place | 2019 Sochi | |

Two Capitals Cup
| Silver medal – second place | 2016 Moscow/St. Petersburg | |

Victory Cup
| Silver medal – second place | 2017 Moscow | |

Moscow Championships
| Gold medal – first place | 2018 Moscow | |
| Silver medal – second place | 2017 Moscow | |

Moscow Winter (Indoor) Championships
| Gold medal – first place | 2017 Moscow | |
| Silver medal – second place | 2018 Moscow | |

St. Petersburg Championships
| Gold medal – first place | 2016 St. Petersburg | |

Anokhin Cup
| Gold medal – first place | 2017 Moscow Oblast | |

BSC Lokomotiv Cup
| Gold medal – first place | 2020 Moscow | |

BSC Spartak Moscow (Russian: ПФК «Спартак» Москва) is a professional beach soccer team associated with the soccer club FC Spartak Moscow based in Moscow, Russia. Their best result to date internationally was reaching the final of the 2020 Mundialito de Clubes.

== Current squad ==
Note: Flags indicate national team as defined under FIFA eligibility rules; some limited exceptions apply. Players may hold more than one non-FIFA nationality.

| No. | Pos. | Nation | Player |
|---|---|---|---|
| 1 | GK | RUS | Denis Parkhomenko |
| 2 | MF | RUS | Yuri Kotov |
| 3 | DF | RUS | Andrey Novikov |
| 4 | MF | RUS | Alexey Makarov |
| 5 | FW | BLR | Aleh Hapon |
| 6 | DF | RUS | Alexey Pavlenko (captain) |
| 7 | DF | RUS | Anton Shkarin |
| 8 | MF | BRA | Jordan |

| No. | Pos. | Nation | Player |
|---|---|---|---|
| 10 | MF | BRA | Paulinho |
| 11 | FW | IRI | Mohammad Ahmadzade |
| 15 | DF | RUS | Vladimir Raskin |
| 17 | MF | RUS | Maxim Egorov |
| 19 | DF | BLR | Mikita Chaikouski |
| 20 | FW | RUS | Fedor Zemskov |
| 32 | FW | RUS | Valery Balandin |

Head coach: (Russia) Dmitry Nezhelev

== Notable former players ==
- (Brazil) Bruno Xavier da Silva

== Kit ==
Since 2022, the Russian sportswear manufacturer ALTERNATIVA has served as the kit supplier for BSC Spartak Moscow.

BSC Spartak Moscow 2022 kit by ALTERNATIVA at MIBSC 2022

BSC Spartak Moscow 2022 kit by ALTERNATIVA at MIBSC 2022

BSC Spartak Moscow 2023 season kit by ALTERNATIVA

BSC Spartak Moscow 2023 season kit by ALTERNATIVA

BSC Spartak Moscow 2023 season kit by ALTERNATIVA

BSC Spartak Moscow 2023 season kit by ALTERNATIVA

BSC Spartak Moscow 2024 season kit by ALTERNATIVA

BSC Spartak Moscow 2024 season kit by ALTERNATIVA

BSC Spartak Moscow 2024 season kit by ALTERNATIVA
