= 2011 Euro Beach Soccer League =

2011 Euro Beach Soccer Leagfue
Tournament details
- Teams: 20 (from 1 confederation)
- Venues: 5 (in 5 host cities)

Final positions
- Champions: Russia (2nd title)
- Runners-up: Switzerland
- Third place: Portugal
- Fourth place: Romania

Tournament statistics
- Matches played: 54
- Goals scored: 412 (7.63 per match)

The 2011 Euro Beach Soccer League (EBSL) is an annual European competition in beach soccer. The competitions allows national teams to compete in beach soccer in a league format over the summer months. Each season ends with a Superfinal, deciding the competition winner.

There are seven teams participating in two divisions in each Stage (there are four Stages) that will face each other in a round-robin system. Division A consists of the 8 top teams in Europe based on the BSWW European Ranking. Division B consists of the lower ranked teams and new entries to the competition. Each division has its own regulations and competition format.

Each team competes in two preliminary events to see their points obtained accumulated into an overall ranking that will determine the teams that qualify for the Superfinal. The top five teams of Division A (including the individual Stage winners) plus the host team Russia play in the Superfinal in Moscow (Russia) from August 26–29. The top five teams of Division B (including the individual Stage winners) plus the worst team in Division A will play in the Promotional Final to try to earn promotion to Division A for the 2012 season.

== Teams ==
2011 Euro Beach Soccer League Divisions
DIVISION A		DIVISION B		
Italy	Russia	Andorra	England	Israel
Poland	Spain	Azerbaijan	France	Netherlands
Portugal	Switzerland	Belarus	Germany	Norway
Romania	Turkey	Czech Republic	Greece	Ukraine

== Stage 1 Bern, Switzerland – May, 27 – 29 ==
=== Participating nations ===
- Switzerland
- Spain
- Italy
- Turkey
- Norway
- Israel
- Ukraine

It had been earlier announced that Hungary would be the third team participating in Division B.

=== Final standings Division A ===
Team	Pld	W	W+	L	GF	GA	+/-	Pts
Spain	3	3	0	0	14	10	+4	9
Italy	3	2	0	1	16	10	+6	6
Switzerland	3	1	0	2	11	13	−2	3
Turkey	3	0	0	3	11	19	−8	0

clinched Superfinal Berth

=== Final standings Division B ===
Team	Pld	W	W+	L	GF	GA	+/-	Pts
Israel	2	2	0	0	11	5	+6	6
Ukraine	2	1	0	1	5	7	−2	3
Norway	2	0	0	2	5	9	−4	0

clinched Promotional Final Berth

=== Schedule and results ===
All kickoff times are of local time in Bern (UTC+02:00).

27 May 2011
14:30

Israel	6 – 3	Norway
Norway (O.G.) 13'; T. Iloz 14', 20', 24'; A. Yatim 22', 35'	Report	T.-R. Sorensen 1', 13'; H. Salveson 19'

Freibad Weyermannshaus, Bern
27 May 2011
15:45

Spain	5 – 3	Italy
A. Aceitón 10'; C. Torres 14'; J. Lima 23'; Kuman 32'; Nico 33'	Report	S. Feudi 17'; D. Ramacciotti 18'; P. Palmacci 33'

Freibad Weyermannshaus, Bern
27 May 2011
17:00

Switzerland	6 – 4	Turkey
S. Spaccarotella 2', 36'; D. Stankovic 4'; M. Rodrigues 23'; S. Meier 24'; K. Jaeggy 29'	Report	Tamer Ay 4'; E. Eriten 14'; I. Kerem 21', 21'

Freibad Weyermannshaus, Bern

28 May 2011
14:30

Norway	2 – 3	Ukraine
T.-R. Sorensen 5'; H. Salveson 11'	Report	A. Yevdokymov 14', 26'; Y. Loskutov 29'

Freibad Weyermannshaus, Bern
28 May 2011
15:45

Italy	9 – 4	Turkey
M. Leghissa 7', 32'; S. Di Maio 13'; P. Palmacci 15'; S. Feudi 28'; D. Ramacciotti 30'; G. Soria 31', 36'; Y. Ergun (O.G.) 35'	Report	I. Kerem 6'; A. Muftuoglu 7'; E. Eriten 24', 29'

Freibad Weyermannshaus, Bern
28 May 2011
17:00

Switzerland	4 – 5	Spain
M. Rodrigues 11'; D. Stankovic 21', 22', 35'	Report	C. Torres 1'; P. Gomez 21'; N. Rodriguez 30', 31'; J. Lima 32'

Freibad Weyermannshaus, Bern

29 May 2011
14:30

Israel	5 – 2	Ukraine
A. Levi 2'; M. Amar 9'; A. Yatim 17', 35'; T. Iloz 33'	Report	Riabchuk 6'; O. Andrieiev 8'

Freibad Weyermannshaus, Bern
29 May 2011
15:45

Spain	4 – 3	Turkey
N. Rodriguez 10'; A. Aceitón 18'; J. Lima 18'; M. Beiro 21'	Report	A. Sezer 17', 32'; E. Eriten 22'

Freibad Weyermannshaus, Bern
29 May 2011
17:00

Italy	4 – 1	Switzerland
G. Soria 9', 34', 36'; M. Leghissa 9'	Report	A. Schirinzi 13'

Freibad Weyermannshaus, Bern

=== Individual awards ===
MVP: Juanma Lima (Spain)
Top Scorer: Giuseppe Soria (Italy) — 5 goals
Best goalkeeper: Simone Del Mestre (Italy)

== Stage 2 Berlin, Germany – July, 8 – 10 ==
=== Participating nations ===
- Portugal
- Romania
- Russia
- Turkey
- Germany
- Czech Republic
- Andorra

=== Final standings Division A ===
Team	Pld	W	W+	L	GF	GA	+/-	Pts
Russia	3	3	0	0	18	8	+10	9
Portugal	3	2	0	1	15	13	+2	6
Romania	3	1	0	2	11	14	−3	3
Turkey	3	0	0	3	9	18	−9	0

clinched Superfinal Berth

=== Final standings Division B ===
Team	Pld	W	W+	L	GF	GA	+/-	Pts
Czech Republic	2	2	0	0	10	5	+5	6
Germany	2	1	0	1	6	7	−1	3
Andorra	2	0	0	2	4	8	−4	0

clinched Promotional Final Berth

=== Schedule and results ===
All kickoff times are of local time in Berlin (UTC+02:00).

8 July 2011
16:45

Russia	5 – 2	Romania
I. Leonov 9'; D. Shishin 15', 36'; E. Eremeev 24', 31'	Report	Maci 24', 26'

O2 World, Berlin
8 July 2011
18:00

Turkey	3 – 6	Portugal
Tamer Ay 13'; I. Kerem 17', 26'	Report	N. Belchior 4', 20', 20', 30'; M. Duarte 10'; R. Coimbra 28'

O2 World, Berlin
8 July 2011
19:30

Germany	4 – 1	Andorra
M. dos Santos 6', 30'; S. Ullrich 21'; T. Heger 26'	Report	S. Moreno 21'

O2 World, Berlin

9 July 2011
15:30

Czech Republic	4 – 3	Andorra
M. Lukič 14'; J. Kovařík 22'; T. Peteřik 24', 33'	Report	D. Codina 8'; J. Ayala 11'; E. Flinch 29'

O2 World, Berlin
9 July 2011
16:45

Portugal	5 – 4	Romania
N. Belchior 2', 13'; Madjer 30'; Durval 34'; B. Novo 35'	Report	A. Tănase 9'; Maci 20'; Boata 29'; L. Croituru 36'

O2 World, Berlin
9 July 2011
18:00

Russia	7 – 2	Turkey
A. Makarov 9', 35'; E. Eremeev 9'; E. Shaykov 14'; D. Shishin 16'; A. Paporotnyi 24'; I. Leonov 34'	Report	A. Sezer 24'; O. Zayim 36'

O2 World, Berlin

10 July 2011
16:30

Portugal	4 – 6	Russia
R. Coimbra 18', 22'; B. Novo 24'; Madjer 28'	Report	Y. Krashenninikov 11'; E. Eremeev 27'; D. Shishin 28', 30', 34', 36'

O2 World, Berlin
10 July 2011
17:45

Romania	5 – 4	Turkey
L. Croituru 13'; Boata 15'; Maci 16', 28'; I. Posteucă 27'	Report	A. Sezer 2'; Tamer Ay 13'; E. Eriten 19', 27'

O2 World, Berlin
10 July 2011
19:45

Germany	2 – 6	Czech Republic
D. Neumann 9'; S. Ullrich 18'	Report	M. Boček 7'; T. Peteřik 14'; J. Kovařík 17', 36'; J. Mižár 32'; M. Lukič 35'

O2 World, Berlin

=== Individual awards ===
MVP: Dmitry Shishin ( (Russia) )
Top Scorer: Dmitry Shishin ( (Russia) ) — 7 goals
Best goalkeeper: Andrey Bukhlitskiy ( (Russia) )

== Stage 3 Ravenna, Italy – July, 22 – 24 ==
=== Participating nations ===
- Italy
- Poland
- Romania
- Switzerland
- Azerbaijan
- Belarus
- France

=== Final standings Division A ===
Team	Pld	W	W+	L	GF	GA	+/-	Pts
Switzerland	3	3	0	0	18	10	+8	9
Romania	3	2	0	1	13	14	−1	6
Italy	3	1	0	2	4	8	−4	3
Poland	3	0	0	3	10	13	−3	0

clinched Superfinal Berth

=== Final standings Division B ===
Team	Pld	W	W+	L	GF	GA	+/-	Pts
France	2	1	1	0	5	3	+2	5
Belarus	2	1	0	1	7	2	+5	3
Azerbaijan	2	0	0	2	3	10	−7	0

clinched Promotional Final Berth

=== Schedule and results ===
All kickoff times are of local time in Ravenna (UTC+02:00).

22 July 2011
15:30

France	1 – 1 (a.e.t.)	Belarus
D. Samoun 18'	Report	E. Haiduk 16'
Penalties
S. François (penalty scored)	1 – 0	(penalty missed) I. Miranovich

Marina di Ravenna
22 July 2011
16:45

Switzerland	9 – 4	Romania
S. Leu 5', 12', 36'; D. Stankovic 18', 27'; A. Schirinzi 19'; S. Meier 21'; S. Spaccarotella 32'; M. Rodrigues 33'	Report	M. Posteucă 13'; Maci 21', 34'; A. Tănase 23'

Marina di Ravenna
22 July 2011
18:00

Poland	1 – 2	Italy
M. Olejniczak 15'	Report	G. Soria 8'; P. Palmacci 36'

Marina di Ravenna

23 July 2011
15:30

Azerbaijan	1 – 6	Belarus
E. Huseynov 31'	Report	I. Bryshtsel 5', 29'; A. Bogaichuk 7'; E. Haiduk 25'; I. Miranovich 33'; V. Krupitsa 35'

Marina di Ravenna
23 July 2011
16:45

Switzerland	7 – 6	Poland
D. Stankovic 3', 9', 31'; S. Spaccarotella 12'; M. Jaeggy 30', 36'; M. Rodrigues 31'	Report	B. Saganowski 10', 12', 14', 21'; W. Ziober 17'; M. Widzicki 34'

Marina di Ravenna
23 July 2011
18:00

Italy	2 – 5	Romania
M. Leghissa 30'; S. Feudi 35'	Report	M. Posteucă 20'; Maci 23', 28'; I. Posteucă 29'; Luci 31'

Marina di Ravenna

24 July 2011
15:30

France	4 – 2	Azerbaijan
J. Basquaise 4'; J.-M. Edouard 18', 36'; J. Soares 23'	Report	Elvin Guliyev 16', 36'

Marina di Ravenna
24 July 2011
16:45

Romania	4 – 3	Poland
M. Posteucă 25', 30'; A. Tănase 29'; L. Croituru 36'	Report	B. Saganowski 7'; D. Golebiowski 11', 12'

Marina di Ravenna
24 July 2011
18:00

Italy	0 – 2	Switzerland
	Report	M. Rodrigues 22'; S. Leu 32'

Marina di Ravenna

=== Individual awards ===
MVP: Maci ( (Romania) )
Top Scorer: Boguslaw Saganowski ( (Poland) ) and Dejan Stankovic ( (Switzerland) ) — 5 goals
Best goalkeeper: Simone Del Mestre ( (Italy) )

== Stage 4 Den Haag (The Hague), Netherlands – July, 29 – 31 ==
=== Participating nations ===
- Poland
- Portugal
- Russia
- Spain
- England
- Greece
- Netherlands

=== Final standings Division A ===
Team	Pld	W	W+	L	GF	GA	+/-	Pts
Portugal	3	2	0	1	13	11	+2	6
Russia	3	2	0	1	18	9	+9	6
Poland	3	1	0	2	11	14	−3	3
Spain	3	1	0	2	8	16	−8	3

clinched previous Superfinal Berth	clinched Superfinal Berth

=== Final standings Division B ===
Team	Pld	W	W+	L	GF	GA	+/-	Pts
Netherlands	2	2	0	0	11	5	+6	6
Greece	2	1	0	1	7	6	+1	3
England	2	0	0	2	5	12	−7	0

clinched Promotional Final Berth

=== Schedule and results ===
All kickoff times are of local time in The Hague (UTC+02:00).

29 July 2011
15:45

Poland	5 – 6	Portugal
B. Saganowski 12', 30'; W. Ziober 22'; M. Gorecki 24'; L. Stasiak 26'	Report	Madjer 2', 20'; N. Belchior 17', 25', 26'; Bruno 25'

Scheveningen Beach Stadion, The Hague
29 July 2011
17:00

Russia	9 – 3	Spain
Y. Krashenninikov 11'; D. Shishin 12', 23'; A. Shkarin 14', 26'; I. Leonov 20'; E. Eremeev 32', 36'; E. Shaykov 34'	Report	A. Aceitón 11'; J. Lopez 20'; Nico 26'

Scheveningen Beach Stadion, The Hague
29 July 2011
18:15

England	2 – 5	Greece
S. Black 27'; G. Funnell 28'	Report	T. Triantafillidis 6', 25'; P. Konstantinopoulos 25'; K. Kavalaris 33'; S. Komiotis 33'

Scheveningen Beach Stadion, The Hague

30 July 2011
15:45

Netherlands	4 – 2	Greece
A. Van Geldermalsen 5', 31'; L. Koswal 7'; P. Ax 14'	Report	K. Kavalaris 12'; J. Charalampidis 26'

Scheveningen Beach Stadion, The Hague
30 July 2011
17:00

Russia	6 – 1	Poland
E. Shaykov 3', 16' , 33'; Y. Krashenninikov 5'; A. Shkarin 8'; D. Shishin 19'	Report	M. Gorecki 4'

Scheveningen Beach Stadion, The Hague
30 July 2011
18:15

Portugal	2 – 3	Spain
N. Belchior 7'; P. Graça 35'	Report	Nico 13'; J. Lima 14'; J. Lopez 31'

Scheveningen Beach Stadion, The Hague

31 July 2011
17:00

Netherlands	7 – 3	England
A. Van Geldermalsen 12'; P. Ax 22', 32'; L. Koswal 26'; P. Tosch 30'; A. Ajiach 32'; E. Van Rooijen 35'	Report	G. Funnell 1', 16'; M. Day 5'

Scheveningen Beach Stadion, The Hague
31 July 2011
18:15

Spain	2 – 5	Poland
R. Merida 22'; J. Lopez 27'	Report	B. Saganowski 11', 16', 19'; D. Golebiowski 29'; L. Stasiuk 33'

Scheveningen Beach Stadion, The Hague
31 July 2011
19:30

Portugal	5 – 3	Russia
Madjer 5'; N. Belchior 17', 29'; Lucio 20'; L. Vaz 24'	Report	E. Shaykov 8'; Y. Krashenninikov 15'; Shakmelyan 24'

Scheveningen Beach Stadion, The Hague

=== Individual awards ===
MVP: Egor Shaykov ( (Russia) )
Top Scorer: Belchior ( (Portugal) ) — 6 goals
Best goalkeeper: Xan ( (Spain) )

== Cumulative standings ==
clinched Superfinal Berth	clinched Promotional Final Berth

=== Division A ===
Pos	Team	Pld	W	W+	L	GF	GA	+/-	Pts
1	Russia	6	5	0	1	36	17	+19	15
2	Switzerland	6	4	0	2	29	23	+6	12
3	Portugal	6	4	0	2	28	24	+4	12
4	Spain	6	4	0	2	22	26	−4	12
5	Italy	6	3	0	3	20	18	+2	9
6	Romania	6	3	0	3	24	28	−4	9
7	Poland	6	1	0	5	21	27	−6	3
8	Turkey	6	0	0	6	20	37	−17	0

=== Division B ===
Pos	Team	Pld	W	W+	L	GF	GA	+/-	Pts
1	Netherlands	2	2	0	0	11	5	+6	6
2	Israel	2	2	0	0	11	5	+6	6
3	Czech Republic	2	2	0	0	10	5	+5	6
4	France	2	1	1	0	5	3	+2	5
5	Belarus	2	1	0	1	7	2	+5	3
6	Greece	2	1	0	1	7	6	+1	3
7	Germany	2	1	0	1	6	7	−1	3
8	Ukraine	2	1	0	1	5	7	−2	3
9	Norway	2	0	0	2	5	9	−4	0
10	Andorra	2	0	0	2	4	8	−4	0
11	England	2	0	0	2	5	12	−7	0
12	Azerbaijan	2	0	0	2	3	10	−7	0

Netherlands are ranked ahead of Israel based on fair play points

== EBSL Superfinal and Promotional Final – Moscow, Russia – August, 4 – 7 ==
=== Superfinal and Promotional Final Divisions ===
The Divisions for the Euro Beach Soccer League Superfinal have been determined. The teams from Division A will compete for the Euro Beach Soccer League title while the teams from Division B will compete for promotion into next year's Division A.

2011 Euro Beach Soccer League Superfinal Divisions
DIVISION A (Superfinal)		DIVISION B (Promotional Final)	
GROUP A	GROUP B	GROUP A	GROUP B
Russia	Switzerland	Turkey	Netherlands
Spain	Portugal	Czech Republic	Israel
Romania	Italy	Belarus	France

=== Division A (Superfinal) ===
==== Group A Standings ====
Team	Pld	W	W+	L	GF	GA	+/-	Pts
Russia	2	2	0	0	12	3	+9	6
Romania	2	1	0	1	4	10	−6	3
Spain	2	0	0	2	4	7	−3	0

clinched Superfinal Group

==== Group B Standings ====
Team	Pld	W	W+	L	GF	GA	+/-	Pts
Switzerland	2	1	0	1	11	9	+2	3
Portugal	2	1	0	1	5	6	−1	3
Italy	2	0	1	1	8	9	−1	2

clinched Superfinal Group

=== Schedule and results ===
All kickoff times are of local time in Moscow (UTC+04:00).

==== Round-Robin ====
4 August 2011
13:30

Switzerland	6 – 7 (a.e.t.)	Italy
M. Jaeggy 8'; D. Stankovic 9'; S. Leu 11'; K. Jaeggy 11'; S. Spaccarotella 17'; S. Meier 29'	Report	S. Spada 3'; G. Soria 6', 30', 39'; P. Palmacci 10'; F. Corosiniti 22', 32'

Victory Park at Poklonnaya Hill, Moscow
4 August 2011
17:15

Russia	8 – 1	Romania
I. Leonov 2'; A. Makarov 3'; E. Eremeev 9', 27'; D. Shishin 16', 34', 36'; A. Shkarin 27'	Report	M. Posteucă 27'

Victory Park at Poklonnaya Hill, Moscow

5 August 2011
16:00

Portugal	3 – 1	Italy
Madjer 1'; N. Belchior 4', 27'	Report	M. Leghissa 29'

Victory Park at Poklonnaya Hill, Moscow
5 August 2011
17:15

Russia	4 – 2	Spain
D. Shishin 6', 36'; J. Lima (O.G.) 13'; A. Makarov 18'	Report	J. Lopez 12', 35'

Victory Park at Poklonnaya Hill, Moscow

6 August 2011
16:00

Switzerland	5 – 2	Portugal
D. Stankovic 6'; M. Rodrigues 7'; S. Leu 14', 30', 35'	Report	Madjer 3'; Alan 21'

Victory Park at Poklonnaya Hill, Moscow
6 August 2011
17:15

Spain	2 – 3	Romania
J. Lopez 10'; J. Lima 16'	Report	Maci 2'; I. Posteucă 20'; J. Lima (O.G.) 34'

Victory Park at Poklonnaya Hill, Moscow

==== Fifth-place Match ====
7 August 2011
12:00

Spain	0 – 5	Italy
	Report	G. Soria 1', 12', 36'; S. Del Mestre 11'; D. Ramaciotti 29'

Victory Park at Poklonnaya Hill, Moscow

==== Third-place Match ====
7 August 2011
16:00

Romania	3 – 3 (a.e.t.)	Portugal
R. Cărăuleanu 5'; L. Croituru 35'; I. Posteucă 39'	Report	N. Belchior 16'; J. Santos 33'; Madjer 38'
Penalties
M. Posteucă (penalty scored); Maci (penalty scored); I. Posteucă (penalty scored); Boata (penalty scored); L. Croituru (penalty missed); A. Tănase (penalty missed); Luci (penalty scored); R. Cărăuleanu (penalty scored); I. Gândac (penalty missed)	6 – 7	(penalty scored) Alan; (penalty scored) N. Belchior; (penalty scored) Madjer; (penalty scored) B. Torres; (penalty missed) Marinho; (penalty missed) J. Santos; (penalty scored) Lucio; (penalty scored) R. Coimbra; (penalty scored) P. Graça

Victory Park at Poklonnaya Hill, Moscow

==== Championship final match ====
7 August 2011
17:15

Russia	6 – 4	Switzerland
A. Makarov 13'; I. Leonov 14'; A. Shkarin 16'; Y. Krasheninnikov 19'; D. Shishin 33', 35'	Report	P. Borer 6'; D. Stankovic 8', 12', 13'

Victory Park at Poklonnaya Hill, Moscow

=== Individual awards ===
MVP: Dejan Stankovic ( (Switzerland) )
Top Scorer: Dmitry Shishin ( (Russia) ) — 7 goals
Best goalkeeper: Valentin Jaeggy ( (Switzerland) )

=== Final Division A Standing ===
Rank	Team
1	Russia (Second EBSL Title)
2	Switzerland
3	Portugal
4	Romania
5	Italy
6	Spain

=== Division B (Promotional Final) ===
==== Group A Standings ====
Team	Pld	W	W+	L	GF	GA	+/-	Pts
Turkey	2	2	0	0	15	3	+12	6
Belarus	2	1	0	1	7	5	+2	3
Czech Republic	2	0	0	2	4	18	−14	0

clinched Promotional Final Group

==== Group B Standings ====
Team	Pld	W	W+	L	GF	GA	+/-	Pts
France	2	2	0	0	8	5	+3	6
Israel	2	1	0	1	8	8	0	3
Netherlands	2	0	0	2	9	12	−3	0

clinched Promotional Final Group

=== Schedule and results ===
All kickoff times are of local time in Moscow (UTC+04:00).

==== Round-Robin ====
4 August 2011
14:45

Turkey	3 – 1	Belarus
B. Terzioglu 22'; Tamer Ay 25', 35'	Report	I. Miranovich 24'

Victory Park at Poklonnaya Hill, Moscow
4 August 2011
16:00

Netherlands	4 – 5	France
P. Ax 5', 21'; W. Van Der Gaauw 21'; L. Koswal 22'	Report	S. François 7', 9'; J. Basquaise 22'; J. Soares 28'; D. Samoun 32'

Victory Park at Poklonnaya Hill, Moscow

5 August 2011
13:30

Israel	1 – 3	France
K. Badash 11'	Report	J. Basquaise 2', 32'; D. Samoun 33'

Victory Park at Poklonnaya Hill, Moscow
5 August 2011
14:45

Czech Republic	2 – 6	Belarus
M. Chalupa 1'; L. Karda 11'	Report	A. Bogaichuk 2', 6'; R. Ilyin 14'; V. Bokach 16', 35'; I. Bryshtsel 16'

Victory Park at Poklonnaya Hill, Moscow

6 August 2011
13:30

Netherlands	5 – 7	Israel
L. Koswal 2'; P. Ax 4', 7', 25'; D. Summerville 34'	Report	A. Nakache 9'; T. Iloz 15', 21'; K. Badash 16'; A. Levi 24'; A. Yatim 27', 36'

Victory Park at Poklonnaya Hill, Moscow
6 August 2011
14:45

Turkey	12 – 2	Czech Republic
Tamer Ay 4', 4', 14', 31'; I. Kerem 7'; A. Muftuoglu 10'; B. Terzioglu 11', 23', 33'; E. Eriten 16', 35'; A. Seyit 25'	Report	L. Karda 21'; T. Robb 30'

Victory Park at Poklonnaya Hill, Moscow

==== Fifth-place Match ====
7 August 2011
10:30

Czech Republic	3 – 3 (a.e.t.)	Netherlands
T. Peteřik 11', 16', 32'	Report	P. Ax 7', 18'; A. Van Geldermalsen 32'
Penalties
M. Chalupa (penalty scored)	1 – 0	(penalty missed) P. Ax

Victory Park at Poklonnaya Hill, Moscow

==== Third-place Match ====
7 August 2011
13:30

Belarus	1 – 1 (a.e.t.)	Israel
I. Bryshtsel 36'	Report	A. Yatim 9'
Penalties
V. Bokach (penalty scored); I. Miranovich (penalty missed)	1 – 2	(penalty scored) A. Yatim; (penalty scored) T. Iloz

Victory Park at Poklonnaya Hill, Moscow

==== Promotional Final Match ====
7 August 2011
14:45

Turkey	3 – 6	France
I. Kerem 4'; B. Terzioglu 20'; Tamer Ay 27'	Report	D. Samoun 6', 20', 25', 35'; M. Pagis 28'; F. Mendy 33'

Victory Park at Poklonnaya Hill, Moscow

=== Final Division B Standing ===
Rank	Team
1	France (promoted to 2012 EBSL Division A)
2	Turkey (relegated to Division B)
3	Israel
4	Belarus
5	Czech Republic
6	Netherlands

== See also ==
- Beach soccer
- Euro Beach Soccer League
