= 2012 Euro Beach Soccer League =

Tournament details
- Teams: 21 (from 1 confederation)
- Venues: 4 (in 4 host cities)

Final positions
- Champions: Switzerland (1st title)
- Runners-up: Russia
- Third place: Italy
- Fourth place: Romania

Tournament statistics
- Matches played: 60
- Goals scored: 521 (8.68 per match)

The 2012 Euro Beach Soccer League (EBSL) is an annual European competition in beach soccer, organised by Beach Soccer Worldwide (BSWW). The competitions allows national teams to compete in beach soccer in a league format over the summer months. Each season ends with a Superfinal, deciding the competition winner.

This season, there are eight teams participating in two divisions in each Stage (there are three Stages this year, as opposed to four) that will face each other in a round-robin system. Division A consists of the 8 top teams in Europe based on the BSWW European Ranking. Division B consists of 12 of the lower ranked teams and new entries to the competition. Each division has its own regulations and competition format. This was due to the European qualifying tournament for the 2013 FIFA Beach Soccer World Cup being held during the EBSL season.

Each team competes in two preliminary events to see their points obtained accumulated into an overall ranking that will determine the teams that qualify for the Superfinal. The top six teams of Division A (including the individual Stage winners) will play in the Superfinal in The Hague, the Netherlands from August 23 – 26. The top four teams of Division B (including the individual Stage winners) plus the worst team in Division A and the host team Netherlands will play in the Promotional Final to try to earn promotion to Division A for the 2013 season.

Beginning this season, the Power Horse energy drink company has signed on to become the new sponsor of the EBSL. The logo has been slightly modified to show this.

== Eligible EBSL teams ==
The teams from Division A will compete for the Euro Beach Soccer League title while the teams from Division B will compete for promotion into next year's Division A.

2012 Euro Beach Soccer League Divisions
DIVISION A		DIVISION B		
France	Romania	Andorra	England	Hungary
Italy	Russia	Azerbaijan	Estonia	Norway
Poland	Spain	Belarus	Germany	Turkey
Portugal	Switzerland	Czech Republic	Greece	Ukraine

Note: Netherlands qualifies for Promotion Final as host nation without playing a match.

== Stage 1 Terracina, Italy – June, 8 – 10 ==
=== Participating nations ===
- Italy
- France
- Poland
- Portugal
- Romania
- Russia
- Spain
- Switzerland
- Belarus
- Czech Republic
- Hungary
- Norway

=== Final standings ===
==== Division A, Group A ====
Team	Pld	W	W+	L	GF	GA	+/-	Pts
Russia	3	3	0	0	16	8	+8	9
Portugal	3	1	1	1	12	9	+3	5
Spain	3	0	1	2	12	17	–5	2
France	3	0	0	3	14	20	–6	0

clinched Superfinal Berth

==== Division A, Group B ====
Team	Pld	W	W+	L	GF	GA	+/-	Pts
Switzerland	3	2	0	1	20	15	+5	6
Poland	3	0	2	1	21	23	–2	4
Italy	3	1	0	2	16	13	+3	3
Romania	3	1	0	2	12	18	–6	3

clinched Superfinal Berth

==== Division B ====
Team	Pld	W	W+	L	GF	GA	+/-	Pts
Belarus	3	2	0	1	15	9	+6	6
Czech Republic	3	2	0	1	12	5	+7	6
Hungary	3	2	0	1	15	17	–2	6
Norway	3	0	0	3	9	20	–11	0

Belarus win the stage on goal average

clinched Promotional Final Berth

=== Schedule and results ===
All kickoff times are of local time in Terracina (UTC+02:00).

8 June 2012
10:00

Czech Republic	7 – 0	Norway
P. Stejskal 8'; T. Zidlicky 10'; D. Filinger 10'; T. Hurab 13'; M. Chalupa 19'; M. Salak 27'; M. Bocek 35'	Report

Rive di Traiano, Terracina

8 June 2012
11:15

Hungary	3 – 9	Belarus
P. Abel 15'; T. Weisz 29'; S. Badalik 33'	Report	13', 18' V. Krupitsa; 15', 29', 31' I. Bryshtsel; 20' Karpau; 27', 33' V. Bokach; 29' I. Miranovich

Rive di Traiano, Terracina

8 June 2012
12:30

Switzerland	4 – 5	Romania
D. Stankovic 2', 13'; S. Spaccarotella 23'; A. Schirinzi 33'	Report	5' L. Croitoru; 5', 33' Maci; 27' I. Posteucă; 34' L. Chirilă

Rive di Traiano, Terracina
Referee: (Netherlands) Michael Scheffers

8 June 2012
13:45

France	6 – 9	Russia
M. Pagis 10', 23', 24'; A. Fayos 22', 36'; J. Basquaise 36'	Report	4', 4', 23', 28', 36' D. Shishin; 10', 31' E. Eremeev; 16' E. Shaykov; 32' Y. Gorchinskiy

Rive di Traiano, Terracina

8 June 2012
16:15

Portugal	6 – 5 (a.e.t.)	Spain
B. Novo 15', 16'; N. Belchior 17', 32', 37'; Madjer 19'	Report	8', 16', 30' Juanma; 10' R. Amarelle; 19' C. Torres

Rive di Traiano, Terracina

8 June 2012
17:30

Poland	7 – 6 (a.e.t.)	Italy
T. Wydmuszek 10', 16'; B. Saganowski 16', 37'; M. Widzicki 19'; P. Friszkemut 29'; W. Ziober 31'	Report	1', 2' F. Corosiniti; 13' D. Ramaciotti; 21', 30', 31' P. Palmacci

Rive di Traiano, Terracina

9 June 2012
12:30

Belarus	5 – 4	Norway
L. Melandez 8' (o.g.); I. Miranovich 16', 29'; V. Krupitsa 26'; I. Bryshtsel 32'	Report	12' Senja (T.-R. Sorensen); 29' B. Ellingsen; 35', 36' E. Hansen

Rive di Traiano, Terracina

9 June 2012
13:45

Czech Republic	3 – 4	Hungary
M. Salak 16'; M. Bocek 33'; T. Hurab 33'	Report	3', 5' V. Fekete; 25' P. Jaksa; 36' F. Besenyei

Rive di Traiano, Terracina

9 June 2012
15:00

Switzerland	12 – 8	Poland
V. Jaeggy 17'; P. Borer 14', 21'; S. Leu 17', 34'; D. Stankovic 17', 30'; V. Jaeggy 18'; A. Schirinzi 23', 23', 36'; S. Meier 33'	Report	5' D. Depta; 8' T. Wydmuszek; 23' D. Baran; 25' K. Grzegorczyk; 30' W. Ziober; 33', 34' P. Friszkemut; 33' M. Widzicki

Rive di Traiano, Terracina

9 June 2012
16:15

Portugal	6 – 3	France
N. Belchior 6'; Madjer 12', 12'; Rui Coimbra 16'; B. Novo 22'; Jordan 33'	Report	12' M. Pagis; 12' J.-M. Edouard; 35' A. Fayos

Rive di Traiano, Terracina

9 June 2012
17:30

Russia	6 – 2	Spain
E. Shaykov 6', 14'; D. Shishin 9', 36'; A. Makarov 12', 30'	Report	22' J. Torres; 24' C. Torres

Rive di Traiano, Terracina

9 June 2012
18:45

Italy	8 – 2	Romania
P. Palmacci 3', 19', 24', 32'; F. Corosiniti 4', 15'; M. Leghissa 17', 26'	Report	3' Maci; 5' L. Chirilă

Rive di Traiano, Terracina

10 June 2012
10:15

Norway	5 – 8	Hungary
Senja (T.-R. Sorensen); B. Ellingsen, E. Hansen; L. Melandez	Report	,,, V. Fekete, S. Badalik; P. Jaksa; P. Abel

Rive di Traiano, Terracina

10 June 2012
11:30

Belarus	1 – 2	Czech Republic
I. Bryshtsel 23'	Report	2' M. Bocek; 12' D. Filinger

Rive di Traiano, Terracina

10 June 2012
12:45

Poland	6 – 5 (a.e.t.)	Romania
B. Saganowski 1', 27', 37'; W. Ziober 33', 39'; T. Wydmuszek 35'	Report	4' I. Posteucă; 20', 30' M. Posteucă; 31', 38' Maci

Rive di Traiano, Terracina

10 June 2012
14:00

Spain	5 – 5 (a.e.t.)	France
R. Amarelle 2', 15'; D. Samoun 14' (o.g.); J. Torres 26', 28'	Report	2', 3' J. Basquaise; 5' A. Mendy; 8' M. Pagis; 31' D. Samoun
Penalties
R. Amarelle (penalty scored)	1 – 0	(penalty missed) M. Pagis

Rive di Traiano, Terracina

10 June 2012
15:15

Italy	2 – 4	Switzerland
G. Gori 5'; P. Palmacci 36'	Report	6' S. Lutz; 14', 26', 35' D. Stankovic

Rive di Traiano, Terracina

10 June 2012
16:30

Russia	1 – 0	Portugal
A. Bukhlitskiy 8'	Report

Rive di Traiano, Terracina

=== Individual awards ===
MVP: (Italy) Paolo Palmacci
Top Scorer: (Italy) Paolo Palmacci (8 goals)
Best goalkeeper: (Russia) Andrey Bukhlitskiy

== Stage 2 Berlin, Germany – August, 3 – 5 ==
=== Participating nations ===
- Germany
- Russia
- France
- Italy
- Romania
- Turkey
- Greece
- Azerbaijan

=== Final standings Division A ===
Team	Pld	W	W+	L	GF	GA	+/-	Pts
Russia	3	3	0	0	15	6	+9	9
Romania	3	0	2	1	11	15	–4	4
Italy	3	1	0	2	14	13	+1	3
France	3	0	0	3	12	18	–6	0

clinched Superfinal Berth

=== Final standings Division B ===
Team	Pld	W	W+	L	GF	GA	+/-	Pts
Germany	3	3	0	0	9	4	+5	9
Azerbaijan	3	2	0	1	14	11	+3	6
Greece	3	1	0	2	9	10	–1	3
Turkey	3	0	0	3	8	15	–7	0

clinched Promotional Final Berth

=== Schedule and results ===
All kickoff times are of local time in Berlin (UTC+02:00).

3 August 2012
12:30

Romania	4 – 4 (a.e.t.)	Italy
Maci 2'; F. Corosiniti 15' (o.g.); M. Posteucă 32'; I. Posteucă 34'	Report	10' M. Leghissa; 16' G. Gori; 18' F. Corosiniti; 22' M. Marrucci
Penalties
Maci (penalty scored)	1 – 0	(penalty missed) S. Feudi

O2 World, Berlin
Referee: (Belgium) Emanuel Vocale

3 August 2012
13:45

Turkey	2 – 5	Greece
A. Muftuoglu 2'; B. Terzioglu 33'	Report	4', 13' Ni. Bertsias; 7' E. Kouvaras; 8' I. Bousmpouras; 17' Ne. Bertsias

O2 World, Berlin
Referee: (Switzerland) Roman Walder

3 August 2012
15:00

France	2 – 5	Russia
D. Samoun 7'; J. Basquaise 25'	Report	11', 22', 25' D. Shishin; 26' A. Makarov; 32' E. Eremeev

O2 World, Berlin
Referee: (Poland) Tomas Winiarcyzk

3 August 2012
16:15

Azerbaijan	2 – 3	Germany
Elvin Guliyev 29'; J. Bakshaliyev 33'	Report	6' F. Goller; 8' S. Ullrich; 19' C. Thürk

O2 World, Berlin
Referee: (Italy) Giuseppe Melfi

4 August 2012
12:30

Romania	5 – 4 (a.e.t.)	France
M. Posteucă 6'; Maci 9'; R. Gasset 12' (o.g.); I. Florea 12'; L. Croitoru 37'	Report	7' Favolini; 16' J.-M. Edouard; 18' S. Francois; 19' D. Samoun

O2 World, Berlin
Referee: (Russia) Alexander Berezkin

4 August 2012
13:45

Turkey	5 – 6	Azerbaijan
Tamer Ay 3'; A. Sezer 13'; E. Eriten 13'; B. Terzioglu 19'; E. Anzaflioglu 32'	Report	4' E. Kurdov; 7', 34', 36' Z. Zeynalov; 14', 27' H. Baghirov

O2 World, Berlin
Referee: (Italy) Giuseppe Melfi

4 August 2012
15:00

Russia	3 – 2	Italy
Y. Krasheninnikov 4'; A. Makarov 19'; R. Zaikin 29'	Report	4' F. Corosiniti; 35' G. Gori

O2 World, Berlin
Referee: (Hungary) Peter Herbaly

4 August 2012
16:15

Germany	2 – 1	Greece
C. Thürk 3'; O. Romrig 23'	Report	32' I. Bousmpouras

O2 World, Berlin
Referee: (Poland) Tomas Winiarcyzk

5 August 2012
11:30

Italy	8 – 6	France
G. Gori 4', 12', 33'; D. Ramaciotti 7', 31'; M. Marrucci 19'; S. Marinai 27', 30'	Report	3' D. Samoun; 19', 21', 23' J. Basquaise; 20' S. Francois; 26' F. Mendy

O2 World, Berlin
Referee: (Switzerland) Roman Walder

5 August 2012
12:45

Greece	3 – 6	Azerbaijan
K. Papastathopoulos 5'; P. Konstantakopoulos 9', 22'	Report	5' H. Baghirov; 10', 20', 28' Elvin Guliyev; 24' A. Zeynal; 32' J. Bakshaliyev

O2 World, Berlin
Referee: (Belgium) Emanuel Vocale

5 August 2012
14:00

Russia	7 – 2	Romania
D. Shishin 4', 25', 26', 31'; A. Makarov 7'; Y. Krasheninnikov 21'; E. Eremeev 23'	Report	1' I. Florea; 32' M. Posteucă

O2 World, Berlin
Referee: (Poland) Tomas Winiarcyzk

5 August 2012
15:15

Germany	4 – 1	Turkey
C. Thürk 18'; S. Ullrich 19', 29'; O. Romrig 35'	Report	35' A. Muftuoglu

O2 World, Berlin
Referee: (Italy) Giuseppe Melfi

=== Individual awards ===
MVP: (Russia) Dmitry Shishin
Top Scorer: (Russia) Dmitry Shishin (7 goals)
Best goalkeeper: (Russia) Danila Ippolitov

== Stage 3 Torredembarra, Spain – August, 17 – 19 ==
=== Participating nations ===
- Spain
- Poland
- Portugal
- Switzerland
- England
- Andorra
- Estonia
- Ukraine

=== Final standings Division A ===
Team	Pld	W	W+	L	GF	GA	+/-	Pts
Switzerland	3	2	0	1	17	14	+3	6
Spain	3	0	2	1	11	12	–1	4
Portugal	3	1	0	2	17	19	–2	3
Poland	3	1	0	2	9	9	0	3

clinched Superfinal Berth

=== Final standings Division B ===
Team	Pld	W	W+	L	GF	GA	+/-	Pts
Ukraine	3	3	0	0	27	7	+20	9
Estonia	3	2	0	1	16	11	+5	6
England	3	1	0	2	9	15	–6	3
Andorra	3	0	0	3	6	25	–19	0

clinched Promotional Final Berth

=== Schedule and results ===
All kickoff times are of local time in Torredembarra (UTC+02:00).

17 August 2012
11:00

Ukraine	6 – 4	Estonia
V. Sydorenko 4'; R. Pachev 10', 20'; O. Zborovskyi 18', 35'; M. Anton 25' (o.g.)	Report	16', 33' A. Aniko; 28' A. Saharov; 36' A. Galkin

Platja de Torredembarra
Referee: (France) Wolff

17 August 2012
12:15

Andorra	3 – 4	England
A. Godoy 18'; D. Mejías 27', 34'	Report	16', 23' J. Temple; 18' S. Webb; 33' S. Lawson

Platja de Torredembarra
Referee: (Spain) Petrova

17 August 2012
13:30

Poland	1 – 1 (a.e.t.)	Spain
P. Friszkemut 31'	Report	6' J. Lima
Penalties
D. Baran (penalty scored); T. Wydmuszek (penalty missed); M. Olejniczak (penalty missed)	1 – 2	(penalty scored) R. Amarelle; (penalty missed) J. Lima; (penalty scored) M. Beiro

Platja de Torredembarra
Referee: (France) Benchabane

17 August 2012
14:45

Portugal	7 – 8	Switzerland
P. Graça 4'; J. Santos 11', 20', 22', 30'; J. Maria 18'; B. Torres 20'	Report	1' S. Leu; 8' (o.g.) R. Coimbra; 13' S. Spaccarotella; 15', 20', 34' K. Jaeggy; 20' M. Rodrigues; 32' A. Schirinzi

Platja de Torredembarra
Referee: (Turkey) Akcer

18 August 2012
10:00

Ukraine	13 – 1	Andorra
I. Riabchuk 4', 19', 34'; O. Zborovskyi 8', 19', 28', 35'; O. Budzko 12', 30'; V. Gladchenko 17'; O. Korniychuk 20'; O. Illichov 22'; K. Andreiev 31'	Report	31' M. Blázquez

Platja de Torredembarra
Referee: (Italy) Polito

18 August 2012
11:15

England	3 – 4	Estonia
J. Temple 4'; S. Lawson 10'; M. Evans 13'	Report	1' I. Siska; 2' A. Galkin; 25' A. Saharov; 30' M. Truusalu

Platja de Torredembarra
Referee: (Spain) Martinez

18 August 2012
12:30

Spain	5 – 8	Switzerland
L. Gomez 5', 12', 27', 35'; Kuman 28'	Report	1', 18' S. Spaccarotella; 13' S. Leu; 15' K. Jaeggy; 26', 30' A. Schirinzi; 33' M. Jaeggy; 36' P. Borer

Platja de Torredembarra
Referee: (France) Benchabane

18 August 2012
13:45

Portugal	7 – 6	Poland
J. Maria 14', 16', 23'; B. Novo 16'; J. Santos 20', 35'; R. Coimbra 36'	Report	16' (o.g.) B. Novo; 18' D. Baran; 20' P. Golanski; 28' L. Trzaskowski; 32' M. Olejniczak; 33' P. Friszkemut

Platja de Torredembarra
Referee: (France) Wolff

19 August 2012
15:00

Estonia	8 – 2	Andorra
A. Saharov 1', 6'; M. Lukk 16'; A. Galkin 18', 22'; M. Truusalu 21', 24', 29'	Report	14' D. Mejías; 15' M. Blázquez

Platja de Torredembarra
Referee: (Spain) Petrova

19 August 2012
16:15

England	2 – 8	Ukraine
J. Younie 9'; M. Day 29'	Report	9', 16', 31' O. Zborovskyi; 11' R. Pachev; 12' O. Korniychuk; 28' K. Andreiev; 29' O. Illichov; 32' V. Gladchenko

Platja de Torredembarra
Referee: (Switzerland) Zimmerman

19 August 2012
17:30

Switzerland	1 – 2	Poland
P. Borer 31'	Report	25', 29' P. Friszkemut

Platja de Torredembarra
Referee: (France) Benchabane

19 August 2012
18:45

Spain	5 – 3 (a.e.t.)	Portugal
J. Lima 15'; L. Gomez 23', 27', 37'; R. Amarelle 39'	Report	10' B. Novo; 22' R. Coimbra; 28' J. Maria

Platja de Torredembarra

=== Individual awards ===
MVP: (Spain) Llorenç Gómez
Top Scorer: (Spain) Llorenç Gómez (7 goals)
Best goalkeeper: (Portugal) Paulo Graça

== Cumulative standings ==
clinched Superfinal Berth	clinched Promotional Final Berth	clinched Promotional Final Berth (best Stage runner-up)

Ranking & tie-breaking criteria: Division A – 1. Points earned 2. Goal difference 3. Goals scored | Division B – 1. Points earned 2. Highest stage placement 3. Goal difference 4. Goals scored.

=== Division A ===
Pos	Team	Pld	W	W+	L	GF	GA	+/-	Pts
1	Russia	6	6	0	0	31	14	+17	18
2	Switzerland	6	4	0	2	37	29	+8	12
3	Portugal	6	2	1	3	29	28	+1	8
4	Poland	6	1	2	3	30	32	–2	7
5	Romania	6	1	2	3	23	33	–10	7
6	Italy	6	2	0	4	30	26	+4	6
7	Spain	6	0	3	3	23	29	–6	6
8	France	6	0	0	6	26	38	–12	0

=== Division B ===
Pos	Team	Pld	W	W+	L	GF	GA	+/-	Pts
1	Ukraine	3	3	0	0	27	7	+20	9
2	Germany	3	3	0	0	9	4	+5	9
3	Belarus	3	2	0	1	15	9	+6	6
4	Czech Republic	3	2	0	1	12	5	+7	6
5	Estonia	3	2	0	1	16	11	+5	6
6	Azerbaijan	3	2	0	1	14	11	+3	6
7	Hungary	3	2	0	1	15	17	–2	6
8	Greece	3	1	0	2	9	10	–1	3
9	England	3	1	0	2	9	15	–6	3
10	Turkey	3	0	0	3	8	15	–7	0
11	Norway	3	0	0	3	9	20	–11	0
12	Andorra	3	0	0	3	6	25	–19	0

== EBSL Superfinal and Promotional Final – The Hague, Netherlands – August, 23 – 26 ==
=== Superfinal and Promotional Final Divisions ===
The Divisions for the Euro Beach Soccer League Superfinal have not yet been determined. The teams from Division A will compete for the Euro Beach Soccer League title while the teams from Division B will compete for promotion into next year's Division A.

2012 Euro Beach Soccer League Superfinal Divisions
DIVISION A (Superfinal)		DIVISION B (Promotional Final)	
Russia	Poland	Netherlands	Germany
Switzerland	Romania	France	Czech Republic
Portugal	Italy	Ukraine	Belarus

automatic entry as hosts

=== Division A (Superfinal) ===
==== Group a standings ====
Team	Pld	W	W+	L	GF	GA	+/-	Pts
Russia	2	2	0	0	13	6	+7	6
Italy	2	1	0	1	9	7	+2	3
Poland	2	0	0	2	3	12	–9	0

clinched Superfinal Group

==== Group b standings ====
Team	Pld	W	W+	L	GF	GA	+/-	Pts
Switzerland	2	2	0	0	14	5	+9	6
Romania	2	1	0	1	7	11	–4	3
Portugal	2	0	0	2	7	12	–5	0

clinched Superfinal Group

=== Schedule and results ===
All kickoff times are of local time in The Hague (UTC+02:00).

==== Round-Robin ====
23 August 2012
16:15

Switzerland	7 – 2	Romania
D. Stankovic 17', 27', 33'; P. Borer 18'; S. Leu 19'; D. Ziegler 24'; K. Jaeggy 26'	Report	10' I. Florea; 15' Maci

The Hague Beach Stadium, Scheveningen, The Hague
Referee: (Netherlands) Michael Scheffers

23 August 2012
17:30

Russia	7 – 3	Italy
E. Eremeev 21', 31'; A. Makarov 19', 34'; D. Shishin 11'; I. Leonov 14'; E. Shaykov 28'	Report	16', 29' G. Gori; 20' D. Ramaciotti

The Hague Beach Stadium, Scheveningen, The Hague
Referee: (Hungary) Istvan Meszaros

24 August 2012
10:00

Portugal	4 – 5	Romania
L. Vaz 5', 22'; Madjer 24'; J. Maria 29'	Report	18', 21' I. Florea; 5' Maci; 7' A. Tănase; 22' L. Chirilă

The Hague Beach Stadium, Scheveningen, The Hague

24 August 2012
11:15

Poland	0 – 6	Italy
	Report	15', 17', 35' D. Ramaciotti; 18', 19' G. Gori; 21' F. Corosiniti

The Hague Beach Stadium, Scheveningen, The Hague

25 August 2012
12:15

Switzerland	7 – 3	Portugal
P. Borer 8', 17'; D. Stankovic 11', 27'; K. Jaeggy 5'; M. Jaeggy 34'; S. Spaccarotella 36'	Report	29' J. Santos; 34' R. Coimbra; 36' Madjer

The Hague Beach Stadium, Scheveningen, The Hague
Referee: (Russia) Alexander Berezkin

25 August 2012
14:00

Russia	6 – 3	Poland
D. Shishin 4', 5', 19'; E. Eremeev 3', 34'; Y. Krasheninnikov 28'	Report	30' D. Baran; 33' M. Widzicki; 36' W. Ziober

The Hague Beach Stadium, Scheveningen, The Hague
Referee: (Netherlands) Michael Scheffers

==== Fifth-place Match ====
26 August 2012
12:15

Poland	2 – 9	Portugal
D. Baran 13', 36'		4' R. Coimbra; 10' C. Delgado; 13' L. Vaz; 13' Marinho; 16' Madjer; 16', 18' J. Maria; 31', 32' B. Novo

The Hague Beach Stadium, Scheveningen, The Hague

==== Third-place Match ====
26 August 2012
13:30

Italy	5 – 1	Romania
G. Gori 4', 28'; M. Leghissa 8'; D. Ramacciotti 12'; F. Corosiniti 28'		22' I. Posteucă

The Hague Beach Stadium, Scheveningen, The Hague
Referee: (Netherlands) Michael Scheffers

==== Championship final Match ====
26 August 2012
16:00

Russia	5 – 6	Switzerland
I. Leonov 1', 22'; D. Shishin 4', 23'; A. Makarov 34'		3', 23' D. Stankovic; 10', 28' P. Borer; 24' M. Jaeggy; 29' S. Leu

The Hague Beach Stadium, Scheveningen, The Hague

=== Individual awards ===
MVP: (Russia) Dmitry Shishin
Top Scorer: (Switzerland) Dejan Stankovic (7 goals)
Best goalkeeper: (Switzerland) Valentin Jaeggy

=== Final Division A Standing ===
Rank	Team
1	Switzerland (First EBSL Title)
2	Russia
3	Italy
4	Romania
5	Portugal
6	Poland

=== Division B (Promotional Final) ===
==== Group a standings ====
Team	Pld	W	W+	L	GF	GA	+/-	Pts
Belarus	2	1	0	1	6	5	+1	3
Netherlands	2	1	0	1	7	7	0	3
Germany	2	1	0	1	6	7	–1	3

clinched Promotional Final Group

==== Group b standings ====
Team	Pld	W	W+	L	GF	GA	+/-	Pts
Ukraine	2	2	0	0	8	3	+5	6
France	2	1	0	1	7	9	–2	3
Czech Republic	2	0	0	2	4	7	–3	0

clinched Promotional Final Group

=== Schedule and results ===
All kickoff times are of local time in The Hague (UTC+02:00).

==== Round-Robin ====
23 August 2012
13:45

France	5 – 3	Czech Republic
G. Iborra 9'; A. Mendy 19'; O. Brüsch 19' (o.g.); M. Pagis 20'; J. Basquaise 24'	Report	12' O. Brüsch; 27' M. Chalupa; 28' J. Toman

The Hague Beach Stadium, Scheveningen, The Hague
Referee: (Italy) Alfredo Balconi

23 August 2012
15:00

Germany	3 – 2	Belarus
D. Castelli 22'; O. Romrig 27'; M. Heger 35'	Report	16', 33' E. Haiduk

The Hague Beach Stadium, Scheveningen, The Hague
Referee: (Switzerland) Michael Frey

24 August 2012
16:15

Ukraine	2 – 1	Czech Republic
O. Korniychuk 16'; K. Andreiev 35'	Report	2' M. Chalupa

The Hague Beach Stadium, Scheveningen, The Hague

24 August 2012
17:30

Netherlands	2 – 4	Belarus
L. Koswal 26', 27'	Report	4', 11' Karpau; 9', 18' V. Krupitsa

The Hague Beach Stadium, Scheveningen, The Hague

25 August 2012
11:30

France	2 – 6	Ukraine
M. Pagis 18', 34'	Report	10', 20', 33', 35' O. Zborovskyi; 6' I. Riabchuk; 16' O. Korniychuk

The Hague Beach Stadium, Scheveningen, The Hague
Referee: (Italy) Alfredo Balconi

25 August 2012
15:15

Netherlands	5 – 3	Germany
M. van Gessel 10', 34'; P. Ax 17', 19'; L. Koswal 2'	Report	5' M. Heger; 17' S. Weirauch; 28' F. Goller

The Hague Beach Stadium, Scheveningen, The Hague
Referee: (Latvia) Eduards Borisevics

==== Fifth-place Match ====
26 August 2012
9:45

Czech Republic	3 – 8	Germany
J. Toman 4'; M. Chalupa 5'; Mandik 27'		12', 18' F. Goller; 13', 36' D. Castelli; 15' A. Sokolowski; 27' S. Ullrich; 35' A. Kniller; 36' C. Thürk

The Hague Beach Stadium, Scheveningen, The Hague

==== Third-place Match ====
26 August 2012
14:45

France	4 – 7	Netherlands
J. Basquaise 16', 32'; F. Marques 8'; F. Gnepo 21'		2', 16' E. van Rooijen; 30', 33' M. van Gessel; 3' P. Tosch; 18' P. Ax; 30' L. Koswal

The Hague Beach Stadium, Scheveningen, The Hague

==== Championship final Match ====
26 August 2012
11:00

Ukraine	1 – 1 (a.e.t.)	Belarus
O. Zborovskyi 9'		25' I. Bryshtsel
Penalties
O. Korniychu (penalty scored); I. Borsuk (penalty scored)	2 – 1	(penalty scored) I. Bryshtsel; (penalty missed) E. Haiduk

The Hague Beach Stadium, Scheveningen, The Hague

=== Final Division B Standing ===
Rank	Team
1	Ukraine (promoted to 2013 EBSL Division A)
2	Belarus (promoted to 2013 EBSL Division A)
3	Netherlands (promoted to 2013 EBSL Division A)
4	France (promoted to 2013 EBSL Division A)
5	Germany (promoted to 2013 EBSL Division A)
6	Czech Republic

BSWW increased the number of participating teams in Division A from eight to twelve in 2013, meaning five nations, rather than the usual one, were promoted at the end of this season.

== See also ==
- Beach soccer
- Euro Beach Soccer League
