= 2013 Euro Beach Soccer League =

Tournament details
- Teams: 24 (from 1 confederation)
- Venues: 6 (in 6 host cities)

Final positions
- Champions: Russia (3rd title)
- Runners-up: Portugal
- Third place: Switzerland
- Fourth place: Spain

Tournament statistics
- Matches played: 86
- Goals scored: 635 (7.38 per match)

The 2013 Euro Beach Soccer League (EBSL) is an annual European competition in beach soccer. The competitions allows national teams to compete in beach soccer in a league format over the summer months. Each season ends with a Superfinal, deciding the competition winner.

This season, there are twelve teams each participating in two divisions in each Stage (there are a record number of five Stages this year) that will face each other in a round-robin system. Division A consists of the 12 top teams in Europe based on the BSWW European Ranking. Division B consists of 12 of the lower ranked teams and new entries to the competition. Each division has its own regulations and competition format.

Each team competes in two preliminary events to see their points obtained accumulated into an overall ranking that will determine the teams that qualify for the Superfinal. Due to the newly expanded format this season, the top eight teams of Division A (including the individual Stage winners and the host team Spain) will play in the Superfinal in Torredembarra, Spain from 8–11 August. The top seven teams of Division B (including the individual Stage winners) plus the worst team in Division A will play in the Promotional Final to try to earn promotion to Division A for the 2014 season.

Once again this season, the Power Horse energy drink company is the main sponsor of the EBSL. The logo has been slightly modified to show this.

== Eligible EBSL Teams ==
The teams from Division A will compete for the Euro Beach Soccer League title while the teams from Division B will compete for promotion into next year's Division A.

2013 Euro Beach Soccer League Divisions
DIVISION A			DIVISION B		
Belarus	Netherlands	Russia	Andorra	England	Israel
France	Poland	Spain	Azerbaijan	Estonia	Moldova
Germany	Portugal	Switzerland	Bulgaria	Greece	Norway
Italy	Romania	Ukraine	Czech Republic	Hungary	Turkey

== Stage 1 Kyiv, Ukraine – May, 24 – 26 ==
=== Participating nations ===
- France
- Poland
- Switzerland
- Ukraine

=== Final standings Division A ===
Team	Pld	W	W+	L	GF	GA	+/-	Pts
Poland	3	2	1	0	14	10	+4	8
Ukraine	3	2	0	1	17	8	+9	6
Switzerland	3	1	0	2	12	14	−2	3
France	3	0	0	3	9	20	−11	0

clinched Superfinal Berth

=== Schedule and results ===
All kickoff times are of local time in Kyiv (UTC+03:00).

24 May 2013
18:30

Switzerland	3 – 5	Poland
S. Meier 6'; K. Jaeggy 19'; D. Stankovic 20' (pen.)	Report	1', 14' M. Widzicki; 11' D. Baran; 20' B. Saganowski; 36' (o.g.) S. Leu

Hydropark, Kyiv

24 May 2013
19:45

France	0 – 10	Ukraine
	Report	2', 3', 25' O. Zborovskyi; 10' V. Sydorenko; 13' A. Korniychuk; 20' I. Borsuk; 21' R. Pachev; 23', 28' A. Borsuk; 24' E. Riabchuk

Hydropark, Kyiv

25 May 2013
14:00

Switzerland	6 – 5	France
S. Leu 7', 32'; V. Jaeggy 11'; S. Spaccarotella 25'; D. Stankovic 30'; M. Jaeggy 35'	Report	5', 29' S. Sansoni; 17' A. Fayos; 25' J. Soares; 34' J. Bru

Hydropark, Kyiv

25 May 2013
15:15

Ukraine	3 – 5	Poland
O. Zborovskyi 13'; R. Pachev 20', 35'	Report	8', 19' B. Saganowski; 9' T. Wydmuszek; 18', 34' D. Baran

Hydropark, Kyiv

26 May 2013
14:00

Poland	4 – 4 (a.e.t.)	France
B. Piechnik 5'; P. Friszkemut 13'; T. Lenart 23'; M. Widzicki 31'	Report	12', 22' M. Pagis; 32', 36' (pen.) A. Fayos
Penalties
D. Baran (penalty scored)	1 – 0	(penalty missed) J. Basquaise

Hydropark, Kyiv

26 May 2013
15:15

Ukraine	4 – 3	Switzerland
I. Borsuk 3'; O. Zborovskyi 14', 16'; R. Pachev 34'	Report	21' S. Leu; 24' S. Lutz; 25' D. Stankovic

Hydropark, Kyiv

=== Individual awards ===
MVP: (Poland) Bogusław Saganowski
Top Scorer: (Ukraine) Oleg Zborovskyi (6 goals)
Best Goalkeeper: (Ukraine) Vitalii Sydorenko

=== Total Goals ===
53 goals were scored, for an average of 8.83 goals per match.

== Stage 2 Terracina, Italy – June, 14 – 16 ==
=== Participating nations ===
- Italy
- Netherlands
- Romania
- Ukraine
- Belarus
- Germany
- Portugal
- Russia
- Azerbaijan
- Hungary
- Israel
- Turkey

=== Final standings Division A Group 1 ===
Team	Pld	W	W+	L	GF	GA	+/-	Pts
Netherlands	3	2	0	1	11	14	−3	6
Italy	3	2	0	1	12	9	+3	6
Ukraine	3	1	0	2	11	7	+4	3
Romania	3	1	0	2	6	10	−4	3

=== Final standings Division A Group 2 ===
Team	Pld	W	W+	L	GF	GA	+/-	Pts
Portugal	3	3	0	0	14	6	+8	9
Russia	3	2	0	1	12	12	0	6
Belarus	3	1	0	2	6	7	−1	3
Germany	3	0	0	3	5	12	−7	0

clinched Superfinal Berth

=== Final standings Division B ===
Team	Pld	W	W+	L	GF	GA	+/-	Pts
Israel	3	2	0	1	18	10	+8	6
Turkey	3	2	0	1	15	12	+3	6
Hungary	3	1	1	1	8	9	−1	5
Azerbaijan	3	0	0	3	7	17	−10	0

clinched Promotional Final Berth

Note: Although the Netherlands won their group, they were not automatically qualified for the Superfinal, as Portugal had the better group-winner record.

=== Schedule and results ===
All kickoff times are of local time in Terracina (UTC+02:00).

14 June 2013
11:45

Hungary	1 – 3	Turkey
M. Ughy 25'	Report	20' O. Zayim; 30' A. Muftuoglu; 32' B. Terzioglu

Rive di Traiano, Terracina

14 June 2013
13:00

Israel	7 – 1	Azerbaijan
A. Yatim 5', 12'; Y. Badash 5', 12'; I. Iloz 10', 15'; A. Lam 27'	Report	23' R. Aliyev

Rive di Traiano, Terracina

14 June 2013
14:15

Ukraine	8 – 1	Netherlands
O. Zborovskyi 1', 14', 28'; I. Borsuk 2'; V. Sydorenko 27'; E. Riabchuk 29', 30'; A. Borsuk 36'	Report	20' P. Ax

Rive di Traiano, Terracina

14 June 2013
15:30

Portugal	2 – 1	Belarus
R. Coimbra 17' (pen.); A. Cavalcanti 26'	Report	2' I. Miranovich

Rive di Traiano, Terracina

14 June 2013
16:45

Germany	3 – 4	Russia
F. Svenson 28', 29'; Keppinho 36'	Report	1' A. Peremitin; 21', 26' D. Shishin; 29' (pen.) E. Eremeev

Rive di Traiano, Terracina

14 June 2013
18:00

Italy	4 – 2	Romania
A. Frainetti 5'; F. Corosiniti 10'; G. Platania 25'; P. Palmacci 26'	Report	17' I. Posteuca; 32' Maci

Rive di Traiano, Terracina

15 June 2013
11:45

Hungary	3 – 2	Israel
N. Sebestyen 26'; M. Ughy 31'; T. Weisz 32'	Report	5', 19' Y. Badash

Rive di Traiano, Terracina

15 June 2013
13:00

Azerbaijan	2 – 6	Turkey
J. Bakshaliyev 20'; O. Mammadov 33'	Report	10' (pen.), 33' O. Zayim; 11', 32' B. Terzioglu; 13' A. Muftuoglu; 17' S. Suer

Rive di Traiano, Terracina

15 June 2013
14:15

Romania	2 – 1	Ukraine
A. Tanase 7'; L. Chirila 33'	Report	34' O. Zborovskyi

Rive di Traiano, Terracina

15 June 2013
15:30

Portugal	5 – 1	Germany
A. Cavalcanti 3', 35'; J. M. Veiga 21', 36'; N. Belchior 28' (pen.)	Report	12' Keppinho

Rive di Traiano, Terracina

15 June 2013
16:45

Russia	4 – 2	Belarus
A. Peremitin 7', 32'; Y. Krasheninnikov 27'; I. Leonov 28'	Report	2' (o.g.) A. Shkarin; 28' O. Svalutsin

Rive di Traiano, Terracina

15 June 2013
18:00

Netherlands	5 – 4	Italy
J. Klijbroek 5' (pen.); M. van Gessel 13', 26' (pen.); P. Ax 27', 34'	Report	17' F. Corosiniti; 29', 33' A. Frainetti; 36' G. Soria

Rive di Traiano, Terracina

16 June 2013
11:45

Turkey	6 – 9	Israel
C. Keskin 12', 15', 16'; V. Yesilirmak 24', 30'; A. Muftuoglu 31'	Report	5', 16', 17' A. Yatim; 8' L. Fartok; 18' A. Levi; 20' Y. Shina; 27' A. Lam; 31' (o.g.) V. Yesilirmak; 36' A. Danin

Rive di Traiano, Terracina

16 June 2013
13:00

Azerbaijan	4 – 4 (a.e.t.)	Hungary
J. Bakshaliyev 5', 11' (pen.); O. Mammadov 9', 34'	Report	11' G. Simonyi; 17' F. Besenyei; 28', 31' L. Berkes
Penalties
J. Bakshaliyev (penalty missed); A. Nazarov (penalty missed); V. Borisov (penalty missed); A. Zeynal (penalty missed)	0 – 1	(penalty missed) F. Besenyei; (penalty missed) G. Simonyi; (penalty missed) L. Berkes; (penalty scored) N. Sebestyen

Rive di Traiano, Terracina

16 June 2013
14:15

Romania	2 – 5	Netherlands
R. Carauleanu 7'; I. Posteuca 33'	Report	4' N. Kokmeijer; 4' F. van der Geest; 16' M. van Gessel; 17' P. Ax; 26' L. Koswal

Rive di Traiano, Terracina

16 June 2013
15:30

Belarus	3 – 1	Germany
I. Bryshtsel 4'; V. Bokach 21'; O. Svalutsin 26'	Report	1' (o.g.) A. Davidovich

Rive di Traiano, Terracina

16 June 2013
16:45

Russia	4 – 7	Portugal
A. Shkarin 15'; E. Eremeev 18', 30'; A. Bukhlitskiy 21'	Report	4', 4', 6' N. Belchior; 17' L. Carmo; 20' A. Cavalcanti; 30' B. Novo; 36' R. Coimbra

Rive di Traiano, Terracina

16 June 2013
18:00

Ukraine	2 – 4	Italy
E. Riabchuk 11'; D. Medved 20'	Report	7' G. Soria; 25', 34' D. Ramacciotti; 35' G. Platania

Rive di Traiano, Terracina

=== Individual awards ===
MVP: (Portugal) Belchior
Top Scorer: (Portugal) Alan, (Portugal) Belchior, (Ukraine) Oleg Zborovskyi, (Netherlands) Patrick Ax (4 goals)
Best Goalkeeper: (Italy) Stefano Spada

=== Total Goals ===
126 goals were scored, for an average of 7 goals per match.

== Stage 3 Valence, France – June, 21 – 23 ==
=== Participating nations ===
- France
- Portugal
- Spain
- Switzerland
- Andorra
- Czech Republic
- England
- Moldova

=== Final standings Division A ===
Team	Pld	W	W+	L	GF	GA	+/-	Pts
Switzerland	3	3	0	0	27	9	+18	9
Spain	3	2	0	1	12	14	−2	6
Portugal	3	1	0	2	9	11	−2	3
France	3	0	0	2	7	21	−14	0

clinched Superfinal Berth

=== Final standings Division B ===
Team	Pld	W	W+	L	GF	GA	+/-	Pts
England	3	2	1	0	8	5	+3	8
Czech Republic	3	2	0	1	22	10	+12	6
Moldova	3	1	0	2	10	14	−3	3
Andorra	3	0	0	3	10	21	−11	0

clinched Promotional Final Berth

=== Schedule and results ===
All kickoff times are of local time in Valence (UTC+02:00).

21 June 2013
14:45

Moldova	3 – 9	Czech Republic
A. Negara 5', 20'; G. Cojocari 17'	Report	6', 18' D. Filinger; 11', 21' P. Stejskal; 15' M. Kubice; 20' J. Kovarik; 25' M. Chalupa; 27' Z. Slama; 34' M. Bocek

Parc Jean-Perdrix, Valence

21 June 2013
16:00

England	4 – 2	Andorra
J. Temple 7'; M. Mitchell 9'; M. Evans 11'; M. Day 13'	Report	15' A. Somoza; 16' I. Lima

Parc Jean-Perdrix, Valence

21 June 2013
17:15

Portugal	3 – 4	Spain
L. Carmo 16', 31'; A. Cavalcanti 34'	Report	5', 19' L. Gomez; 15' R. F. Amarelle; 29' F. J. Cintas

Parc Jean-Perdrix, Valence

21 June 2013
18:30

France	4 – 12	Switzerland
S. Sansoni 5'; J. Basquaise 23', 36'; A. Fayos 30'	Report	3', 10', 12', 30' D. Stankovic; 5' S. Meier; 8', 29', 30' M. Jaeggy; 9', 33' N. Ott; 13', 26' P. Borer

Parc Jean-Perdrix, Valence

22 June 2013
14:15

Czech Republic	11 – 5	Andorra
M. Bocek 2', 5', 14', 23'; M. Chalupa 11', 17', 25', 30'; P. Stejskal 11'; M. Kubice 17'; J. Kovarik 36'	Report	10' J. Rubio; 14' I. Lima; 18' M. Blazquez; 28', 31' L. Clemente

Parc Jean-Perdrix, Valence

22 June 2013
15:30

England	2 – 1	Moldova
A. Clarke 14'; M. Corbett 32'	Report	35' (o.g.) M. Evans

Parc Jean-Perdrix, Valence

22 June 2013
16:45

Switzerland	6 – 2	Portugal
D. Stankovic 8', 13'; P. Borer 18'; S. Spaccarotella 19', 24'; M. Jaeggy 25'	Report	3' N. Belchior; 35' R. Coimbra

Parc Jean-Perdrix, Valence

22 June 2013
18:00

Spain	5 – 2	France
L. Gomez 7', 19' (pen.); R. F. Amarelle 20'; J. Lima 32'; A. Mayor 35'	Report	4' M. Pagis; 16' J. Basquaise

Parc Jean-Perdrix, Valence

23 June 2013
14:15

Andorra	3 – 6	Moldova
M. Blazquez 14', 17'; J. Toscano 21' (pen.)	Report	22' D. Butuc; 26', 32', 36' L. Podlesnov; 31' R. Istrati; 33' I. Racovita

Parc Jean-Perdrix, Valence

23 June 2013
15:30

Czech Republic	2 – 2 (a.e.t.)	England
Z. Slama 20'; P. Stejskal 32'	Report	29' M. Corbett; 35' S. Webb
Penalties
M. Chalupa (penalty scored); Z. Slama (penalty missed); J. Kovarik (penalty scored); M. Bocek (penalty scored); T. Hurab (penalty missed)	3 – 4	(penalty scored) M. Evans; (penalty missed) M. Mitchell; (penalty scored) D. Blake; (penalty scored) A. Clarke; (penalty scored) M. Day

Parc Jean-Perdrix, Valence

23 June 2013
16:45

Switzerland	9 – 3	Spain
P. Borer 4', 33', 36', 36'; D. Stankovic 14', 15'; S. Spaccarotella 18'; M. Misev 21', 34'	Report	4' J. Lima; 6' R. Merida; 18' D. Pajon

Parc Jean-Perdrix, Valence

23 June 2013
18:00

France	1 – 4	Portugal
S. Sansoni 1'	Report	7' B. Novo; 17' J. M. Veiga; 22' R. Coimbra; 24' (pen.) J. Santos

Parc Jean-Perdrix, Valence

=== Individual awards ===
MVP: (Switzerland) Dejan Stankovic
Top Scorer: (Switzerland) Dejan Stankovic (8 goals)
Best Goalkeeper: (Switzerland) Valentin Jaeggy

=== Total Goals ===
105 goals were scored, for an average of 8.75 goals per match.

== Stage 4 The Hague, Netherlands – July, 19 – 21 ==
=== Participating nations ===
- Belarus
- Italy
- Netherlands
- Poland
- Bulgaria
- Estonia
- Greece
- Norway

=== Final standings Division A ===
Team	Pld	W	W+	L	GF	GA	+/-	Pts
Poland	3	2	0	1	16	13	+3	6
Italy	3	2	0	1	12	8	+4	6
Netherlands	3	1	1	1	9	9	0	5
Belarus	3	0	0	3	8	15	−7	0

clinched Superfinal Berth

=== Final standings Division B ===
Team	Pld	W	W+	L	GF	GA	+/-	Pts
Greece	3	2	1	0	15	9	+6	8
Estonia	3	2	0	1	9	9	0	6
Bulgaria	3	0	1	2	9	12	−3	2
Norway	3	0	0	3	9	12	−3	0

clinched Promotional Final Berth

=== Schedule and results ===
All kickoff times are of local time in The Hague (UTC+02:00).

19 July 2013
14:15

Netherlands	5 – 3	Poland
P. Ax 6', 11', 11'; M. Van Gessel 9'; R. Van Dieren 16'	Report	22' M. Widzicki; 26' B. Saganowski; 35' D. Baran

The Hague Beach Stadium, Scheveningen, The Hague

19 July 2013
15:30

Greece	5 – 4 (a.e.t.)	Norway
N. Bertsias 17', 38'; S. Amanatidis 18'; Paris 23'; G. Karakasis 35'	Report	4', 23', 35', 35' H. Salveson

The Hague Beach Stadium, Scheveningen, The Hague

19 July 2013
16:45

Bulgaria	2 – 4	Estonia
S. Hristov 17'; F. Filipov 27'	Report	8' A. Aniko; 18' A. Saharov; 33', 36' K. Marmor

The Hague Beach Stadium, Scheveningen, The Hague

19 July 2013
18:00

Italy	4 – 2	Belarus
G. Gori 5', 36' (pen.); D. Ramacciotti 13', 30'	Report	13' I. Miranovich; 17' A. Slavutsin

The Hague Beach Stadium, Scheveningen, The Hague

20 July 2013
10:00

Greece	7 – 5	Bulgaria
K. Tsvetkov 1' (o.g.); T. Triantafyllidis 3', 25'; Paris 17'; N. Bertsias 21', 31'; S. Hristov 29' (o.g.)	Report	19' Dimitrov; 26' S. Hristov; 27' K. Belinov; 28', 33' K. Tsvetkov

The Hague Beach Stadium, Scheveningen, The Hague

20 July 2013
11:15

Estonia	5 – 4	Norway
K. Viikmae 5'; A. Saharov 15'; V. Tammevali 21'; P. Maerog 26'; K. Marmor 33'	Report	9' T.-R. Sorenson; 15', 20' H. Salveson; 18' Aoudia

The Hague Beach Stadium, Scheveningen, The Hague

20 July 2013
12:30

Italy	5 – 6	Poland
G. Gori 14', 28'; D. Ramacciotti 28', 35'; M. Marrucci 34'	Report	6' D. Slowinski; 19' D. Baran; 21' B. Piechnik; 25' B. Saganowski; 28', 31' W. Ziober

The Hague Beach Stadium, Scheveningen, The Hague

20 July 2013
13:45

Belarus	3 – 4 (a.e.t.)	Netherlands
R. Van Dieren 3' (o.g.); I. Bryshtsel 13'; A. Slavutsin 35'	Report	11' (pen.) P. Ax; 12', 29', 37' P. Tosch

The Hague Beach Stadium, Scheveningen, The Hague

21 July 2013
10:00

Norway	1 – 2 (a.e.t.)	Bulgaria
Pedersen 6'	Report	7' S. Hristov; 37' G. Minkov

The Hague Beach Stadium, Scheveningen, The Hague

21 July 2013
11:15

Estonia	0 – 3	Greece
	Report	14' T. Triantafyllidis; 18' K. Papastathopoulos; 30' S. Amanatidis

The Hague Beach Stadium, Scheveningen, The Hague

21 July 2013
12:30

Poland	7 – 3	Belarus
B. Saganowski 8', 28', 29', 36'; T. Friszkemut 10'; D. Baran 23', 27'	Report	2' V. Krupitsa; 16', 21' V. Bokach

The Hague Beach Stadium, Scheveningen, The Hague

21 July 2013
13:45

Netherlands	0 – 3	Italy
	Report	8' S. Spada; 19' A. Frainetti; 31' G. Gori

The Hague Beach Stadium, Scheveningen, The Hague

=== Individual awards ===
MVP: (Netherlands) Patrick Ax
Top Scorer: (Poland) Bogusław Saganowski (6 goals)
Best Goalkeeper: (Netherlands) Frank van der Geest

=== Total Goals ===
87 goals were scored, for an average of 7.25 goals per match.

== Stage 5 Moscow, Russia – August, 2 – 4 ==
=== Participating nations ===
- Germany
- Romania
- Russia
- Spain

=== Final standings Division A ===
Team	Pld	W	W+	L	GF	GA	+/-	Pts
Russia	3	3	0	0	10	3	+7	9
Spain	3	2	0	1	10	3	+7	6
Germany	3	1	0	2	7	8	–1	3
Romania	3	0	0	3	4	17	–13	0

clinched Superfinal Berth

=== Schedule and results ===
All kickoff times are of local time in Moscow (UTC+04:00).

2 August 2013
17:45

Romania	0 – 6	Spain
	Report	21' (pen.) F. J. Cintas; 24', 31', 31', 32' L. Gomez; 33' S. Ardil

Stadium "Dinamo", Moscow

2 August 2013
19:00

Germany	1 – 2	Russia
S. Ullrich 22'	Report	27' E. Shaykov; 35' I. Leonov

Stadium "Dinamo", Moscow

3 August 2013
17:45

Spain	2 – 0	Germany
D. Pajon 20'; F. Mejias 28'	Report

Stadium "Dinamo", Moscow

3 August 2013
19:00

Russia	5 – 0	Romania
I. Leonov 14'; Y. Krasheninnikov 14'; K. Romanov 20', 23'; E. Shaykov 30'	Report

Stadium "Dinamo", Moscow

4 August 2013
17:45

Romania	4 – 6	Germany
M. Maciuca 5', 20', 36' (pen.); R. Carauleanu 24'	Report	1' S. Korner; 9', 14', 28' (pen.) Keppinho; 15' O. Romrig; 25' (pen.) S. Weirauch

Stadium "Dinamo", Moscow

4 August 2013
19:00

Russia	3 – 2	Spain
A. Makarov 3'; I. Leonov 14'; E. Eremeev 23'	Report	1', 14' L. Gomez

Stadium "Dinamo", Moscow

=== Individual awards ===
MVP: (Russia) Ilya Leonov
Top Scorer: (Spain) Llorenç Gómez (6 goals)
Best Goalkeeper: (Germany) Sascha Penke

=== Total Goals ===
31 goals were scored, for an average of 5.17 goals per match.

== Cumulative standings ==
clinched Superfinal Berth	clinched Promotional Final Berth

Ranking & tie-breaking criteria: Division A – 1. Points earned 2. Goal difference 3. Goals scored | Division B – 1. Points earned 2. Highest stage placement 3. Goal difference 4. Goals scored.

=== Division A ===
Pos	Team	Pld	W	W+	L	GF	GA	+/-	Pts
1	Russia	6	5	0	1	22	15	+7	15
2	Poland	6	4	1	1	30	23	+7	14
3	Switzerland	6	4	0	2	39	23	+16	12
4	Italy	6	4	0	2	24	17	+7	12
5	Portugal	6	4	0	2	23	17	+6	12
6	Spain	6	4	0	2	22	17	+5	12
7	Netherlands	6	3	1	2	20	23	−3	11
8	Ukraine	6	3	0	3	28	15	+13	9
9	Belarus	6	1	0	5	14	22	−8	3
10	Germany	6	1	0	5	12	20	−8	3
11	Romania	6	1	0	5	10	27	−17	3
12	France	6	0	0	6	16	41	−25	0

=== Division B ===
Pos	Team	Pld	W	W+	L	GF	GA	+/-	Pts
1	Greece	3	2	1	0	15	9	+6	8
2	England	3	2	1	0	8	5	+3	8
3	Israel	3	2	0	1	18	10	+8	6
4	Czech Republic	3	2	0	1	22	10	+12	6
5	Turkey	3	2	0	1	15	12	+3	6
6	Estonia	3	2	0	1	9	9	0	6
7	Hungary	3	1	1	1	8	9	-1	5
8	Moldova	3	1	0	2	10	14	−4	3
9	Bulgaria	3	0	1	2	9	12	−3	2
10	Norway	3	0	0	3	9	12	−3	0
11	Azerbaijan	3	0	0	3	7	17	−10	0
12	Andorra	3	0	0	3	10	21	−11	0

== EBSL Superfinal and Promotional Final – Torredembarra, Spain – August, 8 – 11 ==
=== Superfinal and Promotional Final Divisions ===
The Divisions for the Euro Beach Soccer League Superfinal have now been determined. The teams from Division A will compete for the Euro Beach Soccer League title while the teams from Division B will compete for promotion into next year's Division A. The division of the Superfinal and Promotional Final Groups are based on how the cumulative standings for Divisions A and B finish. In Division A, Group A will have teams that finish in places 1, 4, 6 and 7, while Group B will have teams that finish in places 2, 3, 5 and 8. In Division B, Group A will have teams that finish in places 4, 5, 6 and the last-place team in Division A, while Group B will have teams that finish in places 1, 2, 3 and 7.

2013 Euro Beach Soccer League Superfinal Divisions
DIVISION A (Superfinal)		DIVISION B (Promotional Final)	
Russia	Poland	Israel	Greece
Italy	Switzerland	Turkey	England
Spain	Portugal	Estonia	Czech Republic
Netherlands	Ukraine	France	Hungary

=== Division A (Superfinal) ===
==== Group A Standings ====
Team	Pld	W	W+	L	GF	GA	+/-	Pts
Russia	3	2	0	1	14	12	+2	6
Spain	3	2	0	1	12	9	+3	6
Italy	3	1	1	1	14	12	+2	5
Netherlands	3	0	0	3	8	15	–7	0

clinched Championship Final

==== Group B Standings ====
Team	Pld	W	W+	L	GF	GA	+/-	Pts
Portugal	3	2	0	1	12	7	+5	6
Switzerland	3	2	0	1	19	15	+4	6
Poland	3	1	0	2	10	17	–7	3
Ukraine	3	1	0	2	8	10	–2	3

clinched Championship Final

=== Schedule and results ===
All kickoff times are of local time in Torredembarra (UTC+02:00).

==== Round-Robin ====
8 August 2013
15:15

Ukraine	1 – 3	Poland
O. Zborovskyi 4'	Report	10' W. Ziober; 30' B. Saganowski; 32' D. Baran

Platja de Torredembarra
Referee: (Hungary) Istvan Meszaros

8 August 2013
16:30

Netherlands	4 – 5	Russia
M. Van Gessel 15'; R. Liefden 22'; R. Van Dieren 28'; J. Klijbroek 32'	Report	7' A. Shkarin; 12', 35' D. Shishin; 17' I. Leonov; 21' E. Eremeev

Platja de Torredembarra
Referee: (France) Sofien Benchabane

8 August 2013
17:45

Switzerland	3 – 5	Portugal
P. Borer 23'; D. Stankovic 33'; M. Jaeggy 35'	Report	12', 26' B. Torres; 15', 36' N. Belchior; 32' J. M. Veiga

Platja de Torredembarra

8 August 2013
19:00

Italy	3 – 5	Spain
G. Gori 5', 8' (pen.); F. Corosiniti 24'	Report	5', 32' L. Gomez; 12' F. J. Cintas; 20' Nico; 22' A. Mayor

Platja de Torredembarra

9 August 2013
15:15

Switzerland	6 – 5	Ukraine
D. Stankovic 8', 9' (pen.); M. Jaeggy 11', 22'; M. Misev 12', 17'	Report	8', 21', 27' I. Borsuk; 31' O. Zborovskyi; 36' O. Budzko

Platja de Torredembarra

9 August 2013
16:30

Russia	5 – 6 (a.e.t.)	Italy
D. Shishin 3', 4'; A. Shkarin 6', 37'; A. Peremitin 17'	Report	2' (pen.), 19' G. Gori; 19', 35', 38', 39' P. Palmacci

Platja de Torredembarra
Referee: (Moldova) Oleg Cebotari

9 August 2013
17:45

Poland	2 – 6	Portugal
B. Saganowski 6'; W. Ziober 34'	Report	1' N. Belchior; 5', 26' J. Santos; 14' Madjer; 17' R. Coimbra; 18' J. M. Veiga

Platja de Torredembarra
Referee: (Italy) Fabio Polito

9 August 2013
19:00

Spain	5 – 2	Netherlands
F. Donaire 4'; A. Mayor 6' (pen.), 20'; L. Gomez 11', 13'	Report	6', 9' M. Van Gessel

Platja de Torredembarra
Referee: (Hungary) Istvan Meszaros

10 August 2013
15:15

Portugal	1 – 2	Ukraine
L. Carmo 29'	Report	3' A. Borsuk; 24' O. Budzko

Platja de Torredembarra

10 August 2013
16:30

Italy	5 – 2	Netherlands
F. Corosiniti 4'; G. Gori 11', 19', 20'; S. Marinai 18'	Report	9' M. Van Gessel; 29' L. Koswal

Platja de Torredembarra

10 August 2013
17:45

Poland	5 – 10	Switzerland
B. Saganowski 3', 26'; W. Ziober 17'; D. Baran 35'; B. Piechnik 36'	Report	1', 10', 27', 35', 36' D. Stankovic; 2' P. Borer; 5' S. Spaccarotella; 18' K. Jaeggy; 29' A. Schirinzi; 33' M. Jaeggy

Platja de Torredembarra
Referee: (Spain) Miguel Garcia

10 August 2013
19:00

Russia	4 – 2	Spain
A. Makarov 6'; Y. Gorchinskiy 8'; A. Peremitin 8'; E. Eremeev 36'	Report	6' D. Pajon; 29' J. Lima

Platja de Torredembarra
Referee: (Latvia) Eduards Borisevics

==== Seventh-place Match ====
11 August 2013
12:45

Netherlands	0 – 4	Ukraine
	Report	14' I. Borsuk; 25' A. Borsuk; 29' V. Sydorenko; 34' O. Zborovskyi

Platja de Torredembarra

==== Fifth-place Match ====
11 August 2013
14:00

Italy	5 – 6 (a.e.t.)	Poland
S. Marinai 7'; G. Platania 23'; G. Gori 29'; P. Palmacci 30'; F. Corosiniti 35'	Report	9', 22' B. Saganowski; 11' P. Golanski; 13' M. Widzicki; 27' T. Wydmuszek; 37' P. Friszkemut

Platja de Torredembarra

==== Third-place Match ====
11 August 2013
17:45

Spain	1 – 4	Switzerland
F. J. Cintas 12'	Report	4' M. Misev; 23' (pen.), 33' P. Borer; 27' D. Stankovic

Platja de Torredembarra

==== Championship final match ====
11 August 2013
19:00

Russia	8 – 3	Portugal
B. Torres 1' (o.g.); E. Eremeev 12', 16' (pen.); Y. Krasheninnikov 15', 29'; I. Leonov 17'; A. Peremitin 35' (pen.); K. Romanov 36'	Report	2', 7' N. Belchior; 22' (o.g.) A. Makarov

Platja de Torredembarra
Referee: (Spain) Pablo Brea

=== Individual awards ===
- MVP: (Russia) Ilya Leonov
- Top Scorer: (Switzerland) Dejan Stankovic (9 goals)
- Best Goalkeeper: (Spain) Francisco Donaire

=== Final Division A Standing ===
Rank	Team
1	Russia (Third EBSL title)
2	Portugal
3	Switzerland
4	Spain
5	Poland
6	Italy
7	Ukraine
8	Netherlands

=== Division B (Promotional Final) ===
==== Group A Standings ====
Team	Pld	W	W+	L	GF	GA	+/-	Pts
France	3	3	0	0	14	8	+6	9
Israel	3	2	0	1	10	10	0	6
Turkey	3	0	1	2	7	11	–4	2
Estonia	3	0	0	3	11	13	–2	0

clinched Promotional Final

==== Group B Standings ====
Team	Pld	W	W+	L	GF	GA	+/-	Pts
Greece	3	2	0	1	9	9	0	6
Hungary	3	2	0	1	13	9	+4	6
Czech Republic	3	1	0	2	8	14	–6	3
England	3	1	0	2	12	10	+2	3

clinched Promotional Final

=== Schedule and results ===
All kickoff times are of local time in Torredembarra (UTC+02:00).

==== Round-Robin ====
8 August 2013
10:15

Hungary	2 – 3	Greece
N. Sebestyen 20'; F. Besenyei 35'	Report	18' S. Papaestratiou; 18' S. Amanatidis; 34' G. Karakasis

Platja de Torredembarra

8 August 2013
11:30

Estonia	2 – 3	France
M. Truusalu 11'; R. Rand 29'	Report	29' S. Francois; 35' M. Pagis; 36' D. Samoun

Platja de Torredembarra

8 August 2013
12:45

England	3 – 4	Czech Republic
M. Day 14'; D. Blake 21'; T. Bowes 34'	Report	8' L. Karda; 10' M. Kubice; 25' T. Hurab; 29' J. Kovarik

Platja de Torredembarra

8 August 2013
14:00

Israel	1 – 0	Turkey
A. Danin 31'	Report

Platja de Torredembarra
Referee: (Italy) Fabio Polito

9 August 2013
10:15

Israel	4 – 3	Estonia
Y. Badash 5', 19'; Y. Shina 9'; A. Danin 35'	Report	1', 32' A. Saharov; 8' M. Truusalu

Platja de Torredembarra

9 August 2013
11:30

England	4 – 6	Hungary
M. Day 7', 13'; M. Evans 25'; T. Bowes 35'	Report	7', 10', 20' D. Csoszanszki; 18', 35' V. Fekete; 35' T. Weisz

Platja de Torredembarra

9 August 2013
12:45

Greece	6 – 2	Czech Republic
S. Papaestratiou 5'; Paris 14', 14', 35'; N. Bertsias 26'; G. Karakasis 33'	Report	29' M. Chalupa; 35' M. Dlouhy

Platja de Torredembarra

9 August 2013
14:00

France	4 – 1	Turkey
V. Yesilirmak 4' (o.g.); S. Francois 20', 35'; M. Pagis 25'	Report	34' Ç. Keskin

Platja de Torredembarra

10 August 2013
10:15

Czech Republic	2 – 5	Hungary
M. Kubice 10'; M. Dlouhy 11'	Report	14' V. Fekete; 15', 35' G. Simonyi; 25' T. Weisz; 31' L. Berkes

Platja de Torredembarra

10 August 2013
11:30

Turkey	6 – 6 (a.e.t.)	Estonia
B. Terzioglu 1', 3', 20', 22'; A. Muftuoglu 23'; C. Keskin 30'	Report	1', 20' A. Saharov; 4', 5' M. Truusalu; 14' A. Aniko; 23' A. Arst
Penalties
E. Anzafioglu (penalty scored) , (penalty scored); O. Zayim (penalty scored) , (penalty scored); C. Keskin (penalty scored) , (penalty scored); V. Yesilirmak (penalty scored); A. Muftuoglu (penalty scored); E. Eriten (penalty scored); B. Terzioglu (penalty scored); Y. Ergun (penalty scored); A. Sanlidere (penalty scored)	12 – 11	(penalty scored) , (penalty scored) M. Truusalu; (penalty scored) , (penalty scored) R. Rump; (penalty scored) , (penalty missed) A. Arst; (penalty scored) A. Saharov; (penalty scored) A. Aniko; (penalty scored) R. Rand; (penalty scored) P. Maerog; (penalty scored) T. Tammo; (penalty scored) R. Mironov

Platja de Torredembarra

10 August 2013
12:45

France	7 – 5	Israel
N. Boucenna 8'; D. Samoun 10'; M. Pagis 12', 29', 33'; B. Boina 19'; J.-M. Rodriguez 30'	Report	10', 26' A. Danin; 11', 32' I. Iloz; 12' Y. Badash

Platja de Torredembarra
Referee: (Italy) Fabio Polito

10 August 2013
14:00

Greece	0 – 5	England
	Report	1' M. Day; 16', 35' A. Clarke; 21' (pen.) D. Blake; 31' J. Temple

Platja de Torredembarra

==== Seventh-place Match ====
11 August 2013
10:15

Estonia	4 – 3	England
R. Rump 1', 21', 26'; M. Truusalu 9'	Report	16' S. Lawson; 23', 35' M. Evans

Platja de Torredembarra

==== Fifth-place Match ====
11 August 2013
11:30

Turkey	5 – 4 (a.e.t.)	Czech Republic
A. Muftuoglu 11'; V. Yesilirmak 16'; B. Terzioglu 23'; E. Anzafioglu 26'; O. Zayim 38'	Report	1', 26' L. Karda; 28' J. Kovarik; 28' M. Salak

Platja de Torredembarra

==== Third-place Match ====
11 August 2013
15:15

Israel	1 – 3	Hungary
O. Fahima 11'	Report	2' N. Sebestyen; 20' T. Weisz; 24' L. Berkes

Platja de Torredembarra
Referee: (Switzerland) Roman Walder

==== Promotional Final Match ====
11 August 2013
16:30

France	2 – 1	Greece
D. Samoun 26', 31'	Report	9' T. Triantafyllidis

Platja de Torredembarra

=== Final Division B Standing ===
Rank	Team
1	France (will remain in Division A for 2014)
2	Greece
3	Hungary
4	Israel
5	Turkey
6	Czech Republic
7	Estonia
8	England

=== Total Goals ===
235 goals were scored, for an average of 7.34 goals per match.

== See also ==
- Beach soccer
