= 2015 Euro Beach Soccer League =

Tournament details
- Dates: 12 June – 23 August
- Teams: 20 (from 1 confederation)
- Venue: 3 (in 3 host cities)

Final positions
- Champions: Portugal (5th title)
- Runners-up: Ukraine
- Third place: Russia
- Fourth place: Spain

Tournament statistics
- Matches played: 62
- Goals scored: 519 (8.37 per match)
- Top scorer: (Switzerland) Dejan Stankovic (13)
- Best player: (Ukraine) Igor Borsuk
- Best goalkeeper: (Portugal) Elinton Andrade

The 2015 Euro Beach Soccer League (EBSL) is an annual European competition in beach soccer. The competitions allows national teams to compete in beach soccer in a league format over the summer months. Each season ends with a Superfinal, deciding the competition winner.

This season, there were twelve teams each participating in two divisions in each stage that faced each other in a round-robin system. Division A consisted of 11 teams from last season's Division A, plus Hungary who were promoted. Division B consisted of 8 of the lower ranked teams and new entries to the competition. Each division has its own regulations and competition format.

Due to the beach soccer event at the 2015 European Games (24–28 June) and the 2015 FIFA Beach Soccer World Cup (9–19 July) scheduled to take place right in the middle of the typical EBSL season of June to August, BSWW were forced to organise a shorter season than usual, featuring an abnormally low amount of regular season stages of fixtures (two, rather than the customary three or four). Consequently, whereas each Division A nation would usually take part in two stages, this season they only took part in one.

== Calendar ==
Dates	City	Country	Stage
12–14 June	Moscow	Russia	Stage 1
7–9 August	Siófok	Hungary	Stage 2
20–23 August	Pärnu	Estonia	Superfinal and Promotion Final

All times are CEST (UTC+02:00).

== Teams ==
2015 Euro Beach Soccer League Divisions
DIVISION A			DIVISION B	
Belarus	Hungary	Russia	Andorra	Moldova
France	Italy	Spain	Azerbaijan	Norway
Germany	Poland	Switzerland	Czech Republic	Romania
Greece	Portugal	Ukraine	England	Turkey

== Stage 1 (Moscow, 12–14 June) ==
Stage winners

=== Division A ===
==== Group 1 ====
Team	Pld	W	W+	WP	L	GF	GA	+/-	Pts
Russia	3	1	0	1	1	10	7	+3	4
France	3	1	0	0	2	5	7	–2	3
Belarus	3	1	0	0	2	9	9	0	3
Poland	3	0	1	1	1	9	10	–1	3

==== Group 2 ====
Team	Pld	W	W+	WP	L	GF	GA	+/-	Pts
Italy	3	3	0	0	0	12	7	+5	9
Portugal	3	2	0	0	1	13	8	+5	6
Germany	3	1	0	0	2	10	16	–6	3
Greece	3	0	0	0	3	7	11	–4	0

=== Schedule and results ===
12 June 2015
15:45

Italy	4 – 2	Germany
	Report

12 June 2015
17:00

Belarus	2 – 1	France
	Report

12 June 2015
18:15

Greece	1 – 2	Portugal
	Report

12 June 2015
19:30

Poland	3 – 3 (a.e.t.)	Russia
	Report
Penalties
	6 – 5

13 June 2015
15:45

Italy	2 – 0	Greece
	Report

13 June 2015
17:00

Belarus	4 – 5 (a.e.t.)	Poland
	Report

13 June 2015
18:15

Portugal	6 – 1	Germany
	Report

13 June 2015
19:30

Russia	4 – 1	France
	Report

14 June 2015
12:30

Germany	7 – 6	Greece
	Report

14 June 2015
13:45

France	3 – 1	Poland
	Report

14 June 2015
15:00

Portugal	5 – 6	Italy
	Report

14 June 2015
16:15

Russia	3 – 3 (a.e.t.)	Belarus
	Report
Penalties
	3 – 2

=== Individual Awards ===
MVP: (Italy) Gabriele Gori
Top scorer: (Italy) Gabriele Gori, (Belarus) Ihar Bryshtel, (Portugal) Zé Maria (5 goals)
Best goalkeeper: (Russia) Ivan Ostrovsky

== Stage 2 (Siófok, 7–9 August) ==
Stage winners (Div. A)
Stage winners (Div. B)

=== Division A ===
Team	Pld	W	W+	WP	L	GF	GA	+/-	Pts
Switzerland	3	2	1	0	0	23	12	+11	8
Ukraine	3	1	1	0	1	17	15	+2	5
Spain	3	1	0	0	2	15	20	–5	3
Hungary	3	0	0	0	3	13	21	–8	0

=== Schedule and results ===
7 August 2015
17:15

Spain	5 – 6 (a.e.t.)	Switzerland
	Report

7 August 2015
18:30

Ukraine	5 – 4 (a.e.t.)	Hungary
	Report

8 August 2015
17:15

Spain	4 – 9	Ukraine
	Report

8 August 2015
18:30

Switzerland	10 – 4	Hungary
	Report

9 August 2015
15:45

Switzerland	7 – 3	Ukraine
	Report

9 August 2015
17:00

Hungary	5 – 6	Spain
	Report

=== Division B ===
==== Group 1 ====
Team	Pld	W	W+	WP	L	GF	GA	+/-	Pts
Azerbaijan	3	2	1	0	0	16	7	+9	8
Romania	3	1	0	1	1	10	11	–1	4
England	3	1	0	0	2	12	14	–2	3
Moldova	3	0	0	0	3	6	12	–6	0

==== Group 2 ====
Team	Pld	W	W+	WP	L	GF	GA	+/-	Pts
Turkey	3	3	0	0	0	18	5	+13	9
Norway	3	2	0	0	1	16	13	+3	6
Czech Republic	3	1	0	0	2	13	18	–5	3
Andorra	3	0	0	0	3	3	14	–11	0

=== Schedule and results ===
7 August 2015
12:15

Czech Republic	6 – 9	Norway
	Report

7 August 2015
13:30

England	5 – 3	Moldova
	Report

7 August 2015
14:45

Andorra	0 – 5	Turkey
	Report

7 August 2015
16:00

Romania	2 – 6	Azerbaijan
	Report

8 August 2015
12:15

Czech Republic	5 – 3	Andorra
	Report

8 August 2015
13:30

England	2 – 5	Romania
	Report

8 August 2015
14:45

Turkey	7 – 3	Norway
	Report

8 August 2015
16:00

Azerbaijan	4 – 0	Moldova
	Report

9 August 2015
10:45

Norway	4 – 0	Andorra
	Report

9 August 2015
12:00

Moldova	3 – 3 (a.e.t.)	Romania
	Report
Penalties
	2 – 3

9 August 2015
13:15

Turkey	6 – 2	Czech Republic
	Report

9 August 2015
14:30

Azerbaijan	6 – 5 (a.e.t.)	England
	Report

=== Individual Awards ===
MVP: (Switzerland) Noël Ott
Top scorer: (Switzerland) Dejan Stankovic (10 goals)
Best goalkeeper: (Ukraine) Volodymyr Hladchenko

== Cumulative standings ==
The eight best placed teams in Division A qualified for the Superfinal. The qualifiers for the Promotion Final were the eight best placed teams in Division B and the last placed team in Division A.

Team advanced to Superfinal
Team advanced to Promotional Final

Ranking & tie-breaking criteria: 1. Points earned 2. Highest stage placement 3. Goal difference 4. Goals scored.

=== Division A ===
Pos	Team	Pld	W	W+	WP	L	GF	GA	+/-	Pts
1	Italy	3	3	0	0	0	12	7	+5	9
2	Switzerland	3	2	1	0	0	23	12	+11	8
3	Portugal	3	2	0	0	1	13	8	+5	6
4	Ukraine	3	1	1	0	1	17	15	+2	5
5	Russia	3	1	0	1	1	10	7	+3	4
6	France	3	1	0	0	2	5	7	–2	3
7	Belarus	3	1	0	0	2	9	9	0	3
8	Spain	3	1	0	0	2	15	20	–5	3
9	Germany	3	1	0	0	2	10	16	–6	3
10	Poland	3	0	1	1	1	9	10	–1	3
11	Greece	3	0	0	0	3	7	11	–4	0
12	Hungary	3	0	0	0	3	13	21	–8	0

=== Division B ===
Pos	Team	Pld	W	W+	WP	L	GF	GA	+/-	Pts
1	Turkey	3	3	0	0	0	18	5	+13	9
2	Azerbaijan	3	2	1	0	0	16	7	+9	8
3	Norway	3	2	0	0	1	16	13	+3	6
4	Romania	3	1	0	1	1	10	11	–1	4
5	England	3	1	0	0	2	12	14	–2	3
6	Czech Republic	3	1	0	0	2	13	18	–5	3
7	Moldova	3	0	0	0	3	6	12	–6	0
8	Andorra	3	0	0	0	3	3	14	–11	0

Since Division A teams only participated in one stage this season, tie-breaking criteria were different than usual for the top tier. Instead of teams tied on points then ranked on goal difference, teams tied were then ranked based on who placed the highest in the group of the stage they played in (as is usual in Division B). If the two teams both finished in the same position in their respective groups, only then was goal difference used.

Hence, of the five teams on three points, France finished highest having finished 2nd in stage one, Poland last having finished 4th in stage one. Meanwhile the other three all finished in 3rd place in their respective stage groups so were then ranked by goal difference.

== Finals (Pärnu, 20–23 August) ==
=== Promotional Final (Division B) ===
==== Teams ====
- Azerbaijan
- Czech Republic
- England
- Estonia (automatic qualification as hosts)
- Hungary (worst-ranked team in Division A)
- Norway
- Romania
- Turkey

clinched Promotional Final

==== Group 1 Standings ====
Team	Pld	W	W+	WP	L	GF	GA	+/-	Pts
Estonia	3	2	0	1	0	17	14	+3	7
England	3	1	1	0	1	10	9	+1	5
Hungary	3	1	0	0	2	12	14	–2	3
Norway	3	0	0	0	3	12	14	–2	0

	(England)	(Estonia)	(Hungary)	(Norway)
England	–	3–5		3–4
Estonia		–	7–6	
Hungary	1–3		–	5–4
Norway		5–5		–

==== Group 2 Standings ====
Team	Pld	W	W+	WP	L	GF	GA	+/-	Pts
Romania	3	1	1	0	1	13	11	+2	5
Czech Republic	3	1	1	0	1	10	8	+2	5
Azerbaijan	3	0	0	1	2	13	15	–2	1
Turkey	3	0	0	1	2	7	9	–2	1

	(Azerbaijan)	(Czech Republic)	(Romania)	(Turkey)
Azerbaijan	–	4–5	5–6	
Czech Republic		–		2–0
Romania		4–3	–	
Turkey	4–4		3–3	–

==== Schedule and results ====
20 August 2015
10:15

Czech Republic	2 – 0	Turkey
	Report

20 August 2015
11:30

Azerbaijan	5 – 6 (a.e.t.)	Romania
	Report

20 August 2015
12:45

Hungary	1 – 3	England
	Report

20 August 2015
19:00

Norway	5 – 5	Estonia
	Report
Penalties
	1 – 3

21 August 2015
10:15

Azerbaijan	4 – 5 (a.e.t.)	Czech Republic
	Report

21 August 2015
11:30

Hungary	5 – 4	Norway
	Report

21 August 2015
12:45

Turkey	3 – 3 (a.e.t.)	Romania
	Report
Penalties
	4 – 3

21 August 2015
19:00

England	3 – 5	Estonia
	Report

22 August 2015
10:15

Turkey	4 – 4 (a.e.t.)	Azerbaijan
	Report
Penalties
	2 – 3

22 August 2015
11:30

Romania	4 – 3	Czech Republic
	Report

22 August 2015
12:45

Norway	3 – 4 (a.e.t.)	England
	Report

22 August 2015
19:00

Estonia	7 – 6	Hungary
	Report

==== Play-off results ====
===== Seventh-place Match =====
23 August 2015
10:15

Norway	4 – 9	Turkey
	Report

===== Fifth-place Match =====
23 August 2015
11:30

Hungary	4 – 2	Azerbaijan
	Report

===== Third-place Match =====
23 August 2015
15:15

England	2 – 2 (a.e.t.)	Czech Republic
	Report
Penalties
	2 – 3

===== Promotion Final =====
23 August 2015
17:45

Estonia	6 – 6	Romania
	Report
Penalties
	2 – 3

==== Final Division B Standing ====
Rank	Team	
1	Romania	Promoted Division A
2	Estonia	Stay Division B
3	Czech Republic	Stay Division B
4	England	Stay Division B
5	Hungary	Relegated Division B
6	Azerbaijan	Stay Division B
7	Turkey	Stay Division B
8	Norway	Stay Division B

=== Superfinal (Division A) ===
==== Teams ====
- Belarus
- Spain
- France
- Italy
- Portugal
- Russia
- Switzerland
- Ukraine

clinched Championship Final

==== Group 1 Standings ====
Team	Pld	W	W+	WP	L	GF	GA	+/-	Pts
Ukraine	3	2	0	0	1	17	16	+1	6
Spain	3	1	1	0	1	11	14	–3	5
Italy	3	1	0	1	1	16	12	+4	4
Belarus	3	0	0	0	3	11	13	–2	0

	(Belarus)	(Italy)	(Spain)	(Ukraine)
Belarus	–		3–4	
Italy	3–3	–		6–7
Spain		2–7	–	
Ukraine	6–5		4–5	–

==== Group 2 Standings ====
Team	Pld	W	W+	WP	L	GF	GA	+/-	Pts
Portugal	3	2	0	1	0	17	10	+7	7
Russia	3	2	0	0	1	14	8	+6	6
Switzerland	3	1	0	0	2	15	18	–3	3
France	3	0	0	0	3	4	14	–10	0

	(France)	(Portugal)	(Russia)	(Switzerland)
France	–			2–5
Portugal	6–2	–	3–3	
Russia	3–0		–	
Switzerland		5–8	5–8	–

==== Schedule and results ====
20 August 2015
14:00

Ukraine	6 – 5	Belarus
Zborovskiy 12', 26', 32'; Voitok 12'; Medvedy 21'; Borsuk 35'	Report	Brishtely 1'; Konstantinov 13'; Davidovitch 29'; Bokatch 32', 36'

20 August 2015
15:15

Spain	2 – 7	Italy
Pajón 10'; Llorenç 30'	Report	Marinai 2'; Di Palma 9'; Zurlo 21', 36'; Corosiniti 23'; Ramacciotti 29', 32'

20 August 2015
16:30

France	2 – 5	Switzerland
Basquaise 3'; Fisher 30'	Report	Denz 6'; Stanković 22', 24', 31', 35'

20 August 2015
17:45

Portugal	3 – 3 (a.e.t.)	Russia
Zé Maria 18'; Alan 18'; Madjer 32'	Report	Ilinskii 10'; Krasheninnikov 19', 34'
Penalties
Coimbra (penalty scored); Madjer (penalty scored); Jordan (penalty scored)	3 – 2	(penalty scored) Leonov; (penalty scored) Paporotnyi; (penalty missed) Krasheninnikov

21 August 2015
14:00

Italy	3 – 3 (a.e.t.)	Belarus
Gori 5'; Palmacci 35'; Ramacciotti 36'	Report	Bokach 3'; Bryshtsel 7' (pen.); Kanstantsinau 23'
Penalties
Ramacciotti (penalty scored); Marinai (penalty scored); Zurlo (penalty scored)	3 – 1	(penalty missed) Bryshtsel; (penalty scored) Kanstantsinau

21 August 2015
15:15

Ukraine	4 – 5	Spain
Medved 8', 18'; Zborovsky 27'; Borsu 33'	Report	Ezequiel 5' (pen.), 31'; Llorenç 17'; Guisado 19'; Eduard 25'

21 August 2015
16:30

Switzerland	5 – 8	Russia
Stanković 3', 16', 27', 27'; Spaccarotella 30'	Report	Makarov 1', 36'; Peremitin 3'; Paporotnyi 4', 32'; Shaykov 5', 15', 20'

21 August 2015
17:45

Portugal	6 – 2	France
Belchior 9', 13'; Leo Martins 23'; Madjer 27'; Bê Martins 30' (pen.); B. Novo 30'	Report	Barbotti 3', 7'

22 August 2015
14:00

Italy	6 – 7	Ukraine
Ramacciotti 2'; Palmacci 13'; Marinai 15'; Di Palma 17' (pen.); A. Borsuk 19' (o.g.); Gori 20'	Report	Di Palma 5' (o.g.); Gladchenko 5'; A. Borsuk 11', 26'; Korniichuk 21' (pen.), 34'; I. Borsuk 28'

22 August 2015
15:15

Belarus	3 – 4 (a.e.t.)	Spain
Bryshtsel 7', 21'; Mirohovich 20'	Report	Merida 8'; Pajón 24'; Llorenç 28'; Pablo 38'

22 August 2015
16:30

Switzerland	5 – 8	Portugal
Wittlin 7', 29'; Stanković 10'; Denz 26'; Mo 30'	Report	Torres 1'; Jordan 7'; Belchior 8', 32'; Madjer 10'; Alan 12'; Zé Maria 16', 34'

22 August 2015
17:45

Russia	3 – 0	France
Peremitin 5'; Shaykov 7'; Paporotnyi 29'	Report

==== Play-off results ====
===== Seventh-place Match =====
23 August 2015
12:45

Belarus	2 – 3	France
Bryshtsel 28', 36'	Report	Marques 7'; Barbotti 16' (pen.); Tillet 30'

===== Fifth-place Match =====
23 August 2015
14:00

Italy	15 – 10	Switzerland
Corosiniti 5', 28', 35'; Palazollo 9', 25'; Platania 11', 26' (pen.), 36'; Marucci 13'; Gori 14', 16' (pen.), 23', 33'; Ramacciotti 26'; Zurlo 31'	Report	Stanković 8', 14', 23', 29'; Ott 16', 24', 29'; Mo 18'; Denz 26'; Shirinzi 34'

===== Third-place Match =====
23 August 2015
16:30

Spain	3 – 6	Russia
Merida 8'; Makarov 13' (o.g.); Antonio 21'	Report	Paporotnyi 8'; Krasheninnikov 12'; Makarov 16' (pen.); Romanov 19', 29'; Shaykov 33'

===== Championship final Match =====
23 August 2015
19:00

Ukraine	4 – 5	Portugal
Panteleichuk 5'; A. Borsuk 13' (pen.), 36' (pen.); I. Borsuk 24'	Report	Zé Maria 12', 36', 36'; Belchior 25'; Bê Martins 28'

==== Individual Awards ====
- MVP: (Ukraine) Igor Borsuk
- Top Scorer: (Switzerland) Dejan Stankovic (13 goals)
- Best Goalkeeper: (Portugal) Elinton Andrade

==== Final Division A Standing ====
Rank	Team
1	Portugal
2	Ukraine
3	Russia
4	Spain
5	Italy
6	Switzerland
7	France
8	Belarus

== Sources ==
- Group distribution for EBSL 2015 announced. Beach Soccer Worldwide.
