= Greece national beach soccer team =

Greek international sports team

Greece
- Nickname(s): Ethniki (National); Galanolefki (Blue-white)
- Association: Hellenic Football Federation
- Confederation: UEFA (Europe)
- Head coach: Stefanos Soilemes
- Most caps: Theophilos Triantafyllidis (59)
- Top scorer: Theophilos Triantafyllidis (30)
- FIFA code: GRE
- BSWW ranking: 50 ▲3 (1 June 2026)
First colours	Second colours

Biggest win
- Greece 9–1 Andorra (Lignano Sabbiadoro, Italy; 10 July 2009); Greece 9–1 Algeria (Pescara, Italy; 5 June 2015)

Biggest defeat
- Russia 9–0 Greece (Moscow, Russia; 28 July 2017)

The Greece national beach soccer team represents Greece in international beach soccer competitions and is controlled by the HFF, the governing body for football in Greece.

== Results and fixtures ==
The following is a list of match results in the last 12 months, as well as any future matches that have been scheduled.

Legend

Win Draw Lose Fixture

=== 2023 ===
9 September 2023 2023 Mediterranean Beach Games	France	8–1	Greece	Heraklion, Greece
12:00 UTC+3	Barbotti 19'; Gharbi 28'; Constant 29'; Belhomme 30', 36'; Drouillet 34'; Bru 35'; Guerin 36'	Report	Skourtas 10'	Stadium: Karteros Beach Sports Center; Referee: Wilson Castanheira (Portugal)

10 September 2023 2023 Mediterranean Beach Games	Greece	3–11	Morocco	Heraklion, Greece
16:00 UTC+3	Katsoulis 11'; Lympousis 21', 34'	Report	Bessak 1', 18'; Abagli 6'; El Kraichly 10', 36'; Elabbassi 11'; Ghailani 20'; Oubahri 25', 30'; Tais 34'; Zahraoui 36'	Stadium: Karteros Beach Sports Center; Referee: Wilson Castanheira (Portugal)

11 September 2023 2023 Mediterranean Beach Games	Greece	1–5	Spain	Heraklion, Greece
17:30 UTC+3	Domingo 17' (o.g.)	Report	Domingo 10'; Antonio 18'; Arias 20'; Camacho 31'; Joselito 34'	Stadium: Karteros Beach Sports Center; Referee: Hany Eleraky (Egypt)

19 September 2023 2023 Euro Beach Soccer League – Division A – Group A	Greece	2–5	Italy	Alghero, Italy
19:00 UTC+3	Mikelatos 18', 32'	Report	Giordani 9'; Genovali 10'; Zurlo 12'; Remedi 23', 34'	Stadium: Main pitch Referee: Malte Gerhardt (Germany)

20 September 2023 2023 Euro Beach Soccer League – Division A – Group A	Belarus	7–2	Greece	Alghero, Italy
12:30 UTC+3	Chaikouski 2'; Hapon 7', 17'; Bryshtsel 11', 35'; Bokach 14'	Report	Mikelatos 4'; Katsoulis 11'	Stadium: Main pitch Referee: Dario Minder (Switzerland)

21 September 2023 2023 Euro Beach Soccer League – Division A – Group A	Moldova	5–3	Greece	Alghero, Italy
16:30 UTC+3	Cojocari 3'; Istrati 4'; Turta 19'; Garanovschi 23'; Graur 36'	Report	Mikelatos 27', 35'; Skourtas 29'	Stadium: Pitch 2 Referee: Mehdi Sayoud (Belgium)

22 September 2023 2023 Euro Beach Soccer League – Division A – Relegation play-offs	Greece	2–2 (a.e.t.) (5–4 p)	Moldova	Alghero, Italy
16:30 UTC+3	Lympousis 20'; Mikelatos 28'	Report	Ignat 3', 12'	Stadium: Pitch 2 Referee: Moreno Francesco Longo (Italy)

23 September 2023 2023 Euro Beach Soccer League – Division A – Relegation play-offs	Azerbaijan	6–3	Greece	Alghero, Italy
16:30 UTC+3	Ramil 13', 24', 36'; Nazarov 17', 29'; Mammadov 25'	Report	Mikelatos 7'; Skourtas 19'; Karakasis 29'	Stadium: Pitch 2 Referee: Raffaele Delvecchio (Italy)

24 September 2023 2023 Euro Beach Soccer League – Division A – Relegation play-offs	France	3–2	Greece	Alghero, Italy
	Bru 19'; Constant 21'; Guerin 23'	Report	Katsoulis 21'; Stratis 24'	Stadium: Main Pitch; Referee: Vladimir Tashkov (Bulgaria)

=== 2024 ===
3 July 2024 2024 Euro Beach Soccer League – Division B	Norway	0–4	Greece	Pisa, Italy
11:00 UTC+03:00		Report	Katsoulis 21'; Mikelatos 24'; Lympousis 28'; Skourtas 31'	Stadium: Italian Olympic Center; Referee: Sergio Romero (Switzerland)

6 July 2024 2024 Euro Beach Soccer League – Division B	Greece	7–4	Malta	Pisa, Italy
11:00 UTC+03:00	Mikelatos 6', 27'; Katsoulis 8'; Karakasis 11'; Tsekouras 20'; Skourtas 25'; Tsitsaris 27'	Report	Muscat 6'; Agius 16'; Nanapere 27' (pen.); Bray 32'	Stadium: Italian Olympic Center; Referee: Saverio Bottalico (Italy)

== Current squad ==
As of 7 July 2024

The following players were named in the squad for the 2024 Euro Beach Soccer League, to be played 2 to 7 July 2024.

No.	Pos.	Player	Date of birth (age)	Caps	Goals	Club
1	GK	Lamion Letso	22 April 1992 (age 34)	15	0	(Hellenic Football Federation) AO Kefallinia
2	DF	Michail Lympousis	14 January 1993 (age 33)	30	7	(Hellenic Football Federation) AO Atlas
3	DF	Dimitrios Paloumpis	25 February 2003 (age 23)	24	1	(Hellenic Football Federation) Napoli Patron
4	DF	Theodoros Karmokolias	19 November 1999 (age 26)	9	0	(Hellenic Football Federation) Panachaiki
5	DF	Georgios Karakasis	27 August 1987 (age 38)	30	5	(Hellenic Football Federation) AO Kefallinia
6	FW	Konstantinos Koukovinis	4 March 1997 (age 29)	20	2	(Hellenic Football Federation) AO Kefallinia
7	FW	Andreas Katsoulis	25 August 1993 (age 32)	30	26	(Hellenic Football Federation) AO Kefallinia
8	FW	Dimitrios Alexandros Mikelatos	1 February 1988 (age 38)	25	19	(Hellenic Football Federation) Panachaiki
9	FW	Konstantinos Tsitsaris	18 August 1993 (age 32)	28	14	(Hellenic Football Federation) AO Atlas
10	FW	Theofilos Triantafyllidis (captain)	26 October 1974 (age 51)	36	3	(Hellenic Football Federation) AO Kefallinia
11	FW	Ioannis Skourtas	20 December 2003 (age 22)	23	11	(Hellenic Football Federation) Napoli Patron
12	GK	Adam Tsekouras	6 September 2002 (age 23)	27	1	(Hellenic Football Federation) Panachaiki

== Competitive record ==
=== FIFA Beach Soccer World Cup ===
FIFA World Cup record										Qualification (UEFA) record								
Year	Round	Pos	Pld	W	W+	L	GF	GA	GD	Round	Pos	Pld	W	W+	L	GF	GA	GD
(Brazil) 2005	did not qualify									No qualification matches								
(Brazil) 2006	did not qualify									No qualification matches								
(Brazil) 2007	did not qualify									No qualification matches								
(France) 2008	did not qualify									Quarterfinals	–	5	2	0	3	13	17	-4
(United Arab Emirates) 2009	did not qualify									Group stage	–	2	0	0	2	8	12	-6
(Italy) 2011	did not qualify									Round of 16	–	4	2	0	2	22	21	+1
(French Polynesia) 2013	did not qualify									Round of 16	–	4	1	0	3	16	19	-3
(Portugal) 2015	did not qualify									Second stage	16th	8	1	0	7	27	38	-11
(The Bahamas) 2017	did not qualify									Second stage	14th	8	3	0	5	27	37	-10
(Paraguay) 2019	did not enter									did not enter								
(Russia) 2021	did not enter									did not enter								
(United Arab Emirates) 2023	did not qualify									Second stage	16th	7	1	0	6	22	32	-10
(Seychelles) 2025	did not enter									did not enter								
TBD 2027	to be determined									To be determined								
Total	0 titles	–	–	–	–	–	–	–	–	0 titles	3/6	38	10	0	28	135	176	-40

=== Euro Beach Soccer League ===
EBSL record
Year	Round	Pos	Pld	W	W+	L	GF	GA	GD
1998	did not enter								
1999	did not enter								
2000	did not enter								
(Monaco) 2001	did not enter								
(Monaco) 2002	did not enter								
(Belgium) 2003	did not enter								
(Monaco) 2004	Division C Quarterfinals	5th	3	2	0	1	12	8	+4
(France) 2005	Division B Quarterfinals	7th	3	1	0	2	12	12	0
(France) 2006	Division A	–	20	6	0	14	66	97	-31
(France) 2007	Preliminary round	–	2	0	0	2	2	7	-5
(Portugal) 2008	Stage 1 Quarterfinals	–	3	1	0	2	12	17	-5
(Portugal) 2009	Promotion final	2nd	5	3	0	2	26	12	+14
(Portugal) 2010	Stage 1 Division B	–	2	0	0	2	10	16	-6
(Russia) 2011	Stage 4 Division B	–	2	1	0	1	7	6	+1
(Netherlands) 2012	Stage 2 Division B	–	3	1	0	2	9	10	-1
(Spain) 2013	Promotion final	2nd	7	4	1	2	25	20	+5
(Spain) 2014	Stage 2 & 3 Division A	–	6	1	1	4	14	31	-17
(Estonia) 2015	Stage 1 Division A	–	3	0	0	3	7	11	-4
(Italy) 2016	Stage 1 & 2 Division A	–	6	0	0	6	14	35	-21
(Italy) 2017	Promotion final	4th	10	2	0	8	24	50	-26
(Italy) 2018	Stage 3 Division B	–	3	1	0	2	10	12	-2
(Portugal) 2019	Promotion final	4th	7	5	0	2	27	16	+11
(Portugal) 2020	Cancelled due to the COVID-19 pandemic								
(Portugal) 2021	Promotion final	4th	9	5	0	4	31	29	+2
(Italy) 2022	Promotion final	3rd	5	3	0	2	17	12	+5
(Italy) 2023	Group Stage Division A	15th	6	1	0	5	14	28	-14
(Italy) 2024	Stage 1 Division B	1st	2	2	0	0	11	4	+7
(Italy) 2025	did not enter								
(Italy) 2026	did not enter								
TBD 2027	to be determined								
Total	0 titles	10/20	107	39	2	66	350	433	-83

=== Beach Soccer at the Mediterranean Beach Games ===
Mediterranean Beach Games record
Year	Round	Pos	Pld	W	W+	L	GF	GA	GD
(Italy) 2015	Group stage	9th	5	2	1	2	21	16	+5
(Greece) 2019	Group stage	–	3	1	0	2	13	13	0
(Greece) 2023	Group stage	7th	3	0	0	3	5	24	-19
(Portugal) 2027	to be determined								
Total	0 titles	0/2	11	3	1	7	39	53	-14
