= Andorra national beach soccer team =

National sports team

Andorra
- Nickname: Tricolors (The Tricolours)
- Association: Andorran Football Federation (Federació Andorrana de Futbol)
- Confederation: UEFA (Europe)
- Head coach: Xavier de la Rosa
- Captain: Eric Flinch
- FIFA code: AND
- BSWW ranking: 72 (Feb. '17)
First colours
Second colours

First international
- Ukraine 6–2 Andorra (Benidorm, Spain; 11 May 2008)

Biggest win
- Andorra 6–5 Norway (Scheveningen, Netherlands; 25 July 2010)

Biggest defeat
- Hungary 14–1 Andorra (Siofok, Hungary; 11 August 2017)

World Cup
- Appearances: 0
- Best result: none

The Andorra national beach soccer team represents Andorra in international beach soccer competitions and is controlled by the Federació Andorrana de Futbol (Andorran Football Federation), the governing body for football in Andorra.

Andorra made their debut in 2008 at the World Cup qualifiers. Despite being a small nation, Andorra have been a regular competitor on the international circuit, competing in every season of the Euro Beach Soccer League since their debut (bar 2010). However the team has only managed to record one win from around 30 games played in their history so far, versus Norway in a 2010 exhibition tournament. Andorra compete in Division B of the EBSL.

== Current squad ==
Correct as of July 2016

Note: Flags indicate national team as defined under FIFA eligibility rules; some limited exceptions apply. Players may hold more than one non-FIFA nationality.

| No. | Pos. | Nation | Player |
|---|---|---|---|
| 1 | GK | AND | Andre Ferreira |
| 4 | MF | AND | Adria Caminal |
| 5 | FW | AND | Arnau Rodriguez |
| 6 | DF | AND | Jordi Alaez |
| 7 | FW | AND | Àlex Martínez |

| No. | Pos. | Nation | Player |
|---|---|---|---|
| 8 | MF | AND | Oscar Neira |
| 9 | MF | AND | Alex Villagrasa |
| 10 | DF | AND | Gabriel Fernandez |
| 11 | MF | AND | Aleix Viladot |
| 15 | GK | AND | Eric Flinch (captain) |

Coach: Xavier de la Rosa
Technical Assistant: Oscar Brau
Head Delegation: Joan Aguilera

== Achievements ==
- Euro Beach Soccer League Best: 11th place (of 12), Division B
  - 2011, 2013

== Competitive record ==
=== Euro Beach Soccer League ===
| Year | Division | Teams in Div. | Result | Superfinal? |
|---|---|---|---|---|
| 1998 – 2007 | did not enter | | | |
| 2008 | — | 17 | 17th place | No |
| 2009 | B | 10 | 10th place | No |
| 2010 | did not enter | | | |
| 2011 | B | 12 | 10th place | No |
| 2012 | B | 12 | 12th place | No |
| 2013 | B | 12 | 12th place | No |
| 2014 | B | 12 | 12th place | No |
| 2015 | B | 8 | 8th place | No |
| 2016 | B | 14 | 14th place | No |
| 2017 | B | 15 | 15th place | No |
| 2018 | B | 15 | 15th place | No |
| 2019 | did not enter | | | |
| 2020 | Season cancelled | | | |
| 2021 | did not enter | | | |
| 2022 | did not enter | | | |
| 2023 | did not enter | | | |
| 2024 | did not enter | | | |
| 2025 | did not enter | | | |

=== FIFA Beach Soccer World Cup qualification (UEFA) ===
| Year | Pos | Round | Pld | W | W+ | L | GF | GA | GD |
|---|---|---|---|---|---|---|---|---|---|
| (Spain) 2008 | T17th | Group Stage | 3 | 0 | 0 | 3 | 9 | 17 | –8 |
| (Spain) 2009 | T17th | Group Stage | 2 | 0 | 0 | 2 | 3 | 16 | –13 |
| (Italy) 2011 | T17th | Group Stage | 3 | 0 | 0 | 3 | 4 | 23 | –19 |
| (Russia) 2013 | did not enter | | | | | | | | |
| (Italy) 2015 | did not enter | | | | | | | | |
| (Italy) 2017 | did not enter | | | | | | | | |
| (Russia) 2019 | did not enter | | | | | | | | |
| (Portugal) 2021 | did not enter | | | | | | | | |
| (Azerbaijan) 2023 | did not enter | | | | | | | | |
| (Spain) 2025 | did not enter | | | | | | | | |
| Total | 0 titles | 3/10 | 8 | 0 | 0 | 8 | 16 | 56 | –40 |
