= Beach soccer at the 2023 Mediterranean Beach Games =

Tournament details
- Host country: Greece
- Dates: 9–12 September
- Teams: 7 (from 2 confederations)
- Venue(s): Karteros Beach Center, Heraklion

Final positions
- Champions: Spain (1st title)
- Runners-up: Portugal
- Third place: Morocco
- Fourth place: Egypt

Tournament statistics
- Matches played: 12
- Goals scored: 82 (6.83 per match)
- Top scorer(s): (Italy) Marco Giordani (5 goals)

The beach soccer tournament at the 2023 Mediterranean Beach Games was held from 9 to 12 September at the Karteros Beach Center, Heraklion.

== Medalists ==
Event	Gold	Silver	Bronze
Men	Spain; Francisco Donaire; Antonio Rigaud; José Sánchez; José Arias; David Ardil; Soleiman Batis; Domingo Cabrera; Pedro García; Miguel Santiso; Antonio Mayor; Chiky Ardil; Francisco Camacho	Portugal; Rui Coimbra; André Lourenço; Bruno Torres; Jordan Santos; Rodrigo Pinhal; Rubén Brilhante; Bê Martins; Léo Martins; Elinton Andrade; Miguel Pintado; Bernardo Lopes; Ruben Regufe	Morocco; Yassir Abada; Adnane Hakkar; Mohamed Ghailani; Mustapha Tais; Adnan Oubahri; Badr El Kraichly; Souhail Bessak; Amine El Bidouri; Reda Zahraoui; Ibrahim Abagli; Anouar Elabbassi; M'Hamed Manar

== Group stage ==
All times are local (UTC+3).

=== Group A ===
Pos	Team	Pld	W	W+	WP	L	GF	GA	GD	Pts	Qualification
1	Spain	3	3	0	0	0	14	4	+10	9	Gold medal match
2	Morocco	3	2	0	0	1	15	10	+5	6	Bronze medal match
3	France	3	1	0	0	2	9	5	+4	3	Fifth place match
4	Greece (H)	3	0	0	0	3	5	24	−19	0	

Source: Heraklion 23
(H) Host
9 September 2023
10:30

Morocco	2–7	Spain
	Report

Karteros Beach Center – Court 2
Referee: Moreno Longo (Italy)
9 September 2023
12:00

France	8–1	Greece
	Report

Karteros Beach Center – Court 2
Referee: Wilson Soares (Portugal)

10 September 2023
14:30

Spain	2–1	France
	Report

Karteros Beach Center – Court 2
Referee: Sérgio Soares (Portugal)
10 September 2023
16:00

Greece	3–11	Morocco
	Report

Karteros Beach Center – Court 2
Referee: Wilson Soares (Portugal)

11 September 2023
14:30

Morocco	2–0	France
	Report

Karteros Beach Center – Court 2
Referee: Wilson Soares (Portugal)
11 September 2023
17:30

Greece	1–5	Spain
	Report

Karteros Beach Center – Court 2
Referee: Hany El-Eraky (Egypt)

=== Group B ===
Pos	Team	Pld	W	W+	WP	L	GF	GA	GD	Pts	Qualification
1	Portugal	2	0	1	1	0	9	7	+2	3 (Note: Portugal 5–3 (a.e.t.) Egypt)	Gold medal match
2	Egypt	2	1	0	0	1	6	7	−1	3	Bronze medal match
3	Italy	2	0	0	0	2	6	7	−1	0	Fifth place match

Source: Heraklion 23
Notes:
9 September 2023
09:00

Egypt	3–2	Italy
	Report

Karteros Beach Center – Court 2
Referee: Patricia Gómez (Spain)

10 September 2023
17:30

Portugal	5–3 (a.e.t.)	Egypt
	Report

Karteros Beach Center – Court 2
Referee: Matthieu Dor (France)

11 September 2023
16:00

Portugal	4–4 (a.e.t.)	Italy
	Report
Penalties
	5–4

Karteros Beach Center – Court 2
Referee: José Pardeiro (Spain)

== Final round ==
=== Fifth place match ===
12 September 2023
14:30

France	3–4	Italy
	Report

Karteros Beach Center – Court 1
Referee: Hany El-Eraky (Egypt)

=== Bronze medal match ===
12 September 2023
16:00

Morocco	5–3	Egypt
	Report

Karteros Beach Center – Court 1
Referee: Sérgio Soares (Portugal)

=== Gold medal match ===
12 September 2023
20:30

Spain	3–0	Portugal
	Report

Karteros Beach Center – Court 1
Referee: Moreno Longo (Italy)

== Final standings ==
Rank	Team
1st place, gold medalist(s)	Spain
2nd place, silver medalist(s)	Portugal
3rd place, bronze medalist(s)	Morocco
4	Egypt
5	Italy
6	France
7	Greece
