= Aleix Viladot =

Andorran footballer (born 1997)

Personal information
- Full name: Aleix Viladot Caramés
- Date of birth: June 26, 1997 (age 29)
- Place of birth: Encamp, Andorra
- Height: 1.72 m (5 ft 8 in)
- Position: Defender

Team information
- Current team: Penya Encarnada

Youth career
- –2016: FC Andorra

College career
Years	Team	Apps	(Gls)
2018–2020	Marshalltown Tigers	33	(4)
2020–2021	Texas–Rio Grande Valley Vaqueros	6	(0)

Senior career*
Years	Team	Apps	(Gls)
2016–2018	FC Andorra		
2019	Lakeland Tropics	3	(0)
2021–2023	Arnedo	4	(0)
2023	Penya Encarnada	10	(0)
2023–2024	Ordino	12	(0)
2024–	Penya Encarnada	0	(0)

International career^{‡}
2013	Andorra U17	3	(0)
2014–2015	Andorra U19	6	(0)
2015–2018	Andorra U21	13	(0)
2022–	Andorra	1	(0)
- * Club domestic league appearances and goals as of 27 May 2024 ‡ National team caps and goals as of 15 October 2023

Aleix Viladot Caramés (born 26 June 1997) is an Andorran footballer who plays as a defender for Penya Encarnada and the Andorra national team.

== Career ==
Viladot started his career with Andorran side FC Andorra. In 2018, he joined Marshalltown Community College Tigers in the United States. In 2019, Viladot signed for American club Florida Tropics. In 2020, he joined Texas–Rio Grande Valley Vaqueros in the United States. In 2021, he signed for Spanish team Arnedo.
