= Frank van der Geest =

Dutch footballer

Personal information
- Full name: Franciscus Wilhelmus Adrianus van der Geest
- Date of birth: 30 April 1973 (age 53)
- Place of birth: Beverwijk, Netherlands
- Height: 1.93 m (6 ft 4 in)
- Position: Goalkeeper

Senior career*
Years	Team	Apps	(Gls)
1993–1995	AZ	3	(0)
1995–1997	Sparta	2	(0)
1997–2000	Heracles	57	(0)
2000–2002	Darlington	2	(0)
- ADO '20
2004–2006	Volendam	48	(0)
2007-2009	OSV Amsterdam		
2009-2010	ADO '20		
- * Club domestic league appearances and goals

Frank van der Geest (born 30 April 1973) is a Dutch retired footballer who played as a goalkeeper in the Eredivisie for Sparta Rotterdam, in the Eerste Divisie for AZ Alkmaar, Heracles Almelo and FC Volendam, and in the English Football League for Darlington. He also spent time with amateur club ADO '20.

== Beach soccer ==
He took up beach soccer, and was a member of the Netherlands national beach soccer team that played at the 2013 FIFA Beach Soccer World Cup in Tahiti.

In December 2025, it was reported van der Geest would leave Volendam as their goalkeeping coach.
