= Marian Măciucă =

Romanian beach soccer player

Maci
Personal information
- Full name: Marian Măciucă
- Date of birth: December 31, 1981 (age 44)
- Place of birth: Constanța, Romania
- Position: Forward

Team information
- Current team: City Sankt Petersburg

Senior career*
Years	Team	Apps	(Gls)
2010	Sport Club Rosh-HaAyin		
2011	Lokomotiv Moscow		
2012–	City Sankt Petersburg		

International career
- Romania
- * Club domestic league appearances and goals

Marian Măciucă better known as Maci (born 31 December 1981) is a Romanian beach soccer player. He is known for his acrobatic finishes such as volleys, over-head kicks and bicycle kicks as well as his extravagant goal celebrations.

Maci competed in the 2011 Mundialito de Clubes with Lokomotiv Moscow, finishing fourth and scoring six goals.

== Honours ==
=== National team ===
- Romania
  - Euro Beach Soccer League Superfinal fourth place: 2011, 2012
  - Euro Beach Soccer League Superfinal sixth place: 2010
  - Euro Beach Soccer League Italian Event runner-up: 2011
  - Euro Beach Soccer League German Event runner-up: 2012
  - Euro Beach Soccer League German Event third place: 2011
  - Euro Beach Soccer League Dutch Event third place: 2010
  - Euro Beach Soccer League Russian Event third place: 2010

=== Club ===
- Lokomotiv Moscow
  - Mundialito de Clubes fourth place: 2011

=== Individual ===
- Romania
  - Euro Beach Soccer League Italian Event MVP: 2011
- Lokomotiv Moscow
  - Mundialito de Clubes sixth best scorer: 2011
