= 1998 Euro Beach Soccer League =

Tournament details
- Dates: 6 June – 20 September
- Teams: 7 (from 1 confederation)
- Venue(s): 7 (in 7 host cities)

Final positions
- Champions: Germany (1st title)
- Runners-up: Italy
- Third place: Portugal
- Fourth place: Spain

Tournament statistics
- Matches played: 28
- Goals scored: 264 (9.43 per match)
- Top scorer(s): (Spain) Amarelle (24 goals)
- Best player(s): (Spain) Amarelle

The first EBSL logo was introduced for the league's inaugural season in 1998. It was used as the league's logo throughout the European Pro Beach Soccer League named-era, its last use being in 2003.

The 1998 Euro Beach Soccer League was the first edition of the Euro Beach Soccer League (EBSL), the premier beach soccer competition contested between men's European national teams, originally known as the European Pro Beach Soccer League at the time. The competition was organised by Beach Soccer Company (BSC), the precursors to Beach Soccer Worldwide (BSWW) who took over organisation in 2001, between June 6 and September 20, 1998 in seven different nations across Europe.

The debut season was set up to be a competition with a presence throughout the summer to promote the newly founded sport in Europe through the consistency of a summer-long, professional-level spectacle.

Germany won on the final day of the season, remaining the only time they have won the league title or even finished inside the top four.

== Participating teams ==
Seven teams took part in the inaugural season.

- Spain
- Germany
- Switzerland
- France
- Yugoslavia
- Portugal
- Italy

== Organisation ==
Locations of the seven stages of the 1998 Euro Beach Soccer League

=== Format ===
Matches were split into seven rounds of fixtures known as stages, with one stage hosted in each of the seven countries participating as shown. Four teams took part in each, three joining the host nation of that particular stage, with each individual team taking part in four of the seven stages overall.

Each stage was played as a small knock-out tournament, with semi finals, the final and a third place decider being the fixtures throughout all seven rounds. Teams earned points for their successes per game and per stage which were then tallied up in the final league table.

The team who topped the table after all seven stages was crowned the winner of the league.

=== Point distribution ===
Points were allocated for the following achievements in each stage, contributing to the final points total in the league table.

| Scenario | Points earned |
|---|---|
| Win in normal time | 3 points |
| Win in overtime/penalties | 2 points |
| Stage winners | 3 bonus points |
| Stage runners-up | 2 bonus points |

== Stages ==
=== Stage 1 ===
The first stage took place in Siracusa, Italy. The hosts won the stage.

6 June 1998
Semi finals
| Germany | 8–5 | Spain |
| Italy | 6–2 | Switzerland |
7 June 1998
Third place play-off
| Spain | 9–1 | Switzerland |
Final
| Italy | 7–3 | Germany |

=== Stage 2 ===
The second stage took place in Zürich, Switzerland. Germany won the stage.

4 July 1998
Semi finals
| Germany | 6–5 (a.e.t) | Portugal |
| Switzerland | 4–2 | Italy |
5 July 1998
Third place play-off
| Portugal | 7–6 | Italy |
Final
| Germany | 9–6 | Switzerland |

=== Stage 3 ===
The third stage took place in Budva, Montenegro, FR Yugoslavia. France won the stage.

18 July 1998
Semi finals
| Spain | 4–3 | Portugal |
| Yugoslavia | 4–6 | France |
19 July 1998
Third place play-off
| Yugoslavia | 7–4 | Portugal |
Final
| France | 4–4 (a.e.t.); 2–1 (pen.) | Spain |

=== Stage 4 ===
The fourth stage took place in Sant Joan d'Alacant, Spain. Italy claimed their second stage win.

25 July 1998
Semi finals
| Italy | 4–3 (a.e.t) | France |
| Spain | 2–3 (a.e.t) | Yugoslavia |
26 July 1998
Third place play-off
| Spain | 7–4 | France |
Final
| Italy | 6–1 | Yugoslavia |

=== Stage 5 ===
The fifth stage took place in Travemünde, Germany. The hosts won their second stage.

1 August 1998
Semi finals
| Germany | 7–2 | Switzerland |
| Italy | 4–3 | France |
2 August 1998
Third place play-off
| France | 7–5 | Switzerland |
Final
| Germany | 5–3 | Italy |

=== Stage 6 ===
The sixth stage took place in Figueira da Foz, Portugal. These matches were also simultaneously part of the 1998 Mundialito tournament. The hosts won their first stage.

3 August 1998
Semi finals
| Portugal | 5–0 | Switzerland |
| Spain | 4–1 | Yugoslavia |
4 August 1998
Third place play-off
| Yugoslavia | 7–6 | Switzerland |
Final
| Portugal | 6–4 | Spain |

=== Stage 7 ===
The seventh and final stage took place in Monte Carlo, Monaco. Germany secured the title by beating France in the third place play-off. Portugal won their second stage, the only nation to win two consecutively.

19 September 1998
Semi finals
| Portugal | 9–4 | France |
| Yugoslavia | 9–3 | Germany |
20 September 1998
Third place play-off
| Germany | 7–6 | France |
Final
| Portugal | 3–2 | Yugoslavia |

=== Stage winners ===
| Team | Stage wins | Stage titles |
|---|---|---|
| Italy | 2 | Siracusa (1), Sant Joan d'Alacant (4) |
| Germany | 2 | Zürich (2), Travemünde (5) |
| Portugal | 2 | Figueira da Foz (6), Monte Carlo (7) |
| France | 1 | Budva (3) |

== Final Table ==
| Pos | Team | Matches | | | | | | | Pts | Stages | | | Bonus Pts | Total Pts | Notes |
| Pos | Team | Pld | W | W+ | L | GF | GA | GD | Pts | Pld | W | RU | Bonus Pts | Total Pts | Notes |
|---|---|---|---|---|---|---|---|---|---|---|---|---|---|---|---|
| 1 | Germany | 8 | 5 | 1 | 2 | 48 | 43 | +5 | 17 | 4 | 2 | 1 | 8 | 25 | EBSL Champions |
| 2 | Italy | 8 | 4 | 1 | 3 | 38 | 28 | +10 | 14 | 4 | 2 | 1 | 8 | 22 | Runners-up |
| 3 | Portugal | 8 | 5 | 0 | 3 | 42 | 33 | +9 | 15 | 4 | 2 | 0 | 6 | 21 | Third place |
| 4 | Spain | 8 | 4 | 0 | 4 | 39 | 30 | +9 | 12 | 4 | 0 | 2 | 4 | 16 | |
| 5 | Yugoslavia | 8 | 3 | 1 | 4 | 34 | 34 | 0 | 11 | 4 | 0 | 2 | 4 | 15 | |
| 6 | France | 8 | 2 | 1 | 5 | 37 | 44 | –7 | 8 | 4 | 1 | 0 | 3 | 11 | |
| 7 | Switzerland | 8 | 1 | 0 | 7 | 26 | 52 | –26 | 3 | 4 | 0 | 1 | 2 | 5 | |

=== Winners ===
1998 Euro Beach Soccer League
champions

Germany
First title

== Sources ==
- Roonba
- BSWW
