= Czech Republic national beach soccer team =

Czech Republic
- Nickname: Nároďák
- Association: Fotbalová asociace České republiky (FAČR)
- Confederation: UEFA (Europe)
- Head coach: Michael Lukič
- Captain: Martin Chalupa
- Most caps: Jaroslav Kovařík (47)
- Top scorer: Radek Mikan (33)
- FIFA code: CZE
- BSWW ranking: 33 ▲3 (1 June 2026)
First colours
Second colours

Biggest win
- Czech Republic 7 – 0 Norway (Terracina, Italy; 8 June 2012)

Biggest defeat
- Czech Republic 2 – 12 Turkey (Moscow, Russia; 6 August 2011)

The Czech Republic national beach soccer team represents the Czech Republic in international beach soccer competitions and is controlled by the FAČR, the governing body for football in Czech Republic.

== Current squad ==
Correct as of August 2013

Note: Flags indicate national team as defined under FIFA eligibility rules; some limited exceptions apply. Players may hold more than one non-FIFA nationality.

No.	Pos.	Nation	Player
1	GK		Tomás Zidlicky
2	DF		Jaroslav Kovarik
5	DF		Michal Salak
7	MF		Martin Dlouhy
8	MF		Michal Kubice

No.	Pos.	Nation	Player
10	FW		Martin Chalupa (captain)
14	MF		Lubomir Karda
17	FW		Tomáš Hurab
20	FW		Tosovsky
18	GK		Petr Visek

Coach: Michael Lukič

== Achievements ==
- FIFA Beach Soccer World Cup qualification (UEFA) Best: Quarter finals
  - 2008
