= Ilya Leonov =

Russian footballer (born 1979)

Personal information
- Full name: Ilya Yuryevich Leonov
- Date of birth: 21 December 1979
- Place of birth: Moscow, Soviet Union
- Position: Defender

Team information
- Current team: Lokomotiv Moscow

Senior career*
| Years | Team | Apps | (Gls) |
| 1998–2000 | Sportakademklub Moscow (futsal) | 70 | (2) |
| 2000–2003 | Poligran (futsal) | | |
| 2004–2005 | Leman-Payp (futsal) | | |
| 2005–2011 | Strogino (beach soccer) | 30 | (29) |
| 2010 | Delta (beach soccer) | 5 | (5) |
| 2010–2018 | Lokomotiv Moscow (beach soccer) | 163 | (65) |

International career^{‡}
| 2005–2016 | Russia national beach soccer team | 111 | (36) |

Managerial career
- 2013–: Lokomotiv Moscow (beach soccer)
- 2018–: Russia women's national beach soccer team
- * Club domestic league appearances and goals as of 10:37, 10 July 2019 (UTC) ‡ National team caps and goals as of 10:37, 10 July 2019 (UTC)

Medal record

Beach soccer

Representing Russia

FIFA Beach Soccer World Cup
| Gold medal – first place | 2011 Ravenna | |
| Gold medal – first place | 2013 Papeete | |
| Bronze medal – third place | 2015 Espinho | |

Beach Soccer Intercontinental Cup
| Gold medal – first place | 2011 Dubai | |
| Gold medal – first place | 2012 Dubai | |
| Silver medal – second place | 2013 Dubai | |
| Silver medal – second place | 2014 Dubai | |
| Gold medal – first place | 2015 Dubai | |

European Games
| Gold medal – first place | 2015 Baku | Team |

Euro Beach Soccer Cup
| Gold medal – first place | 2010 Rome | |
| Gold medal – first place | 2012 Moscow | |
| Silver medal – second place | 2005 Moscow | |

Ilya Yuryevich Leonov (Russian: Илья Юрьевич Леонов; born 21 December 1979 in Moscow) is a retired Russian beach soccer and former futsal player. From 2010 to 2018, he played for Lokomotiv Moscow, where for a time he served both as player and coach. After his retirement as a player he is coaching the Russia women's national beach soccer team, winning with them two Euro Beach Soccer Cups in a row, and continues coaching Lokomotiv Moscow.

He is Merited Master of Sports of Russia.

== Career ==
Leonov made his first steps into football in the school "Timiryazevets". He debuted in professional sports for Sportakademklub Moscow. After three seasons, Leonov decided to switch to futsal by debuting for Poligran Moscow. Following two seasons in the premier league, that club gained entry to the highest national futsal league. The 2002/03 season was the last one for Poligran, after which it was abolished. Leonov went to the Leman-Payp Moscow, then he played for Yakutian Almaz-Alrosa. In the second-highest division from 2009 to 2010 he and his team won the trophy.

In 2005, Leonov discovered beach soccer. Between futsal seasons he participated on beach soccer tournaments. He quickly debuted for the national beach soccer team and considerably helped his team to progress. In 2009 and 2011 the Russians won the superfinal of the Euro Beach Soccer League, and soon won their first championship title. Leonov as captain received the Golden Ball award.

On 21 December 2012, Leonov was named Merited Master of Sports by the order of the Sports Minister.

== Achievements ==
Some of Leonov's notable achievements:

=== As player ===
==== Futsal clubs ====
- European Champions Cup: (gold) 2006
- Club World Cup: (gold) 2005
- Intercontinental Cup: (gold) 2005, 2006, 2007

==== Beach soccer clubs ====
- Russian National Championship: (gold) 2008, 2009, 2010, 2011, 2012, (bronze) 2013, 2015, 2016
- Russian Cup: (gold) 2008, 2009, 2011, 2012, 2013, (silver) 2014
- Russian Super Cup: (gold) 2011
- Euro Winners Cup: (gold) 2013
- Mundialito de Clubes: (gold) 2012

==== Beach soccer national team ====
- FIFA Beach Soccer World Cup: (gold) 2011, 2013
- Euro Beach Soccer Cup: (silver) 2005, (gold) 2010, 2012
- Euro Beach Soccer League: (bronze) 2007, 2008, (gold) 2009, (bronze) 2010 (gold) 2011, (silver) 2012, (gold) 2013, 2014
- Beach Soccer Intercontinental Cup: (gold) 2011, 2012, (silver) 2013, 2014, (gold) 2015

==== Individually ====
- 2011 season
  - FIFA Beach Soccer World Cup – Golden Ball
- 2012 season
  - Merited Master of Sports (21 December 2012)
- 2013 season
  - Euro Beach Soccer League, Stage 5 – MVP
  - Euro Beach Soccer League, Superfinal – MVP

=== As coach ===
- Women's Euro Beach Soccer Cup: (gold) 2018, 2019
