= Romania national beach soccer team =

Beach soccer team of Romania

Romania
- Nickname: Tricolorii (The Tricolours)
- Association: Federaţia Română de Fotbal (FRF)
- Confederation: UEFA (Europe)
- Head coach: Viorel Farcaș
- Captain: Marian Posteucă
- Top scorer: Maci
- FIFA code: ROU
- BSWW ranking: 56 ▲3 (1 June 2026)
First colours
Second colours

Biggest defeat
- Portugal 11–0 Romania (Jesolo, Italy; 3 September 2016)

The Romania national beach soccer team represents Romania in international beach soccer competitions and is controlled by the FRF, the governing body for football in Romania.

== Current squad ==
Updated 23 August 2012

Note: Flags indicate national team as defined under FIFA eligibility rules; some limited exceptions apply. Players may hold more than one non-FIFA nationality.

No.	Pos.	Nation	Player
1	GK		Iulian Gândac
2	DF		Iulian Răvoiu
3	DF		Adrian Tănase
4	DF		Ionel Posteucă-Pulhac
6	DF		Liviu Croitoru
7	MF		Raj Cărăuleanu
10	FW		Marian Posteucă-Pulhac (captain)

No.	Pos.	Nation	Player
11	FW		Lucian Chirilă
12	GK		Laurenţiu Marin
14	FW		Maci
19	MF		Cristian Crecan
—	DF		Emil Răducu
—	DF		Ionuț Florea

Coach: Viorel Farcaș

== Achievements ==
- Euro Beach Soccer League Superfinal fourth place: 2011, 2012
- Euro Beach Soccer League Superfinal sixth place: 2010
- Euro Beach Soccer League Italian Event runner-up: 2011
- Euro Beach Soccer League German Event runner-up: 2012
- Euro Beach Soccer League German Event third place: 2011
- Euro Beach Soccer League Dutch Event third place: 2010
- Euro Beach Soccer League Russian Event third place: 2010

== See also ==
- Romania national football team
- Romania national futsal team
- Romania national minifootball team
