= Norway national beach soccer team =

Beach soccer team of Norway

Norway
- Nickname: Drillos
- Association: Football Association of Norway (Norges Fotballforbund)
- Confederation: UEFA (Europe)
- Head coach: Rune Kandal
- FIFA code: NOR
- BSWW ranking: 53 (2 June 2025)
First colours
Second colours

Biggest defeat
- Romania 6–3 Norway (Alghero, Italy; 8 September 2018); Georgia 6–3 Norway (Nazaré, Portugal; 6 July 2019)

The Norway national beach soccer team represents Norway in international beach soccer competitions and is controlled by the NFF, the governing body for football in Norway.

== Current squad ==
Correct as of July 2012:

Note: Flags indicate national team as defined under FIFA eligibility rules; some limited exceptions apply. Players may hold more than one non-FIFA nationality.

No.	Pos.	Nation	Player
1	GK		Karl Fredrik Kalle Røsland
3	FW		Bjorn Totland
6	DF		Tom-Rune Sorensen
7	MF		Pak Ling Li

No.	Pos.	Nation	Player
9	MF		Henrik Salveson
10	FW		Endre Hansen
14	FW		Jorn Jacobsen
16	GK		Arnfinn Rekdal
12	GK		Khalid "Hulk" Hacham

Coach: Rune Kandal

== Participations ==
- ESBL Preliminary Event, Athens, Greece: 2007
- Challenge Cup, Netanya, Israel: 2008
- BSWW Euro League Stage 2, Tignes (French Alps), France: 2008
