= 2023 Euro Beach Soccer League =

Tournament details
- Host country: Italy
- Dates: 19–24 September
- Teams: 23 (from 1 confederation)
- Venue(s): 2 (in 1 host city)

Final positions
- Champions: Italy (3rd title)
- Runners-up: Spain
- Third place: Belarus
- Fourth place: Portugal

Tournament statistics
- Matches played: 62
- Goals scored: 520 (8.39 per match)

The 2023 Euro Beach Soccer League was the 26th edition of the Euro Beach Soccer League (EBSL), the annual, premier competition in European beach soccer featuring men's national teams. It was organised by Beach Soccer Worldwide (BSWW).

This season, the competing teams continued to take part in two divisions: the top tier (Division A) and the bottom tier (Division B). As planned last season, Division A was expanded from 12 to 16 teams this year (including one suspended member^{[a]}). Division B accommodated eight nations: those who did not gain promotion from last season and teams returning after an absence from competing in recent years.

Originally, regular season fixtures were scheduled for July in the midst of a busy European calendar (including the European Games in June and World Beach Games in August). However, the UEFA qualifiers for the 2023 FIFA Beach Soccer World Cup were ultimately realised during these dates in July instead; the EBSL regular season was not rescheduled. Hence, this season, all teams entered straight into their division's respective post-season events; for Division A teams, the Superfinal, to compete to become the winners of the EBSL, and for Division B teams, the Promotion Final, to try to earn a spot in Division A in 2024. Both events took place in Alghero, Italy.

Azerbaijan and Greece finished as the bottom two teams in Division A and were therefore relegated to Division B for 2024, the former ending a seven-year run in the top tier, and the latter demoted immediately back to the second tier after being promoted last season. In Division B, Lithuania and the Czech Republic gained promotion; the former earned the right to play in Division A for the first time, and the latter the first time since 2007.

Switzerland were the defending champions but lost in the quarter-finals, finishing in fifth place, only the third time the defending champions failed to finish among the top four. The title was won by Italy, who won their third title (others 2005 and 2018) by defeating Spain in the final, condemning the latter to their third runners-up finish since their last title in 2006. Portugal finished outside the podium places for only the second time in the history of the competition, whilst Romania finished sixth, their best performance since 2012.

== Division A ==
=== Teams ===
Of the 16 nations who earned Division A status at the end of last season, 13 entered into this season's top tier; of the outstanding three nations, one was suspended whilst two withdrew and were replaced, resulting in a total of 15 participating teams as follows:

(The numbers in parentheses show the European ranking of each team prior to the start of the season, out of 34 nations).

- Portugal (1st)
- ~~Russia~~^{[a]} (2nd)
- Spain (3rd)
- Switzerland (4th)
- Italy (5th)
- ~~Ukraine~~^{[b]} (6th) (replaced by Denmark (17th))
- Belarus (7th)
- Azerbaijan (8th)
- France (9th)
- Germany (10th)
- Moldova (11th)^{[P]}
- Poland (12th)
- Turkey (13th)^{[P]}
- Estonia (14th)
- Greece (19th)^{[P]}
- ~~Kazakhstan~~^{[P]}^{[c]} (21st) (replaced by Romania (23rd))

Notes:

a: In accordance with sanctions imposed by FIFA and UEFA in response to the Russian invasion of Ukraine, the Russian national team is currently suspended from participating in the competition.
b: Ukraine withdrew; the Ministry of Youth and Sports of Ukraine refused to sanction the Ukrainian national team's participation in the tournament in protest at the Belarus national team being allowed to compete, whom it believes should be barred from entering due the country's role in the Russian invasion of Ukraine. They were replaced by Denmark, the next highest placed team from last season's Division B final standings who did not finish high enough to gain promotion (seventh place; Latvia finished sixth but have not entered the competition this season), thereby awarding them with promotion to Division A post factum in the capacity of a lucky loser.
c: Kazakhstan withdrew; they were replaced by Romania, the next highest placed team from last season's Division B final standings who did not finish high enough to gain promotion (fifth place), thereby awarding them with promotion to Division A post factum in the capacity of a lucky loser.
P: Promoted from Division B at the end of the 2022 season.

=== Superfinal ===
Matches are listed as local time in Alghero, CEST (UTC+2) and are those scheduled; actual kick-off times may differ somewhat.

==== Draw ====
The draw to divide the teams into their respective groups took place on 30 August 2023.

==== Group stage ====
Key: Advance to –	Quarterfinals /	9th–11th place play-offs /	Relegation play-offs /	(H) Hosts

===== Group A =====
Pos	Team	Pld	W	W+	WP	L	GF	GA	GD	Pts
1	Italy (H)	3	3	0	0	0	17	6	+11	9
2	Belarus	3	2	0	0	1	18	7	+11	6
3	Moldova	3	1	0	0	2	8	20	–12	3
4	Greece	3	0	0	0	3	7	17	–10	0

19 September 2023	Belarus	9–1	Moldova	Main pitch
12:45	Kanstantsinau 2'; Novikau 7'; Ryabko 11', 36'; Drozd 12', 22'; Piatrouski 24'; Bokach 26'; Hapon 36'	Report	Ignat 36'	Referee: Łukasz Ostrowski (Poland)

19 September 2023	Greece	2–5	Italy	Main pitch
18:00	Mikelatos 18', 32'	Report	Giordani 9'; Genovali 10'; Zurlo 12'; Remedi 23', 34'	Referee: Malte Gerhardt (Germany)

20 September 2023	Belarus	7–2	Greece	Main pitch
11:30	Chaikouski 2'; Hapon 7', 17'; Bryshtel 11', 35'; Bokach 14'; Skourtas 31' (o.g.)	Report	Mikelatos 4'; Katsoulis 11'	Referee: Dario Minder (Switzerland)

20 September 2023	Italy	8–2	Moldova	Main pitch
18:00	Casapieri 3'; Fazzini 18'; Giordani 19'; Remedi 24'; Bertacca 27'; Zurlo 36', 36'; Genovali 36'	Report	Ignat 19'; Graur 30'	Referee: Sergio Gomes (Portugal)

21 September 2023	Moldova	5–3	Greece	Pitch 2
15:30	Cojocari 3'; Istrati 4'; Turta 19'; Garanovschi 23'; Graur 36'	Report	Mikelatos 27', 35'; Skourtas 29'	Referee: Mehdi Sayoud (Belgium)

21 September 2023	Italy	4–2	Belarus	Main pitch
18:00	Alla 5'; Fazzini 14'; Giordani 26'; Remedi 33'	Report	Kanstantsinau 2'; Novikau 7'	Referee: Łukasz Ostrowski (Poland)

===== Group B =====
Pos	Team	Pld	W	W+	WP	L	GF	GA	GD	Pts
1	Switzerland	3	2	0	0	1	20	17	+3	6
2	Romania	3	2	0	0	1	11	13	–2	6
3	Turkey	3	1	0	0	2	15	13	+2	3
4	Azerbaijan	3	0	0	1	2	14	17	–3	1

19 September 2023	Azerbaijan	5–5 (a.e.t.) (3–1 p)	Turkey	Main pitch
10:15	Sabir 2', 32'; Nazarov 10', 36'; Orkhan 25'	Report	Volkan 22', 29', 30'; Cem 23', 34'	Referee: Sergio Gomes (Portugal)
	Penalties
	Akhundov (penalty missed); Nazarov (penalty scored); Zeynalli (penalty scored); Sabir (penalty scored)		(penalty missed) Yasin; (penalty missed) Cem; (penalty missed) Volkan; (penalty scored) Semih

19 September 2023	Romania	3–8	Switzerland	Main pitch
15:30	Neag 3'; Daniel 11'; Măci 29'	Report	Ott 1', 9', 10', 17'; Hodel 4', 12', 20'; Eliott 18'	Referee: Raffaele Delvecchio (Italy)

20 September 2023	Azerbaijan	2–4	Romania	Main pitch
10:15	Sabir 5'; Orkhan 30'	Report	Măci 7', 9'; Andrescu 20'; Ionut 28'	Referee: Vladimir Tashkov (Bulgaria)

20 September 2023	Switzerland	4–7	Turkey	Main pitch
14:00	Ott 7', 16'; Hodel 22', 32'	Report	Volkan 2', 19'; Semih 8', 10'; Efe Lorenzo 8'; Rodrigues 29' (o.g.); Cem 36'	Referee: Vitalij Gomolko (Lithuania)

21 September 2023	Switzerland	8–7	Azerbaijan	Main pitch
14:00	Ott 5', 10', 28', 28', 31'; Stankovic 12'; Hodel 28'; Spacca 35'	Report	Sabir 4'; Ramil 5'; Elshad 5', 14'; Nazarov 7'; Akhundov 27'; Jomard 30'	Referee: Wilson Castanheira (Portugal)

21 September 2023	Turkey	3–4	Romania	Pitch 2
18:00	Ismail 15'; Ferhat 15'; Semih 36'	Report	Măci 8', 20', 29'; Cosmin 20'	Referee: Luca Romani (Italy)

===== Group C =====
Pos	Team	Pld	W	W+	WP	L	GF	GA	GD	Pts
1	Portugal	3	2	1	0	0	22	11	+11	8
2	Denmark	3	0	0	2	1	9	15	–6	2
3	Estonia	3	0	1	0	2	13	13	0	2
4	France	3	0	0	0	3	8	13	–5	0

19 September 2023	France	4–5 (a.e.t.)	Estonia	Main pitch
11:30	Bru 16'; Gharbi 19'; Constant 24'; Barbotti 32'	Report	Marmor 9', 24'; Rump 19'; Thomson 20', 37'	Referee: Saverio Bottalico (Italy)

19 September 2023	Denmark	4–10	Portugal	Main pitch
16:45	Damm 4', 15'; Lyng 33'; Madsen 34'	Report	Jordan 7', 21'; B. Lopes 10', 10'; Léo Martins 13', 33'; M. Pintado 16', 29', 36'; Coimbra 31'	Referee: Francisco de Oses (Spain)

20 September 2023	Portugal	6–5 (a.e.t.)	Estonia	Main pitch
15:30	Bê Martins 3'; M. Pintado 5', 24'; R. Brilhante 29'; Jordan 36', 38'	Report	Nõmmiko 8'; Munskind 12', 36'; Rahnik 27'; Er. Stüf 35'	Referee: Moreno Longo (Italy)

20 September 2023	France	2–2 (a.e.t.) (3–5 p)	Denmark	Pitch 2
18:00	Barbotti 21'; Gharbi 34'	Report	Damm 15'; Dorph 35'	Referee: Mehdi Sayoud (Belgium)

21 September 2023	Estonia	3–3 (a.e.t.) (4–5 p)	Denmark	Main pitch
10:15	Rump 10', 20'; Nõmmiko 21'	Report	Damm 1'; Madsen 15'; Dorph 35'	Referee: Saverio Bottalico (Italy)

21 September 2023	Portugal	6–2	France	Main pitch
15:30	M. Pintado 1', 14', 15'; B. Lopes 11'; Lourenço 34'; R. Brilhante 36'	Report	Gharbi 13', 19'	Referee: Dario Minder (Switzerland)

===== Group D =====
Pos	Team	Pld	W	W+	WP	L	GF	GA	GD	Pts
1	Spain	2	2	0	0	0	11	4	+7	6
2	Germany	2	1	0	0	1	5	9	–4	3
3	Poland	2	0	0	0	2	6	9	–3	0

19 September 2023	Spain	6–1	Germany	Main pitch
14:00	David 3'; Chiky 3', 6'; Batis 16'; Oliver 32'; Arias 36'	Report	Thürk 10'	Referee: Csaba Baghy (Hungary)

20 September 2023	Poland	3–4	Germany	Pitch 2
15:30	Karolak 7'; Bistuła 13'; Jesionowski 28'	Report	Baaske 2', 20'; Mülling 21'; Pietrasiak 25' (o.g.)	Referee: Luca Romani (Italy)

21 September 2023	Spain	5–3	Poland	Main pitch
11:30	Oliver 6'; Batis 8'; Guisado 10', 35'; Antonio 22'	Report	Jesionowski 13'; Łoś 21'; Gac 35'	Referee: Vitalij Gomolko (Lithuania)

==== Relegation play-offs (12th–15th place) ====
The teams finishing the group stage in fourth place, plus the worst performing third-placed team, retreat to the relegation play-offs, contested in a round-robin format.

The bottom two teams were relegated to Division B for the 2024 season.

Key: Outcome –	Relegated to 2024 Division B

Pos	Team	Pld	W	W+	WP	L	GF	GA	GD	Pts
1	France	3	2	0	0	1	14	8	+6	6
2	Moldova	3	1	0	1	1	9	8	+1	4
3	Azerbaijan	3	1	0	0	2	13	16	–3	3
4	Greece	3	0	0	1	2	7	11	–4	1

22 September 2023	Greece	2–2 (a.e.t.) (5–4 p)	Moldova	Pitch 2
15:30	Lympousis 20'; Mikelatos 28'	Report	Ignat 3', 12'	Referee: Moreno Longo (Italy)
	Penalties
	Mikelatos (penalty scored); Lympousis (penalty scored); Karakasis (penalty scored); Katsoulis (penalty missed); Skourtas (penalty scored); Triantafyllidis (penalty scored)		(penalty scored) Ignat; (penalty scored) Cojocari; (penalty scored) Graur; (penalty missed) Turta; (penalty scored) Sirghi; (penalty missed) Garanovschi

22 September 2023	Azerbaijan	3–9	France	Pitch 2
18:00	Gurbatov 2'; Elshad 19', 32'	Report	Bru 3', 21'; Lefebvre 5'; Varrel 6', 11', 28'; Gharbi 8', 15'; Constant 30'	Referee: José Pardeiro (Spain)

23 September 2023	Azerbaijan	6–3	Greece	Pitch 2
15:30	Ramil 13', 24', 36'; Nazarov 17', 29'; Mammadov 25'	Report	Mikelatos 7'; Skourtas 19'; Karakasis 29'	Referee: Raffaele Delvecchio (Italy)

23 September 2023	Moldova	3–2	France	Pitch 2
16:45	Cojocari 18'; Borovschi 20'; Moraru 31'	Report	Bru 12', 18'	Referee: José Pardeiro (Spain)

24 September 2023	France	3–2	Greece	Main pitch
09:00	Bru 19'; Constant 21'; Guerin 23'	Report	Katsoulis 21'; Stratis 24'	Referee: Vladimir Tashkov (Bulgaria)

24 September 2023	Moldova	4–4 (4–1 p)	Azerbaijan	Main pitch
10:15	Sirghi 2'; Borovschi 19', 27'; Graur 35'	Report	Sabir 6'; Mammadov 16', 23', 34'	Referee: Łukasz Ostrowski (Poland)

==== 9th–11th place ====
The three best third-placed teams from the group stage contest 9th through 11th place in a round-robin format.

Pos	Team	Pld	W	W+	WP	L	GF	GA	GD	Pts
1	Poland	2	2	0	0	0	8	4	+4	6
2	Estonia	2	1	0	0	1	9	11	–2	3
3	Turkey	2	0	0	0	2	6	8	–2	0

22 September 2023	Turkey	1–2	Poland	Main pitch
10:15	Efe Lorenzo 19'	Report	Bistuła 10'; Witkowski 31'	Referee: Arpad Jakab (Hungary)

23 September 2023	Estonia	3–6	Poland	Pitch 2
14:00	Marmor 23'; Er. Stüf 23', 34'	Report	Gruszewski 23'; Karolak 30'; Pietrasiak 32', 35'; Brochocki 32'; Jesionowski 35'	Referee: Luca Romani (Italy)

24 September 2023	Turkey	5–6	Estonia	Pitch 2
10:15	Oğuzhan 6', 27', 28'; Volkan 17'; Semih 33'	Report	Yasin 19' (o.g.); Juha 24'; Nõmmiko 25'; Er. Stüf 27'; Kigaste 28'; Kotter 36'	Referee: Patricia Gomez (Spain)

==== 1st–8th place ====
The winners and runners-up of the group stage progress to the knockout stage, a series of single elimination games to determine 1st through 8th place, starting with the quarter-finals and ending with the final. Per the outcomes of each round, the losers retreat to classification matches to determine their final ranking.

Fifth place match
24 September
Switzerland	8
Romania	6
Seventh place match
24 September
Denmark	5
Germany	6

5th–8th place semifinals
23 September
Switzerland	7
Denmark	5
23 September
Romania	4
Germany	2

Quarterfinals
22 September
Switzerland	3
Belarus	4
22 September
Spain	9
Denmark	5
22 September
Italy	8
Romania	2
22 September
Portugal	8
Germany	2

Semifinals
23 September
Belarus	2
Spain	4
23 September
Italy	2
Portugal	1

Final
24 September
Spain	4
Italy	5
Third place match
24 September
Belarus	6
Portugal	5

===== Quarter-finals =====
22 September 2023
12:45

Spain	9–5	Denmark
David 3', 4'; Camacho 5'; Chiky 6', 17'; Arias 8'; Kuman 24', 31'; Oliver 36'	Report	Frandsen 5'; Damm 10'; Madsen 16'; Jørgensen 16'; Wegeberg 30'

Main pitch
Referee: Sergio Gomes (Portugal)

22 September 2023
14:00

Switzerland	3–4	Belarus
Steinemann 1', 2'; Hodel 19'	Report	Ryabko 1'; Bryshtel 2'; Hardzetski 15'; Bokach 24'

Main pitch
Referee: Luca Romani (Italy)

22 September 2023
15:30

Portugal	8–2	Germany
Bê Martins 1', 19', 20'; M. Pintado 16', 17'; Léo Martins 27'; B. Lopes 30'; Jordan 32'	Report	Baaske 14'; Olli 36'

Main pitch
Referee: Dario Minder (Switzerland)

22 September 2023
18:00

Italy	8–2	Romania
Genovali 2'; Ionut 3' (o.g.); Giordani 21', 30'; Carpita 28'; Zurlo 31'; Fazzini 35'; Remedi 36'	Report	Măci 11', 30'

Main pitch
Referee: Vitalij Gomolko (Lithuania)

===== Semi-finals =====
====== 5th–8th place ======
23 September 2023
09:00

Switzerland	7–5	Denmark
Ott 3', 14', 28', 31'; Hodel 7', 14'; Ariel 29'	Report	Wegeberg 4', 12', 19'; Damm 22'; Madsen 29'

Main pitch
Referee: Francisco de Oses (Spain)

23 September 2023
12:45

Romania	4–2	Germany
Măci 10', 21', 29'; Andrescu 34'	Report	Peterson 28'; Thürk 30'

Pitch 2
Referee: Sergio Gomes (Portugal)

====== 1st–4th place ======
23 September 2023
15:30

Belarus	2–4	Spain
Bryshtel 18'; Hapon 31'	Report	Batis 21'; Chiky 21'; Oliver 24'; Kuman 31'

Main pitch
Referee: Csaba Baghy (Hungary)

23 September 2023
18:00

Italy	2–1	Portugal
Bertacca 5'; Giordani 17'	Report	Bê Martins 1'

Main pitch
Referee: Łukasz Ostrowski (Poland)

===== Play-offs =====
====== 7th place play-off ======
24 September 2023
11:30

Germany	6–5	Denmark
Peterson 11'; Sand 12'; Marquardt 13'; Thürk 22', 25'; Baaske 36'	Report	Engelhardt 8' (o.g.); Damm 10', 35', 36'; Wegeberg 12'

Pitch 2
Referee: Vitalij Gomolko (Lithuania)

====== 5th place play-off ======
24 September 2023
12:45

Romania	6–8	Switzerland
Cosmin 4', 24'; Enis 5'; Măci 8', 34'; Ionel 12'	Report	Stäuble 3'; Hodel 4', 36'; Steinemann 15', 21'; Stankovic 22', 26'; Caldas 26'

Pitch 2
Referee: Renata Jakab (Hungary)

====== 3rd place play-off ======
24 September 2023
14:00

Portugal	5–6	Belarus
Léo Martins 2'; Bê Martins 10', 19'; Rui Coimbra 14', 34'	Report	Ryabko 1', 27'; Bokach 19', 19'; Avgustov 22'; Chaikouski 36'

Main pitch
Referee: Luca Romani (Italy)

====== Final ======
24 September 2023
18:00

Italy	5–4	Spain
Alla 12'; Giordani 14', 19', 33'; Genovali 26'	Report	Arias 17'; Giordani 27' (o.g.); Oliver 28', 34'

Main pitch
Referee: Sergio Gomes (Portugal)

==== Awards ====
===== Winners trophy =====
2023 Euro Beach Soccer League
champions

Italy
Third title

===== Individual awards =====
Top scorer(s)
(Switzerland) Noël Ott
15 goals
Best player
(Italy) Marco Giordani
Best goalkeeper
(Italy) Leandro Casapieri

==== Final standings ====
Pos	Team	Result
1	Italy	EBSL Champions (3rd title)
2	Spain	Runners-up
3	Belarus	Third place
4	Portugal	
5	Switzerland	
6	Romania	
7	Germany	
8	Denmark	
9	Poland	
10	Estonia	
11	Turkey	
12	France	
13	Moldova	
14	Azerbaijan	Relegated to 2024 Division B
15	Greece	Relegated to 2024 Division B

==== Top scorers ====
The following table lists the top 10 scorers in Division A.

Rank	Player	Goals
1	(Switzerland) Noël Ott	15
2	(Romania) Marian Măciucă	13
3	(Switzerland) Glenn Hodel	11
4	(Portugal) Miguel Pintado	10
5	(Italy) Marco Giordani	9
5	(Denmark) Axel Damm	9
7	(Portugal) Bê Martins	7
7	(Greece) Dimitrios Mikelatos	7
9	(Spain) José Oliver	6
9	(Turkey) Volkan Yeşilırmak	6
9	(Azerbaijan) Orkhan Mammadov	6
9	(France) Gharbi Aness	6
9	(France) Jérémy Bru	6

== Division B ==
=== Teams ===
The following eight teams entered into Division B this season. Czech Republic, Sweden and Slovakia return after a one-season absence. No teams make their debut for the first time since 2015.

(The numbers in parentheses show the European ranking of each team prior to the start of the season, out of 34 nations).

- Lithuania (15th)
- Norway (16th)
- Czech Republic (18th)
- Sweden (20th)
- England (22nd)
- Malta (24th)
- Slovakia (25th)
- Georgia (26th)

=== Promotion Final ===
Matches are listed as local time in Alghero, CEST (UTC+2) and are those scheduled; actual kick-off times may differ somewhat.

The top two teams earn promotion to Division A for the 2024 season.

==== Draw ====
No draw took place to allocate the teams into their respective groups. Instead, the teams were split based on the results of last season's Promotion Final standings.

==== Group stage ====
Key: Advance to –	Semifinals /	5th–8th place play-offs

===== Group A =====
Pos	Team	Pld	W	W+	WP	L	GF	GA	GD	Pts
1	Lithuania	3	2	0	1	0	13	7	+6	7
2	Czech Republic	3	2	0	0	1	17	8	+9	6
3	England	3	1	0	0	2	13	12	+1	3
4	Slovakia	3	0	0	0	3	5	21	–16	0

20 September 2023	Slovakia	3–8	England	Main pitch
09:00	Hrnčiar 20'; Volkay 21'; Kanyai 22'	Report	Day 2', 20'; Clarke 13', 14'; Jermy 19'; Grossett 26', 34'; O'Neill 31'	Referee: Raffaele Delvecchio (Italy)

20 September 2023	Lithuania	4–4 (a.e.t.) (3–1 p)	Czech Republic	Pitch 2
11:30	Plytnikas 14', 30'; Giedraitis 24', 25'	Report	Bártl 12'; Plytnikas 19' (o.g.); Salák 20'; Valeš 33'	Referee: Wilson Castanheira (Portugal)
	Penalties
	Smolkovas (penalty scored); Makutunovičius (penalty scored); Navickas (penalty scored)		(penalty missed) Vyhnal; (penalty scored) Trampota; (penalty missed) Pekárek; (penalty missed) Valeš

21 September 2023	Lithuania	5–1	Slovakia	Pitch 2
12:45	Giedraitis 31', 32'; Plytnikas 34'; Makutunovičius 35', 36'	Report	Letko 5'	Referee: Csaba Baghy (Hungary)

21 September 2023	England	3–5	Czech Republic	Pitch 2
14:00	Clarke 28'; Jermy 33'; Temple 36'	Report	Folejtar 9'; Trampota 18', 21', 25'; Pekárek 20'	Referee: José Pardeiro (Spain)

22 September 2023	England	2–4	Lithuania	Main pitch
09:00	Clarke 7'; Day 25'	Report	Makutunovičius 20', 24', 27'; Giedraitis 25'	Referee: Angelika Gębka (Poland)

22 September 2023	Czech Republic	8–1	Slovakia	Pitch 2
11:30	Salák 12', 32'; Chvostek 9' (o.g.); Trampota 16'; Vyhnal 23', 27'; Pekárek 23'; Valeš 29'	Report	Šmálik 16'	Referee: Fiammetta Susanna (Italy)

===== Group B =====
Pos	Team	Pld	W	W+	WP	L	GF	GA	GD	Pts
1	Norway	3	3	0	0	0	18	10	+8	9
2	Georgia	3	2	0	0	1	17	9	+8	6
3	Sweden	3	1	0	0	2	11	13	–2	3
4	Malta	3	0	0	0	3	6	20	–14	0

20 September 2023	Georgia	7–1	Malta	Pitch 2
12:45	Diakvnishvilis 5', 19'; Lomidze 8', 15'; Kokoladze 20'; Jalagania 23'; Tchvritidze 31'	Report	Agius 3'	Referee: Patricia Gomez (Spain)

20 September 2023	Sweden	3–5	Norway	Pitch 2
14:00	Slätis 6'; Johagen 9', 16'	Report	Salveson 7', 19'; Paulos 24'; Rasch 24'; Hellman 34'	Referee: Mehdi Sayoud (Belgium)

21 September 2023	Norway	8–4	Malta	Main pitch
09:00	Salveson 2', 14', 32', 35'; Paulos 15'; Dyngeland 19'; Aano 29', 32'	Report	Agius 4'; R. Gatt 6'; Micallef 25', 26'	Referee: Renata Jakab (Hungary)

21 September 2023	Georgia	7–3	Sweden	Pitch 2
11:30	Jalagania 9', 10', 16'; G. Makharadze 21', 28'; Tchvritidze 25'; Diakvnishvili 29'	Report	Nevelin 9', 13'; Slätis 29'	Referee: Moreno Longo (Italy)

22 September 2023	Malta	3–5	Sweden	Pitch 2
12:45	Micallef 23'; R.Gatt 4', 8'	Report	Boström 5'; Olofsson 14'; Johagen 17', 19', 27'	Referee: Patricia Gomez (Spain)

22 September 2023	Norway	5–3	Georgia	Pitch 2
14:00	Gaare 9'; Elverum 16', 22'; Salveson 30'; Rasch 31'	Report	Diakvnishvili 24'; Jalagania 32'; Shamiladze 34'	Referee: Malte Gerhardt (Germany)

==== Play-offs ====
===== 5th–8th place =====
5th–8th place semifinals
23 September
England	11
Malta	0
23 September
Sweden	3
Slovakia	4

Fifth place match
24 September
England	4
Slovakia	1
Seventh place match
24 September
Malta	3
Sweden	5

====== Semi-finals ======
23 September 2023
10:15

England	11–0	Malta
Day 3'; Grossett 6', 12', 27', 31'; Temple 16'; Camara 16'; Clarke 25', 30', 34'; Gauci 35' (o.g.)	Report

Pitch 2
Referee: Fiammetta Susanna (Italy)

23 September 2023
11:30

Sweden	3–4	Slovakia
Sjöström 8'; Boström 33'; Wiklund 34'	Report	Letko 8', 13'; Hustý 28'; Grey 29'

Pitch 2
Referee: Angelika Gębka (Poland)

====== 7th place match ======
24 September 2023
14:00

Malta	3–5	Sweden
R. Gatt 16', 20'; Micallef 36'	Report	Olofsson 4'; Wiklund 14', 30'; Wennebro 16'; Sjöström 36'

Pitch 2
Referee: Csaba Baghy (Hungary)

====== 5th place match ======
24 September 2023
15:30

England	4–1	Slovakia
Lawson 3', 25'; Clarke 6', 36'	Report	Šmálik 29'

Pitch 2
Referee: Moreno Longo (Italy)

===== 1st–4th place =====
Semifinals
23 September
Norway	4
Czech Republic	6
23 September
Lithuania	5
Georgia	2

Final
24 September
Czech Republic	2
Lithuania	3
Third place match
24 September
Norway	2
Georgia	3

====== Semi-finals ======
23 September 2023
10:15

Norway	4–6	Czech Republic
Salveson 17'; Andrle 14' (o.g.); Aano 32'; Rasch 36'	Report	Trampota 6', 35'; Folejtar 22'; Valeš 22', 30'; Pekárek 23'

Main pitch
Referee: Wilson Castanheira (Portugal)

23 September 2023
11:30

Lithuania	5–2	Georgia
Giedraitis 8'; Navickas 14'; Plytnikas 19'; Novičkov 30'; Makutunovičius 36'	Report	Diakvnishvili 18'; Tchvritidze 19'

Main pitch
Referee: Saverio Bottalico (Italy)

====== 3rd place match ======
24 September 2023
16:45

Georgia	3–2	Norway
Diakvnishvili 4'; Shamiladze 23'; Lomidze 31'	Report	Salveson 7'; Rasch 30'

Pitch 2
Referee: José Pardeiro (Spain)

====== Final ======
24 September 2023
12:45

Lithuania	3–2	Czech Republic
Lebedevas 22'; Plytnikas 25'; Novičkov 30'	Report	Trampota 10', 18'

Main pitch
Referee: Malte Gerhardt (Germany)

==== Awards ====
Winners trophy	Top scorer(s)		Best player	Best goalkeeper
Lithuania	(Norway) Henrik Salveson (England) Aaron Clarke	9 goals	(Lithuania) Paulius Giedraitis	(Czech Republic) Jan Bártl

==== Final standings ====
Pos	Team	Result
1	Lithuania	Promoted to 2024 EBSL Division A
2	Czech Republic	Promoted to 2024 EBSL Division A
3	Georgia	Remain in Division B
4	Norway	Remain in Division B
5	England	Remain in Division B
6	Slovakia	Remain in Division B
7	Sweden	Remain in Division B
8	Malta	Remain in Division B

==== Top scorers ====
The following table lists the top 10 scorers in Division B.

Rank	Player	Goals
1	(Norway) Henrik Salveson	9
1	(England) Aaron Clarke	9
3	(Czech Republic) Lukáš Trampota	8
4	(Lithuania) Paulius Giedraitis	6
4	(Lithuania) Mantas Makutunovičius	6
4	(Georgia (country)) Giorgi Diakvnishvili	6
4	(England) Reanu Grossett	6
8	(Georgia (country)) David Jalagania	5
8	(Sweden) Niklas Johagen	5
8	(Lithuania) Audrius Plytnikas	5

== See also ==
- 2023 Women's Euro Beach Soccer League
