= 2023 FIFA Beach Soccer World Cup qualification (UEFA) =

FIFA Beach Soccer World Cup Qualifier – Europe – Baku 2023

Tournament details
- Host country: Azerbaijan
- City: Baku
- Dates: 2–9 July
- Teams: 20 (from 1 confederation)
- Venue: 1 (in 1 host city)

Final positions
- Champions: Belarus; Portugal; Ukraine; Italy; qualify for the World Cup

Tournament statistics
- Matches played: 45
- Goals scored: 341 (7.58 per match)
- Top scorer(s): (Germany) Olli Romrig (10 goals)

The 2023 FIFA Beach Soccer World Cup European Qualifiers was a beach soccer tournament contested by European beach soccer national teams who are members of UEFA. The tournament decided the four qualifiers that will go to the 2023 FIFA Beach Soccer World Cup in the United Arab Emirates. This event took place from 2–9 July in Baku, Azerbaijan. The tournament was multi-stage, consisting of a pre-qualifier, final group stage round, and a knockout stage with placement matches.

Spain were the defending champions of the tournament after winning the 2021 edition, but were unable to defend their title as they lost in the FIFA Beach Soccer World Cup play-offs to Italy. There were no semifinals and finals, unlike in 2021; the tournament concluded after the quarterfinals, the winners of which earned UEFA's four bids to the 2023 FIFA Beach Soccer World Cup. These bids were won by Italy, Belarus, Ukraine, and Portugal. Olli Romrig of Germany finished as the leading goalscorer with ten goals, ahead of Denmark's Axel Damm and Switzerland's Noël Ott, both of whom finished runners-up with seven goals.

== Format ==
The competition began with a pre-qualifier stage from July 2 to 4.

The final stage was held from July 5 to 9.

The 16 teams will be split into four groups of four. Teams will three points for a win in normal time, two points for a win in extra-time, and one point for a win on penalties. The top two finishers in each group will go through to the knockout phase. Thereafter, quarter-finals, semi-finals, a third-place play-off and final will unfold.

== Teams ==
The following countries are competing in the European qualifiers either by achieving a position in the Beach Soccer World Rankings or by qualifying from the preliminaries, held from 2 to 4 July.

- Azerbaijan
- Belarus
- Denmark^{1}
- Estonia
- France
- Germany
- Greece^{1}
- Italy
- Lithuania^{1}
- Moldova
- Poland
- Portugal
- Spain
- Switzerland
- Turkey
- Ukraine
Notes:

1. Pre-qualifier teams

== Pre-qualifier teams ==
In the Qualifiers for the remaining three places in the European Qualifiers will take part:

- Czech Republic
- Denmark
- Greece
- Lithuania
- Malta
- Norway
- Sweden

== Draw ==
The draw for both the pre-qualifier stage and final stage were held on 15 June 2023.

== First group stage ==
Each team earns three points for a win in regulation time, two points for a win in extra time, one point for a win in a penalty shoot-out, and no points for a defeat.

All times are local, AZT (UTC+4).

=== Group A ===
| Pos | Team | Pld | W | W+ | WP | L | GF | GA | GD | Pts | Qualification |
|---|---|---|---|---|---|---|---|---|---|---|---|
| 1 | Denmark | 2 | 2 | 0 | 0 | 0 | 10 | 2 | +8 | 6 | Second group stage |
| 2 | Greece | 2 | 1 | 0 | 0 | 1 | 7 | 4 | +3 | 3 | Second group stage |
| 3 | Norway | 2 | 0 | 0 | 0 | 2 | 2 | 13 | −11 | 0 | |

Source: BSWW
2 July 2023
19:30

| Norway | 1–7 | Denmark |
|---|---|---|
| Li 29' | Report | Ryding 5', 17'; Madsen 16'; Damm 26', 27', 28'; Rædkjær 33' |

Referee: Ingilab Mammadov (Azerbaijan)

3 July 2023
18:15

| Greece | 1–3 | Denmark |
|---|---|---|
| Tsitsaris 18' | Report | Madsen 21'; Dorph 22'; Frandsen 28' |

Referee: Francisco de Oses Bumedien (Spain)

4 July 2023
19:30

| Norway | 1–6 | Greece |
|---|---|---|
| K. Badivuku 18' | Report | Skourtas 4', 25'; Mikelatos 9', 12'; Katsoulis 29'; Koukovinis 36' |

Referee: Luca Romani (Italy)

=== Group B ===
| Pos | Team | Pld | W | W+ | WP | L | GF | GA | GD | Pts | Qualification |
|---|---|---|---|---|---|---|---|---|---|---|---|
| 1 | Lithuania | 3 | 3 | 0 | 0 | 0 | 11 | 5 | +6 | 9 | Second group stage |
| 2 | Czech Republic | 3 | 2 | 0 | 0 | 1 | 9 | 6 | +3 | 6 | |
| 3 | Sweden | 3 | 1 | 0 | 0 | 2 | 9 | 10 | −1 | 3 | |
| 4 | Malta | 3 | 0 | 0 | 0 | 3 | 4 | 12 | −8 | 0 | |

Source: BSWW
2 July 2023
17:00

| Czech Republic | 3–1 | Sweden |
|---|---|---|
| Radosta 16', 29'; Huráb 23' | Report | Lavah 20' |

Referee: Vladimir Tashkov (Bulgaria)
2 July 2023
18:15

| Malta | 0–3 | Lithuania |
|---|---|---|
| | Report | Plytnikas 13'; Bartosevič 24'; Giedraitis 25' |

Referee: Sergio Filipe Gomes Soares (Portugal)

3 July 2023
17:00

| Czech Republic | 4–2 | Malta |
|---|---|---|
| Salak 3'; Radosta 5'; Pekárek 20'; Karpíšek 24' | Report | Agius 3'; Radosta 8' (o.g.) |

Referee: Murat Ergin Gozutok (Turkey)
3 July 2023
19:30

| Lithuania | 5–3 | Sweden |
|---|---|---|
| Plytnikas 2', 12', 13', 23'; Makutunovičius 8' | Report | Malmström 2'; Gustafsson 8'; Hjerpebo 29' |

Referee: Ingilab Mammadov (Azerbaijan)

4 July 2023
17:00

| Sweden | 5–2 | Malta |
|---|---|---|
| Garcia 7', 33'; Gustafsson 11'; Palmén 25', 28' | Report | D. Caruana 9'; Agius 13' |

Referee: Eduards Borisevics (Latvia)
4 July 2023
18:15

| Lithuania | 3–2 | Czech Republic |
|---|---|---|
| Makutunovičius 5', 23'; Navickas 11' | Report | Trampota 34'; Trampota 36' |

Referee: Lukasz Ostrowski (Poland)

== Second group stage ==
As per the regulations of the second group stage draw, the statistically best qualifier from the first group stage was automatically allocated to position B3; this was Lithuania.

The other three qualifiers (Group A, Group B and the best runner-up) were placed into the groups via a draw, made after the conclusion of the first group stage. All four teams were placed in one pot. The first team drawn out was placed into Group A, second into B and so on; they were allocated to position 4 in their respective groups.

=== Group A ===
| Pos | Team | Pld | W | W+ | WP | L | GF | GA | GD | Pts | Qualification |
|---|---|---|---|---|---|---|---|---|---|---|---|
| 1 | Italy | 3 | 3 | 0 | 0 | 0 | 9 | 4 | +5 | 9 | Knockout stage |
| 2 | Moldova | 3 | 2 | 0 | 0 | 1 | 10 | 7 | +3 | 6 | Knockout stage |
| 3 | Estonia | 3 | 1 | 0 | 0 | 2 | 10 | 13 | −3 | 3 | 9th–12th place play-offs |
| 4 | Azerbaijan (H) | 3 | 0 | 0 | 0 | 3 | 8 | 13 | −5 | 0 | 13th–16th place play-offs |

Source: BSWW
(H) Host
5 July 2023
13:30

| Italy | 3–1 | Estonia |
|---|---|---|
| Zurlo 14'; Casapieri 15'; Sciacca 31' | Report | Munskind 14' |

Referee: Lukasz Ostrowski (Poland)

5 July 2023
18:45

| Azerbaijan | 2–3 | Moldova |
|---|---|---|
| Elchin 8'; Kamran 33' | Report | Turta 4'; Ignat 8'; Graur 28' |

Referee: Vitalij Gomolko (Lithuania)

6 July 2023
13:30

| Italy | 3–1 | Moldova |
|---|---|---|
| Fazzini 11'; Bertacca 22'; Genovali 36' | Report | Schițenco 2' |

Referee: Mehdi Sayoud (Belgium)

6 July 2023
18:45

| Azerbaijan | 4–7 | Estonia |
|---|---|---|
| F. Huseynov 4'; Orkhan 11'; Elshad 21', 31' | Report | Rump 3', 15'; Mäeorg 4'; Lepik 9'; Marmor 14'; Kotter 21'; Nõmmiko 27' |

Referee: Malte Gerhardt (Germany)

7 July 2023
13:30

| Estonia | 2–6 | Moldova |
|---|---|---|
| Lepik 6'; Marmor 23' | Report | Sîrghi 6', 35'; Istrati 13'; Podlesnov 21'; Graur 23'; Turta 29' |

Referee: Sergio Filipe Gomes Soares (Portugal)

7 July 2023
18:45

| Azerbaijan | 2–3 | Italy |
|---|---|---|
| Ramil 11'; Miceli 17' (o.g.) | Report | Miceli 4'; Remedi 9'; Zurlo 18' |

Referee: Eduards Borisevics (Latvia)

=== Group B ===
| Pos | Team | Pld | W | W+ | WP | L | GF | GA | GD | Pts | Qualification |
|---|---|---|---|---|---|---|---|---|---|---|---|
| 1 | Ukraine | 3 | 2 | 1 | 0 | 0 | 11 | 6 | +5 | 8 | Knockout stage |
| 2 | Spain | 3 | 2 | 0 | 0 | 1 | 14 | 8 | +6 | 6 | Knockout stage |
| 3 | Poland | 3 | 1 | 0 | 0 | 2 | 7 | 8 | −1 | 3 | 9th–12th place play-offs |
| 4 | Lithuania | 3 | 0 | 0 | 0 | 3 | 4 | 14 | −10 | 0 | 13th–16th place play-offs |

Source: BSWW
5 July 2023
14:45

| Poland | 3–1 | Lithuania |
|---|---|---|
| Gac 14'; Gruszewski 21', 35' | Report | Makutunovičius 15' |

Referee: Ingilab Mammadov (Azerbaijan)

5 July 2023
20:00

| Spain | 3–4 (a.e.t.) | Ukraine |
|---|---|---|
| David 5', 9'; Dona 11' | Report | Guisado 2' (o.g.); Nerush 4'; Voitok 18', 37' |

Referee: Saverio Bottalico (Italy)

6 July 2023
14:45

| Ukraine | 3–2 | Poland |
|---|---|---|
| Levchenko 9'; A. Borsuk 21'; Zborovskyi 34' | Report | Los 17'; Gac 25' |

Referee: Csaba Baghy (Hungary)

6 July 2023
20:00

| Spain | 7–2 | Lithuania |
|---|---|---|
| Pedro 3'; Plytnikas 16' (o.g.); David 17'; Antonio 18'; Arias 21'; Batis 29', 34' | Report | Navickas 2'; Makutunovičius 20' |

Referee: Vladimir Tashkov (Bulgaria)

7 July 2023
14:45

| Ukraine | 4–1 | Lithuania |
|---|---|---|
| Pashko 1'; Zavorotnyi 4'; Zborovskyi 16'; A. Borsuk 18' | Report | Giedraitis 6' |

Referee: Ozcan Sultanoglu (Turkey)

7 July 2023
20:00

| Spain | 4–2 | Poland |
|---|---|---|
| Chicky 12', 19', 23'; Pedro 21' | Report | Oliver 5' (o.g.); Brochocki 20' |

Referee: Malte Gerhardt (Germany)

=== Group C ===
| Pos | Team | Pld | W | W+ | WP | L | GF | GA | GD | Pts | Qualification |
|---|---|---|---|---|---|---|---|---|---|---|---|
| 1 | Portugal | 3 | 3 | 0 | 0 | 0 | 20 | 10 | +10 | 9 | Knockout stage |
| 2 | France | 3 | 2 | 0 | 0 | 1 | 13 | 13 | 0 | 6 | Knockout stage |
| 3 | Germany | 3 | 1 | 0 | 0 | 2 | 17 | 15 | +2 | 3 | 9th–12th place play-offs |
| 4 | Greece | 3 | 0 | 0 | 0 | 3 | 6 | 18 | −12 | 0 | 13th–16th place play-offs |

Updated to match(es) played on unknown. Source: BSWW
5 July 2023
12:15

| France | 5–3 | Greece |
|---|---|---|
| Bru 5'; Angeletti 8', 17', 23'; Varrel 32' | Report | Skourtas 9'; Triantafyllidis 10'; Mikelatos 22' |

Referee: Francisco de Oses Bumedien (Spain)

5 July 2023
17:30

| Portugal | 8–6 | Germany |
|---|---|---|
| Torres 12'; R. Brilhante 18', 19'; Léo Martins 27', 36'; Coimbra 28'; Jordan 34'; M. Pintado 34' | Report | Olli 9', 36'; Lüth 14'; Peterson 23'; Biermann 24'; Petry 31' |

Referee: Ozcan Sultanoglu (Turkey)

6 July 2023
12:15

| Germany | 8–2 | Greece |
|---|---|---|
| Biermann 2', 7', 14', 26'; Olli 18', 25'; Engelhardt 20'; Peterson 35' | Report | Biermann 14' (o.g.); Karakasis 22' |

Referee: Vitalij Gomolko (Lithuania)

6 July 2023
17:30

| Portugal | 7–3 | France |
|---|---|---|
| Fayos 4' (o.g.); Jordan 10'; Andrade 19'; Coimbra 22', 36'; M. Pintado 24'; Bernardo 25' | Report | Bru 5', 17'; Barbotti 9' |

Referee: Luca Romani (Italy)

7 July 2023
12:15

| Germany | 3–5 | France |
|---|---|---|
| Biermann 4'; Lüth 12'; Olli 35' | Report | Barbotti 10', 24'; Varrel 12', 28'; Segura 32' |

Referee: Lukasz Ostrowski (Poland)

7 July 2023
17:30

| Portugal | 5–1 | Greece |
|---|---|---|
| B. Martins 17', 20'; Jordan 20'; R. Pinhal 27'; Bernardo 34' | Report | Tsitsaris 30' |

Referee: Ago Kärtmann (Estonia)

=== Group D ===
| Pos | Team | Pld | W | W+ | WP | L | GF | GA | GD | Pts | |
|---|---|---|---|---|---|---|---|---|---|---|---|
| 1 | Belarus | 3 | 3 | 0 | 0 | 0 | 27 | 10 | +17 | 9 | Knockout stage |
| 2 | Denmark | 3 | 2 | 0 | 0 | 1 | 12 | 14 | −2 | 6 | Knockout stage |
| 3 | Turkey | 3 | 1 | 0 | 0 | 2 | 9 | 19 | −10 | 3 | 9th–12th place play-offs |
| 4 | Switzerland | 3 | 0 | 0 | 0 | 3 | 10 | 15 | −5 | 0 | 13th–16th place play-offs |

Source: BSWW
5 July 2023
11:00

| Belarus | 10–2 | Turkey |
|---|---|---|
| Recep 5' (o.g.); Hardzetski 9', 13'; Ustsinovich 17'; Bryshtsel 17', 23'; Hapon 22'; Bokach 33', 35'; Piatrouski 33' | Report | Mehmet 25'; Efe Lorenzo 28' |

Referee: Sergio Filipe Gomes Soares (Portugal)

5 July 2023
16:15

| Denmark | 3–2 | Switzerland |
|---|---|---|
| Madsen 29', 31'; Frandsen 32' | Report | Frandsen 5' (o.g.); Stankovic 12' |

Referee: Vladimir Tashkov (Bulgaria)

6 July 2023
11:00

| Belarus | 8–2 | Denmark |
|---|---|---|
| Hapon 2', 21', 33', 35'; Drozd 8'; Novikau 19'; Staskevich 21'; Piatrouski 23' | Report | Frandsen 6'; Damm 8' |

Referee: Nail Naghiyev (Azerbaijan)

6 July 2023
16:15

| Switzerland | 2–3 | Turkey |
|---|---|---|
| Hodel 10', 23' | Report | Cem Keskin 6', 32'; Volkan 31' |

Referee: Ago Kärtmann (Estonia)

7 July 2023
11:00

| Turkey | 4–7 | Denmark |
|---|---|---|
| Mehmet 2'; Cem Keskin 3', 6', 15' | Report | Wegeberg 5'; Damm 7', 9'; Madsen 7'; Rædkjær 10'; Dorph 11' |

Referee: Saverio Bottalico (Italy)

7 July 2023
16:15

| Switzerland | 6–9 | Belarus |
|---|---|---|
| Kessler 9'; Rüttimann 12'; Ott 14', 16'; Steinemann 23'; Bokach 23' (o.g.) | Report | Mahaletski 15'; Bokach 19'; Ryabko 23', 23', 32'; Bryshtsel 25', 35'; Kanstantsinau 29'; Hardzetski 35' |

Referee: Francisco de Oses Bumedien (Spain)

== 13th–16th place play-offs ==
The teams finishing in fourth place in the groups of the second group stage faced each other in consolation matches to determine 13th through 16th place in the final standings.

13th–16th place semi-finals
8 July
Switzerland (a.e.t.) | 6
Greece | 5
8 July
Azerbaijan | 3
Lithuania | 2

13th place match
9 July
Switzerland | 6 (4)
Azerbaijan (p) | 6 (5)
15th place match
9 July
Lithuania (p) | 4 (6)
Greece | 4 (5)

=== Semi-finals ===
8 July 2023
16:15

| Switzerland | 6–5 (a.e.t.) | Greece |
|---|---|---|
| Steinemann 7', 14'; Caldas 10'; Spacca 18', 21'; Eliott 39' | Report | Karakasis 7'; Triantafyllidis 9'; Katsoulis 10'; Tsitsaris 14'; Lympousis 24' |

Referee: Lukasz Ostrowski (Poland)
8 July 2023
20:00

| Azerbaijan | 3–2 | Lithuania |
|---|---|---|
| Orkhan 3'; Ramil 15'; Elshad 34' | Report | Makutunovičius 35', 36' |

Referee: Saverio Bottalico (Italy)

=== 15th place match ===
9 July 2023
12:15

| Lithuania | 4–4 (a.e.t.) | Greece |
|---|---|---|
| Navickas 4', 20', 24'; Makutunovičius 32' | Report | Mikelatos 3'; Tsiakalos 6'; Koukovinis 27'; Paloumpis 29' |
Penalties
| | 6–5 |

Referee: Ozcan Sultanoglu (Turkey)

=== 13th place match ===
9 July 2023
11:00

| Switzerland | 6–6 (a.e.t.) | Azerbaijan |
|---|---|---|
| Ott 4', 21', 22', 30', 36'; Steinemann 10' | Report | Elshad 1', 19'; Jomard 8'; Ramil 17', 27'; Orkhan 32' |
Penalties
| | 4–5 |

Referee: Ago Kärtmann (Estonia)

== 9th–12th place play-offs ==
The teams finishing in third place in the groups of the second group stage faced each other in consolation matches to determine 9th through 12th place in the final standings.

9th–12th place semi-finals
8 July
Germany | 4 (4)
Turkey (p) | 4 (5)
8 July
Estonia (a.e.t.) | 5
Poland | 4

9th place match
9 July
Turkey (p) | 3 (4)
Estonia | 3 (3)
11th place match
9 July
Poland | 8
Germany | 6

=== Semi-finals ===
8 July 2023
17:30

| Germany | 4–4 (a.e.t.) | Turkey |
|---|---|---|
| Olli 18', 30'; Widmann 21', 34' | Report | Yasin 6'; Emrah 16', 32'; İsmail 28' |
Penalties
| Penalty scored Penalty missed | 4–5 | Penalty scored Penalty missed |

Referee: Sergio Filipe Gomes Soares (Portugal)
8 July 2023
18:45

| Estonia | 5–4 (a.e.t.) | Poland |
|---|---|---|
| Er. Stüf 2'; Lepik 7'; Rump 11'; Anissimov 29'; Marmor 39' | Report | Popławski 2'; Lisowski 4'; Jesionowski 33', 35' |

Referee: Luca Romani (Italy)

=== 11th place match ===
9 July 2023
13:30

| Poland | 8–6 | Germany |
|---|---|---|
| Jesionowski 10'; Witkowski 15', 23', 32'; Gac 18'; Bistuła 19'; Ziober 20'; Kłopeć 25' | Report | Olli 4', 7', 8'; Widmann 17'; Engelhardt 26'; Lüth 34' |

Referee: Francisco de Oses Bumedien (Spain)

=== 9th place match ===
9 July 2023
14:45

| Turkey | 3–3 (a.e.t.) | Estonia |
|---|---|---|
| Nõmmiko 3' (o.g.); Serkan 14', 14' | Report | Marmor 3'; Lepik 11', 34' |
Penalties
| Penalty scored Penalty missed | 4–3 | Penalty missed Penalty scored |

Referee: Eduards Borisevics (Latvia)

== FIFA Beach Soccer World Cup play-offs ==
Winners will qualify for 2023 FIFA Beach Soccer World Cup.

9 July 2023
16:15

| Belarus | 3–1 | France |
|---|---|---|
| Bryshtsel 14', 18'; Novikau 35' | Report | Bru 2' |

Referee: Saverio Bottalico (Italy)
9 July 2023
17:30

| Portugal | 8–3 | Denmark |
|---|---|---|
| Jordan 3'; Coimbra 4', 24'; Léo Martins 13', 23', 27'; Pinhal 19'; Martins 28' | Report | Frandsen 3'; Damm 14'; Rædkjær 17' |

Referee: Luca Romani (Italy)
9 July 2023
18:45

| Ukraine | 5–2 | Moldova |
|---|---|---|
| Zborovskyi 2'; Poslavskyi 22'; Pashko 25'; Voitenko 27'; Nerush 29' | Report | Podlesnov 5'; Graur 23' |

Referee: Lukasz Ostrowski (Poland)
9 July 2023
20:00

| Italy | 4–3 (a.e.t.) | Spain |
|---|---|---|
| Bertacca 1'; Remedi 11', 16'; Zurlo 39' | Report | David 18'; Chicky 28'; Guisado 32' |

Referee: Sergio Filipe Gomes Soares (Portugal)

== Statistics ==
=== Goalscorers ===
There were 339 goals scored in 45 matches, for an average of 7.53 goals per match.

10 goals

- (Germany) Olli Romrig

7 goals

- (Denmark) Axel Damm
- (Switzerland) Noël Ott

6 goals

- (Belarus) Ihar Bryshtsel
- (Germany) Christian Biermann
- (Lithuania) Mantas Makutunovičius

5 goals

- (Belarus) Aleh Hapon
- (Denmark) Gustav Madsen
- (Lithuania) Audrius Plytnikas
- (Portugal) Rui Coimbra
- (Portugal) Léo Martins
- (Turkey) Cem Keskin

4 goals

- (Azerbaijan) Elshad Manafov
- (Azerbaijan) Ramil Aliyev
- (Denmark) Lukas Frandsen
- (Estonia) Sander Lepik
- (Estonia) Kristian Marmor
- (France) Jérémy Bru
- (Greece) Dimitrios Alexandros Mikelatos
- (Lithuania) Elvinas Navickas
- (Portugal) Jordan Santos
- (Spain) Salvador Chicky
- (Spain) David Ardil Navarro
- (Switzerland) Tobias Steinemann

3 goals

- (Azerbaijan) Orkhan Mammadov
- (Belarus) Vadzim Bokach
- (Belarus) Yahor Hardzetski
- (Belarus) Anatoliy Ryabko
- (Czech Republic) David Radosta
- (Denmark) Henrik Rædkjær
- (Estonia) Ragnar Rump
- (France) Victor Angeletti
- (France) Anthony Barbotti
- (France) Kylian Varrel
- (Germany) Cristoph Lüth
- (Greece) Ioannis Skourtas
- (Greece) Konstantinos Tsitsaris
- (Italy) Alessandro Remedi
- (Italy) Emmanuele Zurlo
- (Moldova) Dumitru Graur
- (Poland) Filip Gac
- (Poland) Jakub Jesionowski
- (Poland) Michal Witkowski
- (Portugal) Bernardo Santos Martins
- (Ukraine) Oleg Zborovskyi

2 goals

- (Belarus) Yauheni Novikau
- (Belarus) Yuri Piatrouski
- (Denmark) Casper Dorph
- (Denmark) Ryding Klaus Bradt Dewaegenaere
- (Germany) Tim Engelhardt
- (Germany) Jannes Peterson
- (Germany) Felix Widmann
- (Greece) Georgios Karakasis
- (Greece) Andreas Katsoulis
- (Greece) Konstantinos Koukovinis
- (Greece) Theofilos Triantafyllidis
- (Italy) Luca Bertacca
- (Lithuania) Paulius Giedraitis
- (Malta) Matthew Agius
- (Moldova) Leonid Podlesnov
- (Moldova) Artiom Turta
- (Poland) Jakub Bistuła
- (Poland) Mateusz Gruszewski
- (Portugal) Bernardo Lopes
- (Portugal) Rúben Brilhante
- (Portugal) Rodrigo Pinhal
- (Portugal) Miguel Pintado
- (Spain) Pedro Garcia Paredes
- (Spain) Soleiman Batis El Asri
- (Sweden) William Garcia
- (Sweden) Erik Gustafsson
- (Sweden) William Palmén
- (Switzerland) Glenn Hodel
- (Turkey) Mehmet Aşlamacı
- (Turkey) Serkan Banazlı
- (Ukraine) Andrii Borsuk
- (Ukraine) Andrii Nerush
- (Ukraine) Andrii Pashko
- (Ukraine) Maksym Voitok

1 goal

- (Azerbaijan) Elchin Gasimov
- (Azerbaijan) Fuad Huseynov
- (Azerbaijan) Jomard Bakhshaliyev
- (Azerbaijan) Kamran Gurbatov
- (Belarus) Artsemi Drozd
- (Belarus) Ivan Kanstantsinau
- (Belarus) Kanstantsin Mahaletski
- (Belarus) Pavel Staskevich
- (Belarus) Uladzimir Ustsinovich
- (Czech Republic) Tomáš Huráb
- (Czech Republic) Lukáš Karpíšek
- (Czech Republic) Jakub Pekárek
- (Czech Republic) Michal Salak
- (Denmark) Carl Oscar Wegeberg
- (Estonia) Albert Anissimov
- (Estonia) Kaspar Kotter
- (Estonia) Priit Mäeorg
- (Estonia) Rasmus Munskind
- (Estonia) Rauno Nõmmiko
- (Estonia) Ervin Stüf
- (France) Lucas Segura
- (Germany) Peer Petry
- (Greece) Michail Lympousis
- (Greece) Dimitrios Paloumpis
- (Greece) Ioannis Tsiakalos
- (Italy) Leandro Casapieri
- (Italy) Tommaso Fazzini
- (Italy) Francesco Fabio Sciacca
- (Italy) Gianmarco Genovali
- (Italy) Alessandro Miceli
- (Lithuania) Viktor Bartosevič
- (Malta) Dylan Caruana
- (Moldova) Nicolae Ignat
- (Moldova) Ruslan Istrati
- (Moldova) Serghei Schițenco
- (Moldova) Alexandru Sîrghi
- (Norway) Krenar Badivuku
- (Norway) Pak Ling Li
- (Poland) Grzegorz Brochocki
- (Poland) Arkadiusz Kłopeć
- (Poland) Mateusz Lisowski
- (Poland) Lukasz Stanislaw Los
- (Poland) Artur Popławski
- (Poland) Ziober Witold
- (Portugal) Elinton Andrade
- (Portugal) Bruno Torres
- (Spain) Antonio José Mayor Hernández
- (Spain) Jose Manuel Arias
- (Spain) Francisco Dona
- (Spain) Fernando Guisado Pérez
- (Sweden) Sebastian Hjerpebo
- (Sweden) Nils Lavah
- (Sweden) Filip Malmström
- (Switzerland) Gabriel Caldas
- (Switzerland) Silvano Kessler
- (Switzerland) Eliott Mounoud
- (Switzerland) Patrick Rüttimann
- (Switzerland) Sandro Spaccarotella
- (Switzerland) Dejan Stankovic
- (Turkey) Efe Lorenzo Deniz
- (Turkey) Emrah Ekmekçi
- (Turkey) İsmail Turhan
- (Turkey) Yasin Bağcı
- (Turkey) Volkan Yeşilırmak
- (Ukraine) Ihor Levchenko
- (Ukraine) Oleksandr Poslavskyi
- (Ukraine) Dmytro Voitenko
- (Ukraine) Yaroslav Zavorotnyi

1 own goal

- (Belarus) Vadzim Bokach (against Switzerland)
- (Czech Republic) David Radosta (against Malta)
- (Denmark) Lukas Frandsen (against Switzerland)
- (Estonia) Rauno Nõmmiko (against Turkey)
- (France) Anthony Fayos (against Portugal)
- (Germany) Christian Biermann (against Greece)
- (Italy) Alessandro Miceli (against Azerbaijan)
- (Lithuania) Audrius Plytnikas (against Spain)
- (Spain) Fernando Guisado Pérez (against Ukraine)
- (Spain) Oliver Santiago (against Poland)
- (Turkey) Recep Demir (against Belarus)

== Qualified teams to the FIFA Beach Soccer World Cup ==
The following four teams from UEFA qualify for the 2023 FIFA Beach Soccer World Cup.

| Team | Qualified on | Previous appearances in FIFA Beach Soccer World Cup^{1} only FIFA era (since 2005) |
|---|---|---|
| Belarus | 9 July 2023 | 2 (2019, 2021) |
| Portugal | 9 July 2023 | 10 (2005, 2006, 2007, 2008, 2009, 2011, **2015**, 2017, **2019**, 2021) |
| Ukraine^{2} | 9 July 2023 | 3 (2005, 2011, 2013) |
| Italy | 9 July 2023 | 8 (2006, 2007, 2008, 2009, 2011, 2015, 2017, 2019) |
| Spain^{2} | 27 September 2023 | 8 (2005, 2006, 2007, 2008, 2009, 2013, 2015, 2021) |

^{1} Bold indicates champions for that year. Italic indicates hosts for that year. ^{2} Ukraine originally qualified. However, on 27 September 2023, it was announced that the Ministry of Youth and Sports of Ukraine had refused to sanction the Ukrainian national team's participation in the tournament, in protest at the Belarus national team being allowed to compete, whom it believes should be barred from entering due the country's role in the Russian invasion of Ukraine. Ukraine previously qualified for, but also boycotted the 2021 World Cup due to its venue being in Russia. They were replaced by Spain, who statistically finished in fifth place in the UEFA qualifiers and therefore enter as lucky losers.
