= 2021 Euro Beach Soccer League =

Tournament details
- Host countries: Portugal; Moldova
- Dates: 17 June – 12 September
- Teams: 24 (from 1 confederation)
- Venue: 4 (in 3 host cities)

Final positions
- Champions: Portugal (8th title)
- Runners-up: Belarus
- Third place: Italy
- Fourth place: Spain

Tournament statistics
- Matches played: 76
- Goals scored: 566 (7.45 per match)

Locations of the two stages and the Superfinal of the 2021 Euro Beach Soccer League

The 2021 Euro Beach Soccer League was the 24th season of the Euro Beach Soccer League (EBSL), the annual, premier competition in European beach soccer contested between men's national teams. It was organised by Beach Soccer Worldwide (BSWW), in a league and play-off format.

After only Division A went ahead last season due to the COVID-19 pandemic, for the 2021 season, the competing teams returned to taking part in two divisions: the top tier (Division A) and the bottom tier (Division B). 12 teams contested Division A; all twelve teams returned from the 2019 season after only five participated in 2020 due to travel constraints caused by the COVID-19 pandemic. Division B also accommodated 12 nations: those who did not gain promotion in 2019, Slovakia making their debut, and teams that returned after an absence from competing in recent years prior to 2020.

Due to continued effects of the COVID-19 pandemic in Europe, the season's format was altered considerably compared to the usual program. A total of just two stages of fixtures were scheduled during the regular season. All 12 teams from Division A played together in just one stage (compared to the usual two) whilst each team in Division B also played together in one stage.

The eight best teams in Division A advanced to the post-season event, the Superfinal, to compete to become the winners of the EBSL. Meanwhile, the top seven teams in Division B and the team ranked bottom of Division A played in a different post-season event, the Promotion Final, to try to earn a spot in Division A in 2022.

Estonia were promoted to Division A for the first time after beating Turkey to claim the Promotion Final title; the Turks, having finished last in Division A, failed to defend their place in the Promotion Final and were therefore relegated to Division B, ending their four-year run in the top tier. Portugal were the two-time defending champions and successfully defended the title, extending their record total to eight European crowns; by winning a third consecutive title, Portugal matched the feat only previously achieved by Spain between 1999 and 2001. Belarus reached their first final, and became the first new nation to finish in the top four since Romania in 2011. Despite winning the 2021 World Cup just a fortnight prior, Russia failed to finish in the top four for the first time since 2006.

== Calendar and locations ==
The calendar below was revealed on 13 April 2021.

Phase	Dates	Country	City	Stage	Divisions	
Regular season	17–19 June	Portugal	Nazaré	Stage 1	A	
Regular season	28 July – 1 August	Moldova	Chișinău	Stage 2		B
Postseason/ Finals	8–12 September	Portugal	Figueira da Foz	Superfinal	A	
Postseason/ Finals	8–12 September	Portugal	Figueira da Foz	Promotion Final		B

== Teams ==
Competing in Division A Competing in Division B Competed in previous editions but not this year Never competed in the EBSL

The following teams entered the season, divided into two divisions, A and B, as shown (12 in Division A, 12 in Division B).

The numbers in parentheses show the European ranking of each team prior to the start of the season, out of 34 nations.

=== Division A ===
In 2020, teams from Division A who decided not to compete because of any concerns surrounding the COVID-19 pandemic were not penalised. This season, BSWW declared teams would be penalised for not competing unless they could provide evidence of a legitimate reason in respect of the continued effects of the pandemic. Ultimately, all teams did participate.

- Portugal (1st)
- Italy (2nd)
- Russia (3rd)
- Spain (4th)
- Switzerland (5th)
- Belarus (6th)
- Ukraine (7th)
- France (8th)
- Germany (9th)
- Poland (10th)
- Azerbaijan (11th)
- Turkey (12th)

=== Division B ===
England did not compete for the first time since their debut in 2001, ending 19 consecutive years of participation; Sweden returned for the first time since 2004.

- Czech Republic (13th)
- Greece (14th)
- Kazakhstan (17th)
- Norway (18th)
- Estonia (19th)
- Romania (20th)
- Lithuania (21st)
- Moldova (22nd)
- Bulgaria (24th)
- Denmark (25th)
- Slovakia^{1} (31st)
- Sweden (n/a)

Notes:

1. Teams making their debut

== Stage 1 (Nazaré, 17–19 June) ==
Matches are listed as local time in Nazaré, WEST (UTC+1)

All matches took place at the Estádio do Viveiro – Jordan Santos on Praia de Nazaré (Nazaré Beach). Due to COVID-19 concerns, the matches were played behind closed doors.

All teams from Division A competed; there were no Division B fixtures during this stage. It took place in tandem with the first group stage of the World Cup qualifiers for UEFA; the teams of Division A joined its second group stage immediately after the conclusion of this event. BSWW decided to organise the two events back-to-back in the same location involving all nations, in order to minimise travel in consideration of the continued effects of the COVID-19 pandemic.

The best eight teams qualified for the Superfinal; the worst team was consigned to the Promotion Final.

Key:	Qualified for the Superfinal /	Consigned to the Promotion Final /	(H)	Hosts

=== Group 1 ===
Pos	Team	Pld	W	W+	WP	L	GF	GA	GD	Pts
1	Portugal (H)	3	2	0	1	0	20	6	+14	7
2	Ukraine	3	0	1	1	1	9	8	+1	3
3	Germany	3	0	1	0	2	8	17	–9	2
4	Azerbaijan	3	0	0	0	3	9	15	–6	0

17 June 2021	Ukraine	3–2 (a.e.t.)	Germany
11:15	Zborovskiy 3', 34'; Pashko 39'	Report(ru)	16', 34' Metzler

17 June 2021	Azerbaijan	2–7	Portugal
12:45	Nazarov 13'; Allahguliyev 15'	Report(ru)	5', 18', 34' Léo Martins; 9' Bê Martins; 32' Torres; 33' Belchior; 34' (pen.) Coimbra

18 June 2021	Ukraine	3–3 (a.e.t.) (5–4 p)	Azerbaijan
11:15	Zborovskiy 5'; Voitenko 29', 34'	Report(ru)	11' Mammadov; 14', 18' Allahguliyev

18 June 2021	Portugal	10–1	Germany
12:45	Belchior 2' (pen.), 31'; Bê Martins 3', 17', 18'; Brilhante 6'; Torres 29'; Mano 30'; Coimbra 32'; André Lourenço 36'	Report(ru)	36' Ebener

19 June 2021	Germany	5–4 (a.e.t.)	Azerbaijan
11:15	Svenson 8', 33'; Biermann 18'; Metzler 26' (pen.), 39'	Report(ru)	16', 29' Amid; 19' Asif; 33' Sabir

19 June 2021	Portugal	3–3 (a.e.t.) (4–2 p)	Ukraine
12:45	Coimbra 24'; Léo Martins 29', 33'	Report(ru)	4', 21' (pen.) Voitenko; 32' (o.g.) Brilhante
	Penalties
	Bê Martins (penalty scored); Belchior (penalty scored); Léo Martins (penalty scored); Coimbra (penalty scored)		(penalty scored) Medvid; (penalty missed) Voitok; (penalty missed) Korniichuk; (penalty scored) Pashko

=== Group 2 ===
Pos	Team	Pld	W	W+	WP	L	GF	GA	GD	Pts
1	Italy	3	2	0	1	0	13	11	+2	7
2	Switzerland	3	2	0	0	1	18	17	+1	6
3	Poland	3	1	0	0	2	15	15	0	3
4	France	3	0	0	0	3	9	12	–3	0

17 June 2021	Italy	5–4	France
14:00	Gori 20', 31'; Giordani 25'; Zurlo 25'; Josep Jr. 29'	Report(ru)	2', 20' Huck; 23', 29' Tremoulet

17 June 2021	Poland	9–10	Switzerland
18:15	Petrasyak 2', 5', 23', 33'; Brochowsky 4', 26'; Becker 12'; Bistula 14'; Gac 16'	Report(ru)	15', 24' Mounoud; 22', 24', 33', 34', 36' Borer; 28' Schirinzi; 34', 36' Hodel

18 June 2021	Italy	2–2 (a.e.t.) (5–3 p)	Poland
14:00	Marinai 8'; Gori 24'	Report(ru)	21' Petrasyak; 29' Becker

18 June 2021	Switzerland	3–2	France
18:15	Borer 5'; Stanković 29' (pen.); Gosselin 30' (o.g.)	Report(ru)	5' Basquaise; 11' Gosselin

19 June 2021	France	3–4	Poland
14:00	Barbotti 18' (pen.), 31'; Basquaise 33'	Report(ru)	1', 35', 36' Pietrasiak; 24' Brochocki

19 June 2021	Switzerland	5–6	Italy
18:15	Monoud 2', 31'; Hodel 5'; Borer 8'; Wanji 20'	Report(ru)	6', 10' Zurlo; 9', 20', 31', 31' Gori

=== Group 3 ===
Pos	Team	Pld	W	W+	WP	L	GF	GA	GD	Pts
1	Russia	3	2	1	0	0	16	9	+7	8
2	Spain	3	2	0	0	1	16	12	+4	6
3	Belarus	3	1	0	0	2	14	13	+1	3
4	Turkey	3	0	0	0	3	6	18	–12	0

17 June 2021	Spain	6–3	Belarus
15:30	J. Torres 17', 17', 35'; Riduan 22'; Llorenç 28'; P. Perez 28'	Report	14' Kanstantsinau; 23' Piatrouski; 32' Novikau

17 June 2021	Turkey	1–5	Russia
19:30	Keskin 13'	Report(ru)	1' Raskin; 5', 36' Krasheninnikov; 19' Nikonorov; 20' Zemskov

18 June 2021	Spain	5–3	Turkey
15:30	Llorenç 6', 34'; J. Torres 31'; Domingo 33'; Chiky 36'	Report	19' Yasin; 24', 36' Bariş

18 June 2021	Russia	5–3	Belarus
19:30	Makarov 13', 16'; Zemskov 14', 31'; Kosharnyi 22'	Report(ru)	16' Kanstatsinau; 24' (pen.) Ryabko; 34' Bokach

19 June 2021	Belarus	8–2	Turkey
15:30	Ryabko 9'; Chaikouski 10'; Hardzetski 11'; Kanstatsinau 16'; Mahaletski 17'; Novikau 17'; Bokach 24'; Piatrouski 30'	Report	17' Semih; 27' Bariş

19 June 2021	Russia	6–5 (a.e.t.)	Spain
19:30	Zemskov 11'; Nikonorov 14'; Novikov 28', 33'; Makarov 34'; Romanov 38'	Report(ru)	1' Juanmi; 7' P. Perez; 8' D. Ardil; 30' J. Torres; 34' Llorenç

=== Awards ===
The following were presented after the conclusion of the final day's matches.

Stage Winners trophy	Top scorer(s)		Best player	Best goalkeeper
Russia	(Poland) Patryk Pietrasiak	8 goals	(Switzerland) Philipp Borer	(Portugal) Elinton Andrade

== Stage 2 (Chișinău, 28 July – 1 August) ==
Matches are listed as local time in Chișinău, EEST (UTC+3)

All matches took place at the FMF Beach Soccer Arena in La Izvor Park; the stadium had a capacity of 1,024, however was limited to 50% in order to accommodate social distancing measures regarding the COVID-19 pandemic.

There were no Division A fixtures during this stage, making this the first stage exclusive to Division B teams since 2007. Slovakia made their EBSL debut during this stage; Moldova hosted for the first time.

=== Group stage ===
Key: Advance to –	Semi-finals /	5th–8th place play-offs /	9th–11th place play-offs /	Withdrew /	(H)	Hosts

==== Group A ====
Pos	Team	Pld	W	W+	WP	L	GF	GA	GD	Pts
1	Moldova (H)	2	2	0	0	0	9	1	+8	6
2	Bulgaria	2	1	0	0	1	9	9	0	3
3	Slovakia	2	0	0	0	2	6	14	–8	0
–	Denmark^{[a]}	0	0	0	0	0	0	0	0	0

1. Denmark's withdrawal was announced on 25 July, due to travel constraints caused by the COVID-19 pandemic.

28 July 2021	Bulgaria	Cancelled	Denmark
14:30

28 July 2021	Slovakia	0–6	Moldova
18:30		Report	9' Ignat; 15', 18' Cojocari; 33' Podlesnov; 33' Negara; 35' Gurjui	Referee: Eduards Borisevics (Latvia)

29 July 2021	Bulgaria	8–6	Slovakia
14:30	Filipov 1', 6', 20', 34'; Merazchiev 6', 20'; Lozanov 16'; Tuzakov 31'	Report	1' Šmálik; 2' Kanyai; 2' Letko; 6', 28' Grey; 36' Lipovský	Referee: Ago Kärtmann (Estonia)

29 July 2021	Moldova	Cancelled	Denmark
18:30

30 July 2021	Denmark	Cancelled	Slovakia
14:30

30 July 2021	Moldova	3–1	Bulgaria
18:30	Cojocari 3'; Negara 13'; Graur 15'	Report	21' Merazchiev	Referee: Ozcan Sultanoglu (Turkey)

==== Group B ====
Pos	Team	Pld	W	W+	WP	L	GF	GA	GD	Pts
1	Kazakhstan	3	2	0	0	1	12	8	+4	6
2	Lithuania	3	2	0	0	1	9	7	+2	6
3	Greece	3	1	0	0	2	5	9	–4	3
4	Sweden	3	1	0	0	2	8	10	–2	3

Kazakhstan & Lithuania; Greece & Sweden are ranked based on their head-to-head results.

28 July 2021	Kazakhstan	4–3	Lithuania
13:15	Demeshko 2'; Makazhanov 11', 32'; Perevyortov 23'	Report	8' Novičkov; 10' Navickas; 12' Levonauskas	Referee: Ago Kärtmann (Estonia)

28 July 2021	Sweden	1–4	Greece
17:15	Granberg 36'	Report	6' Triantafyllidis; 18' Mikelatos; 33', 36' Katsoulis	Referee: Oleg Cebotari (Moldova)

29 July 2021	Kazakhstan	3–5	Sweden
13:15	Demeshko 18'; Perevyortov 25'; Yershin 26'	Report	2' Turesson; 19' Granberg; 22' Malmström; 29' Lavah; 36' Kettler	Referee: Piotr Stoianov (Moldova)

29 July 2021	Greece	1–3	Lithuania
17:15	Triantafyllidis 34'	Report	29' Giedraitis; 31', 34' Lebedev	Referee: Ozcan Sultanoglu (Turkey)

30 July 2021	Lithuania	3–2	Sweden
13:15	Meškinis 28'; Smolkovas 31'; Levonauskas 33'	Report	5' Gustafsson; 24' Palmen	Referee: Roman Borisov (Russia)

30 July 2021	Greece	0–5	Kazakhstan
17:15		Report	12', 31' Azhikenov; 23' Demeshko; 29' Yershin; 33' Perevyortov	Referee: Ago Kärtmann (Estonia)

==== Group C ====
Pos	Team	Pld	W	W+	WP	L	GF	GA	GD	Pts
1	Estonia	3	3	0	0	0	17	6	+11	9
2	Czech Republic	3	2	0	0	1	13	7	+6	6
3	Romania	3	1	0	0	2	8	14	–6	3
4	Norway	3	0	0	0	3	3	14	–11	0

28 July 2021	Romania	3–8	Estonia
12:00	Alex 31'; Voica 32'; Andrescu 34'	Report	12', 22', 26' Marmor; 13' Er. Stüf; 31' Sooaluste; 33' Alaväli; 34' Rahnik; 36' Nõmmiko	Referee: Vladimir Tashkov (Bulgaria)

28 July 2021	Norway	1–6	Czech Republic
16:00	Elverum 36'	Report	19' Huráb; 22', 36' Valeš; 24' Jeřábek; 31', 34' Trampota	Referee: Laurynas Arzuolaitis (Lithuania)

29 July 2021	Romania	4–2	Norway
12:00	Boata 11'; Ravi 20'; Bolojan 23'; Alex 31'	Report	14' Jalland; 30' Rasch	Referee: Cepoi Octavian (Moldova)

29 July 2021	Czech Republic	3–5	Estonia
16:00	Vyhnal 3'; Trampota 8', 26'	Report	11' Ed. Stüf; 20' (o.g.) Petárek; 21' Marmor; 25' Er. Stüf; 33' Rahnik	Referee: Matthieu Dor (France)

30 July 2021	Estonia	4–0	Norway
12:00	Er. Stüf 18'; Palm 21'; Kotter 22'; Remmelgas 35'	Report		Referee: Eduards Borisevics (Latvia)

30 July 2021	Czech Republic	4–1	Romania
16:00	Trampota 5', 25'; Valeš 26', 31'	Report	26' Boata	Referee: Vladimir Tashkov (Bulgaria)

==== Final group stage ranking ====
Since Group A consisted of three teams, for the teams in first, second and third place in Groups B and C, their results against the teams finishing in fourth place in their groups were discounted for this ranking.

Ranking & tie-breaking criteria: 1. Group placement 2. Points earned 3. Goal difference 4. Goals for

Pos	Team	Pld	W	W+	WP	L	GF	GA	GD	Pts	Grp	Qualification
1	Moldova (H)	2	2	0	0	0	9	1	+8	6	1A	Semi-finals
2	Estonia	2	2	0	0	0	13	6	+7	6	1C	Semi-finals
3	Kazakhstan	2	2	0	0	0	9	3	+6	6	1B	Semi-finals
4	Czech Republic	2	1	0	0	1	7	6	+1	3	2C	Semi-finals
5	Lithuania	2	1	0	0	1	6	5	+1	3	2B	5th–8th place play-offs
6	Bulgaria	2	1	0	0	1	9	9	0	3	2A	5th–8th place play-offs
7	Greece	2	0	0	0	2	1	8	–7	0	3B	5th–8th place play-offs
8	Slovakia	2	0	0	0	2	6	14	–8	0	3A	5th–8th place play-offs
9	Romania	2	0	0	0	2	4	12	–8	0	3C	9th–11th place play-offs
10	Sweden	3	1	0	0	2	8	10	–2	3	4B	9th–11th place play-offs
11	Norway	3	0	0	0	3	3	14	–11	0	4C	9th–11th place play-offs

=== Semi-finals ===
31 July 2021 9th–11th place	Sweden	3–2	Norway
11:00	Turesson 13', 23'; Granberg 35'	Report	9' Jalland; 22' Elverum	Referee: Ago Kärtmann (Estonia)

31 July 2021	Romania	1–1 (a.e.t.) (5–3 p)	Norway
16:00	Voica 12'	Report	16' Jalland	Referee: Oleg Cebotari (Moldova)
	Penalties
	Ravi (penalty scored); Andreescu (penalty scored); Boață (penalty scored); Bolat (penalty scored); Dumi (penalty scored)		(penalty scored) Jalland; (penalty scored) Elverum; (penalty missed) Li; (penalty scored) Nielsen

31 July 2021 5th–8th place	Bulgaria	0–3	Greece
13:15		Report	27' Mikelatos; 28', 31' Gkritzalis	Referee: Cepoi Octavian (Moldova)

31 July 2021	Lithuania	0–6	Slovakia
14:30		Report	11' Čarnogurský; 13' Letko; 24' Topor; 27', 29' Grey; 35' Hustý	Referee: Piotr Stoianov (Moldova)

31 July 2021 1st–4th place	Estonia	1–0	Kazakhstan
17:15	Marmor 18'	Report		Referee: Laurynas Arzuolaitis (Lithuania)

31 July 2021	Moldova	5–2	Czech Republic
18:30	Negara 7', 14', 15'; Podlesnov 18'; Cojocari 35'	Report	7' Trampota; 33' Vyhnal	Referee: Ozcan Sultanoglu (Turkey)

=== Finals ===
1 August 2021 9th place match	Sweden	0–1	Romania
13:15		Report	26' Voica	Referee: Ozcan Sultanoglu (Turkey)

1 August 2021 7th place match	Lithuania	6–1	Bulgaria
14:30	Novičkov 5'; Lebedev 9'; Levonauskas 11', 13'; Navickas 23'; Nedev 27' (o.g.)	Report	34' Filipov	Referee: Matthieu Dor (France)

1 August 2021 5th place match	Slovakia	2–7	Greece
16:00	Kanyai 13'; Hustý 23'	Report	5', 7', 32' Katsoulis; 8' Mikelatos; 14', 36' Sofoulis; 35' Rizos	Referee: Vladimir Tashkov (Bulgaria)

1 August 2021 3rd place match	Czech Republic	1–5	Kazakhstan
17:15	Valeš 20'	Report	6' Demeshko; 14' Bogdanov; 15', 32' Azhikenov; 18' Kazybekov	Referee: Oleg Cebotari (Moldova)

1 August 2021 Stage final	Moldova	4–1	Estonia
18:30	Ignat 6', 35'; Istrati 21'; Cojocari 23'	Report	33' Ed. Stüf	Referee: Roman Borisov (Russia)

=== Final standings ===
Key:	Qualified for the Promotion Final

Pos	Team
1	Moldova
2	Estonia
3	Kazakhstan
4	Czech Republic
5	Greece
6	Slovakia
7	Lithuania
8	Bulgaria
9	Romania
10	Sweden
11	Norway

=== Awards ===
The following were presented after the conclusion of the final day's matches.

Stage Winners trophy	Top scorer(s)		Best player	Best goalkeeper
Moldova	(Czech Republic) Lukáš Trampota	7 goals	(Moldova) Andrei Negara	(Moldova) Ruslan Istrati

== Promotion Final (Figueira da Foz, 9–12 September) ==
The top seven teams from Division B and the team bottom of Division A played in the Promotion Final; the winner earned a place in Division A next season.

=== Qualified teams ===
The team in green attempted to retain their position in Division A, having finished as the worst team of Division A's regular season event.

Slovakia originally qualified, but withdrew "at the last minute" for undisclosed reasons; Sweden replaced them as lucky losers.

- Moldova
- Estonia
- Kazakhstan
- Czech Republic
- Greece
- ~~Slovakia^{1}~~ Sweden^{1}
- Lithuania^{1}
- Turkey (Last place, Division A)

Notes:

1. First appearance in Promotion Final

=== Group stage ===
Key: Advance to –	Final /	3rd place match /	5th place match /	7th place match

==== Group 1 ====
Pos	Team	Pld	W	W+	WP	L	GF	GA	GD	Pts
1	Turkey	3	2	0	0	1	16	10	+6	6
2	Greece	3	2	0	0	1	14	13	+1	6
3	Kazakhstan	3	1	0	0	2	7	14	–7	3
4	Lithuania	3	1	0	0	2	8	8	0	3

Turkey & Greece; Kazakhstan & Lithuania are ranked based on their head-to-head results

9 September 2021	Kazakhstan	2–4	Greece	Main stadium
09:15	Perevyortov 7'; Makagon 21'	Report	Katsoulis 4', 15', 36'; Triantafyllidis 23'	Referee: Fiammetta Susanna (Italy)

9 September 2021	Lithuania	3–0	Turkey	Main stadium
10:30	Makutunovičius 26', 36'; Lebedev 29'	Report		Referee: Csaba Baghy (Hungary)

10 September 2021	Kazakhstan	3–1	Lithuania	Pitch 2
09:15	Chornyy 8'; Perevyortov 14', 35'	Report	Makutunovičius 2'	Referee: Torsten Guenther (Germany)

10 September 2021	Turkey	7–5	Greece	Main stadium
10:30	Volkan 7'; Keskin 11', 30'; Efe 16'; Ömer 23'; Semih 27'; Bariş 36'	Report	Triantafyllidis 10', 29'; Mikelatos 28', 34', 35'	Referee: Wilson Castanheira (Portugal)

11 September 2021	Greece	5–4	Lithuania	Main stadium
09:15	Katsoulis 11', 26', 26'; Nikolaou 27'; Triantafyllidis 33'	Report	Giedraitis 11'; Navickas 19', 22'; Makutunovičius 24'	Referee: Saverio Bottalico (Italy)

11 September 2021	Turkey	9–2	Kazakhstan	Main stadium
10:30	Serkan 5'; S. Ahmet 7'; Bariş 10', 13', 26'; Keskin 18', 28'; Volkan 23'; Semih 34'	Report	Yershin 31'; Gulyy 33'	Referee: Lukasz Ostrowski (Poland)

==== Group 2 ====
Pos	Team	Pld	W	W+	WP	L	GF	GA	GD	Pts
1	Estonia	3	3	0	0	0	15	6	+9	9
2	Moldova	3	2	0	0	1	10	8	+2	6
3	Czech Republic	3	0	0	1	2	8	11	–3	1
4	Sweden	3	0	0	0	3	9	17	–8	0

9 September 2021	Sweden	3–5	Moldova	Pitch 2
09:15	Kettler 21'; Bruzelius 35'; Bolander 35'	Report	Podlesnov 6'; Graur 20'; Ignat 23'; Gurgurov 28'; Pușcă 29'	Referee: Annett Unterbeck (Germany)

9 September 2021	Estonia	4–2	Czech Republic	Pitch 2
10:30	Marmor 5'; Munskind 11'; Lepik 23'; Ed. Stüf 35'	Report	Trampota 20'; Radosta 34'	Referee: Torsten Guenther (Germany)

10 September 2021	Moldova	2–1	Czech Republic	Main stadium
09:15	Ignat 17', 28'	Report	Borovička 16'	Referee: Cristobal Montoro (Spain)

10 September 2021	Estonia	7–1	Sweden	Pitch 2
10:30	Marmor 5', 9'; Munskind 7'; Mäeorg 21'; Lepik 23', 24'; Alaväli 27'	Report	Kettler 3'	Referee: Malte Gerhardt (Germany)

11 September 2021	Moldova	3–4	Estonia	Pitch 2
09:15	Gurjui 5'; Graur 7'; Podlesnov 16'	Report	Kotter 1'; Lepik 19', 19'; Nõmmiko 24'	Referee: Viktor Listratov (Russia)

11 September 2021	Czech Republic	3–3 (a.e.t.) (5–3 p)	Sweden	Pitch 2
10:30	Bruzelius 8' (o.g.); Trampota 13'; Radosta 36'	Report	Gustafsson 15'; Kettler 17'; Palmén 36'	Referee: Matthieu Dor (France)

=== Play-off stage ===
==== Seventh place play-off ====
12 September 2021
08:45

Lithuania	4–3	Sweden
Navickas 8', 22'; Petrauskas 17'; Plytnikas 36'	Report	Bruzelius 5'; Malmström 9'; Turesson 12'

Pitch 2
Referee: Fiammetta Susanna (Italy)

==== Fifth place play-off ====
12 September 2021
11:30

Kazakhstan	2–9	Czech Republic
Makagon 28'; Makazhanov 33'	Report	Bártl 6'; Jeřábek 12', 20'; Huráb 13', 25'; Trampota 16', 36'; Karpíšek 19'; Makagon 33' (o.g.)

Pitch 2
Referee: Wilson Castanheira (Portugal)

==== Third place play-off ====
12 September 2021
10:00

Greece	2–5	Moldova
Katsoulis 17', 24'	Report	Ignat 6', 22'; Gurjui 17'; Gurgurov 30'; Negara 34'

Main stadium
Referee: Vladimir Tashkov (Bulgaria)

==== Promotion play-off final ====
12 September 2021
11:30

Turkey	3–4	Estonia
Bariş 1', 29'; Volkan 28'	Report	Marmor 10'; S. Ahmet 23' (o.g.); Alaväli 28'; Lepik 32'

Main stadium
Referee: Torsten Guenther (Germany)

=== Final standings ===
By winning the event, Estonia earned promotion to Division A for the first time, having previously lost the final twice in 2015 and 2017. In losing the final, Turkey failed to defend their Division A status and were relegated to Division B for 2022, ending a four-year stay in the top tier.

Pos	Team	Outcome
1	Estonia	Promoted to 2022 EBSL Division A
2	Turkey	Relegated to 2022 EBSL Division B
3	Moldova	Remain in Division B
4	Greece	Remain in Division B
5	Czech Republic	Remain in Division B
6	Kazakhstan	Remain in Division B
7	Lithuania	Remain in Division B
8	Sweden	Remain in Division B

== Superfinal (Figueira da Foz, 9–12 September) ==
Matches are listed as local time in Figueira da Foz, WEST (UTC+1).

The winners of the Superfinal were crowned 2021 EBSL champions.

=== Qualified teams ===
The top eight teams from Division A's regular season event qualified for the Superfinal:

- Russia
- Portugal (hosts)
- Italy
- Spain
- Switzerland
- Ukraine
- Belarus
- Poland

=== Group stage ===
Key: Advance to –	Final /	3rd place match /	5th place match /	7th place match /	(H) Hosts

==== Group 1 ====
Pos	Team	Pld	W	W+	WP	L	GF	GA	GD	Pts
1	Portugal (H)	3	3	0	0	0	16	10	+6	9
2	Italy	3	2	0	0	1	15	12	+3	6
3	Switzerland	3	1	0	0	2	12	16	–4	3
4	Ukraine	3	0	0	0	3	14	19	–5	0

9 September 2021	Italy	7–3	Switzerland
13:15	Gori 3', 8', 32'; Casapieri 15'; Zurlo 16', 28'; Frainetti 33'	Report	Steinemann 17'; Hodel 26'; Stankovic 35'	Referee: Lukasz Ostrowski (Poland)

9 September 2021	Ukraine	5–7	Portugal
18:30	Voitenko 16'; Korniichuk 20'; Shcherytsia 20', 34'; Pashko 23'	Report	Jordan 1', 16', 36'; L. Martins 15', 22', 24', 27'	Referee: Vladimir Tashkov (Bulgaria)

10 September 2021	Italy	5–3	Ukraine
13:15	Zurlo 5', 16'; Voitenko 13' (o.g.); Gori 19', 25'	Report	Zborovskyi 11', 30'; Voitenko 35'	Referee: Csaba Baghy (Hungary)

10 September 2021	Portugal	3–2	Switzerland
18:30	Lourenço 5'; L. Martins 28'; Von 32'	Report	Hodel 6'; Stankovic 32'	Referee: Viktor Listratov (Russia)

11 September 2021	Switzerland	7–6	Ukraine
13:15	Shcherytsia 1' (o.g.); Stankovic 1', 14', 35'; Borer 14', 24'; Hodel 32'	Report	Zborovskyi 2', 24'; A. Borsuk 8'; I. Borsuk 30'; Shcherytsia 33'; Voitenko 36'	Referee: Vladimir Tashkov (Russia)

11 September 2021	Portugal	6–3	Italy
15:45	Jordan 2', 34'; L. Martins 14', 26'; M. Pintado 31'; B. Torres 35'	Report	Giordani 9'; Zurlo 35', 36'	Referee: Lukasz Ostrowski (Poland)

==== Group 2 ====
Pos	Team	Pld	W	W+	WP	L	GF	GA	GD	Pts
1	Belarus	3	2	0	1	0	12	6	+6	7
2	Spain	3	2	0	0	1	11	11	0	6
3	Russia	3	1	0	0	2	17	13	+4	3
4	Poland	3	0	0	0	3	5	15	–10	0

9 September 2021	Spain	0–4	Belarus
14:30		Report	Novikau 15'; Ryabko 17', 26'; Drozd 23'	Referee: Sergio Gomes (Portugal)

9 September 2021	Poland	2–7	Russia
17:00	Brochocki 18'; Klawikowski 29'	Report	Nikonorov 1', 32'; Paporotnyi 4'; Parkhomenko 9', 10'; Makarov 16'; Zemskov 28'	Referee: Saverio Bottalico (Italy)

10 September 2021	Spain	5–2	Poland
14:30	Eduard 14', 15', 25'; Chiky 15'; Arias 16'	Report	Jesionowski 1'; Petrasyak 26'	Referee: Torsten Guenther (Germany)

10 September 2021	Russia	5–5 (a.e.t.) (2–4 p)	Belarus
17:00	Zemskov 1'; Nikonorov 17', 31'; Paporotnyi 18'; Shkarin 24'	Report	Mahaletski 1'; Parkhomenko 5' (o.g.); Hardzetski 8'; Kanstantsinau 26'; Novikau 31'	Referee: Vitalij Gomolko (Lithuania)
	Penalties
	Fedorov (penalty missed); Paporotnyi (penalty scored); Novikov (penalty scored); Makarov (penalty missed)		(penalty scored) Hardzetski; (penalty scored) Chaikouski; (penalty missed) Piatrouski; (penalty scored) Drozd; (penalty scored) Novikau

11 September 2021	Belarus	3–1	Poland
14:30	Ryabko 9'; Chaikouski 11', 20'	Report	Chaikouski 33' (o.g.)	Referee: Sergio Gomes (Portugal)

11 September 2021	Russia	5–6	Spain
17:00	Nikonorov 2', 27'; Kosharnyi 9'; Fedorov 16'; Shkarin 17'	Report	Chiky 1', 13', 26'; Arias 8', 22'; Eduard 20'	Referee: Saverio Bottalico (Italy)

=== Play-off stage ===
==== Seventh place play-off ====
12 September 2021
08:45

Poland	3–7	Ukraine
Baran 1', 30'; Bistuła 33'	Report	A. Borsuk 11'; I. Borsuk 16'; Voitenko 23'; Shcherytsia 23', 26'; Voitok 25', 35'

Referee: Wilson Castanheira (Portugal)

==== Fifth place play-off ====
12 September 2021
12:45

Russia	12–4	Switzerland
Parkhomenko 1'; Nikonorov 4', 20', 23', 26'; N. Kryshanov 7'; Zemskov 8', 18'; Paporotnyi 9', 13'; Kotenev 29', 36'	Report	Stankovic 2'; Borer 16', 16'; Spacca 22'

Referee: Matthieu Dor (France)

==== Third place play-off ====
12 September 2021
14:00

Spain	3–5	Italy
Antonio 3'; P. Perez 5'; Cintas 33'	Report	Gori 7', 23', 24', 29'; Marinai 16'

Referee: Malte Gerhardt (Germany)

==== Superfinal match ====
12 September 2021
18:00

Belarus	4–7	Portugal
Ryabko 26'; Chaikouski 26'; Novikau 27'; Piatrouski 30'	Report	L. Martins 10', 12'; Jordan 10', 21'; Pinhal 17'; Lourenço 25', 26'

Referee: Lukasz Ostrowski (Poland)

=== Awards ===
==== Winners trophy ====
2021 Euro Beach Soccer League
champions

Portugal
Eighth title

==== Individual awards ====
Awarded for feats achieved in the Superfinal only

Top scorer(s)
(Russia) Boris Nikonorov
10 goals
Best player
(Portugal) Léo Martins
Best goalkeeper
(Belarus) Kanstantsin Mahaletski

=== Final standings ===
Pos	Team	Result
1	Portugal	EBSL Champions (8th title)
2	Belarus	Runners-up
3	Italy	Third place
4	Spain	
5	Russia	
6	Switzerland	
7	Ukraine	
8	Poland	

== Top scorers ==
The following tables list the top 12 scorers in Division A and in Division B, including goals scored in both the regular and post season events.

Note there are no awards presented for these season-encompassing scoring feats, the tables are for statistical purposes only. Scoring awards were bestowed per stage, with the primary award that which was presented in the Superfinal. Goals scored by Turkish players in the Promotion Final are not counted towards either table.

=== Division A ===
Rank	Player	Pld	Goals
1	(Italy) Gabriele Gori	7	16
2	(Portugal) Léo Martins	7	14
3	(Russia) Boris Nikonorov	7	12
4	(Switzerland) Philipp Borer	6	11
5	(Italy) Emmanuele Zurlo	7	9
5	(Poland) Patryk Pietrasiak	7	9
7	(Ukraine) Dmytro Voitenko	7	8
7	(Russia) Fedor Zemskov	7	8
9	(Portugal) Jordan Santos	4	7
9	(Switzerland) Dejan Stankovic	6	7
11	(Ukraine) Oleg Zborovskyi	6	6
11	(Switzerland) Glenn Hodel	7	6
11	(Belarus) Anatoliy Ryabko	7	6

Sources: Stage 1, Superfinal

=== Division B ===
Rank	Player	Pld	Goals
1	(Greece) Andreas Katsoulis	9	13
2	(Czech Republic) Lukáš Trampota	9	11
3	(Estonia) Kristian Marmor	9	9
4	(Moldova) Nicolae Ignat	8	8
5	(Moldova) Andrei Negara	8	6
5	(Lithuania) Elvinas Navickas	8	6
5	(Greece) Dimitrios Mikelatos	9	6
5	(Estonia) Sander Lepik	9	6
5	(Greece) Theofilos Triantafyllidis	9	6
10	(Bulgaria) Filip Filipov	4	5
10	(Czech Republic) Daniel Valeš	7	5
10	(Kazakhstan) Dmitriy Perevyortov	8	5
10	(Moldova) Grigore Cojocari	9	5

Sources: Stage 2 (note that Kazakh scorers are missing from this source), Promotion Final

== See also ==
- 2021 Women's Euro Beach Soccer League
