= Marmor =

Marmor is a form of marble. It may refer to:

- Marmor, Queensland, a town in Queensland, Australia
- Marmorie, or Marmor, a warhorse in the French epic The Song of Roland

== People ==
- Andrei Marmor (born 1959), Israeli philosopher
- Judd Marmor (1910–2003) American psychiatrist
- Kristian Marmor (born 1987), Estonian footballer
- Arnold Marmor (1927-1988), writer of sci-fi, erotica (50s, 60s)

== See also ==
- Marmora (disambiguation)
