= Chiky Ardil =

Brazilian beach soccer player

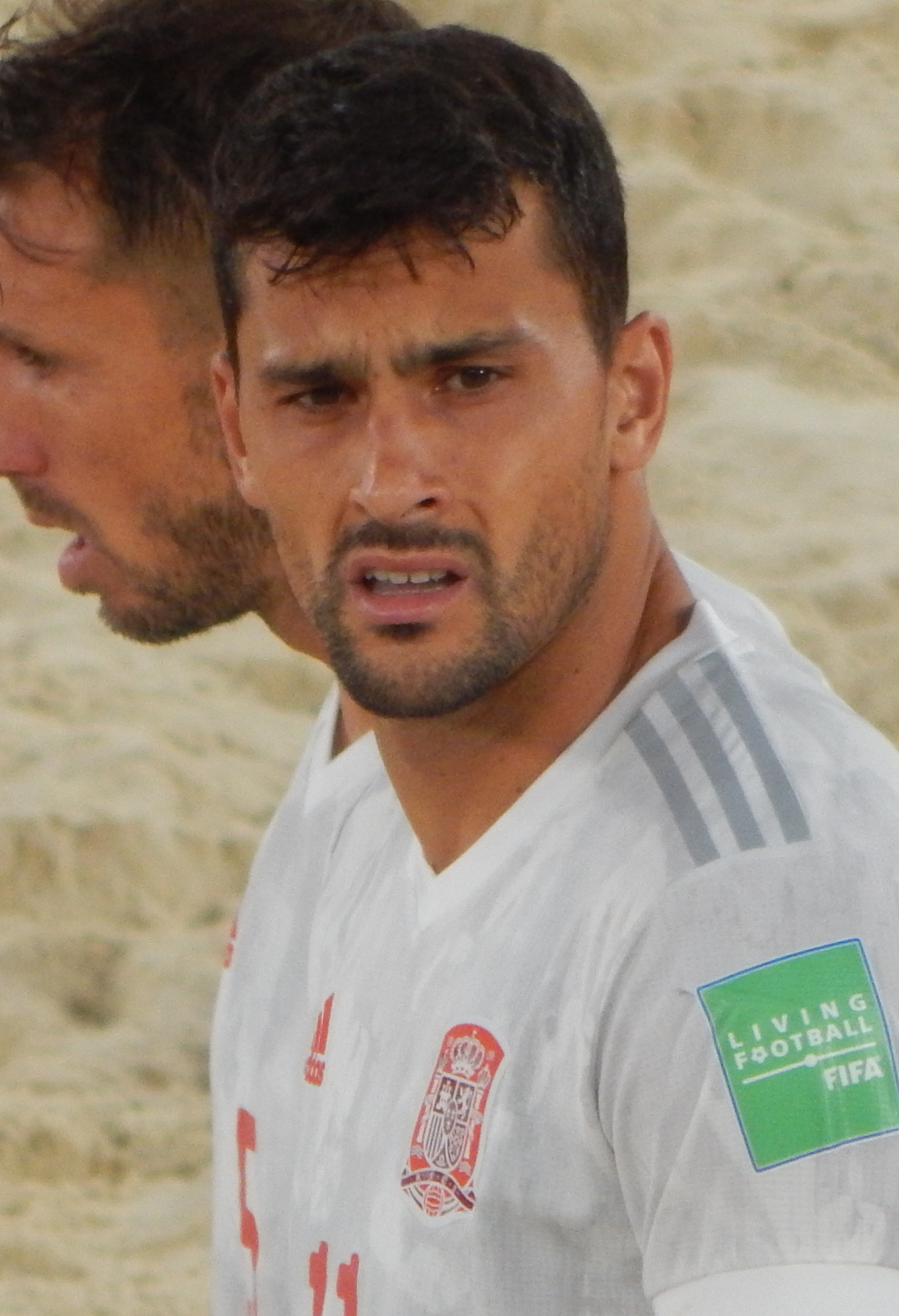
- Chiky with Spain at the 2021 World Cup

Personal information
- Full name: Salvador Ardil Navarro
- Date of birth: 17 April 1988 (age 38)
- Place of birth: Mazarrón, Spain
- Height: 1.83 m (6 ft 0 in)
- Position: Forward

International career
Years	Team	Apps	(Gls)
2013–	Spain		

Salvador Ardil Navarro (born 17 April 1988), better known as Chiky Ardil, is a Spanish beach soccer player who plays as a forward. He has appeared at two editions of the FIFA Beach Soccer World Cup (2015 and 2021) representing the Spain national team; at the European qualifying tournament for the latter, he won the MVP award and was named as one of the best three players in the world in 2022. His younger brother, David, also plays for Spain.

== Career ==
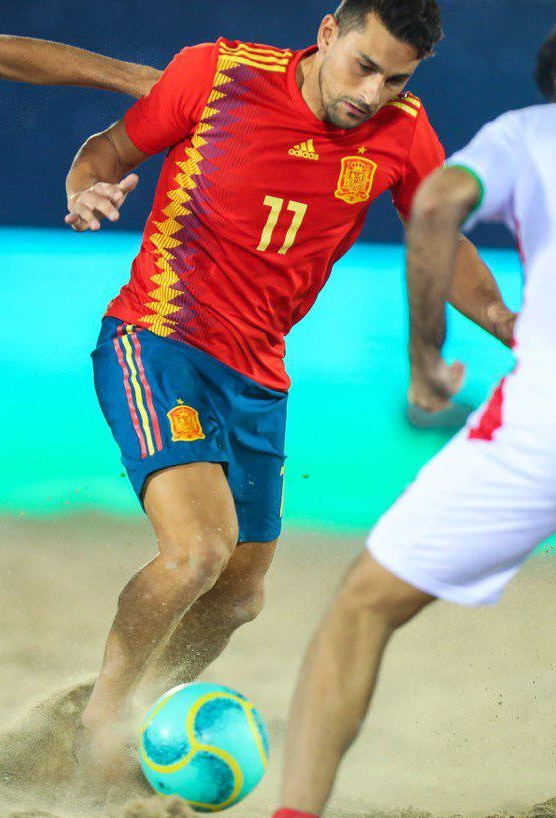
Chiky playing for Spain at the 2019 Intercontinental Cup

Salvador believes his nickname "Chiky" originates from when he was a toddler, and considerably smaller than his three other siblings. "Chiky" is a truncating of the Spanish word "chiquitín", meaning tiny.

He began playing futsal aged five before quickly switching to association football under the wing of his older brother, Raúl. Chiky ultimately established himself as a footballer in the third tier of Spanish football, having spells at multiple clubs including Lorca Deportiva, CD Bala Azul, Granada 74, Rayo Majadahonda, Pinatar CF and Águilas CF.

Chiky eventually accepted an invite from friends to partake in a beach soccer tournament in his hometown of Mazarrón. Having enjoyed it, Chiky and his team began taking part regularly in tournaments in Murcia, Alicante and Valencia. In 2013, after a tournament in Andalusia, he was called up to the Murcian regional team. His first tournament with the team was a success, in which he scored 18 goals; Spain coach Joaquín Alonso was impressed and called Chiky up to the national team. Chiky debuted for Spain at stage 5 of the 2013 Euro Beach Soccer League in Moscow, however he was ultimately not selected for the 2013 World Cup later that year. In 2014, Chiky was called back to the national team following a runners-up finish with Bala Azul in the Spanish National Beach Soccer League. After qualifying for the 2015 World Cup, Chiky received a special reception by the Mayor of Mazarrón at the town hall.

Since 2017, Chiky has found himself amongst the awards: his overhead kick against Greece during the 2017 Euro Beach Soccer League was nominated for best goal of the year, whilst he claimed his first individual international award in 2018 when he was top scorer at the Nazaré stage of the 2018 Euro Beach Soccer League; he was nominated for best beach soccer goal of the year again in 2019. In 2021, he was deemed MVP of the UEFA qualifiers for the FIFA World Cup, something he called "a landmark moment" in his career. He was subsequently received by the Mayor of Mazarrón again before leaving to play for Spain at the 2021 World Cup; at said tournament, he was Spain's top scorer with six goals. Chiky's reputation peaked in 2022 aged 34 when he scooped multiple individual accolades at tournaments, three recognitions at that year's Beach Soccer Stars awards (including being voted as one of the world's three best players), and became European club champion with Benfica Loures at the 2022 Euro Winners Cup.

He continues to play football in the Spanish third tier, for Mazarrón FC. He claims he has had to make "a lot of sacrifice[s]" in order to be able to play both sports, including performing double training sessions, one for each sport. He claims he will give up football to focus on beach soccer when Mazarrón FC no longer want his service.

== Statistics ==
Note: Some of the sources of these statistics may have counted an appearance when the player was actually an unused substitute.

Country

Competition	Year	Apps	Goals	Ref.
FIFA Beach Soccer World Cup	(Portugal) 2015	3	0	
FIFA Beach Soccer World Cup	(Russia) 2021	4	6	
Total		7	6	—

Competition	Year	Apps	Goals	Ref.
FIFA Beach Soccer World Cup qualification (UEFA)	(Italy) 2014	6	4	
FIFA Beach Soccer World Cup qualification (UEFA)	(Italy) 2016	8	7	
FIFA Beach Soccer World Cup qualification (UEFA)	(Russia) 2019	7	7	
FIFA Beach Soccer World Cup qualification (UEFA)	(Portugal) 2021	6	6	
FIFA Beach Soccer World Cup qualification (UEFA)	(Azerbaijan) 2023	4	4	
Total		31	28	—

Competition	Season	Apps	Goals	Ref.
Euro Beach Soccer League
Euro Beach Soccer League	2013	3	1	
Euro Beach Soccer League	2014	4	0	
Euro Beach Soccer League	2015	—	—	
Euro Beach Soccer League	2016	2	2	
Euro Beach Soccer League	2017	10	10	
Euro Beach Soccer League	2018	10	10	
Euro Beach Soccer League	2019	7	10	
Euro Beach Soccer League	2020	—	—	
Euro Beach Soccer League	2021	7	5	
Euro Beach Soccer League	2022	6	5	
Euro Beach Soccer League	2023	5	5	
Total		54	48	—

Club

Tournament	Year	Club	Apps	Goals	Ref.
Euro Winners Cup
Euro Winners Cup	(Italy) 2015	(Spain) Bala Azul	4	6	
Euro Winners Cup	(Italy) 2016	(Spain) Melistar	4	6	
Euro Winners Cup	(Portugal) 2017	(Spain) Bala Azul	9	15	
Euro Winners Cup	(Portugal) 2018	(Spain) Melistar	6	9	
Euro Winners Cup	(Portugal) 2019	(Spain) Bala Azul	4	7	
Euro Winners Cup	(Portugal) 2020	(Portugal) O Sótão Norte	6	9	
Euro Winners Cup	(Portugal) 2021	(Portugal) Benfica Loures	7	12	
Euro Winners Cup	(Portugal) 2022	(Portugal) Benfica Loures	7	5	
Euro Winners Cup	(Portugal) 2023	(Portugal) O Sótão	9	4	
Total			56	73	—

== Honours ==
The following is a selection, not an exhaustive list, of the major international honours Chiky has achieved with Spain:

=== Team ===
- UEFA qualifiers for the FIFA Beach Soccer World Cup
  - Winner (1): 2021
- Intercontinental Cup
  - Runner-up (1): 2019
- Euro Beach Soccer League
  - Runner-up (3): 2014, 2018, 2023
  - Third place (1): 2019
- European Games:
  - Silver medal (1): 2019
  - Bronze medal (1): 2023
- UEFA qualifiers for the World Beach Games
  - Winner (1): 2022
  - Runner-up (1): 2019
- Euro Beach Soccer Cup:
  - Winner (1): 2014
- Mundialito
  - Winner (1): 2022
  - Runner-up (1): 2018
- Mediterranean Beach Games
  - Gold medal (1): 2023
- Euro Winners Cup
  - Winner (1): 2022

=== Individual ===
- Beach Soccer Stars (3):
  - World's top 3 best players: 2022
  - World dream team: 2022
  - Goal of the year: 2022
- UEFA qualifiers for the FIFA Beach Soccer World Cup (1):
  - Best player: 2021
- Euro Beach Soccer League (1):
  - Regular season stages:
    - Top scorer: 2018 (x1)
- Intercontinental Cup (1):
  - Top scorer: 2021
- Mundialito (1):
  - Best player: 2022
- UEFA qualifiers for the World Beach Games (2):
  - Top scorer: 2022
  - Best player: 2022
