= 2021 FIFA Beach Soccer World Cup qualification (UEFA) =

FIFA Beach Soccer World Cup Qualifier - Europe - Nazaré 2021

Tournament details
- Host country: Portugal
- City: Nazaré
- Dates: 17–27 June
- Teams: 21 (from 1 confederation)
- Venue: 1 (in 1 host city)

Final positions
- Champions: Spain (4th title)
- Runners-up: Ukraine
- Third place: Portugal
- Fourth place: Belarus

Tournament statistics
- Matches played: 56
- Goals scored: 426 (7.61 per match)

The 2021 FIFA Beach Soccer World Cup qualifiers for UEFA was a beach soccer tournament contested by European men's national teams who are members of UEFA that determined the four nations from Europe that qualified to the 2021 FIFA Beach Soccer World Cup in Russia.

The event, organised by Beach Soccer Worldwide (BSWW), took place in Nazaré, Portugal from 17 to 27 June 2021.

The tournament was a multi-stage competition, consisting of a first group stage, second group stage, knockout stage and placement matches.

Russia were the defending champions but did not enter this year's competition, having already qualified for the World Cup as hosts. The tournament was won by Spain, who, along with Ukraine, Portugal and Belarus earned qualification to the World Cup by finishing in the top four positions; Ukraine subsequently withdrew from the World Cup before it began and were replaced by Switzerland. (Note: As the runners-up and a quarter-final winner, Ukraine originally qualified for the World Cup. However, on 6 July, it was announced that the Ukrainian Association of Football had refused to sanction the participation of the team at the World Cup. It was reported that the decision was made as part of a wider sporting boycott of Russia by Ukrainian authorities due to ongoing war between the two states. As the next best-placed team in the qualifiers, Switzerland were chosen to replace Ukraine at the World Cup.)

== Format ==
The competition format was as follows:

The tournament started with a round-robin group stage; the lowest ranked ten teams entered at this point. Five nations, the group winners and best runners-up, advanced to the next round.

There was then a second round-robin group stage; the highest ranked 11 teams entered at this point. Plus the five qualifiers from the first group stage, a total of 16 teams competed during this round. The top two teams of each group (total of eight nations), advanced to the knockout stage.

The knockout stage began with the quarter-finals and ended with the final. The four winners of the quarter-final ties secured qualification to the World Cup; they also progressed to the semi-finals to continue to contest the tournament title.

The nations not advancing from the second group stage played in consolation matches to decide ninth through sixteenth place; the nations not advancing from the quarter-finals played in consolation matches to decide fifth through eighth place.

== Teams ==
21 teams entered the competition:

Entered at the first group stage

- Czech Republic
- Denmark
- England
- Estonia
- Kazakhstan
- Lithuania
- Moldova
- Norway
- Romania
- Sweden^{1}

Entered at the second group stage

- Azerbaijan
- Belarus
- France
- Germany
- Italy
- Poland
- Portugal
- Spain
- Switzerland
- Turkey
- Ukraine
Notes:

1. First appearance

== Draw ==
The draws for both the first and second group stages took place at 12:00 CEST on 4 June, at Beach Soccer Worldwide's headquarters in Barcelona, Spain. Its procedure was as follows:

First group stage

The ten teams entering the first group stage were drawn into two groups of three and one group of four. Firstly, the three highest ranked teams were seeded and one each automatically assigned to the head of one of the groups. The remaining seven teams were split into two pots of three and one pot of one, with the highest ranked teams placed in Pot 1 through to the lowest ranked placed in Pot 3.

From Pot 1, the first team drawn out was placed into Group A, second into B and third into C; they were allocated to position 2 in their respective groups. The teams from Pot 2 were drawn in the same manner; they were allocated to position 3 in their respective groups. The solo team in Pot 3 was drawn alongside a lot from an additional pot containing three lots marked with one of the names of the three groups, to determine which group it would be randomly placed in; it was allocated to position 4 in that group.

The composition of the seeds and pots is shown below:

Seeds	Pot 1	Pot 2	Pot 3
Czech Republic (36) (assigned to A1); England (43) (assigned to B1); Kazakhstan (44) (assigned to C1)	Norway (48); Romania (50); Lithuania (51)	Estonia (52); Moldova (54); Denmark (67)	Sweden (110)

Second group stage

The sixteen teams competing in the second group stage were drawn into four groups of four. Firstly, the four highest ranked teams of the 11 entering at this stage were seeded and one each automatically assigned to the head of one of the groups. The remaining seven teams entering at this stage plus the then unknown best qualifier from the first group stage were split into two pots of four, with the highest ranked teams placed in Pot 1 and the lowest ranked placed in Pot 2.

From Pot 1, the first team drawn out was placed into Group A, second into B and so on; they were allocated to position 2 in their respective groups. The teams from Pot 2 were drawn in the same manner; they were allocated to position 3 in their respective groups.

The composition of the seeds and pots is shown below:

Seeds	Pot 1	Pot 2
Portugal (1) (assigned to A1); Italy (3) (assigned to B1); Spain (5) (assigned to C1); Switzerland (8) (assigned to D1)	Belarus (15); Ukraine (18); France (22); Germany (28)	Poland (30); Azerbaijan (31); Turkey (34) (N/A) Best qualifier

The numbers in parentheses show the BSWW World Ranking of the teams as of December 2020, out of 120 nations.

== First group stage ==
Each team earns three points for a win in regulation time, two points for a win in extra time, one point for a win in a penalty shoot-out, and no points for a defeat.

All times are local, WEST (UTC+1). Kickoff times shown were those scheduled; actual times may have differed slightly.

=== Group A ===
Pos	Team	Pld	W	W+	WP	L	GF	GA	GD	Pts	Qualification
1	Norway	2	1	0	1	0	3	1	+2	4	Second group stage
2	Czech Republic	2	0	0	1	1	4	4	0	1	
3	Moldova	2	0	0	0	2	3	5	−2	0	

Source: BSWW
17 June 2021
14:00

Czech Republic	3–3 (a.e.t.)	Moldova
	Report
Penalties
	4–3

18 June 2021
14:00

Norway	2–0	Moldova
	Report

19 June 2021
14:00

Czech Republic	1–1 (a.e.t.)	Norway
	Report
Penalties
	3–5

=== Group B ===
Pos	Team	Pld	W	W+	WP	L	GF	GA	GD	Pts	Qualification
1	Romania	3	2	0	0	1	12	10	+2	6	Second group stage
2	Estonia	3	1	1	0	1	9	7	+2	5	Second group stage
3	England	3	1	0	1	1	6	6	0	4	
4	Sweden	3	0	0	0	3	6	10	−4	0	

Updated to match(es) played on 19 June 2021. Source: BSWW
17 June 2021
11:15

Romania	3–4 (a.e.t.)	Estonia
	Report

17 June 2021
15:30

Sweden	0–2	England
	Report

18 June 2021
11:15

Romania	5–4	Sweden
	Report

18 June 2021
15:30

England	2–2 (a.e.t.)	Estonia
	Report
Penalties
	4–1

19 June 2021
11:15

Estonia	3–2	Sweden
	Report

19 June 2021
15:30

England	2–4	Romania
	Report

=== Group C ===
Pos	Team	Pld	W	W+	WP	L	GF	GA	GD	Pts	Qualification
1	Denmark	2	2	0	0	0	9	7	+2	6	Second group stage
2	Kazakhstan	2	1	0	0	1	8	8	0	3	Second group stage
3	Lithuania	2	0	0	0	2	4	6	−2	0	

Source: BSWW
17 June 2021
10:00

Kazakhstan	5–6	Denmark
	Report

18 June 2021
10:00

Lithuania	2–3	Denmark
	Report

19 June 2021
10:00

Kazakhstan	3–2	Lithuania
	Report

=== Ranking of second-placed teams ===
Since Groups A and C consisted of just three teams, for the third placed team from Group B, their result against the team finishing in fourth place in their group was discounted for this ranking.

Pos	Grp	Team	Pld	W	W+	WP	L	GF	GA	GD	Pts	Qualification
1	C	Kazakhstan	2	1	0	0	1	8	8	0	3	Second group stage
2	B	Estonia	2	0	1	0	1	6	5	+1	2	Second group stage
3	A	Czech Republic	2	0	0	1	1	4	4	0	1	

Source: BSWW

== Second group stage ==
As per the regulations of the second group stage draw, the statistically best qualifier from the first group stage was automatically allocated to position B3; this was Denmark.

The other four qualifiers (Estonia, Kazakhstan, Norway and Romania) were placed into the groups via a draw, made after the conclusion of the first group stage. All four teams were placed in one pot. The first team drawn out was placed into Group A, second into B and so on; they were allocated to position 4 in their respective groups. 20 June was allocated as a rest day.

=== Group A ===
Pos	Team	Pld	W	W+	WP	L	GF	GA	GD	Pts	Qualification
1	Portugal (H)	3	3	0	0	0	12	5	+7	9	Knockout stage
2	Ukraine	3	2	0	0	1	13	7	+6	6	Knockout stage
3	Turkey	3	1	0	0	2	12	12	0	3	9th–12th place play-offs
4	Kazakhstan	3	0	0	0	3	5	18	−13	0	13th–16th place play-offs

Source: BSWW
(H) Host
21 June 2021
14:00

Ukraine	7–5	Turkey
	Report

21 June 2021
19:30

Kazakhstan	3–7	Portugal
	Report

22 June 2021
14:00

Ukraine	6–1	Kazakhstan
	Report

22 June 2021
19:30

Portugal	4–2	Turkey
	Report

23 June 2021
14:00

Turkey	5–1	Kazakhstan
	Report

23 June 2021
16:45

Portugal	1–0	Ukraine
	Report

=== Group B ===
Pos	Team	Pld	W	W+	WP	L	GF	GA	GD	Pts	Qualification
1	Italy	3	3	0	0	0	19	3	+16	9	Knockout stage
2	Germany	3	2	0	0	1	14	3	+11	6	Knockout stage
3	Romania	3	1	0	0	2	6	12	−6	3	9th–12th place play-offs
4	Denmark	3	0	0	0	3	3	24	−21	0	13th–16th place play-offs

Source: BSWW
21 June 2021
12:45

Germany	8–0	Denmark
	Report

21 June 2021
18:15

Romania	2–4	Italy
	Report

22 June 2021
12:45

Germany	5–0	Romania
	Report

22 June 2021
18:15

Italy	12–0	Denmark
	Report

23 June 2021
12:45

Denmark	3–4	Romania
	Report

23 June 2021
19:30

Italy	3–1	Germany
	Report

=== Group C ===
Pos	Team	Pld	W	W+	WP	L	GF	GA	GD	Pts	Qualification
1	Belarus	3	3	0	0	0	21	7	+14	9	Knockout stage
2	Spain	3	1	1	0	1	18	10	+8	5	Knockout stage
3	Poland	3	1	0	0	2	11	16	−5	3	9th–12th place play-offs
4	Norway	3	0	0	0	3	3	20	−17	0	13th–16th place play-offs

Source: BSWW
21 June 2021
11:15

Belarus	8–2	Poland
	Report

21 June 2021
16:45

Norway	0–8	Spain
	Report

22 June 2021
11:15

Belarus	9–2	Norway
	Report

22 June 2021
16:45

Spain	7–6 (a.e.t.)	Poland
	Report

23 June 2021
11:15

Poland	3–1	Norway
	Report

23 June 2021
15:30

Spain	3–4	Belarus
	Report

=== Group D ===
Pos	Team	Pld	W	W+	WP	L	GF	GA	GD	Pts	Qualification
1	Switzerland	3	3	0	0	0	26	14	+12	9	Knockout stage
2	Azerbaijan	3	2	0	0	1	11	11	0	6	Knockout stage
3	France	3	1	0	0	2	9	9	0	3	9th–12th place play-offs
4	Estonia	3	0	0	0	3	8	20	−12	0	13th–16th place play-offs

Source: BSWW
21 June 2021
10:00

France	0–2	Azerbaijan
	Report

21 June 2021
15:30

Estonia	4–12	Switzerland
	Report

22 June 2021
10:00

France	4–1	Estonia
	Report

22 June 2021
15:30

Switzerland	8–5	Azerbaijan
	Report

23 June 2021
10:00

Azerbaijan	4–3	Estonia
	Report

23 June 2021
18:15

Switzerland	6–5	France
	Report

== 13th–16th place play-offs ==
The teams finishing in fourth place in the groups of the second group stage faced each other in consolation matches to determine 13th through 16th place in the final standings.

13th–16th place semi-finals
24 June
Kazakhstan	2
Estonia	3
24 June
Denmark	5
Norway	3

13th place match
25 June
Estonia	6
Denmark	7
15th place match
25 June
Kazakhstan	2
Norway	7

=== Semi-finals ===
24 June 2021
16:45

Denmark	5–3	Norway
	Report

24 June 2021
19:30

Kazakhstan	2–3	Estonia
	Report

=== 15th place match ===
25 June 2021
10:00

Kazakhstan	2–7	Norway
	Report

=== 13th place match ===
25 June 2021
11:15

Estonia	6–7	Denmark
	Report

== 9th–12th place play-offs ==
The teams finishing in third place in the groups of the second group stage faced each other in consolation matches to determine 9th through 12th place in the final standings.

9th–12th place semi-finals
24 June
Turkey	5
France (a.e.t.)	6
24 June
Romania	3
Poland	8

9th place match
25 June
France (a.e.t.)	5
Poland	4
11th place match
25 June
Turkey	10
Romania	1

=== Semi-finals ===
24 June 2021
15:30

Turkey	5–6 (a.e.t.)	France
	Report

24 June 2021
18:15

Romania	3–8	Poland
	Report

=== 11th place match ===
25 June 2021
12:45

Turkey	10–1	Romania
	Report

=== 9th place match ===
25 June 2021
14:00

France	5–4 (a.e.t.)	Poland
	Report

== Knockout stage ==
June 24 is allocated as a rest day for the teams progressing to the knockout stage.

The draw for the quarter-finals was made on 19 June, before the second group stage commenced. Placeholders for the eight teams were split into two pots: Pot 1, containing placeholders for the group winners, and Pot 2, containing placeholders for the runners-up. For each tie, a team from Pot 1 was drawn against a team from Pot 2. The fixtures were allocated to the bracket from top to bottom in the order they were drawn.

5th place match
27 June
Switzerland (p)	5 (3)
Germany	5 (0)
7th place match
27 June
Azerbaijan	1
Italy	10

5th–8th place semi-finals
26 June
Switzerland	6
Azerbaijan	5
26 June
Germany (p)	3 (6)
Italy	3 (5)

Quarter-finals
25 June
Switzerland	5
Ukraine	6
25 June
Portugal	6
Azerbaijan	1
25 June
Belarus	5
Germany	1
25 June
Italy	4
Spain (a.e.t.)	5

Semi-finals
26 June
Ukraine (a.e.t.)	1
Portugal	0
26 June
Belarus	1
Spain	3

Final
27 June
Ukraine	2
Spain	5
3rd place match
27 June
Portugal	6
Belarus	5

=== Quarter-finals ===
Winners qualify for 2021 FIFA Beach Soccer World Cup.

25 June 2021
15:30

Belarus	5–1	Germany
	Report

25 June 2021
16:45

Switzerland	5–6	Ukraine
	Report

25 June 2021
18:15

Italy	4–5 (a.e.t)	Spain
	Report

25 June 2021
19:30

Portugal	6–1	Azerbaijan
	Report

=== Semi-finals ===
==== 5th–8th place ====
26 June 2021
15:30

Germany	3–3 (a.e.t.)	Italy
	Report
Penalties
	6–5

26 June 2021
16:45

Switzerland	6–5	Azerbaijan
	Report

==== 1st–4th place ====
26 June 2021
18:15

Belarus	1–3	Spain
	Report

26 June 2021
19:30

Ukraine	1–0 (a.e.t.)	Portugal
	Report

=== Finals ===
==== 7th place match ====
27 June 2021
15:30

Italy	10–1	Azerbaijan
	Report

==== 5th place match ====
27 June 2021
18:15

Germany	5–5 (a.e.t.)	Switzerland
	Report
Penalties
	0–3

==== 3rd place match ====
27 June 2021
17:00

Belarus	5–6	Portugal
	Report

==== Final ====
27 June 2021
19:30

Spain	5–2	Ukraine
	Report

== Awards ==
=== Winners ===
2021 FIFA Beach Soccer World Cup qualifiers for UEFA
champions

Spain
Fourth title

=== Individual awards ===
The following awards were given at the conclusion of the tournament.

Best player
(Spain) Chiky Ardil
Top scorer(s)
(Switzerland) Noël Ott	(Switzerland) Phillip Borer
10 goals
Best goalkeeper
(Ukraine) Andreii Nerush

== Final standings ==
Key:
Qualified for the 2021 FIFA Beach Soccer World Cup

Rank	Team
1st place, gold medalist(s)	Spain
2nd place, silver medalist(s)	Ukraine
3rd place, bronze medalist(s)	Portugal
4	Belarus
5	Switzerland
6	Germany
7	Italy
8	Azerbaijan
9	France
10	Poland
11	Turkey
12	Romania
13	Denmark
14	Estonia
15	Norway
16	Kazakhstan
17–21	Czech Republic
17–21	England
17–21	Lithuania
17–21	Moldova
17–21	Sweden

=== Qualified teams to the FIFA Beach Soccer World Cup ===
The following five teams from UEFA qualify for the 2021 FIFA Beach Soccer World Cup.

Team	Qualified on	Previous appearances in FIFA Beach Soccer World Cup^{1} only FIFA era (since 2005)
Russia	Host nation	7 (2007, 2008, 2009, **2011**, **2013**, 2015, 2019)
Belarus	25 June 2021	1 (2019)
Portugal	25 June 2021	9 (2005, 2006, 2007, 2008, 2009, 2011, **2015**, 2017, **2019**)
Spain	25 June 2021	7 (2005, 2006, 2007, 2008, 2009, 2013, 2015)
~~Ukraine~~	~~25 June 2021~~	~~3 (2005, 2011, 2013)~~
Switzerland	6 July 2021	5 (2009, 2011, 2015, 2017, 2019)

^{1} Bold indicates champions for that year. Italic indicates hosts for that year.
