= Sweden national beach soccer team =

Sweden
- Nickname(s): Blågult (The Blue-Yellow)
- Association: Svenska Fotbollförbundet (SvFF)
- Confederation: UEFA (Europe)
- Head coach: Mathias Granberg
- FIFA code: SWE
- BSWW ranking: 78 ▲1 (1 June 2026)
First colours
Second colours

First international
- Ukraine 8–2 Sweden (Palma de Mallorca, Spain; 6 August 2004)

Biggest win
- Kazakhstan 3–5 Sweden (Chișinău, Moldova; 29 July 2021)

Biggest defeat
- Ukraine 8–2 Sweden (Palma de Mallorca, Spain; 6 August 2004); Sweden 3–9 England (Malmö, Sweden; 14 July 2013); Estonia 7–1 Sweden (Figueira da Foz, Portugal; 10 September 2021)

World Cup
- Appearances: 0
- Best result: None

Euro Beach Soccer League
- Appearances: 2 (first in 2004)
- Best result: 10th place, Division B (2021)

Sweden national beach soccer team represents Sweden in international beach soccer competitions and is controlled by the Svenska Fotbollförbundet (SvFF), the governing body for football in Sweden.

The current Swedish national beach soccer team is an unofficial national team. The team consists off players from the Swedish beach soccer team Bemmania FC who got the mandate to represent Sweden in international tournaments 2021. The unofficial national team has a mandate to represent Sweden during a trial period while the Swedish Football Association evaluates whether Sweden should have an official national team.

So far the trial period has consisted of 12 games played with 10 losses and only 2 victories for the Swedish team. In 2021, the team has scored 27 goals and conceded 42 goals with a total goal difference of minus 15.

== Squad ==
Correct as of July 2021
Note: Flags indicate national team as defined under FIFA eligibility rules; some limited exceptions apply. Players may hold more than one non-FIFA nationality.

No.	Pos.	Nation	Player
1	GK	SWE	Filip Malmstrom
2	DF	SWE	Eril Gustafsson
3	DF	SWE	Jesper Bolander
4	DF	SWE	Nils Lavah
5	DF	SWE	Marcus Kettler
6	FW	SWE	Jesper Sommensjo
7	FW	SWE	Martin Bruzelius

No.	Pos.	Nation	Player
8	FW	SWE	Daniel Granberg
9	DF	SWE	Simon Turesson
10	FW	SWE	William Palmen
11	FW	SWE	Klas Robertsson
13	FW	SWE	Amo Cartwright
19	GK	SWE	Felix Borgqvist

Head coach: Mathias Granberg

== Results ==
=== All-time record ===
as of 4 October 2021

Tournament	App	Pld	W	W+	WP	L	GF	GA	GD	Pts
BSWW Tour events	1	3	0	0	0	3	12	25	–13	0
Euro Beach Soccer League	3	11	2	0	0	9	25	47	–22	6
FIFA World Cup qualifiers	1	3	0	0	0	3	6	10	–4	0
Totals	5	17	2	0	0	15	43	82	–39	6

=== Matches ===
6 August 2004 2004 EBSL, Division C, 1st round	Ukraine	8–2	Sweden	Palma de Mallorca, Spain
		Report	Hansson; Hamici

7 August 2004 2004 EBSL, Division C, 6th place match	Greece	7–2	Sweden	Palma de Mallorca, Spain
		Report	Maikkula; Hansson

12 July 2013 BSWW Tour: Sweden Cup	Sweden	3–8	Netherlands	Malmö, Sweden
	Almir; Saikou	Report	Van Den Ouweland; Klijbroek; Ax; Ran; Van Gessel; Koswal; Van Der Geest

13 July 2013 BSWW Tour: Sweden Cup	Sweden	6–8	Denmark	Malmö, Sweden
	Hussein; Chris; Saikou; Erik	Report	Raedkjaer; Dorph; Corfixen; Madsen; Stromberg; Jorgensen

14 July 2013 BSWW Tour: Sweden Cup	Sweden	3–9	England	Malmö, Sweden
	Chris; Pavel; Erik	Report	Clarke; Evans; Corbett; Webb; Bowes

17 June 2021 2021 World Cup qualifiers, group stage	Sweden	0–2	England	Nazaré, Portugal
15:30		Report	Lawson	Stadium: Estádio do Viveiro

18 June 2021 2021 World Cup qualifiers, group stage	Romania	5–4	Sweden	Nazaré, Portugal
11:15	Bolat; Boata; Andrei Paul	Report	Bolander; Bruzelius; Malmstrom; Sommensjo	Stadium: Estádio do Viveiro

19 June 2021 2021 World Cup qualifiers, group stage	Estonia	3–2	Sweden	Nazaré, Portugal
11:15	Lepik; Marmor; Remmelgas	Report	Bolander	Stadium: Estádio do Viveiro

28 July 2021 2021 EBSL, Division B, regular season	Sweden	1–4	Greece	Chișinău, Moldova
17:15	Granberg 36'	Report	6' Triantafyllidis; 18' Mikelatos; 33', 36' Katsoulis	Stadium: FMF Beach Soccer Arena; Referee: Oleg Cebotari (Moldova)

29 July 2021 2021 EBSL, Division B, regular season	Kazakhstan	3–5	Sweden	Chișinău, Moldova
13:15	Demeshko 18'; Perevyortov 25'; Yershin 26'	Report	2' Turesson; 19' Granberg; 22' Malmström; 29' Lavah; 36' Kettler	Stadium: FMF Beach Soccer Arena; Referee: Piotr Stoianov (Moldova)

30 July 2021 2021 EBSL, Division B, regular season	Lithuania	3–2	Sweden	Chișinău, Moldova
13:15	Meškinis 28'; Smolkovas 31'; Levonauskas 33'	Report	5' Gustafsson; 24' Palmen	Stadium: FMF Beach Soccer Arena; Referee: Roman Borisov (Russia)

31 July 2021 2021 EBSL, Division B, regular season	Sweden	3–2	Norway	Chișinău, Moldova
11:00	Turesson 13', 23'; Granberg 35'	Report	9' Jalland; 22' Elverum	Stadium: FMF Beach Soccer Arena; Referee: Ago Kärtmann (Estonia)

1 August 2021 2021 EBSL, Division B, regular season	Sweden	0–1	Romania	Chișinău, Moldova
13:15		Report	26' Voica	Stadium: FMF Beach Soccer Arena; Referee: Ozcan Sultanoglu (Turkey)

9 September 2021 2021 EBSL, Division B, Promotion final Group stage	Sweden	3–5	Moldova	Figueira da Foz, Portugal
09:15	(16-) Kettler; 26' Bruzelius; 26' Bolander	Report	7' Podelsnov; 14' Ignat; 17' Graur; 32' Pusca; 33' Gurgurov	Stadium: Pitch 2 Referee: Annett Unterbeck (Germany)

10 September 2021 2021 EBSL, Division B, Promotion final Group stage	Estonia	7–1	Sweden	Figueira da Foz, Portugal
10:30	4', 8' Marmor; 6' Munskind; 13', 14' Lepik; 16' Märeorg; 34' Alaväli	Report	10' Kettler	Stadium: Pitch 2 Referee: Malte Gerhardt(Germany)

11 September 2021 2021 EBSL, Division B, Promotion final Group stage	Czech Republic	3–3 (a.e.t.) (5–3 p)	Sweden	Figueira da Foz, Portugal
10:30	Bruzelius 8' (o.g.); Trampota 13'; Radosta 36'	Report	Gustafsson 15'; Kettler 17'; Palmén 36'	Stadium: Pitch 2 Referee: Matthieu Dor (France)

12 September 2021 2021 EBSL, Division B, Promotion final Seventh place face-off	Lithuania	4–3	Sweden	Figueira da Foz, Portugal
08:45	Navickas 8', 22'; Petrauskas 17'; Plytnikas 36'	Report	Bruzelius 5'; Malmström 9'; Turesson 12'	Stadium: Pitch 2 Referee: Fiammetta Susanna (Italy)
