= Marmara =

Marmara may refer to:

== Places ==
- Marmara, Greece (Sfakia), mountainous area on Crete
- Neos Marmaras, a village in Greece
- Marmara Town, a town in Nigeria
- Marmara (Lycia), a town of ancient Lycia, now in Turkey
- Marmara region, comprising 11 provinces of Turkey
  - Sea of Marmara, an inland sea to the south of Istanbul in Marmara Region
  - Marmara Island, an island in Balıkesir Province, Marmara Region
  - Marmara District, a district in Balıkesir Province, Marmara Region
- Lake Marmara, a lake in Manisa Province, Turkey
- Marmara Ereğlisi, a town in Tekirdağ Province, Turkey
- Marmara Sea, synonym of Sea of Marmara in Marmara Region

== Other uses ==
- Marmara (beer)
- Marmara (moth), a genus of moths
- Marmara (newspaper), a newspaper in Armenian language
- Marmara University
- Tour of Marmara, an international cycling tour in Marmara Region

== People with the surname ==
- Nilgün Marmara (1958–1987), Turkish poet
- Pembe Marmara (1925–1984), Turkish Cypriot poet

== See also ==
- Gölmarmara, a town and district in Manisa Province, in the Aegean Region of Turkey
- Marmora (disambiguation)
- MV Mavi Marmara
- RV TÜBİTAK Marmara, a research vessel
