= Kert Haavistu =

Estonian footballer

Personal information
- Full name: Kert Haavistu
- Date of birth: 18 January 1980 (age 46)
- Place of birth: Tallinn, then part of Estonian SSR, Soviet Union
- Height: 1.78 m (5 ft 10 in)
- Position: Midfielder

International career
| Years | Team | Apps | (Gls) |
| 1999–2004 | Estonia | 44 | (0) |
| 2008–2010 | Estonia (futsal) | 7 | (0) |
| 2008–2013 | Estonia (beach soccer) | | |

Managerial career
- 2010–2013: Estonia (futsal)
- 2009–2013: Estonia (beach soccer)

Kert Haavistu (born 18 January 1980) is a former Estonian professional footballer, who used to play in the Meistriliiga for FC Flora Tallinn and FC TVMK Tallinn. He played the position of midfielder and is 1.78 m (5 ft 10 in) tall and weighs 72 kg. He is also the former member of the Estonia national football team with 44 caps to his name.

He is the first Estonian footballer who has played in Estonia national team in football, futsal and beach soccer.

Haavistu has played beach soccer in S.C. Real/Triobet.

He has been the head coach of the Estonia national beach soccer team and Estonia national futsal team.

Haavistu has worked as a youth coach for Tallinna SC Real and now owns a restaurant in Malta.

== Personal ==
He has a younger brother, Mikk Haavistu, who also played football and beach soccer.
