= Marmora =

Marmora may refer to:

== Places ==
Canada

- Marmora, Ontario, a community in Hastings County
- Marmora and Lake, Ontario, a township in Hastings County

Greece

- Marmora, Greece, a village on the island of Paros, South Aegean

Italy

- Marmora, Piedmont, a comune in the Province of Cuneo

United States

- Marmora, New Jersey, a community in Cape May County

== People ==
- Alberto Ferrero La Marmora, an Italian naturalist
- Alfonso Ferrero La Marmora, an Italian politician
- Alessandro Ferrero La Marmora, an Italian general

== Other uses ==
- Marmora, a Latin word for marble
- USS Marmora, the name of more than one United States Navy ship

== See also ==
- Marmara (disambiguation)
