= Marmorie =

Fictional warhorse

Marmorie, or Marmor, ("dapple") is the warhorse ridden by Grandoyne son of Capuel the king of Cappadocia, one of the Saracens in the French epic, The Song of Roland. Marmorie is mentioned in laisse 120 of the poem and is said to be exceptionally fast. Grandoyne is riding Marmorie when he kills Gerin in the battle of Roncevaux.
