= Malta national beach soccer team =

Beach football national team

Malta
- Nickname(s): Knights of Malta, Ħomor (Reds), Falcons
- Association: Malta Football Association
- Confederation: UEFA (Europe)
- Captain: Julian Briffa
- FIFA code: MLT
- BSWW ranking: 61 ▼2 (2 June 2025)
First colours
Second colours

First international
- Malta 2–7 Morocco (Pescara, Italy; 2 September 2015)

Biggest win
- Malta 7–6 Algeria (Pescara, Italy; 5 September 2015)

Biggest defeat
- Turkey 14–0 Malta (Pescara, Italy; 4 September 2015)

The Maltese national beach soccer team is the representative team for Malta in international beach soccer competitions. It is coordinated and regulated by the Malta Football Association, the governing body for football in Malta.

Malta made their international competitive debut at the 2015 Mediterranean Beach Games. The former coach of Hungary, Massimiliano De Celis, was the manager during the 2015 tournament, but left the post after the end of the competition.

== Current squad ==
As of September 2015

Note: Flags indicate national team as defined under FIFA eligibility rules; some limited exceptions apply. Players may hold more than one non-FIFA nationality.

No.	Pos.	Nation	Player
1	GK	MLT	Ivan Cassar
2	DF	MLT	Ronald Spina
4	MF	MLT	Julian Briffa (captain)
5	DF	MLT	Justin Camilleri
6	FW	MLT	Mark Camilleri

No.	Pos.	Nation	Player
7	FW	MLT	Ronnie Celeste
8	DF	MLT	George Frendo
9	MF	MLT	Gilbert Martin
10	DF	MLT	Diego Armando Cucciardi
12	GK	MLT	Roderick Camilleri

== Achievements ==
- Mediterranean Beach Games Best: 11th place
  - 2015

== Competitive record ==
=== Mediterranean Beach Games ===
Year	Result	Pld	W	W+	L	GF	GA	GD
Italy 2015	11th place	5	1	0	4	13	43	–30
Total	1/1	5	1	0	4	13	43	–30

== Sources ==
- Squad
- Results
