= Slovakia national beach soccer team =

National sports team

Slovakia
- Association: Slovak Football Association
- Confederation: UEFA (Europe)
- Head coach: Marek Kostoláni; Michal Kanyai
- Captain: Marián Drahoš
- FIFA code: SVK
- BSWW ranking: 74 (1 June 2026)
First colours
Second colours

First international
- Slovakia 1-4 Poland (Benidorm, Spain; 11 May 2008)

Biggest win
- Slovakia 8-4 Norway (Linz, Austria; 19 July 2015)

Biggest defeat
- Slovakia 0-14 Switzerland (Jesolo, Italy; 5 August 2014)

The Slovakia national beach soccer team represents Slovakia in international beach soccer competitions and is controlled by the SFZ, the governing body for football in Slovakia.

== Achievements ==
- FIFA Beach Soccer World Cup qualification (UEFA) Best: Group stage
  - 2008, 2011, 2015
