= Ragnar Rump =

Estonian football, beach soccer and futsal player

Personal information
- Full name: Ragnar Rump
- Date of birth: 12 September 1991 (age 35)
- Place of birth: Aruküla, Estonia
- Position: Defender

Youth career
- Real SC

Senior career*
Years	Team	Apps	(Gls)
2010–2012	Puuma Tallinn		
2014	Tallinna Kalev	8	(0)

International career
2008	Estonia (U18)	3	(0)
2009	Estonia (U19)	10	(0)
2010–2013	Estonia (futsal)	10	(1)
2013–	Estonia (beach soccer)		
- * Club domestic league appearances and goals

Ragnar Rump (born 12 September 1991) is an Estonian football and futsal and beach soccer player. He plays the position of defender.

== International career ==
Rump was a member of Estonia national futsal team.

In 2013 he debuted in Estonia national beach soccer team.
