= Estonia national beach soccer team =

National team

Estonia
- Nickname: Sinisärgid (Blueshirts)
- Association: Estonian Football Association
- Confederation: UEFA (Europe)
- Head coach: Aleksei Galkin
- Captain: Kristian Marmor
- Most caps: Priit Mäerog (46)
- Top scorer: Marko Truusalu (28)
- FIFA code: EST
- BSWW ranking: 39 ▲2 (19 January 2026)
First colours
Second colours

First international
- Ukraine 3–1 Estonia (24 August 2007)

Biggest win
- Estonia 14–3 Bulgaria (Castellón, Spain; 9 June 2009)

Biggest defeat
- Portugal 9–0 Estonia (Castellón, Spain; 11 June 2009)

The Estonia national beach soccer team represents Estonia in international beach soccer competitions and is controlled by the Estonian FA, the governing body for football in Estonia. The Estonia national football team played their first FIFA Beach Soccer World Cup qualifier in August 2007, losing 1–3 to Ukraine.

== Current squad ==
As of 28 August 2016

Note: Flags indicate national team as defined under FIFA eligibility rules; some limited exceptions apply. Players may hold more than one non-FIFA nationality.

No.	Pos.	Nation	Player
1	GK		Taavi Tamm
2	FW		Ervin Stüf
3	DF		Roman Minlibajev
5	DF		Priit Mäeorg
6	FW		Kristian Marmor (captain)

No.	Pos.	Nation	Player
9	FW		Rasmus Munskind
10	DF		Marko Truusalu
11	DF		Sten Teino
12	FW		Ragnar Rump
21	GK		Marten Rimmel

== Managers ==
Manager	Years
(Brazil) (Finland) Fredo Getulio	2007–2008
(Estonia) Kert Haavistu	2009–2013
(Estonia) Reigo Tõnsberg	2014
(Estonia) Rando Rand	2015–2017
(Estonia) Kristian Marmor	2018–2019
(Estonia) Aleksei Galkin	2020–

== Euro Beach Soccer League record ==
- 1998–2007 – Did not participate
- 2008 – 7th in Stage 2
- 2009–2011 – Did not participate
- 2012 – 5th in Division B
- 2013 – 7th in Division B (Promotional Final)
- 2014 – 8th in Division B (Promotional Final)
- 2015 – 2nd in Division B (Promotional Final)
- 2016 – 4th in Division B (Promotional Final)
- 2017 – 2nd in Division B (Promotional Final)
- 2018 – 9th in Division B
- 2019 – 7th in Division B (Promotional final)
- 2020 – Did not participate due to COVID-19 pandemic
- 2021 – 1st in Division B (Promotional Final)
- 2022 – 9th in Division A
- 2023 – 10th in Division A
- 2024 – 8th in Division A

== FIFA Beach Soccer World Cup record ==
- 1995–2006 – Did not participate
- 2007–2023 – Did not qualify
- 2025 – To be determined
