= Kristian Marmor =

Estonian footballer

Personal information
- Full name: Kristian Marmor
- Date of birth: 27 February 1987 (age 39)
- Place of birth: Türi, Estonia
- Height: 1.84 m (6 ft 0 in)
- Position: Right back

Youth career
- FC Flora Kehtna

Senior career*
Years	Team	Apps	(Gls)
2003	SK Lelle	14	(4)
2004	FC Flora Tallinn	1	(0)
2004	JK Tervis Pärnu	18	(4)
2004	Lelle SK	2	(1)
2005	FC Valga	30	(5)
2006–2008	FC Levadia II Tallinn	35	(14)
2006–2009	FC Levadia Tallinn	68	(9)

International career
	Estonia U17	8	(0)
	Estonia U19	10	(1)
	Estonia U20	2	(0)
	Estonia U21	11	(0)
2009	Estonia	1	(0)
2011–	Estonia (beach soccer)	57	
- * Club domestic league appearances and goals

Kristian Marmor (born 27 February 1987 in Türi) is a retired Estonian professional footballer and current beach soccer player.

== Club career ==
=== Levadia ===
Marmor joined Levadia in 2006, having previously played for FC Valga of the Meistriliiga. He is a first-team regular at the club, featuring on an increasingly regular basis.

He retired after the 2008/09 season.

== International career ==
He has represented his home-country in youth teams throughout the years. Marmor made his international debut on 29 May 2009 in a friendly match against Wales.

== Personal ==
He is 1.84 m tall and weighs 80 kg.
