= Lithuania national beach soccer team =

National sports team

Lithuania
- Association: Lietuvos futbolo federacija (LFF)
- Confederation: UEFA (Europe)
- Head coach: (Azerbaijan) Sakhib Mammadov
- FIFA code: LTU
- BSWW ranking: 45 ▲6 (2 June 2025)
First colours	Second colours

First international
- Switzerland 14–3 Lithuania (Benidorm, Spain; 11 May 2008)

Biggest win
- Moldova 0–6 Lithuania (Catania, Italy; 17 August 2019)

Biggest defeat
- Switzerland 16–1 Lithuania (Jesolo, Italy; 3 September 2016)

World Cup
- Appearances: 0
- Best result: None

Euro Beach Soccer League
- Appearances: 0
- Best result: None

Euro Beach Soccer Cup
- Appearances: 0
- Best result: None

Lithuania national beach soccer team represents Lithuania in international beach soccer competitions and is controlled by the Lithuanian Football Federation (LFF), the governing body for football in Lithuania.

== Squad ==
Updated: March 2024
Note: Flags indicate national team as defined under FIFA eligibility rules; some limited exceptions apply. Players may hold more than one non-FIFA nationality.

No.	Pos.	Nation	Player
17	FW	LTU	Viktor Bartosevič
16	GK	LTU	Lukas Drąsutis
7	FW	LTU	Paulius Giedraitis
2	FW	LTU	Redas Graičiūnas
19	DF	LTU	Jonas Lebedevas
9	FW	LTU	Mantas Makutunovičius
8	FW	LTU	Elvinas Navickas

No.	Pos.	Nation	Player
11	FW	LTU	Vasilij Novičkov
1	GK	LTU	Modestas Petrauskas
4	DF	LTU	Audrius Plytnikas
—	GK	LTU	Modestas Kulikauskas
—		LTU	Marius Činikas
—		LTU	Elvinas Ališauskas

Head Coaches:

- (Azerbaijan) Sahib Mammadov (2019 -)
- (Lithuania) Nerijus Budraitis (2017 - 2019)
- (Lithuania) Bronislavas Mickevičius (2014-2016)

== Achievements ==
- FIFA Beach Soccer World Cup qualification (UEFA) best: Group Stage
  - 2008, 2017

== Results ==
=== All Time Record ===
as of July 2014

Tournament	Pld	W	W+	L	GF	GA	Dif	Pts
FIFA Beach Soccer World Cup qualification (UEFA)	6	1	0	5	13	45	–32	3
Other tournaments	19	2	1	16	61	119	–58	8
Total	25	3	1	21	74	164	–90	11

=== World Cup qualifier ===
3 September 2016 2017 FIFA BS World Cup qualifiers	Lithuania	1–16	Switzerland	Jesolo, Italy
9:00	Rebzdis 9'	Report(ru)	Stankovic 1', 10', 16', 17', 34'; Hodel 5', 11', 12', 18'; Spaccarotella 9', 21', 35'; Ott 22', 27', 30'; Wittlin 24'	Referee: Manolo Picchio (Italy)

5 September 2016 2017 FIFA BS World Cup qualifiers	Greece	4–1	Lithuania	Jesolo, Italy
10:15	Kafantaris 8'; Aristeidis 13'; Lignos 19'; Komiotis 28'	Report(ru)	4' Pelakauskas	Referee: Jude Amin Utulu (Malta)

6 September 2016 2017 FIFA BS World Cup qualifiers	Netherlands	3–2	Lithuania	Jesolo, Italy
11:30	Kampman 17'; Steenks 18'; Donker 32'	Report(ru)	7' Smolkovas; 34' Bartoshevich	Referee: Sofien Benchabane (France)

=== 2023 ===
28 January 2023 Friendly	Lithuania	5–1	Norway	Klaipėda, Lithuania
17:00 UTC+2	Skurdelis; Bartosevič; Lebedevas	Report

29 January 2023 Friendly	Lithuania	5–1	Norway	Klaipėda, Lithuania
13:00 UTC+2	Giedraitis; Novičkov; Navickas; Bartosevič	Report
