= 2017 Euro Beach Soccer League =

- Logo the Superfinal of the 2017 EBSL

Tournament details
- Host countries: Serbia; Portugal; Russia; Hungary; Germany; Italy
- Dates: 23 June – 17 September
- Teams: 27 (from 1 confederation)
- Venues: 6 (in 6 host cities)

Final positions
- Champions: Russia (5th title)
- Runners-up: Portugal
- Third place: Italy
- Fourth place: Spain

Tournament statistics
- Matches played: 89
- Goals scored: 727 (8.17 per match)

Locations of the five stages and the Superfinal of the 2017 Euro Beach Soccer League

The 2017 Euro Beach Soccer League (EBSL) was the 20th edition of the annual, premier European competition in beach soccer contested between men's national teams, in a league and play-off format.

This season teams continued to take part in two divisions, the top tier (Division A) and the bottom tier (Division B). Twelve teams continued to contest Division A as in recent seasons, consisting of the top eleven finishers from last year plus Azerbaijan who were promoted to the top tier. Division B was expanded to accommodate fifteen nations; the thirteen nations which did not gain promotion from last season, Lithuania who made their debut, plus Romania who were relegated from the top tier. No nations returned to the tournament after an absence from competing in recent years.

This season, in recognition of the 20th anniversary of the competition, additional matches were scheduled for a total of five stages of fixtures during the regular season. Each team from Division A played in two stages whilst each team from Division B played in one stage. During each stage the participating nations earned points for the overall league tables.

At the end of the regular season stages, according to the league tables, the eight best teams in Division A advanced to the post-season Superfinal to compete directly to become the winners of this year's EBSL. Meanwhile, the top seven teams in Division B (the stage winners and best runners-up) and the team ranked bottom of Division A played in the Promotion Final to try to earn a spot in Division A next year.

Turkey were promoted to Division A after beating Estonia to claim the Promotion Final title. This sees Turkey return to the top flight for the first time since they were relegated from Division A in 2011. Greece finished last in Division A and failed to defend their place in the Promotion Final and were therefore subsequently relegated to Division B, ending their four-year run in the top tier.

Russia won the league after a strong performance in the Superfinal, claiming their fifth EBSL crown to tie for first with Spain and Portugal with the most titles in EBSL history. Defending champions Ukraine were knocked out of title-winning contention in the group stage of the Superfinal, ultimately finishing seventh in the post-season event.

== Calendar and locations ==
Dates	Country	City	Stage
23–25 June	Serbia	Belgrade	Stage 1
7–9 July	Portugal	Nazaré	Stage 2
28–30 July	Russia	Moscow	Stage 3
11–13 August	Hungary	Siófok	Stage 4
25–27 August	Germany	Warnemünde	Stage 5
14–17 September	Italy	Terracina	Superfinal and Promotion Final

== Teams ==
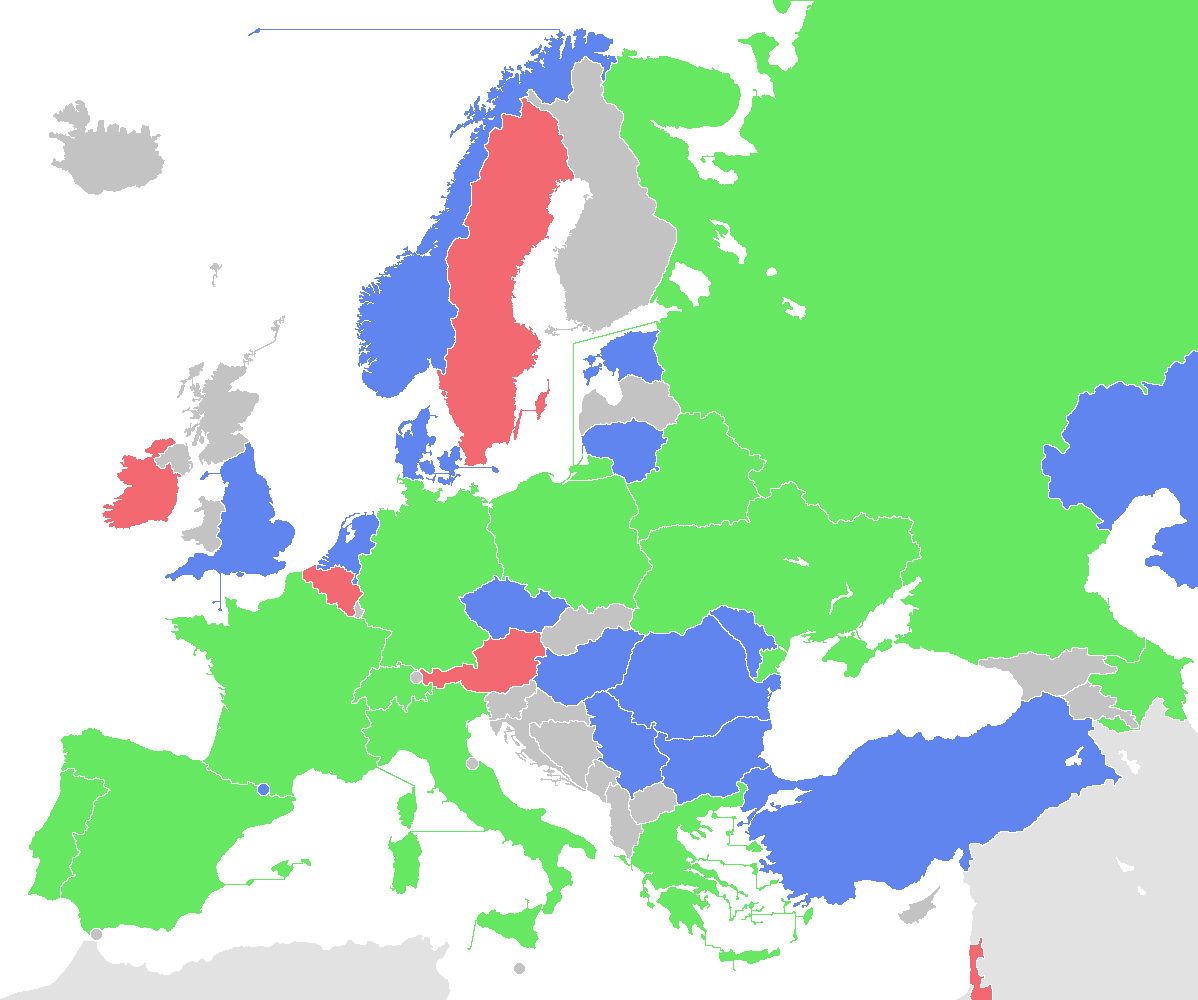
Competing in Division A Competing in Division B Competed in previous editions but not this year Never competed in the EBSL

The following teams have entered this season, in the following divisions (12 in Division A, 15 in Division B).

The numbers in brackets show the European ranking of each team prior to the start of the season, out of 36 nations.

=== Division A ===
- Portugal (1st)
- Russia (2nd)
- Italy (3rd)
- Switzerland (4th)
- Poland (5th)
- Spain (6th)
- Ukraine (7th)
- Belarus (9th)
- France (11th)
- Germany (12th)
- Azerbaijan^{1} (14th)
- Greece (15th)

=== Division B ===
- Hungary (8th)
- England (10th)
- Czech Republic (13th)
- Turkey (16th)
- Romania^{2} (17th)
- Estonia (18th)
- Moldova (19th)
- Netherlands (20th)
- Norway (21st)
- Serbia (22nd)
- Bulgaria (24th)
- Kazakhstan (25th)
- Denmark (26th)
- Andorra (27th)
- Lithuania^{3} (28th)

Notes:

1. Promoted from Division B at the end of the 2016 season
2. Relegated from Division A at the end of the 2016 season
3. Teams making their debut

== Stage 1 (Belgrade, 23–25 June) ==
Matches are listed as local time in Belgrade, CEST (UTC+2)

All matches took place at the National Beach Soccer Stadium at Ada Ciganlija, with a capacity of 2,500.

=== Division A ===
Pos	Team	Pld	W	W+	WP	L	GF	GA	GD	Pts	Notes
1	Spain	3	2	0	0	1	10	9	+1	6	Group Winners
2	France	3	1	1	0	1	13	11	+2	5	
3	Russia	3	1	0	0	2	6	9	–3	3	
4	Germany	3	1	0	0	2	10	10	0	3	

23 June 2017	Spain	2–4	Germany
15:30	Cintas 23'; Llorenç 25'	Report(ru)	9' Biermann; 15' Weirauch; 17' Thürk; 30' (o.g.) Pajón	Referee: Vladimir Tashkov (Bulgaria)

23 June 2017	France	4–2	Russia
16:45	Basquaise 5', 22'; Barbotti 20' (pen.), 36'	Report(ru)	8', 12' Nikonorov	Referee: Gionni Matticoli (Italy)

24 June 2017	Spain	5–4	France
15:30	Antonio 14'; Chiky 20'; Llorenç 21', 26'; Eduard 21'	Report(ru)	1', 36' Belhomme; 13' Soares; 21' Darracq	Attendance: Giuseppe Sicurella (Italy)

24 June 2017	Russia	3–2	Germany
16:45	Makarov 17'; Nikonorov 19'; Krasheninnikov 25'	Report(ru)	28' (pen.) Göttlich; 33' Beqiri	Referee: Oleg Cebotari (Moldova)

25 June 2017	Germany	4–5 (a.e.t.)	France
15:30	Weirauch 16'; Thürk 17'; Petry 23'; Biermann 34'	Report(ru)	11' Belhomme; 18' François; 30', 35' (pen.) Barbotti; 38' Fischer	Referee: Vladimir Tashkov (Bulgaria)

25 June 2017	Russia	1–3	Spain
16:45	Krasheninnikov 32'	Report(ru)	1' Llorenç; 13' Antonio; 27' Chiky	Referee: Gionni Matticoli (Italy)

=== Division B ===
Pos	Team	Pld	W	W+	WP	L	GF	GA	GD	Pts	Notes
1	Estonia	3	2	0	0	1	14	12	+2	6	Group Winners
2	Norway	3	0	1	1	1	15	17	–2	3	
3	Serbia	3	1	0	0	2	13	12	+1	3	
4	Czech Rep.	3	1	0	0	2	11	12	–1	3	

23 June 2017	Estonia	3–5	Czech Rep.
14:15	Stüf 1', 1'; Palm 3'	Report(ru)	9' Boček; 12' Černý; 16' Radosta; 20' Baran; 36' Mižár	Referee: Antonio Pereira Almeida (Portugal)

23 June 2017	Norway	6–6 (a.e.t.) (3–2 p)	Serbia
18:00	Jacobsen 12', 27', 35', 39'; Salveson 20'; Sandsor 31'	Report(ru)	13', 30' Vučićević; 17' Trajković; 32', 39' Čubrilović; 34' Jovančić	Referee: Mikhail Prokharav (Belarus)
	Penalties
	Jacobsen (penalty scored); Salveson (penalty scored); Jalland (penalty scored)		(penalty scored) Jovančić; (penalty scored) Čubrilović; (penalty missed) Vučićević

24 June 2017	Estonia	7–4	Norway
14:15	Rump 13', 19' (pen.); Mäeorg 18'; Kigaste 20'; Stüf 30', 36'; Sooaluste 31'	Report(ru)	2' Sørensen; 13' Jacobsen; 25' Jalland; 35' Salveson	Referee: Tomasz Winiarczyk (Poland)

24 June 2017	Czech Rep.	2–4	Serbia
18:00	Radosta 21'; Vyhnal 24'	Report(ru)	6', 16' Vučićević; 23' Jovančić; 32' Grujić	Referee: Christian Zimmermann (Switzerland)

25 June 2017	Czech Rep.	4–5 (a.e.t.)	Norway
14:15	Boček 10'; Folejtar 16'; Mižár 21'; Holy 34'	Report(ru)	1' Jacobsen; 10' (o.g.) Baran; 11' (pen.) Moen Hansen; 27' Jalland; 37' Li	Referee: Mikhail Prokharav (Belarus)

25 June 2017	Serbia	3–4	Estonia
18:00	Valentić 17'; Čubrilović 23'; Jovančić 36'	Report(ru)	9' Stüf; 24', 29' Palm; 34' Rump	Referee: Antonio Pereira Almeida (Portugal)

Serbia, Norway and Czech Republic are ranked accordingly based on their three-way head-to-head results

=== Awards ===
The following were presented after the conclusion of final day's matches. Individual awards apply to Division A only.

Stage Winners trophy		Top scorer(s)		Best player	Best goalkeeper
Spain (Division A)	Estonia (Division B)	(Spain) Llorenc Gomez (France) Anthony Barbotti	4 goals	(Spain) Llorenc Gomez	(France) Lorenzo Dupin

== Stage 2 (Nazaré, 7–9 July) ==
Stage 2 was originally scheduled to take place in Sanxenxo, Spain but on 1 June, BSWW announced the stage was to be moved due to administrative issues, with Nazaré becoming the new host city due to having successfully hosted the 2017 Euro Winners Cup events, as well as being in close geographical proximity to the original hosts, Sanxenxo.

There were no Division B fixtures during this stage.

=== Division A ===
Matches are listed as local time in Nazaré, WEST (UTC+1)

All matches took place at the Estádio do Viveiro at the Praia de Nazaré, in tandem with the hosting of the 2017 Women's Euro Beach Soccer Cup. The arena has a capacity of 1,600.

==== Group 1 ====
Pos	Team	Pld	W	W+	WP	L	GF	GA	GD	Pts	Notes
1	Spain	3	2	0	0	1	16	7	+9	6	Group Winners
2	Ukraine	3	2	0	0	1	13	12	+1	6	
3	Poland	3	1	0	1	1	9	8	+1	4	
4	Greece	3	0	0	0	3	7	18	–11	0	

7 July 2017	Greece	5–6	Ukraine
14:15	Triantafyllidis 3'; Biris 4'; Tsitaris 15', 20'; Karakasis 36'	Report(ru)	3' Zavorotnyi; 12', 24', 32' Glutskyi; 12', 34' Yevdokymov	Referee: Giuseppe Sicurella (Italy)

7 July 2017	Spain	3–3 (a.e.t.) (6–7 p)	Poland
16:45	Llorenç 11', 15'; Pajón 31'	Report(ru)	2', 6' Jesionowski; 17' Gac	Referee: Sergio Filipe Gomes Soares (Portugal)
	Penalties
	Llorenç (penalty scored); Cintas (penalty missed); Antonio (penalty scored); Chiky (penalty scored); Dris (penalty scored); Pajón (penalty scored); Eduard (penalty scored); Dona (penalty missed)		(penalty scored) Gac; (penalty missed) Madani; (penalty scored) Jesionowski; (penalty scored) Ziober; (penalty scored) Klepczarek; (penalty scored) Depta; (penalty scored) Gasinski; (penalty scored) Friszkemut

8 July 2017	Ukraine	4–3	Poland
14:15	Voitenko 3'; Nazarenko 11'; Glutskyi 29', 30'	Report(ru)	19', 29' Ziober; 25' Kubiak	Referee: Jude Amin Utulu (Malta)

8 July 2017	Spain	9–1	Greece
16:45	Suárez 1' (pen.), 27'; Llorenç 12'; Cristian 16'; Pajón 19'; Dris 21'; Torres 24'; Navarro 24', 24'	Report(ru)	36' (pen.) Triantafyllidis	Referee: Antonio Pereira Almeida (Portugal)

9 July 2017	Poland	3–1	Greece
14:15	Friszkemut 7'; Jesionowski 9'; Gac 29'	Report(ru)	6' Papanastasiou	Referee: Giuseppe Sicurella (Italy)

9 July 2017	Ukraine	3–4	Spain
16:45	Pashko 10', 31'; Glutskyi 12'	Report(ru)	3' Torres; 5', 36' Suárez; 35' Llorenç	Referee: Gionni Matticoli (Italy)

==== Group 2 ====
Pos	Team	Pld	W	W+	WP	L	GF	GA	GD	Pts	Notes
1	Portugal	3	2	1	0	0	25	16	+9	8	Group Winners
2	Switzerland	3	2	0	0	1	15	10	+5	6	
3	Italy	3	1	0	0	2	6	12	–6	3	
4	France	3	0	0	0	3	8	16	–8	0	

7 July 2017	Italy	0–4	Switzerland
15:30		Report(ru)	4' Stanković; 6' Ott; 27' (pen.) Mo; 33' Spaccarotella	Referee: Daniel Querol (Spain)

7 July 2017	France	5–10	Portugal
18:15	Basquaise 3', 14', 22', 22'; Darracq 24'	Report(ru)	1' Madjer; 4' (o.g.) Maison; 13' Torres; 17', 29' Gonçalves; 19', 28' Léo Martins; 27' Andrade; 27' (pen.), 35' Ricardinho	Referee: Eduards Borisevičs (Latvia)

8 July 2017	Italy	1–0	France
15:30	Gori 10'	Report(ru)		Referee: Torsten Guenther (Germany)

8 July 2017	Portugal	7–6 (a.e.t.)	Switzerland
18:15	Torres 19'; Madjer 26', 31', 39'; Léo Martins 35', 36'; Gonçalves 39'	Report(ru)	2', 16' (pen.) Steinemann; 23' V. Jaeggy; 25', 32', 37' Stanković	Referee: Vitalij Gomolko (Lithuania)

9 July 2017	Switzerland	5–3	France
15:30	Stanković 7', 22', 26'; Steinemann 17', 26'	Report(ru)	1' Bizot; 5' Barbotti; 8' Darracq	Referee: Jorge Moya (Spain)

9 July 2017	Portugal	8–5	Italy
18:15	Coimbra 3', 17'; Madjer 10'; Alan 12'; José Maria 14', 25'; Ricardinho 15'; Léo Martins 28'	Report(ru)	8' (pen.) Gori; 13', 19' Ramacciotti; 16' Zurlo; 34' (pen.) Marinai	Referee: Eduards Borisevičs (Latvia)

=== Awards ===
The following were presented after the conclusion of the final day's matches.

Stage Winners trophy	Top scorer(s)		Best player	Best goalkeeper
Portugal	(Switzerland) Dejan Stanković	7 goals	(Portugal) Madjer	(Portugal) Elinton Andrade

== Stage 3 (Moscow, 28–30 July) ==
Matches are listed as local time in Moscow, MSK (UTC+3)

All matches took place at Yantar Beach Soccer Stadium in the district of Strogino, with a capacity of 2,500 seats.

=== Division A ===
Pos	Team	Pld	W	W+	WP	L	GF	GA	GD	Pts	Notes
1	Russia	3	3	0	0	0	19	6	+13	9	Group Winners
2	Belarus	3	2	0	0	1	13	9	+4	6	
3	Switzerland	3	1	0	0	2	16	16	0	3	
4	Greece	3	0	0	0	3	3	20	–17	0	

28 July 2017	Belarus	8–4	Switzerland
17:15	Werder 6' (o.g.); Savich 9'; Bryshtel 25', 29', 34'; Bokach 27'; Samsonov 28'; Kanstantsinau 31'	Report(ru)	17' Werder; 20' Ott; 21', 29' Spaccarotella	Referee: Ingilab Mammadov (Azerbaijan)

28 July 2017	Greece	0–9	Russia
18:30		Report(ru)	3', 9' Nikonorov; 12', 17' Makarov; 14' Shkarin; 19' Krasheninnikov; 21' Kryshanov; 25', 34' Paporotnyi	Referee: Łukasz Ostrowski (Poland)

29 July 2017	Switzerland	8–1	Greece
17:15	Wüest 5'; Ott 8', 9', 11', 16'; Stanković 14'; Spaccarotella 28'; Allenbach 29'	Report(ru)	19' Kafantaris	Referee: Eduards Borisevičs (Latvia)

29 July 2017	Russia	3–2	Belarus
18:30	Krasheninnikov 9'; Shkarin 12', 32'	Report(ru)	21' Bryshtel; 30' Savich	Referee: Alfredo Pavone (Italy)

30 July 2017	Belarus	3–2	Greece
17:15	Bryshtel 2', 28'; Kanstantsinau 17'	Report(ru)	21' Vidalis; 34' Thomas	Referee: Łukasz Ostrowski (Poland)

30 July 2017	Russia	7–4	Switzerland
18:30	Shkarin 7'; Makarov 10', 11', 24'; Kryshanov 22'; Shishin 35'; Krasheninnikov 35'	Report(ru)	11', 12', 17' Stanković; 24' Mo	Referee: Eduards Borisevičs (Latvia)

=== Division B ===
Pos	Team	Pld	W	W+	WP	L	GF	GA	GD	Pts	Notes
1	Turkey	2	2	0	0	0	8	4	+4	6	Group Winners
2	Moldova	2	1	0	0	1	5	5	0	3	
3	Kazakhstan	2	0	0	0	2	5	9	–4	0	

28 July 2017	Moldova	4–2	Kazakhstan
16:00	Arefiev 4'; Ciopa 8'; Negara 9', 34'	Report(ru)	8' Chornyy; 21' Tyulpa	Referee: Viktor Listratov (Russia)

29 July 2017	Kazakhstan	3–5	Turkey
16:00	Kvyatkovskiy 10'; Demeshko 27'; Perevyortov 34'	Report(ru)	7' Keskin; 10' Terzioğlu; 19', 34' Türkmen; 30' Anzafioglu	Referee: Łukasz Ostrowski (Poland)

30 July 2017	Turkey	3–1	Moldova
16:00	Terzioğlu 8'; Süer 12' (pen.); Keskin 30'	Report(ru)	26' Iordachi	Referee: Vitaliy Levchenko (Russia)

=== Awards ===
The following were presented after the conclusion of final day's matches. Individual awards apply to Division A only.

Stage Winners trophy		Top scorer(s)		Best player	Best goalkeeper
Russia (Division A)	Turkey (Division B)	(Belarus) Ihar Bryshtel	6 goals	(Russia) Aleksey Makarov	(Russia) Maxim Chuzhkov

== Stage 4 (Siófok, 11–13 August) ==
Matches are listed as local time in Siófok, CEST (UTC+2)

All matches took place at the Mlsz Beach Aréna at Nagystrand, with a capacity of 1,500.

=== Division A ===
Pos	Team	Pld	W	W+	WP	L	GF	GA	GD	Pts	Notes
1	Portugal	3	2	0	1	0	15	7	+8	7	Group Winners
2	Belarus	3	2	0	0	1	11	4	+7	6	
3	Poland	3	1	0	0	2	8	13	–5	3	
4	Azerbaijan	3	0	0	0	3	8	18	–10	0	

11 August 2017	Belarus	6–0	Poland
15:45	Bryshtel 12' (pen.), 32', 36' (pen.); Kanstatsinau 15'; Bokach 26'; Samsonov 34'	Report(ru)		Referee: Pablo Brea (Spain)

11 August 2017	Azerbaijan	3–9	Portugal
17:00	Allahguliyev 13', 14'; Mammadov 28'	Report(ru)	12', 24' Bê Martins; 13' Madjer; 14', 26' Ricardinho; 17' Coimbra; 18' Jordan; 28' Gonçalves; 34' Léo Martins	Referee: Laurynas Aržuolaitis (Lithuania)

12 August 2017	Belarus	4–1	Azerbaijan
15:45	Kanstatsinau 5', 29'; Bryshtel 12'; Samsonov 14'	Report(ru)	21' Mammadov	Referee: Csaba Baghy (Hungary)

12 August 2017	Portugal	3–3 (a.e.t.) (3–2 p)	Poland
17:00	Bê Martins 6'; Gonçalves 15'; Madjer 22'	Report(ru)	13', 18' Gac; 34' (pen.) Depta	Referee: Saverio Bottalico (Italy)
	Penalties
	Madjer (penalty scored); Coimbra (penalty scored); Jordan (penalty scored)		(penalty scored) Gac; (penalty scored) Depta; (penalty missed) Ziober

13 August 2017	Poland	5–4	Azerbaijan
14:30	Gasinski 11'; Friszkemut 20', 24', 25', 29'	Report(ru)	10', 35' Allahguliyev; 34' Nazarov; 36' Mammadov	Referee: Csaba Baghy (Hungary)

13 August 2017	Portugal	3–1	Belarus
15:45	Léo Martins 3', 30'; Jordan 35'	Report(ru)	4' Samsonov	Referee: Ago Kärtmann (Estonia)

=== Division B ===
Pos	Team	Pld	W	W+	WP	L	GF	GA	GD	Pts	Notes
1	Hungary	3	3	0	0	0	37	6	+31	9	Group Winners
2	Bulgaria	3	2	0	0	1	21	13	+8	6	
3	Denmark	3	1	0	0	2	20	29	–9	3	
4	Andorra	3	0	0	0	3	5	35	–30	0	

11 August 2017	Denmark	5–10	Bulgaria
14:30	Øster 16'; Storm 20'; Rædkjær 24'; C.D. Jørgensen 24'; C.H. Jørgensen 29'	Report(ru)	1', 2', 4', 18', 27', 29' Filipov; 21' Adamov; 24' Martinov; 26', 32' Lozanov	Referee: Ago Kärtmann (Estonia)

11 August 2017	Hungary	14–1	Andorra
18:15	Szacksó 1', 9', 31'; Túrós 2', 6'; Genczler 10', 20', 28'; Fekete 10'; Szentes-Bíró 15', 25'; Rutai 22'; Patócs 24'; Besenyei 29'	Report(ru)	4' (pen.) Regalo	Referee: Christian Zimmermann (Switzerland)

12 August 2017	Andorra	1–8	Bulgaria
14:30	Regalo 30'	Report(ru)	8' (pen.) Velikov; 9' Tuzakov; 13', 26' Martinov; 14' Djambazov; 23' Lozanov; 34' Filipov; 35' (pen.) Adamov	Referee: Ago Kärtmann (Estonia)

12 August 2017	Hungary	16–2	Denmark
18:15	Besenyei 2', 20'; Túrós 6', 11', 20', 29', 35'; Fekete 9', 32'; Szacksó 10'; Genczler 18'; Szentes-Bíró 19', 22'; Rutai 13', 22', 30'	Report(ru)	19' (o.g.) Fekete; 28' Rædkjær	Referee: Richard de Bruijn (Netherlands)

13 August 2017	Denmark	13–3	Andorra
13:15	Rædkjær 4', 9', 27', 30'; C.D. Jørgensen 17', 21', 23', 27', 29'; Ryding 19' (pen.), 24'; Olsen 34', 36'	Report(ru)	19', 33' Neira; 29' Regalo	Referee: Laszlo Legeza (Hungary)

13 August 2017	Bulgaria	3–7	Hungary
17:00	Filipov 20', 35'; Fekete 33' (o.g.)	Report(ru)	6', 19', 36' Besenyei; 7' Patocs; 9' Rutai; 16' Fekete; 31' Túrós	Referee: Pablo Brea (Spain)

=== Awards ===
The following were presented after the conclusion of final day's matches. Individual awards apply to Division A only.

Stage Winners trophy		Top scorer(s)		Best player	Best goalkeeper
Portugal (Division A)	Hungary (Division B)	(Poland) Pawel Friszkemut (Azerbaijan) Sabir Allahguliyev (Belarus) Ihar Bryshtel	4 goals	(Portugal) Jordan Santos	(Belarus) Valery Makarevich

== Stage 5 (Warnemünde, 25–27 August) ==
Matches are listed as local time in Warnemünde, CEST (UTC+2)

All matches took place at the purpose built DFB Beachsoccer Arena, at the site of the Sport & Beach Arena on Warnemünde Beach, with a capacity of 1,500 seats.

=== Division A ===
Pos	Team	Pld	W	W+	WP	L	GF	GA	GD	Pts	Notes
1	Ukraine	3	2	1	0	0	9	6	+3	8	Group Winners
2	Italy	3	2	0	0	1	10	8	+2	6	
3	Azerbaijan	3	1	0	0	2	8	7	+1	3	
4	Germany	3	0	0	0	3	4	10	–6	0	

25 August 2017	Germany	0–3	Azerbaijan
16:00		Report(ru)	23' Mammadov; 29' Allahguliyev; 31' Nazarov	Referee: Vladimir Tashkov (Bulgaria)

25 August 2017	Ukraine	3–2	Italy
17:15	Shcherytsia 18'; Voitok 27', 35'	Report(ru)	19', 30' (pen.) Zurlo	Referee: Lukasz Ostrowski (Poland)

26 August 2017	Ukraine	2–1 (a.e.t.)	Germany
16:00	Pachev 33'; Glutskyi 37'	Report(ru)	4' Körner	Referee: Oleg Burmistrov (Kazakhstan)

26 August 2017	Italy	3–2	Azerbaijan
17:15	Gori 12'; Di Palma 19', 30'	Report(ru)	8' Nazarov; 27' Sultanov	Referee: Nuno Madeira Baptista (Switzerland)

27 August 2017	Azerbaijan	3–4	Ukraine
13:30	Nazatov 6'; Zeynalov 14'; Mammadov 19'	Report(ru)	13' Voitok; 16' Shcherytsia; 26' Zborovsky; 35' Pachev	Referee: Daniel Yuste Querol (Spain)

27 August 2017	Italy	5–3	Germany
14:45	Marinai 6'; Gori 21'; Frainetti 29'; Di Palma 33'; Palmacci 35'	Report(ru)	10', 26', 35' Weirauch	Referee: Lukasz Ostrowski (Poland)

=== Division B ===
Pos	Team	Pld	W	W+	WP	L	GF	GA	GD	Pts	Notes
1	England	3	3	0	0	0	22	10	+12	9	Group Winners
2	Romania	3	2	0	0	1	13	12	+1	6	
3	Lithuania	3	1	0	0	2	12	15	–3	3	
4	Netherlands	3	0	0	0	3	11	21	–10	0	

25 August 2017	Romania	8–4	Netherlands
14:45	Florea 12', 16', 19', 21'; Ciocanel 15'; Petru 22'; Stan 29'; Emil 34'	Report(ru)	1', 19', 22' Timmer; 10' Harms	Referee: Benoit Wolff (France)

25 August 2017	Lithuania	4–9	England
18:30	Meskinis 4'; Novickov 9'; Bartosevic 24'; Kuzmickas 35'	Report(ru)	4', 14', 15', 23', 34' (pen.) Clarke; 11' Humm; 17', 32' Younie; 35' Maxwell	Referee: Torsten Günther (Germany)

26 August 2017	Romania	3–2	Lithuania
13:30	Petru 31'; Ciocanel 33'; Dobre 34' (pen.)	Report(ru)	2' Bartosevic; 33' Smolkovas	Referee: Daniel Yuste Querol (Spain)

26 August 2017	England	7–4	Netherlands
14:45	Clarke 15' (pen.), 26'; Maxwell 16', 36'; Lawson 30'; Younie 33', 35'	Report(ru)	5', 18' Duijnstee; 28' Been; 29' Harms	Referee: Jurijs Ivunsis (Lithuania)

27 August 2017	Netherlands	3–6	Lithuania
11:00	Timmer 7' (pen.); Verdouw 20'; Donker 23'	Report(ru)	2', 9' Kuzmickas; 7', 9' Radavicius; 11', 31' Smolkovas	Referee: Torsten Günther (Germany)

27 August 2017	England	6–2	Romania
12:15	O'Neill 1'; Lawson 20'; Clarke 21', 25'; Love 30'; Camara 32'	Report(ru)	14' Petru; 25' Ravoiu	Referee: Benoit Wolff (France)

=== Awards ===
The following were presented after the conclusion of final day's matches. Individual awards apply to Division A only.

Stage Winners trophy		Top scorer(s)			Best player	Best goalkeeper
Ukraine (Division A)	England (Division B)	(Italy) Michele Di Palma (Ukraine) Maksym Voitok	(Azerbaijan) Amid Nazarov (Germany) Sascha Weirauch	3 goals	(Ukraine) Roman Pachev	(Germany) Toni Muller

== League tables ==
At stage completion

Ranking & tie-breaking criteria: Division A – 1. Points earned 2. Goal difference 3. Goals scored | Division B – 1. Highest group placement 2. Points earned 3. Goal difference 4. Goals scored 5. Results against 4th place team

=== Division A ===
Pos	Team	Pld	W	W+	WP	L	GF	GA	GD	Pts	Notes
1	Portugal	6	4	1	1	0	40	23	+17	15	Advance to Superfinal
2	Ukraine	6	4	1	0	1	22	18	+4	14	Advance to Superfinal
3	Belarus	6	4	0	0	2	24	13	+11	12	Advance to Superfinal
4	Spain	6	4	0	0	2	26	16	+10	12	Advance to Superfinal
5	Russia	6	4	0	0	2	25	15	+10	12	Advance to Superfinal
6	Switzerland	6	3	0	0	3	31	26	+5	9	Advance to Superfinal
7	Italy	6	3	0	0	3	16	20	–4	9	Advance to Superfinal
8	Poland	6	2	0	1	3	17	21	–4	7	Advance to Superfinal
9	France	6	1	1	0	4	21	27	–6	5	
10	Germany	6	1	0	0	5	14	20	–6	3	
11	Azerbaijan	6	1	0	0	5	16	25	–9	3	
12	Greece	6	0	0	0	6	10	38	–28	0	Promotion Final

=== Division B ===
Pos	Team	Pld	W	W+	WP	L	GF	GA	GD	Pts	Notes
1	Hungary (Q) ●	2	2	0	0	0	23	5	+18	6	Advance to Promotion Final
2	England (Q) ●	2	2	0	0	0	15	6	+9	6	Advance to Promotion Final
3	Estonia (Q) ●	2	2	0	0	0	11	7	+4	6	Advance to Promotion Final
4	Turkey (Q) ●	2	2	0	0	0	8	4	+4	6	Advance to Promotion Final
5	Bulgaria (q) ●	2	1	0	0	1	13	12	+1	3	Advance to Promotion Final
6	Moldova (q) ●	2	1	0	0	1	5	5	0	3	Advance to Promotion Final
7	Romania (q) ●	2	1	0	0	1	5	8	–3	3	Advance to Promotion Final
8	Norway ●	2	0	0	1	1	10	13	–3	1	
9	Serbia ●	2	0	0	0	2	9	10	–1	0	
10	Kazakhstan ●	2	0	0	0	2	5	9	–4	0	
11	Lithuania ●	2	0	0	0	2	6	12	–6	0	
12	Denmark ●	2	0	0	0	2	7	26	–19	0	
13	Czech Rep. ●	3	1	0	0	2	11	12	–1	3	
14	Netherlands ●	3	0	0	0	3	11	21	–10	0	
15	Andorra ●	3	0	0	0	3	5	35	–30	0	

Note: Since one group in Division B consisted of just three teams, for the teams who finished in 1st, 2nd or 3rd in a group of four, their results against the 4th placed team in their groups have been discounted. Team group placement: ● 1st place / ● 2nd place / ● 3rd place / ● 4th place

(Q) – Qualified to Promotion Final as group winner
(q) – Qualified Promotion Final as best group runners-up

== Promotion Final (Terracina, 14–17 September) ==
=== Qualified teams ===
The teams in bold have qualified as group winners. The team in italics will attempt to retain their position in Division A, having finished bottom of the table.

- **Hungary**
- **England**
- **Turkey**
- **Estonia**
- Bulgaria
- Romania
- Moldova
- Greece (Last place, Division A)

=== Group stage ===
Matches are listed as local time in Terracina, CEST (UTC+2)

All matches took place at the Beach Arena "Carlo Guarnieri", at Spiaggia di Levante with a capacity of around 2,500.

==== Group 1 ====
Pos	Team	Pld	W	W+	WP	L	GF	GA	GD	Pts	Notes
1	Estonia	3	3	0	0	0	11	5	+6	**9**	Advance to final
2	Greece	3	2	0	0	1	13	9	+4	**6**	
3	Bulgaria	3	1	0	0	2	8	9	–1	**3**	
4	Romania	3	0	0	0	3	7	16	–9	**0**	

14 September 2017	**Estonia**	**4–2**	**Bulgaria**
09:45	Munskind 1'; Rump 10', 12'; Lukk 27'	Report(ru)	29' Tsvetkov; 32' (o.g.) Romka	Referee: Jude Amin Utulu (Malta)

14 September 2017	**Romania**	**4–8**	**Greece**
12:15	Farcas 14'; Ravoiu 24'; Florea 24'; Pulhac 26'	Report(ru)	8', 20' Flengas; 19' Papaefstratiou; 25', 27', 31' Papastathopoulos; 25' Thomas; 25' Gkritzalis	Referee: Saverio Bottalico (Italy)

15 September 2017	**Estonia**	**5–2**	**Romania**
09:45	Rump 22', 28', 34'; Munskind 33'; Juha 36'	Report(ru)	11' Ciocanel; 35' Farcas	Referee: Łukasz Ostrowski (Poland)

15 September 2017	**Greece**	**4–3**	**Bulgaria**
12:20	Triantafyllidis 1'; Papastathopoulos 26'; Gkritzalis 29'; Kafantaris 35'	Report(ru)	8' Iliev; 15' Tuzakov; 28' Martinov	Referee: Giuseppe Sicurella (Italy)

16 September 2017	**Bulgaria**	**3–1**	**Romania**
09:45	Filipov 22', 32'; Martinov 36'	Report(ru)	36' Ravoiu	Referee: Jude Amin Utulu (Malta)

16 September 2017	**Greece**	**1–2**	**Estonia**
12:20	Gkritzalis 9'	Report(ru)	16' Minlibajev; 32' Rump	Referee: Raúl Martín González Francés (Spain)

==== Group 2 ====
Pos	Team	Pld	W	W+	WP	L	GF	GA	GD	Pts	Notes
1	Turkey	3	2	1	0	0	13	8	+5	**8**	Advance to final
2	Hungary	3	2	0	0	1	18	13	+5	**6**	
3	England	3	1	0	0	2	10	12	–2	**3**	
4	Moldova	3	0	0	0	3	7	15	–8	**0**	

14 September 2017	**England**	**2–4** (a.e.t.)	**Turkey**
08:30	Clarke 24'; O'Rourke 30'	Report(ru)	5', 39' Yasin; 34' Seyit; 39' Terzioglu	Referee: Giuseppe Sicurella (Italy)

14 September 2017	**Moldova**	**3–8**	**Hungary**
11:00	Nicolaiciuc 4' (pen.); Ignat 18'; Iordachi 35'	Report(ru)	9' (pen.), 22', 24', 27' Fekete; 16', 22', 25' Patocs; 33' Rutai	Referee: Łukasz Ostrowski (Poland)

15 September 2017	**England**	**4–2**	**Moldova**
08:30	Younie 12'; Humm 13'; Love 19'; Clarke 35'	Report(ru)	33' Iordachi; 34' Capsamun	Referee: Eduards Borisevičs (Latvia)

15 September 2017	**Hungary**	**4–6**	**Turkey**
11:00	Berkes 9'; Besenyei 11'; Fekete 35'; Szentes-Biro 36'	Report(ru)	1' Semíh; 3' (pen.), 22', 22', 23', 34' Keskin	Referee: Raúl Martín González Francés (Spain)

16 September 2017	**Turkey**	**3–2**	**Moldova**
08:30	Yesilirmak 1', 34'; Akbal 8'	Report(ru)	27' Ignat; 33' Ciubotaru	Referee: Giuseppe Sicurella (Italy)

16 September 2017	**Hungary**	**6–4**	**England**
11:00	Menyhei 6'; Berkes 9'; Besenyei 13', 13'; Balazs 16' (pen.); Turos 31'	Report(ru)	13', 20' (pen.), 27' Clarke; 26' O'Neill	Referee: Saverio Bottalico (Italy)

=== Play-off stage ===
==== Seventh place play-off ====
17 September 2017
08:30

Romania	3–5	Moldova
Petru 18', 32'; Florea 26'	Report(ru)	5', 7', 8' Eremia; 9' Negara; 35' Podlesnov

Referee: Gionni Matticoli (Italy)

==== Fifth place play-off ====
17 September 2017
09:45

Bulgaria	3–5	England
Filipov 18'; Lozanov 18'; Djambazov 24'	Report(ru)	5' Clarke; 9' Love; 17' O'Rourke; 18', 33' Younie

Referee: Raúl Martín González Francés (Spain)

==== Third place play-off ====
17 September 2017
13:45

Greece	1–3	Hungary
Triantafyllidis 11'	Report(ru)	3' Berkes; 11', 18' (pen.) Genczler

Referee: Jude Amin Utulu (Malta)

==== Promotion play-off final ====
17 September 2017
15:00

Estonia	2–4	Turkey
Lepik 27'; Kigaste 33'	Report(ru)	10', 11' Yasin; 15' Anzafioglu; 17' Keskin

Referee: Giuseppe Sicurella (Italy)

=== Final standings ===
Pos	Team	Qualification
**1**	**Turkey**	**Promoted to 2018 EBSL Division A**
2	Estonia	Remain in Division B
3	Hungary	Remain in Division B
4	Greece	Relegated to 2018 EBSL Division B
5	England	Remain in Division B
6	Bulgaria	Remain in Division B
7	Moldova	Remain in Division B
8	Romania	Remain in Division B

Italics: team from Division A

== Superfinal (Terracina, 14–17 September) ==
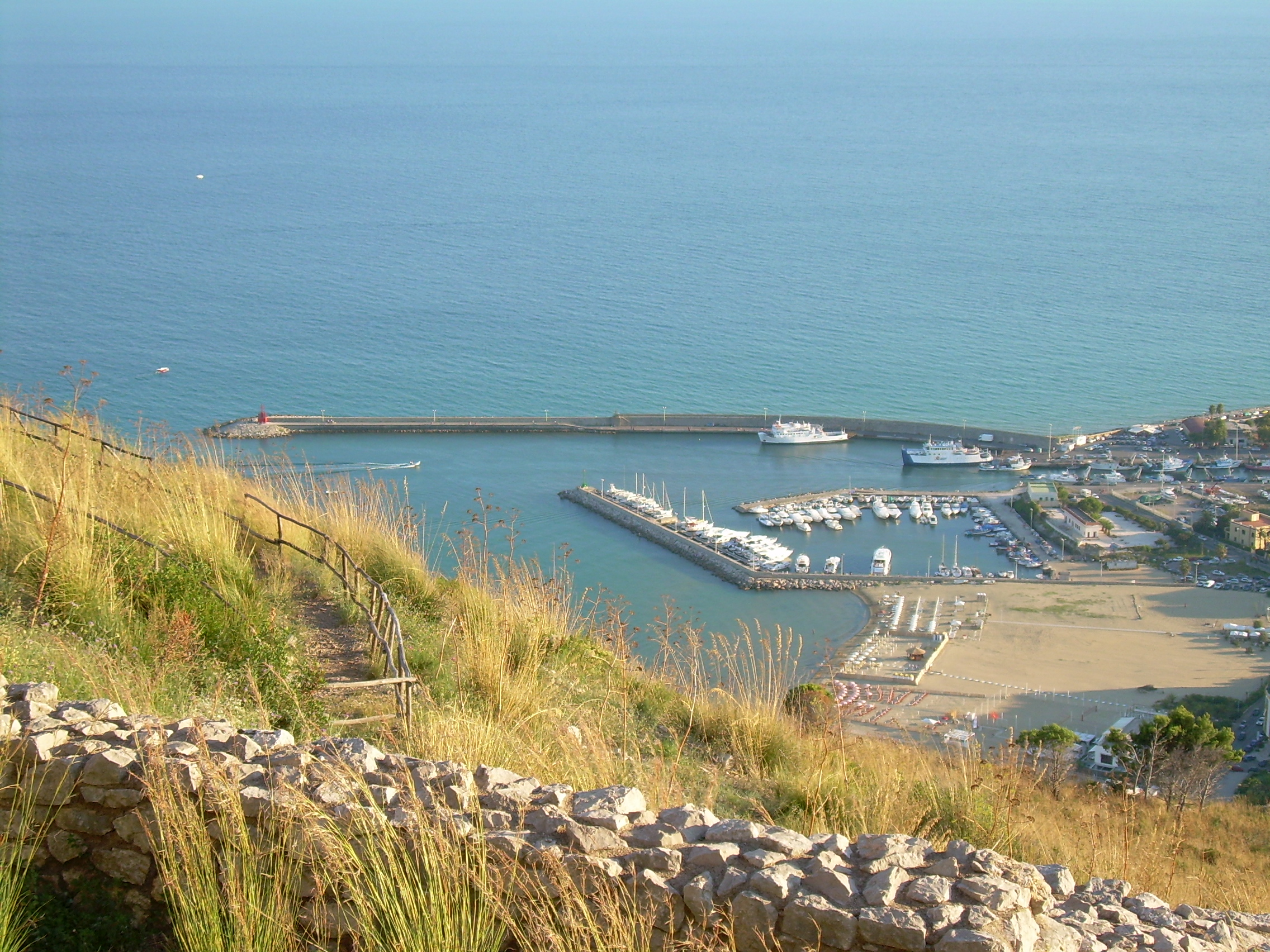
Levante Beach in Terracina (far right), the venue of the Superfinal and Promotion Final

=== Qualified teams ===
The top eight teams from Division A, as per the league table, qualified for the Superfinal.

- Portugal
- Ukraine
- Belarus
- Spain
- Russia
- Switzerland
- Italy
- Poland

=== Group stage ===
Matches are listed as local time in Terracina, CEST (UTC+2)

All matches took place at the Beach Arena "Carlo Guarnieri", at Spiaggia di Levante with a capacity of around 2,500.

==== Group 1 ====
Pos	Team	Pld	W	W+	WP	L	GF	GA	GD	Pts	Notes
1	Portugal	3	3	0	0	0	18	14	+4	9	Advance to final
2	Spain	3	2	0	0	1	18	11	+7	6	
3	Switzerland	3	1	0	0	2	17	21	–4	3	
4	Poland	3	0	0	0	3	15	22	–7	0	

14 September 2017	Spain	7–2	Switzerland
13:30	Suárez 2', 25', 35'; Gomez 9'; Chiky 16'; Mayor 29'; Fernando 34'	Report(ru)	16' Wuest; 25' Ott	Referee: Gionni Matticoli (Italy)

14 September 2017	Poland	4–6	Portugal
16:00	Ziober 5'; Friszkemut 7' (pen.); Gac 27'; Kubiak 32'	Report(ru)	6' Léo Martins; 6' Coimbra; 17', 36' Bê Martins; 21' Torres; 29' Santos	Referee: Torsten Günther (Germany)

15 September 2017	Spain	8–5	Poland
13:30	Mayor 4', 15'; Garcia 16'; Chiky 17', 31' (pen.), 35'; Ziober 21' (o.g.); Gomez 34'	Report(ru)	15', 36' Jesionowski; 16' Friszkemut; 21' Gac; 23' (pen.) Depta	Referee: Alfredo Pavone (Italy)

15 September 2017	Portugal	8–7	Switzerland
16:15	Bê Martins 12', 19'; Madjer 21' (pen.), 35' (pen.); Léo Martins 24', 32', 36'; Santos 28'	Report(ru)	1', 19', 20' Ott; 1', 34', 36' Stankovic; 30' Mo	Referee: Jude Amin Utulu (Malta)

16 September 2017	Switzerland	8–6	Poland
13:30	Spaccarotella 8'; Ott 10', 26', 28'; Hodl 12'; Stankovic 29', 35'; Micev 31'	Report(ru)	8' Madani; 10' Jesionowski; 13' Gac; 15' Kubiak; 22' Pietrzkiewicz; 29' (pen.) Friszkemut	Referee: Torsten Günther (Germany)

16 September 2017	Portugal	4–3	Spain
16:00	Bê Martins 10'; Léo Martins 13', 28'; Santos 20'	Report(ru)	27', 29', 30' Mayor	Referee: Gionni Matticoli (Italy)

==== Group 2 ====
Pos	Team	Pld	W	W+	WP	L	GF	GA	GD	Pts	Notes
1	Russia	3	3	0	0	0	12	6	+6	9	Advance to final
2	Italy	3	2	0	0	1	19	13	+6	6	
3	Belarus	3	1	0	0	2	8	10	–2	3	
4	Ukraine	3	0	0	0	3	7	17	–10	0	

14 September 2017	Belarus	1–4	Russia
14:45	Bryshtel 3'	Report(ru)	4', 12' V. Kryshanov; 20' Nikonorov; 27' Chuzhkov	Referee: Eduards Borisevičs (Latvia)

14 September 2017	Italy	11–4	Ukraine
17:30	Gori 1', 2' (pen.), 21', 25'; Di Palma 4', 14'; Ramacciotti 9'; Palmacci 10'; Zurlo 10', 11'; Marinai 32'	Report(ru)	12' Glutskiy; 22' Pachev; 32' Zborovskyi; 35' Zavorotnyi	Referee: Ago Kärtmann (Estonia)

15 September 2017	Ukraine	3–4	Russia
15:00	Hlandchenko 26'; Pachev 30'; Voitok 34'	Report(ru)	21', 34' Nikonorov; 36', 36' Paporontyi	Referee: Laurynas Aržuolaitis (Lithuania)

15 September 2017	Belarus	5–6	Italy
17:40	Savich 2', 7'; Slavutsin 6'; Miranovich 29'; Kanstantsinau 34'	Report(ru)	3', 21', 25' Gori; 10' Marinai; 17' Zurlo; 29' Palmacci	Referee: Antonio Pereira Almeida (Portugal)

16 September 2017	Ukraine	0–2	Belarus
14:55		Report(ru)	18', 32' Bryshtel	Referee: Ago Kärtmann (Estonia)

16 September 2017	Russia	4–2	Italy
17:15	Kryshanov 8'; Pavlenko 10'; Romanov 21', 36'	Report(ru)	14' Palmacci; 29' Zurlo	Referee: Eduards Borisevičs (Latvia)

=== Play-off stage ===
==== Seventh place play-off ====
17 September 2017
11:00

Poland	4–4 (a.e.t.)	Ukraine
Ziober 1'; Jesionowski 14'; Friszkemut 27'; Kubiak 30'	Report(ru)	6', 8', 11' Zborovsky; 14' Voitok
Penalties
Depta (penalty missed); Gak (penalty scored); Jesionowski (penalty missed)	1–2	(penalty scored) Voitok; (penalty scored) Panteleichuk

Referee: Eduards Borisevičs (Latvia)

==== Fifth place play-off ====
17 September 2017
12:25

Switzerland	6–4	Belarus
Ott 5', 27'; Hodl 9' (pen.); Ostgen 9'; Stankovic 15', 36'	Report(ru)	5' Hapon; 9' Bryshtel; 15' Savich; 32' Chaikouski

Referee: Alfredo Pavone (Italy)

==== Third place play-off ====
17 September 2017
16:10

Spain	2–2 (a.e.t.)	Italy
Gomez 9'; Chiky 23'	Report(ru)	2' Marinai; 6' Palmacci
Penalties
Gomez (penalty missed); Mayor (penalty missed)	0–2	(penalty scored) Marinai; (penalty scored) Corosiniti

Referee: Antonio Pereira Almeida (Portugal)

==== Superfinal match ====
17 September 2017
17:30

Portugal	1–3	Russia
Santos 36'	Report(ru)	9' Krasheninnikov; 12', 22' Paporotnyi

Referee: Laurynas Arzuolaitis (Lithuania)

=== Awards ===
==== Winners trophy ====
2017 Euro Beach Soccer League
champions

Russia
Fifth title

==== Individual awards ====
Awarded for feats achieved in the Superfinal only

Top scorer
(Switzerland) Noel Ott
9 goals
Best player
(Russia) Artur Paporotnyi
Best goalkeeper
(Russia) Maxim Chuzhkov

=== Final standings ===
Pos	Team	Notes
1	Russia	Champions
2	Portugal	Runners-up
3	Italy	Third place
4	Spain	
5	Switzerland	
6	Belarus	
7	Ukraine	
8	Poland	

== Season statistics ==
=== Top scorers ===
The following tables list the top 10 scorers in each division including goals scored in both the regular and post season events. Note there is no award presented for these season-encompassing scoring feats, the tables are for statistical purposes only. Scoring awards were bestowed per stage, with the primary award that which was presented in the Superfinal.

==== Division A ====
Rank	Player	Pld	Goals
1	(Switzerland) Dejan Stanković	10	18
2	(Switzerland) Noël Ott	9	15
3	(Portugal) Léo Martins	10	14
3	(Belarus) Ihar Bryshtel	10	14
5	(Italy) Gabriele Gori	9	11
5	(Spain) Llorenç Gómez	10	11
7	(Portugal) Madjer	10	9
7	(Spain) Salvador Ardil "Chiky"	10	9
7	(Poland) Paweł Friszkemut	10	9
10	(Portugal) Bê Martins	7	8
10	(Russia) Boris Nikonorov	8	8
10	(Ukraine) Ivan Glutskyi	10	8
10	(Spain) Antonio Mayor	10	8
10	(Spain) Eduard Suárez	10	8

==== Division B ====
Rank	Player	Pld	Goals
1	(England) Aaron Clarke	7	15
2	(Bulgaria) Filip Filipov	7	12
3	(Hungary) Viktor Túrós	7	9
3	(Hungary) Ferenc Besenyei	7	9
3	(Hungary) Viktor Fekete	7	9
3	(Estonia) Ragnar Rump	7	9
7	(Turkey) Cem Keskin	6	8
8	(England) Jake Younie	7	7
9	(Denmark) Casper Dorph Jørgensen	3	6
9	(Denmark) Henrik Rædkjær	3	6
9	(Norway) Jørn-Andre Lygre Jacobsen	3	6
9	(Hungary) Kornel Genczler	5	6
9	(Romania) Ionut Florea	7	6
9	(Hungary) Balazs Rutai	7	6

=== Assists ===
The following tables list the top five assistants in each division including assists provided in both the regular and post season events.

==== Division A ====
Rank	Player	Pld	Assists
1	(Switzerland) Dejan Stanković	10	7
2	(Spain) Eduard Suárez	10	6
2	(Russia) Maxim Chuzhkov	10	6
4	(Switzerland) Michael Misev	8	5
4	(Russia) Anton Shkarin	9	5
4	(Portugal) Elinton Andrade	10	5
4	(Belarus) Valery Makarevich	10	5
4	(Italy) Dario Ramacciotti	10	5

==== Division B ====
Rank	Player	Pld	Assists
1	(Bulgaria) Ivan Todorov	7	5
2	(Romania) Gabriel Dobre	3	3
2	(Denmark) Klaus Ryding	3	3
2	(Romania) Bogdan Ciocanel	6	3
2	(Hungary) Viktor Fekete	7	3

Note: The source of these assists stats does not explain what system was used to determine the award of an assist. The total no. of assists recorded is 270 but 727 goals were scored. The discrepancy of the source not recording an assist for every goal scored may be due to a system in use such as FIFAs assists system - (regardless of who made the final pass to the scorer, no assist is awarded when the scorer ultimately lays the goal on for him/herself via a dribble, solo run etc, scores after intercepting an opponent's pass etc.). However since the system in use is not explained, note that assists may simply of gone undocumented.

=== Discipline ===
The following table lists the players and teams who received the most penalties for disciplinary infringements in each division in both the regular and post season events.

Category	Div.	Player(s)		#	Team(s)	#
Most yellow cards (yellow card)	A	(Switzerland) Dejan Stanković (Poland) Konrad Kubiak (Italy) Gabriele Gori		4	Switzerland	18
Most yellow cards (yellow card)	B	(Serbia) Nikola Valentić (Serbia) Vojislav Trajkovic (Estonia) Ragnar Rump (Bulgaria) Pavel Adamov (Bulgaria) Martin Velikov (Bulgaria) Stanislav Dzhambazov (Hungary) Richard Patocs	(Bulgaria) Filip Filipov (Romania) Bogdan Ciocanel (Moldova) Victor Iordachi (Turkey) Semíh Türkmen (Romania) Gabriel Dobre (Bulgaria) Kaloyan Tsvetkov (Lithuania) Viktor Bartosevic	2	Bulgaria	13
Second yellow cards (yellow card) (yellow-red card)	A	(Portugal) Bruno Torres (Russia) Anton Shkarin		1	Portugal; Russia	1
Second yellow cards (yellow card) (yellow-red card)	B	(Denmark) Dan Storm		1	Denmark	1
Straight red cards (red card)	A	(Switzerland) Tobias Steinemann		1	Switzerland	1
Straight red cards (red card)	B	(Turkey) Erkan Anzafioglu (Lithuania) Aivaras Meškinis (England) Taylor Humm (Moldova) Leonid Podlesnov		1	Turkey; Lithuania; England; Moldova	1
