= Turkey national beach soccer team =

Turkey
- Nickname(s): Ay Yıldızlılar (The Crescent-Stars)
- Association: Turkish Football Federation
- Confederation: UEFA (Europe)
- Head coach: Emrah Aykurt
- Most caps: Erkan Anzaflıoğlu (57)
- Top scorer: Barış Terzioğlu (48)
- FIFA code: TUR
- BSWW ranking: 48 ▼5 (2 September 2026)
First colours
Second colours

First international
- Turkey 5–6 Germany (Alanya, Turkey; 14 July 2000)

Biggest win
- Turkey 14–0 Malta (Pescara, Italy; 4 September 2015)

Biggest defeat
- Belarus 12–1 Turkey (Batumi, Georgia; 18 July 2025)

The Turkey national beach soccer team represents Turkey in international beach soccer competitions and is controlled by the TFF, the governing body for football in Turkey.

== Results ==
=== 2017 Euro Beach Soccer League ===
29 July 2017 Kazakhstan 3–5 Turkey

30 July 2017 Turkey 3–1 Moldova

14 September 2017 England 2–4 (a.e.t.) Turkey

15 September 2017 Hungary 4–6 Turkey

16 September 2017 Turkey 3–2 Moldova

17 September 2017 Estonia 2–4 Turkey

=== 2018 Euro Beach Soccer League ===
6 July 2018 Turkey 3–5 Portugal

7 July 2018 Spain 4–0 Turkey

8 July 2018 Ukraine 6–4 (a.e.t.) Turkey

3 August 2018 Belarus 9–4 Turkey

4 August 2018 Turkey 0–3 Italy

5 August 2018 Poland 7–9 Turkey

=== 2019 Euro Beach Soccer League ===
5 July 2019 Turkey 2–6 Spain

6 July 2019 Russia 5–2 Turkey

7 July 2019 Azerbaijan 2–6 Turkey

5 September 2019 Turkey 5–9 Portugal

6 September 2019 Italy 7–2 Turkey

7 September 2019 Ukraine 6–6 (a.e.t.) (1–3 p) Turkey

8 September 2019 Belarus 5–4 Turkey

=== 2020 Euro Beach Soccer League ===
Withdraw

=== 2021 Euro Beach Soccer League ===
17 June 2021 Turkey 1–5 Russia

18 June 2021 Spain 5–3 Turkey

19 June 2021 Belarus 8–2 Turkey

9 September 2021 Lithuania 3–0 Turkey

10 September 2021 Turkey 7–5 Greece

11 September 2021 Turkey 9–2 Kazakhstan

12 September 2021 Turkey 3–4 Estonia

=== 2023 Euro Beach Soccer League ===
19 September 2023 Azerbaijan 5–5 (a.e.t.) (3–1 p) Turkey

20 September 2023 Switzerland 4–7 Turkey

21 September 2023 Turkey 3–4 Romania

22 September 2023 Turkey 1–2 Poland

24 September 2023 Turkey 5–6 Estonia

== Tournament Records ==
=== Beach Soccer World Championships ===
Beach Soccer World Championships
Year	Round	Pld	W	WE	WP	L	GS	GA	Dif	Pts
(Brazil) 1995	Did not enter	-	-	-	-	-	-	-	-	-
(Brazil) 1996	Did not enter	-	-	-	-	-	-	-	-	-
(Brazil) 1997	Did not enter	-	-	-	-	-	-	-	-	-
(Brazil) 1998	Did not enter	-	-	-	-	-	-	-	-	
(Brazil) 1999	Did not enter	-	-	-	-	-	-	-	-	-
(Brazil) 2000	Did not enter	-	-	-	-	-	-	-	-	-
(Brazil) 2001	10th Place	2	0	0	0	2	1	5	-4	0
(Brazil) 2002	Did not enter	-	-	-	-	-	-	-	-	-
(Brazil) 2003	Did not enter	-	-	-	-	-	-	-	-	-
(Brazil) 2004	Did not enter	-	-	-	-	-	-	-	-	-
Total	1/10	2	0	0	0	2	1	5	-4	0

FIFA Beach Soccer World Cup
Year	Round	Pld	W	WE	WP	L	GS	GA	Dif	Pts
(Brazil) 2005	Did not qualify	-	-	-	-	-	-	-	-	-
(Brazil) 2006	Did not qualify	-	-	-	-	-	-	-	-	-
(Brazil) 2007	Did not qualify	-	-	-	-	-	-	-	-	-
(France) 2008	Did not qualify	-	-	-	-	-	-	-	-	-
(United Arab Emirates) 2009	Did not qualify	-	-	-	-	-	-	-	-	-
(Italy) 2011	Did not qualify	-	-	-	-	-	-	-	-	-
(French Polynesia) 2013	Did not qualify	-	-	-	-	-	-	-	-	-
(Portugal) 2015	Did not qualify	-	-	-	-	-	-	-	-	-
(The Bahamas) 2017	Did not qualify	-	-	-	-	-	-	-	-	-
(Paraguay) 2019	Did not qualify	-	-	-	-	-	-	-	-	-
(Russia) 2021	Did not qualify	-	-	-	-	-	-	-	-	-
(United Arab Emirates) 2023	Did not qualify	-	-	-	-	-	-	-	-	-
(Seychelles) 2025	To be determined	-	-	-	-	-	-	-	-	-
Total	0/13	0	0	0	0	0	0	0	0	0

=== FIFA Beach Soccer World Cup Qualification (UEFA) ===
FIFA Beach Soccer World Cup Qualification Record
Year	Result	Pld	W	WE	WP	L	GS	GA	Dif	Pts
(Spain) 2008	Did not enter	-	-	-	-	-	-	-	-	-
(Spain) 2009	Round of 16	3	1	0	0	2	12	21	-9	3
(Italy) 2011	Round of 16	3	1	0	0	2	9	16	-7	3
(Russia) 2013	Round of 16	4	1	0	0	3	16	20	-4	3
(Italy) 2015	9th Place	7	3	0	0	4	21	25	-2	9
(Italy) 2017	13th Place	8	4	0	0	4	40	34	+6	12
(Russia) 2019	Round of 16	4	0	0	0	4	7	20	–13	0
(Portugal) 2021	Round of 16	4	1	0	0	3	17	18	–14	0
(Azerbaijan) 2023	Ongoing									
Total	8/9	29	10	0	0	19	105	136	-31	30

=== Euro Beach Soccer Cup ===
Euro Beach Soccer Cup Record
Year	Round	Pld	W	WE	WP	L	GS	GA	Dif	Pts
(Italy) 1998	Did not enter	-	-	-	-	-	-	-	-	-
(Spain) 1999	Did not enter	-	-	-	-	-	-	-	-	-
(Spain) 2001	7th Place	3	1	0	0	2	9	13	-4	3
(Spain) 2002	Did not enter	-	-	-	-	-	-	-	-	-
(Belgium) 2003	Did not enter	-	-	-	-	-	-	-	-	-
(Portugal) 2004	Did not enter	-	-	-	-	-	-	-	-	-
(Russia) 2005	Did not enter	-	-	-	-	-	-	-	-	-
(Italy) 2006	Did not enter	-	-	-	-	-	-	-	-	-
(Spain) 2007	Did not enter	-	-	-	-	-	-	-	-	-
(Azerbaijan) 2008	Did not enter	-	-	-	-	-	-	-	-	-
(Italy) 2009	Did not enter	-	-	-	-	-	-	-	-	-
(Italy) 2010	Did not enter	-	-	-	-	-	-	-	-	-
(Russia) 2012	Did not enter	-	-	-	-	-	-	-	-	-
(Azerbaijan) 2014	Did not enter	-	-	-	-	-	-	-	-	-
(Serbia) 2016	Did not enter	-	-	-	-	-	-	-	-	-
Total	1/15	3	1	0	0	2	9	13	-4	3

=== Euro Beach Soccer League ===
- Euro Beach Soccer League

=== Pro Beach Soccer Tour ===
- Pro Beach Soccer Tour

=== Beach Soccer Intercontinental Cup ===
Beach Soccer Intercontinental Cup
Year	Round	Pld	W	WE	WP	L	GS	GA	Dif	Pts
(United Arab Emirates) 2011	Did Not Enter	–	–	–	–	–	–	–	–	–
(United Arab Emirates) 2012	Did Not Enter	–	–	–	–	–	–	–	–	–
(United Arab Emirates) 2013	Did Not Enter	–	–	–	–	–	–	–	–	–
(United Arab Emirates) 2014	Did Not Enter	–	–	–	–	–	–	–	–	–
(United Arab Emirates) 2015	Did Not Enter	–	–	–	–	–	–	–	–	–
(United Arab Emirates) 2016	Did Not Enter	–	–	–	–	–	–	–	–	–
Total	0/6	–	–	–	–	–	–	–	–	–

=== BSWW Mundialito ===
BSWW Mundialito Record
Year	Round	Pld	W	WE	WP	L	GS	GA	Dif	Pts
(Brazil) 1994 to 2016	Did Not Enter	–	–	–	–	–	–	–	–	–
Total	0/20	–	–	–	–	–	–	–	–	–

=== European Games ===
European Games Record
Year	Round	Pld	W	WE	WP	L	GS	GA	Dif	Pts
(Azerbaijan) 2015	Did Not Enter	–	–	–	–	–	–	–	–	–
Total	0/1	–	–	–	–	–	–	–	–	–

=== Mediterranean Beach Games ===
Mediterranean Beach Games
Year	Round	Pld	W	WE	WP	L	GS	GA	Dif	Pts
(Italy) 2015	7th Place	5	2	0	0	3	24	14	+10	6
Total	1/1	5	2	0	0	3	24	14	+10	6

== Current squad ==
As of 26 August 2021

Note: Flags indicate national team as defined under FIFA eligibility rules; some limited exceptions apply. Players may hold more than one non-FIFA nationality.

No.	Pos.	Nation	Player
—	GK	TUR	Mehmet Aşlamacı
—	GK	TUR	İsmail Turhan
—	GK	TUR	Serkan Banazlı
—	DF	TUR	Volkan Yeşilırmak
—	DF	TUR	Yasin Bağcı
—	DF	TUR	Recep Demir
—	DF	TUR	Efe Lorenzo Deniz
—	DF	TUR	Oğuzhan Karaca

No.	Pos.	Nation	Player
—	DF	TUR	Ferhat Gülbağ
—	FW	TUR	Seyit Ahmet Süer
—	FW	TUR	Barış Terzioğlu
—	FW	TUR	Cem Keskin
—	FW	TUR	Ömer Behiç Benlidayı
—	FW	TUR	Enes İşcan
—	FW	TUR	Semih Türkmen
