= Ukraine national beach soccer team =

Ukraine
- Nickname(s): Zhovto-Blakytni (the Yellow-Blues)
- Association: Football Federation of Ukraine
- Confederation: UEFA (Europe)
- Head coach: Serhiy Kucherenko
- Captain: Ihor Borsuk
- FIFA code: UKR
- BSWW ranking: 22 (19 January 2026)
First colours
Second colours

First international
- Brazil 5–2 Ukraine (Figueira da Foz, Portugal; 29 July 2003)

Biggest win
- Ukraine 9–0 Czech Republic (Jesolo, Italy; 6 September 2016)

Biggest defeat
- Brazil 8–1 Ukraine (Portimao, Portugal; 13 August 2005); Ukraine 1–8 Poland (Cádiz, Spain; 7 October 2024)

The Ukraine national beach soccer team represents Ukraine in international beach soccer competitions and is controlled by the FFU, the governing body for football in Ukraine.

== Fixtures and results ==
Legend

Win Draw Lose Fixture

=== 2022 ===
1 October Friendly match	Japan	4–2	Ukraine	Akashi, Japan
14:00 JST (UTC+9)	Moreira 15'; Oba 26'; Akaguma 29'; Yamauchi 32'	Report (JFA)	Levchenko 16'; Voitenko 25'	Stadium: Ōkura Beach Park; Referee: Turki Al-Salehi (Oman)

2 October Friendly match	Japan	v	Ukraine	Akashi, Japan
14:00 JST (UTC+9)		Report (JFA)		Stadium: Ōkura Beach Park

== Current coaching staff ==
- Coach: Mykola Kostenko

== Current squad ==
The following 12 players were called up for two friendly matches against Japan on 1 October and 2 October 2022.

Note: Flags indicate national team as defined under FIFA eligibility rules; some limited exceptions apply. Players may hold more than one non-FIFA nationality.

No.	Pos.	Nation	Player
1	GK		Andrii Nerush
3	FP		Maksym Voitok
4	FP		Tymofii Verbytskyi
5	FP		Yaroslav Zavorotnyi
6	FP		Andrii Borsuk (captain)

No.	Pos.	Nation	Player
10	FP		Dmytro Medvid
11	FP		Oleksandr Korniichuk
12	GK		Taras Kovalenko
15	FP		Dmytro Voitenko
17	FP		Andrii Pashko
19	FP		Ihor Levchenko
21	FP		Oleh Shchytnik

== Competitive record ==
=== FIFA Beach Soccer World Cup Qualification (UEFA) ===
FIFA Beach Soccer World Cup Qualification Record
Year	Round	Pld	W	WE	WP	L	GS	GA	Dif	Pts
(Spain) 2008	—	5	4	0	0	1	26	17	+9	12
(Spain) 2009	—	4	1	0	1	2	18	15	+3	4
(Italy) 2011	—	7	5	0	1	1	37	22	+15	16
(Russia) 2013	—	8	7	0	0	1	33	20	+13	21
(Italy) 2015	—	8	6	0	0	2	41	24	+17	18
(Italy) 2017	—	7	3	0	1	3	33	20	+13	10
(Russia) 2019	Boycotted									
(Portugal) 2021	—	6	4	0	0	2	22	20	+14	12
(Azerbaijan) 2023	—	4	3	1	0	1	16	10	+7	11
Total	8/9	39	26	0	3	10	188	118	+70	81

== Honours ==
- FIFA Beach Soccer World Cup Best: Sixth place
  - 2005
- Euro Beach Soccer League: Winners
  - 2016
- Euro Beach Soccer Cup: Winners
  - 2007
- FIFA Beach Soccer World Cup qualifying tournament: Winners
  - 2011
