= 2011 FIFA Beach Soccer World Cup qualification (UEFA) =

2011 FIFA Beach Soccer World Cup Qualification (UEFA)
Tournament details
- Host country: Italy
- Dates: 11–18 July 2010
- Teams: 27 (from 1 confederation)
- Venue: 1 (in 1 host city)

Final positions
- Champions: Ukraine (1st title)
- Runners-up: Portugal
- Third place: Russia
- Fourth place: Switzerland

Tournament statistics
- Matches played: 55
- Goals scored: 480 (8.73 per match)
- Attendance: 82,000 (1,491 per match)
- Top scorer(s): (Portugal) Madjer (16 goals)
- Best player: (Russia) Leonov

The 2011 FIFA Beach Soccer World Cup qualifiers for UEFA was a beach soccer tournament played in Bibione, Italy from July 11–18, 2010, which determined the four teams that qualified to the 2011 FIFA Beach Soccer World Cup in Ravenna, Italy. All matches were played at a temporary stadium on the beach at Piazzale Zenith in Bibione. The draw for the group stage of the competition was made at the end of June, 2010.

The nations who reached the semi-finals of the tournament achieved qualification for the world cup who were Russia, Ukraine, Switzerland and Portugal. This meant that Spain, who won the 2008 qualifying championship and who came second in 2009, did not even manage to qualify from this year's event for the next world cup, meaning the 2011 world cup will be the first time Spain have not competed in 12 world cups, since the 1997 Beach Soccer World Cup. The overall winners of the tournament, and surprise winners were Ukraine.

By the end of the tournament, over 82,000 people had attended the games at Piazzale Zenith, and over 200,000 people watched the games online.

== Participating teams ==
27 teams confirmed their participation in the competition, the highest ever amount for a world cup qualifier, with several newcomers, showing the ever growing popularity of the sport:

- Andorra
- Austria
- Azerbaijan
- Belarus
- Bulgaria
- Czech Republic
- England
- Estonia
- France
- Germany
- Greece
- Hungary
- Israel
- Italy
- Kazakhstan
- Moldova
- Netherlands
- Norway
- Poland
- Portugal
- Romania
- Russia
- Slovakia
- Spain
- Switzerland
- Turkey
- Ukraine

== Group stage ==
The 27 teams were drawn into 6 groups of 4 teams and one group of 3 teams. The group games took place over a period of three days. The top two teams in the groups automatically qualified for the knockout stage of the tournament. Then, the two best performing teams who finished third in their group were chosen to play in the knockout stage, to make up the numbers.

=== Group A ===
Team	Pld	W	L	GF	GA	GD	Pts
Italy^{[A]}	2	2	0	7	3	+4	6
Turkey	2	1	1	7	5	+2	3
Germany	2	0	2	5	11	-6	0

MATCHES:

Italy	2 – 1	Turkey
Germany	3 – 6	Turkey
Italy	5 – 2	Germany

=== Group B ===
Team	Pld	W	L	GF	GA	GD	Pts
Greece	3	2	1	17	13	+4	6
Spain	3	2	1	15	8	+7	6
Netherlands	3	2	1	12	11	+1	6
Bulgaria	3	0	3	5	17	-12	0

Greece	6 – 5	Netherlands
Spain	7 – 0	Bulgaria
Spain	2 – 3	Netherlands
Greece	6 – 2	Bulgaria
Netherlands	4 – 3	Bulgaria
Spain	6 – 5	Greece

=== Group C ===
Team	Pld	W	L	GF	GA	GD	Pts
Romania	3	3	0	18	8	+10	9
Russia	3	2	1	25	7	+18	6
Slovakia	3	1	2	8	17	-9	3
Andorra	3	0	3	4	23	-19	0

Romania	8 – 2	Andorra
Russia	11 – 1	Slovakia
Romania	5 – 3	Slovakia
Russia	11 – 1	Andorra
Russia	3 – 5	Romania
Andorra	1 – 4	Slovakia

=== Group D ===
Team	Pld	W	L	GF	GA	GD	Pts
Portugal	3	3	0	19	9	+10	9
Estonia	3	1	2	9	10	-1	3
Israel	3	1	2	11	15	-4	3
England	3	1	2	6	11	-5	3

England	1 – 0	Estonia
Portugal	7 – 3	Israel
England	2 – 5	Israel
Portugal	6 – 3	Estonia
Estonia	6 – 3	Israel
Portugal	6 – 3	England

=== Group E ===
Team	Pld	W	L	GF	GA	GD	Pts
Ukraine	3	2	1	18	14	+4	6
Switzerland	3	2	1	22	13	+9	6
Hungary	3	2	1	16	21	-5	5
Belarus	3	0	3	10	18	-8	0

Hungary	7 – 6	Ukraine
Switzerland	7 – 3	Belarus
Hungary	5 – 5^{[C]} (4–3p.)	Belarus
Switzerland	5 – 6	Ukraine
Ukraine	6 – 2	Belarus
Switzerland	10 – 4	Hungary

=== Group F ===
Team	Pld	W	L	GF	GA	GD	Pts
France	3	3	0	26	11	+15	9
Azerbaijan	3	2	1	22	16	+6	6
Czech Republic	3	1	2	14	18	-4	3
Kazakhstan	3	0	3	5	22	-17	0

Czech Republic	4 – 5	Azerbaijan
Kazakhstan	1 – 5	France
France	10 – 8	Azerbaijan
Czech Republic	8 – 2	Kazakhstan
Azerbaijan	9 – 2	Kazakhstan
France	11 – 2	Czech Republic

=== Group G ===
Team	Pld	W	L	GF	GA	GD	Pts
Moldova	3	3	0	7	3	+4	8
Poland	3	2	1	18	10	+8	6
Austria	3	1	2	8	14	-6	3
Norway	3	0	3	8	14	-6	0

Poland	1 - 1^{[C]} (0–1 p.)	Moldova
Norway	2 – 3	Austria
Norway	1 – 3	Moldova
Poland	9 – 4	Austria
Austria	1 – 3	Moldova
Poland	8 – 5	Norway

Notes:

A Italy have already qualified to the 2011 FIFA Beach Soccer World Cup as they are the hosts. In case Italy finishes in the top 4, Europe's fifth berth will be given to the team that finishes fifth in the qualifiers.
B Team won in extra time, therefore 2 points are awarded to the winning side, instead of 3.
C Team won on penalties, therefore 2 points are awarded to the winning side, instead of 3.

== Knockout stage ==
The draw for the knockout stage was made after the preliminary round of games was completed on 13 July. All kickoff times are listed as Italian summer time, (UTC+2).

Round of 16
15 July
Romania	6
Estonia	2
15 July
Ukraine	6
Netherlands	0
15 July
Greece	5
Hungary	8
15 July
Switzerland	6
France	4
15 July
Portugal	5
Azerbaijan	2
15 July
Italy	3
Poland	4
15 July
Russia	11
Turkey	2
15 July
Moldova	1
Spain	5

Quarter-finals
16 July
Romania	3
Ukraine	6
16 July
Hungary	2
Switzerland	3
16 July
Portugal (pen.)	5 (1)
Poland	5 (0)
16 July
Russia	8
Spain	4

Semi-finals
17 July
Ukraine (pen.)	3 (5)
Switzerland	3 (4)
17 July
Portugal	6
Russia	5

Final
18 July
Ukraine	4
Portugal	2
Third place
18 July
Switzerland	2
Russia	5

=== Round of 16 ===
15 July 2010
10:15

Romania	6–2	Estonia

Piazzale Zenith

15 July 2010
11:30

Ukraine	6–0	Netherlands

Piazzale Zenith

15 July 2010
12:45

Greece	5–8	Hungary

Piazzale Zenith

15 July 2010
14:00

Switzerland	6–4	France

Piazzale Zenith

15 July 2010
15:15

Portugal	5–2	Azerbaijan

Piazzale Zenith

15 July 2010
16:30

Russia	11–2	Turkey

Piazzale Zenith

15 July 2010
17:45

Italy	3–4	Poland

Piazzale Zenith

15 July 2010
19:00

Moldova	1–5	Spain

Piazzale Zenith

=== Quarter finals ===
16 July 2010
15:15

Ukraine	6–3	Romania
Nazarenko 10', 35'; Zborovskyi 11'; Dobren (O.G) 17'; Borsuk 19', 35'	Report	Maci 1', 10'; Raj 9'

Piazzale Zenith

16 July 2010
16:30

Hungary	2–3	Switzerland
Ughy 15'; Besenyei 33'	Report	Spacca 18'; Schirinzi 28'; Leu 30'

Piazzale Zenith

16 July 2010
17:45

Poland	5–5 (a.e.t.)	Portugal
Widzicki 5', 35'; Kubiack 15'; Ziober 22'; Waleszczyck 30'	Report	Madjer 4'; Belchior 6', 31'; Alan 17'; Birlo 22'
Penalties
Jarosiewicz (penalty missed)	0–1	Madjer (penalty scored)

Piazzale Zenith

16 July 2010
19:00

Russia	8–4	Spain
Zaikhin 2'; Leonov 3', 33'; Gorchinskiy 28', 34'; Krasheninnikov 31'; Shishin 35', 36'	Report	Juanma 11', 23'; Miguel Beiro 18'; Torres 25'

Piazzale Zenith

=== Semi finals ===
17 July 2010
17:45

Ukraine	3–3 (a.e.t.)	Switzerland
Korniychuk 1'; Nazarenko 3'; Yevdokimov 35'	Report	Stankovic 10', 22'; Leu 21'
Penalties
Borsuk (penalty scored); Yevdokimov (penalty scored); Korniychuk (penalty scored); Pachev (penalty scored); Butko (penalty scored)	5–4	Stankovic (penalty scored); Leu (penalty scored); Ziegler (penalty scored); Rodrigues (penalty scored); Meier (penalty missed)

Piazzale Zenith

17 July 2010
19:00

Portugal	6–5	Russia
Belchior 7', 15'; Madjer 13', 25'; Alan 23'; Novo 30'	Report	Leonov 7', 31'; Shakhmelyan 22'; Shishin 23'; Gorchinskiy 32'

Piazzale Zenith

=== Third place play off ===
18 July 2010
17:45

Switzerland	2–5	Russia
Samuel 5', 22'	Report	Zaikin 9'; Eremeev 16'; Krasheninnikov 27', 29'; Shishin 35'

Piazzale Zenith

=== Final ===
18 July 2010
19:00

Ukraine	4–2	Portugal
Borsuk 8', 13'; Zborovskyi 20'; Yevdokymov 21'	Report	Madjer 19', 22'

Piazzale Zenith

== Winners ==
(2011) FIFA Beach Soccer World Cup:
Qualification (UEFA) Winners

Ukraine
First title

== Awards ==
Best Player (MVP)
(Russia) Ilya Leonov
Top Scorer
(Portugal) Madjer
16 goals
Best Goalkeeper
(Portugal) Paulo Graça

== Teams Qualifying ==
	Team
1st Place	Ukraine
2nd Place	Portugal
3rd Place	Russia
4th Place	Switzerland
5 (World Cup Hosts)	Italy
