= 2013 FIFA Beach Soccer World Cup qualification (UEFA) =

2013 FIFA Beach Soccer World Cup Qualification (UEFA)
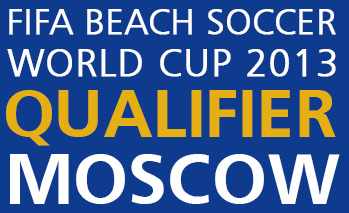

Tournament details
- Host country: Russia
- Dates: 1 – 8 July 2012
- Teams: 24 (from 1 confederation)
- Venue(s): 1 (in 1 host city)

Final positions
- Champions: Spain (3rd title)
- Runners-up: Russia
- Third place: Ukraine
- Fourth place: Netherlands

Tournament statistics
- Matches played: 58
- Goals scored: 457 (7.88 per match)
- Top scorer(s): (Poland) Boguslaw Saganowski (14 goals)
- Best player(s): (Spain) Ramiro Amarelle
- Best goalkeeper: (Ukraine) Vitali Sydorenko

The 2013 FIFA Beach Soccer World Cup qualifiers for UEFA is a beach soccer tournament that was played in Moscow, Russia from 1 – 8 July 2012. It determined the four teams that would qualify for the 2013 FIFA Beach Soccer World Cup in Papeete, Tahiti. All matches were played on two temporary stadium courts at Victory Park at Poklonnaya Hill in Moscow.

== Participating teams and draw ==
24 teams confirmed their participation in the qualifying tournament:

FIFA Beach Soccer World Cup 2013 Qualifying Tournament UEFA Participating Teams
Azerbaijan	England	Greece	Latvia	Poland	Spain
Belarus	Estonia	Hungary	Moldova	Portugal	Switzerland
Bulgaria	France	Israel	Netherlands	Romania	Turkey
Czech Republic	Germany	Italy	Norway	Russia	Ukraine

The draw to divide the 24 teams into six groups of four was conducted on 9 June 2012.

== Group stage ==
All kickoff times are of local time in Moscow (UTC+04:00).

=== Group A ===
Team	Pld	W	W+	L	GF	GA	+/-	Pts
Poland	3	2	1	0	16	6	+10	8
Russia	3	2	0	1	17	6	+11	6
Germany	3	1	0	2	4	9	−5	3
Latvia	3	0	0	3	6	22	−16	0

1 July 2012
12:15

Poland	2–1	Germany
B. Saganowski 11'; P. Friszkemut 20'	Report 1 Report 2	13' O. Romrig

Court 2, Victory Park at Poklonnaya Hill, Moscow

1 July 2012
17:15

Latvia	2–9	Russia
S. Vasiljevs 30'; O. Kravchenko 36'	Report 1 Report 2	3' I. Leonov; 6', 18', 21' A. Makarov; 15', 24', 30', 36' D. Shishin; 27' E. Eremeev

Court 1, Victory Park at Poklonnaya Hill, Moscow

2 July 2012
14:45

Poland	11–3	Latvia
M. Widzicki 1'; W. Ziober 2'; D. Slowinski 3'; B. Saganowski 9', 9', 13', 27'; P. Golanski 10'; P. Friszkemut 12', 16', 35'	Report 1 Report 2	14', 27', 33' A. Dombrovskis

Court 2, Victory Park at Poklonnaya Hill, Moscow

2 July 2012
17:15

Russia	6–1	Germany
A. Shkarin 7'; I. Leonov 17'; D. Shishin 19', 28'; A. Makarov 31', 32'	Report 1 Report 2	22' S. Ullrich

Court 1, Victory Park at Poklonnaya Hill, Moscow

3 July 2012
13:30

Germany	2–1	Latvia
S. Ullrich 2'; O. Romrig 15'	Report 1 Report 2	34' S. Vasiljevs

Court 2, Victory Park at Poklonnaya Hill, Moscow

3 July 2012
19:45

Russia	2–3 (a.e.t.)	Poland
I. Leonov 5'; D. Shishin 9'	Report 1 Report 2	1' W. Ziober; 16', 39' D. Baran

Court 1, Victory Park at Poklonnaya Hill, Moscow

=== Group B ===
Team	Pld	W	W+	L	GF	GA	+/-	Pts
Ukraine	3	3	0	0	9	5	+4	9
Portugal	3	2	0	1	18	6	+12	6
Greece	3	1	0	2	13	15	−2	3
Moldova	3	0	0	3	5	19	−14	0

1 July 2012
16:00

Ukraine	4–3	Greece
A. Borsuk 1'; A. Korniychuk 20', 21'; R. Pachev 23'	Report 1 Report 2	14' I. Delaportas; 32' T. Triantafyllidis; 34' Paris (D. Raptis)

Court 1, Victory Park at Poklonnaya Hill, Moscow

1 July 2012
18:30

Moldova	2–8	Portugal
R. Istrati 32'; Chiper (D. Coicev) 36'	Report 1 Report 2	6', 28' B. Novo; 12', 32' J. Santos; 19', 32' Madjer; 26' (pen.) N. Belchior; 34' A. Cavalcanti

Court 1, Victory Park at Poklonnaya Hill, Moscow

2 July 2012
13:30

Ukraine	3–1	Moldova
A. Borsuk 2', 8'; O. Zborovskyi 9'	Report 1 Report 2	28' V. Budigai

Court 1, Victory Park at Poklonnaya Hill, Moscow

2 July 2012
19:45

Portugal	9–2	Greece
N. Belchior 4', 26', 27', 33'; Madjer 13', 23', 32'; L. Vaz 21'; A. Cavalcanti 31'	Report 1 Report 2	4' K. Papastathopoulos; 14' S. Gkritzalis

Court 1, Victory Park at Poklonnaya Hill, Moscow

3 July 2012
11:00

Greece	8–2	Moldova
P. Stratis 5', 10', 11', 35'; T. Triantafyllidis 5', 33'; N. Bertsias 15'; S. Gkritzalis 26'	Report 1 Report 2	3' A. Negara; 31' V. Baesu

Court 1, Victory Park at Poklonnaya Hill, Moscow

3 July 2012
18:30

Portugal	1–2	Ukraine
J. Santos 7'	Report 1 Report 2	24' A. Butko; 27' I. Borsuk

Court 1, Victory Park at Poklonnaya Hill, Moscow

=== Group C ===
Team	Pld	W	W+	L	GF	GA	+/-	Pts
Belarus	3	2	1	0	12	8	+4	8
Switzerland	3	2	0	1	18	9	+9	6
Azerbaijan	3	1	0	2	9	8	+1	3
England	3	0	0	3	4	18	−14	0

1 July 2012
13:30

Azerbaijan	4–1	England
Elvin Guliyev 6'; Elhad Gulyiyev 7'; E. Kurduv 9'; A. Zeynal 17'	Report 1 Report 2	31' M. Evans

Court 1, Victory Park at Poklonnaya Hill, Moscow

1 July 2012
14:45

Switzerland	4–5 (a.e.t.)	Belarus
S. Spaccarotella 1'; D. Stankovic 2', 29', 30'	Report 1 Report 2	10', 30', 38' V. Bokach; 22', 29' R. Ilyin

Court 2, Victory Park at Poklonnaya Hill, Moscow

2 July 2012
13:30

Azerbaijan	2–3	Belarus
V. Borisov 5'; O. Mammadov 17'	Report 1 Report 2	18' I. Bryshtsel; 22' A. Karpau; 24' V. Bokach

Court 2, Victory Park at Poklonnaya Hill, Moscow

2 July 2012
16:00

Switzerland	10–1	England
M. Jaeggy 3'; M. Rodrigues 5', 22'; D. Stankovic 9', 18', 20', 30', 32'; S. Spaccarotella 17'; D. Ziegler 22'	Report 1 Report 2	8' G. Funnell

Court 1, Victory Park at Poklonnaya Hill, Moscow

3 July 2012
12:15

Switzerland	4–3	Azerbaijan
S. Meier 11', 32'; P. Borer 16'; A. Schirinzi 20'	Report 1 Report 2	17' A. Ali; 34' Elvin Guliyev; 36' E. Kurdov

Court 2, Victory Park at Poklonnaya Hill, Moscow

3 July 2012
13:30

England	2–4	Belarus
T. Bowes 5', 16'	Report 1 Report 2	14' I. Konstantinov; 15' V. Bokach; 17' I. Miranovich; 36' A. Davidovich

Court 1, Victory Park at Poklonnaya Hill, Moscow

=== Group D ===
Team	Pld	W	W+	L	GF	GA	+/-	Pts
Netherlands	3	3	0	0	17	8	+9	9
Spain	3	2	0	1	18	10	+8	6
Turkey	3	1	0	2	12	13	−1	3
Norway	3	0	0	3	7	23	−16	0

1 July 2012
11:00

Turkey	1–6	Netherlands
E. Eriten 20'	Report 1 Report 2	5' P. Tosch; 10', 20', 29', 30' D. Rawidjan; 15' L. Koswal

Court 2, Victory Park at Poklonnaya Hill, Moscow

1 July 2012
12:15

Spain	9–2	Norway
A. Aceiton 6', 17'; Antonio 7', 30', 36'; D. Pajon 8'; R. Amarelle 20'; J. Torres 26'; Sidi 32'	Report 1 Report 2	9' J. Jakobsen; 35' H. Salveson

Court 1, Victory Park at Poklonnaya Hill, Moscow

2 July 2012
12:15

Spain	4–5	Netherlands
R. Amarelle 14', 14'; A. Aceiton 19'; C. Torres 21'	Report 1 Report 2	13' R. Ran; 19', 36' L. Koswal; 33' D. Rawidjan; 36' C. van den Ouweland

Court 1, Victory Park at Poklonnaya Hill, Moscow

2 July 2012
12:15

Turkey	8–2	Norway
Tamer Ay 2'; Y. Ergun 3'; K. Ismail 5', 6', 22', 24'; A. Sezer 26'; O. Zayim 29'	Report 1 Report 2	22' H. Salveson; 33' Senja (T.-R. Sorensen)

Court 2, Victory Park at Poklonnaya Hill, Moscow

3 July 2012
11:00

Netherlands	6–3	Norway
F. van der Geest 18'; D. Rawidjan 20', 35'; D. Summerville 22'; M. van Gessel 22'; P. Ax 35'	Report 1 Report 2	5' J. Jacobsen; 25' Senja (T.-R. Sorensen); 35' E. Hansen

Court 2, Victory Park at Poklonnaya Hill, Moscow

3 July 2012
12:15

Spain	5–3	Turkey
R. Amarelle 1', 31'; J. Torres 10', 26', 35'	Report 1 Report 2	22', 26', 36' E. Eriten

Court 1, Victory Park at Poklonnaya Hill, Moscow

=== Group E ===
Team	Pld	W	W+	L	GF	GA	+/-	Pts
Italy	3	2	1	0	15	9	+6	8
Hungary	3	2	0	1	10	10	0	6
Israel	3	1	0	2	9	10	−1	3
Bulgaria	3	0	0	3	4	9	−5	0

1 July 2012
13:30

Italy	4–2	Bulgaria
P. Palmacci 4', 11'; R. Pasquali 16'; G. Soria 30'	Report 1 Report 2	17', 25' K. Tsvetkov

Court 2, Victory Park at Poklonnaya Hill, Moscow

1 July 2012
14:45

Israel	2–5	Hungary
A. Danin 22'; I. Iloz 35'	Report 1 Report 2	17', 30' F. Besenyei; 20' V. Fekete; 27', 28' M. Ughy

Court 1, Victory Park at Poklonnaya Hill, Moscow

2 July 2012
11:00

Hungary	2–1	Bulgaria
S. Badaklik 8'; P. Jaksa 35'	Report 1 Report 2	36' S. Hristov

Court 2, Victory Park at Poklonnaya Hill, Moscow

2 July 2012
18:30

Italy	4–4 (a.e.t.)	Israel
G. Gori 13'; D. Maradona 14', 23'; D. Ramaciotti 14'	Report 1 Report 2	9' A. Danin; 13', 23' I. Iloz; 36' A. Levi
Penalties
M. Leghissa (penalty scored); D. Maradona (penalty scored); R. Pasquali (penalty scored); C. Sciutto (penalty scored)	4–3	(penalty scored) A. Yatim; (penalty scored) I. Iloz; (penalty scored) Y. Badash; (penalty missed) N. Sapir

Court 1, Victory Park at Poklonnaya Hill, Moscow

3 July 2012
16:00

Israel	3–1	Bulgaria
Y. Badash 35', 36'; I. Iloz 36' (pen.)	Report 1 Report 2	9' F. Filipov

Court 1, Victory Park at Poklonnaya Hill, Moscow

3 July 2012
17:15

Italy	7–3	Hungary
S. Marinai 7', 16'; G. Soria 11' (pen.); G. Gori 13', 24' (pen.); D. Ramaciotti 16'; F. Corosiniti 24'	Report 1 Report 2	12' (pen.) P. Abel; 29' P. Jaksa; 29' M. Ughy

Court 1, Victory Park at Poklonnaya Hill, Moscow

=== Group F ===
Team	Pld	W	W+	L	GF	GA	+/-	Pts
Czech Republic	3	2	0	1	15	11	+4	6
France	3	2	0	1	12	12	0	6
Romania	3	1	0	2	12	14	−2	3
Estonia	3	1	0	2	9	11	−2	3

1 July 2012
11:00

Romania	5–3	Estonia
M. Posteuca 8', 21'; I. Gândac 18'; L. Chirila 30'; Maci 34'	Report 1 Report 2	2' (pen.) A. Saharov; 29' A. Aniko; 21' Galkin

Court 1, Victory Park at Poklonnaya Hill, Moscow

1 July 2012
19:45

France	4–6	Czech Republic
J. Basquaise 9', 35'; D. Fort 21'; M. Pagis 25'	Report 1 Report 2	9', 36' J. Kovarik; 15' D. Filinger; 23', 28' M. Chalupa; 24' M. Kubice

Court 1, Victory Park at Poklonnaya Hill, Moscow

2 July 2012
11:00

Romania	4–7	Czech Republic
R. Cărăuleanu 15'; Maci 26'; I. Gândac 31'; A. Tănase 36'	Report 1 Report 2	12' T. Hurab; 14' D. Filinger; 15', 35' P. Stejskal; 19' M. Chalupa; 26' M. Bocek; 36' J. Kovarik

Court 1, Victory Park at Poklonnaya Hill, Moscow

2 July 2012
14:45

France	4–3	Estonia
M. Pagis 10'; D. Samoun 14'; J.-M. Edouard 15'; J. Basquaise 24'	Report 1 Report 2	5' T. Tammo; 31' A. Saharov; 32' M. Lukk

Court 1, Victory Park at Poklonnaya Hill, Moscow

3 July 2012
14:45

Romania	3–4	France
I. Gândac 9'; L. Croituru 21'; M. Posteuca 31'	Report 1 Report 2	7' S. François; 12' F. Mendy; 15' (o.g.) I. Gândac; 21' M. Pagis

Court 1, Victory Park at Poklonnaya Hill, Moscow

3 July 2012
14:45

Czech Republic	2–3	Estonia
T. Hurab 31'; L. Karda 33'	Report 1 Report 2	10' I. Siska; 23' A. Aniko; 33' A. Saharov

Court 2, Victory Park at Poklonnaya Hill, Moscow

== Playoff stage ==
All kickoff times are of local time in Moscow (UTC+04:00).

=== Round of 16 ===
4 July 2012
11:00

Belarus	4–3	Greece
I. Miranovich 14'; R. Ilyin 17'; I. Konstantinov 20'; I. Bryshtsel 29'	Report 1 Report 2	6', 27', 36' P. Stratis

Court 1, Victory Park at Poklonnaya Hill, Moscow

4 July 2012
12:15

Netherlands	4–3	Israel
L. Koswal 3' (pen.); C. Van Den Ouweland 13'; S. Abu 16' (o.g.); P. Ax 23'	Report 1 Report 2	10' A.A. Nakache; 24' (pen.) Y. Badash; 27' A. Yatim

Court 1, Victory Park at Poklonnaya Hill, Moscow

4 July 2012
13:30

Czech Republic	3–6	Hungary
M. Chalupa 11', 13'; L. Karda 26'	Report 1 Report 2	7' Sz. Badalik; 8' M. Ughy; 9' V. Fekete; 12' P. Jaksa; 16' F. Besenyei; 33' T. Weisz

Court 1, Victory Park at Poklonnaya Hill, Moscow

4 July 2012
14:45

Poland	6–5	Azerbaijan
D. Slowinski 2'; B. Saganowski 7', 26', 33'; P. Golanski 10'; W. Ziober 13'	Report 1 Report 2	6' E. Akhmadov; 9' (o.g.) K. Grzegorczyk; 10' A. Zeynal; 23' A. Aliyev; 33' A. Elhad

Court 1, Victory Park at Poklonnaya Hill, Moscow

4 July 2012
16:00

Ukraine	7–4	Turkey
O. Zborovskyi 7', 28'; K. Andrieiev 10'; A. Butko 11'; I. Borsuk 14'; R. Pachev 21'; A. Korniychuk 26'	Report 1 Report 2	2', 26' E. Eriten; 6' Tamer Ay; 15' K. Ismail

Court 1, Victory Park at Poklonnaya Hill, Moscow

4 July 2012
17:15

Russia	8–7	Switzerland
Y. Krasheninnikov 3'; E. Eremeev 12', 20'; E. Shaykov 13', 32'; A. Makarov 17'; D. Shishin 22', 27'	Report 1 Report 2	8', 13', 23' D. Stankovic; 8', 36' M. Rodrigues; 11' P. Borer; 34' M. Jaeggy

Court 1, Victory Park at Poklonnaya Hill, Moscow

4 July 2012
18:30

Italy	2–6	Spain
F. Corosiniti 6'; M. Leghissa 34'	Report 1 Report 2	10' J. Lima; 11' R. Amarelle; 11', 35' J. Torres; 15' Kuman; 27' C. Torres

Court 1, Victory Park at Poklonnaya Hill, Moscow

4 July 2012
19:45

Portugal	3–3 (a.e.t.)	France
N. Belchior 3', 13'; Madjer 15' (pen.)	Report 1 Report 2	25', 33' J. Basquaise; 29' S. François
Penalties
Madjer (penalty scored); N. Belchior (penalty scored); J. Santos (penalty scored); L. Carmo (penalty missed)	3–4	(penalty scored) J.-M. Edouard; (penalty scored) S. François; (penalty scored) D. Samoun; (penalty scored) J. Basquaise

Court 1, Victory Park at Poklonnaya Hill, Moscow

For the first time in the FIFA Beach Soccer World Cup UEFA Qualifying tournament, a straight knockout stage was not used. Instead, the eight winners of the Round of 16 were divided into two groups of four. The compositions of the groups were formed on the basis of the composite ranking based on the results of the first group stage and the Round of 16.

Group G consisted of the Round of 16 winners with the 1st, 4th, 5th and 8th best records, while Group H consisted of the Round of 16 winners with the 2nd, 3rd, 6th and 7th best records. The group winners would play in the final, while the second-place teams would play for third place. In any event, the top two teams in each group would qualify for the 2013 FIFA Beach Soccer World Cup.

=== Group G ===
Team	Pld	W	W+	L	GF	GA	+/-	Pts
Russia	3	3	0	0	15	9	+6	9
Netherlands	3	1	1	1	10	10	0	5
France	3	0	1	2	15	18	−3	2
Belarus	3	0	0	3	13	16	−3	0

5 July 2012
17:15

Belarus	3–5	Russia
V. Bokach 2'; I. Bryshtsel 11', 19'	Report 1 Report 2	11' E. Shaykov; 14' (o.g.) I. Bryshtsel; 17' D. Shishin; 28', 34' A. Makarov

Court 1, Victory Park at Poklonnaya Hill, Moscow

5 July 2012
18:30

France	4–4 (a.e.t.)	Netherlands
J. Basquaise 1', 18'; M. Pagis 30'; S. François 34'	Report 1 Report 2	1', 1', 27' M. van Gessel; 21' (pen.) P. Tosch
Penalties
J.-M. Edouard (penalty scored); S. François (penalty scored); A. Fayos (penalty scored); J. Basquaise (penalty scored); M. Pagis (penalty scored); D. Samoun (penalty missed); A. Mendy (penalty missed)	5–6	(penalty scored) D. Rawidjan; (penalty scored) P. Tosch; (penalty scored) P. Ax; (penalty scored) M. van Gessel; (penalty scored) C. van den Ouweland; (penalty missed) D. Summerville; (penalty scored) F. Kaleveld

Court 1, Victory Park at Poklonnaya Hill, Moscow

6 July 2012
17:15

Belarus	6–6 (a.e.t.)	France
V. Krupitsa 6'; A. Karpau 13' (pen.); I. Bryshtsel 15'; I. Trafimau 17'; P. Shvayba 27'; I. Miranovich 38'	Report 1 Report 2	1', 25' M. Pagis; 2' J. Basquaise; 6', 37' D. Samoun; 29' (pen.) A. Mendy
Penalties
I. Bryshtsel (penalty scored); V. Krupitsa (penalty scored); V. Bokach (penalty scored); R. Ilyin (penalty missed); I. Miranovich (penalty scored); I. Trafimau (penalty scored); A. Davidovich (penalty missed)	5–6	(penalty scored) J. Basquaise; (penalty scored) S. François; (penalty scored) M. Pagis; (penalty missed) D. Samoun; (penalty scored) R. Tossem; (penalty scored) A. Fayos; (penalty scored) J.-M. Edouard

Court 1, Victory Park at Poklonnaya Hill, Moscow

6 July 2012
18:30

Netherlands	1–2	Russia
P. Tosch 28'	Report 1 Report 2	14' (pen.) D. Shishin; 20' A. Makarov

Court 1, Victory Park at Poklonnaya Hill, Moscow

7 July 2012
16:00

Netherlands	5–4	Belarus
R. Liefden 16'; P. Tosch 21'; C. van den Ouweland 27'; M. van Gessel 30'; D. Rawidjan 35'	Report 1 Report 2	10' R. Ilyin; 12' I. Trafimau; 24' I. Bryshtsel; 29' A. Karpau

Court 1, Victory Park at Poklonnaya Hill, Moscow

7 July 2012
19:45

Russia	8–5	France
D. Ippolitov 6'; A. Makarov 7'; D. Shishin 9', 30', 36'; I. Leonov 14', 23'; A. Shkarin 23'	Report 1 Report 2	5', 15', 28' M. Pagis; 8' J. Basquaise; 14' S. François

Court 1, Victory Park at Poklonnaya Hill, Moscow

=== Group H ===
Team	Pld	W	W+	L	GF	GA	+/-	Pts
Spain	3	2	1	0	14	8	+6	8
Ukraine	3	2	0	1	14	11	+3	6
Poland	3	1	0	2	14	15	−1	3
Hungary	3	0	0	3	6	14	−8	0

5 July 2012
16:00

Hungary	2–3	Ukraine
V. Fekete 5'; F. Besenyei 14'	Report 1 Report 2	1', 36' O. Zborovskyi; 4' R. Pachev

Court 1, Victory Park at Poklonnaya Hill, Moscow

5 July 2012
19:45

Poland	3–5	Spain
B. Saganowski 1', 14'; W. Ziober 31'	Report 1 Report 2	3' Antonio; 19', 33' J. Lima; 23' C. Torres; 28' (pen.) R. Amarelle

Court 1, Victory Park at Poklonnaya Hill, Moscow

6 July 2012
16:00

Poland	7–3	Hungary
D. Baran 5'; B. Saganowski 7', 19', 31'; W. Ziober 11'; K. Grzegorczyk 17'; D. Burzawa 34'	Report 1 Report 2	8' (pen.) F. Besenyei; 26' (pen.) P. Jaksa; 34' M. Ughy

Court 1, Victory Park at Poklonnaya Hill, Moscow

6 July 2012
19:45

Ukraine	4–5 (a.e.t.)	Spain
J. Lima 12' (o.g.); A. Borsuk 33' (pen.); O. Zborovskyi 36'; A. Yevdokymov 36'	Report 1 Report 2	15', 39' R. Amarelle; 21' J. Torres; 27' J. Lima; 32' C. Torres

Court 1, Victory Park at Poklonnaya Hill, Moscow

7 July 2012
17:15

Ukraine	7–4	Poland
A. Cherevko 8'; R. Pachev 8', 12', 24', 25'; A. Borsuk 9'; O. Zborovskyi 18'	Report 1 Report 2	10', 20' W. Ziober; 14' B. Saganowski; 29' P. Friszkemut

Court 1, Victory Park at Poklonnaya Hill, Moscow

7 July 2012
18:30

Spain	4–1	Hungary
C. Mendez 3'; Kuman 23'; A. Aceiton 23'; D. Pajon 28'	Report 1 Report 2	9' F. Besenyei

Court 1, Victory Park at Poklonnaya Hill, Moscow

=== Third place play off ===
8 July 2012
18:30

Netherlands	0–3	Ukraine
	Report 1 Report 2	13' A. Yevdokymov; 26' R. Pachev; 28' A. Korniychuk

Court 1, Victory Park at Poklonnaya Hill, Moscow

=== Final ===
8 July 2012
19:45

Russia	3–5	Spain
Y. Krasheninnikov 6'; I. Leonov 10'; Y. Gorchinskiy 24'	Report 1 Report 2	4' R. Amarelle; 15' A. Aceiton; 19' J. Lima; 23' Kuman; 28' F. Donaire

Court 1, Victory Park at Poklonnaya Hill, Moscow

== Winners ==
2013 FIFA Beach Soccer World Cup:
Qualification (UEFA) Winners

Spain
Third title

== Awards ==
Best Player (MVP)
(Spain) Ramiro Amarelle
Top Scorer
(Poland) Boguslaw Saganowski
14 goals
Best Goalkeeper
(Ukraine) Vitali Sydorenko

== Teams Qualifying ==
	Team
1st Place	Spain
2nd Place	Russia
3rd Place	Ukraine
4th Place	Netherlands

== Goalscorers ==
14 goals

- (Poland) B. Saganowski

13 goals

- (Russia) D. Shishin

12 goals

- (Russia) A. Makarov

11 goals

- (Switzerland) D. Stankovic

10 goals

- (France) M. Pagis

9 goals

- (Spain) R. Amarelle
- (France) J. Basquaise

8 goals

- (Netherlands) D. Rawidjan
- (Ukraine) R. Pachev

7 goals

- (Greece) P. Stratis
- (Portugal) N. Belchior
- (Spain) J. Torres
- (Poland) W. Ziober
- (Russia) I. Leonov
- (Turkey) E. Eriten
- (Ukraine) A. Borsuk
- (Ukraine) O. Zborovskyi

6 goals

- (Belarus) V. Bokach
- (Belarus) I. Bryshtsel
- (Hungary) F. Besenyei
- (Portugal) Madjer

5 goals

- (Czech Republic) M. Chalupa
- (Netherlands) M. van Gessel
- (Poland) P. Friszkemut
- (Spain) J. Lima
- (Spain) A. Aceiton
- (Turkey) K. Ismail

4 goals

- (Belarus) R. Ilyin
- (France) S. François
- (Israel) I. Iloz
- (Hungary) M. Ughy
- (Hungary) V. Fekete
- (Hungary) P. Jaksa
- (Netherlands) L. Koswal
- (Netherlands) P. Tosch
- (Spain) Antonio
- (Spain) C. Torres
- (Switzerland) M. Rodrigues
- (Ukraine) A. Korniychuk

3 goals

- (Belarus) I. Miranovich
- (Belarus) A. Karpov
- (Czech Republic) J. Kovarik
- (Estonia) A. Saharov
- (France) D. Samoun
- (Greece) T. Triantafyllidis
- (Israel) Y. Badash
- (Italy) G. Gori
- (Latvia) A. Dombrovskis
- (Netherlands) C. van den Ouweland
- (Poland) D. Baran
- (Romania) I. Gândac
- (Romania) M. Posteuca
- (Russia) E. Eremeev
- (Russia) E. Shaykov
- (Portugal) J. Santos
- (Spain) Kuman

2 goals

- (Azerbaijan) Elvin Guliyev
- (Azerbaijan) E. Kurduv
- (Azerbaijan) A. Zeynal
- (Belarus) I. Konstantinov
- (Belarus) I. Trofimov
- (Bulgaria) K. Tsvetkov
- (Czech Republic) D. Filinger
- (Czech Republic) P. Stejskal
- (Czech Republic) T. Hurab
- (Czech Republic) L. Karda
- (England) T. Bowes
- (Estonia) A. Aniko
- (France) F. Mendy
- (Germany) O. Romrig
- (Germany) S. Ullrich
- (Greece) S. Gkritzalis
- (Hungary) S. Badaklik
- (Israel) A. Danin
- (Italy) P. Palmacci
- (Italy) D. Maradona
- (Italy) G. Soria
- (Italy) D. Ramaciotti
- (Italy) S. Marinai
- (Italy) F. Corosiniti
- (Latvia) S. Vasiljevs
- (Netherlands) P. Ax
- (Norway) H. Salveson
- (Norway) J. Jakobsen
- (Norway) T.-R. Sorensen
- (Poland) D. Słowiński
- (Poland) P. Golański
- (Portugal) B. Novo
- (Portugal) A. Cavalcanti
- (Romania) Maci
- (Russia) Y. Krashenninikov
- (Spain) D. Pajon
- (Switzerland) S. Spaccarotella
- (Switzerland) S. Meier
- (Switzerland) M. Jaeggy
- (Switzerland) P. Borer
- (Turkey) Tamer Ay
- (Ukraine) A. Butko
- (Ukraine) A. Yevdokymov

1 goal

- (Azerbaijan) Elhad Guliyev
- (Azerbaijan) V. Borisov
- (Azerbaijan) O. Mammadov
- (Azerbaijan) A. Ali
- (Azerbaijan) E. Akhmadov
- (Azerbaijan) A. Aliyev
- (Azerbaijan) A. Elhad
- (Belarus) A. Davidovich
- (Belarus) V. Krupitsa
- (Belarus) P. Shvayba
- (Bulgaria) S. Hristov
- (Bulgaria) F. Filipov
- (Czech Republic) M. Kubice
- (Czech Republic) M. Bocek
- (England) M. Evans
- (England) G. Funnell
- (Estonia) Galkin
- (Estonia) T. Tammo
- (Estonia) M. Lukk
- (Estonia) I. Siska
- (France) D. Fort
- (France) J.-M. Edouard
- (Greece) I. Delaportas
- (Greece) D. Raptis
- (Greece) K. Papastathopoulos
- (Greece) N. Bertsias
- (Hungary) P. Abel
- (Hungary) T. Weisz
- (Israel) A. Levi
- (Israel) A. Nakache
- (Israel) A. Yatim
- (Italy) R. Pasquali
- (Italy) M. Leghissa
- (Latvia) O. Kravchenko
- (Moldova) R. Istrati
- (Moldova) D. Coicev
- (Moldova) V. Budigai
- (Moldova) A. Negara
- (Moldova) V. Baesu
- (Netherlands) R. Ran
- (Netherlands) F. van der Geest
- (Netherlands) D. Summerville
- (Netherlands) R. Liefden
- (Norway) E. Hansen
- (Poland) M. Widzicki
- (Poland) K. Grzegorczyk
- (Poland) D. Burzawa
- (Portugal) L. Vaz
- (Romania) L. Chirila
- (Romania) R. Cărăuleanu
- (Romania) A. Tănase
- (Romania) L. Croituru
- (Russia) A. Shkarin
- (Russia) D. Ippolitov
- (Russia) Y. Gorchinskiy
- (Spain) Sidi
- (Spain) C. Mendes
- (Spain) F. Donaire
- (Switzerland) D. Ziegler
- (Switzerland) A. Schirinzi
- (Turkey) Y. Ergun
- (Turkey) A. Sezer
- (Turkey) O. Zayim
- (Ukraine) K. Andrieiev
- (Ukraine) J. Lima
- (Ukraine) A. Cherevko

Own goals

- (Romania) I. Gândac (playing against France)
- (Israel) S. Abu (playing against Netherlands)
- (Poland) K. Grzegorczyk (playing against Azerbaijan)
- (Belarus) I. Bryshtsel (playing against Russia)
