= 2015 FIFA Beach Soccer World Cup qualification (UEFA) =

2015 FIFA Beach Soccer World Cup Qualification (UEFA)
Tournament details
- Host country: Italy
- City: Jesolo
- Dates: 5–14 September 2014
- Teams: 24 (from 1 confederation)
- Venue: 1 (in 1 host city)

Final positions
- Champions: Russia (1st title)
- Runners-up: Switzerland
- Third place: Italy
- Fourth place: Spain

Tournament statistics
- Matches played: 73
- Goals scored: 581 (7.96 per match)
- Top scorer: (Switzerland) Dejan Stankovic
- Best player: (Italy) Dario Ramacciotti
- Best goalkeeper: (Switzerland) Valentin Jaeggy

The UEFA qualifiers for the 2015 FIFA Beach Soccer World Cup was a beach soccer tournament which took place in Jesolo, Italy between 5–14 September 2014. The tournament served as the FIFA Beach Soccer World Cup qualifier for teams from UEFA, where the top four teams qualified for the 2015 FIFA Beach Soccer World Cup in Portugal.

This was the second time that the Beach Soccer World Cup qualifiers were held in Italy. All matches were played at the Beach Arena del Faro di Jesolo in the Lido di Jesolo beach area.

== Participating teams and draw ==
The following 24 teams entered the tournament.

- Austria
- Azerbaijan
- Belarus
- Bulgaria
- Czech Republic
- England
- Estonia
- France
- Georgia (withdrew)
- Germany
- Greece
- Hungary
- Italy (hosts)
- Latvia
- Moldova
- Norway
- Poland
- Romania
- Russia
- Slovakia
- Spain
- Switzerland
- Turkey
- Ukraine

The draw of the tournament was held on 18 July 2014 in Jesolo. The 24 teams were drawn into six groups of four teams for the first stage.

== First stage ==
Each team earns three points for a win in regulation time, two points for a win in extra time, one point for a win in a penalty shoot-out, and no points for a defeat.

Legend
The top two teams from each group and the best four third-placed teams advance to the second stage

All times are local, Central European Summer Time (UTC+2).

=== Group A ===
Team	Pld	WR	WE	WP	L	GF	GA	GD	Pts
Italy	3	2	0	1	0	18	8	+10	7
England	3	2	0	0	1	13	12	+1	6
Greece	3	1	0	0	2	16	13	+3	3
Moldova	3	0	0	0	3	13	27	−14	0

5 September 2014
11:30

England	5–3	Greece
P. Farquharson 3'; J. Morris 6'; M. Corbett 17' (pen.); A. Clarke 20'; M. Day 30'	Report 1 Report 2	T. Triantafyllidis 5', 22'; S. Amanatidis 26'

Beach Arena del Faro di Jesolo, Jesolo
5 September 2014
17:45

Moldova	3–11	Italy
V. Baesu 3', 5'; V. Budigai 35'	Report 1 Report 2	F. Corosiniti 3', 5', 27', 31'; P. Palmacci 3', 11', 24'; S. Dei Mestre 7'; G. Gori 12', 16'; D. Ramacciotti 36'

Beach Arena del Faro di Jesolo, Jesolo

6 September 2014
10:15

England	6–5	Moldova
M. Mitchell 4'; M. Corbett 12', 27'; A. Clarke 32'; M. Day 33', 33'	Report 1 Report 2	A. Negara 20', 32'; V. Baesu 22', 23'; L. Podlsenov 35'

Beach Arena del Faro di Jesolo, Jesolo
6 September 2014
17:45

Italy	3–3 (a.e.t.)	Greece
G. Gori 6'; A. Frainetti 28'; D. Ramacciotti 30'	Report 1 Report 2	F. Corosiniti 13' (o.g.); A. Thomas 19'; P. Gkritzalis 21'
Penalties
G. Gori (penalty scored); A. Frainetti (penalty scored); D. Ramacciotti (penalty scored)	3–2	(penalty scored) P. Paris; (penalty scored) T. Triantafyllidis; (penalty missed) K. Papastathopoulos

Beach Arena del Faro di Jesolo, Jesolo

7 September 2014
10:15

Greece	10–5	Moldova
M. Kafantaris 4', 10', 18'; P. Gkritzatis 7'; G. Karakasis 8'; T. Triantafyllidis 16' (pen.), 35', 35'; V. Comilionoc 21' (o.g.); K. Papastathopoulos 32'	Report 1 Report 2	D. Banar 4', 35'; V. Comilionoc 19'; V. Lungu 26'; L. Podlesnov 35'

Beach Arena del Faro di Jesolo, Jesolo
7 September 2014
17:45

Italy	4–2	England
P. Palmacci 7'; M. Marrucci 9'; M. di Palma 13'; D. Ramacciotti 22' (pen.)	Report 1 Report 2	J. Temple 18'; J. Morris 22'

Beach Arena del Faro di Jesolo, Jesolo

=== Group B ===
Team	Pld	WR	WE	WP	L	GF	GA	GD	Pts
Russia	2	2	0	0	0	7	3	+4	6
Belarus	2	1	0	0	1	4	5	−1	3
Turkey	2	0	0	0	2	2	5	−3	0
Georgia	Withdrew								

5 September 2014
12:45

Belarus	2–1	Turkey
V. Bokach 9'; I. Kanstantsinau 19'	Report 1 Report 2	C. Keskin 25'

Beach Arena del Faro di Jesolo, Jesolo

6 September 2014
16:30

Russia	3–1	Turkey
A. Peremetin 11'; K. Romanov 25'; Y. Krashennikov 31'	Report 1 Report 2	E. Anzafioglu 15'

Beach Arena del Faro di Jesolo, Jesolo

7 September 2014
16:30

Russia	4–2	Belarus
Y. Krashennikov 9', 16'; A. Paporotnyi 17'; D. Shishin 34'	Report 1 Report 2	I. Bryshtel 1'; A. Slavutsin 9'

Beach Arena del Faro di Jesolo, Jesolo

=== Group C ===
Team	Pld	WR	WE	WP	L	GF	GA	GD	Pts
Spain	3	3	0	0	0	23	4	+19	9
Azerbaijan	3	2	0	0	1	10	8	+2	6
Czech Republic	3	1	0	0	2	6	18	−12	3
Bulgaria	3	0	0	0	3	7	16	−9	0

5 September 2014
09:00

Czech Republic	1–4	Azerbaijan
M. Chalupa 12'	Report 1 Report 2	S. Allahgulu 14'; A. Huseynov 23', 26'; A. Zeynalov 27'

Beach Arena del Faro di Jesolo, Jesolo
5 September 2014
15:15

Bulgaria	1–8	Spain
F. Filipov 15' (pen.)	Report 1 Report 2	Dona 5'; Ezequiel 9'; R. Merida 14', 33'; Llorenç 16'; Antonio 17'; Juanma 28', 33'

Beach Arena del Faro di Jesolo, Jesolo

7 September 2014
09:00

Czech Republic	5–4	Bulgaria
I. Hasek 1'; F. Vyhnal 14'; D. Radosta 18', 22'; M. Chalupa 21'	Report 1 Report 2	F. Filipov 26', 33', 34'; G. Minkov 27'

Beach Arena del Faro di Jesolo, Jesolo
7 September 2014
15:15

Spain	5–3	Azerbaijan
Chiky 8'; Llorenç 12', 18'; R. Merida 22'; Kuman 33'	Report 1 Report 2	S. Allahgulu 13', 16'; A. Nazarov 23'

Beach Arena del Faro di Jesolo, Jesolo

8 September 2014
14:00

Azerbaijan	3–2	Bulgaria
H. Bagirov 20'; S. Allahgulu 25'; A. Nazarov 26'	Report 1 Report 2	F. Filipov 9'; M. Velikov 11'

Beach Arena del Faro di Jesolo, Jesolo
8 September 2014
16:30

Spain	10–0	Czech Republic
Llorenç 1', 2', 9', 17', 29', 35'; Chiky 7', 14'; Ezequiel 17', 30'	Report 1 Report 2

Beach Arena del Faro di Jesolo, Jesolo

=== Group D ===
Team	Pld	WR	WE	WP	L	GF	GA	GD	Pts
Switzerland	3	3	0	0	0	25	5	+20	9
France	3	2	0	0	1	16	11	+5	6
Estonia	3	1	0	0	2	8	11	−3	3
Slovakia	3	0	0	0	3	6	28	−22	0

5 September 2014
10:15

Slovakia	0–14	Switzerland
	Report 1 Report 2	N. Stalder 2'; D. Stankovic 3', 24', 26', 28', 33'; M. Jaeggy 6', 19', 36'; O. Noel 11'; P. Borer 14'; S. Spaccarotella 18', 34'; S. Lutz 22'

Beach Arena del Faro di Jesolo, Jesolo
5 September 2014
14:00

France	4–1	Estonia
S. François 4'; J. Basquaise 10', 22'; C. Lauthe 15'	Report 1 Report 2	K. Marmor 31'

Beach Arena del Faro di Jesolo, Jesolo

7 September 2014
12:45

Switzerland	4–3	Estonia
M. Jaeggy 12'; D. Stankovic 22'; S. Spaccarotella 30'; O. Noel 32' (pen.)	Report 1 Report 2	K. Marmor 9', 26'; A. Saharov 36'

Beach Arena del Faro di Jesolo, Jesolo
7 September 2014
14:00

France	10–3	Slovakia
M. Pagis 4', 16', 23'; S. François 11'; N. Boucenna 18', 20', 29'; J. Basquaise 22'; A. Barbotti 24'; Y. Fischer 26'	Report 1 Report 2	M. Kanyai 5'; P. Bures 6'; T. Obert 31'

Beach Arena del Faro di Jesolo, Jesolo

9 September 2014
11:30

Estonia	4–3	Slovakia
K. Marmor 2'; M. Lukk 5'; A. Saharov 15'; M. Truusalu 33'	Report 1 Report 2	P. Bures 17', 32'; M. Smalik 32'

Beach Arena del Faro di Jesolo, Jesolo
9 September 2014
16:30

Switzerland	7–2	France
D. Stankovic 4', 7', 12', 16'; S. Leu 9'; O. Noel 11'; M. Jaeggy 36'	Report 1 Report 2	D. Samoun 25'; M. Pagis 28'

Beach Arena del Faro di Jesolo, Jesolo

=== Group E ===
Team	Pld	WR	WE	WP	L	GF	GA	GD	Pts
Ukraine	3	3	0	0	0	15	4	+11	9
Germany	3	2	0	0	1	10	7	+3	6
Norway	3	1	0	0	2	8	13	−5	3
Latvia	3	0	0	0	3	5	14	−9	0

6 September 2014
12:45

Germany	3–2	Norway
O. Romrig 8', 28'; S. Weirauch 30'	Report 1 Report 2	R. Kandal 7'; P. Nergaard 15'

Beach Arena del Faro di Jesolo, Jesolo
6 September 2014
15:15

Latvia	1–4	Ukraine
R. Solomevics 10'	Report 1 Report 2	O. Zborowski 2', 33'; A. Borsuk 29'; R. Pachev 34'

Beach Arena del Faro di Jesolo, Jesolo

8 September 2014
12:45

Germany	5–1	Latvia
S. Weirauch 2', 22'; A. Kniller 6'; O. Romrig 25'; C. Thurk 30'	Report 1 Report 2	S. Vasiljevs 26'

Beach Arena del Faro di Jesolo, Jesolo
8 September 2014
17:45

Ukraine	7–1	Norway
V. Panteleiciuc 1'; O. Budzko 4'; D. Medved 9', 21'; V. Sidorenko 23'; O. Zborowski 26'; I. Borsuk 27'	Report 1 Report 2	J. Jacobsen 33'

Beach Arena del Faro di Jesolo, Jesolo

9 September 2014
14:00

Norway	5–3	Latvia
J. Kristoffersson 6'; R. Kandal 14', 15'; H. Salveson 27', 33'	Report 1 Report 2	D. Jakovlevs 17', 20' (pen.); S. Vasiljevs 30'

Beach Arena del Faro di Jesolo, Jesolo
9 September 2014
17:45

Ukraine	4–2	Germany
A. Borsuk 10'; O. Budzko 20'; K. Andreev 22'; A. Korniichuk 26'	Report 1 Report 2	O. Romrig 20' (pen.); C. Biermann 32'

Beach Arena del Faro di Jesolo, Jesolo

=== Group F ===
Team	Pld	WR	WE	WP	L	GF	GA	GD	Pts
Romania	3	2	0	0	1	13	11	+2	6
Poland	3	2	0	0	1	12	11	+1	6
Hungary	3	1	0	0	2	8	8	0	3
Austria	3	1	0	0	2	13	16	−3	3

6 September 2014
09:00

Romania	4–2	Hungary
R. Carauleanu 8'; I. Florea 13'; P. Posteuca 20'; M. Machuca 28'	Report 1 Report 2	P. Abel 17'; G. Simonyi 20'

Beach Arena del Faro di Jesolo, Jesolo
6 September 2014
14:00

Austria	5–7	Poland
S. Abraham 4'; T. Trauner 5', 10'; P. Peterstorfer 22'; S. Stichlberger 32'	Report 1 Report 2	P. Frishkemut 4', 31', 36'; W. Ziober 8', 17'; B. Saganowski 10', 24'

Beach Arena del Faro di Jesolo, Jesolo

8 September 2014
11:30

Romania	5–7	Austria
M. Machuca 3', 13'; I. Florea 7'; P. Posteuca 16'; R. Carauleanu 22'	Report 1 Report 2	S. Abraham 4', 14'; P. Bruckner 21'; C. Oberegger 24'; P. Bruckner 28'; S. Hakim 32'; A. Gahleitner 34'

Beach Arena del Faro di Jesolo, Jesolo
8 September 2014
15:15

Poland	3–2	Hungary
B. Saganowski 3'; P. Taraszkowski 32'; W. Ziober 34'	Report 1 Report 2	V. Fekete 6'; M. Ughy 21'

Beach Arena del Faro di Jesolo, Jesolo

9 September 2014
12:45

Hungary	4–1	Austria
F. Imps 16', 33'; V. Fekete 28'; P. Abel 28'	Report 1 Report 2	P. Bruckner 25'

Beach Arena del Faro di Jesolo, Jesolo
9 September 2014
15:15

Poland	2–4	Romania
P. Frishkemut 13'; D. Burzawa 34'	Report 1 Report 2	M. Machuca 6', 13', 13'; D. Zaharia 31'

Beach Arena del Faro di Jesolo, Jesolo

== Second stage ==
Legend
The top team from each group qualify for the 2015 FIFA Beach Soccer World Cup

=== Group 1 ===
Team	Pld	WR	WE	WP	L	GF	GA	GD	Pts
Italy	3	2	1	0	0	17	8	+9	8
Belarus	3	2	0	0	1	13	8	+5	6
Estonia	3	1	0	0	2	11	16	−5	3
Poland	3	0	0	0	3	10	19	−9	0

10 September 2014
10:15

Belarus	8–2	Poland
I. Konstantinov 7', 12'; O. Slautin 15'; I. Brishtel 23', 24'; V. Bokach 29'; A. Karpov 31'; R. Ilyin 35'	Report 1 Report 2	W. Ziober 5'; B. Piechnik 22'

Beach Arena del Faro di Jesolo, Jesolo
10 September 2014
17:45

Estonia	3–8	Italy
K. Marmor 3', 35'; A. Saharov 30'	Report 1 Report 2	G. Gori 1', 15', 21', 24'; P. Palmacci 5'; E. Zurlo 8'; D. Ramacciotti 30', 33'

Beach Arena del Faro di Jesolo, Jesolo

11 September 2014
12:45

Belarus	3–2	Estonia
V. Bokach 4'; I. Brishtel 11'; I. Miranovich 36'	Report 1 Report 2	K. Marmor 22'; M. Truusalu 35'

Beach Arena del Faro di Jesolo, Jesolo
11 September 2014
17:45

Italy	5–3 (a.e.t.)	Poland
S. Marinai 12'; D. Ramacciotti 14'; G. Gori 16'; A. Frainetti 38' (pen.); P. Palmacci 39' (pen.)	Report 1 Report 2	B. Saganowski 5'; P. Frishkemut 21'; W. Ziober 35'

Beach Arena del Faro di Jesolo, Jesolo

12 September 2014
12:45

Poland	5–6	Estonia
B. Saganowski 19', 26', 35'; W. Ziober 32'; T. Wydmuszek 33'	Report 1 Report 2	K. Marmor 15', 24', 31', 35'; T. Tammo 32'; A. Saharov 36'

Beach Arena del Faro di Jesolo, Jesolo
12 September 2014
17:45

Italy	4–2	Belarus
E. Zurlo 7' (pen.); G. Gori 21' (pen.), 32'; M. Marrucci 33'	Report 1 Report 2	A. Karpov 11'; I. Brishtel 29'

Beach Arena del Faro di Jesolo, Jesolo

=== Group 2 ===
Team	Pld	WR	WE	WP	L	GF	GA	GD	Pts
Spain	3	2	0	1	0	17	13	+4	7
Ukraine	3	2	0	0	1	17	11	+6	6
Turkey	3	1	0	0	2	9	13	−4	3
France	3	0	0	0	3	6	12	−6	0

10 September 2014
12:45

Ukraine	5–1	France
O. Budzko 8', 36'; K. Andreev 9'; O. Zborowski 16'; A. Borsuk 18'	Report 1 Report 2	M. Pagis 36'

Beach Arena del Faro di Jesolo, Jesolo
10 September 2014
15:15

Turkey	3–6	Spain
C. Keskin 10'; E. Anzaflioglu 14'; A. Muftuoglu 30'	Report 1 Report 2	Antonio 2', 35'; R. Merida 4'; Llorenç 7'; Kuman 10'; Pajon 14'

Beach Arena del Faro di Jesolo, Jesolo

11 September 2014
10:15

Ukraine	6–4	Turkey
A. Korniichuk 17'; I. Borsuk 21'; R. Pachev 23', 24'; O. Zborowski 27', 29'	Report 1 Report 2	B. Terzioglu 13'; F. Ergun 21'; C. Keskin 29'; A. Muftuoglu 35'

Beach Arena del Faro di Jesolo, Jesolo
11 September 2014
15:15

Spain	5–4	France
Kuman 11'; Antonio 16'; R. Merida 19'; Chiky 19'; Llorenç 34'	Report 1 Report 2	D. Samoun 11' (pen.), 14'; S. Sansoni 16'; J. Basquaise 17'

Beach Arena del Faro di Jesolo, Jesolo

12 September 2014
10:15

France	1–2	Turkey
A. Barbotti 14'	Report 1 Report 2	C. Keskin 8'; B. Terzioglu 35'

Beach Arena del Faro di Jesolo, Jesolo
12 September 2014
15:15

Spain	6–6 (a.e.t.)	Ukraine
Pajon 2'; R. Merida 6'; Llorenç 16' (pen.), 27', 34'; Juanma 24'	Report 1 Report 2	R. Pachev 1', 19'; I. Borsuk 2', 5'; O. Zborowski 10'; A. Borsuk 20'
Penalties
Llorenç (penalty missed); Juanma (penalty scored); Antonio (penalty scored); Chiky (penalty scored); R. Merida (penalty scored)	4–3	(penalty scored) A. Korniichuk; (penalty scored) K. Andreev; (penalty missed) I. Borsuk; (penalty scored) V. Panteleiciuc; (penalty missed) R. Pachev

Beach Arena del Faro di Jesolo, Jesolo

=== Group 3 ===
Team	Pld	WR	WE	WP	L	GF	GA	GD	Pts
Russia	3	3	0	0	0	10	2	+8	9
Romania	3	1	0	1	1	12	12	0	4
Germany	3	1	0	0	2	9	7	+2	3
Greece	3	0	0	0	3	6	16	−10	0

10 September 2014
11:30

Romania	3–3 (a.e.t.)	Germany
G. Dobre 8', 22'; P. Posteuca 14'	Report 1 Report 2	A. Lobsch 6'; C. Thurk 7'; O. Romrig 24'
Penalties
M. Machuca (penalty scored); G. Dobre (penalty scored)	2–0	(penalty missed) S. Weirauch; (penalty missed) O. Romrig

Beach Arena del Faro di Jesolo, Jesolo
10 September 2014
16:30

Greece	0–3	Russia
	Report 1 Report 2	A. Shkarin 1'; K. Romanov 11'; A. Peremitin 16'

Beach Arena del Faro di Jesolo, Jesolo

11 September 2014
11:30

Romania	7–4	Greece
M. Machuca 3', 15', 30', 33', 36'; P. Posteuca 5'; G. Dobre 9'	Report 1 Report 2	P. Gkritzatis 20'; T. Triantafyllidis 25'; K. Papastathopoulos 30'; K. Karampas 36'

Beach Arena del Faro di Jesolo, Jesolo
11 September 2014
16:30

Russia	2–0	Germany
Y. Gorchinskii 3'; A. Makarov 11'	Report 1 Report 2

Beach Arena del Faro di Jesolo, Jesolo

12 September 2014
11:30

Germany	6–2	Greece
C. Biermann 4', 11', 12', 34'; R. Bullerjahn 16'; S. Noemann 21'	Report 1 Report 2	P. Konstantakopoulos 22', 35'

Beach Arena del Faro di Jesolo, Jesolo
12 September 2014
16:30

Russia	5–2	Romania
I. Leonov 1'; K. Romanov 4'; Y. Krasheninnikov 24', 26'; D. Shishin 27'	Report 1 Report 2	P. Posteuca 24'; I. Florea 25'

Beach Arena del Faro di Jesolo, Jesolo

=== Group 4 ===
Team	Pld	WR	WE	WP	L	GF	GA	GD	Pts
Switzerland	3	3	0	0	0	18	8	+10	9
Hungary	3	1	1	0	1	12	11	+1	5
England	3	0	1	0	2	10	17	−7	2
Azerbaijan	3	0	0	0	3	9	13	−4	0

10 September 2014
09:00

England	5–4 (a.e.t.)	Azerbaijan
M. Day 11'; A. Clarke 28', 33', 36' (pen.); M. Corbett 37'	Report 1 Report 2	S. Allahgulu 23', 25', 32'; A. Nazarov 27'

Beach Arena del Faro di Jesolo, Jesolo
10 September 2014
14:00

Hungary	3–6	Switzerland
V. Fekete 15', 19'; M. Ughy 24'	Report 1 Report 2	M. Jaeggy 4', 15', 23'; N. Ott 11'; D. Stankovic 14', 27'

Beach Arena del Faro di Jesolo, Jesolo

11 September 2014
09:00

England	2–5	Hungary
P. Farquharson 10'; M. Corbett 10'	Report 1 Report 2	V. Fekete 10', 28'; F. Imps 21'; P. Jaksa 21'; M. Ughy 31'

Beach Arena del Faro di Jesolo, Jesolo
11 September 2014
14:00

Switzerland	4–2	Azerbaijan
D. Stankovic 2', 15'; P. Borer 5'; N. Ott 18'	Report 1 Report 2	H. Bagirov 13'; O. Mamedov 31'

Beach Arena del Faro di Jesolo, Jesolo

12 September 2014
09:00

Azerbaijan	3–4 (a.e.t.)	Hungary
R. Sultanov 16'; A. Huseynov 25'; F. Imps 36' (o.g.)	Report 1 Report 2	V. Fekete 26'; M. Ughy 28'; L. Berkes 36'; F. Imps 39'

Beach Arena del Faro di Jesolo, Jesolo
12 September 2014
14:00

Switzerland	8–3	England
D. Stankovic 4' (pen.), 19', 19'; S. Spaccarotella 4', 13', 34'; S. Leu 15'; A. Shirintsi 29'	Report 1 Report 2	J. Morris 3'; S. Lawson 4'; M. Day 19'

Beach Arena del Faro di Jesolo, Jesolo

== Final stage ==
The top team from each group in the second stage advance to the semi-finals to play for the title. The other teams eliminated from the second stage advance to classification play-offs (5th to 8th place, 9th to 12th place, 13th to 16th place) depending on their positions.

=== Play-offs for 13th to 16th place ===
==== Semi-finals for 13th to 16th place ====
13 September 2014
09:00

France	5–4	Poland
A. Barbotti 8', 30'; D. Samoun 22'; C. Lauthe 24'; T. Wydmuszek 30' (o.g.)	Report 1 Report 2	W. Ziober 7', 29', 29'; B. Saganowski 31'

Beach Arena del Faro di Jesolo, Jesolo
13 September 2014
10:15

Azerbaijan	6–3	Greece
Z. Zeynalov 1'; S. Allahgulu 13', 28', 35' (pen.); A. Nazarov 26'; O. Mamedov 32' (pen.)	Report 1 Report 2	P. Gkritzalis 22'; K. Papastathopoulos 26'; A. Papaefstratiou 35'

Beach Arena del Faro di Jesolo, Jesolo

==== Play-off for 15th place ====
14 September 2014
09:00

Poland	3–2	Greece
B. Piechnik 32'; P. Taraszkowski 33'; W. Ziober 34'	Report 1 Report 2	P. Konstantakopoulos 34', 35'

Beach Arena del Faro di Jesolo, Jesolo

==== Play-off for 13th place ====
14 September 2014
10:15

France	1–3	Azerbaijan
M. Pagis 5'	Report 1 Report 2	S. Allahgulu 3'; A. Zeynalov 11'; H. Bagirov 31'

Beach Arena del Faro di Jesolo, Jesolo

=== Play-offs for 9th to 12th place ===
==== Semi-finals for 9th to 12th place ====
13 September 2014
11:30

Turkey	5–3	Estonia
B. Terzioglu 3', 10' (pen.), 23'; A. Muftuoglu 16'; A. Suel Seyit 28'	Report 1 Report 2	P. Maerog 1'; M. Truusalu 9'; A. Sosi 26'

Beach Arena del Faro di Jesolo, Jesolo
13 September 2014
12:45

Germany	5–2	England
K. Sousa da Silva 4', 25'; S. Weirauch 12'; A. Kniller 24'; O. Romrig 33'	Report 1 Report 2	A. Clarke 3'; M. Corbett 4'

Beach Arena del Faro di Jesolo, Jesolo

==== Play-off for 11th place ====
14 September 2014
11:30

Estonia	1–1 (a.e.t.)	England
L. Kuuse 14' (pen.)	Report 1 Report 2	J. Temple 16'
Penalties
M. Truusalu (penalty scored); T. Tammo (penalty scored)	2–0	(penalty missed) M. Day; (penalty missed) J. Temple

Beach Arena del Faro di Jesolo, Jesolo

==== Play-off for 9th place ====
14 September 2014
12:45

Turkey	5–4	Germany
B. Terzioglu 10', 12'; E. Anzaflioglu 24'; C. Keskin 28'; A. Muftuoglu 31'	Report 1 Report 2	C. Biermann 11'; O. Romrig 14' (pen.); S. Weirauch 26', 36'

Beach Arena del Faro di Jesolo, Jesolo

=== Play-offs for 5th to 8th place ===
==== Semi-finals for 5th to 8th place ====
13 September 2014
14:00

Hungary	1–4	Belarus
V. Fekete 7'	Report 1 Report 2	O. Slautin 11'; I. Brishtel 14', 21', 26'

Beach Arena del Faro di Jesolo, Jesolo
13 September 2014
15:15

Ukraine	9–7	Romania
D. Medved 9'; V. Panteleiciuc 10'; O. Zborowski 13' (pen.), 14', 22', 22'; V. Farcas 19' (o.g.); R. Pachev 23', 36'	Report 1 Report 2	M. Machuca 1', 11', 19', 22'; R. Carauleanu 7', 35'; D. Zaharia 12'

Beach Arena del Faro di Jesolo, Jesolo

==== Play-off for 7th place ====
14 September 2014
14:00

Hungary	15–7	Romania
M. Ughy 2', 3', 7', 22', 23'; S. Badalik 3', 20'; F. Imps 6', 24', 30', 36'; V. Turos 28', 35'; P. Posteuca 33' (o.g.); L. Berkes 36'	Report 1 Report 2	M. Machuca 5', 8', 30'; I. Florea 13', 36'; P. Posteuca 28'; V. Farcas 35'

Beach Arena del Faro di Jesolo, Jesolo

==== Play-off for 5th place ====
14 September 2014
15:15

Ukraine	2–2 (a.e.t.)	Belarus
A. Korniichuk 13'; O. Zborowski 27'	Report 1 Report 2	I. Brishtel 7', 32' (pen.)
Penalties
A. Korniichuk (penalty missed); K. Andreev (penalty scored)	1–3	(penalty scored) I. Brishtel; (penalty scored) I. Konstantinov; (penalty scored) V. Bokach

Beach Arena del Faro di Jesolo, Jesolo

=== Play-offs for 1st to 4th place ===
==== Semi-finals ====
13 September 2014
16:30

Switzerland	5–4 (a.e.t.)	Spain
D. Stankovic 8', 34'; S. Spaccarotella 17'; A. Shirintsi 27'; S. Leu 38'	Report 1 Report 2	Juanma 2'; Antonio 3'; M. Jaeggy 15' (o.g.); Llorenç 36'

Beach Arena del Faro di Jesolo, Jesolo
13 September 2014
17:45

Russia	5–3	Italy
D. Shishin 13'; A. Frainetti 20' (o.g.); Y. Krasheninnikov 24', 29'; A. Peremitin 27'	Report 1 Report 2	G. Gori 2', 7'; M. Marrucci 29'

Beach Arena del Faro di Jesolo, Jesolo

==== Play-off for 3rd place ====
14 September 2014
16:30

Spain	4–5	Italy
Antonio 2'; Ezequiel 12'; Llorenç 24'; Kuman 33'	Report 1 Report 2	E. Zurlo 1'; D. Ramacciotti 3', 36'; P. Palmacci 17'; F. Corosiniti 35'

Beach Arena del Faro di Jesolo, Jesolo

==== Final ====
14 September 2014
17:45

Switzerland	5–6	Russia
M. Jaeggy 20', 30'; P. Borer 29'; D. Stankovic 31', 35'	Report 1 Report 2	A. Krutikov 8'; M. Chuzhkov 8'; A. Makarov 16', 23'; A. Peremitin 16'; D. Shishin 35'

Beach Arena del Faro di Jesolo, Jesolo

== Final ranking ==
Qualified for 2015 FIFA Beach Soccer World Cup

Rank	Team
1st place, gold medalist(s)	Russia
2nd place, silver medalist(s)	Switzerland
3rd place, bronze medalist(s)	Italy
4	Spain
5	Belarus
6	Ukraine
7	Hungary
8	Romania
9	Turkey
10	Germany
11	Estonia
12	England
13	Azerbaijan
14	France
15	Poland
16	Greece
17	Austria
17	Bulgaria
17	Czech Republic
17	Latvia
17	Moldova
17	Norway
17	Slovakia
