= Bulgaria national beach soccer team =

National sports team

Bulgaria
- Nickname: Лъвовете (The Lions)
- Association: Bulgarian Football Union
- Confederation: UEFA (Europe)
- Head coach: Simeon Hristov
- Captain: Kaloyan Tsvetkov
- Most caps: Ivan Martinov (26)
- Top scorer: Filip Filipov (32)
- FIFA code: BUL
- BSWW ranking: NR (1 June 2026)
First colours	Second colours

Biggest win
- Andorra 1–10 Bulgaria (Nazaré, Portugal; 6 June 2018)

Biggest defeat
- Bulgaria 1–8 Spain (Jesolo, Italy; 5 September 2014)

The Bulgaria national beach soccer team represents Bulgaria in international beach soccer competitions and is controlled by the BFU, the governing body for football in Bulgaria.

== Current squad ==
Correct as of July 2019

Note: Flags indicate national team as defined under FIFA eligibility rules; some limited exceptions apply. Players may hold more than one non-FIFA nationality.

No.	Pos.	Nation	Player
6	DF		Stanislav Dzhambazov
7	DF		Georgi Dimitrov
8	MF		Kaloyan Tsvetkov (captain)
9	MF		Filip Filipov

No.	Pos.	Nation	Player
11	FW		Pavel Adamov
12	GK		Dobromir Gospodinov
14	DF		Ilian Iliev
16	GK		Stanislav Ivanov
18	DF		Kristian Todorov
22	FW		Ivan Martinov

Coach: Simeon Hristov

== Achievements ==
- Euro Beach Soccer League Division B
  - 2013 The Hague, Netherlands, 19–21 July : Third place
  - 2014 Siófok, 8–10 August: Runner up
  - 2014 Promotional Final Torredembarra, 14–17 August : 7th place
  - 2016 Siófok, 12–14 August : Third place
  - 2017 Siófok, 11–13 August : Runner up
  - 2017 Promotional Final Terracina, 14–17 September : 6th place
  - 2018 Nazaré, 6–8 July : WINNER
  - 2018 Promotional Final Alghero, 6–9 September : Third place
  - 2019 Nazaré, 5–7 July : Runner up
  - 2019 Promotional Final Figueira da Foz, 5–8 September : withdrew
- FIFA Beach Soccer World Cup qualification (UEFA) Best: Group Stage
  - 2009
  - 2011
  - 2012
  - 2014
  - 2016
