= Poland national beach soccer team =

Poland
- Nickname(s): Biało-czerwoni ("The white and reds")
- Association: Polish Football Association
- Confederation: UEFA (Europe)
- Head coach: Marcin Stanisławski
- Captain: Witold Ziober
- Most caps: Paweł Friszkemut (75)
- Top scorer: Bogusław Saganowski (68)
- FIFA code: POL
- BSWW ranking: 24 ▲2 (1 June 2026)
First colours
Second colours

First international
- Poland 6–4 Norway (Chodecz, Poland; 2 August 2003)

Biggest win
- Poland 13–3 Azerbaijan (Moscow, Russia; 27 July 2019)

Biggest defeat
- Poland 1–11 Portugal (Rome, Italy; 23 May 2009)

The Poland national beach soccer team represents Poland in international beach soccer competitions and is controlled by the PZPN, the governing body for beach soccer in Poland.

== Competitive record ==
=== FIFA Beach Soccer World Cup Qualification (UEFA) ===
FIFA Beach Soccer World Cup Qualification Record
Year	Result	Pld	W	WE	WP	L	GS	GA	Dif	Pts
(Spain) 2008	Round of 16	4	2	0	0	2	14	11	+3	6
(Spain) 2009	Round of 16	4	3	0	0	1	16	11	+5	9
(Italy) 2011	Quarterfinals	5	3	0	0	2	27	18	+9	9
(Russia) 2013	Playoff Stage	7	4	1	0	2	36	26	+10	13
(Italy) 2015	Playoff Stage	8	3	0	0	5	29	37	-8	9
(Italy) 2017	Champions	8	6	1	0	1	33	20	+13	20
(Russia) 2019	7th Place	8	4	1	0	3	31	27	+4	14
(Portugal) 2021	10th Place	5	3	0	0	2	23	24	-1	9
(Azerbaijan) 2023	11th Place	5	2	0	0	3	19	19	0	6
Total	8/10	54	30	3	0	21	228	193	+35	95

== Current squad ==
Note: Flags indicate national team as defined under FIFA eligibility rules; some limited exceptions apply. Players may hold more than one non-FIFA nationality.

No.	Pos.	Nation	Player
1	GK		Patryk Sobczak
2	DF		Filip Gac
3	DF		Maciej Daniluk
4	FW		Konrad Kubiak
6	DF		Artur Popławski
9	MF		Karim Madani

No.	Pos.	Nation	Player
10	MF		Daniel Baran
11	FW		Piotr Klepczarek
13	MF		Paweł Friszkemut
14	DF		Jakub Jesionowski
15	FW		Tomasz Poźniak
20	FW		Kamil Szloser
12	GK		Maciej Marciniak (captain)

Coach: Marcin Stanisławski

== Achievements ==
- Euro Beach Soccer League Best: Third Place
  - 2006
- FIFA Beach Soccer World Cup Best: 11th place
  - 2006
- FIFA World Cup qualification tournament Best: Champions
  - 2017
