= Germany national beach soccer team =

Germany
- Nickname: Die Nationalmannschaft (the national team)
- Association: German Football Association
- Confederation: UEFA (Europe)
- Head coach: Matteo Marrucci
- Captain: Sascha Weirauch
- Most caps: Sascha Weirauch (70)
- Top scorer: Christian Biermann (56)
- Home stadium: O2 World, Berlin
- FIFA code: GER
- BSWW ranking: 26 ▲3 (2 September 2026)
First colours
Second colours

First international
- United States 5–1 Germany (Rio de Janeiro, Brazil; 24 January 1995)

Biggest win
- Germany 11–3 Netherlands (Osnabrück, Germany; 2 August 2015)

Biggest defeat
- Brazil 14–0 Germany (Alanya, Turkey; 15 July 2000); Brazil 14–0 Germany (Figueira da Foz, Portugal; 20 July 2000)

World Cup
- Appearances: 4 (first in 1995)
- Best result: 5th place, 1995

Euro Beach Soccer League
- Appearances: 15 (first in 1998)
- Best result: Champions, (1998)

Euro Beach Soccer Cup
- Appearances: 5 (first in 1999)
- Best result: 4th place (1998), (2001), (2003)

The German beach soccer team represents Germany in international beach soccer competitions and is controlled by the G.F.A, the governing body for football in Germany.

== Competitive record ==
=== FIFA Beach Soccer World Cup Qualification (UEFA) ===
FIFA Beach Soccer World Cup Qualification Record
Year	Result	Pld	W	WE	WP	L	GS	GA	Dif	Pts
(Spain) 2008	Round of 16	4	2	0	0	2	15	14	+1	6
(Spain) 2009	Group Stage	3	1	0	0	2	14	16	-2	3
(Italy) 2011	Group Stage	2	0	0	0	2	5	11	-6	0
(Russia) 2013	Group Stage	3	1	0	0	2	4	9	-5	3
(Italy) 2015	10th Place	8	4	0	0	4	28	21	+7	12
(Italy) 2017	12th Place	8	2	1	0	5	27	29	-2	8
(Russia) 2019	Round of 16	4	1	0	0	3	11	15	-4	3
(Portugal) 2021	6th Place	5	3	0	0	3	29	12	+11	6
(Azerbaijan) 2023	12th Place	5	1	0	1	3	27	27	0	3
(Spain) 2025	Round of 16	4	1	0	0	3	15	21	-6	3
Total	10/10	41	13	1	1	26	146	163	-17	41

== Current squad ==
Correct as of April 2017

Note: Flags indicate national team as defined under FIFA eligibility rules; some limited exceptions apply. Players may hold more than one non-FIFA nationality.

No.	Pos.	Nation	Player
1	GK		Toni Müller
3	DF		Anton Kniller
5	DF		Tim Engelhardt
7	MF		Christian Biermann
9	MF		Sascha Weirauch

No.	Pos.	Nation	Player
11	FW		Oliver Romrig (captain)
12	GK		Moritz Westkämper
13	FW		Christoph Thürk
15	MF		Tim Schmitt
17	DF		Manuel Mönch
18	MF		Valon Beqiri

Coach: Sebastian Ulrich

== Achievements ==
- Euro Beach Soccer League
  - Winner (1): 1998
