= 2022 Euro Beach Soccer League =

Tournament details
- Host countries: Portugal; Moldova; Italy
- Dates: 1 July – 11 September
- Teams: 22 (from 1 confederation)
- Venues: 3 (in 3 host cities)

Final positions
- Champions: Switzerland (2nd title)
- Runners-up: Portugal
- Third place: Italy
- Fourth place: Spain

Tournament statistics
- Matches played: 59
- Goals scored: 465 (7.88 per match)

Locations of the fixtures of the 2022 Euro Beach Soccer League ( Division A events; Division B events)

The 2022 Euro Beach Soccer League was the 25th edition of the Euro Beach Soccer League (EBSL), the annual, premier competition in European beach soccer contested between men's national teams. It was organised by Beach Soccer Worldwide (BSWW), in a league and play-off format.

This season, the competing teams continued to take part in two divisions: the top tier (Division A) and the bottom tier (Division B). Division A shrunk from 12 to 10 teams; nine teams returned from last season, plus Estonia who were promoted, meanwhile two teams did not compete due to bans. Division B accommodated 12 nations: those who did not gain promotion from last season, two debuting countries (Malta and Latvia), and teams returning after an absence from competing in recent years.

This season's format was altered considerably compared to the usual programme. All teams in Division A played together across five matchdays. The eight best teams advanced to the post-season event, the Superfinal, but only the top four competed for the EBSL title itself. The teams of Division B entered straight into the Promotion Final to try to earn a spot in Division A next year; no team was relegated this year, whilst the top four were guaranteed promotion to Division A, rather than the usual one, because the top tier is being expanded to 16 teams for 2023.

The league also acted as the qualification route to the 2023 European Games; the top six teams of the Superfinal plus the Promotion Final winners qualified to join hosts Poland.

The Promotion Final was won by Moldova who were promoted to Division A for the first time alongside Kazakhstan, whilst Greece and Turkey also earned promotion. Portugal were the three-time defending champions and were looking for a record fourth straight title, but were beaten in the final by Switzerland who claimed their second title, following their maiden crown ten years prior in 2012.

== Division A ==
=== Calendar ===
Phase	Dates	Country	City
Regular season	1–3 July	Portugal	Nazaré
Regular season	8–9 September	Italy	Cagliari
Superfinal	10–11 September	Italy	Cagliari

=== Teams ===
Of the 12 nations who earnt Division A status at the end of last season, 10 entered into this season's top tier as follows (The numbers in parentheses show the European ranking of each team prior to the start of the season, out of 34 nations):

- ~~Russia~~^{[a]} (1st)
- Portugal (2nd)
- Spain (3rd)
- Switzerland (4th)
- Italy (5th)
- ~~Belarus~~^{[b]} (6th)
- Ukraine (7th)
- Germany (8th)
- France (9th)
- Azerbaijan (10th)
- Poland (12th)
- Estonia^{[P]} (15th)

a: In accordance with sanctions imposed by FIFA and UEFA in response to the 2022 Russian invasion of Ukraine, the Russian national team was banned from entering.
b: Did not enter; reported by media as excluded due to Belarus' role in the 2022 Russian invasion of Ukraine.
P: Promoted from Division B at the end of the 2021 season.

=== Regular season ===
Key: Advance to –	Superfinal semi-finals /	Superfinal 5th to 8th place /	Superfinal 9th place match /	(H) Hosts

==== Group 1 ====
Pos	Team	Pld	W	W+	WP	L	GF	GA	GD	Pts
1	Spain	4	4	0	0	0	22	9	+13	12
2	Italy (H)	4	3	0	0	1	25	13	+12	9
3	Ukraine	4	2	0	0	2	9	12	–3	6
4	Azerbaijan	4	1	0	0	3	14	20	–6	3
5	Germany	4	0	0	0	4	11	27	–16	0

1 July 2022	Spain	8–1	Germany	Estádio do Viveiro, Nazaré
11:15 (UTC+1)	Chiky 4', 12'; Domi 8' (pen.); Cassano 20', 27', 31'; Suárez 22'; Paredes 23'	Report	17' (pen.) Lüth	Referee: Vitalij Gomolko (Lithuania)

1 July 2022	Italy	7–3	Azerbaijan	Estádio do Viveiro, Nazaré
15:15 (UTC+1)	Gori 1' (pen.); Casapieri 11'; Zurlo 19', 30'; Bertacca 32', 33'; Sanfilippo 36'	Report	9' K. Huseynov; 23' Mammadov; 36' Mehtiyev	Referee: Sergio Gomes (Portugal)

2 July 2022	Germany	5–6	Azerbaijan	Estádio do Viveiro, Nazaré
12:30 (UTC+1)	Romrig 1', 3'; Metzler 26', 26'; Lüth 30'	Report	4' Nazarov; 10', 28' Akhundov; 14' Gazamov; 26' Elshad; 29' Mammadov	Referee: Tomasz Winiarczyk (Poland)

2 July 2022	Spain	4–1	Ukraine	Estádio do Viveiro, Nazaré
16:30 (UTC+1)	Suárez 10', 16'; Chiky 17'; Antonio 31'	Report	16' Scherytsia	Referee: Csaba Baghy (Hungary)

3 July 2022	Spain	6–4	Azerbaijan	Estádio do Viveiro, Nazaré
12:30 (UTC+1)	Arias 12'; Antonio 12', 24'; Nazarov 23' (o.g.); Domi 24' (pen.); Suárez 34'	Report	12' Mammadov; 28' Mehtiyev; 29' Jomard; 32' Allaghulyev	Referee: Francisco Costa (Portugal)

3 July 2022	Italy	5–3	Ukraine	Estádio do Viveiro, Nazaré
16:30 (UTC+1)	Zurlo 8'; Gori 19', 28'; Giordani 34'; Genovali 36'	Report	11' Nerush; 25' Scherytsia; 33' A. Borsuk	Referee: Lukasz Ostrowski (Poland)

8 September 2022	Ukraine	2–1	Azerbaijan	Palm Beach, Cagliari
13:30 (UTC+2)	Nerush 11'; Glutskyi 14'	Report	28' Ramil	Referee: Sergio Gomes (Portugal)

8 September 2022	Italy	10–3	Germany	Palm Beach, Cagliari
17:30 (UTC+2)	Josep Jr. 3'; Giordani 8', 13'; Gori 13', 15', 19', 20', 36'; Sciacca 31'; Remedi 32'	Report	10' Metzler; 20' Nowak; 36' Hoeveler	Referee: Eduards Borisevics (Latvia)

9 September 2022	Ukraine	3–2	Germany	Palm Beach, Cagliari
(UTC+2)	Zborovskyi 11'; Medvid 14'; Voitenko 34'	Report	19' (o.g.) A. Borsuk; 36' Nowak	Referee: Saverio Bottalico (Italy)

9 September 2022	Italy	3–4	Spain	Palm Beach, Cagliari
17:30 (UTC+2)	Fazzini 9'; Miceli 19'; Zurlo 34'	Report	2' Dona; 16' Domingo; 19' Chiky; 30' David	Referee: Lukasz Ostrowski (Poland)

==== Group 2 ====
Pos	Team	Pld	W	W+	WP	L	GF	GA	GD	Pts
1	Portugal (H)	4	4	0	0	0	26	9	+17	12
2	Switzerland	4	3	0	0	1	24	13	+11	9
3	Poland	4	1	1	0	2	16	17	–1	5
4	France	4	1	0	0	3	14	24	–10	3
5	Estonia	4	0	0	0	4	9	26	–17	0

1 July 2022	France	2–8	Switzerland	Estádio do Viveiro, Nazaré
13:45 (UTC+1)	Barbotti 1'; Gosselin 35'	Report	16', 29' Stankovic; 22' Ott; 27' Borer; 30' Wandji; 31' Spacca; 34' Eliott; 34' Hodel	Referee: Luca Romani (Italy)

1 July 2022	Portugal	8–1	Estonia	Estádio do Viveiro, Nazaré
17:45 (UTC+1)	Léo Martins 15', 22', 28'; Bê Martins 17'; Lourenço 25', 26'; Pintado 28' (pen.), 36'	Report	1' Nõmmiko	Referee: Csaba Baghy (Hungary)

2 July 2022	Estonia	2–7	Poland	Estádio do Viveiro, Nazaré
15:00 (UTC+1)	Lepik 1', 32'	Report	2', 7', 23', 34' Petrasiak; 5', 12' Ziober; 27' Witkowski	Referee: Francisco Bumedien (Spain)

2 July 2022	Portugal	8–2	France	Estádio do Viveiro, Nazaré
19:00 (UTC+1)	Coimbra 14'; Lourenço 15'; Léo Martins 14', 16', 33'; Algarvio 18'; Bê Martins 26'; Belchior 30'	Report	14' Barbotti; 33' (o.g.) Algarvio	Referee: Vitalij Gomolko (Lithuania)

3 July 2022	Poland	5–4 (a.e.t.)	France	Estádio do Viveiro, Nazaré
15:00 (UTC+1)	Gac 17'; Pietrasiak 20', 24', 39'; Karolak 29'	Report	7', 28', 28' Varrel; 23' Basquaise	Referee: Vasileios Fitsas (Greece)

3 July 2022	Portugal	6–4	Switzerland	Estádio do Viveiro, Nazaré
19:00 (UTC+1)	Léo Martins 14', 22', 30'; Bê Martins 34', 35' (pen.), 36'	Report	4', 22' (pen.), 24' Hodel; 24' Steinmann	Referee: Csaba Baghy (Hungary)

8 September 2022	Switzerland	5–3	Estonia	Palm Beach, Cagliari
11:00 (UTC+2)	W.Tchatat 6'; Ott 9', 23'; Stankovic 22', 32'	Report	19' Lepik; 29' Er. Stüf; 30' Mäeorg	Referee: Francisco de Oses Bumedien (Spain)

8 September 2022	Portugal	4–2	Poland	Palm Beach, Cagliari
15:00 (UTC+2)	Bê Martins 20', 32'; M. Pintado 24'; Belchior 25'	Report	13' Pietrasiak; 18' Bistuła	Referee: Luca Romani (Italy)

9 September 2022	France	6–3	Estonia	Palm Beach, Cagliari
11:00 (UTC+2)	Barbotti 7', 28', 30'; Bru 7', 33'; Basquaise 23'	Report	2', 36' Lepik; 23' Er. Stüf	Referee: Moreno Longo (Italy)

9 September 2022	Switzerland	7–2	Poland	Palm Beach, Cagliari
15:00 (UTC+2)	Eliott 7'; Spacca 10', 14'; Ott 12'; Hodel 17'; Stankovic 35', 36'	Report	32', 35' Jesionowski	Referee: Vladimir Tashkov (Bulgaria)

==== Awards ====
The following awards were presented after the conclusion of the first round of matches in Nazaré.

Nazaré stage trophy	Top scorer(s)		Best player	Best goalkeeper
Portugal	(Portugal) Léo Martins	9 goals	(Portugal) Léo Martins	(Switzerland) Eliott Mounoud

=== Superfinal ===
==== Consolation ====
===== 9th place match =====
10 September 2022
08:30 (UTC+2)

Estonia	3–1	Germany
Nõmmiko 1'; Er. Stüf 25'; Lepik 26'	Report	25' Olli

Palm Beach, Cagliari
Referee: Luca Romani (Italy)

===== 5th–8th place =====
5th–8th place semi-finals
10 September
Ukraine	10
France	5
10 September
Poland	2
Azerbaijan	6

Fifth place match
11 September
Ukraine	6
Azerbaijan	2
Seventh place match
11 September
France	1
Poland	7

====== 5th–8th place semi-finals ======
10 September 2022
11:00 (UTC+2)

Ukraine	10–5	France
Medvid 5', 33'; Nerush 12'; Glutskyi 16'; Voitenko 18', 24', 26'; Pashko 20'; Shcherytsia 27'	Report	15' Bru; 20' Guerin; 24', 31' Gosselin; 26' Barbotti; 28' S. Dias

Palm Beach, Cagliari
Referee: Sergio Gomes (Portugal)
10 September 2022
12:15 (UTC+2)

Poland	2–6	Azerbaijan
Meloyan 27'; Jesionowski 29'	Report	8' Mammadov; 8' Akhundov; 21' Sabir; 28', 30' Ramil; 31' Nazarov

Palm Beach, Cagliari
Referee: Malte Gerhardt (Germany)

====== Seventh place match ======
11 September 2022
11:00 (UTC+2)

France	1–7	Poland
Barbotti 32'	Report	2', 32' Bistuła; 3' Popławski; 7', 17' Pietrasiak; 9' Witkowski; 31' Gac

Palm Beach, Cagliari
Referee: Vladimir Tashkov (Bulgaria)

====== Fifth place match ======
11 September 2022
12:15 (UTC+2)

Ukraine	6–2	Azerbaijan
Voitenko 9'; I. Borsuk 13'; A. Borsuk 18'; Voitok 25'; Pashko 31'; Kovalenko 36'	Report	18' Zeynalli; 34' (o.g.) Kovalenko

Palm Beach, Cagliari
Referee: Francisco De Oses (Spain)

==== Final four ====
Semi-finals
10 September
Spain	5
Switzerland	8
10 September
Portugal	8
Italy	3

Final
11 September
Switzerland	6
Portugal	5
Third place match
11 September
Spain	2
Italy	3

===== Semi-finals =====
10 September 2022
13:30 (UTC+2)

Spain	5–8	Switzerland
Kuman 16', 27' (pen.), 33'; D. Ardil 21', 31'	Report	10', 12', 32' Eliott; 2', 21', 22' Hodel; 23' Stankovic; 36' Steinmann

Palm Beach, Cagliari
Referee: Saverio Bottalico (Italy)
10 September 2022
17:30 (UTC+2)

Portugal	8–3	Italy
Léo Martins 5', 25', 28'; M. Pintado 19', 31'; Bê Martins 22', 36'; Rui Coimbra 27'	Report	7' Casapieri; 31' Remedi; 35' Gori

Palm Beach, Cagliari
Referee: Vladimir Tashkov (Bulgaria)

===== Third place match =====
11 September 2022
15:00 (UTC+2)

Italy	3–2	Spain
Bertacca 5', 6'; Josep Jr. 33'	Report	5' Chiky; 22' Dona

Palm Beach, Cagliari
Referee: Malte Gerhardt (Germany)

===== Superfinal match =====
11 September 2022
17:30 (UTC+2)

Portugal	5–6	Switzerland
Bê Martins 11', 23'; Lourenço 13'; R. Pinhal 32'; Léo Martins 35'	Report	2', 17', 18' Ott; 10', 36' Stankovic; 23' Hodel

Palm Beach, Cagliari
Referee: Lukasz Ostrowski (Poland)

=== Awards ===
==== Winners trophy ====
2022 Euro Beach Soccer League
champions

Switzerland
Second title

==== Individual awards ====
Top scorer(s)
(Portugal) Léo Martins
13 goals
Best player
(Switzerland) Noël Ott
Best goalkeeper
(Portugal) Elinton Andrade

=== Final standings ===
Key:
Qualified to 2023 European Games
Qualified to 2023 European Games automatically as host nation of the Games

Pos	Team	Result
1	Switzerland	EBSL Champions (2nd title)
2	Portugal	Runners-up
3	Italy	Third place
4	Spain	
5	Ukraine	
6	Azerbaijan	
7	Poland	
8	France	
9	Estonia	
10	Germany	

=== Top scorers ===
The following table lists the top 10 scorers in Division A, including goals scored across both the regular season and post season matches.

Rank	Player	Goals
1	(Portugal) Léo Martins	13
2	(Portugal) Bê Martins	11
3	(Switzerland) Glenn Hodel	10
3	(Poland) Patryk Pietrasiak	10
5	(Italy) Gabriele Gori	9
5	(Switzerland) Dejan Stankovic	9
7	(France) Anthony Barbotti	6
7	(Estonia) Sander Lepik	6
7	(Switzerland) Noël Ott	6
10	(Portugal) André Lourenço	5
10	(Spain) Chiky Ardil	5
10	(Switzerland) Eliott Mounoud	5
10	(Portugal) Miguel Pintado	5
10	(Ukraine) Dmytro Voitenko	5

Sources: Matchdays 1–3, Matchdays 4–5 and Superfinal

== Division B ==
=== Calendar ===
Phase	Dates	Country	City
Promotion Final	27–31 July	Moldova	Chișinău

=== Teams ===
The following teams entered Division B this season (The numbers in parentheses show the European ranking of each team prior to the start of the season, out of 34 nations):

England returned after a one-season absence. Having originally expressed intentions to compete as far back as 2004, Malta finally made their first appearance in the competition. Czech Republic, Sweden, Bulgaria and Slovakia were also among the preliminary list of participants, but ultimately did not enter; the first did not feature for the first time since their 2007 debut.

- Turkey^{[R]} (11th)
- Kazakhstan (14th)
- Romania (16th)
- Greece (17th)
- Moldova (18th)
- Norway (19th)
- Lithuania (20th)
- England (21st)
- Denmark (23rd)
- Georgia (28th)
- Latvia^{[c]} (29th)
- Malta^{[c]} (n/a)

R: Relegated from Division A at the end of the 2021 season.
c.: Team making their debut.

=== Promotion Final ===
The best four teams earn promotion to Division A for the 2023 season.

Key: Advance to –	Promotion Final semi-finals /	Hosts (H)

==== Group stage ====
===== Group A =====
Pos	Team	Pld	W	W+	WP	L	GF	GA	GD	Pts
1	Moldova (H)	3	3	0	0	0	11	2	+9	9
2	Romania	3	1	0	1	1	8	10	–2	4
3	England	3	1	0	0	2	9	10	–1	3
4	Malta	3	0	0	0	3	7	13	–6	0

27 July 2022	Romania	4–3	England	FMF Beach Soccer Arena
14:30 (UTC+3)	Zaharia; Liviu; Andrescu	Report	Clarke; Grossett; O'Neill

27 July 2022	Malta	1–4	Moldova	FMF Beach Soccer Arena
18:30 (UTC+3)	R. Caruana	Report	Negara; Ignat; Florea; Cojocari

28 July 2022	Romania	4–4 (a.e.t.) (3–1 p)	Malta	FMF Beach Soccer Arena
14:30 (UTC+3)		Report

28 July 2022	Moldova	4–1	England	FMF Beach Soccer Arena
18:30 (UTC+3)		Report

29 July 2022	England	5–2	Malta	FMF Beach Soccer Arena
14:30 (UTC+3)		Report

29 July 2022	Moldova	3–0	Romania	FMF Beach Soccer Arena
18:30 (UTC+3)		Report

===== Group B =====
Pos	Team	Pld	W	W+	WP	L	GF	GA	GD	Pts
1	Turkey	3	2	1	0	0	7	3	+4	8
2	Denmark	3	1	0	0	2	13	6	+7	3
3	Latvia	3	0	1	1	1	8	8	0	3
4	Lithuania	3	0	0	0	3	8	19	–11	0

27 July 2022	Lithuania	3–12	Denmark	FMF Beach Soccer Arena
13:15 (UTC+3)	Makutunovičius; Giedraitis	Report	Damm; Levin; Plytnikas (o.g.); Dorph; Frandsen; Jorgensen; Wegeberg; Rædkjær

27 July 2022	Latvia	2–3	Turkey	FMF Beach Soccer Arena
17:15 (UTC+3)	Skuratovics; Yasin (o.g.)	Report	Semih; Bariș; Ferhat

28 July 2022	Lithuania	4–4 (a.e.t.) (2–4 p)	Latvia	FMF Beach Soccer Arena
13:15 (UTC+3)		Report

28 July 2022	Turkey	1–0 (a.e.t.)	Denmark	FMF Beach Soccer Arena
17:15 (UTC+3)		Report

29 July 2022	Denmark	1–2 (a.e.t.)	Latvia	FMF Beach Soccer Arena
13:15 (UTC+3)		Report

29 July 2022	Turkey	3–1	Lithuania	FMF Beach Soccer Arena
17:15 (UTC+3)		Report

===== Group C =====
Pos	Team	Pld	W	W+	WP	L	GF	GA	GD	Pts
1	Kazakhstan	3	2	0	1	0	16	6	+10	7
2	Greece	3	2	0	0	1	11	4	+7	6
3	Norway	3	1	0	0	2	6	13	–7	3
4	Georgia	3	0	0	0	3	5	15	–10	0

27 July 2022	Kazakhstan	7–3	Norway	FMF Beach Soccer Arena
12:00 (UTC+3)	Tyulpa; Makagon; Muralinov; Azhikenov; Perevyortov; Demeshko; Bogdanov	Report	Demeshko (o.g.); Aano; Li

27 July 2022	Georgia	2–5	Greece	FMF Beach Soccer Arena
16:00 (UTC+3)	Gkritzalis (o.g.); Partenadze	Report	Katsoulis; Tsitsaris; Papastathopoulos

28 July 2022	Kazakhstan	7–1	Georgia	FMF Beach Soccer Arena
12:00 (UTC+3)		Report

28 July 2022	Greece	4–0	Norway	FMF Beach Soccer Arena
16:00 (UTC+3)		Report

29 July 2022	Norway	3–2	Georgia	FMF Beach Soccer Arena
12:00 (UTC+3)		Report

29 July 2022	Greece	2–2 (a.e.t.) (3–4 p)	Kazakhstan	FMF Beach Soccer Arena
16:00 (UTC+3)		Report

==== Play-offs ====
===== 9th–12th place =====
9th–12th place semi-finals
30 July
Malta	5
Georgia	6
30 July
Norway	2
Lithuania	1

Ninth place match
31 July
Georgia	3 (2)
Norway (p)	3 (4)
Eleventh place match
31 July
Malta	4
Lithuania	9

====== 9th–12th place semi-finals ======
30 July 2022
12:00 (UTC+3)

Malta	5–6	Georgia
D. Caruana 17'; Cutajar 20'; R. Caruana 23'; Nanapere 29'; J. Zammit 35'	Report	Lomidze 19'; Partenadze 22'; G. Makharadze 24'; Diakvnishvili 27', 35'; K. H. Makharadze 35'

FMF Beach Soccer Arena
Referee: Cepoi Octavian (Moldova)
30 July 2022
13:15 (UTC+3)

Norway	2–1	Lithuania
Li 20'; Hellman 32'	Report	Makutunovičius 18'

FMF Beach Soccer Arena
Referee: Dmytro Dudka (Ukraine)

====== Eleventh place match ======
31 July 2022
12:00 (UTC+3)

Malta	4–9	Lithuania
J. Zammit 23', 24'; Nanapere 31'; Cutajar 32'	Report	Plytnikas 6', 24'; Navickas 11', 19'; Giedraitis 14'; Makutunovičius 15', 22', 35'; Lebedevas 28'

FMF Beach Soccer Arena
Referee: Rick Bruijn-Rodrigo (Netherlands)

====== Ninth place match ======
31 July 2022
13:15 (UTC+3)

Georgia	3–3 (a.e.t.)	Norway
Partenadze 1'; G. Makharadze 3', 26'	Report	Gaare 8'; Dyngeland 33'; Bidro 36'
Penalties
	2–4

FMF Beach Soccer Arena
Referee: Andrei Karhu (Estonia)

===== 5th–8th place =====
5th–8th place semi-finals
30 July
Latvia	3
Denmark	1
30 July
Romania	7
England	5

Fifth place match
31 July
Latvia	2
Romania (a.e.t.)	3
Seventh place match
31 July
Denmark	3
England	2

====== 5th–8th place semi-finals ======
30 July 2022
14:30 (UTC+3)

Latvia	3–1	Denmark
Zuburs 6'; Vasiljevs 23', 30'	Report	Madsen 29'

FMF Beach Soccer Arena
Referee: Piotr Stoianov (Moldova)
30 July 2022
16:00 (UTC+3)

Romania	7–5	England
Alexandru 3'; Boata 6', 12'; Enis 11'; Ravoiu 18'; Dumitrica 28'; Andrei 35'	Report	Day 8'; Lawson 9', 14', 25'; Grossett 19'

FMF Beach Soccer Arena
Referee: Ozcan Sultanoglu (Turkey)

====== Seventh place match ======
31 July 2022
14:30 (UTC+3)

Denmark	3–2	England
Wegeberg 15'; Dorph 17'; Rædkjær 33'	Report	Clarke 10', 21'

FMF Beach Soccer Arena
Referee: Attila Balint (Romania)

====== Fifth place match ======
31 July 2022
16:00 (UTC+3)

Latvia	2–3 (a.e.t.)	Romania
Pastars 10'; Jak 20'	Report	Liviu 12'; Boata 34'; Enis 38'

FMF Beach Soccer Arena
Referee: Ingilab Mammadov (Azerbaijan)

===== 1st–4th place =====
Semi-finals
30 July
Turkey	12
Kazakhstan	10
30 July
Moldova	5
Greece	1

Final
31 July
Turkey	3
Moldova	5
Third place match
31 July
Kazakhstan	3
Greece	5

====== Semi-finals ======
30 July 2022
17:15 (UTC+3)

Turkey	12–10	Kazakhstan
Bariş 1', 30', 36'; Keskin 3', 15', 32'; Emrah 10', 24', 34'; Ege 19'; Semih 30'; Efe 31'	Report	Yershin 7', 16', 28'; Tyulpa 19', 22', 34'; Muralinov 28', 36'; Perevyortov 33'; Gulyy 34'

FMF Beach Soccer Arena
Referee: Vladimir Tashkov (Bulgaria)
30 July 2022
18:30 (UTC+3)

Moldova	5–1	Greece
Florea 8', 31'; Borovschi 16'; Turta 28'; Cojocari 33'	Report	Tsitsaris 32'

FMF Beach Soccer Arena
Referee: Ago Kärtmann (Estonia)

====== Third place match ======
31 July 2022
17:15 (UTC+3)

Kazakhstan	3–5	Greece
Muralinov 8'; Yershin 29'; Gulyy 32'	Report	Katsoulis 11', 14'; Tsitsaris 27'; Nikolaou 30'; Triantafyllidis 36'

FMF Beach Soccer Arena
Referee: Oleg Cebotari (Moldova)

====== Final ======
31 July 2022
18:30 (UTC+3)

Turkey	3–5	Moldova
Keskin 24', 36'; Yasin 29'	Report	Negara 3'; Podlesnov 4'; Cojocari 12', 34'; Ignat 20'

FMF Beach Soccer Arena
Referee: Alfredo Pavone (Italy)

==== Awards ====
The following were presented after the conclusion of the final day's matches.

Winners trophy	Top scorer(s)		Best player	Best goalkeeper
Moldova	(Greece) Andreas Katsoulis	8 goals	(Moldova) Grigore Cojocari	(Moldova) Ruslan Istrati

==== Final standings ====
The top four teams were promoted to Division A, rather than the usual one team, because the top tier is being expanded to 16 teams next season.

Winners Moldova and fourth placed Kazakhstan were promoted for the first time. Turkey were immediately promoted back to the top tier having been relegated in 2021. Greece return to Division A for the first time in six years since their relegation in 2017.

By winning the event, Moldova also earned qualification to the men's beach soccer competition at the 2023 European Games in Poland.

Key:
	Qualified to 2023 European Games
■	Ineligible to qualify for 2023 European Games^{[see note]}

Pos	Team	Outcome
1	Moldova	Promoted to 2023 EBSL Division A
2	Turkey	Promoted to 2023 EBSL Division A
3	Greece	Promoted to 2023 EBSL Division A
4	Kazakhstan ■	Promoted to 2023 EBSL Division A
5	Romania	Remain in Division B
6	Latvia	Remain in Division B
7	Denmark	Remain in Division B
8	England	Remain in Division B
9	Norway	Remain in Division B
10	Georgia	Remain in Division B
11	Lithuania	Remain in Division B
12	Malta	Remain in Division B

Kazakhstan were ineligible to qualify to the European Games as they are not a member of the European Olympic Committees. In the event they were to win the Promotion Final, the next highest ranked eligible team would qualify in their place.

=== Top scorers ===
The following table lists the top 10 scorers in Division B.

Rank	Player	Goals
1	(Greece) Andreas Katsoulis	8
2	(Turkey) Cem Keskin	7
2	(Lithuania) Mantas Makutunovičius	7
4	(Turkey) Bariş Terzioglu	6
4	(Moldova) Grigore Cojocari	6
4	(Kazakhstan) Bayanbek Muralinov	6
4	(England) Aaron Clarke	6
8	(Kazakhstan) Vitaliy Tyulpa	5
9	(Kazakhstan) Dmitriy Perevyortov	4
9	(Kazakhstan) Timur Yershin	4
9	(Romania) Herci Liviu-aurelian	4
9	(Georgia (country)) Gocha Makharadze	4
9	(Malta) Dylan Caruana	4

== See also ==
- 2022 Women's Euro Beach Soccer League
