= FIFA Beach Soccer World Cup qualification (UEFA) =

FIFA Beach Soccer World Cup – Europe qualifier
- Organiser(s): BSWW
- Founded: 2008; 18 years ago
- Region: Europe (UEFA)
- Teams: ~25
- Qualifier for: FIFA Beach Soccer; World Cup
- Most championships: Spain (4 titles)
- 2025 UEFA qualifiers

The FIFA Beach Soccer World Cup – Europe qualifier is a beach soccer championship that takes place to determine the nations who will represent Europe at the upcoming edition of the FIFA Beach Soccer World Cup. It is contested between the senior men's national teams of the members of UEFA.

In 2006, FIFA made qualification to the World Cup mandatory (previously, nations were simply invited). Originally, the Euro Beach Soccer League (EBSL) doubled as Europe's qualification tournament; in 2008, this separate championship was created as the European qualification route. FIFA currently allocate Europe five berths at the World Cup and hence the top five teams qualify to the World Cup finals.^{[see notes]} Coinciding with the annual staging of the World Cup, the competition took place yearly until 2010; the World Cup then became biennial, and as its supplementary qualification event, the championship followed suit.

Beach Soccer Worldwide (BSWW) have organised the event since its inception. Europe's governing body for football, UEFA, only began involvement in 2019 – sending delegates and financial support. Unlike the World Cup qualifiers for UEFA in football, it is a knockout tournament with a champion crowned. Its large scale and competitiveness are often noted, making it viewed as a major title to win.

Spain are the most successful team with four titles, but Portugal have secured qualification to the World Cup on the most occasions (seven).

== Background ==
In 2006, FIFA declared that for teams to enter the World Cup, they now must qualify (previously, most teams entered by invitation). Qualification tournaments were subsequently established in all continental zones, except for Europe. For European teams, a qualification process had already been implemented for the previous handful of World Cups – the top placed teams of the most recent season of the Euro Beach Soccer League (EBSL) earned qualification to the upcoming edition of the World Cup. Thus, the EBSL continued to double as the qualifying route for European teams.

In 2008, FIFA proclaimed that the next editions of the World Cup would take place in different countries. Until that point, all World Cups had been held in Brazil during summertime of the Southern Hemisphere, months after the conclusion of that year's EBSL season. That year, the World Cup was held in Marseille, France, and during a different time of the year – in July. The usual European qualification route, the EBSL, was not due to conclude until weeks after the World Cup had taken place. This separate knockout tournament, dedicated purely to determining the teams qualifying to the World Cup, was organised instead; free to be placed anywhere in the calendar, it took place in the May. It "made history", becoming the biggest international beach soccer event ever held at the time with 24 participants. It has since returned in all future years as Europe's qualification tournament.

== Results ==
For all tournaments, the top four teams qualified for the FIFA Beach Soccer World Cup (except for 2009 and 2019, when the top five teams qualified).

Year	Location	Final			Third place play-off			Fifth place (Note: Only shown for the years when the fifth-placed team qualified to the World Cup.)
Year	Location	Champions	Score	Runners-up	Third place	Score	Fourth place	Fifth place
2008 details	Benidorm, Spain	Spain	4–3	Portugal	Russia	4–2	Italy	(Note: The fifth placed team did not qualify to the World Cup because France (2008), Italy (2010) and Portugal (2014) claimed the fifth European spot automatically as World Cup hosts. Italy took part in the 2010 qualifiers as FIFA had yet to confirm their automatic qualification at the time. France and Portugal did not take part in the respective 2008 and 2014 events in knowing qualification was already secured.)
2009 details	Castellón, Spain	Spain	4–4 (a.e.t.) (13–12 p.)	Russia	Switzerland	8–6	Portugal	Italy
2010 details	Bibione, Italy	Ukraine	4–2	Portugal	Russia	5–2	Switzerland	
2012 details	Moscow, Russia	Spain	5–3	Russia	Ukraine	3–0	Netherlands	(Note: The fifth placed team did not qualify to the World Cup in 2013. Tahiti had already qualified automatically for the World Cup as its host nation, occupying the sole OFC berth available. With the most berths, UEFA were therefore chosen by FIFA to give one of their slots to Oceania to allow an additional second team from the OFC to compete regionally and qualify to the World Cup.)
2014 details	Jesolo, Italy	Russia	6–5	Switzerland	Italy	5–4	Spain	
2016 details	Jesolo, Italy	Poland	6–3	Switzerland	Portugal	8–3	Italy	(Note: The fifth placed team did not qualify to the World Cup in 2017. The Bahamas had already qualified automatically for the World Cup as its host nation, occupying one of the two CONCACAF berths available. With the most berths, UEFA were therefore chosen by FIFA to give one of their spots to North America to allow two teams from CONCACAF to compete regionally and qualify to the World Cup as normal.)
2019 details	Moscow, Russia	Russia	7–1	Italy	Belarus	6–2	Switzerland	Portugal
2021 details	Nazaré, Portugal	Spain	5–2	Ukraine (Note: As the runners-up, Ukraine originally qualified for the World Cup in 2021. However, the Ukrainian Association of Football subsequently refused to sanction the participation of the team at the World Cup finals in Moscow. It was reported that the decision was made as part of a wider sporting boycott of Russia by Ukrainian authorities due to ongoing tensions between the two states. As the next best-placed team in the qualifiers in fifth place, Switzerland qualified post factum as lucky losers in order to replace Ukraine. Originally, the fifth placed team did not qualify to the 2021 World Cup because Russia claimed the fifth European spot automatically as World Cup hosts; they did not take part in the 2021 event in knowing qualification was already secured.)	Portugal	6–5	Belarus	Switzerland
2023 details	Baku, Azerbaijan	No such placements were determined. / Belarus, / Italy, / Portugal, / Ukraine (Note: Ukraine originally qualified for the World Cup in 2024. However, the Ministry of Youth and Sports of Ukraine subsequently refused to sanction the participation of the team at the World Cup finals in protest at the Belarus national team being allowed to compete, whom it believed should be barred from entering due the country's role in the Russian invasion of Ukraine. As the statistically next best team in the qualifiers, Spain qualified post factum as lucky losers in order to replace Ukraine. Originally, the fifth placed team did not qualify to the 2024 World Cup because the United Arab Emirates had already qualified automatically for the World Cup as its host nation, occupying one of the three AFC berths available. With the most berths, UEFA were therefore chosen by FIFA to give one of their spots to Asia to allow three teams from the AFC to compete regionally and qualify to the World Cup as normal.) / qualified to the World Cup.						Spain
2024 details	Cádiz, Spain	Portugal		Italy	Belarus		Spain	(Note: The fifth placed team did not qualify to the World Cup in 2025. Seychelles had already qualified automatically for the World Cup as its host nation, occupying one of the two CAF berths available. With the most berths, UEFA were therefore chosen by FIFA to give one of their slots to Africa to allow two teams from CAF to compete regionally and qualify to the World Cup as normal.)

== Performance ==
=== Successful nations ===
Team	Titles	Runners-up	Third place	Fourth place	Total top 4
Spain	4 (2008*, 2009*, 2012, 2021)	–	–	2 (2014, 2024*)	6
Russia	2 (2014, 2019*)	2 (2009, 2012*)	2 (2008, 2010)	–	6
Portugal	1 (2024)	2 (2008, 2010)	2 (2016, 2021*)	1 (2009)	7
Ukraine	1 (2010)	1 (2021)	1 (2012)	–	4
Poland	1 (2016)	–	–	–	1
Italy	–	2 (2019, 2024)	1 (2014*)	2 (2008, 2016*)	6
Switzerland	–	2 (2014, 2016)	1 (2009)	2 (2010, 2019)	5
Belarus	–	–	2 (2019, 2024)	1 (2021)	4
Netherlands	–	–	–	1 (2012)	1

* Hosts

=== Awards ===
Year	Top goalscorer(s)	Gls	Best player	Best goalkeeper	Ref.
(Spain) 2008	(Switzerland) Dejan Stankovic	16	(Spain) Amarelle	(Spain) Roberto Valeiro	
(Spain) 2009	(Italy) Pasquale Carotenuto	24	(Russia) Ilya Leonov	(Russia) Andrey Bukhlitskiy	
(Italy) 2010	(Portugal) Madjer	16	(Russia) Ilya Leonov	(Portugal) Paulo Graça	
(Russia) 2012	(Poland) Bogusław Saganowski	15	(Spain) Amarelle	(Ukraine) Vitalii Sydorenko	
(Italy) 2014	(Switzerland) Dejan Stankovic	21	(Italy) Dario Ramacciotti	(Switzerland) Valentin Jaeggy	
(Italy) 2016	(Switzerland) Dejan Stankovic	25	(Poland) Bogusław Saganowski	(Poland) Szymon Gąsiński	
(Russia) 2019	(Italy) Gabriele Gori	14	(Russia) Yury Krasheninnikov	(Russia) Maxim Chuzhkov	
(Portugal) 2021	(Switzerland) Noël Ott (Switzerland) Philip Borer	10	(Spain) Chiky Ardil	(Ukraine) Andreii Nerush	
(Azerbaijan) 2023	(Germany) Oliver Romrig	10	(Belarus) Ihar Bryshtel	(Italy) Leandro Casapieri	
(Spain) 2024	(Spain) Chiky Ardil	12	(Portugal) Jordan Santos	(Portugal) Pedro Mano	

=== All-time top goalscorers ===
As of 2023

The following table shows the all-time goalscorers; players with at least 30 goals are shown.

Source: Match reports.

Rank	Player	Team	Goals
1	Dejan Stankovic	Switzerland	114
2	Madjer	Portugal	65
3	Gabriele Gori	Italy	56
4	Bogusław Saganowski	Poland	55
5	Belchior	Portugal	54
5	Dmitry Shishin	Russia	54
7	Marian Măciucă	Romania	43
8	Noël Ott	Switzerland	39
8	Oleg Zborovskyi	Ukraine	39
10	Ihar Bryshtel	Belarus	38
11	Jérémy Basquaise	France	37
11	Aleksey Makarov	Russia	37
13	Amarelle	Spain	36
14	Christian Biermann	Germany	35
14	Barış Terzioğlu	Turkey	35
16	Llorenç Gómez	Spain	33
17	Paolo Palmacci	Italy	32
18	Alan	Portugal	30
18	Sabir Allahguliyev	Azerbaijan	30
18	Viktor Fekete	Hungary	30
18	Paris Konstantakopoulos	Greece	30

=== All-time table ===
As of 2023

Pos	Team	App	Pld	W	W+	WP	L	GF	GA	GD	Pts	PPG	Win %
1	Spain	9	60	41	3	3	13	335	173	+162	132	2.20	78.3 (47–13)
2	Russia	7	51	42	1	0	8	284	117	+167	128	2.51	84.3 (43–8)
3	Italy	9	54	38	2	3	11	276	162	+114	121	2.24	79.6 (43–11)
4	Portugal	8	51	39	0	2	10	321	135	+186	119	2.33	80.4 (41–10)
5	Switzerland	9	58	37	3	1	17	345	214	+131	118	2.03	70.7 (41–17)
6	Ukraine	8	49	32	2	3	12	226	143	+83	103	2.10	75.5 (37–12)
7	Poland	9	54	29	3	0	22	228	193	+35	93	1.72	59.3 (32–22)
8	Belarus	9	50	24	1	4	21	200	156	+44	78	1.56	58.0 (29–21)
9	France	8	46	22	2	3	19	203	183	+20	73	1.59	58.7 (27–19)
10	Azerbaijan	9	50	17	1	2	30	175	215	−40	55	1.10	40.0 (20–30)
11	Germany	9	43	14	1	1	27	154	158	−4	45	1.05	37.2 (16–27)
12	Hungary	7	39	12	2	3	22	141	168	−27	43	1.10	43.6 (17–22)
13	Romania	7	36	13	1	1	21	138	202	−64	42	1.17	41.7 (15–21)
14	Turkey	8	39	13	0	2	24	148	181	−33	41	1.05	38.5 (15–24)
15	Czech Republic	9	33	13	0	1	19	109	156	−47	40	1.21	42.4 (14–19)
16	Estonia	9	42	10	2	1	29	133	178	−45	35	0.83	31.0 (13–29)
17	Netherlands	5	22	10	0	2	10	73	88	−15	32	1.45	54.5 (12–10)
18	Greece	7	38	9	1	0	28	135	175	−40	29	0.76	26.3 (10–28)
19	Denmark	3	16	8	0	0	8	53	86	−33	24	1.50	50.0 (8–8)
20	England	7	25	6	2	1	16	64	112	−48	23	0.92	36.0 (9–16)
21	Moldova	7	28	6	1	1	20	69	146	−77	21	0.75	28.6 (8–20)
22	Lithuania	5	20	5	0	1	14	45	96	−51	16	0.80	30.0 (6–14)
23	Norway	9	31	4	0	1	26	71	157	−86	13	0.42	16.1 (5–26)
24	Israel	3	11	3	0	0	8	37	48	−11	9	0.82	27.3 (3–8)
25	Austria	4	12	3	0	0	9	42	64	−22	9	0.75	25.0 (3–9)
26	Kazakhstan	4	17	3	0	0	14	39	91	−52	9	0.53	17.6 (3–14)
27	Belgium	1	4	2	0	0	2	19	13	+6	6	1.50	50.0 (2–2)
28	Slovakia	3	9	2	0	0	7	26	61	−35	6	0.67	22.2 (2–7)
29	Sweden	2	6	1	0	0	5	15	20	−5	3	0.50	16.7 (1–5)
30	Latvia	5	16	1	0	0	15	31	94	−63	3	0.19	6.3 (1–15)
31	Malta	1	3	0	0	0	3	4	12	−8	0	0.00	0
32	Serbia	1	3	0	0	0	3	5	25	−20	0	0.00	0
33	Georgia	2	5	0	0	0	5	13	41	−28	0	0.00	0
34	Andorra	3	8	0	0	0	8	16	56	−40	0	0.00	0
35	Bulgaria	5	15	0	0	0	15	31	86	−55	0	0.00	0

Key: Appearances App / Won in normal time W = 3 points / Won in extra-time W+ = 2 points / Won on penalty shoot-out WP = 1 point / Lost L = 0 points / Points per game PPG

=== Appearances & performance timeline ===
The following is a performance timeline of the teams who have appeared in the UEFA qualifiers and how many appearances they each have made.

Legend

- 1st – Champions
- 2nd – Runners-up
- 3rd – Third place
- 4th – Fourth place
- 5th – Fifth place (if qualified to World Cup; regular)
- 5th – Fifth place (if qualified to World Cup; as lucky losers)
- 5th...16th – Fifth to sixteenth place^{[‡]}
- R3 – Qualified to World Cup by winning Round 3 match (no further rounds took place)
- R3 – Round 3 (quarter-finals or 2nd group stage)
- R2 – Round 2 (round of 16)
- R1 – Round 1 (group stage)
- •• – Entered but withdrew
- × – Did not enter
- × – Did not enter (because already qualified to World Cup as hosts)
- ×× – Banned from entering
- – Hosts
- Apps – No. of appearances

‡. In some years, teams knocked-out at rounds 2 or 3 played no further matches (these results are marked as R2 or R3). In other years, classification matches were then played to determine all final placements.

Timeline

Year Team	2008 (Spain) (24)	2009 (Spain) (26)	2010 (Italy) (27)	2012 (Russia) (24)	2014 (Italy) (24)	2016 (Italy) (28)	2019 (Russia) (20)	2021 (Portugal) (21)	2023 (Azerbaijan) (20)	2024 (Spain) (24)	Apps /10
Andorra	R1	R1	R1	×	×	×	×	×	×	×	3
Austria	R1	R1	R1	×	R1	••	×	×	×	×	4
Azerbaijan	R1	8th	R2	R2	13th	8th	8th	8th	13th	R2	10
Belarus	R2	R1	R1	R3	5th	11th	3rd	4th	R3	R3	10
Belgium	×	R2	×	×	×	×	×	×	×	R2	2
Bulgaria	×	R1	R1	R1	R1	R1	×	×	×	×	5
Czech Republic	R3	R1	R1	R2	R1	6th	R1	R1	R1	R1	10
Denmark	×	×	×	×	×	R1	×	13th	R3	R3	4
England	R2	R2	R1	R1	12th	R1	×	R1	×	R2	8
Estonia	R2	R2	R2	R1	11th	R1	R1	14th	10th	R2	10
France	×	6th	R2	R3	14th	7th	R2	9th	R3	R3	9
Georgia	R1	×	×	×	••	R1	×	×	×	R1	3
Germany	R2	R1	R1	R1	10th	12th	R2	6th	12th	R2	10
Greece	R3	R1	R2	R2	16th	14th	×	×	16th	x	7
Hungary	R2	R1	R3	R3	7th	15th	R2	×	×	×	7
Israel	×	R2	R1	R2	×	×	×	×	×	×	3
Italy	4th	5th	R2	R2	3rd	4th	2nd	7th	R3	R3	10
Kazakhstan	×	••	R1	×	×	R1	R2	16th	×	R1	5
Latvia	R1	R1	×	R1	R1	×	R2	×	×	×	5
Lithuania	R1	×	×	×	×	R1	R2	R1	15th	R2	6
Malta	×	×	×	×	×	×	×	×	R1	R1	2
Moldova	×	×	R2	R1	R1	16th	R2	R1	R3	R2	8
Netherlands	R1	R2	R2	4th	×	R1	×	×	×	×	5
Norway	R2	R1	R1	R1	R1	R1	R1	15th	R1	R1	10
Poland	R2	R2	R3	R3	15th	1st	7th	10th	11th	R3	10
Portugal	2nd	4th	2nd	R2	×	3rd	5th	3rd	R3	R3	9
Romania	R1	7th	R3	R1	8th	R1	×	12th	×	••	7
Russia	3rd	2nd	3rd	2nd	1st	5th	1st	×	××	××	7
Serbia	×	×	×	×	×	R1	×	×	×	×	1
Slovakia	R1	••	R1	×	R1	×	×	×	×	×	3
Spain	1st	1st	R3	1st	4th	9th	6th	1st	R3	R3	10
Sweden	×	×	×	×	×	×	×	R1	R1	×	2
Switzerland	R3	3rd	4th	R2	2nd	2nd	4th	5th	14th	R3	10
Turkey	×	R2	R2	R2	9th	13th	R2	11th	9th	••	8
Ukraine	R3	R2	1st	3rd	6th	10th	••	2nd	R3	R2	9

=== Performance of qualifiers at the World Cup ===
The following is a performance timeline of the UEFA teams who have gone on to appear in the World Cup, having qualified from the above events.

Legend

- 1st – Champions
- 2nd – Runners-up
- 3rd – Third place
- 4th – Fourth place
- – Hosts (qualify automatically)
- QF – Quarter-finals
- R1 – Round 1 (group stage)
- •• – Qualified but withdrew
- q – Qualified for upcoming tournament
- Total – Total times qualified for World Cup

Timeline

Year Team	(France) 2008	(United Arab Emirates) 2009	(Italy) 2011	(French Polynesia) 2013	(Portugal) 2015	(The Bahamas) 2017	(Paraguay) 2019	(Russia) 2021	(United Arab Emirates) 2023	(Seychelles) 2025	Total
Belarus							R1	R1	4th	2nd	4
France	QF										1
Italy	2nd	QF	QF		4th	4th	2nd		2nd	QF	8
Netherlands				R1							1
Poland						R1					1
Portugal	3rd	3rd	3rd		1st	QF	1st	R1	QF	3rd	9
Russia	QF	QF	1st	1st	3rd		3rd	1st			7
Spain	4th	QF		2nd	R1			QF	R1	QF	7
Switzerland		2nd	R1		QF	QF	QF	3rd			6
Ukraine			R1	R1				••	••		2
Total no. of unique qualifiers											10

== Notes ==
- The fifth placed team does not always qualify to the World Cup:
- RFU:
1. At the 2021 edition, in accordance with a ban by the World Anti-Doping Agency (WADA) and a decision by the Court of Arbitration for Sport (CAS), the team from Russia was not permitted to use the Russian name, flag, or anthem; it participated in the World Cup as "the team of the Russian Football Union (RFU)", and used the flag of the Russian Olympic Committee. For the purpose of continuity in this article, the results of the RFU team in 2021 are considered as de facto results of the Russian national team.
- Results 2023 (r23):
1. The format of the 2023 event was different to all previous editions in that the tournament ended immediately following the matches that confirmed the four qualifiers to the World Cup (in prior years these matches would have been considered as the tournament's quarter-finals). There was therefore no semi-finals, final or third place match, and hence no champion of the event was crowned; all four qualifiers received a trophy recognising their achievement of qualification.
- Results 2024 (r24):
1. In 2024, the final and third place play-off had to be cancelled due to inclement weather conditions. The placements were therefore determined by the points accrued by the teams during the tournament's second group stage.
