= 2017 FIFA Beach Soccer World Cup qualification (UEFA) =

2017 FIFA Beach Soccer World Cup Qualification (UEFA)
FIFA Beach Soccer World Cup Qualifier - Europe - Jesolo 2016

Tournament details
- Host country: Italy
- City: Jesolo
- Dates: 2–11 September 2016
- Teams: 28 (from 1 confederation)
- Venue: 1 (in 1 host city)

Final positions
- Champions: Poland (1st title)
- Runners-up: Switzerland
- Third place: Portugal
- Fourth place: Italy

Tournament statistics
- Matches played: 79
- Goals scored: 643 (8.14 per match)
- Top scorer: (Switzerland) Dejan Stankovic (25 goals)
- Best player: (Poland) Bogusław Saganowski
- Best goalkeeper: (Poland) Szymon Gąsiński

The 2017 FIFA Beach Soccer World Cup qualifiers for UEFA was a beach soccer tournament played in Jesolo, Italy, from 2 to 11 September 2016, which determined the four teams that qualify to the 2017 FIFA Beach Soccer World Cup in the Bahamas.

Despite having five allocated spots for European nations at the World Cup, this was reduced to four for the 2017 edition as the World Cup hosts, the Bahamas, automatically claimed one of the two spots allocated to CONCACAF. And so as the confederation with the most slots, one UEFA spot was transferred over to CONCACAF to ensure that two nations would still have the opportunity to qualify from North America.

The format of the tournament was a round-robin group stage followed by the top ranking nations competing in a second round-robin group stage. The four top ranking nations from the second group stage, Poland, Switzerland, Portugal, and Italy, qualified for the World Cup and moved on to the knockout stage to ultimately crown a champion of the event.

== Teams and draw ==
A record 28 teams was planned to compete in this qualifier, one more than in the 2011 edition also held in Italy.

In the draw, held on 3 August 2016, teams were split into four pots according to their European ranking, and drawn into seven groups so that each group included a team from each pot.

Pot 1

- Portugal
- Russia
- Italy (hosts)
- Switzerland
- Spain
- Ukraine
- Hungary

Pot 2

- France
- Belarus
- Germany
- England
- Poland
- Greece
- Czech Republic

Pot 3

- Romania
- Azerbaijan
- Turkey
- Estonia
- Austria
- Netherlands
- Norway

Pot 4

- Moldova
- Serbia
- Bulgaria
- Kazakhstan
- Denmark
- Georgia
- Lithuania

== First group stage ==
The top-two teams from each group and the two best third-placed teams progressed to the second group stage. All times are local time CEST (UTC+2).

=== Group A ===
Pos	Team	Pld	W	W+	WP	L	GF	GA	GD	Pts	Qualification
1	Italy (H)	3	3	0	0	0	19	11	+8	9	Advance to second group stage
2	Turkey	3	2	0	0	1	18	11	+7	6	Advance to second group stage
3	Belarus	3	1	0	0	2	11	6	+5	3	Advance to second group stage
4	Serbia	3	0	0	0	3	5	25	−20	0	

Source: BSWW
(H) Host
2 September 2016
9:00

Belarus	2–3	Turkey
Bryshtel 3'; Samsonov 32'	Report(ru)	15', 23' Sinc; 30' Terziouglu

Referee: Antonio Joaquim Pereira Almeida (Portugal)
2 September 2016
18:00

Serbia	4–8	Italy
Radisavljević 10'; Ćetković 22', 24'; Vučićević 23'	Report(ru)	1' Corosiniti; 10', 12', 28' Gori; 13' Marinai; 22', 34' di Palma; 31' Ramacciotti

Referee: Vladimir Tashkov (Bulgaria)

3 September 2016
15:15

Belarus	8–1	Serbia
Bryshtel 5', 10' (pen.), 21', 34'; Kavaleu 12'; Kanstantsinau 24'; Miranovich 28'; Savich 31' (pen.)	Report(ru)	32' Ćetković

Referee: Thorsten Günther (Germany)
3 September 2016
17:50

Italy	9–6	Turkey
Gori 2' (pen.), 4', 14', 14', 18'; Zurlo 5', 32'; Ramacciotti 14'; Palmacci 20'	Report(ru)	2', 34' Terziouglu; 14' Semíh; 18' Keskin; 28' Sinc; 32' Yesilirmak

Referee: Jurijs Ivusins (Latvia)

4 September 2016
12:55

Turkey	9–0	Serbia
Sinc 4', 15', 26', 36'; Terziouglu 7' (pen.), 11', 21', 26'; Aslamaci 19'	Report(ru)

Referee: Antonio Joaquim Pereira Almeida (Portugal)
4 September 2016
17:45

Italy	2–1	Belarus
Ramacciotti 7'; Gori 20'	Report(ru)	9' Bryshtel

Referee: Jude Amin Utulu (Malta)

=== Group B ===
Pos	Team	Pld	W	W+	WP	L	GF	GA	GD	Pts	Qualification
1	Portugal	3	3	0	0	0	34	1	+33	9	Advance to second group stage
2	Moldova	3	2	0	0	1	10	18	−8	6	Advance to second group stage
3	England	3	1	0	0	2	7	15	−8	3	
4	Romania	3	0	0	0	3	7	24	−17	0	

Source: BSWW
2 September 2016
9:00

England	6–4	Romania
O'Rourke 3'; Lawson 20'; O'Neill 26'; Temple 34'; Day 35', 36'	Report(ru)	5' Ionut; 11', 18', 21' Marian Maciuca

Referee: Jude Amin Utulu (Malta)
2 September 2016
16:40

Moldova	0–15	Portugal
	Report(ru)	2' Madjer; 6', 32', 35' Jordan Santos; 6' Be Martins; 10', 24' Coimbra; 11', 17', 30', 36' Leo Martins; 20' Maria Fonseca; 25', 27' Novo; 27' Cavalcanti

Referee: Gionni Matticoli (Italy)

3 September 2016
11:30

England	0–3	Moldova
	Report(ru)	2' Gojocari; 11' Negara; 30' Iordachi

Referee: Lukasz Ostrowski (Poland)
3 September 2016
16:35

Portugal	11–0	Romania
Cavalcanti 7'; Jordan Santos 10', 24', 28'; Coimbra 11', 12'; Torres 14', 25'; Novo 15'; Maria Fonseca 16'; Be Martins 31'	Report(ru)

Referee: Csaba Baghy (Hungary)

4 September 2016
11:40

Romania	3–7	Moldova
Marian Maciuca 12'; Ionel Pousteca Pulhac 33'; Pana 35'	Report(ru)	2', 18', 35' Podlesnov; 10' Negara; 14', 34' Ciopa; 27' Nikolaiciuc

Referee: Laurynas Arzuolaitis (Lithuania)
4 September 2016
16:30

Portugal	8–1	England
Coimbra 4'; Leo Martins 12'; Madjer 13', 36'; Be Martins 16'; Jordan Santos 18'; Belchior 21', 26'	Report(ru)	22' Temple

Referee: Roman Borisov (Russia)

=== Group C ===
Pos	Team	Pld	W	W+	WP	L	GF	GA	GD	Pts	Qualification
1	Russia	3	3	0	0	0	16	6	+10	9	Advance to second group stage
2	Germany	3	1	1	0	1	12	12	0	5	Advance to second group stage
3	Kazakhstan	3	1	0	0	2	6	11	−5	3	
4	Norway	3	0	0	0	3	6	11	−5	0	

Source: BSWW
2 September 2016
11:45

Germany	4–3 (a.e.t.)	Norway
Kniller 13'; Romrig 18'; Biermann 27'; Keppinho 38'	Report(ru)	7', 31' Li; 11' Kristoffersson

Referee: Sofien Benchabane (France)
2 September 2016
15:30

Kazakhstan	1–5	Russia
Orazov 27'	Report(ru)	18' (o.g.) Perevyortov; 20', 26', 33' Shishin; 23' Gorchinskiy

Referee: Alfredo Balconi (Italy)

4 September 2016
9:00

Germany	5–2	Kazakhstan
Biermann 2'; Lovchev 12', 30'; Leyrao 13', 14'	Report(ru)	20' Eraly; 32' Radionov

Referee: Vladimir Tashkov (Bulgaria)
4 September 2016
15:00

Russia	4–2	Norway
Nikonorov 1', 11'; Paporotnyi 2'; Shishin 4'	Report(ru)	20' E. Salveson; 25' H. Salveson

Referee: Lukasz Ostrowski (Poland)

5 September 2016
15:20

Norway	1–3	Kazakhstan
Jalland 18'	Report(ru)	3' Tyulpa; 27' Yeraly; 35' Abdrassilov

Referee: Giuseppe Sicurella (Italy)
5 September 2016
17:45

Russia	7–3	Germany
Paporotnyi 2', 28'; Krasheninnikov 4'; Shkarin 6'; Romanov 29', 35'; Shishin 36'	Report(ru)	15' Romrig; 24' Kniller; 30' Beqiri

Referee: Sergio Filipe Gomes Soares (Portugal)

=== Group D ===
Pos	Team	Pld	W	W+	WP	L	GF	GA	GD	Pts	Qualification
1	Switzerland	3	3	0	0	0	33	1	+32	9	Advance to second group stage
2	Greece	3	2	0	0	1	9	9	0	6	Advance to second group stage
3	Netherlands	3	1	0	0	2	4	17	−13	3	
4	Lithuania	3	0	0	0	3	4	23	−19	0	

Source: BSWW
3 September 2016
9:00

Lithuania	1–16	Switzerland
Rebzdis 9'	Report(ru)	1', 10', 16', 17', 34' Stankovic; 5', 11', 12', 18' Hodel; 9', 21', 35' Spaccarotella; 22', 27', 30' Ott; 24' Wittlin

Referee: Manolo Picchio (Italy)
3 September 2016
12:45

Greece	5–1	Netherlands
Kafantaris 3', 4', 25'; Lignos 19'; Triantafyllidis 29'	Report(ru)	33' Rengers

Referee: Jude Amin Utulu (Malta)

5 September 2016
10:15

Greece	4–1	Lithuania
Kafantaris 8'; Aristeidis 13'; Lignos 19'; Komiotis 28'	Report(ru)	4' Pelakauskas

Referee: Jude Amin Utulu (Malta)
5 September 2016
14:00

Switzerland	10–0	Netherlands
Micev 2'; Ott 16', 23', 28', 36'; Stankovic 22', 33'; Hodel 29', 30'; Mo Jäggy 33'	Report(ru)

Referee: Ingilab Mammadov (Azerbaijan)

6 September 2016
11:30

Netherlands	3–2	Lithuania
Kampman 17'; Steenks 18'; Donker 32'	Report(ru)	7' Smolkovas; 34' Bartoshevich

Referee: Sofien Benchabane (France)
6 September 2016
15:40

Switzerland	7–0	Greece
Hodel 7', 24'; Ott 11', 16', 20'; Valentin Jäggy 24'; Stankovic 35'	Report(ru)

Referee: Lukasz Ostrowski (Poland)

=== Group E ===
Pos	Team	Pld	W	W+	WP	L	GF	GA	GD	Pts	Qualification
1	Spain	3	3	0	0	0	18	4	+14	9	Advance to second group stage
2	Poland	3	2	0	0	1	12	8	+4	6	Advance to second group stage
3	Estonia	3	1	0	0	2	10	10	0	3	
4	Denmark	3	0	0	0	3	4	22	−18	0	

Source: BSWW
2 September 2016
14:15

Denmark	2–10	Spain
Bonde 17'; Madsen 35'	Report(ru)	9', 13' Merida; 17' Martin Lima; 19', 31', 32', 33' Chiky; 26' Cintas; 35', 36' Molina Suarez

Referee: Roman Borisov (Russia)

3 September 2016
10:20

Poland	5–3	Estonia
Ziober 1'; Saganowski 3', 11', 13'; Kucharski 14'	Report(ru)	4' Lepik; 4' Rump; 25' Munskind

Referee: Sergio Filipe Gomes Soares (Portugal)

5 September 2016
11:30

Poland	5–1	Denmark
Saganowski 1'; Jesionowski 4'; Stasiak 15'; Gac 27'; Madani 35'	Report(ru)	13' Madsen

Referee: Csaba Baghy (Hungary)
5 September 2016
16:30

Spain	4–0	Estonia
Stüf 12' (o.g.); Gomez 14', 33'; Juanma 20'	Report(ru)

Referee: Jurijs Ivusins (Latvia)

6 September 2016
14:00

Estonia	7–1	Denmark
Mäerog 2', 6', 34'; Rump 13', 36'; Munskind 16'; Marmor 33' (pen.)	Report(ru)	34' (pen.) Oster

Referee: Thorsten Günther (Germany)
6 September 2016
18:00

Spain	4–2	Poland
Merida 14'; Gomez 15'; Chiky 22'; Juanma 31'	Report(ru)	18' Ziober; 23' Klepczarek

Referee: Gionni Matticoli (Italy)

=== Group F ===
Pos	Team	Pld	W	W+	WP	L	GF	GA	GD	Pts	Qualification
1	Ukraine	2	2	0	0	0	17	5	+12	6	Advance to second group stage
2	Czech Republic	2	1	0	0	1	7	13	−6	3	Advance to second group stage
3	Georgia	2	0	0	0	2	9	15	−6	0	
4	Austria	0	0	0	0	0	0	0	0	0	Withdrew^{[A]}

Source: BSWW

Austria withdrew before the start of the tournament due to "administrative reasons" preventing them from travelling to Jesolo. All of the scheduled matches involving them were subsequently cancelled.

3 September 2016
9:00

Czech Republic	Cancelled	Austria

3 September 2016
14:00

Georgia	5–8	Ukraine
Leo 7'; Shamiladze 11'; Todadze 17', 24', 31'	Report(ru)	9' Zborovskyi; 9', 15' Glutskyi; 10', 10' Riabchuk; 17' Panteleichuk; 33' Shcherytsia; 33' Korniichuk

Referee: Ingilab Mammadov (Azerbaijan)

5 September 2016
9:00

Czech Republic	7–4	Georgia
Vyhnal 2'; Visek 5'; Salák 10', 18', 29'; Klíma 10'; Chalupa 13'	Report(ru)	3', 10' Leo; 18', 26' Ivaniadze

Referee: Manolo Picchio (Italy)
5 September 2016
12:45

Ukraine	Cancelled	Austria

6 September 2016
10:15

Austria	Cancelled	Georgia

6 September 2016
12:45

Ukraine	9–0	Czech Republic
Hladchenko 4', 12'; Zborovskyi 7', 13'; Sydorenko 20'; Voitok 21'; Glutskyi 22', 30'; Riabchuk 31'	Report(ru)

Referee: Laurynas Arzuolaitis (Lithuania)

=== Group G ===
Pos	Team	Pld	W	W+	WP	L	GF	GA	GD	Pts	Qualification
1	France	3	3	0	0	0	17	11	+6	9	Advance to second group stage
2	Azerbaijan	3	2	0	0	1	13	7	+6	6	Advance to second group stage
3	Hungary	3	0	0	1	2	15	20	−5	1	Advance to second group stage
4	Bulgaria	3	0	0	0	3	8	15	−7	0	

Source: BSWW
2 September 2016
10:15

Bulgaria	5–5 (a.e.t.)	Hungary
Adamov 9'; Tuzakov 12', 32'; Lozanov 16'; Tsvetkov 39'	Report(ru)	6', 21' Turos; 7', 15' Patocs; 37' Csoszanszki
Penalties
Tuzakov (penalty scored); Lozanov (penalty missed); Parashkevov (penalty scored)	2–3	(penalty scored) Sebestyen; (penalty scored) Csoszanszki; (penalty scored) Szentes-Biro

Referee: Laurynas Arzuolaitis (Lithuania)
2 September 2016
13:10

France	3–2	Azerbaijan
Barbotti 3'; Samoun 31', 34'	Report(ru)	6' A. Zeynalov; 9' Hajiyev

Referee: Raúl Martín González Francés (Spain)

4 September 2016
10:15

Hungary	3–7	Azerbaijan
Csoszanszki 7'; Turos 14'; Nazarov 15' (o.g.)	Report(ru)	2', 14', 27' Allahguliyev; 8' Mammadov; 9', 34' A. Zeynalov; 32' Aliyev

Referee: Gionni Matticoli (Italy)
4 September 2016
14:00

France	6–2	Bulgaria
Angeletti 5'; Barbotti 15', 24'; Soares 23'; Maison 25'; Samoun 33'	Report(ru)	25', 29' Tuzakov

Referee: Alfredo Balconi (Italy)

6 September 2016
9:00

Azerbaijan	4–1	Bulgaria
A. Zeynalov 12'; Aliyev 25'; Hajiyev 27'; Mammadov 31' (pen.)	Report(ru)	14' Adamov

Referee: Antonio Joaquim Pereira Almeida (Portugal)
6 September 2016
16:45

Hungary	7–8	France
Csoszanszki 2', 13'; Patocs 6', 16', 17'; Turos 27'; Szentes-Biro 30'	Report(ru)	2', 13', 20', 23' Barbotti; 18', 32' Belhomme; 35' Basquaise; 36' Bizot

Referee: Ago Kartmann (Estonia)

=== Ranking of third-placed teams ===
Pos	Grp	Team	Pld	W	W+	WP	L	GF	GA	GD	Pts	Qualification
1	A	Belarus	2	0	0	0	2	3	5	−2	0	Advance to second group stage
2	G	Hungary	2	0	0	0	2	10	15	−5	0	Advance to second group stage
3	F	Georgia	2	0	0	0	2	9	15	−6	0	
4	E	Estonia	2	0	0	0	2	3	9	−6	0	
5	C	Kazakhstan	2	0	0	0	2	3	10	−7	0	
6	B	England	2	0	0	0	2	1	11	−10	0	
7	D	Netherlands	2	0	0	0	2	1	15	−14	0	

Source: BSWW

Note: Due to Austria's withdrawal, only results against the each groups' first- and second-placed teams were counted. Results against the teams that finished fourth in their group were discounted.

== Second group stage ==
The group winners advance to the semi-finals and secure qualification for the 2017 FIFA Beach Soccer World Cup.

=== Group I ===
Pos	Team	Pld	W	W+	WP	L	GF	GA	GD	Pts	Qualification
1	Italy (H)	3	3	0	0	0	15	8	+7	9	Qualified for the World Cup finals and advance to semi-finals
2	Czech Republic	3	1	0	0	2	10	13	−3	3	Play-offs for 5th to 8th place
3	Germany	3	1	0	0	2	12	13	−1	3	Play-offs for 9th to 12th place
4	Hungary	3	1	0	0	2	8	11	−3	3	Play-offs for 13th to 16th place

Source: BSWW
(H) Host
7 September 2016
09:00

Hungary	2–4	Germany
Patocs 20'; Csoszanszki 22'	Report(ru)	6', 10', 33' Romrig; 21' Weihrauch

Referee: Sergio Filipe Gomes Soares (Portugal)
7 September 2016
18:15

Czech Republic	2–5	Italy
Chalupa 18'; Salak 20'	Report(ru)	4' di Palma; 5' Palmacci; 13', 14', 32' Gori

Referee: Ingilab Mammadov (Azerbaijan)

8 September 2016
09:00

Hungary	4–2	Czech Republic
Berkes 2'; Balazs 3'; Sebestyen 21'; Genczler 31'	Report(ru)	30' Kovarik; 35' Gulina

Referee: Sofien Benchabane (France)
8 September 2016
17:45

Italy	5–4	Germany
Gori 8', 21'; Di Palma 18'; Ramacciotti 36', 36'	Report(ru)	8' Keppinho; 33', 36' Biermann; 34' Romrig

Referee: Łukasz Ostrowski (Poland)

9 September 2016
09:00

Germany	4–6	Czech Republic
Biermann 10', 13'; Kniller 12'; Beqiri 17'	Report(ru)	12', 13' Kovarik; 18' Vyhnal; 26' Salák; 30' (o.g.) Mönch; 33' Huráb

Referee: Raúl Martín González Francés (Spain)
9 September 2016
17:45

Italy	5–2	Hungary
Marinai 6'; Gori 15', 19', 22'; Corosiniti 30'	Report(ru)	18' Schentes-Biro; 35' Turosh

=== Group II ===
Pos	Team	Pld	W	W+	WP	L	GF	GA	GD	Pts	Qualification
1	Portugal	3	3	0	0	0	18	7	+11	9	Qualified for the World Cup finals and advance to semi-finals
2	France	3	1	0	1	1	14	13	+1	4	Play-offs for 5th to 8th place
3	Belarus	3	1	0	0	2	14	12	+2	3	Play-offs for 9th to 12th place
4	Greece	3	0	0	0	3	7	21	−14	0	Play-offs for 13th to 16th place

Source: BSWW
7 September 2016
10:15

Belarus	4–4 (a.e.t.)	France
Kamzolau 8'; Bryshtel 14', 33'; Miranovich 19'	Report(ru)	16' Basquaise; 25', 30', 35' Belhomme
Penalties
Brysthel (penalty missed); Samsonov (penalty scored); Bokach (penalty scored)	2–3	(penalty scored) Basquaise; (penalty scored) Barbotti; (penalty scored) Samoun

Referee: Gionni Matticoli (Italy)
7 September 2016
17:00

Greece	0–8	Portugal
	Report(ru)	6', 12', 24' Jordan Santos; 12' Coimbra; 25' Novo; 28' Leo Martins; 29' Cavalcanti; 34' (pen.) Belchior

Referee: Thorsten Günther (Germany)

8 September 2016
10:15

Belarus	6–3	Greece
Bryshtel 6', 16', 17', 32'; Bokach 10'; Slavutsin 24'	Report(ru)	18' Komiotis; 21' Papaefstratiou; 26' (pen.) Lignos

Referee: Csaba Baghy (Hungary)
8 September 2016
16:30

Portugal	5–3	France
Madjer 10', 25'; Jordan Santos 11'; Novo 32'; Be Martins 35'	Report(ru)	11' Basquaise; 28' Barbotti; 33' Bizot

Referee: Roman Borisov (Russia)

9 September 2016
10:15

France	7–4	Greece
Maison 3'; Samoun 5'; Barbotti 24'; Bizot 29', 34'; Basquaise 33'; Belhomme 36'	Report(ru)	3' Aristeidis; 27' Lignois; 30' Papaefstratiou; 33' Komiotis

Referee: Manolo Picchio (Italy)
9 September 2016
16:30

Portugal	5–4	Belarus
Jordan Santos 6', 36' (pen.); Madjer 16'; Belchior 20'; Maria Fonseca 30'	Report(ru)	12' (pen.) Bryshtel; 13' Slavutsin; 21' Kamzolau; 27' Bokach

=== Group III ===
Pos	Team	Pld	W	W+	WP	L	GF	GA	GD	Pts	Qualification
1	Poland	3	3	0	0	0	12	7	+5	9	Qualified for the World Cup finals and advance to semi-finals
2	Russia	3	1	1	0	1	15	11	+4	5	Play-offs for 5th to 8th place
3	Ukraine	3	1	0	0	2	13	10	+3	3	Play-offs for 9th to 12th place
4	Moldova	3	0	0	0	3	6	18	−12	0	Play-offs for 13th to 16th place

Source: BSWW
7 September 2016
11:45

Ukraine	3–4	Poland
Zborovskyi 1'; Korniichuk 3', 13'	Report(ru)	5' Saganowski; 29' Ziober; 33' Madani; 33' Klepczarek

Referee: Raúl Martín González Francés (Spain)
7 September 2016
15:45

Moldova	3–8	Russia
Eremia 7'; Iordachi 30'; Negara 36'	Report(ru)	6' (pen.), 9', 24' Paporotnyi; 14' Gorchinskiy; 15' Krasheninnikov; 17', 22' (pen.), 33' Nikonorov

Referee: Manolo Picchio (Italy)

8 September 2016
11:30

Ukraine	7–2	Moldova
Shcherytsia 4'; Zborovskyi 10', 33'; Arefiev 17' (o.g.); Korniichuk 19'; Sydorenko 28'; Pachev 36'	Report(ru)	12', 17' Ignat

Referee: Giuseppe Sicurella (Italy)
8 September 2016
15:15

Russia	3–5	Poland
Nikonorov 15'; Krasheninnikov 20'; Paporotnyi 21'	Report(ru)	5', 17', 29' Saganowski; 9' Gac; 36' Madani

Referee: Ago Kartmann (Estonia)

9 September 2016
11:30

Poland	3–1	Moldova
Stasiak 12'; Madani 31'; Saganowski 32'	Report(ru)	29' Negara

Referee: Jurijs Ivusins (Latvia)
9 September 2016
15:15

Russia	4–3 (a.e.t.)	Ukraine
Chuzhkov 23'; Paporotnyi 25'; Makarov 29', 37'	Report(ru)	5' Korniichuk; 18' Zborovskyi; 36' Shcherytsia

=== Group IV ===
Pos	Team	Pld	W	W+	WP	L	GF	GA	GD	Pts	Qualification
1	Switzerland	3	2	1	0	0	21	15	+6	8	Qualified for the World Cup finals and advance to semi-finals
2	Azerbaijan	3	2	0	0	1	13	10	+3	6	Play-offs for 5th to 8th place
3	Spain	3	1	0	0	2	14	14	0	3	Play-offs for 9th to 12th place
4	Turkey	3	0	0	0	3	8	17	−9	0	Play-offs for 13th to 16th place

Source: BSWW
7 September 2016
12:55

Spain	2–4	Azerbaijan
Mayor 22'; Cintas 26'	Report(ru)	27' Hajiyev; 29' Allahguliyev; 33' (o.g.) Dris; 36' Mammadov

Referee: Roman Borisov (Russia)
7 September 2016
14:15

Turkey	5–6 (a.e.t.)	Switzerland
Terziouglu 2', 5' (pen.), 32'; Sinc 19', 35'	Report(ru)	8', 19' (pen.), 20', 39' Stankovic; 27' Ott; 28' Hodel

Referee: Giuseppe Sicurella (Italy)

8 September 2016
12:45

Spain	8–2	Turkey
Merida 1'; Tracisto 4', 22'; Guisado 23'; Mayor 23'; Juanma 25', 27'; Dris 29'	Report(ru)	13' (pen.) Keskin; 34' Terziouglu

Referee: Jurijs Ivusins (Latvia)
8 September 2016
14:00

Switzerland	7–6	Azerbaijan
Stankovic 1', 9', 12' (pen.), 17', 30'; Wittlin 9'; Ott 25'	Report(ru)	5', 9' Zeynalov; 19' Nazarov; 25' Hajiyev; 32' Allahguliyev; 36' Sultanov

Referee: Alfredo Balconi (Italy)

9 September 2016
12:45

Azerbaijan	3–1	Turkey
Aliyev 7', 33'; Zeynalov 20'	Report(ru)	7' Keskin

Referee: Sergio Filipe Gomes Soares (Portugal)
9 September 2016
14:00

Switzerland	8–4	Spain
Misev 9'; Stankovic 13' (pen.), 27', 29'; Mo Jaeggi 14', 17'; Ott 19'; Spaccarotella 21'	Report(ru)	9', 25' Gomez; 21' Cintas; 36' Molina Suarez

Referee: Antonio Joaquim Pereira Almeida (Portugal)

== Final stage ==
The top team from each group in the second stage advance to the semi-finals to play for the title. The other teams eliminated from the second stage advance to classification play-offs (5th to 8th place, 9th to 12th place, 13th to 16th place) depending on their positions.

=== Play-offs for 13th to 16th place ===
13–16 places
10 September
Hungary	0
Greece	6
10 September
Turkey	7
Moldova	1

13th place match
11 September
Greece	5
Turkey	7
15th place match
11 September
Hungary (p)	4 (4)
Moldova	4 (3)

==== Semi-finals for 13th to 16th place ====
10 September 2016
09:00

Turkey	7–1	Moldova
Keskin 1', 2', 22', 36'; Terzioglu 12' (pen.); Yesilermak 29'; Bagci 33'	Report(ru)	34' Iordachi

Referee: Roman Borisov (Russia)
10 September 2016
10:15

Hungary	0–6	Greece
	Report(ru)	2' (o.g.) Genczler; 11' Karakasis; 26', 36' Triantafyllidis; 29' Papaefstratiou; 32' Papastathopoulos

Referee: Vladimir Tashkov (Bulgaria)

==== Play-off for 15th place ====
11 September 2016
09:00

Hungary	4–4 (a.e.t.)	Moldova
Csoczanszki 15', 29', 35'; Szentes-Biro 23'	Report(ru)	10', 29' Рodlesnov; 15' Nicolaiciuc; 31' Ignat
Penalties
Csoczanszki (penalty scored); Turos (penalty missed); Szentes-Biro (penalty scored); Berkes (penalty scored); Rutai (penalty scored)	4–3	(penalty missed) Iordachi; (penalty scored) Negara; (penalty scored) Ignat; (penalty scored) Podlesnov; (penalty missed) Nicolaiciuc

Referee: Ago Kartmann (Estonia)

==== Play-off for 13th place ====
11 September 2016
10:15

Greece	5–7	Turkey
Kafantaris 7'; Aristeidis 19', 22'; Triantafyllidis 25'; Lignos 33'	Report(ru)	7', 9', 33' Keskin; 13', 27', 31' Baris; 36' Yesilermak

Referee: Jurijs Ivusins (Latvia)

=== Play-offs for 9th to 12th place ===
9–12 places
10 September
Ukraine (p)	2 (3)
Germany	2 (2)
10 September
Belarus	2
Spain	4

9th place match
11 September
Ukraine	1
Spain	3
11th place match
11 September
Germany	1
Belarus	2

==== Semi-finals for 9th to 12th place ====
10 September 2016
11:30

Belarus	2–4	Spain
Shymanouski 21'; Samsonov 26'	Report(ru)	3', 9' Gomez; 24' Juanma; 35' Tracisto

Referee: Manolo Picchio (Italy)
10 September 2016
12:45

Ukraine	2–2 (a.e.t.)	Germany
Korniichuk 6'; Shcherytsia 16'	Report(ru)	16' Biermann; 22' Keppinho
Penalties
Medved (penalty scored); Glutskyi (penalty scored); Panteleichuk (penalty missed); Korniichuk (penalty missed); Pachev (penalty missed); Riabchuk (penalty scored)	3–2	(penalty scored) Biermann; (penalty missed) Thürk; (penalty scored) Romrig; (penalty missed) Keppinho; (penalty missed) Mönch; (penalty missed) Beqiri

Referee: Giuseppe Sicurella (Italy)

==== Play-off for 11th place ====
11 September 2016
11:30

Germany	1–2	Belarus
Beqiri 15'	Report(ru)	1', 2' Shymanouski

Referee: Sofien Benchabane (France)

==== Play-off for 9th place ====
11 September 2016
12:45

Ukraine	1–3	Spain
Panteleichuk 12'	Report(ru)	Merida 14'; Chiky 23', 24'

Referee: Thorsten Günther (Germany)

=== Play-offs for 5th to 8th place ===
5–8 places
10 September
Azerbaijan	3
Czech Republic	4
10 September
Russia	9
France	3

5th place match
11 September
Czech Republic	1
Russia	5
7th place match
11 September
Azerbaijan	3
France	4

==== Semi-finals for 5th to 8th place ====
10 September 2016
14:00

Russia	9–3	France
Makarov 1', 12'; Krasheninnikov 6', 18'; Gorchinskiy 12'; Shishin 20', 22'; Ilinskii 29'; Nikonorov 32'	Report(ru)	1' Belhomme; 23' Fischer; 31' Basquaise

Referee: Antonio Joaquim Pereira Almeida (Portugal)
10 September 2016
15:15

Azerbaijan	3–4	Czech Republic
A. Zeynalov 6'; Nazarov 34'; R. Aliyev 36'	Report(ru)	6', 34' Kovarik; 22' Sálak; 23' Chalupa

Referee: Gionni Matticoli (Italy)

==== Play-off for 7th place ====
11 September 2016
14:00

Azerbaijan	3–4	France
Sultanov 12'; A. Zeynalov 19'; Allahguliyev 23'	Report(ru)	4', 18' Angeletti; 18' Basquaise; 27' Bizot

Referee: Csaba Baghy (Hungary)

==== Play-off for 5th place ====
11 September 2016
15:15

Czech Republic	1–5	Russia
Vyhnal 14'	Report(ru)	4' Krasheninnikov; 10' Shkarin; 18', 31' Makarov; 21' Paporotnyi

Referee: Jude Amin Utulu (Malta)

=== Play-offs for 1st to 4th place ===
Semi-finals
10 September
Italy	2
Poland (a.e.t.)	3
10 September
Portugal	1
Switzerland	3

Final
11 September
Poland	6
Switzerland	3
Third place
11 September
Italy	3
Portugal	8

==== Semi-finals ====
10 September 2016
16:30

Portugal	1–3	Switzerland
Madjer 25'	Report(ru)	6', 29' Stankovic; 25' Hodel

Referee: Jude Amin Utulu (Malta)
10 September 2016
17:45

Italy	2–3 (a.e.t.)	Poland
Di Palma 5'; Palmacci 29'	Report(ru)	8' Saganowski; 9' Ziober; 39' Klepczarek

Referee: Ago Kartmann (Estonia)

==== Play-off for 3rd place ====
11 September 2016
16:30

Italy	3–8	Portugal
Gori 3', 19'; Ramacciotti 9'	Report(ru)	4', 35' Be Martins; 14' Cavalcanti; 18', 18' Coimbra; 19', 21', 34' Madjer

Referee: Laurynas Arzuolaitis (Lithuania)

==== Final ====
11 September 2016
17:45

Poland	6–3	Switzerland
Jesionowski 2', 18'; Ziober 9'; Saganowski 26', 36'; Lenart 36'	Report(ru)	5', 24', 33' Stankovic

Referee: Vladimir Tashkov (Bulgaria)

== Awards ==
=== Winners ===
2017 FIFA Beach Soccer World Cup
qualification (UEFA) champions

Poland
First title

=== Individual awards ===
The following awards were given at the conclusion of the tournament.

Most valuable player
(Poland) Bogusław Saganowski
Top scorer
(Switzerland) Dejan Stankovic (25 goals)
Best goalkeeper
(Poland) Szymon Gąsiński

== Goalscorers ==
25 goals

- (Switzerland) Dejan Stankovic

19 goals

- (Italy) Gabriele Gori

15 goals

- (Turkey) Baris Terzioglu

14 goals

- (Switzerland) Noel Ott

13 goals

- (Belarus) Ihar Bryshtel
- (Portugal) Jordan Santos

12 goals

- (Poland) Bogusław Saganowski

10 goals

- (Portugal) Madjer
- (Switzerland) Glenn Hodel
- (Turkey) Cem Keskin

9 goals

- (Azerbaijan) Asif Zeynalov
- (France) Anthony Barbotti
- (Russia) Artur Paporotnyi
- (Turkey) Ismail Kerem Sinc

8 goals

- (Hungary) David Csoszanszki
- (Portugal) Rui Coimbra

7 goals

- (Spain) Chiky
- (Spain) Llorenç Gomez
- (Germany) Christian Biermann
- (France) Stephane Belhomme
- (Russia) Boris Nikonorov
- (Russia) Dmitry Shishin
- (Ukraine) Oleh Zborovskyi

6 goals

- (Azerbaijan) Sabir Allahguliyev
- (Czech Republic) Michal Salák
- (France) Jeremy Basquaise
- (Germany) Oliver Romrig
- (Hungary) Richard Patocs
- (Italy) Dario Ramacciotti
- (Portugal) Be Martins
- (Portugal) Leo Martins
- (Russia) Yuri Krasheninnikov
- (Russia) Aleksey Makarov
- (Ukraine) Oleksandr Korniichuk

5 goals

- (Azerbaijan) Ramil Aliyev
- (Czech Republic) Jaroslav Kovarik
- (France) Baptiste Bizot
- (Greece) Michail Kafantaris
- (Greece) Stylianos Lignos
- (Hungary) Viktor Turos
- (Italy) Michele di Palma
- (Moldova) Leonid Podlesnov
- (Poland) Witold Ziober
- (Portugal) Bruno Novo
- (Spain) Juanma
- (Spain) Raul Merida

4 goals

- (Azerbaijan) Ilkin Hajiyev
- (Bulgaria) Georgi Tuzakov
- (France) Didier Samoun
- (Greece) Thomas Aristeidis
- (Greece) Theofilos Triantafyllidis
- (Moldova) Andrei Negara
- (Poland) Karim Madani
- (Portugal) Alan Cavalcanti
- (Portugal) Nuno Miguel Belchior
- (Romania) Marian Maciuca
- (Switzerland) Sandro Spaccarotella
- (Ukraine) Ivan Glutskyi
- (Ukraine) Yurii Shcherytsia

3 goals

- (Azerbaijan) Orkhan Mammadov
- (Belarus) Dzmitry Shymanouski
- (Czech Republic) Martin Chalupa
- (Czech Republic) Filip Vyhnal
- (Estonia) Priit Mäerog
- (Estonia) Ragnar Rump
- (France) Victor Angeletti
- (Germany) Valon Beqiri
- (Germany) Anton Kniller
- (Germany) Sascha Weirauch
- (Georgia (country)) Levan Nadar Leo
- (Georgia (country)) Kacha Todadze
- (Germany) Keppinho
- (Greece) Stavros Komiotis
- (Greece) Stratis Papaefstratiou
- (Hungary) Tamas Szentes-Biro
- (Italy) Paolo Palmacci
- (Moldova) Nicolae Ignat
- (Moldova) Victor Iordachi
- (Poland) Jakub Jesionowski
- (Poland) Piotr Klepczarek
- (Portugal) José Maria Fonseca
- (Russia) Yuri Gorchinskiy
- (Serbia) Ognjen Ćetković
- (Spain) Jose Cintas
- (Spain) Eduard Suarez Molina
- (Spain) Ezequiel Tracisto
- (Turkey) Volkan Yesilirmak
- (Ukraine) Ievgenii Riabchuk

2 goals

- (Azerbaijan) Amid Nazarov
- (Azerbaijan) Renat Sultanov
- (Belarus) Vadzim Bokach
- (Belarus) Dzmitry Kamzolau
- (Belarus) Ivan Miranovich
- (Belarus) Dzianis Samsonov
- (Belarus) Aleh Slavutsin
- (Bulgaria) Pavel Adamov
- (Denmark) Soren Madsen
- (England) Mitchell Day
- (England) James Temple
- (Estonia) Rasmus Munskind
- (France) Bryan Maison
- (Germany) Georgi Lovchev
- (Georgia (country)) Vaja Ivaniadze
- (Italy) Francesco Corosiniti
- (Italy) Simone Marinai
- (Italy) Emmanuele Zurlo
- (Kazakhstan) Abylay Yeraly
- (Moldova) Deonis Ciopa
- (Moldova) Sergiu Nicolaiciuc
- (Norway) Pak-ling Li
- (Poland) Filip Gac
- (Poland) Łukasz Stasiak
- (Portugal) Bruno Torres
- (Russia) Kirill Romanov
- (Russia) Anton Shkarin
- (Spain) Antonio Mayor
- (Switzerland) Mo Jäggy
- (Switzerland) Michael Misev
- (Switzerland) Remo Wittlin
- (Ukraine) Volodymyr Hladchenko
- (Ukraine) Viktor Panteleichuk
- (Ukraine) Vitalii Sydorenko

1 goal

- (Belarus) Ivan Kanstantsinau
- (Belarus) Aliaksandr Kavaleu
- (Belarus) Ilia Savich
- (Bulgaria) Tseno Lozanov
- (Bulgaria) Kaloyan Tsvetkov
- (Czech Republic) Patrik Hulina
- (Czech Republic) Tomás Huráb
- (Czech Republic) Miroslav Klíma
- (Czech Republic) Petr Visek
- (Denmark) Lasse Bond
- (Denmark) Tobias Oster
- (England) Scott Lawson
- (England) Tom O'Neill
- (England) Jaime O'Rourke
- (Estonia) Sander Lepik
- (Estonia) Kristian Marmor
- (France) Yannick Fischer
- (France) Julien Soares
- (Georgia (country)) Zurabi Shamiladze
- (Greece) Georgios Karakasis
- (Greece) Konstantinos Papastathopoulos
- (Hungary) Rutai Balazs
- (Hungary) Laszlo Berkes
- (Hungary) Kornel Genczler
- (Hungary) Norbert Sebestyen
- (Kazakhstan) Nurzhan Abdrassilov
- (Kazakhstan) Birzhan Orazov
- (Kazakhstan) Viktor Radionov
- (Kazakhstan) Vitaliy Tyulpa
- (Lithuania) Victor Bartashevich
- (Lithuania) Povilas Malakauskas
- (Lithuania) Andrius Rebzdis
- (Lithuania) Povilas Smolkovas
- (Moldova) Alexandru Eremia
- (Moldova) Grigorii Gojocari
- (Netherlands) Rick Donker
- (Netherlands) Maurice Kampman
- (Netherlands) Tom Rengers
- (Netherlands) Tim Steenks
- (Norway) Jorgen Jalland
- (Norway) Johann Kristoffersson
- (Norway) Henrik Salveson
- (Norway) Johan Elverum Salveson
- (Poland) Kamil Kucharski
- (Poland) Tomasz Lenart
- (Romania) Ionut Florea
- (Romania) Catalin Marian Pana
- (Romania) Ionel Pousteca Pulhac
- (Russia) Maxim Chuzhkov
- (Russia) Aleksei Ilinskii
- (Spain) Riduan Dris
- (Spain) Fernando Guisado
- (Spain) Martin Lima
- (Serbia) Marko Radisavljević
- (Serbia) Nemanja Vučićević
- (Switzerland) Valentin Jäggy
- (Turkey) Mehmet Aslamaci
- (Turkey) Yasin Bagci
- (Turkey) Semíh Tűrkmen
- (Ukraine) Roman Pachev
- (Ukraine) Maksym Voitok

Own goals

- (Azerbaijan) Amid Nazarov (playing against Hungary)
- (Estonia) Ervin Stüf (playing against Spain)
- (Germany) Manuel Mönch (playing against Czech Republic)
- (Hungary) Kornel Genczler (playing against Greece)
- (Kazakhstan) Dmitriy Perevyortov (playing against Russia)
- (Moldova) Alexandr Arefiev (playing against Ukraine)
- (Spain) Riduan Dris (playing against Azerbaijan)

== Final ranking ==
Qualified for the 2017 FIFA Beach Soccer World Cup

Rank	Team
1st place, gold medalist(s)	Poland
2nd place, silver medalist(s)	Switzerland
3rd place, bronze medalist(s)	Portugal
4	Italy
5	Russia
6	Czech Republic
7	France
8	Azerbaijan
9	Spain
10	Ukraine
11	Belarus
12	Germany
13	Turkey
14	Greece
15	Hungary
16	Moldova
17–27	Bulgaria
17–27	Denmark
17–27	England
17–27	Estonia
17–27	Georgia
17–27	Kazakhstan
17–27	Lithuania
17–27	Netherlands
17–27	Norway
17–27	Romania
17–27	Serbia

=== Qualified teams for FIFA Beach Soccer World Cup ===
The following four teams from UEFA qualified for the 2017 FIFA Beach Soccer World Cup.

Team	Qualified on	Previous appearances in tournament^{1} only FIFA-sanctioned era (since 2005)
Poland	8 September 2016	1 (2006)
Switzerland	9 September 2016	3 (2009, 2011, 2015)
Portugal	9 September 2016	7 (2005, 2006, 2007, 2008, 2009, 2011, **2015**)
Italy	9 September 2016	6 (2006, 2007, 2008, 2009, 2011, 2015)

^{1} Bold indicates champion for that year. Italic indicates host for that year.
