= 2008 FIFA Beach Soccer World Cup qualification (UEFA) =

Tournament details
- Host country: Spain
- Dates: 11–18 May 2008
- Teams: 24 (from 1 confederation)
- Venue(s): 1 (in 1 host city)

Final positions
- Champions: Spain (1st title)
- Runners-up: Portugal
- Third place: Russia
- Fourth place: Italy

Tournament statistics
- Matches played: 52
- Goals scored: 381 (7.33 per match)

The 2008 FIFA Beach Soccer World Cup qualifiers for (UEFA) was the first FIFA Beach Soccer World Cup qualification championship for Europe, held in Benidorm, Spain. Held in May 2008, hosts Spain won the championship, with Portugal finishing second and Russia winning the third place play off to finish third, beating Italy who finished fourth. The four nations moved on to play in the 2008 FIFA Beach Soccer World Cup in Marseille, France, from July 17 to 27. France qualified as the fifth European nation, being the hosts of the world cup.

== Participating teams ==
24 teams confirmed their participation in the competition.

- Andorra
- Austria
- Azerbaijan
- Belarus
- Czech Republic
- England
- Estonia
- Georgia
- Germany
- Greece
- Hungary
- Italy
- Latvia
- Lithuania
- Netherlands
- Norway
- Poland
- Portugal
- Romania
- Russia
- Spain
- Slovakia
- Switzerland
- Ukraine

== Group stage ==
The 24 teams were drawn into 6 groups of 4 teams.

=== Group A ===
| Team | Pld | W | W+ | L | GF | GA | GD | Pts |
|---|---|---|---|---|---|---|---|---|
| Spain | 3 | 3 | 0 | 0 | 19 | 3 | +16 | 9 |
| Germany | 3 | 2 | 0 | 1 | 12 | 10 | +2 | 6 |
| Belarus | 3 | 1 | 0 | 2 | 7 | 10 | -3 | 3 |
| Romania | 3 | 0 | 0 | 3 | 7 | 22 | -15 | 0 |

| Germany | 8 – 3 | Romania |
| Spain | 5 – 0 | Belarus |
| Germany | 3 – 1 | Belarus |
| Spain | 8 – 2 | Romania |
| Belarus | 6 – 2 | Romania |
| Spain | 6 – 1 | Germany |

=== Group B ===
| Team | Pld | W | W+ | L | GF | GA | GD | Pts |
|---|---|---|---|---|---|---|---|---|
| Russia | 3 | 2 | 0 | 1 | 14 | 7 | +7 | 6 |
| Czech Republic | 3 | 1 | 1 | 1 | 14 | 15 | -1 | 5 |
| Latvia | 3 | 1 | 0 | 2 | 10 | 13 | -3 | 3 |
| Netherlands | 3 | 0 | 1 | 2 | 10 | 13 | -3 | 2 |

| Czech Republic | 5 – 4 (a.e.t) | Netherlands |
| Russia | 4 – 1 | Latvia |
| Czech Republic | 7 – 5 | Latvia |
| Netherlands | 4 – 4 (1-0 pens.) | Russia |
| Latvia | 4 – 2 | Netherlands |
| Russia | 6 – 2 | Czech Republic |

=== Group C ===
| Team | Pld | W | W+ | L | GF | GA | GD | Pts |
|---|---|---|---|---|---|---|---|---|
| Italy | 3 | 2 | 1 | 0 | 10 | 5 | +5 | 8 |
| Greece | 3 | 1 | 0 | 2 | 9 | 6 | +3 | 3 |
| Norway | 3 | 1 | 0 | 2 | 8 | 11 | -3 | 3 |
| Azerbaijan | 3 | 1 | 0 | 2 | 6 | 11 | -5 | 3 |

| Italy | 4 – 2 | Azerbaijan |
| Norway | 4 – 3 | Greece |
| Azerbaijan | 3 – 2 | Norway |
| Italy | 1 – 1 (penalty) (1-0) | Greece |
| Greece | 5 – 1 | Azerbaijan |
| Italy | 5 – 2 | Norway |

=== Group D ===
| Team | Pld | W | W+ | L | GF | GA | GD | Pts |
|---|---|---|---|---|---|---|---|---|
| Portugal | 3 | 3 | 0 | 0 | 26 | 6 | +20 | 9 |
| England | 3 | 1 | 1 | 1 | 7 | 9 | -2 | 5 |
| Estonia | 3 | 1 | 0 | 2 | 11 | 7 | +4 | 3 |
| Georgia | 3 | 0 | 0 | 3 | 4 | 26 | -22 | 0 |

| England | 2 – 2 (penalty) (1-0) | Estonia |
| Portugal | 15 – 3 | Georgia |
| England | 4 – 1 | Georgia |
| Portugal | 5 – 2 | Estonia |
| Estonia | 7 – 0 | Georgia |
| Portugal | 6 – 1 | England |

=== Group E ===
| Team | Pld | W | W+ | L | GF | GA | GD | Pts |
|---|---|---|---|---|---|---|---|---|
| Ukraine | 3 | 3 | 0 | 0 | 17 | 9 | +8 | 9 |
| Poland | 3 | 2 | 0 | 1 | 11 | 7 | +4 | 6 |
| Slovakia | 3 | 1 | 0 | 2 | 12 | 16 | -4 | 3 |
| Andorra | 3 | 0 | 0 | 3 | 9 | 17 | -8 | 0 |

| Poland | 4 – 1 | Slovakia |
| Ukraine | 6 – 2 | Andorra |
| Poland | 4 – 2 | Andorra |
| Ukraine | 7 – 4 | Slovakia |
| Slovakia | 7 – 5 | Andorra |
| Ukraine | 4 – 3 | Poland |

=== Group F ===
| Team | Pld | W | W+ | L | GF | GA | GD | Pts |
|---|---|---|---|---|---|---|---|---|
| Switzerland | 3 | 3 | 0 | 0 | 23 | 7 | +16 | 9 |
| Hungary | 3 | 2 | 0 | 1 | 10 | 8 | +2 | 6 |
| Lithuania | 3 | 1 | 0 | 2 | 9 | 22 | -13 | 3 |
| Austria | 3 | 0 | 0 | 3 | 6 | 11 | -5 | 0 |

| Hungary | 3 – 1 | Austria |
| Switzerland | 14 – 3 | Lithuania |
| Hungary | 6 – 2 | Lithuania |
| Switzerland | 4 – 3 | Austria |
| Lithuania | 4 – 2 | Austria |
| Switzerland | 5 – 1 | Austria |

== Knockout stage ==
Round of 16
15 July
Spain | 6
Norway | 3
15 July
Czech Republic | 4
Hungary | 1
15 July
Italy | 4
Belarus | 3
15 July
Ukraine | 6
England | 0
15 July
Portugal | 8
Latvia | 1
15 July
Greece | 4
Germany | 3 (AET)
15 July
Russia | 6
Estonia | 0
15 July
Switzerland | 4
Poland | 3

Quarter-finals
16 July
Spain | 7
Czech Republic | 1
16 July
Italy | 8
Ukraine | 3
16 July
Portugal | 8
Greece | 0
16 July
Russia | 3
Switzerland | 2

Semi-finals
17 July
Spain | 3
Italy | 3 (1-0)p
17 July
Portugal | 2
Russia | 1

Final
18 July
Spain | 4
Portugal | 3
Third place
18 July
Russia | 4
Italy | 2

=== Round of 16 ===
15 May 2008

| Spain | 6 – 3 | Norway |

Benidorm

15 May 2008

| Czech Republic | 4 – 1 | Hungary |

Benidorm

15 May 2008

| Italy | 4 – 3 | Belarus |

Benidorm

15 May 2008

| Ukraine | 6 – 0 | England |

Benidorm

15 May 2008

| Portugal | 8 – 1 | Latvia |

Benidorm

15 May 2008

| Greece | 4 – 3 (AET) | Germany |

Benidorm

15 May 2008

| Russia | 6 – 0 | Estonia |

Benidorm

15 May 2008

| Switzerland | 4 – 3 | Poland |

Benidorm

=== Quarter finals ===
16 May 2008

| Spain | 7 – 1 | Czech Republic |

Benidorm

16 May 2008

| Italy | 8 – 3 | Ukraine |

Benidorm

16 May 2008

| Portugal | 8 – 0 | Greece |

Benidorm

16 May 2008

| Russia | 3 – 2 | Switzerland |

Benidorm

=== Semi finals ===
17 May 2008

| Spain | 3 – 3 (penalty) (1-0) | Italy |

Benidorm

17 May 2008

| Portugal | 2 – 1 | Russia |

Benidorm

=== Third place play off ===
18 May 2008

| Russia | 4 – 2 | Italy |

Benidorm

=== Final ===
18 May 2008

| Spain | 4 – 3 | Portugal |

Benidorm

== Winners ==
(2008) FIFA Beach Soccer World Cup:
Qualification (UEFA) Winners

Spain
First title
