= Moldova national beach soccer team =

Moldova
- Nickname: Tricolorii (The Tricolours)
- Association: Moldovan Football Federation (FMF)
- Confederation: UEFA (Europe)
- Head coach: Ruslan Pernai
- Captain: Grigore Cojocari
- Home stadium: Orange Arena
- FIFA code: MDA
- BSWW ranking: 30 ▲3 (1 June 2026)
First colours
Second colours

First international
- Moldova 3–9 Czech Republic (Valence, France; 21 June 2013)

Biggest win
- Moldova 6–1 Latvia (Castellammare di Stabia, Italy; 27 July 2025)

Biggest defeat
- Moldova 0–15 Portugal (Jesolo, Italy; 2 September 2016)
- Website: fmf.md (in Romanian)

The Moldova national beach soccer team (Romanian: Echipa națională de fotbal pe plajă a Moldovei) represents Moldova in international beach soccer competitions and is controlled by the Moldovan Football Federation, the governing body for football in Moldova.

== Results and fixtures ==
The following is a list of match results in the last 12 months, as well as any future matches that have been scheduled.

Win Draw Loss Fixture

=== 2026 ===
5 April 2026 Friendly	Moldova	5–8	Azerbaijan	Alanya, Turkey
		Report		Stadium: Alanya Belediyespor Beach Stadium

7 April 2026 Friendly	Moldova	3–7	Azerbaijan	Alanya, Turkey
		Report		Stadium: Alanya Belediyespor Beach Stadium

8 April 2026 Friendly	Moldova	2–2 (1–4 p)	Azerbaijan	Alanya, Turkey
		Report		Stadium: Alanya Belediyespor Beach Stadium

29 July 2026 2026 Euro Beach Soccer League Stage 3	Kazakhstan	1–2	Moldova	Chișinău, Moldova
	Muralinov 26'	Report	Florea 18'; Ignat 19'	Stadium: Orange Arena; Attendance: 1,000; Referee: Jurijs Ivusins (Latvia)

30 July 2026 2026 Euro Beach Soccer League Stage 3	Moldova	4–1	Belgium	Chișinău, Moldova
	Sîrghi 5', 12', 34'; Gurjui 9'	Report	Jonathan 24'	Stadium: Orange Arena; Attendance: 1,000; Referee: Laurynas Arzuolaitis (Lithuana)

31 July 2026 2026 Euro Beach Soccer League Stage 3	Moldova	0–9	Italy	Chișinău, Moldova
		Report	Fazzini 4'; Bertacca 6'; Giordani 7'; Josep Jr. 15'; Genovali 17'; Alla 17'; Remedi A. 24', 29'; Casapieri 24'	Stadium: Orange Arena; Attendance: 1,200; Referee: Sérgio Filipe Gomes Soares (Portugal)

1 August 2026 2026 Euro Beach Soccer League Stage 3 Semi-finals	Denmark	4–0	Moldova	Chișinău, Moldova
	Wegeberg 3', 22'; Pilgaard 14'; Madsen 26'	Report		Stadium: Orange Arena; Attendance: 1,000; Referee: Laurynas Arzuolaitis (Lithuana)

2 August 2026 2026 Euro Beach Soccer League Stage 3 3rd place match	Germany	5–3	Moldova	Chișinău, Moldova
	Mülling 18'; Schulte 24'; Peterson 33'; Baaske 33'; Olli 34'	Report	Peterson 2' (o.g.); Florea 17'; Beșelea 36'	Stadium: Orange Arena; Attendance: 800; Referee: Jurijs Ivusins (Latvia)

8 September 2026 2026 Euro Beach Soccer Superfinal	Moldova	2–9	Italy	Viareggio, Italy
	Stăvilă 11'; Creciun 19'	Report	Alla 4', 23'; Andriani 8'; Bertacca 9', 10'; Sassari 15'; Creciun 24' (o.g.); Fazzini 27'; Reggio 30'	Stadium: Matteo Valenti Beach Stadium; Referee: Vladimir Tashkov (Bulgaria)

9 September 2026 2026 Euro Beach Soccer Superfinal	Denmark	8–4	Moldova	Viareggio, Italy
	Madsen 3'; Hansen 9'; Damm 22'; Wegeberg 24'; Levin 29'; Jensen 31', 33'; De Fries 32'	Report	Istrati 9'; Turta 24'; Eremia 27'; Stăvilă 33'	Stadium: Matteo Valenti Beach Stadium; Referee: Angelika Gębka (Poland)

11 September 2026 2026 Euro Beach Soccer Superfinal	Germany	4–5 (a.e.t.)	Moldova	Viareggio, Italy
	Vasilets 12'; Baaske 22'; Peterson 25'; Schulte 27'	Report	Creciun 12', 18', 37'; Sîrghi 15'; Stăvilă 27'	Stadium: Matteo Valenti Beach Stadium; Referee: Mehdi Sayoud (Belgium)

12 September 2026 2026 Euro Beach Soccer Superfinal	Moldova	1–6	Belarus	Viareggio, Italy
	Beșelea 15'	Report	Ryabko 13', 25'; Bryshtsel 17', 36'; Chaikouski 31'; Piatrouski 32'	Stadium: Matteo Valenti Beach Stadium; Referee: Moreno Francesco Longo (Italy)

13 September 2026 2026 Euro Beach Soccer Superfinal	Moldova	3–2	Germany	Viareggio, Italy
	Beșelea 2', 31'; Turta 8' (pen.)	Report	Olli 30', 31'	Stadium: Matteo Valenti Beach Stadium; Referee: Matthieu Dor (France)

=== 2026 Euro Beach Soccer League ===
==== Superfinal ====
===== Group A =====
Pos	Team	Pld	W	W+	WP	L	GF	GA	GD	Pts
1	Italy (H)	3	3	0	0	0	25	7	+18	9
2	Denmark	3	1	0	0	2	12	13	−1	3
3	Moldova	3	0	1	0	2	11	21	−10	2
4	Germany	3	0	0	1	2	9	16	−7	0

==== Stage 3. Division A ====
===== Group C =====
Pos	Team	Pld	W	W+	WP	L	GF	GA	GD	Pts
1	Italy	3	3	0	0	0	27	2	+25	9
2	Moldova (H)	3	2	0	0	1	6	11	−5	6
3	Kazakhstan	3	0	0	1	2	5	17	−12	1
4	Belgium	3	0	0	0	3	5	13	−8	0

== Current squad ==
The following players were selected for the 2026 Euro Beach Soccer League Superfinal.

Note: Flags indicate national team as defined under FIFA eligibility rules; some limited exceptions apply. Players may hold more than one non-FIFA nationality.

No.	Pos.	Nation	Player
1	GK	MDA	Alexei Capsamun
2	DF	MDA	Artiom Turta
4	FW	MDA	Alexandru Sîrghi
5	FW	MDA	Cătălin Beșelea
8	DF	MDA	Stanislav Stavilă
11	FW	MDA	Nicolae Ignat (captain)

No.	Pos.	Nation	Player
12	GK	MDA	Ruslan Istrati
13	DF	MDA	Alexandru Eremia
16	GK	MDA	Alexandru Pădureț
17	FW	MDA	Emmanuil Gherganov
18	FW	MDA	David Damaschin
19	FW	MDA	Veaceslav Creciun

Head coach: Ruslan Pernai
