= FMF Beach Soccer Arena =

Beach soccer arena in Moldova

- Arena de fotbal pe plajă a FMF
- Orange Arena; La Izvor Stadium
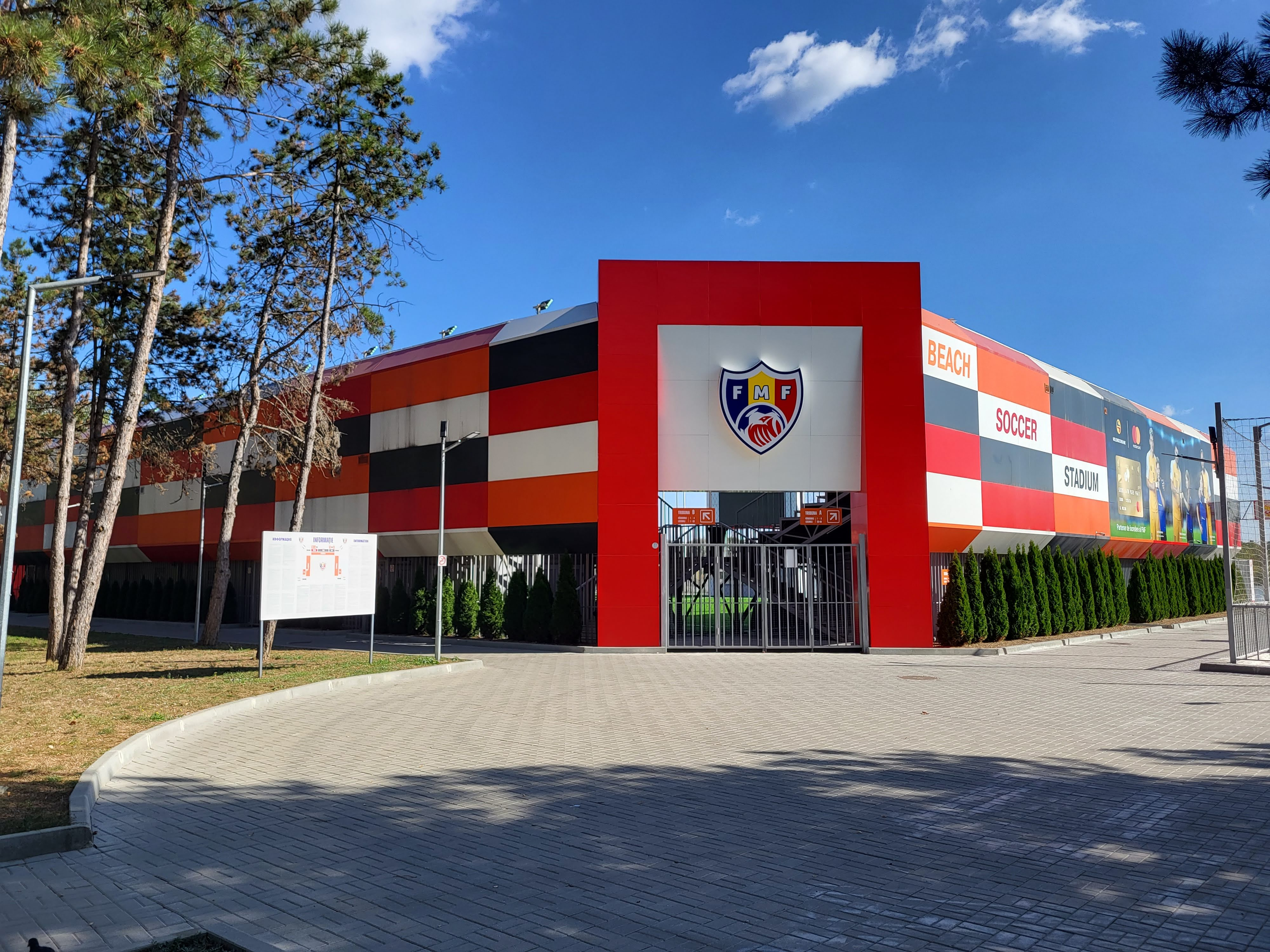
- The arena in 2023
- Interactive map of FMF Beach Soccer Arena
- Address: Ghidighici Street; Chișinău; Moldova
- Coordinates: 47.04748592173853°N 28.785556070107557°E
- Owner: Moldovan Football Federation
- Capacity: 1,100
- Surface: Sand, Artificial turf
- Scoreboard: Yes
- Field size: 37m x 27m Sand Field, 44m x 32m Open Game Area
- Field shape: Rectangular
- Parking: 400 spaces

Construction
- Built: 2020
- Opened: 28 August 2020
- Architects: Denis Nedeoglo (EOS-STUDIO, Moldova)
- Project managers: Denis Nedeoglo (EOS-STUDIO, Moldova)
- Main contractors: VARINCOM, Moldova

Tenant
- Moldova national beach soccer team (2020–present)

The FMF Beach Soccer Arena (Romanian: Arena de fotbal pe plajă a FMF), also referred to as Orange Arena for sponsorship reasons, is a beach soccer stadium in Chișinău, Moldova. It is located in the La Izvor Park in the Buiucani sector of Moldova's capital. The stadium was inaugurated in August 2020.

The Moldovan Football Federation (FMF), with the collaboration of FIFA and the Chișinău Municipal Council are the responsible parties of the project.

== Construction ==
The construction project commenced in March 2019. In terms of financing, FIFA played a pivotal role by contributing a substantial portion of the construction costs, covering approximately 80% of the expenses, which amounted to roughly 1 million euros. This financial backing was provided with the condition that the FMF would oversee the arena's management for a minimum period of 25 years.

== Opening ==
The FMF Beach Soccer Arena celebrated its formal inauguration on August 27, coinciding with Moldova's Independence Day. The event featured the presence of Moldova's President, Igor Dodon, along with dignitaries representing the Moldovan Football Federation (FMF) and other notable individuals.

== Facilities ==
The arena features a seating capacity of up to 1500 spectators, with additional VIP seating for 244. It offers team dressing rooms, referee facilities, a first aid room, and evening event lighting. With its mobile platform, it accommodates various sports year-round, including mini-football, socca, beach rugby and beach volleyball. Surrounding amenities, such as mini-football fields and tennis courts, enhance its appeal as a multifunctional hub for sports and cultural events in Moldova.

== Usage ==
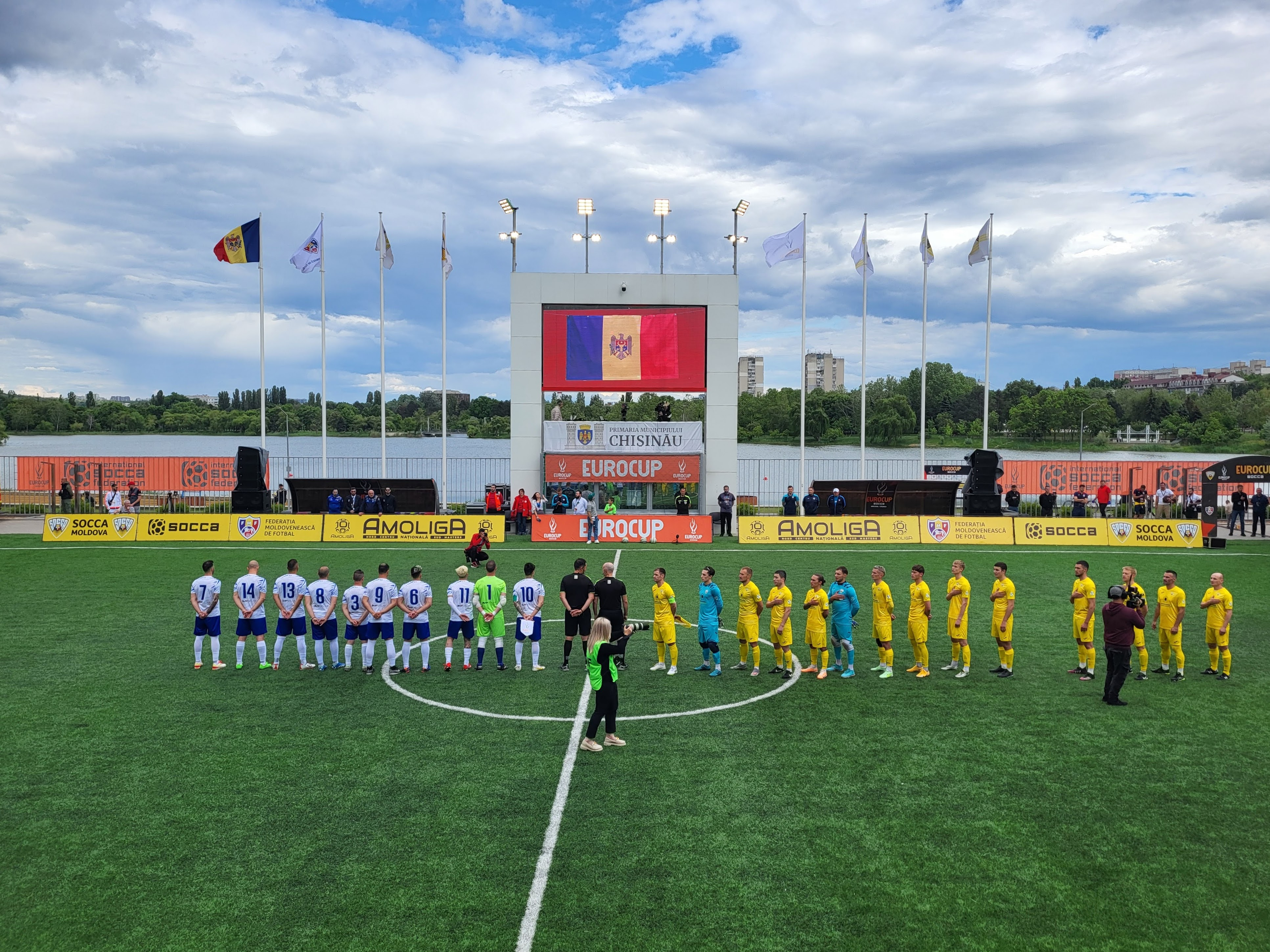
2024 Socca EuroCup

The FMF Beach Soccer Arena in Chișinău serves as a venue, accommodating sports events like beach soccer, international tournaments such as the Euro Beach Soccer League.

It was the main venue for both Socca EuroCup events held in 2023 and 2024.

The arena hosted a round of the Euro Beach Soccer League in both 2025 and 2026, as well as a round of the 2026 Women's Euro Beach Soccer League.

It also hosted various cultural performances like concerts by Alternosfera, community engagement, and global sports recognition.

== Gallery ==
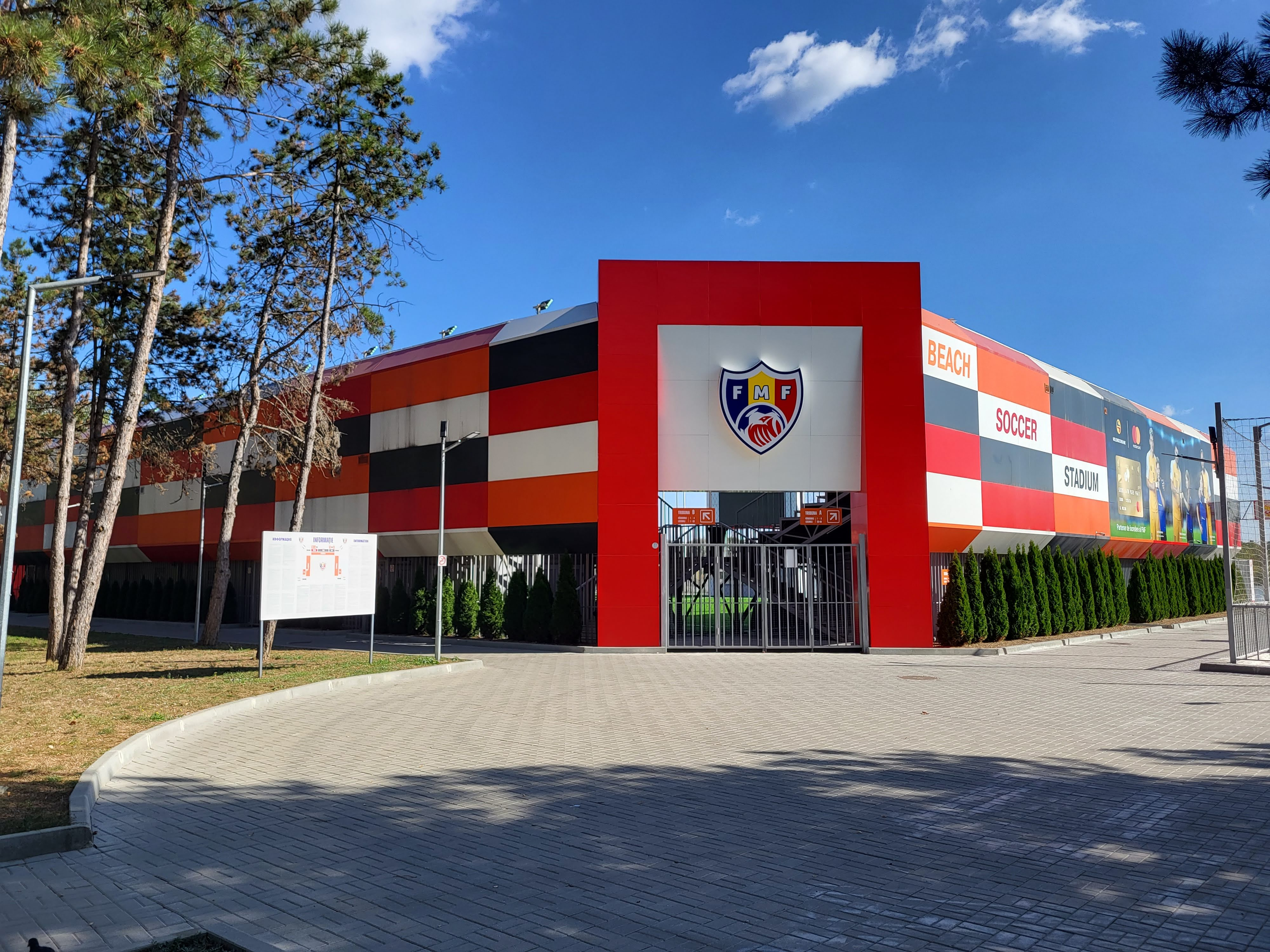
The entrance from the park

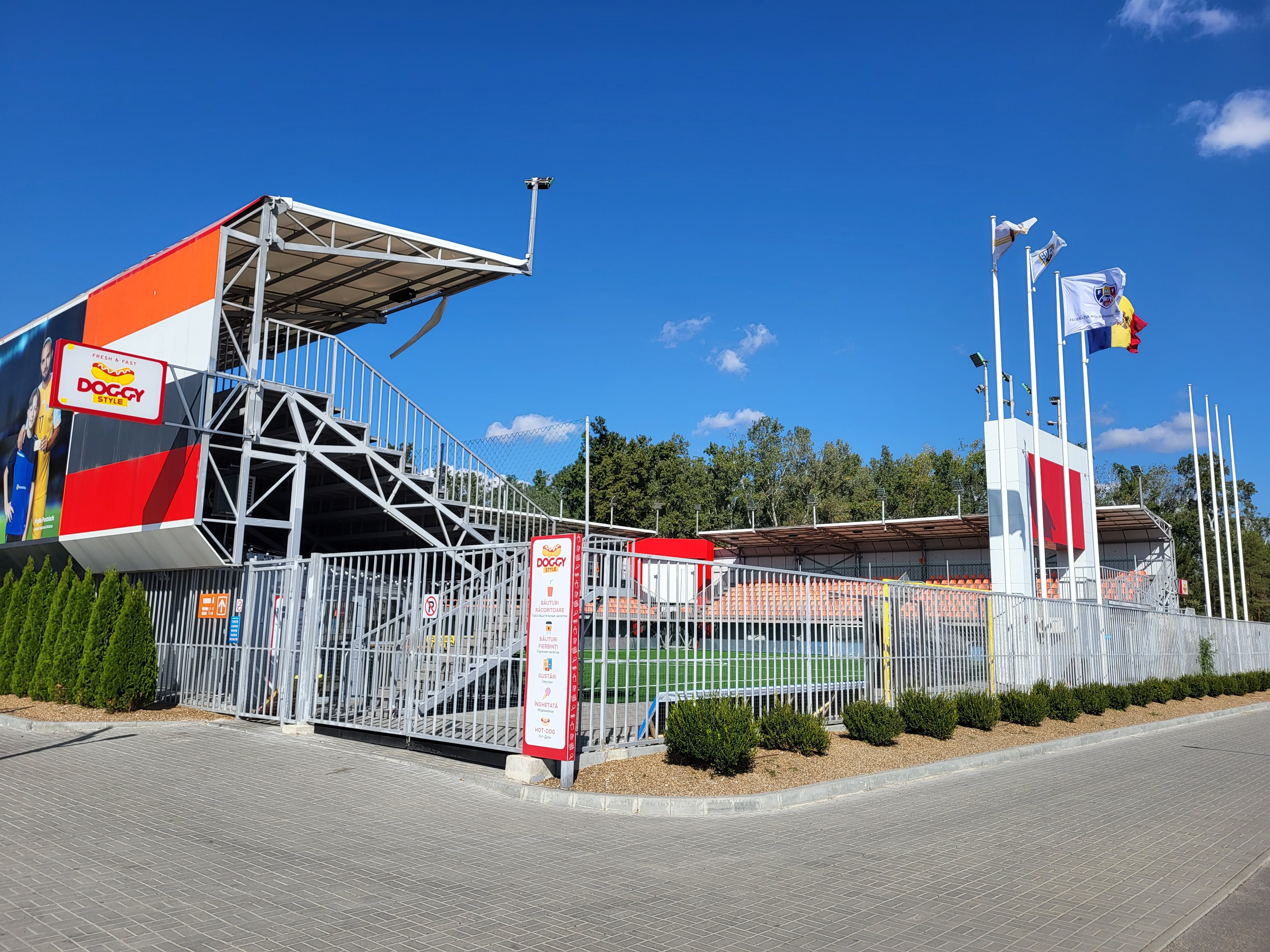
View from the beach

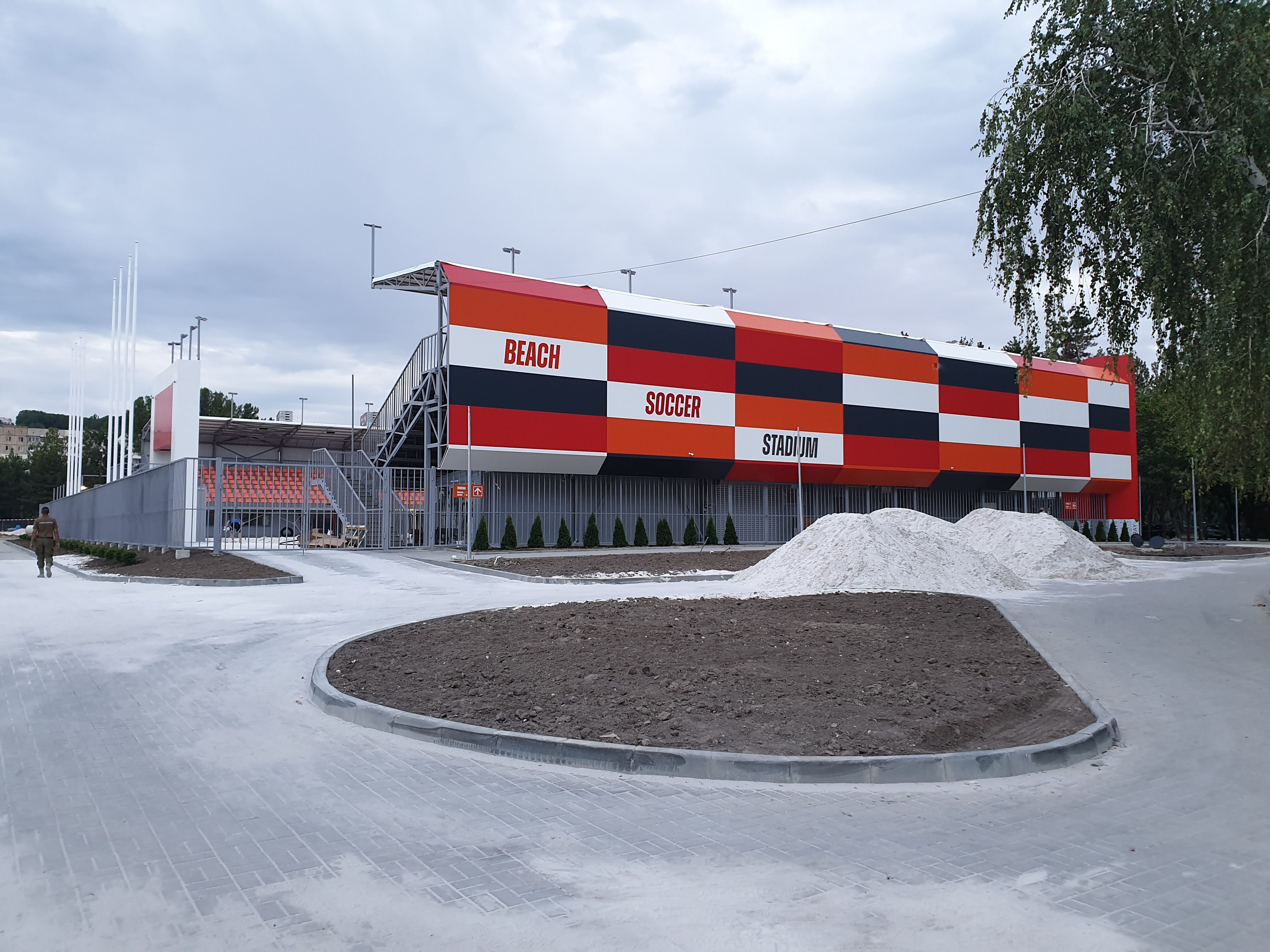
The arena two weeks prior to opening

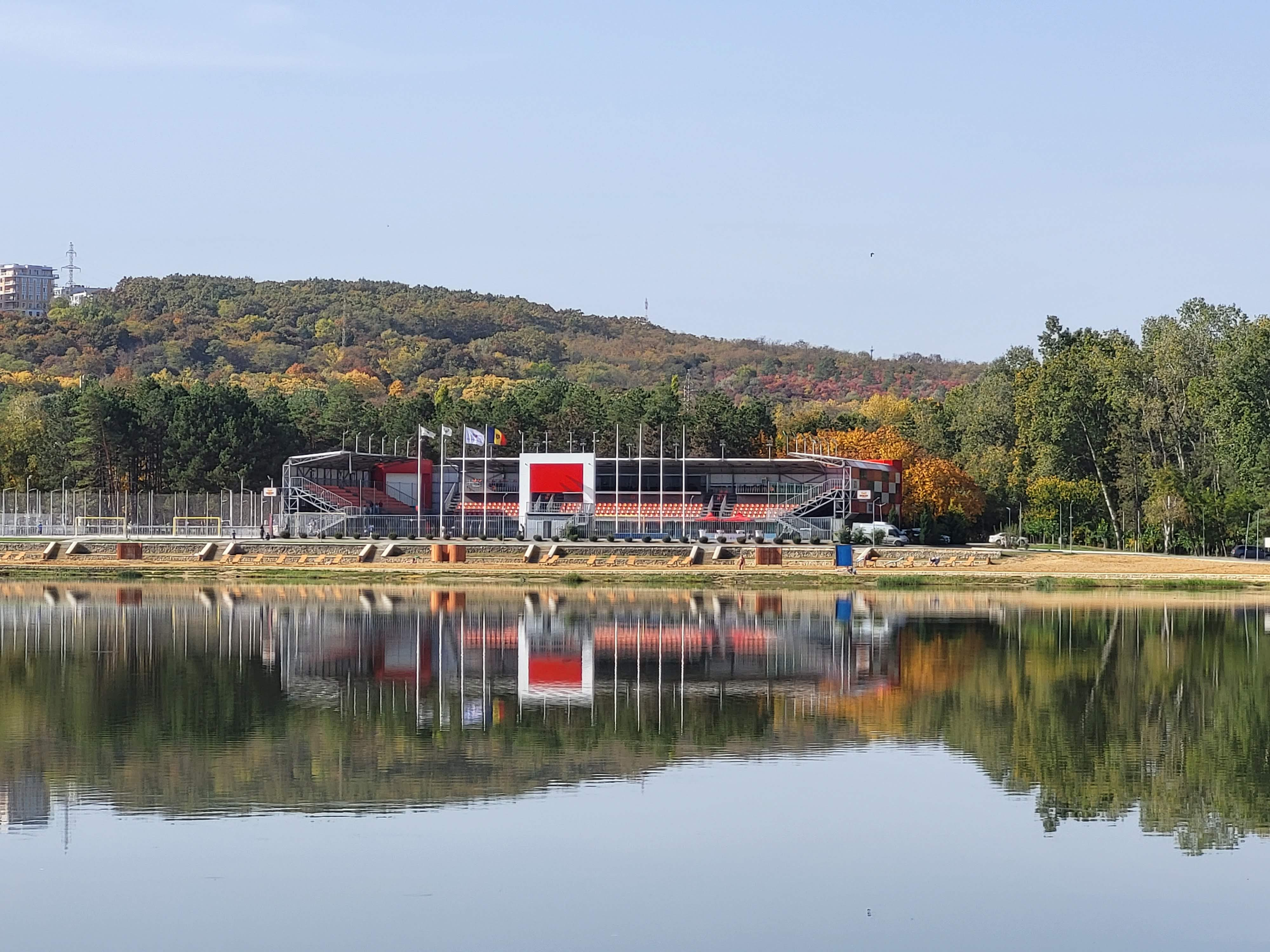
The arena viewed from the other side of the lake

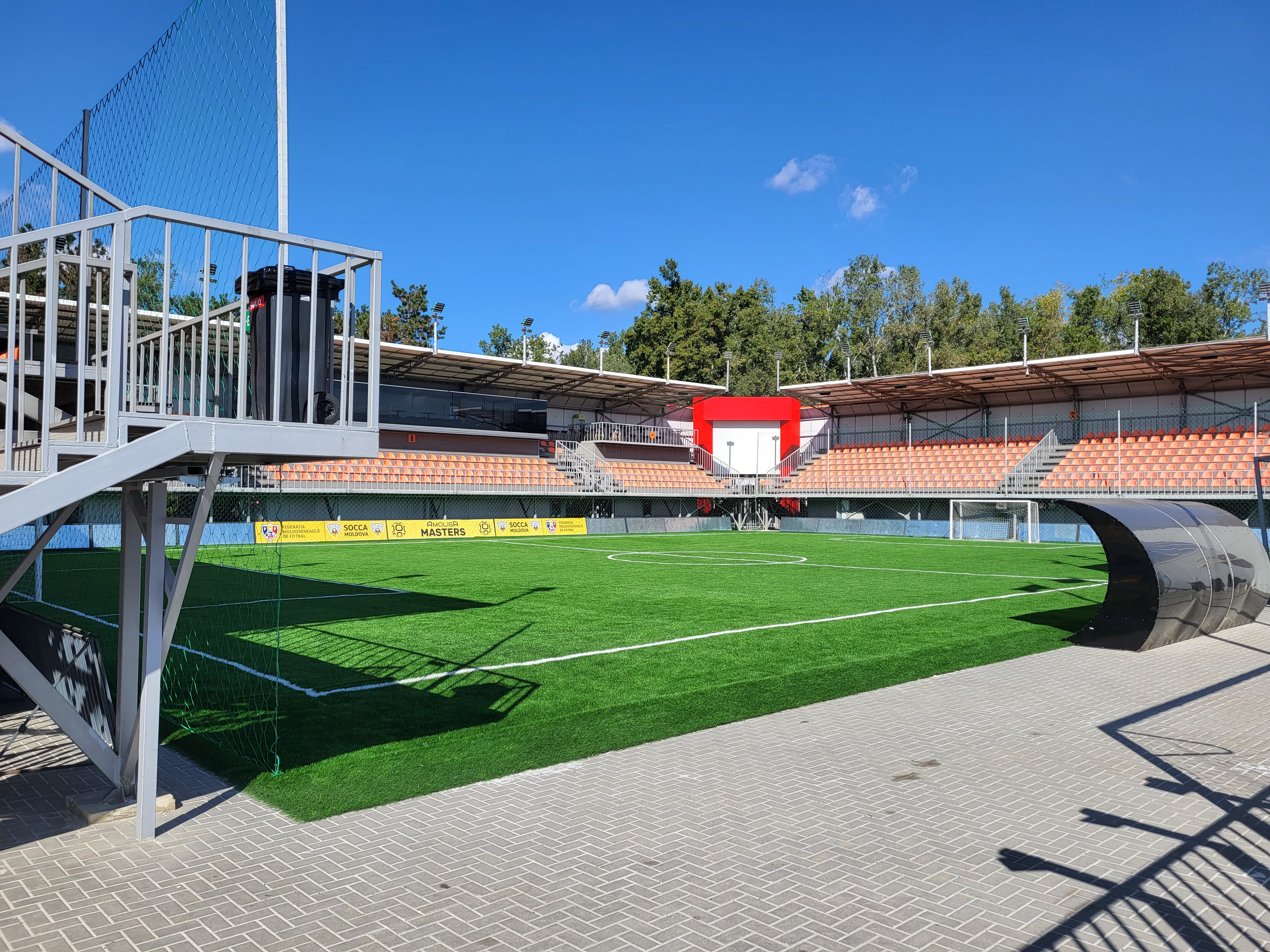
Inside of the arena
