= Kazakhstan national beach soccer team =

Kazakhstan
- Association: Football Federation of Kazakhstan
- Confederation: UEFA (Europe)
- Head coach: Erlan Dzhamantaev
- Captain: Viktor Chornyy
- Most caps: Viktor Radionov (11)
- Top scorer: Dmitriy Perevyortov (8)
- FIFA code: KAZ
- BSWW ranking: 72 ▼1 (2 June 2025)
First colours
Second colours

First international
- Kazakhstan 1-5 France (San Michele al Tagliamento, Italy; 11 July 2010)

Biggest win
- Kazakhstan 4-0 Greece (Moscow, Russia; 21 July 2018)

Biggest defeat
- Kazakhstan 4-12 Italy (Moscow, Russia; 23 July 2019)

The Kazakhstan national beach soccer team represents Kazakhstan in international beach soccer competitions and is controlled by the Football Federation of Kazakhstan, the governing body for football in Kazakhstan.

== Competitive record ==
=== FIFA Beach Soccer World Cup Qualification (UEFA) ===
FIFA Beach Soccer World Cup Qualification Record
Year	Result	Pld	W	WE	WP	L	GS	GA	Dif	Pts
(Spain) 2008	Did not enter	-	-	-	-	-	-	-	-	-
(Spain) 2009	Did not enter	-	-	-	-	-	-	-	-	-
(Italy) 2011	Group stage	3	0	0	0	3	5	22	-17	0
(Russia) 2013	Did not enter	-	-	-	-	-	-	-	-	-
(Italy) 2015	Did not enter	-	-	-	-	-	-	-	-	-
(Italy) 2017	Group stage	3	1	0	0	2	6	11	-5	3
(Russia) 2019	Round of 16	4	1	0	0	3	11	22	–11	3
(Portugal) 2021	Round of 16	6	1	0	0	5	15	28	–12	4
(Azerbaijan) 2023	Ongoing									
Total	5/9	10	2	0	0	8	22	55	-33	6

== Current squad ==
As of 25 July 2025

The following 12 players were called for the stage 3 of the 2025 Euro Beach Soccer League.

No.	Pos.	Player	Date of birth (age)	Club
1	GK	Dastamiden Dagiyev	31 July 1992 (age 33)	(Kazakhstan) Arman Pablodar
3	DF	Nurdaulet Bolatbek	22 February 1990 (age 35)	(Kazakhstan) FC Malaisary
6	DF	Mikhail Kaizer	6 August 2004 (age 20)	(Kazakhstan) Arman Pablodar
7	DF	Aidyn Malikov	30 October 1993 (age 31)	(Kazakhstan) FC Malaisary
8	DF	Igor Demeshko	1 April 1989 (age 36)	(Kazakhstan) Arman Pablodar
9	FW	Artur Dering	31 August 2006 (age 18)	(Kazakhstan) TK B&A
12	GK	Dmitriy Brovko	16 January 1996 (age 29)	(Kazakhstan) Barqy
14	FW	Arman Shotanov	25 February 2001 (age 24)	(Kazakhstan) Barqy
15	DF	Abdikadyr Kurbanov	11 August 2000 (age 24)	(Kazakhstan) Omega
16	DF	Nurlan Zhunussov	10 August 1996 (age 28)	(Kazakhstan) TK B&A
17	FW	Alan Minbayev	24 November 2003 (age 21)	(Kazakhstan) Arman Pablodar
18	DF	Vladislav Shevchuk	29 March 2004 (age 21)	(Kazakhstan) Arman Pablodar

== Achievements ==
- FIFA Beach Soccer World Cup qualification (UEFA) Best: Group stage
  - 2011
