= Georgia national beach soccer team =

National sports team

Georgia
- Association: Georgian Football Federation
- Confederation: UEFA (Europe)
- Head coach: Jaba Tchanturia
- FIFA code: GEO
- BSWW ranking: 59 ▲2 (2 June 2025)
First colours
Second colours

First international
- Georgia 3–15 Portugal (Benidorm, Spain; 11 May 2008)

Biggest win
- Georgia 6–3 Norway (Nazaré, Portugal; 6 July 2019)

Biggest defeat
- Georgia 3–15 Portugal (Benidorm, Spain; 11 May 2008)

The Georgian national beach soccer team represents Georgia in international beach soccer competitions and is controlled by the Georgian Football Federation, the governing body for football in Georgia. The team has played competitively in two World Cup qualifiers, in 2008 and 2016, but have yet to win a match. The majority of the current squad also plays for club team FC Dinamo Batumi in Georgia who have competed in the Euro Winners Cup.

== Current squad ==
Current as of July 2024

Note: Flags indicate national team as defined under FIFA eligibility rules; some limited exceptions apply. Players may hold more than one non-FIFA nationality.

| No. | Pos. | Nation | Player |
|---|---|---|---|
| 22 | GK | GEO | Vakhtang Terunashvili |
| 3 | DF | GEO | Gocha Beridze |
| 3 | DF | GEO | Spartak Lomidze |
| 4 | DF | GEO | Giorgi Diakvnishvili |
| 5 | DF | GEO | David Diakvnishvili |

| No. | Pos. | Nation | Player |
|---|---|---|---|
| 7 | FW | GEO | Malkhaz Shamiladze |
| 8 | DF | GEO | Levan Partenadze |
| 9 | DF | GEO | Giorgi Tchviritdze |
| 10 | FW | GEO | Zurabi Shamiladze |
| 11 | FW | GEO | Giorgi Diakvnishvili |
| 13 | GK | GEO | Zurab Borchashvili |
| 17 | FW | GEO | Guladi Kokoladze |
| 20 | DF | GEO | Giorgi Ivaniadze |
| 21 | DF | GEO | Kakhi Todadze |

Coach: Kakhi Todadze

== Competitive record ==
=== FIFA Beach Soccer World Cup qualification (UEFA) ===
| Year | Pos | Round | Pld | W | W+ | L | GF | GA | GD |
|---|---|---|---|---|---|---|---|---|---|
| Spain 2008 | 24th | Group Stage | 3 | 0 | 0 | 3 | 4 | 26 | –22 |
| Spain 2009 | Did not enter | | | | | | | | |
| Italy 2011 | Did not enter | | | | | | | | |
| (Russia) Moscow 2013 | Did not enter | | | | | | | | |
| Italy 2015 | Withdrew | | | | | | | | |
| Italy 2017 | 17th | Group Stage | 2 | 0 | 0 | 2 | 9 | 15 | –6 |
| Russia 2019 | Did not enter | | | | | | | | |
| Portugal 2021 | Did not enter | | | | | | | | |
| Azerbaijan 2023 | Did not enter | | | | | | | | |
| Spain 2025 | 18th | Group Stage | 3 | 0 | 0 | 3 | 5 | 23 | –18 |
| Total | 0 titles | 3/10 | 8 | 0 | 0 | 8 | 18 | 64 | –46 |

== Achievements ==
- 2008 Season
  - 2008 FIFA Beach Soccer World Cup qualification
    - Group Stage
- 2016 Season
  - 2017 FIFA Beach Soccer World Cup qualification
    - Group Stage (T17th)

== Sources ==
- (in Russian) Team profile on Beach Soccer Russia
- Team profile at Beach Soccer Worldwide
