= Szymon Gąsiński =

Polish footballer

Personal information
- Full name: Szymon Gąsiński
- Date of birth: 8 July 1983 (age 43)
- Place of birth: Łódź, Poland
- Height: 1.91 m (6 ft 3 in)
- Position: Goalkeeper

Youth career
- ŁKS Łódź
- UKS SMS Łódź

Senior career*
Years	Team	Apps	(Gls)
2002–2005	Górnik Łęczyca		
2006–2007	Zagłębie Sosnowiec	24	(0)
2008	Mo IL		
2009	Concordia Piotrków Trybunalski	10	(0)
2010	Polonia Bytom	12	(0)
2011–2012	Cracovia	2	(0)
2013	Zawisza Rzgów	15	(0)
2013	Flota Świnoujście	15	(0)
2014–2015	ŁKS Łódź	17	(0)
2015	Zagłębie Sosnowiec	12	(0)
2016	Ner Poddębice		

International career
- Poland (beach soccer)
- * Club domestic league appearances and goals

Szymon Gąsiński (born 8 July 1983) is a Polish beach soccer player and former professional football player who plays as a goalkeeper. He has represented the Poland national beach soccer team.

== Career ==
=== Club ===
In January 2011, he joined Cracovia on a two-year contract.
