= Latvia national beach soccer team =

National sports team

Latvia
- Nickname: Sarkanbaltsarkanie (Red-white-red)
- Association: Latvian Football Federation
- Confederation: UEFA (Europe)
- Head coach: Valts Būmanis
- FIFA code: LVA
- BSWW ranking: 79 ▼3 (2 June 2025)
First colours
Second colours

The Latvia national beach soccer team represents Latvia in international beach soccer competitions and is controlled by the LFF, the governing body for football in Latvia.

== Current squad ==
Note: Flags indicate national team as defined under FIFA eligibility rules; some limited exceptions apply. Players may hold more than one non-FIFA nationality.

No.	Pos.	Nation	Player
1	GK		Aigars Bondars
2	DF		Ģirts Paulis
5	FW		Valdis Veinbergs
7	DF		Gatis Rožkalns
10	FW		Dāvids Vecaukums

Coach: Valts Būmanis
