= Serbia national beach soccer team =

Serbia
- Nickname: Eagles
- Association: Football Association of Serbia
- Confederation: UEFA (Europe)
- Head coach: Dejan Knežević
- Captain: Nikola Mijailović
- Most caps: Filip Antić (7)
- Top scorer: Nemanja Vučićević (8)
- FIFA code: SRB
- BSWW ranking: 72
First colours
Second colours

First international
- Serbia 0–6 Hungary (Belgrade, Serbia; 24 June 2016)

Biggest win
- Serbia 4–2 Czech Republic (Belgrade, Serbia; 24 July 2016)

Biggest defeat
- Spain 11–1 Serbia (Belgrade, Serbia; 26 June 2016)

The Serbia national beach soccer team represents Serbia in international beach soccer competitions and is controlled by the Football Association of Serbia, the governing body for football in Serbia. Team Serbia made a debut at the 2016 Euro Beach Soccer Cup, taking place in Serbian capital of Belgrade, losing in the quarterfinal to Hungary, 0–6.

== Current squad ==
Current as of June 2016

Note: Flags indicate national team as defined under FIFA eligibility rules; some limited exceptions apply. Players may hold more than one non-FIFA nationality.

No.	Pos.	Nation	Player
1	GK	SRB	Marko Milivojević
2	MF	SRB	Nemanja Filimonović
3	DF	SRB	Filip Antić
5	DF	SRB	Nikola Mijailović
6	MF	SRB	Nikola Valentić

No.	Pos.	Nation	Player
7	MF	SRB	Nikola Čubrilović
8	MF	SRB	Marko Lazić
9	FW	SRB	Mladen Jovančić
10	FW	SRB	Mihailo Jovanović
11	DF	SRB	Nemanja Vučićević
12	GK	SRB	Mihailo Pantelić

Coach: Dejan Knežević

== Competitive record ==
=== FIFA Beach Soccer World Cup qualification (UEFA) ===
Year	Round	Pos	Pld	W	W aet/pso	L	GF	GA	GD
2005	did not enter								
2006	did not enter								
2007	did not enter								
Spain 2008	did not enter								
Spain 2009	did not enter								
Italy 2011	did not enter								
(Russia) Moscow 2013	did not enter								
Italy 2015	did not enter								
Italy 2017	Group Stage	17	3	0	0	3	5	25	–20
Russia 2019	did not enter								
Portugal 2021	did not enter								
Azerbaijan 2023	did not enter								
Total	0 Title	1/9	3	0	0	3	5	25	–20

=== Euro Beach Soccer Cup ===
Year	Round	Pos	Pld	W	W aet/pso	L	GF	GA	GD
Italy 1998	did not enter								
Spain 1999	did not enter								
Spain 2001	did not enter								
Spain 2002	did not enter								
Belgium 2003	did not enter								
Portugal 2004	did not enter								
Russia 2005	did not enter								
Italy 2006	did not enter								
Spain 2007	did not enter								
Azerbaijan 2008	did not enter								
Italy 2009	did not enter								
Italy 2010	did not enter								
Russia 2012	did not enter								
Azerbaijan 2014	did not enter								
Serbia 2016	8th Ranked	8	3	0	0	3	2	23	–21
Total	0 Titles	1/15	3	0	0	3	2	23	–21

=== Euro Beach Soccer League ===
Year	Division	Result	Pld	W	W+	L	GF	GA	GD	Superfinal?
1998	did not enter									
1999	did not enter									
2000	did not enter									
2001	did not enter									
2002	did not enter									
2003	did not enter									
2004	did not enter									
2005	did not enter									
2006	did not enter									
2007	did not enter									
2008	did not enter									
2009	did not enter									
2010	did not enter									
2011	did not enter									
2012	did not enter									
2013	did not enter									
2014	did not enter									
2015	did not enter									
2016	B	9th place/14	3	1	0	2	12	17	–5	No
2017	B	9th place/14	3	1	0	2	13	12	+1	No
2018	B									No
Total	n/a	2/19	6	2	0	4	25	29	−3	0/2

== Achievements ==
- 2016 Season
  - Euro Beach Soccer Cup debut
