= 2016 Euro Beach Soccer Cup =

Tournament details
- Host country: Serbia
- Dates: 24 - 26 June
- Teams: 8 (from 1 confederation)
- Venue: 1 (in 1 host city)

Final positions
- Champions: Portugal (7th title)
- Runners-up: Italy
- Third place: Russia
- Fourth place: Hungary

Tournament statistics
- Matches played: 12
- Goals scored: 97 (8.08 per match)

The 2016 Euro Beach Soccer Cup was the fifteenth edition of the Euro Beach Soccer Cup, one of Europe's main, regular international beach soccer championships, organised every two years by Beach Soccer Worldwide (BSWW). It was held in June 2016, in Belgrade, Serbia, the first time the country has hosted and played in a BSWW sanctioned event.

Eight nations took part which were the best nations in Europe based on their finish in last years 2015 Euro Beach Soccer League, plus hosts Serbia. France, however, pulled out and were replaced by Hungary. The competition reverted to being a straight knock-out tournament instead of involving a group stage first as in the previous edition in 2014, with classifying matches to determine the final standings of those who didn't reach the final.

Spain were the defending champions, accepting the invitation to play, but lost in the quarter-finals, ultimately finishing seventh.

Portugal won the championship, claiming their seventh crown, their first in 10 years. Italy reached their first final, finishing as runners-up.

== Participating teams ==
The following teams took part in the tournament.

Team	2015 EBSL finish	Participation	Previous^{1}	Euro ranking
Serbia*	– (n/a)	1st	– (n/a)	– (n/a)
Spain	Division A, 4th	15th	(1998, **1999**, 2001, 2002, 2003, 2004, 2005, 2006, 2007, **2008**, **2009**, 2010, 2012, **2014**)	5th
Italy	Division A, 5th	14th	(1998, 1999, 2001, 2002, 2003, 2004, 2005, 2006, 2007, 2008, 2009, 2010, 2012)	3rd
Switzerland	Division A, 6th	14th	(1998, 2001, 2002, 2003, 2004, **2005**, 2006, 2007, 2008, 2009, 2010, 2012, 2014)	4th
Russia	Division A, 3rd	6th	(2005, 2009, **2010**, **2012**, 2014)	1st
Portugal	Division A, 1st (2015 EBSL Champions)	13th	(**1998**, 1999, **2001**, **2002**, **2003**, **2004**, 2005, **2006**, 2007, 2009, 2010, 2012)	2nd
Hungary	Division A, 12th (relegated)	5th	(2006, 2009, 2012, 2014)	7th
Ukraine	Division A, 2nd	3rd	(2005, **2007**)	6th

Bold indicates champion for that year. Italic indicates host for that year.
* = hosts of this year
^{1}Note: 1998-2010 annual basis (excluding 2000), biennial basis post-2010.

== Results ==
All times are CEST (UTC+2)

Main tournament bracket

Quarter-finals
24 June 2016
Serbia	0
Hungary	6
24 June 2016
Italy	3
Switzerland	2
24 June 2016
Russia	3
Ukraine	2
24 June 2016
Portugal	4
Spain	2

Semi-finals
25 June 2016
Hungary	3
Italy	7
25 June 2016
Russia	4 (0)
Portugal	4 (2)

Final
26 June 2016
Italy	3
Portugal	6
Third place
26 June 2016
Russia	8
Hungary	0

Classification matches

Classifying semi-finals
QF1	Serbia	1
QF2	Switzerland	6
QF3	Ukraine	7
QF4	Spain	3

Fifth place play-off
Switzerland	5
Ukraine	6
Seventh place play-off
Serbia	1
Spain	11

=== Quarter-finals ===
The winners proceeded on in the main tournament into the semi-finals. The losers progressed into a series of classifying matches to determine the standings of fifth down to eighth place.

24 June 2016
14:45

Italy	3–2	Switzerland

24 June 2016
16:00

Portugal	4–2	Spain

24 June 2016
17:15

Russia	3–2	Ukraine

24 June 2016
19:00

Serbia	0–6	Hungary

=== Semi-finals ===
==== Main tournament ====
25 June 2016
16:45

Hungary	2–7	Italy

25 June 2016
18:00

Russia	4–4 (a.e.t.)	Portugal
Penalties
	0–2

==== Classification (5th to 8th place) ====
25 June 2016
14:15

Ukraine	7–3	Spain

25 June 2016
18:00

Serbia	1–6	Switzerland

=== Seventh place play-off ===
The losers of the classifying semi finals contested 7th place.

26 June 2016
16:45

Serbia	1–11	Spain

=== Fifth place play-off ===
The winners of the classifying semi finals contested 5th place.

26 June 2016
14:15

Ukraine	6–5	Switzerland

=== Third place play-off ===
The losers of the main tournament semi finals contested 3rd place.

26 June 2016
16:45

Russia	8–0	Hungary

=== Final ===
The winners of the main tournament semi finals contested the championship final.

26 June 2016
18:00

Portugal	6–3	Italy

==== Winners ====
2016 Euro Beach Soccer Cup
champions

Portugal
Seventh title

== Awards ==
Top scorer
(Italy) Gabriele Gori
6 goals
Best player
(Portugal) Elinton Andrade
Best goalkeeper
(Portugal) Elinton Andrade

== Final standings ==
Pos	Team	Pld	W	W+	L	GF	GA	GD	Pts	Final result
1	Portugal	3	2	1	0	14	9	+5	8	Champions
2	Italy	3	2	0	1	13	11	+2	6	Second place
3	Russia	3	2	0	1	15	6	+9	6	Third place
4	Hungary	3	1	0	2	9	15	−6	3	Fourth place
5	Ukraine	3	2	0	1	15	11	+4	6	Fifth place
6	Switzerland	3	1	0	2	13	10	+3	3	Sixth place
7	Spain	3	1	0	2	16	12	+4	3	Seventh place
8	Serbia	3	0	0	3	2	23	−21	0	Eighth place

Source: Standings, BSWW
