= 2014 Euro Beach Soccer Cup =

Tournament details
- Host country: Azerbaijan
- Dates: 28–31 August
- Teams: 6 (from 1 confederation)
- Venue(s): 1 (in 1 host city)

Final positions
- Champions: Spain (4th title)
- Runners-up: Switzerland
- Third place: Russia
- Fourth place: Hungary

Tournament statistics
- Matches played: 9
- Goals scored: 86 (9.56 per match)
- Top scorer(s): (Switzerland) Noel Ott (11 goals)
- Best player(s): (Spain) Juanma

The 2014 Euro Beach Soccer Cup was the fourteenth edition of the Euro Beach Soccer Cup, one of Europe's main, regular international beach soccer championships organised every two years by Beach Soccer Worldwide (BSWW), held in August 2014, in Baku, Azerbaijan.

Just six nations took part as in 2008, compared to the usual eight, and the teams were not the top-ranked nations from the preceding Euro Beach Soccer League season as in the past but a mix of teams from the divisions as listed below. The competition started with a round-robin ground stage for only the third time, instead of a straight knock-out tournament, with the top two nations from the groups competing in a final match for the title, the others in the respective positions in their groups playing for third and fifth place in classifying matches to determine the final standings.

Spain won the championship for the fourth time, their third win in their last five appearances and their fourth title overall.

== Participating teams ==
The teams were announced on August 7.

Team	2013 EBSL Finish	Participation	Previous^{1}
Azerbaijan*	Division B, 12th	2nd	(2008)
Greece	Division B, Runners-up	2nd	(2007)
Hungary	Division B, 3rd	4th	(2006, 2009, 2010)
Spain	Division A, 4th	14th	(1998, **1999**, 2001, 2002, 2003, 2004, 2005, 2006, 2007, **2008**, **2009**, 2010, 2012)
Switzerland	Division A, 3rd	13th	(1998, 2001, 2002, 2003, 2004, **2005**, 2006, 2007, 2008, 2009, 2010, 2012)
Russia	Division A, Champions (2013 EBSL Winners)	5th	(2005, 2009, **2010**, **2012)**

Bold indicates champion for that year. Italic indicates host for that year.
* = hosts of this year
^{1}Note: 1998-2010 annual basis (excluding 2000), biennial basis post-2010.

== Group stage ==
=== Group A ===
Pos	Team	Pld	W	W+	L	GF	GA	GD+/-	Pts	Qualification
1	Switzerland	2	2	0	0	15	9	+6	**6**	Advance to final
2	Greece	2	0	1	1	5	9	-4	**2**	Play-offs
3	Azerbaijan	2	0	0	2	11	13	-2	**0**	Play-offs

28 August 2014
17:30

Switzerland	6–1	Greece
Mo; Borer; Ott; Stankovic; Spacca	Report	Triantafyllidis

29 August 2014
18:45

Greece	4–3 (a.e.t.)	Azerbaijan
Triantifyllidis; Salapatas; Kakaroumpas	Report	Zeynal; Renat; Asif

30 August 2014
18:45

Azerbaijan	8–9	Switzerland
Asif; Zeynal; Sabir; Amid; Renat	Report	Ott; Spacca; Stankovic; Mo

=== Group B ===
Pos	Team	Pld	W	W+	L	GF	GA	GD+/-	Pts	Qualification
1	Spain	2	2	0	0	10	7	+3	**6**	Advance to final
2	Russia	2	1	0	1	7	7	0	**3**	Play-offs
3	Hungary	2	0	0	2	7	10	-3	**0**	Play-offs

28 August 2014
18:45

Spain	6–4	Hungary
Juanma; Pajon; Antonio; Kuman; Llorenç	Report	Fekete; Simonyi; Sebestyen

29 August 2014
17:30

Russia	4–3	Hungary
Makarov; Paporotnyi; Krutikov	Report	Abel; Simonyi

30 August 2014
17:30

Russia	3–4	Spain
Makarov; Krash	Report	Antonio; Chiky; Llorenç

== Classification matches ==
=== Fifth place play-off ===
31 August 2014
16:15

Azerbaijan	3–3 (a.e.t.)	Hungary
Jomard; Sabir	Report	Simonyi
Penalties
Zeynal (penalty missed); Asif (penalty scored); Sabir (penalty missed)	1-2	(penalty scored) Sebestyen; (penalty missed) Simonyi; (penalty scored) Abel

=== Third place play-off ===
31 August 2014
17:30

Russia	7–4	Greece
Krutikov; Romanov; Krash; Kotov	Report	Gkritzalis; Triantifyllidis; Amanatidis; Papastathopoulos

=== Final ===
31 August 2014
18:45

Spain	8–6	Switzerland
Llorenç; Juanma; Chyki	Report	Stankovic; Ott

==== Winners ====
2014 Euro Beach Soccer Cup
champions

**Spain**
**Fourth title**

== Awards ==
Top scorer
(Switzerland) Noel Ott
**11 goals**
Best player
(Spain) Juan Manuel Lima (Juanma)
Best goalkeeper
(Hungary) Dávid Ficsór

== Goalscorers ==
11 goals

- (Switzerland) Noel Ott

7 goals

- (Spain) Llorenç Gomez

5 goals

- (Switzerland) Dejan Stankovic
- (Hungary) Gábor Simonyi

4 goals

- (Greece) Theofilos Triantafyllidis
- (Azerbaijan) Asif Zeynalov
- (Azerbaijan) Sabir Allahguliyev

3 goals

- (Spain) Antonio Mayor Hernández
- (Spain) Juanma
- (Russia) Aleksei Krutikov
- (Russia) Yury Krasheninnikov

2 goals

- (Switzerland) Mo Jaeggy
- (Switzerland) Sandro Spaccarotella
- (Azerbaijan) Zeynal Zeynalov
- (Azerbaijan) Renat Sultanov
- (Spain) Daniel Pajón Gómez
- (Hungary) Viktor Fekete
- (Russia) Aleksey Makarov
- (Russia) Artur Paporotnyi
- (Hungary) Péter Ábel
- (Spain) Salavador Ardil 'Chyki'
- (Russia) Kirill Romanov
- (Russia) Yury Kotov

1 goal

- (Switzerland) Phillipp Borer
- (Greece) Christos Salapatas
- (Greece) Athanasios Kakaroumpas
- (Azerbaijan) Amid Nazarov
- (Spain) Miguel Santiso Mosquera 'Kuman'
- (Hungary) Norbert Sebestyen
- (Azerbaijan) Jomard Bakshaliyev
- (Greece) Spyridon-Evangelos Gkritzalis-Papadopoulos
- (Greece) Stavros Amanatidis
- (Greece) Konstantinos Papastathopoulos

== Final standings ==
Pos	Grp	Team	Pld	W	W+	L	GF	GA	GD	Pts	Final result
1	B	Spain	3	3	0	0	18	13	+5	9	Champions
2	A	Switzerland	3	2	0	1	21	17	+4	6	Runners-up
3	B	Russia	3	2	0	1	14	11	+3	6	Third place
4	A	Greece	3	0	1	2	9	16	−7	2	Fourth place
5	B	Hungary	3	0	1	2	10	13	−3	2	Fifth place
6	A	Azerbaijan	3	0	0	3	14	16	−2	0	Sixth place

Source: Standings, BSWW
