= Azerbaijan national beach soccer team =

Azerbaijan
- Nickname(s): Odlar Yurdu (The Land of Fire)
- Association: AFFA
- Confederation: UEFA (Europe)
- Head coach: Zeynal Zeynalov
- Most caps: Amid Nazarov; Asif Zeynalov (79)
- Top scorer: Sabir Allahguliyev (74)
- Home stadium: Baku, Azerbaijan
- FIFA code: AZE
- BSWW ranking: 34 (2 June 2025)
First colours
Second colours
Third colours

First international
- Azerbaijan 6–4 Germany (Minehead, Great Britain; 17 July 2009)

Biggest win
- Azerbaijan 8–1 Furjan (Dubai, United Arab Emirates; March 2009); Azerbaijan 9–2 Kazakhstan (Bibione, Italy; 13 July 2010)

Biggest defeat
- Poland 13–3 Azerbaijan (Moscow, Russia; 27 July 2019)

Euro Beach Soccer Cup
- Appearances: 2 (first in 2008)
- Best result: Third place (2008)

European Games
- Appearances: 2 (first in 2015)
- Best result: 8th Place

Euro Beach Soccer League
- Appearances: 12 (first in 2009)
- Best result: 8th Place

The Azerbaijan national beach soccer team represents Azerbaijan in international beach soccer competitions and is controlled by the AFFA, the governing body for football in Azerbaijan. The current coach of the team is Zeynal Zeynalov. Farid Novruzi is the President of BSFF.

== Tournament records ==
=== Beach Soccer World Championships ===
Beach Soccer World Championships
Year	Round	Pld	W	WE	WP	L	GS	GA	Dif	Pts
(Brazil) 1995	Did not enter	-	-	-	-	-	-	-	-	-
(Brazil) 1996	Did not enter	-	-	-	-	-	-	-	-	-
(Brazil) 1997	Did not enter	-	-	-	-	-	-	-	-	-
(Brazil) 1998	Did not enter	-	-	-	-	-	-	-	-	
(Brazil) 1999	Did not enter	-	-	-	-	-	-	-	-	-
(Brazil) 2000	Did not enter	-	-	-	-	-	-	-	-	-
(Brazil) 2001	Did not enter	-	-	-	-	-	-	-	-	-
(Brazil) 2002	Did not enter	-	-	-	-	-	-	-	-	-
(Brazil) 2003	Did not enter	-	-	-	-	-	-	-	-	-
(Brazil) 2004	Did not enter	-	-	-	-	-	-	-	-	-
Total	0/10	0	0	0	0	0	0	0	0	0

FIFA Beach Soccer World Cup
Year	Round	Pld	W	WE	WP	L	GS	GA	Dif	Pts
(Brazil) 2005	Did not qualify	-	-	-	-	-	-	-	-	-
(Brazil) 2006	Did not qualify	-	-	-	-	-	-	-	-	-
(Brazil) 2007	Did not qualify	-	-	-	-	-	-	-	-	-
(France) 2008	Did not qualify	-	-	-	-	-	-	-	-	-
(United Arab Emirates) 2009	Did not qualify	-	-	-	-	-	-	-	-	-
(Italy) 2011	Did not qualify	-	-	-	-	-	-	-	-	-
(French Polynesia) 2013	Did not qualify	-	-	-	-	-	-	-	-	-
(Portugal) 2015	Did not qualify	-	-	-	-	-	-	-	-	-
(The Bahamas) 2017	Did not qualify	-	-	-	-	-	-	-	-	-
(Paraguay) 2019	Did not qualify	-	-	-	-	-	-	-	-	-
(Russia) 2021	Did not qualify	-	-	-	-	-	-	-	-	-
(United Arab Emirates) 2023	Did not qualify	-	-	-	-	-	-	-	-	-
(Seychelles) 2025	Did not qualify	-	-	-	-	-	-	-	-	-
Total	0/13	0	0	0	0	0	0	0	0	0

=== FIFA Beach Soccer World Cup Qualification (UEFA) ===
FIFA Beach Soccer World Cup Qualification Record
Year	Round	Pld	W	WE	WP	L	GS	GA	Dif	Pts
(Spain) 2008	Round 1	-	-	-	-	-	-	-	-	-
(Spain) 2009	8th Place	-	-	-	-	-	-	-	-	-
(Italy) 2011	Round of 16	-	-	-	-	-	-	-	-	-
(Russia) 2013	Round of 16	-	-	-	-	-	-	-	-	-
(Italy) 2015	13th Place	-	-	-	-	-	-	-	-	-
(Italy) 2017	8th Place	-	-	-	-	-	-	-	-	-
(Russia) 2019	8th Place	-	-	-	-	-	-	-	-	-
(Portugal) 2021	8th Place	-	-	-	-	-	-	-	-	-
(Azerbaijan) 2023	13th Place	-	-	-	-	-	-	-	-	-
(Spain) 2025	Round of 16	-	-	-	-	-	-	-	-	-
Total	10/10	-	-	-	-	-	-	-	-	-

=== Euro Beach Soccer Cup ===
Euro Beach Soccer Cup Record
Year	Round	Pld	W	WE	WP	L	GS	GA	Dif	Pts
(Italy) 1998	Did not enter	-	-	-	-	-	-	-	-	-
(Spain) 1999	Did not enter	-	-	-	-	-	-	-	-	-
(Spain) 2001	Did not enter	-	-	-	-	-	-	-	-	-
(Spain) 2002	Did not enter	-	-	-	-	-	-	-	-	-
(Belgium) 2003	Did not enter	-	-	-	-	-	-	-	-	-
(Portugal) 2004	Did not enter	-	-	-	-	-	-	-	-	-
(Russia) 2005	Did not enter	-	-	-	-	-	-	-	-	-
(Italy) 2006	Did not enter	-	-	-	-	-	-	-	-	-
(Spain) 2007	Did not enter	-	-	-	-	-	-	-	-	-
(Azerbaijan) 2008	Third Place	-	-	-	-	-	-	-	-	-
(Italy) 2009	Did not enter	-	-	-	-	-	-	-	-	-
(Italy) 2010	Did not enter	-	-	-	-	-	-	-	-	-
(Russia) 2012	Did not enter	-	-	-	-	-	-	-	-	-
(Azerbaijan) 2014	6th Place	-	-	-	-	-	-	-	-	-
(Serbia) 2016	Did not enter	-	-	-	-	-	-	-	-	-
Total	2/15	-	-	-	-	-	-	-	-	-

=== Euro Beach Soccer League ===
- Euro Beach Soccer League

=== Pro Beach Soccer Tour ===
- Pro Beach Soccer Tour

=== Beach Soccer Intercontinental Cup ===
Beach Soccer Intercontinental Cup
Year	Round	Pld	W	WE	WP	L	GS	GA	Dif	Pts
(United Arab Emirates) 2011	Did Not Enter	–	–	–	–	–	–	–	–	–
(United Arab Emirates) 2012	Did Not Enter	–	–	–	–	–	–	–	–	–
(United Arab Emirates) 2013	Did Not Enter	–	–	–	–	–	–	–	–	–
(United Arab Emirates) 2014	Did Not Enter	–	–	–	–	–	–	–	–	–
(United Arab Emirates) 2015	Did Not Enter	–	–	–	–	–	–	–	–	–
(United Arab Emirates) 2016	Did Not Enter	–	–	–	–	–	–	–	–	–
Total	0/6	–	–	–	–	–	–	–	–	–

=== BSWW Mundialito ===
BSWW Mundialito Record
Year	Round	Pld	W	WE	WP	L	GS	GA	Dif	Pts
(Brazil) 1994 to 2016	Did Not Enter	–	–	–	–	–	–	–	–	–
Total	0/20	–	–	–	–	–	–	–	–	–

=== European Games ===
European Games Record
Year	Round	Pld	W	WE	WP	L	GS	GA	Dif	Pts
(Azerbaijan) 2015	8th Place	5	0	0	0	5	12	22	-10	0
(Belarus) 2019	did not qualify									
(Poland) 2023	qualified									
Total	2/3	5	0	0	0	5	12	22	-10	0

== Current squad ==
Correct as of July 2012:

Note: Flags indicate national team as defined under FIFA eligibility rules; some limited exceptions apply. Players may hold more than one non-FIFA nationality.

No.	Pos.	Nation	Player
1	GK	AZE	Emin Kurdov
2	DF	AZE	Elvin Guliyev
4	DF	AZE	Ramin Guliyev
7	MF	AZE	Abbas Zeynalov
8	MF	AZE	Nahid Mehraliyev
9	MF	AZE	Abdul Aliyev
10	FW	AZE	Elhad Guliyev (captain)

No.	Pos.	Nation	Player
11	FW	AZE	Orkhan Mammadov
14	DF	AZE	Vitaliy Borisov
17	FW	AZE	Elhagi Akhmadov
18	DF	AZE	Jomard Bakhshaliyev
20	FW	AZE	Asif Zeynalov
12	GK	AZE	Vaqif Şirinbəyov

Coach: Bahram Hatamov

== Achievements ==
- 2008 Season
  - Euro Beach Soccer Cup, Baku, Azerbaijan: 3rd Place
- 2015 Season
  - European Games: 8th Place
- 2018 Season
  - Euro Beach Soccer League: 8th Place
