= Anton Shkarin =

Russian beach soccer player

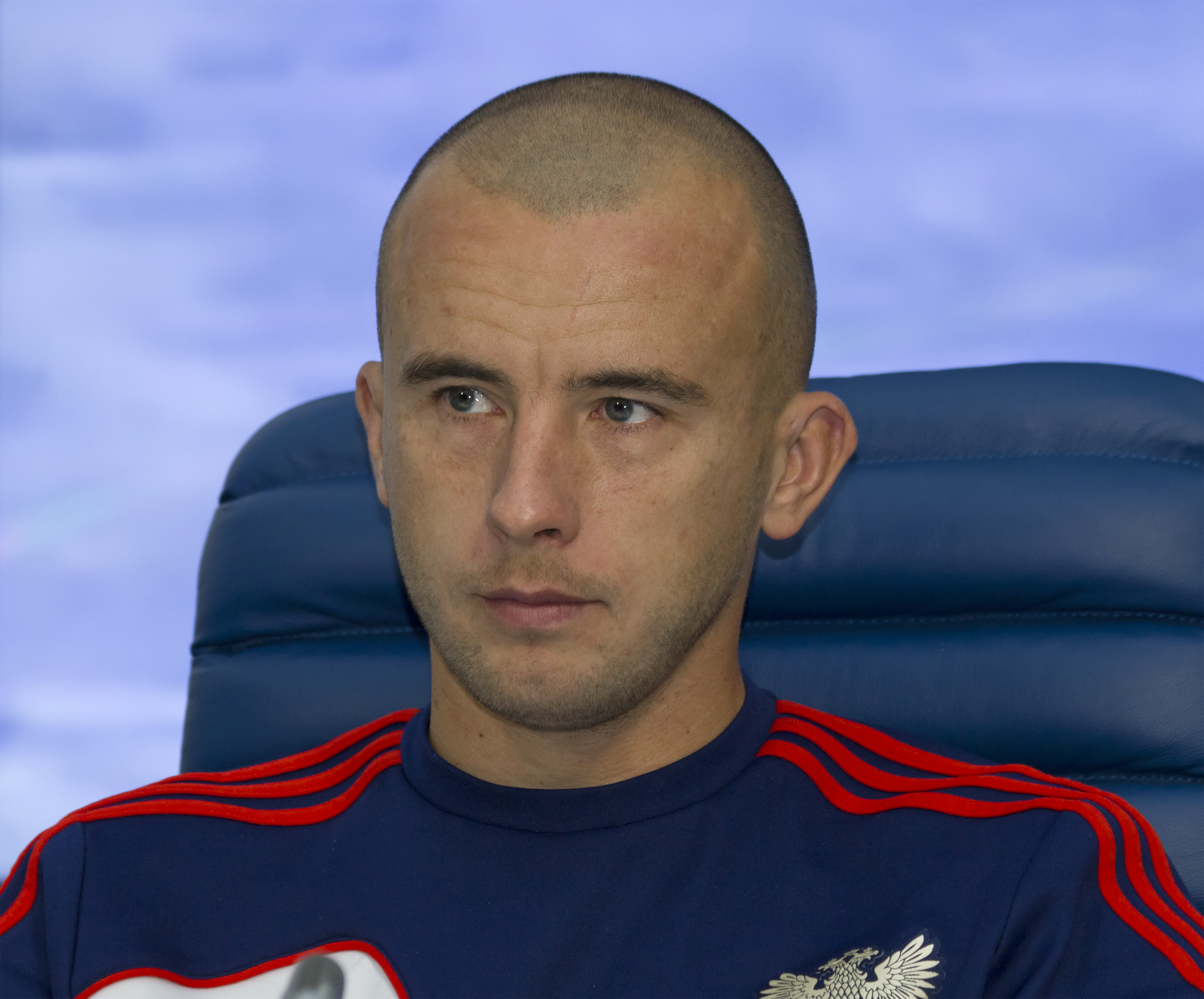
- Shkarin in an ITAR-TASS press conference, September 2013

Personal information
- Full name: Anton Pavlovich Shkarin
- Date of birth: 15 November 1982
- Place of birth: Gizhiga, Magadan Oblast, Soviet Union
- Position: Defender

Team information
- Current team: Krylya Sovetov Samara
- Number: 2

Senior career*
Years	Team	Apps	(Gls)
2005	Siti Khimik	5	(0)
2006–2009	Strogino	30	(5)
2010	Delta Saratov	5	(3)
2010–2018	Lokomotiv Moscow	243	(62)
2018–	Spartak Moscow	90	(14)
2018–	Krylya Sovetov Samara	1	(0)

International career^{‡}
2005–	Russia national beach soccer team	285	(64)
- * Club domestic league appearances and goals as of 20:28, 13 July 2021 (UTC) ‡ National team caps and goals as of 20:28, 13 July 2021 (UTC)

Medal record

Beach soccer

Representing Russia

FIFA Beach Soccer World Cup
Gold medal – first place	2011 Ravenna	
Gold medal – first place	2013 Papeete	
Gold medal – first place	2021 Moscow	
Bronze medal – third place	2015 Espinho	
Bronze medal – third place	2019 Luque	

Beach Soccer Intercontinental Cup
Gold medal – first place	2011 Dubai	
Gold medal – first place	2012 Dubai	
Silver medal – second place	2013 Dubai	
Silver medal – second place	2014 Dubai	
Gold medal – first place	2015 Dubai	

European Games
Gold medal – first place	2015 Baku	Team

Euro Beach Soccer Cup
Gold medal – first place	2010 Rome	
Gold medal – first place	2012 Moscow	
Bronze medal – third place	2016 Belgrade	

Anton Pavlovich Shkarin (Russian: Антон Павлович Шкарин; born 15 November 1982) is a Russian beach soccer player who currently plays as defender for Krylya Sovetov Samara.

== Career ==
Shkarin began his beach soccer career at Spartak-Shchyolkovo before spending three more seasons at another local club, FC Strogino, and then moving to Lokomotive Moscow in 2010. He debuted for the national team at the 2005 Euro Beach Soccer Cup.

In the 2013 FIFA Beach Soccer World Cup Final, Shkarin scored the first goal against Spain and helped his team win 5-1.

In December 2018, Shkarin switched to Spartak Moscow. For Lokomotive he scored 62 goals in a record 243 appearances.

In 2019, Anton Shkarin, Artur Paporotnyi, Maxim Chuzhkov and Yuri Krashennikov scored a goal each at the 2019 FIFA Beach Soccer World Cup bringing the score 7–1 against Italy.

== Personal life ==
Shkarin enrolled at the MGSU as a structural architect.

On 8 July 2012, Shkarin made an offer to his girl Marina on the beach field after the match against Spain. They then married and she gave birth to Pavel. Shkarin lives in Fryazino.

== Achievements ==
=== National team ===
- FIFA Beach Soccer World Cup champion: 2011, 2013, 2021
- Beach Soccer Intercontinental Cup champion: 2011, 2012, 2015
- Euro Beach Soccer Cup champion: 2010, 2012
- Euro Beach Soccer League champion: 2009, 2011, 2013, 2014, 2017

=== Clubs ===
- Russian National champion: 2005, 2008, 2009, 2010, 2011, 2012, 2017
- Russian Cup champion: 2008, 2009, 2011, 2012, 2013, 2016
- Russian Super Cup: 2011

=== Individually ===
- Merited Master of Sports (21 December 2012)
