= Euro Beach Soccer Cup =

- Organiser(s): BSWW
- Founded: 1998
- Abolished: 2016
- Region: Europe (UEFA)
- Teams: 8
- Last champions: Portugal (7th title)
- Most championships: Portugal (7 titles)

The Euro Beach Soccer Cup (EBSC), originally known as the European Pro Beach Soccer Championships until 2004, was a biennial (previously annual) beach soccer competition contested between European men's national teams, organised by Beach Soccer Worldwide (BSWW). Having started in 1998, the tournament was one of the oldest and longest running beach soccer competitions in Europe and the world. It is currently merged with Euro Beach Soccer League.

== History ==
Historically, the top eight ranking teams from the previous Euro Beach Soccer League qualified to contest the cup, hence the similar naming, with the first edition in 1998 starting off the back of the first EBSL season earlier in the year. However, due to saturation in the calendar in recent years, the once major championship has been somewhat back-benched. The participating teams are not always the best ranked as in the past (notably in 2008 and 2014), with entry requirements being more lax/down to invitation, and the tournament has been moved to every two years, the last annual edition coming in 2010.

Portugal are the most successful team and the current champions, having won the tournament for the seventh time in 2016 having failed to win since 2006.

The cup is played as a straight knock-out tournament, other than in the 1998, 2008 and 2014 editions when a group stage was used first before a set of knock-out rounds.

In 2016, BSWW began a women's edition of the event, to be hosted annually.

== Men's tournaments ==
=== Results ===
Year	Location	Final			Third place play-off			Awards		
Year	Location	Winners	Score	Runners-up	Third place	Score	Fourth place	Top Scorer	Best Player	Best Goalkeeper
1998; Details	Siracusa, Italy	Portugal	3–2	Spain	Italy	11–4	Germany	(Portugal) Alan	(Portugal) Alan	(Switzerland) Thomas Gruetter
1999; Details	Alicante, Spain	Spain	6–2	Portugal	France	8–7	Italy	—		
2001; Details	Maspalomas, Spain	Portugal	4–3	Spain	Italy	5–4	Germany	(Italy) Marco Bruschini	(Portugal) Madjer	(Spain) Roberto Valeiro
2002; Details	Barcelona, Spain	Portugal	2–1	Spain	France	9–6	Italy	(Spain) Ramiro Amarelle	(Portugal) Madjer	(Germany) Jürgen Rollmann
2003; Details	Liège, Belgium	Portugal	6–3	France	Spain	6–3	Germany	(Italy) Massimo Agostini	(Portugal) Hernâni	(France) Claude Barrabe
2004; Details	Lisbon, Portugal	Portugal	8–3	Spain	Italy	9–9 a.e.t. (4–3) pen.	France	(Portugal) Madjer	(Portugal) Madjer	(Portugal) João Carlos
2005; Details	Moscow, Russia	Switzerland	4–3	Russia	Portugal	5–4	Ukraine	(Italy) Pasquale Carotenuto	(Russia) Andrey Bukhlitskiy	(Switzerland) Nico Jung
2006; Details	Naples, Italy	Portugal	9–8	France	Italy	6–4	Switzerland	(Italy) Pasquale Carotenuto	(Italy) Pasquale Carotenuto	(France) Christophe Eggimann
2007; Details	Tarragona, Spain	Ukraine	3–0	France	Portugal	2–1	Switzerland	(Switzerland) Dejan Stankovic	(France) Jérémy Basquaise	(Ukraine) Volodymyr Hladchenko
2008; Details	Baku, Azerbaijan	Spain	2–0	Switzerland	Azerbaijan	4–3	Norway	(Switzerland) Dejan Stankovic	(Spain) Nico	(Spain) Roberto Valeiro
2009; Details	Rome, Italy	Spain	6–4	Switzerland	Portugal	7–5	Hungary	(Portugal) Madjer	(Spain) Nico	(Switzerland) Nico Jung
2010; Details	Rome, Italy	Russia	6–4	Portugal	Italy	5–4	Spain	(Portugal) Madjer	(Russia) Ilya Leonov	(Russia) Andrey Bukhlitskiy
2012; Details	Moscow, Russia	Russia	4–2	Portugal	Switzerland	5–4	Italy	(Portugal) Madjer (Switzerland) Dejan Stankovic (Italy) Giuseppe Soria	(Russia) Aleksey Makarov	(Russia) Andrey Bukhlitskiy
2014; Details	Baku, Azerbaijan	Spain	8–6	Switzerland	Russia	7–4	Greece	(Switzerland) Noel Ott	(Spain) Juanma	(Hungary) Dávid Ficsór
2016; Details	Belgrade, Serbia	Portugal	6–3	Italy	Russia	8–0	Hungary	(Italy) Gabriele Gori	(Portugal) Elinton Andrade	(Portugal) Elinton Andrade

=== Successful national teams ===
Team	Titles	Runners-up	Third place	Fourth place	Total Top four (from 15)
Portugal	7 (1998, 2001, 2002, 2003, 2004, 2006, 2016)	3 (1999, 2010, 2012)	3 (2005, 2007, 2009)	—	13
Spain	4 (1999, 2008, 2009, 2014)	4 (1998, 2001, 2002, 2004)	1 (2003)	1 (2010)	10
Russia	2 (2010, 2012)	1 (2005)	2 (2014, 2016)	—	5
Switzerland	1 (2005)	3 (2008, 2009, 2014)	1 (2012)	2 (2006, 2007)	7
Ukraine	1 (2007)	—	—	1 (2005)	2
France	—	3 (2003, 2006, 2007)	2 (1999, 2002)	1 (2004)	6
Italy	—	1 (2016)	5 (1998, 2001, 2004, 2006, 2010)	3 (1999, 2002, 2012)	9
Azerbaijan	—	—	1 (2008)	—	1
Germany	—	—	—	3 (1998, 2001, 2003)	3
Hungary	—	—	—	2 (2009, 2016)	2
Greece	—	—	—	1 (2014)	1
Norway	—	—	—	1 (2008)	1

=== Overall standings ===
As 2016

Pos	Team	Part	Pld	W	WE	WP	L	GF	GA	Dif	Pts
1	Portugal	13	42	31	2	3	6	237	146	+91	100
2	Spain	15	44	28	0	1	15	243	160	+83	85
3	Switzerland	14	42	18	0	2	22	203	198	+5	56
4	Italy	14	40	15	1	1	23	217	210	+7	48
5	France	12	35	15	1	1	18	181	197	–16	48
6	Russia	6	18	14	0	0	4	88	48	+40	42
7	Ukraine	3	9	6	0	0	3	41	31	+10	18
8	Poland	4	12	5	0	1	6	41	57	–16	16
9	Hungary	5	15	4	0	1	10	48	76	–28	13
10	England	3	9	4	0	0	5	31	37	–6	12
11	Germany	5	16	3	0	1	12	66	92	–26	10
12	Belgium	3	9	3	0	0	6	45	51	–6	9
13	Azerbaijan	2	6	2	0	0	4	21	25	–4	6
14	Norway	2	6	2	0	0	4	24	44	–20	6
15	Turkey	1	3	1	0	0	2	9	13	–4	3
16	Austria	2	6	1	0	0	5	23	47	–24	3
17	Greece	2	6	0	1	0	5	18	33	–15	2
18	Romania	1	3	0	0	0	3	6	15	–9	0
19	Netherlands	1	3	0	0	0	3	10	25	–15	0
20	Ireland	1	3	0	0	0	3	9	32	–23	0
21	Serbia	2	5	0	0	0	5	6	33	–27	0

Note: Win in Common Time W = 3 Points / Win in Extra Time WE = 2 Points / Win in Penalty shoot-out WP = 1 Point / Lose L = 0 Points

=== Team appearances ===
These are the nations who have appeared in the Euro Beach Soccer Cup since 1998.

Legend

- 1st – Champions
- 2nd – Runners-up
- 3rd – Third place
- 4th – Fourth place
- 5th − Fifth place
- 6th − Sixth place
- 7th − Seventh place
- 8th − Eighth place
- QF – Quarterfinals or seventh/eighth place
- R1 – Round 1 (group stage)
- • – Did not play
- – Hosts

	1998 (Italy) (7)	1999 (Spain) (4)	2001 (Spain) (8)	2002 (Spain) (8)	2003 (Belgium) (8)	2004 (Portugal) (8)	2005 (Russia) (8)	2006 (Italy) (8)	2007 (Spain) (8)	2008 (Azerbaijan) (6)	2009 (Italy) (8)	2010 (Italy) (8)	2012 (Russia) (8)	2014 (Azerbaijan) (6)	2016 (Serbia) (8)	Total Appearances
Azerbaijan	•	•	•	•	•	•	•	•	•	3rd	•	•	•	6th	•	2
Austria	•	•	•	•	QF	•	•	QF	•	•	•	•	•	•	•	2
Belgium	•	•	•	•	5th	QF	QF	•	•	•	•	•	•	•	•	3
England	•	•	•	5th	•	5th	•	•	•	6th	•	•	•	•	•	3
France	R1	4th	QF	3rd	2nd	4th	QF	2nd	2nd	•	6th	QF	QF	•	•	12
Germany	4th	•	4th	6th	4th	•	•	QF	•	•	•	•	•	•	•	5
Greece	•	•	•	•	•	•	•	•	QF	•	•	•	•	4th	•	2
Hungary	•	•	•	•	•	•	•	6th	•	•	4th	QF	•	5th	4th	5
Ireland	•	•	•	QF	•	•	•	•	•	•	•	•	•	•	•	1
Italy	3rd	3rd	3rd	4th	6th	3rd	6th	3rd	QF	5th	QF	3rd	4th	•	2nd	14
Netherlands	•	•	QF	•	•	•	•	•	•	•	•	•	•	•	•	1
Norway	•	•	•	•	•	6th	•	•	•	4th	•	•	•	•	•	2
Poland	•	•	•	•	•	•	•	•	5th	•	QF	6th	5th	•	•	4
Portugal	1st	2nd	1st	1st	1st	1st	3rd	1st	3rd	•	3rd	2nd	2nd	•	1st	13
Romania	•	•	•	•	•	•	•	•	•	•	•	•	QF	•	•	1
Russia	•	•	•	•	•	•	2nd	•	•	•	5th	1st	1st	3rd	3rd	6
Serbia ^{1}	R1	•	•	•	•	•	•	•	•	•	•	•	•	•	8th	2
Spain	2nd	1st	2nd	2nd	3rd	2nd	5th	5th	6th	1st	1st	4th	6th	1st	7th	15
Switzerland	R1	•	QF	QF	QF	QF	1st	4th	4th	2nd	2nd	5th	3rd	2nd	6th	14
Turkey	•	•	QF	•	•	•	•	•	•	•	•	•	•	•	•	1
Ukraine	•	•	•	•	•	•	4th	•	1st	•	•	•	•	•	5th	3

^{1} Includes one appearance as Yugoslavia

== Women's tournaments ==
=== Results ===
Year	Location	Final			Third place play-off			Awards		
Year	Location	Winners	Score	Runners-up	Third place	Score	Fourth place	Top Scorer	Best Player	Best Goalkeeper
2016; Details	Cascais, Portugal	Spain	2–1	Switzerland	Portugal	6–6 a.e.t. 2–0 pens.	England	(England) Molly Clark	(Spain) Andrea Mirón	(Switzerland) Suzanne Stutz
2017; Details	Nazaré, Portugal	England	4–3	Switzerland	Netherlands	1–0	Czechia	(England) Gemma Hillier	(Netherlands) Grytsje Van den Berg	(England) Lucy Quinn
2018; Details	Nazaré, Portugal	Russia	2–0	Spain	Switzerland	6–3	England	(Russia) Anastasia Gorshkova	(Russia) Marina Fedorova	(Spain) Maria Jose Pons
2019; Details	Nazaré, Portugal	Russia	3–2	Spain	Switzerland	6–5 a.e.t.	England	5 players	(Russia) Marina Fedorova	(Russia) Viktoriia Silina
2020	Nazaré, Portugal	Cancelled due to COVID-19 pandemic.								

=== Successful national teams ===
Team	Titles	Runners-up	Third place	Fourth place	Total top four (from 4)
Russia	2 (2018, 2019)	—	—	—	2
Spain	1 (2016)	2 (2018, 2019)	—	—	3
England	1 (2017)	—	—	3 (2016, 2018, 2019)	4
Switzerland	—	2 (2016, 2017)	2 (2018, 2019)	—	4
Portugal	—	—	1 (2016)	—	1
Netherlands	—	—	1 (2017)	—	1
Czech Republic	—	—	—	1 (2017)	1
