= 2008 Euro Beach Soccer League =

Tournament details
- Dates: 20 June – 24 August
- Teams: 17 (from 1 confederation)
- Venue(s): 3 (in 3 host cities)

Final positions
- Champions: Portugal (3rd title)
- Runners-up: Netherlands
- Third place: Russia
- Fourth place: Italy

Tournament statistics
- Matches played: 36
- Goals scored: 309 (8.58 per match)
- Top scorer(s): (Portugal) Madjer (11 goals)
- Best player(s): (Portugal) Madjer
- Best goalkeeper: (Netherlands) Ran Reijer

The 2008 Euro Beach Soccer League, was the eleventh edition of the Euro Beach Soccer League (EBSL), the premier beach soccer competition contested between European men's national teams, occurring annually since its establishment in 1998. The league was organised by Beach Soccer Worldwide (BSWW) between June 20 and August 24, 2008.

Unprecedented organisational changes had to be made to the EBSL in 2008 leading to a drastically shorter season than usual – just two regular season stages were scheduled due to a clash of dates with the arrangements of the 2008 FIFA Beach Soccer World Cup, the first edition to take place in Europe. As a result of the shorter season, BSWW also abandoned the concept of Divisions A and B, opting to have the teams compete in one collective division regardless of ability.

Portugal entered the tournament as defending champions and successfully retained their title, beating the Netherlands in the final to claim their third European crown. Portugal became only the second team after Spain to defend the EBSL crown as incumbent champions, after the Spanish did so twice in 2000 and 2001. The Netherlands, as runners-up, claimed their best finish and only top four placing to date.

This was the first time this decade that the league did not double as the European qualification process for the FIFA Beach Soccer World Cup. In 2008, a dedicated World Cup qualifying competition for UEFA nations was established, replacing the EBSL as the qualifying route for European teams from this year onward.

== Structural changes ==
BSWW were forced to make radical changes to the organisation of the 2008 EBSL season due to circumstances regarding the FIFA Beach Soccer World Cup:

Until 2007, the World Cup always took place in the Southern Hemisphere nation of Brazil, during the summer months of November to February. This left the European summer of June to September free for the EBSL to take place uninterrupted. However, in 2008, FIFA organised the first World Cup to take place outside Brazil, in France, during the Northern Hemisphere summer – right in the middle of the typical EBSL season. This greatly affected the scheduling of the EBSL as BSWW could not organise as many rounds of regular season fixtures as usual due to European teams in preparation for, participation in, and recovery from, the World Cup over the course of July and beginning of August.

This meant only two regular season stages were organised, considerably less than usual. To accommodate all teams in just two stages, the concept of Divisions A and B, in use since 2002, were also scrapped for this season – all participating nations of varying beach soccer abilities took part in one single division.

== Teams ==
17 teams took part this season, in one single division.

16 nations participated during the regular season; one set of eight in stage one and the remaining eight in stage two. The 17th nation, Portugal, were awarded a bye straight into the Superfinal as hosts.

The teams are listed below, showing at which stage of the competition they entered:

Stage 1

- Italy
- Spain
- Switzerland
- Poland
- Austria
- Greece
- Andorra
- Czech Republic

Stage 2

- France
- Russia
- Norway
- Turkey
- England
- Estonia
- Netherlands
- Hungary

Superfinal

- Portugal

== Regular season ==
=== Format ===
The formats of the two regular season stages were organised as unconventional double elimination tournaments as explained below.

- Eight teams took part in each stage, all starting in the quarter-finals.
- The winners of the quarter-finals proceeded to the winners' semi finals, whilst the losers of the quarter-finals receded to the losers' semi finals.
- The winners of the winners' semi finals moved on to the final to contest 1st and 2nd place.
- The winners of the losers' semi finals moved on to the 3rd–6th place finals to contest said final placings.
- The losers of the winners' semi finals receded to the 3rd–6th place finals to also contest said places, against the winners of the losers' semi finals.
- The winners of the 3rd–6th place finals claimed 3rd and 4th place.
- The losers of the 3rd–6th place finals claimed 5th and 6th place.
- The losers of the losers' semi finals played a consolation match to determine 7th and 8th place.

The top three teams from each stage earned qualification to the Superfinal as well as the best fourth placed team from stage 1 or 2 as per the cumulative standings.

=== Stage 1 ===
The first stage took place in Lignano Sabbiadoro, Italy.

==== Results ====
20 June	Quarter finals (QF)		
20 June	Italy	8–2	Andorra
20 June	Poland	5–5 (a.e.t.); 4–3 (pens.)	Czech Republic
20 June	Spain	9–2	Greece
20 June	Switzerland	11–2	Austria

21 June	QF Winners ↓			QF Losers ↓		
21 June	Winners' semi finals (WSF)			Losers' semi finals (LSF)		
21 June	Italy	7–3	Poland	Greece	8–3	Austria
21 June	Switzerland	4–2	Spain	Czech Republic	5–4	Andorra

22 June	WSF Winners ↓			WSF Losers ↓		LSF Winners ↓	LSF Losers ↓		
22 June	Final			3rd–6th place deciding matches			7th & 8th place match		
22 June	Italy	5–5 (a.e.t.); 1–2 (pens.)	Switzerland	Spain	1–4	Czech Republic	Austria	4–3	Andorra
22 June	Italy	5–5 (a.e.t.); 1–2 (pens.)	Switzerland	Poland	5–2	Greece	Austria	4–3	Andorra

Awards
Best player: (Italy) Roberto Pasquali
Top scorer(s): (Switzerland) Dejan Stankovic (10 goals)
Best goalkeeper: (Switzerland) Nico Jung

==== Final standings ====
Rank	Team	Qualification
1st place, gold medalist(s)	Switzerland	Advance to Superfinal
2nd place, silver medalist(s)	Italy	Advance to Superfinal
3rd place, bronze medalist(s)	Poland	Advance to Superfinal
4	Czech Republic	
5	Greece	
6	Spain	
7	Austria	
8	Andorra	

=== Stage 2 ===
The second stage took place in Tignes, France.

==== Results ====
4 July	Quarter finals (QF)		
4 July	France	12–4	Hungary
4 July	Norway	4–3	Estonia
4 July	Russia	10–0	Netherlands
4 July	Turkey	7–3	England

5 July	QF Winners ↓			QF Losers ↓		
5 July	Winners' semi finals (WSF)			Losers' semi finals (LSF)		
5 July	France	7–4	Turkey	Hungary	3–1 (a.e.t.)	England
5 July	Russia	5–0	Norway	Netherlands	5–3	Estonia

6 July	WSF Winners ↓			WSF Losers ↓		LSF Winners ↓	LSF Losers ↓		
6 July	Final			3rd–6th place deciding matches			7th & 8th place match		
6 July	Russia	8–3	France	Norway	2–3	Hungary	Estonia	3–2	England
6 July	Russia	8–3	France	Turkey	3–5	Netherlands	Estonia	3–2	England

Awards
Best player: (France) Stéphane François
Top scorer(s): (Russia) Egor Shaykov (7 goals)
Best goalkeeper: (Russia) Andrey Bukhlitskiy

==== Final standings ====
Rank	Team	Qualification
1st place, gold medalist(s)	Russia	Advance to Superfinal
2nd place, silver medalist(s)	France	Advance to Superfinal
3rd place, bronze medalist(s)	Netherlands	Advance to Superfinal
4	Hungary	
5	Norway	
6	Turkey	
7	Estonia	
8	England	

== Cumulative standings ==
The top three placing nations from each stage qualified for the Superfinal, along with the statistically best of the two fourth placing teams, as per the below table.

The teams are ranked in order of their final placings in the stage they participated in.

The two teams that finished in the same corresponding final placing in each of the stages (i.e. Spain finished 6th in stage 1 as did Turkey in stage 2) are then split based on which of the nations earned the most points and then on the best goal difference.

Pos	Team	Pld	W	W+	L	GF	GA	GD	Pts	Notes
1	Russia	3	3	0	0	23	3	+20	9	Qualified to Superfinal as top 3 in stage 1 or 2
2	Switzerland	3	2	1	0	20	9	+11	8	Qualified to Superfinal as top 3 in stage 1 or 2
3	Italy	3	2	0	1	20	10	+10	6	Qualified to Superfinal as top 3 in stage 1 or 2
4	France	3	2	0	1	22	16	+6	6	Qualified to Superfinal as top 3 in stage 1 or 2
5	Netherlands	3	2	0	1	10	16	–6	6	Qualified to Superfinal as top 3 in stage 1 or 2
6	Poland	3	1	1	1	13	14	–1	5	Qualified to Superfinal as top 3 in stage 1 or 2
7	Czech Republic	3	2	0	1	14	10	+4	6	Qualified to Superfinal as best fourth place team
8	Hungary	3	1	1	1	10	15	–5	5	
9	Greece	3	1	0	2	12	17	–5	3	
10	Norway	3	1	0	2	6	11	–5	3	
11	Spain	3	1	0	2	12	10	+2	3	
12	Turkey	3	1	0	2	14	15	–1	3	
13	Estonia	3	1	0	2	9	11	–2	3	
14	Austria	3	1	0	2	9	22	–13	3	
15	England	3	0	0	3	6	13	–7	0	
16	Andorra	3	0	0	3	9	17	–8	0	

== Superfinal ==
The Superfinal took place in Vila Real de Santo António, Portugal.

Format

This season the Superfinal was played as a straight knockout tournament. All eight teams contesting the title started in the quarter-finals, playing one match per round until the final when the winner of the 2008 Euro Beach Soccer League was crowned. The losers of the quarter-finals played in consolation matches to determine their final placements.

Seedings

Automatic entrants Portugal were assigned the number 1 seed. The other seeds, numbers 2–8, were allocated based on the order of the qualified nations in the cumulative standings. The top seed were drawn against the eighth seed, second seed against the seventh seed and so on.

=== Results ===
- Dates: QFs – 22 August; SFs – 23 August; Finals – 24 August

Fifth place
3	Switzerland	7
8	Czech Republic	5
Seventh place
7	Poland	5
5	France	7

5th–8th place semifinals
7	Poland	2
3	Switzerland	5
5	France	4
8	Czech Republic	6

Quarterfinals
2	Russia	7
7	Poland	3
3	Switzerland	2 (3)
6	Netherlands (p)	2 (4)
4	Italy	3
5	France	2
8	Czech Republic	2
1	Portugal	5

Semifinals
2	Russia	1
6	Netherlands	3
4	Italy	4
1	Portugal	12

Final
6	Netherlands	1
1	Portugal	5
Third place
2	Russia	6
4	Italy	1

=== Championship match details ===
24 August 2008

Portugal	5–1	Netherlands
Torres; Madjer; Zé Maria	Report	Ajiach

==== Winners ====
2008 Euro Beach Soccer League
champions

Portugal
Third title

=== Awards ===
Best player
(Portugal) Madjer
Top scorer
(Portugal) Madjer
11 goals
Best goalkeeper
(Netherlands) Ran Reijer

=== Superfinal final standings ===
Pos	Team	Notes
1	Portugal	EBSL Champions
2	Netherlands	Runners-up
3	Russia	Third place
4	Italy	
5	Switzerland	
6	Czech Republic	
7	France	
8	Poland	

== Sources ==
- Roonba
- RSSSF
- beachsoccer.ru (in Russian)
