= 2010 Euro Beach Soccer League =

Tournament details
- Teams: 19 (from 1 confederation)
- Venue: 5 (in 5 host cities)

Final positions
- Champions: Portugal (4th title)
- Runners-up: Italy
- Third place: Russia
- Fourth place: Switzerland

Tournament statistics
- Matches played: 53
- Goals scored: 506 (9.55 per match)
- Top scorer(s): (Switzerland) Dejan Stankovic (8 goals)
- Best player: (Portugal) Madjer

The 2010 Euro Beach Soccer League (EBSL) was an annual European competition in beach soccer. The competitions allows national teams to compete in beach soccer in a league format over the summer months. Each season ends with a superfinal, deciding the competition winner.

There were seven teams participating in two divisions in each Stage that faced each other in a round-robin system, with the exception of Stage 4. The top five teams of Division A (including the individual Stage winners) plus the host team Portugal played in the Superfinal in Vila Real de Santo António (Portugal) from August 26–29. The individual Stage winners in Division B plus the worst team in Division A played in the Promotional Final to try to earn promotion to Division A.

== Teams ==
2010 Euro Beach Soccer League Divisions
DIVISION A		DIVISION B		
France	Romania	Azerbaijan	Germany	Netherlands
Italy	Russia	Belarus	Greece	Norway
Poland	Spain	Czech Republic	Hungary	Turkey
Portugal	Switzerland	England	Israel	

== Stage 1 Moscow, Russia – May 28–30 ==
=== Participating nations ===
- Russia
- Poland
- Italy
- Romania
- Greece
- Israel
- Germany

=== Final standings Division A ===
Team	Pld	W	W+	L	GF	GA	+/-	Pts
Russia	3	3	0	0	20	8	+12	9
Italy	3	1	1	1	18	17	+1	5
Romania	3	1	0	2	18	23	−5	3
Poland	3	0	0	3	14	22	−8	0

clinched Superfinal Berth

=== Final standings Division B ===
Team	Pld	W	W+	L	GF	GA	+/-	Pts
Israel	2	2	0	0	15	8	+7	6
Germany	2	1	0	1	10	11	−1	3
Greece	2	0	0	2	10	16	−6	0

clinched Promotional Final Berth

=== Schedule & results ===
28 May 2010
14:00

Greece	5 – 9	Israel

28 May 2010
15:15

Italy	7 – 6 (a.e.t.)	Poland

28 May 2010
16:30

Romania	3 – 9	Russia

29 May 2010
14:15

Germany	3 – 6	Israel

29 May 2010
15:30

Italy	8 – 7	Romania

29 May 2010
16:45

Russia	7 – 2	Poland

30 May 2010
14:00

Greece	5 – 7	Germany

30 May 2010
15:15

Poland	6 – 8	Romania

30 May 2010
16:30

Russia	4 – 3	Italy

=== Individual awards ===
MVP: Roberto Pasquali (Italy)
Top Scorer: Roberto Pasquali (Italy) and Bogusław Saganowski (Poland) – 8 goals
Best Goalkeeper: Andrey Bukhlitskiy (Russia)

== Stage 2 Marseille, France – June 25–27 ==
=== Participating nations ===
- Spain
- France
- Portugal
- Poland
- Belarus
- Hungary
- England

=== Final standings Division A ===
Team	Pld	W	W+	L	GF	GA	+/-	Pts
Spain	3	2	1	0	18	10	+8	8
Poland	3	1	1	1	9	12	−3	5
Portugal	3	1	0	2	12	12	0	3
France	3	0	0	3	9	14	−5	0

clinched Superfinal Berth

=== Final standings Division B ===
Team	Pld	W	W+	L	GF	GA	+/-	Pts
Hungary	2	1	1	0	13	7	+6	5
England	2	1	0	1	5	6	−1	3
Belarus	2	0	0	2	6	11	−5	0

clinched Promotional Final Berth

=== Schedule & results ===
25 June 2010
16:30

Belarus	5 – 8 (a.e.t.)	Hungary

25 June 2010
17:45

Portugal	3 – 6	Spain

25 June 2010
19:00

Poland	3 – 2	France

26 June 2010
16:30

Hungary	5 – 2	England

26 June 2010
17:45

Portugal	3 – 3 (a.e.t.) (0 – 1 p.)	Poland

26 June 2010
19:00

France	4 – 5 (a.e.t.)	Spain

27 June 2010
16:30

Belarus	1 – 3	England

27 June 2010
17:45

Spain	7 – 3	Poland

27 June 2010
19:00

France	3 – 6	Portugal

Top Scorer: Jorge (Spain)

== Stage 3 Lignano, Italy – July 2–4 ==
=== Participating nations ===
- France
- Switzerland
- Portugal
- Italy
- Azerbaijan
- Czech Republic
- Netherlands

=== Standings Division A ===
Team	Pld	W	W+	L	GF	GA	+/-	Pts
Switzerland	3	3	0	0	17	11	+6	9
Portugal	3	2	0	1	19	13	+6	6
Italy	3	1	0	2	12	15	−3	3
France	3	0	0	3	9	18	−9	0

clinched Superfinal Berth

=== Standings Division B ===
Team	Pld	W	W+	L	GF	GA	+/-	Pts
Azerbaijan	2	2	0	0	12	8	+4	6
Czech Republic	2	1	0	1	9	9	0	3
Netherlands	2	0	0	2	8	12	−4	0

clinched Promotional Final Berth

=== Schedule & results ===
2 July 2010
15:30

Azerbaijan	5 – 4	Czech Republic

2 July 2010
16:45

Switzerland	5 – 1	France

2 July 2010
18:00

Italy	2 – 6	Portugal

3 July 2010
15:00

Netherlands	4 – 5	Czech Republic

3 July 2010
16:15

Portugal	8 – 5	France

3 July 2010
17:30

Italy	5 – 6	Switzerland

4 July 2010
15:00

Azerbaijan	7 – 4	Netherlands

4 July 2010
16:15

Portugal	5 – 6	Switzerland

4 July 2010
17:30

France	3 – 5	Italy

=== Individual awards ===
MVP: Pasquale Carotenuto (Italy)
Top Scorer: Dejan Stankovic (Switzerland) – 7 goals
Best Goalkeeper: Paulo Graça (Portugal)

== Stage 4 Den Haag (The Hague), Netherlands – July 22–25 ==
=== Participating nations ===
- Romania
- Russia
- Switzerland
- Spain

=== Standings Division A ===
Team	Pld	W	W+	L	GF	GA	+/-	Pts
Switzerland	3	2	0	1	17	14	+3	6
Russia	3	2	0	1	21	11	+10	6
Romania	3	1	0	2	12	22	−10	3
Spain	3	0	1	2	16	19	−3	2

clinched previous Superfinal Berth	clinched Superfinal Berth

=== Schedule & results ===
22 July 2010
17:00

Russia	4 – 6	Switzerland

23 July 2010
17:00

Russia	11 – 1	Romania

23 July 2010
18:15

Spain	6 – 6 (a.e.t.) (4 – 3 p.)	Switzerland

24 July 2010
17:45

Switzerland	5 – 4	Romania

24 July 2010
19:00

Russia	6 – 4	Spain

25 July 2010
17:45

Spain	6 – 7	Romania

Top Scorer: Marian Măciucă (Romania)

=== Division B (Bibione, Italy) – 16–17 July ===
Team	Pld	W	W+	L	GF	GA	+/-	Pts
Turkey	2	1	0	1	11	9	+2	3
Norway	2	1	0	1	9	11	–2	3
Andorra	Withdrew							

clinched Promotional Final Berth

The games were played on 16 and 17 July 2010 in Bibione, Italy. Turkey won and qualified for the Promotional Final.

Andorra were originally supposed to compete in stage 4 as part of a regular three-team Division B event, but withdrew. In order to ensure the remaining participants (Turkey and Norway) still played two matches as organised, despite Andorra's absence, BSWW simply changed the fixture schedule to have Turkey and Norway play each other twice.

Since both teams were competing in Bibione as part of the 2011 World Cup qualifiers, BSWW staged the games there rather than unnecessarily having the squads travel to the Hague (as was originally planned) merely a week later.

16 July 2010

Turkey	7 – 4	Norway

17 July 2010

Norway	5 – 4	Turkey

== Cumulative standings ==
clinched Superfinal Berth	clinched Promotional Final Berth

=== Division A ===
Pos	Team	Pld	W	W+	L	GF	GA	+/-	Pts
1	Russia	6	5	0	1	41	19	+22	15
2	Switzerland	6	5	0	1	34	25	+9	15
3	Spain	6	2	2	2	34	29	+5	10
4	Portugal	6	3	0	3	31	25	+6	9
5	Italy	6	2	1	3	30	32	−2	8
6	Romania	6	2	0	4	30	45	−15	6
7	Poland	6	1	1	4	23	34	−11	5
8	France	6	0	0	6	18	32	−14	0

=== Division B ===
Pos	Team	Pld	W	W+	L	GF	GA	+/-	Pts
1	Israel	2	2	0	0	15	8	+7	6
2	Azerbaijan	2	2	0	0	12	8	+4	6
3	Hungary	2	1	1	0	13	7	+6	5
4	Turkey	2	1	0	1	11	9	+2	3
5	Czech Republic	2	1	0	1	9	9	0	3
6	Germany	2	1	0	1	10	11	−1	3
7	England	2	1	0	1	5	6	−1	3
8	Norway	2	1	0	1	9	11	−2	3
9	Netherlands	2	0	0	2	8	12	−4	0
10	Belarus	2	0	0	2	6	11	−5	0
11	Greece	2	0	0	2	10	16	−6	0

== EBSL Superfinal and Promotional Final - Lisbon, Portugal – August 26–29 ==
=== Superfinal and Promotional Final Divisions ===
The Divisions for the Euro Beach Soccer League Superfinal are determined. The teams from Division A will compete for the title while the teams from Division B will compete for a spot in next year's Division A round.

2010 Euro Beach Soccer League Superfinal Divisions
DIVISION A (Superfinal)		DIVISION B (Promotional Final)
GROUP A	GROUP B	GROUP A	GROUP B
Russia	Switzerland	France	Israel
Portugal	Spain	Hungary	Azerbaijan
Romania	Italy	England*	Turkey

England will replace the Czech Republic due to several 'impediments' that caused them to withdraw.

=== Division A (Superfinal) ===
==== Group A standings ====
Team	Pld	W	W+	L	GF	GA	+/-	Pts
Portugal	2	2	0	0	10	3	+7	6
Russia	2	1	0	1	8	8	0	3
Romania	2	0	0	2	5	12	−7	0

clinched Superfinal Group

==== Group B standings ====
Team	Pld	W	W+	L	GF	GA	+/-	Pts
Italy	2	2	0	0	14	11	+3	6
Switzerland	2	1	0	1	12	11	+1	3
Spain	2	0	0	2	8	12	−4	0

clinched Superfinal Group

=== Schedule & results ===
==== Round-robin ====
26 August 2010
15:45

Russia	6 – 4	Romania

26 August 2010
17:15

Switzerland	6 – 8	Italy

27 August 2010
15:45

Spain	5 – 6	Italy

27 August 2010
17:15

Portugal	6 – 1	Romania

28 August 2010
15:45

Switzerland	6 – 3	Spain

28 August 2010
17:00

Russia	2 – 4	Portugal

==== Fifth-place match ====
29 August 2010
11:30

Romania	1 – 7	Spain

==== Third-place match ====
29 August 2010
15:45

Russia	7 – 3	Switzerland

==== Championship final match ====
29 August 2010
17:00

Portugal	3 – 2	Italy

=== Individual awards ===
MVP: Madjer (Portugal)
Top Scorer: Dejan Stankovic (Switzerland) – 8 goals
Best Goalkeeper: Andrey Bukhlitskiy (Russia)

=== Final Division A standing ===
Rank	Team
1	Portugal (Fourth EBSL Championship)
2	Italy
3	Russia
4	Switzerland
5	Spain
6	Romania

=== Division B (promotional final) ===
==== Group A standings ====
Team	Pld	W	W+	L	GF	GA	+/-	Pts
France	2	2	0	0	17	6	+11	6
Hungary	2	1	0	1	7	10	−3	3
England	2	0	0	2	7	15	−8	0

clinched Promotional Final Group

==== Group B standings ====
Team	Pld	W	W+	L	GF	GA	+/-	Pts
Turkey	2	1	1	0	8	7	+1	5
Israel	2	1	0	1	6	4	+2	3
Azerbaijan	2	0	0	2	5	8	−3	0

clinched Promotional Final Group

=== Schedule & results ===
==== Round-robin ====
26 August 2010
13:15

Israel	3 – 3 (a.e.t.) (2 – 3 p.)	Turkey

26 August 2010
14:30

France	10 – 4	England

27 August 2010
13:15

Azerbaijan	4 – 5	Turkey

27 August 2010
14:30

Hungary	5 – 3	England

28 August 2010
13:15

Israel	3 – 1	Azerbaijan

28 August 2010
14:30

France	7 – 2	Hungary

==== Fifth-place match ====
29 August 2010
10:00

England	2 – 4	Azerbaijan

==== Third-place match ====
29 August 2010
14:30

Hungary	4 – 8	Israel

==== Promotional final match ====
29 August 2010
13:00

France	3 – 4	Turkey

=== Final Division B standing ===
Rank	Team
1	Turkey (promoted to EBSL Division A next year)
2	France (relegated from EBSL Division A)
3	Israel
4	Hungary
5	Azerbaijan
6	England

== See also ==
- Beach soccer
- Euro Beach Soccer League
