= 2000 Euro Beach Soccer League =

Tournament details
- Dates: 3 June – 3 September
- Teams: 6 (from 1 confederation)
- Venues: 6 (in 6 host cities)

Final positions
- Champions: Spain (2nd title)
- Runners-up: Portugal
- Third place: France
- Fourth place: Italy

Tournament statistics
- Matches played: 24
- Goals scored: 216 (9 per match)
- Top scorer: (Spain) Amarelle
- Best player: (Spain) Amarelle
- Best goalkeeper: (Spain) Abel

The 2000 Euro Beach Soccer League, was the third edition of the Euro Beach Soccer League (EBSL), the premier beach soccer competition contested between European men's national teams, known as the European Pro Beach Soccer League at the time, occurring annually since its establishment in 1998. The league was organised by Pro Beach Soccer S.L. (PBS) between June 3 and September 3, 2000 in five different nations across Europe.

As in previous seasons, the teams of the league continued to compete as one group across a number of rounds of fixtures to gain regular match points and additional bonus points for the overall league table. This was the last season of the EBSL to take place under this original format, as major changes were introduced the following season including amendments to the presentation of the stages of fixtures and introduction of the Superfinal. Austria did not return from last season and were replaced by the Netherlands who competed for the first time.

The 2000 season has been noted as having one of the exciting endings to a season in the early years of the EBSL; defending champions Spain and challengers and arch-rivals Portugal both went into the very final game of the season against each other knowing that a win for either would see their team claim the title.

Ultimately, Spain successfully defended their title by winning the match by a single goal and claimed their second league title.

== Participating teams ==
Six teams took part in the 2000 season of the EBSL.

- France
- Germany
- Italy
- Netherlands
- Portugal
- Spain

== Organisation ==
Locations of the six stages of the 2000 Euro Beach Soccer League

=== Format ===
The format remained the same as that established in 1998, only adjusted to the differing number of stages this year than in previous editions as follows:

Matches were split into six rounds of fixtures known as stages, with two stages hosted Spain and one in France, Italy, Monaco and Portugal, whilst the participating nations of Germany and the Netherlands did not host any stage. Four teams took part in each, three joining the host nation of that particular stage, with each individual team taking part in four of the six stages overall.

Each stage was played as a small knock-out tournament, with semi finals, the final and a third place decider being the fixtures throughout all six rounds. Teams earned points for their successes per game and per stage which were then tallied up in the final league table.

The team who topped the table after all six stages was crowned the winner of the league.

=== Point distribution ===
Points were allocated for the following achievements in each stage, contributing to the final points total in the league table.

Scenario	Points earned
Win in normal time	3 points
Win in overtime/penalties	2 points
Stage winners	3 bonus points
Stage runners-up	2 bonus points

== Stages ==
=== Stage 1 ===
The first stage took place in Saint-Galmier, France. Italy claimed the opening stage title of the season.

3 June 2000
Semi finals
France	3–4	Germany
Italy	4–3 (a.e.t.)	Netherlands
4 June 2000
Third place play-off
France	5–3	Netherlands
Final
Italy	6–5	Germany

Awards
Best player: (France) Eric Cantona
Top scorer(s): (Germany) Suernnich (6 goals)
Best goalkeeper: (France) Pascal Olmeta

=== Stage 2 ===
The second stage took place in Palma de Mallorca, Mallorca, Spain. Despite taking place in Spain, since they were not hosting in their own country, this was considered as the German stage, who took on the status of de facto hosts.

The Spanish were the victors in the second stage.

1 July 2000
Semi finals
Germany	1–5	Portugal
Spain	7–4	Italy
2 July 2000
Third place play-off
Germany	3–1	Italy
Final
Spain	2–1 (a.e.t.)	Portugal

Awards
Best player: (Spain) Joaquín Alonso
Top scorer(s): (Portugal) Alan, (Spain) Amarelle, (Spain) Joaquín Alonso (3 goals each)
Best goalkeeper: (N/A) ?

=== Stage 3 ===
The third stage took place in Cádiz, Spain. The hosts claimed their second consecutive stage crown.

29 July 2000
Semi finals
Italy	5–3	Germany
Spain	4–2	Portugal
30 July 2000
Third place play-off
Portugal	6–4	Germany
Final
Spain	4–2	Italy

Awards
Best player: (Spain) Amarelle
Top scorer(s): (Portugal) José Baracca
Best goalkeeper: (Spain) Abel Resino

=== Stage 4 ===
The fourth stage took place in Vila Nova de Gaia, Portugal. Portugal won their first stage as hosts.

12 August 2000
Semi finals
Netherlands	1–6	France
Portugal	4–1	Spain
13 August 2000
Third place play-off
Spain	9–1	Netherlands
Final
Portugal	9–7	France

Awards
Best player: (Portugal) Madjer
Top scorer(s): (Spain) Amarelle
Best goalkeeper: (Portugal) Zé Miguel

=== Stage 5 ===
The fifth stage took place in Cattolica, Italy. France became the fourth unique nation of the season to win a stage.

26 August 2000
Semi finals
Germany	9–7	Netherlands
Italy	2–4	France
27 August 2000
Third place play-off
Italy	8–7	Netherlands
Final
France	9–2	Germany

Awards
Best player: (France) Frank Bonora
Top scorer(s): (Netherlands) Pascal Boer, (Germany) Markus Högner (5 goals each)
Best goalkeeper: (France) Pascal Olmeta

=== Stage 6 ===
The sixth stage took place in Monte Carlo, Monaco. Despite taking place in Monaco, since they were not hosting in their own country, this was considered as the Dutch stage, who took on the status of de facto hosts. Spain, France and Portugal all went into the final stage with a chance of claiming the title.

Spain secured the title by beating Portugal in the final match of the season to claim the stage.

2 September 2000
Semi finals
Netherlands	1–10	Portugal
France	3–5	Spain
3 September 2000
Third place play-off
Netherlands	5–8	France
Final
Spain	6–5	Portugal

Awards
Best player: (France) Kader Ferhaoui
Top scorer(s): (Portugal) Madjer
Best goalkeeper: (N/A) ?

=== Stage Winners ===
Team	Stage Wins	Stage titles
Spain	3	Palma de Mallorca (2), Cádiz (3), Monte Carlo (6)
Italy	1	Saint-Galmier (1)
Portugal	1	Vila Nova de Gaia (4)
France	1	Cattolica (5)

== Final Table ==
Pos	Team	Matches							Pts	Stages			Bonus Pts	Total Pts	Result
Pos	Team	Pld	W	W+	L	GF	GA	GD	Pts	Pld	W	RU	Bonus Pts	Total Pts	Result
1	Spain	8	6	1	1	38	22	+16	20	4	3	0	9	29	EBSL Champions
2	Portugal	8	5	0	3	42	26	+16	15	4	1	2	7	22	Runners-up
3	France	8	5	0	3	45	31	+14	15	4	1	1	5	20	Third place
4	Italy	8	3	1	4	32	36	–4	11	4	1	1	5	16	
5	Germany	8	3	0	5	31	42	–11	9	4	0	2	4	13	
6	Netherlands	8	0	0	8	28	59	–31	0	4	0	0	0	0	

=== Winners ===
2000 Euro Beach Soccer League
champions

Spain
Second title

== Sources ==
- Roonba
- Calciatori
- BSWW
- RSSSF
