= Republic of Ireland national beach soccer team =

National sports team

Republic of Ireland
- Nickname(s): The Boys in Green; The Green Army
- Association: Football Association of Ireland (FAI)
- Confederation: UEFA (Europe)
- FIFA code: IRL
- BSWW ranking: NR (2 September 2026)
First colours

First international
- Republic of Ireland 1 – 8 Portugal (Dublin, Ireland; 1 June 2001)

Biggest win
- n/a

Biggest defeat
- Portugal 22 – 1 Republic of Ireland (Riccione, Italy; 25 August 2001)

World Cup
- Appearances: 0
- Best result: None

Euro Beach Soccer League
- Appearances: 1 (first in 2001)
- Best result: 8th place (2001)

Euro Beach Soccer Cup
- Appearances: 1 (first in 2002)
- Best result: 8th place (2002)

The Republic of Ireland national beach soccer team has represented Ireland in international beach soccer competitions, under the control of the Football Association of Ireland, the governing body for football in Ireland. After competing in the 2001 and 2002 seasons in the Euro Beach Soccer League and Cup, the team has been inactive since.

A number of notable former association footballers took part in the time the team was active, including former Arsenal and Manchester United forward, Frank Stapleton, and former Blackburn Rovers manager, Owen Coyle who in 2015 recalled his participation with fondness whilst commenting on the difficulty of adapting to a sand surface having played his career on grass.

== Achievements ==
- Euro Beach Soccer League best: 8th place
  - 2001
- Euro Beach Soccer Cup best: 8th place
  - 2002

== Results ==
1 June 2001 2001 EBSL, stage 1	Republic of Ireland	1–8	Portugal	Dublin, Ireland

2 June 2001 2001 EBSL, stage 1	Republic of Ireland	4–6	Italy	Dublin, Ireland

3 June 2001 2001 EBSL, stage 1	Republic of Ireland	4–6	Germany	Dublin, Ireland

15 June 2001 2001 EBSL, stage 2	Portugal	6–1	Republic of Ireland	Carcavelos, Portugal

16 June 2001 2001 EBSL, stage 2	Italy	4–1	Republic of Ireland	Carcavelos, Portugal

17 June 2001 2001 EBSL, stage 2	Germany	8–3	Republic of Ireland	Carcavelos, Portugal

24 August 2001 2001 EBSL, stage 3	Italy	10–0	Republic of Ireland	Riccione, Italy

25 August 2001 2001 EBSL, stage 3	Portugal	22–1	Republic of Ireland	Riccione, Italy

26 August 2001 2001 EBSL, stage 3	Germany	5–3	Republic of Ireland	Riccione, Italy

15 February 2002 2002 Euro Cup, 1st round	Spain	10–0	Ireland	Barcelona, Spain

16 February 2002 2002 Euro Cup, 5th-8th Place Semi-Final	England	11–3	Ireland	Barcelona, Spain

17 February 2002 2002 Euro Cup, 7th Place play-off	Switzerland	10–6	Ireland	Barcelona, Spain

=== All Time Record ===
As of February 2002

Tournament	Pld	W	WE	L	GF	GA	Dif	Pts
Euro Beach Soccer League	9	0	0	9	17	75	–58	0
Euro Beach Soccer Cup	3	0	0	3	9	31	–22	0
Total	12	0	0	12	26	106	–80	0
