= 1999 Euro Beach Soccer League =

Tournament details
- Dates: 22 May – 20 September
- Teams: 6 (from 1 confederation)
- Venue(s): 6 (in 6 host cities)

Final positions
- Champions: Spain (1st title)
- Runners-up: France
- Third place: Portugal
- Fourth place: Italy

Tournament statistics
- Matches played: 24
- Goals scored: 253 (10.54 per match)
- Top scorer(s): (Spain) Quique Setién (20 goals)
- Best player(s): (Portugal) Madjer
- Best goalkeeper: (Portugal) Zé Miguel

The 1999 Euro Beach Soccer League, was the second edition of the Euro Beach Soccer League (EBSL), the premier beach soccer competition contested between European men's national teams, known as the European Pro Beach Soccer League at the time, occurring annually since its establishment in 1998. The league was organised by Beach Soccer Company (BSC) between May 22 and September 20, 1999 in five different nations across Europe.

The format established in the maiden season continued to be used; the teams of the league continued to compete as one group across a number of rounds of fixtures to gain regular match points and additional bonus points for the overall league table.

Switzerland did not return from last season and were replaced by Austria who competed for the first time. Yugoslavia, who competed in 1998, were due to participate again, however to due political reasons were forced to withdraw.

By winning the final in Monte Carlo, Spain secured their first European title. Defending champions Germany finished fifth.

== Participating teams ==
Six teams took part in the 1999 season of the EBSL.

- Austria
- France
- Germany
- Italy
- Portugal
- Spain

== Organisation ==
Locations of the six stages of the 1999 Euro Beach Soccer League

=== Format ===
The format remained the same as that established in 1998, only adjusted to the differing number of stages this year than in previous editions as follows:

Matches were split into six rounds of fixtures known as stages, with two stages hosted Italy and one in Austria, Spain, Monaco and Portugal, whilst the other participating nation, Germany, did not host any stage. Four teams took part in each, with each individual team taking part in four of the six stages overall.

Each stage was played as a small knock-out tournament, with semi-finals, the final and a third place decider being the fixtures throughout all six rounds. Teams earned points for their successes per game and per stage which were then tallied up in the final league table.

The team who topped the table after all six stages was crowned the winner of the league.

=== Point distribution ===
Points were allocated for the following achievements in each stage, contributing to the final points total in the league table.

Scenario	Points earned
Win in normal time	3 points
Win in overtime/penalties	2 points
Stage winners	3 bonus points
Stage runners-up	2 bonus points

== Stages ==
=== Stage 1 ===
The first stage took place in A Coruña, Spain. Portugal were crowned champions of the opening stage of the season.

22 May 1999
Semi finals
Portugal	13–3	Italy
Spain	5–7	France
23 May 1999
Third place play-off
Spain	7–5	Italy
Final
Portugal	6–2	France

=== Stage 2 ===
The second stage took place in Syracuse, Italy. The Spanish were the victors in the second stage.

5 June 1999
Semi finals
Italy	6–5	France
Spain	11–4	Austria
6 June 1999
Third place play-off
France	5–4	Austria
Final
Italy	2–3	Spain

=== Stage 3 ===
The third stage took place in Vienna, Austria. Germany won the stage, their first title of the season.

10 July 1999
Semi finals
Austria	5–7	Spain
Germany	6–6 (a.e.t.); 3–2 (pens.)	Portugal
11 July 1999
Third place play-off
Austria	4–3	Portugal
Final
Germany	4–3	Spain

=== Stage 4 ===
The fourth stage took place in Figueira da Foz, Portugal. Matches that were being played as primarily part of a different event, the 1999 Mundialito tournament, were simultaneously counted as stage 4 of this year's EBSL.

The four nations took part in the European group of the Mundialito's group stage, played in a round robin format. The 1st round of group games were concurrently classed as the semi-finals of stage 4. The subsequent round of group stage matches that saw the corresponding winners of the semi-finals face-off and the losers also play each other counted as the stage final and third place respectively – this happened to be the 3rd and final round of matches of the group stage. These results originally saw Portugal crowned champions of the stage:

Semi finals	Portugal	8–5	France
Semi finals	Germany	8–3	Austria
3rd place	Austria	4–7	France
Final	Portugal	8–3	Germany

However, after the Mundialito took place, a retrospective decision was made to void Portugal's results above in terms of being part of the EBSL's fourth stage. Portugal's results were documented as punitive forfeits.

With Portugal's semi final win vs. France changed to a forfeit, this meant that the "new" stage final was the match which saw the amended semi final winners of Germany and now France play each other, whilst the "new" third place match was that which saw the amended semi final losers of Austria and now Portugal face-off. These fixtures happened during the 2nd round of group stage matches and hence the results of said round were retrospectively considered as the official stage final and third place match instead.

These amendments saw France crowned stage champions.

Semi finals
11 July 1999
Portugal	~~8–5~~ 0–10^{1}	France
13 July 1999
Germany	8–3	Austria
14 July 1999
Third place play-off
Portugal	~~8–2~~ 0–10^{1}	Austria
Final
France	7–4	Germany

^{1}10–0 is the standard scoreline recorded in the event of a forfeit in beach soccer

=== Stage 5 ===
The fifth stage took place in Scoglitti, Italy. Portugal claimed their second stage title.

31 July 1999
Semi finals
Italy	3–1	Austria
Germany	1–5	Portugal
1 August 1999
Third place play-off
Austria	9–5	Germany
Final
Italy	1–4	Portugal

=== Stage 6 ===
The sixth stage took place in Monte Carlo, Monaco. Spain secured the title by beating Italy in the final match of the season to claim the stage.

19 September 1999
Semi finals
France	6–7	Italy
Spain	9–8	Germany
20 September 1999
Third place play-off
France	6–5	Germany
Final
Spain	8–7	Italy

=== Stage winners ===
Team	Stage Wins	Stage titles
Spain	2	Siracusa (2), Monte Carlo (6)
Portugal	2	La Coruña (1), Scoglitti (5)
Germany	1	Vienna (3)
France	1	Figueira da Foz (4)

== Final Table ==
Pos	Team	Matches							Pts	Stages			Bonus Pts	Total Pts	Notes
Pos	Team	Pld	W	W+	L	GF	GA	GD	Pts	Pld	W	RU	Bonus Pts	Total Pts	Notes
1	Spain	8	6	0	2	53	42	+11	18	4	2	1	8	26	EBSL Champions
2	France	8	5	0	3	48	37	+11	15	4	1	1	5	20	Runners-up
3	Portugal	8	4	0	4	37	37	0	12	4	2	0	6	18	Third place
4	Italy	8	3	0	5	34	47	–13	9	4	0	3	6	15	
5	Germany	8	2	1	5	41	48	–7	8	4	1	1	5	13	
6	Austria	8	3	0	5	40	42	–2	9	4	0	0	0	9	

=== Winners ===
1999 Euro Beach Soccer League
champions

Spain
First title

== Sources ==
- Roonba
- RSSSF
