= Donker =

Donker is a Dutch surname. Donker means "dark, somber" in modern Dutch, and was probably a character reference. Alternative spellings include Donkers, (de) Doncker and Donckers. People with these surnames include:

Donker

- Ad Donker (1933–2002), Dutch-born South-African publisher
- Birgit Donker (born 1965), Dutch journalist
- Charles Donker (born 1940), Dutch illustrator
- Greetje Donker (1906–1993), Dutch dancer and choreographer
- Leendert Antonie Donker (1899–1956), Dutch politician
- Pieter Donker (1635–1668), Dutch painter

Donker Curtius

- Dirk Donker Curtius (1792–1864), Dutch politician and Minister of Justice
- Janus Henricus Donker Curtius (1813–1879), Dutch diplomat and last director at Dejima
- Willem Boudewijn Donker Curtius van Tienhoven (1778–1858), Dutch politician

Doncker

- Herman Doncker (1600–1666), Dutch painter
- Ko Doncker (1874–1917), Dutch illustrator and shadow puppeteer
- Tomás Doncker, American blues guitarist and singer

De Doncker

- Eric De Doncker (born 1962), Belgian racing driver
- Wally De Doncker (born 1958), Belgian youth author

Donckers

- Karin Donckers (born 1962), Belgian equestrian
