= 2001 Euro Beach Soccer Cup =

Tournament details
- Host country: Spain
- Dates: 2 February - 4 February 2001
- Teams: 8 (from 1 confederation)
- Venue: 1 (in 1 host city)

Final positions
- Champions: Portugal (2nd title)
- Runners-up: Spain
- Third place: Italy
- Fourth place: Germany

Tournament statistics
- Matches played: 12
- Goals scored: 127 (10.58 per match)

The 2001 Euro Beach Soccer Cup, was the third Euro Beach Soccer Cup, one of Europe's two major beach soccer championships at the time, held in February 2001, in Maspalomas, Spain. Portugal won the championship, with hosts Spain finishing second. Italy beat Germany in the third place playoff to finish third and fourth respectively, replicating the result of the 1998 Euro Beach Soccer Cup.

Eight teams participated in the tournament who played in a straightforward knockout tournament, starting with the quarterfinals, with extra matches deciding the nations who finished in fifth, sixth, seventh and eighth place

== Participating nations ==
- France
- Germany
- Italy
- Netherlands
- Portugal
- Spain
- Switzerland
- Turkey

== Matches ==
=== Main tournament ===
Quarter-finals
2 February 2001
Germany	9
France	7
2 February 2001
Spain	13
Netherlands	2
2 February 2001
Italy	6
Turkey	2
2 February 2001
Portugal	9
Switzerland	4

Semi-finals
3 February 2001
Germany	3
Spain	6
3 February 2001
Italy	4
Portugal	8

Final
4 February 2001
Spain	3
Portugal	4
Third place
4 February 2001
Italy	5
Germany	4

=== Fifth to eighth place deciding matches ===
The following matches took place between the losing nations, in the quarterfinals, to determine the final standings of the nations finishing in fifth to eighth place. The semifinals took place on the same day of the semifinals of the main tournament, and the playoffs took place on the day of the final.

Fifth to eighth place semi finals
QF1	France	7
QF2	Netherlands	6
QF3	Turkey	2
QF4	Switzerland	5

Fifth place playoff
France	7
Switzerland	4
Seventh place playoff
Turkey	5
Netherlands	2

== Winners ==
2001 Euro Beach Soccer Cup
Winners:

Portugal
Second title

== Final standings ==
Rank	Team
1	Portugal
2	Spain
3	Italy
4	Germany
5	France
6	Switzerland
7	Turkey
8	Netherlands
