= 2006 Euro Beach Soccer Cup =

Tournament details
- Host country: Italy
- Dates: 26–28 May 2006
- Teams: 8 (from 1 confederation)
- Venue: 1 (in 1 host city)

Final positions
- Champions: Portugal (6th title)
- Runners-up: France
- Third place: Italy
- Fourth place: Switzerland

Tournament statistics
- Matches played: 12
- Goals scored: 109 (9.08 per match)

The 2006 Euro Beach Soccer Cup was the eighth Euro Beach Soccer Cup, one of Europe's two major beach soccer championships at the time, held in May 2006, in Naples, Italy. Portugal won the championship for the sixth time, retaining their title after failing to win in 2005, with reigning world champions France finishing second. Italy beat 2005 champions Switzerland in the third place playoff to finish third and fourth respectively.

Eight teams participated in the tournament who played in a straightforward knockout tournament, starting with the quarterfinals, with extra matches deciding the nations who finished in fifth, sixth, seventh and eighth place.

== Participating nations ==
- Austria
- France
- Germany
- Hungary
- Italy
- Portugal
- Spain
- Switzerland

== Matches ==
=== Main tournament ===
Quarter-finals
26 May 2006
France | 4
Hungary | 2
26 May 2006
Italy | 8
Austria | 1
26 May 2006
Portugal | 5
Germany | 2
26 May 2006
Switzerland | 5
Spain | 4

Semi-finals
27 May 2006
France (pen.) | 5
Italy | 5
27 May 2006
Portugal (pen.) | 6
Switzerland | 6

Final
28 May 2006
France | 8
Portugal | 9
Third place
28 May 2006
Italy | 6
Switzerland | 4

=== Fifth to eighth place deciding matches ===
The following matches took place between the losing nations in the quarterfinals to determine the final standings of the nations finishing in fifth to eighth place. The semifinals took place on the same day of the semifinals of the main tournament and the playoffs took place on the day of the final.

Fifth to eighth place semi finals
QF1 | Hungary | 5
QF2 | Austria | 3
QF3 | Germany | 1
QF4 | Spain | 6

Fifth place playoff
Hungary | 2
Spain | 4
Seventh place playoff
Austria | 5
Germany | 3

== Winners ==
2006 Euro Beach Soccer Cup
Winners:

Portugal
Sixth title

== Final standings ==
| Rank | Team |
|---|---|
| 1 | Portugal |
| 2 | France |
| 3 | Italy |
| 4 | Switzerland |
| 5 | Spain |
| 6 | Hungary |
| 7 | Austria |
| 8 | Germany |
