= 2008 Euro Beach Soccer Cup =

Tournament details
- Host country: Azerbaijan
- Dates: 18 September - 21 September
- Teams: 6 (from 1 confederation)
- Venue(s): 1 (in 1 host city)

Final positions
- Champions: Spain (2nd title)
- Runners-up: Switzerland
- Third place: Azerbaijan
- Fourth place: Norway

Tournament statistics
- Matches played: 9
- Goals scored: 60 (6.67 per match)

The 2008 Euro Beach Soccer Cup was the tenth Euro Beach Soccer Cup, one of Europe's three major beach soccer championships of the 2008 beach soccer season, held in September 2008, in Baku, Azerbaijan. Spain won the championship for the second time, with Switzerland finishing second. Hosts Azerbaijan beat Norway in the third place play off to finish third and fourth respectively.

A record low six teams participated in the tournament who were split into two groups of three, playing each other once in the groups. The third placed teams in each group played in a fifth place play off, the second placed teams in each group played in a third place play off and the winners of each group played in a final match to decide the winner of the tournament.

== Participating nations ==
- Azerbaijan
- England
- Italy
- Norway
- Spain
- Switzerland

== Group stage ==
=== Group A ===
| Team | Pld | W | W+ | L | GF | GA | GD | Pts |
|---|---|---|---|---|---|---|---|---|
| Spain | 2 | 2 | 0 | 0 | 14 | 4 | +10 | 6 |
| Norway | 2 | 1 | 0 | 1 | 5 | 13 | -8 | 3 |
| Italy | 2 | 0 | 0 | 2 | 6 | 8 | -2 | 0 |

| Qualified for final | Qualified for third place play off | Qualified for fifth place play off |

18 September 2008

| Norway | 4 – 3 | Italy |

Baku, Azerbaijan

19 September 2008

| Spain | 10 – 1 | Norway |

Baku, Azerbaijan

20 September 2008

| Spain | 4 – 3 | Italy |

Baku, Azerbaijan

=== Group B ===
| Team | Pld | W | W+ | L | GF | GA | GD | Pts |
|---|---|---|---|---|---|---|---|---|
| Switzerland | 2 | 2 | 0 | 0 | 13 | 3 | +10 | 6 |
| Azerbaijan | 2 | 1 | 0 | 1 | 3 | 6 | -3 | 3 |
| England | 2 | 0 | 0 | 2 | 4 | 11 | -7 | 0 |

| Qualified for final | Qualified for third place play off | Qualified for fifth place play off |

18 September 2008

| Switzerland | 8 – 3 | England |

Baku, Azerbaijan

19 September 2008

| Azerbaijan | 3 – 1 | England |

Baku, Azerbaijan

20 September 2008

| Azerbaijan | 0 – 5 | Switzerland |

Baku, Azerbaijan

== Knockout stage ==
=== Fifth place play off ===
21 September 2008

| Italy | 5 – 1 | England |

Baku, Azerbaijan

=== Third place play off ===
21 September 2008

| Azerbaijan | 4 – 3 | Norway |

Baku, Azerbaijan

=== Final ===
21 September 2008

| Spain | 2 – 0 | Switzerland |

Baku, Azerbaijan

== Winners ==
2008 Euro Beach Soccer Cup
Winners:

Spain
Second title

== Final standings ==
| Rank | Team |
|---|---|
| 1 | Spain |
| 2 | Switzerland |
| 3 | Azerbaijan |
| 4 | Norway |
| 5 | Italy |
| 6 | England |
