= Dávid Ficsór =

Hungarian footballer

Personal information
- Full name: Dávid Ficsór
- Date of birth: 4 October 1986 (age 40)
- Place of birth: Mezőkövesd, Hungary
- Height: 1.91 m (6 ft 3 in)
- Position: Goalkeeper

Team information
- Current team: Mezőkövesd
- Number: 91

Youth career
- 2003–2006: Mezőkövesd

Senior career*
Years	Team	Apps	(Gls)
2006–	Mezőkövesd	9	(0)
2007–2008	→ Füzesabony (loan)	15	(0)
2008	→ Gyöngyös (loan)	7	(0)
- * Club domestic league appearances and goals as of 6 October 2013

Dávid Ficsór (born 4 October 1986) is a Hungarian professional footballer who plays for Mezőkövesd.
