= 2007 Euro Beach Soccer Cup =

Tournament details
- Host country: Spain
- Dates: 3–5 May 2007
- Teams: 8 (from 1 confederation)
- Venue: 1 (in 1 host city)

Final positions
- Champions: Ukraine (1st title)
- Runners-up: France
- Third place: Portugal
- Fourth place: Switzerland

Tournament statistics
- Matches played: 12
- Goals scored: 89 (7.42 per match)

The 2007 Euro Beach Soccer Cup was the ninth Euro Beach Soccer Cup, one of Europe's two major beach soccer championships at the time, held in May 2007, in Tarragona, Spain. Ukraine won the championship for the first time, with France finishing second. Portugal beat 2005 champions Switzerland in the third place playoff to finish third and fourth respectively.

Eight teams participated in the tournament who played in a straightforward knockout tournament, starting with the quarterfinals, with extra matches deciding the nations who finished in fifth, sixth, seventh and eighth place. This was the last tournament until 2009 to use this format.

== Participating nations ==
- France
- Greece
- Italy
- Poland
- Portugal
- Spain
- Switzerland
- Ukraine

== Matches ==
=== Main tournament ===
Quarter-finals
3 May 2007
France	5
Poland	1
3 May 2007
Portugal	5
Greece	3
3 May 2007
Switzerland	7
Spain	5
3 May 2007
Ukraine	4
Italy	3

Semi-finals
4 May 2007
France	6
Portugal	5
4 May 2007
Switzerland	4
Ukraine	5

Final
5 May 2007
France	0
Ukraine	3
Third place
5 May 2007
Portugal (a.e.t.)	2
Switzerland	1

=== Fifth to eighth place deciding matches ===
The following matches took place between the losing nations in the quarterfinals to determine the final standings of the nations finishing in fifth to eighth place. The semifinals took place on the same day of the semifinals of the main tournament and the playoffs took place on the day of the final.

Fifth to eighth place semi finals
QF1	Poland	5
QF2	Greece	2
QF3	Spain	5
QF4	Italy	3

Fifth place playoff
Poland (pen.)	2
Spain	2
Seventh place playoff
Italy	7
Greece	4

== Winners ==
2007 Euro Beach Soccer Cup
Winners:

Ukraine
First title

== Final standings ==
Rank	Team
1	Ukraine
2	France
3	Portugal
4	Switzerland
5	Poland
6	Spain
7	Italy
8	Greece
