= 2004 Euro Beach Soccer Cup =

Tournament details
- Host country: Portugal
- Dates: 27–29 June 2004
- Teams: 8 (from 1 confederation)
- Venue: 1 (in 1 host city)

Final positions
- Champions: Portugal (5th title)
- Runners-up: Spain
- Third place: Italy
- Fourth place: France

Tournament statistics
- Matches played: 12
- Goals scored: 149 (12.42 per match)

The 2004 Euro Beach Soccer Cup was the sixth Euro Beach Soccer Cup, one of Europe's two major beach soccer championships at the time, held in June 2004, in Lisbon, Portugal. Hosts Portugal won the championship, claiming their fourth successive title and fifth overall, with Spain finishing second. Italy beat France in the third place playoff to finish third and fourth respectively.

Eight teams participated in the tournament who played in a straightforward knockout tournament, starting with the quarterfinals, with extra matches deciding the nations who finished in fifth, sixth, seventh and eighth place.

== Participating nations ==
- Belgium
- England
- France
- Italy
- Norway
- Portugal
- Spain
- Switzerland

== Matches ==
=== Main tournament ===
Quarter-finals
27 June 2004
France	8
Belgium	4
27 June 2004
Portugal	14
Norway	3
27 June 2004
Italy (a.e.t.)	6
Switzerland	5
27 June 2004
Spain	7
England	2

Semi-finals
28 June 2004
France	7
Portugal	12
28 June 2004
Italy	3
Spain	11

Final
29 June 2004
Portugal	8
Spain	3
Third place
29 June 2004
Italy (pen.)	9 (4)
France	9 (3)

=== Fifth to eighth place deciding matches ===
The following matches took place between the losing nations in the quarterfinals to determine the final standings of the nations finishing in fifth to eighth place. The semifinals took place on the same day of the semifinals of the main tournament and the playoffs took place on the day of the final.

Fifth to eighth place semi finals
QF1	Belgium	9
QF3	Norway	10
QF2	Switzerland	1
QF4	England	2

Fifth place playoff
England	4
Norway	3
Seventh place playoff
Belgium	5
Switzerland	4

== Winners ==
2004 Euro Beach Soccer Cup
Winners:

Portugal
Fifth title

== Final standings ==
Rank	Team
1	Portugal
2	Spain
3	Italy
4	France
5	England
6	Norway
7	Belgium
8	Switzerland
