= 2010 Euro Beach Soccer Cup =

Tournament details
- Host country: Italy
- Dates: 4 June - 6 June 2010
- Teams: 8 (from 1 confederation)
- Venue(s): 1 (in 1 host city)

Final positions
- Champions: Russia (1st title)
- Runners-up: Portugal
- Third place: Italy
- Fourth place: Spain

Tournament statistics
- Matches played: 12
- Goals scored: 126 (10.5 per match)

The 2010 Euro Beach Soccer Cup was the twelfth Euro Beach Soccer Cup, one of Europe's three major beach soccer championships of the 2010 beach soccer season, held in June 2010, in Rome, Italy, for the second year in a row. Russia won the championship for the first time, with six time champions Portugal finishing second. Italy beat last year's champions Spain in the third place playoff, ending their run of two consecutive titles, to finish third and fourth respectively.

Eight teams participated in the tournament who played in a straightforward knockout tournament, starting with the quarterfinals, with extra matches deciding the nations who finished in fifth, sixth, seventh and eighth place.

== Participating nations ==
- France
- Hungary
- Italy
- Poland
- Portugal
- Spain
- Switzerland
- Russia

== Matches ==
=== Main tournament ===
Quarter-finals
4 June 2010
Italy	8
Hungary	3
4 June 2010
Portugal	2
Switzerland	1
4 June 2010
Russia	8
France	2
4 June 2010
Spain	8
Poland	3

Semi-finals
5 June 2010
Italy	7
Portugal	10
5 June 2010
Russia	7
Spain	5

Final
6 June 2010
Portugal	4
Russia	6
Third place
6 June 2010
Italy	5
Spain	4

=== Fifth to eighth place deciding matches ===
The following matches took place between the losing nations in the quarterfinals to determine the final standings of the nations finishing in fifth to eighth place. The semifinals took place on the same day of the semifinals of the main tournament and the playoffs took place on the day of the final.

Fifth to eighth place semi finals
QF1	Hungary	1
QF2	Switzerland	7
QF3	France	5
QF4	Poland	7

Fifth place playoff
Switzerland	6
Poland	5
Seventh place playoff
France	7
Hungary	5

== Winners ==
2010 Euro Beach Soccer Cup
Winners:

Russia
First title

== Final standings ==
Rank	Team
1	Russia
2	Portugal
3	Italy
4	Spain
5	Switzerland
6	Poland
7	France
8	Hungary
