= Austria national beach soccer team =

National sports team

Austria
- Nickname: Das Team
- Association: Austrian Football Association
- Confederation: UEFA (Europe)
- Head coach: Gustav Stieglitz
- Captain: Thomas Schellmann
- FIFA code: AUT
- BSWW ranking: 93 ▼2 (2 June 2025)
First colours
Second colours

Biggest win
- Bulgaria 2-7 Austria (Marseille, France; 23 August 2007)

Biggest defeat
- Switzerland 13-5 Austria (Marseille, France; 24 August 2007)

Euro Beach Soccer Cup
- Appearances: 2 (first in 2003)
- Best result: Quarterfinals (2003, 2006)

The Austria national beach soccer team represents Austria in international beach soccer competitions and is controlled by the ÖFB, the governing body for football in Austria.

== Current squad ==
Correct as of January 2011

Note: Flags indicate national team as defined under FIFA eligibility rules; some limited exceptions apply. Players may hold more than one non-FIFA nationality.

No.	Pos.	Nation	Player
—	GK		Patrick Stummer
—	DF		Christoph Oberegger
—	FW		Andreas Gahleitner
—	DF		Daniel Steinbeiß
—	DF		Thomas Schellman
—	FW		Daniel Neuhold

No.	Pos.	Nation	Player
—	FW		Manuel Hammer
—	FW		Sinisa Markovic
—	GK		Stefan Stichlberger
—	FW		Mustafa Cetinyürek
—	DF		Philip Peterstorfer
—	DF		Patrick Gatterbauer

Coach: Gustav Stieglitz

== Achievements ==
- FIFA Beach Soccer World Cup qualification (UEFA) Best: Group stage
  - 2009, 2011
