= 2002 Euro Beach Soccer Cup =

Tournament details
- Host country: Spain
- Dates: 15 February - 17 February 2002
- Teams: 8 (from 1 confederation)
- Venue: 1 (in 1 host city)

Final positions
- Champions: Portugal (3rd title)
- Runners-up: Spain
- Third place: France
- Fourth place: Italy

Tournament statistics
- Matches played: 12
- Goals scored: 138 (11.5 per match)

The 2002 Euro Beach Soccer Cup was the fourth Euro Beach Soccer Cup, one of Europe's two major beach soccer championships at the time, held in February 2002, in Barcelona, Catalonia, Spain. Portugal won the championship, claiming their second successive title and third overall, with hosts Spain finishing second. France beat Italy in the third place playoff to finish third and fourth respectively.

Eight teams participated in the tournament who played in a straightforward knockout tournament, starting with the quarterfinals, with extra matches deciding the nations who finished in fifth, sixth, seventh and eighth place.

== Participating nations ==
- England
- France
- Germany
- Republic of Ireland
- ItalyEuropean
- Portugal
- Spain
- Switzerland

== Matches ==
=== Main tournament ===
Quarter-finals
15 February 2002
France	7
Germany	4
15 February 2002
Portugal	7
Switzerland	5
15 February 2002
Italy	5
England	2
15 February 2002
Spain	11
Republic of Ireland	0

Semi-finals
16 February 2002
France	3
Portugal	9
16 February 2002
Italy	7
Spain	8

Final
17 February 2002
Portugal	2
Spain	1
Third place
17 February 2002
France	9
Italy	6

=== Fifth to eighth place deciding matches ===
The following matches took place between the losing nations in the quarterfinals to determine the final standings of the nations finishing in fifth to eighth place. The semifinals took place on the same day of the semifinals of the main tournament and the playoffs took place on the day of the final.

Fifth to eighth place semi finals
QF1	Germany	9
QF2	Switzerland	6
QF3	England	11
QF4	Republic of Ireland	3

Fifth place playoff
England	5
Germany	2
Seventh place playoff
Switzerland	10
Republic of Ireland	6

== Winners ==
2002 Euro Beach Soccer Cup
Winners:

Portugal
Third title

== Final standings ==
Rank	Team
1	Portugal
2	Spain
3	France
4	Italy
5	England
6	Germany
7	Switzerland
8	Republic of Ireland
