= 2009 Euro Beach Soccer Cup =

Tournament details
- Host country: Italy
- Dates: 22 May - 24 May 2009
- Teams: 8 (from 1 confederation)
- Venue(s): 1 (in 1 host city)

Final positions
- Champions: Spain (3rd title)
- Runners-up: Switzerland
- Third place: Portugal
- Fourth place: Hungary

Tournament statistics
- Matches played: 12
- Goals scored: 106 (8.83 per match)

The 2009 Euro Beach Soccer Cup was the eleventh Euro Beach Soccer Cup, one of Europe's three major beach soccer championships of the 2009 beach soccer season, held in May 2009, in Rome, Italy. Spain won the championship for the third time, with former champions Switzerland finishing second. Six time champions Portugal beat Hungary in the third place playoff to finish third and fourth respectively.

Eight teams participated in the tournament who played in a straightforward knockout tournament, starting with the quarterfinals, with extra matches deciding the nations who finished in fifth, sixth, seventh and eighth place.

== Participating nations ==
- France
- Hungary
- Italy
- Poland
- Portugal
- Spain
- Switzerland
- Russia

== Matches ==
=== Main tournament ===
Quarter-finals
22 May 2009
Portugal	11
Poland	1
22 May 2009
Spain (pen.)	3
Russia	3
22 May 2009
Switzerland	9
France	3
22 May 2009
Italy	2
Hungary	5

Semi-finals
23 May 2009
Portugal	6
Spain	7
23 May 2009
Switzerland	6
Hungary	1

Final
24 May 2009
Spain	6
Switzerland	4
Third place
24 May 2009
Portugal	7
Hungary	5

=== Fifth to eighth place deciding matches ===
The following matches took place between the losing nations in the quarterfinals to determine the final standings of the nations finishing in fifth to eighth place. The semifinals took place on the same day of the semifinals of the main tournament and the playoffs took place on the day of the final.

Fifth to eighth place semi finals
QF1	Poland	1
QF2	Russia	6
QF3	France	3
QF4	Italy	1

Fifth place playoff
Russia	8
France	4
Seventh place playoff
Poland	4
Italy	3

== Winners ==
2009 Euro Beach Soccer Cup
Winners:

Spain
Third title

== Final standings ==
Rank	Team
1	Spain
2	Switzerland
3	Portugal
4	Hungary
5	Russia
6	France
7	Poland
8	Italy
