= 2001 Euro Beach Soccer League =

Tournament details
- Dates: 1 June – 2 September
- Teams: 8 (from 1 confederation)
- Venues: 7 (in 7 host cities)

Final positions
- Champions: Spain (3rd title)
- Runners-up: Portugal
- Third place: Italy
- Fourth place: France

Tournament statistics
- Matches played: 40
- Goals scored: 441 (11.03 per match)
- Top scorer: (Portugal) Madjer
- Best player: (Spain) Amarelle
- Best goalkeeper: (Spain) Roberto Valeiro

Locations of the events of the 2001 Euro Beach Soccer League
Stage events
Superfinal

The 2001 Euro Beach Soccer League, was the fourth edition of the Euro Beach Soccer League (EBSL), the premier beach soccer competition contested between European men's national teams, known as the European Pro Beach Soccer League at the time, occurring annually since its establishment in 1998. The league was organised by Beach Soccer Worldwide (BSWW) between June 1 and September 2, 2001 in seven different nations across Europe.

This season, whilst the teams remained part of one overall cohort, they were split into two groups. Meanwhile, the concept of a regular season and post-season system was introduced. Each team competed in their respective group to try and earn a place in the season-finale and title-deciding event, the Superfinal.

Spain entered the competition as two-time defending champions and successfully defended their title, to win their third European crown.

The league also doubled as the qualification process for the 2002 Beach Soccer World Championship. The nations finishing in first, second and third place qualified.

== Format changes ==
In 2001, BSWW introduced major changes to the EBSL. No longer would the stages of fixtures be played as small knockout tournaments; this was changed to having the stages played in a round robin format, with the results tallied up in a table to determine the winners of the stage. The bonus points awarded in previous years for being stage winners and runners-up was also scrapped. Teams now earned points for the league table solely on match wins.

2001 also saw the introduction of the famous Superfinal play-off event, seen in every edition since. The league champions were no longer to be determined after all the stages were complete based on the league table. The league would now be split into a regular season and post-season system. It was decided from this edition forward, the teams with the most points at end of the regular season stages of fixtures are to qualify for the newly founded post-season playoff event to be known as the Superfinal in which the title is then to be contested directly. The winner of the Superfinal then becomes league champions.

== Teams ==
This season 8 nations took part in the Euro Beach Soccer League whom were and were distributed as follows.

=== Group A ===
- England
- France
- Spain
- Switzerland

=== Group B ===
- Germany
- Italy
- Portugal
- Republic of Ireland

=== Superfinal berths ===
For the inaugural Superfinal, there were four berths available to the top four teams with the most points in the league at the end of the regular season, after all the stages of fixtures were complete. This successful quartet advanced to the season-finale playoff event to contest for the league title. The table summarises in what positions nations needed to finish in their respective groups in order to qualify to the Superfinal.

Allocations:

The groups were seen as being on an equal footing in terms of the distribution of the quality of the teams between the two and so both were allocated two of the four berths to reflect this. The winners and runner-up of both groups qualified for the Superfinal.

#	Position in Group	Group	Round entered
1	Winner	A	Semi-finals
2	Runner-up	A	Semi-finals
3	Winner	B	Semi-finals
4	Runner-up	B	Semi-finals

== Group A ==
Group A consisted of three rounds of fixtures known as stages, hosted in three of the four countries participating; France, Spain and England. The remaining Group A nation, Switzerland, did not host a stage. All four teams took part in each. In each stage, the teams played each other once. The nation who earned the most points at the end of the stage was crowned stage winners.

At the end of the three stages all results were tallied up in a final league table.

=== Stage 1 ===
The first stage took place in Hyde Park, London, England. Spain commenced their EBSL campaign with a stage crown.

==== Matches ====
22 June 2001
England	8–6	Switzerland
Spain	9–6	France
23 June 2001
England	3–6	Spain
France	7–1	Switzerland
24 June 2001
England	2–10	France
Switzerland	6–6 (a.e.t.); 0–1 (pens.)	Spain

==== Final standings ====
Pos	Team	Pld	W	W+	L	GF	GA	GD	Pts
1	Spain	3	2	1	0	21	15	+6	8
2	France	3	2	0	1	23	12	+11	6
3	England	3	1	0	2	13	22	–9	3
4	Switzerland	3	0	0	3	13	21	–8	0

Awards
Best player: (France) Eric Cantona
Top scorer(s): (Spain) Amarelle (8 goals)
Best goalkeeper: (Spain) Roberto Valeiro

=== Stage 2 ===
The second stage took place in Marseille, France. The Spanish won a second consecutive stage.

==== Matches ====
6 July 2001
France	6–4	Switzerland
Spain	13–5	England
7 July 2001
France	15–3	England
Spain	6–1	Switzerland
8 July 2001
France	6–7	Spain
Switzerland	8–5	England

==== Final standings ====
Pos	Team	Pld	W	W+	L	GF	GA	GD	Pts
1	Spain	3	3	0	0	26	12	+14	9
2	France	3	2	0	1	27	14	+13	6
3	Switzerland	3	1	0	2	13	17	–4	3
4	England	3	0	0	3	13	36	–23	0

Awards
Best player: (France) Thierry Ottavy
Top scorer(s): (Spain) Amarelle (12 goals)
Best goalkeeper: (Spain) Roberto Valeiro

=== Stage 3 ===
The third stage took place in Málaga, Spain. Spain's victory in the final round meant a clean sweep of all three stage titles for the hosts.

==== Matches ====
3 August 2001
Switzerland	3–8	France
Spain	11–0	England
4 August 2001
France	13–5	England
Switzerland	2–5	Spain
5 August 2001
England	6–5 (a.e.t.)	Switzerland
France	5–7	Spain

==== Final standings ====
Pos	Team	Pld	W	W+	L	GF	GA	GD	Pts
1	Spain	3	3	0	0	23	7	+16	9
2	France	3	2	0	1	26	15	+11	6
3	England	3	0	1	2	11	29	–18	2
4	Switzerland	3	0	0	3	10	19	–9	0

Awards
Best player: (Spain) Amarelle
Top scorer(s): (Spain) Amarelle (9 goals)
Best goalkeeper: (Spain) Roberto Valeiro

=== Final table ===
The top two teams qualified to the Superfinal. The remaining nations in third and fourth place exited this season's EBSL.

Spain were crowned decisive winners of the group, finishing the three stages without loss. They earned a place in the Superfinal alongside runners-up France. England and Switzerland were left far adrift of the Superfinal qualification spots.

Pos	Team	Pld	W	W+	L	GF	GA	GD	Pts	Qualification
1	Spain	9	8	1	0	70	34	+36	26	Advance to Superfinal
2	France	9	6	0	3	76	41	+35	18	Advance to Superfinal
3	England	9	1	1	7	37	87	–50	5	
4	Switzerland	9	1	0	8	36	57	–21	3	

== Group B ==
Group B also consisted of three rounds of fixtures known as stages, hosted in three of the four countries participating; Portugal, the Republic of Ireland and Italy. The remaining Group B nation, Germany, did not host a stage. All four teams took part in each. In each stage, the teams played each other once. The nation who earned the most points at the end of the stage was crowned stage winners.

At the end of the three stages all results were tallied up in a final league table.

=== Stage 1 ===
The first stage took place in Dublin, Ireland. Portugal won the first stage of Group B.

==== Matches ====
1 June 2001
Republic of Ireland	1–8	Portugal
Germany	4–4 (a.e.t.); 1–2 (pens.) (Note: It can be confirmed that when combining the full-time result and penalty shootout result of this game into one single cumulative scoreline, the result was 6–5. However be aware of the breakdown of the scoreline into its separate full-time and shootout results as shown – these individual scores cannot be comprehensively validated and may potentially be incorrect.)	Italy
2 June 2001
Republic of Ireland	4–6	Italy
Portugal	3–1	Germany
3 June 2001
Republic of Ireland	4–6	Germany
Portugal	5–3	Italy

==== Final standings ====
Pos	Team	Pld	W	W+	L	GF	GA	GD	Pts
1	Portugal	3	3	0	0	16	5	+11	9
2	Italy	3	1	1	1	13	13	0	5
3	Germany	3	1	0	2	11	11	0	3
4	Rep. of Ireland	3	0	0	3	9	20	–11	0

Awards
Best player: (Republic of Ireland) Tommy Coyne
Top scorer(s): (Portugal) Madjer (11 goals)
Best goalkeeper: (Portugal) Zé Miguel

=== Stage 2 ===
The second stage took place in Carcavelos, Portugal. The Portuguese won a second consecutive stage.

==== Matches ====
15 June 2001
Italy	6–5	Germany
Portugal	6–1	Republic of Ireland
16 June 2001
Republic of Ireland	1–4	Italy
Portugal	7–1	Germany
17 June 2001
Germany	8–3	Republic of Ireland
Portugal	6–3	Italy

==== Final standings ====
Pos	Team	Pld	W	W+	L	GF	GA	GD	Pts
1	Portugal	3	3	0	0	19	5	+14	9
2	Italy	3	2	0	1	13	12	+1	6
3	Germany	3	1	0	2	14	16	–2	3
4	Rep. of Ireland	3	0	0	3	5	18	–13	0

Awards
Best player: (Portugal) Madjer
Top scorer(s): (Portugal) Madjer (6 goals)
Best goalkeeper: (Italy) Danilo Pagani

=== Stage 3 ===
The third stage took place in Riccione, Italy. Portugal won the third and final stage crown ensuring they were the victors of all three.

==== Matches ====
24 August 2001
Italy	10–0	Republic of Ireland
Portugal	7–1	Germany
25 August 2001
Italy	5–4	Germany
Portugal	22–1	Republic of Ireland
26 August 2001
Germany	5–3	Republic of Ireland
Italy	5–12	Portugal

==== Final standings ====
Pos	Team	Pld	W	W+	L	GF	GA	GD	Pts
1	Portugal	3	3	0	0	41	7	+34	9
2	Italy	3	2	0	1	20	16	+4	6
3	Germany	3	1	0	2	10	15	–5	3
4	Rep. of Ireland	3	0	0	3	4	37	–33	0

Awards
Best player: (Italy) Daniele Massaro
Top scorer(s): (Portugal) Madjer (18 goals)
Best goalkeeper: (Portugal) Zé Miguel

=== Final table ===
The top two teams from qualified to the Superfinal. The remaining nations in third and fourth place exited this season's EBSL.

Portugal dominated the group and were crowned winners, finishing without dropping a single point. They earned a place in the Superfinal alongside runners-up Italy. Germany and the Republic of Ireland finished well off the pace of the Superfinal qualifiers.

Pos	Team	Pld	W	W+	L	GF	GA	GD	Pts	Qualification
1	Portugal	9	9	0	0	76	17	+59	27	Advance to Superfinal
2	Italy	9	5	1	3	46	41	+5	17	Advance to Superfinal
3	Germany	9	3	0	6	35	42	–7	9	
4	Rep. of Ireland	9	0	0	9	18	75	–57	0	

== Superfinal ==
=== Qualified teams ===
This is a summary of the teams who qualified for the Superfinal.

#	Team	Group	Round entered
1	Spain	A	Semi-finals
2	France	A	Semi-finals
3	Portugal	B	Semi-finals
4	Italy	B	Semi-finals

=== Results ===
- Dates: 1–2 September 2001
- Location: Monte Carlo, Monaco

This season the inaugural Superfinal was played as a straight knockout tournament. All four teams contesting the title started in the semi-finals. The teams played one match per round until the final when the winner of the 2001 Euro Beach Soccer League was crowned. The losers of the semi-finals played in a third place play-off match to decide third and fourth place in the final league placements.

The format of the semi-finals saw the winners of Group A play the runners-up of Group B and the winners of Group B play the runners-up of Group A.

Semi-finals
A1	Spain	8
B2	Italy	4
A2	France	6
B1	Portugal	8

Final
A1	Spain	3
B1	Portugal	2
Third place play-off
B2	Italy	9
A2	France	7

==== Semi-finals ====
1 September 2001

Spain	8–4	Italy
Setien; Beñat; Salinas; Amarelle	Report	Vierchowod; Albore; Ganz; Soldà

Monte Carlo, Monaco

1 September 2001

Portugal	8–6	France
Hernâni; Madjer; Alan; Barraca	Report	Marquet; Ferhaoui; Cantona; Ottavy

Monte Carlo, Monaco

==== Third place play-off ====
2 September 2001

France	7–9	Italy
Bonora; Santini; Ottavy; Di Fraya; Jairzinho; Fournier	Report	Ganz; Massaro; Soldà; Fruzetti; Vierchowod

Monte Carlo, Monaco

==== Championship final ====
2 September 2001

Spain	3–2	Portugal
Setien; Amarelle	Report	Madjer; Alan

Monte Carlo, Monaco

===== Winners =====
2001 Euro Beach Soccer League
champions

Spain
Third title

Awards
Best player: (Spain) Amarelle
Top scorer(s): (Portugal) Madjer (5 goals)
Best goalkeeper: (Spain) Roberto Valeiro

=== Final standings ===
Spain beat Portugal in the final to extend their run of two successive Euro Beach Soccer League titles, to three, at just their fourth attempt.

Finishing in the top three positions also earned those nations qualification straight into the upcoming World Cup.

Pos	Team	Notes	Qualification
1	Spain	EBSL Champions	Qualified to 2002 Beach Soccer World Championship
2	Portugal	Runners-up	Qualified to 2002 Beach Soccer World Championship
3	Italy	Third place	Qualified to 2002 Beach Soccer World Championship
4	France		
5	Germany		
6	England		
7	Switzerland		
8	Republic of Ireland		

== Sources ==
- Roonba
- BSWW archive
- RSSSF
