= 2003 Euro Beach Soccer Cup =

Tournament details
- Host country: Belgium
- Dates: 18 April - 20 April 2003
- Teams: 8 (from 1 confederation)
- Venue: 1 (in 1 host city)

Final positions
- Champions: Portugal (4th title)
- Runners-up: France
- Third place: Spain
- Fourth place: Germany

Tournament statistics
- Matches played: 12
- Goals scored: 142 (11.83 per match)

The 2003 Euro Beach Soccer Cup was the fifth Euro Beach Soccer Cup. Held in April 2003, it was one of Europe's two major beach soccer championships at the time in Liège, Belgium. Portugal won the championship, claiming their third successive title and fourth overall, with France finishing second. This was the first time the final was not between Portugal and Spain since the tournament was established in 1998. Spain beat Germany in the third place playoff to finish third and fourth respectively. This was the first time the host nation had not featured in the top four places.

Eight teams participated in what was a straightforward knockout tournament, starting with the quarterfinals, with extra matches deciding the nations who finished in fifth, sixth, seventh and eighth place.

== Participating nations ==
- Austria
- Belgium
- France
- Germany
- Italy
- Portugal
- Spain
- Switzerland

== Matches ==
=== Main tournament ===
Quarter-finals
18 April 2003
Belgium	5
Germany (pen.)	5
18 April 2003
Portugal	8
Switzerland	0
18 April 2003
France	12
Austria	1
18 April 2003
Spain	11
Italy	7

Semi-finals
19 April 2003
Germany	4
Portugal	5
19 April 2003
France (a.e.t.)	5
Spain	4

Final
20 April 2003
Portugal	6
France	3
Third place
20 April 2003
Spain	6
Germany	3

=== Fifth to eighth place deciding matches ===
The following matches took place between the losing nations in the quarterfinals to determine the final standings of the nations finishing in fifth to eighth place. The semifinals occurred on the same day of the semifinals of the main tournament and the playoffs took place on the day of the final.

Fifth to eighth place semi finals
QF1	Belgium	8
QF2	Switzerland	4
QF3	Austria	5
QF4	Italy	11

Fifth place playoff
Belgium	7
Italy	6
Seventh place playoff
Switzerland (pen.)	8
Austria	8

== Winners ==
2003 Euro Beach Soccer Cup
Winners:

Portugal
Fourth title

== Final standings ==
Rank	Team
1	Portugal
2	France
3	Spain
4	Germany
5	Belgium
6	Italy
7	Switzerland
8	Austria
