= Netherlands national beach soccer team =

National beach soccer team

Netherlands
- Association: Beach Soccer Bond Nederland
- Confederation: UEFA (Europe)
- Head coach: Matteo Marrucci
- Captain: Michael Wolf
- FIFA code: NED
First colours
Second colours

Biggest defeat
- Brazil 16-2 Netherlands (Rio de Janeiro, Brazil; 24 January 1995)

The Netherlands national beach soccer team represents the Netherlands in international beach soccer competitions and is controlled by the Royal Dutch Football Association, the governing body for football in the Netherlands.

== Competitive record ==
=== FIFA Beach Soccer World Cup Qualification (UEFA) ===
FIFA Beach Soccer World Cup Qualification Record
| Year | Round | Pld | W | WE | WP | L | GS | GA | Dif | Pts |
|---|---|---|---|---|---|---|---|---|---|---|
| (Spain) 2008 | - | 3 | 0 | 0 | 1 | 2 | 10 | 13 | -3 | 1 |
| (Spain) 2009 | - | 4 | 2 | 0 | 0 | 2 | 16 | 17 | -1 | 6 |
| (Italy) 2011 | - | 4 | 2 | 0 | 0 | 2 | 12 | 17 | -5 | 6 |
| (Russia) 2013 | - | 8 | 5 | 0 | 1 | 2 | 31 | 24 | +7 | 16 |
| (Italy) 2015 | Did not enter | | | | | | | | | |
| (Italy) 2017 | - | 3 | 1 | 0 | 0 | 2 | 4 | 17 | -13 | 3 |
| (Russia) 2019 | Did not enter | | | | | | | | | |
| (Portugal) 2021 | Did not enter | | | | | | | | | |
| (Azerbaijan) 2023 | Did not enter | | | | | | | | | |
| Total | 5/9 | 22 | 10 | 0 | 2 | 10 | 73 | 88 | -15 | 32 |

== Current squad ==
Correct as of July 2016

Note: Flags indicate national team as defined under FIFA eligibility rules; some limited exceptions apply. Players may hold more than one non-FIFA nationality.

| No. | Pos. | Nation | Player |
|---|---|---|---|
| 1 | GK | | Reinier Elias |
| 2 | DF | | Rob Dietvorst |
| 4 | DF | | Michael Wolf |
| 5 | MF | | Wesley Donkers |
| 6 | FW | | Nick de Wit |

| No. | Pos. | Nation | Player |
|---|---|---|---|
| 7 | FW | | Donker |
| 8 | FW | | Kampman |
| 9 | MF | | Timmer |
| 10 | DF | | van Drie |
| 12 | GK | | Mark Smith |

Coach: (Italy) Matteo Marrucci

== Current staff ==
- Technical Assistant: Roël Liefden
- Team Manager: Danny de Jong

== Achievements ==
- FIFA Beach Soccer World Cup Best: Eighth place
  - 1995
- Euro Beach Soccer League Best: Runners-up
  - 2008
