= 1999 Euro Beach Soccer Cup =

Tournament details
- Host country: Spain
- Dates: 3 September – 4 September 1999
- Teams: 4 (from 1 confederation)
- Venue(s): 1 (in 1 host city)

Final positions
- Champions: Spain (2nd title)
- Runners-up: Portugal
- Third place: France
- Fourth place: Italy

Tournament statistics
- Matches played: 4
- Goals scored: 42 (10.5 per match)

The 1999 Euro Beach Soccer Cup was the second Euro Beach Soccer Cup, one of Europe's two major beach soccer championships at the time, held in September 1999, in Alicante, Spain.

Four teams participated in the tournament, which was played as part of the 1999 World Series. The World Series was played in 2 groups of 4 teams - a World Group (for non-European teams) and a European Group, which doubled as the Euro Beach Soccer Cup for 1999. Both groups played in a knock-out format, with semi-finals followed by a third place match and a final.

Hosts Spain won the championship, with Portugal finishing second. France beat Italy in the third place play off to finish third and fourth respectively.

Winners Spain went on to play the winners of the World Group, Brazil, in the final of the 1999 World Series, ultimately losing 7–1.

== Participating nations ==
- France
- Italy
- Portugal
- Spain

== Matches ==
=== Main tournament ===
Semi-finals
3 September 1999
Portugal	5
France	3
3 September 1999
Spain	9
Italy	2

Final
4 September 1999
Spain	6
Portugal	2
Third place
4 September 1999
France	8
Italy	7

== Winners ==
1999 Euro Beach Soccer Cup
Winners:

Spain
First title

== Final standings ==
Rank	Team
1	Spain
2	Portugal
3	France
4	Italy
