= 2012 Euro Beach Soccer Cup =

Tournament details
- Host country: Russia
- Dates: 17 – 19 February 2012
- Teams: 8 (from 1 confederation)
- Venue: 1 (in 1 host city)

Final positions
- Champions: Russia (2nd title)
- Runners-up: Portugal
- Third place: Switzerland
- Fourth place: Italy

Tournament statistics
- Matches played: 11
- Goals scored: 90 (8.18 per match)
- Top scorer(s): (Portugal) Madjer (6 goals) (Switzerland) Dejan Stankovic (6 goals) (Italy) Giuseppe Soria (6 goals)
- Best player: (Russia) Alexey Makarov

The 2012 Euro Beach Soccer Cup was held in Moscow. The venue was the Luzhniki Palace of Sports in the Russian capital of Moscow. Eight teams with better results in 2011 come together for this competition, with a one-round knock-out system that took place between February 17–19.

Just like in the 2005 Euro Beach Soccer Cup, the Euro Beach Soccer Cup was hosted in Russia, and the Muscovite climate at that time of the year meant the tournament was held indoors. Russia, Switzerland, Portugal, Italy, Spain, Romania, Poland, and France were the participating countries.

== Participating nations ==
- Russia
- Portugal
- Switzerland
- Spain
- Italy
- Romania
- Poland
- France

== Matches ==
All kickoff times are listed as local time in Moscow (UTC+4).

=== Main Tournament ===
Quarter-finals
17 February 2012
Switzerland	3
Romania	0
17 February 2012
Portugal	5
Poland	3
17 February 2012
Russia	5
France	1
17 February 2012
Spain	4
Italy	11

Semi-finals
18 February 2012
Switzerland	6
Portugal	7
18 February 2012
Russia	4
Italy	1

Final
19 February 2012
Russia	4
Portugal	2
Third place
19 February 2012
Italy	4
Switzerland	5

=== Quarter finals ===
17 February 2012
15:15

Switzerland	3 - 0	Romania
	WALKOVER

17 February 2012
16:30

Spain	4 - 11	Italy
M. Beiro 5', 23'; Kuman 15', 35'	Report	15', 22', 23', 36' G. Soria; 5', 19', 28' P. Palmacci; 1', 34' S. Feudi; 20' F. Corosiniti; 33' S. Marinai

17 February 2012
17:45

Portugal	5 - 3	Poland
Madjer 14', 35'; B. Novo 7'; B. Torres 8'; B. Piechnik 18' (o.g.)	Report	1' B. Saganowski; 14' D. Baran; 16' B. Piechnik

17 February 2012
19:00

Russia	5 - 1	France
D. Shishin 21', 32', 35'; A. Makarov 16', 21'	Report	24' G. Touchat

=== Semi finals ===
18 February 2012
15:30

Switzerland	6 - 7	Portugal
D. Stankovic 7', 8', 15', 15', 32'; M. Jaeggy 34'	Report	4', 6', 14' Madjer; 3', 28' R. Coimbra; 2' Jordan; 9' B. Novo

18 February 2012
16:45

Russia	4 - 1	Italy
A. Makarov 7', 26'; A. Bukhlitskiy 12'; E. Shaykov 30'	Report	28' G. Soria

=== Third place ===
19 February 2012
15:30

Italy	4 - 5	Switzerland
G. Soria 3'; F. Corosiniti 6'; M. Leghissa 33'; D. Ramacciotti 36'	Report	8' D. Stankovic; 16' S. Spaccarotella; 25' S. Meier; 36', 36' P. Borer

=== Final ===
19 February 2012
16:45

Russia	4 - 2	Portugal
E. Eremeev 18', 30'; E. Shaykov 8'; A. Makarov 23'	Report	32' Lucio; 36' Madjer

=== Fifth to eighth place deciding matches ===
The following matches took place between the losing nations in the quarterfinals to determine the final standings of the nations finishing in fifth to eighth place. The semifinals took place on the same day of the semifinals of the main tournament and the playoffs took place on the day of the final.

All kickoff times are listed as local time in Moscow (UTC+4).

Fifth to eighth place semi finals
QF1	Romania	2
QF3	Poland	6
QF4	France	2
QF2	Spain	3

Fifth place playoff
Poland	3
Spain	2
Seventh place playoff
Romania	4
France	6

=== Fifth to eighth place semi finals ===
18 February 2012
13:00

Romania	2 - 6	Poland
M. Posteucă 18'; Maci 28'	Report	6', 25' P. Friszkemut; 15', 34' D.Baran; 4' K. Grzegorczyk; 27' T. Wydmuszek

18 February 2012
14:15

France	2 - 3	Spain
C. Torres 16' (o.g.); J. Basquaise 28'	Report	3', 7' Kuman; 31' Pajon

=== Seventh place playoff ===
19 February 2012
13:00

Romania	4 - 6	France
L. Croituru 6', 25'; J. Basquaise 16' (o.g.); L. Chirilă 31'	Report	6', 26' D. Samoun; 18', 30' J. Basquaise; 16' F. Mendy; 20' A. Barbotti

=== Fifth place playoff ===
19 February 2012
14:15

Poland	3 - 2	Spain
D. Depta 6'; P. Friszkemut 17'; B. Saganowski 27'	Report	6' Kuman; 18' M. Beiro

== Winners ==
2012 Euro Beach Soccer Cup

Russia
Second title

== Awards ==
Best Player (MVP)
(Russia) Aleksey Makarov
Top Scorer(s)
(Portugal) Madjer (6 goals)
(Switzerland) Dejan Stankovic (6 goals)
(Italy) Giuseppe Soria (6 goals)
Best Goalkeeper
(Russia) Andrey Bukhlitskiy

== Top scorers ==
6 goals

- (Portugal) Madjer
- (Switzerland) D. Stankovic
- (Italy) G. Soria

5 goals

- (Russia) A. Makarov
- (Spain) Kuman

3 goals

- (Russia) D. Shishin
- (Portugal) B. Novo
- (Italy) P. Palmacci
- (Poland) D. Baran
- (Poland) P. Friszkemut
- (France) J. Basquaise

2 goals

- (Russia) E. Eremeev
- (Russia) E. Shaykov
- (Switzerland) P. Borer
- (Italy) S. Feudi
- (Italy) F. Corosiniti
- (Portugal) R. Coimbra
- (Poland) B. Saganowski
- (Spain) M. Beiro
- (France) D. Samoun
- (Romania) L. Croituru

1 goal

- (Russia) A. Bukhlitskiy
- (Portugal) Lucio
- (Portugal) Jordan
- (Portugal) B. Torres
- (Switzerland) S. Meier
- (Switzerland) S. Spaccarotella
- (Switzerland) M. Jaeggy
- (Italy) D. Ramacciotti
- (Italy) S. Marinai
- (Italy) M. Leghissa
- (Poland) K. Grzegorczyk
- (Poland) T. Wydmuszek
- (Poland) B. Piechnik
- (Poland) D. Depta
- (Spain) Pajon
- (France) G. Touchat
- (France) F. Mendy
- (France) A. Barbotti
- (Romania) Maci
- (Romania) M. Posteucă
- (Romania) L. Chirilă

Own goal

- (Poland) B. Piechnik
- (Spain) C. Torres
- (France) J. Basquaise

== Discipline ==
Cards issued

Player with most cards

Team with most cards

- Yellow (23)
- Second yellow (1)
- Red (2)
- (Romania) I. Gândac (3)
- (Poland) B. Piechnik (2)
- (France) J. Basquaise (2)
- Poland (7)
- Portugal (6)
- Italy (5)
- Romania (5)
- France (4)

== Final standings ==
Rank	Team
1	Russia
2	Portugal
3	Switzerland
4	Italy
5	Poland
6	Spain
7	France
8	Romania
