= 2005 Euro Beach Soccer Cup =

Tournament details
- Host country: Russia
- Dates: 2 December - 4 December 2005
- Teams: 8 (from 1 confederation)
- Venue(s): 1 (in 1 host city)

Final positions
- Champions: Switzerland (1st title)
- Runners-up: Russia
- Third place: Portugal
- Fourth place: Ukraine

Tournament statistics
- Matches played: 12
- Goals scored: 101 (8.42 per match)

The 2005 Euro Beach Soccer Cup was the seventh Euro Beach Soccer Cup, one of Europe's two major beach soccer championships at the time, held in December 2005, in Moscow, Russia. Switzerland won the championship for the first time, with hosts Russia finishing second. Portugal beat Ukraine in the third place playoff to finish third and fourth respectively. This was the first time since the tournament's establishment that Portugal had failed to reach the final and the first time Spain had finished outside the top four.

Eight teams participated in the tournament who played in a straightforward knockout tournament, starting with the quarterfinals, with extra matches deciding the nations who finished in fifth, sixth, seventh and eighth place.

== Participating nations ==
- Belgium
- France
- Italy
- Portugal
- Russia
- Spain
- Switzerland
- Ukraine

== Matches ==
=== Main tournament ===
Quarter-finals
2 December 2005
Portugal (a.e.t.)	4
Spain	3
2 December 2005
Russia	2
Belgium	1
2 December 2005
Switzerland	6
France	4
2 December 2005
Ukraine	6
Italy	4

Semi-finals
3 December 2005
Portugal	3
Russia	5
3 December 2005
Switzerland (pen.)	4
Ukraine	4

Final
4 December 2005
Russia	3
Switzerland	4
Third place
4 December 2005
Portugal	5
Ukraine	4

=== Fifth to eighth place deciding matches ===
The following matches took place between the losing nations in the quarterfinals to determine the final standings of the nations finishing in fifth to eighth place. The semifinals took place on the same day of the semifinals of the main tournament and the playoffs took place on the day of the final.

Fifth to eighth place semi finals
QF1	Spain	8
QF2	Belgium	3
QF3	France	5
QF4	Italy	7

Fifth place playoff
Spain	5
Italy	4
Seventh place playoff
France	4
Belgium	3

== Winners ==
2005 Euro Beach Soccer Cup
Winners:

Switzerland
First title

== Final standings ==
Rank	Team
1	Switzerland
2	Russia
3	Portugal
4	Ukraine
5	Spain
6	Italy
7	France
8	Belgium
