= 1998 Euro Beach Soccer Cup =

Tournament details
- Host country: Italy
- Dates: 1–6 September 1998
- Teams: 7 (from 1 confederation)
- Venue: 1 (in 1 host city)

Final positions
- Champions: Portugal (1st title)
- Runners-up: Spain
- Third place: Italy
- Fourth place: Germany

Tournament statistics
- Matches played: 11
- Goals scored: 103 (9.36 per match)

The 1998 Euro Beach Soccer Cup was the first Euro Beach Soccer Cup, one of Europe's two major beach soccer championships at the time, held in September 1998, in Siracusa, Italy. Portugal won the championship, with Spain finishing second. Hosts Italy beat Germany in the third place play off to finish third and fourth respectively.

Seven nations participated in the tournament who were split into two groups of three and four, playing each other once in the groups. The second placed teams in each group played in a third place play off and the winners of each group played in a final match to decide the winner of the tournament.

== Participating nations ==
- France
- Germany
- Italy
- Portugal
- Spain
- Switzerland
- Yugoslavia

== Group stage ==
=== Group A ===
| Team | Pld | W | W+ | L | GF | GA | GD | Pts |
|---|---|---|---|---|---|---|---|---|
| Portugal | 3 | 3 | 0 | 0 | 24 | 8 | +16 | 9 |
| Germany | 3 | 1 | 0 | 2 | 13 | 13 | 0 | 3 |
| France | 3 | 1 | 0 | 2 | 12 | 20 | -8 | 3 |
| Switzerland | 3 | 1 | 0 | 2 | 12 | 21 | -8 | 3 |

| Qualified for final | Qualified for third place play off |

1 September 1998

| Germany | 7 – 5 | Switzerland |

Siracusa, Italy

1 September 1998

| Portugal | 11 – 3 | France |

Siracusa, Italy

2 September 1998

| France | 4 – 3 | Germany |

Siracusa, Italy

2 September 1998

| Portugal | 9 – 2 | Switzerland |

Siracusa, Italy

4 September 1998

| Portugal | 4 – 3 | Germany |

Siracusa, Italy

4 September 1998

| Switzerland | 6 – 5 | France |

Siracusa, Italy

=== Group B ===
| Team | Pld | W | W+ | L | GF | GA | GD | Pts |
|---|---|---|---|---|---|---|---|---|
| Spain | 2 | 2 | 0 | 0 | 8 | 4 | +4 | 6 |
| Italy | 2 | 1 | 0 | 1 | 9 | 7 | +2 | 3 |
| Yugoslavia | 2 | 0 | 0 | 2 | 4 | 10 | -6 | 0 |

| Qualified for final | Qualified for third place play off |

1 September 1998

| Italy | 3 – 4 | Spain |

Siracusa, Italy

2 September 1998

| Spain | 4 – 1 | Yugoslavia |

Siracusa, Italy

4 September 1998

| Italy | 6 – 3 | Yugoslavia |

Siracusa, Italy

== Knockout stage ==
=== Third place play off ===
6 September 1998

| Italy | 11 – 4 | Germany |

Siracusa, Italy

=== Final ===
6 September 1998

| Portugal | 2 – 2 (1-0 p) | Spain |

Siracusa, Italy

== Winners ==
1998 Euro Beach Soccer Cup
Winners:

Portugal
First title

== Final standings ==
| Rank | Team |
|---|---|
| 1 | Portugal |
| 2 | Spain |
| 3 | Italy |
| 4 | Germany |
| 5 | France |
| 6 | Switzerland |
| 7 | Yugoslavia |
