= Hungary national beach soccer team =

Hungary
- Association: Magyar Labdarúgó Szövetség (MLSZ)
- Confederation: UEFA (Europe)
- Head coach: Tamás Weisz
- Captain: Márk Ughy
- Most caps: László Berkes (72)
- Top scorer: Viktor Fekete (56)
- FIFA code: HUN
- BSWW ranking: 80 ▼3 (2 June 2025)
First colours
Second colours

First international
- France 12–4 Hungary (Tignes, France; 4 July 2008)

Biggest win
- Hungary 16–2 Denmark (Siófok, Hungary; 12 August 2017)

Biggest defeat
- Russia 8–0 Hungary (Belgrade, Serbia; 29 June 2016)

The Hungary national beach soccer team represents Hungary in international beach soccer competitions and is controlled by the Magyar Labdarúgó Szövetség, the governing body for football in Hungary.

== Competitive record ==
=== FIFA Beach Soccer World Cup Qualification (UEFA) ===
FIFA Beach Soccer World Cup Qualification Record
Year	Result	Pld	W	WE	WP	L	GS	GA	Dif	Pts
(Spain) 2008	Round of 16	4	2	0	0	2	11	22	-11	6
(Spain) 2009	Group Stage	3	0	0	0	3	10	18	-8	0
(Italy) 2011	Quarter-Finals	5	2	0	1	2	26	29	-3	7
(Russia) 2013	Playoff Stage	7	3	0	0	4	22	27	-5	9
(Italy) 2015	7th Place	8	3	1	0	4	36	30	+6	11
(Italy) 2017	15th Place	8	1	0	2	5	27	41	-14	5
(Russia) 2019	Round of 16	4	1	1	0	2	9	11	-2	5
(Portugal) 2021	Did not enter									
(Azerbaijan) 2023	Did not enter									
(Spain) 2025	Did not enter									
Total	7/10	39	12	2	3	22	141	168	-27	43

== Current squad ==
Correct as of July 2012

Note: Flags indicate national team as defined under FIFA eligibility rules; some limited exceptions apply. Players may hold more than one non-FIFA nationality.

No.	Pos.	Nation	Player
1	GK	HUN	Csaba Borszéki
4	DF	HUN	Szabolcs Badalik
7	FW	HUN	Viktor Fekete
8	MF	HUN	Márk Ughy (captain)
9	DF	HUN	Ferenc Besenyei
10	DF	HUN	Ábel Peter

No.	Pos.	Nation	Player
13	MF	HUN	László Berkes
14	FW	HUN	Péter Jaksa
15	MF	HUN	Renáto Takács
20	GK	HUN	Tamás Weisz
12	GK	HUN	Dávid Ficsor

Coach: Tamás Weisz

HFF Head of Beach Soccer: Zsolt Izsvak
