= Spain national beach soccer team =

Spain
- Nickname: La Roja (The Red One)
- Association: Royal Spanish Football Federation
- Confederation: UEFA (Europe)
- Head coach: Christian Méndez
- Captain: Dona
- Most caps: Amarelle (309)
- Top scorer: Amarelle (303)
- FIFA code: ESP
- BSWW ranking: 5 (1 June 2026)
First colours
Second colours

First international
- Spain L–W United States; Score unknown (Alicante, Spain; 13 July 1996)

Biggest win
- Spain 14–2 Latvia (Moscow, Russia; 23 July 2019)

Biggest defeat
- Brazil 13–0 Spain (Vitória, Brazil; 28 November 1998)

World Cup
- Appearances: 8 (first in 2005)
- Best result: (silver) Runners-up (2013)

Euro Beach Soccer League
- Appearances: 22 (first in 1998)
- Best result: (gold) Champions, (1999, 2000, 2001, 2003, 2006, 2026)

Euro Beach Soccer Cup
- Appearances: 15 (first in 1998)
- Best result: (gold) Champions (1999, 2008, 2009, 2014)

The Spain national beach soccer team represents Spain in international beach soccer competitions and is controlled by the RFEF, the governing body for football in Spain.

== Results and fixtures ==
The following is a list of match results in the last 12 months, as well as any future matches that have been scheduled.

Legend

Win Draw Lose Fixture

=== 2021 ===
19 August 2021 FIFA Beach Soccer World Cup GS Group B	Mozambique	4–8	Spain	Moscow, Russia
19:00 UTC+3	Nelson 20'; Figo 21', 24' (pen.), 35'	Report (FIFA)	Antonio 6'; Chiky 8', 9' (pen.), 25'; Eduard 13', 30'; Llorenç 21'; Tivane 36' (o.g.)	Stadium: Luzhniki Beach Soccer Stadium; Attendance: 953; Referee: Turki Al Salehi (Oman)

21 August 2021 FIFA Beach Soccer World Cup GS Group B	Tahiti	12–8	Spain	Moscow, Russia
15:00 UTC+3	Taiarui 1'; Paama 9' (pen.), 35'; Zaveroni 11', 33', 35'; Tehau 12', 15'; Salem 16', 18'; Tetauira 29', 35'	Report (FIFA)	Torres 5', 36'; David 13'; Chiky 14', 28'; Riduan 19', 24'; Perez 27'	Stadium: Luzhniki Beach Soccer Stadium; Attendance: 1,372; Referee: Yuichi Hatano (Japan)

23 August 2021 FIFA Beach Soccer World Cup GS Group B	Spain	5–3	United Arab Emirates	Moscow, Russia
15:00 UTC+3	Chiky 13'; Eduard 15'; Torres 17'; Perez 21', 30'	Report (FIFA)	A. Mohammad 7', 22'; Malahi 9'	Stadium: Luzhniki Beach Soccer Stadium; Attendance: 1,183; Referee: Aecio Fernández (Uruguay)

26 August 2021 FIFA Beach Soccer World Cup Quarter-finals	Russia	4–2	Spain	Moscow, Russia
20:30 UTC+3	Kotenev 6'; Nikonorov 14'; Makarov 15'; Paporotnyi 34'	Report (FIFA)	Eduard 20'; Antonio 22'	Stadium: Luzhniki Beach Soccer Stadium; Attendance: 2,500; Referee: Mariano Romo (Argentina)

== Players ==
=== Current squad ===
The following players and staff members were called up for the 2021 FIFA Beach Soccer World Cup.

Note: Flags indicate national team as defined under FIFA eligibility rules; some limited exceptions apply. Players may hold more than one non-FIFA nationality.

No.	Pos.	Nation	Player
1	GK	ESP	Francisco Donaire
2	MF	ESP	David Ardil
3	DF	ESP	Antonio Mayor
4	DF	ESP	Adri Frutos
5	DF	ESP	José Cintas
6	MF	ESP	Dris Bouzian
7	FW	ESP	Pablo Perez

No.	Pos.	Nation	Player
8	MF	ESP	Francisco Mejias
9	FW	ESP	Eduard Suarez
10	FW	ESP	Llorenç Gómez
11	FW	ESP	Chiky Ardil
12	GK	ESP	Pablo Lopez
13	GK	ESP	Juanmi
14	MF	ESP	Javi Torres

Head coach: Cristian Mendez Lacarcel
Assistant coach: Jesus Sanchez Requena

== Competitive record ==
=== Beach Soccer World Championships ===
World Championships record
Year	Round	Pos	Pld	W	W+	L	GF	GA	GD
(Brazil) 1995	did not enter								
(Brazil) 1996	did not enter								
(Brazil) 1997	did not enter								
(Brazil) 1998	Group Stage	6th	4	2	0	2	17	22	–5
(Brazil) 1999	Quarterfinals	5th	2	1	0	1	9	12	–3
(Brazil) 2000	Third Place	3rd	5	2	1	2	22	22	0
(Brazil) 2001	Quarterfinals	6th	3	1	0	2	2	5	–3
(Brazil) 2002	Group Stage	6th	3	1	0	2	11	9	+2
(Brazil) 2003	Runners-up	2nd	5	3	0	2	26	25	+1
(Brazil) 2004	Runners-up	2nd	5	4	0	1	22	13	+9
Total	0 titles	7/10	27	14	1	12	109	108	+1

=== FIFA Beach Soccer World Cup ===
FIFA World Cup record										Qualification (UEFA) record								
Year	Round	Pos	Pld	W	W+	L	GF	GA	GD	Round	Pos	Pld	W	W+	L	GF	GA	GD
(Brazil) 2005	Quarterfinals	7th	3	1	0	1	9	12	–3	No qualification matches								
(Brazil) 2006	Group Stage	10th	3	1	0	2	10	12	–2	No qualification matches								
(Brazil) 2007	Quarterfinals	7th	4	2	0	2	20	16	+4	No qualification matches								
(France) 2008	Fourth Place	4th	6	3	1	2	20	14	+6	Champions	1st	7	6	1	0	39	13	+26
(United Arab Emirates) 2009	Quarterfinals	6th	4	2	0	1	23	17	+6	Champions	1st	7	6	1	0	42	17	+25
(Italy) 2011	Did not qualify									Quarterfinals	–	5	3	0	2	24	17	+5
(French Polynesia) 2013	Runners-up	2nd	6	5	0	1	19	15	+4	Champions	1st	8	6	1	1	43	23	+20
(Portugal) 2015	Group Stage	10th	3	1	0	2	9	9	0	Fourth place	4th	8	5	1	2	48	27	+2
(The Bahamas) 2017	Did not qualify									Final Stage	9th	8	6	0	2	39	21	+18
(Paraguay) 2019	Did not qualify									Sixth place	6th	7	4	0	3	52	26	+26
(Russia) 2021	Quarter-finals	7th	4	2	0	2	23	23	0	Champions	1st	6	4	1	1	31	14	+17
(United Arab Emirates) 2024	Group Stage	13th	3	0	0	3	13	16	−3	Play-offs	6th	4	2	0	2	17	12	+8
(Seychelles) 2025	Quarter-finals		4	2	0	2	13	15	–2	Qualified								
Total	0 titles	10/14	40	19	1	18	159	149	+10	4 titles	8/8	56	40	5	11	318	179	+139

== Honours ==
- FIFA Beach Soccer World Cup:
  - Runner-up: 2003, 2004, 2013
  - Third place: 2000
- Euro Beach Soccer League: 1999, 2000, 2001, 2003, 2006, 2026
  - Runner-up: 2002, 2014, 2018
- Euro Beach Soccer Cup: 1999, 2008, 2009, 2014
  - Runner-up: 1998, 2001, 2002, 2004
  - Third place: 2003
- Mundialito de Futebol de Praia: 2013
  - Runner-up: 1997, 2004, 2012, 2018
  - Third place: 2001, 2003, 2009, 2019
- Copa Latina:
  - Runner-up: 2000, 2004
  - Third place: 1998
- FIFA Beach Soccer World Cup qualification: 2008, 2009, 2013

== See also ==
- Spain women's national beach soccer team
