= 2017 FIFA Beach Soccer World Cup squads =

The 2017 FIFA Beach Soccer World Cup was an international beach soccer tournament held in the Bahamas from 27 April to 7 May 2017. The 16 national teams involved in the tournament were required by FIFA to register a squad of 12 players, including two goalkeepers. Only players in these squads were eligible to take part in the tournament which was revealed on 20 April 2017.

This article lists the national beach soccer squads that took part in the tournament. The age listed for each player is as on 27 April 2017, the first day of the tournament and the names of the players shown are that of the FIFA Display Names listed on the official squad document issued by FIFA.

== Group A ==
=== Bahamas ===
Head coach: (Brazil) Alexandre Soares

No.	Pos.	Player	Date of birth (age)	Caps	Club
1	GK	Julio Jemison	24 February 1994 (aged 23)		(The Bahamas) UB
2	FW	Jean Francois	13 December 1991 (aged 25)		(The Bahamas) United FC
3	MF	Mark Daniels	10 November 1984 (aged 32)		(The Bahamas) United FC
4	FW	Renardo McCallum	17 December 1988 (aged 28)		(The Bahamas) Baha Jrs
5	FW	Kyle Williams	4 October 1987 (aged 29)		(The Bahamas) Bears FC
6	FW	Gary Joseph	14 September 1990 (aged 26)		(The Bahamas) Dynamos FC
7	DF	Nesly Jean	16 March 1984 (aged 33)		(The Bahamas) Bears FC
8	DF	Dwayne Forbes	20 January 1989 (aged 28)		(The Bahamas) United FC
9	DF	Daron Beneby	4 May 1984 (aged 32)		(The Bahamas) Dynamos FC
10	FW	Lesly St. Fleur	21 March 1989 (aged 28)		(The Bahamas) Bears FC
11	FW	Gavin Christie	6 August 1981 (aged 35)		(The Bahamas) Cavalier FC
12	GK	Ivan Rolle	23 September 1996 (aged 20)		(The Bahamas) Baha Jrs

=== Switzerland ===
Head coach: Angelo Schirinzi

No.	Pos.	Player	Date of birth (age)	Caps	Club
1	GK	Manuel Bruder	31 December 1986 (aged 30)		(Switzerland) BSC Havana Shots Aargau
2	DF	John Osso	27 April 1984 (aged 33)		(Switzerland) BSC Grasshoppers Zurich
3	MF	Kaspar Jaeggy	15 May 1984 (aged 32)		(Switzerland) BSC Chargers Baselland
4	DF	Nicola Werder	5 February 1992 (aged 25)		(Switzerland) BSC Chargers Baselland
5	MF	Michael Misev	15 February 1991 (aged 26)		(Switzerland) BSC Sable Dancers Bern
6	FW	Tobias Steinemann	6 June 1996 (aged 20)		(Switzerland) BSC Havana Shots Aargau
7	MF	Sandro Spaccarotella	5 August 1982 (aged 34)		(Switzerland) BSC Chargers Baselland
8	DF	Mo Jaeggy	1 January 1983 (aged 34)		(Switzerland) BSC Chargers Baselland
9	FW	Dejan Stankovic	25 August 1985 (aged 31)		(Switzerland) BSC Grasshoppers Zurich
10	FW	Noel Ott	15 January 1994 (aged 23)		(Switzerland) BSC Grasshoppers Zurich
11	FW	Glenn Hodel	22 November 1996 (aged 20)		(Switzerland) BSC Grasshoppers Zurich
12	GK	Valentin Jaeggy	19 October 1986 (aged 30)		(Switzerland) BSC Chargers Baselland

=== Ecuador ===
Head coach: Jose Palma

No.	Pos.	Player	Date of birth (age)	Caps	Club
1	GK	Carlos Saltos	8 April 1986 (aged 31)		(Ecuador) CS Emelec
2	DF	Hugo Cevallos	25 April 1989 (aged 28)		(Ecuador) CS Emelec
3	FW	Cesar Barre	13 March 1983 (aged 34)		(Ecuador) Delfin SC
4	DF	Mario Alava	9 April 1986 (aged 31)		(Ecuador) Elegole FC
5	FW	Jose Vera	19 March 1996 (aged 21)		(Ecuador) Elegole FC
6	DF	Cristhian Gallegos	26 August 1985 (aged 31)		(Ecuador) Elegole FC
7	FW	Segundo Moreira	1 September 1978 (aged 38)		(Ecuador) CS Emelec
8	MF	Jorge Bailon	22 May 1985 (aged 31)		(Ecuador) CS Emelec
9	FW	Daniel Cedeno	6 May 1983 (aged 33)		(Ecuador) Elegole FC
10	DF	Mauricio Mera	19 March 1979 (aged 38)		(Ecuador) Jocay Central
11	MF	Joffre Delgado	29 June 1983 (aged 33)		(Ecuador) Jocay Central
12	GK	Jorge Leon	26 May 1988 (aged 28)		(Ecuador) Elegole FC

=== Senegal ===
Head coach: Oumar Sylla

No.	Pos.	Player	Date of birth (age)	Caps	Club
1	GK	Al Seyni Ndiaye	31 December 1989 (aged 27)		(Senegal) Vision Sport
2	FW	Hamidou Barry	29 September 1988 (aged 28)		(Senegal) Yeumbeul BS
3	DF	Ibra Thioune	23 October 1985 (aged 31)		(Senegal) Beach Foot Association
4	DF	Papa Ndour	30 August 1991 (aged 25)		(Senegal) Vision Sport
5	DF	Mamadou Sylla	22 February 1986 (aged 31)		(Senegal) Beach Foot Association
6	DF	Papa Ndoye	9 September 1985 (aged 31)		(Senegal) Olympique Ngor BS
7	MF	Babacar Fall	5 March 1989 (aged 28)		(Senegal) Yeumbeul BS
8	MF	Hamad Diouf	30 December 1997 (aged 19)		(Senegal) APLN
9	FW	Lansana Diassy	6 April 1990 (aged 27)		(Senegal) Golf Beach Club
10	MF	Mamour Diagne	4 October 1990 (aged 26)		(Senegal) Beach Foot Association
11	FW	Ibrahima Balde	8 September 1988 (aged 28)		(Senegal) Beach Foot Association
12	GK	Abdoul Samba	16 September 1994 (aged 22)		(Senegal) Beach Foot Association

== Group B ==
=== Nigeria ===
Head coach: Audu Adamu

No.	Pos.	Player	Date of birth (age)	Caps	Club
1	GK	Godwin Ayalogu	11 December 1985 (aged 31)		(Nigeria) Kwara United FC
2	DF	Emmanuel Ohwoferia	10 December 1992 (aged 24)		(Nigeria) Owibeseb FC
3	DF	Ogbonnaya Okemmiri	13 June 1986 (aged 30)		(Nigeria) Abia Warriors FC
4	DF	Adams Taiwo	22 October 1992 (aged 24)		(Nigeria) Owibeseb FC
5	DF	Godspower Igudia	13 August 1993 (aged 23)		(Nigeria) Akwa United FC
6	DF	Victor Tale	9 September 1989 (aged 27)		(Nigeria) Kogi United FC
7	FW	Isiaka Olawale	11 November 1983 (aged 33)		(Nigeria) Kwara United FC
8	FW	Azeez Abu	31 May 1994 (aged 22)		(Nigeria) Enyimba FC
9	FW	Emeka Ogbonna	11 January 1992 (aged 25)		(Nigeria) Leeds FC
10	FW	Bartholomew Ibenegbu	22 February 1986 (aged 31)		(Nigeria) Enyimba FC
11	FW	Suleiman Mohammed	20 September 1996 (aged 20)		(Nigeria) Ifeanyi Ubah FC
12	GK	Danjuma Paul	18 December 1992 (aged 24)		(Nigeria) Katsina United FC

=== Italy ===
Head coach: Massimo Agostini

No.	Pos.	Player	Date of birth (age)	Caps	Club
1	GK	Stefano Spada	2 August 1983 (aged 33)		(Italy) Real Cerva
2	DF	Alfioluca Chiavaro	2 June 1983 (aged 33)		(Italy) SC Palazzolo
3	DF	Matteo Marrucci	18 October 1983 (aged 33)		(Italy) SC Pisa
4	MF	Michele Di Palma	10 August 1988 (aged 28)		(Italy) Pisa BS
5	MF	Alessio Frainetti	22 March 1986 (aged 31)		(Italy) Terracina
6	MF	Simone Marinai	9 July 1988 (aged 28)		(Italy) F.C. Esperia Viareggio
7	DF	Dario Ramacciotti	4 October 1987 (aged 29)		(Italy) F.C. Esperia Viareggio
8	DF	Francesco Corosiniti	6 July 1984 (aged 32)		(Italy) Real Cerva
9	FW	Emmanuele Zurlo	27 February 1988 (aged 29)		(Italy) Catania BS
10	FW	Gabriele Gori	10 October 1987 (aged 29)		(Italy) Castelnuovo Garfagnana
11	MF	Paolo Palmacci	17 May 1984 (aged 32)		(Italy) Terracina
12	GK	Simone Del Mestre	28 August 1983 (aged 33)		(Italy) Calcio Catania SpA

=== Iran ===
Head coach: Mohammad Mirshamsi

No.	Pos.	Player	Date of birth (age)	Caps	Club
1	GK	Peyman Hosseini	16 February 1984 (aged 33)		(Iran) Pars Jonoobi
2	DF	Amir Akbari	26 January 1992 (aged 25)		(Iran) Pars Jonoobi
3	DF	Hassan Abdollahi	11 September 1984 (aged 32)		(Iran) Malavan Anzali FC
4	DF	Mostafa Kiani	23 August 1985 (aged 31)		(Iran) Pars Jonoobi
5	MF	Mohammad Moradi	31 August 1996 (aged 20)		(Iran) Shahrdari Tabriz
6	DF	Ali Nazem	14 April 1993 (aged 24)		(Iran) Moghavemat Golsa Poosh
7	DF	Ali Mirshekari	24 February 1997 (aged 20)		(Iran) Pars Jonoobi
8	MF	Farid Boulokbashi	8 June 1983 (aged 33)		(Iran) Malavan Anzali FC
9	FW	Mohammad Mokhtari	4 July 1990 (aged 26)		(Iran) Moghavemat Golsa Poosh
10	FW	Moslem Mesigar	17 September 1984 (aged 32)		(Iran) Pars Jonoobi
11	FW	Mohammad Ahmadzadeh	25 November 1986 (aged 30)		(Iran) Pars Jonoobi
12	GK	Hamid Behzadpour	31 May 1987 (aged 29)		(Iran) Moghavemat Golsa Poosh

=== Mexico ===
Head coach: Ramon Mejía

No.	Pos.	Player	Date of birth (age)	Caps	Club
1	GK	Diego Villaseñor	22 May 1987 (aged 29)		
2	DF	Ángel Rodríguez	21 February 1985 (aged 32)		
3	DF	Carlos Hernández	18 June 1991 (aged 25)		
4	MF	Saúl Aguilar	14 April 1995 (aged 22)		
5	DF	Benjamín Méndez	2 September 1985 (aged 31)		
6	MF	Gonzalo Tovar	8 May 1985 (aged 31)		
7	MF	Ramón Maldonado	25 April 1988 (aged 29)		
8	MF	Jairo Alemán	8 July 1988 (aged 28)		
9	FW	Diego Rodríguez	8 March 1990 (aged 27)		
10	FW	Abdiel Villar	16 March 1983 (aged 34)		
11	FW	Daniel Sánchez	9 June 1995 (aged 21)		
12	GK	Éder Patiño	11 March 1984 (aged 33)		

== Group C ==
=== United Arab Emirates ===
Head coach: Mohamed Bashir

No.	Pos.	Player	Date of birth (age)	Caps	Club
1	GK	Mohamed Aljasmi	7 September 1988 (aged 28)		(United Arab Emirates) Al Ahli FC
2	DF	Haitham Mohamed	21 June 1980 (aged 36)		(United Arab Emirates) Al Ahli FC
3	DF	Ahmed Beshr	11 February 1989 (aged 28)		
4	DF	Waleed Beshr	29 May 1990 (aged 26)		
5	MF	Abbas Ali	25 January 1989 (aged 28)		(United Arab Emirates) Al Ahli FC
6	FW	Kamal Ali	7 May 1989 (aged 27)		(United Arab Emirates) Al Ahli FC
7	FW	Mohamed Alzaabi	30 March 1982 (aged 35)		(United Arab Emirates) Al Ahli FC
8	DF	Ali Mohammad	19 August 1996 (aged 20)		
9	MF	Ali Karim	25 April 1980 (aged 37)		(United Arab Emirates) Al Nasr SC
10	DF	Walid Mohammad	1 April 1984 (aged 33)		(United Arab Emirates) Al Nasr SC
11	MF	Rami Almesaabi	22 April 1982 (aged 35)		(United Arab Emirates) Al Ahli FC
12	GK	Humaid Jamal	15 August 1989 (aged 27)		(United Arab Emirates) Al Ahli FC

=== Paraguay ===
Head coach: (Brazil) Gustavo Zloccowick

No.	Pos.	Player	Date of birth (age)	Caps	Club
1	GK	Rolando Gonzalez	29 August 1979 (aged 37)		(Paraguay) Casa España
2	FW	Juan Lopez	7 December 1987 (aged 29)		(Paraguay) Selección Encarnacena
3	DF	Gustavo Benitez	13 June 1981 (aged 35)		(Paraguay) Selección Encarnacena
4	MF	Luis Ojeda	18 October 1990 (aged 26)		(Paraguay) Club Nautico Puerta del Lago
5	DF	Jesus Rolon	30 November 1990 (aged 26)		(Paraguay) Selección Aregüeña
6	FW	Pedro Moran	9 June 1990 (aged 26)		(Paraguay) Casa España
7	DF	Edgar Barreto	28 September 1988 (aged 28)		(Paraguay) Deportivo Sajonia
8	DF	Carlos Carballo	31 January 1993 (aged 24)		(Paraguay) Club Nautico Puerta del Lago
9	DF	Sergio Diaz	7 January 1992 (aged 25)		(Paraguay) Selección San Bernardino
10	FW	Orlando Zayas	11 April 1987 (aged 30)		(Paraguay) Selección Encarnacena
11	DF	Sergio Villaverde	23 January 1989 (aged 28)		(Paraguay) Casa España
12	GK	Ivan Fernandez	23 March 1988 (aged 29)		(Paraguay) Mbigua BS

=== Portugal ===
Head coach: Mario Narciso

No.	Pos.	Player	Date of birth (age)	Caps	Club
1	GK	Tiago Petrony	18 November 1988 (aged 28)		(Portugal) Sporting CP
2	DF	Rui Coimbra	14 April 1986 (aged 31)		(Portugal) Sporting CP
3	FW	Leo Martins	29 December 1989 (aged 27)		(Brazil) CR Flamengo
4	DF	Bruno Torres	21 April 1980 (aged 37)		(Portugal) S.C. Braga
5	MF	Jordan Santos	2 July 1991 (aged 25)		(Portugal) Sporting CP
6	MF	Alan	21 June 1975 (aged 41)		(Brazil) Botafogo FR
7	MF	Madjer	22 January 1977 (aged 40)		(Portugal) Sporting CP
8	FW	Zé Maria	23 July 1982 (aged 34)		(Portugal) S.C. Braga
9	DF	Bruno Novo	4 May 1982 (aged 34)		(Portugal) S.C. Braga
10	FW	Belchior	9 October 1982 (aged 34)		(Portugal) Sporting CP
11	FW	Bê Martins	29 December 1989 (aged 27)		(Portugal) S.C. Braga
12	GK	Elinton Andrade	23 March 1988 (aged 29)		(Spain) Barcelona

=== Panama ===
Head coach: (Uruguay) Shubert Perez

No.	Pos.	Player	Date of birth (age)	Caps	Club
1	GK	Adalberto Guzman	9 September 1988 (aged 28)		Panama FC
2	DF	Justo Arrocha	6 July 1986 (aged 30)		(Panama) Darien FC
3	DF	Alberto Kelly	3 April 1997 (aged 20)		(Panama) Colon FC
4	DF	Pascual Galvez	7 December 1990 (aged 26)		(Panama) Los Santos FC
5	MF	Alfonso Maquensi	7 August 1997 (aged 19)		Panama FC
6	MF	Rafael Garcia	2 March 1988 (aged 29)		(Panama) Los Santos FC
7	FW	Eliecer Garcia	4 November 1991 (aged 25)		(Panama) Cocle FC
8	MF	Gilberto Rangel	30 January 1982 (aged 35)		Panama FC
9	FW	Julio Watson	16 June 1990 (aged 26)		Panama FC
10	FW	Alberto Bultron	29 May 1991 (aged 25)		(Panama) Veraguas FC
11	FW	Ricardo Obregon	6 November 1985 (aged 31)		Panama FC
12	GK	Jose Victoria	14 September 1980 (aged 36)		Panama FC

== Group D ==
=== Brazil ===
Head coach: Gilberto Sousa

No.	Pos.	Player	Date of birth (age)	Caps	Club
1	GK	Mão	6 December 1978 (aged 38)		(Brazil) Espirito Santo FC
2	FW	Fernando	8 March 1981 (aged 36)		(Brazil) Sport Recife
3	MF	Filipe	12 September 1993 (aged 23)		(Brazil) Sport Recife
4	DF	Catarino	9 January 1990 (aged 27)		(Brazil) CR Vasco da Gama
5	DF	Daniel	3 November 1982 (aged 34)		(Brazil) SC Corinthians
6	FW	Lucão	4 August 1991 (aged 25)		(Brazil) CR Vasco da Gama FC
7	FW	Bokinha	6 January 1991 (aged 26)		(Brazil) CR Vasco da Gama
8	MF	Bruno Xavier	15 August 1984 (aged 32)		(Brazil) Centro de Treinamento Missao
9	FW	Rodrigo	16 August 1993 (aged 23)		(Brazil) Botafogo FR
10	MF	Datinha	12 April 1988 (aged 29)		(Brazil) Sampaio Correa FC
11	MF	Mauricinho	9 December 1989 (aged 27)		(Brazil) CR Vasco da Gama
12	GK	Rafa Padilha	11 May 1993 (aged 23)		(Brazil) CR Vasco da Gama

=== Tahiti ===
Head coach: Teiva Izal

No.	Pos.	Player	Date of birth (age)	Caps	Club
1	GK	Jonathan Torohia	22 February 1985 (aged 32)		(French Polynesia) AS Manu Ura
2	DF	Angelo Tchen	8 March 1982 (aged 35)		(French Polynesia) AS Tefana
3	DF	Ariihau Teriitau	23 January 1989 (aged 28)		(French Polynesia) AS Pirae
4	DF	Heimanu Taiarui	24 August 1986 (aged 30)		(French Polynesia) AS Pirae
5	MF	Raimoana Bennett	15 February 1981 (aged 36)		(French Polynesia) AS Pirae
6	MF	Patrick Tepa	28 May 1989 (aged 27)		(French Polynesia) AS Tiare
7	MF	Raimana Li Fung Kuee	10 April 1985 (aged 32)		(French Polynesia) AS Pirae
8	FW	Heiarii Tavanae	15 February 1992 (aged 25)		(French Polynesia) AS Central Sport
9	FW	Naea Bennett	8 July 1977 (aged 39)		(French Polynesia) AS Pirae
10	FW	Tearii Labaste	19 July 1991 (aged 25)		(French Polynesia) AS Pirae
11	MF	Teva Zaveroni	10 October 1975 (aged 41)		(French Polynesia) AS Pirae
12	GK	Franck Revel	18 July 1984 (aged 32)		(French Polynesia) AS Pirae

=== Japan ===
Head coach: (Brazil) Marcelo Mendes

No.	Pos.	Player	Date of birth (age)	Caps	Club
1	GK	Shingo Terukina	8 September 1984 (aged 32)		(Japan) Ryukyu Erythrina
2	FW	Masato Suzuki	8 June 1991 (aged 25)		(Japan) Tokyo Lequios BS
3	MF	Shotaro Haraguchi	26 March 1987 (aged 30)		(Japan) Tokyo Verdy BS
4	FW	Shusei Yamauchi	9 September 1985 (aged 31)		(Japan) Ryukyu Erythrina
5	MF	Tomoyuki Iino	29 January 1985 (aged 32)		(Japan) Dorsole Kitakyushu
6	MF	Masayuki Komaki	30 August 1982 (aged 34)		(Japan) Veertien Mie BS
7	DF	Teruki Tabata	16 April 1979 (aged 38)		(Japan) Veertien Mie BS
8	MF	Takaaki Oba	24 December 1992 (aged 24)		(Japan) Tokyo Verdy BS
9	FW	Takuya Akaguma	21 November 1989 (aged 27)		(Japan) Dorsole Kitakyushu
10	DF	Ozu Moreira	21 January 1986 (aged 31)		(Japan) Tokyo Verdy BS
11	FW	Takasuke Goto	4 June 1985 (aged 31)		(Japan) Tokyo Verdy BS
12	GK	Yusuke Kawai	6 May 1988 (aged 28)		(Japan) Tokyo Verdy BS

=== Poland ===
Head coach: Marcin Stanisławski

No.	Pos.	Player	Date of birth (age)	Caps	Club
1	GK	Szymon Gąsiński	8 July 1983 (aged 33)		(Poland) KP Łódź
2	DF	Filip Gac	20 September 1996 (aged 20)		(Poland) Zdrowie Garwolin
3	DF	Michał Łabędzki	24 September 1980 (aged 36)		(Poland) BSCC San Łódź
4	MF	Konrad Kubiak	24 October 1992 (aged 24)		(Poland) Boca Gdańsk
5	MF	Tomasz Lenart	6 January 1981 (aged 36)		(Poland) KP Łódź
6	DF	Jakub Jesionowski	6 July 1989 (aged 27)		(Poland) KP Łódź
7	FW	Witold Ziober	11 July 1987 (aged 29)		(Poland) Grembach Łódź
8	FW	Bogusław Saganowski	6 March 1977 (aged 40)		(Poland) Grembach Łódź
9	MF	Karim Madani	30 November 1992 (aged 24)		(Poland) Boca Gdańsk
10	DF	Dominik Depta	24 September 1986 (aged 30)		(Poland) Hemako Sztutowo
11	FW	Piotr Klepczarek	13 August 1982 (aged 34)		(Poland) BSCC San Łódź
12	GK	Maciej Marciniak	4 March 1991 (aged 26)		(Poland) Grembach Łódź

== Statistics ==
Overall 192 players travelled to the Bahamas to compete in the tournament. Of these players, every member of each squad was registered with a club team in their own country, save for three Portuguese players who play abroad.

Twelve of the sixteen managers were managing their own nation's national team whilst four managed foreign teams in respect to their own nationality. Brazilian managers comprised the most head coaches, with four attending the finals.

Player Statistics

	Name	Nation	DoB/Age	Age difference
Youngest Player	Hamad Diouf	Senegal	30 December 1997 (aged 19)	22 ½ years
Oldest Player	Alan	Portugal	21 June 1975 (aged 41)	22 ½ years

Average age of squads

Average age	Nation(s)
26	Nigeria
27	Senegal
28	Bahamas, Switzerland, Iran, Panama
29	Mexico, Paraguay, Brazil
30	United Arab Emirates, Japan, Poland
31	Ecuador, Italy
32	Portugal, Tahiti
