= 2011 FIFA Beach Soccer World Cup squads =

The 2011 FIFA Beach Soccer World Cup was an international beach soccer tournament held in Ravenna, Italy from 1 September until 11 September 2011. The 16 national teams involved in the tournament were required to register a squad of 12 players; only players in these squads are eligible to take part in the tournament.

The squads were announced one week before the start of the World Cup on 25 August 2011. Overall, 192 players have travelled to Ravenna to play in the World Cup.

== Group A ==
=== Italy ===
Coach: (Italy) Massimiliano Esposito

No.	Pos.	Player	Date of birth (age)	Caps	Club
1	GK	Simone Del Mestre	28 August 1983 (aged 28)	-	-
2	DF	Matteo Marrucci	18 October 1983 (aged 27)	-	-
3	DF	Dario Ramacciotti	4 October 1987 (aged 23)	-	-
4	DF	Michele Leghissa	21 October 1975 (aged 35)	-	-
5	FW	Simone Feudi	5 February 1982 (aged 29)	-	-
6	FW	Franco Palma	7 April 1981 (aged 30)	-	-
7	FW	Sacha Di Tullio	7 January 1988 (aged 23)	-	-
8	FW	Francesco Corosiniti	6 July 1984 (aged 27)	-	-
9	MF	Giuseppe Soria	11 March 1978 (aged 33)	-	-
10	MF	Gabriele Gori	10 October 1987 (aged 23)	-	-
11	MF	Paolo Palmacci	17 May 1984 (aged 27)	-	-
12	GK	Stefano Spada	2 August 1983 (aged 28)	-	-

=== Iran ===
Coach: (Iran) Behzad Dadashzadeh

No.	Pos.	Player	Date of birth (age)	Caps	Club
1	GK	Mohammad Rahaviezabadi	22 March 1986 (aged 25)	-	-
2	DF	Amir Akbari	26 January 1992 (aged 19)	-	-
3	DF	Hassan Abdollahi	11 September 1984 (aged 26)	-	-
4	DF	Mehdi Hassani	29 April 1983 (aged 28)	-	-
5	DF	Ali Naderi	30 April 1980 (aged 31)	-	-
6	FW	Mohammad Mokhtari	4 July 1990 (aged 21)	-	-
7	DF	Mehran Morshedi	6 March 1990 (aged 21)	-	-
8	FW	Farid Boulokbashi	8 June 1983 (aged 28)	-	-
9	FW	Abdollah Sahraei	31 December 1983 (aged 27)	-	-
10	FW	Moslem Mesigar	17 September 1984 (aged 26)	-	-
11	FW	Mohammad Ahmadzadeh	25 November 1986 (aged 24)	-	-
12	GK	Hamed Ghorbanpour	21 September 1984 (aged 26)	-	-

=== Senegal ===
Coach: (Senegal) Amadou Diop

No.	Pos.	Player	Date of birth (age)	Caps	Club
1	GK	Al Seyni Ndiaye	31 December 1989 (aged 21)	-	-
2	DF	Cheikh Ba	21 March 1973 (aged 38)	-	-
3	DF	Diakhate Assane	5 August 1983 (aged 28)	-	-
4	DF	Ngalla Sylla	20 March 1986 (aged 25)	-	-
5	FW	Isaac Thiam	11 November 1989 (aged 21)	-	-
6	DF	Ibrahima Bakhoum	2 January 1981 (aged 30)	-	-
7	MF	Babacar Fall	5 March 1989 (aged 22)	-	-
8	DF	Libasse Diagne	11 February 1981 (aged 30)	-	-
9	FW	Pape Koukpaki	2 April 1979 (aged 32)	-	-
10	MF	Serigne Ndour	6 October 1986 (aged 24)	-	-
11	FW	Ndiaga Mbaye	15 September 1981 (aged 29)	-	-
12	GK	Eymard Diatta	3 March 1984 (aged 27)	-	-

=== Switzerland ===
Coach: (Switzerland) Angelo Schirinzi

No.	Pos.	Player	Date of birth (age)	Caps	Club
1	GK	Nico Jung	9 March 1982 (aged 29)	-	-
2	DF	Samuel Lutz	26 November 1981 (aged 29)	-	-
3	DF	Kaspar Jaeggy	15 May 1984 (aged 27)	-	-
4	DF	Dominik Ziegler	18 April 1983 (aged 28)	-	-
5	MF	Michael Rodrigues	3 May 1990 (aged 21)	-	-
6	MF	Stephan Leu	26 March 1982 (aged 29)	-	-
7	MF	Sandro Spaccarotella	5 August 1982 (aged 29)	-	-
8	DF	Mo Jaeggy	1 January 1983 (aged 28)	-	-
9	FW	Dejan Stankovic	25 August 1985 (aged 26)	-	-
10	MF	Stephan Meier	10 December 1981 (aged 29)	-	-
11	FW	Angelo Schirinzi	5 November 1972 (aged 38)	-	-
12	GK	Valentin Jaeggy	19 October 1986 (aged 24)	-	-

== Group B ==
=== Argentina ===
Coach: (Argentina) Hector Petrasso

No.	Pos.	Player	Date of birth (age)	Caps	Club
1	GK	Cesar Mendoza	10 March 1983 (aged 28)	-	-
2	DF	Agustin Dallera	28 December 1985 (aged 25)	-	-
3	DF	German Spinelli	9 October 1984 (aged 26)	-	-
4	DF	Rodrigo Lopez	8 June 1977 (aged 34)	-	-
5	DF	Luciano Franceschini	4 April 1983 (aged 28)	-	-
6	DF	Matias Galvan	27 December 1981 (aged 29)	-	-
7	MF	Lucas Medero	13 January 1990 (aged 21)	-	-
8	MF	Jonathan Levi	1 May 1986 (aged 25)	-	-
9	FW	Miguel De Ezeyza	8 September 1984 (aged 26)	-	-
10	FW	Javier Vivas	27 May 1985 (aged 26)	-	-
11	FW	Sebastian Larreta	28 March 1986 (aged 25)	-	-
12	GK	Sebastian Polatti	12 April 1989 (aged 22)	-	-

=== El Salvador ===
Coach: (El Salvador) Rudis Gonzalez

No.	Pos.	Player	Date of birth (age)	Caps	Club
1	GK	José Portillo	6 May 1989 (aged 22)	-	-
2	DF	Wilber Alvarado	11 August 1987 (aged 24)	-	-
3	DF	Medardo Lobos	27 February 1983 (aged 28)	-	-
4	DF	Tomás Hernández	28 January 1985 (aged 26)	-	-
5	MF	José Membreño	10 November 1980 (aged 30)	-	-
6	DF	Elias Ramírez	4 April 1982 (aged 29)	-	-
7	FW	Walter Torres	8 May 1991 (aged 20)	-	-
8	MF	Elmer Robles	13 October 1990 (aged 20)	-	-
9	MF	Darwin Ramírez	19 January 1986 (aged 25)	-	-
10	FW	Agustín Ruiz	1 December 1987 (aged 23)	-	-
11	FW	Frank Velásquez	12 February 1990 (aged 21)	-	-
12	GK	Baudilio Guardado	25 October 1988 (aged 22)	-	-

=== Oman ===
Coach: (Oman) Talib Al Thanawi

No.	Pos.	Player	Date of birth (age)	Caps	Club
1	GK	Abdullah Al Qasmi	10 May 1976 (aged 35)	-	-
2	DF	Juma Al Wahaibi	2 March 1980 (aged 31)	-	-
3	DF	Jalal Al Sinani	17 November 1986 (aged 24)	-	-
4	DF	Yahya Al Araimi	1 May 1984 (aged 27)	-	-
5	DF	Nasser Al Mukhaini	22 August 1977 (aged 34)	-	-
6	DF	Khalid Al Rajhi	10 June 1980 (aged 31)	-	-
7	MF	Haitham Al Araimi	6 January 1986 (aged 25)	-	-
8	FW	Yaqoob Al Alawi	8 August 1980 (aged 31)	-	-
9	MF	Faisal Al Bulushi	27 August 1980 (aged 31)	-	-
10	FW	Hani Al Dhabit	15 October 1979 (aged 31)	-	-
11	MF	Ishaq Al Qassmi	10 September 1985 (aged 25)	-	-
12	GK	Harib Showan	3 July 1984 (aged 27)	-	-

=== Portugal ===
Coach: (Portugal) Ze Miguel Mateus

No.	Pos.	Player	Date of birth (age)	Caps	Club
1	GK	Joao Carlos	23 June 1972 (aged 39)	-	-
2	DF	Coimbra	14 April 1986 (aged 25)	-	-
3	MF	Lucio	9 December 1986 (aged 24)	-	-
4	MF	Bruno Torres	21 April 1980 (aged 31)	-	-
5	FW	Jordan	2 July 1991 (aged 20)	-	-
6	MF	Alan	21 June 1975 (aged 36)	-	-
7	FW	Madjer	22 January 1977 (aged 34)	-	-
8	DF	Marinho	27 August 1972 (aged 39)	-	-
9	MF	Bruno Novo	4 May 1982 (aged 29)	-	-
10	FW	Nuno Belchior	9 October 1982 (aged 28)	-	-
11	FW	Duarte	4 May 1990 (aged 21)	-	-
12	GK	Paulo Graça	13 September 1978 (aged 32)	-	-

== Group C ==
=== Nigeria ===
Coach: (Nigeria) Audu Adamu

No.	Pos.	Player	Date of birth (age)	Caps	Club
1	GK	Abdullahi Isa	10 August 1985 (aged 26)	-	-
2	FW	Nelson Nwosu	19 August 1989 (aged 22)	-	-
3	DF	Ogbonnaya Okemmiri	13 June 1986 (aged 25)	-	-
4	DF	Shehu Maijama'a	13 November 1989 (aged 21)	-	-
5	DF	Emmanuel Kyande	25 August 1989 (aged 22)	-	-
6	MF	Victor Tale	9 September 1989 (aged 21)	-	-
7	FW	Isiaka Olawale	11 November 1983 (aged 27)	-	-
8	DF	Azeez Abu	31 May 1994 (aged 17)	-	-
9	MF	Musa Najare	16 January 1992 (aged 19)	-	-
10	MF	Bartholomew Ibenegbu	22 February 1986 (aged 25)	-	-
11	FW	James Okwuosa	14 September 1990 (aged 20)	-	-
12	GK	Olalekan Oladepo	9 October 1991 (aged 19)	-	-

=== Russia ===
Coach: (Russia) Mikhail Likhachev

No.	Pos.	Player	Date of birth (age)	Caps	Club
1	GK	Andrey Bukhlitskiy	7 February 1982 (aged 29)	-	-
2	DF	Yuri Gorchinskiy	5 May 1977 (aged 34)	-	-
3	DF	Roman Zaikin	2 October 1979 (aged 31)	-	-
4	DF	Aleksey Makarov	20 August 1987 (aged 24)	-	-
5	DF	Yuri Krasheninnikov	19 December 1984 (aged 26)	-	-
6	MF	Dmitry Shishin	14 March 1986 (aged 25)	-	-
7	DF	Anton Shkarin	15 November 1982 (aged 28)	-	-
8	DF	Ilya Leonov	21 December 1979 (aged 31)	-	-
9	FW	Egor Shaykov	23 June 1980 (aged 31)	-	-
10	DF	Artur Paporotnyi	28 November 1985 (aged 25)	-	-
11	FW	Egor Eremeev	8 December 1984 (aged 26)	-	-
12	GK	Aleksandr Filimonov	15 October 1973 (aged 37)	-	-

=== Tahiti ===
Coach: (French Polynesia) Teva Zaveroni

No.	Pos.	Player	Date of birth (age)	Caps	Club
1	GK	Jonathan Torohia	22 February 1985 (aged 26)	-	-
2	DF	Steven Bennett	15 June 1975 (aged 36)	-	-
3	DF	Marama Amau	13 January 1991 (aged 20)	-	-
4	DF	Heimanu Taiarui	24 August 1986 (aged 25)	-	-
5	DF	Angelo Tchen	8 March 1982 (aged 29)	-	-
6	MF	Heiarii Tavanae	15 February 1992 (aged 19)	-	-
7	MF	Raimana Li Fung Kuee	10 April 1985 (aged 26)	-	-
8	MF	Tainui Lehartel	27 March 1991 (aged 20)	-	-
9	FW	Naea Bennett	8 July 1977 (aged 34)	-	-
10	FW	Tearii Labaste	19 July 1991 (aged 20)	-	-
11	FW	Teva Zaveroni	10 October 1975 (aged 35)	-	-
12	GK	Franck Revel	18 July 1984 (aged 27)	-	-

=== Venezuela ===
Coach: (Venezuela) Roberto Cavallo

No.	Pos.	Player	Date of birth (age)	Caps	Club
1	GK	César Vazquez	22 September 1973 (aged 37)	-	-
2	DF	Gian Luca Cardone	24 September 1979 (aged 31)	-	-
3	MF	Jose Centeno	22 September 1986 (aged 24)	-	-
4	DF	Ronald Pérez	22 February 1987 (aged 24)	-	-
5	DF	Pablo Ferreira	24 September 1977 (aged 33)	-	-
6	MF	Kevin Camargo	18 August 1984 (aged 27)	-	-
7	DF	Edgard Quintero	30 April 1978 (aged 33)	-	-
8	MF	Francisco Landaeta	8 July 1980 (aged 31)	-	-
9	FW	Marcos Monsalve	6 February 1979 (aged 32)	-	-
10	FW	Pedro Romero	13 April 1989 (aged 22)	-	-
11	MF	Carlos Longa	18 January 1979 (aged 32)	-	-
12	GK	César Fermin	27 May 1982 (aged 29)	-	-

== Group D ==
=== Brazil ===
Coach: (Brazil) Alexandre Soares

No.	Pos.	Player	Date of birth (age)	Caps	Club
1	GK	Mão	6 December 1978 (aged 32)	-	-
2	DF	Anderson	11 August 1983 (aged 28)	-	-
3	FW	Fred	11 February 1989 (aged 22)	-	-
4	DF	Betinho	16 December 1977 (aged 33)	-	-
5	FW	Bruno	29 March 1980 (aged 31)	-	-
6	MF	Jorginho	19 October 1974 (aged 36)	-	-
7	FW	Sidney	19 June 1980 (aged 31)	-	-
8	DF	Souza	27 November 1984 (aged 26)	-	-
9	FW	André	26 May 1977 (aged 34)	-	-
10	MF	Benjamin	29 May 1969 (aged 42)	-	-
11	DF	Buru	14 April 1976 (aged 35)	-	-
12	GK	Leandro	6 May 1985 (aged 26)	-	-

=== Japan ===
Coach: (Japan) Ruy Ramos

No.	Pos.	Player	Date of birth (age)	Caps	Club
1	GK	Shingo Terukina	8 September 1984 (aged 26)	-	-
2	MF	Takashi Arakaki	26 May 1979 (aged 32)	-	-
3	MF	Hirofumi Oda	30 December 1979 (aged 31)	-	-
4	FW	Shinji Makino	29 May 1976 (aged 35)	-	-
5	FW	Teruki Tabata	16 April 1979 (aged 32)	-	-
6	MF	Tomoya Uehara	22 March 1984 (aged 27)	-	-
7	FW	Takeshi Kawaharazuka	1 February 1975 (aged 36)	-	-
8	MF	Masahito Toma	16 March 1981 (aged 30)	-	-
9	MF	Shunta Suzuki	1 January 1984 (aged 27)	-	-
10	FW	Shusei Yamauchi	9 September 1985 (aged 25)	-	-
11	MF	Masayuki Komaki	30 August 1982 (aged 29)	-	-
12	GK	Tomoya Ginoza	2 April 1985 (aged 26)	-	-

=== Mexico ===
Coach: (Mexico) Ramon Raya

No.	Pos.	Player	Date of birth (age)	Caps	Club
1	GK	Hector Robles	24 April 1981 (aged 30)	-	-
2	MF	Angel Rodríguez	21 February 1985 (aged 26)	-	-
3	DF	Christian Fragoso	6 March 1985 (aged 26)	-	-
4	DF	Francisco Cati	18 December 1981 (aged 29)	-	-
5	DF	Benjamin Mosco	2 September 1985 (aged 25)	-	-
6	MF	José Luis Navarrete	12 January 1973 (aged 38)	-	-
7	FW	Antonio Barbosa	13 May 1977 (aged 34)	-	-
8	FW	Jose Cervantes	27 September 1985 (aged 25)	-	-
9	FW	Ricardo Villalobos	2 February 1981 (aged 30)	-	-
10	MF	Gustavo Rosales	26 February 1981 (aged 30)	-	-
11	MF	Morgan Plata	11 December 1981 (aged 29)	-	-
12	GK	Miguel Estrada	11 July 1983 (aged 28)	-	-

=== Ukraine ===
Coach: (Ukraine) Sergiy Kucherenko

No.	Pos.	Player	Date of birth (age)	Caps	Club
1	GK	Vitaliy Sydorenko	22 December 1981 (aged 29)	-	-
2	DF	Sergiy Bozhenko	11 June 1979 (aged 32)	-	-
3	FW	Oleg Mozgovyy	24 March 1982 (aged 29)	-	-
4	DF	Anton Butko	4 February 1981 (aged 30)	-	-
5	DF	Igor Borsuk	6 April 1983 (aged 28)	-	-
6	DF	Andriy Borsuk	16 December 1985 (aged 25)	-	-
7	MF	Maksym Nazarenko	20 October 1983 (aged 27)	-	-
8	MF	Roman Pachev	10 September 1987 (aged 23)	-	-
9	FW	Oleg Zborovskyi	31 March 1982 (aged 29)	-	-
10	FW	Andriy Yevdokymov	29 October 1984 (aged 26)	-	-
11	MF	Oleksandr Korniychuk	13 August 1983 (aged 28)	-	-
12	GK	Volodymyr Gladchenko	14 November 1984 (aged 26)	-	-

== Statistics ==
Player Statistics

	Name	Nation	DoB/Age	Age difference
Youngest Player	Azeez Abu	Nigeria	31 May 1994 (aged 17)	25 years
Oldest Player	Benjamin	Brazil	29 May 1969 (aged 42)	25 years

Average age of squads

Average age	Country(ies)
22	Nigeria
24	El Salvador
25	Iran
26	Argentina, Tahiti
27	Senegal
28	Italy, Switzerland, Ukraine
29	Oman, Mexico, Russia
30	Japan, Portugal, Venezuela
31	Brazil
