= 2012 BSWW Mundialito =

Tournament details
- Host country: Portugal
- Dates: 27 July – 29 July 2012
- Teams: 4 (from 2 confederations)
- Venue(s): 1 (in 1 host city)

Final positions
- Champions: Portugal (4th title)
- Runners-up: Spain
- Third place: Germany
- Fourth place: China

Tournament statistics
- Matches played: 6
- Goals scored: 47 (7.83 per match)
- Top scorer(s): (Portugal) Madjer (7 goals)
- Best player(s): (Portugal) Madjer

The 2012 BSWW Mundialito was a beach soccer tournament that took place at Praia da Rocha, Portimão, Portugal from July 27 to 29. This competition was played in a round-robin format.

== Participating nations ==
- China
- Germany
- Portugal
- Spain

== Final standings ==
Team	Pld	W	W+	L	GF	GA	+/-	Pts
Portugal	3	3	0	0	17	7	+10	9
Spain	3	2	0	1	20	7	+13	6
Germany	3	1	0	2	7	15	−8	3
China	3	0	0	3	3	18	-15	0

clinched tournament championship

== Schedule and results ==
27 July 2012
13:15

Spain	8 - 1	Germany
Juanma 5'; R. Amarelle 9', 14'; D. Pajón 13'; Antonio 25'; Llorenç 30', 30'; Sidi 35'	Report	17' Weirauch

Praia da Rocha, Portimão, Portugal
Referee: (Spain) Ruben Eriz
27 July 2012
14:30

China	2 - 5	Portugal
Han Xo 8'; Cai Wm 24'	Report	1', 16', 26' Madjer; 24' L. Vaz; 25' J. Santos

Praia da Rocha, Portimão, Portugal
Referee: (Portugal) Joaquim Pereira Almeida

28 July 2012
13:15

Spain	8 - 0	China
Juanma 4', 10'; D. Pajón 7', 24'; R. Amarelle 11', 27'; Antonio 15'; Sidi 31'	Report

Praia da Rocha, Portimão, Portugal
Referee: (Portugal) Jose Manuel Teixeira Frontelas
28 July 2012
14:30

Portugal	6 - 1	Germany
Marinho 8', 10'; L. Vaz 13'; P. Graça 25'; Madjer 36'; B. Novo 36'	Report	13' C. Thürk

Praia da Rocha, Portimão, Portugal
Referee: (Portugal) Jose Luis Duarte

29 July 2012
13:15

Germany	5 - 1	China
S. Ullrich 2'; O. Romrig 19'; Weirauch 21', 26'; D. Caste 31'	Report	20' Hao Mh

Praia da Rocha, Portimão, Portugal
Referee: (Portugal) Jose Luis Duarte
29 July 2012
14:30

Portugal	6 - 4	Spain
B. Novo 1', 31'; Madjer 17', 23', 25'; Lucio 21'	Report	12' R. Amarelle; 16' Antonio; 17' D. Pajón; 19' M. Beiro

Praia da Rocha, Portimão, Portugal
Referee: (Spain) Ruben Eriz

== Winners ==
2012 BSWW Mundialito

Portugal
4 title

== Awards ==
Best Player (MVP)
(Portugal) Madjer
Top Scorer(s)
(Portugal) Madjer (7 goals)
Best Goalkeeper
(Portugal) Paulo Graça

== Top scorers ==
7 goals

- (Portugal) Madjer

5 goals

- (Spain) R. Amarelle

4 goals

- (Spain) D. Pajón

3 goals

- (Portugal) B. Novo
- (Spain) Juanma
- (Spain) Antonio
- (Germany) Weirauch

2 goals

- (Portugal) Marinho
- (Portugal) L. Vaz
- (Spain) Sidi
- (Spain) Llorenç

1 goal

- (Portugal) J. Santos
- (Portugal) P. Graça
- (Portugal) Lucio
- (Spain) M. Beiro
- (Germany) O. Romrig
- (Germany) S. Ullrich
- (Germany) D. Caste
- (Germany) C. Thürk
- (China) Hao Mh
- (China) Han Xo
- (China) Cai Wm

== See also ==
- Beach soccer
- BSWW Mundialito
- Euro Beach Soccer League
