= 2013 BSWW Mundialito =

Tournament details
- Host country: Portugal
- Dates: 26 – 28 July 2013
- Teams: 4 (from 2 confederations)
- Venue(s): 1 (in 1 host city)

Final positions
- Champions: Spain (1st title)
- Runners-up: Portugal
- Third place: Italy
- Fourth place: Japan

Tournament statistics
- Matches played: 6
- Goals scored: 37 (6.17 per match)
- Top scorer(s): (Spain) Llorenç (Portugal) Nuno Belchior (5 goals)
- Best player(s): (Portugal) Alan Cavalcanti

The 2013 BSWW Mundialito was a beach soccer tournament that took place at Praia de Canide Norte in Vila Nova de Gaia, Portugal, from 26 July to 28 July 2013. This competition with 4 teams was played in a round-robin format.

== Participating nations ==
- Italy
- Japan
- Portugal (host)
- Spain

== Final standings ==
| Team | Pld | W | W+ | L | GF | GA | +/- | Pts |
|---|---|---|---|---|---|---|---|---|
| Spain | 3 | 2 | 0 | 1 | 10 | 7 | +3 | 6 |
| Portugal | 3 | 2 | 0 | 1 | 13 | 7 | +6 | 6 |
| Italy | 3 | 1 | 0 | 2 | 7 | 12 | –5 | 3 |
| Japan | 3 | 1 | 0 | 2 | 7 | 11 | –4 | 3 |

== Schedule and results ==
26 July 2013
13:05 WEST

| Spain | 5 – 1 | Italy |
|---|---|---|
| Llorenç 19', 32', 34'; Cintas 29'; Pajón 34' | Report | 30' S. Spada |

Praia de Canide Norte, Vila Nova de Gaia, Portugal
26 July 2013
14:20 WEST

| Japan | 1 – 6 | Portugal |
|---|---|---|
| T. Kawaharazuka 26' | Report | 4', 15', 27' N. Belchior; 23' J. Santos; 23' J. Maria; 28' Alan |

Praia de Canide Norte, Vila Nova de Gaia, Portugal

27 July 2013
13:05 WEST

| Spain | 2 – 4 | Japan |
|---|---|---|
| Llorenç 3'; Pajón 29' | Report | 3', 21' S. Yamauchi; 17' Matsuo; 36' Ozu |

Praia de Canide Norte, Vila Nova de Gaia, Portugal
27 July 2013
14:20 WEST

| Portugal | 5 – 3 | Italy |
|---|---|---|
| M. Torres 1'; J. Maria 11'; N. Belchior 18', 31'; B. Novo 21' | Report | 4' G. Soria; 7' F. Corosiniti; 36' D. Ramacciotti |

Praia de Canide Norte, Vila Nova de Gaia, Portugal

28 July 2013
13:05 WEST

| Italy | 3 – 2 | Japan |
|---|---|---|
| D. Ramacciotti 28', 33'; G. Soria 36' | Report | 14' S. Yamauchi; 19' Matsuo |

Praia de Canide Norte, Vila Nova de Gaia, Portugal
28 July 2013
14:20 WEST

| Portugal | 2 – 3 | Spain |
|---|---|---|
| Alan 1'; J. Santos 24' | Report | 4' Llorenç; 24' R. Mérida; 31' Sidi |

Praia de Canide Norte, Vila Nova de Gaia, Portugal

== Winners ==
2013 BSWW Mundialito
Winners:

Spain
First title

== Awards ==
Best Player (MVP)
(Portugal) Alan Cavalcanti
Top Scorer(s)
(Spain) Llorenç
(Portugal) Nuno Belchior
(5 goals)
Best Goalkeeper
(Portugal) Nuno Hidalgo

== Top scorers ==
5 goals

- (Spain) Llorenç
- (Portugal) Nuno Belchior

3 goals

- (Japan) S. Yamauchi
- (Italy) D. Ramacciotti

2 goals

- (Spain) Pajón
- (Portugal) J. Santos
- (Portugal) Alan Cavalcanti
- (Portugal) J. Maria
- (Italy) G. Soria
- (Japan) Matsou

1 goals

- (Spain) Sidi
- (Spain) R. Mérida
- (Spain) Cintas
- (Portugal) B. Novo
- (Portugal) M. Torres
- (Italy) S. Spada
- (Italy) F. Corosiniti
- (Japan) Ozu
- (Japan) T. Kawaharazuka

== See also ==
- Beach soccer
- BSWW Mundialito
- Euro Beach Soccer League
