= 2019 BSWW Mundialito =

Tournament details
- Host country: Portugal
- Dates: 13 – 15 August 2019
- Teams: 4 (from 3 confederations)
- Venue: 1 (in 1 host city)

Final positions
- Champions: Portugal (7th title)
- Runners-up: Senegal
- Third place: Spain
- Fourth place: Japan

Tournament statistics
- Matches played: 6
- Goals scored: 36 (6 per match)
- Top scorer(s): (Portugal) Jordan (4 goals)
- Best player: (Portugal) Jordan
- All statistics correct as of 15 August 2019.

The 2019 BSWW Mundialito was a beach soccer tournament that took place at Praia da Nazaré in Nazaré, Portugal, from 13 August to 15 August 2019. This competition with 4 teams was played in a round-robin format.

== Participating nations ==
- Spain
- Portugal (host)
- Japan
- Senegal (debut)

== Standings ==
| Pos | Team | Pld | W | W+ | WP | L | GF | GA | +/- | Pts |
|---|---|---|---|---|---|---|---|---|---|---|
| 1 | Portugal | 3 | 3 | 0 | 0 | 0 | 15 | 5 | +10 | 9 |
| 2 | Senegal | 3 | 1 | 1 | 0 | 1 | 7 | 11 | −4 | 5 |
| 3 | Spain | 3 | 1 | 0 | 0 | 2 | 8 | 9 | –1 | 3 |
| 4 | Japan | 3 | 0 | 0 | 0 | 3 | 6 | 11 | −5 | 0 |

clinched tournament championship

== Schedule and results ==
13 August 2019
14:45 WEST

| Senegal | 1–7 | Portugal |
|---|---|---|
| Diassy 10' | Report | 3' Belchior; 8' Madjer; 10', 31' Jordan; 18' Von; 28' R. Coimbra; 36' Bruno Torres |

Praia da Nazaré, Nazaré, Portugal
Referee: Torsten Guenther (Germany)
13 August 2019
16:00 WEST

| Spain | 4–2 | Japan |
|---|---|---|
| Arias 18' (pen.); Cintas 24'; Javi Torres 25'; Adri Frutos 27' | Report | 18' Ozu; 26' Tabata |

Praia da Nazaré, Nazaré, Portugal
Referee: Francisco Costa (Portugal)

14 August 2019
17:00 WEST

| Spain | 2–3 | Senegal |
|---|---|---|
| Chiky 34'; Javi Torres 34' | Report | 3' Fall; 22', 33' Diagne |

Praia da Nazaré, Nazaré, Portugal
Referee: Wilson Soares (Portugal)
14 August 2019
18:30 WEST

| Portugal | 4–2 | Japan |
|---|---|---|
| Jordan 17'; Belchior 18' (pen.); Madjer 21'; Von 32' | Report | 11' Okuyama; 17' (pen.) Ozu |

Praia da Nazaré, Nazaré, Portugal
Referee: Torsten Guenther (Germany)

15 August 2019
17:00 WEST

| Japan | 2–3 (a.e.t.) | Senegal |
|---|---|---|
| Kawai 3'; Yamauchi 13' | Report | 6', 15' Diassy; 39' Diagne |

Praia da Nazaré, Nazaré, Portugal
Referee: Francisco Costa (Portugal)
15 August 2019
18:30 WEST

| Portugal | 4–2 | Spain |
|---|---|---|
| Brilhante 1'; Bruno Torres 17'; Jordan 23'; Belchior 27' | Report | 6' Javi Torres; 29' Chiky |

Praia da Nazaré, Nazaré, Portugal
Referee: Torsten Guenther (Germany)

== Winners ==
2019 BSWW Mundialito
Winners:

Portugal
7th title

== Awards ==
Best Player (MVP)
(Portugal) Jordan
Top Scorer(s)
(Portugal) Jordan
(4 goals)
Best Goalkeeper
(Portugal) Elinton Andrade

== See also ==
- Beach soccer
- BSWW Mundialito
- Euro Beach Soccer League
