= 2018 BSWW Mundialito =

Tournament details
- Host country: Portugal
- Dates: 15 – 17 June 2018
- Teams: 4 (from 2 confederations)
- Venue: 1 (in 1 host city)

Final positions
- Champions: Portugal (6th title)
- Runners-up: Spain
- Third place: Japan
- Fourth place: Mexico

Tournament statistics
- Matches played: 6
- Goals scored: 39 (6.5 per match)
- Top scorer(s): (Japan) Takasuke Goto (6 goals)
- Best player: (Portugal) Jordan

The 2018 BSWW Mundialito was a beach soccer tournament that took place at Costa da Caparica in Almada, Portugal, from 15 June to 17 June 2018. This competition with 4 teams was played in a round-robin format.

== Participating nations ==
- Mexico
- Portugal (host)
- Japan
- Spain

== Standings ==
Pos	Team	Pld	W	W+	WP	L	GF	GA	+/-	Pts
1	Portugal	3	1	1	1	0	10	7	+3	6
2	Spain	3	2	0	0	1	14	6	+8	6
3	Japan	3	1	0	0	2	10	12	−2	3
4	Mexico	3	0	0	0	3	5	14	−9	0

clinched tournament championship

== Schedule and results ==
15 June 2018
13:30 WEST

Japan	1–6	Spain
Okuyama 8'	Report	4' Edu; 13', 33' Antonio; 22' (o.g.) Komaki; 28' Adri Frutos; 34' Chiky

Costa da Caparica, Almada, Portugal
15 June 2018
14:45 WEST

Mexico	1–3	Portugal
Mosco 13'	Report	8' R. Coimbra; 8', 17' Bé Martins

Costa da Caparica, Almada, Portugal

16 June 2018
17:30 WEST

Spain	5–2	Mexico
Antonio 1'; Dris 6'; Cintas 11'; Llorenç 22'; Chicky 22'	Report	6' Samano; 7' Torres

Costa da Caparica, Almada, Portugal
Referee: Francisco Costa (Portugal)
16 June 2018
18:45 WEST

Portugal	4–3 (a.e.t.)	Japan
Madjer 3' (pen.), 22'; Joao Gonçalves 24' (pen.); Jordan 36'	Report	7', 22', 25' Goto

Costa da Caparica, Almada, Portugal
Referee: Saverio Bottalico (Italy)

17 June 2018
13:30 WEST

Japan	6–2	Mexico
Okuyama 7', 8'; Goto 8' (pen.), 13', 17'; Komaki 14'	Report	1' Aleman; 12' Vizcarra

Costa da Caparica, Almada, Portugal
Referee: Sergio Soares (Portugal)
17 June 2018
14:45 WEST

Portugal	3–3 (a.e.t.)	Spain
Bé Martins 25'; Jordan 27'; Madjer 32'	Report	27', 31' Edu; 32' Llorenç
Penalties
Madjer (penalty scored); R. Coimbra (penalty scored)	2–1	(penalty missed) Antonio; (penalty scored) Llorenç; (penalty missed) Chiky

Costa da Caparica, Almada, Portugal
Referee: Jude Utulu (Malta)

== Winners ==
2018 BSWW Mundialito
Winners:

Portugal
6th title

== Awards ==
Best Player (MVP)
(Portugal) Jordan
Top Scorer(s)
(Japan) Takasuke Goto
(6 goals)
Best Goalkeeper
(Portugal) Elinton Andrade

== See also ==
- Beach soccer
- BSWW Mundialito
- Euro Beach Soccer League
