= 2016 BSWW Mundialito =

Tournament details
- Host country: Portugal
- Dates: 29 – 31 July 2016
- Teams: 4 (from 2 confederations)
- Venue(s): 1 (in 1 host city)

Final positions
- Champions: Brazil (13th title)
- Runners-up: Portugal
- Third place: United States
- Fourth place: China

Tournament statistics
- Matches played: 6
- Goals scored: 70 (11.67 per match)
- Top scorer(s): (Brazil) Lucão (8 goals)

The 2016 BSWW Mundialito was a beach soccer tournament that took place at Praia de Carcavelos in Cascais, Portugal, from 29 July to 31 July 2016. This competition with 4 teams was played in a round-robin format.

== Participating nations ==
- Portugal (host)
- China
- United States
- Brazil

== Standings ==
Team	Pld	W	W+	L	GF	GA	+/-	Pts
Brazil	3	3	0	0	36	5	+25	9
Portugal	3	2	0	1	30	11	+13	6
United States	3	1	0	2	14	16	–2	3
China	3	0	0	2	2	38	–36	0

== Schedule and results ==
29 July 2016
13:00 WEST

Brazil	8 – 1	United States
Bokinha 6'; Lucão 9'; Datinha 19', 20', 20'; Fernando Ddi 24'; Filipe 31'; Mão 32'	Report	Perera 25'

Praia de Carcavelos, Cascais, Portugal
29 July 2016
14:30 WEST

China	0 – 14	Portugal
	Report	Coimbra 4'; Bruno Novo 5', 22'; Belchior 7', 27'; Torres 14'; Madjer 15', 33'; Alan 17'; Bê Martins 19', 28'; José Maria 30', 31' (pen.), 34'

Praia de Carcavelos, Cascais, Portugal

30 July 2016
13:00 WEST

Brazil	16 – 0	China
Datinha 2' (pen.); Bruno Xavier 9', 22', 23'; Lucão 13', 18', 25', 26', 30', 31'; Filipe 15', 20', 34'; Bokinha 17', 35'; Mauricinho 29'	Report

Praia de Carcavelos, Cascais, Portugal
30 July 2016
14:30 WEST

Portugal	6 – 5	United States
José Maria 7', 34'; Belchior 14', 21'; Bê Martins 19'; Coimbra 22'	Report	J. Santos 2'; Perera 12'; Dos Santos 18'; Canale 30'; Leopoldo 36'

Praia de Carcavelos, Cascais, Portugal

31 July 2016
13:00 WEST

United States	8 – 2	China
Canale 12'; Leopoldo 12'; Perera 14', 16', 24', 28'; Own Goal (Wan Chao) 17'; J. Santos 19'		Wan Chao 3'; Cai Wei Ming 13'

Praia de Carcavelos, Cascais, Portugal
31 July 2016
14:30 WEST

Portugal	4 – 6	Brazil
Bê Martins 2', 6'; Bruno Novo 12'; José Maria 30'		Datinha 6'; Catarino 6'; Bruno Xavier 12', 31'; Lucão 13'; Felipe 29'

Praia de Carcavelos, Cascais, Portugal

== Awards ==
Best Player (MVP)

Top Scorer(s)

Best Goalkeeper

== Top scorers ==
8 goals

- (Brazil) Lucão

6 goals

- (Portugal) José Maria
- (United States) Nick Perera

5 goals

- (Brazil) Datinha
- (Brazil) Bruno Xavier
- (Portugal) Bê Martins

4 goals

- (Brazil) Filipe
- (Portugal) Nuno Belchior

3 goals

- (Brazil) Bokinha
- (Portugal) Bruno Novo

2 goals

- (Portugal) Madjer
- (Portugal) Rui Coimbra
- (United States) Jason Santos
- (United States) Tomas Canale
- (United States) Jason Leopoldo

1 goals

- (Brazil) Mauricinho
- (Brazil) Fernando Ddi
- (Brazil) Mão
- (Brazil) Catarino
- (Brazil) Felipe
- (Portugal) Bruno Torres
- (Portugal) Alan
- (United States) Adriano dos Santos
- (China) Wan Chao
- (China) Cai Wei Ming

== See also ==
- Beach soccer
- BSWW Mundialito
- Euro Beach Soccer League
