= Jim St. Andre =

American soccer player

Personal information
- Date of birth: February 15, 1968 (age 58)
- Place of birth: Seacliff, New York, United States
- Height: 6 ft 0 in (1.83 m)
- Position: Goalkeeper

College career
Years	Team	Apps	(Gls)
1986–1990	Vermont Catamounts		

Senior career*
Years	Team	Apps	(Gls)
1990–1994	Colorado Foxes		
1991–1992	Milwaukee Wave (indoor)	22	(0)
1992–1993	Denver Avalanche (indoor)	5	(0)
1994	Fort Lauderdale Strikers	9	(0)
1995	Wichita Wings (indoor)	0	(0)
1995	New York Centaurs	12	(0)
1996	New York Fever		(0)
1996	New England Revolution	15	(0)

International career
1996–1998	United States (beach)	1	(0)
Medal record
Representing United States
Men's beach soccer
BSWW Mundialito
Gold medal – first place	1998	Figueira da Foz
- * Club domestic league appearances and goals

Jim St. Andre (born February 15, 1968) is an American former professional soccer goalkeeper.

He is best known for being the first starting goalkeeper in the history of the New England Revolution during Major League Soccer's inaugural 1996 season, where he appeared in 15 matches. St. Andre played professionally across multiple U.S. leagues, including the American Professional Soccer League (APSL, later A-League), National Professional Soccer League (indoor), and MLS. He achieved success with the Colorado Foxes, winning APSL championships in 1992 and 1993 while leading the league in goals-against average (GAA) in 1993.

A standout at the University of Vermont, St. Andre set school records with 43 career shutouts, a 0.66 GAA, and a 729:15 scoreless streak, earning third-team All-American honors in 1987 and induction into the UVM Athletic Hall of Fame in 2000.

After retiring from professional soccer, he briefly played for the U.S. National Beach Soccer Team and transitioned into media as a commentator for ESPN (including the 1998 FIFA World Cup) and Fox Sports.

He later became a real estate broker in New York City, affiliated with Compass.

== College ==
St. Andre attended college and played men's soccer at the University of Vermont where over 4 seasons he registered 42 shutouts, 50 wins and a 0.66 career GAA, all school records. He was named to the All-New England list all four seasons with Vermont and was a 1987 third team All-American. He led all NCAA Division I goalkeepers in 1989 with a 0.44 GAA. In 2000, The University of Vermont inducted St Andre into its Athletic Hall of Fame.

== Outdoor soccer ==
After graduating from Vermont, St. Andre trained with Malmö of the Swedish First Division, but was not offered a contract. When he returned to the U.S., he joined the Colorado Foxes of the American Professional Soccer League (APSL) for the 1990 season. While with the Foxes, he shared keeper duties with Mark Dodd. In 1992, they were the top two goalkeepers in the league. Dodd was tops with a 0.97 GAA and St. Andre second with a 1.22 GAA. That year the Foxes won the APSL championship, defeating the Tampa Bay Rowdies 1–0 in the title game. In 1993, St. Andre hit his peak with Colorado when he led the league with a 1.19 GAA. The team won the championship again, defeating the Los Angeles Salsa 3–1 in overtime. In 1994, St. Andre began the season with the Foxes, but transferred to the Fort Lauderdale Strikers. He finished the season with a cumulative 2.17 GAA. In 1995, St Andre played for the New York Centaurs of the A-League, the APSL with a new name. Despite playing for the league's worst team, he finished the season third in the league with a 1.43 GAA.

== Indoor soccer ==
St Andre also played several indoor seasons. In 1991, he joined the Milwaukee Wave of the National Professional Soccer League (NPSL). That year the Wave failed to make the playoffs and St Andre had a league-worst GAA of 12.48. He then spent the 1992–1993 season with the Denver Avalanche. On March 8, 1995, the Wichita Wings signed him.

== Major League Soccer ==
When Major League Soccer began preparations for its first season, it allocated various known players to each of the league's new teams. On February 5, 1996, MLS allocated St Andre to the Revolution. St Andre started in net for the Revolution's inaugural match on April 13, 1996, and became the first player in Revolution history to receive a red card, being sent off in the 90th minute of the game. St Andre played only 15 games for the Revs, attaining a 1.81 GAA, putting him 10th out of 13 keepers in MLS that year. He won 6 games and had 2 shutouts. Fellow Revs keeper Aidan Heaney, on the other hand ranked 7th in the league with a 1.70 GAA in 19 games (8 wins and 4 shutouts). The Revs waived St. Andre on November 7, 1996.

== Beach soccer ==
St Andre played for the United States men's national beach soccer team After his release from the Revolution in November 1996.

In 1998, St. Andre represented the team the Mundialito de Futebol de Praia (Beach Soccer Mundialito), held in Figueira da Foz, Portugal. The United States won the tournament, their only Mundialito title defeating Brazil 3–2 in the semifinals, and claiming the championship with an 8–2 victory over Peru in the final.

St. Andre served as a backup goalkeeper to starter Ruben Fernandez. He appeared in one of the team's six matches and received one yellow card.

== Media work ==
After retiring from playing professionally, St Andre joined ESPN as a studio commentator for the 1998 FIFA World Cup . He has also provided color commentary for Fox Sports and ESPN.

== Honors ==
=== National team ===
United States men's national beach soccer team

- BSWW Mundialito champion: 1998

=== Professional ===
Colorado Foxes

- American Professional Soccer League champion: 1992, 1993

=== Individual ===
- University of Vermont Athletic Hall of Fame inductee (2000)
- Co-Most Valuable Player, Vermont men's soccer team (1989)
- NSCAA Third-Team All-American (1987)
- All-New England selection (1986–1989)
- North Atlantic Conference (NAC) All-Conference First Team (1989)
- Russell O. Sunderland Memorial Trophy (1990)
- APSL Leading Goalkeeper (1.19 GAA, league-best): 1993
  - Career wins by a goalkeeper: 50 (1986–1989)
  - Career shutouts: 43 (second all-time NCAA Division I at retirement)
  - Career goals-against average (GAA): 0.66
  - Longest scoreless streak: 729:15
  - Led NCAA Division I goalkeepers in GAA: 0.44 (1989)
