= 2010 BSWW Mundialito =

Tournament details
- Host country: Portugal
- Dates: August 6 – August 8
- Teams: 4 (from 3 confederations)
- Venue: 1 (in 1 host city)

Final positions
- Champions: Brazil (11th title)
- Runners-up: Portugal
- Third place: Argentina
- Fourth place: United States

Tournament statistics
- Matches played: 6
- Goals scored: 37 (6.17 per match)
- Top scorer(s): (Portugal) Madjer (3 goals) (Brazil) Daniel (3 goals) (Brazil) Sidney (3 goals) (Argentina) De Ezeyza (3 goals)
- Best player: (Portugal) Madjer

The 2010 BSWW Mundialito was a beach soccer tournament that took place at a temporary stadium at Praia da Rocha, Portimão, Portugal from August 6 to 8. This competition was played in a round-robin format.

== Participating nations ==
- Argentina
- Brazil
- Portugal
- United States

== Final standings ==
Team	Pld	W	W+	L	GF	GA	+/-	Pts
Brazil	3	3	0	0	16	3	+13	9
Portugal	3	2	0	1	8	5	+3	6
Argentina	3	1	0	2	8	9	−1	3
United States	3	0	0	3	5	20	−15	0

clinched tournament championship

== Schedule and results ==
6 August 2010
14:00

Brazil	3 – 2	Argentina

Praia da Rocha, Portimão, Portugal
6 August 2010
15:15

Portugal	5 – 1	United States

Praia da Rocha, Portimão, Portugal

7 August 2010
14:00

Brazil	9 – 1	United States

Praia da Rocha, Portimão, Portugal
7 August 2010
15:15

Portugal	3 – 0	Argentina

Praia da Rocha, Portimão, Portugal

8 August 2010
14:00

Argentina	6 – 3	United States

Praia da Rocha, Portimão, Portugal
8 August 2010
15:15

Portugal	0 – 4	Brazil

Praia da Rocha, Portimão, Portugal

== See also ==
- Beach soccer
- BSWW Mundialito
- Euro Beach Soccer League
