= BSWW Mundialito =

- Organiser(s): BSWW
- Founded: 1994
- Region: International (FIFA)
- Teams: 4 (since 2008)
- Current champions: Portugal (8th title)
- Most championships: Brazil (15 titles)
- Website: Mundialito

The BSWW Mundialito, often simply known as Mundialito, is an annual international beach soccer tournament that takes place between few select countries, which are invited to play at the tournament organized by Beach Soccer Worldwide (BSWW). First played in 1994 at Copacabana beach, Rio de Janeiro, Brazil, the competition was reignited in 1997 in Portugal, where it was held ever since until 2022. Few nations have won the tournament, those being only Brazil, Portugal, United States, and Spain.

The first Mundialito competition to consist of club teams took place in March 2011, known as the Mundialito de Clubes.

== Venues ==
The following is a table showing when and where the BSWW Mundialito has been held:

| Year(s) | Country | Locale | Venue |
|---|---|---|---|
| 1994 | Brazil | Rio de Janeiro | Copacabana Beach |
| 1995–1996 | Not held | | |
| 1997–2004 | Portugal | Figueira da Foz | Praia da Claridade |
| 2005–2012 | Portugal | Portimão | Praia da Rocha |
| 2013 | Portugal | Vila Nova de Gaia | Praia de Canide Norte |
| 2014 | Portugal | Espinho | Praia da Baía |
| 2015 | Not held | | |
| 2016–2017 | Portugal | Cascais | Praia de Carcavelos |
| 2018 | Portugal | Almada | Costa da Caparica |
| 2019 | Portugal | Nazaré | Praia da Nazaré |
| 2020–2021 | Not held (due to the COVID-19 pandemic) | | |
| 2022 | Spain | Maspalomas | Playa del Inglés |
| 2023 | Spain | Isla Canela | Playa de Los Haraganes |
| 2024–2025 | Not held | | |
| 2026 | Spain | El Puerto de Santa María | Plaza de toros de El Puerto |

== Tournaments ==
| No. | Year | Teams | Winners (gold) | Runners-up (silver) | Third place (bronze) | Best player | Best goalkeeper | Top goalscorer(s) |
|---|---|---|---|---|---|---|---|---|
| 1 | 1994 | 4 | Brazil | Italy | United States | ? | (Brazil) Paulo Sérgio | (Argentina) Emilio Commisso |
| 2 | 1997 | 8 | Brazil | Spain | Canada | (Brazil) Neném | ? | (Brazil) Neném |
| 3 | 1998 | 12 | United States | Peru | Brazil | (Portugal) Hernâni | (United States) Ruben Fernandez | (Brazil) Neném |
| 4 | 1999 | 8 | Brazil | Portugal | Uruguay | (Portugal) Hernâni | (Brazil) Paulo Sérgio | (Brazil) Benjamin, (Brazil) Jorginho |
| 5 | 2000 | 8 | Brazil | Portugal | France | (Portugal) Madjer | (France) Franck Zingaro | (France) Eric Cantona, (Spain) Amarelle, (Brazil) Neném |
| 6 | 2001 | 8 | Brazil | Portugal | Spain | (Spain) Amarelle | (Portugal) Zé Miguel | (Brazil) Neném |
| 7 | 2002 | 8 | Brazil | Portugal | Italy | (Portugal) Madjer | ? | (Portugal) Madjer |
| 8 | 2003 | 8 | Portugal | Brazil | Spain | (Spain) Amarelle | (Brazil) Robertinho | (Spain) Amarelle |
| 9 | 2004 | 8 | Brazil | Spain | Italy | (Portugal) Hernâni | (Spain) Roberto Valeiro | (Brazil) Neném |
| 10 | 2005 | 8 | Brazil | Portugal | France | (Portugal) Madjer | (Brazil) Pierre | (Portugal) Madjer |
| 11 | 2006 | 5 | Brazil | Portugal | Argentina | (Brazil) Buru | – | – |
| 12 | 2007 | 6 | Brazil | Portugal | Japan | (Portugal) Madjer | – | (Portugal) Madjer |
| 13 | 2008 | 4 | Portugal | Brazil | Argentina | (Portugal) Madjer | (Brazil) Mão | (Portugal) Madjer |
| 14 | 2009 | 4 | Portugal | Brazil | Spain | (Portugal) Madjer | (Brazil) Mão | (Spain) Amarelle |
| 15 | 2010 | 4 | Brazil | Portugal | Argentina | (Portugal) Madjer | (Argentina) Cesar Mendoza | (Portugal) Madjer, (Brazil) Daniel, (Brazil) Sidney, (Argentina) Miguel De Ezeyza |
| 16 | 2011 | 4 | Brazil | Portugal | Mexico | (Portugal) Madjer | (Portugal) Paulo Graça | (Portugal) Belchior |
| 17 | 2012 | 4 | Portugal | Spain | Germany | (Portugal) Madjer | (Portugal) Paulo Graça | (Portugal) Madjer |
| 18 | 2013 | 4 | Spain | Portugal | Italy | (Portugal) Alan | (Portugal) Nuno Hidalgo | (Portugal) Belchior, (Spain) Llorenç Gómez |
| 19 | 2014 | 4 | Portugal | Japan | Hungary | (Portugal) Jordan Santos | (Portugal) Nuno Hidalgo | (Portugal) Belchior |
| 20 | 2016 | 4 | Brazil | Portugal | United States | (Portugal) Belchior | (United States) Christopher Toth | (Brazil) Lucão |
| 21 | 2017 | 4 | Brazil | Portugal | Russia | (Brazil) Rodrigo | (Brazil) Mão | (Brazil) Rodrigo, (Brazil) Mauricinho |
| 22 | 2018 | 4 | Portugal | Spain | Japan | (Portugal) Jordan Santos | (Portugal) Elinton Andrade | (Japan) Takasuke Goto |
| 23 | 2019 | 4 | Portugal | Senegal | Spain | (Portugal) Jordan Santos | (Portugal) Elinton Andrade | (Portugal) Jordan Santos |
| 24 | 2022 | 4 | Spain | United States | Portugal | (Spain) Chiky Ardil | (United States) Christopher Toth | (Japan) Takuya Akaguma |
| 25 | 2023 | 4 | Brazil | United Arab Emirates | Spain | (Brazil) Rodrigo | (Spain) Dona | (Brazil) Rodrigo |
| 26 | 2026 | 4 | Portugal | Brazil | Spain | (Portugal) Rúben Brilhante | (Spain) Pablo López | (Spain) Chiky Ardil |

== Medal summary ==
| Rank | Nation | Gold | Silver | Bronze | Total |
|---|---|---|---|---|---|
| 1 | Brazil | 15 | 4 | 1 | 20 |
| 2 | Portugal | 8 | 12 | 1 | 21 |
| 3 | Spain | 2 | 4 | 6 | 12 |
| 4 | United States | 1 | 1 | 2 | 4 |
| 5 | Italy | 0 | 1 | 3 | 4 |
| 6 | Japan | 0 | 1 | 2 | 3 |
| 7 | Peru | 0 | 1 | 0 | 1 |
| 7 | Senegal | 0 | 1 | 0 | 1 |
| 7 | United Arab Emirates | 0 | 1 | 0 | 1 |
| 10 | Argentina | 0 | 0 | 3 | 3 |
| 11 | France | 0 | 0 | 2 | 2 |
| 12 | Canada | 0 | 0 | 1 | 1 |
| 12 | Germany | 0 | 0 | 1 | 1 |
| 12 | Hungary | 0 | 0 | 1 | 1 |
| 12 | Mexico | 0 | 0 | 1 | 1 |
| 12 | Russia | 0 | 0 | 1 | 1 |
| 12 | Uruguay | 0 | 0 | 1 | 1 |
| Totals (17 entries) | | 26 | 26 | 26 | 78 |
