= Łabędzki =

Łabędzki, feminine: Łabędzka is a Polish surname. Notable people with the surname include:

- Adam Łabędzki, Polish motorcycle speedway rider
- Halina Łabędzka (1905–1985), Polish film actress
- Michał Łabędzki, Polish professional footballer
