= 2017 BSWW Mundialito =

Tournament details
- Host country: Portugal
- Dates: 21 – 23 July 2017
- Teams: 4 (from 2 confederations)
- Venue: 1 (in 1 host city)

Final positions
- Champions: Brazil (14th title)
- Runners-up: Portugal
- Third place: Russia
- Fourth place: France

Tournament statistics
- Matches played: 6
- Goals scored: 48 (8 per match)
- Top scorer(s): (Brazil) Rodrigo (Brazil) Mauricinho (5 goals)
- Best player: (Brazil) Rodrigo

The 2017 BSWW Mundialito is a beach soccer tournament that takes place at Praia de Carcavelos in Cascais, Portugal, from 21 July to 23 July 2017. This competition with 4 teams was played in a round-robin format.

== Participating nations ==
- Portugal (host)
- Brazil
- France
- Russia

== Standings ==
Team	Pld	W	W+	L	GF	GA	+/-	Pts
Brazil	3	3	0	0	24	8	+16	9
Portugal	3	2	0	1	12	7	+5	6
Russia	3	1	0	2	10	14	−4	3
France	3	0	0	3	2	19	−17	0

== Schedule and results ==
21 July 2017
14:30 WEST

Brazil	9–4	Russia
Catarino 9'; Mauricinho 10', 13', 24' (pen.); Fernando Ddi 25'; Rodrigo 28'; Datinha 30'; Bruno Xavier 32'; Filipe 36'		12' Zharikov; 18' (o.g.) Filipe; 28' Romanov; 34' Paporotnyi

Praia de Carcavelos, Cascais, Portugal
21 July 2017
16:00 WEST

France	0–5	Portugal
		6' Bê Martins; 17', 24', 36' Jordan; 27' Ricardinho

Praia de Carcavelos, Cascais, Portugal

22 July 2017
14:30 WEST

Brazil	9–0	France
Filipe 8'; Rodrigo 9', 13'; Bruno Xavier 15'; Fernando 19' (pen.); Padilha 24'; Lucas 24', 31'; Mauricinho 36'

Praia de Carcavelos, Cascais, Portugal
22 July 2017
16:00 WEST

Portugal	3–1	Russia
Madjer 25'; Bê Martins 29'; Léo Martins 31'		7' Kryshanov

Praia de Carcavelos, Cascais, Portugal

23 July 2017
14:30 WEST

Russia	5–2	France
Kryshanov 4', 36'; Paporotnyi 13', 18'; Shkarin 32'		7' Suares; 34' (pen.) Barbotti

Praia de Carcavelos, Cascais, Portugal
23 July 2017
16:00 WEST

Portugal	4–6	Brazil
Leo Martins 12', 18'; R. Coimbra 19'; Ricardinho 26'		8' Bruno Xavier; 9', 14' Datinha; 9', 34' Rodrigo; 21' Mauricinho; (red card) 28' Catarino

Praia de Carcavelos, Cascais, Portugal

== Winners ==
2017 BSWW Mundialito
Winners:

Brazil
14th title

== Awards ==
Best Player (MVP)
(Brazil) Rodrigo
Top Scorer(s)
(Brazil) Rodrigo
(Brazil) Mauricinho
(5 goals)
Best Goalkeeper
(Brazil) Mão

== See also ==
- Beach soccer
- BSWW Mundialito
- Euro Beach Soccer League
