= Hernâni Neves =

Portuguese footballer and beach soccer player

Hernâni
Personal information
- Full name: Hernâni Madruga Neves
- Date of birth: 2 November 1963 (age 63)
- Place of birth: Mourão, Portugal
- Height: 1.80 m (5 ft 11 in)
- Position: Midfielder

Youth career
- 1980–1981: Juventude Setúbal
- 1981–1982: Vitória Setúbal

Senior career*
Years	Team	Apps	(Gls)
1982–1988	Vitória Setúbal	38	(1)
1985–1986	→ Farense (loan)		
1988–1994	Benfica	33	(1)
1994–1996	Vitória Setúbal	14	(0)
1996–1997	Desportivo Beja	12	(1)
Total		97	(3)

International career
1987–1990	Portugal	2	(0)
1998–2008	Portugal (beach soccer)		
- * Club domestic league appearances and goals

Hernâni Madruga Neves (born 2 November 1963), known simply as Hernâni, is a retired Portuguese football and beach soccer player. In the former, he played as a defensive midfielder.

He amassed Primeira Liga totals of 84 games and two goals over the course of ten seasons, representing in the competition Vitória de Setúbal and Benfica.

== Football career ==
Hernâni was born in Mourão, Évora District, and began his professional career with Vitória de Setúbal. In a career greatly hampered by injuries he only played one solid season as a professional, 1987–88, appearing in 23 out of 38 matches to help the club finish in eighth position and attracting the attention of Primeira Liga and European Cup runner-up S.L. Benfica, which signed him in the subsequent off-season.

On 4 December 1988, Hernâni scored a rare goal, netting for Benfica in a 2–0 home win against former side Setúbal. A fortnight later, after a 2–0 home success against Lisbon neighbours Sporting Clube de Portugal, he tested positive for cocaine, and received a three-month ban. He was a first-team regular in the latter part of the 1989–90 campaign, and played the whole of the 1990 European Cup final, lost 1–0 to AC Milan; he remained with the club for a further four years, but made only six appearances combined.

After a return to Setúbal, where he played 14 games in two seasons, and a spell in the Segunda Liga with C.D. Beja where he reunited with former Vitória teammate Adelino Nunes, Hernâni retired from the game in June 1997 at age 33. He also earned two caps for Portugal, his debut coming on 5 December 1987 in a 0–3 defeat to Italy in the UEFA Euro 1988 qualifiers.

== Beach soccer ==
One year after retiring, Hernâni started appearing for the Portugal beach soccer team, being one of their leading figures for one full decade and winning a total of 14 titles, as well as many other top-three finishes.

From 2006 to 2009, he also played at club level, with Italian side Cavalieri del Mare di Viareggio.

== Football statistics ==
Appearances and goals by club, season and competition
Club	Season	League			Taça de Portugal		Taça da Liga		Europe		Total	
Club	Season	Division	Apps	Goals	Apps	Goals	Apps	Goals	Apps	Goals	Apps	Goals
Vitória de Setúbal	1982–83		2	0								
Vitória de Setúbal	1983–84		8	1								
Vitória de Setúbal	1984–85		5	0								
Vitória de Setúbal	1986–87											
Vitória de Setúbal	1987–88		23	0								
Farense (loan)	1985–86											
Benfica	1988–89		13	1	1	0			3	1		
Benfica	1989–90		14	0	1	0			4	0		
Benfica	1990–91		2	0	1	0			0	0		
Benfica	1991–92		0	0	0	0			0	0		
Benfica	1992–93		3	0	1	0			0	0		
Benfica	1993–94		1	0	1	0			2	0		
Vitória de Setúbal	1994–95		13	0								
Vitória de Setúbal	1995–96		1	0								
Beja	1996–97		12	1								
Career total			97	3	5	0			9	1		

== Honours ==
=== Football ===
- Primeira Liga: 1988–89, 1990–91, 1993–94
- Taça de Portugal: 1992–93; runner-up 1988–89
- Supertaça Cândido de Oliveira runner-up: 1993
- European Cup runner-up: 1989–90

=== Beach soccer ===
- Italian Supercup: 2008

Portugal

- Mundialito: 2003, 2008; runner-up 1999, 2000, 2001, 2002, 2005, 2006, 2007
- FIFA World Cup: 2001; runner-up 1999, 2002, 2005; third place 2003, 2004, 2008
- Euro League: 2002, 2007, 2008; runner-up 2001, 2004, 2005, 2006; third place 1999, 2003
- Euro League Portuguese Event: 2004, 2005, 2006, 2007
- Euro League French Event: 2004, 2005
- Euro League Spanish Event: 2005; runner-up 2006; third place 2007
- Euro League Italian Event: runner-up 2005, 2007; third place 2006
- Copa Latina: 2000; runner-up 1998, 1999, 2001, 2002, 2003; third place 2005
- Pro Tour runner-up: 2001

Individual

- FIFA World Cup: MVP 2001
- Mundialito: MVP 2004

== See also ==
- List of doping cases in sport
