= Paulo Graça =

Portuguese beach soccer player

Personal information
- Full name: Paulo Alexandre Rodrigues da Silva Graça
- Date of birth: September 13, 1978 (age 48)
- Place of birth: Lisbon, Portugal
- Height: 1.86 m (6 ft 1 in)
- Position: Goalkeeper

Team information
- Current team: Sporting CP (beach soccer)
- Number: 12

Youth career
- 1994–1997: Sporting CP

Senior career*
Years	Team	Apps	(Gls)
2001–2003	Ribeira Brava		
2003–2007	Portosantense	24	(0)
2007–2008	Real Massama	2	(0)
2008–2011	Palmelense		
2010–2012	Sporting CP (beach soccer)		

International career
2008–2012	Portugal (beach soccer)	61	(10)
- * Club domestic league appearances and goals

Paulo Graça (born September 13, 1978) is a former Portuguese beach soccer player who represented Portugal in international competitions. His role was a goalkeeper. He retired in 2013 following injury.

== Honours ==
=== Beach soccer ===
==== Country ====
- Portugal
  - FIFA Beach Soccer World Cup third place: 2008, 2009
  - Euro Beach Soccer League winner: 2008, 2010
  - Euro Beach Soccer League runner-up: 2009
  - Euro Beach Soccer League third place: 2011
  - Euro Beach Soccer Cup runner-up: 2010
  - Euro Beach Soccer Cup third place: 2009
  - Euro Beach Soccer League Italian Event runner-up : 2010
  - Euro Beach Soccer League Netherlands Event winner : 2011
  - Euro Beach Soccer League German Event runner-up : 2011
  - Euro Beach Soccer League Spain Event third place : 2012
  - FIFA Beach Soccer World Cup qualification (UEFA) runner-up : 2008, 2011
  - FIFA Beach Soccer World Cup qualification (UEFA) fourth place : 2009
  - Mundialito winner: 2008, 2009, 2012
  - Mundialito runner-up: 2010, 2011

==== Individual ====
- FIFA Beach Soccer World Cup qualification (UEFA) Best Goalkeeper : 2011
- Euro Beach Soccer League Italian Event Best Goalkeeper: 2010
- Mundialito Best Goalkeeper: 2011
- Mundialito Best Goalkeeper: 2012
