= Mário Narciso =

Portuguese footballer

Mário Narciso GOM
Personal information
- Full name: Mário Álvaro Baptista Narciso
- Date of birth: 4 December 1953 (age 72)
- Place of birth: Setubal, Portugal
- Position: Midfielder

Youth career
- 1968–1972: Vitória Setúbal

Senior career*
Years	Team	Apps	(Gls)
1972–1973	Vitória Setúbal	1	(1)
1973–1975	Torreense		
1975–1980	Vitória Setúbal	97	(9)
1976	Toronto Italia		
1976	Toronto First Portuguese		
1980–1981	Amora	28	(8)
1981–1982	Vitória Guimarães	12	(2)
1982–1983	Vitória Setúbal	17	(1)
1983–1984	Sport Benfica e Castelo Branco	25	(5)
1984–1987	G.D. Torralta	50	(8)

Managerial career
- 2013–: Portugal (beach)
- * Club domestic league appearances and goals

Mário Narciso GOM (born 4 December 1953) is a Portuguese former footballer and currently the head coach for the Portugal national beach soccer team.

== Career ==
Narciso began his career at the youth level with Vitória Setúbal in 1968. In 1972, he played in the Primeira Divisão with Vitória Setúbal's senior team. The following season he played in the Segunda Divisão with S.C.U. Torreense, and later returned to Vitória Setúbal where he played for five seasons. In the summer of 1976 he played in the National Soccer League with Toronto Italia. Midway through the 1976 season he played with league rivals Toronto First Portuguese.

In 1980, he played with Amora F.C., and Vitória Guimarães for one season each. In 1982, he returned to former club Vitória Setúbal for a season, and later played with Sport Benfica e Castelo Branco. He would conclude his career in the Segunda Divisão, and Terceira Divisão with G.D. Torralta.

== Managerial career ==
In 2013, he was named the head coach for the Portugal national beach soccer team, and secured two FIFA Beach Soccer World Cups in 2015, and 2019. Along with the rest of the Portuguese technical team, he was made a Grand Officer of the Order of Merit in recognition of his achievements following the 2019 success.
