= Costa da Caparica =

- Civil parish
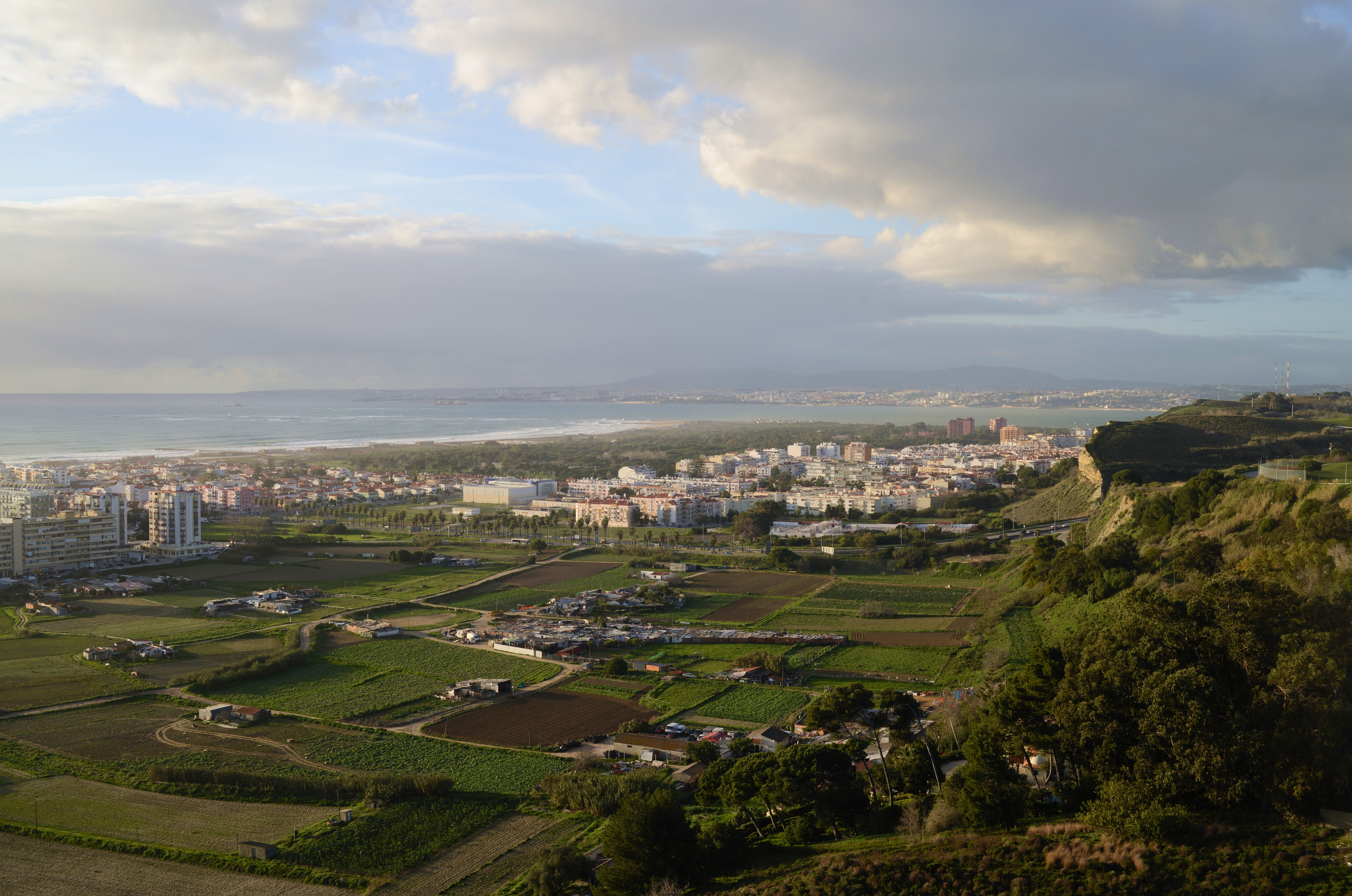
- Panoramic view of Caparica coast

- Location in Portugal
- Coordinates: 38.645°N 9.237°W
- Country: Portugal
- Region: Lisbon
- Metropolitan area: Lisbon
- District: Setúbal
- Municipality: Almada

Area
  - Total: 10.18 km^{2} (3.93 sq mi)
- Elevation: 15 m (49 ft)

Population (2011)
  - Total: 13,418
  - Density: 1,318/km^{2} (3,414/sq mi)
- Time zone: UTC+00:00 (WET)
  - Summer (DST): UTC+01:00 (WEST)
- Postal code: 2829
- Area code: 212
- Patron: Nossa Senhora da Guadalupe
- Website: www.jf-costacaparica.pt

Costa da Caparica (Portuguese pronunciation: [ˈkɔʃtɐ ðɨ kɐpɐˈɾikɐ]) is a Portuguese city and civil parish, located in the municipality of Almada along the western coast of the district of Setúbal. The total population in 2011 was 13,418, in an area of 10.18 km^{2}. Since 9 December 2004, the Costa da Caparica has been designated as cidade (city or town) within the urban hierarchy of Portugal.

== History ==
The toponymy Caparica developed from a legend about an old woman who lived between Almada and the ocean, over cliffs of Sul do Tejo. The old woman, thin and frail, wore a multi-coloured patchwork cape to protect herself from the cold, and who pandered to the local people of the small hamlet in which she lived. Many assumed she was a witch and miser, who guarded a fortune, but who, nonetheless never missed mass (travelling long distances between mountains and valleys while huddling on the side-roads under her cape) and regularly panhandled in the streets. One day, after a long absence, the local villagers went to her humble cabana, where they discovered the body of the old woman within her cape and with a letter to the King. Presented with the letter and her cape, the King was surprised by the old woman's request to have him build a Church for the local people of her village. The King immediately ordered the cape destroyed, but was astonished to see gold coins falling from the cape. With the money he fulfilled the old woman's request from the rich bounty of her cape. From there the name Capa-Rica developed, for capa (cape) and rica (rich), which became associated with the region.

Legend suggests that, in 1800, the Costa da Caparica was the site for the Casa da Coroa (the first house of rock and limestone) which received its importance for a little-known fact. It was believed that King John VI of Portugal in 1824 had eaten a delicious seafood stew, and for that reason, he ordered that the royal coat-of-arms be raised on the local fountain. Similarly, the site was the supposed way-point on journeys involving Queen Maria II of Portugal and King Pedro V of Portugal and his royal consort, who travelled through the Costa da Caparica on unrelated trips.

The territory was part of the parish of Caparica until 1926, before becoming an enclave of Trafaria until 1949. The urban agglomeration was classified as a town on 9 July 1985, and elevated to the status of city on 9 December 2004.

It was the only freguesia in Almada which has not suffered any changes with the administrative reform of 2013.

== Geography ==
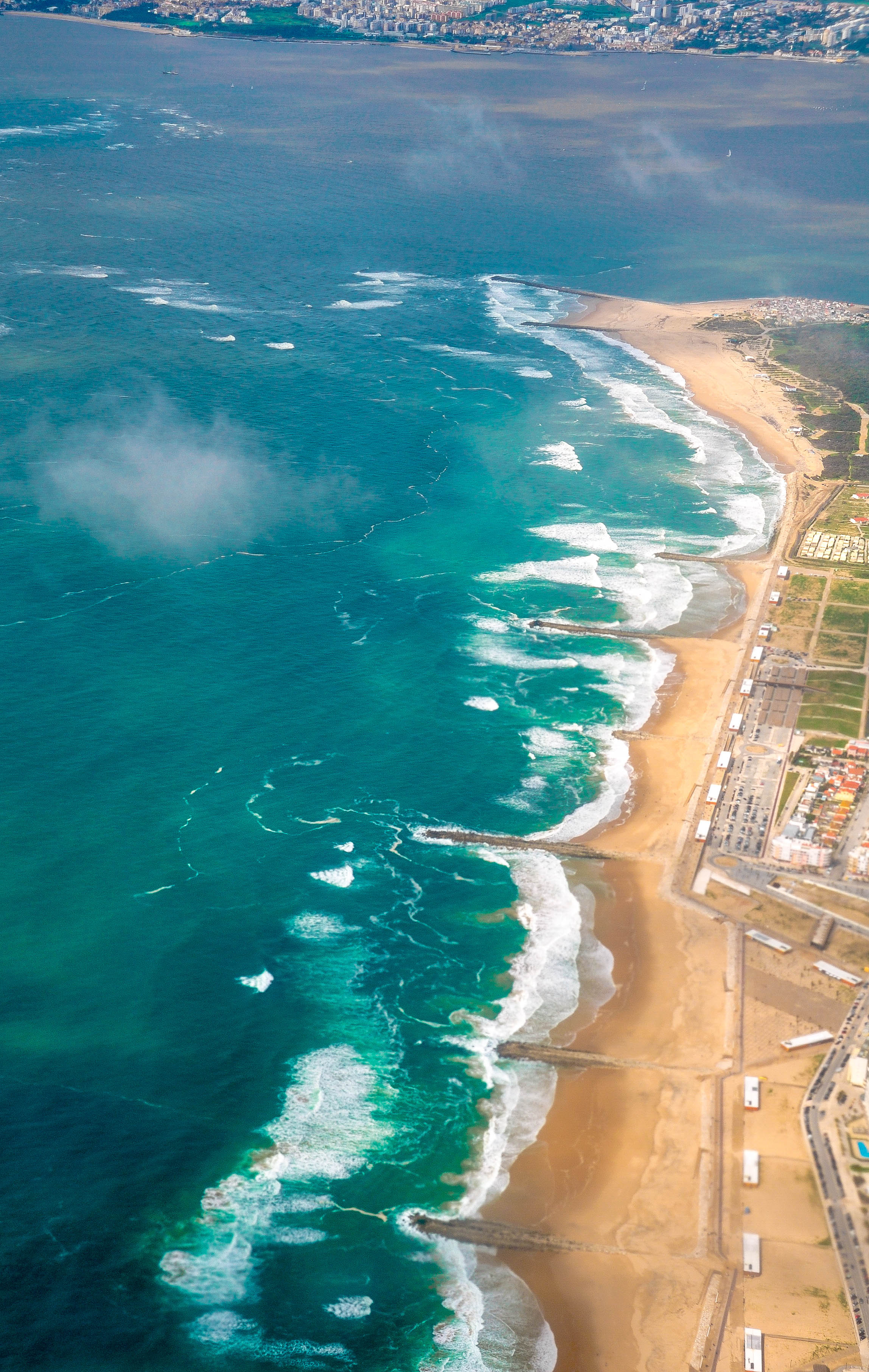
The coast near the mouth of the Tagus River

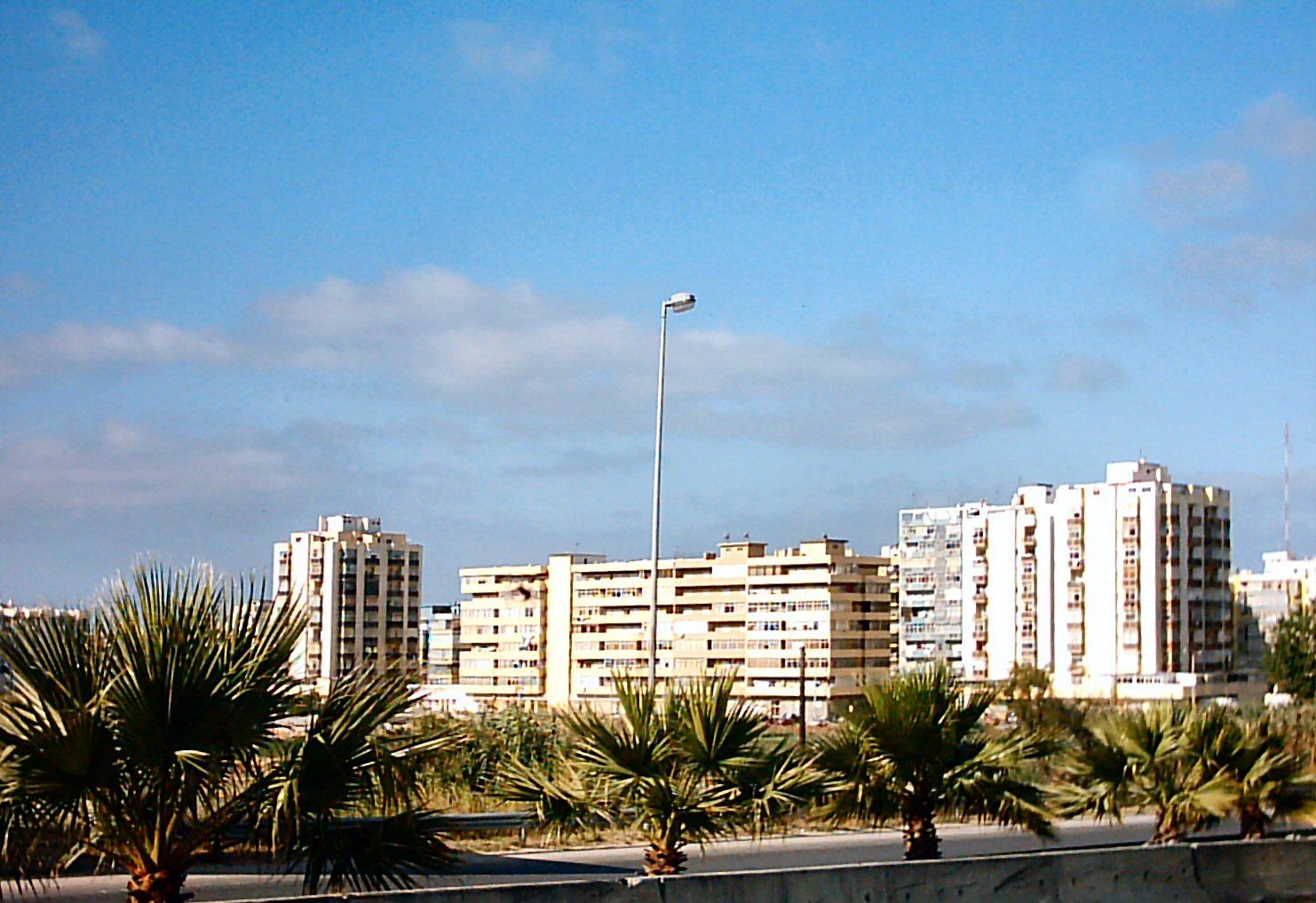
Condominiums and residences in the built-up portion of the parish

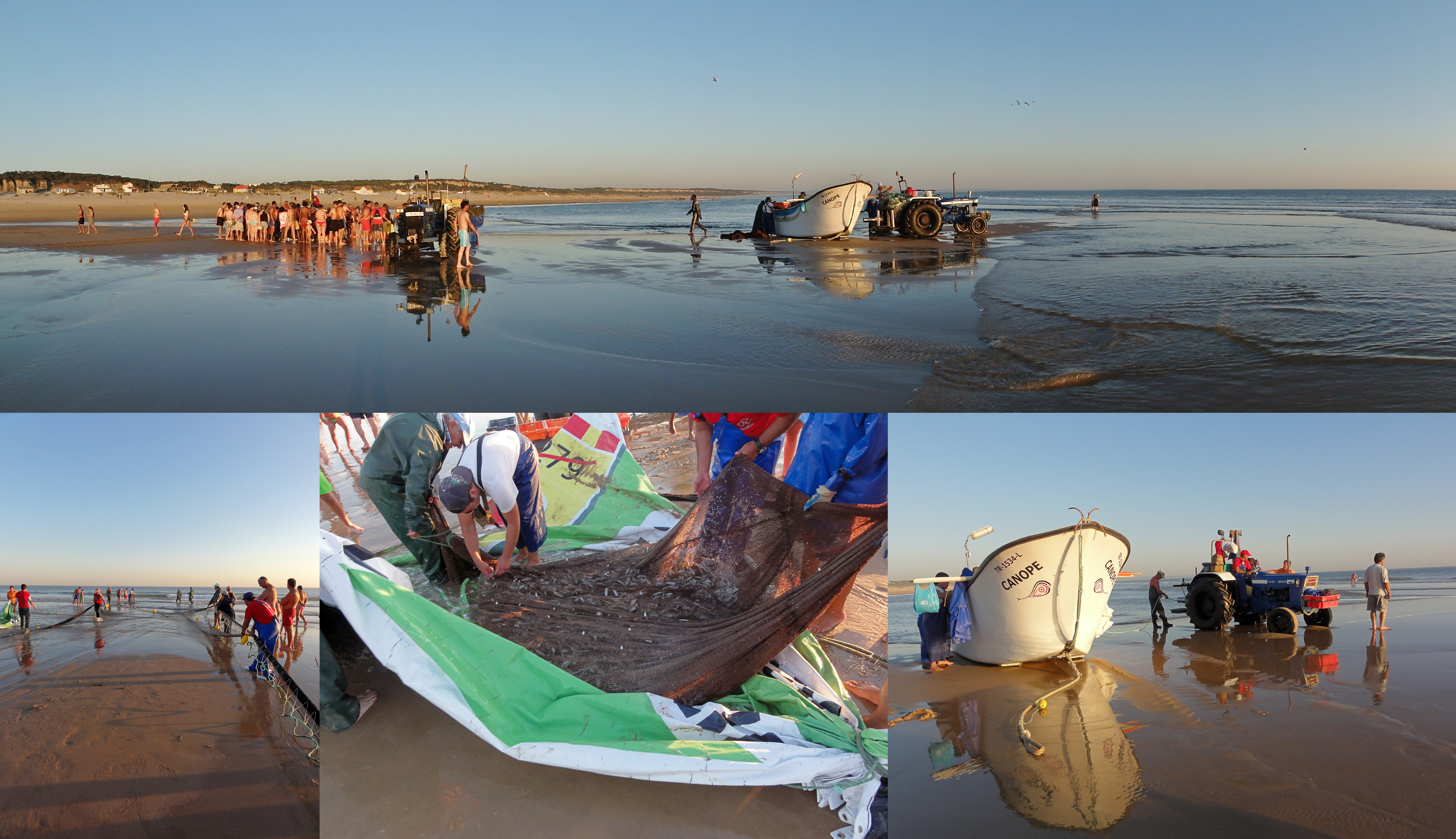
Seine fishing using two tractors and one fishing vessel (sunset 21:18) Praia da Saúde (in English, Beach of Health) Costa da Caparica, next to Almada at 15 km (9.3 mi) of the city of Lisbon in Portugal.

=== Physical geography ===
Situated on the occidental coast of the Peninsula of Setúbal, the territory is the result of ocean receding, covering an area of 10.18 km^{2} between the water and main escarpment. The space is one large beach resulting from progressive decline from the east to the sea. Its coastal extent represents the largest contiguous beach in Portugal, with an expanse of approximately 30 kilometres, from the left margin of the Tagus River to the estuary of Albufeira. Popular in the summer with tourists and local visitors, the beaches have suffered from erosion in recent years; several levels of Portuguese government have taken steps to reduce these patterns, but the erosion has continued at several of the beaches located closest to the mouth of the Tagus.

=== Ecoregions/Protected areas ===
Portugal is bisected by geological and geomorphological landscapes of important interest, both for its scientific and natural appeal, such as the Costa da Caparica Fossil Cliff Protected Landscape (Portuguese: Paisagem Protegida da Arriba Fóssil da Costa da Caparica), a prehistoric beach landscape near Terras da Costa, that consist of intricately carved cliffs and erosional deposits, intersected by ravines and clifftops covered in vegetation. Its relative proximity to urban development and sprawl, coupled with progressive deterioration resulted in the 22 May 1984 decree-law 168/84 that constituted the Paisagem Protegida with the hope of preserving the geomorphological characteristics and the natural communities that existed within the territory, promoting a balance between the biology and landscape. On 24 November 2008, in a Council of Ministers resolution (178/2008) provided a mechanism for safeguarding the resources and natural value, establishing a specific use and management strategy for the area.

Although the Arriba Fóssil is the dominant scenic element of the protected area (PPAFCC), within its limits is the Reserva Botânica da Mata Nacional dos Medos (Botanical Reserve of the National Game Preserve of Medos), also referred to as Pinhal do Rei (the King's Pineforest), on which King John V of Portugal ordered the seeding of lands to reduce dune encroachment and deforestation. Also under the management of the PPAFCC, is the Mata das Dunas da Costa da Caparica e Trafaria (Dunes Game Preserve of Costa da Caprica and Trafaria), at the base of the beach; a 600-hectare (1,500-acre) area of forest, the Mata das Dunas is a natural forest still maintained.

==== Camping ====
The main parks and camping sites in the parish include:

- Parque de Campismo Orbitur
- Parque de Campismo da Costa Nova (Clube de Campismo de Lisboa)
- Parque de Campismo INATEL Caparica
- Praia da Saúde
- Praia da Mata

==== Recreation ====
The Almada Municipality on 26 June 2015 proclaimed Praia da Adiça (38°33′16″N 9°11′19″W) a naturist beach.

=== Human geography ===
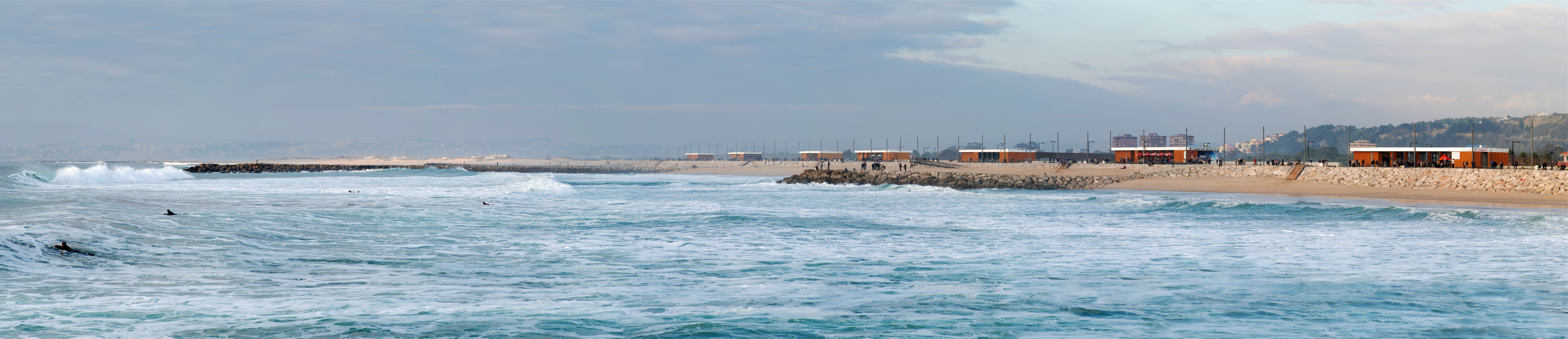
The beach of Costa da Caparica

Although designated a city, and its public administration vested in the civil parish of Costa da Caparica, the area consists of several integrated communities and localities, including São João, Santo António, Terras da Costa and Fonte da Telha. With a population of 11,708 inhabitants, it represents 7.3% of the municipal population. Similarly, it has the largest immigrant population in the population, particularly during the summer (when there are an additional 7,800 residents and on average about 35,000 visitors).

== Economy ==
The importance of the beach and sea is part of what makes the economy of Costa da Caparica function. Until the late 20th century, this was primarily with the fishing industry, but more so, with the seasonal tourist influx.

== Architecture ==
Owing to its modern, tourist-oriented, history, there are few architecturally significant buildings within its borders classified by the Instituto de Gestão do Património Arquitectónico e Arqueológico (IGESPAR); these include:

- 3rd Financial Division building of the municipality of Almada (Portuguese: 3ª Repartição de Finanças do Concelho de Almada na Costa de Caparica)
- Ararat/Residence of Robert Gulbenkian (Portuguese: Casa Ararat / Casa do Sr. Robert Gulbenkian)
- House of the Crown (Portuguese: Casa da Coroa)
- Estate of São Miguel (Portuguese: Quinta de São Miguel)
- Estate of Medos (Portuguese: Quinta dos Medos)

== Culture ==
Much like other Portuguese communities, the communities of Costa da Caparica participate in secular and religious festivities and fairs throughout the year. These include the city's annual festival (January/February), the festival for local popular saints (Portuguese: Festas dos Santos Populares) in June, an arts/crafts and book fairs in July/August, and the artisans' fair on the second Saturday and fourth Sunday of every month (except in July and August). The regions historical ties are also preserved in the Concurso da Caldeirada Pescador (Fish Stew Competition) held in January/February and the Feira de Velharias, held on the third and fifth Sunday of the month and holidays.

== Sport ==
The main sport clubs in the parish include:

- Centro Internacional de Surf
- Associação de Surf da Costa de Caparica (Surf Club and School)
- Grupo Desportivo dos Pescadores da Costa de Caparica
- Grupo Desportivo Terras da Costa
- Sport União Caparica
- Clube Motar da Costa de Caparica
- Núcleo Sportinguista da Costa de Caparica
- Clube dos Amigos do Rugby da Costa de Caparica
