= Praia da Rocha =

Beach in Algarve, Portugal

Coordinates: 37°7′N 8°32′W

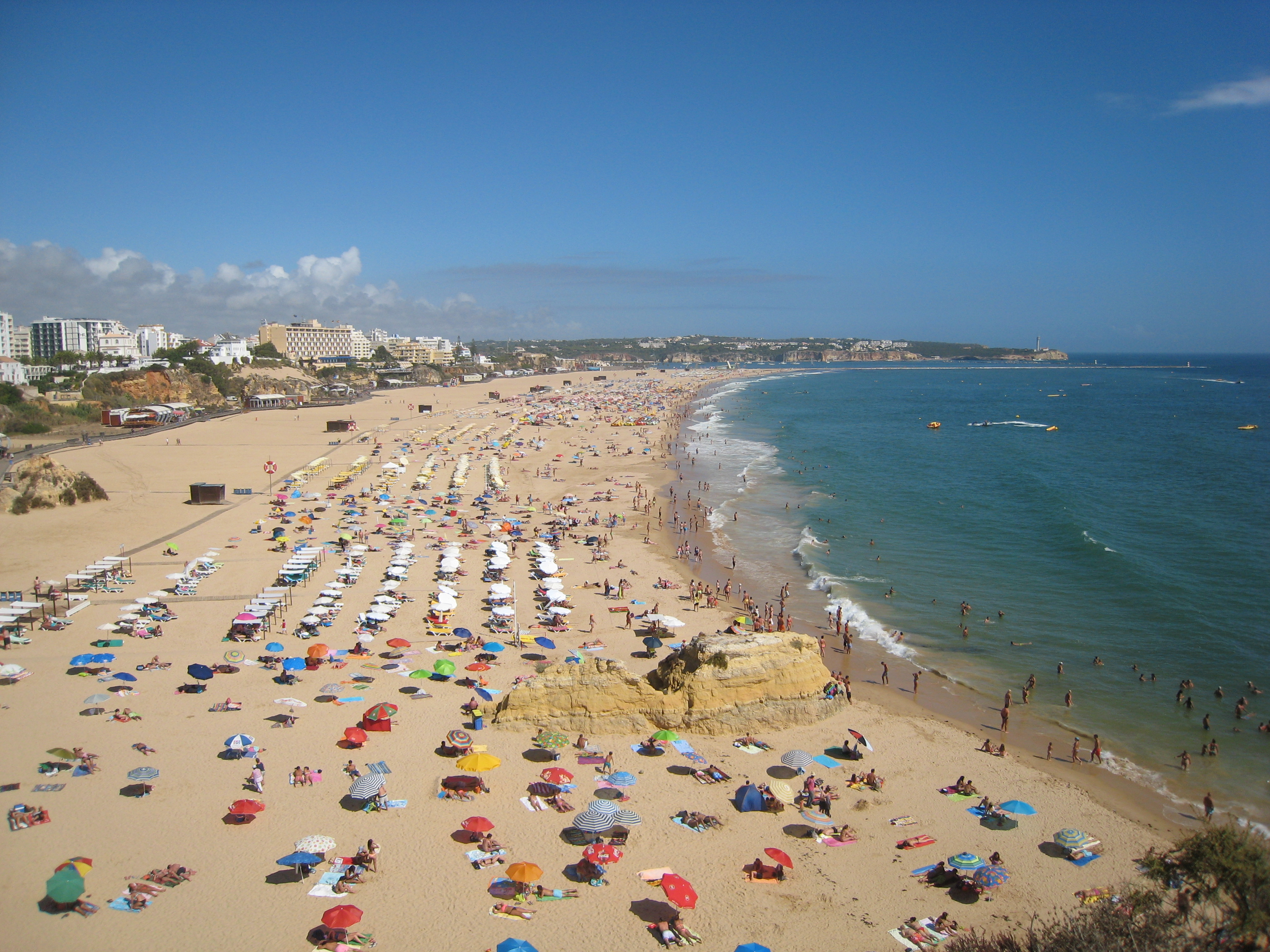
Praia da Rocha town beach

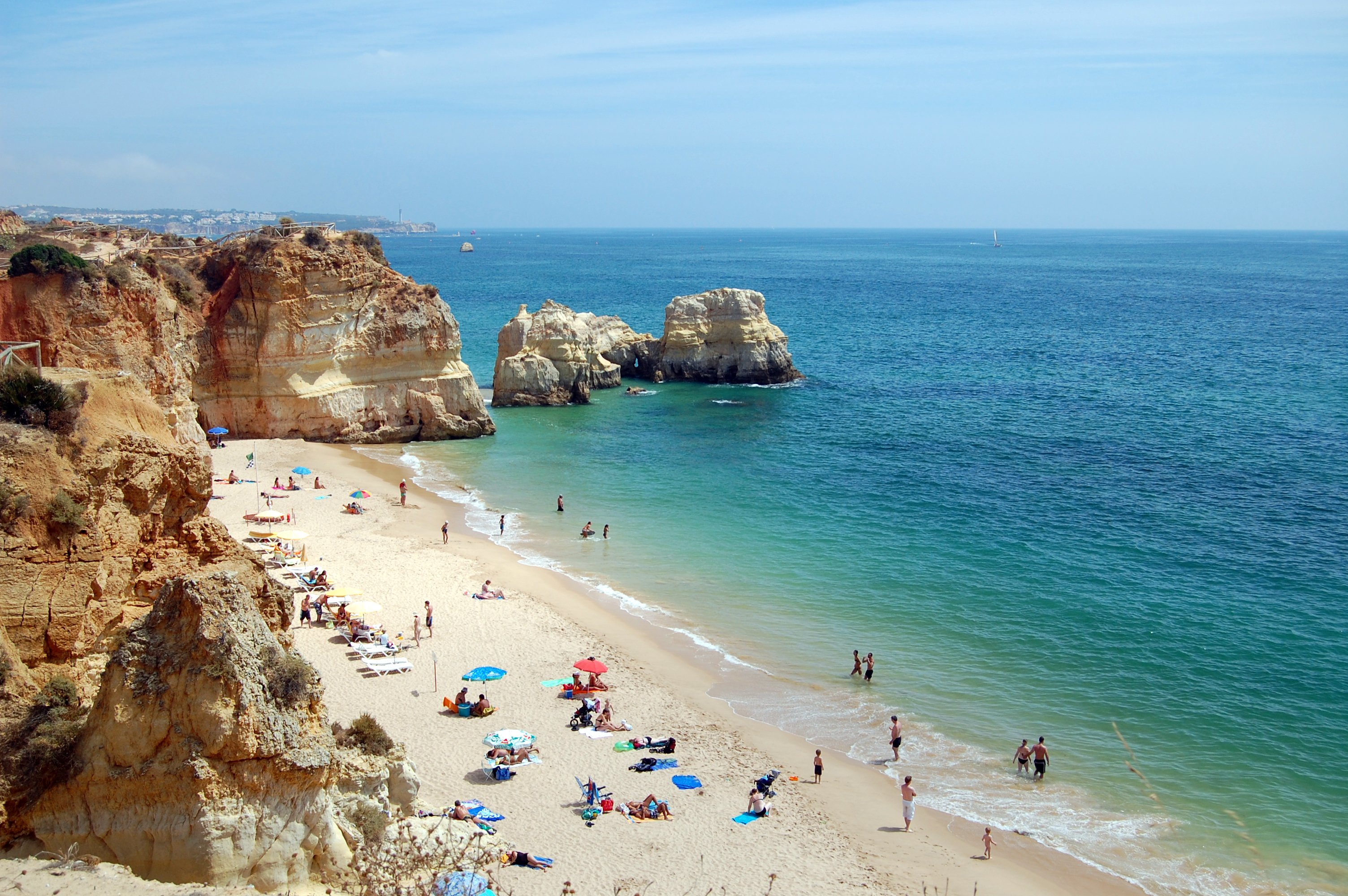
Rock formations visible in the water at the Praia dos Tres Castelos beach, to the immediate west of the Praia da Rocha town beach

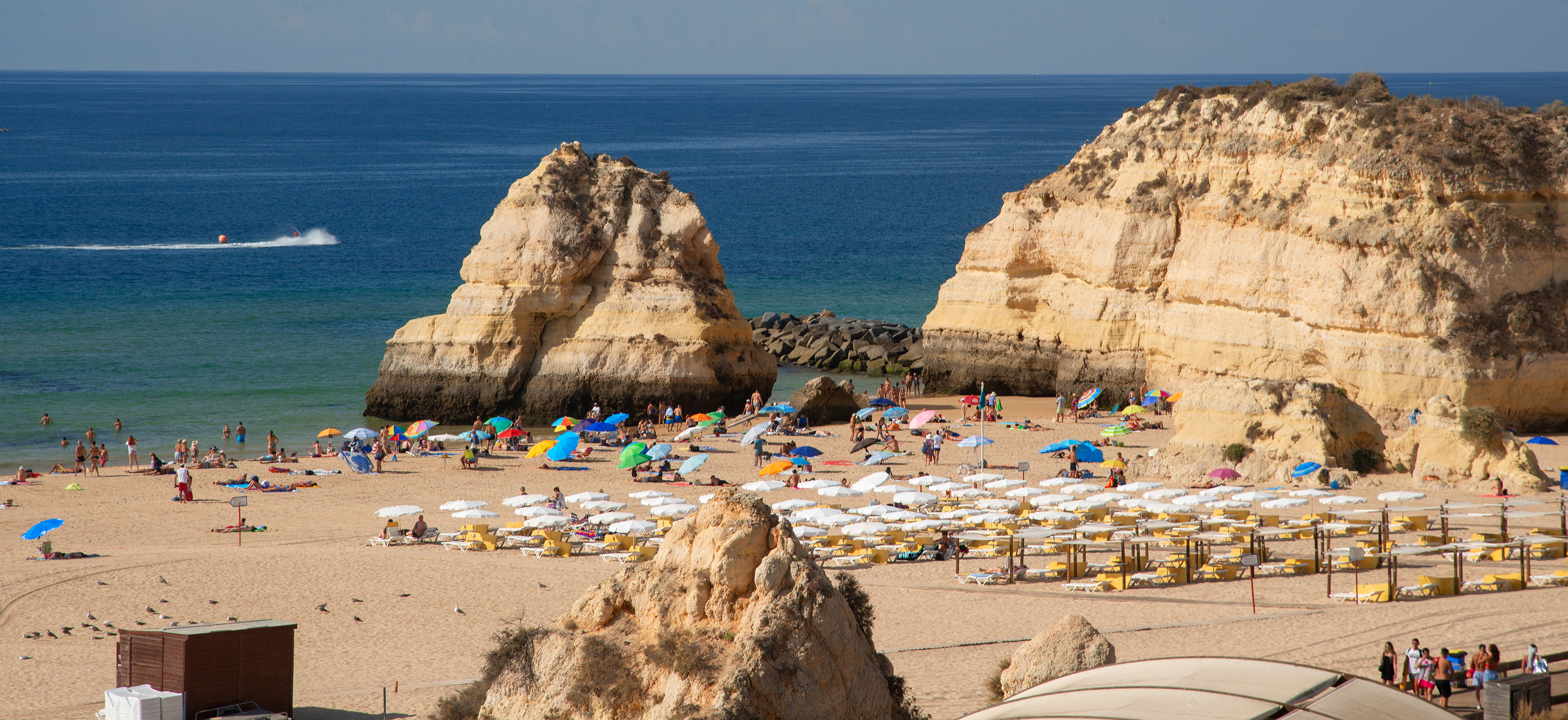
A section of Praia da Rocha, Portimão

Praia da Rocha (English: "Rock Beach") is a beach and built up area on the Atlantic Ocean in the southern section of the concelho of Portimão, Algarve, southern Portugal. On the eastern edge of the beach stands the Fort of Santa Catarina, a 17th century fortress built to defend the mouth of the Arade River, and now a popular tourist attraction accessible directly from the beach or the road above. In summer the beach hosts the Afro Nation music festival, Rolling Loud techno festival and the Secret Project music festival.

To the west of the main beach, Praia dos Três Castelos beach is well known for the bizarre and dramatic limestone rock formations that stand along the water. In some places, the cliffs are sheer and drop straight down to the beach, but in others, erosion has left fanciful shapes likened to castles or pyramids.

The beach soccer tournament, Mundialito de Futebol de Praia, which hosts some of the world's best national teams, took place here annually from 2005 to 2012.

Algarve Tourism lists a number of attractions in the region (including marine and waterparks), as well as the area's restaurants and bars, nightlife and marina complex.

The beach also hosts a hip-hop music festival, Rolling Loud.

== See also ==
- Alvor (Portimão)
- Roman ruins of Quinta da Abicada
