= Ruben Fernandez (soccer) =

American beach soccer player and soccer coach

Personal information
- Place of birth: United States
- Position: Goalkeeper

Team information
- Current team: Irvine Strikers U15 (goalkeeping coach)

Youth career
- Real Avilés

Senior career*
| Years | Team | Apps | (Gls) |
- CF Fuensalida
| –1994 | Atlético Alcorcón | | |
| 1994–1997 | Anaheim Splash (indoor) | 80 | (0) |
| Total | | 80+ | (0+) |

International career
| 1998–1999 | United States (beach) | 5 | (0) |

Managerial career
- United States (beach) (assistant)
- –2017: Godinez Fundamental High School (boys)
- 2017–: Irvine Strikers U15 (goalkeeping coach)
Medal record
Representing United States
Men's beach soccer
BSWW Mundialito
| Gold medal – first place | 1998 | Figueira da Foz, Portugal |
- * Club domestic league appearances and goals

Ruben Fernandez is an American former beach soccer player who represented the United States men's national beach soccer team and later became a association football coach at the high school level in California.

== Playing career ==
From ages 11 to 18, Fernandez trained rigorously, aspiring to a professional soccer career.

He represented the United States men's national beach soccer team in 1998–1999, earning caps in international competitions including the Beach Soccer Copa America and the Beach Soccer World Championships.

One of his notable achievements was contributing to the USA's victory at the 1998 Mundialito de Futebol de Praia (BSWW Mundialito), held in Figueira da Foz, Portugal. The U.S. topped their group, with wins over teams including Italy and Canada, defeated Brazil 3–2 in the semifinals, and won the final 8–2 against Peru to claim the title, marking one of the USA's most significant early international successes in beach soccer.

He was named the tournament's best goalkeeper after recording an accuracy rate of 87% while participating in all five games, conceding just 10 goals.

Fernandez later assisted U.S. beach soccer programs as an assistant coach and talent scout, including tryout camps in Texas.

== Coaching career ==
After retiring from playing, Fernandez transitioned to coaching. He served as head coach for the boys' soccer team at Godinez Fundamental High School in Santa Ana, California, where he led the team to significant success. In 2017, he was named the Orange County Register's Boys Soccer Coach of the Year after guiding Godinez to the CIF Southern Section Division 2 title and the CIF Southern California Regional championship.

He has also worked as an assistant coach for the United States men's beach soccer team. Additionally, Fernandez has been involved in beach soccer training and talent identification events, such as camps in Texas.
