= Michał Łabędzki =

Polish footballer

Personal information
- Full name: Michał Łabędzki
- Date of birth: 24 September 1980 (age 46)
- Place of birth: Łódź, Poland
- Height: 1.84 m (6 ft 1/2 in)
- Positions: Defender; midfielder

Senior career*
Years	Team	Apps	(Gls)
1999–2002	ŁKS Łódź	90	(2)
2002–2003	→ Piotrcovia Piotrków (loan)		
2002–2003	Piotrcovia Piotrków	34	(0)
2003–2006	Pogoń Szczecin	83	(1)
2006	→ ŁKS Łódź (loan)	16	(1)
2006–2007	Górnik Łęczna	13	(2)
2007–2009	Arka Gdynia	53	(1)
2009–2010	Zagłębie Lubin	8	(0)
2010–2012	ŁKS Łódź	59	(0)
2012–2015	Olimpia Grudziądz	108	(0)
2016	Sokół Aleksandrów Łódzki	11	(0)

International career
2016–2017	Poland (beach soccer)	12	(1)
- * Club domestic league appearances and goals

Michał Łabędzki (born 24 September 1980) is a Polish former professional footballer.

== Career ==
At the beginning of his career, he played for ŁKS Łódź. In 2002, he moved to the Piotrcovia Piotrków Trybunalski, which played one season. Then he played for three seasons in Pogoń Szczecin. In 2006, he returned on loan to ŁKS Łódź. In 2006, he joined Górnik Łęczna. Then he played for two seasons in Arka Gdynia. In 2009, he joined Zagłębie Lubin.

In the summer 2010 he moved to ŁKS Łódź.

== Honours ==
Pogoń Szczecin

- II liga: 2003–04

ŁKS Łódź

- I liga: 2010–11

== Notes ==
- Michał Łabędzki at 90minut.pl (in Polish)
