= Alan Cavalcanti =

Portuguese beach soccer player

Alan
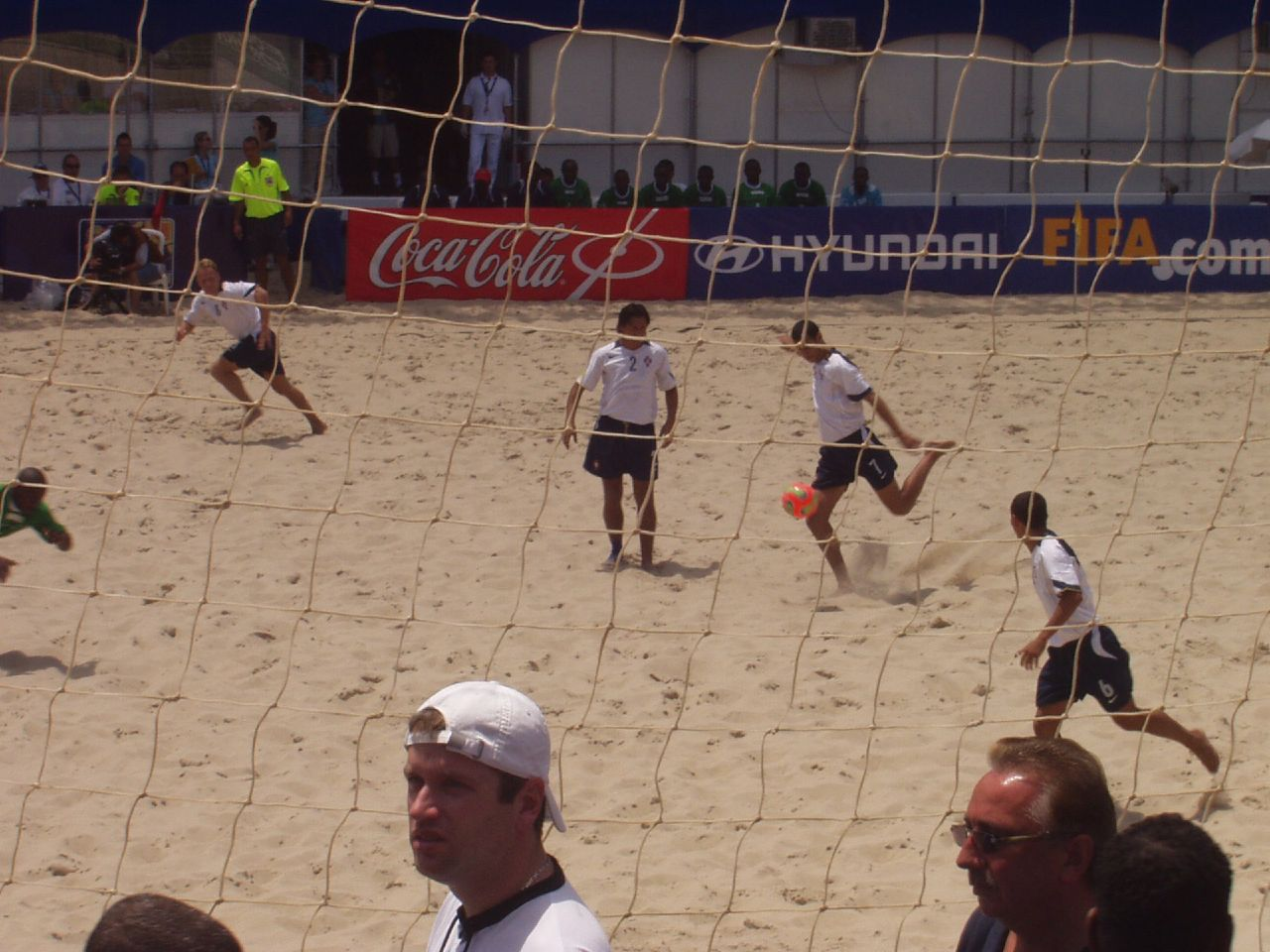

Personal information
- Full name: Alan Cavalcanti
- Date of birth: June 21, 1975 (age 51)
- Place of birth: João Pessoa, Brazil
- Height: 1.74 m (5 ft 9 in)
- Position: Wing

Team information
- Current team: AC Milan (beach soccer)
- Number: 6

Senior career*
Years	Team	Apps	(Gls)
2002–2009	Cavalieri del Mare		
2010–2011	AC Milan (beach soccer)		
2010–2012	Sporting Portugal (beach soccer)		

International career
1998–2018	Portugal (beach soccer)		
- * Club domestic league appearances and goals

Alan Cavalcanti better known as Alan (born 21 June 1975) is a Portuguese beach soccer player born in Brazil. He plays in wing and forward positions.

== Honours ==
=== Beach soccer ===
- Portugal
  - FIFA Beach Soccer World Cup winner: 2001, 2015
  - FIFA Beach Soccer World Cup runner-up: 1999, 2002, 2005
  - FIFA Beach Soccer World Cup third place: 2003, 2004, 2007, 2008, 2009
  - FIFA Beach Soccer World Cup fourth place: 2006
  - Euro Beach Soccer League winner: 2002, 2007, 2008, 2010, 2015
  - Euro Beach Soccer League runner-up: 2001, 2004, 2005, 2006, 2009, 2016
  - Euro Beach Soccer League third place: 1999, 2003, 2011
  - Euro Beach Soccer Cup winner: 1998, 2001, 2002, 2003, 2004, 2006, 2016
  - Euro Beach Soccer Cup runner-up: 1999, 2010
  - Euro Beach Soccer Cup third place: 2005, 2007, 2009
  - FIFA Beach Soccer World Cup qualification (UEFA) runner-up : 2008, 2011
  - FIFA Beach Soccer World Cup qualification (UEFA) fourth place : 2009
  - Mundialito winner: 2003, 2008, 2009, 2012, 2014
  - Mundialito runner-up: 1999, 2000, 2001, 2002, 2005, 2006, 2007, 2010, 2011, 2013, 2016
  - Mundialito fourth place: 2004
  - Copa Latina winner: 2000
  - Copa Latina runner-up: 1998, 1999, 2001, 2002, 2003
  - Copa Latina third place: 2005

==== Individual ====
- FIFA Beach Soccer World Cup Top Scorer Golden Shoe (Top Scorer): 2001
- Euro Beach Soccer League Top Scorer: 2002
- Euro Beach Soccer Cup Fair Play Award: 2006
