= Belchior (footballer) =

Portuguese beach soccer player

Personal information
- Full name: Nuno Ricardo Santos Belchior
- Date of birth: October 9, 1982 (age 44)
- Place of birth: Barreiro, Portugal
- Height: 1.76 m (5 ft 9 in)
- Position: Forward

Team information
- Current team: Sporting CP (beach soccer), AS Roma (beach soccer)

Youth career
- F.C. Barreirense

Senior career*
Years	Team	Apps	(Gls)
2007–2009	Cavalieri del Mare		
2010–2012	Sporting Portugal (beach soccer)		
2010–2011	AS Roma (beach soccer)		

International career
2002–	Portugal		
- * Club domestic league appearances and goals

Nuno Ricardo Santos Belchior better known as Belchior (born 9 October 1982) is a Portuguese beach soccer player. He plays in forward position.

== Honours ==
=== National team ===
- Portugal
  - Euro Beach Soccer League winner: 2007, 2008
  - Euro Beach Soccer League runner-up: 2004, 2005, 2006, 2009
  - FIFA Beach Soccer World Cup winner: 2015, 2019
  - FIFA Beach Soccer World Cup runner-up: 2005
  - FIFA Beach Soccer World Cup third place: 2003, 2004, 2008
  - FIFA Beach Soccer World Cup fourth place: 2006
  - Euro Beach Soccer League Portuguese Event winner : 2004, 2005, 2006, 2007
  - Euro Beach Soccer League Italian Event runner-up : 2005, 2007
  - Euro Beach Soccer League Italian Event third place: 2006
  - Euro Beach Soccer League Spanish Event winner : 2005
  - Euro Beach Soccer League Spanish Event runner-up : 2006
  - Euro Beach Soccer League Spanish Event third place: 2007
  - Euro Beach Soccer League French Event winner : 2004, 2005
  - Copa Latina runner-up: 2003
  - Mundialito winner: 2003, 2008, 2009
  - Mundialito runner-up: 2005, 2006, 2007
  - Mundialito fourth place: 2004

=== Individual ===
- FIFA Beach Soccer World Cup Bronze Shoe: 2008
- FIFA Beach Soccer World Cup Bronze Ball: 2008
- Euro Beach Soccer League French Event Top Scorer: 2004
