= Jordan Santos =

Portuguese beach soccer player

Jordan
Personal information
- Full name: Jordan Alexandre Grilo Santos
- Date of birth: 2 July 1991 (age 35)
- Place of birth: Canada
- Height: 1.76 m (5 ft 9 in)
- Position: Forward

Team information
- Current team: SC Braga
- Number: 5

Youth career
- 2008–2010: SL Marinha (football)

Senior career*
Years	Team	Apps	(Gls)
2010–2013	SL Marinha (football)		(1)
2010–2013	Pataiense (football)		
2013–2014	Os Nazarenos (football)		
2009	ACD "O Sotão"		
2010–2012	Sporting CP		
2013	Os Belenenses		
2014	Braga		
2014–2016	Al-Ahli		
2015–2016	Sporting CP		
2016–2018	Braga		
2018–2019	Spartak Moscow		
2019	Meizhou Hakka		
2019	Yesil Ercis Belediye		
2019–	Braga		

International career^{‡}
2009–	Portugal	103	(95)
- * Club domestic league appearances and goals as of 21 November 2019 ‡ National team caps and goals as of 21 November 2019

Jordan Alexandre Grilo Santos (born 2 July 1991), better known as Jordan, is a Portuguese beach soccer player. He plays as a forward for S.C. Braga and for the Portugal national beach soccer team.

== Career ==
Jordan won the 2019 Mundialito de Clubes with S.C. Braga.
