= Portugal national beach soccer team =

Beach soccer team of Portugal

Portugal
- Nickname: Selecção das Quinas
- Association: Federação Portuguesa de Futebol
- Confederation: UEFA (Europe)
- Head coach: Mário Narciso
- Captain: Rotating (historically Belchior, others)
- Most caps: Madjer (584)
- Top scorer: Madjer (1090)
- FIFA code: POR
- BSWW ranking: 2 ▲1 (2 September 2026) (2 as of 2 June 2025; 3 in latest update with 3133.75 points)
First colours
Second colours

Biggest win
- Portugal 15–0 Moldova (Jesolo, Italy; 2 September 2016)

Biggest defeat
- Brazil 11–2 Portugal (Rio de Janeiro, Brazil 26 March 2000)

World Cup
- Appearances: 20
- Best result: (gold) Champions (2015, 2019)

The Portugal national beach soccer team represents Portugal in international beach soccer competitions, and is controlled by the Portuguese Football Federation (FPF), the governing body for Portuguese football. The team has participated in 20 of the 23 editions of the Beach Soccer World Cup (organised by FIFA since 2005), and its best results are three victories in 2001 (Costa do Sauípe, Brazil), 2015 (Espinho, Portugal), and 2019 (Luque, Paraguay). Alongside Brazil, Portugal is the only team to have won the world title before and after FIFA assumed the government of beach soccer worldwide. In European competitions, Portugal is record holder of titles.

== History ==
Portugal emerged in the late 1990s and early 2000s under Beach Soccer Worldwide (BSWW), winning the 2001 World Championship and multiple podiums pre-FIFA era. Post-2005 FIFA integration, the team secured two World Cup titles (2015 on home soil and 2019), numerous European titles, and consistent top rankings. In 2025, they achieved bronze at the FIFA Beach Soccer World Cup Seychelles, defeating Senegal in the third-place match via penalty from André Lourenço after comebacks.

=== Beach Soccer World Championships (pre-FIFA era) ===
Beach soccer's early global tournaments were organized by BSWW from 1995 to 2004, primarily in Brazil. Portugal quickly rose to prominence, participating consistently and achieving strong results. They finished runners-up in 1999 (losing 5–2 to Brazil) and 2002 (6–5 to Brazil), and claimed third place in 2003 and 2004. The pinnacle came in 2001 at Costa do Sauípe, Brazil, where Portugal won their first world title, defeating France 9–3 in the final. This era established Portugal as one of the sport's elite nations alongside Brazil.

=== FIFA Beach Soccer World Cup (2005–present) ===
FIFA assumed governance of beach soccer in 2005, rebranding the tournament as the FIFA Beach Soccer World Cup. Portugal qualified for nearly every edition (20 of 23 overall as of 2025) and became the only nation besides Brazil to win titles both pre- and post-FIFA.

Key highlights include:

- 2005 (Rio de Janeiro): Runners-up, losing on penalties to France in the final after a 3–3 draw.
- 2006: Fourth place.
- 2008, 2009, and 2011: Third place in each.
- 2015 (Espinho, Portugal – hosted): Champions, defeating Tahiti 5–3 in the final on home soil.
- 2019 (Luque, Paraguay): Champions again, beating Italy 6–4 in the final.
- 2025 (Seychelles): Third place (bronze), with a 3–2 win over Senegal in the third-place match; André Lourenço scored the decisive penalty after Portugal recovered from deficits.

=== UEFA qualifiers for the FIFA Beach Soccer World Cup ===
Since 2008, UEFA has held dedicated qualifiers for the World Cup. Portugal has qualified the most times among European teams (7 occasions), though Spain holds more qualifier titles (4). Notable successes include winning the 2024 qualifier in Cádiz (qualifying for 2025) and runner-up finishes in 2008 and 2010.

=== Madjer ===
João Victor Saraiva, known as Madjer (born 22 January 1977 in Luanda, Angola). Nicknamed after Algerian footballer Rabah Madjer due to his flair and style (starting from age 10 at Estoril Praia), he debuted for Portugal in 1998 and retired in 2019 with Ronaldinho in attendance with him, after a 21-year international career.

- First player to score 1,000 international beach soccer goals (September 2016, in a qualifier vs England).
- Guinness World Record for most goals in FIFA Beach Soccer World Cup history (88 goals across 13 editions, 2005–2019), including a single-tournament record of 21 in 2006.
- Awards: 2 Golden Balls (best player: 2005, 2006), 3 Golden Shoes (top scorer: 2005, 2006, 2008), plus multiple silvers/bronzes.
- Including the 2001 pre-FIFA title, 2015 and 2019 FIFA titles (he played in 2019 at age 42, scoring once).

== Results and fixtures ==
The following is a list of match results in the last 12 months, as well as any future matches that have been scheduled.

Legend

Win Draw Lose Fixture

=== 2025 FIFA Beach Soccer World Cup ===
1 May 2025 FIFA Beach Soccer World Cup GS Group B	Portugal	11–9	Paraguay	Victoria, Seychelles
TBD UTC+4 (Seychelles time)		Report (FIFA)		Stadium: Main Stadium

3 May 2025 FIFA Beach Soccer World Cup GS Group B	Portugal	8–4	Mauritania	Victoria, Seychelles
TBD UTC+4				Stadium: Main Stadium

5 May 2025 FIFA Beach Soccer World Cup GS Group B	Iran	7–5	Portugal	Victoria, Seychelles
TBD UTC+4	(e.g., Nazar Zade early; Portugal equalizer and comeback)	Highlights (YouTube/FIFA)	(Overhead kicks and pressing noted)	Stadium: Main Stadium

8 May 2025 FIFA Beach Soccer World Cup Quarter-final	Portugal	7–6	Japan	Victoria, Seychelles
TBD UTC+4		Highlights (YouTube/FIFA)		Stadium: Main Stadium

10 May 2025 FIFA Beach Soccer World Cup Semi-final	Portugal	2–4	Brazil	Victoria, Seychelles
TBD UTC+4				Stadium: Main Stadium

11 May 2025 FIFA Beach Soccer World Cup Third place play-off	Senegal	3–2	Portugal	Victoria, Seychelles
TBD UTC+4	(e.g., deficits recovered by Portugal; André Lourenço key in comeback)	Highlights (YouTube/FIFA); Report	(Comeback victory; final rocket/shot noted)	Stadium: Main Stadium

Euro Beach Soccer League Superfinal Viareggio 2025

9 September 2025 Euro Beach Soccer League Superfinal Group stage	Portugal	3–4	Belarus	Viareggio, Italy
TBD				Stadium: Main Stadium

10 September 2025 Euro Beach Soccer League Superfinal Group stage	Italy	3–6	Portugal	Viareggio, Italy
18:00 (approx.)	(e.g., Casapieri 12', Fazzini 17', 34', etc.)	Report		Stadium: Main Stadium

12 September 2025 Euro Beach Soccer League Superfinal Group stage	Portugal	4–2	France	Viareggio, Italy
14:00 (approx.)	D. Algarvio 5', 6', Léo Martins 28', 34'	Report (BSWW)	Guerin 4', Gosselin 14'	Stadium: Main Stadium; Referee: Vitalij Gomolko (Lithuania)

14 September 2025 Euro Beach Soccer League Superfinal 5th/6th place match	Portugal	9–3	Switzerland	Viareggio, Italy
TBD				Stadium: Main Stadium

== Coaching staff ==
=== Current coaching staff ===
Head coach: Mário Narciso
Assistant coach: Luís Bilro
Assistant coach: Tiago Reis

=== Managerial history ===
- Mário Narciso

== Team ==
=== Current squad ===
The following is the most recent squad.

Note: Flags indicate national team as defined under FIFA eligibility rules; some limited exceptions apply. Players may hold more than one non-FIFA nationality.

No.	Pos.	Nation	Player
14	GK	POR	Tim (Filipe Alves Santos)
2	FW	POR	P. Marques (Pedro Alexandre Mendes Marques)
22	GK/DF	POR	Diogo Dias
17	FW	POR	Vasco Gonçalves
3	DF	POR	André Lourenço (key scorer in 2025 bronze match)
11	FW	POR	Léo Martins (veteran forward)
—	FW/MF	POR	Alan Cavalcanti
1	GK	POR	Pedro Mano
6	MF	POR	Rodrigo Pinhal
4	DF	POR	Bruno Torres

Head coach: Mário Narciso

== Notable Players ==
=== Notable players ===
- (Portugal) Madjer (1998–2019) — All-time leading scorer (1,090 goals) and caps (584); legendary forward, first to 1,000 international goals, multiple FIFA Golden Balls/Shoes.
- Alan (1998–2015 approx.) — Second all-time top scorer for Portugal; versatile forward, key in early 2000s successes and multiple podiums.
- (Portugal) Belchior (2000s–2010s) — Prolific forward; high FIFA World Cup goal tally (top 10 all-time), vital in 2015 and earlier titles.
- (Portugal) Léo Martins (2010s–present) — Veteran forward; exceptional long-range shooter, frequent top scorer nominee, key in 2015/2019 World Cups and recent campaigns.
- (Portugal) Bê Martins (2010s–present) — Versatile winger/forward; twin brother of Léo, award nominee, standout in Mundialito and European titles.
- (Portugal) Jordan Santos (2010s–present) — Dynamic forward; frequent award nominee (e.g., world best lists), club success with Braga, consistent national team performer.
- (Portugal) André Lourenço (2010s–present) — Defender/fixo; hero of 2025 World Cup bronze (decisive penalty), strong defensive leader in recent qualifiers and finals.
- (Portugal) Bruno Torres (2000s–2010s) — Defender; long-serving squad member, contributed to multiple European and World Cup podiums.
- (Portugal) Elinton Andrade (2000s–2010s) — Goalkeeper/forward hybrid; reliable in big matches, part of golden generation including 2015 title.

These players represent the core of Portugal's success across pre-FIFA (1990s–2004) and FIFA eras (2005–present).

== Competitive record ==
=== FIFA Beach Soccer World Cup ===
FIFA World Cup record										Qualification (UEFA) record								
Year	Round	Pos	Pld	W	W+	L	GF	GA	GD	Round	Pos	Pld	W	W+	L	GF	GA	GD
(Brazil) 2005	Runners-up	2nd	5	3	1	1	27	15	+12	No qualification matches								
(Brazil) 2006	Fourth place	4th	6	4	0	2	43	24	+19	No qualification matches								
(Brazil) 2007	Quarter-finals	8th	4	0	2	2	18	22	−4	No qualification matches								
(France) 2008	Third place	3rd	6	4	1	1	41	22	+19	Runners-up	2nd	7	6	0	1	47	12	+35
(United Arab Emirates) 2009	Third place	3rd	6	4	0	2	32	24	+8	Fourth place	4th	7	5	0	2	47	29	+18
(Italy) 2011	Third place	3rd	6	4	1	1	33	12	+21	Runners-up	2nd	7	5	1	1	37	25	+12
(French Polynesia) 2013	Did not qualify									Round of 16	–	4	2	0	2	21	9	+12
(Portugal) 2015	Champions	1st	6	5	0	1	32	18	+14	Automatically qualified as hosts								
(The Bahamas) 2017	Quarter-finals	8th	4	1	1	2	15	10	+5	Third place	3rd	8	7	0	1	61	14	+47
(Paraguay) 2019	Champions	1st	6	4	1	1	33	20	+13	Fifth place	5th	8	5	1	2	56	21	+35
(Russia) 2021	Group stage	10th	3	1	0	2	14	15	-1	Third place	3rd	6	5	0	1	24	12	+12
(United Arab Emirates) 2024	Quarter-finals	5th	4	2	0	2	16	11	+5	Playoffs	–	4	4	0	0	28	13	+15
(Seychelles) 2025	Third place	3rd	6	5	0	1	38	30	+8	First place	1rd	6	6	0	0	45	15	+30
Total	3 titles	11/12 (approx)	58+	35+	4+	16+	326+	212+	+114+	1 title	8/9	57	45	2	10	366	150	+216

== Medals ==
Last Update: February 2026

Event	Gold	Silver	Bronze	Total
FIFA Beach Soccer World Cup	2	1	4	7
Beach Soccer World Championships	1	2	2	5
FIFA Beach Soccer World Cup qualification (UEFA)	1	2	2	5
Euro Beach Soccer League	9	10	6	25
Euro Beach Soccer Cup	7	3	3	13
BSWW Mundialito	8	12	1	21
Copa Latina (beach soccer)	1	5	1	7
Beach soccer at the European Games	1	0	1	2
Mediterranean Beach Games	0	2	0	2
World Beach Games	0	0	0	0
Beach Soccer Intercontinental Cup	0	1	1	2
Total	30	38	21	89

== Honours ==
FIFA Beach Soccer World Cup
Winners (2): 2015, 2019
Runners-up (1): 2005
Third place (4): 2008, 2009, 2011, 2025
Fourth place (1): 2006

Beach Soccer World Championships (pre-FIFA)
Winners (1): 2001
Runners-up (2): 1999, 2002
Third place (2): 2003, 2004

Euro Beach Soccer League
Winners (9): 2002, 2007, 2008, 2010, 2015, 2019, 2020, 2021, 2024
Runners-up (10): 2000, 2001, 2004, 2005, 2006, 2009, 2013, 2016, 2017, 2022
Third place (6): 1998, 1999, 2003, 2011, 2014, 2018

Euro Beach Soccer Cup
Winners (7): 1998, 2001, 2002, 2003, 2004, 2006, 2016
Runners-up (3): 1999, 2010, 2012
Third place (3): 2005, 2007, 2009

Mundialito
Winners (8): 2003, 2008, 2009, 2012, 2014, 2018, 2019, 2026
Runners-up (12): 1999, 2000, 2001, 2002, 2005, 2006, 2007, 2010, 2011, 2013, 2016, 2017
Third place (1): 2022
Fourth place (3): 1997, 1998, 2004

Copa Latina
Winners (1): 2000
Runners-up (5): 1998, 1999, 2001, 2002, 2003
Third place (1): 2005

European Games
Gold medal (1): 2019
Bronze medal (1): 2015
Fourth place (1): 2023

Other

- FIFA Beach Soccer World Cup – European Qualifier Winners: 2024 (Cádiz)

Mediterranean Beach Games
Beach Soccer Intercontinental Cup
World Beach Games

Awards
Preceded by Portugal national table tennis team	Portuguese Team of the Year; 2015	Succeeded by Portugal national football team
