= Beach Soccer Stars =

Annual award ceremony in beach soccer

- Awarded for: Excellence in beach soccer team and individual achievements
- Presented by: Beach Soccer Worldwide (BSWW)
- First award: 7 November 2014
- Website: BSWW

Television/radio coverage
- Network: Beach Soccer TV
- Runtime: ~75–90 minutes

Beach Soccer Stars is an annual award ceremony in beach soccer organised by the sport's developmental body, Beach Soccer Worldwide (BSWW).

The first edition was held on 7 November 2014 in Dubai, United Arab Emirates. The ceremony continued to take place in the Emirate every year until 2023,^{[a]} occurring after the conclusion of the Beach Soccer Intercontinental Cup during the first week of November^{[b]} and has been called beach soccer's version of the better known Ballon d'Or in association football.

A gala event, attended by many of the world's top current and former players, coaches, officials and other beach soccer figures, five individual prizes are awarded for the best beach soccer player of the year, best goalkeeper of the year, best coach, rising star and best goal. Further awards are presented to the five players that, combined, are deemed to produce a dream team for that season as well as a prize for best event of the year. In 2017, a sixth individual award was introduced for best women's player of the year, a seventh in 2019 to recognise a legendary figure of the sport, and an eighth and ninth in 2023 for best women's goalkeeper and best refereeing figure.

Various parties decide the award winners, including coaches, players, BSWW expert panel and fans. In 2016, coaches and captains from a total of 75 national beach soccer teams voted on the awards, rising to 115 teams in 2021.

The most recent edition, the eleventh, celebrating achievements in 2025, took place on 22 May 2026 in El Puerto de Santa María, Spain.

== Winners ==
There was no ceremony held in 2020 due to the COVID-19 pandemic.

The 2023 edition was delayed until February 2024 to coincide with the scheduling of the 2024 FIFA Beach Soccer World Cup in Dubai.

=== Best player ===
- Decided by: Players and coaches

Fellow national team captains and coaches vote for who they want to be crowned best player of the year. BSWW reveal a shortlist of the three players with the most votes prior to the ceremony. (Note: Note: 2014–16: Voters could choose any player or coach they desired.; 2017–: Voters must choose from a preliminary shortlist of players and coaches picked by BSWW.) On the awards night, the winner of the award with the most votes of the three is revealed as the best player of the year.

Shortlists of three players with most votes ( Award winner ):
| Year | Player | Team |
|---|---|---|
2014
| 2014 | Bruno Xavier | Brazil |
| 2014 | Llorenç Gómez | Spain |
| 2014 | Noël Ott | Switzerland |
2015
| 2015 | Madjer | Portugal |
| 2015 | Bruno Xavier | Brazil |
| 2015 | Heimanu Taiarui | Tahiti |
2016
| 2016 | Madjer | Portugal |
| 2016 | Gabriele Gori | Italy |
| 2016 | Dejan Stankovic | Switzerland |
2017
| 2017 | Mauricinho | Brazil |
| 2017 | Bruno Xavier | Brazil |
| 2017 | Mohammad Ahmadzadeh | Iran |
2018
| 2018 | Llorenç Gómez | Spain |
| 2018 | Bruno Xavier | Brazil |
| 2018 | Datinha | Brazil |
2019
| 2019 | Jordan Santos | Portugal |
| 2019 | Gabriele Gori | Italy |
| 2019 | Rodrigo | Brazil |
2021
| 2021 | Ozu Moreira | Japan |
| 2021 | Philipp Borer | Switzerland |
| 2021 | Léo Martins | Portugal |
2022
| 2022 | Bê Martins | Portugal |
| 2022 | Noël Ott | Switzerland |
| 2022 | Chiky Ardil | Spain |
2023
| 2023 | Rodrigo | Brazil |
| 2023 | Bê Martins | Portugal |
| 2023 | Noël Ott | Switzerland |
2024
| 2024 | Bê Martins | Portugal |
| 2024 | Jordan Santos | Portugal |
| 2024 | Rodrigo | Brazil |
2025
| 2025 | Rodrigo | Brazil |
| 2025 | Thanger | Brazil |
| 2025 | Bê Martins | Portugal |

=== Best goalkeeper ===
- Decided by: Players and coaches

Fellow national team captains and coaches vote for who they want to be crowned best goalkeeper of the year. BSWW reveal a shortlist of the three players with the most votes prior to the ceremony. On the awards night, the winner of the award with the most votes of the three is revealed as the best goalkeeper of the year.

Shortlists of three goalkeepers with most votes ( Award winner ):
| Year | Player | Team |
|---|---|---|
2014
| 2014 | Dona | Spain |
| 2014 | Andrey Bukhlitskiy | Russia |
| 2014 | Peyman Hosseini | Iran |
2015
| 2015 | Jonathan Torohia | Tahiti |
| 2015 | Andrey Bukhlitskiy | Russia |
| 2015 | Elinton Andrade | Portugal |
2016
| 2016 | Elinton Andrade | Portugal |
| 2016 | Vitalii Sydorenko | Ukraine |
| 2016 | Jonathan Torohia | Tahiti |
2017
| 2017 | Peyman Hosseini | Iran |
| 2017 | Mão | Brazil |
| 2017 | Maxim Chuzhkov | Russia |
2018
| 2018 | Elinton Andrade | Portugal |
| 2018 | Mão | Brazil |
| 2018 | Maxim Chuzhkov | Russia |
2019
| 2019 | Maxim Chuzhkov | Russia |
| 2019 | Simone del Mestre | Italy |
| 2019 | Mão | Brazil |
2021
| 2021 | Eliott Mounoud | Switzerland |
| 2021 | Stanislav Kosharnyi | Russia |
| 2021 | Al Seyni Ndiaye | Senegal |
2022
| 2022 | Eliott Mounoud | Switzerland |
| 2022 | Dona | Spain |
| 2022 | Yoao Rolón | Paraguay |
2023
| 2023 | Leandro Casapieri | Italy |
| 2023 | Eliott Mounoud | Switzerland |
| 2023 | Tiago Bobô | Brazil |
2024
| 2024 | Pedro Mano | Portugal |
| 2024 | Eliott Mounoud | Switzerland |
| 2024 | Tiago Bobô | Brazil |
2025
| 2025 | Tiago Bobô | Brazil |
| 2025 | Pedro Mano | Portugal |
| 2025 | Leandro Casapieri | Italy |

=== Best coach ===
- Decided by: Players and coaches

Fellow national team captains and coaches vote for who they want to be crowned best coach of the year. BSWW reveal a shortlist of the three coaches with the most votes prior to the ceremony. On the awards night, the winner of the award with the most votes of the three is revealed as the best coach of the year.

Shortlists of three coaches with most votes ( Award winner ):
| Year | Coach | Team(s) managed |
|---|---|---|
2014
| 2014 | (Russia) Mikhail Likhachev | Russia |
| 2014 | (Switzerland) Angelo Schirinzi | Switzerland; Tahiti |
| 2014 | (Spain) Joaquín Alonso | Spain |
2015
| 2015 | (Portugal) Mário Narciso | Portugal |
| 2015 | (Russia) Mikhail Likhachev | Russia |
| 2015 | (French Polynesia) Tehina Rota | Tahiti |
2016
| 2016 | (Portugal) Mário Narciso | Portugal |
| 2016 | (Switzerland) Angelo Schirinzi | Switzerland; Tahiti; Bahamas |
| 2016 | (Poland) Marcin Stanisławski | Poland |
2017
| 2017 | (Brazil) Gilberto Costa | Brazil |
| 2017 | (Portugal) Mário Narciso | Portugal |
| 2017 | (Iran) Mohammad Mirshamsi | Iran |
2018
| 2018 | (Brazil) Gilberto Costa | Brazil |
| 2018 | (Switzerland) Angelo Schirinzi | Switzerland; (Russia) Kristall (club) |
| 2018 | (Spain) Joaquín Alonso | Spain |
2019
| 2019 | (Brazil) Gilberto Costa | Brazil |
| 2019 | (Spain) Nico Alvarado | Belarus |
| 2019 | (Switzerland) Angelo Schirinzi | Switzerland; (Russia) Kristall (club) |
2021
| 2021 | (Russia) Mikhail Likhachev | Russia |
| 2021 | (Spain) Nico Alvarado | Belarus |
| 2021 | (Switzerland) Angelo Schirinzi | Switzerland; (Russia) Kristall (club) |
2022
| 2022 | (Switzerland) Angelo Schirinzi | Switzerland |
| 2022 | (Brazil) Guga Zloccowick | Saudi Arabia |
| 2022 | (Spain) Ramiro Amarelle | United Arab Emirates |
2023
| 2023 | (Spain) Christian Méndez | Spain; Spain women |
| 2023 | (Italy) Emiliano Del Duca | Italy; Italy women |
| 2023 | (Spain) Llorenç Gómez | Denmark |
2024
| 2024 | (Brazil) Marco Octávio | Brazil |
| 2024 | (Portugal) Bruno Torres | (Portugal) Braga (club) |
| 2024 | (Portugal) Mário Narciso | Portugal |
2025
| 2025 | (Spain) Nico Alvarado | Belarus |
| 2025 | (Italy) Emiliano Del Duca | Italy |
| 2025 | (Portugal) Alan Cavalcanti | Portugal women |

=== Rising star award ===
- Decided by: BSWW panel of experts

Experts at BSWW decide which player will be crowned the best rising star of the year. On the awards night, the winner of the award is revealed. No preliminary shortlist is disclosed.

| Year | Winner | Team | Date of birth & age when awarded |
|---|---|---|---|
2014
| 2014 | Noël Ott | Switzerland | 15 January 1994 (aged 20) |
2015
| 2015 | Bê Martins | Portugal | 29 December 1989 (aged 24) |
2016
| 2016 | Rodrigo | Brazil | 16 August 1993 (aged 23) |
2017
| 2017 | Boris Nikonorov | Russia | 3 April 1989 (aged 28) |
2018
| 2018 | Mohammad Moradi | Iran | 31 August 1996 (aged 22) |
2019
| 2019 | Josep Junior | Italy | 19 May 2000 (aged 19) |
2021
| 2021 | Raoul Mendy | Senegal | 30 December 1992 (aged 28) |
2022
| 2022 | Luca Bertacca | Italy | 4 May 2001 (aged 21) |
2023
| 2023 | Gustav Madsen | Denmark | 17 July 2001 (aged 22) |
2024
| 2024 | Suli Batis | Spain | 15 August 2002 (aged 22) |
2025
| 2025 | Bruno Pola | Portugal | 25 July 2005 (aged 20) |

=== Best five ===
- Decided by: Players and coaches

Fellow national team captains and coaches vote for the five players that they believe, combined, form the best team of the year, similar to the FIFA World XI award in association football. On the awards night, the five winners of the award with the most votes are revealed as the Best Five.

2014–2019
| Year | Players | Team | Position |
|---|---|---|---|
2014
| 2014 | Dona | Spain | Goalkeeper |
| 2014 | Ilya Leonov | Russia | Defender |
| 2014 | Ozu Moreira | Japan | Defender |
| 2014 | Bruno Xavier | Brazil | Midfielder |
| 2014 | Llorenç Gómez | Spain | Forward |
2015
| 2015 | Jonathan Torohia | Tahiti | Goalkeeper |
| 2015 | Heimanu Taiarui | Tahiti | Defender |
| 2015 | Ozu Moreira | Japan | Defender |
| 2015 | Bruno Xavier | Brazil | Midfielder |
| 2015 | Madjer | Portugal | Forward |
2016
| 2016 | Elinton Andrade | Portugal | Goalkeeper |
| 2016 | Ozu Moreira | Japan | Defender |
| 2016 | Bruno Xavier | Brazil | Midfielder |
| 2016 | Madjer | Portugal | Forward |
| 2016 | Dejan Stankovic | Switzerland | Forward |
2017
| 2017 | Mão | Brazil | Goalkeeper |
| 2017 | Bruno Xavier | Brazil | Defender |
| 2017 | Mauricinho | Brazil | Midfielder |
| 2017 | Noël Ott | Switzerland | Forward |
| 2017 | Mohammad Ahmadzadeh | Iran | Forward |
2018
| 2018 | Elinton Andrade | Portugal | Goalkeeper |
| 2018 | Ozu Moreira | Japan | Defender |
| 2018 | Bruno Xavier | Brazil | Defender |
| 2018 | Datinha | Brazil | Midfielder |
| 2018 | Llorenç Gómez | Spain | Forward |
2019
| 2019 | Maxim Chuzhkov | Russia | Goalkeeper |
| 2019 | Ozu Moreira | Japan | Defender |
| 2019 | Jordan Santos | Portugal | Midfielder |
| 2019 | Rodrigo | Brazil | Midfielder |
| 2019 | Gabriele Gori | Italy | Forward |

2021–2026
| Year | Players | Team | Position |
|---|---|---|---|
2021
| 2021 | Eliott Mounoud | Switzerland | Goalkeeper |
| 2021 | Catarino | Brazil | Defender |
| 2021 | Ozu Moreira | Japan | Defender |
| 2021 | Philipp Borer | Switzerland | Midfielder |
| 2021 | Bê Martins | Portugal | Forward |
2022
| 2022 | Eliott Mounoud | Switzerland | Goalkeeper |
| 2022 | Ozu Moreira | Japan | Defender |
| 2022 | Bê Martins | Portugal | Midfielder |
| 2022 | Noël Ott | Switzerland | Forward |
| 2022 | Chiky Ardil | Spain | Forward |
2023
| 2023 | Leandro Casapieri | Italy | Goalkeeper |
| 2023 | Ozu Moreira | Japan | Defender |
| 2023 | Bruno Xavier | Brazil | Defender |
| 2023 | Bê Martins | Portugal | Midfielder |
| 2023 | Rodrigo | Brazil | Forward |
2024
| 2024 | Pedro Mano | Portugal | Goalkeeper |
| 2024 | Bê Martins | Portugal | Defender |
| 2024 | Jordan Santos | Portugal | Midfielder |
| 2024 | Rodrigo | Brazil | Forward |
| 2024 | Léo Martins | Portugal | Forward |
2025
| 2025 | Tiago Bobô | Brazil | Goalkeeper |
| 2025 | Thanger | Brazil | Defender |
| 2025 | Josep Junior | Italy | Defender |
| 2025 | Bê Martins | Portugal | Midfielder |
| 2025 | Rodrigo | Brazil | Forward |

=== Best goal ===
- Decided by: Fans

BSWW allow fans to vote for which goal will be named best of the year through their website. Fans have a shortlist of ten goals to choose from, nominated by BSWW. On the awards night, the winner of the award is revealed.

| Year | Winner | Team | Opponent | Match date | Competition | Video @ |
|---|---|---|---|---|---|---|
2014
| 2014 | Llorenç Gómez | Spain | Switzerland | 16 August 2014 | 2014 Euro Beach Soccer League | Nominees; Winner |
2015
| 2015 | Madjer | Portugal | Switzerland | 16 July 2015 | 2015 FIFA Beach Soccer World Cup | Nominees; Winner |
2016
| 2016 | Nick Perera | United States | China | 31 July 2016 | 2016 Mundialito | Nominees; Winner |
2017
| 2017 | Peyman Hosseini | Iran | Mexico | 27 April 2017 | 2017 FIFA Beach Soccer World Cup | Nominees; Winner |
2018
| 2018 | Eduard Suarez | Spain | Switzerland | 7 September 2018 | 2018 Euro Beach Soccer League | Nominees; Winner |
2019
| 2019 | Rubén Batres | El Salvador | Mexico | 5 August 2019 | 2019 WBG qualifiers (CONCACAF) | Nominees; Winner |
2021
| 2021 | Nicolae Ignat | Moldova | Estonia | 1 August 2021 | 2021 Euro Beach Soccer League | Nominees; Winner |
2022
| 2022 | Chiky Ardil | Spain | Portugal | 23 July 2022 | 2022 Mundialito | Nominees; Winner |
2023
| 2023 | (Brazil) Adriele Rocha | (Spain) Higicontrol Melilla | (Spain) Málaga | 15 June 2023 | 2023 Women's Euro Winners Cup | Nominees; Winner |
2024
| 2024 | Andrea Mirón | Spain | Switzerland | 20 August 2024 | 2024 Women's Euro Beach Soccer League | Nominees; Winner |
2025
| 2025 | Glenn Hodel | Switzerland | Georgia | 19 July 2025 | 2025 Euro Beach Soccer League | Nominees; Winner |

=== Best event ===
- Decided by: BSWW panel of experts

Experts at BSWW decide which competition will receive the prize for best event of the year. On the awards night, the winner of the award is revealed. No preliminary shortlist is disclosed.

| Year | Event winner | Location | Dates of event |
|---|---|---|---|
2014
| 2014 | 2013 Samsung Beach Soccer Intercontinental Cup | Dubai, United Arab Emirates | 19–23 November 2013 |
2015
| 2015 | 2015 FIFA Beach Soccer World Cup | Espinho, Portugal | 9–19 July 2015 |
2016
| 2016 | 2015 Samsung Beach Soccer Intercontinental Cup | Dubai, United Arab Emirates | 3–7 November 2015 |
2017
| 2017 | 2017 FIFA Beach Soccer World Cup | (The Bahamas) Nassau, Bahamas | 27 April – 7 May 2017 |
2018
| 2018 | 2018 Euro Beach Soccer League – Stage 2 / 2018 Women's Euro Beach Soccer Cup | Nazaré, Portugal | 6–8 July 2018 |
2019
| 2019 | 2019 European Games | Minsk, Belarus | 25–29 June 2019 |
2021
| 2021 | 2021 FIFA Beach Soccer World Cup | Moscow, Russia | 19–29 August 2021 |
2022
| 2022 | 2022 El Salvador Beach Soccer Cup | San Luis La Herradura, El Salvador | 14–18 April 2022 |
2023
| 2023 | 2023 NEOM Beach Soccer Cup | Neom, Saudi Arabia | 25–28 October 2023 |
2024
| 2024 | 2025 FIFA Beach Soccer World Cup qualification (UEFA) | Cádiz, Spain | 4–13 October 2024 |
2025
| 2025 | 2025 Euro Beach Soccer League – Stage 2 | (Georgia (country)) Batumi, Georgia | 18–20 July 2025 |

=== Best women's player ===
- Decided by: Players and coaches

New award introduced in 2017.

Fellow national team captains and coaches vote for who they want to be crowned best women's player of the year. BSWW reveal a shortlist of the three players with the most votes prior to the ceremony. (Note: Note: 2017–19: Voters could choose any player they desired.; 2021–: Voters must choose from a preliminary list of players picked by BSWW.) On the awards night, the winner of the award with the most votes of the three is revealed as the best women's player of the year.

Shortlists of three players with most votes ( Award winner ):
| Year | Player | Team |
|---|---|---|
2017
| 2017 | Sarah Kempson | England |
| 2017 | Grytsje Van den Berg | Netherlands |
| 2017 | Leticia Villar (Note: National team not active during the year (Brazil); clubs represented in BSWW competitions for that year are therefore shown instead.) | (Hungary) Astra (club) |
2018
| 2018 | Marina Fedorova | Russia |
| 2018 | Molly Clark | England |
| 2018 | Adriele Rocha | (Poland) Grembach Łódź (club) |
2019
| 2019 | Carolina González | Spain |
| 2019 | Adriele Rocha | Brazil |
| 2019 | Sarah Kempson | England |
2021
| 2021 | Molly Clark | England |
| 2021 | Andrea Mirón | Spain |
| 2021 | Adriele Rocha | Brazil |
2022
| 2022 | Adriele Rocha | Brazil |
| 2022 | Andrea Mirón | Spain |
| 2022 | Bárbara Colodetti | Brazil |
2023
| 2023 | Adriele Rocha | Brazil |
| 2023 | Andrea Mirón | Spain |
| 2023 | Adriana Manau | Spain |
2024
| 2024 | Adriele Rocha | Brazil |
| 2024 | Andrea Mirón | Spain |
| 2024 | Adriana Manau | Spain |
2025
| 2025 | Andrea Mirón | Spain |
| 2025 | Bárbara Colodetti | Brazil |
| 2025 | Adriana Manau | Spain |

=== Best women's goalkeeper ===
- Decided by: Players and coaches

New award introduced in 2023.

Fellow national team captains and coaches vote for who they want to be crowned best women's goalkeeper of the year. BSWW reveal a shortlist of the three players with the most votes prior to the ceremony. On the awards night, the winner of the award with the most votes of the three is revealed as the best women's player of the year.

Shortlists of three players with most votes ( Award winner ):
| Year | Player | Team |
|---|---|---|
2023
| 2023 | Laura Gallego | Spain |
| 2023 | Ana Bê Ribeiro | Brazil |
| 2023 | Anastasiia Terekh | Ukraine |
2024
| 2024 | Laura Gallego | Spain |
| 2024 | Lelê Lopes | Brazil |
| 2024 | Anastasiia Terekh | Ukraine |
2025
| 2025 | Lelê Lopes | Brazil |
| 2025 | Jamila Marreiros | Portugal |
| 2025 | Anastasiia Terekh | Ukraine |

=== Best women's five ===
- Decided by: Players and coaches

New award introduced in 2025.

Fellow national team captains and coaches vote for the five players that they believe, combined, form the best team of the year, similar to the FIFA World XI award in association football. On the awards night, the five winners of the award with the most votes are revealed as the Best Five.

2025–
| Year | Players | Team | Position |
|---|---|---|---|
2025
| 2025 | Lelê Lopes | Brazil | Goalkeeper |
| 2025 | Andrea Mirón | Spain | Defender |
| 2025 | Bárbara Colodetti | Brazil | Defender |
| 2025 | Adriana Manau | Spain | Forward |
| 2025 | Taiane Costa | Brazil | Forward |

=== Best referee ===
- Decided by: BSWW panel of experts

New award introduced in 2023.

Experts at BSWW decide which player will be crowned the best refereeing figure of the year. On the awards night, the winner of the award is revealed. No preliminary shortlist is disclosed.

| Year | Winner | Association | Refereeing role |
|---|---|---|---|
2023
| 2023 | Michele Conti | (Italy) Italian Football Federation | Instructor |
2024
| 2024 | Sérgio Soares | (Portugal) Portuguese Football Federation | Referee |
2025
| 2025 | Łukasz Ostrowski | (Poland) Polish Football Association | Referee |

=== Best legend ===
- Decided by: BSWW panel of experts

New award introduced in 2019.

Experts at BSWW decide which figure will be awarded the legend award for that year. On the awards night, the winner of the award is revealed. No preliminary shortlist is disclosed.

| Year | Winner & age | Nation | Known as | Select achievements | Reason for award |
|---|---|---|---|---|---|
2019
| 2019 | Júnior (aged 65) | Brazil | Former player & coach | 6x world cup winner; 8x Individual award winner | Contribution to the development of beach soccer. |
2021
| 2021 | not awarded | | | | |
2022
| 2022 | Madjer (aged 45) | Portugal | Former player | 3x world cup winner; 11x Individual award winner | Considered the best player of all-time. |
2023
| 2023 | Saeed Hareb (aged 68) | United Arab Emirates | General Secretary, Dubai Sports Council | —N/a | Contribution to the development of beach soccer in Dubai, particularly the Intercontinental Cup. |
2024
| 2024 | Bruno Torres (aged 45) | Portugal | Former player | 2x world cup winner | Lifelong impact on the sport. |
2025
| 2025 | Dejan Stankovic (aged 40) | Switzerland | Former player | 1x world cup runner-up; 3x Individual award winner | Outstanding contribution to the sport. |

== See also ==
- The Best FIFA Football Awards
