= Noël Ott =

Swiss beach soccer player (born 1994)

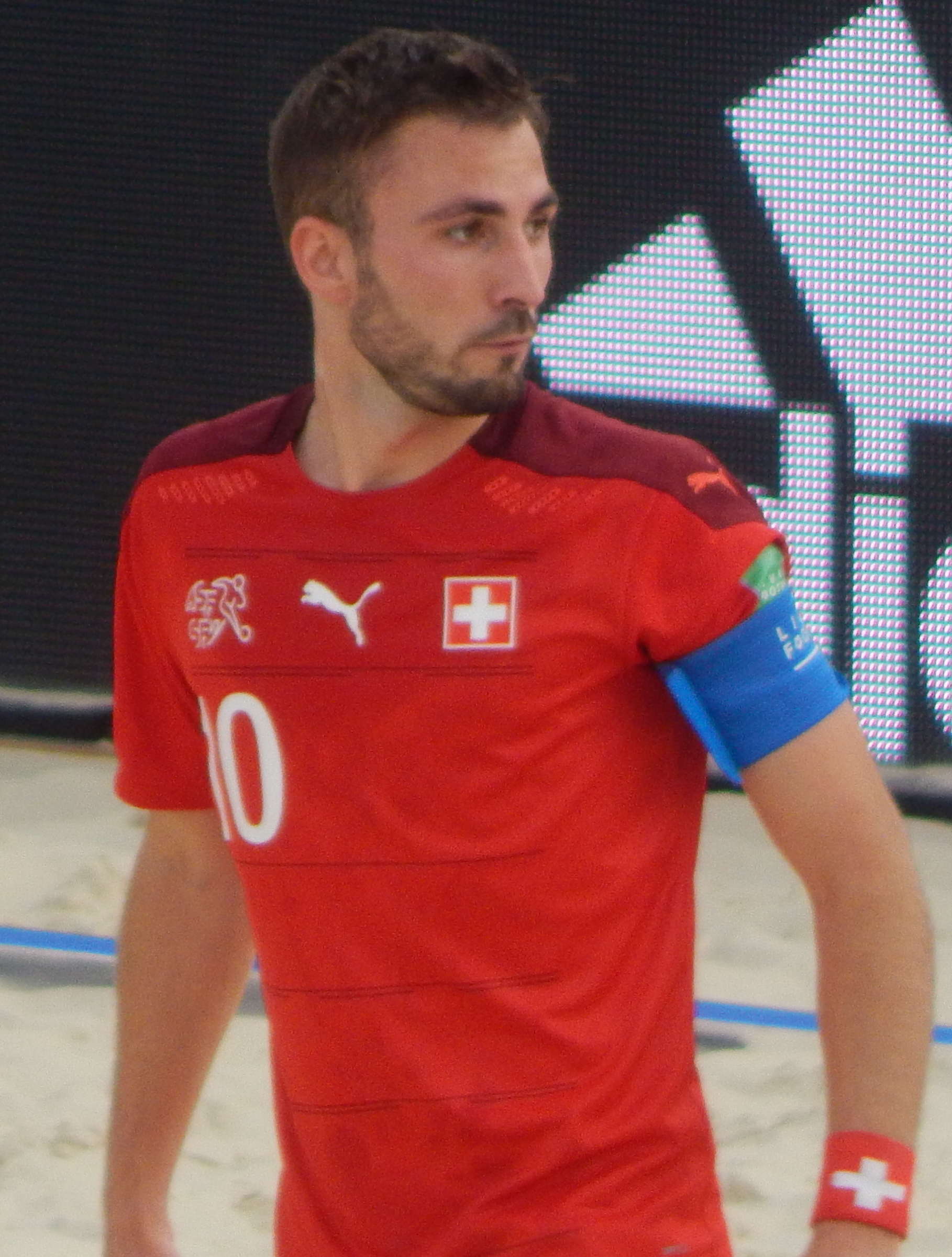
- Ott at the 2021 World Cup.

Personal information
- Full name: Noël Robin Ott
- Date of birth: 15 January 1994 (age 32)
- Place of birth: Sattel, Switzerland
- Height: 1.74 m (5 ft 9 in)
- Position: Forward

International career^{‡}
Years	Team	Apps	(Gls)
2012–	Switzerland	205	
- ‡ National team caps and goals as of 23 September 2023

Noël Robin Ott (born 15 January 1994) is a Swiss beach soccer player who plays as a forward for the Switzerland national team.

Known for his pace across the sand and technical abilities in scoring many goals, Ott came to prominence in the sport in 2014, excelling during the European season; he was named best young player in the world that year. Ott has since become described as an "indispensable" part of the Swiss national team and one of the "5 to 10 best players in the world", something which has been officially recognised multiple times in his career as the recipient of many top accolades, including the Bronze Shoe and Golden Ball at the FIFA Beach Soccer World Cup.

He is regularly referred to as the "Lionel Messi of beach soccer".

== Biography ==
=== Early life ===
Ott was born in Sattel, Switzerland and raised in Wettingen of Aargau canton. Ott's father, a former amateur of the Swiss third division, inspired him to play association football as a child at six years old. Ott joined Swiss Super League side Grasshoppers as a youth in 2007 and advanced through their junior teams from the under-13s onwards. Meanwhile, aged 9, Ott had begun attending Swiss Beach Soccer youth camps. He was originally tutored by Stephan Meier and Moritz Jaggy, members of the Swiss national team Ott would ultimately play alongside of. He continued to be present at the training camps over the next decade. As a youth, it was clear to Swiss coach Angelo Schirinzi that Ott was a talented beach soccer player.

=== Career ===
Ott's prospects of becoming a professional footballer were dashed as he was rejected from progressing to Grasshoppers' upper youth teams. Following this rejection, Franziska Steinemann, future coach of the Switzerland women's team and a friend of Ott's mother, invited him to play with club side Havana Shots Aargau of the Suzuki Swiss National Beach Soccer League. Ott debuted in the National League in 2009, aged 15. Initially, Ott attempted to continue his football career, joining FC Baden of the Swiss fourth tier for a year whilst also playing for Havana Shots; he made rapid progress with the latter. In his second season with Aargau in 2011, Ott was named "rookie of the year" and in the 2012 season, he was named best player and was the league's top scorer.

Following his performances in the National League, Ott was called up to the Swiss national team and, aged 18, made his debut against Brazil in the 2012 Intercontinental Cup in November. At this point it was firmly in Ott's mind that beach soccer was his priority. Beach Soccer Worldwide (BSWW) described 2014 as Ott's breakout season, confirming him as a "star". But, after winning the MVP award at the 2014 Euro Beach Soccer League Superfinal in August, Ott suffered a serious injury at the 2015 World Cup qualifiers a month later, tearing two knee ligaments, his anterior cruciate (ACL) and medial collateral (MCL), as well as tearing his meniscus. This sidelined Ott for several months. Despite this, Ott was nominated as one of the best three players in the world at the inaugural Beach Soccer Stars awards in November and was also bestowed with the "rising star award" for best young player, aged 20.

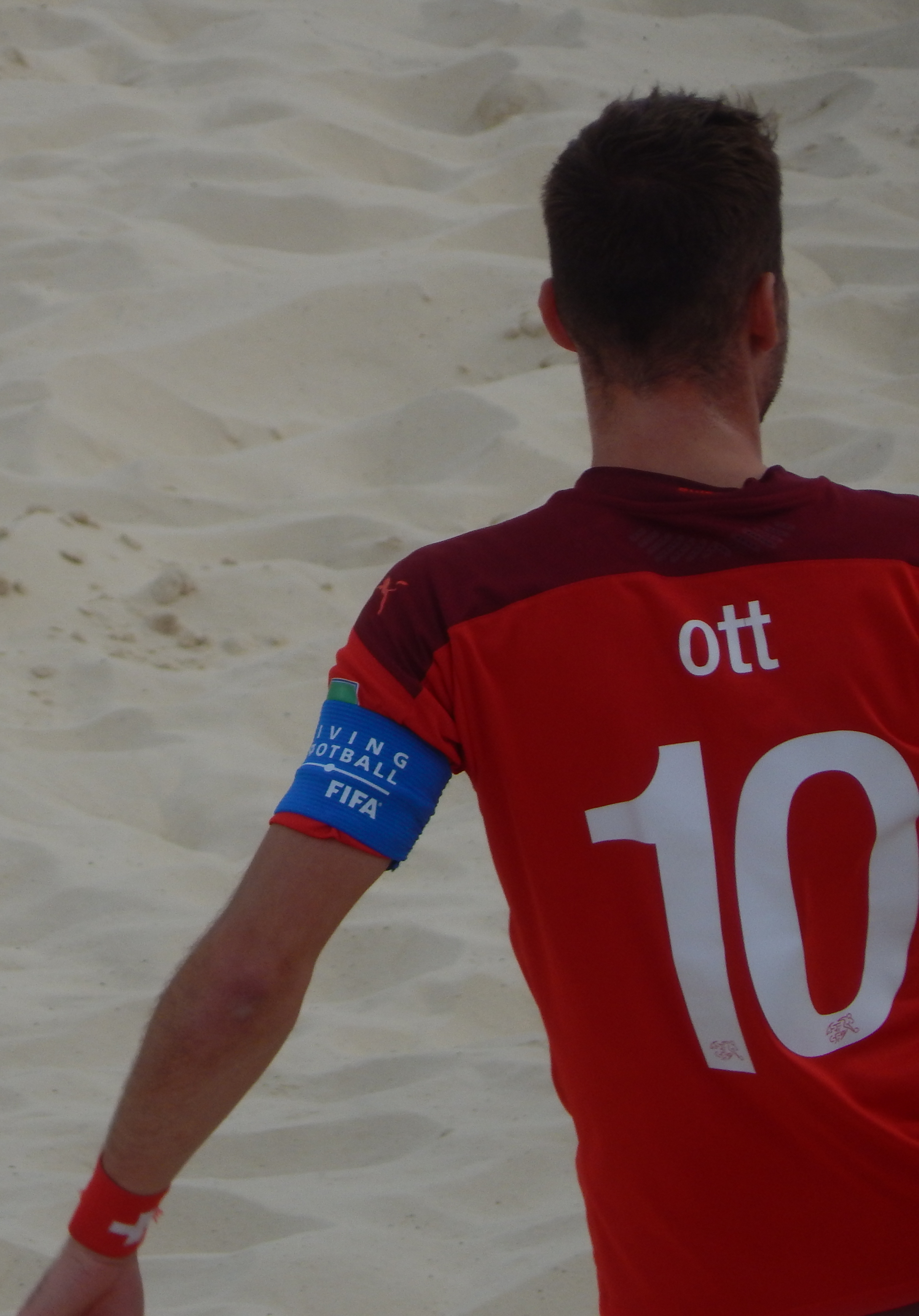
Ott wears the number 10 jersey for Switzerland.

He recovered in time for the 2015 World Cup, his first World Cup, in which he was joint top scorer with eight goals, claiming the Bronze Shoe award. In 2015, he also moved from Havana Shots back to his childhood club of Grasshoppers, this time their beach soccer branch, having been persuaded by Swiss colleague Dejan Stankovic. Ott represented FC Barcelona in 2015; Ott began to find that he was frequently being compared to football star Lionel Messi, with both having played for Barcelona, being small in stature, technically agile, frequent goalscorers and wearers of the number 10 jersey. He has since gone on to play for other clubs outside of Switzerland including Catania (Italy), Pisa (Italy), Lokomotiv Moscow (Russia), CSKA Moscow (Russia), Botofogo (Brazil), Sporting CP (Portugal), Artur Music (Ukraine) and Kfar Qassem (Israel). At the 2017 Beach Soccer Stars awards, Ott was named as part of the world team of the year.

In 2019, he won the Swiss National League for the first time with Grasshoppers and earned his first commendation with the Swiss national team, the bronze medal at the 2019 European Games.

Ott scoring a penalty against Senegal at the 2021 World Cup.

Ott tore his meniscus for a second time in September 2020, this time playing football for SC Zofingen. This time the injury required surgery which took place a month later. This ruled out Ott from playing until at least spring 2021. Upon his return, Ott began a spell of sustained success and wider recognition. He first won the bronze medal at the 2021 FIFA Beach Soccer World Cup in which he was also awarded the Golden Ball (best player). His performances led him to be nominated for the MVP award at the 2021 Swiss Sports Personality of the Year ceremony – he finished in fifth place with 6.3% of the vote. He then became European champion with Switzerland for the first time when they won the 2022 Euro Beach Soccer League; for the second time in his career, Ott was also named as one of the world's best three players at that year's Beach Soccer Stars ceremony and part of the world dream team, and was also named as the Aargau Athlete of the Year. In 2023, he became European club champion for the first time, winning the 2023 Euro Winners Cup with Kfar Qassem and a second title with Switzerland – the gold medal at the 2023 European Games. Ott marked his 200th cap for his country in a 7–1 friendly win over Denmark on 1 August 2023.

== Style of play ==
Ott has described himself as a "whirlwind" who "spins past opponents" and likes to "go one-on-one with opposition players". His pace is also frequently referenced as his strength, with an ability to glide quickly across the pitch without his feet sinking into the soft sand surface; teammate Dejan Stankovic has similarly talked of Ott's "lightness on the ball", that allows him to "dance around opponents". Stankovic has also highlighted Ott's awareness, decision-making and composure in both shooting and playmaking. Ott is also known for his exceptional technical abilities.

== Personal life ==
In 2013, Ott gained a bachelor's degree in economics. In 2015, he was working as an office administrator in Zürich and would subsequently drive to Basel to train with the national team. His employer of the time in 2017 fired Ott as they were unwilling to accommodate his need to dedicate so much time to beach soccer. He attempted to make a full time living from the sport in 2017 but found life in Switzerland too expensive to survive on payments available to beach soccer players. By 2022, he had completed training as a human resources specialist.

Cristiano Ronaldo is his idol. Within beach soccer, he looks up to Portuguese brothers Leo and Bê Martins but says the most important people in his career have been Swiss coach Angelo Schirinzi and teammate Dejan Stankovic.

== Statistics ==
Note: Some of the sources of these statistics may have counted an appearance when the player was actually an unused substitute.

Competition	Season	Apps	Goals	Ref.
Euro Beach Soccer League
Euro Beach Soccer League	2013	3	2	
Euro Beach Soccer League	2014	9	21	
Euro Beach Soccer League	2015	7	8	
Euro Beach Soccer League	2016	8	10	
Euro Beach Soccer League	2017	9	16	
Euro Beach Soccer League	2018	9	18	
Euro Beach Soccer League	2019	7	5	
Euro Beach Soccer League	2020	4	4	
Euro Beach Soccer League	2021	3	0	
Euro Beach Soccer League	2022	6	5	
Euro Beach Soccer League	2023	6	15	
Total		71	104	—

Competition	Year	Apps	Goals	Ref.
FIFA Beach Soccer World Cup	(Portugal) 2015	4	8	
FIFA Beach Soccer World Cup	(The Bahamas) 2017	4	5	
FIFA Beach Soccer World Cup	(Paraguay) 2019	4	7	
FIFA Beach Soccer World Cup	(Russia) 2021	6	5	
Total		18	25	—

== Honours ==
The following is a selection, not an exhaustive list, of the major international honours Ott has achieved:

=== Team ===
National

- FIFA Beach Soccer World Cup
  - Third place (bronze) (1): 2021
- Euro Beach Soccer League
  - Winner (gold) (1): 2022
  - Runner-up (silver) (1): 2020
  - Third place (bronze) (1): 2013
- European Games
  - Gold medal (gold) (1): 2023
  - Bronze medal (bronze) (1): 2019
- UEFA qualifiers for the FIFA Beach Soccer World Cup
  - Runner-up (silver) (2): 2014, 2016
- Euro Beach Soccer Cup
  - Runner-up (silver) (1): 2014

Club

- Euro Winners Cup
  - Winner (gold) (1): 2023
  - Runner-up (silver) (1): 2016
  - Third place (bronze) (1): 2022

=== Individual ===
- FIFA Beach Soccer World Cup (2):
  - Golden Ball: 2021
  - Bronze Shoe: 2015
- Beach Soccer Stars (5):
  - Rising star: 2014
  - World's top 3 best players: 2014, 2022
  - World dream team: 2017, 2022
- Euro Beach Soccer League (10):
  - Superfinal:
    - Best player: 2014, 2022
    - Top scorer: 2017, 2023
  - Regular season stages:
    - Best player: 2014 x1, 2015 x1
    - Top scorer: 2014 x1, 2016 x1, 2018 x2
- UEFA qualifiers for the FIFA Beach Soccer World Cup (1):
  - Top scorer: 2021
- Euro Beach Soccer Cup (1):
  - Top scorer: 2014

=== Other ===
- Swiss Sports Personality of the Year (1):
  - MVP award nominee: 2021
- Aargau Athlete of the Year (2):
  - Winner: 2022
  - Nominee: 2021
