= 2020 Euro Beach Soccer League =

- Logo of the Superfinal.

Tournament details
- Host country: Portugal
- Dates: 2–6 September
- Teams: 5 (from 1 confederation)
- Venue: 1 (in 1 host city)

Final positions
- Champions: Portugal (7th title)
- Runners-up: Switzerland
- Third place: Ukraine
- Fourth place: France

Tournament statistics
- Matches played: 10
- Goals scored: 83 (8.3 per match)

The 2020 Euro Beach Soccer League (EBSL) was the 23rd edition of the Euro Beach Soccer League, the annual, premier competition in European beach soccer contested between men's national teams. It is organised by Beach Soccer Worldwide (BSWW).

The season was greatly affected by the COVID-19 pandemic, resulting a campaign completely unrecognisable to that of recent seasons. Originally due to start in June, the start of the season was postponed until September which ultimately saw the entire regular season cancelled. Therefore, all competing teams were entered straight into their respective divisions' post-season events: nations of Division A into the Superfinal, to compete to become the winners of this year's EBSL, and countries of Division B into the Promotion Final, to try to earn a spot in Division A next year. However, due to travel restrictions caused by the pandemic, many nations chose not to participate, and ultimately no competition concerning Division B took place at all.

Portugal were the defending champions and successfully retained their title, earning their seventh European crown.

== Effects of the COVID-19 Pandemic ==
=== Initial consequences ===
The preliminary 2020 EBSL season schedule was released in November 2019. It was planned that the regular season, taking place during June and July, would consist of five stages of fixtures in Moscow (Russia), Naples (Italy), Nazaré (Portugal), Budapest (Hungary) and one unnamed location.

In March 2020, with the severity of the COVID-19 pandemic increasing rapidly across Europe, Beach Soccer Worldwide (BSWW) announced the suspension of all beach soccer competitions under their auspices until at least June to protect the health of all those involved. In May, with the situation yet to improve, BSWW extended the suspension until September – typically this is the end of the EBSL season. However, in July, with the situation in Europe easing, BSWW announced that the EBSL season would begin in August but with major format changes due to the virus's effect:

- Due to the extreme delay to the start of the season, the entire regular season was cancelled.
- Only the finals (Superfinal and Promotion Final) were to go ahead; all teams were entered straight into the post-season events (usually only the top eight teams from each division at the end of the regular season enter).
- The usual format of the post-season events was abandoned to accommodate the different number of participating teams.
- There was no relegation from Division A (in part, this was a provision for nations in Division A choosing not to participate out of health and safety concerns surrounding the ongoing pandemic – they were not penalised for making this choice).

=== Calendar and locations ===
The original calendar was revealed on 8 July 2020.

Chișinău, Moldova was to host the Promotion Final from 19 to 23 August, whilst Figueira da Foz, Portugal was to host the Superfinal from 1–6 September. Organisers, BSWW, stressed the schedule may be changed depending on the future state of the COVID-19 pandemic; changes were subsequently made:

The local organisers in Figueira da Foz decided to defer hosting until 2021 due to the requirement of having to play their event behind closed doors this year. Later, due to cross-border travel restrictions because of the pandemic, BSWW and the Moldovan Football Federation (FMF) agreed to postpone Chișinău's hosting until 2021 as well.

The Superfinal was rescheduled to take place as follows, however the Promotion Final was never rescheduled and thus no competition regarding Division B took place this season:

Phase	Dates	Country	City	Stage	Divisions	
Regular season	Cancelled due to the COVID-19 pandemic				A	B
Postseason/ Finals	2–6 September	Portugal	Nazaré	Superfinal	A	
Postseason/ Finals	Cancelled due to the COVID-19 pandemic			Promotion Final		B

== Teams ==
The numbers in parentheses show the European ranking of each team prior to the start of the season, out of 37 nations.

=== Division A ===
With COVID-19 concerns and restrictions in mind, of the 12 sides in the top tier, just five decided to participate as follows. This made it the first season of the competition not to feature Italy or Spain.

- Portugal (1st)
- ~~Italy (2nd)~~
- ~~Russia (3rd)~~
- ~~Spain (4th)~~
- Switzerland (5th)
- ~~Belarus (6th)~~
- Ukraine (7th)
- France (8th)
- ~~Poland (9th)~~
- Germany (10th)
- ~~Azerbaijan (11th)~~
- ~~Turkey (13th)~~

=== Division B ===
None – season cancelled.

== Superfinal ==
Matches are listed as local time in Nazaré, WEST (UTC+1)

All matches took place at the Estádio do Viveiro on Praia de Nazaré (Nazaré Beach). Due to COVID-19 concerns, the matches were played behind closed doors.

The Superfinal was played in a single round-robin format, involving one group of all five teams. The team with the most points after all games were completed were crowned EBSL champions.

As per the effects of the COVID-19 pandemic on the competition, no team was relegated to Division B this season.

=== Results ===
Pos	Team	Pld	W	W+	WP	L	GF	GA	GD	Pts	Result
1	Portugal (H)	4	4	0	0	0	20	7	+13	12	EBSL Champions (7th title)
2	Switzerland	4	3	0	0	1	26	15	+11	9	Runners-up
3	Ukraine	4	1	0	1	2	14	13	+1	4	Third place
4	France	4	1	0	0	3	9	28	–19	3	
5	Germany	4	0	0	0	4	14	20	–6	0	

Key: (H) Hosts

2 September 2020
16:00

Ukraine	3–3	Germany
Hoeveler 19' (o.g.); Pashko 24'; Voitok 31'	Report	20', 35' Metzler; 36' Biermann
Penalties
Voitok (penalty missed); Pashko (penalty scored); Shcherytsia (penalty scored); Khyzhniak (penalty scored); Zavorotnyi (penalty scored)	4–3	(penalty missed) Meltzer; (penalty scored) Baaske; (penalty scored) Mutulingam; (penalty scored) Nowak; (penalty missed) Weirauch

2 September 2020
17:30

France	0–7	Portugal
	Report	10', 11', 28' Leo Martins; 14' Von; 18' Rui Coimbra; 24' Lourenço; 26' Belchior

3 September 2020
16:00

Switzerland	10–2	France
Stankovic 2', 26', 35'; Mounoud 5'; Wuest 11'; Ott 12', 14', 25'; Hodel 29'; Wandji 31'	Report(ru)	10' Huck; 15' Belhomme

3 September 2020
17:30

Portugal	4–1	Germany
Bê Martins 12'; Bruno Torres 13'; Belchior 19'; Lourenço 22'	Report(ru)	10' (pen.) Mutulingam

4 September 2020
14:30

Germany	4–5	France
Mutulingam 5' (pen.); Beqiri 25', 35'; Metzler 35'	Report(ru)	15' Shillingford; 17' Gosselin; 23' Belhomme; 30' Santos; 35' Huck

4 September 2020
15:45

Ukraine	2–4	Switzerland
Zborovskyi 8', 28' (pen.)	Report(ru)	6' Hodel; 16', 17' (pen.), 35' Stankovic

5 September 2020
16:00

Switzerland	8–6	Germany
Wuest 4', 29'; Hodel 11', 21', 33'; Steinemann 14'; Ostgen 15'; Hoeveler 20' (o.g.)	Report(ru)	3', 26' (pen.) Biermann; 17', 22', 35' (pen.) Beqiri; 27' Meltzer

5 September 2020
17:30

Portugal	4–2	Ukraine
Bê Martins 11'; Bruno Torres 13'; Batalha 20'; Leo Martins 30'	Report(ru)	7' Voitenko; 27' Voitok

6 September 2020
16:00

Ukraine	7–2	France
Pashko 3', 12', 29'; Voitok 21'; Zavorotnyi 23'; Shcherytsia 28'; Voitenko 30'	Report(ru)	10', 33' Gosselin

6 September 2020
17:30

Portugal	5–4	Switzerland
Leo Martins 4', 14', 34'; Lourenço 10'; Belchior 17'	Report(ru)	9' Ott; 15', 16' Stankovic; 20' Mounoud

=== Awards ===
==== Winners trophy ====
2020 Euro Beach Soccer League
champions

Portugal
Seventh title

==== Individual awards ====
Top scorer(s)
(Switzerland) Dejan Stankovic
8 goals
Best player
(Portugal) Leo Martins
Best goalkeeper
(Portugal) Elinton Andrade

=== Top scorers ===
Players with at least 2 goals

8 goals

- (Switzerland) Dejan Stankovic

7 goals

- (Portugal) Leo Martins

5 goals

- (Switzerland) Glenn Hodel
- (Germany) Valon Beqiri

4 goals

- (Switzerland) Noël Ott
- (Germany) Josh Meltzer
- (Ukraine) Andrii Pashko

3 goals

- (Switzerland) Angelo Wuest
- (Portugal) André Lourenço
- (Portugal) Belchior
- (Ukraine) Maksym Voitok
- (France) Quentin Gosselin
- (Germany) Christian Biermann

2 goals

- (Switzerland) Eliott Mounoud
- (Portugal) Bruno Torres
- (Portugal) Bê Martins
- (Ukraine) Dmytro Voitenko
- (France) Sébastien Huck
- (France) Stephane Belhomme
- (Ukraine) Oleg Zborovskyi
- (Germany) Julin Mutulingam
