= 2002 Euro Beach Soccer League =

Tournament details
- Dates: 1 June – 7 September
- Teams: 10 (from 1 confederation)
- Venue: 11 (in 11 host cities)

Final positions
- Champions: Portugal (1st title)
- Runners-up: Spain
- Third place: France
- Fourth place: Turkey

Tournament statistics
- Matches played: 67
- Goals scored: 733 (10.94 per match)
- Top scorer: (Portugal) Alan
- Best player: (Italy) Gianni Fruzzetti
- Best goalkeeper: (Spain) Roberto Valeiro

Locations of the events of the 2002 Euro Beach Soccer League
Southern Group events
Northern Group events
Superfinal

The 2002 Euro Beach Soccer League, was the fifth edition of the Euro Beach Soccer League (EBSL), the premier beach soccer competition contested between European men's national teams, known as the European Pro Beach Soccer League at the time, occurring annually since its establishment in 1998. The league was organised by Beach Soccer Worldwide (BSWW) between June 1 and September 7, 2002 in nine different nations across Europe.

This season BSWW introduced Divisions to the EBSL for the first time; the nations of the league were split into two groups based on similar levels of ability. These groups were known as the Southern and Northern groups, named so after the roughly similar geographical locations in Europe the nations in the respective divisions could be found. The Southern group consisted of the best 4 nations of the EBSL and was considered as the top division. Whilst the Northern group consisted of the other teams of lesser ability and was considered the lower division of the two. The difference in abilities of the two divisions was reflected in there being less Superfinal qualification spots available for the Northern group.

Each team competed in their respective division/group to try and earn a place in the season-finale event, the Superfinal, in which the league title was then contested directly.

Spain entered the competition as three-time defending champions. However it was Portugal, who having finished runners-up in the league for the last two years, finally found success and claimed their maiden European title by beating the Spanish in the final.

The league also doubled as the qualification process for the 2003 Beach Soccer World Championship. The nations finishing in first, second and third place qualified.

== Teams ==
This season 10 nations took part in the Euro Beach Soccer League whom were and were distributed as follows. Despite the names of the groups following the rough geographical locations of the teams in Europe, Turkey was a notably clear exception in the "Northern" group.

=== Southern Group (Top Division, 4) ===
- France
- Italy
- Portugal
- Spain

=== Northern Group (Lower Division, 6) ===
- Austria
- England
- Germany
- Norway
- Switzerland
- Turkey

=== Superfinal berths ===
Following on from the maiden Superfinal last season, the season-ending event was expanded from four teams to six teams. The table summarises in what positions nations needed to finish in their respective divisions/groups in order to qualify to the Superfinal and what round of the Superfinal they would enter finishing in said positions.

Allocations:

The amount of qualification spots available in the Superfinal from each division reflected the abilities of the nations in the respective groups.

- The Southern Group, consisting of the best teams of the EBSL, was awarded four Superfinal berths (with only four teams in the group, all teams automatically qualified - the teams played in their group to try and finish in the top two positions in order to earn the two berths straight into the Superfinal semi-finals)
- The Northern Group, in being considered the lower division, received just two berths

#	Position in Division	Group	Round entered
1	Winner	Southern	Semi-finals
2	Runner-up	Southern	Semi-finals
3	Third place	Southern	Quarter-finals
4	Fourth place	Southern	Quarter-finals
5	Winner	Northern	Quarter-finals
6	Runner-up	Northern	Quarter-finals

== Southern Group (Top Division) ==
The Southern Group consisted of four rounds of fixtures known as stages, with one stage hosted in each of the four countries participating as shown. All four teams took part in each. In each stage, the teams played each other once. The nation who earned the most points at the end of the stage was crowned stage winners.

At the end of the four stages all results were tallied up in a final league table.

=== Stage 1 ===
The first stage took place in Marseille, France. Spain finished as victors in the opening round.

==== Matches ====
5 July 2002
France	6–7	Italy
Portugal	4–6	Spain
6 July 2002
France	3–6	Spain
Portugal	6–2	Italy
7 July 2002
Italy	2–3	Spain
France	4–8	Portugal

==== Final standings ====
Pos	Team	Pld	W	W+	L	GF	GA	GD	Pts
1	Spain	3	3	0	0	15	9	+6	9
2	Portugal	3	2	0	1	18	12	+6	6
3	Italy	3	1	0	2	11	15	–4	3
4	France	3	0	0	3	13	21	–8	0

Awards
Best player: (Spain) Nico
Top scorer(s): (Portugal) Alan, (Spain) Amarelle (6 goals each)
Best goalkeeper: (Spain) Roberto Valerio

=== Stage 2 ===
The second stage took place in Carcavelos, Portugal. The hosts claimed their first stage of the season.

==== Matches ====
12 July 2002
Portugal	3–1	Italy
France	2–3 (a.e.t.)	Spain
13 July 2002
Portugal	9–6	France
Spain	4–3	Italy
14 July 2002
Italy	1–4	France
Portugal	4–1	Spain

==== Final standings ====
Pos	Team	Pld	W	W+	L	GF	GA	GD	Pts
1	Portugal	3	3	0	0	16	8	+8	9
2	Spain	3	1	1	1	8	9	–1	5
3	France	3	1	0	2	12	13	–1	3
4	Italy	3	0	0	3	5	11	–6	0

Awards
Best player: (Portugal) Alan
Top scorer(s): (Portugal) Alan (6 goals)
Best goalkeeper: (Italy) Marco Cesarini

=== Stage 3 ===
The third stage took place in Rome, Italy. Portugal followed up their first stage win with a second crown here.

==== Matches ====
19 July 2002
Italy	3–8	Spain
Portugal	6–4	France
20 July 2002
France	5–4 (a.e.t.)	Spain
Italy	2–9	Portugal
21 July 2002
Italy	7–5	France
Portugal	3–2	Spain

==== Final standings ====
Pos	Team	Pld	W	W+	L	GF	GA	GD	Pts
1	Portugal	3	3	0	0	18	8	+10	9
2	Spain	3	1	0	2	14	11	+3	3
3	Italy	3	1	0	2	12	22	–10	3
4	France	3	0	1	2	14	17	–3	2

Awards
Best player: (Portugal) Alan
Top scorer(s): (Spain) Amarelle (10 goals)
Best goalkeeper: (Portugal) Zé Miguel

=== Stage 4 ===
The fourth stage took place in El Arenal, Mallorca, Spain. The final stage was claimed by France.

==== Matches ====
26 July 2002
France	5–5 (a.e.t.); 2–1 (pens.)	Portugal
Spain	5–3	Italy
27 July 2002
Italy	2–3	Portugal
Spain	7–8 (a.e.t.)	France
28 July 2002
Spain	4–3	Portugal
France	4–2	Italy

==== Final standings ====
Pos	Team	Pld	W	W+	L	GF	GA	GD	Pts
1	France	3	1	2	0	17	14	+3	7
2	Spain	3	2	0	1	16	14	+2	6
3	Portugal	3	1	0	2	11	11	0	3
4	Italy	3	0	0	3	7	12	–5	0

Awards
Best player: (France) Claude Barrabé
Top scorer(s): (Portugal) Alan (6 goals)
Best goalkeeper: (Spain) Roberto Valerio

=== Final table ===
All four teams automatically qualified to the Superfinal. Finishing first and second earned those teams byes straight into the semi-finals of the Superfinal, whilst the lower positioned teams in third and fourth were entered into the quarter-finals

Portugal were crowned winners of the group and earned the bye into the Superfinal semi-finals along with runners-up Spain.

Pos	Team	Pld	W	W+	L	GF	GA	GD	Pts	Qualification
1	Portugal	12	9	0	3	63	39	+24	27	Advance to Superfinal semi-finals
2	Spain	12	7	1	4	53	43	+10	23	Advance to Superfinal semi-finals
3	France	12	2	3	7	56	65	–9	12	Advance to Superfinal quarter-finals
4	Italy	12	2	0	10	35	60	–25	6	Advance to Superfinal quarter-finals

== Northern Group (Lower Division) ==
The Northern consisted of six rounds of fixtures known as stages, which commenced before the matches of the Southern Group. Of the nations competing, Austria hosted two stages, England, Switzerland and Turkey one, whilst Norway and Germany did not host any stage (despite Düsseldorf originally scheduled to host a round of fixtures). The remaining stage was held in a neutral country, France. Four of the six teams took part in each stage, with each team taking part in a total of four stages. In every round of fixtures the teams played each other once. The nation who earned the most points at the end of the stage was crowned stage winners.

At the end of the six stages all results were tallied up in a final league table.

=== Stage 1 ===
The first stage took place in Brighton, England. The Swiss won the first stage crown.

==== Matches ====
1 June 2002
England	4–3	Norway
Switzerland	5–4	Germany
2 June 2002
England	1–5	Switzerland
Germany	5–4	Norway
3 June 2002
Norway	5–9	Switzerland
England	2–3	Germany

==== Final standings ====
Pos	Team	Pld	W	W+	L	GF	GA	GD	Pts
1	Switzerland	3	3	0	0	19	10	+9	9
2	Germany	3	2	0	1	12	11	+1	6
3	England	3	1	0	2	7	11	–4	3
4	Norway	3	0	0	3	12	18	–6	0

Awards
Best player: (Norway) Jorn A. Larsen
Top scorer(s): (Switzerland) Angelo Schirinzi, (Norway) Jorn A. Larsen (5 goals)
Best goalkeeper: (Switzerland) Stefan Knutti

=== Stage 2 ===
The second stage took place in Alanya, Turkey. Switzerland won their second consecutive stage.

==== Matches ====
12 July 2002
Austria	9–1	England
Turkey	6–6 (a.e.t.); 2–1 (pens.)	Switzerland
13 July 2002
Turkey	5–2	Austria
Switzerland	11–5	England
14 July 2002
Austria	2–4	Switzerland
Turkey	4–5	England

==== Final standings ====
Pos	Team	Pld	W	W+	L	GF	GA	GD	Pts
1	Switzerland	3	2	0	1	21	13	+8	6
2	Turkey	3	1	1	1	15	13	+2	5
3	Austria	3	1	0	2	13	10	+3	3
4	England	3	1	0	2	11	24	–13	3

Awards
Best player: (Turkey) Tamer Ay
Top scorer(s): (Switzerland) Angelo Schirinzi (8 goals)
Best goalkeeper: (Austria) Klaus Lindenberger

=== Stage 3 ===
The third stage took place in Basel, Switzerland. Turkey were crowned stage champions based on their head-to-head record with Germany.

==== Matches ====
19 July 2002
Turkey	5–4 (a.e.t.)	Germany
Switzerland	9–7	Norway
20 July 2002
Turkey	4–3 (a.e.t.)	Norway
Switzerland	4–6	Germany
21 July 2002
Germany	9–5	Norway
Switzerland	4–6	Turkey

==== Final standings ====
Pos	Team	Pld	W	W+	L	GF	GA	GD	Pts
1	Turkey	3	1	2	0	15	11	+4	7
2	Germany	3	2	0	1	19	14	+5	6
3	Switzerland	3	1	0	2	17	19	–2	3
4	Norway	3	0	0	3	15	22	–7	0

Awards
Best player: (Switzerland) Reto Baumgartner
Top scorer(s): (Germany) Mano Pölking (10 goals)
Best goalkeeper: (Germany) Michael Serr

=== Stage 4 ===
The fourth stage took place in Linz, Austria. The hosts finished with their first stage win of the season.

==== Matches ====
2 August 2002
Austria	5–4	Norway
England	6–2	Germany
3 August 2002
Austria	9–8	Germany
Norway	5–6	England
4 August 2002
Germany	6–4	Norway
Austria	10–2	England

==== Final standings ====
Pos	Team	Pld	W	W+	L	GF	GA	GD	Pts
1	Austria	3	3	0	0	24	14	+10	9
2	England	3	2	0	1	14	17	–3	6
3	Germany	3	1	0	2	16	19	–3	3
4	Norway	3	0	0	3	13	17	–5	2

Awards
Best player: (Germany) Uwe Bein
Top scorer(s): (Germany) Uwe Bein (9 goals)
Best goalkeeper: (Austria) Klaus Lindenberger

=== Stage 5 ===
The fifth stage took place in Kitzbühel, Austria. Turkey won the stage based on their head-to-head record with Norway, whilst Austria finished ahead of Germany also based on head-to-head records.

==== Matches ====
16 August 2002
Austria	6–10	Norway
Turkey	7–9	Germany
17 August 2002
Austria	7–8 (a.e.t.)	Turkey
Norway	7–7 (a.e.t.); 2–1 (pens.)	Germany
18 August 2002
Austria	11–8	Germany
Turkey	7–5	Norway

==== Final standings ====
Pos	Team	Pld	W	W+	L	GF	GA	GD	Pts
1	Turkey	3	1	1	1	22	21	+1	5
2	Norway	3	1	1	1	22	20	+2	5
3	Austria	3	1	0	2	24	26	–2	3
4	Germany	3	1	0	2	24	25	–1	3

Awards
Best player: (Germany) Uwe Bein
Top scorer(s): (Germany) Mano Pölking, (Austria) Jürgen Werner (9 goals)
Best goalkeeper: (Norway) Marius Haugland

=== Stage 6 ===
The sixth and final stage took place in Palavas-les-Flots, France. Austria claimed the final stage of the Northern Group.

==== Matches ====
30 August 2002
Austria	7–4	Turkey
Switzerland	7–6	England
31 August 2002
England	2–10	Turkey
Austria	7–4	Switzerland
1 September 2002
England	7–12	Austria
Turkey	12–10	Switzerland

==== Final standings ====
Pos	Team	Pld	W	W+	L	GF	GA	GD	Pts
1	Austria	3	3	0	0	26	15	+11	9
2	Turkey	3	2	0	1	26	19	+7	6
3	Switzerland	3	1	0	2	21	25	–4	3
4	England	3	0	0	3	15	29	–14	0

Awards
Best player: (Turkey) Tamer Ay
Top scorer(s): (Switzerland) Angelo Schirinzi (16 goals)
Best goalkeeper: (Austria) Klaus Lindenberger

=== Final table ===
The top two teams qualified to the Superfinal, entering at the quarter-final stage. The remaining nations exited this season's EBSL.

Austria were narrowly crowned winners, with runners-up Turkey ousting Switzerland by a similarly slim margin to also successfully qualify for the season-ending event.

Pos	Team	Pld	W	W+	L	GF	GA	GD	Pts	Qualification
1	Austria	12	8	0	4	87	65	+22	24	Advance to Superfinal quarter-finals
2	Turkey	12	5	4	3	78	64	+14	23	Advance to Superfinal quarter-finals
3	Switzerland	12	7	0	5	78	67	+11	21	
4	Germany	12	6	0	6	71	69	+2	18	
5	England	12	4	0	8	47	81	–34	12	
6	Norway	12	1	1	10	62	77	–15	5	

== Superfinal ==
=== Qualified teams ===
This is a summary of the teams who qualified for the Superfinal.

#	Team	Group	Round entered
1	Portugal	Southern	Semi-finals
2	Spain	Southern	Semi-finals
3	France	Southern	Quarter-finals
4	Italy	Southern	Quarter-finals
5	Austria	Northern	Quarter-finals
6	Turkey	Northern	Quarter-finals

=== Results ===
- Dates: 5–7 September 2002
- Location: Monte Carlo, Monaco

This season the Superfinal was played as a straight knockout tournament. Four of the six teams contesting the title started in the quarter-finals, whilst the top two nations from the Southern Group received a bye and started in the semi-finals. The teams played one match per round until the final when the winner of the 2002 Euro Beach Soccer League was crowned. The losers of the quarter and semi-finals played in consolation matches to determine their final league placements.

In the quarter-finals the Southern and Northern group qualifiers were kept apart; one tie involved the two qualifiers from the Northern Group playing against each other, whilst the other tie had the two qualifiers from the Southern Group playing one another. Finishing in the top two of the top tier, Portugal had a bye straight into the semis. However, as winners of the Southern Group, Portugal were also rewarded with getting to play the weaker of the two quarter-final winners, the winner of the all-Northern tie, in the semi-finals. Whilst Spain, as runners-up of the Southern Group, did not earn this luxury and had to play the harder-on-paper winner of the all-Southern quarter-final.

Quarter-finals (5th Sep.)
Austria	6
Turkey	14
France	12
Italy	7

Semi-finals (6th Sep.)
Portugal	8
Turkey	5
Spain (pens.)	7 (1)
France	7 (0)
5th place match (6th Sep.)
Austria	7
Italy	6

Final (7th Sep.)
Portugal	8
Spain	6
3rd place match (7th Sep.)
Turkey	3
France	9

=== Championship match details ===
7 September 2002

Portugal	8–6	Spain
Hernâni 5', 6'; Alan 15', 20', 27', 36'; Madjer 16', 25'	Report	5', 15', 31' Amarelle; 20' David; 24', 35' Eloy

Monte Carlo, Monaco
Referee: Patrick Fautrad (France)

==== Winners ====
2002 Euro Beach Soccer League
champions

Portugal
First title

Awards
Best player: (Spain) Amarelle
Top scorer(s): (Turkey) Tamer Ay, (France) Frank Bonora (9 goals)
Best goalkeeper: (France) Pascal Olmeta

=== Superfinal final standings ===
Portugal beat Spain in the final to win their first Euro Beach Soccer League title at their fifth attempt, and end Spain's run of three successive EPBSL titles.

Finishing in the top three positions also earned those nations qualification straight into the upcoming World Cup.

Pos	Team	Notes	Qualification
1	Portugal	EBSL Champions	Qualified to 2003 Beach Soccer World Championship
2	Spain	Runners-up	Qualified to 2003 Beach Soccer World Championship
3	France	Third place	Qualified to 2003 Beach Soccer World Championship
4	Turkey		
5	Austria		
6	Italy		

== Sources ==
- Roonba
- BSWW archive
- RSSSF
