= Elinton Andrade =

Brazilian-born Portuguese footballer (born 1979)

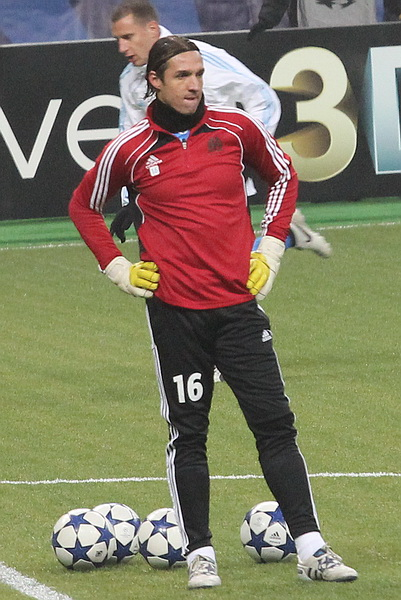
- Andrade with Marseille in 2010

Personal information
- Full name: Elinton Sanchotene Andrade
- Date of birth: 30 March 1979 (age 47)
- Place of birth: Santa Maria, Brazil
- Height: 1.90 m (6 ft 3 in)
- Position: Goalkeeper

Team information
- Current team: Flamengo Beach Soccer
- Number: 12

Youth career
- 1998–1999: CFZ

Senior career*
Years	Team	Apps	(Gls)
1999–2002	CFZ	99	(0)
2003	Flamengo	6	(0)
2004	Fluminense	3	(0)
2005	Vasco da Gama	35	(0)
2005–2006	Ascoli	0	(0)
2006	Moto Club	1	(0)
2006	Duque de Caxias	22	(0)
2007–2009	Rapid București	36	(0)
2009–2012	Marseille	3	(0)
2013	Náutico	0	(0)
2013	Ermis Aradippou	1	(0)
2014	Duque de Caxias	20	(0)
2015	FC Goa	5	(0)
2017	Fluminense Beach Soccer	9	(0)
2017	BSC Kristall Beach Soccer	7	(0)
2018	Botafogo Beach Soccer	16	(0)
2019–	Flamengo Beach Soccer	5	(0)

International career
2015–	Portugal (beach)	145	(12)
- * Club domestic league appearances and goals as of 28 May 2016

Elinton Sanchotene Andrade (born 30 March 1979) is a Brazilian-born Portuguese goalkeeper who plays for Flamengo Beach Soccer and the Portuguese beach soccer national team.

== Personal ==
Elinton has a son named Bernardo. He also holds Portuguese citizenship.

== Honours ==
=== Club ===
Rapid București

- Supercupa României (1): 2007

Marseille

- Coupe de la Ligue (2): 2009–10, 2010–11
- Ligue 1 (1): 2009–10
- Trophée des Champions: 2010

=== Country ===
- FIFA Beach Soccer World Cup (2): 2015, 2019
- Euro Beach Soccer League (3): 2015, 2019, 2020
- Euro Beach Soccer Cup (1): 2016

=== Individual ===
- Euro Beach Soccer League Best Goalkeeper (1): 2015
- Euro Beach Soccer Cup Best Goalkeeper (1): 2016
- Euro Beach Soccer Cup MVP (1): 2016
- Beach Soccer Stars Best Goalkeeper (2): 2016, 2018
- FIFA Beach Soccer World Cup Golden Glove (1): 2019
