= Léo Martins =

Portuguese beach soccer player (born 1989)

Léo Martins OIH ComM
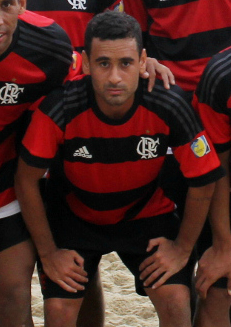
- Léo Martins playing for Flamengo in 2016.

Personal information
- Full name: Léonardo Barral Martins Santos
- Date of birth: 29 December 1989 (age 36)
- Place of birth: Rio de Janeiro, Brazil
- Height: 1.70 m (5 ft 7 in)
- Position: Forward

International career^{‡}
Years	Team	Apps	(Gls)
2015–	Portugal	171	(224)
- ‡ National team caps and goals as of 24 September 2023

Léonardo Barral Martins Santos OIH ComM (born 29 December 1989), better known simply as Léo Martins, is a Brazilian-born Portuguese beach soccer player who plays as a forward. He is a two-time winner of the FIFA Beach Soccer World Cup (2015 and 2019).

He has an identical twin brother, Bernardo, who is also a high-profile beach soccer player.

== Biography ==
Léo and his twin brother, Bê Martins, were born in Brazil. Léo was born two minutes after his older sibling. Aged 18, they went to play association football in Spain on the promise of a contract. However, when they arrived, an issue with their agent meant there was no club to sign for. The move was funded by their parents, but without an income the money soon ran out and the brothers found themselves broke and starving. Despite this, they stayed in Spain to attempt to recuperate the money for their parents. Eventually, they landed a contract with CD Canillas. During this time, they began the application process for Portuguese citizenship. This was possible since their paternal great-grandfather was from the country. In 2009, citizenship was achieved. Aged 21, in 2011, their contracts ended and their mother developed a health issue, and so they returned to Brazil. To maintain their fitness, they began training on the beach. Struggling to find a new football club, they started to pursue beach soccer instead, joining Vasco da Gama and soon after, Flamengo. Léo's progress was slightly behind his brother's, who moved on to a Russian club before him.

After finishing as top scorer at the 2014 Euro Winners Cup, Léo, and brother Bê, received an offer to join the Portugal squad at the end of 2014 after playing for clubs in Italy. Despite offers from the Brazil national team, the brothers decided they wanted to represent Portugal instead, citing their belief that there would be less chance of a "follow-up" if they were to join Brazil, their admiration for the country, and for Portuguese legends Madjer and Alan. Léo debuted for Portugal on 9 July 2015 at the 2015 FIFA Beach Soccer World Cup, six months after his brother. Léo scored his first goal for Portugal in his second appearance, against Senegal on 11 July. Portugal won the tournament, and in response, Léo, along with the rest of the squad, were appointed as Officers of the Order of Prince Henry in December 2015. That year, both brothers also joined Braga with whom they would go on to win multiple domestic and European club titles.

In 2016, Léo combined with Alan to finish off a one-two move versus Greece nominated for goal of the year, but his effort was beaten by Nick Perera of the United States.

In 2019, following Portugal's 2019 World Cup victory, along with the rest of the squad, Léo was made a Commander of the Order of Merit. He was also named as one of the tournament's top ten best players, out of the 192 participants. He ended the season as the second highest scorer in Beach Soccer Worldwide competitions with 69 goals. In 2021, Léo was voted by fellow national team captains and coaches as one of the best three players in the world at the Beach Soccer Stars awards in Dubai.

== Statistics ==
Note: Some of the sources of these statistics may have counted an appearance when the player was actually an unused substitute.

Country

Competition	Year	Apps	Goals	Ref.
FIFA Beach Soccer World Cup	(Portugal) 2015	6	1	
FIFA Beach Soccer World Cup	(The Bahamas) 2017	4	2	
FIFA Beach Soccer World Cup	(Paraguay) 2019	6	8	
FIFA Beach Soccer World Cup	(Russia) 2021	3	8	
Total		19	19	—

Competition	Season	Apps	Goals	Ref.
Euro Beach Soccer League	2015	2	1	
Euro Beach Soccer League	2016	4	4	
Euro Beach Soccer League	2017	10	14	
Euro Beach Soccer League	2018	10	8	
Euro Beach Soccer League	2019	7	5	
Euro Beach Soccer League	2020	4	7	
Euro Beach Soccer League	2021	7	14	
Euro Beach Soccer League	2022	6	13	
Euro Beach Soccer League	2023	6	4	
Total		56	70	—

Club

Tournament	Year	Club	Apps	Goals	Ref.
Euro Winners Cup
Euro Winners Cup	(Italy) 2014	(Italy) Milano	7	13	
Euro Winners Cup	(Italy) 2015	(Italy) Milano	4	0	
Euro Winners Cup	(Portugal) 2016	(Portugal) Braga	7	10	
Euro Winners Cup	(Portugal) 2017	(Portugal) Braga	7	5	
Euro Winners Cup	(Portugal) 2018	(Portugal) Braga	7	12	
Euro Winners Cup	(Portugal) 2019	(Portugal) Braga	8	7	
Euro Winners Cup	(Portugal) 2020	(Portugal) Braga	7	7	
Euro Winners Cup	(Portugal) 2021	(Portugal) Braga	8	8	
Euro Winners Cup	(Portugal) 2022	(Portugal) Braga	7	10	
Euro Winners Cup	(Portugal) 2023	(Portugal) Braga	9	12	
Total			71	84	—

== Honours ==
The following is a selection, not an exhaustive list, of the major international honours that Léo has achieved:

=== Country ===
- FIFA Beach Soccer World Cup
  - Winner (2): 2015, 2019
- Euro Beach Soccer League
  - Winner (4): 2015, 2019, 2020, 2021
- European Games
  - Gold medal (1): 2019
- Intercontinental Cup
  - Runner-up (1): 2017
- Mediterranean Beach Games
  - Silver medal (2): 2019, 2023

=== Club ===
- Euro Winners Cup
  - Winner (3): 2017, 2018, 2019
  - Runner-up (4): 2014, 2020, 2021, 2022
- Mundialito de Clubes
  - Winner (2): 2019, 2020
  - Runner-up (2): 2013, 2021

=== Individual ===
- Beach Soccer Stars (1):
  - World's top 3 best players: 2021
- Euro Beach Soccer League (5):
  - Superfinal:
    - Best player: 2020, 2021
  - Regular season stages:
    - Best player: 2018 (x1), 2022 (x1)
    - Top scorer: 2022 (x1)
- Euro Winners Cup (1):
  - Top scorer: 2014

=== Orders ===
- Officer (OIH) of the Order of Prince Henry (since 2015)
- Commander (ComM) of the Order of Merit (since 2019)
