= Dona (beach soccer) =

Spanish beach soccer player

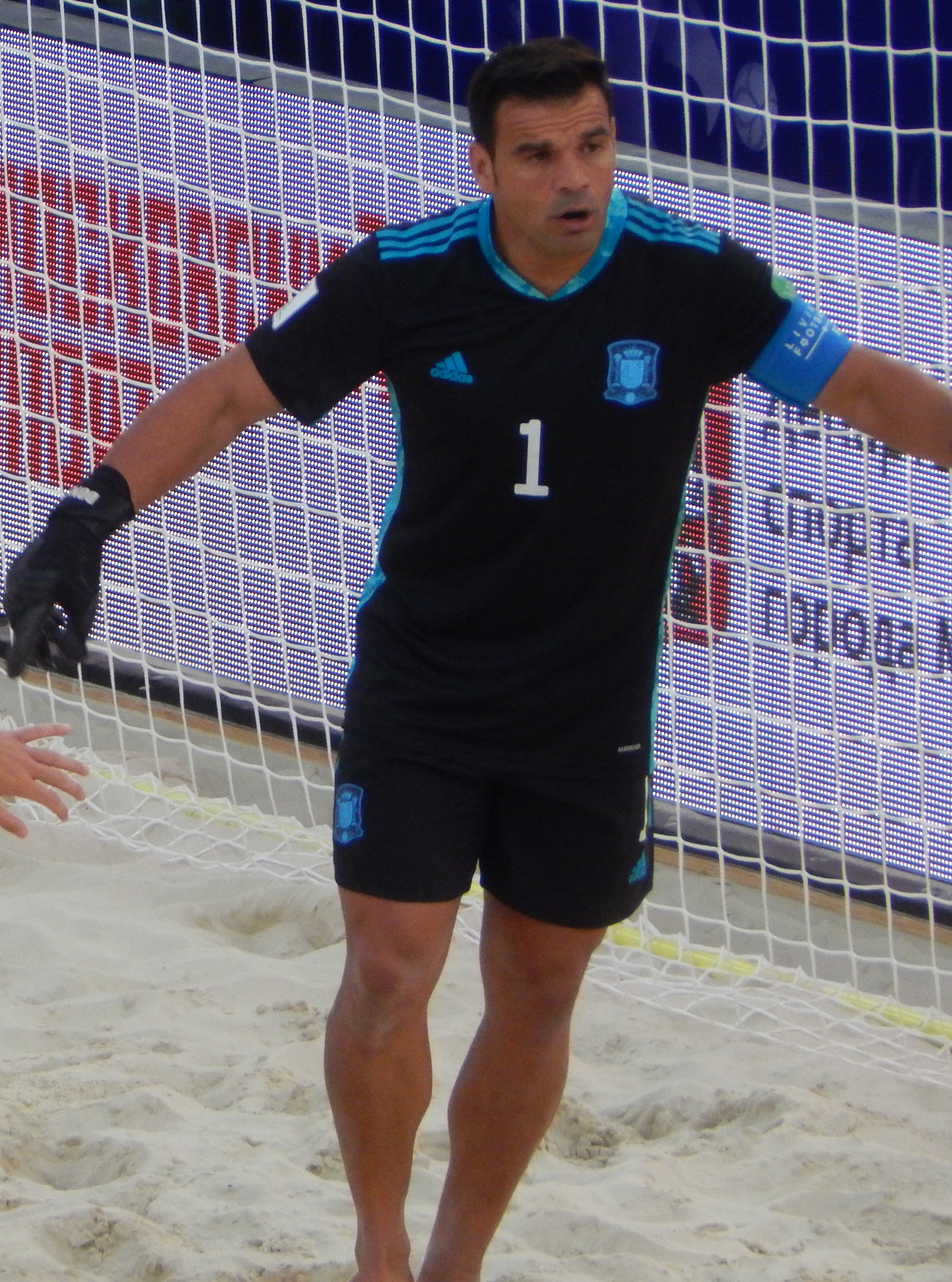
- Dona at the 2021 World Cup.

Personal information
- Full name: Francisco Jesús Donaire López
- Date of birth: 16 August 1982 (age 44)
- Place of birth: Granada, Spain
- Height: 1.80 m (5 ft 11 in)
- Position: Goalkeeper

International career^{‡}
Years	Team	Apps	(Gls)
2006–	Spain	330	
- ‡ National team caps and goals as of 9 August 2022

Francisco Jesús Donaire López (born 16 August 1982), known simply as Dona, is a Spanish beach soccer player who plays as a goalkeeper for the Spain national team. He has appeared at seven editions of the FIFA Beach Soccer World Cup, winning the Golden Glove award in 2013.

== Career ==
Dona was born in Granada but calls Almeria his hometown.

He began playing beach soccer in 2000. He was trialled for the Spain national team in 2004 but was not picked at the time. Eventually, Dona made his debut for Spain at the Copa Latina in December 2006, during an era when Roberto Valeiro was Spain's primary goalkeeper. He was then chosen for the 2007 FIFA Beach Soccer World Cup; Roberto was unable to make the tournament, and Dona appeared in three of Spain's four matches at the event. Roberto stopped playing for Spain in 2010; Spain next appeared at the World Cup in 2013 in which Dona was crucial in Spain's run to the final, winning the Golden Glove (best goalkeeper) award for his efforts and cementing himself as Spain's main goalkeeper in the process. In 2014, he was voted by fellow international players and coaches as the world's best goalkeeper at the inaugural Beach Soccer Stars awards ceremony, ending the season on the verge of 200 caps for Spain. By 2016, he had become the permanent captain of Spain.

He reached 300 caps for Spain in a 5–4 extra time victory versus Italy at the 2021 World Cup qualifiers on 25 June 2021, and was again nominated for best goalkeeper in the world at the 2022 Beach Soccer Stars awards, this time finishing in the top three. Aged 40, Dona continued to prove his worth to the national team by saving three penalties in the shootout of the third place match versus Portugal at the 2023 European Games to secure the bronze medal, and in continuing to win best goalkeeper awards during the season. By being included in Spain's squad for the 2024 World Cup, Dona set a new joint record for longest time between first and most recent appearance at the World Cup (17 years, with Moslem Mesigar of Iran), overtaking the previous record holder, Belchior of Portugal (16 years).

== Statistics ==
Competition	Year	Apps	Goals	Ref.
FIFA Beach Soccer World Cup
FIFA Beach Soccer World Cup	(Brazil) 2007	3	0	
FIFA Beach Soccer World Cup	(France) 2008	1	0	
FIFA Beach Soccer World Cup	(United Arab Emirates) 2009	2	0	
FIFA Beach Soccer World Cup	(French Polynesia) 2013	6	0	
FIFA Beach Soccer World Cup	(Portugal) 2015	3	0	
FIFA Beach Soccer World Cup	(Russia) 2021	3	0	
FIFA Beach Soccer World Cup	(United Arab Emirates) 2024	3	1	
Total		21	1	—

== Honours ==
As of 2023.

The following is a selection, not an exhaustive list, of the major honours Dona has achieved:

=== Team ===
- FIFA Beach Soccer World Cup
  - Runner-up (1): 2013
  - Fourth place (1): 2008
- Euro Beach Soccer League
  - Runner-up (3): 2014, 2018, 2023
- UEFA qualifiers for the FIFA Beach Soccer World Cup
  - Winner (4): 2008, 2009, 2012, 2021
- European Games
  - Silver medal (1): 2019
  - Bronze medal (1): 2023
- Mediterranean Beach Games
  - Gold medal (1): 2023
- Euro Beach Soccer Cup
  - Winner (3): 2008, 2009, 2014
- Mundialito
  - Winner (2): 2013, 2022
- UEFA qualifiers for the World Beach Games
  - Winner (1): 2022
- Intercontinental Cup
  - Runner-up (1): 2018
- Euro Winners Cup
  - Winner (1): 2018
- Mundialito de Clubes
  - Winner (1): 2015

=== Individual ===
All are "best goalkeeper" awards unless stated:

- FIFA Beach Soccer World Cup (1):
  - Golden Glove: 2013
- Beach Soccer Stars (3):
  - World's best goalkeeper: 2014
  - World's top 3 best goalkeepers: 2022
  - World dream team: 2014
- Euro Beach Soccer League (5):
  - Superfinal: 2013, 2014
  - Regular season stages: 2014 (x1), 2016 (x1), 2019 (x1)
- UEFA qualifiers for the World Beach Games (1): 2022
- Mundialito (1): 2023
- Euro Winners Cup (2): 2014, 2018
