= Euro Beach Soccer League =

- Organising body: BSWW
- Founded: 1998; 28 years ago
- Confederation: UEFA (Europe)
- Divisions: Division A Division B
- Number of clubs: ~25 (16 in Division A, others in Division B)
- Level on pyramid: 1–2
- Domestic cup: European Games
- International cup: Intercontinental Cup
- Current champions: Spain (6th title) (2026)
- Most championships: Portugal (9 titles)
- Broadcaster(s): StreamWay+
- Website: Beach Soccer Worldwide
- Current: 2026 Euro Beach Soccer League

The Euro Beach Soccer League (EBSL) is the premier competition in beach soccer featuring European men's national teams. The competition has been held annually since its establishment in 1998, making it the oldest beach soccer tournament in Europe and one of the oldest in the world, only surpassed in longevity by the World Cup and Mundialito events. The EBSL was originally created to promote the newly founded sport in Europe in a competitive environment and was originally called the European Pro Beach Soccer League until 2004.

Organised by Beach Soccer Worldwide (BSWW), the teams compete in two divisions; A, consisting of the league's 16 best nations and B, consisting of the other teams competing that year. A system of promotion and relegation exists between the two divisions.

The typical league format is played in two phases; a regular season and a post-season. Teams play in stages of fixtures during the regular season, hoping to earn enough points for their division's league table to qualify for their respective post-season events; for Division A, the Superfinal, in which league title is then directly contested, and for Division B, the Promotion Final, in which promotion to A is then directly contested.

The competition takes place between May and September. The league's rounds of matches are staged in a series of locations across Europe in which multiple nations gather to play, having spread as far west as Dublin, Ireland and as far east as Baku, Azerbaijan. Matches take place every few weeks over the course of a weekend, including Fridays. At most, Division A teams play 10 games a season and Division B nations, 7 games.

38 nations of Europe have competed since the initial 1998 season. Only three have featured in every season (Note: This statement is excluding of the extremely anomalous 2020 season which was heavily affected by the COVID-19 pandemic – Spain and Italy did not compete that year.) – Italy, Portugal and Spain. The most successful nation is Portugal with nine titles, followed by Spain with six titles (also the current champions), and Russia with five. Italy have four titles, Switzerland have two titles, whilst Germany, France and Ukraine have one title each.

== History ==
Former EBSL logo timeline

1998–2003
The original logo. Used until the competition was renamed from the then European Pro Beach Soccer League.

2004–2008
Introduced in view of the name change in 2004. Accompanied by the Mastercard logo (as lead sponsors) until they ended their sponsorship in 2007.

2009–2015
Accompanying the new league structure in 2009 was the introduction of a new logo.

2016–2021
A new logo design for all BSWW competitions was announced in 2016. The EBSL logo was altered to match the new designs.

=== Foundation ===
After beach soccer's inception in 1992, the sport grew quickly. In 1996, the Pro Beach Soccer Tour (PBST) was created by Beach Soccer Company (BSC) – a series of exhibition events across the world, totalling in 60 games by the end of 1997. In Europe, the interest generated was particularly prevalent. Unsatisfied with the status quo, representatives of six European beach soccer promoter entities met with the Graham family and Gabby Roe of BSC at Le Méridien hotel in Monte Carlo, Monaco, to discuss how to collectively grow the European game, namely Natalie Aubery (Monaco), Joël Cantona (France), Alex Colombo (Italy), Nicola Owen (Germany), Eric Steffan (Portugal), and Joan Cusco and Santi Soler (Spain). They perceived that the media, sponsors and fans in Europe desired a multi-event, summer-long competition, touring the continent with consistent national teams and star players to support in a competitive environment. Consequently, BSC proceeded to launch the first European Pro Beach Soccer League season (EPBSL) in 1998, moulded and structured as such.

=== Initial seasons (1998–2000) ===
In the inaugural season of 1998, seven countries took part, mostly from Western and Southern Europe – France, Spain, Germany, Italy, Yugoslavia, Switzerland and Portugal. The league events travelled across Europe, with multiple countries hosting rounds of fixtures called stages (see defunct formats for more), concluding in Monte Carlo, which saw Germany crowned champions – their only title to date. During this time, Prince Albert of Monaco became Honorary President of the EPBSL and Monte Carlo was chosen to host the final stage each year including a gala event. Spain went on to win the 1999 and 2000 editions, the latter famed for its conclusion with the title decided in the very last match of the season with the narrow 6–5 Spanish defeat of arch-rivals Portugal. Austria and the Netherlands also debuted during these years.

Much of the success of the league's early years is attributed to the recognisable retired association footballers who made the transition to the sand, attracting fans to attend and watch matches on TV. These included Eric Cantona, Michel, Claudio Gentile, Uli Stielike, Karl-Heinz Rummenigge, Emilio Butragueño and Andreas Brehme to name a few. Meanwhile, dedicated beach soccer players, without the footballing fame of these stars also made a name for themselves, most notably the young duo of Spain's Amarelle and Portugal's Madjer.

=== Introduction of the Superfinal and multiple divisions (2001–2005) ===
In 2001, thanks to a merger deal, Beach Soccer Worldwide (BSWW) became the league's new organisers. Subsequently, the competition underwent significant changes. The league was split into two phases – the existing regular season and a new post-season play-off phase called the Superfinal, in which the league champions would be determined instead of via the end of regular season league table. Furthermore, BSWW divided the nations of the league into two divisions (A and B) in 2002, with a short-lived third division (C) created in 2004 (see defunct formats for more). The league also doubled as the qualification route for European nations to the upcoming edition of the Beach Soccer World Championships.

Despite the new format, Iberian dominance continued initially. Spain claimed their third straight title in 2001, two-time runners-up Portugal finally claimed their first title in 2002, and Spanish superiority resumed as they won their fourth crown after just six seasons in 2003. However, such dominance ended with the results of 2004 and 2005 which finally saw new champions in France and Italy respectively, overcoming Spain and Portugal in the final of each respectively. Nations like England, Norway, Belgium, Poland, Hungary, Ukraine and Russia all joined the league during this period, expanding participation to more northern and eastern Europeans nations. However, they failed to make an impact against the superior, established Southern European quartet. Personnel-wise, European teams were quickly transitioning away from being composed of retired star footballers to comprising predominately younger players attempting a career in the new sport.

Commercially, the league enjoyed some of its greatest success at this time; BSWW secured "vastly expanded television coverage" of the EBSL from such networks as Sky Sports (UK), RAI (Italy), SIC (Portugal) and NRK (Norway) and "unprecedented demand from promoters" to host league events. Major sponsorship deals were also struck with McDonald's, Coca-Cola and MasterCard; in 2004, the competition was renamed to the shortened Euro Beach Soccer League (EBSL), and the latter became lead sponsors.

=== Third format era (2006–2007) ===
The EBSL once again underwent significant changes in 2006, entering its third distinct format era. In summary, the new format had Division B start and complete their regular season first, early in the summer. The top teams then qualified to play in Division A, to compete alongside the top tier's automatic entrants, which began its regular season later in the summer. The top teams at the end of the Division A regular season then proceeded to the Superfinal to contest the league title as usual. (see defunct formats for more)

Having switched from Monte Carlo to Marseille in 2005, BSWW made the French city the Superfinal's permanent new home for 2006 and 2007. Its impressive hosting was key in FIFA's decision to award the city as hosts of the 2008 World Cup. The EBSL continued to double as the World Cup qualification route for European nations into the FIFA era.

These years saw the Iberian nations return to the summit; Spain won their fifth title in 2006 and Portugal their second in 2007, narrowly denying France their own second crown by a single goal in the final. However the latter year saw the birth of a new European power, that of Russia who finished top of the Division A regular season table in just their first season in the top tier, ultimately finishing third in the Superfinal. This era saw the rise of the likes of Switzerland and Poland, establishing themselves as regular participants of the top tier.

=== Promotion and relegation (2009–present) ===
The 2008 season was greatly affected by the scheduling of the World Cup which shortened the league's calendar. Because of the time constraints, the incumbent format could not be implemented. Instead, all teams competed in one unified division in what was ultimately an anomalous season in terms of its format.

Heading into the 2009 season, BSWW did not return to the 2006–07 format but instead completely revamped the league's configuration, primarily introducing a system of promotion and relegation between Divisions A and B by making the Superfinal a Division A only event and establishing a second post-season event exclusively for Division B nations, the Promotion Final, in which promotion is achieved. The regular seasons of the two divisions were also reverted back to occur concurrently as in 2001–05. (see current format for more)

During this era participation has continued to increase, breaking the 20-team barrier in 2011 and a record 27 nations competed in 2017, seeing participation expand to some of Europe's least populated nations such as Lithuania and Andorra, and to the continent's most eastern periphery with Azerbaijan and Kazakhstan debuting and becoming league regulars. The Superfinal and regular season stages have also spread out further across Europe; the former has been staged in Estonia, The Netherlands and Russia, whilst the latter have been hosted in Serbia, Hungary and Ukraine. Russia's rise culminated with their first title in 2009; with four further titles since, Russia equalled Spain and Portugal's long standing record tally of five titles in 2017, and at least finishing in the top four every season from 2007–19, the Russians have cemented their position as a superpower. During this period Portugal have continued to be a dominant side, becoming only the second team after Spain (1999–2001) to win three titles in a row (2019–2022), to move clear as the record-holding champions, now with eight. Meanwhile, Switzerland and Ukraine claimed their maiden crowns, and Belarus have also broken into the elite by reaching their first final in 2021. On the other hand, this era has seen the demise of nations like France, who saw relegation to Division B in 2010 and again 2012, meanwhile Spain have only made two finals during these ten years, despite their five previous titles.

The 2020s began with a series of disruptions to the league. The COVID-19 pandemic severely impacted the 2020 season and also somewhat affected the 2021 season. And in 2022, longstanding and major league members, Russia and Belarus, were excluded from the competition in response to the Russian invasion of Ukraine.

== Competition structure ==
=== Current format ===
In 2009, BSWW overhauled the existing league structure and introduced a new format that remains in use, featuring a system of promotion and relegation between two divisions of teams. The league currently consists of two phases – a regular season, typically taking place between June and August, and two post-season events, taking place in August or September. Minor amendments to the format were made in 2013 that focused on increasing the size of Division A and the number of teams advancing to the post-season events.

==== Divisions A and B ====
The nations of the EBSL are divided between two divisions; A, the league's top tier, and B, the league's lower tier. Each season, Division A nations aim to win the EBSL title, whilst Division B nations aim to be promoted to Division A, with one promotion spot available per season.

12 countries comprise Division A. These are the league's best teams. It features the top 11 finishers from the previous year's final Division A regular season league table, plus the one nation who earned promotion from Division B at end of the preceding season (the Promotion Final winners). Division B hosts all other participants, those with lesser ability on the sand than those in the top tier. The division features teams from the previous Division B season who were not promoted, nations returning after an absence from competing, the team relegated from Division A at the end of the previous season, and any debutants. Hence the total number of nations competing in Division B varies by season and as such is not fixed in size like Division A.

==== Regular season ====
The league begins with the regular season, consisting of multiple rounds of fixtures taking place every few weeks. Each set of matches is treated as its own event, known as a stage. Each stage of the season is hosted in a different European country. Typically, both Division A and Division B matches are organised to take place together during the same stage event. Overall, Division A nations generally take part in two stages per year and Division B nations, one stage each.

In each stage, the participating teams compete in groups of four in a round robin format (sometimes Division B nations play in groups of three) over the course of three days (usually Friday, Saturday and Sunday). Teams earn points for their divisions’ league table for winning matches during these stages, trying to earn enough to qualify for their respective divisions' post-season events (see below). The team who earned the most points during the event are declared stage winners and are presented with a trophy. Individual awards are also presented for the MVP, best goalkeeper and top scorer.

End of regular season scenario:

Division A:
Pos	Qualification
1	Top 8 advance to Superfinal
2	Top 8 advance to Superfinal
3	Top 8 advance to Superfinal
4	Top 8 advance to Superfinal
5	Top 8 advance to Superfinal
6	Top 8 advance to Superfinal
7	Top 8 advance to Superfinal
8	Top 8 advance to Superfinal
9	9th–11th: season ends here
10	9th–11th: season ends here
11	9th–11th: season ends here
12	12th place into Promotion Final

Division B:
Pos	Qualification
1	Top 7 (stage winners, best runners-up) advance to Promotion; Final
2	Top 7 (stage winners, best runners-up) advance to Promotion; Final
3	Top 7 (stage winners, best runners-up) advance to Promotion; Final
4	Top 7 (stage winners, best runners-up) advance to Promotion; Final
5	Top 7 (stage winners, best runners-up) advance to Promotion; Final
6	Top 7 (stage winners, best runners-up) advance to Promotion; Final
7	Top 7 (stage winners, best runners-up) advance to Promotion; Final
8	8th and below: season ends here
9	8th and below: season ends here
10	8th and below: season ends here
11	8th and below: season ends here
↓	8th and below: season ends here

==== Superfinal ====
The post-season event for Division A teams is called the Superfinal. Of the 12 teams in Division A, the top eight ranking nations with the most points in the Division A league table at the end of the regular season proceed to the Superfinal. In this event, the participating nations directly compete for the league title. A four-day event, the eight teams are split into two groups of four, competing in a round robin format. The two group winners then proceed to the final, with the winner of this concluding match crowned champions of the EBSL.

==== Promotion Final ====
The post-season event for Division B nations is called the Promotion Final, staged in parallel with the Superfinal during same dates and in the same location. The top seven ranking nations with the most points in the Division B league table at the end of the regular season proceed to the Promotion Final. In this event, teams directly compete for the single promotion spot available. An eighth nation also takes part, the team that finished last in Division A, who compete to try and defend their Division A status.

The eight teams are split into two groups of four, competing in a round robin format. The two group winners then proceed to the final to play for promotion. The Division B nation which wins this match is promoted to Division A the next season, with the team bottom of Division A relegated. However, if the defending Division A team successfully wins the Promotion Final, fending off the challenge of the Division B teams, they will retain their Division A status for the next season, denying any prospective Division B team promotion.

=== Defunct formats ===
1998–2000 (original format)
- The participating teams played eight games a season, earning points for the league table, with the team top of the table becoming league champions after all the fixtures were complete. There was no post-season; the final standings, including the league champions, were decided purely by the regular season outcome alone.
- Each participating nation hosted a round of fixtures otherwise known as a stage, played as small, four-team knock-out tournaments over the course of two days. Day 1 consisted of the semi-finals and day 2, the final and third place deciding match. The teams earned points towards the league table during these stages by winning matches and earning bonus points for being stage winners or being runners-up.

2001–2005 (changes made to the 1998–00 format)
Post-season established (Superfinal):
- The Superfinal was introduced as a new post-season phase of the league's season from 2001 onward; from this edition forward, the team top of the league table at the end of the regular season would no longer be crowned league champions as in 1998–00. Instead, the teams occupying the top handful of spots of the league table at end of the regular season would advance to a new playoff event to be known as the Superfinal, in which the title would then be contested directly by these teams, with the winner becoming league champions. The Superfinal was played as a knockout tournament. A four team event in 2001, this number was increased to six in 2002 and eight in 2004.

Stages:

- The format of the regular season stages was also changed for the 2001 season and onward. They remained four-team events but the format was altered to having the stages played in a round robin style, with the results tallied up in a table to determine the winners of the stage based on which team had gained the most points over the course of the event. Stages now took place over three days. The bonus points awarded in previous years for being stage winners and runners-up was also scrapped. Teams now earned points for the league table solely on match wins.

Divisions, Superfinal berths:

- In 2002, the nations of the league competing that season were divided into two divisions based on ability; a top tier for the league's best teams and a lower tier for the season's other, less proficient entrants. The nations competed exclusively against other teams in their own division during the regular season. Each division held separate regular season events, in different locations and during different dates but which continued to be hosted by all participating nations (when possible). The divisions were officially named A and B respectively in 2003.
- At the end of their regular seasons, the top-ranking teams from both Division A and Division B qualified for the Superfinal. In recognition of the quality of the nations in the top division compared to the bottom division, Division A was rewarded with more qualification berths to the Superfinal than in Division B throughout this era. For example, in 2002, the top division had four teams proceed to the Superfinal whereas only two teams from the bottom division progressed.
- In 2004, a third division, C, was created. The Superfinal qualification berths were reshuffled to accommodate this third division, once again recognising the quality of the cohorts in each group; teams in Division A received the most berths (4), B fewer than A (3) and C fewer than B (1).
- BSWW expanded and reduced the sizes of the divisions every season during this era. Teams were moved around between divisions from the end of one season to the start of the next in order to make up the numbers decided on by BSWW for the division in question going into the new season. However this was not a relegation/promotion process. The allocation of teams into each division at the start of each season was by the discretion of BSWW and not simply because of the performance of the team in question in the previous season earning that team a move between divisions.

2006–2007 (changes made to the 2001–05 format)
Divisions:
- In 2006, Division C was scrapped. In both 2006 and 2007, France, Italy, Spain and Portugal were given automatic entry into Division A. All other teams entering the EBSL's season were placed into Division B.
- Instead of the Division A and B regular seasons taking place concurrently as in the 2001–05 era, this format had Division B start and complete their regular season first, early in the summer. Division B nations no longer directly qualified for the Superfinal either. In place of this, the top four nations at the end of the Division B regular season then qualified to play in Division A, within the same season, which began its regular season later in the summer, to compete alongside the top tier's aforementioned automatic entrants. Note this was not a promotion system.

Superfinal:

- The top six teams of the Division A table at the end of the regular season advanced to the Superfinal to compete for the league title. The Superfinal was played as a multi-stage event during this era. Starting with a round robin group stage, the six teams were split into two groups of three. The top two teams moved onto the knockout stage, starting with the semi-finals.

Stages:

- Division A stages were altered to be knockout tournaments involving all eight teams of the division. The regular season consisted of four stages, with one hosted in each of the four automatic entrants' countries. The points system was also amended – points were earned for the league table based on a nation's final placement (1st–8th) in each sage, not for match wins.
- Division B stages remained four-team round robin events in 2006, with an additional final stage, played as a knockout tournament, consisting of the best teams after the previous stages, to then directly determine the four teams that would play in Division A later in the season. In 2007, Division B consisted of one single stage involving all teams. The nations were split into groups, competing against other members of their groups, with the winners earning a place in Division A.

== Locations of events ==
Countries that have hosted regular season stages and the Superfinal Countries that have only hosted regular season stages Countries that have competed in the EBSL but have not hosted any events

Location has hosted both regular season stages and/or the Superfinal
Location has only hosted regular season stages

Part of the original concept of the EBSL was to link the multiple promoters of beach soccer in the different countries of Europe under the umbrella of a single Europe-wide competition. This was to ensure a strong structure of development for beach soccer throughout the Old Continent through such unity. This has meant that BSWW have hosted and continue to host EBSL events right across Europe.

The table below shows the countries which have hosted EBSL events, in order from that which has hosted the most, down to the least. The specific host towns and cities in each country are also listed. Overall, in 24 seasons, there have been 138 events hosted in 69 different locations in Europe.

Nation	Stages hosted	Location(s)	Superfinals hosted	Location(s)	Total events hosted
Italy	20	Siracusa x2, Scoglitti x2, Cattolica, Riccione, Rome, Lignano Sabbiadoro x4, San Benedetto del Tronto x2, Ostia, Cervia, Ravenna, Terracina x2, Catania x2	3	Catania, Terracina, Alghero	23
Portugal	14	Figueira da Foz x3, Vila Nova de Gaia, Estoril, Carcavelos x2, Portimão x3, Nazaré x4	6	Vila Real de Santo; António x2, Lisbon, Figueira da Foz x2, Nazaré	20
France	13	Saint-Galmier, Marseille x5, Palavas-les-Flots, Tignes x4, Béziers, Valence	3	Marseille x3	16
Spain	13	Sant Joan d'Alacant, La Coruña, Mallorca x7, Cádiz, Malaga, Torredembarra, Sanxenxo	2	Torredembarra x2	15
Russia	7	Moscow x7	1	Moscow	8
Austria	8	Vienna, Kitzbühel, Linz x5, Sankt Pölten	0	—	8
Monaco	3	Monte Carlo x3	3	Monte Carlo x3	6
Netherlands	4	Scheveningen, The Hague x3	1	The Hague	5
Switzerland	5	Zurich, Basel, Bern x2, Interlaken	0	—	5
Germany	5	Travemunde, Berlin x2, Warnemunde x2	0	—	5
England	4	London, Brighton x2, Minehead	0	—	4
Hungary	4	Siofok x4	0	—	4
Belgium	2	Knokke, Brussels	1	Knokke	3
Greece	2	Athens x2	0	—	2
Norway	2	Stavanger x2	0	—	2
Poland	2	Poddebice, Sopot	0	—	2
Turkey	2	Alanya, Istanbul	0	—	2
Estonia	0	—	1	Pärnu	1
Azerbaijan	1	Baku	0	—	1
Belarus	1	Minsk	0	—	1
Ireland	1	Dublin	0	—	1
Moldova	1	Chișinău	0	—	1
Serbia	1	Belgrade	0	—	1
Ukraine	1	Kiev	0	—	1
FR Yugoslavia (now Montenegro)	1	Budva	0	—	1

== Teams ==
Division A member Division B member Inactive Never competed

As of the 2021 season, 24 teams comprise the Euro Beach Soccer League, split between two divisions: Division A consisting of 12 teams and Division B comprising 12 teams. Teams move between the divisions through a promotion and relegation process established in the 2009 season. One team a season can be promoted/relegated from each division. Prior to 2009, teams were simply allocated to divisions at the start of each season.

An eight team group from 2009 to 2012, the size of the top division has been fixed at 12 since 2013, seeing four extra teams promoted at the end of the 2012 season. However, teams returning after an absence from competing and new nations debuting are placed into the bottom division, hence its size, and the overall number nations participating in the league, has varied every season throughout the history of the competition.

Having started with seven nations in 1998 (France, Spain, Germany, Italy, Yugoslavia, Switzerland and Portugal), the milestone of 10 participating nations was reached in the 2002 season and 20 teams first took part in the 2011 season; the record is currently 27 teams, first achieved in the 2017 season. Overall, 36 different nations have competed since the opening edition. 20 members of UEFA are yet to enter the league. National teams such as Croatia, Malta and Slovenia have expressed interest in joining the league in the past, but have so far not participated.

=== Current line-up ===
2025 season results:

Key:

↑↑↑ Won the Promotion Final and were promoted up from Division B at end of the season.
↓↓↓ Lost the Promotion Final and were relegated down from Division A at end of the season.

Division A
Team	EBSL Debut	2025 results		Total seasons	Years active	Since promotion & relegation began in 2009			Titles	Last
Team	EBSL Debut	Regular season	Super final	Total seasons	Years active	Seasons in Div. A (Note: Excludes absent years.)	Seasons in Div. B	Start of current spell in Div. A (Note: Includes absent years in current spell.)	Titles	Last
Belarus	2009	3rd	3rd	15	debut–2019, 2021, 2023–	11	4	2023	—N/a	
Czech Republic	2007	10th	10th	18	debut–2019, 2021, 2023–	2	13	2024	—N/a	
Denmark	2016	8th	7th	8	debut–2019, 2022-	3	5	2023	—N/a	
Estonia	2008	14th	13th	15	debut, 2012–	4	11	2022	—N/a	
France	1998	7th	8th	29	debut–	17	1	2013	1	2004
Georgia	2018	13th	16th ↓↓↓	6	debut–2019, 2022-	1	5	2025	—N/a	
Germany	1998	11th	11th	27	debut–2002, 2004–07, 2009–	14	4	2013	1	1998
Italy	1998	1st	1st	28	debut–2019, 2021–	17	0	2009	4	2025
Latvia	2022	16th	15th ↓↓↓	3	debut, 2024–	1	2	2025	—N/a	
Moldova	2013	12th	12th	12	debut–2019, 2021-	3	9	2022	—N/a	
Poland	2004	9th	9th	22	debut–2019, 2021–	17	0	2015	—N/a	
Portugal	1998	5th	5th	29	debut–	18	0	2009	9	2024
Spain	1998	2nd	2nd	28	debut–2019, 2021–	17	0	2009	5	2006
Switzerland	1998	4th	6th	27	debut, 2001–	18	0	2009	2	2022
Turkey	2002	15th	14th	17	debut, 2004, 2007–2019, 2021-	8	9	2023	—N/a	
Ukraine	2004	6th	4th	18	debut–2007, 2011–2022, 2025–	12	2	2025	1	2016
Division B
Team	EBSL Debut	2025 results		Total seasons	Years active	Since promotion & relegation began in 2009				
Team	EBSL Debut	Regular season	Promo Final	Total seasons	Years active	Seasons in Div. A	Seasons in Div. B	Start of current spell in Div. B	Last Div. A appearance	
Azerbaijan	2009	-	3rd	16	debut–2019, 2021–2023, 2025–	7	9	2025	2023	
England	2001	-	7th	23	debut–2019, 2022-	0	14	2022	2004	
Kazakhstan	2014	-	4th	8	debut, 2016–2019, 2021-2022, 2025–	0	8	2025	—N/a	
Lithuania	2017	-	1st ↑↑↑	8	debut–2019, 2021–	1	7	2025	2024	
Malta	2022	-	6th	4	debut-	0	4	2022	—N/a	
Norway	2002	-	8th	22	debut–2005, 2007–2019, 2021-	1	17	2021	2009	
Romania	2009	-	2nd ↑↑↑	15	debut–2013, 2015–2019, 2021-	7	9	2025	2024	

=== Inactive teams ===
Of the 36 nations that have competed at some point since the start of the EBSL, 16 are currently inactive – absent from competing in the league in recent years, but may return to compete again in the future. However, note that Monaco are not a FIFA member and so are not eligible to return to compete – their solo appearance in 2004 took place before FIFA became governing body of beach soccer.

Team	Total seasons	Years active	Last active
Andorra	10	2008–09, 2011–18	7 years ago
Austria	8	1999, 2002–06, 2008, 2014	11 years ago
Belgium	4	2003–06	19 years ago
Bulgaria	7	2013–14, 2016-19, 2021	4 years ago
Finland	1	2019	6 years ago
Greece	19	2004–19, 2021-24	1 year ago
Hungary	13	2004–05, 2007–08, 2010, 2012–19	6 years ago
Israel	4	2007, 2010–11, 2013	12 years ago
Monaco	1	2004	21 years ago
Netherlands	14	2000, 2004–06, 2008–14, 2016–17, 2019	6 years ago
Republic of Ireland	1	2001	24 years ago
Russia	16	2005, 2007-2019, 2021	4 years ago
Serbia	4	1998 (Note: As FR Yugoslavia. Serbia, as the successor nation, debuted in 2016.), 2016–18	7 years ago
Slovakia	2	2021, 2023	2 years ago
Sweden	3	2004, 2021, 2023	2 years ago

== Results ==
=== Season-by-season ===
The results shown were decided via the Superfinal since 2001 and via the end of season league table between 1998 and 2000.

The awards shown were presented after the Superfinal. However note that the awards presented to the players listed between 1998 and 2007 were based on those players' performances and goals amassed over the entire season. From 2008 onwards, season-encompassing awards were made defunct – the players listed received the awards based solely on their performance in the season-ending Superfinal.

Year	Winners	Runners-up	Third place	Fourth place	Season-long awards		
Year	Winners	Runners-up	Third place	Fourth place	Best player	Top scorer(s)	Best goalkeeper
1998 details	Germany	Italy	Portugal	Spain	(Spain) Ramiro Amarelle	(Spain) Ramiro Amarelle (24 goals)	Not awarded
1999 details	Spain	France	Portugal	Italy	(Portugal) Madjer	(Spain) Quique Setién (20 goals)	(Portugal) Zé Miguel
2000 details	Spain	Portugal	France	Italy	(Spain) Ramiro Amarelle	(Spain) Ramiro Amarelle (15 goals)	(Spain) Abel
2001 details	Spain	Portugal	Italy	France	(Spain) Ramiro Amarelle	(Portugal) Madjer (40 goals)	(Spain) Roberto Valeiro
2002 details	Portugal	Spain	France	Turkey	(Italy) Gianni Fruzzetti	(Portugal) Alan (31 goals)	(Spain) Roberto Valeiro
2003 details	Spain	France	Portugal	Switzerland	(Spain) Ramiro Amarelle	(Portugal) Madjer (34 goals)	(Switzerland) Adrian Lingenhag
2004 details	France	Portugal	Ukraine	Italy	(Spain) David Cordon	(Portugal) Madjer (30 goals)	(Spain) Roberto Valeiro
2005 details	Italy	Portugal	France	Switzerland	(Italy) Cristiano Scalabrelli	(Spain) Ramiro Amarelle (37 goals)	(Portugal) Bruno Silva
2006 details	Spain	Portugal	Poland	Italy	(Portugal) Madjer	(Portugal) Madjer (30 goals)	(Spain) Roberto Valeiro
2007 details	Portugal	France	Russia	Spain	(Switzerland) Dejan Stankovic	(Switzerland) Dejan Stankovic and (Spain) Ramiro Amarelle (24 goals)	(Russia) Andrey Bukhlitskiy
2008 details	Portugal	Netherlands	Russia	Italy	Superfinal awards		
2008 details	Portugal	Netherlands	Russia	Italy	(Portugal) Madjer	(Portugal) Madjer (11 goals)	(Netherlands) Ran Reijer
2009 details	Russia	Portugal	Italy	Spain	(Portugal) Madjer	(Italy) Paolo Palmacci and (Portugal) Madjer (7 goals)	(Russia) Andrey Bukhlitskiy
2010 details	Portugal	Italy	Russia	Switzerland	(Portugal) Madjer	(Switzerland) Dejan Stankovic (8 goals)	(Russia) Andrey Bukhlitskiy
2011 details	Russia	Switzerland	Portugal	Romania	(Switzerland) Dejan Stankovic	(Russia) Dmitry Shishin (7 goals)	(Switzerland) Valentin Jäeggy
2012 details	Switzerland	Russia	Italy	Romania	(Russia) Dmitry Shishin	(Switzerland) Dejan Stankovic (7 goals)	(Switzerland) Valentin Jäeggy
2013 details	Russia	Portugal	Switzerland	Spain	(Russia) Ilya Leonov	(Switzerland) Dejan Stankovic (9 goals)	(Spain) Dona
2014 details	Russia	Spain	Portugal	Switzerland	(Switzerland) Noël Ott	(Russia) Anatoly Peremitin and (Spain) Llorenç Gómez (7 goals)	(Spain) Dona
2015 details	Portugal	Ukraine	Russia	Spain	(Ukraine) Ihor Borsuk	(Switzerland) Dejan Stankovic (13 goals)	(Portugal) Elinton Andrade
2016 details	Ukraine	Portugal	Russia	Spain	(Portugal) Bê Martins	(Italy) Paolo Palmacci (7 goals)	(Ukraine) Vitaliy Sydorenko
2017 details	Russia	Portugal	Italy	Spain	(Russia) Artur Paporotnyi	(Switzerland) Noël Ott (9 goals)	(Russia) Maxim Chuzhkov
2018 details	Italy	Spain	Portugal	Russia	(Spain) Llorenç Gómez	(Belarus) Ihar Bryshtel (8 goals)	(Italy) Simone Del Mestre
2019 details	Portugal	Russia	Spain	Italy	(Portugal) Jordan Santos	(Italy) Emmanuele Zurlo and (Turkey) Cem Keskin (8 goals)	(Russia) Maxim Chuzhkov
2020 details	Portugal	Switzerland	Ukraine	France	(Portugal) Léo Martins	(Switzerland) Dejan Stankovic (8 goals)	(Portugal) Elinton Andrade
2021 details	Portugal	Belarus	Italy	Spain	(Portugal) Léo Martins	(Russia) Boris Nikonorov (10 goals)	(Belarus) Kanstantsin Mahaletski
2022 details	Switzerland	Portugal	Italy	Spain	(Switzerland) Noël Ott	(Portugal) Léo Martins (13 goals)	(Portugal) Elinton Andrade
2023 details	Italy	Spain	Belarus	Portugal	(Italy) Marco Giordani	(Switzerland) Noël Ott (15 goals)	(Italy) Leandro Casapieri
2024 details	Portugal	Italy	Belarus	Spain	(Portugal) Bê Martins	(Portugal) Jordan Santos (11 goals)	(Portugal) Pedro Mano
2025 details	Italy	Spain	Belarus	Ukraine	(Italy) Alessandro Remedi	(Italy) Josep Junior (Note: Chiky Ardil (Spain), Léo Martins (Portugal) and Philipp Borer (Switzerland) also scored six goals however did not officially share the award for reasons unknown.) (6 goals)	(Italy) Leandro Casapieri
2026 details	Spain	Italy	Switzerland	Denmark	(Italy) Josep Junior	(Spain) Ramy Saghdani (11 goals)	(Spain) Pablo López

=== Successful teams ===
Team	Titles	Runners-up	Third place	Fourth place
Portugal	9 (2002, 2007, 2008, 2010, 2015, 2019, 2020, 2021, 2024)	10 (2000, 2001, 2004, 2005, 2006, 2009, 2013, 2016, 2017, 2022)	6 (1998, 1999, 2003, 2011, 2014, 2018)	1 (2023)
Spain	6 (1999, 2000, 2001, 2003, 2006, 2026)	5 (2002, 2014, 2018, 2023, 2025)	1 (2019)	10 (1998, 2007, 2009, 2013, 2015, 2016, 2017, 2021, 2022, 2024)
Russia	5 (2009, 2011, 2013, 2014, 2017)	2 (2012, 2019)	5 (2007, 2008, 2010, 2015, 2016)	1 (2018)
Italy	4 (2005, 2018, 2023, 2025)	4 (1998, 2010, 2024, 2026)	6 (2001, 2009, 2012, 2017, 2021, 2022)	6 (1999, 2000, 2004, 2006, 2008, 2019)
Switzerland	2 (2012, 2022)	2 (2011, 2020)	2 (2013, 2026)	4 (2003, 2005, 2010, 2014)
France	1 (2004)	3 (1999, 2003, 2007)	3 (2000, 2002, 2005)	2 (2001, 2020)
Ukraine	1 (2016)	1 (2015)	2 (2004, 2020)	1 (2025)
Germany	1 (1998)	–	–	–
Belarus	–	1 (2021)	3 (2023, 2024, 2025)	–
Netherlands	–	1 (2008)	–	–
Poland	–	–	1 (2006)	–
Romania	–	–	–	2 (2011, 2012)
Denmark	–	–	–	1 (2026)
Turkey	–	–	–	1 (2002)

=== Medals ===
Rank	Nation	Gold	Silver	Bronze	Total
1	Portugal (POR)	9	10	6	25
2	Spain (ESP)	5	5	1	11
3	Russia (RUS)	5	2	5	12
4	Italy (ITA)	4	3	6	13
5	Switzerland (SUI)	2	2	1	5
6	France (FRA)	1	3	3	7
7	Ukraine (UKR)	1	1	2	4
8	Germany (GER)	1	0	0	1
9	Belarus (BLR)	0	1	3	4
10	Netherlands (NED)	0	1	0	1
11	Poland (POL)	0	0	1	1
Totals (11 entries)		28	28	28	84

=== Promoted and relegated teams (Promotion Final results) ===
The following table lists the results from the final match of the Promotion Final – the secondary post-season event in existence since 2009 from which the winner is promoted from Division B to Division A. (see Competition structure#Promotion Final for more)

The table also shows which defending Division A team failed to defend their place in the top tier during the Promotion Final and were therefore relegated (if applicable). The promoted teams are also listed because, in some seasons, more teams than simply the Promotion Final winners gained promotion. These special circumstances are explained via footnotes.

Year	Final match			Outcome	
Year	Winners	Score	Runners-up	Team(s) promoted to Division A	Team relegated to Division B
2009	Romania	5–2	Greece	Romania	Norway
2010	Turkey	4–3	France	Turkey	France
2011	France	6–3	Turkey	France	Turkey
2012	Ukraine	1–1 (a.e.t.); 2–1 (p.)	Belarus	Ukraine; Belarus, (Note: Going into the 2013 season, BSWW decided to expand Division A from eight to 12 teams. This meant, along with Ukraine who earned promotion by winning the Promotion Final, the next top four ranked teams from the 2012 Promotion Final, despite not winning the event, were retrospectively handed Division A membership for 2013 in order to make up the numbers. France, the relegated Division A team, happened to be among these next top four teams and hence, despite originally being relegated, ultimately did not see relegation materialise for this reason and instead continued to compete in Division A.) Netherlands, France, Germany	France (revoked)
2013	France	2–1	Greece	France (retained Division A status) (Note: The defending Division A team successfully won the Promotion Final and therefore retained their Division A membership for next season, avoiding relegation.); Greece (Note: In 2014, Romania, a Division A team, decided not to compete. In order to ensure the usual 12 teams competed in Division A in 2014, Greece, as the runners-up from the 2013 Promotion Final, were retrospectively promoted to make up the numbers.)	None
2014	Hungary	6–4	Poland	Hungary; Poland (Note: In 2015, The Netherlands, a Division A team, decided not to compete. In order to ensure the usual 12 teams competed in Division A in 2015, the runners-up from the 2014 Promotion Final, were retrospectively promoted to make up the numbers. The runners-up happened to be the relegated Division A side, Poland, who ultimately did not see relegation materialise for this reason and instead continued to compete in Division A.)	Poland (revoked)
2015	Romania	6–6 (a.e.t.); 3–2 (p.)	Estonia	Romania	Hungary
2016	Azerbaijan	5–5 (a.e.t.); 4–3 (p.)	Hungary	Azerbaijan	Romania
2017	Turkey	4–2	Estonia	Turkey	Greece
2018	Germany	4–4 (a.e.t.); 4–3 (p.)	Romania	Germany (retained Division A status)	None
2019	Azerbaijan	2–1	Kazakhstan	Azerbaijan (retained Division A status)	None
2020	Cancelled due to the COVID-19 pandemic				
2021	Estonia	4–3	Turkey	Estonia	Turkey
2022	Moldova	5–3	Turkey	Moldova, Turkey, (Note: In 2022, BSWW announced that Division A would be expanded from 12 to 16 teams the following season. Therefore, the top four teams of the Promotion Final were all promoted in order to make up the numbers, rather than the usual one promotee. Similarly, no team was relegated – all incumbent teams in Division A retained their membership without having to defend their place in the Promotion Final.); Greece, Kazakhstan	None
2023	Lithuania	3–2	Czech Republic	Lithuania, Czech Republic	Azerbaijan, Greece
2024	Final was cancelled			Greece, Georgia	Lithuania, Turkey
2025	Lithuania	4–3	Romania	Lithuania, Romania	Latvia, Georgia

== Statistics ==
=== Regular season stage winners ===
The first phase of the EBSL is the regular season. The matches of the regular season have been organised as both small-scale knockout tournaments and also round robin tournaments known as stages; the latter is the current format being used. The team which earns the most points at the end of the stage are declared stage winners and receive a trophy.

The following tables list every nation that has ever won a stage and how many stages in total they have won, by division. For comparison, the number of stages said team has ever played in that division in order to achieve the number of stage victories is also shown.

==== Division A ====
This table shows the teams which have won Division A regular season stages.

Note:
1. Before divisions were introduced in 2002, the league consisted of a single division. For this table, the stages of that time have been counted as de facto Division A stages.
2. A single division was also used in 2008. For this table, if the team was a member of Division A in 2007, the stages of 2008 count. If they were a member of Division B in 2007, the stages count towards the Division B table.
3. No regular season stages took place in 2020 due to the effects of the COVID-19 pandemic on the competition.

Team	Stage Wins	Stages Pld	Win %	Full list of regular season stages won
Portugal	28	63	44.4%	'98 Figueira da Foz, '98 Monte Carlo, '99 La Coruna, '99 Scoglitti, '00 Vila Nova de Gaia, '01 Dublin, '01 Carcavelos, '01 Riccione, '02 Carcavelos, '02 Rome, '03 Estoril, '03 Brighton, '04 Marseille, '04 Portimao, '05 Tignes, '05 Figueira da Foz, '05 Mallorca, '06 Portimao, '07 Portimao, '09 Minehead, '11 The Hague, '12 Terracina, '14 Sopot, '17 Nazaré, '17 Siokof, '18 Baku, '22 Nazaré, '24 Nazaré
Spain	26	65	40%	'99 Siracusa, '99 Monte Carlo, '00 Mallorca, '00 Cadiz, '00 Monte Carlo, '01 London, '01 Marseille, '01 Malaga, '02 Marseille, '03 Marseille, '03 Lignano Sabbiadoro, '03 Mallorca, '04 Scoglitti, '04 Stavanger, '04 Mallorca, '06 Mallorca, '09 Béziers, '10 Marseille, '11 Bern, '16 Moscow, '16 Sanxenxo, '17 Belgrade, '18 Nazaré, 18' Warnemunde, '19 Nazaré, '25 El Puerto de Santa María
Russia	13	26	50.0%	'07 San Benedetto del Tronto, '07 Tignes, '08 Tignes, '09 Lignano Sabbiadoro, '10 Moscow, '11 Berlin, '12 Terracina, '12 Berlin, '13 Moscow, '14 Moscow, '17 Moscow, 18' Moscow, '21 Nazaré
Italy	11	64	17.2%	'98 Siracusa, '98 Sant Joan d'Alacant, '00 Saint-Galmier, '05 Cervia, '06 San Benedetto de Tronto, '09 Ostia, '15 Moscow, '19 Catania, '24 Tirrenia, '25 Castellammare di Stabia, '25 Chișinău
Switzerland	8	41	19.5%	'08 Lignano Sabbiadoro, '10 Lignano Sabbiadoro, '10 The Hague, '11 Ravenna, '12 Torredembarra, '13 Valence, '14 Catania, '15 Siofok
France	5	62	8.1%	'98 Montenegro, '99 Figueira da Foz, '00 Cattolica, '02 Mallorca, '07 Mallorca
Belarus	3	16	18.8%	'16 Siofok, '18 Minsk, '25 Batumi
Germany	3	32	9.4%	'98 Zurich, '98 Travemunde, '99 Vienna
Poland	3	34	8.8%	'06 Tignes, '13 Kiev, '13 The Hague
Ukraine	2	20	10%	'14 Siofok, '17 Warnemunde
Moldova	1	3	33.3%	'24 Chișinău

==== Division B ====
This table shows the teams which have won Division B regular season stages since the division was introduced in 2002.

Note:
1. The two Division C stages of 2004 and 2005 have also been counted towards this table.
2. A single division was also used in 2008. For this table, if the team was a member of Division B in 2007, the stages of 2008 count. If they were a member of Division A in 2007, the stages count towards the Division A table.
3. No regular season stages took place in 2020 due to the effects of the COVID-19 pandemic on the competition, nor in 2022.

Team	Stage Wins	Stages Pld	Win %	Full list of regular season stages won
Switzerland	9	17	52.9%	'02 Brighton, '02 Alanya, '03 Knokke, '04 Linz, '04 Interlaken, 05' Mallorca, (Note: Division C stage.) '06 Linz, '06 Scheveningen, '07 Athens (Note: The 2007 Athens stage title was shared between four teams.)
Turkey	6	17	35.3%	'02 Basel, '02 Kitzbuhel, '10 Bibione, '14 Siofok, '15 Siofok, '17 Moscow
Ukraine	4	8	50%	'04 Mallorca, '06 Poddebice, '12 Torredembarra, '24 Batumi
Austria	4	17	23.5%	'02 Linz, '02 Palavas-les-Flots, '03 Linz, '04 Mallorca
Israel	3	4	75.0%	'10 Moscow, '11 Bern, '13 Terracina
Azerbaijan	3	9	33.3%	'09 Minehead, '10 Lignano Sabbiadoro, '16 Siofok
Hungary	3	13	23.1%	'05 Linz, '10 Marseille, '17 Siofok
Czech Rep.	3	13	23.1%	'07 Athens, '11 Berlin, '16 Sanxenxo
Greece	3	17	17.6%	'13 The Hague, '19 Catania '24 Tirrenia
England	3	22	13.7%	'13 Valence, '17 Warnemunde, '18 Warnemunde
Belarus	2	4	50.0%	'09 Béziers, '12 Terracina
Poland	2	6	33.3%	'06 Sankt Pölten, '07 Athens
Kazakhstan	2	7	28.6%	'18 Moscow
Moldova	2	8	25.0%	'16 Moscow, 21' Chișinău
Estonia	2	9	22.2%	'14 Moscow, '17 Belgrade
Netherlands	2	12	16.7%	'06 Athens, '11 The Hague
Belgium	2	13	15.4%	'04 Istanbul, '04 Brussels
Norway	2	24	8.3%	'03 Stavanger, '03 Bern
France	1	1	100%	'11 Ravenna
Russia	1	2	50.0%	'07 Athens
Georgia	1	3	33.3%	'19 Nazaré
Lithuania	1	5	20%	'25 El Puerto de Santa María
Romania	1	7	14.3%	'09 Lignano Sabbiadoro
Bulgaria	1	7	14.3%	'18 Nazaré
Germany	1	15	6.7%	'12 Berlin

==== Teams without a stage win ====
The following teams have previously competed in Division A or B but currently have zero stage victories in that division. The notes that apply to the above two tables also apply here.

Division A
Team	Stages Pld
Greece	11
England	10
Romania	10
Netherlands	8
Azerbaijan	7
Norway	6
Turkey	6
Czech Republic	5
Austria	4
FR Yugoslavia	4
Republic of Ireland	3
Hungary	2
Estonia	1

Division B
Team	Stages Pld
Andorra	10
Denmark	4
Serbia	4
Sweden	2
Finland	1
Monaco	1
Slovakia	1

=== Superfinal appearances ===
The Superfinal is the post-season event in which the nations with the most points at the end of the regular season qualify to play in, with the winner becoming league champions.

The table below lists all the teams who have ever qualified for Superfinal and the total number of times said team has appeared in the event.

Portugal are the only team to appear in all 25 Superfinals. Of the eight winners of the EBSL, Switzerland appeared in most Superfinals before finally winning the title, claiming the crown at their ninth attempt. Meanwhile, Poland and Belarus have appeared in the most Superfinals (seven) without yet winning the title.

Key:

Boldface: Year the Superfinal (and hence the EBSL title) was won by this team
* In 2020, due to the COVID-19 pandemic, the regular season was cancelled; all teams received automatic entry into the Superfinal, however only five teams chose to compete.

Team	Superfinal appearances	Years
Portugal	25	2001, **2002**, 2003, 2004, 2005, 2006, **2007**, **2008**, 2009, **2010**, 2011, 2012, 2013, 2014, **2015**, 2016, 2017, 2018, **2019**, **2020***, 2021, 2022, 2023, **2024**, 2025
Italy	24	2001, 2002, 2003, 2004, **2005**, 2006, 2007, 2008, 2009, 2010, 2011, 2012, 2013, 2014, 2015, 2016, 2017, **2018**, 2019, 2021, 2022, **2023**, 2024, **2025**
Spain	22	**2001**, 2002, **2003**, 2004, 2005, **2006**, 2007, 2009, 2010, 2011, 2013, 2014, 2015, 2016, 2017, 2018, 2019, 2021, 2022, 2023, 2024, 2025
Switzerland	22	2003, 2004, 2005, 2007, 2008, 2009, 2010, 2011, **2012**, 2013, 2014, 2015, 2016, 2017, 2018, 2019, 2020*, 2021, **2022**, 2023, 2024, 2025
Russia	14	2007, 2008, **2009**, 2010, **2011**, 2012, **2013**, **2014**, 2015, 2016, **2017**, 2018, 2019, 2021
Ukraine	12	2004, 2006, 2013, 2014, 2015, **2016**, 2017, 2018, 2019, 2020*, 2021, 2025
France	11	2001, 2002, 2003, **2004**, 2005, 2006, 2007, 2008, 2015, 2020*, 2025
Belarus	10	2014, 2015, 2016, 2017, 2018, 2019, 2021, 2023, 2024, 2025
Poland	8	2006, 2008, 2009, 2012, 2013, 2017, 2021, 2024
Germany	5	2005, 2014, 2016, 2020*, 2023
Romania	4	2010, 2011, 2012, 2023
Austria	3	2002, 2004, 2005
Czech Republic	2	2008, 2024
Denmark	2	2023, 2025
Netherlands	2	2008, 2013
Turkey	2	2002, 2019
Estonia	1	2024
Azerbaijan	1	2018
Hungary	1	2005
Belgium	1	2004
Norway	1	2003

=== All-time tables ===
Division or status in 2020:

Currently in Division A
Currently in Division B
Inactive as of 2019
Country no longer exists

==== Division A ====
The all-time Division A table is a cumulative record of all match results, points and goals of every team that has ever played whilst being a member of Division A of the EBSL.

- For the purposes of this table, any match in a team played in the EBSL whilst holding division A membership counts, including match results from both the regular season and post season events – this encompasses matches against Division B teams during the Superfinal events of 2002–05 and as the defending Division A team during the Promotion Final since 2009.
- Before divisions were introduced in 2002, the league consisted of a single division. For this table the matches of that time have been counted as de facto Division A results.
- A solo division was also used a final time in 2008. For this table, if the team was a member of Division A in 2007, the results of '08 count. If they were not a member of Division A in '07, the results count towards the Division B all-time table.
- In 2006 and 2007 it was possible to play in both divisions in the same season. Note for teams for which this was the case, a season has been added to the relevant column in both tables along with that year's results from their matches in the relevant division.

Pos	Team	Seasons	Pld	W	W+	WP	L	GF	GA	GD	Pts	Av. Pts
1	**Portugal**	**23**	**228**	**149**	5	7	67	**1211**	830	**+381**	**464**	2.04
2	**Spain**	22	225	135	10	7	73	1137	847	+290	432	1.92
3	**Italy**	22	226	94	**14**	**12**	106	997	**977**	+20	322	1.42
4	**Russia**	13	122	85	4	3	30	589	357	+232	266	**2.18**
5	**France**	22	200	77	5	6	**112**	925	956	–31	247	1.24
6	**Switzerland**	17	153	66	4	4	79	784	732	+52	210	1.37
7	**Ukraine**	9	82	37	4	5	36	321	286	+35	124	1.51
8	**Poland**	14	112	27	6	9	70	444	542	–96	102	0.91
9	**Belarus**	7	60	24	3	2	31	212	192	+20	80	1.33
10	**Germany**	12	85	23	1	4	57	286	394	–108	75	0.88
11	Romania	5	43	10	1	1	31	144	244	–100	33	0.77
12	**Azerbaijan**	3	23	6	0	0	17	63	105	–42	18	0.78
13	Greece	5	37	3	2	2	30	86	180	–94	15	0.41
14	Netherlands	3	24	4	1	0	19	70	128	–58	14	0.58
15	**Turkey**	3	22	4	0	1	17	85	120	–35	13	0.59
16	Czech Republic	2	18	4	0	0	14	59	107	–48	12	0.67
17	Norway	2	21	4	0	0	17	67	132	–57	12	0.57
18	FR Yugoslavia	1	8	3	1	0	4	25	31	–6	11	1.38
18	Austria	1	8	3	0	0	5	40	42	–2	9	1.13
20	Hungary	1	7	2	0	0	5	29	37	–8	6	0.86
21	England	3	30	1	1	0	28	101	232	–131	5	0.17
22	Republic of Ireland	1	9	0	0	0	9	18	75	–57	0	0

==== Division B ====
The all-time Division B table is a cumulative record of all match results, points and goals of every team that has ever played whilst being a member of Division B of the EBSL since the division's establishment in 2002.

- For the purposes of this table, any match in a team played in the EBSL whilst holding Division B membership counts, including match results from both the regular season and post season events – this encompasses matches against Division A teams during the Superfinal events of 2002–05 and against the defending Division A team during the Promotion Final since 2009.
- The Division C results of 2004 and 2005 are also counted in this table
- A single division was used in 2008. For this table, if the team was not a member of Division A in '07, the results count. If they were a member of Division A in 2007, the results of '08 count towards the all-time Division A table.
- In 2006 and 2007 it was possible to play in both divisions in the same season. Note for teams for which this was the case, a season has been added to the relevant column in both tables along with that year's results from their matches in the relevant division.

Pos	Team	Seasons	Pld	W	W+	WP	L	GF	GA	GD	Pts	Av. Pts
1	**Hungary**	12	64	**40**	3	3	18	327	241	**+86**	**129**	2.02
2	Turkey	12	76	32	**5**	4	35	342	319	+23	110	1.45
3	Switzerland	6	60	34	3	1	22	**343**	266	+77	109	1.82
4	**England**	**16**	**84**	28	4	**5**	**47**	312	360	–48	99	1.18
5	**Czech Republic**	12	57	24	2	3	28	222	234	–12	79	1.39
6	**Greece**	7	48	22	1	0	25	191	180	+11	68	1.42
7	**Estonia**	9	47	21	1	2	23	183	162	+21	67	1.43
8	Azerbaijan	8	39	21	0	0	15	151	130	+21	67	1.72
9	Germany	9	47	22	0	0	25	221	227	–6	66	1.4
10	Austria	7	59	22	0	2	35	295	350	–55	65	1.1
11	Ukraine	6	25	18	0	1	6	130	80	+50	55	2.2
12	**Norway**	15	69	15	2	**5**	**47**	293	**367**	–74	54	0.78
13	**Romania**	4	30	14	1	4	11	110	95	+15	48	1.6
14	Belgium	4	39	15	1	1	22	170	196	–26	48	1.23
15	Netherlands	10	37	14	1	1	21	140	170	–30	45	1.22
16	**Bulgaria**	6	30	13	1	1	15	119	124	–5	42	1.4
17	Israel	4	19	12	0	1	6	86	59	+27	37	1.95
18	Poland	4	16	10	1	0	5	91	54	+37	32	2
19	**Kazakhstan**	5	22	10	0	1	11	88	83	+5	31	1.41
20	**Moldova**	7	32	7	2	0	23	100	144	–44	25	0.78
21	Belarus	4	18	7	1	1	9	62	50	+12	24	1.33
22	France	1	5	4	0	1	0	19	11	+8	13	**2.6**
23	**Denmark**	4	12	3	0	0	9	49	72	–23	9	0.75
24	Russia	2	5	2	0	1	2	20	17	+3	7	1.4
25	**Serbia**	4	11	2	0	1	8	29	42	–13	7	0.64
26	**Georgia**	2	10	2	0	0	8	29	53	–24	6	0.6
27	**Lithuania**	3	9	2	0	0	7	34	44	–10	6	0.67
28	**Finland**	1	3	1	0	0	2	10	12	–2	3	1
29	Sweden	1	2	0	0	0	2	4	15	–11	0	0
30	Andorra	10	27	0	0	0	27	49	189	–140	0	0
