= Dejan Stankovic (beach soccer) =

Swiss beach soccer player (born 1985)

Dejan Stanković Дејан Станковић
Personal information
- Date of birth: 25 August 1985 (age 41)
- Place of birth: Belgrade, Yugoslavia
- Height: 1.86 m (6 ft 1 in)
- Position: Forward

Team information
- Current team: Magazzini Generali Catania
- Number: 13

Senior career*
Years	Team	Apps	(Gls)
2010–2012	AC Milan (beach soccer)		

International career
2005–	Switzerland	300+	
- * Club domestic league appearances and goals

Dejan Stankovic (Serbian: Дејан Станковић / Dejan Stanković; born 25 August 1985) is a Swiss beach soccer player of Serbian origin. He plays in forward position.

In 2011 Stankovic co-founded Grasshoppers Club Beach Soccer where he worked as coach for seven years before retiring in 2018.

== Honours ==
=== National team ===
- Switzerland
  - Euro Beach Soccer League fourth place: 2005
  - Euro Beach Soccer Cup winner: 2005
  - Euro Beach Soccer League Italian Event winner: 2008

=== Individual ===
- Euro Beach Soccer League Best Player: 2007, 2011
- Euro Beach Soccer League Top Scorer: 2007, 2010
- Euro Beach Soccer Cup Top Scorer: 2007
- Euro Beach Soccer League French Event Best Player: 2007
- Euro Beach Soccer League Spanish Event Top Scorer: 2007
- FIFA Beach Soccer World Cup Golden Ball: 2009
- FIFA Beach Soccer World Cup Golden Shoe: 2009
