= Switzerland national beach soccer team =

Switzerland
- Nickname: Schweizer Beach Soccer Nati
- Association: Swiss Football Association
- Confederation: UEFA (Europe)
- Head coach: Angelo Schirinzi
- Captain: Mo Jaeggy
- Most caps: Dejan Stankovic (152)
- Top scorer: Dejan Stankovic (293)
- FIFA code: SUI
- BSWW ranking: 14 ▲2 (6 May 2026)
First colours
Second colours

First international
- Italy 6–2 Switzerland (Siracusa, Italy; 6 June 1998)

Biggest win
- Lithuania 1–16 Switzerland (Jesolo, Italy; 3 September 2016)

Biggest defeat
- Brazil 12–2 Switzerland (Rio de Janeiro, Brazil; 2 March 2004)

World Cup
- Appearances: 6 (first in 2009)
- Best result: (silver) Runners-up (2009)

Euro Beach Soccer League
- Appearances: 17 (first in 1998)
- Best result: (gold) Champions (2012)

Euro Beach Soccer Cup
- Appearances: 14 (first in 1998)
- Best result: (gold) Champions (2005)

The Switzerland national beach soccer team represents Switzerland in international beach soccer competitions and is controlled by the Swiss Football Association, the governing body for football in Switzerland.

== Results and fixtures ==
The following is a list of match results in the last 12 months, as well as any future matches that have been scheduled.

Legend

Win Draw Lose Fixture

=== 2021 ===
20 August 2021 FIFA Beach Soccer World Cup GS Group C	Switzerland	5–5 (a.e.t.) (4–3 p)	Brazil	Moscow, Russia
15:00 UTC+3	Borer 6', 26'; Stankovic 15', 36'; Ott 34'	Report (FIFA)	Edson Hulk 6'; Lucão 8'; Zé Lucas 24', 25', 27'	Stadium: Luzhniki Beach Soccer Stadium; Attendance: 2,500; Referee: Said Hachim (Madagascar)
	Penalties
	Ott (penalty missed); Steinemann (penalty scored); Misev (penalty scored); Borer (penalty scored); Stankovic (penalty scored)		(penalty scored) Lucão; (penalty scored) Zé Lucas; (penalty missed) Antonio; (penalty scored) Edson Hulk; (penalty missed) Rodrigo

22 August 2021 FIFA Beach Soccer World Cup GS Group C	Belarus	3–7	Switzerland	Moscow, Russia
19:00 UTC+3	Novikau 7'; Hardzetski 11'; Hapon 12'	Report (FIFA)	Stankovic 2', 33'; Hodel 17' (pen.), 34'; Mounoud 28'; Borer 36'; Steinemann 36' (pen.)	Stadium: Luzhniki Beach Soccer Stadium; Attendance: 1,856; Referee: Gionni Matticoli (Italy)

24 August 2021 FIFA Beach Soccer World Cup GS Group C	El Salvador	7–8	Switzerland	Moscow, Russia
15:00 UTC+3	Velásquez 4', 13', 21'; Robles 15', 25'; Perdomo 16' (pen.); Batres 20'	Report (FIFA)	Looser 4'; Stankovic 10', 32', 34', 36'; Ruettimann 12'; Borer 13'; Tchatat 31'	Stadium: Luzhniki Beach Soccer Stadium; Attendance: 1,049; Referee: Gustavo Domínguez (Paraguay)

26 August 2021 FIFA Beach Soccer World Cup Quarter-finals	Switzerland	10–1	Uruguay	Moscow, Russia
16:30 UTC+3	Ott 3'; Borer 8', 18' (pen.); Steinemann 10'; Hodel 20', 22', 24', 34'; Stankovic 32'; Bella 36' (o.g.)	Report (FIFA)	Bella 11'	Stadium: Luzhniki Beach Soccer Stadium; Attendance: 1,676; Referee: Juan Angeles (Dominican Republic)

28 August 2021 FIFA Beach Soccer World Cup Semi-finals	Russia	5–5 (a.e.t.) (5–4 p)	Switzerland	Moscow, Russia
18:00 UTC+3	Krasheninnikov 1'; Nikonorov 5', 34'; Kotenev 14'; Shkarin 36'	Report (FIFA)	Ott 6'; Hodel 18', 19', 30' (pen.); Stankovic 22'	Stadium: Luzhniki Beach Soccer Stadium; Attendance: 2,500; Referee: Ingilab Mammadov (Azerbaijan)
	Penalties
	Fedorov (penalty scored); Nikonorov (penalty scored); Shishin (penalty scored); Novikov (penalty scored); Krasheninnikov (penalty scored)		(penalty scored) Borer; (penalty missed) Steinemann; (penalty scored) Spaccarotella; (penalty scored) Hodel; (penalty scored) Stankovic

29 August 2021 FIFA Beach Soccer World Cup Third place match	Switzerland	9–7	Senegal	Moscow, Russia
18:00 UTC+3	Borer 9'; Hodel 11', 34', 36'; Mounoud 10', 16'; Spaccarotella 21'; Ott 21', 36' (pen.)	Report (FIFA)	Sylla 3'; Diatta 9', 13', 36'; Mam. Diagne 10'; Ndour 14'; Man. Diagne 33'	Stadium: Luzhniki Beach Soccer Stadium; Attendance: 1,753; Referee: Micke Palomino (Peru)

== Coaching staff ==
=== Current coaching staff ===
Technical Assistant: Georges Klauser
Team Doctor: Dr. Thomas Schwamborn

=== Managerial history ===
- Angelo Schirinzi (????–)

== Players ==
=== Current squad ===
The following players and staff members were called up for the 2021 FIFA Beach Soccer World Cup.

Note: Flags indicate national team as defined under FIFA eligibility rules; some limited exceptions apply. Players may hold more than one non-FIFA nationality.

No.	Pos.	Nation	Player
1	GK	SUI	Silvano Bruno Kessler
2	DF	SUI	Kevin Tchatat
3	MF	SUI	Benjamin Looser
4	MF	SUI	Michael Misev
5	MF	SUI	Jan Ostgen
6	FW	SUI	Tobias Steinemann
7	DF	SUI	Sandro Spaccarotella

No.	Pos.	Nation	Player
8	DF	SUI	Philipp Borer
9	FW	SUI	Dejan Stankovic
10	MF	SUI	Noël Ott
11	FW	SUI	Glenn Hodel
12	GK	SUI	Patrick Ruettimann
13	GK	SUI	Eliott Mounoud
14	DF	SUI	Mo Jäeggy

Head coach: Angelo Schirinzi
Assistant coach: Davor Ivcevic

== Competitive record ==
=== FIFA Beach Soccer World Cup ===
FIFA World Cup record										Qualification (UEFA) record								
Year	Round	Pos	Pld	W	W+	L	GF	GA	GD	Round	Pos	Pld	W	W+	L	GF	GA	GD
(Brazil) 2005	did not qualify									No qualification matches								
(Brazil) 2006	did not qualify									No qualification matches								
(Brazil) 2007	did not qualify									No qualification matches								
(France) 2008	did not qualify									Quarterfinals	–	5	4	0	1	30	12	+18
(United Arab Emirates) 2009	Runners-up	2nd	6	4	0	2	31	27	+4	Third place	3rd	7	6	0	1	39	27	+12
(Italy) 2011	Group stage	10th	3	1	0	2	16	15	+1	Fourth place	4th	7	4	0	3	36	27	+9
(French Polynesia) 2013	did not qualify									Round of 16	–	4	2	0	2	25	17	+8
(Portugal) 2015	Quarterfinals	8th	4	2	0	2	16	18	-2	Runners-up	2nd	8	6	1	1	53	23	+30
(The Bahamas) 2017	Quarterfinals	5th	4	2	1	1	21	17	+4	Runners-up	2nd	8	6	1	1	60	23	+37
(Paraguay) 2019	Quarterfinals	8th	4	1	1	2	22	22	0	Fourth place	4th	7	4	0	3	31	28	+3
(Russia) 2021	Third place	3rd	6	4	1	1	44	28	+16	Fifth place (Note: As the runners-up and a quarter-final winner, Ukraine originally qualified for the World Cup. However, on 6 July, it was announced that the Ukrainian Association of Football had refused to sanction the participation of the team at the World Cup. It was reported that the decision was made as part of a wider sporting boycott of Russia by Ukrainian authorities due to ongoing tensions between the two states. As the next best-placed team in the qualifiers, Switzerland were chosen to replace Ukraine at the World Cup.)	5th	6	4	1	1	32	30	+2
(United Arab Emirates) 2023	did not qualify									Ongoing								
(Seychelles) 2025	to be determined									To be determined								
Total	0 titles	6/11	28	14	3	10	150	127	+23	0 titles	8/8	52	36	3	13	306	187	+119

== Honours ==
- 2005 Euro Beach Soccer Cup winner
- 2009 FIFA Beach Soccer World Cup runners-up
- 2011 Euro Beach Soccer League Superfinal runners-up
- 2012 Euro Beach Soccer League Superfinal winner
