= 2006 Euro Beach Soccer League =

Tournament details
- Dates: 2 June – 27 August
- Teams: 14 (from 1 confederation)
- Venue(s): 10 (in 10 host cities)

Final positions
- Champions: Spain (5th title)
- Runners-up: Portugal
- Third place: Poland
- Fourth place: Italy

Tournament statistics
- Matches played: 91
- Goals scored: 708 (7.78 per match)
- Top scorer(s): (Portugal) Madjer
- Best player(s): (Portugal) Madjer
- Best goalkeeper: (Spain) Roberto Valeiro

The 2006 Euro Beach Soccer League, was the ninth edition of the Euro Beach Soccer League (EBSL), the premier beach soccer competition contested between European men's national teams, occurring annually since its establishment in 1998. The league was organised by Beach Soccer Worldwide (BSWW) between June 2 and August 27, 2006, in eight different nations across Europe.

This season saw the introduction of a number of changes. This included having Division B nations compete first, attempting to qualify to play in Division A later in the season. Division A also underwent organisational rearrangements – each stage was now played as a knockout tournament involving all eight nations.

Italy entered the tournament as defending champions but lost to Spain in the Superfinal semi-finals. The Spanish proceeded to win the title, beating Portugal in the final to claim their fifth and most recent European crown to date, having last won in 2003, and the last time they reach the final until 2014.

The league also doubled as the qualification process for the 2006 FIFA Beach Soccer World Cup. The nations finishing in first, second, third and fourth place qualified, along with the winners of the last chance bracket.

== Format changes ==
The 2006 season featured many changes compared to the preceding years of 2002–2005.

=== Division B ===
- Division B nations could no longer directly qualify for the Superfinal.
- The Division B regular season would no longer take place at the same time as the Division A regular season.
- The nations of the division would now start and finish all of their division's scheduled fixtures of the regular season before Division A even began.
- Instead of qualifying for the Superfinal, the top four ranking teams would now qualify to play in the Division A regular season which would commence later in the year.

=== Division A ===
- Eight teams take part in Division A; four qualifiers from Division B (as described above) and four automatic entrants (France, Spain, Italy, Portugal)
- Each stage would no longer be staged as a four team, round robin event.
- Instead, all eight teams would take part in a straight knockout tournament.
- Points for the league table were to be earned based on the nation's final placement in each stage, rather than on match wins.

== Division B ==
The Division B season began and ended before Division A began.

The division consisted of five rounds of fixtures known as stages, with one stage hosted in Austria, Greece, Russia, Poland and the Netherlands. Four teams took part in each stage, with each team scheduled to take part in two of the five stages. In every round of fixtures the teams played each other in a round robin format. The nation that earned the most points at the end of the stage was crowned stage winners.

At the end of the five stages, an interim league table was drawn up with the top teams advancing to the final round of Division B.

=== Teams ===
Ten teams took part in Division B, aiming to claim one of the four qualification spots into Division A later in the year.

- Austria
- Belgium
- England
- Germany
- Greece
- Netherlands
- Poland
- Russia
- Switzerland
- Ukraine

=== Stage 1 ===
The first stage took place in Linz, Austria.

Pos	Team	Pld	W	W+	L	GF	GA	GD	Pts
1	Switzerland	3	3	0	0	18	8	+10	9
2	Poland	3	2	0	1	11	10	+1	6
3	Belgium	3	1	0	2	11	17	–6	3
4	Austria	3	0	0	3	9	14	–5	0

Awards
Best player: (Switzerland) Stephan Meier
Top scorer(s): (Poland) Marek Zuk (6 goals)
Best goalkeeper: (Switzerland) Nico Jung

Results
2 June 2006	Austria	3–4	Belgium
2 June 2006	Switzerland	4–1	Poland
3 June 2006	Austria	4–5	Switzerland
3 June 2006	Poland	5–4	Belgium
4 June 2006	Austria	2–5	Poland
4 June 2006	Switzerland	9–3	Belgium

=== Stage 2 ===
The second stage took place in Poddębice, Poland.

Pos	Team	Pld	W	W+	L	GF	GA	GD	Pts
1	Ukraine	3	2	0	1	14	10	+4	6
2	Poland	3	1	1	1	17	8	+9	5
3	Greece	3	1	0	2	14	23	–9	3
4	England	3	0	1	2	11	15	–4	2

Awards
Best player: (Poland) Witold Ziober
Top scorer(s): (Ukraine) Oleg Mozgovoyy (7 goals)
Best goalkeeper: (Ukraine) Vladyslav Lysenko

Results
9 June 2006	Poland	11–2	Greece
9 June 2006	Ukraine	4–3	England
10 June 2006	Greece	8–4	England
10 June 2006	Poland	3–2 (a.e.t.)	Ukraine
11 June 2006	Poland	3–4 (a.e.t.)	England
11 June 2006	Ukraine	8–4	Greece

=== Stage 3 ===
The third stage took place in Athens, Greece.

Pos	Team	Pld	W	W+	L	GF	GA	GD	Pts
1	Netherlands	2	2	0	0	9	6	+3	6
2	England	2	0	1	1	4	5	–1	2
3	Greece	2	0	0	2	6	8	–2	0
	Russia	Disqualified^{1}							

† – Result voided^{1}

Awards
Best player: (Russia) Andrey Smirnov
Top scorer(s): (Greece) Dimitris Saravakos (6 goals)
Best goalkeeper: (Netherlands) Edwin Vonk

Results
16 June 2006	Greece	2–2 (a.e.t.); 0–1 (pens.)	England
16 June 2006	Russia	3–2^{†}	Netherlands
17 June 2006	Greece	4–6	Netherlands
17 June 2006	Russia	4–1^{†}	England
18 June 2006	Greece	5–5 (a.e.t.); 2–3 (pens.)^{†}	Russia
18 June 2006	Netherlands	3–2	England

=== Stage 4 ===
The fourth stage was due to take place in Anapa, Russia, between June 23 and 25, 2006, involving Russia, Ukraine, Austria and Germany, but was cancelled due to a dispute between the Russian national team and the Russian Football Union (RFU).

The RFU claimed they had not given the Russian national team permission to play as official representatives of Russia during stage 3 in Athens. FIFA required that all teams participating in World Cup qualification tournaments must gain explicit permission of their nation's football association to represent their country in said competitions. Since the Russian national team did not gain permission from the RFU, the RFU filed the issue with FIFA in order to have the results of the games involving the Russian team in stage 3 annulled. Due to the ongoing dispute, BSWW were forced to cancel the fourth stage involving and to be hosted in Russia.

The complaints by the RFU to FIFA ultimately saw the results of the Russian team in stage 3 voided and the team was disqualified from competing any further in this year's EBSL.

=== Stage 5 ===
The fifth stage took place in Scheveningen, the Netherlands.

Pos	Team	Pld	W	W+	L	GF	GA	GD	Pts
1	Switzerland	3	2	0	1	14	5	+9	6
2	Netherlands	3	1	1	1	14	16	–2	5
3	Belgium	3	1	1	1	11	11	0	5
4	Germany	3	0	0	3	5	12	–7	0

Awards
Best player: (Switzerland) Stephan Meier
Top scorer(s): (Netherlands) Berry Powel (5 goals)
Best goalkeeper: (Switzerland) Nico Jung

Results
30 June 2006	Netherlands	7–6 (a.e.t.)	Belgium
30 June 2006	Switzerland	5–0	Germany
1 July 2006	Belgium	2–1	Germany
1 July 2006	Netherlands	2–6	Switzerland
2 July 2006	Belgium	3–3 (a.e.t.); 1–0 (pens.)	Switzerland
2 July 2006	Netherlands	5–4	Germany

=== Interim standings ===
Following the completion of the stages, the Division B league table was drawn up. The top eight teams qualified for the final round of Division B.

Due to the cancellation of one stage, and the results of another partially annulled, many of the nations played different numbers of total matches. Therefore, their final positions were based on points per game instead of total points.

Pos	Team	Pld	W	W+	L	GF	GA	GD	Pts	PPG	Qualification
1	Switzerland	6	5	0	1	32	13	+19	15	2.5	Advance to final round
2	Netherlands	5	3	1	1	23	22	+1	11	2.2	Advance to final round
3	Ukraine	3	2	0	1	14	10	+4	6	2.0	Advance to final round
4	Poland	6	3	1	2	28	18	+10	11	1.8	Advance to final round
5	Belgium	6	2	1	3	22	28	–6	8	1.3	Advance to final round
6	England	5	0	2	3	15	20	–5	4	0.8	Advance to final round
7	Greece	5	1	0	4	20	31	–11	3	0.6	Advance to final round
8	Austria	3	0	0	3	9	14	–5	0	0	Advance to final round
9	Germany	3	0	0	3	5	12	–7	0	0	
	Russia	Disqualified, results voided^{1}									

=== Final round ===
The final round of Division B directly determined the four teams that would qualify to Division A. It took place in Sankt Pölten, Austria.

==== Format ====
The tournament was staged as an unconventional double elimination tournament as explained below:

- All teams started in the quarter finals. The teams were seeded based on their interim standings, with the number 1 seed drawn against number 8, number 2 against number 7 and so on.
- The winners of the quarter finals proceeded to the winners' semi finals, whilst the losers of the quarter finals receded to the losers' semi finals.
- The winners of the winners' semi finals moved on to the final to contest 1st and 2nd place.
- The winners of the losers' semi finals moved on to the 3rd–6th place finals to contest said places.
- The losers of the winners' semi finals receded into the 3rd–6th place finals to also contest said places, against the winners of the losers' semi finals.
- The winners of the 3rd–6th place finals claimed 3rd and 4th place – the final two spots to secure a place in Division A.
- The losers of the 3rd–6th place finals claimed 5th and 6th place.
- The losers of the losers semi finals played a consolation match to determine 7th and 8th place.

==== Results ====
14 July	Quarter finals (QF)		
14 July	Netherlands	4–3	Greece
14 July	Ukraine	7–3	England
14 July	Austria	3–2	Switzerland
14 July	Poland	12–4	Belgium

15 July	QF Winners ↓			QF Losers ↓		
15 July	Winners' semi finals (WSF)			Losers' semi finals (LSF)		
15 July	Ukraine	3–1	Netherlands	Greece	6–4	England
15 July	Poland	9–3	Austria	Switzerland	4–0	Belgium

16 July	WSF Winners ↓			WSF Losers ↓		LSF Winners ↓	LSF Losers ↓		
16 July	Final			3rd–6th place deciding matches			7th & 8th place match		
16 July	Poland	10–5	Ukraine	Netherlands	0–3	Switzerland	England	6–2	Belgium
16 July	Poland	10–5	Ukraine	Austria	5–10	Greece	England	6–2	Belgium

Awards
Best player: (Poland) Marek Zuk
Top scorer(s): (Poland) Bogusław Saganowski (9 goals)
Best goalkeeper: (Switzerland) Nico Jung

=== Final Division B standings ===
Rank	Team	Qualification
1st place, gold medalist(s)	Poland	Advance to Division A
2nd place, silver medalist(s)	Ukraine	Advance to Division A
3rd place, bronze medalist(s)	Switzerland	Advance to Division A
4	Greece	Advance to Division A
5	Netherlands	
6	Austria	
7	England	
8	Belgium	
9	Germany	
	Russia	

== Division A ==
Following the completion of Division B, Division A commenced.

Division A consisted of four rounds of fixtures known as stages, with one stage hosted in each of the four nations which received automatic entry into the division. All eight teams took part in each stage.

Each stage was played as a straight knockout tournament. All eight teams contesting the stage title started in the quarter-finals, playing one match per round until the final when the winner of the stage was crowned. The losers of the quarter and semi-finals played in consolation matches to determine their final league placements.

=== Point distribution ===
Unlike in previous years, points earned by the participating teams for winning matches did not count towards league table. Instead, teams earned points for the league table based on their final placement in each stage from 12 points for winning the stage, down to 1 point for finishing last.

The breakdown of the distribution of points is shown in the table below:

Rank	Pts	Rank	Pts
1st	12 pts.	5th	4 pts.
2nd	10 pts.	6th	3 pts.
3rd	8 pts.	7th	2 pts.
4th	6 pts.	8th	1 pt.

=== Teams ===
==== Automatic entrants ====
- France
- Italy
- Portugal
- Spain

==== Division B qualifiers ====
- Greece
- Poland
- Switzerland
- Ukraine

=== Stage 1 ===
The first stage of Division A took place in San Benedetto del Tronto, Italy.

- Dates: QFs – 24 July; SFs – 25 July; Finals – 26 July

==== Results ====
Fifth place
France	5
Spain	3
7th place match
Greece	1
Poland	5

5th–8th place semifinals
Greece	2
France	5
Poland	1
Spain	4

Quarterfinals
Italy (p)	3 (1)
Greece	3 (0)
France	3 (2)
Switzerland (p)	3 (3)
Portugal	9
Poland	2
Ukraine	3
Spain	2

Semifinals
Italy (p)	4 (2)
Switzerland	4 (1)
Portugal	1
Ukraine (a.e.t.)	2

Final
Italy	2
Ukraine	0
Third place
Switzerland	1
Portugal	4

==== Awards ====
Award	Player
Best player	(Italy) Pasquale Carotenuto
Top scorer(s)	(Switzerland) Stephan Meier (7 goals)
Best goalkeeper	(Switzerland) Nico Jung

==== Final standings ====
Rank	Team	Points earned
1st place, gold medalist(s)	Italy	12
2nd place, silver medalist(s)	Ukraine	10
3rd place, bronze medalist(s)	Portugal	8
4	Switzerland	6
5	France	4
6	Spain	3
7	Poland	2
8	Greece	1

=== Stage 2 ===
The second stage of Division A took place in Tignes, France.

- Dates: QFs – 28 July; SFs – 29 July; Finals – 30 July

==== Results ====
Fifth place
France	3
Portugal	2
7th place match
Switzerland	6
Italy	4

5th–8th place semifinals
France	6
Switzerland	3
Portugal	7
Italy	5

Quarterfinals
France	3 (0)
Greece (p)	3 (1)
Switzerland	5
Spain	6
Portugal	5
Ukraine	6
Poland	6
Italy	3

Semifinals
Greece	3
Spain	7
Ukraine	2
Poland	5

Final
Spain	5 (1)
Poland (p)	5 (2)
Third place
Greece (a.e.t.)	3
Ukraine	2

==== Awards ====
Award	Player
Best player	(Spain) Amarelle
Top scorer(s)	(Spain) Amarelle (9 goals)
Best goalkeeper	(Greece) Ilias Atmatsidis

==== Final standings ====
Rank	Team	Points earned
1st place, gold medalist(s)	Poland	12
2nd place, silver medalist(s)	Spain	10
3rd place, bronze medalist(s)	Greece	8
4	Ukraine	6
5	France	4
6	Portugal	3
7	Switzerland	2
8	Italy	1

=== Stage 3 ===
The third stage of Division A took place in Palma de Mallorca, Mallorca, Spain.

- Dates: QFs – 4 August; SFs – 5 August; Finals – 6 August

==== Results ====
Fifth place
Poland	2
Ukraine	4
7th place match
Switzerland	3 (0)
Greece (p)	3 (1)

5th–8th place semifinals
Switzerland	4
Poland	9
Ukraine	5
Greece	2

Quarterfinals
Portugal	7
Switzerland	3
France (a.e.t.)	6
Poland	5
Ukraine	5 (2)
Italy (p)	5 (3)
Greece	2
Spain	4

Semifinals
Portugal	2
France	1
Italy	2
Spain	3

Final
Portugal	2
Spain	3
Third place
France	4
Italy	3

==== Awards ====
Award	Player
Best player	(Poland) Bogusław Saganowski
Top scorer(s)	(Portugal) Madjer (7 goals)
Best goalkeeper	(Spain) Roberto Valeiro

==== Final standings ====
Rank	Team	Points earned
1st place, gold medalist(s)	Spain	12
2nd place, silver medalist(s)	Portugal	10
3rd place, bronze medalist(s)	France	8
4	Italy	6
5	Ukraine	4
6	Poland	3
7	Greece	2
8	Switzerland	1

=== Stage 4 ===
The fourth and final stage of Division A took place in Portimão, Portugal.

- Dates: QFs – 17 August; SFs – 18 August; Finals – 19 August

==== Results ====
Fifth place
France	3
Spain	8
7th place match
Greece	2
Switzerland	6

5th–8th place semifinals
Greece	2
France	5
Spain	6
Switzerland	2

Quarterfinals
Portugal	5
Greece	1
France	1
Ukraine	3
Spain	1
Poland	2
Italy	3
Switzerland	1

Semifinals
Portugal	5
Ukraine	1
Poland	3
Italy	6

Final
Portugal	3
Italy	2
Third place
Ukraine	8
Poland	6

==== Awards ====
Award	Player
Best player	(Portugal) Madjer
Top scorer(s)	(Italy) Pasquale Carotenuto, (Portugal) Madjer (7 goals)
Best goalkeeper	(Portugal) João Rodrigues

==== Final standings ====
Rank	Team	Points earned
1st place, gold medalist(s)	Portugal	12
2nd place, silver medalist(s)	Italy	10
3rd place, bronze medalist(s)	Ukraine	8
4	Poland	6
5	Spain	4
6	France	3
7	Switzerland	2
8	Greece	1

=== Final table ===
Following the completion of all four stages, the final Division A table was drawn up. The top six nations qualified for the Superfinal.

Pos	Match stats									Points earned per stage				Total points	Qualification
Pos	Team	Pld	W	W+	L	GF	GA	GD	Pts	Stage 1	Stage 2	Stage 3	Stage 4	Total points	Qualification
1	Portugal	12	8	0	4	52	30	+22	24	8	3	10	12	33	Advance to Superfinal
2	Spain	12	8	0	4	52	35	+17	24	3	10	12	4	29	Advance to Superfinal
3	Italy	12	3	3	6	42	45	–3	15	12	1	6	10	29	Advance to Superfinal
4	Ukraine	12	6	1	5	41	39	+2	20	10	6	4	8	28	Advance to Superfinal
5	Poland	12	5	1	6	51	53	–2	17	2	12	3	6	23	Advance to Superfinal
6	France	12	7	0	5	45	39	+6	21	4	4	8	3	19	Advance to Superfinal
7	Greece	12	0	3	9	27	53	–26	6	1	8	2	1	12	
8	Switzerland	12	2	1	9	41	57	–16	8	6	2	1	2	11	

== Superfinal ==
The Superfinal took place at the Plages du Prado, Marseille, France.

For the first time, the Superfinal was not played as a knockout tournament. Instead, the Superfinal was organised as a multi-stage tournament; starting with a group stage, the six qualified nations were split into two groups of three, playing in a round robin format. The top two from each group advanced to the semi-finals from which point on the Superfinal was played as a knockout tournament until the winner of the 2006 EBSL was crowned, with an additional match to determine third place.

The semifinalists secured qualification to the 2006 FIFA Beach Soccer World Cup.

=== Group stage ===
Key: Advance to the knockout stage

==== Group A ====
Pos	Team	Pld	W	W+	L	GF	GA	GD	Pts
1	Portugal	2	1	1	0	9	7	+2	5
2	Italy	2	1	0	1	12	11	+1	3
3	France	2	0	0	2	6	9	−3	0

Results
22 August 2006	Portugal	6–6 (a.e.t.); 1–0 (pens.)	Italy
23 August 2006	France	5–6	Italy
24 August 2006	France	1–3	Portugal

==== Group B ====
Pos	Team	Pld	W	W+	L	GF	GA	GD	Pts
1	Spain	2	2	0	0	10	7	+3	6
2	Poland	2	0	1	1	7	8	−1	2
3	Ukraine	2	0	0	2	7	9	−2	0

Results
22 August 2006	Spain	5–4	Ukraine
23 August 2006	Ukraine	3–4 (a.e.t.)	Poland
24 August 2006	Spain	5–3	Poland

=== Knockout stage ===
Semi-finals
26 August 2006
Portugal	8
Poland	3
26 August 2006
Spain	5
Italy	3

Final
27 August 2006
Portugal	2
Spain	4
Third place
27 August 2006
Poland (p)	2 (2)
Italy	2 (1)

==== Semi-finals ====
26 August 2006

Portugal	8–3	Poland
Madjer; Alan; Hernâni; Barraca	Report	Żuk; Saganowski; Polakowski

Plages du Prado, Marseille
26 August 2006

Spain	5–3	Italy
Amarelle; Nico; Javi	Report	Pasquali; Feudi

Plages du Prado, Marseille

==== Third place play-off ====
27 August 2006

Poland	2–2 (a.e.t.)	Italy
Kuhciak	Report	Pasquali; Tresoldi
Penalties
Wydmuszek (penalty scored); Polakowski (penalty scored)	2–1	(penalty scored) Pasquali; (penalty missed) Tresoldi

Plages du Prado, Marseille

==== Final ====
27 August 2006

Portugal	2–4	Spain
Madjer	Report	Amarelle; Nico

Plages du Prado, Marseille

2006 Euro Beach Soccer League
champions

Spain
Fifth title

Statistics
Top scorer(s): (Spain) Amarelle (8 goals)

=== Superfinal final standings ===
Pos	Team	Notes	Qualification
1	Spain	EBSL Champions	Qualified to 2006 FIFA Beach Soccer World Cup
2	Portugal	Runners-up	Qualified to 2006 FIFA Beach Soccer World Cup
3	Poland	Third place	Qualified to 2006 FIFA Beach Soccer World Cup
4	Italy		Qualified to 2006 FIFA Beach Soccer World Cup
5	Ukraine		
6	France		

== Last chance bracket ==
European nations were granted five berths at the 2006 FIFA Beach Soccer World Cup. As Superfinal semifinalists, Portugal, Spain, Poland and Italy successfully claimed four of these spots. This meant one berth was yet to be filled. This berth was contested in a final round of the 2006 EBSL, independent from the normal proceedings of the league, known as the Last chance bracket. Played as a knockout tournament, parallel to the staging of the Superfinal, France won the event and claimed the final World Cup spot.

== Sources ==
- Roonba
- RSSSF
