= 2006 Euro Beach Soccer League – Last chance bracket =

EBSL Last Chance Bracket
Tournament details
- Dates: 24 August – 27 August
- Teams: 12 (from 1 confederation)

Final positions
- Champions: France
- Runners-up: Switzerland

Tournament statistics
- Matches played: 13
- Goals scored: 103 (7.92 per match)

The 2006 Euro Beach Soccer League – Last chance bracket, simply known as the Last chance bracket was an additional round of the 2006 Euro Beach Soccer League (EBSL) that was specially organised to determine the fifth and final European nation that would qualify for the 2006 FIFA Beach Soccer World Cup.

The event was organised by Beach Soccer Worldwide (BSWW), in parallel with the staging of the 2006 EBSL Superfinal, taking place during the same dates (24–27 August) and in the same location of Marseille, France.

Five berths were allocated to European teams in the 2006 FIFA Beach Soccer World Cup, four of which were filled when Portugal, Spain, Italy and Poland reached the semi-finals of the Superfinal. This meant there was still one final berth at the World Cup to be filled. In order to decide which nation would get this fifth and final spot at the World Cup, BSWW decided the prospective nations would compete in a knockout tournament called the Last chance bracket, with the winner claiming the final World Cup ticket.

France won the event by beating Switzerland in the final and claimed the last remaining World Cup berth.

== Teams ==
This round of the 2006 EBSL was a distinctly separate and unique event from the regular structure of the league, but nevertheless related to the league since it involved inviting back all the teams previously knocked out of World Cup qualifying contention during this year's EBSL to compete in the event for a second chance at qualification, as well as four wild-card entries, as listed below.

From Division B

These nations finished in 5th through 9th in Division B, failing to qualify for Division A

- Belgium
- Germany
- England
- Netherlands

From Division A

These nations finished in 7th and 8th place in Division A, failing to qualify for the Superfinal

- Greece
- Switzerland

From the Superfinal

These nations finished in 5th and 6th in the Superfinal

- France
- Ukraine

Wild-cards

These nations had not yet competed in this year's EBSL until this point (bar Russia)

- Czech Republic
- Hungary
- Montenegro
- Russia^{1}

1. Russia initially competed in Division B, but were disqualified from competing any further mid-season.

== Results ==
The success of teams in this season's EBSL also affected what round the nations began their last chance bracket campaign's in as follows:

- With the least credentials, the four wild cards and four Division B teams who failed to qualify into Division A, were drawn against each other and started in the first round.
- With the most credentials, the two Division A nations who failed to make the Superfinal, and the two who were knocked out in the group stage of the Superfinal, received a bye in the first round, and entered straight into the quarter-finals

=== Main bracket ===
First round
DB9	Germany	2
WC	Hungary	4
DB8	Belgium	6
WC	Czech Republic	5
DB5	Netherlands	4
WC	Montenegro	5
DB7	England	w/o
WC	Russia

Quarter-finals
B3	Ukraine	4
WC	Hungary	3
DA8	Switzerland	5
DB8	Belgium	4
DA7	Greece	4
WC	Montenegro	10
A3	France	8
DB7	England	6

Semi-finals
B3	Ukraine	0
DA8	Switzerland	4
WC	Montenegro	3
A3	France	6

Final
A3	France	5
DA8	Switzerland	1

=== Consolation matches ===
5th–8th place consolation matches
DA7	Greece	0
DB7	England	4
WC	Hungary	6
DB8	Belgium	4

Key:

A3 This team finished 3rd in group A of the group stage of the Superfinal
B3 This team finished 3rd in group B of the group stage of the Superfinal
DB stands for Division B, followed by their numerical final table position
DA stands for Division A, followed by their numerical final table position
WC indicates a wild-card entry (these teams had not competed in the 2006 EBSL until this point)
w/o Russia withdrew from the competition, therefore England had a walkover into the quarter-finals

=== Final standings ===
Rank	Team	Notes
1st place, gold medalist(s)	France	Qualified to 2006 FIFA Beach Soccer World Cup
2nd place, silver medalist(s)	Switzerland	
3rd place, bronze medalist(s)	Ukraine	
4	Montenegro	
5	Hungary	
6	England	
7	Belgium	
8	Greece	
9	Germany	
10	Czech Republic	
11	Netherlands	
12	Russia	

== World Cup qualifiers ==
The following table shows the five nations qualified to the 2006 World Cup and their qualification route.

№	Nation	Qualification route
1	Spain	Superfinal semifinalists
2	Portugal	Superfinal semifinalists
3	Poland	Superfinal semifinalists
4	Italy	Superfinal semifinalists
5	France	Last chance bracket Winners

== Sources ==
- Roonba
- RSSSF
