= Madjer =

Portuguese beach soccer player

Personal information
- Full name: João Victor Saraiva
- Date of birth: 22 January 1977 (age 49)
- Place of birth: Luanda, Angola
- Height: 1.94 m (6 ft 4 1/2 in)
- Position: Forward

Senior career*
Years	Team	Apps	(Gls)
2002–2007	Cavalieri del Mare		
2003	Pernambuco		
2008	Milano Beach Soccer		
2008	Rio de Janeiro		
2009	Cavalieri del Mare		
2010–2012	Sporting CP		
2010	São Paulo		
2010	AS Roma		
2010	Torres Novas		
2010	Lokomotiv Moscow		
2011	Alanyaspor		
2011	Al-Ahli Dubai		
2012	Botafogo		
2012–2013	Beşiktaş		
2013–2014	Lokomotiv Moscow		
2014–2019	Sporting CP		

International career^{‡}
1998–2019	Portugal	587	(1082)
Medal record
Representing Portugal
Men's Beach Soccer
European Games
Gold medal – first place	2019 Minsk
Bronze medal – third place	2015 Baku
FIFA Beach Soccer World Cup
Silver medal – second place	2005 Brazil
Bronze medal – third place	2008 France
Bronze medal – third place	2009 UAE
Bronze medal – third place	2011 Italy
Gold medal – first place	2015 Portugal
Gold medal – first place	2019 Paraguay
Euro Beach Soccer League
Bronze medal – third place	1998
Bronze medal – third place	1999
Silver medal – second place	2000
Silver medal – second place	2001
Gold medal – first place	2002
Bronze medal – third place	2003
Silver medal – second place	2004
Silver medal – second place	2005
Silver medal – second place	2006
Gold medal – first place	2007
Gold medal – first place	2008
Silver medal – second place	2009
Gold medal – first place	2010
Bronze medal – third place	2011
Silver medal – second place	2013
Bronze medal – third place	2014
Gold medal – first place	2015
Euro Beach Soccer Cup
Gold medal – first place	1998
Silver medal – second place	1999
Gold medal – first place	2001
Gold medal – first place	2002
Gold medal – first place	2003
Gold medal – first place	2004
Bronze medal – third place	2005
Gold medal – first place	2006
Bronze medal – third place	2007
Bronze medal – third place	2009
Silver medal – second place	2010
Silver medal – second place	2012
- * Club domestic league appearances and goals as of 21 July 2015 ‡ National team caps and goals as of 24 December 2019

João Victor Saraiva (born 22 January 1977), better known as Madjer, is a Portuguese retired beach soccer player. He played in the forward position, and has won numerous awards at the FIFA Beach Soccer World Cups for his goalscoring abilities. He took the nickname Madjer because his idol is the former Algerian player Rabah Madjer. He has often been hailed as the best-ever beach soccer player. He became the first player to score 1000 international beach soccer career goals in an 8–1 win against England in September 2016.

In 2019, he was considered, by the prestigious magazine France Football, to be the best beach soccer player of all time.

== Early life and background ==
Madjer was born in Luanda, Angola, but moved to Portugal at a young age. He began his football career in conventional 11-a-side football and futsal before fully transitioning to beach soccer in the late 1990s. His acrobatic style, combining height (1.94 m) with exceptional agility, volley technique, overhead kicks, and bicycle kicks, quickly made him one of the most recognisable figures in the sport.

== International career ==
Madjer has an agility and dribbling talent in contrast to his height (194 cm). He is capable of acrobatic finishes such as volleys, over-head kicks and bicycle kicks. His skills contribute to competition in EBSL, Mundialito, and above all the Beach Soccer World Championship.

At the 2005, 2006, and 2008 World Cups Madjer won the golden boot for most goals scored in the tournament, and, he also was the MVP of EBSL last season in 1999, 2006, 2008 and 2009.

He retired from the sport after winning the 2019 FIFA Beach Soccer World Cup in a victory over Italy.

== Post-retirement ==
Following his retirement, Madjer was appointed beach soccer coordinator by the Portuguese Football Federation (FPF) in February 2020, where he has focused on youth development and the growth of the sport in Portugal. He also organises the annual Madjer Youth Beach Soccer Cup, an international youth tournament aimed at discovering and nurturing new talent.

== Statistics ==
Tournament	Year	Apps	Goals
Euro Beach Soccer League	1998	?	?
Euro Beach Soccer League	1999	?	?
Euro Beach Soccer League	2000	?	?
Euro Beach Soccer League	2001	11	40
Euro Beach Soccer League	2002	?	7
Euro Beach Soccer League	2003	14	34
Euro Beach Soccer League	2004	12	30
Euro Beach Soccer League	2005	14	31
Euro Beach Soccer League	2006	?	30
Euro Beach Soccer League	2007	16	23
Euro Beach Soccer League	2008	3	11
Euro Beach Soccer League	2009	9	20
Euro Beach Soccer League	2010	5	9
Euro Beach Soccer League	2011	9	7
Euro Beach Soccer League	2012	9	6
Euro Beach Soccer League	2013	3	1
Euro Beach Soccer League	2014	10	8
Euro Beach Soccer League	2015	7	3
Euro Beach Soccer League	2016	10	6
Euro Beach Soccer League	2017	10	9
Euro Beach Soccer League	2018	10	6
Euro Beach Soccer League	2019	7	1
Total		159+	282+

Tournament	Year	Apps	Goals
FIFA Beach Soccer World Cup	1998	?	15
FIFA Beach Soccer World Cup	1999	?	15
FIFA Beach Soccer World Cup	2000	?	15
FIFA Beach Soccer World Cup	2001	5	6
FIFA Beach Soccer World Cup	2002	5	9
FIFA Beach Soccer World Cup	2003	5	10
FIFA Beach Soccer World Cup	2004	5	12
FIFA Beach Soccer World Cup	2005	5	12
FIFA Beach Soccer World Cup	2006	6	21
FIFA Beach Soccer World Cup	2007	4	8
FIFA Beach Soccer World Cup	2008	6	13
FIFA Beach Soccer World Cup	2009	5	13
FIFA Beach Soccer World Cup	2011	6	12
FIFA Beach Soccer World Cup	2013	–	–
FIFA Beach Soccer World Cup	2015	6	8
FIFA Beach Soccer World Cup	2017	4	0
FIFA Beach Soccer World Cup	2019	6	1
Total		68+	140

== Honours ==
=== Club ===
Cavalieri del Mare Beach Soccer
- Scudetto: 2005

Sporting Clube de Portugal
- Circuito Nacional de Futebol de Praia: 2010, 2016

FC Lokomotiv Moscow
- Russian National Beach Soccer Championship: 2011;
- Euro Winners Cup: 2013

Alanya
- Turkish National Beach Soccer Championship: 2011

Al-Ahli Club

- UAE National Beach Soccer Championship: 2012, 2013, 2014. 2015
- UAE President's Cup: 2014
- UAE Supercup: 2014
- Instanbul Beach Soccer Cup: 2015
- Mundialito de Clubes: 2015 (3rd)
- Beach Soccer Championships (Oceanside) USA Cup: 2016

Beşiktaş J.K.
- Turkish National Beach Soccer Championship: 2013

=== Country ===
- FIFA Beach Soccer World Cup (3): 2001, 2015, 2019
- Euro Beach Soccer League (6): 2002, 2007, 2008, 2010, 2015, 2019
- Euro Beach Soccer Cup (6): 1998, 2001, 2002, 2003, 2004, 2006
- European Games (Gold Medal): 2019
- BSWW Mundialito (4): 2003, 2008, 2009, 2012
- Copa Latina (1): 2000

=== Individual ===
- FIFA Beach Soccer World Cup Golden Ball (2): 2005, 2006
- FIFA Beach Soccer World Cup Silver Ball (2): 2007, 2009
- FIFA Beach Soccer World Cup Bronze Ball (1): 2015
- Beach Soccer World Championships Top Scorer (2): 2002, 2004
- FIFA Beach Soccer World Cup Golden Shoe (3): 2005, 2006, 2008
- FIFA Beach Soccer World Cup Silver Shoe (3): 2009, 2011, 2015
- Beach Soccer MVP (3): 2003, 2005, 2006
- Beach Soccer Best Player of the Year (2): 2015, 2016
- Beach Soccer Goal of the Year (1): 2015
- Beach Soccer Team of the Year (2): 2015, 2016
- Euro Beach Soccer League MVP (5): 1999, 2006, 2008, 2009, 2010
- Euro Beach Soccer League Top Scorer (6): 2001, 2003, 2004, 2006, 2008, 2009
- Euro Beach Soccer League Fair Play Award (1): 2005
- Euro Beach Soccer League Portuguese Event Top Scorer (1): 2007
- Euro Beach Soccer League French Event Top Scorer (1): 2007
- Euro Beach Soccer League Spanish Event Top Scorer (1): 2004
- Euro Beach Soccer Cup Top Scorer (4): 2004, 2009, 2010, 2012
- FIFA Beach Soccer World Cup qualification (UEFA) Top Scorer (1): 2011
- Mundialito MVP (6): 2005, 2007, 2008, 2009, 2010, 2012
- Mundialito Top Scorer (5): 2004, 2005, 2008, 2010, 2012
- Copa Latina MVP (2): 1999, 2000
- Capocannoniere Serie A (2): 2008, 2009
- Capocannoniere Coppa Italia (1): 2008
- Russian National Beach Soccer Championship MVP (1): 2011
- Turkish National Beach Soccer Championship MVP (2): 2012, 2013
- UAE National Beach Soccer Championship Top Scorer (1): 2012
- Mundialito de Clubes Top Scorer (1): 2012
- Beach Soccer Championships (Oceanside) USA Cup MVP (1): 2016
