= Disney XD (United Kingdom and Ireland) =

British children's television channel (1996–2020)

- Final logo used from 1 February 2016 to 1 October 2020
- Country: United Kingdom
- Broadcast area: United Kingdom; Ireland
- Headquarters: Hammersmith, London

Programming
- Language: English
- Picture format: 1080i HDTV(downscaled to 16:9 576i for the SDTV feed)
- Timeshift service: Disney XD +1 (2009 – 30 April 2020)

Ownership
- Owner: The Walt Disney Company Limited; Disney Channels Worldwide (Walt Disney Direct-to-Consumer & International)
- Sister channels: Disney Channel (1995–2020); Disney Jr. (2000-2020; relaunched in 2025)

History
- Launched: 19 October 1996; 30 years ago
- Closed: 1 October 2020; 6 years ago
- Replaced by: Disney+ (most of its content)
- Former names: Fox Kids Network (1996–1998); Fox Kids (1998–2004); Jetix (2005–2009)

Disney XD, formerly the Fox Kids Network, Fox Kids and Jetix, was a British and Irish children's pay television channel that was operated in the UK and Ireland from 19 October 1996 to 1 October 2020. At the time of closure, it was owned and operated by The Walt Disney Company Limited, the EMEA arm of the Walt Disney Company.

It was launched on 19 October 1996 under an operation of a joint-venture between the Fox Entertainment Group subsidiary of News Corporation and Saban Entertainment (later BVS Entertainment) as the first television channel or programming block outside the United States to use the "Fox Kids" name before moving operations to the Euronext-operating Fox Kids Europe. The Walt Disney Company acquired Fox Kids Europe's parent company, Fox Family Worldwide (later ABC Family Worldwide), on 19 October 2001, rebranding Fox Kids Europe as Jetix Europe in 2004 and the channel as Jetix in January the following year. Disney acquired Jetix Europe in 2008, and the channel adopted the then-newly launched American channel of the same name in August 2009.

On 30 September 2020, the channel closed on all platforms alongside Disney Channel and Disney Junior with content and programming from these channels currently incubated and included in Disney+ following its launch in the region.

== History ==
=== Fox Kids ===
==== Pre-Launch ====
Logo used from 1998 to 2005

In November 1995, Fox Broadcasting Company announced a strategic partnership with Saban Entertainment to launch branded Fox Kids channels outside North America. This followed up with an attempt by Fox to acquire a 49% stake in TCC from owners Flextech in 1996, which in turn would allow for extra programs from Saban to be added, but this deal fell through in August, with Fox still planning to branch off and launch their own network.

On 27 September 1996, it was announced that the British version of the Fox Kids Network would launch on October 19. This announcement was made a week after Fox announced to spin off the US Fox Kids Network block into a joint venture with Saban, known as Fox Kids Worldwide. On 30 September, Viacom announced they may file a lawsuit against BSkyB, citifying that the launch of Fox Kids Network would breach their existing contract to operate Nickelodeon UK which prevented Sky from operating any rival children's networks to Nickelodeon. The reason being was that Sky was at the time, 40% owned by News Corporation. However, the Fox Kids Worldwide formation with Saban prevented this.

==== Launch ====
The channel launched as planned on 19 October 1996. Broadcasting between the hours of 6am to 7pm, it was the first Fox Kids channel to launch in Europe. It also became the second channel to launch under the Fox Kids name, only following the Australian version. Fox Kids time-shared originally with Sky 2 and later National Geographic Channel, before extending its hours to 10pm. Fox Kids consisted of live-action and animated comedy, drama, and action-adventure television shows for children of all ages, Fox Kids also programmed up to seven hours of advertisement-free educational series each week.

"Our tremendous success in the U.S. is a testament to the fact that Fox Kids' unique and innovative programming and branding formula appeals to children. The strong performance of Fox Kids and Saban International's series currently broadcast in the UK indicates both a tremendous interest in - and an exceptional opportunity for - our unique brand of children's entertainment. We have an opportunity to expose an entirely new audience to the excitement of Fox Kids Networks around the world." " The channel will be the exclusive, first-run home for many episodes of the most popular children's series from its U.S. channel, including "Goosebumps", the top-rated U.S. children's programme, "Casper", the No. 1 new animated series for kids in the U.S. and the long-running U.S. hit, "The X-Men". Fox Kids Network also will feature programmes from Saban's extensive library of international children's titles."

— Margaret Loesch, President, Fox Kids Networks Worldwide

In October 1997, Fox Kids Network debuted on cable television being added to Comcast, and on Comtel in March 1998. Both would eventually be purchased by NTL. On 5 October 1998, Fox Kids was added to Cable & Wireless, replacing TCC Nordic. On 1 September 1999, a one-hour timeshift service, Fox Kids +, launched on Sky Digital. In December 2000, the channel was added to NTL's digital cable platform.

In early 2001, Fox Kids claimed one million children watched the channel every week. Fox Kids also restructured its operations into two divisions, content and commercial. In June 2001, Fox Kids UK debuted their first in-house production, Living with Lionel.

==== Disney Acquisition ====
On 23 July 2001, The Walt Disney Company announced its intent to acquire Fox Family Worldwide from News Corporation and Saban Entertainment, which gave Disney 76% ownership of Fox Kids Europe which in turn included the British operations. The deal was closed in October 2001. Beforehand, Disney announced they would rebrand Fox Kids Europe, and in turn Fox Kids UK as a Disney-branded network, but this was eventually cancelled.

On 11 January 2002, it was announced that the channel would be added to Telewest's digital service on 15 February, airing at the same 6am–10pm broadcast hours as on other digital platforms. The service was already available on Telewest's analogue cable operations. The channel launched with its timeshift on the day. Shortly afterwards, Fox Kids +1 was launched on NTL.

In November 2003, Fox Kids began broadcasting 24 hours a day, seven days a week.

=== Jetix ===
==== Pre-Launch ====
On 8 January 2004, ABC Cable Networks Group, Fox Kids Europe and Fox Kids Latin America announced plans to rename its entire operations to Jetix, which implied action and adventure. In the United Kingdom, the transitioning to the Jetix brand began with an announcement on 25 March 2004, with Fox Kids UK announcing to launch a daily primetime block under the Jetix name beginning on 3 April, airing from 3pm to 7pm, The block introduced several new programmes to Fox Kids' lineup, including Sonic X and Shaman King.

In September 2004, a monthly Jetix Magazine was launched as part of the rebrand, produced under license by Future Publishing. The magazine covered a wide aspect of content including news, interviews, music, and sports. Ronnie Cook, managing director at JCP, added: "We're excited to be able to offer this new UK title for kids. The Jetix Magazine will also provide viewers with a crucial marketing tool for upcoming channel activity."

In September 2004, the Jetix block became part of the morning line-up, between the hours of 7am to 9am.

==== Full rebranding ====
On 1 January 2005, Fox Kids was fully relaunched as Jetix. Cinema advertising campaign produced in-house was instigated to help promote the rebrand, Jetix marketing director Allan Stenhouse said: "Cinema is a fast-paced, action-packed environment where both the quality of visual and audio communication enables us to excite children about Jetix." Shortly after the rebranding, a new early-evening block was introduced named "Jetix Max". The Jetix Max slot included such shows as W.I.T.C.H., Totally Spies, Martin Mystery, Funky Cops, Power Rangers, PXG, and Black Hole High. Jetix Max was discontinued on 1 June 2006, although it remained on other Jetix channels around Europe.

On 26 September 2007, Jetix signed a deal with Sky and Virgin to allow its content to be used on their video on demand services. Jetix and Nordic managing director Boel Ferguson said, "We are excited about securing these deals and continue to pursue distribution opportunities to make Jetix programming even more accessible to consumers". Further enhancement occurred on 20 November 2007, when its online website started to include video clips of its programmes.

=== Disney XD ===
==== Pre-Launch ====
Logo used from 2009 to 2016

On 28 December 2008, Disney acquired the remaining 26% share in Jetix Europe and gained full ownership of the company. Disney relaunched Jetix as Disney XD, in the United States, followed by relaunch in the UK in August 2009, replacing Jetix. That same month, Jetix's on-screen logo was removed and replaced with Disney XD's logo counting down the days to the launch. Disney XD was aimed towards boys aged 6 to 14 with Disney Channel focusing more toward girls.

Disney XD eventually expanded to include live-action films and sports coverage developed in collaboration with ESPN and also introduced Aaron Stone, Phineas and Ferb and The Suite Life of Zack & Cody, and continued to air shows that previously aired on Jetix, such as Pokémon: Diamond and Pearl: Battle Dimension, Jimmy Two-Shoes, Kid vs. Kat, American Dragon: Jake Long and Phil of the Future.

==== Closure ====
The one-hour timeshift channel, Disney XD +1, was closed on 30 April 2020. Its Sky EPG slot was given to BabyTV.

Disney XD, along with its sister channels Disney Channel and Disney Junior, would officially close in the UK on 1 October 2020, after almost 24 years on-air, due to Disney failing to reach a new carriage deal with Sky and Virgin Media. The channel's content was transferred exclusively to Disney+. The final program to air its new content on the channel was Amphibia, with the final program to be broadcast on the day of its shut down was "Wonders of the Deep", an episode of the short-form animated series, Mickey Mouse. It then showed promos (the final promo being one for Big City Greens) before the channel froze for a few seconds, cutting into the channel's ident image and before it was closed.

The channels were removed from Virgin Media a day before the closure.

On 9 February 2023, Sky Kids took its former 707 slot on Virgin Media.

== Sky channel moves ==
On 1 February 2011, Disney XD swapped channel numbers with the HD version.

On 28 March 2013, Disney XD moved from 633 to 622.

As part of Sky's major EPG reshuffle on 1 May 2018, Disney XD HD moved 607 to 611 on Sky, Disney XD +1 moved 608 to 612 on Sky, Disney XD moved 622 to 645 on Sky.

On 30 April 2020, Disney XD +1 closed down from 612 on Sky.

On 1 October 2020, Disney XD HD closed down from 611 on Sky.

On 1 October 2020, Disney XD closed down from 645 on Sky.

== Pop-up channels ==
During 2017 and 2018, the now defunct timeshift channel of Disney XD occasionally was replaced by pop-up temporary channels which lasted a month.

- Spider-Man: On 16 July 2017, the channel was known as "Spider-Man Channel".
- Mickey and Pals: On 4 September 2017, the channel was temporarily rebranded as "Mickey and Pals", which aired various programming from Disney Junior.
- Avengers: On 1 April 2018, the channel was temporarily rebranded as Avengers channel, airing non-stop Avengers Assemble throughout the month as well as exclusive content to promote the release of Avengers: Infinity War. It reverted on 30 April 2018.

== Disney XD HD ==
Disney XD HD, a high-definition simulcast of Disney XD, launched on Sky channel 633 on 18 October 2010 in the UK. The channel broadcasts HD versions of Disney XD's live-action shows and animated programmes, such as Phineas and Ferb, I'm in the Band, Kick Buttowski: Suburban Daredevil and Zeke and Luther. This marks Sky's fiftieth HD channel, meeting Sky's HD channel target of 50 HD channels by Christmas 2010.

== Launch events ==
Disney XD was launched with a large campaign. Four launch initiatives were designed to introduce Disney XD to children in the UK:

=== Beach Soccer ===
In May 2009, Beach Soccer was a joint initiative between England Beach Soccer and Disney XD, holding Beach Soccer Roadshows across central and Southern England. An artificial beach was built in each of the five locations: Portsmouth, Nottingham, Minehead, Hyde, (Greater Manchester) culminating in a Beach Soccer final on Oxford Street, London on 29 August 2009. In June 2012, the event came to Sunderland.

=== Dance with Diversity ===
Britain's Got Talent winners Diversity helped to launch Disney XD by accepting a challenge to teach 100 young street dancers a one-off routine in a few days and then perform it in front of the crowds in Covent Garden. Disney XD set the challenge to Diversity to help inspire children to learn new activities. The challenge was documented in the programme Disney XD Challenge: Diversity, which aired on Disney XD on 10 September 2009.

=== Skate Britain ===
British skateboarder, Pete King, skated his way across the UK to help children get out and skateboarding as part of the launch of Disney XD.

From Land's End to John O'Groats, Pete King conducted master classes for children looking to become the next British skateboarding stars. Pete's challenge was part of a series of challenges which Disney XD set for UK personalities to help inspire children to try new activities. Viewers were able to watch the highlights of Pete's journey on Disney XD on 23 October 2009.

=== World record attempt ===
On 28 August 2009, 250 children came together to form a giant "human joystick" to set the new world record for the biggest ever game of virtual keepy-uppy, with former England and Liverpool F.C. football star and gaming fan, Jamie Redknapp, led the bid to enter the Guinness Book of World Records.
