= 2005 Euro Beach Soccer League =

Tournament details
- Dates: 8 July – 28 August
- Teams: 16 (from 1 confederation)
- Venue: 6 (in 6 host cities)

Final positions
- Champions: Italy (1st title)
- Runners-up: Portugal
- Third place: France
- Fourth place: Switzerland

Tournament statistics
- Matches played: 48
- Goals scored: 468 (9.75 per match)
- Top scorer: (Spain) Amarelle
- Best player: (Italy) Cristiano Scalabrelli
- Best goalkeeper: (Portugal) Bruno Alves

Locations of the events of the 2005 Euro Beach Soccer League
Division A events
Division B events
Division A & C events
Superfinal

The 2005 Euro Beach Soccer League, was the eighth edition of the Euro Beach Soccer League (EBSL), originally known as the European Pro Beach Soccer League, the premier beach soccer competition contested between European men's national teams, occurring annually since its establishment in 1998. The league was organised by Beach Soccer Worldwide (BSWW) between July 8 and August 28, 2005 in five different nations across Europe.

Following the preceding season, BSWW continued organising the nations of the EBSL across three divisions (A, B and C), with each team competing in their respective division to try and earn a place in the season-finale event, the Superfinal, in which the league title was then contested directly.

Italy were ultimately crowned champions, coming back from 5–1 down in the last period of the final to win their first European title. France entered the league as defending champions but lost in the Superfinal semi-finals, finishing the league in third place.

== Teams ==
This season, 16 nations took part in the Euro Beach Soccer League, which were distributed as follows:

=== Division A (4) ===
- France
- Italy
- Portugal
- Spain

=== Division B (8) ===
- Austria
- England
- Germany
- Greece
- Hungary
- Netherlands
- Norway
- Ukraine

=== Division C (4) ===
- Belgium
- Poland
- Russia
- Switzerland

=== Superfinal berths ===
There were eight berths available in this season's Superfinal. The table summarises in what positions nations needed to finish in their respective divisions in order to qualify to the Superfinal, what round of the Superfinal they would enter finishing in said positions, and the seeding they would receive.

Allocations

Seed	Position in Division	Division	Round entered
1	Winner	A	Semi-finals
2	Runner-up	A	Quarter-finals
3	Third place	A	Quarter-finals
4	Fourth place	A	Quarter-finals
5	Winner	B	Quarter-finals
6	Runner-up	B	Quarter-finals
7	Third place	B	Play-off round
8	Winner	C	Play-off round

- Division A was awarded four Superfinal berths (with only four teams in the division, all teams automatically qualified - the teams played to try and win the division in order to earn the single berth straight into the Superfinal semi-finals and, failing this, attain the best seeding possible)
- Division B received three berths and Division C, one.

Play off round

- Since the Division A winners received a bye in the quarter-finals, this meant one of the four quarter-final ties was to be void. The three other quarter-final matches only had enough spaces to accommodate six of the other seven teams qualified for Superfinal.
- Hence BSWW decided the top five of the remaining seven teams would go straight into the quarters, whilst a play-off round would take place between the two lowest ranked qualifiers (3rd Division B v Winner Division C) to determine who gets the final sixth quarter-final spot. The loser and now leftover seventh nation would have to settle for the consolation matches.

== Division A ==
Division A consisted of four rounds of fixtures known as stages, with one stage hosted in each of the four countries participating as shown. All four teams took part in each. In each stage, the teams played each other once. The nation who earned the most points at the end of the stage was crowned stage winners.

At the end of the four stages all results were tallied up in a final league table.

=== Stage 1 ===
The first stage took place in Tignes, France. Portugal won the event.

==== Matches ====
8 July 2005
France	7–5	Italy
Spain	11–4	Portugal
9 July 2005
France	7–4	Spain
Italy	6–7	Portugal
10 July 2005
Italy	5–4	Spain
France	4–7	Portugal

==== Final standings ====
Pos	Team	Pld	W	W+	L	GF	GA	GD	Pts
1	Portugal	3	2	0	1	18	21	–3	6
2	France	3	2	0	1	18	16	+2	6
3	Italy	3	1	0	2	16	18	−2	3
4	Spain	3	1	0	2	19	16	+3	3

Awards
Best player: (France) Jean-Marc Edouard
Top scorer(s): (Spain) Amarelle (9 goals)
Best goalkeeper: (Italy) Cristiano Scalabrelli

=== Stage 2 ===
The second stage took place in Figueira da Foz, Portugal. The hosts claimed their second stage win.

==== Matches ====
22 July 2005
Portugal	5–2	Italy
Spain	6–3	France
23 July 2005
Italy	1–2	Spain
Portugal	6–2	France
24 July 2005
Italy	6–3	France
Portugal	4–2	Spain

==== Final standings ====
Pos	Team	Pld	W	W+	L	GF	GA	GD	Pts
1	Portugal	3	3	0	0	15	6	+9	9
2	Spain	3	2	0	1	10	8	+2	6
3	Italy	3	1	0	2	9	10	−1	3
4	France	3	0	0	3	8	18	–10	0

Awards
Best player: (Portugal) Madjer
Top scorer(s): (Portugal) Madjer (8 goals)
Best goalkeeper: (Portugal) Bruno Silva

=== Stage 3 ===
The third and penultimate stage took place in Cervia, Italy. The hosts earned their first stage victory. Portugal earned enough points during this stage to secure first place in the final division standings.

==== Matches ====
29 July 2005
Italy	3–2	France
Portugal	4–3	Spain
30 July 2005
Italy	2–1	Portugal
Spain	6–6 (a.e.t.); 2–1 (pens.)	France
31 July 2005
Italy	5–3 (a.e.t.)	Spain
Portugal	10–7	France

==== Final standings ====
Pos	Team	Pld	W	W+	L	GF	GA	GD	Pts
1	Italy	3	2	1	0	10	6	+4	8
2	Portugal	3	2	0	1	15	12	+3	6
3	Spain	3	0	1	2	12	15	−3	2
4	France	3	0	0	3	15	19	–4	0

Awards
Best player: (Italy) Maurizio Galli
Top scorer(s): (Portugal) Madjer (7 goals)
Best goalkeeper: (Italy) Cristiano Scalabrelli

=== Stage 4 ===
The fourth and final stage took place in Santa Ponsa, Mallorca, Spain. Portugal won their third stage title.

==== Matches ====
5 August 2005
Portugal	2–3	France
Spain	9–3	Italy
6 August 2005
Spain	2–4	Portugal
France	5–3	Italy
7 August 2005
Portugal	6–2	Italy
Spain	5–4	France

==== Final standings ====
Pos	Team	Pld	W	W+	L	GF	GA	GD	Pts
1	Portugal	3	2	0	1	12	7	+5	6
2	France	3	2	0	1	12	10	+2	6
3	Spain	3	2	0	1	16	11	+5	6
4	Italy	3	0	0	3	8	20	–12	0

Awards
Best player: (Spain) Amarelle
Top scorer(s): (Spain) Amarelle (8 goals)
Best goalkeeper: (Portugal) Bruno Silva

=== Final table ===
All four teams automatically qualified to the Superfinal. However, finishing top of the division table earned that team a bye straight into the semifinals, whilst the final positions of the other three nations determined seedings in the quarter-finals.

Portugal were crowned winners, earning the bye into the Superfinal semi finals. Spain, by finishing second, ensured the next highest seeding meaning they would be drawn against the worst ranked team to make the Superfinal (the play-off winners) in the quarter-finals. On the other hand, France, finishing last, received the lowest seeding in Division A and hence suffered the consequences of having to play the next best seed, the winners of Division B.

Pos	Team	Pld	W	W+	L	GF	GA	GD	Pts	Qualification
1	Portugal	12	9	0	3	60	46	+14	27	Advance to Superfinal semi-finals
2	Spain	12	5	1	6	57	50	+7	17	Advance to Superfinal quarter-finals
3	Italy	12	4	1	7	43	54	−11	14	Advance to Superfinal quarter-finals
4	France	12	4	0	8	53	63	–10	12	Advance to Superfinal quarter-finals

== Division B ==
=== Results ===
- Dates: 8–10 July 2005
- Location: Linz, Austria

This season, Division B was played as a straight knockout tournament. The eight teams contesting the division started in the quarter-finals, playing one match per round until the final when the winner was crowned. The losers of the quarter-finals played in consolation matches to determine their final division placements.

Fifth place
England	4
Ukraine	10
Seventh place
Greece	4
Norway	3

Consolation semifinals
Greece	5 (0)
England (pens.)	5 (1)
Ukraine	6
Norway	2

Quarterfinals
Austria	4
Greece	3
Germany	6
England	2
Hungary	7
Ukraine	3
Netherlands	3
Norway	2

Semifinals
Austria	2
Germany	4
Hungary	8
Netherlands	4

Final
Germany	4
Hungary	5
Third place
Austria	5
Netherlands	4

Awards
Best player: (Ukraine) Oleksandr Pylypenko
Top scorer(s): (England) TD Al'Said, (Hungary) Ferenc Vígh (6 goals)
Best goalkeeper: (Germany) Dennis Prostka

=== Final standings ===
The top two nations qualified straight into the Superfinal quarter-finals along with three sides from Division A. The third placed team qualified to the Superfinal play-off round to contest the sixth and final quarter-final spot against the winners of Division C. The remaining Division B nations exited this season's EBSL.

Hungary won the Division B tournament title, whilst hosts Austria claimed the third and final spot in the Superfinal.

Rank	Team	Qualification
1st place, gold medalist(s)	Hungary	Advance to Superfinal quarter-finals
2nd place, silver medalist(s)	Germany	Advance to Superfinal quarter-finals
3rd place, bronze medalist(s)	Austria	Advance to Superfinal play-off round
4	Netherlands	
5	Ukraine	
6	England	
7	Greece	
8	Norway	

== Division C ==
The nations comprising Division C contested one round of fixtures. The teams played each other once. The nation who earned the most points at the end of the matches was crowned winner the division.

=== Matches ===
The fixtures were played in Santa Ponsa, Mallorca, Spain, alongside stage 4 of Division A.

5 August 2005
Belgium	2–5	Russia
Poland	2–2 (a.e.t.); 5–6 (pens.)	Switzerland
6 August 2005
Belgium	1–5	Poland
Switzerland	5–2	Russia
7 August 2005
Poland	3–2	Russia
Switzerland	7–2	Belgium

Awards
Best player: (N/A) ?
Top scorer(s): (Poland) Krzysztof Kuchciak (5 goals)
Best goalkeeper: (Poland) Marek Gorecky

=== Final table ===
The winners solely qualified to the Superfinal play-off round to play the lowest ranked qualifier from Division B to contest the sixth and final quarter-final spot. The remaining Division C nations exited this season's EBSL.

Switzerland were crowned winners.

Pos	Team	Pld	W	W+	L	GF	GA	GD	Pts	Qualification
1	Switzerland	3	2	1	0	14	6	+8	8	Advance to Superfinal play-off round
2	Poland	3	2	0	1	10	5	+5	6	
3	Russia	3	1	0	2	9	10	−1	3	
4	Belgium	3	0	0	3	5	17	–12	0	

== Superfinal ==
=== Qualified teams ===
This is a summary of the teams who qualified for the Superfinal.

Seed	Team	Division	Round entered
1	Portugal	A	Semi-finals
2	Spain	A	Quarter-finals
3	Italy	A	Quarter-finals
4	France	A	Quarter-finals
5	Hungary	B	Quarter-finals
6	Germany	B	Quarter-finals
7	Austria	B	Play-off round
8	Switzerland	C	Play-off round

=== Results ===
- Dates: 25–28 August 2005
- Location: Marseille, France

This season the Superfinal was played as a straight knockout tournament. Six teams contesting the title started in the quarter-finals, with Portugal joining in the semifinals, playing one match per round until the final when the winner of the 2005 Euro Beach Soccer League was crowned. The losers of the quarter-finals and play-off round played in consolation matches to determine their final league placements.

Firstly, the play-off round took place between the winners of Division C and the lowest ranked qualifiers from Division B for reasons explained earlier. The winners, Switzerland, moved on to the quarter-finals. The losers, Austria, retreated to the consolidation matches.

Play-off round
7	Austria	7
8	Switzerland (a.e.t.)	8

Following the play-off round, the main knockout stages and consolation matches of the Superfinal took place.

Fifth place
5	Hungary	5
2	Spain	7
Seventh place
7	Austria	2
6	Germany	6

Consolation semifinals
7	Austria	1
5	Hungary	6
6	Germany	4
2	Spain	7

Quarterfinals
1	Portugal
bye
4	France (pens.)	5 (2)
5	Hungary	5 (1)
3	Italy	6
6	Germany	4
8	Switzerland	4
2	Spain	3

Semifinals
1	Portugal	4
4	France	2
3	Italy	5
8	Switzerland	3

Final
1	Portugal	5 (1)
3	Italy (pens.)	5 (2)
Third place
4	France	6
8	Switzerland	2

=== Championship match details ===
28 August 2005
18:30

Portugal	5–5 (a.e.t.)	Italy
Hernâni; Belchior; Alan; Barraca	Report	Pasquali; Fruzzetti; Agostini
Penalties
Alan (penalty scored); Madjer (penalty missed)	1–2	(penalty scored) Fruzzetti; (penalty scored) Pasquali

Plages du Prado, Marseille

==== Winners ====
2005 Euro Beach Soccer League
champions

Italy
First title

Statistics
Top scorer(s): (Spain) Amarelle, (Italy) Massimo Agostini, (Hungary) Tamás Weisz (7 goals)
Best goalkeeper: (Spain) Roberto Valeiro (82.9% save rate)

=== Superfinal final standings ===
Italy beat favourites Portugal in the final on penalties to win their first Euro Beach Soccer League title.

Pos	Team	Notes
1	Italy	EBSL Champions
2	Portugal	Runners-up
3	France	Third place
4	Switzerland	
5	Spain	
6	Hungary	
7	Germany	
8	Austria	

== Sources ==
- Roonba
- BSWW
- RSSSF
