= England national beach soccer team =

England
- Nickname: The Three Lions
- Association: England Beach Soccer
- Confederation: UEFA (Europe)
- Captain: Aaron Clarke
- FIFA code: ENG
- BSWW ranking: 40 ▲1 (2 September 2026)
First colours
Second colours

First international
- Argentina 3 – 2 England (Rio, Brazil; 1995)

Biggest win
- Ireland 3 – 11 England (Barcelona, Spain; 16 February 2002); England 8 – 0 Georgia (Georgia (country)) (Warnemünde, Germany; 25 August 2018)

Biggest defeat
- Portugal 17 – 4 England (Porto, Portugal; 1 November 2009)

World Cup
- Appearances: 1 (first in 1995)
- Best result: 3rd place, 1995

Euro Beach Soccer League
- Appearances: 14 (first in 2001)
- Best result: 6th place, Division A (2001, 2004)

Euro Beach Soccer Cup
- Appearances: 3 (first in 2002)
- Best result: 5th place (2002, 2004)

The England national beach soccer team represents England in international beach soccer competitions and is controlled by England Beach Soccer — independent of the governing body of football in England, The Football Association.

== Coaching staff ==
Position	Staff
Head Coach	Angel Lopez Torres
Head of Delegation	Dan Hulme
Assistant Coach	
Goalkeeping Coach	
Physiotherapist	Abi Lunn

== Current squad ==
Caps and goals updated as of 9 August 2018.

No.	Pos.	Player	Date of birth (age)	Caps	Goals	Club
2	DF	Jake Younie	15 December 1992 (age 33)	24	16	(The Football Association) Isle of Wight
3	DF	Priestley Farquharson	15 March 1997 (age 29)	61	14	(The Football Association) Gunners
4	MF	Tom O'Neill	4 July 1997 (age 29)	66	16	(The Football Association) WKR Santos BSC
6	DF	Scott Lawson	16 December 1991 (age 34)	102	35	(The Football Association) Corinthian Casuals
7	FW	Jaz Camara	16 December 1998 (age 27)	25	7	(The Football Association) WKR Santos BSC
8	FW	Cameron O'Rourke	6 April 1999 (age 27)	51	32	(The Football Association) WKR Santos BSC
10	FW	Aaron Clarke	10 June 1991 (age 35)	119	124	(Royal Spanish Football Federation) Levante
11	MF	Jack Morris	28 September 1991 (age 35)	48	8	(The Football Association) Isle of Wight
12	DF	Ben Bowra	3 January 1987 (age 39)	2	0	(The Football Association) Corinthian Casuals
13	GK	Dan Hulme	4 May 1989 (age 37)	15	0	(The Football Association) Corinthian Casuals
14	FW	Jack Love	21 September 1999 (age 27)	11	4	(The Football Association) Isle of Wight
16	MF	Mitchell Day	18 August 1982 (age 44)	126	103	(Portuguese Football Federation) Victoria
21	GK	Tommy Jackson	27 April 1999 (age 27)	58	0	(The Football Association) Isle of Wight

== Recent results and upcoming fixtures ==
Matches played within the last 12 months, as well as upcoming fixtures, are displayed.

== Competition history ==
England participated in the first ever Beach Soccer World Cup in 1995, finishing third, but did not participate in any of the competitions between 1995 and 2001. In 2001 England began competing in the EBSL which doubled as a qualifying competition for the following year's World Cup until 2008 but England did not perform well enough during these years to qualify for the finals. In 2008, a separate qualifying competition was introduced, but England have still failed to progress to the World Cup finals.

=== World Cup ===
Year	Result	Pld	W	W+	L	GF	GA	GD
Beach Soccer World Championships
Brazil 1995	Third place	5	2	0	3	20	26	−6
Brazil 1996	did not enter							
Brazil 1997	did not enter							
Brazil 1998	did not enter							
Brazil 1999	did not enter							
Brazil 2000	did not enter							
Brazil 2001	did not enter							
Brazil 2002	did not qualify							
Brazil 2003	did not qualify							
Brazil 2004	did not qualify							
FIFA Beach Soccer World Cup
Brazil 2005	did not qualify							
Brazil 2006	did not qualify							
Brazil 2007	did not qualify							
France 2008	did not qualify							
(United Arab Emirates) UAE 2009	did not qualify							
Italy 2011	did not qualify							
(French Polynesia) Tahiti 2013	did not qualify							
Portugal 2015	did not qualify							
(The Bahamas) Bahamas 2017	did not qualify							
Paraguay 2019	did not qualify							
Russia 2021	did not qualify							
(United Arab Emirates) UAE 2023	did not qualify							
Seychelles 2025	did not qualify							
Total	1/23	5	2	0	3	20	26	−6

=== FIFA Beach Soccer World Cup Qualification (UEFA) ===
FIFA Beach Soccer World Cup Qualification Record
Year	Round	Pld	W	WE	WP	L	GS	GA	Dif	Pts
(Spain) 2008	-	3	1	1	0	1	8	15	-7	5
(Spain) 2009	-	3	1	0	0	2	8	12	-4	3
(Italy) 2011	-	3	1	0	0	2	6	11	-5	3
(Russia) 2013	-	3	0	0	0	3	4	18	-14	0
(Italy) 2015	-	8	2	1	0	5	26	35	-9	8
(Italy) 2017	-	3	1	0	0	2	7	15	-8	3
(Russia) 2019	did not qualify									
(Portugal) 2021	-	3	1	0	1	1	6	6	-6	4
(Azerbaijan) 2023	did not qualify									
(Spain) 2025	Round of 16	4	0	1	0	3	8	24	-16	2
Total	8/10	26	5	3	0	18	66	130	-64	21

=== Euro Beach Soccer League ===
Key:

Indicator	Description
Yes	Qualified to the Promotion Final (see † for more)
1st place	If the team was playing in the Superfinal, this indicates the team won the event and became league champions If the team was playing in the Promotion Final, this indicates the team won the event and earned promotion.
†	2001–2008: Teams could qualify to the Superfinal from all divisions to contest the league title (A, B and C); 2009–present: Only teams from Division A can qualify to the Superfinal to contest the league title 2009–present: Only teams from Division B can qualify to the Promotion Final and contest promotion to Division A (and last place Division A)
‡	A sole division comprising all teams of the EBSL existed in this year
§	The Superfinal was not established until 2001

Results:

Year	Main season			Superfinal / Promotion Final^{†}			Match stats							
Year	Division	No. of Teams	Result	Qualified?	No. of Teams	Result	Pld	W	W+	L	GF	GA	GD	Pts
1998	did not enter													
1999	did not enter													
2000	did not enter													
2001	‡	8	6th place	No	—N/a		9	1	1	7	37	88	−51	5
2002	B	6	5th place	No	—N/a		12	4	0	8	47	81	−34	12
2003	A	5	5th place	No	—N/a		12	0	0	12	40	87	−47	0
2004	A	6	6th place	No	—N/a		9	0	0	9	26	62	−36	0
2005	B	8	6th place	No	—N/a		3	1	1	1	11	21	−10	5
2006	B	9	7th place	No	—N/a		6	0	2	4	16	24	−8	4
2007	‡	12	7th place	No	—N/a		2	1	0	1	8	7	+1	3
2008	‡	17	16th place	No	—N/a		3	0	0	3	6	13	–7	0
2009	B	10	7th place	No	—N/a		2	1	0	1	7	7	0	3
2010	B	11	6th place	No^{1}	6	6th place	5	1	0	4	9	17	–8	3
2011	B	12	10th place	No	—N/a		2	0	0	2	5	12	–7	0
2012	B	12	9th place	No	—N/a		3	1	0	2	9	15	–6	3
2013	B	12	2nd place	Yes	8	8th place	7	3	0	4	23	19	+4	9
2014	B	12	7th place	Yes	8	6th place	7	2	1	3	33	32	+1	8
2015	B	8	6th place	Yes	8	4th place	7	2	1	4	24	25	–1	8
2016	B	14	4th place	Yes	8	3rd place	6	3	1	2	20	11	+9	11
2017	B	15	2nd place	Yes	8	5th place								
2018	B	15	1st place	Yes	8	6th place								
2019	B	16	12th place	No	—N/a									
2020	Season cancelled													
2021	did not enter													
2022	B	—		Yes	12	8th place								
2023	B	—		Yes	8	5th place								
2024	withdrew													
2025	B	4	4th place	No	—N/a									
Total	n/a	22/28					95	20	7	68	321	521	−200	74

1. England did not qualify during the regular season but did compete in the Promotion Final due to replacing the Czech Republic's as the next best team after the Czechs' withdrawal

=== Euro Beach Soccer Cup ===
Year	Round	Result	Pld	W	W+	L	GF	GA	GD
(Italy) 1998	did not enter								
(Spain) 1999	did not enter								
(Spain) 2001	did not enter								
(Spain) 2002	Group Stage	Fifth place /8	3	2	0	1	18	10	+8
(Belgium) 2003	did not qualify								
(Portugal) 2004	Group Stage	Fifth place /8	3	2	0	1	8	11	–3
(Russia) 2005	did not qualify								
(Italy) 2006	did not qualify								
(Spain) 2007	did not qualify								
(Azerbaijan) 2008	Group Stage	Sixth place /6	3	0	0	3	5	16	–11
(Italy) 2009	did not qualify/enter								
(Italy) 2010	did not qualify/enter								
(Russia) 2012	did not qualify/enter								
(Azerbaijan) 2014	did not qualify/enter								
(Serbia) 2016	did not qualify/enter								
Total	3/15		9	4	0	5	31	37	−6

== Best performances ==
- Beach Soccer World Cup
  - Third place (1): 1995
- Euro Beach Soccer League
  - Single Division era ('98–'01, '07–'08)
    - Sixth place (of 8), Main Season: 2001
  - Multi-Division era ('02–'06, 09'–present)
    - Division A: Fifth place, Main Season: 2003
    - Division B: Third place, Promotion Final: 2016
