= 2003 Euro Beach Soccer League =

Tournament details
- Dates: 6 June – 30 August
- Teams: 9 (from 1 confederation)
- Venue(s): 9 (in 9 host cities)

Final positions
- Champions: Spain (4th title)
- Runners-up: France
- Third place: Portugal
- Fourth place: Switzerland

Tournament statistics
- Matches played: 61
- Goals scored: 653 (10.7 per match)
- Top scorer(s): (Portugal) Madjer
- Best player(s): (Spain) Ramiro Amarelle
- Best goalkeeper: (Switzerland) Adrian Lingenhag

Locations of the events of the 2003 Euro Beach Soccer League
Division A events
Division B events
Superfinal & Division B event

The 2003 Euro Beach Soccer League, was the sixth edition of the Euro Beach Soccer League (EBSL), the premier beach soccer competition contested between European men's national teams, known as the European Pro Beach Soccer League at the time, occurring annually since its establishment in 1998. The league was organised by Beach Soccer Worldwide (BSWW) between June 6 and August 31, 2003 in nine different nations across Europe.

This was the last time the tournament would be held under the Pro title, as the following season the tournament was renamed and shortened to the Euro Beach Soccer League.

Following the preceding season, BSWW continued organising the nations of the EBSL across two distinct groups based on ability. This season the two groups were renamed as Division A, the top tier group, comprising the best nations of the Europe and Division B, the lower tier group, consisting of teams with lesser ability than those in A; these replaced the Southern and Northern "divisions" established in 2002. Each team competed in their respective division to try and earn a place in the season-finale event, the Superfinal, in which the league title was then contested directly.

Spain, having won three successive titles from 1999 to 2001, successfully reclaimed the title by defeating France in extra-time in the final. This was the fourth European title won by the Spanish. Portugal, who entered as defending champions, lost in the Superfinal semi-finals, ultimately finishing in third place.

The league also doubled as the qualification process for the 2004 Beach Soccer World Championship. The nations finishing in first, second, third and fourth place qualified.

== Teams ==
This season 9 nations took part in the Euro Beach Soccer League whom were and were distributed as follows:

=== Division A (5) ===
- England
- France
- Italy
- Portugal
- Spain

=== Division B (4) ===
- Austria
- Belgium
- ~~Germany~~ (withdrew)
- Norway
- Switzerland

=== Superfinal berths ===
There were six berths available in this season's Superfinal. The table summarises in what positions nations needed to finish in their respective divisions in order to qualify to the Superfinal, what round of the Superfinal they would enter finishing in said positions, and the seeding they would receive.

Allocations
The amount of qualification spots available in the Superfinal from each division reflected the abilities of the nations in the respective tiers.

- Division A, consisting of the best teams of the EBSL, was awarded four Superfinal berths
- Division B, as the bottom tier, received two berths

| # | Position in Division | Division | Round entered |
|---|---|---|---|
| 1 | Winner | A | Semi-finals |
| 2 | Runner-up | A | Semi-finals |
| 3 | Third place | A | Quarter-finals |
| 4 | Fourth place | A | Quarter-finals |
| 5 | Winner | B | Quarter-finals |
| 6 | Runner-up | B | Quarter-finals |

== Division A ==
Division A consisted of five rounds of fixtures known as stages, with one stage hosted in each of the five countries participating as shown. Four teams took part in each, with each team taking part in a total of four of the five stages. In each stage, the teams played each other once. The nation who earned the most points at the end of the stage was crowned stage winners.

At the end of the five stages all results were tallied up in a final league table.

=== Stage 1 ===
The first stage took place in Estoril, Portugal. The hosts claimed the opening stage of Division A.

==== Matches ====
6 June 2003
| Spain | 5–3 | England |
| Portugal | 7–3 | Italy |
7 June 2003
| Spain | 2–3 (a.e.t.) | Italy |
| Portugal | 9–2 | England |
8 June 2003
| Italy | 5–2 | England |
| Portugal | 5–4 | Spain |

==== Final standings ====
| Pos | Team | Pld | W | W+ | L | GF | GA | GD | Pts |
|---|---|---|---|---|---|---|---|---|---|
| 1 | Portugal | 3 | 3 | 0 | 0 | 21 | 9 | +12 | 9 |
| 2 | Italy | 3 | 1 | 1 | 1 | 11 | 11 | 0 | 5 |
| 3 | Spain | 3 | 1 | 0 | 2 | 11 | 11 | 0 | 3 |
| 4 | England | 3 | 0 | 0 | 3 | 7 | 19 | –12 | 0 |

Awards
Best player: (Italy) Massimo Agostini
Top scorer(s): (Italy) Massimo Agostini (8 goals)
Best goalkeeper: (Portugal) Zé Miguel

=== Stage 2 ===
The second stage took place in Brighton, England. Portugal won their second stage of the season.

==== Matches ====
27 June 2003
| England | 4–6 | Portugal |
| Italy | 2–3 | France |
28 June 2003
| Italy | 5–5 (a.e.t.); 1–0 (pens.) | Portugal |
| England | 5–7 | France |
29 June 2003
| England | 5–7 | Italy |
| Portugal | 5–2 | France |

==== Final standings ====
| Pos | Team | Pld | W | W+ | L | GF | GA | GD | Pts |
|---|---|---|---|---|---|---|---|---|---|
| 1 | Portugal | 3 | 2 | 0 | 1 | 16 | 11 | +5 | 6 |
| 2 | France | 3 | 2 | 0 | 1 | 12 | 12 | 0 | 6 |
| 3 | Italy | 3 | 1 | 1 | 1 | 14 | 13 | +1 | 5 |
| 4 | England | 3 | 0 | 0 | 3 | 14 | 20 | –6 | 0 |

Awards
Best player: (England) Andrew Grainger
Top scorer(s): (Portugal) Alan (7 goals)
Best goalkeeper: (Portugal) Zé Miguel

=== Stage 3 ===
The third stage took place in Marseille, France. Spain won the stage.

==== Matches ====
4 July 2003
| Spain | 9–1 | Portugal |
| France | 7–6 | Italy |
5 July 2003
| Portugal | 7–6 | Italy |
| France | 6–8 | Spain |
6 July 2003
| Italy | 5–9 | Spain |
| France | 7–11 | Portugal |

==== Final standings ====
| Pos | Team | Pld | W | W+ | L | GF | GA | GD | Pts |
|---|---|---|---|---|---|---|---|---|---|
| 1 | Spain | 3 | 3 | 0 | 0 | 26 | 12 | +14 | 9 |
| 2 | Portugal | 3 | 2 | 0 | 1 | 19 | 22 | –3 | 6 |
| 3 | France | 3 | 1 | 0 | 2 | 20 | 25 | –5 | 3 |
| 4 | Italy | 3 | 0 | 0 | 3 | 17 | 23 | –6 | 0 |

Awards
Best player: (Spain) Amarelle
Top scorer(s): (Spain) Amarelle (12 goals)
Best goalkeeper: (Spain) Roberto Valeiro

=== Stage 4 ===
The fourth stage took place in Lignano Sabbiadoro, Italy. A second stage victory was claimed by Spain.

==== Matches ====
25 July 2003
| Spain | 6–3 | France |
| Italy | 6–1 | England |
26 July 2003
| Italy | 4–6 | Spain |
| England | 7–7 (a.e.t.); 0–1 (pens.) | France |
27 July 2003
| Spain | 7–1 | England |
| Italy | 3–2 | France |

==== Final standings ====
| Pos | Team | Pld | W | W+ | L | GF | GA | GD | Pts |
|---|---|---|---|---|---|---|---|---|---|
| 1 | Spain | 3 | 3 | 0 | 0 | 19 | 8 | +11 | 9 |
| 2 | Italy | 3 | 2 | 0 | 1 | 13 | 9 | +4 | 6 |
| 3 | France | 3 | 0 | 1 | 2 | 12 | 16 | –4 | 2 |
| 4 | England | 3 | 0 | 0 | 3 | 9 | 20 | –11 | 0 |

Awards
Best player: (Italy) Andrea Forte
Top scorer(s): (Spain) Manuel Bustillo (6 goals)
Best goalkeeper: (Italy) Alessandro Giovinazzo

=== Stage 5 ===
The fifth and final stage took place in Palma de Mallorca, Mallorca, Spain. The hosts won their third consecutive stage title of the season.

==== Matches ====
8 August 2003
| France | 9–3 | Portugal |
| Spain | 8–4 | England |
9 August 2003
| Spain | 5–4 | France |
| Portugal | 10–1 | England |
10 August 2003
| France | 9–5 | England |
| Spain | 6–4 | Portugal |

==== Final standings ====
| Pos | Team | Pld | W | W+ | L | GF | GA | GD | Pts |
|---|---|---|---|---|---|---|---|---|---|
| 1 | Spain | 3 | 3 | 0 | 0 | 19 | 12 | +7 | 9 |
| 2 | France | 3 | 2 | 0 | 1 | 22 | 13 | +9 | 6 |
| 3 | Portugal | 3 | 1 | 0 | 2 | 17 | 16 | +1 | 3 |
| 4 | England | 3 | 0 | 0 | 3 | 10 | 27 | –17 | 0 |

Awards
Best player: (Spain) Eloy Souto
Top scorer(s): (France) Didier Samoun, (Portugal) Madjer (6 goals)
Best goalkeeper: (Spain) Roberto Valeiro

=== Final table ===
The top four teams qualified to the Superfinal, fifth place exited this year's competition. Finishing first and second earned those teams byes straight into the semi-finals of the Superfinal, whilst finishing in third and fourth qualified those nations to the quarter-finals.

Spain were crowned winners of the division and earned the bye into the Superfinal semi-finals along with runners-up Portugal. Having failed to win any matches, England were rooted to the bottom of the table and were eliminated.

| Pos | Team | Pld | W | W+ | L | GF | GA | GD | Pts | Qualification |
|---|---|---|---|---|---|---|---|---|---|---|
| 1 | Spain | 12 | 10 | 0 | 2 | 75 | 43 | +32 | 30 | Advance to Superfinal semi-finals |
| 2 | Portugal | 12 | 8 | 0 | 4 | 73 | 58 | +15 | 24 | Advance to Superfinal semi-finals |
| 3 | France | 12 | 5 | 1 | 6 | 66 | 66 | 0 | 17 | Advance to Superfinal quarter-finals |
| 4 | Italy | 12 | 4 | 2 | 6 | 55 | 56 | –1 | 16 | Advance to Superfinal quarter-finals |
| 5 | England | 12 | 0 | 0 | 12 | 40 | 86 | –46 | 0 | |

== Division B ==
The second tier consisted of four rounds of fixtures known as stages, with one stage hosted in each of the four countries participating as shown. All four teams took part in each stage. In every round of fixtures the teams played each other once. The nation who earned the most points at the end of the stage was crowned stage winners.

Germany were originally due to participate and host a stage but ultimately withdrew before the competition began.

At the end of the four stages all results were tallied up in a final league table.

=== Stage 1 ===
The first stage took place in Stavanger, Norway. The hosts were winners of the event.

==== Matches ====
18 July 2003
| Norway | 12–5 | Austria |
| Switzerland | 4–2 | Belgium |
19 July 2003
| Austria | 4–5 | Switzerland |
| Norway | 6–1 | Belgium |
20 July 2003
| Austria | 5–7 | Belgium |
| Norway | 4–3 (a.e.t.) | Switzerland |

==== Final standings ====
| Pos | Team | Pld | W | W+ | L | GF | GA | GD | Pts |
|---|---|---|---|---|---|---|---|---|---|
| 1 | Norway | 3 | 2 | 1 | 0 | 22 | 9 | +13 | 8 |
| 2 | Switzerland | 3 | 2 | 0 | 1 | 12 | 10 | +2 | 6 |
| 3 | Belgium | 3 | 1 | 0 | 2 | 10 | 15 | –5 | 3 |
| 4 | Austria | 3 | 0 | 0 | 3 | 14 | 24 | –10 | 0 |

Awards
Best player: (Norway) Roar Fredriksen
Top scorer(s): (Norway) Roar Fredriksen, (Norway) Jørn Larsen (6 goals)
Best goalkeeper: (Norway) Karl Rossland

=== Stage 2 ===
The second stage took place in Linz, Austria. Hosts Austria won the event based on their head-to-head record with Switzerland.

==== Matches ====
25 July 2003
| Austria | 12–5 | Norway |
| Switzerland | 4–1 | Belgium |
26 July 2003
| Austria | 6–8 | Belgium |
| Switzerland | 9–4 | Norway |
27 July 2003
| Austria | 9–8 | Switzerland |
| Belgium | 5–6 | Norway |

==== Final standings ====
| Pos | Team | Pld | W | W+ | L | GF | GA | GD | Pts |
|---|---|---|---|---|---|---|---|---|---|
| 1 | Austria | 3 | 2 | 0 | 1 | 27 | 21 | +6 | 6 |
| 2 | Switzerland | 3 | 2 | 0 | 1 | 21 | 14 | +7 | 6 |
| 3 | Norway | 3 | 1 | 0 | 2 | 15 | 26 | –11 | 3 |
| 4 | Belgium | 3 | 1 | 0 | 2 | 14 | 16 | –2 | 3 |

Awards
Best player: (Switzerland) Angelo Schirinzi
Top scorer(s): (Austria) Richard Niederbacher (10 goals)
Best goalkeeper: (Switzerland) Adrian Lingenhag

=== Stage 3 ===
The third stage took place in Bern, Switzerland. Norway were crowned stage champions based on their head-to-head record with Belgium.

==== Matches ====
15 August 2003
| Belgium | 5–2 | Austria |
| Switzerland | 8–8 (a.e.t.); 3–4 (pens.) | Norway |
16 August 2003
| Norway | 6–5 | Belgium |
| Switzerland | 5–4 (a.e.t.) | Austria |
17 August 2003
| Norway | 3–9 | Austria |
| Switzerland | 3–4 (a.e.t.) | Belgium |

==== Final standings ====
| Pos | Team | Pld | W | W+ | L | GF | GA | GD | Pts |
|---|---|---|---|---|---|---|---|---|---|
| 1 | Norway | 3 | 1 | 1 | 1 | 17 | 22 | –5 | 5 |
| 2 | Belgium | 3 | 1 | 1 | 1 | 14 | 11 | +3 | 5 |
| 3 | Austria | 3 | 1 | 0 | 2 | 15 | 13 | +2 | 3 |
| 4 | Switzerland | 3 | 0 | 1 | 2 | 16 | 16 | 0 | 2 |

Awards
Best player: (Switzerland) Stephan Meier
Top scorer(s): (Norway) Jørn Larsen, (Belgium) Mathieu Belme (7 goals)
Best goalkeeper: (Austria) Michael Konsel

=== Stage 4 ===
The fourth and next to last stage took place in Knokke, Belgium. Switzerland claimed the final stage of Division B.

==== Matches ====
22 August 2003
| Switzerland | 8–4 | Austria |
| Belgium | 8–3 | Norway |
23 August 2003
| Norway | 6–5 | Austria |
| Belgium | 4–5 | Switzerland |
24 August 2003
| Switzerland | 5–4 | Norway |
| Belgium | 6–6 (a.e.t.); 1–2 (pens.) | Austria |

==== Final standings ====
| Pos | Team | Pld | W | W+ | L | GF | GA | GD | Pts |
|---|---|---|---|---|---|---|---|---|---|
| 1 | Switzerland | 3 | 3 | 0 | 0 | 18 | 12 | +6 | 9 |
| 2 | Belgium | 3 | 1 | 0 | 2 | 18 | 14 | +4 | 3 |
| 3 | Norway | 3 | 1 | 0 | 2 | 13 | 18 | –5 | 3 |
| 4 | Austria | 3 | 0 | 1 | 2 | 15 | 20 | –5 | 2 |

Awards
Best player: (Belgium) David Christiaens
Top scorer(s): (Switzerland) Stephan Meier (9 goals)
Best goalkeeper: (Switzerland) Adrian Lingenhag

=== Final table ===
The top two teams qualified to the Superfinal, entering at the quarter-final stage. The remaining Division B nations exited this season's EBSL.

Switzerland were crowned winners, with runners-up Norway also successfully qualifying for the season-ending event.

| Pos | Team | Pld | W | W+ | L | GF | GA | GD | Pts | Qualification |
|---|---|---|---|---|---|---|---|---|---|---|
| 1 | Switzerland | 12 | 7 | 1 | 4 | 67 | 52 | +15 | 23 | Advance to Superfinal quarter-finals |
| 2 | Norway | 12 | 5 | 2 | 5 | 67 | 75 | –8 | 19 | Advance to Superfinal quarter-finals |
| 3 | Belgium | 12 | 4 | 1 | 7 | 56 | 56 | 0 | 14 | |
| 4 | Austria | 12 | 3 | 1 | 8 | 71 | 78 | –7 | 11 | |

== Superfinal ==
=== Qualified teams ===
This is a summary of the teams who qualified for the Superfinal.

| # | Team | Division | Round entered |
|---|---|---|---|
| 1 | Spain | A | Semi-finals |
| 2 | Portugal | A | Semi-finals |
| 3 | France | A | Quarter-finals |
| 4 | Italy | A | Quarter-finals |
| 5 | Switzerland | B | Quarter-finals |
| 6 | Norway | B | Quarter-finals |

=== Results ===
- Dates: 28–30 August 2003
- Location: Knokke, Belgium

This season the Superfinal was played as a straight knockout tournament. Four of the six teams contesting the title started in the quarter-finals, whilst the top two nations from Division A received a bye and started in the semi-finals. The teams played one match per round until the final when the winner of the 2003 Euro Beach Soccer League was crowned. The losers of the quarter and semi-finals played in consolation matches to determine their final league placements.

Unlike in previous years, Monte Carlo, Monaco was unable to host the event. After also failing to organise the Superfinal in Cannes, France, Knokke, Belgium was finally confirmed as the season-finale hosts, following on from being the venue of the final stage of Division B.

Quarter-finals
Switzerland (a.e.t.) | 6
Norway | 5
France | 4
Italy | 3

Semi-finals
Spain | 9
Switzerland | 3
Portugal | 6
France | 7
5th place match
Norway | 6
Italy (a.e.t.) | 7

Final
Spain (a.e.t.) | 8
France | 7
3rd place match
Switzerland | 4
Portugal | 8

=== Championship match details ===
30 August 2003

| Spain | 8–7 (a.e.t.) | France |
|---|---|---|
| Eloy 2', 10'; J. Salinas 3'; Nico 13', 17', ?'; Amarelle 13', 24' | Report | 6', 16' Cantona; 12', 26' Sciortino; 24' Jairzinho; 25' Marquet; 33' Bonora |

Knokke, Belgium
Referee: Pinto Correia (Portugal)

==== Winners ====
2003 Euro Beach Soccer League
champions

Spain
Fourth title

Statistics
Top scorer(s): (Portugal) Madjer (10 goals)
Best goalkeeper: (Spain) Roberto Valeiro (84.8% save rate)

=== Superfinal final standings ===
Spain beat France in the final to win their fourth Euro Beach Soccer League title and successfully reclaim their crown after losing it to Portugal last year.

Finishing in the top four positions also earned those nations qualification straight into the upcoming World Cup.

| Pos | Team | Notes | Qualification |
|---|---|---|---|
| 1 | Spain | EBSL Champions | Qualified to 2004 Beach Soccer World Championship |
| 2 | France | Runners-up | Qualified to 2004 Beach Soccer World Championship |
| 3 | Portugal | Third place | Qualified to 2004 Beach Soccer World Championship |
| 4 | Switzerland | | Qualified to 2004 Beach Soccer World Championship |
| 5 | Italy | | |
| 6 | Norway | | |

== Sources ==
- Roonba
- BSWW archive
- RSSSF
