= Ramiro Amarelle =

Spanish beach soccer player and coach (born 1977)

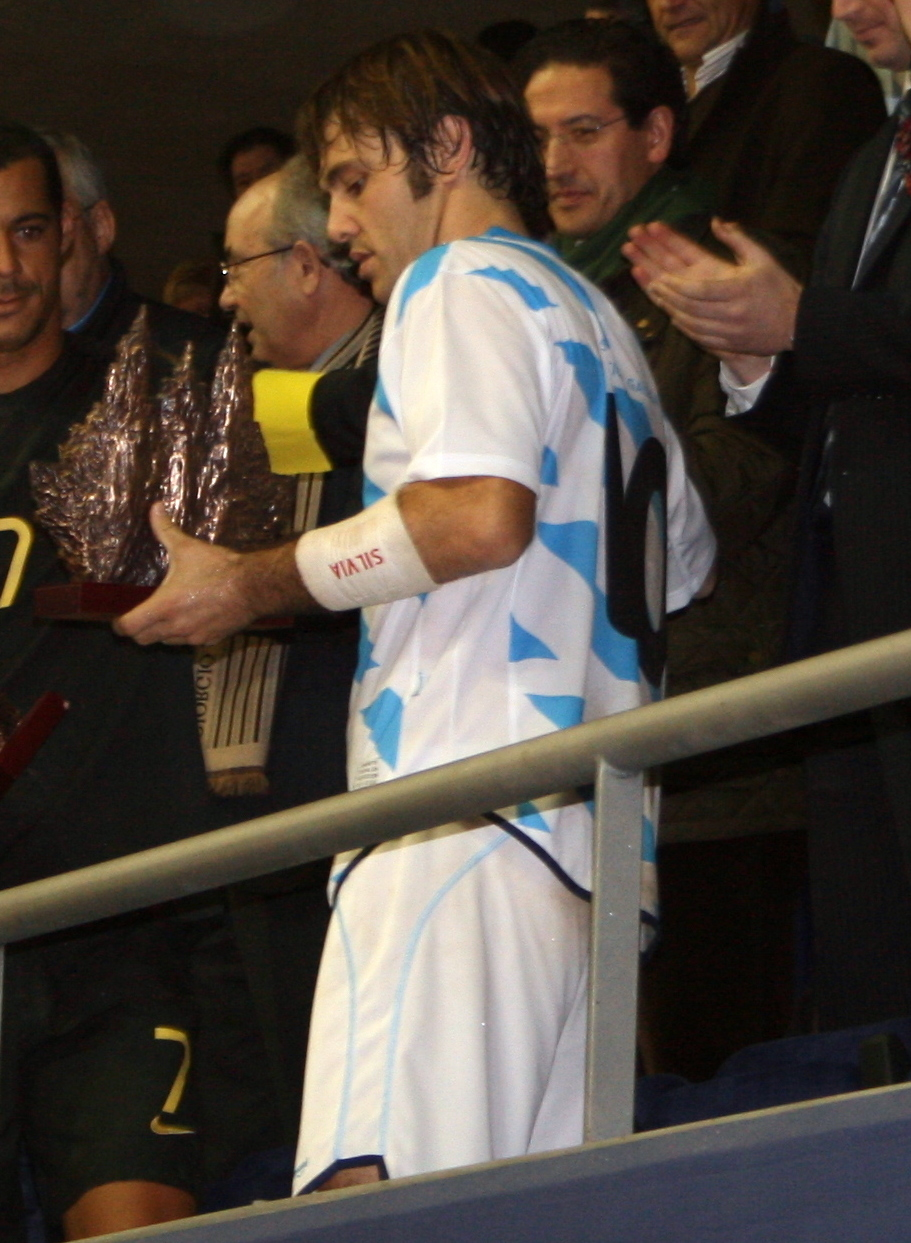

Personal information
- Full name: Ramiro Figueiras Amarelle
- Date of birth: December 17, 1977 (age 48)
- Place of birth: Ponteceso, Galicia, Spain
- Height: 1.82 m (6 ft 0 in)
- Position: Forward

Youth career
- 1993–1996: RC Deportivo (Football)

Senior career*
Years	Team	Apps	(Gls)
1996–1997	RC Deportivo B (Football)		
1997–1998	Imperator Oar SF		
2006–2010	Milano Beach Soccer	200	(191)
2010–2015	FC Barcelona		

International career
1997–2013	Spain	309	(303)

Managerial career
- 2017–2021: China
- 2021–?: Trinidad and Tobago
- 2021: CD San Francisco Beach Soccer
- 2022: UAE
- 2022: Villarreal (assistant)
- 2025: Beijing Guoan (assistant)
- 2025: Beijing Guoan (caretaker)
- 2025–2026: Shenzhen Juniors
Medal record
Representing Spain
Men's Beach Soccer
FIFA Beach Soccer World Cup
Bronze medal – third place	2000
Silver medal – second place	2003
Silver medal – second place	2004
FIFA Beach Soccer World Cup Qualifiers
Gold medal – first place	2008
Gold medal – first place	2009
Euro Beach Soccer League
Gold medal – first place	1999
Gold medal – first place	2000
Gold medal – first place	2001
Gold medal – first place	2003
Gold medal – first place	2006
Silver medal – second place	2002
Bronze medal – third place	1998
Euro Beach Soccer Cup
Gold medal – first place	2008
Gold medal – first place	2009
Silver medal – second place	1998
Silver medal – second place	2004
Copa Latina
Silver medal – second place	2000
Silver medal – second place	2004
Mundialito
Silver medal – second place	2004
Bronze medal – third place	2001
Bronze medal – third place	2009
BSWW Tour
Silver medal – second place	2001
World League
Bronze medal – third place	2001
- * Club domestic league appearances and goals

Ramiro Figueiras Amarelle (born 17 December 1977) is a Spanish former professional beach soccer player and current football coach. Widely regarded as one of the greatest beach soccer players in history, he captained the Spain national beach soccer team and scored 303 goals in 309 international appearances between 1997 and 2013. In 2019, France Football ranked him third in their list of the "10 Legends of Beach Soccer".

== Playing career ==
=== Early life and football career ===
Ramiro Figueiras Amarelle was born on 17 December 1977 in Ponteceso, a coastal town in Galicia, Spain. He joined the youth academy of Deportivo de La Coruña in 1993, helping the youth team win the Copa de Campeones Juvenil de Fútbol in the 1995–96 season. He then played for Deportivo's reserve side, Deportivo de La Coruña B, in 1996–97 as a forward. In 1997–98, he had a brief stint with Imperator Oar SF before fully transitioning to beach soccer after impressing in Spain's national beach soccer championship.

=== Beach soccer playing career ===
Amarelle debuted for Spain in 1997, becoming captain and wearing the number 10 jersey. He made 309 appearances and scored 303 goals by 2013. Spain finished runner-up at the FIFA Beach Soccer World Cup (formerly World Championships) in 2003, 2004, and 2013; third in 2000; and fourth in 2008. They won the Euro Beach Soccer League in 1999, 2000, 2001, 2003, and 2006 (runner-up 2002, 2014, 2018; third 1998), plus multiple stage wins (e.g., Mallorca 2004, Stavanger 2004, Scoglitti 2004, Mallorca Group A 2006) and runner-ups (e.g., Portimão 2004, Tignes Group A 2006). Other titles include the Euro Beach Soccer Cup (winners 2008, 2009, 2014; runner-up 1998, 2001, 2002, 2004), runner-up in Copa Latina (2000, 2004), Mundialito runner-up (2004) and third (2001, 2009), BSWW Tour runner-up (2001), and World League third place (2001).

At club level, with Milano Beach Soccer (2006–2010), he scored 191 goals in 200 matches, winning Scudetto (2006, 2007), Coppa Italia (2006, 2007, 2009), Serie A top scorer (2006), and Coppa Italia top scorer (2007). With FC Barcelona (2010–2015), he won the Mundialito de Clubes in 2015.

== Honours ==
=== Football career ===
- Deportivo de La Coruña Juvenil (1993–1996): Won the Copa de Campeones Juvenil de Fútbol (1995–1996).
- Deportivo de La Coruña B (1996–1998): Played as a forward before transitioning to beach soccer.
- Imperator Oar SF (1997–1998): Brief stint in traditional football.

=== Beach soccer ===
==== Club ====
- Milano Beach Soccer (Italy):
  - Scudetto: 2006, 2007
  - Coppa Italia: 2006, 2007, 2009
- FC Barcelona:
  - Mundialito de Clubes: 2015
  - North American Sand Soccer Championships
    - Winners (2): 2015, 2017
    - Third Place: 2016

==== International ====
- Beach Soccer World Championships (post 2005: FIFA Beach Soccer World Cup):
  - Runner-up: 2003, 2004, 2013
  - Third place: 2000
- Euro Beach Soccer League:
  - Winner: 1999, 2000, 2001, 2003, 2006
  - Runner-up: 2002, 2014, 2018
  - Third place: 1998
  - Event-specific wins:
    - Spanish Event (Mallorca): 2004
    - Norwegian Event (Stavanger): 2004
    - Italian Event (Scoglitti): 2004
    - Group A Event (Mallorca, Spain): 2006
  - Runner-up in events:
    - Portuguese Event (Portimão): 2004
    - Group A Event (Tignes, France): 2006
- Euro Beach Soccer Cup:
  - Winner: 1998 2008, 2009, 2014
  - Runner-up: 1998, 2001, 2002, 2004
- Copa Latina:
  - Runner-up: 2000, 2004
- Mundialito:
  - Runner-up: 2004
  - Third place: 2001, 2009
- BSWW Tour:
  - Runner-up: 2001
- World League:
  - Third place: 2001

=== Individual awards ===
- FIFA Beach Soccer World Cup:
  - MVP (Golden Ball): 2003, 2008
  - Silver Shoe: 2008
- Euro Beach Soccer League:
  - MVP: 1998, 2000, 2001, 2003
  - Top Scorer: 1998, 2007
  - Rookie of the Year: 1998
  - Event-specific awards:
    - Norwegian Event (Stavanger) Best Player: 2004
    - Italian Event (Scoglitti) Best Player: 2004
    - Portuguese Event (Portimão) Top Scorer: 2004
    - Italian Stage (San Benedetto del Tronto) Top Scorer: 2007
- Mundialito:
  - MVP: 2001
  - Top Scorer: 2009
- BSWW Tour:
  - MVP: 2001
- World League:
  - Top Scorer: 2001
- Italian Beach Soccer:
  - Capocannoniere Serie A: 2006
  - Capocannoniere Coppa Italia: 2007
- Other:
  - Member of the Euro All-Star squad selected to play against Brazil in Tarragona, Spain (2007)

== Managerial career ==
Amarelle transitioned to coaching after retiring from playing in 2013, taking on various roles in beach soccer and traditional football:

- China National Beach Soccer Team
  - Served as head coach
- Trinidad & Tobago National Beach Soccer Team
  - Served as head coach
- CD San Francisco Beach Soccer
  - Appointed head coach and technical director.
- UAE National Beach Soccer Team (2022):
  - Appointed head coach in February 2022.
  - Shortlisted as one of the top three coaches globally at the Beach Soccer Stars gala in Dubai (November 2022).
- Villarreal CF (2022):
  - Assistant coach under Quique Setién, a former teammate from the Spain national beach soccer team, following Setién’s appointment as head coach in October 2022.
- Beijing Guoan (Chinese Super League, 2024–2025):
  - He was appointed as an assistant manager for the team under Quique Setién alongside other Galician coaches Fran Soto and Jaime Paz when Setién took over the club's reign in late 2024. Amarelle was able to leverage his prior experience in the country from his time coaching the China national beach soccer team.
  - On 7 October 2025, Amarelle was announced by the club as the new caretaker manager after Setién's departure. On 21 December 2025, Amarelle announced his departure after 2025 season.
- Shenzhen Juniors (China League One, 2026-):
  - On 23 December 2025, Amarelle was appointed as the head coach of Shenzhen Juniors in 2026 season.

=== Coahcing career honours ===
Beijing Guoan

- Chinese FA Cup: 2025

== Managerial statistics ==
Grass Soccer (Association Football) Managerial Record

Team	Role	From	To	Matches (G)	Wins (W)	Draws (D)	Losses (L)	Goals For (GF)	Goals Against (GA)	Goal Difference (GD)	Win %	Notes / Achievements
Beijing Guoan	Caretaker Manager	7 Oct 2025	21 Dec 2025	9	4	1	4	23	14	+9	44.44%	Won 2025 Chinese FA Cup
Shenzhen Juniors	Head Coach	24 Dec 2025	Present	4	1	1	2	(Not detailed)	(Not detailed)	(Not detailed)	25.00%	AFC Champions League Two (as of early 2026)
Total Grass Soccer				13	5	2	6	—	—	—	≈38.46%	
