= 2009 FIFA Beach Soccer World Cup qualification (UEFA) =

Tournament details
- Host country: Spain
- Dates: 7 June - 14 June 2009
- Teams: 26 (from 1 confederation)
- Venue(s): 1 (in 1 host city)

Final positions
- Champions: Spain (2nd title)
- Runners-up: Russia
- Third place: Switzerland
- Fourth place: Portugal

Tournament statistics
- Matches played: 55
- Goals scored: 476 (8.65 per match)

2009 FIFA Beach Soccer World Cup qualification (UEFA) was a tournament played in Castellón from June 7 to June 14 to determine five teams that qualified to the 2009 FIFA Beach Soccer World Cup in Dubai, United Arab Emirates.

== Group stage ==
=== Group A ===
Team	Pld	W	L	GF	GA	GD	Pts
Spain	3	3	0	22	8	14	9
Romania	3	2	1	13	13	0	6
Czech Republic	3	1	2	14	20	–6	3
Latvia	3	0	3	4	12	–8	0

Czech Republic	2–7	Romania
Latvia	0–3	Spain
Czech Republic	6–2	Latvia
Spain	9–3	Romania
Spain	11–6	Czech Republic
Romania	3–2	Latvia

=== Group B ===
Team	Pld	W	L	GF	GA	GD	Pts
Portugal	3	3	0	25	15	10	8
Azerbaijan	3	1	2	13	13	0	3
Germany	3	1	2	14	16	–2	3
Austria	3	1	2	15	23	–8	3

Germany	7–4	Austria
Azerbaijan	4–6	Portugal
Germany	2–5	Azerbaijan
Portugal	12–6	Austria
Austria	5–4	Azerbaijan
Portugal	7–5(AET)	Germany

=== Group C ===
Team	Pld	W	L	GF	GA	GD	Pts
Russia	2	2	0	20	5	15	6
England	2	1	1	7	9	–2	3
Andorra	2	0	2	3	16	–13	0
Kazakhstan (Note: Withdrawal announced on 7 June due to "force majeure".)	0	0	0	0	0	0	0

England	3–2 (AET)	Andorra
Kazakhstan	Cancelled	Russia
Russia	13–1	Andorra
Kazakhstan	Cancelled	England
Russia	7–4	England
Andorra	Cancelled	Kazakhstan

=== Group D ===
Team	Pld	W	L	GF	GA	GD	Pts
Italy	3	3	0	25	10	15	9
Ukraine	3	2	1	15	11	4	5
Estonia	3	1	2	19	16	3	3
Bulgaria	3	0	3	7	29	–22	0

Ukraine	3–3 (2–1 p.)	Estonia
Bulgaria	2–9	Italy
Italy	9–3	Estonia
Ukraine	7–1	Bulgaria
Italy	7–5	Ukraine
Estonia	13–4	Bulgaria

=== Group E ===
Team	Pld	W	L	GF	GA	GD	Pts
France	2	2	0	14	6	8	6
Turkey	2	1	1	10	14	–4	3
Greece	2	0	2	8	12	–4	0
Slovakia	0	0	0	0	0	0	0

Greece	5–7	Turkey
Slovakia	Cancelled	France
France	9–3	Turkey
Slovakia	Cancelled	Greece
France	5–3	Greece
Turkey	Cancelled	Slovakia

=== Group F ===
Team	Pld	W	L	GF	GA	GD	Pts
Switzerland	3	3	0	17	10	7	9
Netherlands	3	2	1	16	14	2	6
Israel	3	1	2	12	13	–1	3
Hungary	3	0	3	10	18	–8	0

Hungary	6–8	Netherlands
Israel	4–7	Switzerland
Hungary	2–5	Israel
Switzerland	5–4	Netherlands
Switzerland	5–2	Hungary
Netherlands	4–3	Israel

=== Group G ===
Team	Pld	W	L	GF	GA	GD	Pts
Poland	3	3	0	13	7	6	9
Belgium	3	2	1	14	7	7	6
Belarus	3	1	2	7	10	–3	3
Norway	3	0	3	9	19	–10	0

Belgium	2–3	Poland
Norway	3–4	Belarus
Poland	4–2	Belarus
Norway	3–9	Belgium
Poland	6–3	Norway
Belarus	1–3	Belgium

== First knockout round ==
11 June 2009
09:15

Azerbaijan	3 – 1	England

11 June 2009
10:30

Poland	3 – 4 (AET)	Romania

11 June 2009
11:45

Switzerland	7 – 2	Turkey

11 June 2009
13:00

Italy	6 – 5	Belgium

11 June 2009
14:15

Russia	3 – 0	Netherlands

11 June 2009
15:30

Portugal	9 – 0	Estonia

11 June 2009
16:45

France	4 – 3	Ukraine

11 June 2009
18:00

Spain	6 – 2	Israel

== Quarter-finals ==
12 June 2009
14:15

Portugal	5 – 2	Romania

12 June 2009
15:30

Switzerland	5 – 3	Italy

12 June 2009
16:45

Russia	4 – 3	France

12 June 2009
18:00

Spain	6 – 1	Azerbaijan

== 5th place play-off ==
Italy	11 – 4	Azerbaijan

Romania	5 – 7	France

== 5th place ==
Italy	4 – 2	France

== Semi-finals ==
Portugal	2 – 4	Russia

Spain	4 – 2	Switzerland

== 3rd place ==
Portugal	6 – 8	Switzerland

== Final ==
Russia	4 – 4 (12–13 p.)	Spain
