= 2004 Beach Soccer World Championships =

X Beach Soccer World Championships 2004 X Campeonato Mundial de Beach Soccer (in Portuguese)

Tournament details
- Host country: Brazil
- Dates: 29 February – 7 March
- Teams: 12 (from 3 confederations)
- Venue(s): 1 (in 1 host city)

Final positions
- Champions: Brazil (9th title)
- Runners-up: Spain
- Third place: Portugal
- Fourth place: Italy

Tournament statistics
- Matches played: 20
- Goals scored: 156 (7.8 per match)
- Attendance: 81,900 (4,095 per match)
- Top scorer(s): (Portugal) Madjer (12 goals)
- Best player(s): (Brazil) Jorginho
- Best goalkeeper: (Spain) Roberto Valeiro

The 2004 Beach Soccer World Championships was the tenth and final edition of the Beach Soccer World Championships, the most prestigious competition in international beach soccer contested by men's national teams; the following year, the competition was replaced by the second iteration of a world cup in beach soccer, the better known FIFA Beach Soccer World Cup. It was organized by Brazilian sports agency Koch Tavares in cooperation with and under the supervision of Beach Soccer Worldwide (BSWW), the sports governing body.

The tournament took place at Copacabana Beach in Rio de Janeiro, Brazil, specifically at the purpose-built Copacabana Arena which had a capacity of 10,000. The main sponsor was McDonald's.

Brazil successfully defended their title by again beating Spain, in consecutive finals.

== Organisation ==
The format was changed back to how the tournament was played between 1999 and 2001. This meant increasing the number of participants back up to twelve teams and splitting them up into four groups of three nations contested in a round robin format. The top two teams from each group progressed into the quarter-finals from which point on the championship proceeded as a knock-out tournament until the winner was crowned, with an additional third place deciding match.

== Teams ==
=== Qualification ===
European teams gained qualification by finishing in the top four spots of the 2003 Euro Beach Soccer League. South American teams were hand-picked based on recent performances. The other entries received wild-card invites.

Africa, Asia and Oceania were unrepresented.

=== Entrants ===
European Zone (7):

- Spain
- France
- Portugal
- Switzerland^{1}
- Italy^{WC}
- Germany^{WC}
- Belgium^{1,WC}

North American Zone (1):

- United States^{WC}

South American Zone (3):

- Peru
- Uruguay
- Argentina

Hosts:

- Brazil (South America)

Notes:

1. Teams making their debut.
WC. Wild-card entries.

== Draw ==
The teams were split into three pots in reflection of their similar circumstances. The draw to assign one nation from each pot into the four groups took place on January 29 in São Paulo and was conducted by BSWW.

Pot 1 (South America)	Pot 2 (Europe)	Pot 3 (Wild-cards)
Brazil (assigned to A1); Uruguay; Peru; Argentina	Spain; France; Portugal; Switzerland	United States; Italy; Belgium; Germany

== Group stage ==
Matches are listed as local time in Rio de Janeiro, (UTC-3)

=== Group A ===
Pos	Team	Pld	W	W+	L	GF	GA	GD	Pts	Qualification
1	Brazil	2	2	0	0	22	4	+18	6	Advance to knockout stage
2	Switzerland	2	1	0	1	5	12	–7	3	Advance to knockout stage
3	Germany	2	0	0	2	2	13	–11	0	

February 29, 2004
10:00

Brazil	10–2	Germany
Buru; Benjamin; Neném; Camilo; Bruno; Jorginho	Report	dos Santos

Copacabana beach
Attendance: 6 000
Referee: José Luiz da Rosa (Uruguay)

March 1, 2004
17:00

Switzerland	3–0	Germany
Kaspar; Schirinzi; Baumi	Report

Copacabana beach
Attendance: 600
Referee: Lakhdar Benchabane (France)

March 2, 2004

Brazil	12–2	Switzerland
Júnior Negão; Jorginho; Juninho; André; Neném; Benjamin	Report	Meier

Copacabana beach
Attendance: 6 500
Referee: Carlos Robles (Chile)

=== Group B ===
Pos	Team	Pld	W	W+	L	GF	GA	GD	Pts	Qualification
1	Italy	2	1	1	0	4	3	+1	5	Advance to knockout stage
2	France	2	1	0	1	10	7	+3	3	Advance to knockout stage
3	Peru	2	0	0	2	5	9	–4	0	

February 29, 2004
08:45

Italy	3–2	France
Galli; Agosto; Fruzzetti	Report	Cardoso; Ottavy

Copacabana beach
Attendance: 6 000
Referee: Carlos Robles (Chile)

March 1, 2004

Italy	1–1 (a.e.t.)	Peru
Nicoletta	Report	Zamora
Penalties
Fruzzetti (penalty scored); Agosto (penalty scored)	2–1	(penalty scored) Maruy; (penalty missed) Zamora

Copacabana beach
Attendance: 600
Referee: João Alberto Duarte (Brazil)

March 2, 2004
17:00

France	8–4	Peru
Samoun; Castro; Rodriguez; Coullomb; Cantona; Deleglise	Report	Leon; Maruy; Drago; Buchanan

Copacabana beach
Attendance: 5 000
Referee: José Luiz Rosa (Uruguay)

=== Group C ===
Pos	Team	Pld	W	W+	L	GF	GA	GD	Pts	Qualification
1	Portugal	2	2	0	0	17	2	+15	6	Advance to knockout stage
2	Uruguay	2	1	0	1	7	9	–2	3	Advance to knockout stage
3	Belgium	2	0	0	2	5	18	–13	0	

February 29, 2004
18:00

Uruguay	6–4	Belgium
Seba; Martín; Nico; Richard; Jorge; Pico	Report	Soudan; Belme; Crits

Copacabana beach
Attendance: 500
Referee: Antonio Buaiz (Brazil)

March 1, 2004

Portugal	12–1	Belgium
Madjer; Hernani; Belchior; Ricardo Loja; Alan	Report	Meex

Copacabana beach
Attendance: 600
Referee: Massimo Magrini (Italy)

March 2, 2004

Portugal	5–1	Uruguay
Victor; Belchior; Alan; Madjer	Report	Nico

Copacabana beach
Attendance: 2 500
Referee: Lakhdar Benchabane (France)

=== Group D ===
Pos	Team	Pld	W	W+	L	GF	GA	GD	Pts	Qualification
1	Spain	2	2	0	0	10	2	+8	6	Advance to knockout stage
2	Argentina	2	1	0	1	6	8	–2	3	Advance to knockout stage
3	United States	2	0	0	2	2	8	–6	0	

February 29, 2004

Spain	4–0	United States
Eloy; Nico; Sergio	Report

Copacabana beach
Attendance: 500
Referee: Alberto Magno (Brazil)

March 1, 2004

Argentina	4–2	United States
E. Hilaire; Petrasso; Casado; Pajaro	Report	Alix; Francis

Copacabana beach
Attendance: 600
Referee: João Alberto Duarte (Brazil)

March 2, 2004

Spain	6–2	Argentina
Bustillo; David; Amarelle; Nico	Report	S. Hilaire; Petrasso

Copacabana beach
Attendance: 2 000
Referee: Alberto Magno (Brazil)

== Knockout stage ==
March 3 and 5 were allocated as rest days.

Quarter finals
4 March
Spain	5
Switzerland	4
4 March
Italy	4
Uruguay	1
4 March
Portugal	6
France	3
4 March
Brazil	7
Argentina	2

Semi-finals
6 March
Spain	3
Italy	1
6 March
Portugal	2
Brazil	7

Final
7 March
Spain	4
Brazil	6
Third place play-off
7 March
Italy	1
Portugal	5

=== Quarter finals ===
March 4, 2004
17:00

Spain	5–4	Switzerland
Amarelle; David	Report	Schirinzi; Leu; Baumi; Mo

Copacabana beach
Attendance: 2 000
Referee: João Alberto Duarte (Brazil)

March 4, 2004

Italy	4–1	Uruguay
Fruzzetti; Galli	Report	Martín

Copacabana beach
Attendance: 3 500
Referee: Lakhdar Benchabane (France)

March 4, 2004

Portugal	6–3	France
Alan; Victor; Madjer	Report	Samoun; Ottavy; Cardoso

Copacabana beach
Attendance: 5 500
Referee: José Luiz Rosa (Uruguay)

March 4, 2004

Brazil	7–2	Argentina
Jorginho; Junior Negão; Benjamin	Report	Civale; Andrade

Copacabana beach
Attendance: 7 000
Referee: João Carlos Almeida (Portugal)

=== Semi-finals ===
March 6, 2004
08:45

Spain	3–1	Italy
Nico; Amarelle; Eloy	Report	Fruzzetti

Copacabana beach
Attendance: 6 000
Referee: Antonio Buaiz (Brazil)

March 6, 2004
10:00

Brazil	7–2	Portugal
Benjamin; Buru; Jorginho	Report	Madjer

Copacabana beach
Attendance: 7 500
Referee: José Luiz Rosa (Uruguay)

=== Third place play-off ===
March 7, 2004
08:45

Portugal	5–1	Italy
Madjer; Ricardo Loja; Marinho; Belchior	Report	Pasquali

Copacabana beach
Attendance: 9 000
Referee: João Alberto (Brazil)

=== Final ===
March 7, 2004
10:00

Brazil	6–4	Spain
Benjamin; Junior Negão; Neném; Buru; Bruno	Report	Eloy; Roberto; Amarelle; Sergio

Copacabana beach
Attendance: 10 000
Referee: Carlos Robles (Chile)

== Winners ==
2004 Beach Soccer World Championships
champions

Brazil
Ninth title

== Awards ==
Top scorer
(Portugal) Madjer
12 goals
Best player
(Brazil) Jorginho
Best goalkeeper
(Spain) Roberto Valeiro
Rookie of the year
(Italy) Alessandro Giovinazzo (GK)

== Top goalscorers ==
12 goals

- (Portugal) Madjer

10 goals

- (Brazil) Benjamin

7 goals

- (Portugal) Alan
- (Brazil) Jorginho
- (Spain) Amarelle

6 goals

- (Brazil) Junior Negão

5 goals

- (Brazil) Buru
- (Brazil) Neném
- (Italy) Fruzzetti

4 goals

- (Portugal) Belchior
- (Brazil) Juninho
- (Spain) Nico

3 goals

- (Spain) Eloy
- (Spain) David

2 goals

- (France) Rodriguez
- (Switzerland) Meier
- (Spain) Bustillo
- (Uruguay) Nico
- (Italy) Galli
- (Germany) dos Santos
- (France) Cardoso
- (France) Ottavy
- (France) Samoun
- (Switzerland) Baumi
- (Argentina) Petrasso
- (Belgium) Belme
- (Uruguay) Martin
- (Portugal) Victor
- (Argentina) Camilo
- (Portugal) Ricardo Loja
- (France) Cantona
- (Switzerland) Schirinzi
- (Spain) Sergio
- (Brazil) Bruno
- (Portugal) Hernani

32 others scored 1 goal each

== Final standings ==
Pos	Grp	Team	Pld	W	W+	L	GF	GA	GD	Pts	Final result
1	A	Brazil	5	5	0	0	42	12	+30	15	Champions
2	D	Spain	5	4	0	1	22	13	+9	12	Runners-up
3	C	Portugal	5	4	0	1	30	13	+17	12	Third place
4	B	Italy	5	2	1	2	10	12	−2	8	Fourth place
5	B	France	3	1	0	2	13	13	0	3	Eliminated in the quarter finals
6	C	Uruguay	3	1	0	2	8	13	−5	3	Eliminated in the quarter finals
7	D	Argentina	3	1	0	2	8	15	−7	3	Eliminated in the quarter finals
8	A	Switzerland	3	1	0	2	9	17	−8	3	Eliminated in the quarter finals
9	B	Peru	2	0	0	2	5	9	−4	0	Eliminated in the group stage
10	D	United States	2	0	0	2	2	8	−6	0	Eliminated in the group stage
11	A	Germany	2	0	0	2	2	13	−11	0	Eliminated in the group stage
12	C	Belgium	2	0	0	2	5	18	−13	0	Eliminated in the group stage

== Sources ==
- RSSSF
- roonba
- BSWW
- Scorers
- Awards
