= England Beach Soccer =

English governing body for beach soccer

England Beach Soccer Association Ltd, branded as England Beach Soccer, is a company that functions as the governing body of the sport of beach soccer in England. It is independent of The Football Association, which is responsible for association football and futsal.

England Beach Soccer controls the men's England national beach soccer team, and the England women's national beach soccer team.
