= 2009 FIFA Beach Soccer World Cup =

كأس العالم لكرة القدم الشاطئية 2009

Tournament details
- Host country: United Arab Emirates
- City: Dubai
- Dates: 16–22 November
- Teams: 16 (from 6 confederations)
- Venue: 2 (in 1 host city)

Final positions
- Champions: Brazil (4th title)
- Runners-up: Switzerland
- Third place: Portugal
- Fourth place: Uruguay

Tournament statistics
- Matches played: 32
- Goals scored: 284 (8.88 per match)
- Attendance: 97,500 (3,047 per match)
- Top scorer(s): (Switzerland) Dejan Stankovic (16 goals)
- Best player: (Switzerland) Dejan Stankovic
- Best goalkeeper: (Brazil) Mao
- Fair play award: Japan; Russia

The 2009 FIFA Beach Soccer World Cup was the fifth edition of the FIFA Beach Soccer World Cup, governed by FIFA. Overall, this was the 15th edition of a world cup in beach soccer since the establishment of the Beach Soccer World Championships which ran from 1995 to 2004 but was not governed by FIFA. It took place in Dubai, the United Arab Emirates between 16 November and 22 November 2009. It was the second tournament to take place outside Brazil, first to be played in Asia, and the last tournament to take place on an annual basis.

The winners of the tournament were Brazil, who won their fourth consecutive FIFA Beach Soccer World Cup title and their thirteenth title overall.

== Qualifying rounds ==
=== African Zone ===
The qualifiers to determine the two African nations who would play in the World Cup took place in Durban, South Africa for the fourth year running between 1 July and 5 July. Nine nations took part in the competition, which eventually saw Nigeria claim their second title, qualifying for the first time since 2007, with the Ivory Coast finishing in second place, qualifying for the first time.

=== Asian Zone ===
The Asian qualifiers were held in Dubai, the United Arab Emirates, from 7 to 11 November. With only seven teams attending the qualifiers, the United Arab Emirates stepped in as the eighth side to even the two groups in the group stage. Japan qualified for the fourth time after beating Bahrain in the final of the championship, who qualified for their second World Cup.

=== European Zone ===
UEFA held the second European tournament dedicated to World Cup qualification in Castellón, Spain, between, 7 June and 14 June. Hosts Spain won the championship, with Russia finishing second. Switzerland beat Portugal in the third place play off, but regardless of the result, both teams qualified to the World Cup, along with the finalists. Italy beat France in the fifth place play off to qualify as the fifth European nation.

=== North, Central American and Caribbean Zone ===
The North, Central America and the Caribbean Zone qualifiers took place between 17 June and 21 June, after being postponed in May due to the 2009 swine flu pandemic, in Puerto Vallarta, Mexico, for the second year running. El Salvador and Costa Rica were the two finalists, meaning they both qualified for the World Cup; El Salvador for the second time and Costa Rica for the first. El Salvador defeated Costa Rica in the final to win their first title.

=== Oceanian Zone ===
The qualifiers to decide the one nation from Oceania that would be competing in the World Cup took place in Moorea, Tahiti, between 27 July and 31 July. Despite Vanuatu winning the group stage, they lost in the final to the Solomon Islands, who claimed their third title and qualification for a fourth year in a row.

=== South American Zone ===
The South American qualifiers took place between 11 March and 15 March, in the Uruguayan capital, Montevideo. Brazil and hosts Uruguay were the two finalists, meaning they both qualified for the World Cup. Brazil defeated Uruguay in the final to win the title. Argentina and Ecuador were knocked out in the semi-finals and played each other in the third place play off. Argentina beat Ecuador to claim the third berth at the World Cup.

=== Host ===
United Arab Emirates qualified automatically as the hosts.

== Teams ==
These are the teams that qualified for the World Cup:

Asian zone:

- Bahrain
- Japan
- United Arab Emirates (hosts)

African zone:

- Ivory Coast (first appearance)
- Nigeria

European zone:

- Italy
- Russia
- Portugal
- Spain
- Switzerland

North, Central American and Caribbean zone:

- Costa Rica (first appearance)
- El Salvador

Oceanian zone:

- Solomon Islands

South American zone:

- Argentina
- Brazil
- Uruguay

== Venues ==
Two venues were used in the city of Dubai, United Arab Emirates at Jumeirah Beach during the World Cup with matches split between them as follows.

Dubai (1)	2009 FIFA Beach Soccer World Cup (United Arab Emirates)	Dubai (2)
Jumeirah Beach (Main Pitch)	2009 FIFA Beach Soccer World Cup (United Arab Emirates)	Jumeirah Beach (Pitch 2)
25°21′N 55°25′E	2009 FIFA Beach Soccer World Cup (United Arab Emirates)	25°21′N 55°25′E
Capacity: 5,700	2009 FIFA Beach Soccer World Cup (United Arab Emirates)	Capacity: 1,200

== Groups ==
The 16 teams present at the finals in Brazil were split into 4 groups of 4 teams. Each team played the other 3 teams in its group in a round-robin format, with the top two teams advancing to the quarter finals. The quarter finals, semi finals and the final itself was played in the form of a knockout tournament.

All matches are listed as local time in Dubai, (UTC+4)

=== Group A ===
Team	Pld	W	W+	L	GF	GA	GD	Pts
Uruguay	3	2	0	1	12	8	+4	6
Portugal	3	2	0	1	14	8	+6	6
United Arab Emirates	3	1	0	2	12	12	0	3
Solomon Islands	3	1	0	2	9	19	-10	3

- Uruguay and Portugal are ranked based on their head-to-head result.
16 November 2009
13:30

Uruguay	6–7	Solomon Islands
Ricar 3', 32'; Martin 10', 29'; Pampero 29'; Fabian 31'	Report	6', 15', 15' Laua; 8' Hosea; 9' Makaa; 11' Wale; 22' Omo

Jumeirah Beach (Pitch 2)
Attendance: 150
Referee: Fabio Polito (Italy)

16 November 2009
19:30

United Arab Emirates	5–7	Portugal
Al Mesaabi 1'; Sadeqi 6'; Alabadla 8'; K. Albalooshi 25'; I. Albalooshi 28'	Report	20' Ze Maria; 24' Belchior; 27', 31', 33' Madjer; 27' Alan; 28' Bilro

Jumeirah Beach (Main Pitch)
Attendance: 5,000
Referee: Serdar Akcer (Turkey)

17 November 2009
15:00

Portugal	1–2	Uruguay
Belchior 18'	Report	7', 35' Coco

Jumeirah Beach (Main Pitch)
Attendance: 900
Referee: Tasuku Onodera (Japan)

17 November 2009
19:30

Solomon Islands	1–7	United Arab Emirates
Hale 1'	Report	1', 6' K. Albalooshi; 13' I. Albalooshi; 22' Alabadla; 24' Al Mesaabi; 30' Sadeqi; 31' Ranjbar

Jumeirah Beach (Main Pitch)
Attendance: 4,000
Referee: Sylvain Palhies (France)

18 November 2009
16:30

Portugal	6–1	Solomon Islands
Madjer 1', 6'; Ze Maria 10'; Belchior 29', 32'; Bruno Novo 36'	Report	12' Hosea

Jumeirah Beach (Main Pitch)
Attendance: 2,000
Referee: Afgan Hamzayev (Azerbaijan)

18 November 2009
19:30

United Arab Emirates	0–4	Uruguay
	Report	2', 34' Ricar; 10' Pampero; 28' Martin

Jumeirah Beach (Main Pitch)
Attendance: 6,000
Referee: Alexander Berezkin (Russia)

=== Group B ===
Team	Pld	W	W+	L	GF	GA	GD	Pts
Japan	3	2	1	0	15	9	+6	8
Spain	3	2	0	1	21	14	+7	6
Ivory Coast	3	1	0	2	15	18	-3	3
El Salvador	3	0	0	3	11	21	-10	0

16 November 2009
15:00

Ivory Coast	7–6	El Salvador
Enounou 1', 21', 26', 27', 36'; Daniel 12'; Aka 23'	Report	7', 29' Hernández; 7' Ruiz; 8' Torres; 11', 11' Velásquez

Jumeirah Beach (Pitch 2)
Attendance: 100
Referee: Istvan Meszaros (Hungary)

16 November 2009
18:00

Spain	5–5 (a.e.t.)	Japan
Oda 7' (o.g.); Juanma 18'; Javier Torres 22'; Nico 24'; Wayo 39'	Report	14' Toma; 15', 26' Tabata; 16' Higa; 38' Oda
Penalties
Nico (penalty scored); Juanma (penalty scored); Kuman (penalty missed)	2–3	(penalty scored) Yamauchi; (penalty scored) Makino; (penalty scored) Higa

Jumeirah Beach (Main Pitch)
Attendance: 3,500
Referee: Javier Bentancor (Uruguay)

17 November 2009
13:30

Japan	3–2	Ivory Coast
Makino 11'; Toma 26'; Tabata 32'	Report	10' Aka; 17' Ouattara

Jumeirah Beach (Pitch 2)
Attendance: 200
Referee: Sergejus Slyva (Lithuania)

17 November 2009
16:30

El Salvador	3–7	Spain
Ruiz 7', 14'; Garay 22'	Report	7' Amarelle; 14', 31' J. Torres; 15' Nico; 22' C. Torres; 26' Wayo; 34' Millos

Jumeirah Beach (Main Pitch)
Attendance: 1,500
Referee: Juan Rodríguez (Argentina)

18 November 2009
13:30

Spain	9–6	Ivory Coast
Wayo 3'; Amarelle 11', 14'; Kuman 17'; Juanma 17', 28'; C.Torres 19'; Coulibaly 25' (o.g.); Nico 28'	Report	4', 25' Kabletchi; 10' Diomande; 10', 17', 36' Enounou

Jumeirah Beach (Main Pitch)
Attendance: 600
Referee: Rene de la Rosa (Chile)

18 November 2009
13:30

Japan	7–2	El Salvador
Kawaharazuka 4'; Toma 6'; Maezono 7', 13'; Makino 8'; Oda 22'; Tabata 27'	Report	22' Hernández; 36' Torres

Jumeirah Beach (Pitch 2)
Attendance: 350
Referee: Abbas Alshammari (Kuwait)

=== Group C ===
Team	Pld	W	W+	L	GF	GA	GD	Pts
Russia	3	2	0	1	11	5	+6	6
Italy	3	1	1	1	7	6	+1	5
Argentina	3	1	1	1	11	6	+5	5
Costa Rica	3	0	0	3	2	14	-12	0

- Italy and Argentina are ranked based on their head-to-head result.
16 November 2009
15:00

Argentina	2–3 (a.e.t.)	Italy
E. Hilaire 15'; S. Hilaire 20'	Report	19' Palmacci; 25' Pasquali; 37' Carotenuto

Jumeirah Beach (Main Pitch)
Attendance: 2,500
Referee: Faisal Sallam (United Arab Emirates)

16 November 2009
16:30

Russia	5–1	Costa Rica
Krasheninnikov 6'; Shkarin 10'; Leonov 13'; Shishin 17'; Shakhmelyan 18'	Report	29' Cameron

Jumeirah Beach (Main Pitch)
Attendance: 2,500
Referee: Rene de la Rosa (Chile)

17 November 2009
13:30

Costa Rica	0–6	Argentina
	Report	14', 28' F. Hilaire; 15' E. Hilaire; 19', 36' Dallera; 30' Minici

Jumeirah Beach (Main Pitch)
Attendance: 550
Referee: Abbas Alshammari (Kuwait)

17 November 2009
18:00

Italy	1–3	Russia
Palmacci 2'	Report	25' Leonov; 28' Shkarin; 28' Krasheninnikov

Jumeirah Beach (Main Pitch)
Attendance: 3,000
Referee: Ruben Eiriz (Spain)

18 November 2009
15:00

Costa Rica	1–3	Italy
Sterling 9'	Report	8' Feudi; 10' Carotenuto; 35' Palmacci

Jumeirah Beach (Pitch 2)
Attendance: 200
Referee: Istvan Meszaros (Hungary)

18 November 2009
15:00

Russia	3–3 (a.e.t.)	Argentina
Shaykov 3', 13'; Shakhmelyan 5'	Report	3' Franceschini; 26', 36' F. Hilaire
Penalties
Leonov (penalty scored); Shishin (penalty scored); Shkarin (penalty scored); Makarov (penalty missed)	3–4	(penalty scored) E. Hilaire; (penalty scored) Leguizamon; (penalty scored) Galvan; (penalty scored) Minici

Jumeirah Beach (Main Pitch)
Attendance: 2,500
Referee: Serdar Akcer (Turkey)

=== Group D ===
Team	Pld	W	W+	L	GF	GA	GD	Pts
Brazil	3	3	0	0	23	8	+15	9
Switzerland	3	2	0	1	15	11	+4	6
Nigeria	3	1	0	2	16	21	–5	3
Bahrain	3	0	0	3	9	23	–14	0

16 November 2009
13:30

Switzerland	6–5	Bahrain
Stanković 7', 32'; Schirinzi 11'; Spaccarotella 12', 35'; Jäggy 34'	Report	2', 16', 34' Salem; 17' Abdulla; 27' Mubarak

Jumeirah Beach (Main Pitch)
Attendance: 2,000
Referee: Erick Chavarria (Costa Rica)

16 November 2009
21:00

Brazil	11–5	Nigeria
Sidney 1', 23'; Bueno 2'; Benjamin 7'; André 9'; Daniel 12', 26'; Bruno 15', 26', 27'; Betinho 28'	Report	1', 30' Olawale; 5', 30' Tale; 35' Ibenegbu

Jumeirah Beach (Main Pitch)
Attendance: 2,500
Referee: Petro Ivanov (Ukraine)

17 November 2009
15:00

Nigeria	2–7	Switzerland
Olawale 14'; Abu 17'	Report	1' Spaccarotella; 1', 7', 14', 16' Stanković; 3', 7' Jaeggy

Jumeirah Beach (Pitch 2)
Attendance: 350
Referee: Rene de la Rosa (Chile)

17 November 2009
21:00

Bahrain	1–8	Brazil
Almughawi 36'	Report	1', 3', 4', 29' Buru; 10' Bruno; 22' Daniel Souza; 31' Andre; 36' Daniel

Jumeirah Beach (Main Pitch)
Attendance: 4,000
Referee: Alexander Berezkin (Russia)

18 November 2009
18:00

Nigeria	9–3	Bahrain
Ezimorah 4'; Tale 8'; Agu 8', 9'; Ibenegbu 12', 21'; Abu 16'; Usman 30'; Okemmiri 34'	Report	6', 35' Salem; 22' Aldoseri

Jumeirah Beach (Main Pitch)
Attendance: 3,500
Referee: Geng Zhiwei (China)

18 November 2009
21:00

Brazil	4–2	Switzerland
Benjamin 10', 31'; Andre 29'; Bruno 35'	Report	1', 26' Stanković

Jumeirah Beach (Main Pitch)
Attendance: 6,000
Referee: Faisal Sallam (United Arab Emirates)

== Knockout stage ==
Quarter-finals
20 November 2009
Uruguay	3
Spain	2
20 November 2009
Russia	2
Switzerland	4
20 November 2009
Japan	1
Portugal	2
20 November 2009
Brazil	6
Italy	4

Semi-finals
21 November 2009
Uruguay	4
Switzerland	7
21 November 2009
Portugal	2
Brazil	8

Final
22 November 2009
Switzerland	5
Brazil	10
Third place
22 November 2009
Uruguay	7
Portugal	14

=== Quarter finals ===
20 November 2009
16:30

Japan	1–2	Portugal
Uehara 26'	Report	17' Madjer; 36' Belchior

Jumeirah Beach (Main Pitch)
Attendance: 5,000
Referee: Javier Bentancor (Uruguay)

20 November 2009
18:00

Russia	2–4	Switzerland
Makarov 13'; Shishin 23'	Report	4', 13', 24' Stanković; 33' Meier

Jumeirah Beach (Main Pitch)
Attendance: 6,000
Referee: Ivo De Moraes (Brazil)

20 November 2009
19:30

Brazil	6–4	Italy
Sidney 6'; André 11', 17', 31'; Bruno 25'; Buru 36'	Report	17', 26', 26', 31' Pasquali

Jumeirah Beach (Main Pitch)
Attendance: 6,000
Referee: Ruben Eiriz (Spain)

20 November 2009
21:00

Uruguay	3–2 (a.e.t)	Spain
Martin 18'; Ricar 27', 37'	Report	Amarelle 28'; C.Torres 32'

Jumeirah Beach (Main Pitch)
Attendance: 6,000
Referee: Tasuku Onodera (Japan)

=== Semi-finals ===
21 November 2009
19:30

Portugal	2–8	Brazil
Bilro 13'; Alan 34'	Report	6' Sidney; 8' Benjamin; 12', 12' Bruno; 19' Daniel; 24' Betinho; 26' Buru; 34' Daniel Souza

Jumeirah Beach (Main Pitch)
Attendance: 6,000
Referee: Tasuku Onodera (Japan)

21 November 2009
21:00

Switzerland	7–4	Uruguay
Stanković 3', 12', 26', 29'; Spaccarotella 20'; Leu 30'; Rodrigues 36'	Report	24', 31' Martin; 27' Coco; 36' Matias

Jumeirah Beach (Main Pitch)
Attendance: 5,000
Referee: Sergejus Slyva (Lithuania)

=== Third-place play-off ===
22 November 2009
19:30

Portugal	14–7	Uruguay
Torres 3', 5', 26'; Madjer 6', 13', 22', 24', 30', 36', 36'; Jose Maria 11', 21'; Miguel 16' (o.g.); Coimbra 20'	Report	6' Coco; 13' Pampero; 18' Matias; 22' (o.g.) Alan; 24' Ricar; 26' Fabian; 32' Oli

Jumeirah Beach (Main Pitch)
Attendance: 6,000
Referee: Faisal Sallam (United Arab Emirates)

=== Final ===
22 November 2009
21:00

Brazil	10–5	Switzerland
André 6', 23'; Betinho 8', 23'; Buru 8', 15'; Daniel 12'; Benjamin 18'; Sidney 31'; Bueno 36'	Report	9' Jaeggy; 30' Meier; 31' Rodrigues; 34' Schirinzi; 36' Stanković

Jumeirah Beach (Main Pitch)
Attendance: 6,000
Referee: Ruben Eiriz (Spain) 2nd Referee Javier Bentancor (Uruguay) 3rd Referee Serdar Akçer (Turkey)

== Winners ==
2009 FIFA Beach Soccer World Cup
Champions

Brazil
Fourth title
13th world title

== Awards ==
Golden Ball	Silver Ball	Bronze Ball
(Switzerland) Dejan Stankovic	(Portugal) Madjer	(Brazil) Benjamin
Golden Shoe	Silver Shoe	Bronze Shoe
(Switzerland) Dejan Stankovic	(Portugal) Madjer	(Brazil) Buru
16 goals	13 goals	8 goals
Golden Glove
(Brazil) Mao
FIFA Fair Play Award
Japan; Russia

== Top scorers ==
There were 284 goals scored in 32 matches, for an average of 8.88 goals per match.

16 goals

- (Switzerland) Dejan Stankovic

13 goals

- (Portugal) Madjer

8 goals

- (Ivory Coast) Ludovic Ehounou
- (Brazil) André
- (Brazil) Buru

7 goals

- (Uruguay) Ricar

6 goals

- (Brazil) Bruno

5 goals

- (Bahrain) Rashed Salem
- (Brazil) Benjamin
- (Brazil) Daniel
- (Brazil) Sidney
- (Portugal) Belchior
- (Italy) Roberto Pasquali

4 goals

- (Argentina) Federico Hilaire
- (Brazil) Betinho
- (Japan) Teruki Tabata
- (Portugal) Ze Maria
- (Spain) Amarelle
- (Switzerland) Moritz Jäggy
- (Switzerland) Sandro Spaccarotella
- (Uruguay) Martin

3 goals

- (Ivory Coast) Bartholomew Ibenegbu
- (El Salvador) Tomas Hernandez
- (El Salvador) Agustin Ruiz
- (Italy) Paolo Palmacci
- (Japan) Masahito Toma
- (Nigeria) Isiaka Olawale
- (Nigeria) Victor Tale
- (Portugal) Torres
- (Solomon Islands) Robert Laua
- (Spain) Christian Torres
- (Spain) Javier Torres
- (Spain) Juanma
- (Spain) Nico
- (Spain) Wayo
- (United Arab Emirates) Karim Albalooshi
- (Uruguay) Pampero

2 goals

- (Argentina) Augustin Dallera
- (Argentina) Ezequiel Hilaire
- (Brazil) Bueno
- (Brazil) Daniel Souza
- (Ivory Coast) Frederic Aka
- (Ivory Coast) Didier Kabletchi
- (El Salvador) Walter Torres
- (El Salvador) Frank Velasquez
- (Italy) Pasquale Carotenuto
- (Japan) Masakiyo Maezono
- (Japan) Shinji Makino
- (Japan) Hirofumi Oda
- (Nigeria) Azeez Abu
- (Nigeria) Gabriel Agu
- (Nigeria) Victor Tale
- (Portugal) Alan
- (Portugal) Bilro
- (Portugal) Ze Maria
- (Russia) Yury Krasheninnikov
- (Russia) Ilya Leonov
- (Russia) Rustam Shakhmelyan
- (Russia) Dmitry Shishin
- (Russia) Anton Shkarin
- (Russia) Egor Shaykov
- (Solomon Islands) Gibson Hosea
- (Spain) Christian Torres
- (Switzerland) Stephan Maier
- (Switzerland) Michael Rodrigues
- (Switzerland) Angelo Schirinzi
- (Uruguay) Coco
- (Uruguay) Fabian
- (Uruguay) Matias
- (United Arab Emirates) Bakhit Alabadla
- (United Arab Emirates) Ibrahim Albalooshi
- (United Arab Emirates) Rami Al Mesaabi
- (United Arab Emirates) Qambar Sadeqi

1 goal

- 32 others scored 1 goal each

1 own goal

- (Ivory Coast) Coulibaly (against Spain)
- (Japan) Hirofumi Oda (against Spain)
- (Portugal) Alan (against Uruguay)
- (Uruguay) Miguel (against Portugal)

== Final standings ==
Position	Team
1	Brazil
2	Switzerland
3	Portugal
4	Uruguay
5	Japan
6	Spain
7	Russia
8	Italy
9	Argentina
10	United Arab Emirates
11	Ivory Coast
12	Nigeria
13	Solomon Islands
14	El Salvador
15	Costa Rica
16	Bahrain
