= Belgium national beach soccer team =

Belgium
- Association: Belgian Football Association
- Confederation: UEFA (Europe)
- Head coach: Yves Soudan
- FIFA code: BEL
- BSWW ranking: 60 ▲3 (1 June 2026)
First colours
Second colours

The Belgium national beach soccer team represents Belgium in international beach soccer competitions and is controlled by the KBVB, the governing body for football in Belgium.

== Current squad ==
Correct as of February 2011

Note: Flags indicate national team as defined under FIFA eligibility rules; some limited exceptions apply. Players may hold more than one non-FIFA nationality.

No.	Pos.	Nation	Player
—	DF		Kevin Demeu
—	FW		George Zaboukis
—	FW		Jerome Patris

No.	Pos.	Nation	Player
—	GK		Yannick Rummens
—	FW		Rubinelson Monteiro F. Ferreira
—			Karim Chabaï

== Current staff ==
- Coach: Yves Soudan
- Assistant Manager: Philippe Vande Walle

== Achievements ==
- FIFA Beach Soccer World Cup Best: Twelfth place
  - 2004
- FIFA Beach Soccer World Cup qualification (UEFA) Best: Round of 16
  - 2009
