= Muha =

Muha may refer to:

- Muha (surname)
- Muha (commune), Bujumbura Mairie Province, Burundi
- Muha Vas, a village in Slovenia
- José Martí International Airport (ICAO code: MUHA)

== See also ==
- Mucha
- Mukha (disambiguation)
