= Robertsganj Lok Sabha constituency =

Constituency of the Indian parliament in Uttar Pradesh

Coordinates: 24.68°N 83.08°E

Robertsganj UP-80
- Lok Sabha constituency
- Interactive Map Outlining Robertsganj Lok Sabha constituency

Constituency details
- Country: India
- Region: North India
- State: Uttar Pradesh
- Assembly constituencies: Chakia; Ghorawal; Robertsganj; Obra; Duddhi
- Established: 1952
- Reservation: SC

Member of Parliament
- 18th Lok Sabha
- Incumbent Chhotelal Kharwar
- Party: Samajwadi Party
- Elected year: 2024

Robertsganj is a Lok Sabha parliamentary constituency in Uttar Pradesh.

== Assembly segments ==
No	Name	District	Member	Party	2024 Lead
383	Chakia (SC)	Chandauli	Kailash Kharvar	BJP	SP
400	Ghorawal	Sonbhadra	Anil Kumar Maurya	BJP	SP
401	Robertsganj	Sonbhadra	Bhupesh Chaubey	BJP	SP
402	Obra (ST)	Sonbhadra	Sanjeev Gond	BJP	SP
403	Duddhi (ST)	Sonbhadra	Vacant	Vacant	SP

== Members of Parliament ==
Year	Member	Party
1962	Ram Swarup	Indian National Congress
1967	Ram Swarup	Indian National Congress
1971	Ram Swarup	Indian National Congress
1977	Shiv Sampati Ram	Janata Party
1980	Ram Pyare Panika	Indian National Congress
1984	Ram Pyare Panika	Indian National Congress
1989	Subedar Prasad	Bharatiya Janata Party
1991	Ram Nihor Rai	Janata Dal
1996	Ram Shakal	Bharatiya Janata Party
1998	Ram Shakal	Bharatiya Janata Party
1999	Ram Shakal	Bharatiya Janata Party
2004	Lal Chandra Kol	Bahujan Samaj Party
2007^	Bhai Lal	Samajwadi Party
2009	Pakaudi Lal Kol	Samajwadi Party
2014	Chhotelal Kharwar	Bharatiya Janata Party
2019	Pakaudi Lal Kol	Apna Dal
2024	Chhotelal Kharwar	Samajwadi Party

^By Poll

== Election results ==
=== 2024 ===
2024 Indian general elections: Robertsganj
Party	Candidate	Votes	%	±%
SP	Chhotelal Kharwar	465,848	46.14	▲6.32
AD(S)	Rinki Kol	336,614	33.34	▼11.98
BSP	Dhaneshwar Gautam	118,778	11.77	▲11.77
NOTA	None of the Above	19,032	1.89	▼0.25
Majority		129,234	12.80	▲7.30
Turnout		1,009,545	56.74	▼0.63
SP gain from AD(S)		Swing		

=== 2019 ===
2019 Indian general elections: Robertsganj
Party	Candidate	Votes	%	±%
AD(S)	Pakaudi Lal Kol	447,914	45.32	New
SP	Bhai Lal	3,93,578	39.82	▲24.37
INC	Bhagwati Prasad Chaudhary	35,269	3.57	▼6.13
NOTA	None of the Above	21,118	2.14	▲0.05
Majority		54,336	5.50	▼16.00
Turnout		9,88,804	57.37	▲3.32
AD(S) gain from BJP		Swing		

=== 2014 ===
2014 Indian general elections: Robertsganj
Party	Candidate	Votes	%	±%
BJP	Chhotelal	378,211	42.69	▲25.15
BSP	Sharada Prasad	1,87,725	21.19	▼6.73
SP	Pakaudi Lal Kol	1,35,966	15.35	▼21.01
INC	Bhagwati Prasad Chaudhary	86,235	9.73	▲0.36
CPI	Ashok Kumar Kannaoujiya	24,363	2.75	N/A
NOTA	None of the Above	18,489	2.09	N/A
Majority		1,90,486	21.50	▲12.61
Turnout		8,85,876	54.05	▲4.75
BJP gain from SP		Swing		

=== 2009 ===
2009 Indian general elections: Robertsganj
Party	Candidate	Votes	%	±%
SP	Pakaudi Lal Kol	216,478	36.36	▲11.64
BSP	Ram Chandra Tyagi	1,66,219	27.92	▲1.77
BJP	Ram Shakal	1,04,411	17.54	▼5.53
INC	Ram Adhar Joseph	55,809	9.37	▲0.28
Independent	Rambriksha	15,936	2.68	N/A
PDFO	Gulab	9,951	1.67	N/A
JPS	Chandra Shekhar	8,439	1.42	N/A
AD(K)	Ramesh Kumar	8,271	1.39	N/A
Majority		50,259	8.44	
Turnout		5,98,805	49.30	
SP gain from BSP		Swing		

== See also ==
- Robertsganj
- List of constituencies of the Lok Sabha
