= Rahul Prakash =

Indian politician

Rahul Prakash Kol

MLA of Uttar Pradesh Legislative Assembly
- In office 2017–2023
- Succeeded by: Rinki Kol
- Constituency: Chhanbey

Personal details
- Born: 4 August 1983 Patehara, Uttar Pradesh, India
- Died: 2 February 2023 (aged 39) Mumbai, Maharashtra, India
- Party: Apna Dal (Sonelal)(2017-2023)
- Other political affiliations: National Democratic Alliance (2017–2023)
- Spouse: Rinki Kol
- Parent: Pakaudi Lal Kol (father)
- Occupation: Politician
- Profession: Agriculturist and Social Worker

Rahul Prakash Kol (4 August 1983 – 2 February 2023) was an Indian politician and a member of the 17th and 18th Legislative Assembly from Chhanbey, in the Indian state of Uttar Pradesh. He was a member of the Apna Dal (Sonelal) party. He died on 2 February 2023 due to cancer at a hospital in Mumbai, Maharashtra.

== Political career ==
Rahul Prakash became a member of the 17th and 18th Legislative Assembly of Uttar Pradesh in 2017 and 2022.

== Posts held ==
#	From	To	Position	Comments
01 02	2017 2022	2022 Incumbent	Member, 17th and 18th Legislative Assembly	

== See also ==
- Uttar Pradesh Legislative Assembly
