= Mucha Museum =

The Mucha Museum (Czech: Muchovo muzeum) may refer to:

- Mucha Museum (Savarin Palace), museum operated by the Mucha Foundation
- Mucha Museum (Kounice Palace), museum operated by Sebastian Pawlowski
