= 2016 Israeli Beach Soccer League =

Soccer League

Tournament details
- Host country: Israel
- Dates: 17 June – 29 July 2016
- Teams: 12 (from 1 confederation)
- Venue: 1 (in 1 host city)

Final positions
- Champions: (Israel) Bnei "Falfala" Kfar Qassem (4th title)
- Runners-up: (Israel) "Schwartz Home" Rosh HaAyin

Tournament statistics
- Matches played: 41
- Goals scored: 335 (8.17 per match)
- Top scorer(s): (Israel) Sharon Gormezano (Bnei Yehuda "Nitzan) (14 goals)
- Best player: (Brazil) Dino (Bnei "Falfala" Kfar Qassem)

The 2016 Israeli Beach Soccer League was a national beach soccer league that took place between 17 June and 29 July 2016, in Netanya, Israel.

== Group stage ==
All kickoff times are of local time in Netanya, Israel (UTC+02:00).

=== Group A ===
Pos	Team	Pld	W	W+	WP	L	GF	GA	GD	Pts	Qualification
1	Bnei "Falfala" Kfar Qassem	5	5	0	0	0	26	13	+13	15	Clinched quarterfinal berth
2	Bnei Yehuda "Nitzan"	5	3	0	0	2	25	17	+8	9	Clinched quarterfinal berth
3	Hapoel Ironi Petah Tikva	5	3	0	0	2	21	19	+2	9	Clinched quarterfinal berth
4	Hapoel "Energy Park" Hedera	5	2	0	0	3	15	13	+2	6	Clinched quarterfinal berth
5	Ilmazer "Yirmiyahu" Holon	5	2	0	0	3	17	21	−4	6	Clinched relegation playoffs
6	"COFFEE4U" Kfar Saba	5	0	0	0	5	9	30	−21	0	Clinched relegation playoffs

17 June 2016
13:00

Hapoel "Energy Park" Hedera	6 - 1	"COFFEE4U" Kfar Saba
H. Meri 7', A. Elimelech; G. Eini, 36'; M. Kirtava	Report	4' K. Malul

"Schwartz Home" Arena, Poleg Beach, Netanya
17 June 2016
13:50

Bnei Yehuda "Nitzan"	7 - 2	Ilmazer "Yirmiyahu" Holon
S. Gormezano,,, R. Peretz; Andrejinho; A. Halifa	Report	, A. Zvulun

"Schwartz Home" Arena, Poleg Beach, Netanya
17 June 2016
15:40

Bnei "Falfala" Kfar Qassem	5 - 3	Hapoel Ironi Petah Tikva
N. Sarsur, 22', A. Yatim; K. Frij	Report	1' O. Ilos; E. Elobra; 36' T. Ilos

"Schwartz Home" Arena, Poleg Beach, Netanya

24 June 2016
13:50

"COFFEE4U" Kfar Saba	1 - 6	Bnei "Falfala" Kfar Qassem
A. Maher 32'	Report	N. Sarsur, 18' A. Amer; 24' A. Yatim; 30' Dino; 33' R. Badir

"Schwartz Home" Arena, Poleg Beach, Netanya
24 June 2016
14:50

Ilmazer "Yirmiyahu" Holon	2 - 4	Hapoel "Energy Park" Hedera
S. Edri 8'; O. Halwani 28'	Report	2', 7' M. Kirtava; 12' A. Hakak; 15' H. Meri

"Schwartz Home" Arena, Poleg Beach, Netanya
24 June 2016
16:30

Hapoel Ironi Petah Tikva	4 - 2	Bnei Yehuda "Nitzan"
A. Ventura 10'; T. Shulkowsky 24'; E. Elobra 25'; E. Shmueli 34'	Report	6' A. Santos; 32' S. Gormezano

"Schwartz Home" Arena, Poleg Beach, Netanya

1 July 2016
13:00

Hapoel "Energy Park" Hedera	2 - 4	Hapoel Ironi Petah Tikva
B. Sitelkol; G. Eini 36'	Report	22', 29' T. Ilos; 29' O. Ilos; 34' O. Boaron

"Schwartz Home" Arena, Poleg Beach, Netanya
1 July 2016
14:50

Ilmazer "Yirmiyahu" Holon	4 - 1	"COFFEE4U" Kfar Saba
S. Kophman; Y. Sabag, 32'; S. Edri	Report	A. Maher

"Schwartz Home" Arena, Poleg Beach, Netanya
1 July 2016
16:30

Bnei "Falfala" Kfar Qassem	8 - 4	Bnei Yehuda "Nitzan
A. Yatim 18'; N. Sarsur 19'; Dino 20', 31'; D. da Silva 22'; A. Sarsur 24', 33'; K. Frij 30'	Report	S. Gormezano; 30' Anderzinho; 36' E. Magol; 36' A. Santos

"Schwartz Home" Arena, Poleg Beach, Netanya

8 July 2016
13:50

Hapoel Ironi Petah Tikva	5 - 4	"COFFEE4U" Kfar Saba
D. Maradona 1'; T. Ilos 5', 16'; T. Shulkowsky 11'; Heverton 29'	Report	26' A. Maher; 27' Y. Simhon; 31' K. Cohen; 34' N. Mehani

"Schwartz Home" Arena, Poleg Beach, Netanya
8 July 2016
14:50

Bnei Yehuda "Nitzan	3 - 1	Hapoel "Energy Park" Hedera
Anderzinho 7', 23'; S. Gormezano 30'	Report	8' H. Meri

"Schwartz Home" Arena, Poleg Beach, Netanya
8 July 2016
16:30

Bnei "Falfala" Kfar Qassem	4 - 3	Ilmazer "Yirmiyahu" Holon
N. Sarsur 10'; A. Yatim 16', 32'; Dino 18'	Report	5', 34' O. Halwani; 25' S. Edri

"Schwartz Home" Arena, Poleg Beach, Netanya

15 July 2016
13:50

Ilmazer "Yirmiyahu" Holon	6 - 5	Hapoel Ironi Petah Tikva
S. Hayat 3', 13'; Y. Sabag 13'; S. Kophman 17', 18'; M. Amar 29'	Report	3' Heverton; 14', 16' T. Ilos; 29' A. Ventura; 31' O. Boaron

"Schwartz Home" Arena, Poleg Beach, Netanya
15 July 2016
14:50

"COFFEE4U" Kfar Saba	2 - 9	Bnei Yehuda "Nitzan
A. Maher 1', 25'	Report	6', 12', 36' S. Gormezano; 9', 21', 28' A. Halifa; 11' O. Davidi; 17' E. Magol; 22' A. Santos

"Schwartz Home" Arena, Poleg Beach, Netanya
15 July 2016
16:30

Hapoel "Energy Park" Hedera	2 - 3	Bnei "Falfala" Kfar Qassem
H. Meri 5'; G. Eini 21'	Report	17' A. Yatim; 22' D. da Silva; 34' Dino

"Schwartz Home" Arena, Poleg Beach, Netanya

=== Group B ===
Pos	Team	Pld	W	W+	WP	L	GF	GA	GD	Pts	Qualification
1	"Schwartz Home" Rosh HaAyin	5	3	1	0	1	26	16	+10	12	Clinched quarterfinal berth
2	Maccabi "RE/MAX" Netanya	5	4	0	0	1	26	17	+9	12	Clinched quarterfinal berth
3	Hapoel Karmiel	5	2	0	0	3	20	23	−3	6	Clinched quarterfinal berth
4	Hani "Nicoletti" Tel Aviv	5	2	0	0	3	15	20	−5	6	Clinched quarterfinal berth
5	Maccabi "Ido Keren" Haifa	5	1	0	1	3	21	22	−1	5	Clinched relegation playoffs
6	Beitar "iTrader" Jerusalem	5	0	0	1	4	13	23	−10	2	Clinched relegation playoffs

17 June 2016
14:50

"Schwartz Home" Rosh HaAyin	5 - 2	Beitar "iTrader" Jerusalem
I. Bar David,, O. Pahima; A. Shemesh	Report	O. Giro; E. Salami

"Schwartz Home" Arena, Poleg Beach, Netanya
17 June 2016
16:30

Maccabi "Ido Keren" Haifa	3 - 3 (a.e.t.)	Hani "Nicoletti" Tel Aviv
D. Reyder, A. Malca	Report	, G. Itzhak; M. Ben Lulu
Penalties
D. Reyder (penalty scored)	3 - 2

"Schwartz Home" Arena, Poleg Beach, Netanya
17 June 2016
17:20

Maccabi "RE/MAX" Netanya	5 - 2	Hapoel Karmiel
A. Levi, 23'; E. Tzabari 15', 19'; R. Amran	Report	K. Badash; R. Shmul

"Schwartz Home" Arena, Poleg Beach, Netanya

24 June 2016
13:00

Hapoel Karmiel	3 - 4 (a.e.t.)	"Schwartz Home" Rosh HaAyin
Y. Benisho; Y. Shina 18'; N. Sapir 22'	Report	10' V. Ganon; 22' A. Ben-Muha; W. Agbaria; S. Chiky

"Schwartz Home" Arena, Poleg Beach, Netanya
Referee: Eli Hacmon & Tzvika Levy
24 June 2016
15:40

Beitar "iTrader" Jerusalem	2 - 2 (a.e.t.)	Maccabi "Ido Keren" Haifa
S. Ifrah 14'; A. Gaitan 34'	Report	21' I. Swisa; 29' B. Siman Tov
Penalties
E. Salami (penalty scored)	1 - 0	(penalty missed) A. Malca

"Schwartz Home" Arena, Poleg Beach, Netanya
24 June 2016
17:20

Hani "Nicoletti" Tel Aviv	2 - 5	Maccabi "RE/MAX" Netanya
O. Halevi 17'; G. Itzhak 36'	Report	6' A. Levi; 10' B. Briga; 12' M. Garrido; 26' A. Danin; 33' E. Tzabari

"Schwartz Home" Arena, Poleg Beach, Netanya

1 July 2016
13:50

Beitar "iTrader" Jerusalem	3 - 6	Hapoel Karmiel
S. Katzar; E. Salami; Y. Abutbul	Report	(o.g.) O. Nave, K. Badash; Y. Shina, Y. Benisho

"Schwartz Home" Arena, Poleg Beach, Netanya
1 July 2016
15:40

"Schwartz Home" Rosh HaAyin	5 - 6	Hani "Nicoletti" Tel Aviv
W. Agbaria 7', 18'; S. Chiky 20', 26'; O. Pahima 36'	Report	6', 34' B. Uzan; 8' D. Halevi; 16', 27' O. Halevi; 28' M. Ben Lulu

"Schwartz Home" Arena, Poleg Beach, Netanya
1 July 2016
17:20

Maccabi "RE/MAX" Netanya	6 - 3	Maccabi "Ido Keren" Haifa
M. Garrido 3', 14'; E. Tzabari 12'; A. Danin 20'; A. Levi 27', 36'	Report	6' E. Shick; 17' N. Revivo; 19' A. Malca

"Schwartz Home" Arena, Poleg Beach, Netanya

8 July 2016
13:00

Hani "Nicoletti" Tel Aviv	1 - 4	Hapoel Karmiel
M. Ben Lulu 8'	Report	2' A. Marciano; 12', 25' K. Badash; 35' Y. Shina

"Schwartz Home" Arena, Poleg Beach, Netanya
8 July 2016
15:40

Maccabi "Ido Keren" Haifa	2 - 6	"Schwartz Home" Rosh HaAyin
A. Malca 8'; N. Revivo 13'	Report	3', 23' Dieginio; 6', 14' V. Ganon; 29', 34' S. Chiky

"Schwartz Home" Arena, Poleg Beach, Netanya
8 July 2016
17:20

Beitar "iTrader" Jerusalem	4 - 7	Maccabi "RE/MAX" Netanya
D. Alberman 32'; S. Katzar 33'; A. Danin 34' (o.g.); Y. Hatuka 35'	Report	4' A. Levi; (red card) 16' A. Levi; 6' R. Amran; 13' E. Tzabari; 14', 28' A. Danin; 22' B. Briga; 25' M. Garrido

"Schwartz Home" Arena, Poleg Beach, Netanya

15 July 2016
13:00

Beitar "iTrader" Jerusalem	2 - 3	Hani "Nicoletti" Tel Aviv
E. Salami 6'; O. Giro 18'	Report	16' O. Halevi; 23', 31' D. Halevi

"Schwartz Home" Arena, Poleg Beach, Netanya
Referee: Eli Hacmon & Alon Yefet
15 July 2016
15:40

Hapoel Karmiel	5 - 10	Maccabi "Ido Keren" Haifa
K. Badash 14'; N. Sapir 15', 26', 35'; Y. Benisho 24'	Report	2', 6', 17', 29', 36'; 12', 23', 34' I. Tal; 18', 33' E. Cohen

"Schwartz Home" Arena, Poleg Beach, Netanya
15 July 2016
17:20

Maccabi "RE/MAX" Netanya	3 - 6	"Schwartz Home" Rosh HaAyin
A. Danin 2'; Fran 28'; M. Garrido 31'	Report	10', 16' O. Pahima; 15', 35' V. Ganon; 26' I. Bar David; 27' W. Agbaria; 33' E. Sasportas

"Schwartz Home" Arena, Poleg Beach, Netanya

== Relegation playoffs (Loser on Final is relegated) ==
Semi-finals
22 July 2016
Maccabi "Ido Keren" Haifa	7
"COFFEE4U" Kfar Saba	3
22 July 2016
Ilmazer "Yirmiyahu" Holon	2
Beitar "iTrader" Jerusalem	4

Final
29 July 2016
"COFFEE4U" Kfar Saba	5
Ilmazer "Yirmiyahu" Holon	8

=== Relegation playoffs ===
22 July 2016
13:00

Maccabi "Ido Keren" Haifa	7 - 3	"COFFEE4U" Kfar Saba
A. Malca 7', 13', 33', 35'; N. Revivo 15'; E. Cohen 27'; I. Tal 31'	Report	25' O. Yacov; 29' N. Mehani; 34' Y. Ofri

"Schwartz Home" Arena, Poleg Beach, Netanya
22 July 2016
13:50

Ilmazer "Yirmiyahu" Holon	2 - 4	Beitar "iTrader" Jerusalem
O. Halwani 6'; S. Edri 27'	Report	3', 28' E. Salami; 13', 30' S. Ifrah

"Schwartz Home" Arena, Poleg Beach, Netanya

== Knockout stage ==
Quarter-finals
22 July 2016
Bnei Yehuda "Nitzan"	10
Hapoel Karmiel	2
22 July 2016
Bnei "Falfala" Kfar Qassem	9
Hani "Nicoletti" Tel Aviv	4
22 July 2016
"Schwartz Home" Rosh HaAyin	4
Hapoel "Energy Park" Hedera	3
22 July 2016
Maccabi "RE/MAX" Netanya (p)	4 (2)
Hapoel Ironi Petah Tikva	4 (1)

Semi-finals
29 July 2016
Bnei Yehuda "Nitzan"	2
"Schwartz Home" Rosh HaAyin	4
29 July 2016
Bnei "Falfala" Kfar Qassem	5
Maccabi "RE/MAX" Netanya	3

Final
29 July 2016
"Schwartz Home" Rosh HaAyin	3
Bnei "Falfala" Kfar Qassem (a.e.t.)	4

=== Quarter-finals ===
22 July 2016
14:40

Bnei Yehuda "Nitzan"	10 - 2	Hapoel Karmiel
Anderzinho 12', 14', 25'; S. Gormezano 13', 16'; E. Magol 18', 32'; A. Santos 23'; R. Peretz 27'; A. Halifa 28'	Report	19', 24' Y. Benisho

"Schwartz Home" Arena, Poleg Beach, Netanya

22 July 2016
15:40

Bnei "Falfala" Kfar Qassem	9 - 4	Hani "Nicoletti" Tel Aviv
Dino 1', 7', 12', 27'; A. da Silva 8', 32'; A. Sarsur 18'; N. Sarsur 28'; D. da Silva 30'	Report	2', 16', 26' M. Ben Lulu; 24' D. Halevi

"Schwartz Home" Arena, Poleg Beach, Netanya
Referee: Liran Wachsberger

22 July 2016
16:30

"Schwartz Home" Rosh HaAyin	4 - 3	Hapoel "Energy Park" Hedera
Dieginho 1', 20', 33'; S. Chiky 12'	Report	1', 4' M. Kirtava; (red card) 34' M. Kirtava; 34'

"Schwartz Home" Arena, Poleg Beach, Netanya

22 July 2016
17:30

Maccabi "RE/MAX" Netanya	4 - 4 (a.e.t.)	Hapoel Ironi Petah Tikva
C. Torres 3', 21'; B. Briga 10'; Azberga 28' (o.g.)	Report	14' D. Maradona; 17', 22' T. Ilos; 24' E. Elobra
Penalties
Fran (penalty scored); M. Garrido (penalty scored)	2 - 1	(penalty scored) O. Boaron; (penalty missed) T. Ilos

"Schwartz Home" Arena, Poleg Beach, Netanya

=== Semi-finals ===
29 July 2016
13:00

Bnei Yehuda "Nitzan"	2 - 4	"Schwartz Home" Rosh HaAyin
S. Gormezano 5', 31'	Report	7' Dieginio; 20' S. Chiky; 25' V. Ganon; 30' E. Sasportas

"Schwartz Home" Arena, Poleg Beach, Netanya

29 July 2016
14:00

Bnei "Falfala" Kfar Qassem	5 - 3	Maccabi "RE/MAX" Netanya
Dino 4', 36'; A. Yatim 18'; A. Sarsur 24'; A. da Silva 35'	Report	4' Fran; 21' E. Tzabari; 27' R. Amran

"Schwartz Home" Arena, Poleg Beach, Netanya

=== Youth Final ===
29 July 2016
15:00

Arayot Hayam Dora Netanya	5 - 2	Yahalomey Mizrah Netanya
	Report

"Schwartz Home" Arena, Poleg Beach, Netanya

=== Survival match ===
29 July 2016
15:50

"COFFEE4U" Kfar Saba	5 - 8	Ilmazer "Yirmiyahu" Holon
N. Mehani 4', 29'; A. Maher 8', 9', 30'	Report	3', 6', 16' S. Edri; 9' Y. Sabag; 22', 32' S. Hayat; 28' S. Kophman; 35' M. Amar

"Schwartz Home" Arena, Poleg Beach, Netanya

=== Final ===
29 July 2016
17:10

"Schwartz Home" Rosh HaAyin	3 - 4 (a.e.t.)	Bnei "Falfala" Kfar Qassem
S. Chiky 3'; V. Ganon 9'; W. Agbaria 33'	Report	6', 26' D. da Silva; 18', 37' Dino

"Schwartz Home" Arena, Poleg Beach, Netanya

== Goalscorers ==
14 goals

- S. Gormezano (Bnei Yehuda "Nitzan")

13 goals

- Dino (Bnei "Falfala" Kfar Qassem)

12 goals

- A. Malca (Maccabi "Ido Keren" Haifa)

9 goals

- T. Ilos (Hapoel Ironi Petah Tikva)

8 goals

- S. Chiky ("Schwartz Home" Rosh HaAyin)

7 goals

- A. Yatim (Bnei "Falfala" Kfar Qassem)
- N. Sarsur (Bnei "Falfala" Kfar Qassem)
- V. Ganon ("Schwartz Home" Rosh HaAyin)
- S. Edri (Ilmazer "Yirmiyahu" Holon)
- A. Maher ("COFFEE4U" Kfar Saba)

6 goals

- Dieginio ("Schwartz Home" Rosh HaAyin)
- A. Levi (Maccabi "RE/MAX" Netanya)
- M. Garrido (Maccabi "RE/MAX" Netanya)
- E. Tzabari (Maccabi "RE/MAX" Netanya)
- Anderzinho (Bnei Yehuda "Nitzan")
- M. Ben Lulu (Hani "Nicoletti" Tel Aviv)
- K. Badash (Hapoel Karmiel)
- Y. Benisho (Hapoel Karmiel)

5 goals

- D. da Silva (Bnei "Falfala" Kfar Qassem)
- W. Agbaria ("Schwartz Home" Rosh HaAyin)
- A. Danin (Maccabi "RE/MAX" Netanya)
- A. Halifa (Bnei Yehuda "Nitzan")
- M. Kirtava (Hapoel "Energy Park" Hedera)
- H. Meri (Hapoel "Energy Park" Hedera)
- E. Salami (Beitar "iTrader" Jerusalem)

4 goals

- A. Sarsur (Bnei "Falfala" Kfar Qassem)
- O. Pahima ("Schwartz Home" Rosh HaAyin)
- I. Bar David ("Schwartz Home" Rosh HaAyin)
- E. Magol (Bnei Yehuda "Nitzan")
- A. Santos (Bnei Yehuda "Nitzan")
- G. Eini (Hapoel "Energy Park" Hedera)
- D. Halevi (Hani "Nicoletti" Tel Aviv)
- O. Halevi (Hani "Nicoletti" Tel Aviv)
- N. Sapir (Hapoel Karmiel)
- I. Tal (Maccabi "Ido Keren" Haifa)
- O. Halwani (Ilmazer "Yirmiyahu" Holon)
- S. Hayat (Ilmazer "Yirmiyahu" Holon)
- S. Kophman (Ilmazer "Yirmiyahu" Holon)
- Y. Sabag (Ilmazer "Yirmiyahu" Holon)
- N. Mehani ("COFFEE4U" Kfar Saba)

3 goals

- A. da Silva (Bnei "Falfala" Kfar Qassem)
- B. Briga (Maccabi "RE/MAX" Netanya)
- R. Amran (Maccabi "RE/MAX" Netanya)
- E. Elobra (Hapoel Ironi Petah Tikva)
- G. Itzhak (Hani "Nicoletti" Tel Aviv)
- Y. Shina (Hapoel Karmiel)
- E. Cohen (Maccabi "Ido Keren" Haifa)
- N. Revivo (Maccabi "Ido Keren" Haifa)

2 goals

- A. Amer (Bnei "Falfala" Kfar Qassem)
- K. Frij (Bnei "Falfala" Kfar Qassem)
- E. Sasportas ("Schwartz Home" Rosh HaAyin)
- C. Torres (Maccabi "RE/MAX" Netanya)
- Fran (Maccabi "RE/MAX" Netanya)
- R. Peretz (Bnei Yehuda "Nitzan")
- D. Maradona (Hapoel Ironi Petah Tikva)
- Heverton (Hapoel Ironi Petah Tikva)
- T. Shulkowsky (Hapoel Ironi Petah Tikva)
- O. Ilos (Hapoel Ironi Petah Tikva)
- A. Ventura (Hapoel Ironi Petah Tikva)
- O. Boaron (Hapoel Ironi Petah Tikva)
- B. Uzan (Hani "Nicoletti" Tel Aviv)
- D. Reyder (Maccabi "Ido Keren" Haifa)
- S. Ifrah (Beitar "iTrader" Jerusalem)
- S. Katzar (Beitar "iTrader" Jerusalem)
- A. Zvulun (Ilmazer "Yirmiyahu" Holon)
- M. Amar (Ilmazer "Yirmiyahu" Holon)

== Winners ==
2016 Israeli Beach Soccer League
Winners:

Kfar Qassem BS Club (beach soccer)
Fourth title

== Awards ==
Best Player (MVP)
(Brazil) Dino (Bnei "Falfala" Kfar Qassem)
Top Scorer
(Israel) Sharon Gormezano (Bnei Yehuda "Nitzan")
14 goals
Best Goalkeeper
(Israel) Odi Rani (Bnei "Falfala" Kfar Qassem)

== See also ==
- Israeli Beach Soccer League
