= 2015 Israeli Beach Soccer League =

Tournament details
- Host country: Israel
- Dates: 12 June – 31 July 2015
- Teams: 12 (from 1 confederation)
- Venue(s): 1 (in 1 host city)

Final positions
- Champions: Bnei "Falfala" Kfar Qassem (3rd title)
- Runners-up: Maccabi "Doron Motors" Netanya

Tournament statistics
- Matches played: 41
- Goals scored: 298 (7.27 per match)
- Attendance: 17,000 (415 per match)
- Top scorer(s): Amer Yatim (Bnei "Falfala" Kfar Qassem) (13 goals)
- Best player(s): Amer Yatim (Bnei "Falfala" Kfar Qassem)

The 2015 Israeli Beach Soccer League was a national beach soccer league that took place between 12 June and 31 July 2015, in Netanya, Israel.

== Group stage ==
All kickoff times are of local time in Netanya, Israel (UTC+02:00).

=== Group A ===
Pos	Team	Pld	W	W+	WP	L	GF	GA	GD	Pts	Qualification
1	Maccabi "Doron Motors" Netanya	5	4	0	0	1	22	13	+9	12	Clinched quarterfinal berth
2	Hapoel Ironi "Deal Tov" Petah Tikva	5	4	0	0	1	22	14	+8	12	Clinched quarterfinal berth
3	Hapoel "Energy Park" Hedera	5	3	0	0	2	15	15	0	9	Clinched quarterfinal berth
4	Maccabi "Ido Keren" Haifa	5	2	0	0	3	21	19	+2	6	Clinched quarterfinal berth
5	"A.M.I. Yakutiel" Kfar Saba	5	1	1	0	3	16	15	+1	6	Clinched relegation playoffs
6	"Connect Logistics" Tel Aviv	5	0	0	0	5	13	33	−20	0	Clinched relegation playoffs

12 June 2015
13:00

Hapoel "Energy Park" Hedera	2 - 1	"A.M.I. Yakutiel" Kfar Saba
Y. Abutbul 29'; M. Asulin 36'	Report	37' Y. Simhon

"Super Stock" Arena, Poleg Beach, Netanya
12 June 2015
13:50

Hapoel Ironi "Deal Tov" Petah Tikva	5 - 3	"Connect Logistics" Tel Aviv
Y. Ababa 1'; O. Ilos 9'; Heverton 25'; A. Elimelech 33'; T. Ilos 36'	Report	18', 31' O. Yehezkel; 27' T. For

"Super Stock" Arena, Poleg Beach, Netanya
12 June 2015
17:10

Maccabi "Ido Keren" Haifa	3 - 5	Maccabi "Doron Motors" Netanya
W. Agbaria 5', 13', 31'	Report	12' E. Levy; 14' (o.g.) O. Kuprayev; 19' B. Briga; 26' A. Levi; 30' K. Badash

"Super Stock" Arena, Poleg Beach, Netanya

19 June 2015
14:40

"A.M.I. Yakutiel" Kfar Saba	1 - 4	Hapoel Ironi "Deal Tov" Petah Tikva
O. Yakov 26'	Report	2' (o.g.) K. Cohen; 10' T. Ilos; 18' O. Ilos; 28' B. Siman Tov

"Super Stock" Arena, Poleg Beach, Netanya
19 June 2015
16:20

"Connect Logistics" Tel Aviv	3 - 8	Maccabi "Ido Keren" Haifa
T. For 7', 25'; O. Yehezkel 34'	Report	7' W. Agbaria; 12', 36' N. Revivo; 19' P. Perez; 23', 29' A. Malca; 25', 26' I. Bar David

"Super Stock" Arena, Poleg Beach, Netanya
19 June 2015
17:10

Maccabi "Doron Motors" Netanya	4 - 2	Hapoel "Energy Park" Hedera
K. Badash 10'; B. Briga 20'; E. Levy 26', 34'	Report	21', 28' M. Ben Lulu

"Super Stock" Arena, Poleg Beach, Netanya

26 June 2015
14:40

Hapoel "Energy Park" Hedera	4 - 2	"Connect Logistics" Tel Aviv
M. Ben Lulu 18'; O. Buzaglo 22'; M. Kirtava 23'; G. Eini 28'	Report	15' T. For; 19' E. Shick

"Super Stock" Arena, Poleg Beach, Netanya
Referee: Guy Berger & David Mor Haim
26 June 2015
15:30

Maccabi "Ido Keren" Haifa	2 - 5	Hapoel Ironi "Deal Tov" Petah Tikva
A. Malca 18'; W. Agbaria 30'	Report	13', 21', 33' T. Ilos; 28' B. Siman Tov; 30' A. Elimelech

"Super Stock" Arena, Poleg Beach, Netanya
Referee: Liran Wachsberger & Eli Hachmon
26 June 2015
17:10

Maccabi "Doron Motors" Netanya	3 - 1	"A.M.I. Yakutiel" Kfar Saba
E. Levy 6'; A. Danin 28', 30'	Report	14' A. Mayer

"Super Stock" Arena, Poleg Beach, Netanya
Referee: Liran Wachsberger & Eli Hachmon

3 July 2015
13:00

Hapoel Ironi "Deal Tov" Petah Tikva	3 - 5	Hapoel "Energy Park" Hedera
Heverton 8'; A. Elimelech 20'; T. Ilos 24'	Report	6', 13' O. Buzaglo; 15' Nivaldo; 16' M. Kirtava; 17' E. Tzabari

"Super Stock" Arena, Poleg Beach, Netanya
3 July 2015
14:40

"A.M.I. Yakutiel" Kfar Saba	4 - 3 (a.e.t.)	Maccabi "Ido Keren" Haifa
A. Mayer 10', 33'; K. Malul 21', 38'	Report	1' W. Agabaria; 6' A. Malca; 32' I. Zarfati

"Super Stock" Arena, Poleg Beach, Netanya
3 July 2015
17:10

"Connect Logistics" Tel Aviv	2 - 7	Maccabi "Doron Motors" Netanya
	Report	6', 23' A. Danin; 8' A. Nakash; 10', 20' K. Badash; 15' R. Amran; 18' S. Edri

"Super Stock" Arena, Poleg Beach, Netanya

10 July 2015
13:50

"Connect Logistics" Tel Aviv	3 - 9	"A.M.I. Yakutiel" Kfar Saba
E. Shick 7'; Meir 18'; O. Yehezkel 31'	Report	8', 29' A. Mayer; 13', 22', 30', 34' N. Mechani; 20', 27', 34' K. Malul

"Super Stock" Arena, Poleg Beach, Netanya
10 July 2015
14:40

Maccabi "Ido Keren" Haifa	5 - 2	Hapoel "Energy Park" Hedera
A. Malca 3', 14', 24'; P. Perez 8'; O. Moshe 30'	Report	4' M. Kirtava; 34' Nivaldo

"Super Stock" Arena, Poleg Beach, Netanya
Referee: Alon Yefet & Guy Berger
10 July 2015
17:10

Maccabi "Doron Motors" Netanya	3 - 5	Hapoel Ironi "Deal Tov" Petah Tikva
K. Badash 14', 23'; Dieginio 28'	Report	3' A. Elimelech; 5', 13', 36' T. Ilos; 35' Heverton

"Super Stock" Arena, Poleg Beach, Netanya
Referee: David Mor Haim & Eli Hacmon

=== Group B ===
Pos	Team	Pld	W	W+	WP	L	GF	GA	GD	Pts	Qualification
1	Bnei "Falfala" Kfar Qassem	5	5	0	0	0	30	14	+16	15	Clinched quarterfinal berth
2	"Landora" Bnei Yehuda "Nitzan"	5	4	0	0	1	22	12	+10	12	Clinched quarterfinal berth
3	Beitar "Itrader" Jerusalem	5	2	0	1	2	17	16	+1	8	Clinched quarterfinal berth
4	"Eli Cohen Hadbarot" Rosh HaAyin	5	3	0	0	2	21	19	+2	9	Clinched quarterfinal berth
5	"Yaniv Ilmazer" Holon	5	1	0	0	4	11	21	−10	3	Clinched relegation playoffs
6	"Klil" Karmiel	5	0	0	0	5	10	32	−22	0	Clinched relegation playoffs

12 June 2015
14:40

Beitar "Itrader" Jerusalem	4 - 0	"Klil" Karmiel
Y. Shina 10', 17', 19', 21'	Report

"Super Stock" Arena, Poleg Beach, Netanya
12 June 2015
15:30

"Eli Cohen Hadbarot" Rosh HaAyin	4 - 2	"Yaniv Ilmazer" Holon
L. Berkovich 6', 16'; E. Sasportas 10'; V. Ganon 36'	Report	4' A. Ben-Muha; 23' O. Halwani

"Super Stock" Arena, Poleg Beach, Netanya
12 June 2015
16:20

Bnei "Falfala" Kfar Qassem	5 - 4	"Landora" Bnei Yehuda "Nitzan"
A. Yatim 5', 23'; D. da Silva 7'; S. Moreb 28', 30'	Report	3', 6' S. Gormezano; 21' F. da Silva; 31' (o.g.) D. da Silva

"Super Stock" Arena, Poleg Beach, Netanya

19 June 2015
13:00

"Landora" Bnei Yehuda "Nitzan"	4 - 1	"Klil" Karmiel
E. Magol 10'; S. Gormezano 18'; F. da Silva 29', 35'	Report	7' T. Atrash

"Super Stock" Arena, Poleg Beach, Netanya
19 June 2015
13:50

"Eli Cohen Hadbarot" Rosh HaAyin	3 - 3 (a.e.t.)	Beitar "Itrader" Jerusalem
V. Ganon 3', 16'; E. Sasportas 10'	Report	23' Z. Zaken; 27' O. Molay; 29' G. Cohen
Penalties
	3 - 4

"Super Stock" Arena, Poleg Beach, Netanya
19 June 2015
15:30

"Yaniv Ilmazer" Holon	1 - 5	Bnei "Falfala" Kfar Qassem
A. Ben-Muha 29'	Report	5' Dino; 18', 20', 27' A. Yatim; 32' Juninho

"Super Stock" Arena, Poleg Beach, Netanya

26 June 2015
13:00

Bnei "Falfala" Kfar Qassem	4 - 2	Beitar "Itrader" Jerusalem
Dino 3', 10'; M. Amer 15'; Adam Sarsur 29'	Report	8', 28' Y. Shina

"Super Stock" Arena, Poleg Beach, Netanya
Referee: Guy Berger & David Mor Haim
26 June 2015
13:50

"Landora" Bnei Yehuda "Nitzan"	3 - 2	"Yaniv Ilmazer" Holon
O. Atia 5', 18'; E. Magol 21'	Report	20' A. Zvulun; 32' A. Ben-Muha

"Super Stock" Arena, Poleg Beach, Netanya
Referee: Guy Berger & Lilach Asulin
26 June 2015
16:20

"Klil" Karmiel	2 - 9	"Eli Cohen Hadbarot" Rosh HaAyin
M. Balbilia 9'; T. Sanalla 29'	Report	10' Y. Mahluf; 18', 20', 31' E. Cohen; 24', 36' H. Atias; 21' , 23' V. Ganon; 30' E. Sasportas

"Super Stock" Arena, Poleg Beach, Netanya
Referee: Liran Wachsberger & Idan Bernstein

3 July 2015
13:50

Beitar "Itrader" Jerusalem	5 - 4	"Yaniv Ilmazer" Holon
Y. Hatuka 3'; G. Cohen 7'; A. Mauda 19', 29'; A. Gabay 24' (o.g.)	Report	12' A. Ben-Muha; 17' O. Halwani; 19' Y. Benisho; 24' M. Amar

"Super Stock" Arena, Poleg Beach, Netanya
3 July 2015
15:30

"Klil" Karmiel	3 - 10	Bnei "Falfala" Kfar Qassem
T. Atrash 26', 32'; A. Yatim 30' (.o.g.)	Report	3' Adam Sarsur; 5', 23', 34' A. Yatim; 7' S. Moreb; 11' Juninho; 13', 17', 25' Dino

"Super Stock" Arena, Poleg Beach, Netanya
3 July 2015
16:20

"Eli Cohen Hadbarot" Rosh HaAyin	1 - 6	"Landora" Bnei Yehuda "Nitzan"
E. Cohen 32'	Report	9', 17' A. Halifa; 15' R. Peretz; 20' S. Gormezano; 26', 31' F. da Silva

"Super Stock" Arena, Poleg Beach, Netanya

10 July 2015
13:00

"Yaniv Ilmazer" Holon	5 - 4	"Klil" Karmiel
O. Halwani 7', 27', 31'; S. Hayat 21'; A. Ben-Muha 35'	Report	9', 25' R. Shmul; 16', 22' M. Balbilia

"Super Stock" Arena, Poleg Beach, Netanya
Referee: Liran Wachsberger & Guy Berger
10 July 2015
15:30

"Landora" Bnei Yehuda "Nitzan"	5 - 3	Beitar "Itrader" Jerusalem
O. Atia 4'; F. da Silva 4', 27'; S. Gormezano 14', 28'	Report	11', 33' Y. Shina; 29' S. Katzar

"Super Stock" Arena, Poleg Beach, Netanya
10 July 2015
16:20

Bnei "Falfala" Kfar Qassem	6 - 4	"Eli Cohen Hadbarot" Rosh HaAyin
A. Yatim 3', 15'; N. Sarsur 9'; Ahmed Sarsur 26'; Dino 20'; S. Moreb 24'	Report	9' E. Salami; 13', 36' V. Ganon; 22' I. Matzri

"Super Stock" Arena, Poleg Beach, Netanya
Referee: David Mor Haim & Eli Hacmon

== Relegation playoffs (Loser on Final is relegated) ==
Semi-finals
31 July 2015
"A.M.I. Yakutiel" Kfar Saba	7
"Klil" Karmiel	2
31 July 2015
"Yaniv Ilmazer" Holon (p)	4 (2)
"Connect Logistics" Tel Aviv	4 (1)

Final
31 July 2015
"Klil" Karmiel	6
"Connect Logistics" Tel Aviv	8

=== Relegation playoffs ===
17 July 2015
13:00

"A.M.I. Yakutiel" Kfar Saba	7 - 2	"Klil" Karmiel
A. Mayer 1'; K. Cohen 11', 18'; Y. Ofri 25'; N. Mechani 27'; G. Klamente 29', 35'	Report	21' R. Shmul; 33' L. Tal

"Super Stock" Arena, Poleg Beach, Netanya
17 July 2015
13:50

"Yaniv Ilmazer" Holon	4 - 4 (a.e.t.)	"Connect Logistics" Tel Aviv
Y. Benisho 9', 22'; Y. Sabag 15'; A. Zvulun 24'	Report	4' O. Nave; 20' A. Crispis; 21' M. Marzayev; 34' O. Halevi
Penalties
O. Halwani (penalty scored); A. Ben-Muha (penalty scored)	2 - 1	(penalty scored) O. Halevi; (penalty missed) O. Nave

"Super Stock" Arena, Poleg Beach, Netanya

== Knockout stage ==
Quarter-finals
17 July 2015
"Landora" Bnei Yehuda "Nitzan"	1
Hapoel "Energy Park" Hedera	2
17 July 2015
Hapoel Ironi "Deal Tov" Petah Tikva	1
Beitar "Itrader" Jerusalem	3
17 July 2015
Bnei "Falfala" Kfar Qassem	6
Maccabi "Ido Keren" Haifa	2
17 July 2015
Maccabi "Doron Motors" Netanya	7
"Eli Cohen Hadbarot" Rosh HaAyin	2

Semi-finals
31 July 2015
Bnei "Falfala" Kfar Qassem	5
Beitar "Itrader" Jerusalem	3
31 July 2015
Maccabi "Doron Motors" Netanya (p)	2 (4)
Hapoel "Energy Park" Hedera	2 (3)

Final
31 July 2015
Bnei "Falfala" Kfar Qassem	3
Maccabi "Doron Motors" Netanya	1

=== Quarter-finals ===
17 July 2015
14:40

"Landora" Bnei Yehuda "Nitzan"	1 - 2	Hapoel "Energy Park" Hedera
A. Hakak 1' (o.g.)	Report	6' E. Tzabari; 10' H. Meri

"Super Stock" Arena, Poleg Beach, Netanya

17 July 2015
15:40

Hapoel Ironi "Deal Tov" Petah Tikva	1 - 3	Beitar "Itrader" Jerusalem
D. Gomez 17'	Report	22' A. Mauda; 26' Y. Shina; 33' D. Alberman

"Super Stock" Arena, Poleg Beach, Netanya

17 July 2015
16:30

Bnei "Falfala" Kfar Qassem	6 - 2	Maccabi "Ido Keren" Haifa
Dino 3', 18'; N. Sarsur 18'; A. Yatim 28'; D. da Silva 34'; S. Moreb 36'	Report	1', 30' A. Malca

"Super Stock" Arena, Poleg Beach, Netanya

17 July 2015
17:30

Maccabi "Doron Motors" Netanya	7 - 2	"Eli Cohen Hadbarot" Rosh HaAyin
K. Badash 3', 30'; R. Amran 9'; B. Briga 17'; Dieginho 22', 33'; A. Danin 29'	Report	13' E. Sasportas; 36' D. Maradona

"Super Stock" Arena, Poleg Beach, Netanya

=== Semi-finals ===
31 July 2015
12:40

Bnei "Falfala" Kfar Qassem	5 - 3	Beitar "Itrader" Jerusalem
S. Moreb 12', 31'; Dino 16'; A. Yatim 25'; D. da Silva 30'	Report	14', 34' A. Mauda; 22' Y. Shina

"Super Stock" Arena, Poleg Beach, Netanya

31 July 2015
13:30

Maccabi "Doron Motors" Netanya	2 - 2 (a.e.t.)	Hapoel "Energy Park" Hedera
Dieginho 3'; A. Levi 21'	Report	21' M. Kirtava; 22' E. Tzabari
Penalties
K. Badash (penalty scored); Fran (penalty scored); A. Danin (penalty scored); Dieginho (penalty scored)	4 - 3	(penalty scored) M. Kirtava; (penalty scored) Y. Abutbul; (penalty scored) G. Eini (penalty missed)

"Super Stock" Arena, Poleg Beach, Netanya

=== Survival match ===
31 July 2015
15:10

"Connect Logistics" Tel Aviv	8 - 6	"Klil" Karmiel
O. Yehezkel 6'; M. Marzayev 13'; O. Halevi 14'; O. Nave 23', 32', 36'	Report	15' A. Zahan; 17' L. Gal; 17' I. Berkovich; 25', 31' A. Cohen; 36' B. Meir

"Super Stock" Arena, Poleg Beach, Netanya

=== Exhibition match ===
31 July 2015
16:10

"A.M.I. Yakutiel" Stars	2 - 2	Sport Channel
	Report

"Super Stock" Arena, Poleg Beach, Netanya

=== Final ===
31 July 2015
17:10

Bnei "Falfala" Kfar Qassem	3 - 1	Maccabi "Doron Motors" Netanya
A. Yatim 2', 35'; Dino 12'	Report	25' Fran

"Super Stock" Arena, Poleg Beach, Netanya

== Goalscorers ==
13 goals

- Amer Yatim (Bnei "Falfala" Kfar Qassem)

11 goals

- Dino (Bnei "Falfala" Kfar Qassem)

10 goals

- Y. Shina (Beitar "Itrader" Jerusalem)

9 goals

- Tzahi Ilos (Hapoel Ironi "Deal Tov" Petah Tikva)
- Avi Malca (Maccabi "Ido Keren" Haifa)

8 goals

- Kobi Badash (Maccabi "Doron Motors" Netanya)

7 goals

- Sameh Moreb (Bnei "Falfala" Kfar Qassem)
- Vitali Ganon ("Eli Cohen Hadbarot" Rosh HaAyin)
- Ferreira da Silva ("Landora" Bnei Yehuda "Nitzan")

6 goal

- Adam Mayer ("A.M.I. Yakutiel" Kfar Saba)
- Sharon Gormezano ("Eli Cohen Hadbarot" Rosh HaAyin)
- Wasim Agbaria (Maccabi "Ido Keren" Haifa)

5 goal

- Adir Danin (Maccabi "Doron Motors" Netanya)
- Kfir Malul ("A.M.I. Yakutiel" Kfar Saba)
- Ofir Halwani ("Yaniv Ilmazer" Holon)

== Winners ==
2015 Israeli Beach Soccer League
Winners:

Kfar Qassem BS Club (beach soccer)
Third title

== Awards ==
Best Player (MVP)
(Israel) Amer Yatim (Bnei "Falfala" Kfar Qassem)
Top Scorer
(Israel) Amer Yatim (Bnei "Falfala" Kfar Qassem)
13 goals
Best Coach
(Israel) Nimrod Kostika ("Landora" Bnei Yehuda "Nitzan")

== See also ==
- Israeli Beach Soccer League
