= Muha (surname) =

Muha is a surname. It may refer to:

- Ada Vidovič Muha (born 1940), Slovene linguist
- Asaf Ben-Muha (born 1985), Israeli association football player
- Joe Muha (1921–1993), American football player, coach and official
- Joey Muha (born 1992), Canadian drummer

== See also ==
- Mucha
