= Robertsganj Assembly constituency =

Constituency of the Uttar Pradesh legislative assembly in India

Coordinates: 24.68°N 83.06°E

Robertsganj
- Constituency No. 401 for the Uttar Pradesh Legislative Assembly

Constituency details
- Country: India
- Region: North India
- State: Uttar Pradesh
- District: Sonbhadra
- Reservation: None

Member of Legislative Assembly
- 18th Uttar Pradesh Legislative Assembly
- Incumbent Bhupesh Chaubey
- Party: Bharatiya Janata Party
- Elected year: 2022

Robertsganj is a constituency of the Uttar Pradesh Legislative Assembly covering the city of Robertsganj in the Sonbhadra district of Uttar Pradesh, India. It is one of five assembly constituencies in the Robertsganj Lok Sabha constituency.

== Members of the Legislative Assembly ==
Year	Member	Party
1957	Anand Brahma Shah	Indian National Congress
1957	Shobh Nath	Indian National Congress
1962	Ramnath Pathak	Indian National Congress
1967	Rup Narain	Indian National Congress
1969	Subedar Prasad	Bharatiya Jana Sangh
1974	Subedar Prasad	Bharatiya Jana Sangh
1977	Subedar Prasad	Janata Party
1980	Kallu Ram	Indian National Congress (I)
1985	Kallu Ram	Indian National Congress
1989	Teerath Raj	Bharatiya Janata Party
1991	Teerath Raj	Bharatiya Janata Party
1993	Teerath Raj	Bharatiya Janata Party
1996	Hari Prasad	Independent
2002	Parmeshwar Dayal	Samajwadi Party
2007	Satya Narayan Jaisal	Bahujan Samaj Party
2012	Avinash Kushwaha	Samajwadi Party
2017	Bhupesh Chaubey	Bharatiya Janata Party
2022	Bhupesh Chaubey	Bharatiya Janata Party

== Election results ==
=== 2027 ===
2027 Uttar Pradesh Legislative Assembly election: Robertsganj
Party	Candidate	Votes	%	±%
INDIA				
NDA				
BSP				
NOTA	None of the above			
Majority				
Turnout				
gain from		Swing		

=== 2022 ===
2022 Uttar Pradesh Legislative Assembly election: Robertsganj
Party	Candidate	Votes	%	±%
BJP	Bhupesh Chaubey	84,496	40.29	▼3.92
SP	Avinash Kushwaha	78,875	37.61	▲13.33
BSP	Avinash Shukla	32,887	15.68	▼3.66
CPI	Vijay Shanker Yadav	2,557	1.22	▼0.03
INC	Kamlesh Ojha	2,481	1.18	
NOTA	None of the above	3,612	1.72	▲1.15
Majority		5,621	2.68	▼17.25
Turnout		209,724	61.06	▼1.53
BJP hold				

=== 2017 ===
Bharatiya Janta Party candidate Bhupesh Chaubey won in 2017 Uttar Pradesh Legislative Elections by defeating Samajwadi Party candidate Avinash Kushwaha by a margin of 40,538 votes.

2017 Uttar Pradesh Legislative Assembly Election: Robertsgan
Party	Candidate	Votes	%	±%
BJP	Bhupesh Chaubey	89,932	44.21	
SP	Avinash Kushvaha	49,394	24.28	
BSP	Sunil Singh Yadav	39,336	19.34	
Independent	Prabhu Dayal	3,697	1.82	
GGP	Kailash Nath Prajapati	3,326	1.63	
CPI	Kali Prasad Dhangar	2,536	1.25	
Independent	Ramesh Dev Pandey	2,489	1.22	
RLD	Ch. Yashvant Patel	2,052	1.01	
NOTA	None of the above	1,163	0.57	
Majority		40,538	19.93	
Turnout		203,438	62.59	
