= Jan Mucha =

Jan or Ján Mucha is the name of:

- Jan Mucha (speedway rider) (1941–2014), Polish speedway rider
- Ján Mucha (footballer, born 1978), Slovak footballer
- Ján Mucha (ice hockey) (born 1984), Slovak ice hockey defenceman
- Ján Mucha (born 1982), Slovak football goalkeeper

== See also ==
- Mucha, surname page
