= Mukha =

Mukha may refer to:

- Mukha (1958 film), a Pakistani film
- Mukha (album), a 2006 studio album by Zubeen Garg
- Mukha (TV series), a Philippine television drama
- Mukha, an ABS CBN TV show focus on public affairs
- Mukha (game) or makha, a form of traditional Pashtun archery
- Museum of Modern Art, Antwerp, formerly known as MuKHA
- Mokha, Yemen, sometimes spelled Mukha

== See also ==
- Mucha
- Mukkha Fall, waterfall in India
