= Shiv Sampati Ram =

Indian politician

Member of Parliament Lok Sabha
- In office 1977-1980
- Preceded by: Ram Swarup
- Succeeded by: Ram Pyare Panika
- Constituency: Robertsganj (Uttar Pradesh)

Personal details
- Born: Mahuli Village, Mirzapur District, United Provinces, British India (now in Uttar Pradesh), India
- Party: Janata Party

Shiv Sampati Ram is an Indian politician. He was elected to the Lok Sabha the lower house of Indian Parliament from Robertsganj in Uttar Pradesh as a member of the Janata Party.
