= Bhai Lal =

Indian politician (1953–2020)

Member of the India Parliament
- In office 2007–2009
- Constituency: Robertganj

Personal details
- Born: 2 March 1953 Ghorawal, Sonbhadra, Uttar Pradesh
- Died: 9 August 2020 (aged 67)
- Party: Samajwadi Party
- Spouse: Ramdulari (died 2020)
- Children: 3 sons and 2 daughters
- As of 16 February, 2012

Bhai Lal (died 9 August 2020) was an Indian politician.

He served as the Member of Parliament for Robertganj from 2007 to 2009, representing the Samajwadi Party.

From 2012 to 2017 and 1996 until 2002 he was a member of the Uttar Pradesh Assembly, representing Chhanbey.
