= Mukkha Fall =

Mukkha Fall मुक्खा दरी
- Mukkha Water Fall
- Location within Uttar Pradesh
- Location: Munka, Sonbhadra, Uttar Pradesh, India; Near Ghorawal
- Coordinates: 24°42′56″N 82°41′47″E
- Type: Plunges
- Number of drops: 2
- Watercourse: Belan River

Mukkha Fall is situated on the Robertsganj to Ghorawal road, approximately 50 kilometres (31 mi) to the west of Robertsganj and 15 kilometres (9.3 mi) from Ghorawal, in the Sonbhadra district of Uttar Pradesh on the Belan River. It is a waterfall in Uttar Pradesh.

== Attractions ==
The water body lies close to a Devi Mandir and Karia Tal or the lake on the Belan River. It is one of the most magnificent waterfalls in the district. There are rock paintings called Lakhaniya Cave Paintings near Mukkha Fall in the cave which were drawn by Early Man.
