= Mucha =

Mucha (Czech: [ˈmuxa]; Polish: [ˈmuxa]; Czech and Slovak feminine: Muchová) is a Slavic surname, derived from mucha, meaning "fly". Mucha is the standard form for males in the Czech Republic and Slovakia, and for people of both genders in Poland. In other Slavic countries, the surname may appear as Mukha or Muha.

Mucha may refer to:

- Alphonse Mucha (1860–1939), Czech painter
- Anna Mucha (born 1980), Polish actress
- Barb Mucha (born 1961), American golfer
- Geraldine Mucha (1917–2012), British composer
- Ján Mucha (born 1982), Slovak football player
- Ján Mucha (footballer, born 1978), Slovak football player
- Ján Mucha (ice hockey) (born 1984), Slovak ice hockey player
- Jan Mucha (speedway rider) (1941–2014), Polish motorcyclist
- Jaroslava Muchová (1909–1986), Czech painter
- Jiří Mucha (1915–1991), Czech writer
- Joanna Mucha (born 1976), Polish politician
- Josef Mucha (born 1967), Czech football player
- Karolína Muchová (born 1996), Czech tennis player, daughter of Josef
- Kurtis Mucha (born 1989), Canadian ice hockey player
- Olive Mucha (1915–2006), American swimmer
- Robert Mucha (1890–1959), American boxer
- Rudy Mucha (1918–1982), American football player
- Viktor Mucha (1877–1919), Austrian doctor

== See also ==
- IS-2 Mucha, a single-seat training glider
- SZD-22 Mucha Standard, a single-seat glider
- Mucha (fly) a genus of flies in the family Sepsidae
