= 2024 Israeli Beach Soccer League =

Tournament details
- Host country: Israel
- Dates: 15 July – 19 July 2024
- Teams: 8 (from 1 confederation)
- Venue(s): 1 (in 1 host city)

Final positions
- Champions: Bnei "Falfala" Kfar Qassem (6th title)
- Runners-up: Hapoel "Towers" Hedera

Tournament statistics
- Matches played: 16
- Goals scored: 95 (5.94 per match)
- Top scorer(s): (Brazil) Bruno Xavier (8 goals)
- Best player(s): (Israel) Adir Danin

The 2024 Israeli Beach Soccer League was a national beach soccer league event that took place between 15 July and 19 July 2024, in Rishon LeZion, Israel.

Schedule of matches was published on the official Facebook page of Israeli Beach Soccer League.

The two teams that reach the final will jointly receive the right to participate in the European Champions Cup. As opposed to the two teams that will finish in last place at the group stage will play a test match in the next pre-season with the winner guaranteeing to stay in the league, while the loser will play another pre-season test match, this time against the winner of a preliminary tournament for teams that will ask to play in the league.

== Group stage ==
All kickoff times are of local time in Rishon LeZion, (UTC+02:00)

=== Group A ===
Pos	Team	Pld	W	D	L	GF	GA	+/-	Pts
1	F.C. "Yablonka" Tel Aviv	3	3	0	0	14	4	+10	9
2	Ironi Rosh HaAyin	3	2	0	1	9	6	+3	6
3	F.C. Hofim Rishon LeZion	3	1	0	2	5	12	−7	3
4	Beitar Jerusalem	3	0	0	3	4	10	−6	0

Clinched semifinal berth	Clinched relegation playoffs

15 July 2024
16:00

Beitar Jerusalem	1–5	F.C. "Yablonka" Tel Aviv

HaGolshim Beach, Rishon LeZion
15 July 2024
17:30

Ironi Rosh HaAyin	5–1	F.C. Hofim Rishon LeZion

HaGolshim Beach, Rishon LeZion

16 July 2024
16:45

F.C. "Yablonka" Tel Aviv	5–1	F.C. Hofim Rishon LeZion

HaGolshim Beach, Rishon LeZion
16 July 2024
18:15

Beitar Jerusalem	1–2	Ironi Rosh HaAyin

HaGolshim Beach, Rishon LeZion

17 July 2024
17:30

Beitar Jerusalem	2–3	F.C. Hofim Rishon LeZion

HaGolshim Beach, Rishon LeZion
17 July 2024
18:15

Ironi Rosh HaAyin	2–4	F.C. "Yablonka" Tel Aviv

HaGolshim Beach, Rishon LeZion

=== Group B ===
Pos	Team	Pld	W	D	L	GF	GA	+/-	Pts
1	Bnei "Falfala" Kfar Qassem	3	2	1	0	15	7	+8	7
2	Hapoel "Towers" Hedera	3	2	0	1	6	7	−1	6
3	Hapoel "Yermiyahu Zafririm" Holon	3	1	1	1	10	8	+2	4
4	Hapoel "Avisror Moshe & Sons" Be'er Sheva	3	0	0	3	7	16	−9	0

Clinched semifinal berth	Clinched relegation playoffs

15 July 2024
16:45

Hapoel "Yermiyahu Zafririm" Holon	2–3	Hapoel "Towers" Hedera

HaGolshim Beach, Rishon LeZion
15 July 2024
18:15

Hapoel "Avisror Moshe & Sons" Be'er Sheva	4–8	Bnei "Falfala" Kfar Qassem

HaGolshim Beach, Rishon LeZion

16 July 2024
16:00

Hapoel "Avisror Moshe & Sons" Be'er Sheva	1–3	Hapoel "Towers" Hedera

HaGolshim Beach, Rishon LeZion
16 July 2024
17:30

Hapoel "Yermiyahu Zafririm" Holon	3–3	Bnei "Falfala" Kfar Qassem

HaGolshim Beach, Rishon LeZion

17 July 2024
16:00

Hapoel "Towers" Hedera	0–4	Bnei "Falfala" Kfar Qassem

HaGolshim Beach, Rishon LeZion
17 July 2024
16:45

Hapoel "Yermiyahu Zafririm" Holon	5–2	Hapoel "Avisror Moshe & Sons" Be'er Sheva

HaGolshim Beach, Rishon LeZion

== Women's Israeli Beach Soccer League ==
In addition to the men's league, the inaugural women's tournament would take place between 4 women's beach soccer teams.

Semi-finals
18 July 2024
Hapoel Ironi Petah Tikva	2
ASA Tel Aviv	0
18 July 2024
F.C. Kiryat Gat	1
F.C. Hofim Rishon LeZion	4

Final
18 July 2024
Hapoel Ironi Petah Tikva	2
F.C. Hofim Rishon LeZion	3
Third place
18 July 2024
ASA Tel Aviv	2
F.C. Kiryat Gat	1

=== Semi-finals ===
18 July 2024
16:00

Hapoel Ironi Petah Tikva	2–0	ASA Tel Aviv

HaGolshim Beach, Rishon LeZion

18 July 2024
16:45

F.C. Kiryat Gat	1–4	F.C. Hofim Rishon LeZion

HaGolshim Beach, Rishon LeZion

=== Third place play-off ===
18 July 2024
17:30

ASA Tel Aviv	2–1	F.C. Kiryat Gat

HaGolshim Beach, Rishon LeZion

=== Final ===
18 July 2024
18:15

Hapoel Ironi Petah Tikva	2–3	F.C. Hofim Rishon LeZion

HaGolshim Beach, Rishon LeZion

== Knockout Stage ==
Semi-finals
19 July 2024
Bnei "Falfala" Kfar Qassem (p)	3 (4)
Ironi Rosh HaAyin	3 (1)
19 July 2024
F.C. "Yablonka" Tel Aviv	1
Hapoel "Towers" Hedera	4

Final
19 July 2024
Bnei "Falfala" Kfar Qassem	4
Hapoel "Towers" Hedera	2

=== Semi-finals ===
19 July 2024
14:00

Bnei "Falfala" Kfar Qassem	3–3 (a.e.t.)	Ironi Rosh HaAyin
Penalties
	4–1

HaGolshim Beach, Rishon LeZion

19 July 2024
14:50

F.C. "Yablonka" Tel Aviv	1–4	Hapoel "Towers" Hedera

HaGolshim Beach, Rishon LeZion

=== Survival match ===
19 July 2024
15:40

Beitar Jerusalem	6–2	Hapoel "Avisror Moshe & Sons" Be'er Sheva

HaGolshim Beach, Rishon LeZion

=== Final ===
19 July 2024
16:30

Bnei "Falfala" Kfar Qassem	4–2	Hapoel "Towers" Hedera

HaGolshim Beach, Rishon LeZion

== Winners ==
2024 Israeli Beach Soccer League
Winners:

Kfar Qassem BS Club (beach soccer)
Sixth title

== Awards ==
Best Player (MVP)
(Israel) Adir Danin (Hapoel "Towers" Hedera)
Top Scorer
(Brazil) Bruno Xavier (Bnei "Falfala" Kfar Qassem)
8 goals
Best Goalkeeper
(Switzerland) Eliott Mounoud (Bnei "Falfala" Kfar Qassem)

== See also ==
- Israeli Beach Soccer League
