= Chhanbey Assembly constituency =

Constituency of the Uttar Pradesh legislative assembly in India

Coordinates: 25.15°N 82.39°E

Chhanbey
- Constituency No. 395 for the Uttar Pradesh Legislative Assembly

Constituency details
- Country: India
- Region: North India
- State: Uttar Pradesh
- District: Mirzapur
- Lok Sabha constituency: Mirzapur
- Total electors: 3,74,291
- Reservation: SC

Member of Legislative Assembly
- 18th Uttar Pradesh Legislative Assembly
- Incumbent Rinki Kol
- Party: AD(S)
- Alliance: NDA
- Elected year: 2023

Chhanbey is a constituency of the Uttar Pradesh Legislative Assembly covering the city of Chhanbey in the Mirzapur district of Uttar Pradesh, India.

Chhanbey is one of five assembly constituencies in the Mirzapur Lok Sabha constituency. Since 2008, this assembly constituency is numbered 395 amongst 403 constituencies.

== Members of Legislative Assembly ==
Year	Member	Party
1967	Brahmanand Shastri	Bharatiya Jana Sangh
1969	Sriniwas Prasad Singh	Indian National Congress
1974	Purushottam Das	Indian National Congress
1977	Purushottam Das	Indian National Congress
1980	Purushottam Das	Indian National Congress (I)
1985	Bhagwati Prasad	Indian National Congress
1989	Kalicharan	Janata Dal
1991	Dulare Lal	Janata Dal
1993	Sriram Pasi	Bahujan Samaj Party
1996	Bhai Lal Kol	Bharatiya Janata Party
2002	Pakaudi Lal Kol	Bahujan Samaj Party
2004^	Sriram Bharti	Bahujan Samaj Party
2007	Suryabhan	Bahujan Samaj Party
2012	Bhai Lal Kol	Samajwadi Party
2017	Rahul Prakash	Apna Dal (Soneylal)
2022	Rahul Prakash	Apna Dal (Soneylal)
2023^	Rinki Kol	Apna Dal (Soneylal)

== Election results ==
=== 2027 ===
2027 Uttar Pradesh Legislative Assembly election: Chhanbey
Party	Candidate	Votes	%	±%
INDIA				
NDA				
BSP				
NOTA	None of the above			
Majority				
Turnout				
gain from		Swing		

=== 2023 bypoll ===
Rinki Kol of the Apna Dal(Sonelal) party emerged as the winner with a margin of over 9,587 votes against her closest rival, Keerti Kol of the Samajwadi Party.

2023 Uttar Pradesh Legislative Assembly by-election: Chhanbey
Party	Candidate	Votes	%	±%
AD(S)	Rinki Kol	76,203	46.70	−0.59
SP	Kirti Kol	66616	40.82	+11.11
RSPS	Shiv Pujan	3192	1.96	
INC	Ajay Kumar	2541	1.56	
Independent	Bheemrav	4637	2.84	
Independent	Arjun	4012	2.46	
NOTA	None of the Above	2459	1.51	
Majority		9,587	5.87	
Turnout		163193		
AD(S) hold		Swing		

=== 2022 ===
2022 Uttar Pradesh Legislative Assembly election: Chhanbey
Party	Candidate	Votes	%	±%
AD(S)	Rahul Prakash Kol	102,502	47.29	−2.3
SP	Kirti Kol	64,389	29.71	+12.51
BSP	Dhaneshwar	32,145	14.83	−5.35
INC	Bhagwati Prasad Chaudhary	3,935	1.82	
RSPS	Shiv Pujan	3,230	1.49	+0.53
BMP	Saroj Sargam	3,035	1.4	+0.67
Jan Adhikar Party	Sarvesh Kumar	2,591	1.2	
NOTA	None of the above	3,224	1.49	−0.59
Majority		38,113	17.58	−11.83
Turnout		216,739	57.91	−2.5
AD(S) hold		Swing		

=== 2017 ===
Apna Dal (Sonelal) candidate Rahul Prakash won in 2017 Uttar Pradesh Legislative Elections defeating Bahujan Samaj Party candidate Dhaneswar by a margin of 63,468 votes.

2017 Uttar Pradesh Legislative Assembly Election: Chhanbe
Party	Candidate	Votes	%	±%
AD(S)	Rahul Prakash	107,007	49.59	
BSP	Dhaneshwar	43,539	20.18	
SP	Bhai Lal	37,108	17.2	
NISHAD	Saroj Sargam	15,095	6.99	
RSPS	Sushil Kumar	2,064	0.96	
NOTA	None of the above	4,397	2.08	
Majority		63,468	29.41	
Turnout		215,798	60.41	
