= Ram Shakal =

Indian politician (born 1963)

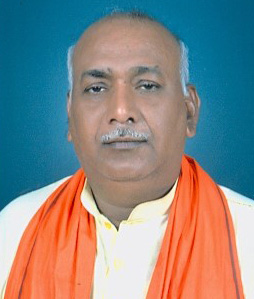

Member of Parliament, Rajya Sabha
- In office 14 July 2018 – 23 July 2024
- Preceded by: Rekha
- Succeeded by: C. Sadanandan Master
- Constituency: Nominated (Social work)

Member of Parliament, Lok Sabha
- In office 1996–2004
- Preceded by: Ram Nihor Rai
- Succeeded by: Lal Chandra Kol
- Constituency: Robertsganj

Personal details
- Born: 21 March 1963 (age 62) Shilpi, Sonbhadra, Uttar Pradesh
- Party: Bharatiya Janata Party
- Spouse: Shivpati Devi (m. 1983)
- Children: 2 sons Abhay, Umesh & 1 daughter Nidhi
- Parents: Raja Ram (father); Nawabi Devi (mother)
- Education: M.A.
- Alma mater: Gorakhpur University

Ram Shakal (born 21 March 1963) is an Indian politician. He was a nominated member of the Rajya Sabha, the upper house of the Parliament of India. He was elected to the Lok Sabha, and the lower house of Indian Parliament from Robertsganj in Uttar Pradesh in 1996, 1998 and 1999 as a member of the Bharatiya Janata Party(BJP)
