= Rinki Kol =

Indian politician

Member of the Uttar Pradesh Legislative Assembly
- Incumbent
- Assumed office 13 May 2023
- Preceded by: Rahul Prakash
- Constituency: Chhanbey

Personal details
- Party: Apna Dal (Sonelal)
- Other political affiliations: National Democratic Alliance (2023–present)
- Spouse: Rahul Prakash
- Relations: Pakaudi Lal Kol (father-in-law)

Rinki Kol (born 1989) is an Indian politician who has been serving as a Member of the Uttar Pradesh Legislative Assembly from the Chhanbey Assembly constituency since 13 May 2023 being associated with the Apna Dal (Sonelal). She is wife of former Member of Legislative Assembly Rahul Prakash Kol.
