= Ghorawal Assembly constituency =

Constituency of the Uttar Pradesh legislative assembly in India

Coordinates: 24.75°N 82.78°E

Ghorawal
- Constituency No. 400 for the Uttar Pradesh Legislative Assembly

Constituency details
- Country: India
- Region: North India
- State: Uttar Pradesh
- District: Sonbhadra
- Total electors: 3,94,231
- Reservation: None

Member of Legislative Assembly
- 18th Uttar Pradesh Legislative Assembly
- Incumbent Anil Kumar Maurya
- Party: Bharatiya Janta Party
- Elected year: 2017

Ghorawal is a constituency of the Uttar Pradesh Legislative Assembly covering the city of Ghorawal in the Sonbhadra district of Uttar Pradesh, India.

Ghorawal is one of five assembly constituencies in the Robertsganj Lok Sabha constituency. Since 2008, this assembly constituency is numbered 400 amongst 403 constituencies.

== Members of the Legislative Assembly ==
Year	Member	Party
Till 2012 : Constituency did not exist
2012	Ramesh Chandra Dubey	Samajwadi Party
2017	Anil Kumar Maurya	Bharatiya Janata Party
2022	Anil Kumar Maurya	Bharatiya Janata Party

== Election results ==
=== 2027 ===
2027 Uttar Pradesh Legislative Assembly election: Ghorawal
Party	Candidate	Votes	%	±%
INDIA				
NDA				
BSP				
NOTA	None of the above			
Majority				
Turnout				
gain from		Swing		

=== 2022 ===
2022 Uttar Pradesh Legislative Assembly election: Ghorawal
Party	Candidate	Votes	%	±%
BJP	Anil Kumar Maurya	101,277	40.46	▼7.36
SP	Ramesh Chandra Dubey	77,355	30.9	▲7.2
BSP	Mohan Singh Kushwaha	46,941	18.75	▼3.46
INC	Videshwari Singh Rathore	10,377	4.15	
Independent	Rajesh Kumar	2,929	1.17	
NOTA	None of the above	4,482	1.79	▼0.44
Majority		23,922	9.56	▼14.56
Turnout		250,342	63.5	▼1.78
BJP hold		Swing		

=== 2017 ===
Bharatiya Janta Party candidate Anil Kumar Maurya won in 2017 Uttar Pradesh Legislative Elections defeating Samajwadi Party candidate Ramesh Chandra by a margin of 57,649 votes.

2017 Uttar Pradesh Legislative Assembly election: Ghorawal
Party	Candidate	Votes	%	±%
BJP	Anil Kumar Maurya	114,305	47.82	
SP	Ramesh Chandra Dubey	56,656	23.7	
BSP	Beena Singh	53,090	22.21	
NOTA	None of the above	5,225	2.23	
Majority		57,649	24.12	
Turnout		239,030	65.28	
