= Chhotelal Kharwar =

Indian politician

Member of Parliament, Lok Sabha
- Incumbent
- Assumed office 4 June 2024
- Preceded by: Pakaudi Lal Kol
- In office 16 May 2014 – 23 May 2019
- Preceded by: Pakaudi Lal Kol
- Succeeded by: Pakaudi Lal Kol
- Constituency: Robertsganj

Personal details
- Born: 15 September 1972 (age 53) Chandauli, Uttar Pradesh, India
- Party: Samajwadi Party (2024-present)
- Other political affiliations: Bharatiya Janata Party (2014-2024)
- Spouse: Muniya Devi (m. 1988)
- Children: 2 sons, 4 daughters
- Parents: Ramdhani (father); Udasi Devi (mother)
- Occupation: Agriculturist

Chhotelal Kharwar is a member of the Samajwadi Party. He won the 2014 Indian general elections from the Robertsganj constituency on a BJP ticket. He was a National Council member of the Bharatiya Janata Party from Sonbhadra. He recontested and won again in Robertsganj in the 2024 Indian general elections on a Samajwadi Party ticket.
