= Mucha Museum (Savarin Palace) =

Art museum in Prague, Czech Republic

- Muchovo muzeum
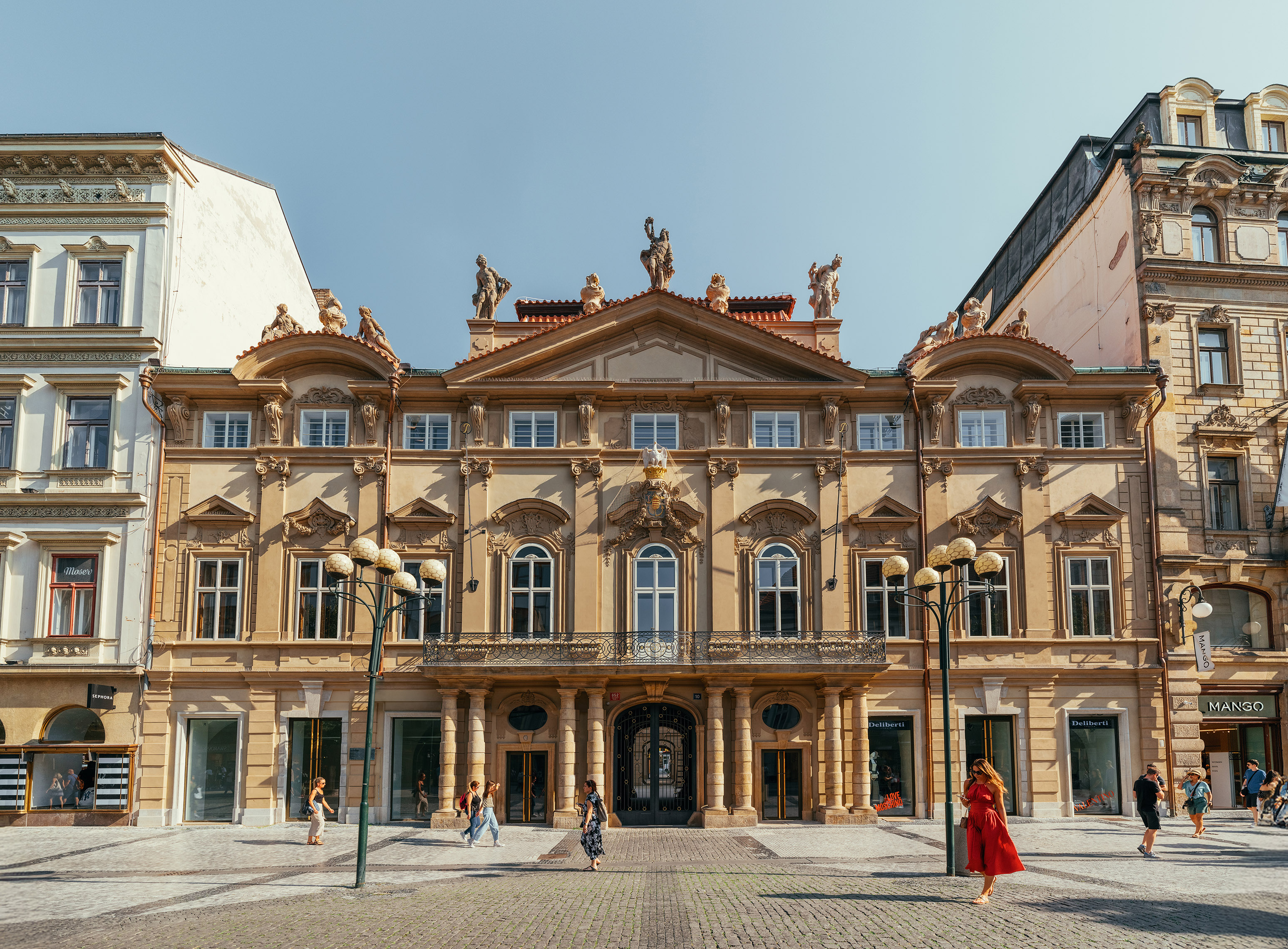
- Savarin Palace
- Established: 14 February 2025
- Location: Savarin Palace, Prague, Czech Republic
- Coordinates: 50°5′6″N 14°25′30″E
- Type: Art museum
- Website: www.mucha.eu

The Mucha Museum is a museum in Prague, Czech Republic, housing a collection of works by Alphonse Mucha. It is operated by the Mucha Foundation.

== History ==
Having operated in Kounice Palace since 1998, the Mucha Foundation sought to find a new location for the gallery, as the size of the old premises caused crowding issues. The chosen site was a section of the historic Savarin Palace, double the size of the previous site. The Palace Complex was being renovated by real estate developer Crestyl, led by architect Thomas Heatherwick. The section of the palace occupied by the Mucha Museum was remodeled by Czech architect Eva Jiřičná. The museum opened on February 14, 2025, after several delays.

=== Dispute with Kounice Palace museum ===
Sebastian Pawlowski, director of the Mucha Museum in Kounice Palace stated that he would not be moving location, and the Savarin Palace location was a separate project. By May 2024, the Mucha Foundation had fully cut ties with Pawlowski, and stated any exhibitions at the Mucha Museum in Kounice Palace were unauthorized. The Mucha Foundation claimed that they terminated their contract with Pawlowski, who they state owed several million koruna and had kept the paintings in conditions which could have damaged them.

The termination of the contract triggered several intellectual property disputes, as the Mucha Foundation claims it was what allowed the museum to use its name. Pawlowski stated "it is probably for the new place in Palace Savarin to wonder if it has the right to call itself the same as the original", while Mucha Foundation representative Simona Kordova claims that Pawlowski is breaking the law.

== Collection ==
The first exhibition at the museum is titled "Art Nouveau and Utopia", overseen by Eva Jiricna and designed by Tomoko Sato. Notable works include Princess Hyacinth, the Seasons cycle, and Zodiac.

== Gallery ==
Selected works
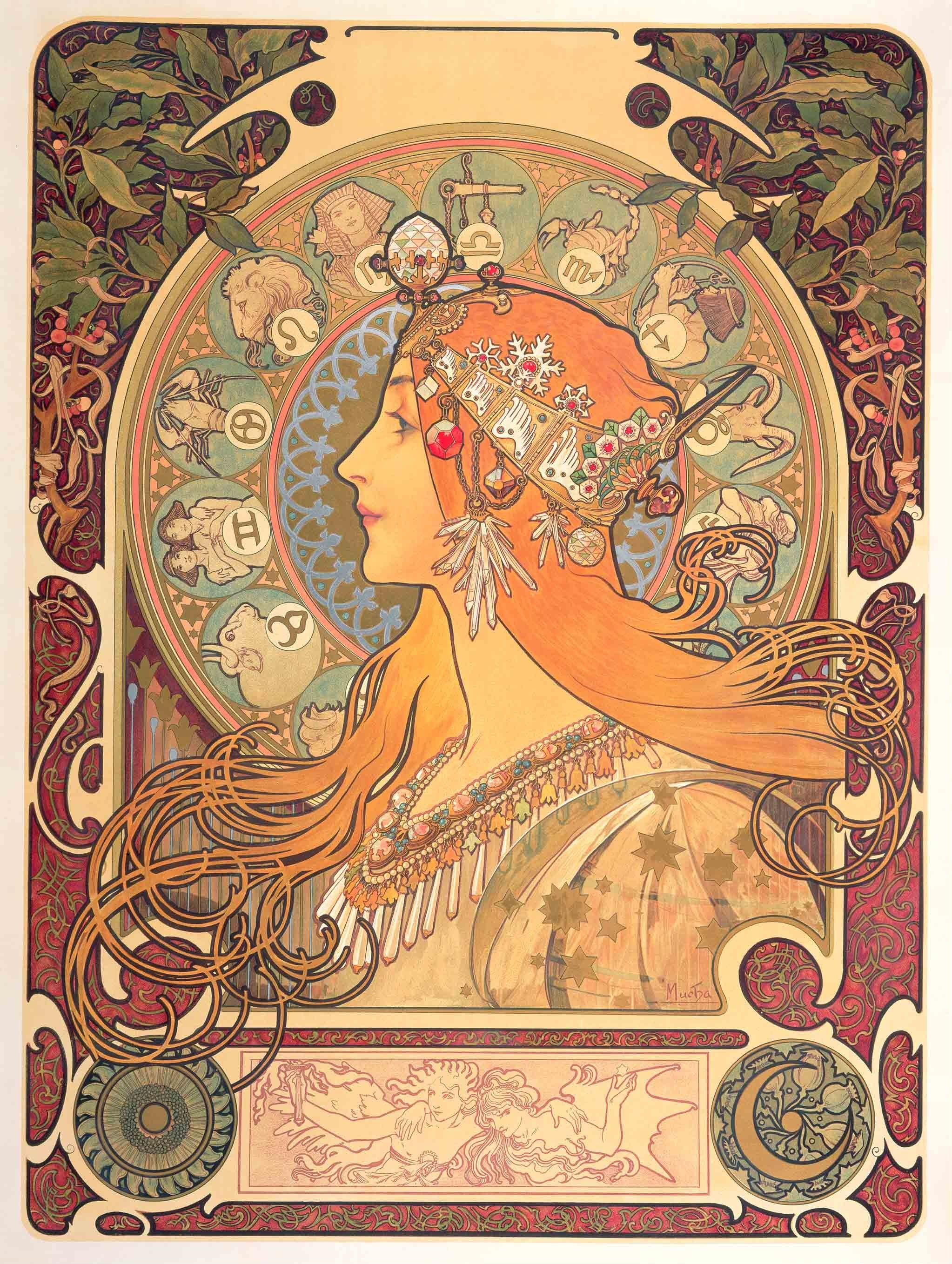
Zodiac, 1869

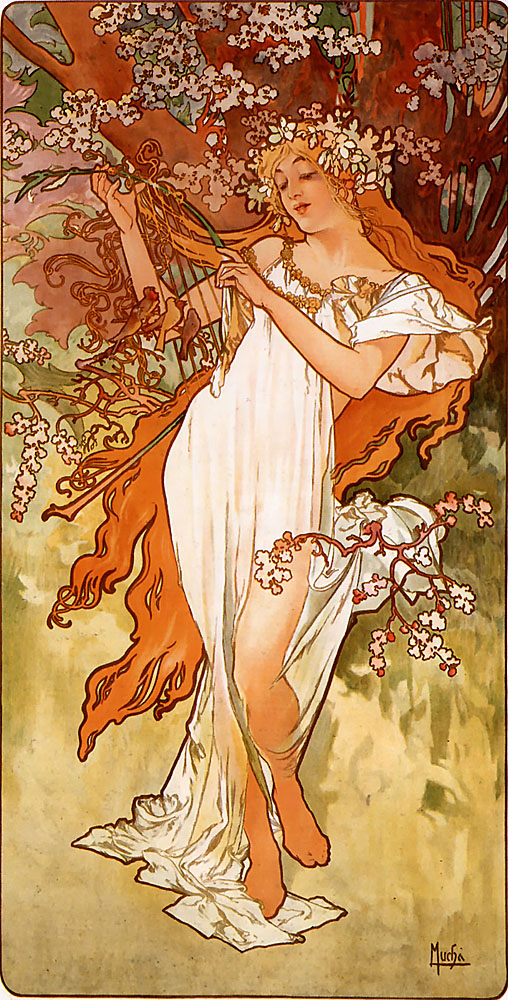
Spring, 1896

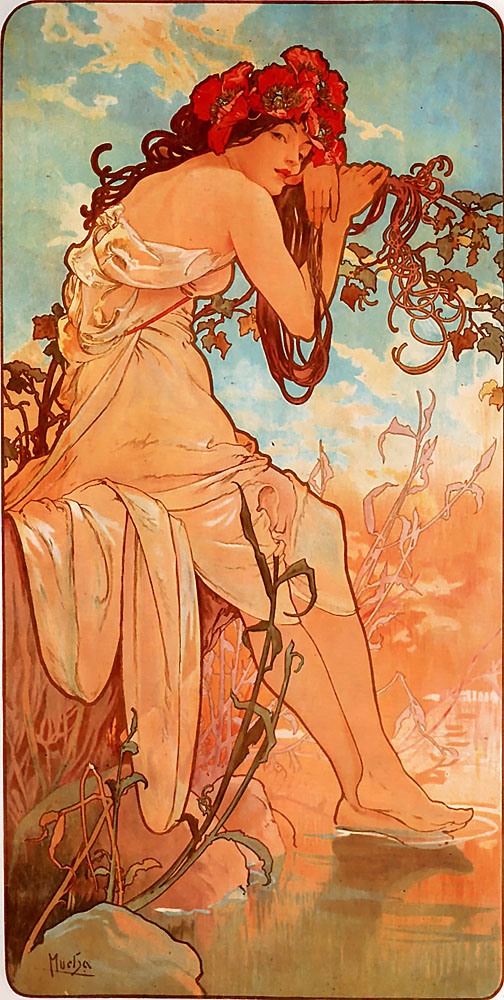
Summer, 1896

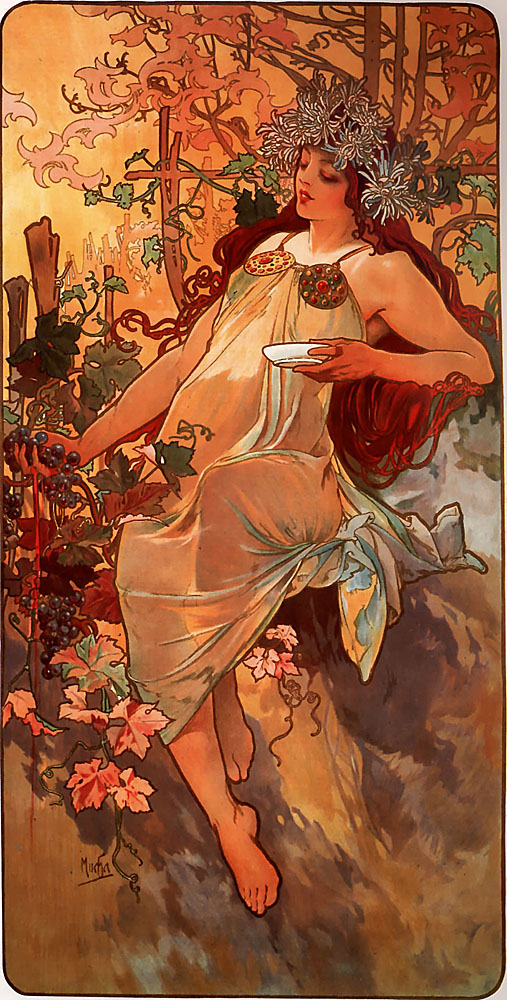
Autumn, 1896

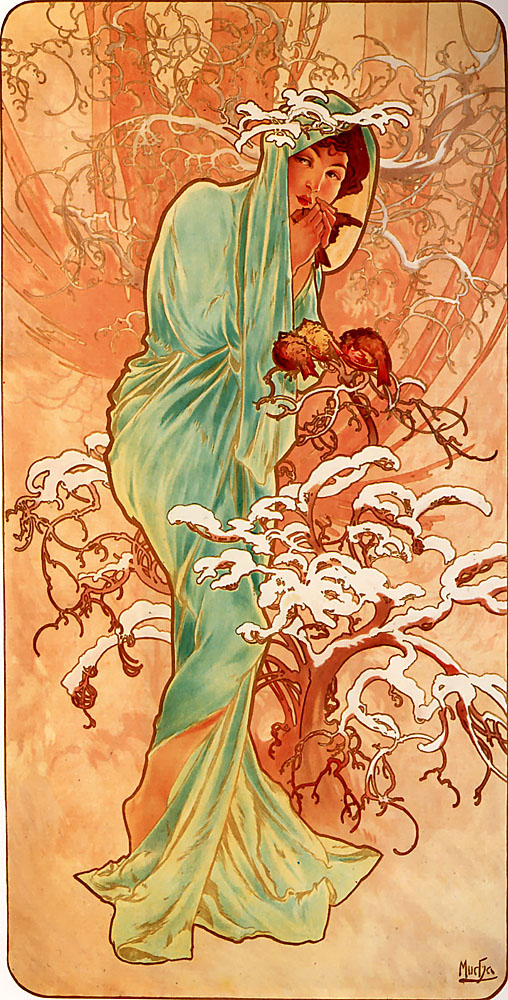
Winter, 1896

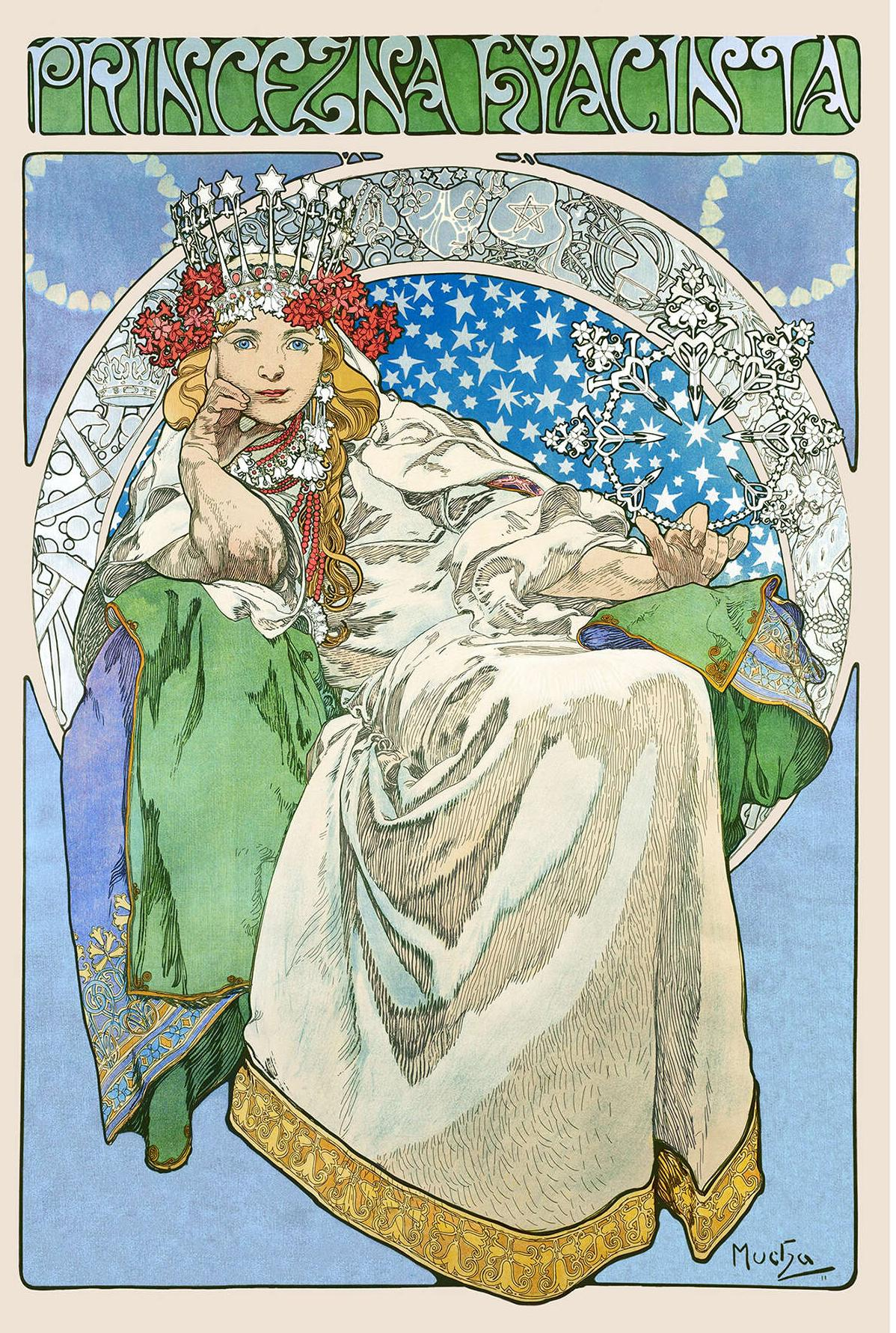
Princess Hyacinth, 1911
