= Ram Nihor Rai =

Indian politician (born 1934)

Member of Parliament, Lok Sabha
- In office 1991–1996
- Preceded by: Subedar Prasad
- Succeeded by: Ram Shakal
- Constituency: Robertsganj (Uttar Pradesh)

Personal details
- Born: 1 February 1934 Godhna Village, Mirzapur, United Provinces, British India (present-day Uttar Pradesh, India)
- Party: Janata Dal
- Spouse: Chhohgari Devi
- Children: 3 daughters(durga devi,prabhavti devi,indra devi)

Ram Nihor Rai (also spelt as Ram Nihore, born 1 February 1934) is an Indian politician belonging to the Janata Dal. He was elected to the Lok Sabha the lower house of Indian Parliament from Robertsganj in Uttar Pradesh in 1991.
