= Anil Kumar Maurya =

Indian politician

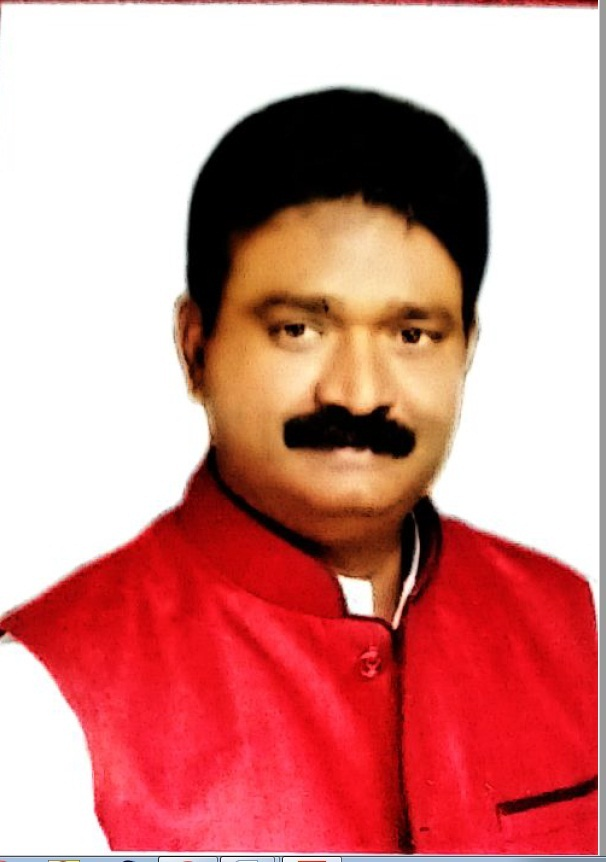

Member of Uttar Pradesh Legislative Assembly
- Incumbent
- Assumed office 2017
- Preceded by: Ramesh Gautam
- Constituency: Ghorawal
- In office 2002–2012
- Preceded by: Lokpati Tripathi
- Succeeded by: Constituency defunct
- Constituency: Rajgarh

Personal details
- Born: 20 October 1969 (age 56) Varanasi, Varanasi district, Uttar Pradesh
- Party: Bharatiya Janata Party
- Other political affiliations: Bahujan Samaj Party (till 2016)
- Spouse: Rani Maurya (m. 1990)
- Children: 1 son, 3 daughters
- Parent: Sriram Maurya (father)

Dr. Anil Maurya is an Indian politician and a member of 17th Legislative Assembly, Uttar Pradesh of India. He represents the Ghorawal constituency in Sonbhadra district of Uttar Pradesh. He is a member of the Bharatiya Janata Party.

== Early life ==
Anil Kumar Maurya was born on 20 October 1969 in Akatha village of Varanasi district of Uttar Pradesh. He got his early education at his native village. He completed his Ph.D. in 2008 from Mahatma Gandhi Kashi Vidyapeeth, Varanasi. He started taking part in political activities during studies in Kashi Vidyapeeth.

== Political career ==
Anil Kumar Maurya was elected as Member of Uttar Pradesh legislative assembly from Rajnagar assembly seat in Mirzapur in 2007 as a Bahujan Samaj Party candidate. However he lost his second election in 2012. He was expelled from BSP in 2016 for alleged anti-party activities. After expulsion from BSP, Maurya joined Bharatiya Janata Party. He got elected again as MLA from Ghorawal assembly seat in Sonbhadra district in 2017 defeating his close contestant Ramesh Chandra from Samajwadi Party with a margin of 57,649 votes.

== Posts held ==
#	From	To	Position	Constituency
01	2007	2012	Member, 15th Legislative Assembly	Rajgarh
02	2017	Incumbent	Member, 17th Legislative Assembly	Ghorawal
