= Jaroslava Muchová =

Czechoslovak painter, daughter of Alphonse Mucha

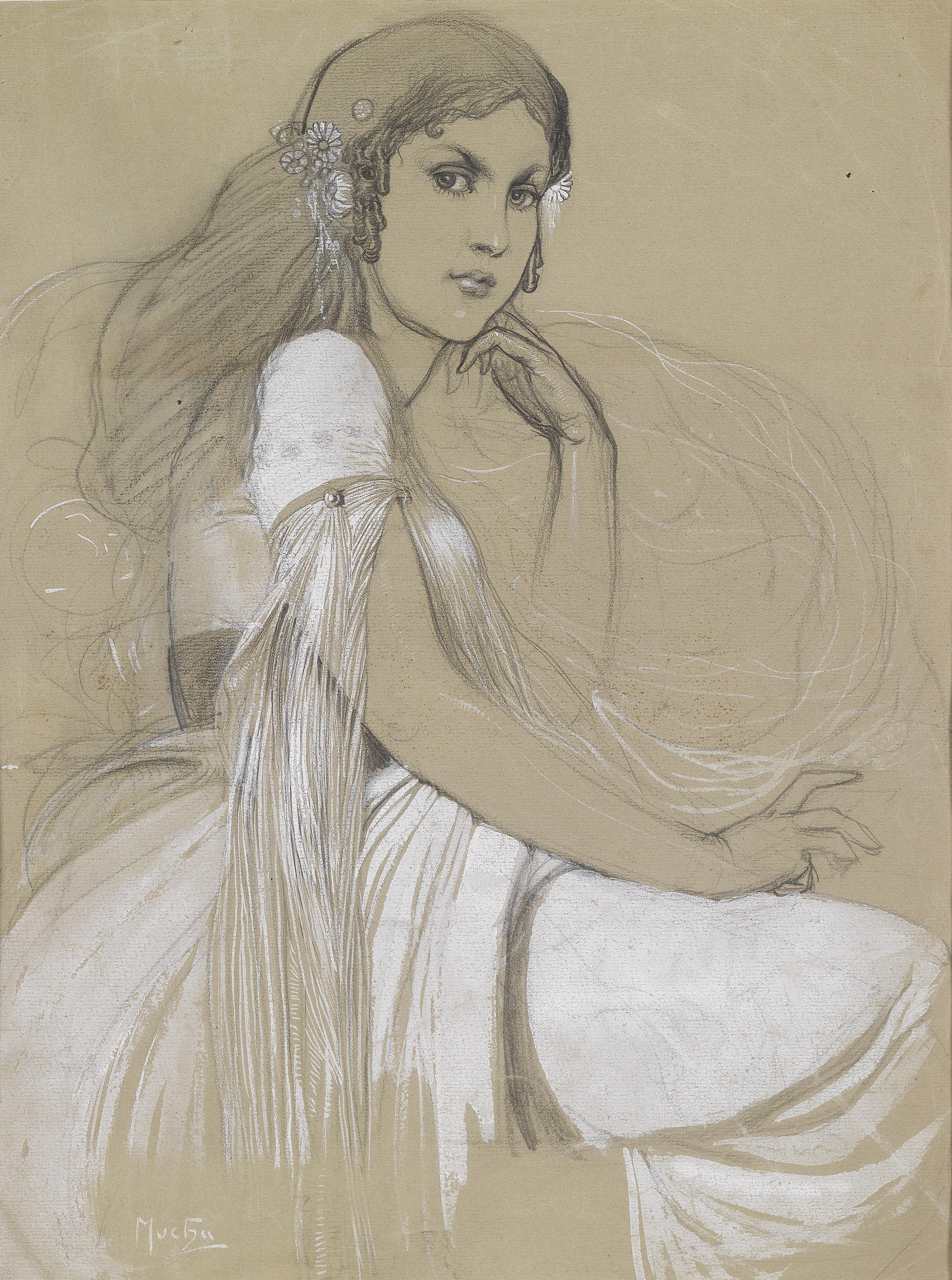
Jaroslava Muchová in a sketch by her father, Alphonse Mucha, c. 1920s

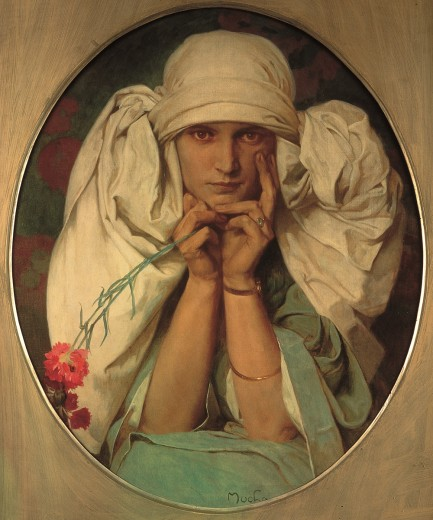
Jaroslava Muchová, by Alphonse Mucha

Jaroslava Muchová Syllabová (15 March 1909 – 9 November 1986) was a Czech painter, the daughter of painter Alphonse Mucha and the sister of writer and translator Jiří Mucha.

== Biography ==
Muchová was born in New York on 15 March 1909. Her parents were in the United States while her father tried unsuccessfully to raise funds to support his penultimate project The Slav Epic (Czech: Slovanská epopej).

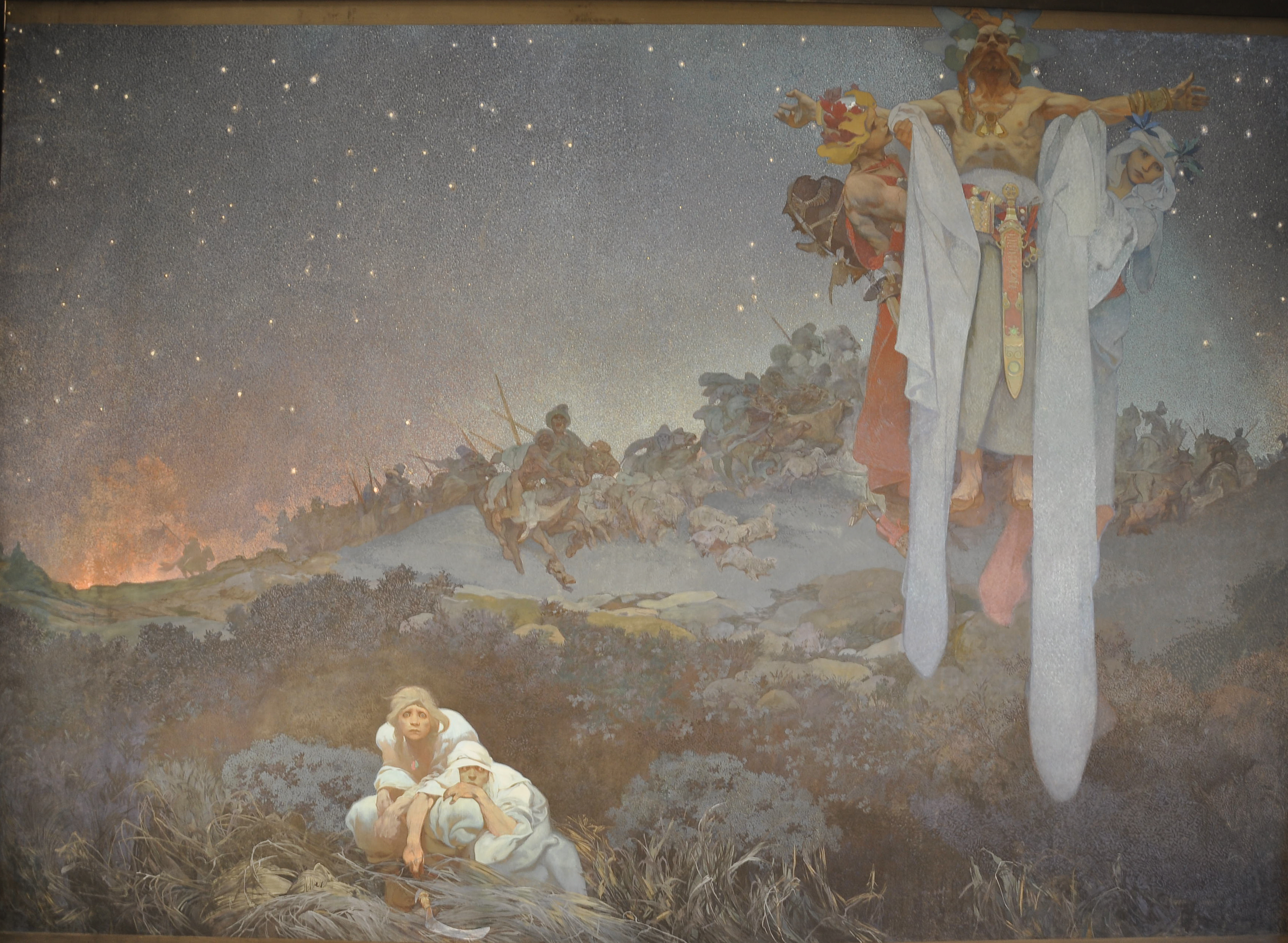
Slavs in their Original Homeland

As a child she studied ballet, but eventually followed in the footsteps of her father: she assisted in the creation of the Slav Epic by mixing colours and tracing detail studies onto the giant canvases ready for painting. She was responsible for painting the entire starry sky of Slavs in their Original Homeland: Between the Turanian Whip and the sword of the Goths (Czech: Slované v pravlasti: Mezi turanskou knutou a mečem Gótů). She also modelled for several of the figures that appear in the series.

After World War II, she took on the restoration of works from the Slav Epic that had been damaged by frost and water when they were stored away to hide them from the Nazis.

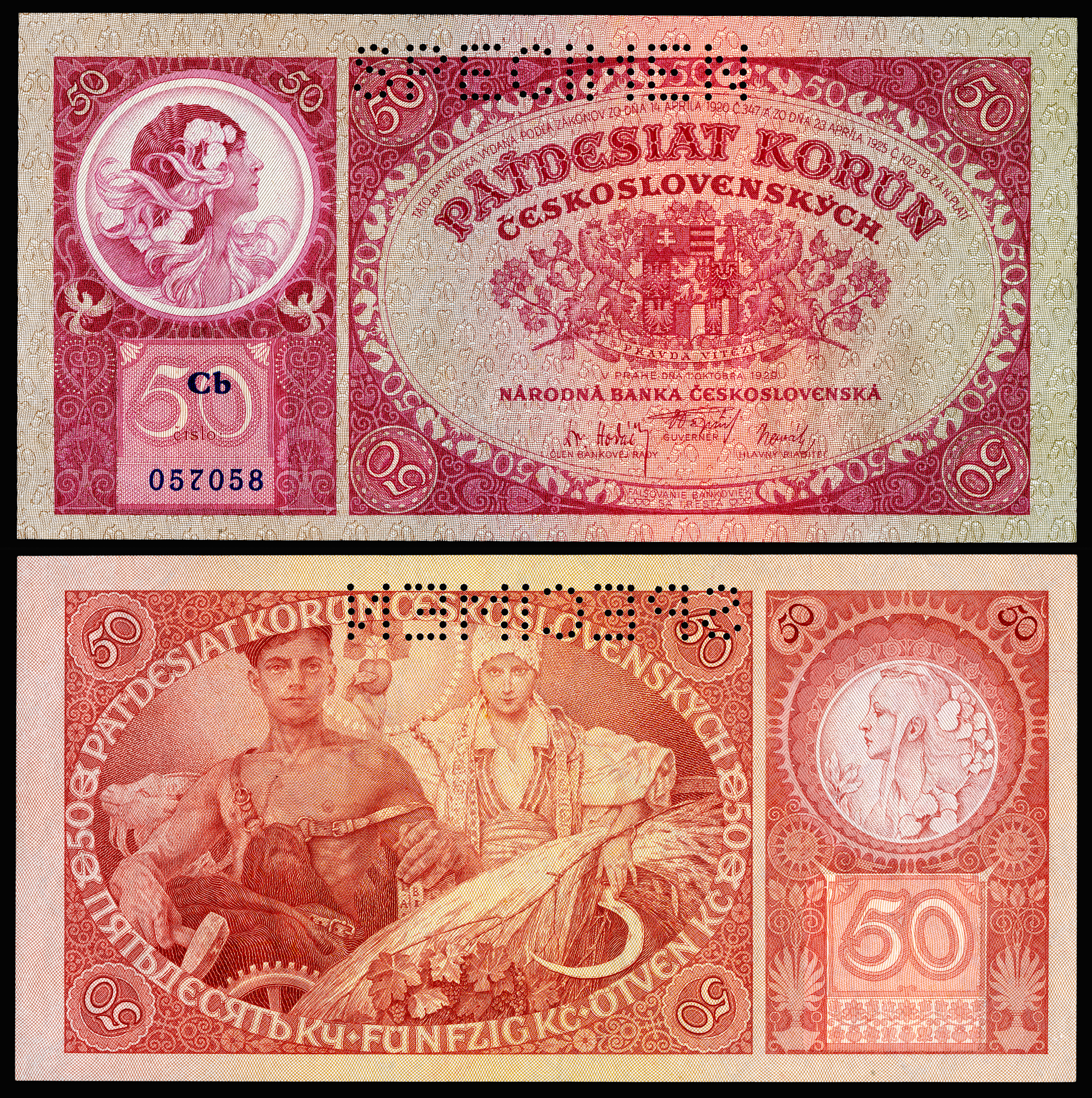
Jaroslava Muchová (by Alphonse Mucha) depicted on the 1929 50 koruna banknote.

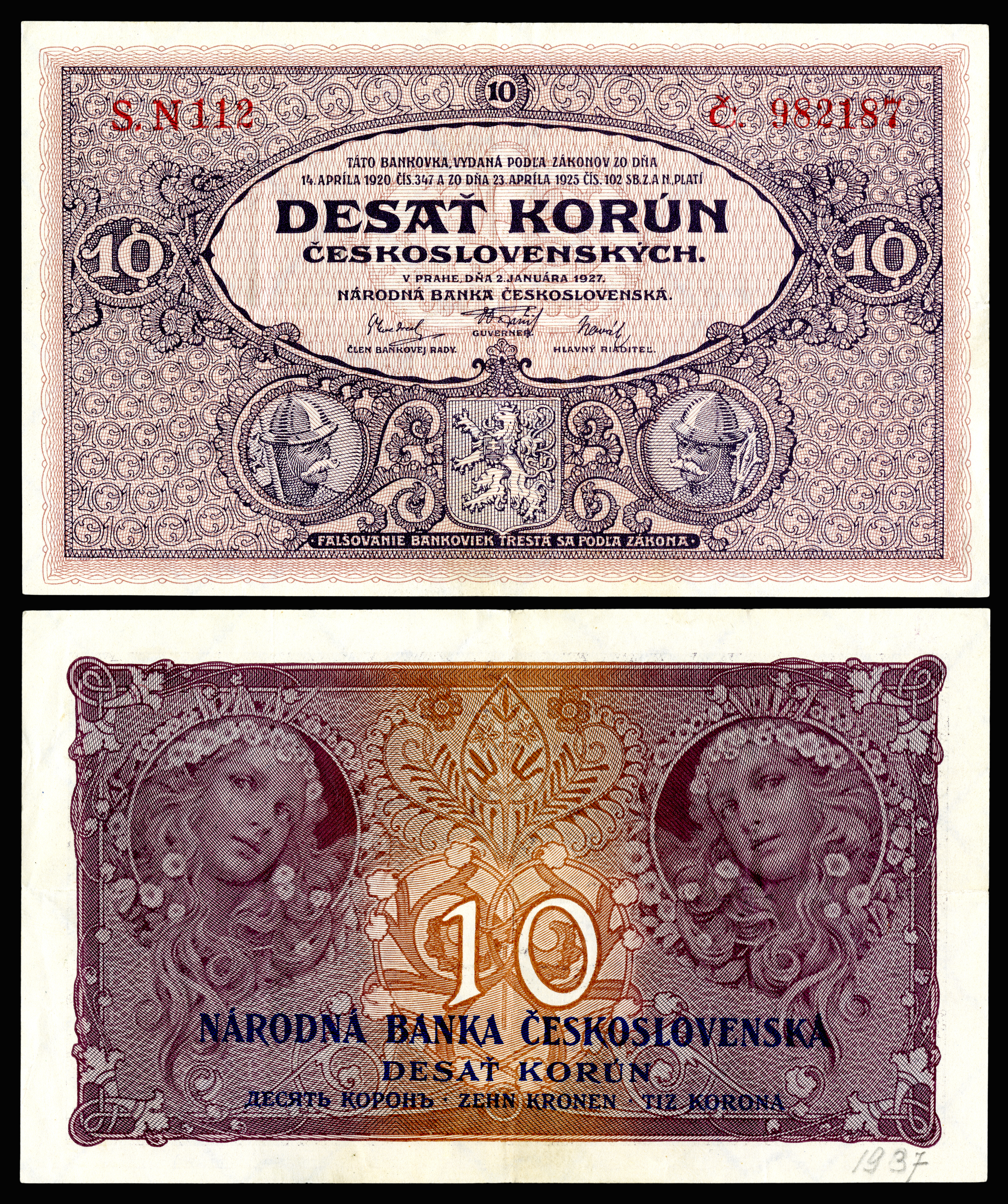
10 koruna banknote

Alphonse Mucha pictured her on the reverse of the first Czechoslovak ten koruna banknote from 1919, and later on the 1929 50 koruna banknote.

She died 9 November 1986 in Prague, Czechoslovakia.

== Sources ==
- Cuhaj, George S., ed. (2010). Standard Catalog of World Paper Money General Issues (1368–1960) (13th ed.). Krause. ISBN 978-1-4402-1293-2. Archived from the original on 26 April 2017.
- Mucha, Jiří (1998). Alphonse Maria Mucha: His Life and Art. Random House Incorporated. p. 300. ISBN 9780847810192.
