= Kubari Patehara =

Village in Uttar Pradesh, India

Kubari Patehara is a village in Mirzapur, Uttar Pradesh, India.
