= Bhaiswar =

Village in Uttar Pradesh, India

Bhaiswar is a village in Satna, Madhya Pradesh, India.
