= Jiří Mucha =

Czech writer (1915–1991)

- Jiří Mucha (1915–91)
- Born: 12 March 1915; Prague
- Died: 5 April 1991 (aged 76); Prague
- Occupations: Journalist, writer, screenwriter, author
- Notable work: Za mořem, Ugle a cesta na konec světa, Most

Jiří Mucha (12 March 1915 in Prague – 5 April 1991 in Prague) was a Czech journalist, writer, screenwriter, author of autobiographical novels and studies of the works of his father, the painter Alphonse Mucha.

== Life ==
Born in Prague, he was working in Paris as a correspondent for Lidové noviny when Nazi Germany occupied the rest of Czechoslovakia on 15 March 1939. It was at this time he wrote the Czech libretto for Martinů's Field Mass. He returned to Prague briefly for his father's funeral in July of the same year but was able to return to Paris and later joined the newly formed 1st Czechoslovak Division in France in Agde. Following the fall of France, Mucha made his way to the United Kingdom, where he joined the Royal Air Force before becoming a war correspondent for the BBC, where he was known as George Mucha. He returned to Prague in 1945. In 1951 he was arrested by the country's Communist government for alleged espionage, and following the demands of the state prosecutor for the death penalty, he was ultimately sentenced to hard labor in the Jáchymov uranium mines. He was released from prison in 1955, allegedly due to the efforts of his wife Geraldine, but according to other records, it was due to his agreement to work for the State Security Police (StB). In 1989, following the Velvet Revolution, which brought down the communist regime, he became chairman of the Czech PEN club. He died of cancer in 1991.

== Family ==
His first wife was Czech composer Vítězslava Kaprálová (1915–40). His second wife was Geraldine Thomson-Mucha (1917–2012), a Scottish born composer who lived in Prague until her death on 12 October 2012. Mucha had two children: a son, John, now President of the Mucha Foundation, with his wife Geraldine, and a daughter, Jarmila Plocková, with Vlasta Plocková.

Painter Jaroslava Muchová was his sister.

== Work ==
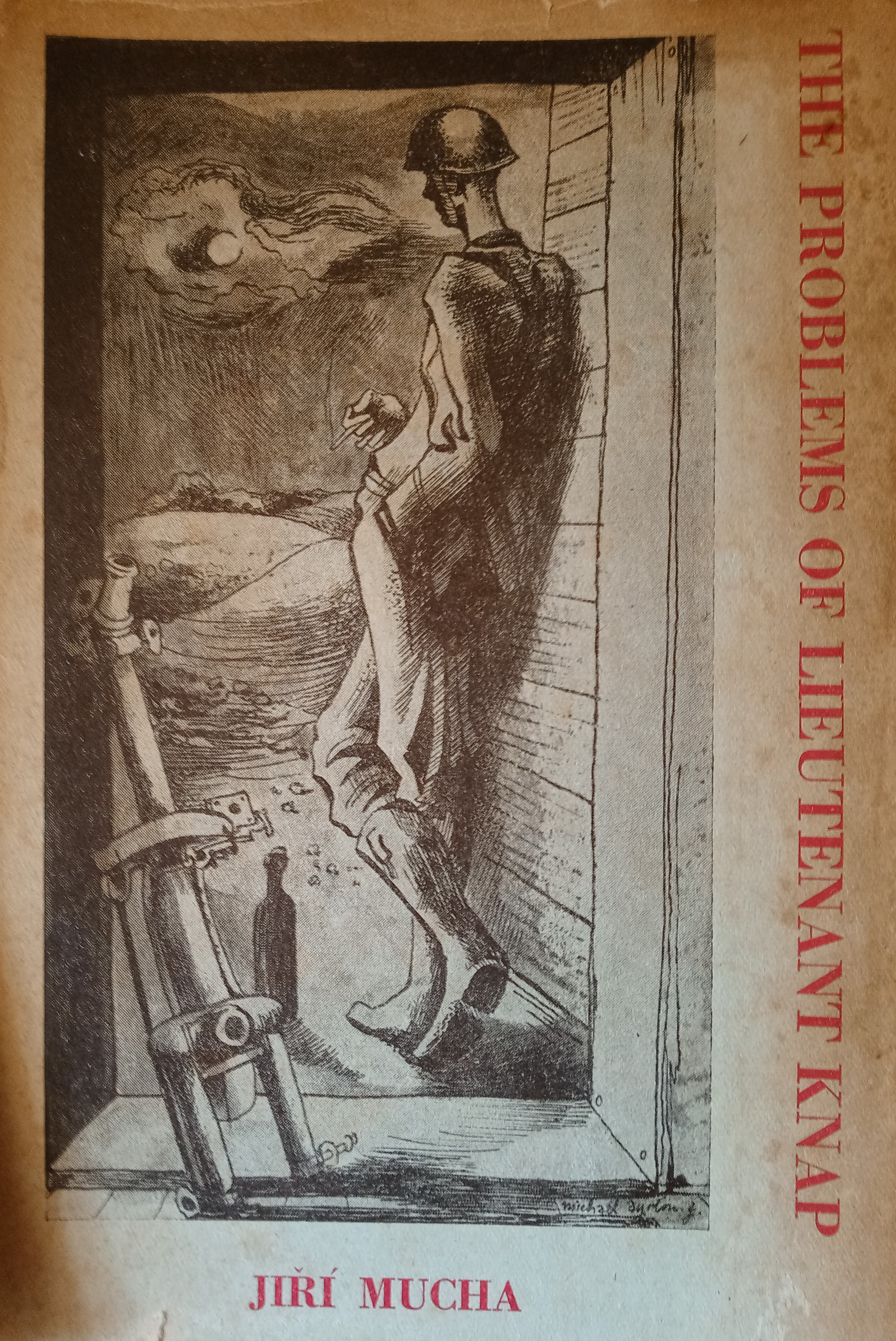
UK 1st edition cover, 1945

- Za mořem (1932)
- Ugle a cesta na konec světa (1941)
- Most (1943)
- Problémy nadporučíka Knapa (1945) (first published in English as The Problems of Lieutenant Knap)
- Oheň proti ohni (1947)
- Spálená setba (1948)
- Skleněná stěna (1949)
- Válka pokračuje (1949)
- Čím zraje čas (1958)
- Pravděpodobná tvář (1963)
- Černý a bílý New York (1965)
- Ninety Degrees in the Shade (1965)
- Alfons Mucha (1965) first published as Kankán se svatozáří (published in English in 1966)
- Studené slunce (1967) (first published in English)
- Marieta v noci (1969)
- Llydova hlava (1987)
- Podivné lásky [Au seuil de la nuit] (in French), 1991 [1988].
- Věčná zahrada (1994)

Some of Mucha's novels are autobiographical, e.g. Most [The Bridge], Studené slunce [Cold Sun] – reflecting his experience of a life in Stalinist prison – and Podivné lásky [Strange Loves] – his recollections of his relationship with Czech composer Vítězslava Kaprálová and the life of a Czech émigré community in Paris at the dawn of the World War II.

== Bibliography ==
- Sarvas, Rostislav. "Hedvabny kanibal." Reflex 4 (1992): 30–34.
- Sleevenotes to Lloydova hlava. Prague: Mata, 1999.
- "Ustavni soud naridil znovu projednat Muchovo dedictvi." Mlada fronta Dnes, 9 November 2005.
- "Valecny denik Jiriho Muchy." Reflex 23 (2004).
- Wanatowiczova, Krystyna (30 May 2005), "Stara dama strazi pevnost", Tyden (online ed.).
- Zejda, Radovan (1994), "Jeden ze zapovězených", Věčná zahrada (afterword), Třebíč, Czech Republic: Arca JiMfa.
