= Ghorawal =

Ghorawal Ghorawal, Sonbhadra
- Town
- Location in Uttar Pradesh, India
- Coordinates: 24.77°N 82.78°E
- Country: India
- State: Uttar Pradesh
- District: Sonbhadra
- Elevation: 303 m (994 ft)

Population (2001)
  - Total: 6,478

Languages
  - Official: Hindi
- Time zone: UTC+5:30 (IST)

Ghorawal is a town and a nagar panchayat in Sonbhadra district in the Indian state of Uttar Pradesh.

== Geography ==
Ghorawal is located at 24.77°N 82.78°E. It has an average elevation of 303 metres (994 feet).

== Demographics ==
As per India Bureau Census Ghorawal has an estimated population of 9,800 as of 2023. Males constitute 54% of the population and females 46%. Ghorawal has an average literacy rate of 59%, lower than the national average of 59.5%: male literacy is 69%, and female literacy is 47%. Moreover, 18% of the population in Ghorawal is under 6 years of age.

== See also ==
- Bhaiswar
