= Mucha Museum (Kounice Palace) =

Art museum in Prague, Czech Republic

- Muchovo muzeum
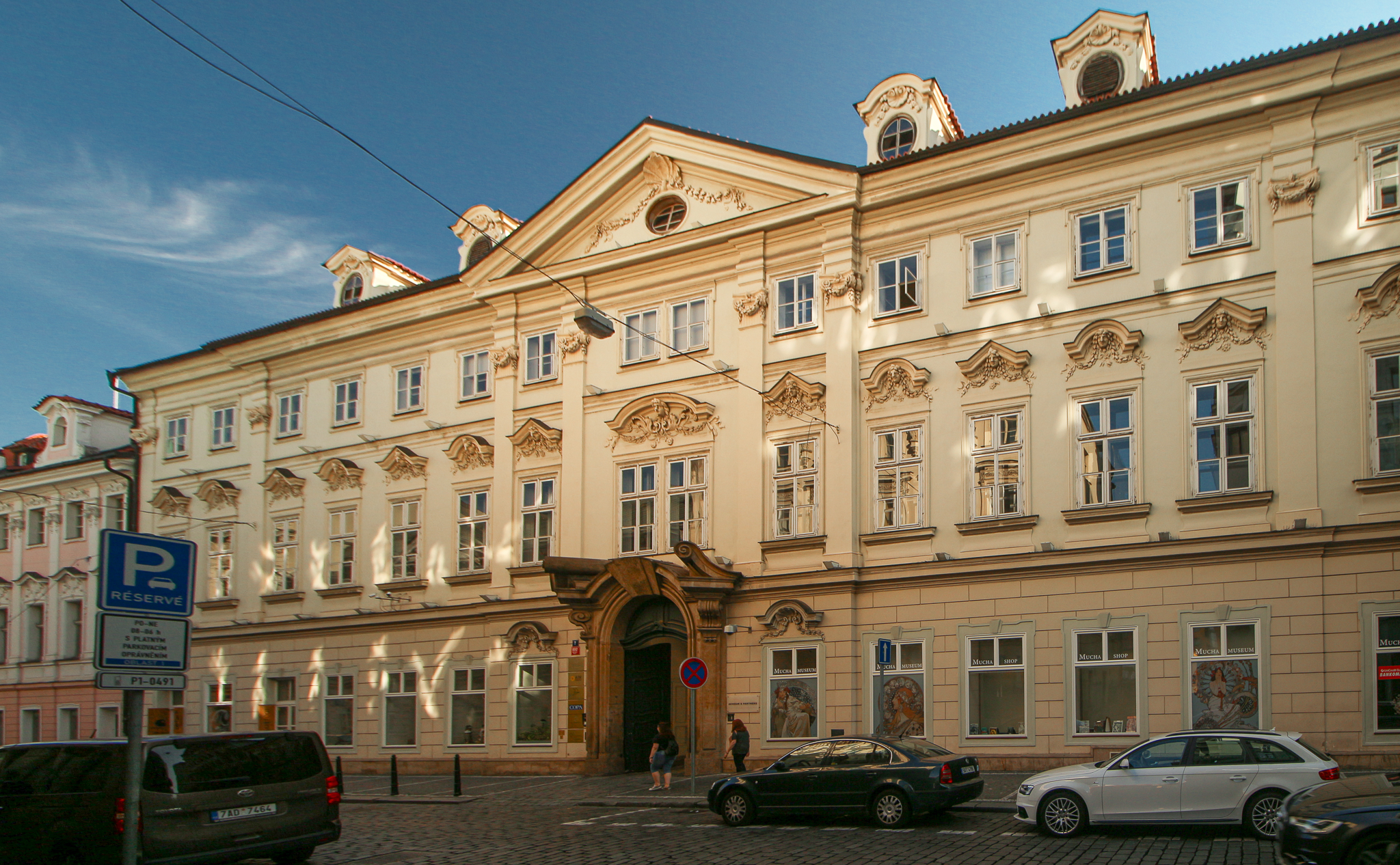
- Kounice Palace
- Established: 13 February 1998
- Location: Kounice Palace, Prague, Czech Republic
- Coordinates: 50°5′3.7″N 14°25′39.3″E
- Type: Art museum
- Director: Sebastian Pawlowski
- Website: www.mucha.cz

The Mucha Museum is a museum in Prague, Czech Republic, housing a collection of works by Alphonse Mucha since 1998. It currently houses the largest part of the Ivan Lendl collection of Mucha artworks.

== History ==
According to Geraldine Mucha, the original idea for the Mucha Museum came after the Velvet Revolution. Swiss entrepreneur Sebastian Pawlowski had bought and renovated Kounice Palace, under condition from the Prague government it be used for a cultural purpose. He approached Geraldine Mucha with the idea for a gallery of Mucha works. The museum was opened in 1998 as a joint venture between Pawlowski and the Mucha Foundation, containing works from the Mucha Trust Collection.

=== Split with the Mucha Foundation ===
The Mucha Foundation eventually sought to find a new location for the gallery, as the size of the old premises caused crowding issues. Sebastian Pawlowski, director of the Mucha Museum stated that he would not be moving location, and the Savarin Palace location was a separate project. By May 2024, the Mucha Foundation had fully cut ties with Pawlowski, and stated any exhibitions at the Mucha Museum were unauthorized. The Mucha Foundation claimed that they terminated their contract with Pawlowski, who they state owed several million koruna and had kept the paintings in conditions which could have damaged them.

The termination of the contract triggered several intellectual property disputes, as the Mucha Foundation claims it was what allowed the museum to use its name. Pawlowski stated "it is probably for the new place in Palace Savarin to wonder if it has the right to call itself the same as the original", while Mucha Foundation representative Simona Kordova claims that Pawlowski is breaking the law.

== Collection ==
The gallery used to contain works from Mucha's later period, and held objects from Mucha's studio. However, after the Mucha Foundation pulled its works from the Museum, they had to be completely replaced by works from tennis player Ivan Lendl's private collection.
