= Ada Vidovič Muha =

Slovene linguist

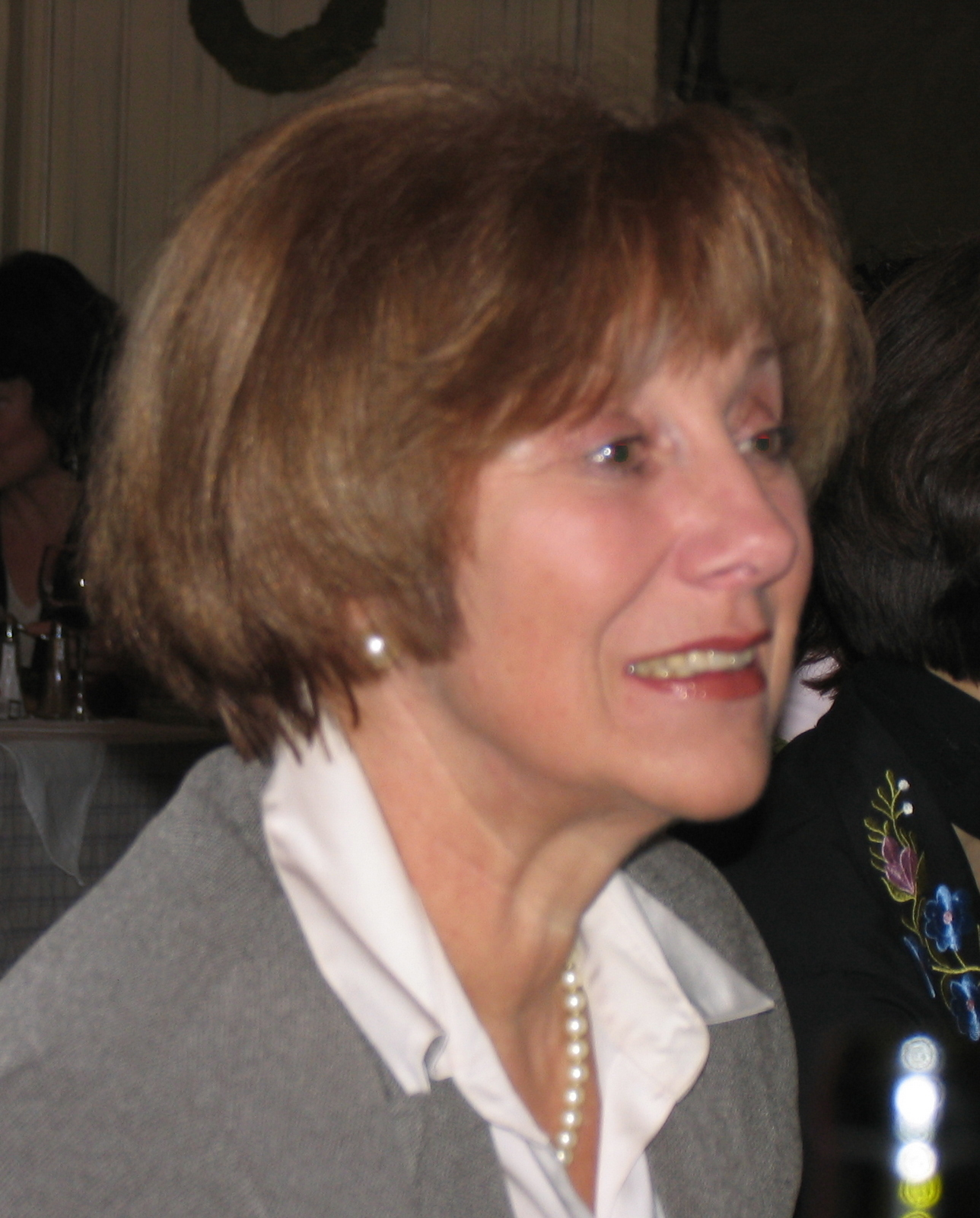
- Born: March 8, 1940 (age 86); Pivka, Yugoslavia

Academic background
- Education: University of Ljubljana

Academic work
- Discipline: Linguist
- Sub-discipline: Slovene

Ada Vidovič Muha (born March 8, 1940) is a Slovene linguist. She is an emeritus professor and has published several books on Slovene linguistics.

== Life ==
Muha was born in Pivka in 1940. In 1963 she received a bachelor's degree from the Faculty of Arts in Ljubljana after studying Slovene and Serbo-Croatian literature. After graduation, she studied at Charles University in Prague. She received her master's degree from the Faculty of Arts in Ljubljana in 1979 with a thesis on the syntactic role of adjectives, and she became an assistant professor. In 1984 she received a doctorate in linguistics.

She taught at the Fran Ramovš Institute and then later at the Faculty of Arts in Ljubljana.

In 2000, she published the reference book Slovensko leksikalno pomenoslovje: govorica slovarja on the semantics of Slovenian.
