= Subedar Prasad =

Indian politician

Member of Parliament, Lok Sabha
- In office 1989-1991
- Preceded by: Ram Pyare Panika
- Succeeded by: Ram Nihor Rai
- Constituency: Robertsganj (Uttar Pradesh)

Personal details
- Born: 1 April 1935 Rorawa, Sonbhadra District, United Provinces, British India
- Citizenship: India
- Party: Bharatiya Janata Party
- Spouse: Gangawati Devi

Subedar Prasad was an Indian politician belonging to the Bharatiya Janata Party. He was elected to the Lok Sabha the lower house of Indian Parliament from Robertsganj in Uttar Pradesh in 1989.
