= Ram Pyare Panika =

Indian politician

Member of Parliament Lok Sabha
- In office 1980-1989
- Preceded by: Shiv Sampati Ram
- Succeeded by: Subedar Prasad
- Constituency: Robertsganj (Uttar Pradesh)

Personal details
- Born: 2 July 1935 Sukaranndhi Village, Mirzapur District, United Provinces, British India (now in Uttar Pradesh), India
- Died: October 24, 1999 (aged 64)
- Citizenship: India
- Party: Indian National Congress
- Spouse: Basanti Devi

Ram Pyare Panika is an Indian politician. He was elected to the Lok Sabha the lower house of Indian Parliament from Robertsganj in Uttar Pradesh as a member of the Indian National Congress .
