= Yakir Shina =

Israeli footballer (born 1985)

Yakir Shina יקיר שינה
Personal information
- Full name: Yakir Shina
- Date of birth: September 25, 1985 (age 41)
- Place of birth: Rishon LeZion, Israel
- Height: 1.80 m (5 ft 11 in)
- Position: Center-back

Team information
- Current team: Hapoel Marmorek

Youth career
- Maccabi Tel Aviv

Senior career*
Years	Team	Apps	(Gls)
2004–2013	Maccabi Tel Aviv	15	(0)
2006–2007	→ Hapoel Bnei Lod (loan)	29	(1)
2007–2008	→ Hapoel Acre (loan)	31	(2)
2008–2010	→ Maccabi Ahi Nazareth (loan)	30	(1)
2010–2011	→ Hapoel Ramat Gan (loan)	30	(1)
2011–2013	→ Hapoel Bnei Lod (loan)	54	(7)
2013–2014	Beitar Tel Aviv Ramla	31	(1)
2014–2015	Hapoel Ra'anana	11	(0)
2015–2016	Hapoel Bnei Lod	21	(1)
2016–2017	Maccabi Netanya	23	(1)
2017–2018	Hapoel Rishon LeZion	16	(0)
2018–2019	Hapoel Marmorek	13	(0)

International career
2011–	Israel (beach)	2	(0)
- * Club domestic league appearances and goals as of 5 November 2019

Yakir Shina (Hebrew: יקיר שינה; born 25 September 1985) is an Israeli footballer who plays for Hapoel Marmorek. He had been loaned to Hapoel Ramat Gan, Hapoel Acre, Maccabi Ahi Nazareth and played for Beitar Tel Aviv Ramla, Hapoel Bnei Lod and Hapoel Ra'anana, and is a defender.

Yakir began his career with Maccabi Tel Aviv. He moved to Maccabi Ahi Nazareth in 2008. In the 2008–2009 season Maccabi Ahi Nazareth played in Liga Leumit and promoted to Ligat Ha'al and the fans of the team insisted that they wanted him to stay in the team at least for one more season. In the first match in the 2009/2010 season he scored a goal and showed that he is very talented player. After the match, scouts from Alemannia Aachen were interested by his fast and "fighting" playing style. Unfortunately in the second game against Bnei Yehuda Tel Aviv F.C. he was injured in the 40th minute and missed the rest of the season.

== Honours ==
- Liga Leumit
  - Winner (1): 2016-17
