= Ján Mucha (ice hockey) =

Slovak ice hockey player

- Born: January 1, 1984 (age 42) Malacky, Czechoslovakia
- Height: 5 ft 11 in (180 cm)
- Weight: 187 lb (85 kg; 13 st 5 lb)
- Position: Defence
- Shoots: Left
- Czech Extraliga team: HC Karlovy Vary
- Playing career: 2002–present

Ján Mucha (born January 11, 1984) is a Slovak professional ice hockey defenceman. He played with HC Karlovy Vary in the Czech Extraliga during the 2010–11 Czech Extraliga season.
