= Bhupesh Chaubey =

Indian politician

MLA, 17th Legislative Assembly
- Incumbent
- Assumed office March 2017
- Constituency: Robertsganj, Sonbhadra district

Personal details
- Party: Bharatiya Janata Party
- Occupation: MLA
- Profession: Politician

Bhupesh Chaubey is an Indian politician and a member of 17th Legislative Assembly of Robertsganj, Uttar Pradesh of India. He represents the Robertsganj constituency of Uttar Pradesh. He is a member of the Bharatiya Janata Party.

== Political career ==
Bhupesh Chaubey has been a member of the 17th Legislative Assembly of Uttar Pradesh. Since 2017, he has represented the Robertsganj constituency and is a member of the BJP.

== Posts held ==
#	From	To	Position	Comments
01	2017	Incumbent	Member, 17th Legislative Assembly	

== See also ==
- Uttar Pradesh Legislative Assembly
