= Geraldine Mucha =

Scottish composer (1917–2012)

Geraldine Thomson Mucha (5 July 1917 – 12 October 2012) was a Scottish composer.

She was born in London and studied at the Royal Academy of Music. She married the Czech writer Jiří Mucha, son of the painter Alphonse Mucha, and in 1945 moved to Prague. She lived there for the greater part of the next sixty years.

== Early life and education ==
Geraldine Mucha was born in London on 5 July 1917. She was the only child of Marcus Thomson (sometimes spelled Thomsen) who came from Glasgow, and of Maisie Evans, a New Zealander. Marcus Thomson studied at the Royal Academy of Music (R.A.M.) in London between 1902 and 1906 and became a successful baritone singer. In 1920 he was appointed as a singing professor at the R.A.M. where he remained on the staff until the 1950s. Maisie Evans studied music in Leipzig and during the First World War appeared in a leading role in the long running musical success Chu Chin Chow (His Majesty's Theatre, London, 1916) and later on in Nigel Playfair's famous production of The Beggar's Opera (Lyric Theatre, Hammersmith, 1920).

Mucha herself showed an interest in music from a very early age and her father, impressed by her improvisations at the piano, taught her to read and write music before she went to school. Between 1929 and 1934 Mucha attended Frognall School; a private establishment in North London much favoured by actors and musicians for their daughters' education. It was here that she became friends with Maeve Bax, daughter of the well known composer Arnold Bax (1885–1953). His interest was caught by Mucha's musical talent and he played through her early works and gave her advice. She also took lessons in harmony with her father's colleague, the composer Benjamin Dale (1885–1943). She was a keen concert–goer and often attended the opera with her mother and developed a passion for the ballet.

In the autumn term of 1935 Mucha became a student at the Royal Academy of Music, where she was awarded several scholarships. Her first study was Piano and her second Composition. For this she once more received tuition from Dale and also William Alwyn (1905–1985), Alan Bush (1900–1995) and Harry Farjeon (1878–1948).

Whilst a student Mucha composed the ballet Nausicaa which was given in a performance for two pianos at a student concert. Constant Lambert (1905–1951), musical director for the Sadler's Wells Ballet, was impressed when he was shown the score but was apparently sceptical that a woman could have written it. In her final year as a student Mucha had a piano quartet, Halingdal, performed by the Philharmonic Quartet at the prestigious Wigmore Hall in London. This was subsequently published by Boosey and Hawkes.

Mucha graduated from the Academy in the summer of 1943.

== Marriage and emigration ==
In the spring of 1941, whilst attending a party in Leamington Spa, Geraldine met the young Czech writer Jiří Mucha. They were married in London in 1942. While her new husband was abroad, working as a war correspondent, Geraldine served as a telephone switchboard operator. She also made musical arrangements for the BBC. Shortly after the war in Europe was over, the couple settled in Prague, which was their main home for the rest of their lives. Here Geraldine Mucha became involved in the creation of the early Prague Spring music festivals. Their only child, John, was born in 1948. In 1950 Jiří was arrested by the Communists for his wartime collaboration with the Allies. He was jailed and not released until 1953. During this time Geraldine lived on a small holding in the Czech countryside and served as organist at the village church. After Jiří Mucha's release he was gradually able to resume his writing career and Geraldine had occasional work as a music editor for the publishers Melantrich. She became a member of the Czechoslovak Composers Union and her compositions were given public performances and recordings by professional orchestras.

Beginning in the early 1960s the Muchas were closely involved in the international resurgence of interest in the Art Nouveau designs of Jiří's father, Alphonse. In order to make it easier to arrange exhibitions beyond the Iron Curtain, Geraldine returned to live in Scotland so that when her husband was able to obtain permission for "marital visits" they could, in fact, tour the world supervising the growing number of exhibitions.

Jiří Mucha died in 1991, just after the communist government collapsed, and consequently Geraldine returned to Prague for the remainder of her life; although she continued to spend every summer at her house in Scotland, not far from Aberdeen. While in Prague she was able to return to the Mucha family home opposite Prague Castle and to renew friendships with other post-war English friends such as Patricia Josten, wife of the noted exile Josef Josten.

With her son John and the newly created Mucha Foundation, Geraldine continued to act as an enthusiastic ambassador for the artistic legacy of her father-in-law. Nevertheless, she continued writing music until the very end of her life. In her later years there was a revival of interest in her chamber music, especially amongst Prague's professional musicians, and new works were commissioned and performed. Her orchestral works were, however, almost entirely forgotten.

Geraldine Mucha died at her home in Prague on 12 October 2012. Only two weeks earlier she had attended a concert of her music given in the Prague Conservatory of Music to celebrate her 95th birthday.

She is buried together with her husband in Prague's Vyšehrad Cemetery.

== Music ==
Mucha was encouraged as a composer from an early age. Before beginning her formal studies at the Royal Academy of Music she had already been privately tutored by the composer Benjamin Dale and had had her teenage compositions overseen by Arnold Bax, one of the most well known British composers of his day. So she was already familiar with the late Romantic musical style of these two popular figures.

On entering the R.A.M. she was taught by two notable young composers, Alwyn and Bush. Their more astringent, post–romantic style undoubtedly coloured Mucha's own manner of writing. But with her deep love of Scottish folk music, which she often quoted in her works, she remained closer to the interests of older composers, such as Ralph Vaughan Williams (1872–1958) or Béla Bartók (1881–1945) whom she particularly admired. Igor Stravinsky was another "modern" whose music held a great fascination for her and she was endlessly interested in how composers constructed and scored their works.

Mucha's first encounter with Czech music had been shortly before the Second World War when she had heard the young prodigy Vítězslava Kaprálová (born 1915) conducting her own music in a concert in London (Kapralová was to become Jiří Mucha's first wife until her early death in 1940). She also heard pieces by Janáček and Martinů conducted in wartime performances by the Czech émigré Vilém Tauský (1910–2004). Having arrived in Prague, Mucha hoped to take lessons with Vítězslav Novák (1870–1949), a distinguished composer with a definite late-Romantic approach to music. This did not happen, but in her own music Mucha continued to seek to blend her personal romantic spirit with a more modern, mid-twentieth century sound. In this she shared a similarity with her Czech contemporaries Petr Eben (1929–2007) and Luboš Fišer (1935–1999).

=== Recordings ===
- 'Macbeth and Other Orchestral Works': Tempest Overture, Macbeth Suite, Songs of John Webster, Piano Concerto, Sixteen Variations on an Old Scottish Song
- 'Chamber music': String Quartets 1 and 2, Variations on an Old Scottish Song, Naše cesta, For Erika, Wind Quintet, Epitaph (In Memory of Jiří Mucha

== Works ==
Selected works include:

- Nausica, ballet, 1942
- Macbeth, ballet, 1965
- Fantasy, 1946
- Pictures from Sumava symphonic suite, 1952
- Piano Concerto, 1960
- Carmina Orcadiana, 1960?
- The Tempest overture for orchestra, 1964
- String quartets, 1941, 1962 (discarded), 1988
- Parting and Teasing, for piano 1942
- Sonatina for Viola, 1945
- Sonatas for violin and piano, 1947, 1961
- Piano pieces for children, 1953
- 16 Variations on a Scottish Folksong, for piano 1957
- Sea Scenes, for violin and piano 1958
- Nonet, 1959, 1982
- Sonnets from Shakespeare for speaker, flute, and harp, 1961
- Song of Songs for speaker, flute, and harp, 1963
- Serenade for wind quintet, 1964
- Intermezzo for English horn and strings, 1988
- Music for harp and piano, 1990
- Epitaph (in memory of Jiri Mucha), for string quintet and oboe, 1991
- Piano Trio, 1995
- Collection of Czech and Slovak songs for baritone and piano, 1943
- Folk Lullabies, 1952
- Two Choruses for women's voices, 1956–1958
- Incantation for baritone and orchestra on lyrics by Byron, 1960
- En Los Pinares de Jucar for soprano, oboe d'amore and strings, 1975
- 3 Jersey Folksongs, for soprano, baritone, and piano, 1975
- 3 Winter Songs for soprano, baritone, and piano, 1975
- John Webster Songs for soprano and orchestra (also a version for oboe d'amore, harpsichord, and for piano, 1975–1988
- 5 canciones de Antonio Machado for soprano and 7 solo instruments, 1980s
- Sonnets of Hawthornden for soprano, oboe, and string quintet, 1990
- Epitaph for oboe and string quintet, 1991
