= Pakaudi Lal Kol =

Member of Parliament

Pakauri Lal

Member of Parliament for Robertsganj
- In office 2009–2014
- Prime Minister: Manmohan Singh
- Preceded by: constituency created
- Succeeded by: Chhotelal
- In office 2019–2024
- Prime Minister: Narendra Modi
- Preceded by: Chhotelal

Personal details
- Born: 2 July 1952 (age 73) Patehara Kalan Urf, Mirzapur, Uttar Pradesh, India
- Party: Apna Dal (Sonelal) (2019-2024 )
- Other political affiliations: Samajwadi Party (till 27 March 2019) (SP)
- Spouse: Mrs. Panna Devi
- Children: 7 (2 sons, and 5 daughters)
- Occupation: Agriculturist and Politician

Pakaudi Lal Kol is an Indian politician and was member of the 15th and 17th Lok Sabha. He represented the Robertsganj parliamentary constituency of Uttar Pradesh.

== Career ==
He has joined Apna Dal (Sonelal) on 27 March 2019 & is contesting the 17th Lok Sabha election from Robertsganj seat as an Apna Dal (Sonelal) candidate with the support of Bharatiya Janata Party.

Pakauri Lal is Under Matriculate by education. He was an agriculturist before joining politics.

== Posts held ==
#	From	To	Position
01	2002	2003	Member, Uttar Pradesh Legislative Assembly
02	2009	2014	Elected to 15th Lok Sabha
03	2009	-	Member, Committee on Industry
04	2009	-	Member, Committee on Papers Laid on the Table
05	2010	-	Member, Consultative Committee on Ministry of Heavy Industries and Public Enterprises
06	2019	2024	Elected to 17th Lok Sabha

== See also ==
- List of members of the 15th Lok Sabha
- List of members of the 17th Lok Sabha
