= Asaf Ben-Muha =

Israeli footballer

Asaf Ben-Muha אסף בן-מוחא
Personal information
- Full name: Asaf Ben Muha
- Date of birth: August 4, 1985 (age 41)
- Place of birth: Hadera, Israel
- Position: Center back

Team information
- Current team: Maccabi Daliyat al-Karmel

Youth career
- Maccabi Hadera
- 2001–2004: Maccabi Netanya

Senior career*
Years	Team	Apps	(Gls)
2003–2007	Maccabi Netanya	32	(1)
2007	→ Hapoel Nazareth Illit (loan)	16	(0)
2007–2009	Hapoel Bnei Lod	51	(2)
2009–2010	Ironi Umm al-Fahm	26	(2)
2010–2011	Hapoel Bnei Lod	19	(0)
2011–2013	Hapoel Petah Tikva	51	(0)
2013	Maccabi Yavne	6	(0)
2013–2015	Maccabi Daliyat al-Karmel	49	(3)
2015	Beitar Kfar Saba	3	(0)
2015–2017	Maccabi Daliyat al-Karmel	34	(0)

International career
2003–2004	Israel U19	14	(0)
2003	Israel U21	1	(0)
2011–present	Israel (beach)	2	(0)
- * Club domestic league appearances and goals as of 1 June 2017

Asaf Ben-Muha (Hebrew: אסף בן-מוחא; born August 4, 1985) is an Israeli professional football (soccer) player.
