= TTI Telecom =

Telecommunications system management company

TTI Team Telecom International Ltd.
- Type: Public (Nasdaq: TTIL)
- Industry: Telecommunication; Computer software Operations Support Systems
- Founded: 1992, public since 1996
- Headquarters: Rosh Ha'ayin, Israel
- Products: Netrac-brand Operations Support Systems
- Revenue: ▲$46.1 million USD (2006)
- Number of employees: 361 (2006)
- Website: www.teoco.com

TTI Telecom, founded in 1992, is a developer and provider of next generation Operations Support Systems (OSS) to large communications service providers. TTI Telecom is based in Rosh Ha'ayin, Israel and operates subsidiaries in 7 other countries.

In August 2010 TTI Telecom was acquired by TEOCO Corporation.

== History ==
TTI Telecom was incorporated in 1990 and commenced its operations in 1992 as a subsidiary of Team Computers and Systems Ltd., after having operated as a division of Team Computers since 1988. TTI Telecom shares have been traded on the NASDAQ Global Market under the symbol Nasdaq: TTIL since an initial public offering of a minority stake of its shares in December 1996 when it was still a Team Computers subsidiary. In April 2005, TTI Telecom ceased to be a subsidiary of Team Computers.

In 2011, TTI challenged the Indian tax authorities in a case brought before the Indian Income Tax Appellate Tribunal in Mumbai. The court ruled in TTI's favor, ruling that software receipts were not royalties under the India-Israel tax treaty.

TTI Telecom has a registered patent in the United States and a patent application pending in Europe. The US patent addresses the functionality of a topology-based reasoning system for root-cause analysis of network faults, a component of the Netrac FaM product line.

== See also ==
- Economy of Israel
