= Meged oil field =

Oilfield in Israel

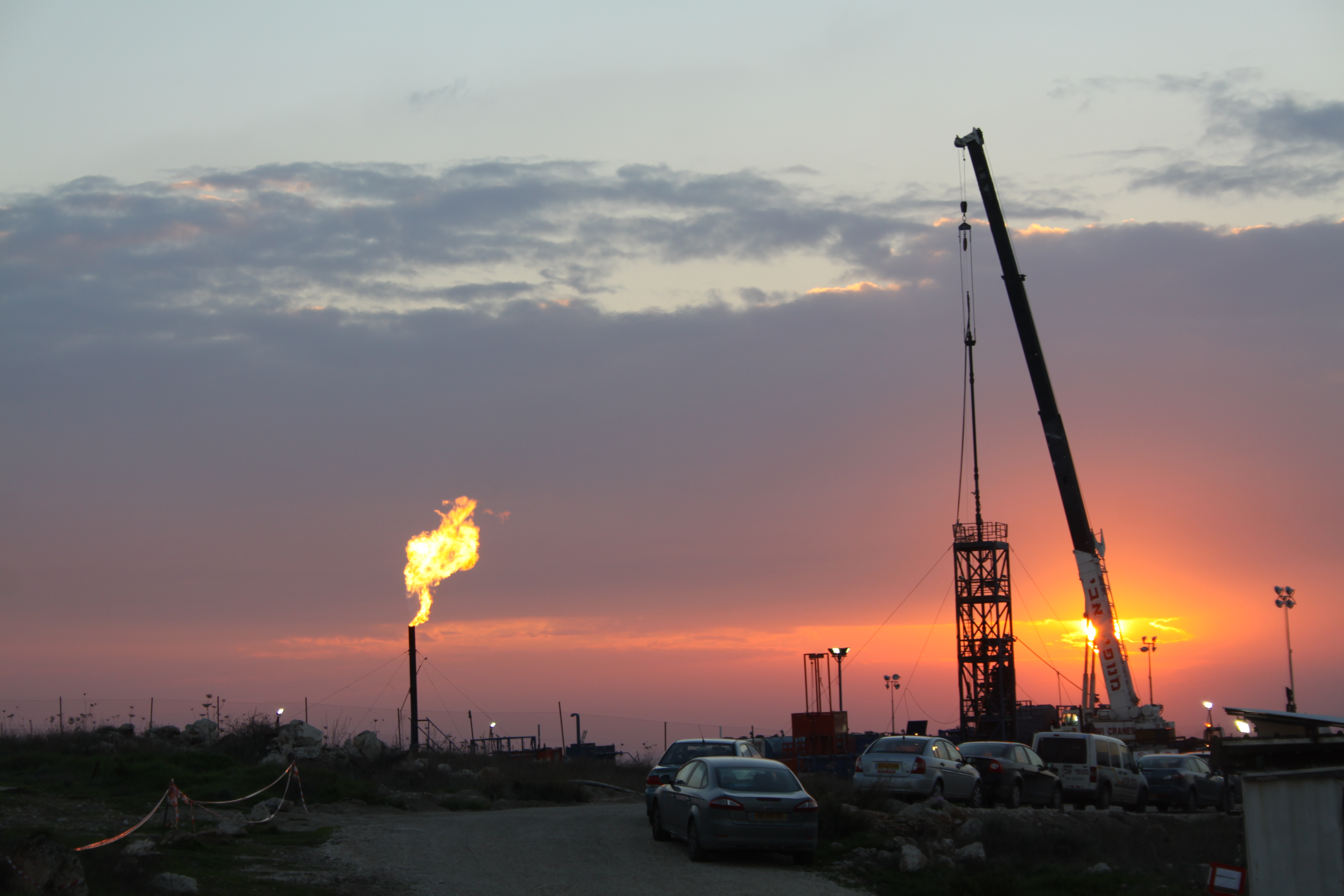
- Meged oil field at sunset, February 2011

- Location of the Meged oil field within Israel
- Country: Israel
- Region: Central District
- Location: Rosh HaAyin
- Offshore/onshore: Onshore
- Coordinates: 32°2′27.22″N 35°0′0.76″E
- Operator: Givot Olam

Field history
- Discovery: 2004
- Start of development: 2004
- Start of production: 2010

Production
- Estimated oil in place: 200 million tonnes (~ 242.5×10^{6} m^{3} or 1525 million bbl)

The Meged oil field is an oil field that was first discovered in the 1980s but declared to not be commercially viable at the time. In 2004, Givot Olam Oil declared to have made it commercially viable to drill. It is one of the largest on-shore oil fields in Israel. It began production in 2010 and produces oil as well as some natural gas. Its proven oil reserves are about 1,525 million barrels (242.5×10^{6} m^{3}).

== Overview ==
The Meged oil field is located near the towns of Kfar Saba and Rosh Ha'Ayin in Israel. It is situated close to the southern tip of the Palmyra rift system, a geological formation that extends across Syria to the northeast. Givot Olam, which owns and operates the Meged license, first announced its discovery of the Meged field in April 2004. The field spans 200 square kilometers.

- Meged 2. In 1998 the partnership announced that in the course of tests it was conducting at the Meged 2 bore, unidentified fluids accompanied by gas gushed out of the bore at a rate of 400 barrels a day. Meged 2 was abandoned in the years following.
- Meged 3. In 2000, after earlier having said it had found significant quantities of natural gas at the Meged 3 prospect, Givot announced a halt of drilling operations there on account of a technical failure. When the technical failure was resolved and drilling operations resumed, Givot announced that Meged 3 would be abandoned as the natural gas was not available in commercial quantities.
- Meged 4. After an exploratory drilling at the Meged 4 well in 1994 had failed to turn up oil in commercial quantities, in 2003 Givot Olam reported that tests it was conducting at Meged 4 indicated the presence of oil and gas 4,400 meters below the surface. 64 barrels of oil were recovered from the borehole before Givot announced in 2005 that it was discontinuing drilling operations after test results indicated that there was not enough oil to make development commercially viable.
- Meged 5. In 2009 the partnership announced that it had found indications of significant quantities of oil at its Meged 5 site. In mid-2011 Givot reported that Meged 5 was producing oil at a rate of 800 barrels a day. The Meged 5 well is located on land designated a training zone by the Israel Defense Forces.
- Meged 6. On June 19, 2013, the partnership announced that it had started drilling the Meged-6 oil well.

In early January 2012, Givot Olam reported that the state had rejected the company's proposal to drill at Meged wells 6, 7 and 8. Later in the month Givot reported that it had obtained approval to proceed with drilling operations at Meged wells 5, 6 and 14.

== Agreements ==
In 2010, Givot Olam sold 240 barrels of oil obtained from Meged 5 to Oil Refineries Ltd (BAZAN), an Israeli oil refining company.

During the first quarter of 2011 Givot sold NIS4.6 million worth of crude oil extracted from the Meged field to refineries.

An agreement signed between Givot Olam and Natural Gas for Israel Ltd. (GTL) in March 2012 stipulated that the former would supply natural gas to GTL from the Meged 5 well for a period of three years in exchange for $4.4 million, beginning in 2013.

== Religion ==
Givot Olam founder Tovia Luskin was drawn to the Meged site after interpreting a geological survey of the area in 1988 as confirming a biblical passage in the Book of Deuteronomy (33:15) and its associated commentary by Rashi. According to Luskin, he visited the Lubavitcher Rebbe in New York in 1990 and received a blessing from him.

In order to accommodate Jewish religious proscriptions against performing labor on the Sabbath, in 2011 Givot Olam introduced Shabbat clocks into its production system to obviate the use of manual faucets.

== Land rights ==
With the location of Meged Oil field close to the border between Israel and the West Bank, it is subject to a dispute over ownership rights.

Palestinians claim that Givot Olam decided that the field is commercially viable only after the creation of the Israeli West Bank barrier to the west of the field, which they claim is located within the borders of the Ramallah and al-Bireh Governorate.

According to a source in the Palestinian Authority, 80% of the Meged oil field is on land owned by Palestinians. Efraim Sneh has stated that although the oil drilling site is in Israel the oil reservoir may extend to the West Bank near the West Bank village of Rantis. Sneh suggested that cooperation between the Israeli and Palestinian sides could lead to the construction of a joint oil pipeline.

== Fracking ==
According to reports published by Givot Olam, the methods used in determining the potential for oil extraction at some of the Meged wells involve fracking.

== See also ==
- Associated petroleum gas
- Economy of Israel
- Hydrocarbon exploration
