= Rosh HaAyin =

City in Israel

Rosh HaAyin ראש העין روش هاعين
- City

Hebrew transcription(s)
  - ISO 259: Roˀš ha ʕayn
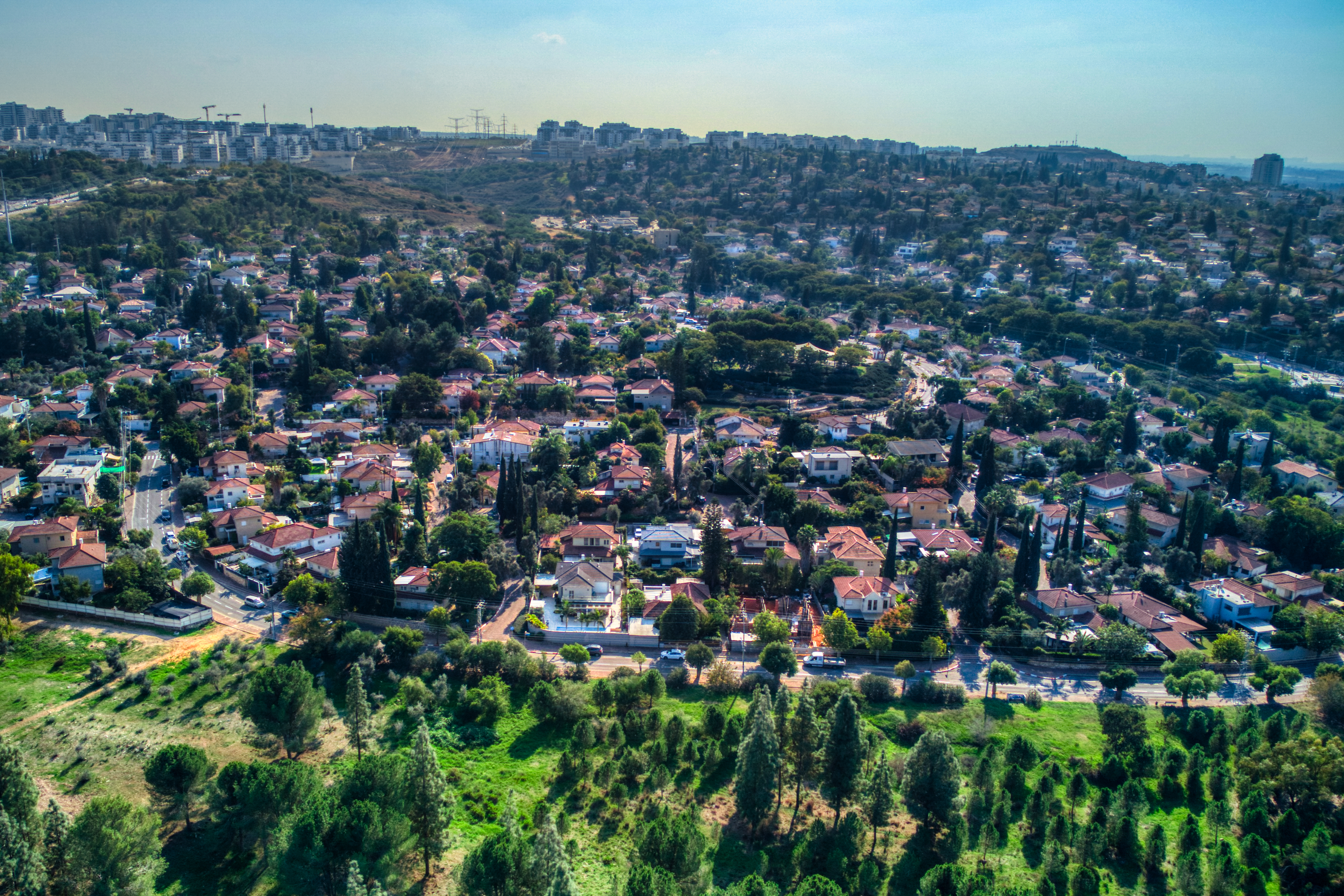

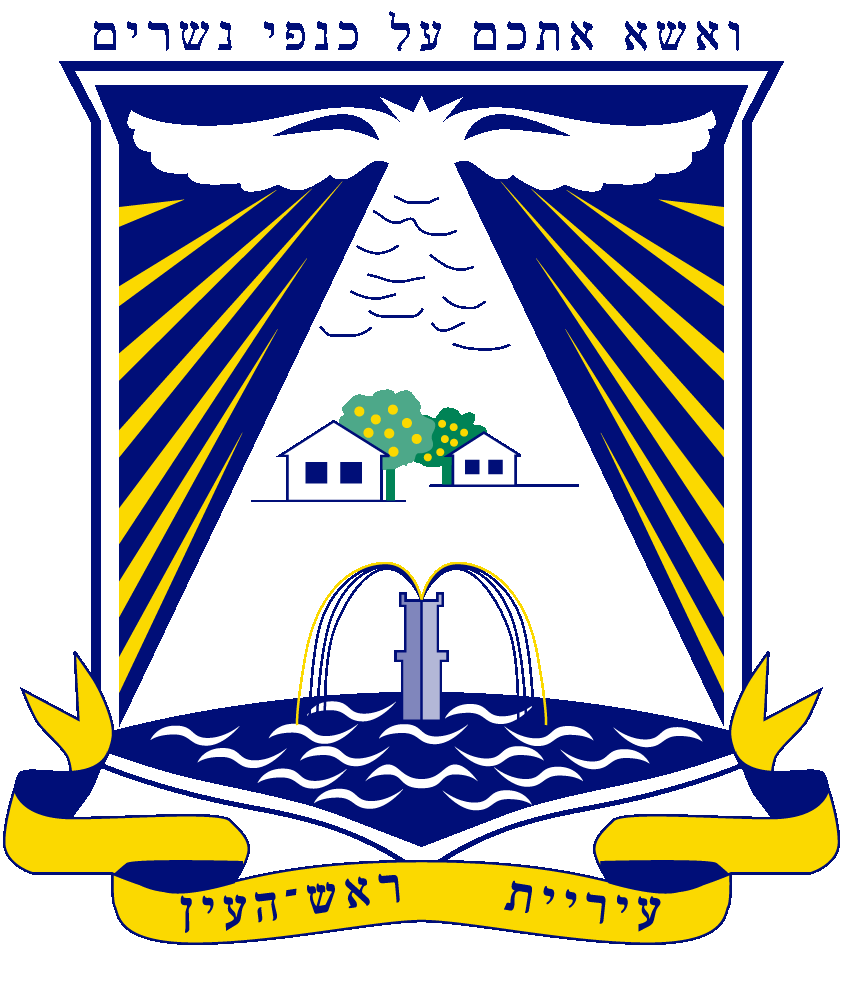
- And I carried you on eagles wings. Exodus19:4

- Location within Central Israel Location within Israel
- Coordinates: 32°05′44″N 34°57′24″E
- Country: Israel
- District: Central
- Subdistrict: Petah Tikva
- Natural Region: Petah Tikva
- Founded: 1949

Government
  - Type: Municipality
  - Mayor: Raz Sagi

Area
  - Total: 24.4 km^{2} (9.4 sq mi)
- Elevation: 81 m (266 ft)

Population (2024)
  - Total: 79,023
  - Density: 3,240/km^{2} (8,390/sq mi)

Ethnicity
  - Jews and others: 99.9%
  - Arabs: 0.1%
- Time zone: UTC+2 (Israel Standard Time)
  - Summer (DST): UTC+3
- Name meaning: Fountainhead
- Website: rosh-haayin.muni.il

Rosh HaAyin (Hebrew: ראש העין, pronounced [ˈʁoʃ haˈʔajin]) is a city in the Central District of Israel. It is located in the eastern ravine of the Sharon Plain, opposite the Samaria Mountains. The city is named after its location at the source of the Yarkon River ("Rosh" meaning source/head, "Ayin" meaning spring).

Rosh HaAyin was declared a city in 1994 and covers an area of approximately 16,000 dunams. Its eastern neighborhoods border the Green Line, and the city forms the boundary between the Central District and the occupied West Bank. The city is one of the fastest-growing cities in Israel. In 2024 it had a population of 79,023.

== History ==
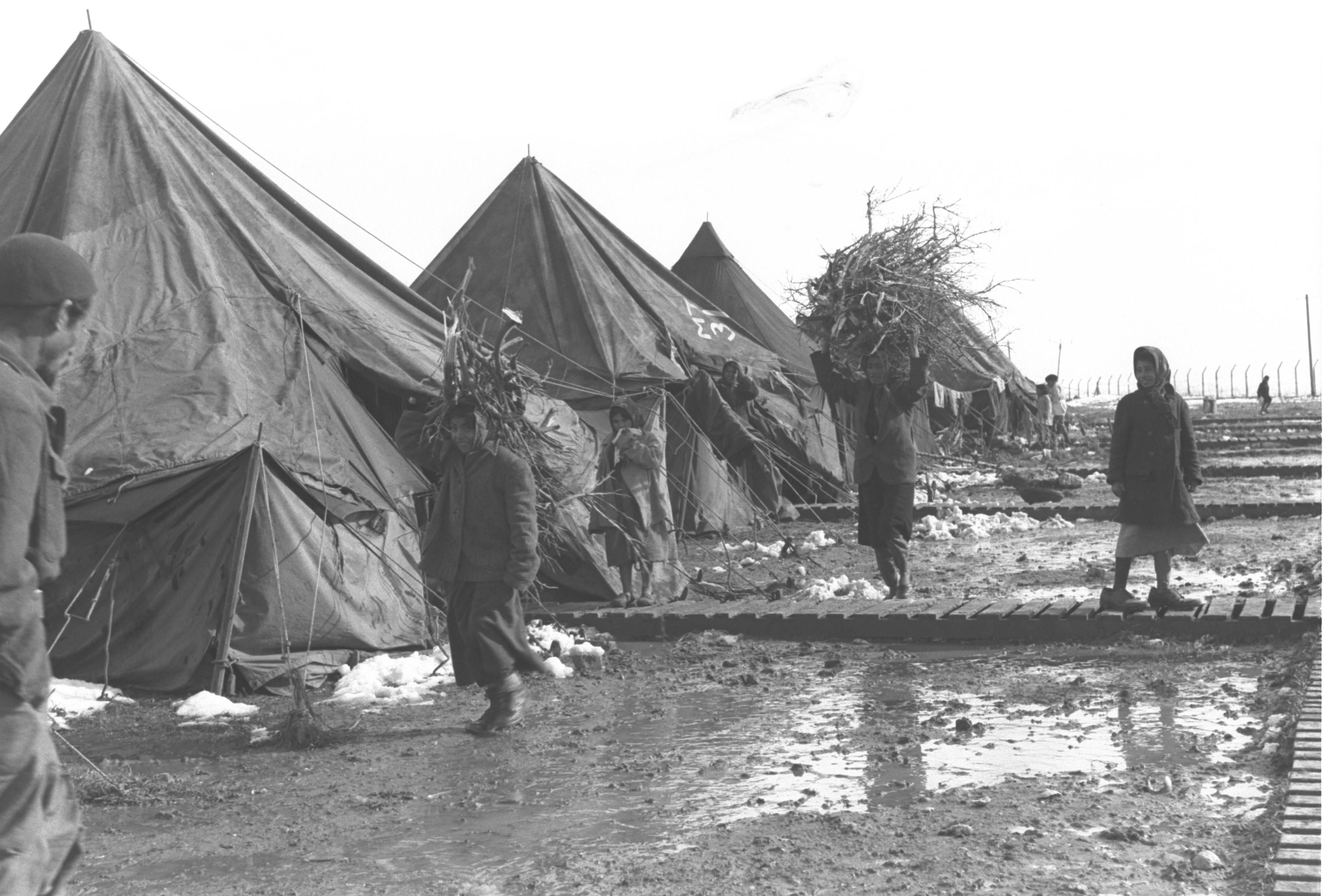
Yemenite-Jewish immigrants in the Ma'abarot (Transit Camps) Rosh Ha'ayin

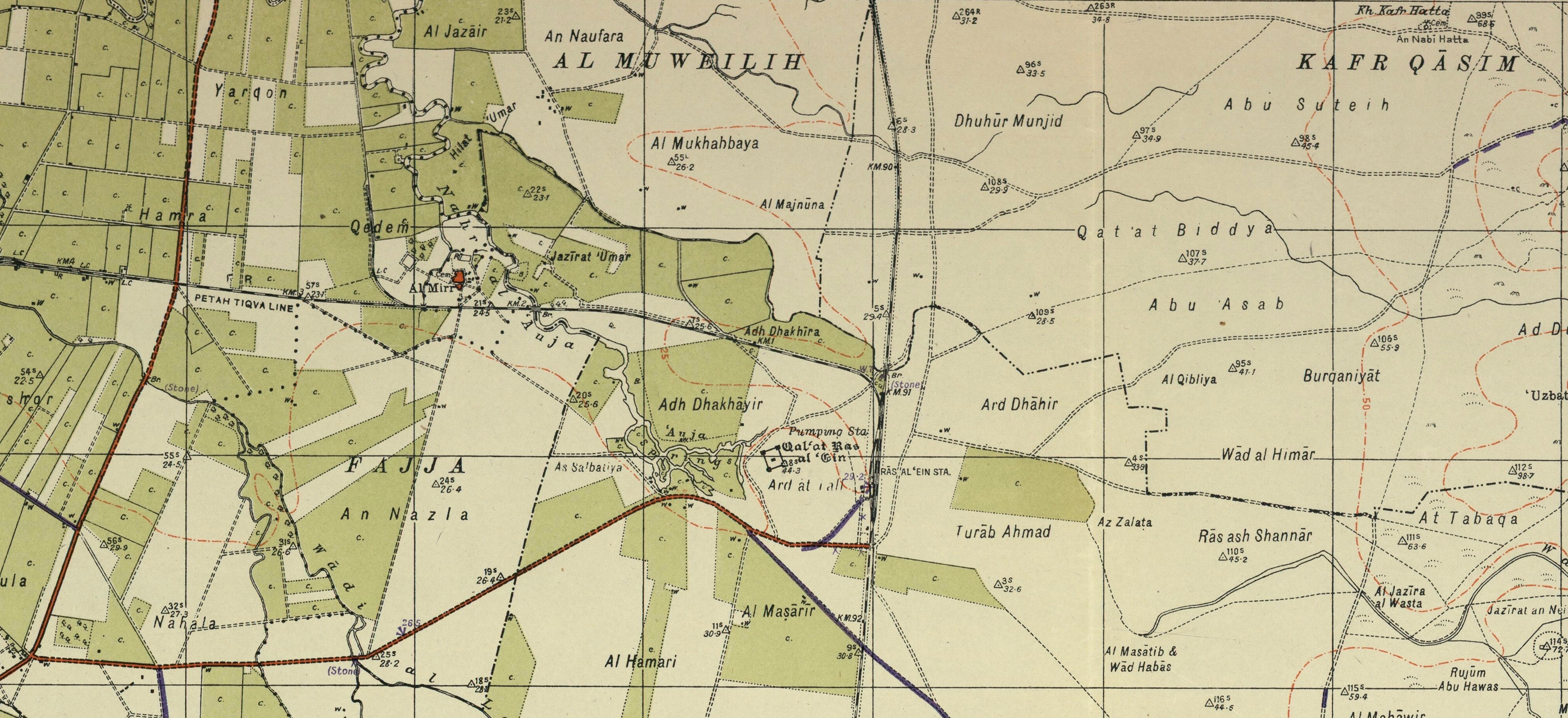
Ras al Ein 1941 1:20,000

Contemporary Rosh HaAyin lies between several sites of historic habitation, with records of occupation dating back hundreds, thousands, or, in one case, hundreds of thousands, of years.

Rosh HaAyin was founded in 1949 near the site of the Palestinian village of Majdal Yaba, which was captured by Israeli forces in July 1948.

The built-up part of Majdal Yaba lay to the south of contemporary Rosh HaAyin, on elevated land that today lies within the Migdal Afek national park. At the centre of the park is the ruin of a mid-19th Century fortified manor house. The ruins contain remnants of a crusader fort, Castle Mirabel, which was an important administrative location for the Crusaders until 1187, when it was taken by Salah ad-Din Yusuf ibn Ayyub, known as Saladin. It was known as Majdal Yaba by, at the latest, the early 13th Century, when it was recorded by geographer Yaqut al-Hamawi.

Northwest of Rosh HaAyin, in Yarkon Park, lies the ruins of Ottoman fortress of Ras Al-Ayn (Arabic: رأس العين), which was built following a decree issued in 1537.

Ras-al Ain means "head of the spring" in Arabic, a reference to the source of the Yarkon River, known as al-Auja in Arabic, which still flows nearby. The same phrase rendered in Turkish, pınar başı, was also used to refer to the location, and when rendered in Hebrew gives Rosh HaAyin, the name of the contemporary town a short distance away. A typical Arabic mispronunciation of the Turkish name, substituting "b" for "p", gave the fortress another of its local names: Binar Bashi. The crusaders knew the site as Surdi Fontes, or "silent springs."

There was an Arab village at Ras al-Ain during the British mandate. According to a study edited by the Palestinian historian Walid Khalidi, by 1948 it had been "deserted since the 1920s".

Today, the fortress is often referred to as the Antipatros fort, or in Hebrew as Tel Aphek (also transliterated as Tel Afek). However, the physical remains of the fort itself do not date from the Roman city of Antipatris, which was founded on the same site by Herod the Great in the First Century BC, nor from any of the ancient sites known as Tel Aphek.

In The Jewish War, historian Josephus mentions a tower at Aphek, which he implies is near to, but not collocated with, Antipatris. His account concerns the Roman general Cestius:

when he was informed that there was a great body of Jewish forces gotten together in a certain tower called Aphek, he sent a party before to fight them; but this party dispersed the Jews by affrighting them before it came to a battle: so they came, and finding their camp deserted, they burnt it, as well as the villages that lay about it.

To the east of contemporary Rosh HaAyin, between the neighbourhood of Neve Afek and the adjacent town of Kfar Qasim, is Qesem cave, an archaeological site containing evidence of human habitation dating back 400,000 years. It has provided some of the earliest evidence of the consistent use of fire by early humans.

=== Since 1949 ===
Many of the early residents were religious Yemenite Jews airlifted to Israel in 1949 and 1950 in Operation Magic Carpet. They added Biblical words from Exodus 19:4 to the city's logo: "I (God) carried You on eagles' wings." The place was one of the Israel Ma'abarot (transit camps) in the 1950s.

In the 1990s, new neighborhoods were built, although the town still has a large Yemeni-Jewish population.

== Archaeology ==
In 2015, archaeologists discovered a large ancient farmhouse. Among the other artifacts that were exposed in the farmhouse there were two silver coins from the fourth century BCE that bear the goddess Athena and the Owl of Athena. In addition, a monastery dating to the Byzantine period was discovered on one of the hills in the area and included a church, an oil press, residential quarters, and stables equipped with mangers and troughs, etc. In the church were colorful mosaics and also numerous Greek inscriptions.

=== Izbet Sartah mound ===
Izbet Sartah site where the abecedary was discovered

Izbet Sartah (Izbet Tzarta) mound is located to the north of Rosh HaAyin, in the fields between Rosh HaAyin and the town of Kfar Qasim. It was investigated by archaeologists in the 1970s. Izbet Sartah abecedary was discovered here. The site is located about 3 kilometers east of the ancient town of Antipatris, also known as Aphek. It is often identified by scholars with the biblical site of Eben-ezer.

In the excavations of this unfortified site, scholars discovered three levels of settlement, that were all short-lived. The earliest level was Stratum III, and it is believed to date to the twelfth century BCE.

Izbet Sartah ostracon was discovered in a grain silo during excavations directed by archaeologist Moshe Kochavi. This particular silo is associated with a large four-room house belonging to Stratum II. The sherd features five lines of text written in an early Proto-Canaanite (or early linear West Semitic) script, and the abecedary is found at the end. This ostracon may belong to the 12th or early 11th century BCE (the biblical Period of the Judges).

== Demographics ==
View source data.
Religion in Rosh HaAyin
1. Jews (98.6%)
2. Arab-Muslims (0.10%)
3. Arab-Christians (0.00%)
4. Druze (0.00%)
5. Others (1.30%)

Age groups population percentage(%)
Age	Percentage (%)
0–4	11.6
5–9	8.8
10–14	7.0
15–19	6.7
20–24	14.3
30–44	21.7
45–59	16.9
60–64	4.7
65+	8.2
Total	100

Historical population
Year	Pop.	±%
1972	12,200	—
1983	11,100	−9.0%
1995	29,000	+161.3%
2008	37,900	+30.7%
2022	74,572	+96.8%
2024	79,023	+6.0%

According to the Israel Central Bureau of Statistics (CBS), in 2018, the ethnic make-up of the city was 97.9% Jewish, with a predominant number of young people below the age of 19. The population growth rate was 9.7% at the end of 2019. In the 2021–2022 school year, 79.5% of 12th-grade students were eligible for a matriculation certificate. The average monthly salary of employees in 2021 was 13,292 NIS, compared to the national average of 11,330 NIS. As of the end of February 2025 (estimate), Rosh HaAyin had a population of 78,717 residents, including 77,909 Israeli citizens, ranking it 25th among local authorities in Israel. The city's annual population growth rate is approximately 1.8%.

== Economy ==
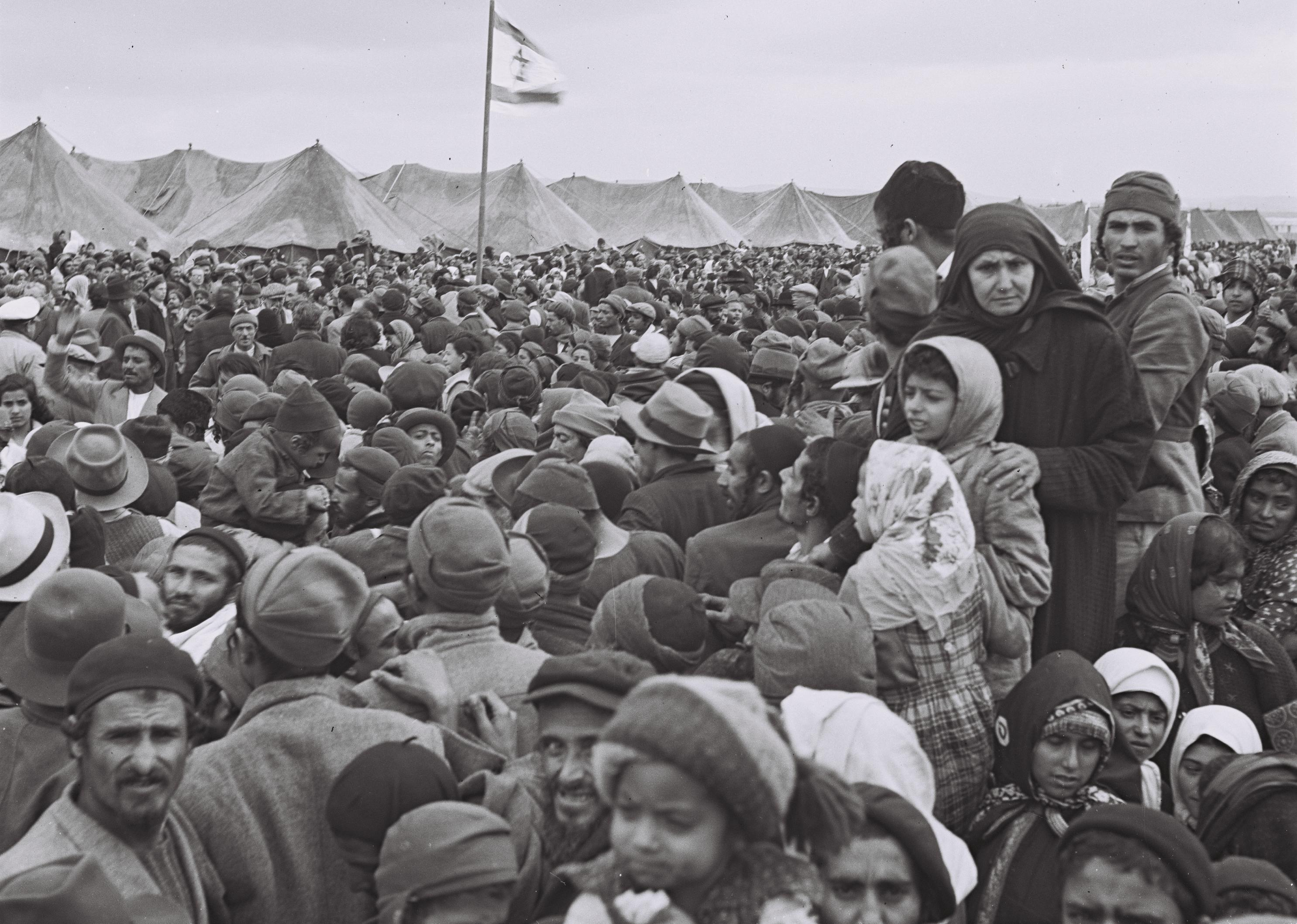
Ma'abara (Transit Camp) Rosh Ha-Ayin in 1950

According to the CBS, there were 10,972 salaried workers and 1,033 self-employed in 2000. The mean monthly wage for a salaried worker was NIS 6,595, an increase of 11.2% over the course of 2000. Salaried males had a mean monthly wage of NIS 8,408 (a real change of 7.8%) versus NIS 4,857 for females (a real change of 13.1%). The mean income for the self-employed was 6,853. 628 people received unemployment benefits, and 1,057 received an income supplement.

In 2004, the Givot Olam Oil company discovered oil at the Meged 5 oil field near Rosh HaAyin. It is one of the largest on-shore oil fields in Israel. It began production in 2010, and produces oil as well as some natural gas. Its proven oil reserves are about 1,525 million barrels (242.5×10^{6} m^{3}). TTI Telecom is located in Rosh HaAyin.

== Education ==
According to the CBS, there are 24 schools in Rosh Ha'ayin, with an enrollment of 8,288. Eighteen were elementary schools, with an enrollment of 5,043, and high schools, have an enrollment of 3,245. In 2001, 58.8% of Rosh Ha'ayin's 12th grade students were entitled to a matriculation certificate.

Total schools	Elementary schools	Pupils	Elementary pupils	Post-primary pupils	Number of classes	Average pupils per class
24	18	8,288	5,043	3,245	303	27.4

=== High schools ===
- Atid Religious' boys high school
- Yehuda Halevi-Begin high school
- Darchei Elisha religious' boys high school
- Zvulun religious' girls high school

== Sports ==
Ironi Rosh HaAyin is a professional beach soccer club. Initially founded in 2004 by Eran Aviv as a futsal team in the Israeli Futsal League, the club switched to beach soccer in 2007, joining the Israeli Beach Soccer League. They won their first national title in 2011, claiming the Israeli Beach Soccer League championship.

On the international stage, Ironi Rosh HaAyin has enjoyed notable success, including winning the Euro Winners Challenge in 2022 and the Capital Cup in 2008. In the 2022 Euro Winners Cup, the team finished 5th out of 60 clubs. The club's international results also include reaching the Round of 32 in the 2021 Euro Winners Cup and securing a dominant performance in the 2022 Euro Winners Challenge, where they won the title with six wins and just one loss.The club is managed by Tzahi Ilos, who guided them to their Euro Winners Challenge victory.

Ironi Rosh HaAyin's honours include winning the Euro Winners Challenge in 2022 and the Capital Cup in 2008 at the international level. Domestically, they secured the Israeli Beach Soccer League championship in 2011.

== Culture ==
=== Yemenite Jewish Heritage Museum ===
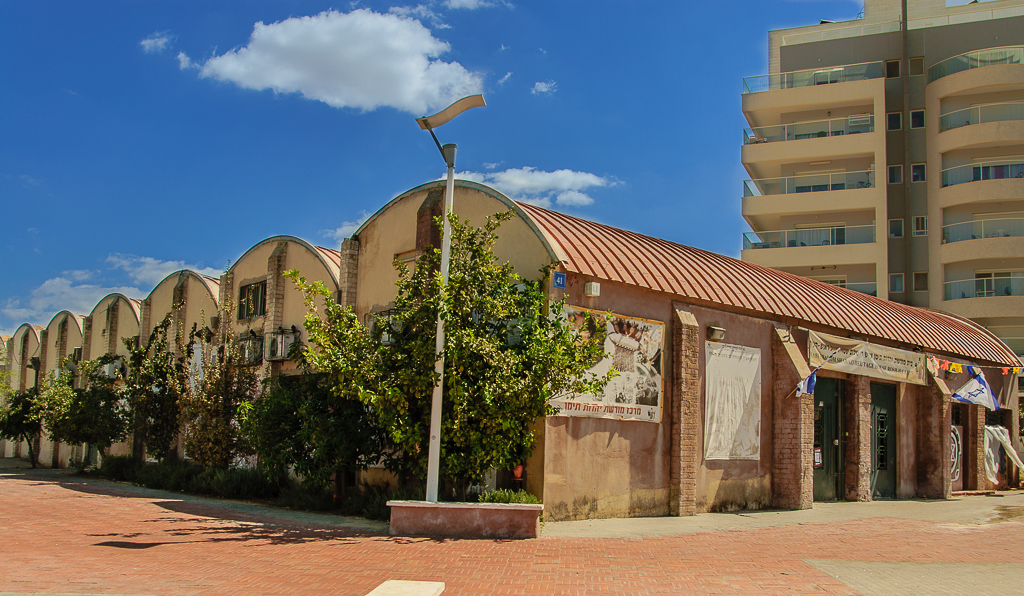
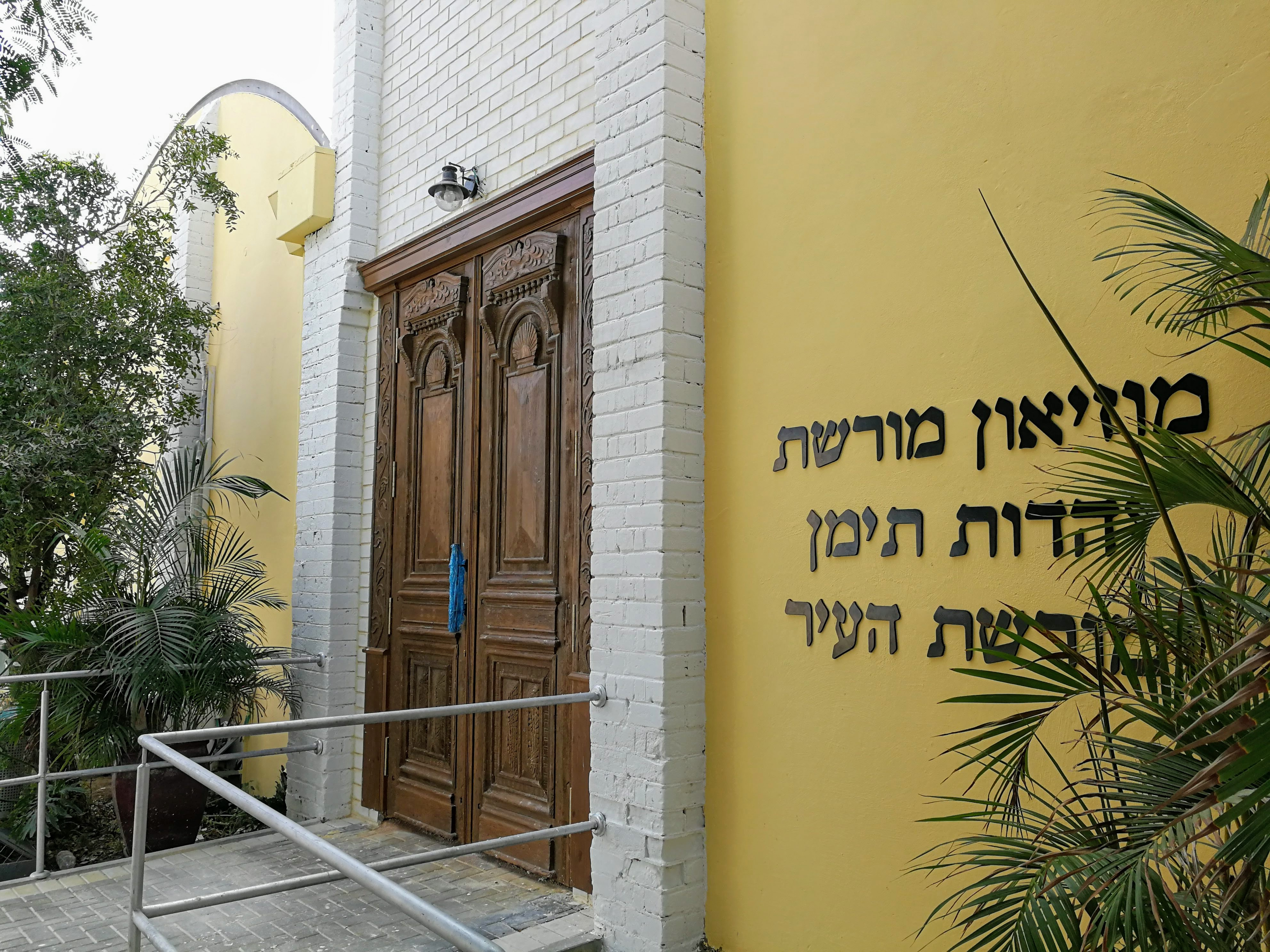
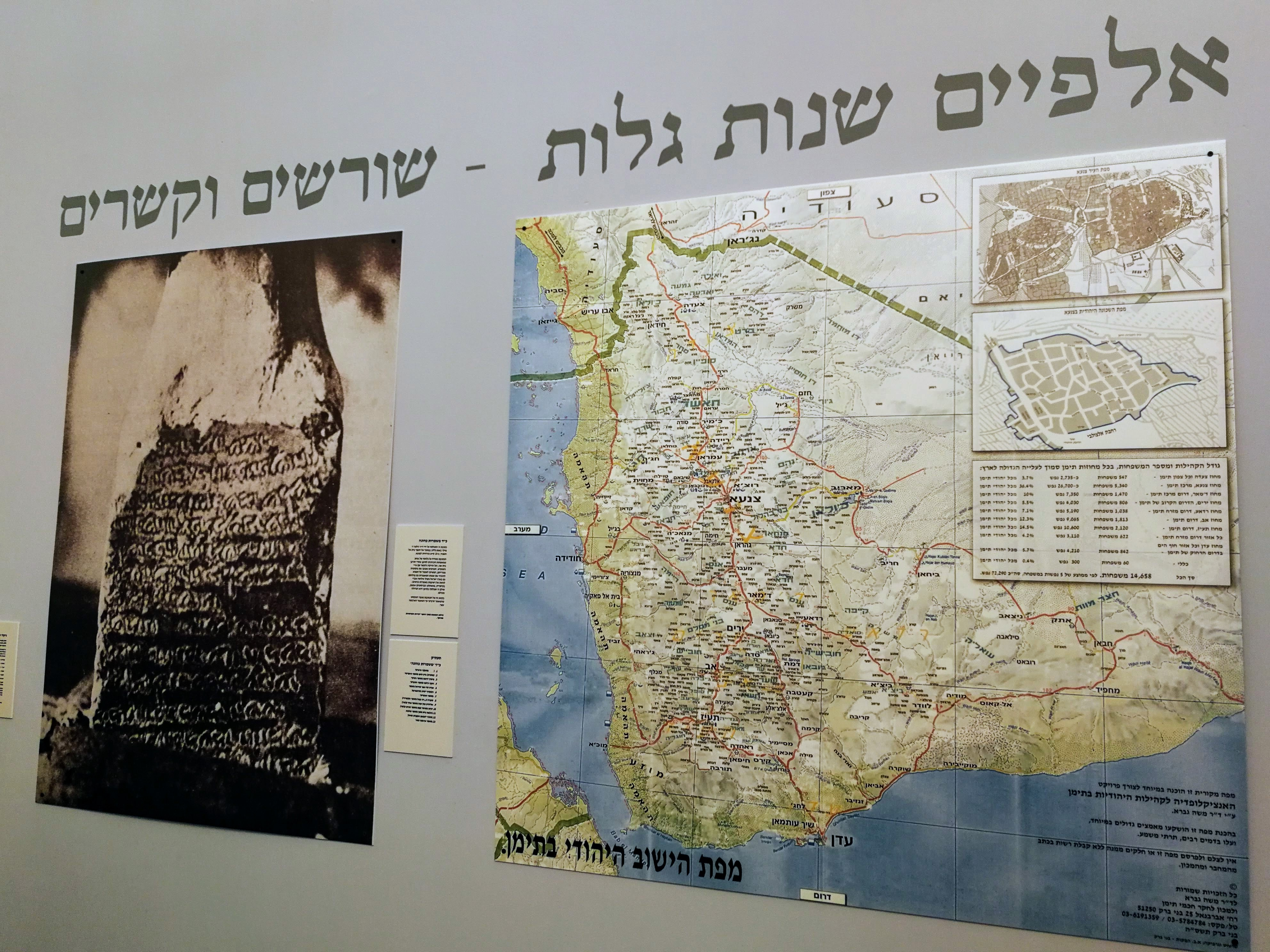
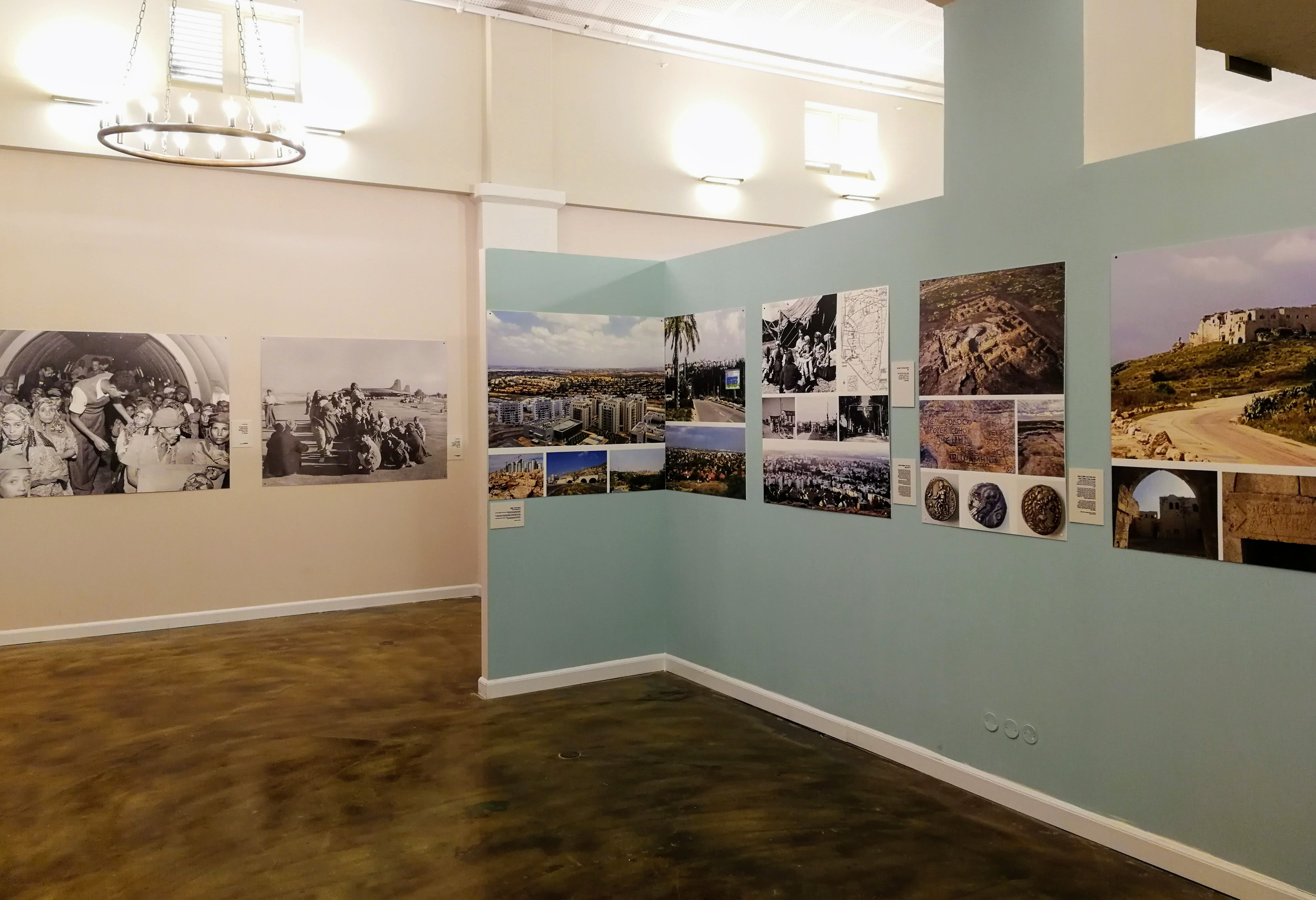
Images from the museum

The Yemenite Jewish Heritage Museum (מוזיאון מורשת יהדות תימן) is located in a historic Mandatory building. The museum displays photographs, documents, certificates, sacred books, ancient manuscripts, household items, traditional clothing, and numerous artifacts depicting Jewish life in Yemen and Israel. A film about Jewish life in Sanaa and the Henna ceremony is screened at the museum.

The museum also houses a study center containing extensive literature on Yemenite Jewish heritage, including history, literature, poetry, folklore, and other related subjects.

=== Rosh HaAyin Torah Core ===
The "Ruach Hadasha" (New Spirit) is a registered nonprofit organization comprising about thirty families, with dozens more families participating in its activities. Its primary goals include establishing a spiritual-ethical center for local residents.

=== City of Music ===
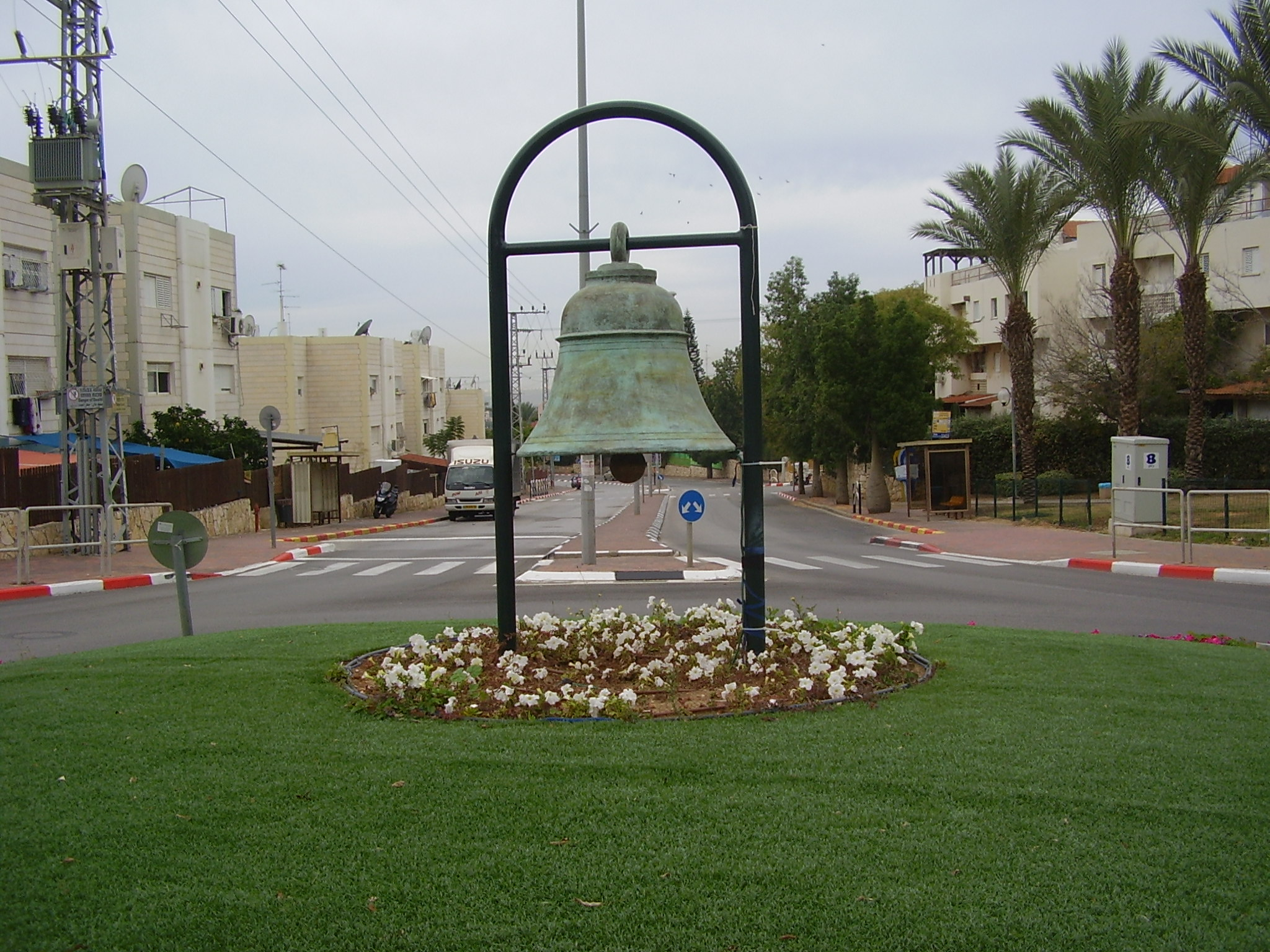
Rosh HaAyin – The City of Music – Bell

In recent years, the city council of Rosh HaAyin has been branding the city as the "City of Music." As part of this initiative, significant resources have been invested in musical education. One of the key projects is the "Sounds of Music Promenade," a scenic walkway built along the Raba Stream, featuring musical elements. Additionally, many of the city's roundabouts are decorated with statues of musical instruments and musicians.

In 2007, the Rosh HaAyin Music Center was established. It includes the municipal conservatory, the "Mizmorei Teiman" (Yemenite Melodies) choir, and various other music programs. Each year during the Sukkot holiday, the city hosts a music and food festival called "Timna" in the Lev HaIr Park (Heart of the City Park). The festival runs for several days, from the afternoon into the night, and features live performances, and food stalls.

=== Culture Hall ===
In 2023, the Kimerling Culture Hall was inaugurated, featuring a performance auditorium with over 600 seats.

== Heritage ==
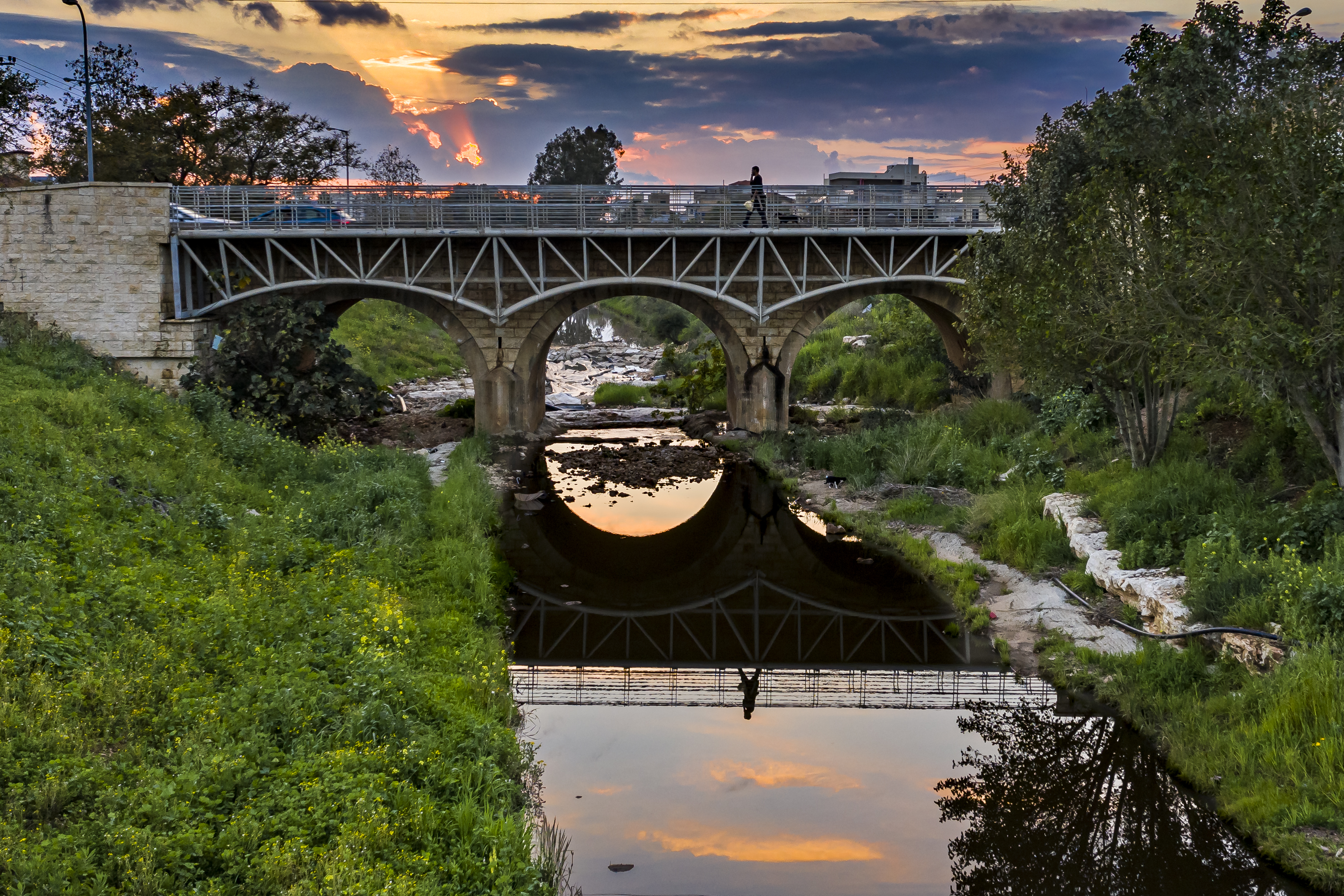
The British bridge in Rosh HaAyin. February 2019.

A cave, discovered during construction work in the residential neighborhood of Psagot Afek, contains remarkable speleothems, notably stalactites.

== Transportation ==
=== Public transportation ===
The city of Rosh HaAyin is served by Afikim and Egged bus companies. These, especially Afikim, serve internal transit, and they connect Rosh HaAyin to nearby towns such as Kafr Qasim and Petah Tikva, to Tel Aviv, as well as along Highway 5 to the settlement of Ariel in the West Bank.

The city is served by Rosh HaAyin North railway station, located northwest of the city. Herzliya–Ashkelon line runs through this station, which connects Rosh HaAyin to Herzliya in the Northern direction, and to Petah Tikva, Tel Aviv, and Ashkelon in the Southern direction.

=== Roads ===
The city is located at the interchange between Highway 6 (Trans-Israel Highway) and Highway 5 (Trans-Samaria Highway). Westbound Highway 5 provides connections to North-South thoroughfares that connect to localities in the Tel Aviv Metro Area. Eastbound Highway 5 crosses into the Occupied West Bank, passing through Kafr Qassem/Kafr 'Ein Checkpoint. This highway provides connections to several settlements such as Ariel. Southbound Highway 6 provides connections to Jerusalem, Ben Gurion Airport, and further south to Beersheba. Northbound Highway 6 provides connections to Haifa and Galilee.

Route 444 connects the city to its southern neighbors like El'ad and its northern neighbor Jaljulia. Route 483 connects Rosh HaAyin to Petah Tikva to the west.

The city is also collected to Kafr Qassem via a bridge over Highway 5.

=== Airport ===
The closest major airport to the city is Ben Gurion Airport near Lod. The airport is located about 25 km to the South, accessible via Highway 6.

== Structure ==
=== Neighborhoods ===
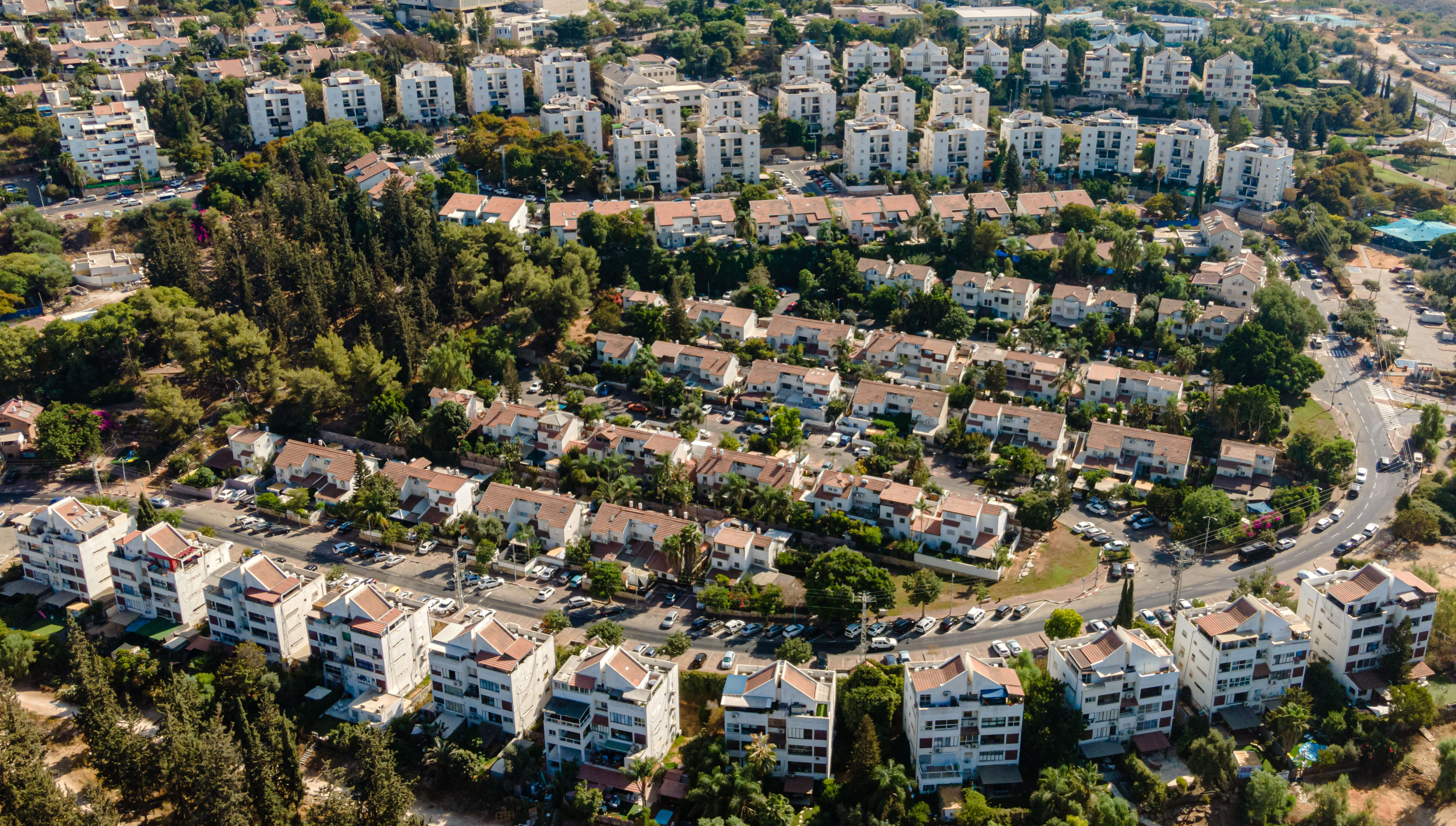
Image of one of the new neighborhoods, Neve Afek, which hosts both military personnel and civilians

- Old neighborhoods: Aviv, Harkafim, Tzahal (IDF), Rambam, Shabazi, and Mishkenot HaMusica.
- New neighborhoods: Givat Tal, Mitzpe Afek, Givat HaSelaim, Neve Afek (military and civilian), and Psagat Tal.
- Neighborhoods under construction: Psagot Afek.

=== Development plans ===
- Migdal Afek National Park – The transformation of Migdal Afek, located south of the city, into a national park and metropolitan recreation area. The complex is planned to include an agricultural farm, riding stables, bicycle paths, adventure sports, and an amphitheater.
- Lev Yisrael Employment Park – A planned center for employment, high-tech, and housing in the northwestern part of Rosh HaAyin, near Kafr Qasim. The park resulted from an unusual cooperation between the urban settlement (Rosh HaAyin) and the kibbutzim Givat HaShlosha and Horashim in the early 1990s. Under an agreement between Rosh HaAyin and the kibbutzim, land was annexed from the kibbutzim to Rosh HaAyin for the joint establishment of the park. The park is expected to cover about 1,000 dunams, with half dedicated to a residential neighborhood (about 1,000 housing units) and the other half for commercial and employment spaces (including what is planned to be Israel's largest mall on 100,000 m² of the space), movie theaters, convention halls, and cultural centers.
- Tzlilei HaMusica Promenade – A promenade along Nahal Raba, stretching from the Rosh HaAyin Forest in the city's east to Lev HaIr Park. The promenade's total length is about 26 km, with 7 km within the city.
- Psagot Afek Neighborhood Project – A joint venture between the municipality and the Ministry of Construction and Housing, which allocated about 1.5 billion NIS for neighborhood infrastructure. The project involves gradual construction of six residential areas on the city's eastern hills, paving an arterial road connecting Highway 444 to Highway 5, and building a new interchange on Highway 5. The neighborhood is expected to include about 14,000 housing units, increasing the city's population to about 100,000 residents.

== Geography and natural resources ==
=== Rosh HaAyin Forest ===
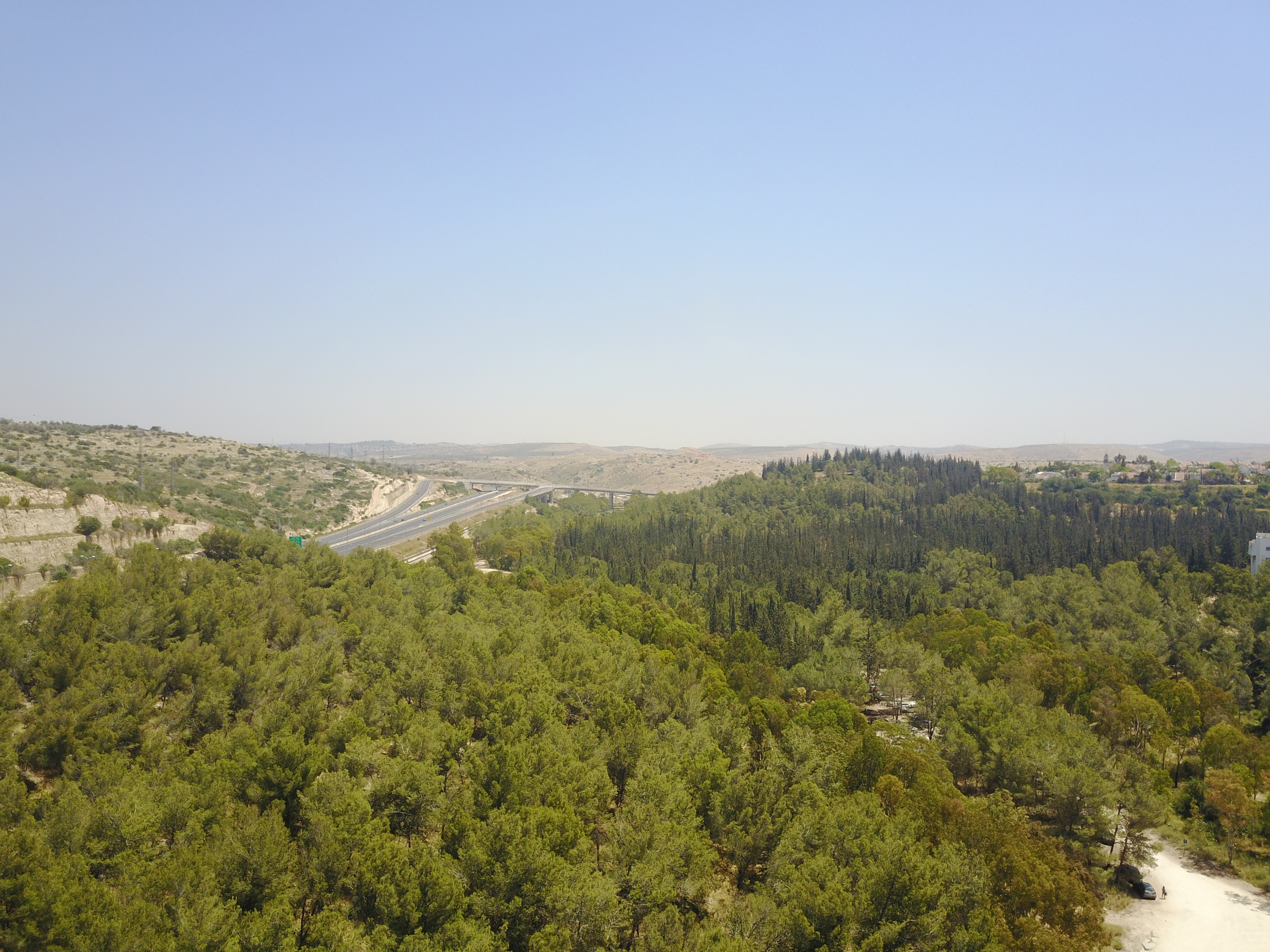
Rosh HaAyin Forest

The Rosh HaAyin Forest is a forest and green space located in the northeastern part of the city, along the tributary of Nahal Rabba. Covering an area of approximately 1,050 dunams (1.05 km^{2}; 0.41 sq mi), the forest was planted by the Jewish National Fund (KKL-JNF) between 1976 and 1980. It includes a mix of eucalyptus, pine, cypress, carob, almond, and jujube trees, along with orchard and native woodland species.

Several archaeological sites are located within the forest, including the biblical site of Eben-Ezer and Khirbet al-Daooir. From the "Ilan Lookout," visitors can view Nahal Rabba, Samaria, and Highway 5.

By 2001, the forest had been neglected and was being used as an illegal waste site. Restoration efforts began in 2006, with renewed cultivation and landscaping. Local schools, including the Afek School of Sustainability, adopted the forest, and KKL-JNF designated it a "community forest."

==== Access and trails ====
The forest includes one main entrance for vehicles via Kibbutz Galuyot Street, and additional pedestrian and cycling paths. Trails pass through natural and archaeological landmarks such as Khirbet a-Dwyer and the Izbet Tzarta mound. Pedestrian access is also available from Keshet Street in the Neve Afek neighborhood.

==== Flora ====
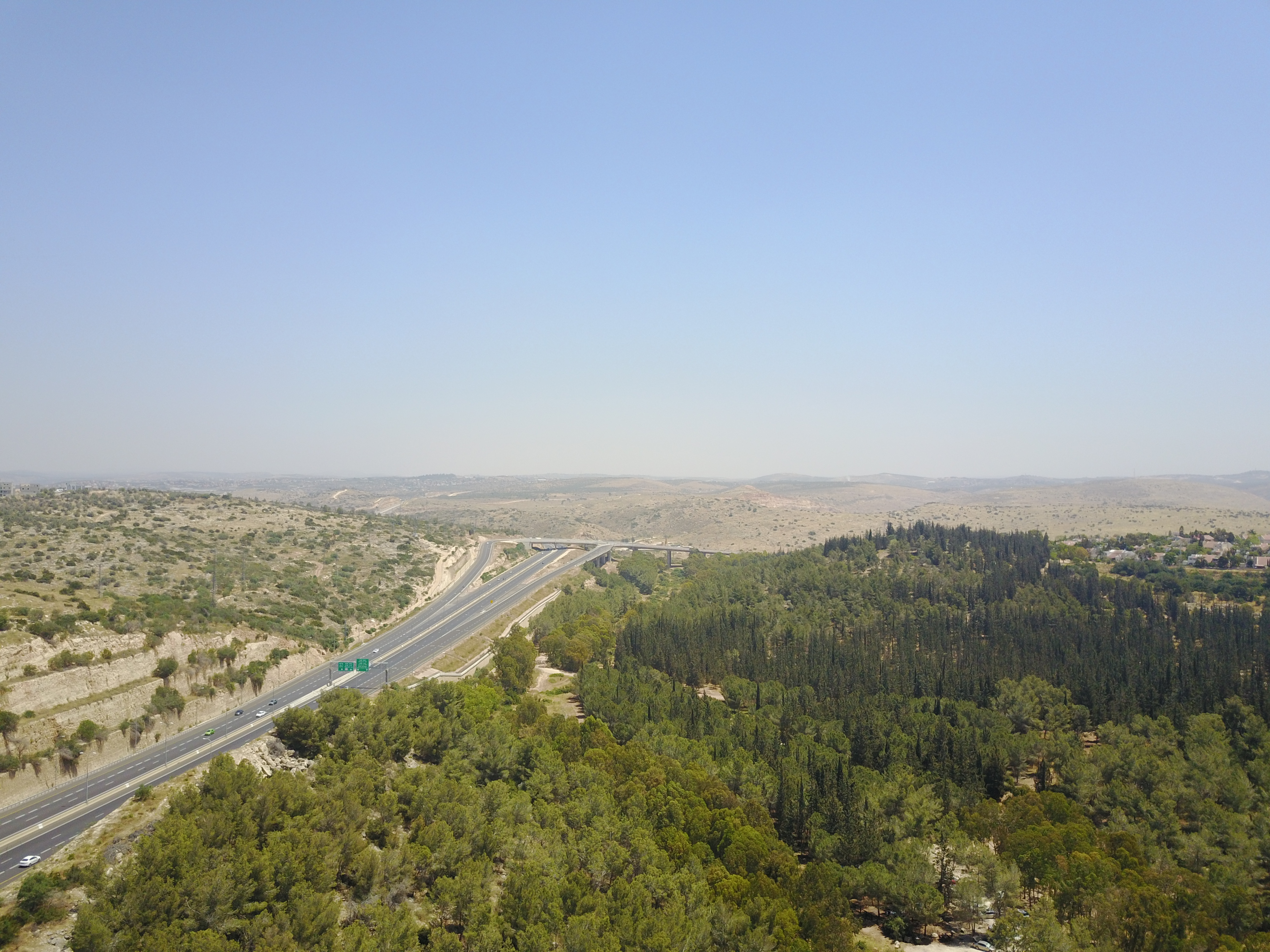
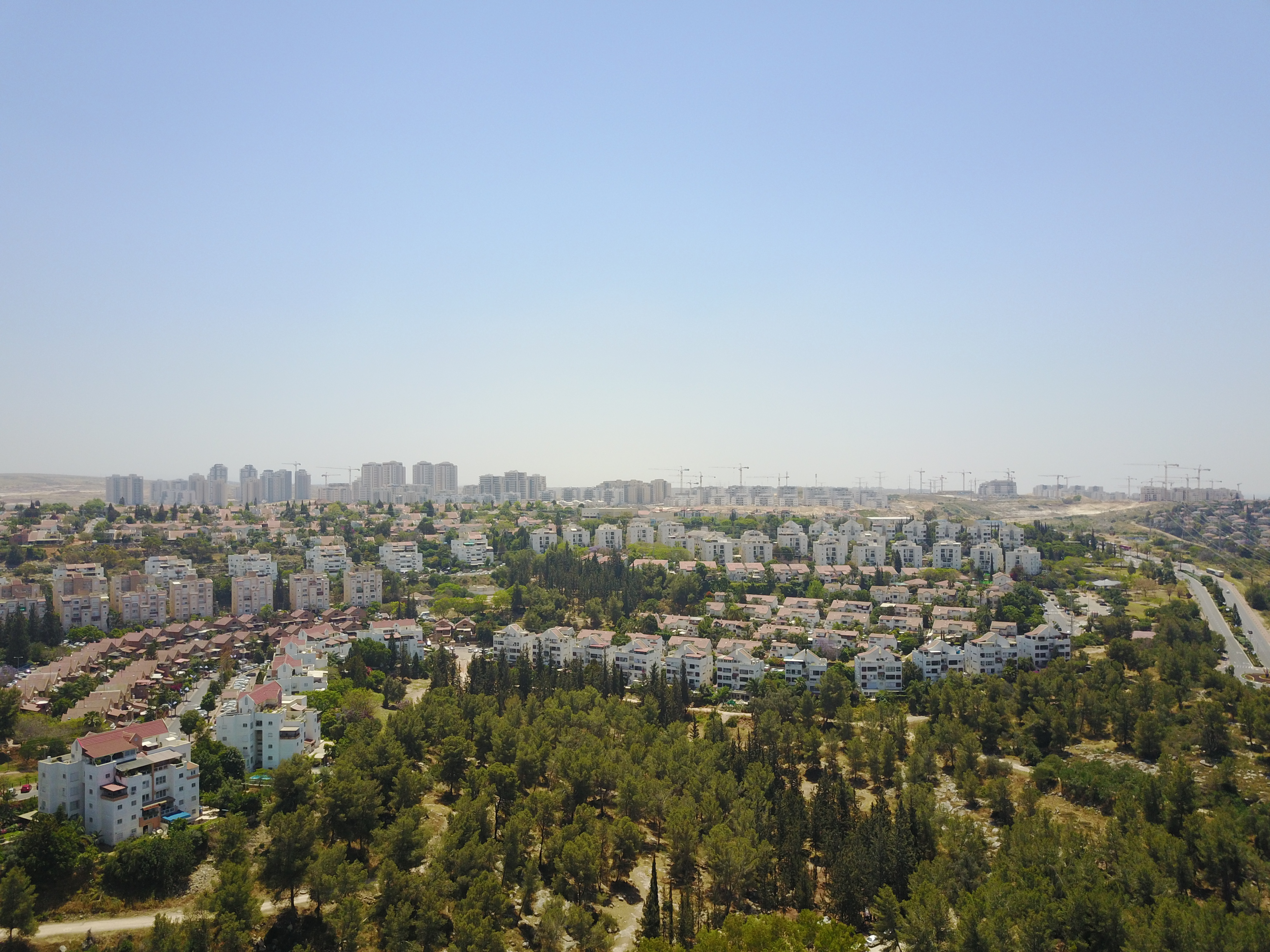
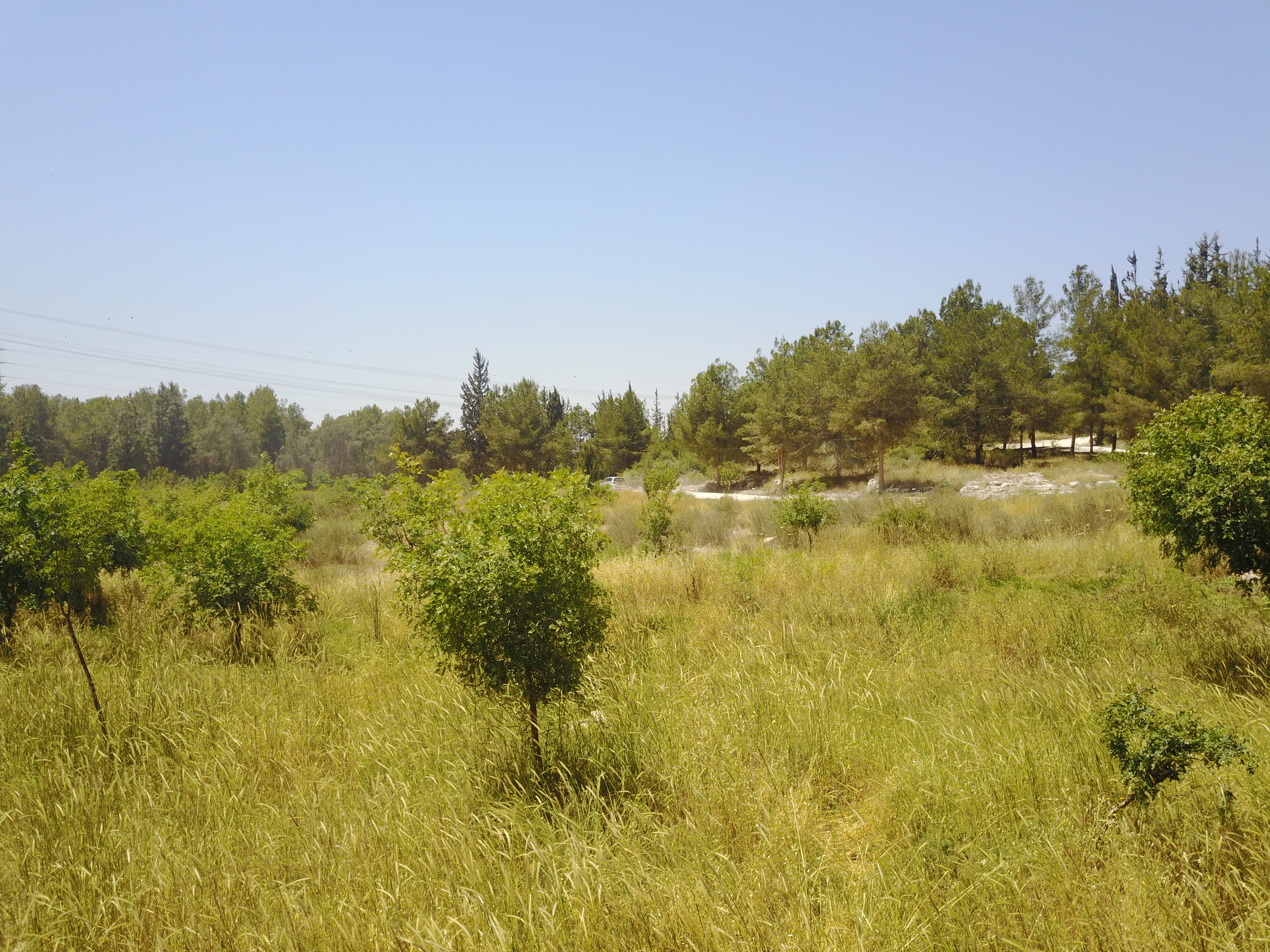
Left to right: Rosh HaAyin Forest images

The forest is known for its wildflower trail, where anemones, cyclamen, tulips, and other native flowers bloom during late winter and spring. The surrounding fields also display colorful blooms, attracting hikers and nature enthusiasts.

=== Rosh HaAyin Springs ===
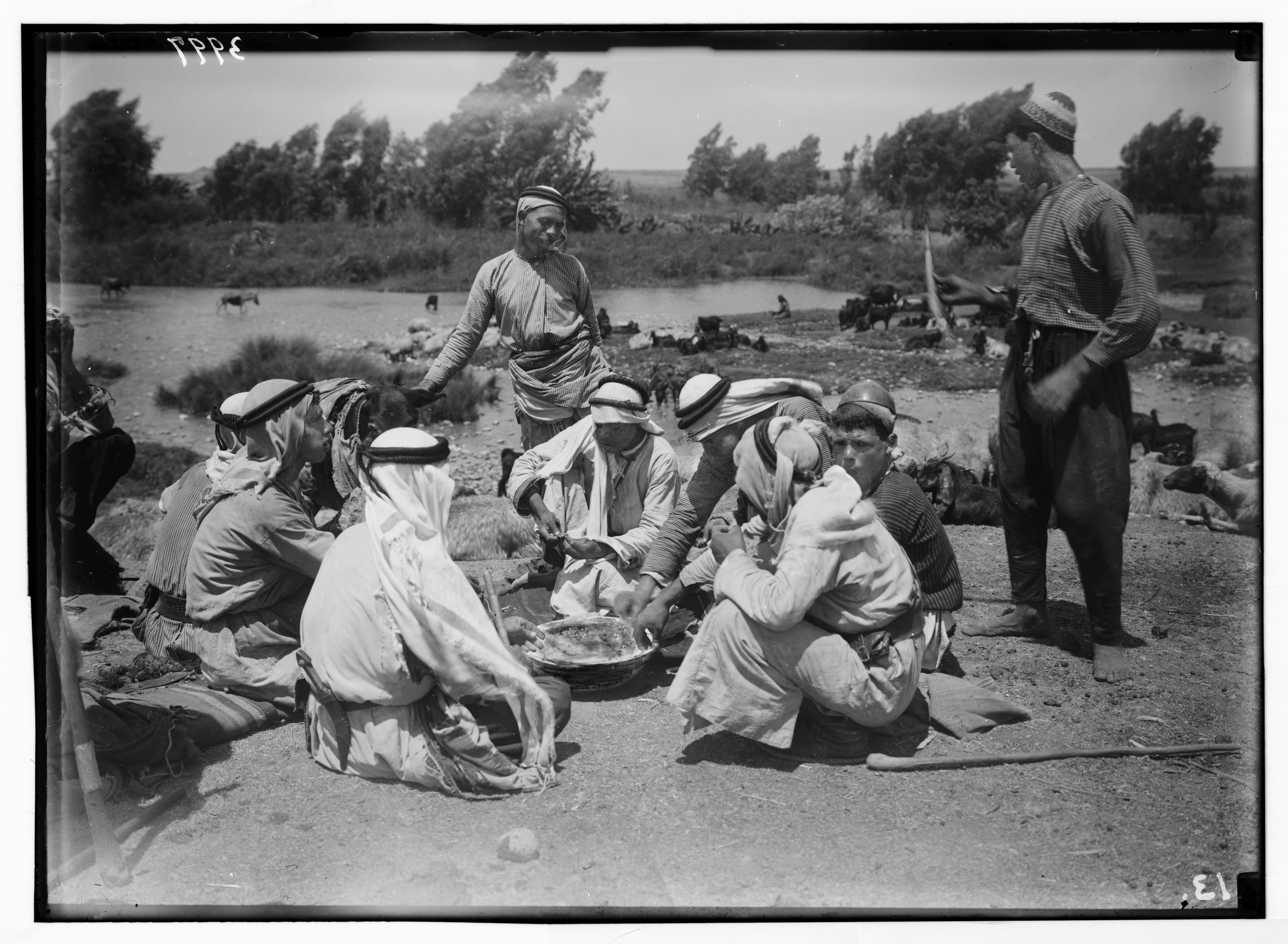
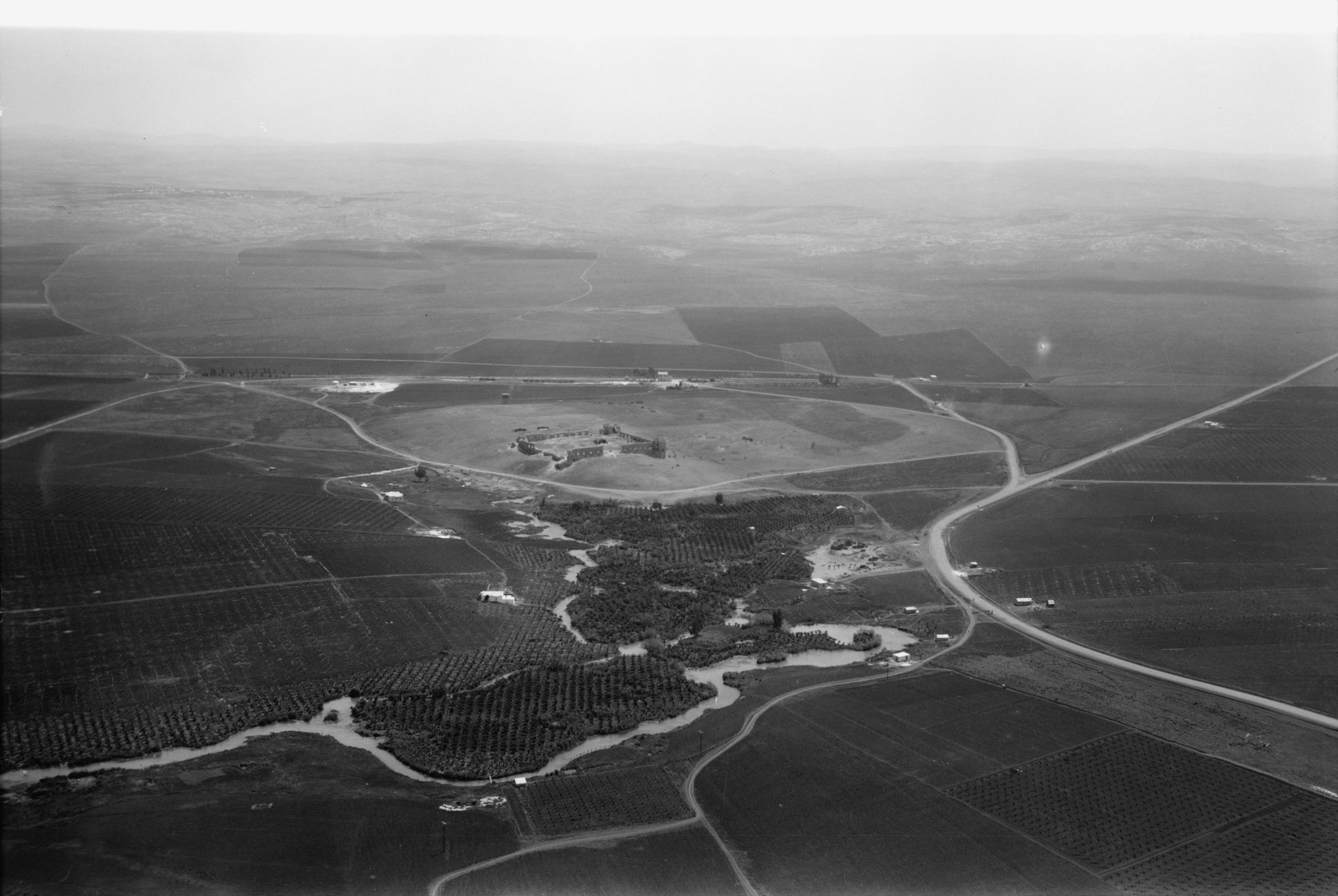
Left to right: Palestinian villagers at the springs in 1920, The springs from the air in 1932

The Rosh HaAyin springs, also known as the Yarkon springs or Ra's al-'Ayn springs, are a group of freshwater springs located at the foot of Tel Afek within Yarkon National Park. Historically, they were one of the main sources of the Yarkon River.

In the 1930s, the British authorities built the Yarkon–Jerusalem water pipeline to provide drinking water to Jerusalem. Water was pumped from the springs via Sha'ar HaGai and up to the city. During the British Mandate, the springs supplied 13,000 cubic meters of water daily to Jerusalem residents.

In the 1950s, Israeli Prime Minister David Ben-Gurion initiated the Yarkon–Negev water pipeline to support settlement in the Negev. Old American WWII destroyer engines were repurposed as pumps and buried under an armored hill near Givat HaShlosha to protect them from potential shelling from nearby Jordan. The pipeline was inaugurated in 1955 and later integrated into the national water carrier system.

By the 1960s, about 90% of the Yarkon's flow was diverted to supply Tel Aviv and southern Israel. This diversion significantly reduced the river's flow, sometimes to the point of drying up, leading to environmental degradation in the river channel.

== Municipal leadership ==
- In 1951, a Permanent Settlement was established in Rosh HaAyin, managed by a local committee.
- In 1954, the Minister of the Interior appointed an interim council to govern the settlement.
- In 1955, Zecharia Moshe became the first elected head of the local council.
- Shalom Mantsura: 1960 – January 1962, 1965 – 1969, May 1972 – July 1973
- Shlomo Tzafar: January 1962 – ?, July 1973 – February 1974
- Yosef Melamed: 1969 – 1972, 1978 – 1983
- Yigal Yosef: 1983 – 2003
- Moshe Sinai: Mayor from 2003 – 2013
- Shalom Ben-Moshe: Mayor from October 22, 2013, to February 27, 2024 (son of the first council head, Zecharia Moshe)
- Raz Shagai: Mayor since February 28, 2024

== Voting Patterns ==
In the 2022 election, 56 percent of voters in Rosh HaAyin voted for the parties of the right-wing coalition led by Benjamin Netanyahu, while 41 percent voted for the parties of the center-left coalition led by Yair Lapid and 0.1 percent voted for the Arab parties.

In the 2026 election, 52 percent of voters in Rosh HaAyin voted for the parties of the right-wing coalition led by Benjamin Netanyahu, while 41 percent voted for the parties of the center-left coalition led by Gadi Eisenkot and 0.1 percent voted for the Arab parties. An additional 4.2 percent voted for the Reservists, and 2.1 percent voted for Amcha Yisrael. Voter turnout increased 17 percent from the 2022 election.

== Notable people ==
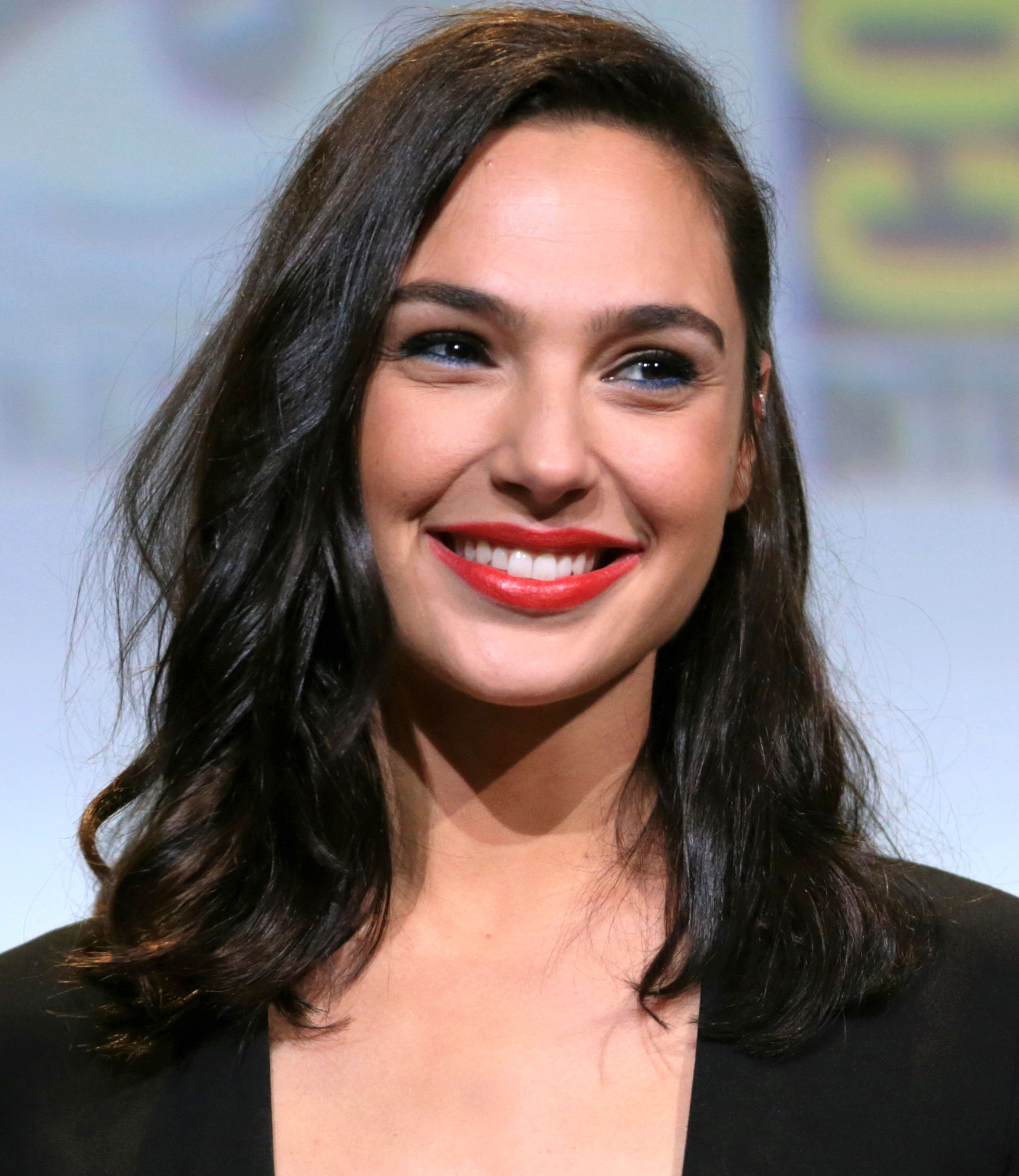
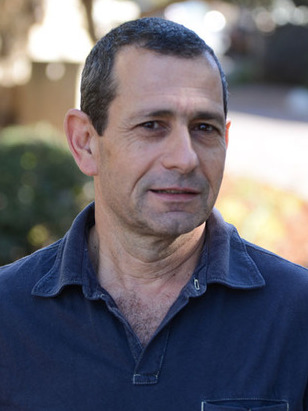
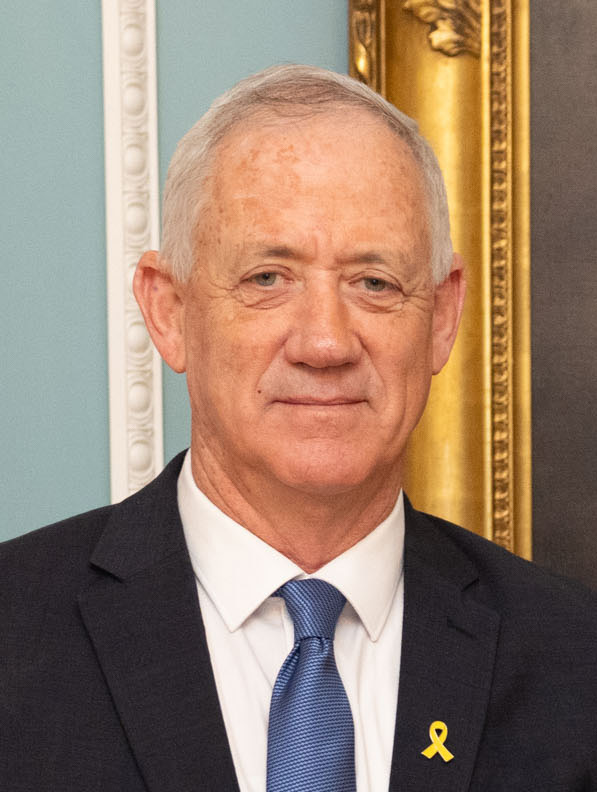
From left to right: Gal Gadot, actress and former Miss Israel 2004; Nadav Argaman, former head of Shin Bet; Benny Gantz, former Chief of the General Staff of the Israel Defense Forces and former Minister of Defense.
- Nadav Argaman (born 1960), former head of Shin Bet (Israel Security Agency)
- Eitan Cabel (born 1959), politician
- Sagiv Cohen (born 1987), footballer
- Omer Danino (born 1995), footballer
- Gal Gadot (born 1985), actress, producer, model, and former Miss Israel
- Benny Gantz (born 1959), former Chief of General Staff of the Israel Defense Forces; former Minister of Defense and Deputy Prime Minister
- Odelya Halevi (born 1989), actress
- Yishai Levi (1963-2026), singer
- Omer Peretz (born 1990), footballer
- Tom Reuveny (born 2000), Olympic champion windsurfing sailor

== Twin towns – sister cities ==
- Kiryat Bialik, Israel
- Hurfeish, Israel
- New Orleans, United States
- Birmingham, United States
- Prague 1, Czech Republic
- Odesa, Ukraine
- Vanves, France
- Cixi, China

== Gallery ==
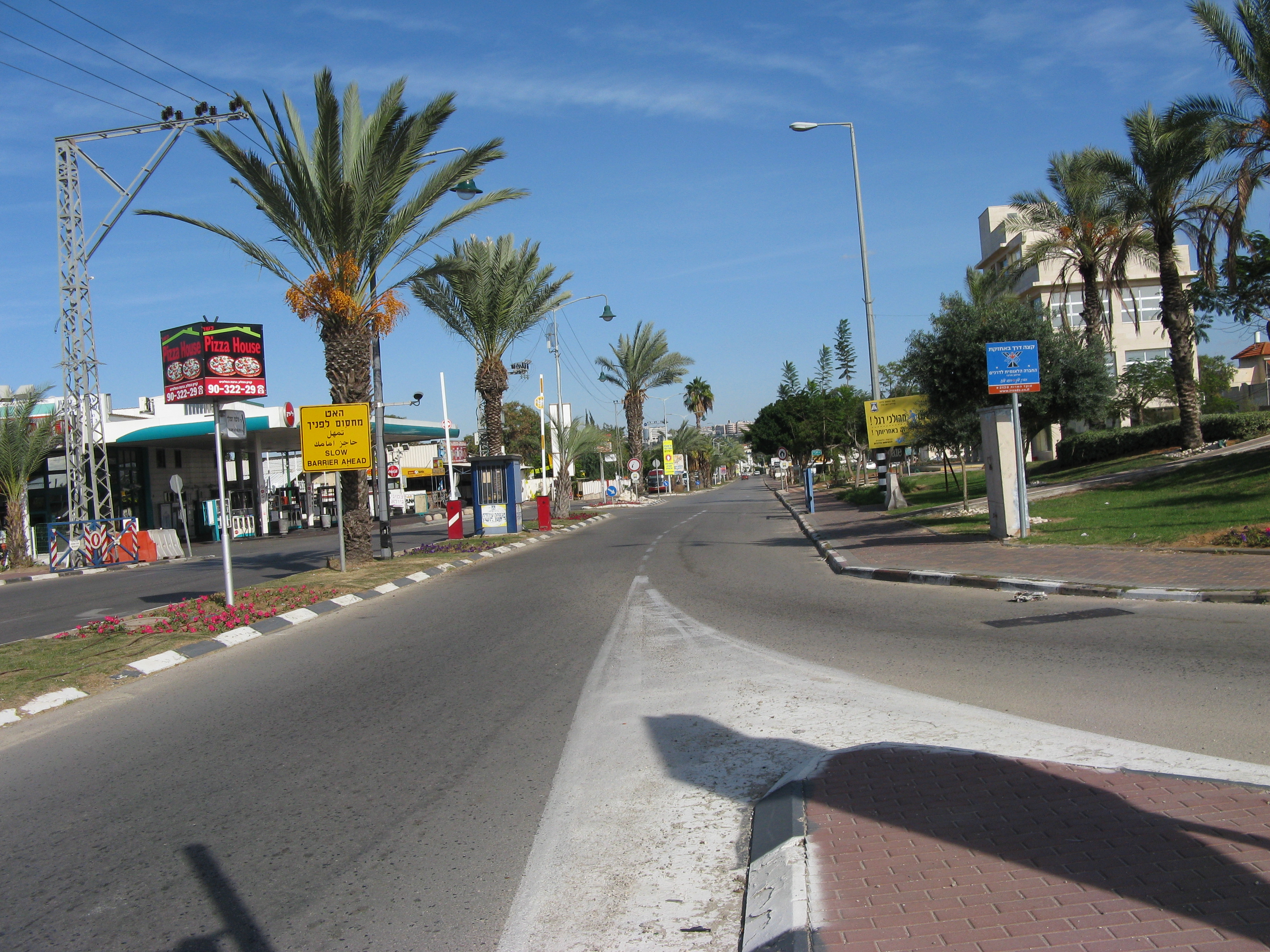
Entrance to Rosh HaAyin

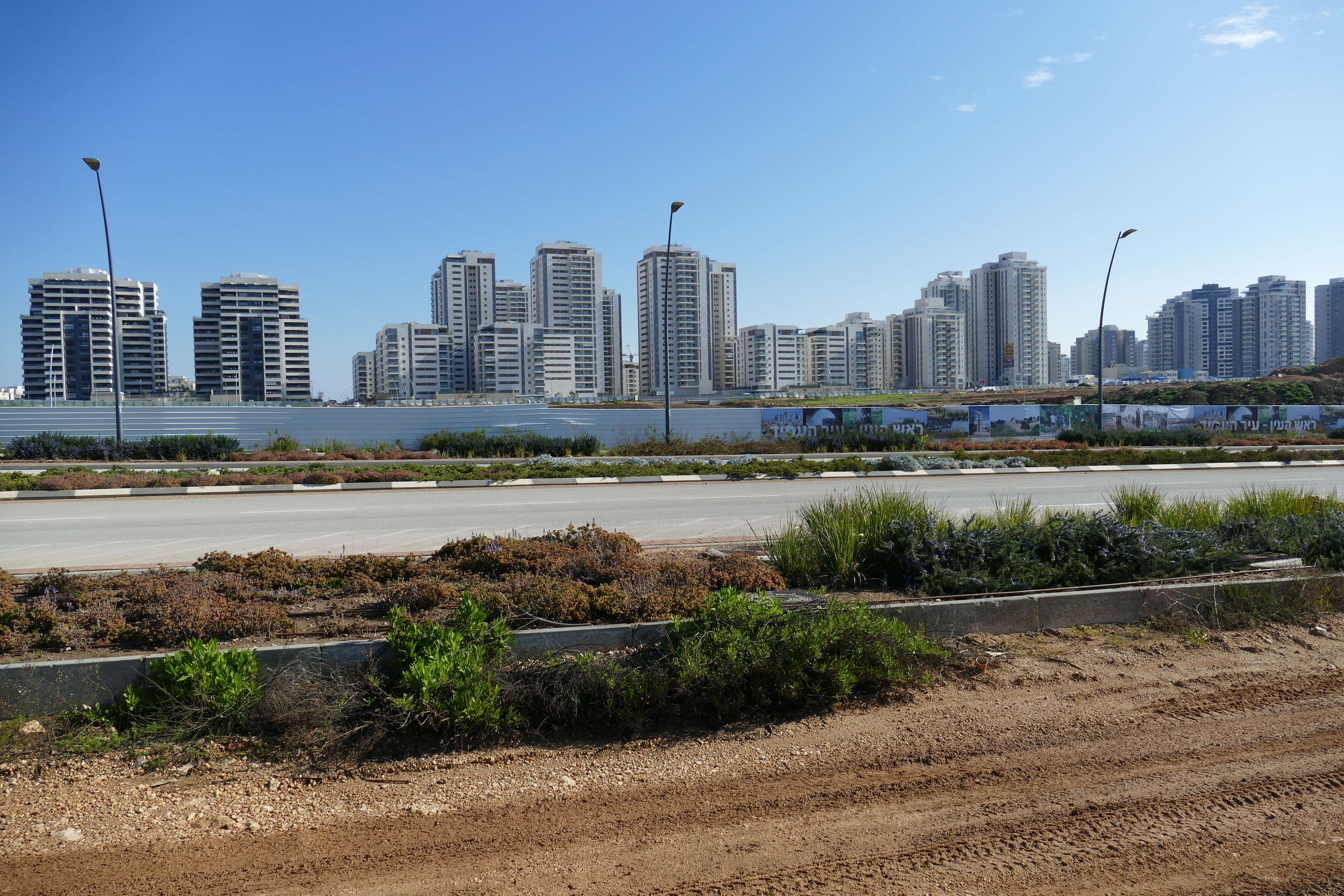
Khalat-as-Sahrij

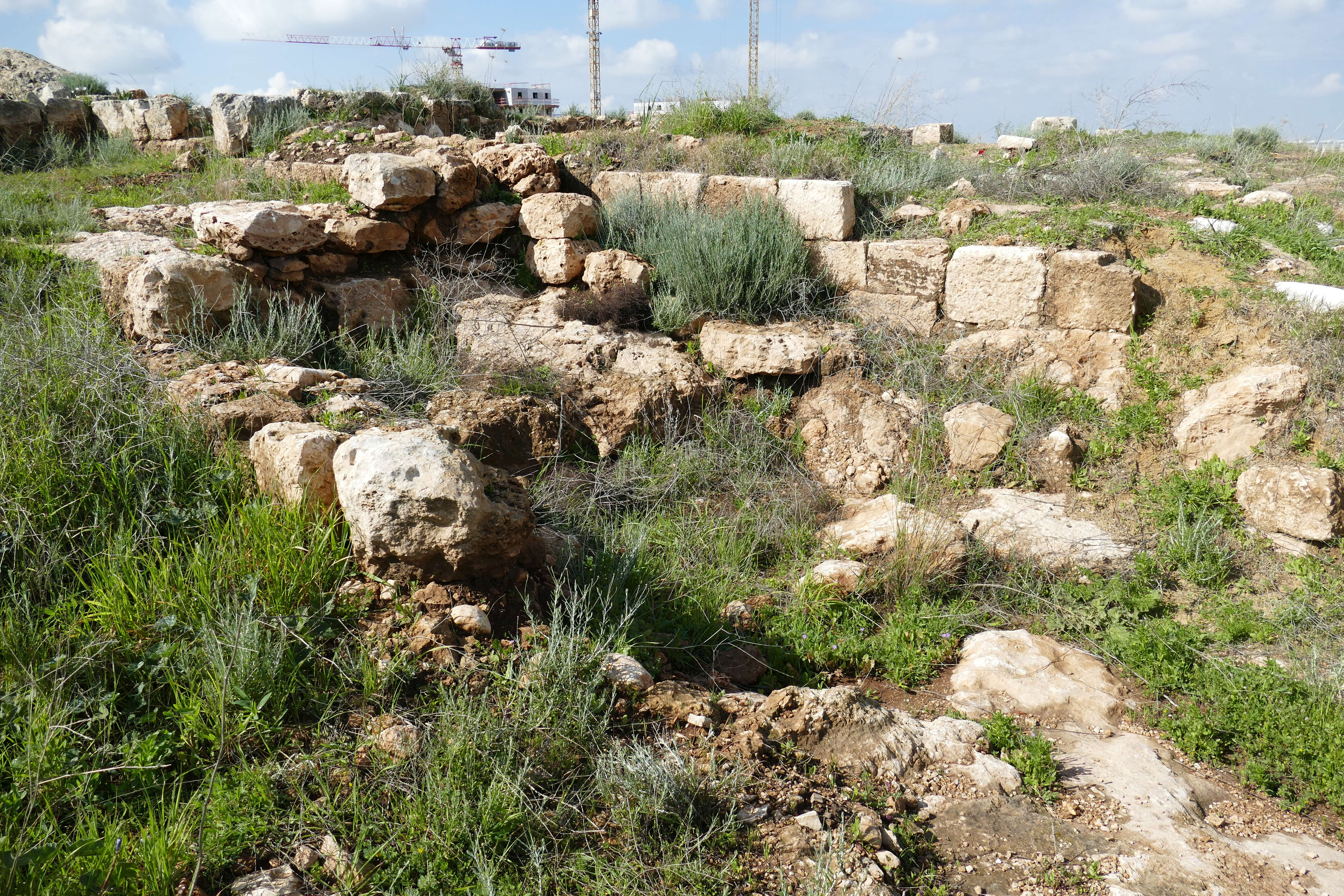
Hurvat Teena

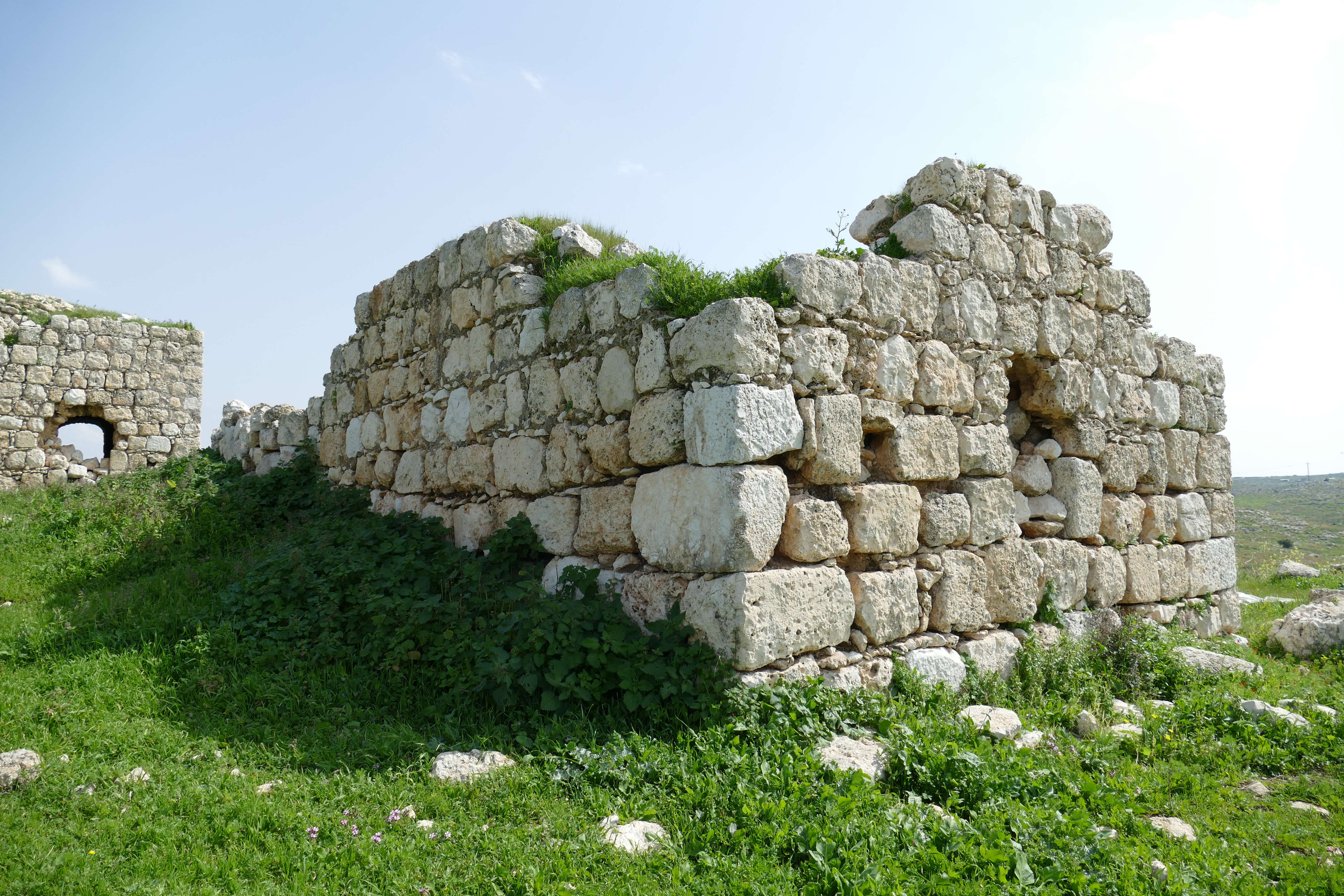
Khibet Umm el-Hamam, a ruin on southern outskirts of Rosh Ha-Ayin, Israel

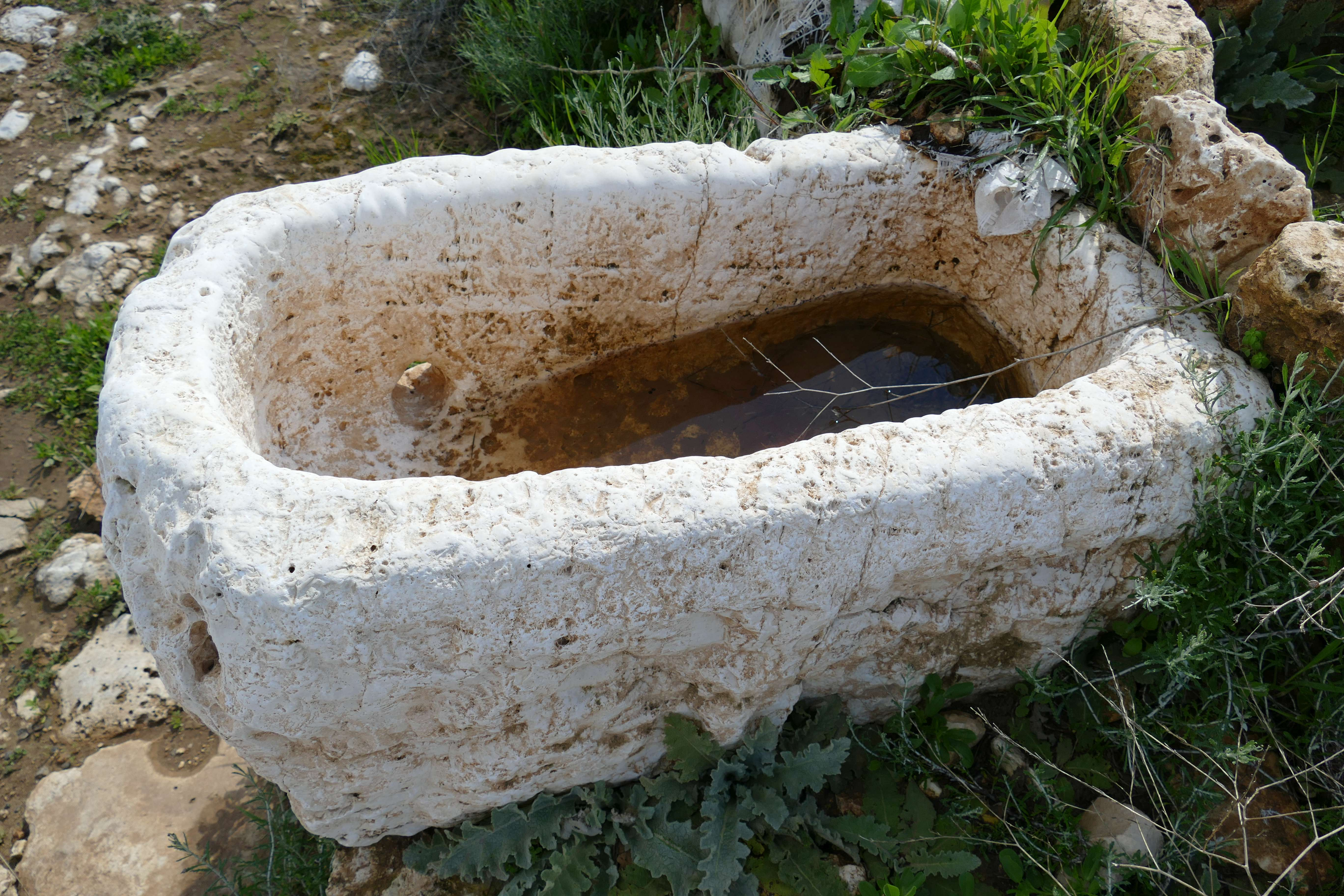
A stone structure with water at Hurvat Teena

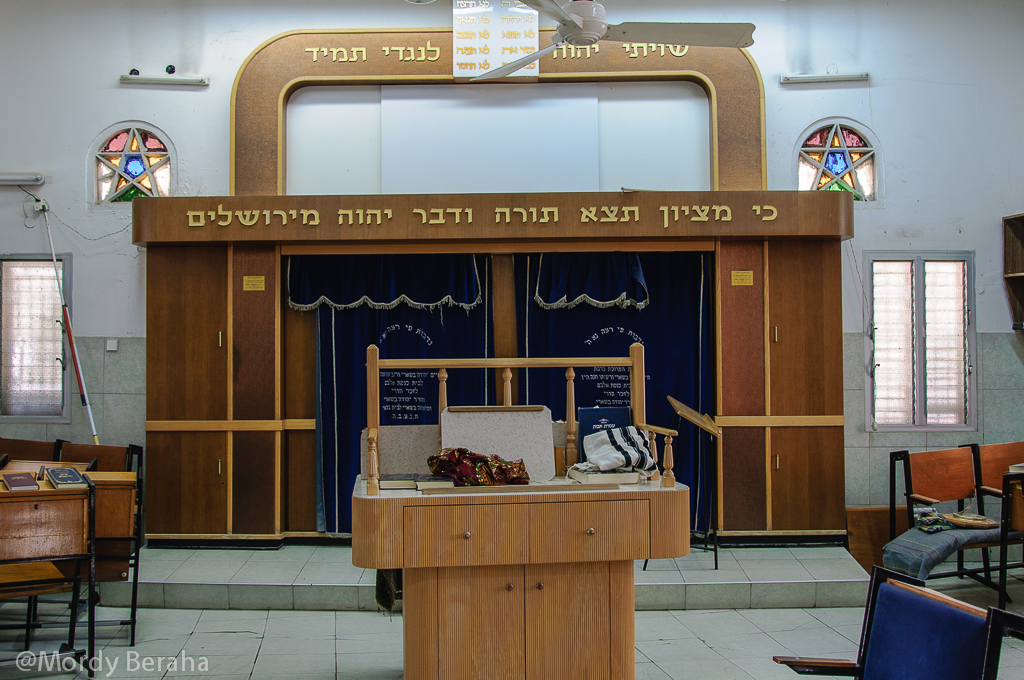
Albom Synagogue in Rosh HaAyin

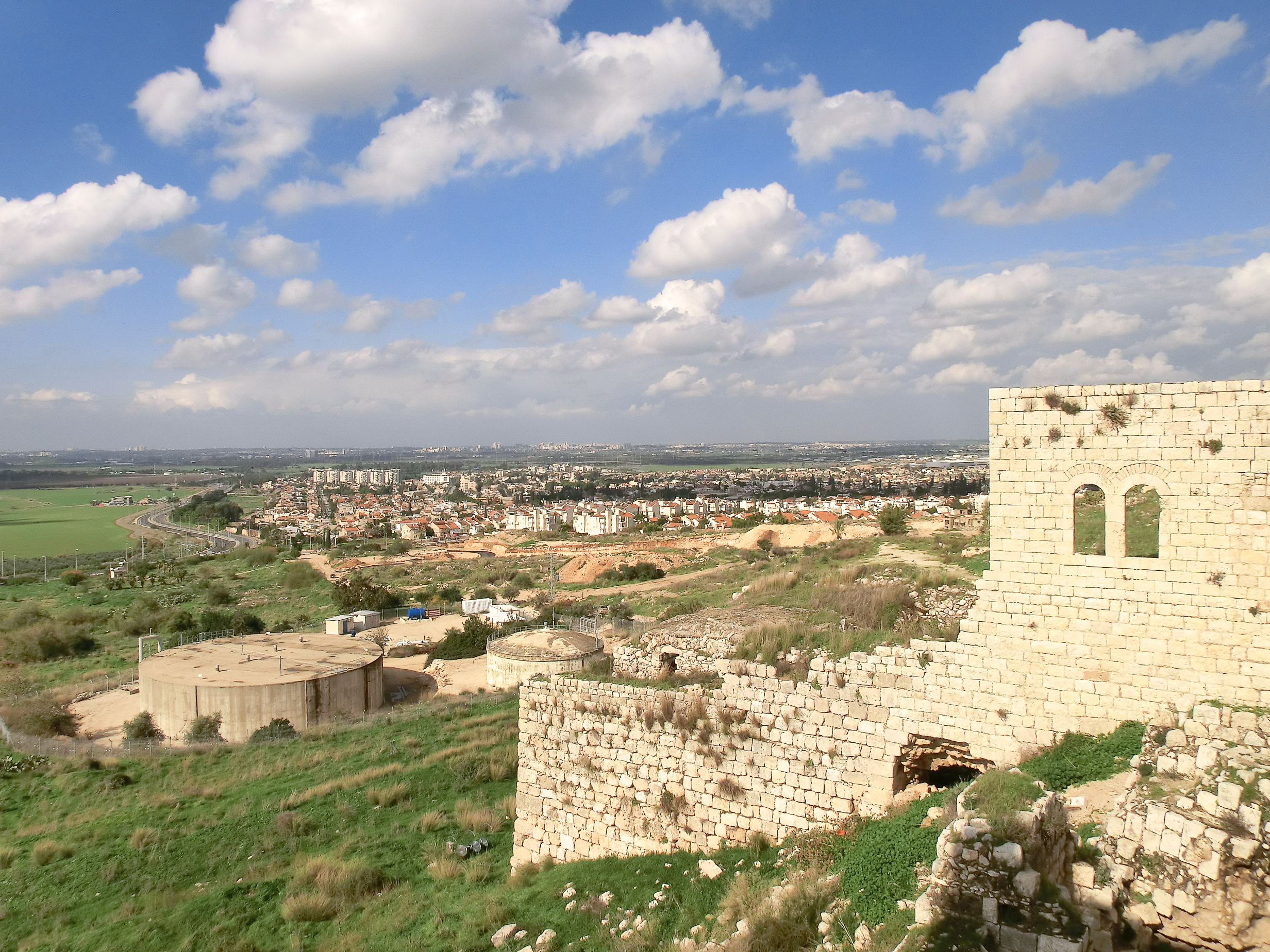
Migdal Afek

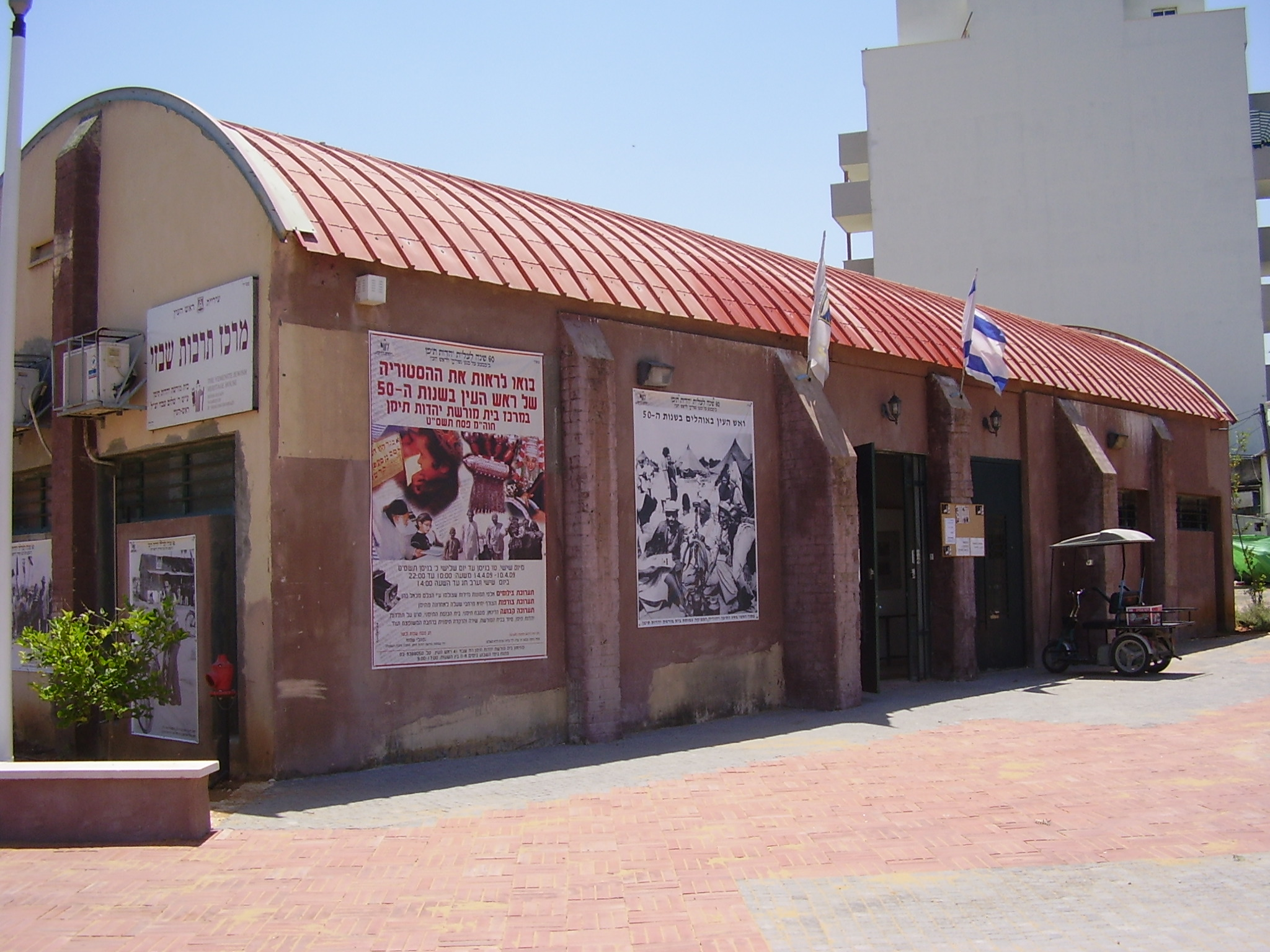
Yemenite Jewish heritage house)

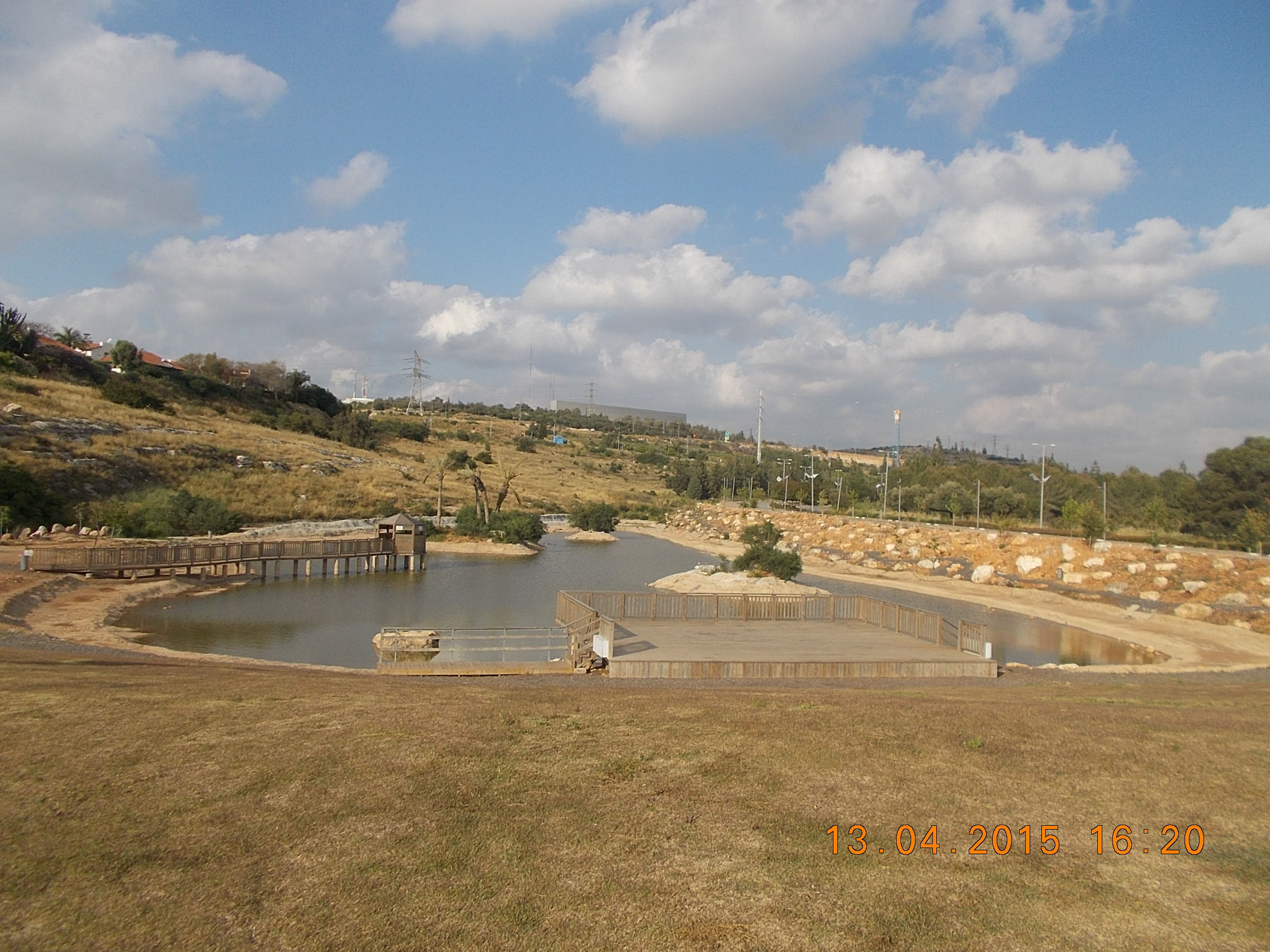
Lake of Sounds, in Rosh HaAyin

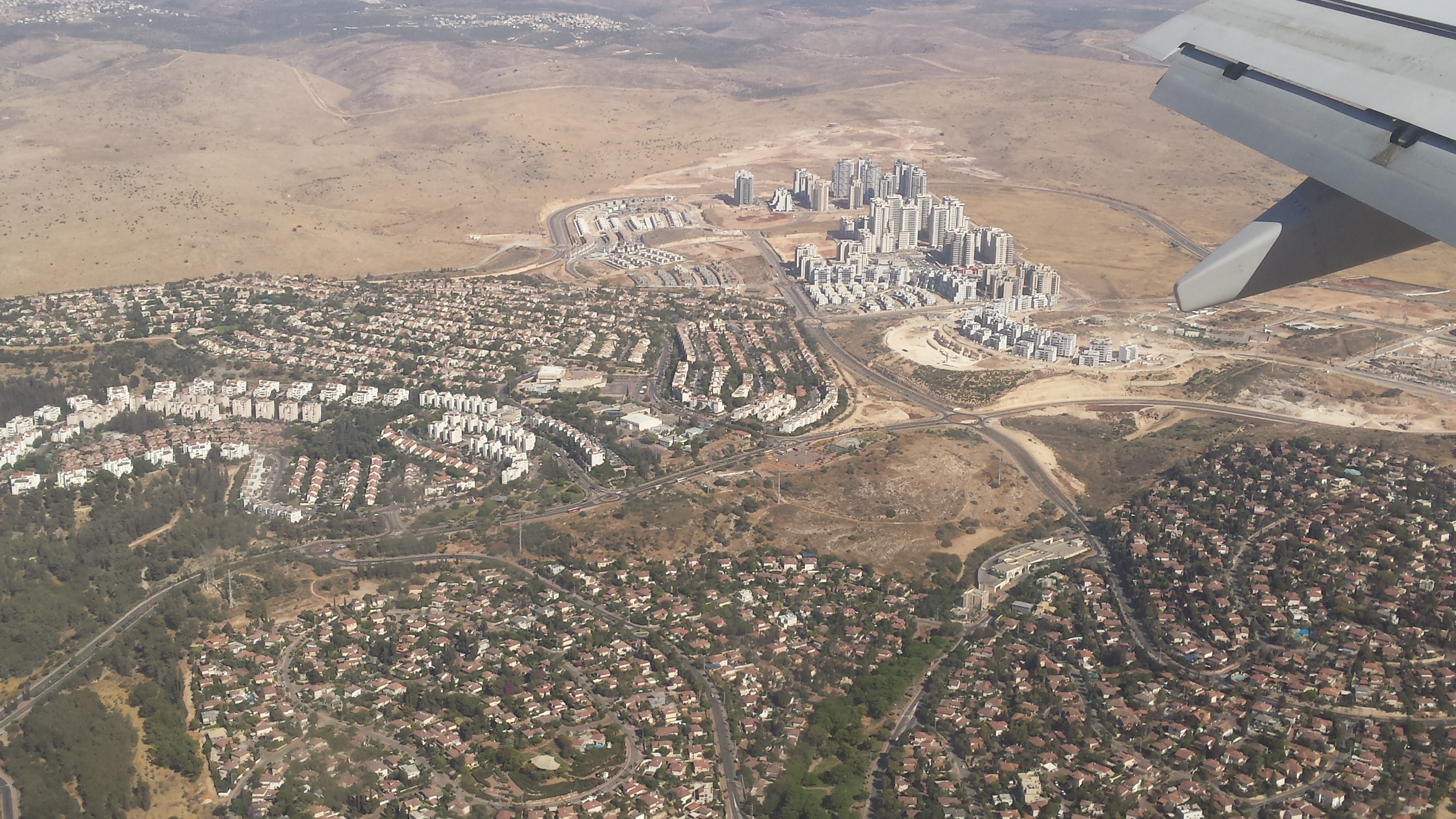
Aerial view of Rosh HaAyin (2017)

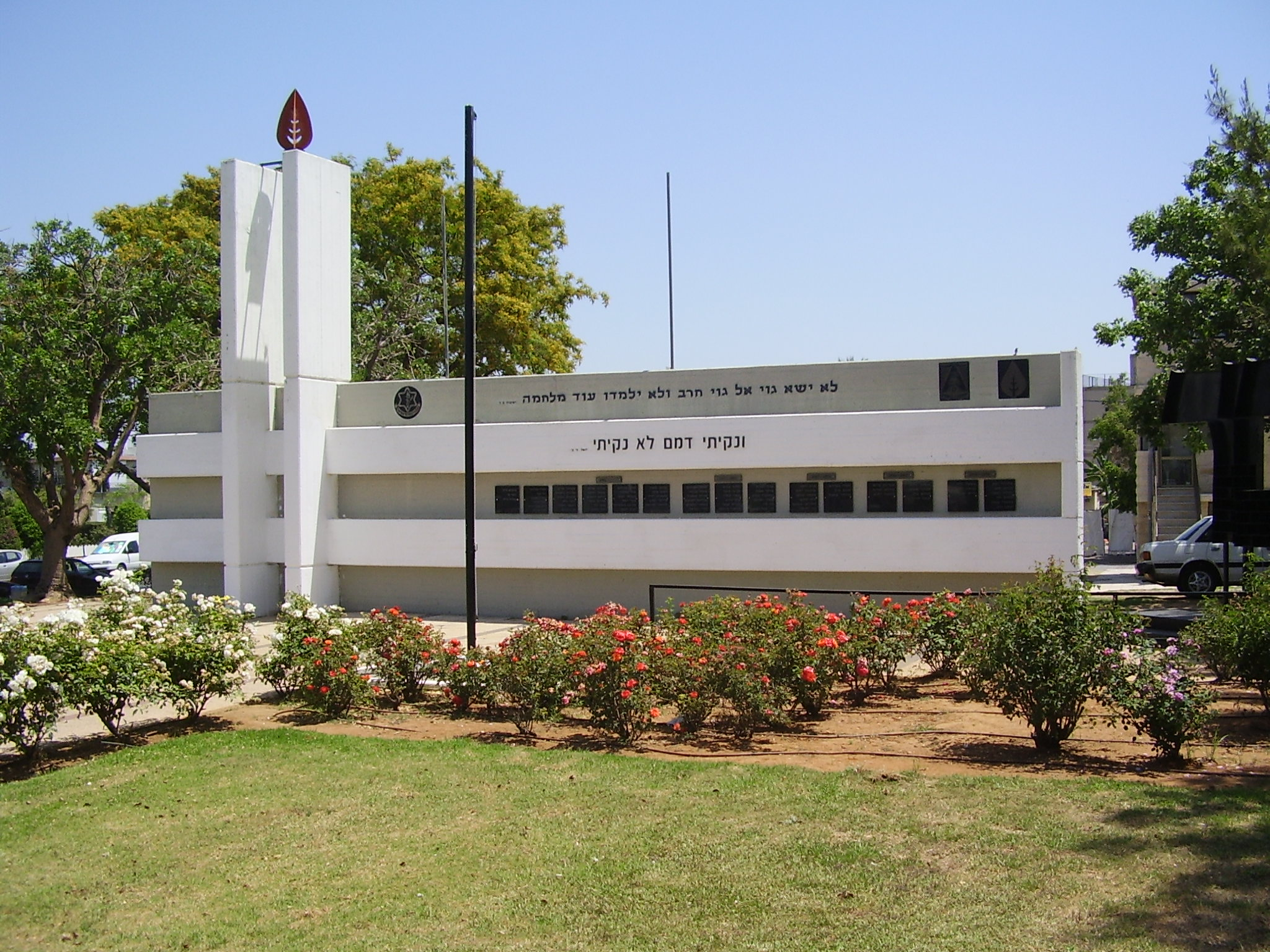
War Memorial in Rosh HaAyin

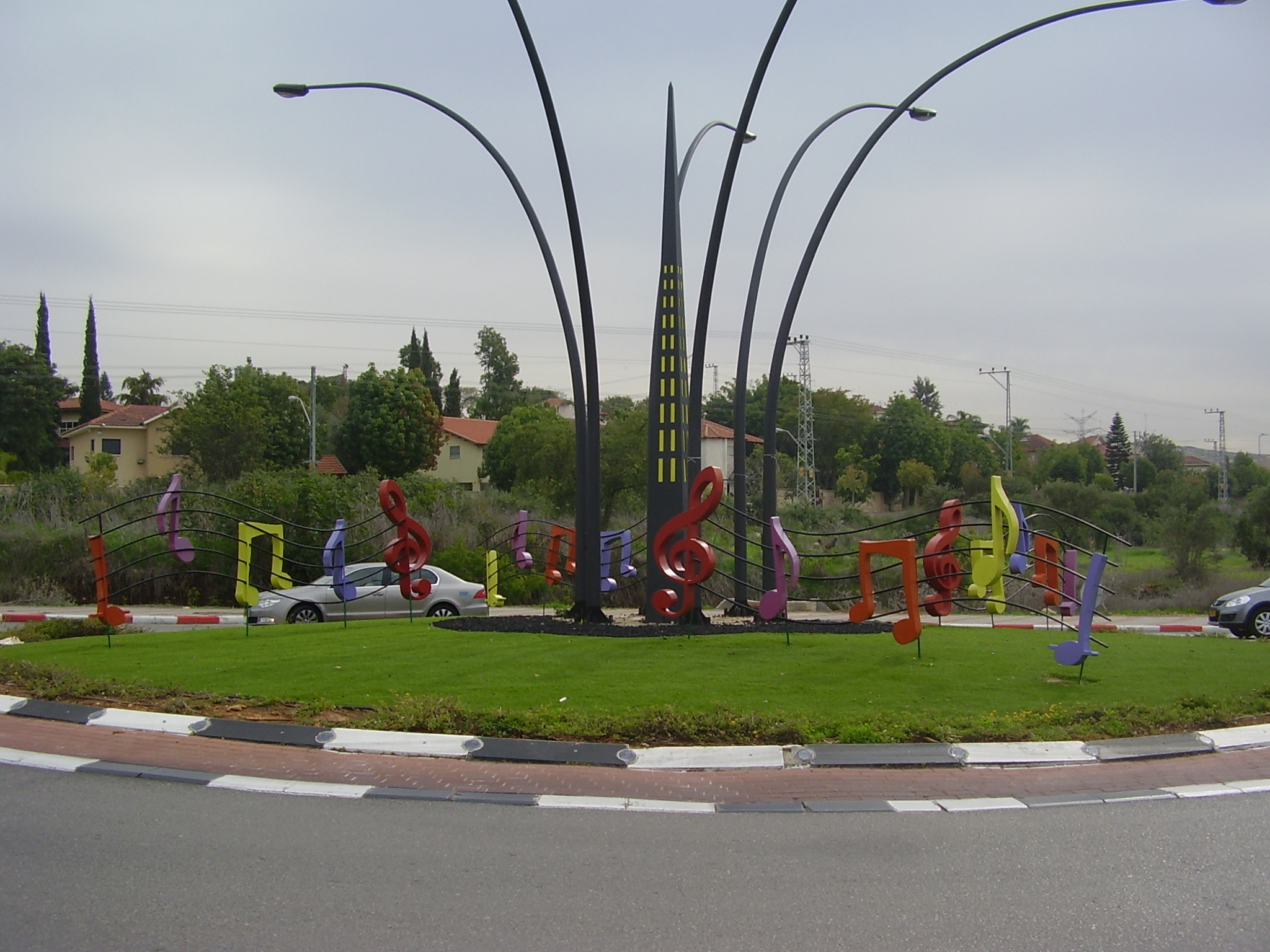
Rosh HaAyin, the city of music. Square of Notes (Israel Primo sculpture).

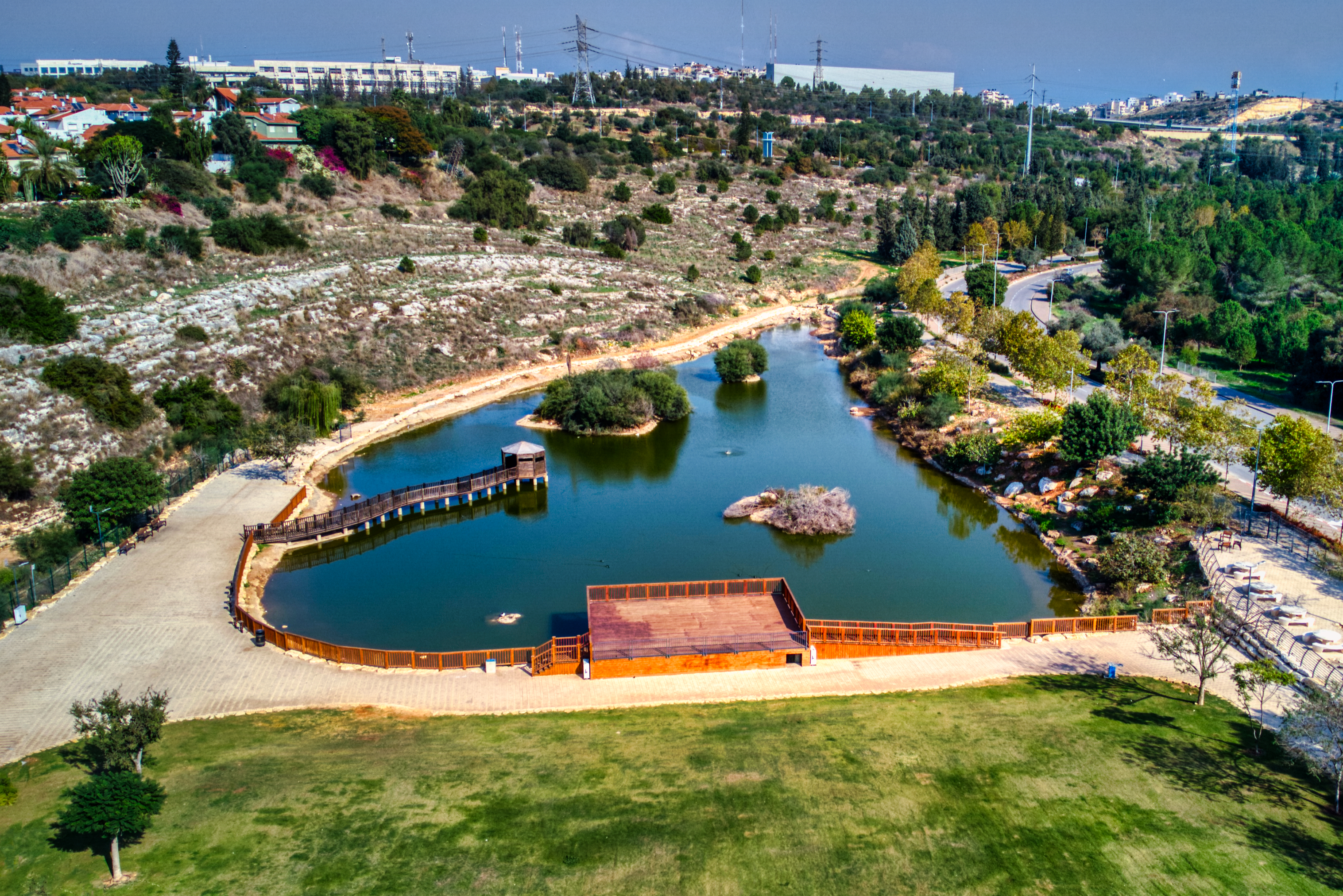
Sounds Lake, Rosh HaAyin

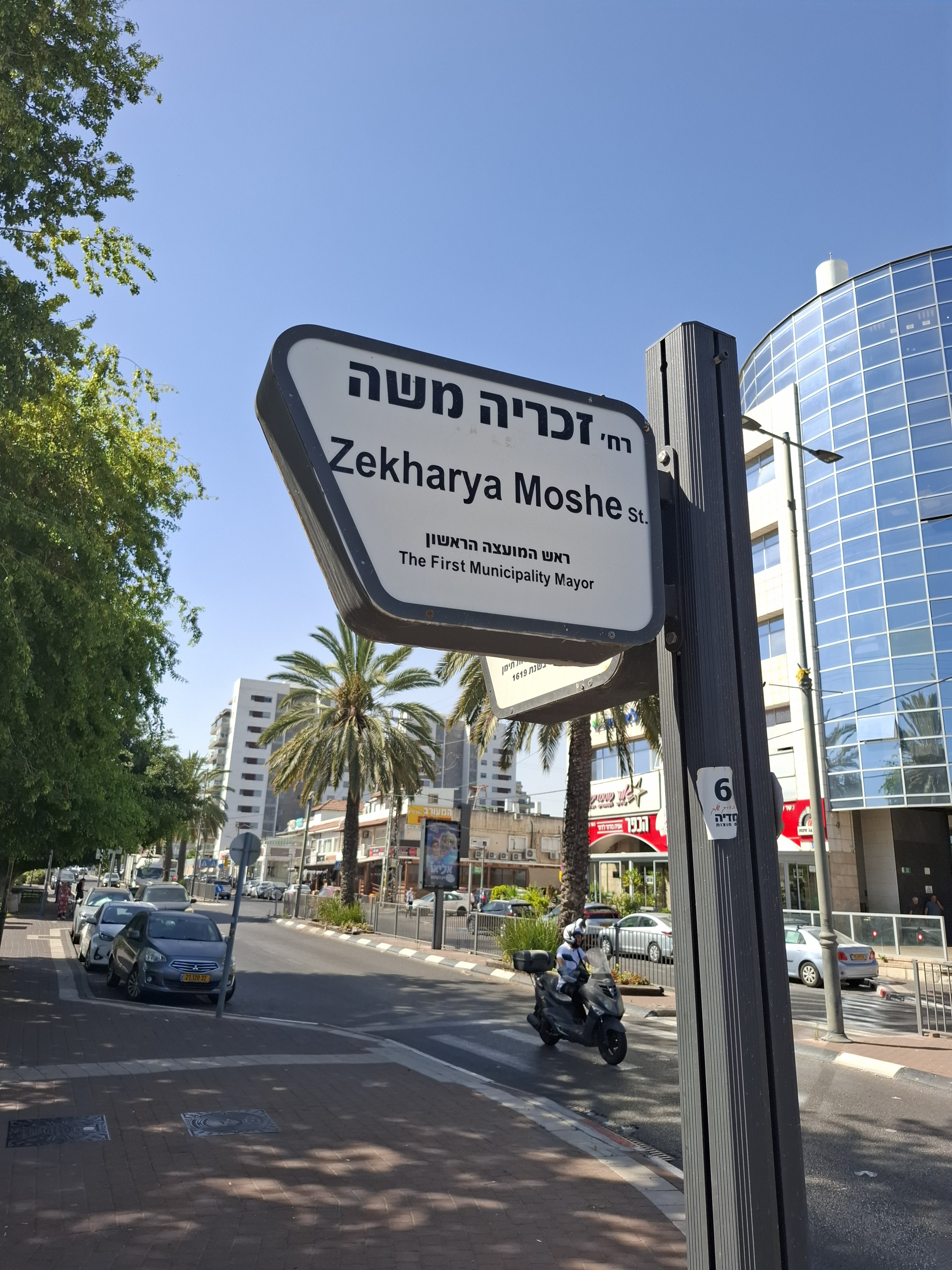
