= 2018 Israeli Beach Soccer League =

Tournament details
- Host country: Israel
- Dates: 8 June – 27 July 2018
- Teams: 12 (from 1 confederation)
- Venue(s): 1 (in 1 host city)

Final positions
- Champions: Maccabi "RE/MAX" Netanya (4th title)
- Runners-up: Bnei "Falfala" Kfar Qassem

Tournament statistics
- Matches played: 40
- Goals scored: 319 (7.98 per match)
- Top scorer(s): (Israel) Shalom Edri (Israel) Elihay Tzabari (Bulgaria) Filip Filipov (12 goals)

The 2018 Israeli Beach Soccer League was a national beach soccer league event that took place between 8 June and 27 July 2018, in Netanya, Israel.

Schedule of matches was published on the official Facebook page of Israeli Beach Soccer League.

== Group stage ==
All kickoff times are of local time in Netanya, Israel (UTC+02:00).

=== Group A ===
Pos	Team	Pld	W	W+	WP	L	GF	GA	GD	Pts	Qualification
1	Maccabi "RE/MAX" Netanya	5	3	1	0	1	22	11	+11	12	Clinched quarterfinal berth
2	Hapoel "Yahalomit Peretz/Taglit" Karmiel	5	4	0	0	1	28	23	+5	12	Clinched quarterfinal berth
3	"KELME" Be'er Sheva	5	2	1	0	2	26	28	−2	9	Clinched quarterfinal berth
4	Hapoel "Sportball" Hedera	5	1	1	1	2	17	20	−3	8	Clinched quarterfinal berth
5	Hapoel "Millennium Terminal" Ashkelon	5	1	0	0	4	13	16	−3	3	Clinched relegation playoffs
6	Hapoel "A. Tahzokat Otobosim" Petah Tikva	5	0	0	0	5	19	28	−9	0	Clinched relegation playoffs

8 June 2018
13:00

Hapoel "Millennium Terminal" Ashkelon	3 - 3 (a.e.t.)	Hapoel "Sportball" Hedera
A. Yakobi 26', 32'; D. Tsao 28'	Report	6', 11' O. Boaron; 24' N. Mechani
Penalties
D. Tsao (penalty missed); G. Gilkarov (penalty scored); I. Berkovic (penalty missed)	1 - 2	(penalty missed) O. Boaron; (penalty scored) B. Elsabri; (penalty scored) N. Mechani

"MODY" Arena, Poleg Beach, Netanya
Referee: Alon Yefet & Guy Berger
8 June 2018
14:50

"KELME" Be'er Sheva	7 - 6	Hapoel "A. Tahzokat Otobosim" Petah Tikva
T. Goto 2', 35'; F. Filipov 7', 8', 27'; E. Iluz 14'; A. Tanami 21'	Report	10' B. Siman Tov; 14' O. Ilos; 16' M. Fudi; 18' G. Hasan; 27' T. Ilos; 35' D. Gomez

"MODY" Arena, Poleg Beach, Netanya
Referee: Alon Yefet & Guy Berger
8 June 2018
17:20

Maccabi "RE/MAX" Netanya	3 - 2 (a.e.t.)	Hapoel "Yahalomit Peretz/Taglit" Karmiel
E. Carrera 2'; K. Badash 15'; Fran 38'	Report	18' Madjer; 23' E. Tzabari

"MODY" Arena, Poleg Beach, Netanya
Referee: Eli Hacmon

15 June 2018
13:50

Hapoel "Sportball" Hedera	5 - 6	Hapoel "Yahalomit Peretz/Taglit" Karmiel
D. Yampolsky 11'; M. Kirtava 16', 35'; N. Mechani 25'; E. Ben Menashe 31'	Report	7', 11' E. Tzabari; 13', 27' A. Levi; 18', 32' T. Azulay

"MODY" Arena, Poleg Beach, Netanya
Referee: Alon Yefet & Eli Hacmon
15 June 2018
15:40

"KELME" Be'er Sheva	3 - 2	Hapoel "Millennium Terminal" Ashkelon
F. Filipov 17'; Matan Cohen 23'; Reyder 35'	Report	24', 25' D. Malca

"MODY" Arena, Poleg Beach, Netanya
15 June 2018
17:20

Hapoel "A. Tahzokat Otobosim" Petah Tikva	2 - 6	Maccabi "RE/MAX" Netanya
O. Ilos 3', 34'	Report	2' Fran; 23' B. Briga; 26' (pen.), 27' E. Carrera; 30' Heverton; 34' R. Zarka

"MODY" Arena, Poleg Beach, Netanya
Referee: Meir Levi & Moshe Bohbot

22 June 2018
13:50

Hapoel "Yahalomit Peretz/Taglit" Karmiel	4 - 3	Hapoel "Millennium Terminal" Ashkelon
E. Tzabari 1' (pen.); S. Gormezano 25', 30'; T. Azulay 34'	Report	11' D. Malca; 20' S. Kogan; 24' D. Tsao

"MODY" Arena, Poleg Beach, Netanya
Referee: Alon Yefet & Meir Levi
22 June 2018
15:40

Hapoel "Sportball" Hedera	3 - 2	Hapoel "A. Tahzokat Otobosim" Petah Tikva
M. Kirtava 13'; E. Ben Menashe 28'; N. Mechani 33'	Report	21' T. Ilos; 26' M. Fudi

"MODY" Arena, Poleg Beach, Netanya
Referee: Eli Hacmon & Idan Bernstein
22 June 2018
17:20

Maccabi "RE/MAX" Netanya	5 - 6 (a.e.t.)	"KELME" Be'er Sheva
E. Carrera 10', 15'; Heverton 18'; B. Briga 26'; Fran 35'	Report	7', 10', 20', 38' F. Filipov; 16' T. Goto; 27' Matan Cohen

"MODY" Arena, Poleg Beach, Netanya
Referee: Eli Hacmon & Idan Bernstein

29 June 2018
13:50

"KELME" Be'er Sheva	5 - 6 (a.e.t.)	Hapoel "Sportball" Hedera
F. Filipov 6', 7', 27'; T. Goto 13'; Reyder 23'; Matan Cohen (red card) 36'	Report	10', 36' N. Mechani; 15' B. Shem Tov; 26', 36' (pen.) M. Kirtava; 30' A. Cohen

"MODY" Arena, Poleg Beach, Netanya
Referee: Alon Yefet, Guy Berger & Omer Barbiro
29 June 2018
16:30

Hapoel "A. Tahzokat Otobosim" Petah Tikva	7 - 8	Hapoel "Yahalomit Peretz/Taglit" Karmiel
T. Ilos 11', 15', 24', 27'; D. Gomez 20'; O. Vaknin 30', 31'	Report	7' O. Ifrah; 10' (pen.), 15', 22' D. Halevi; 12' E. Tzabari; 13', 24' S. Gormezano; 26' A. Levi

"MODY" Arena, Poleg Beach, Netanya
Referee: Eli Hacmon, Idan Bernstein & Noam Salooma
29 June 2018
17:20

Hapoel "Millennium Terminal" Ashkelon	1 - 4	Maccabi "RE/MAX" Netanya
D. Tsao 27', (red card) 36'	Report	6' (pen.), 24' K. Badash; 20' B. Briga; 23' (pen.) Domi

"MODY" Arena, Poleg Beach, Netanya
Referee: Eli Hacmon, Idan Bernstein & Noam Salooma

6 July 2018
13:00

Hapoel "Millennium Terminal" Ashkelon	4 - 2	Hapoel "A. Tahzokat Otobosim" Petah Tikva
N. Hagani 5'; N. Mizrahi 19'; A. Yakobi 27'; S. Kogan 31'	Report	3' M. Fudi; 30' G. Hasan

"MODY" Arena, Poleg Beach, Netanya
Referee: Alon Yefet, Eli Hacmon & Roi Reinshreiber
6 July 2018
14:50

Hapoel "Yahalomit Peretz/Taglit" Karmiel	9 - 5	"KELME" Be'er Sheva
E. Tzabari 5', 14', 15', 21', 23', 31'; T. Azulay 17' (pen.); O. Halevi 26'; D. Halevi 33'	Report	20' Reyder; 22', 32' Ori Cohen; 23' I. Hershko; 24' Ramos

"MODY" Arena, Poleg Beach, Netanya
Referee: Alon Yefet, Eli Hacmon & Roi Reinshreiber
6 July 2018
17:20

Maccabi "RE/MAX" Netanya	4 - 0	Hapoel "Sportball" Hedera
Carrera 3', 26'; K. Badash 7'; Fran 20'	Report

"MODY" Arena, Poleg Beach, Netanya
Referee: Meir Levi, Moshe Bohbot & Igal Iskov

=== Group B ===
Pos	Team	Pld	W	W+	WP	L	GF	GA	GD	Pts	Qualification
1	Bnei "Falfala" Kfar Qassem	5	4	0	0	1	29	14	+15	12	Clinched quarterfinal berth
2	Beitar "Italy Gold Jewellery" Jerusalem	5	4	0	0	1	27	13	+14	12	Clinched quarterfinal berth
3	Ironi Rosh HaAyin	5	2	1	1	1	17	15	+2	11	Clinched quarterfinal berth
4	"Auto Hai" Bnei Yehuda	5	2	0	0	3	16	21	−5	6	Clinched quarterfinal berth
5	"Roah Bakfar" Tel Aviv	5	1	0	0	4	19	25	−6	3	Clinched relegation playoffs
6	A.F. "Claus Mashkaot" Holon	5	0	0	0	5	11	30	−19	0	Clinched relegation playoffs

8 June 2018
13:50

"Auto Hai" Bnei Yehuda	3 - 1	A.F. "Claus Mashkaot" Holon
E. Magol 8'; Joriel 23', 31'	Report	34' A. Zvulun

"MODY" Arena, Poleg Beach, Netanya
Referee: Alon Yefet & Guy Berger
8 June 2018
15:40

Bnei "Falfala" Kfar Qassem	9 - 2	"Roah Bakfar" Tel Aviv
Deiwerson 4'; H. Jabaren 9'; O. Zborovskyi 11', 21'; L. Levi 21' (o.g.); N. Sarsur 13', 17'; W. Agbaria 21'; A. Danin 34'	Report	27' R. Amir; 30' Meir Cohen

"MODY" Arena, Poleg Beach, Netanya
Referee: Alon Yefet & Guy Berger
8 June 2018
16:30

Ironi Rosh HaAyin	0 - 4	Beitar "Italy Gold Jewellery" Jerusalem
	Report	7', 14', 23' S. Edri; 32' Y. Benisho

"MODY" Arena, Poleg Beach, Netanya

15 June 2018
13:00

Ironi Rosh HaAyin	6 - 5 (a.e.t.)	"Auto Hai" Bnei Yehuda
F. Costa 4', 16', 18', 38'; D. Alberman 19'; N. Revivo 30'	Report	5', 32' Joriel; 10' A. Hakak; 20' E. Magol; 29' L. Nahum

"MODY" Arena, Poleg Beach, Netanya
Referee: Alon Yefet & Eli Hacmon
15 June 2018
14:50

A.F. "Claus Mashkaot" Holon	2 - 7	"Roah Bakfar" Tel Aviv
A. Marciano 19'; Y. Machluf 26'	Report	5' Y. Giladi; 9' Y. Sirotkin; 12' R. Amir; 14' O. Yehezkel; 18', 35' L. Asmara; 32' E. Babashvili

"MODY" Arena, Poleg Beach, Netanya
Referee: Eli Hacmon
15 June 2018
16:30

Beitar "Italy Gold Jewellery" Jerusalem	3 - 4	Bnei "Falfala" Kfar Qassem
N. Sapir 2'; N. Cohen 27'; S. Edri 28'	Report	3', 5', 30' O. Zborovskyi; 22' Deiwerson

"MODY" Arena, Poleg Beach, Netanya
Referee: Meir Levi & Moshe Bohbot

22 June 2018
13:00

Bnei "Falfala" Kfar Qassem	8 - 4	A.F. "Claus Mashkaot" Holon
W. Agbaria 14'; A. Yatim 15', 16'; N. Sarsur 20'; K. Frij 21'; H. Jabaren 25'; A. Danin 27'; O. Zborovskyi 36'	Report	1', 17', 18' A. Zvulun; 19' B. Tzabari

"MODY" Arena, Poleg Beach, Netanya
Referee: Alon Yefet & Meir Levi
22 June 2018
14:50

"Auto Hai" Bnei Yehuda	2 - 5	Beitar "Italy Gold Jewellery" Jerusalem
Joriel 2'; E. Magol 20'	Report	5', 32' S. Edri; 13', 14' I. Bar David; 27' E. Sasportas

"MODY" Arena, Poleg Beach, Netanya
Referee: Alon Yefet & Meir Levi
22 June 2018
16:30

Ironi Rosh HaAyin	3 - 3 (a.e.t.)	"Roah Bakfar" Tel Aviv
N. Revivo 1'; F. Costa 31'; C. Martinez 34'	Report	10' O. Yehezkel; 18' R. Amir; 36' R. Peretz
Penalties
F. Costa (penalty scored)	1 - 0	(penalty missed) Shaulsky

"MODY" Arena, Poleg Beach, Netanya
Referee: Eli Hacmon & Idan Bernstein

29 June 2018
13:00

"Roah Bakfar" Tel Aviv	4 - 7	Beitar "Italy Gold Jewellery" Jerusalem
Y. Giladi 6', 23', 30'; L. Asmara 20'	Report	5' S. Edri; 8', 32' Y. Benisho; 9', 11', 31' S. Hayat; 31' N. Cohen

"MODY" Arena, Poleg Beach, Netanya
Referee: Alon Yefet, Guy Berger & Omer Barbiro
29 June 2018
14:50

A.F. "Claus Mashkaot" Holon	1 - 5	Ironi Rosh HaAyin
T. Atrash 34'	Report	13' A. Farias; 31' A. Portelaa; 33' A. Abu Sbeet; 35' A. Ventura; 36' N. Revivo

"MODY" Arena, Poleg Beach, Netanya
Referee: Alon Yefet, Guy Berger & Omer Barbiro
29 June 2018
15:40

"Auto Hai" Bnei Yehuda	2 - 6	Bnei "Falfala" Kfar Qassem
L. Bahash 30'; E. Magol 35'	Report	1', 16', 26' W. Agbaria; 18', 21' O. Zborovskyi; 27' A. Danin

"MODY" Arena, Poleg Beach, Netanya
Referee: Eli Hacmon, Idan Bernstein & Noam Salooma

6 July 2018
13:50

"Roah Bakfar" Tel Aviv	3 - 4	"Auto Hai" Bnei Yehuda
O. Yehezkel 20'; L. Asmara 22', 25'	Report	5' A. Magol; 11', 29' L. Nahum; 36' E. Magol

"MODY" Arena, Poleg Beach, Netanya
Referee: Alon Yefet, Eli Hacmon & Roi Reinshreiber
6 July 2018
15:40

Beitar "Italy Gold Jewellery" Jerusalem	8 - 3	A.F. "Claus Mashkaot" Holon
N. Cohen 8', 27'; S. Edri 15', 25'; R. Amran 17'; E. Shemesh 21'; I. Bar David 23', 30'	Report	13' O. Halwani; 16' A. Marciano; 31' E. Psheatski

"MODY" Arena, Poleg Beach, Netanya
Referee: Meir Levi, Moshe Bohbot & Igal Iskov
6 July 2018
16:30

Bnei "Falfala" Kfar Qassem	2 - 3	Ironi Rosh HaAyin
K. Frij (red card) 23'; A. Yatim 29'; O. Zborovskyi 34'	Report	13' N. Revivo; 15', 23' A. Portelaa

"MODY" Arena, Poleg Beach, Netanya
Referee: Meir Levi, Moshe Bohbot & Igal Iskov

== Relegation playoffs (Loser on Final is relegated) ==
Semi-finals
13 July 2018
Hapoel "Millennium Terminal" Ashkelon	3
A.F. "Claus Mashkaot" Holon	4
13 July 2018
Hapoel "A. Tahzokat Otobosim" Petah Tikva	3
"Roah Bakfar" Tel Aviv	1

Final
27 July 2018
Hapoel "Millennium Terminal" Ashkelon	2
"Roah Bakfar" Tel Aviv	4

=== Relegation playoffs ===
13 July 2018
13:00

Hapoel "A. Tahzokat Otobosim" Petah Tikva	3 - 1	"Roah Bakfar" Tel Aviv
T. Ilos 16', 28' (pen.); E. Elimelech 19'	Report	13' R. Amir

"MODY" Arena, Poleg Beach, Netanya
Referee: Alon Yefet, Moshe Bohbot & Meir Levi
13 July 2018
13:50

Hapoel "Millennium Terminal" Ashkelon	3 - 4 (a.e.t.)	A.F. "Claus Mashkaot" Holon
D. Tsao 12', 15', 16'	Report	9' A. Mauda; 22' Y. Machluf; 26', 38' O. Halwani

"MODY" Arena, Poleg Beach, Netanya
Referee: Meir Levi, Moshe Bohbot & Alon Yefet

== Knockout stage ==
Quarter-finals
13 July 2018
Maccabi "RE/MAX" Netanya	5
"Auto Hai" Bnei Yehuda	1
13 July 2018
Hapoel "Yahalomit Peretz/Taglit" Karmiel	5
Ironi Rosh HaAyin	3
13 July 2018
Bnei "Falfala" Kfar Qassem	3
Hapoel "Sportball" Hedera	2
13 July 2018
Beitar "Italy Gold Jewellery" Jerusalem	8
"KELME" Be'er Sheva	6

Semi-finals
27 July 2018
Maccabi "RE/MAX" Netanya	6
Beitar "Italy Gold Jewellery" Jerusalem	5
27 July 2018
Hapoel "Yahalomit Peretz/Taglit" Karmiel	3
Bnei "Falfala" Kfar Qassem	6

Final
27 July 2018
Maccabi "RE/MAX" Netanya	3
Bnei "Falfala" Kfar Qassem	2

=== Quarter-finals ===
13 July 2018
14:50

Bnei "Falfala" Kfar Qassem	3 - 2	Hapoel "Sportball" Hedera
E. Ben Menashe 23' (o.g.); A. Yatim 24'; Deiwerson 35'	Report	27' (pen.) M. Kirtava; 35' N. Mechani

"MODY" Arena, Poleg Beach, Netanya
13 July 2018
15:40

Beitar "Italy Gold Jewellery" Jerusalem	8 - 6	"KELME" Be'er Sheva
E. Sasportas 3'; S. Edri 6', 31'; S. Hayat 9', 17'; R. Amran 11' (pen.); I. Bar David 20', 21'	Report	7' Matan Cohen; 10' E. Iluz; (red card) 11' Ori Cohen; 14', 25' Reyder; 16' T. Goto; 28' F. Filipov

"MODY" Arena, Poleg Beach, Netanya
13 July 2018
16:30

Hapoel "Yahalomit Peretz/Taglit" Karmiel	5 - 3	Ironi Rosh HaAyin
A. Levi 3'; E. Tzabari 15'; N. Belchior 19'; O. Ifrah 21'; Madjer 25'	Report	18', 25' F. Costa; 23' A. Portelaa; (red card) 36' A. Farias

"MODY" Arena, Poleg Beach, Netanya
13 July 2018
17:20

Maccabi "RE/MAX" Netanya	5 - 1	"Auto Hai" Bnei Yehuda
E. Carrera 1'; E. Shick 5'; B. Briga 9'; A. Lam 21'; Domi 23'	Report	24' Joriel; (red card) 29' Kobi Cohen; (red card) 30' A. Magol

"MODY" Arena, Poleg Beach, Netanya

=== Semi-finals ===
27 July 2018
12:50

Bnei "Falfala" Kfar Qassem	6 - 3	Hapoel "Yahalomit Peretz/Taglit" Karmiel
D. da Silva 5'; Deiwerson 6'; H. Jabaren 10'; N. Sarsur 14'; A. Yatim 24', 31'		21' O. Ifrah; 24' R. Coimbra; 30' D. Halevi

"MODY" Arena, Poleg Beach, Netanya
Referee: Meir Levi, Igal Iskov & Noam Salooma
27 July 2018
13:50

Maccabi "RE/MAX" Netanya	6 - 5	Beitar "Italy Gold Jewellery" Jerusalem
K. Badash 1'; G. Eini 5'; Domi 7', 9'; E. Carrera 15'; Fran 27'		2' S. Edri; 3' I. Bar David; 8', 30' N. Cohen; 23' N. Sapir

"MODY" Arena, Poleg Beach, Netanya
Referee: Meir Levi, Igal Iskov & Noam Salooma

=== Youth Final ===
27 July 2018
14:50

Merkaz Kehilati Mizrah Netanya	4 - 3	Neot Herzel Netanya
G. David 11', 21'; Y. Israel 17'; A. Ohayon 20', pen.'		8' L. Hazut; 12', 17' N. Moris

"MODY" Arena, Poleg Beach, Netanya
Referee: Meir Levi, Igal Iskov & Noam Salooma

=== Awards ===
Winners	Top scorer		Fair Team
Merkaz Kehilati; Mizrah Netanya	Liber Hazut (Neot Herzel Netanya)	16 goals	Hapoel Pardesiya

=== Survival match ===
27 July 2018
15:30

Hapoel "Millennium Terminal" Ashkelon	2 - 4	"Roah Bakfar" Tel Aviv
D. Tsao 21', 36'		7', 28' L. Asmara; 23' L. Hai; 34' R. Peretz

"MODY" Arena, Poleg Beach, Netanya
Referee: Eli Hacmon, Moshe Bohbot & Meir Levi

=== Exhibition match ===
27 July 2018
16:30

Artists' Team	6 - 2	The Beach Stars
B. Tzabari 2', 5'; D. Ben-Haim 6', 24'; O. Nissim 18' (pen.); D. Miroshnikov 21'		12' R. Hod; 13' Liron "TilTil" Orpali

"MODY" Arena, Poleg Beach, Netanya
Referee: Eli Hacmon, Moshe Bohbot & Meir Levi

=== Final ===
27 July 2018
17:15

Maccabi "RE/MAX" Netanya	3 - 2	Bnei "Falfala" Kfar Qassem
K. Badash 22'; Fran 24' (pen.); Domi 34'	Report	11' A. Yatim; 13' Deiwerson

"MODY" Arena, Poleg Beach, Netanya
Referee: Meir Levi, Eli Hacmon & Moshe Bohbot

== Goalscorers ==
12 goals

- (Israel) Shalom Edri (Beitar "Italy Gold Jewellery" Jerusalem)
- (Israel) Elihay Tzabari (Hapoel "Yahalomit Peretz/Taglit" Karmiel)
- (Bulgaria) Filip Filipov ("KELME" Be'er Sheva)

9 goals

- (Spain) Ezequiel Carrera (Maccabi "RE/MAX" Netanya)
- (Ukraine) Oleg Zborovskyi (Bnei "Falfala" Kfar Qassem)

8 goals

- (Israel) Tzahi Ilos (Hapoel "A. Tahzokat Otobosim" Petah Tikva)
- (Israel) Daniel Tsao (Hapoel "Millennium Terminal" Ashkelon)

7 goals

- (Israel) Amer Yatim (Bnei "Falfala" Kfar Qassem)
- (Israel) Itay Bar David (Beitar "Italy Gold Jewellery" Jerusalem)
- (Israel) Lior Asmara ("Roah Bakfar" Tel Aviv)
- (Portugal) Fabio Costa (Ironi Rosh HaAyin)

6 goals

- (Israel) Kobi Badash (Maccabi "RE/MAX" Netanya)
- (Spain) Fran (Maccabi "RE/MAX" Netanya)
- (Israel) Nir Cohen (Beitar "Italy Gold Jewellery" Jerusalem)
- (Israel) Michael Kirtava (Hapoel "Sportball" Hedera)
- (Israel) Nimrod Mechani (Hapoel "Sportball" Hedera)
- (Democratic Republic of the Congo) Joriel ("Auto Hai" Bnei Yehuda)

5 goals

- (Spain) Domi (Maccabi "RE/MAX" Netanya)
- (Brazil) Deiwerson (Bnei "Falfala" Kfar Qassem)
- (Israel) Wasim Agbaria (Bnei "Falfala" Kfar Qassem)
- (Israel) Sagi Hayat (Beitar "Italy Gold Jewellery" Jerusalem)
- (Brazil) Reyder ("KELME" Be'er Sheva)
- (Japan) Takasuke Goto ("KELME" Be'er Sheva)
- (Israel) Eliran Magol ("Auto Hai" Bnei Yehuda)

== Winners ==
2018 Israeli Beach Soccer League
Winners:

Maccabi "RE/MAX" Netanya
Fourth title

== Awards ==
Best Player (MVP)
(Spain) Domi (Maccabi "RE/MAX" Netanya)
Top Scorer
(Israel) Shalom Edri (Beitar "Italy Gold Jewellery" Jerusalem)
(Israel) Elihay Tzabari (Hapoel "Yahalomit Peretz/Taglit" Karmiel)
(Bulgaria) Filip Filipov ("KELME" Be'er Sheva)
12 goals
Best Goalkeeper
(Israel) Chen Berkovic (Maccabi "RE/MAX" Netanya)

== See also ==
- Israeli Beach Soccer League
