= 2019 Israeli Beach Soccer League =

Tournament details
- Host country: Israel
- Dates: 14 June – 26 July 2019
- Teams: 12 (from 1 confederation)
- Venue(s): 1 (in 1 host city)

Final positions
- Champions: Bnei "Falfala" Kfar Qassem (5th title)
- Runners-up: Maccabi "RE/MAX" Netanya

Tournament statistics
- Matches played: 40
- Goals scored: 344 (8.6 per match)
- Top scorer(s): (Brazil) Lucao (Brazil) Bruno Xavier (11 goals each)
- Best player(s): (Brazil) Bruno Xavier

The 2019 Israeli Beach Soccer League was a national beach soccer league event that took place between 14 June and 26 July 2019, in Netanya, Israel.

Schedule of matches was published on the official Facebook page of Israeli Beach Soccer League.

== Group stage ==
All kickoff times are of local time in Netanya, Israel (UTC+02:00).

=== Group A ===
Pos	Team	Pld	W	W+	WP	L	GF	GA	GD	Pts	Qualification
1	Maccabi "RE/MAX" Netanya	5	4	0	0	1	34	15	+19	12	Clinched quarterfinal berth
2	Hapoel "Confino" Hedera	5	3	0	0	2	29	23	+6	9	Clinched quarterfinal berth
3	Hapoel "Avaz HaZahav" Be'er Sheva	5	2	1	0	2	20	16	+4	9	Clinched quarterfinal berth
4	"Auto Hai" Bnei Yehuda	5	3	0	0	2	14	18	−4	9	Clinched quarterfinal berth
5	Beitar "Milk" Ma'ale Adumim	5	0	0	1	4	12	24	−12	2	Clinched relegation playoffs
6	"Mandarin Beach Restaurant" Tel Aviv	5	1	0	0	4	14	27	−13	3	Clinched relegation playoffs

14 June 2019
13:00

"Mandarin Beach Restaurant" Tel Aviv	2–2 (a.e.t.)	Beitar "Milk" Ma'ale Adumim
A. Hakak 20'; Y. Giladi 25'	Report	8', 27' K. Badash
Penalties
L. Asmara (penalty scored); A. Hakak (penalty scored); N. Halevi (penalty scored); R. Peretz (penalty scored); I. Shaulsky (penalty missed); O. Yehezkel (penalty scored)	5–4	(penalty scored) K. Badash; (penalty scored) O. Halwani; (penalty scored) A. Marciano; (penalty scored) R. Gorshumov (penalty missed); (penalty missed) N. Asraf

"MODY" Arena, Poleg Beach, Netanya
Referee: Meir Levi, Moshe Bohbot & Liran Liany
14 June 2019
13:50

Hapoel "Confino" Hedera	5–3	"Auto Hai" Bnei Yehuda
M. Kirtava 4'; T. Ilos 12' (pen.); R. Alkoby 18'; B. Yosefi 26'; E. Elimelech 33'	Report	2' Y. Elbaz; 16' L. Nahum; 25' A. Abu Sbeet

"MODY" Arena, Poleg Beach, Netanya
Referee: Meir Levi, Liran Liany & Moshe Bohbot
14 June 2019
17:20

Maccabi "RE/MAX" Netanya	3–4	Hapoel "Avaz HaZahav" Be'er Sheva
G. Eini 3'; E. Tzabari 12', 28'	Report	1', 13', 25' F. Filipov; 24' Reyder

"MODY" Arena, Poleg Beach, Netanya
Referee: Eli Hacmon, Igal Iskov & Idan Bernstein

21 June 2019
15:40

"Mandarin Beach Restaurant" Tel Aviv	4–6	Hapoel "Confino" Hedera
A. Hakak 7'; O. Yehezkel 14'; R. R. Peretz 15'; L. Asmara 31'	Report	1', 17' (pen.) R. Alkoby; 6' B. Yosefi; 16', 24' O. Ilos; 36' T. Ilos

"MODY" Arena, Poleg Beach, Netanya
Referee: Eli Hacmon, Idan Bernstein & Roi Reinshreiber
21 June 2019
16:30

Hapoel "Avaz HaZahav" Be'er Sheva	2–3	"Auto Hai" Bnei Yehuda
E. Iluz 5'; Reyder 26'	Report	14', 18' E. Magol; 19' A. Abu Sbeet

"MODY" Arena, Poleg Beach, Netanya
Referee: Eli Hacmon, Roi Reinshreiber & Idan Bernstein
21 June 2019
17:20

Beitar "Milk" Ma'ale Adumim	3–11	Maccabi "RE/MAX" Netanya
K. Badash 6'; N. Asraf 25', 27'	Report	2' E. Tzabari; 5', 13' (pen.), 23', 24' Lucao; 10', 34' A. Levi; 11', 12' Rafinha; 14', 29' B. Briga

"MODY" Arena, Poleg Beach, Netanya
Referee: Eli Hacmon, Roi Reinshreiber & Idan Bernstein

28 June 2019
13:00

Hapoel "Confino" Hedera	5–6 (a.e.t.)	Hapoel "Avaz HaZahav" Be'er Sheva
R. Alkoby 1'; T. Ilos 11'; M. Kirtava 14', 21' (pen.); B. Yosefi 16'	Report	11' E. Ben Menashe; 10', 19' F. Filipov; 22', 38' Reyder; 36' A. Atia

"MODY" Arena, Poleg Beach, Netanya
Referee: Liran Liany, Idan Bernstein & Igal Iskov
28 June 2019
15:40

"Auto Hai" Bnei Yehuda	2–1	Beitar "Milk" Ma'ale Adumim
A. Abu Sbeet 24'; E. Magol 37'	Report	7' A. Marciano

"MODY" Arena, Poleg Beach, Netanya
Referee: Meir Levi & Moshe Bohbot
28 June 2019
17:20

Maccabi "RE/MAX" Netanya	7–2	"Mandarin Beach Restaurant" Tel Aviv
A. Levi 4'; Antonio 18', 25', 34' (pen.); Rafinha 19'; G. Eini 28', 31'	Report	10', 31' N. Hen; (yellow card) 3' (yellow-red card) 19' O. Yehezkel

"MODY" Arena, Poleg Beach, Netanya
Referee: Meir Levi & Moshe Bohbot

5 July 2019
13:50

"Auto Hai" Bnei Yehuda	2–7	Maccabi "RE/MAX" Netanya
Y. Elbaz 8'; E. Magol 32'		1', 33' A. Levi; 3' Rafinha; 11', 18' E. Tzabari; 28' A. Lam; 32' G. Eini

"MODY" Arena, Poleg Beach, Netanya
Referee: Idan Bernstein, Roi Reinshreiber & Noam Salooma
5 July 2019
14:40

Hapoel "Avaz HaZahav" Be'er Sheva	5–1	"Mandarin Beach Restaurant" Tel Aviv
Reyder 2', 5'; E. Iluz 7'; A. Atia 20'; E. Caro 21'		9' L. Asmara

"MODY" Arena, Poleg Beach, Netanya
Referee: Eli Hacmon, Liran Liany & Igal Iskov
5 July 2019
16:20

Beitar "Milk" Ma'ale Adumim	4–9	Hapoel "Confino" Hedera
E. Shashe 18'; K. Badash 23'; Y. Hatuka 25'; D. Mnsirov 36'		8', 25' A. Ventura; 11' D. Maradona; 13' M. Kirtava; 15', 21' O. Ilos; 24' T. Ilos; 29' B. Alsbri; 30' B. Yosefi

"MODY" Arena, Poleg Beach, Netanya
Referee: Eli Hacmon, Liran Liany & Igal Iskov

12 July 2019
13:00

"Mandarin Beach Restaurant" Tel Aviv	3–4	"Auto Hai" Bnei Yehuda
O. Yehezkel 5', 19'; N. Hepzedi 23'		1' A. Magol; 2' K. Cohen; 7', 36' E. Magol

"MODY" Arena, Poleg Beach, Netanya
Referee: Eli Hacmon, Roi Reinshreiber & Idan Bernstein
12 July 2019
13:50

Hapoel "Avaz HaZahav" Be'er Sheva	3–4	Beitar "Milk" Ma'ale Adumim
Reyder 15'; Y. Benisho 29'; E. Ben Menashe 33'		7' K. Badash; 17', 23' Dieginio; 28' Y. Hatuka

"MODY" Arena, Poleg Beach, Netanya
Referee: Roi Reinshreiber, Eli Hacmon & Idan Bernstein
12 July 2019
17:20

Maccabi "RE/MAX" Netanya	6–4	Hapoel "Confino" Hedera
Rafinha 12'; A. Lam 13'; O. Halevi 16'; Lucao 16'; G. Eini 19'; A. Levi 23'		27' R. Alkoby; 28' M. Kirtava; 33' (o.g.) G. Eini; 36' O. Ilos

"MODY" Arena, Poleg Beach, Netanya
Referee: Meir Levi, Omer Barbiro & Liran Liany

=== Group B ===
Pos	Team	Pld	W	W+	WP	L	GF	GA	GD	Pts	Qualification
1	Bnei "Falfala" Kfar Qassem	5	4	0	1	0	31	17	+14	14	Clinched quarterfinal berth
2	Hapoel "Sarfati Shimon" Ashkelon	5	2	0	2	1	22	18	+4	10	Clinched quarterfinal berth
3	Ironi Rosh HaAyin	5	3	0	0	2	24	16	+8	9	Clinched quarterfinal berth
4	Hapoel "Yilmazlar" Holon	5	2	0	0	3	23	22	+1	6	Clinched quarterfinal berth
5	Beitar "Tofes Yashir" Jerusalem	5	1	0	0	4	18	30	−12	3	Clinched relegation playoffs
6	Hapoel "Zer Itzhak VeBanav" Karmiel	5	0	0	0	5	13	28	−15	0	Clinched relegation playoffs

14 June 2019
14:50

Hapoel "Sarfati Shimon" Ashkelon	5–4	Hapoel "Yilmazlar" Holon
E. Shemesh 5', 20'; M. Kalfa (red card) 15'; A. Malca 24', 25'; Edson 24'	Report	7' Miguel Jr. 9' L. Ben Ari; 28' F. Antonio; 36' A. Zvulun

"MODY" Arena, Poleg Beach, Netanya
Referee: Liran Liany, Moshe Bohbot & Meir Levi
14 June 2019
15:40

Ironi Rosh HaAyin	6–1	Hapoel "Zer Itzhak VeBanav" Karmiel
Benjamin Jr. 4', 14', 28'; G. Novaes 16'; B. Maimoni 20' (o.g.); S. Gormezano 25'	Report	33' T. Atrash

"MODY" Arena, Poleg Beach, Netanya
Referee: Eli Hacmon, Idan Bernstein & Igal Iskov
14 June 2019
16:30

Bnei "Falfala" Kfar Qassem	10–3	Beitar "Tofes Yashir" Jerusalem
H. Jabaren 2', 12', 36'; Bokinha 9'; S. Moreb 11'; A. Sarsur 16'; Moad Amer 22'; A. Yatim 24'; Bruno Xavier 31'; W. Agbaria 35'	Report	9' N. Sapir; 20' B. Shem Tov; 21' N. Revivo

"MODY" Arena, Poleg Beach, Netanya
Referee: Eli Hacmon, Idan Bernstein & Igal Iskov

21 June 2019
13:00

Hapoel "Zer Itzhak VeBanav" Karmiel	3–5	Beitar "Tofes Yashir" Jerusalem
A. Mayer 1', 29'; A. Milad 8'	Report	10', 21' B. Shem Tov; 25', 26' N. Revivo; 36' N. Cohen

"MODY" Arena, Poleg Beach, Netanya
21 June 2019
13:50

Hapoel "Sarfati Shimon" Ashkelon	3–3 (a.e.t.)	Ironi Rosh HaAyin
Edson 7'; D. Tsao 32'; O. Cohen 36'	Report	18' A. Danin; 19', 34' N. Mechani
Penalties
Edson (penalty scored)	1–0	(penalty missed) G. Novaes

"MODY" Arena, Poleg Beach, Netanya
Referee: Moshe Bohbot, Meir Levi & Liran Liany
21 June 2019
14:50

Hapoel "Yilmazlar" Holon	3–5	Bnei "Falfala" Kfar Qassem
Y. Machluf 14'; N. Bella 20'; Miguel Jr. 28' (pen.)	Report	10' H. Jabaren; 12', 33' S. Moreb; 19' A. Yatim; 25' Bruno Xavier

"MODY" Arena, Poleg Beach, Netanya
Referee: Liran Liany, Moshe Bohbot & Meir Levi

28 June 2019
13:50

Bnei "Falfala" Kfar Qassem	6–2	Hapoel "Zer Itzhak VeBanav" Karmiel
A. Yatim 1'; Bruno Xavier 13'; N. Sarsur 14'; S. Moreb 16'; F. da Silva 24'; Bokinha 27'	Report	16' A. Milad; 17' A. Mayer

"MODY" Arena, Poleg Beach, Netanya
Referee: Liran Liany, Idan Bernstein & Igal Iskov
28 June 2019
14:50

Beitar "Tofes Yashir" Jerusalem	3–3 (a.e.t.)	Hapoel "Sarfati Shimon" Ashkelon
Y. Shina 22'; N. Revivo 29', 32'	Report	16' Dunga; 27' A. Bhonker; 32' Edson
Penalties
S. Hayat (penalty missed)	0–1	(penalty scored) Edson

"MODY" Arena, Poleg Beach, Netanya
Referee: Liran Liany, Igal Iskov & Idan Bernstein
28 June 2019
16:30

Ironi Rosh HaAyin	5–3	Hapoel "Yilmazlar" Holon
Benjamin Jr. 1', 34'; E. Levy 15'; Paulinho 24', 36'; I. Trabelsi (yellow card) 31' (yellow-red card) 31'	Report	3' Miguel Jr. 26' N. Bella; 31' (pen.) L. Ben Ari

"MODY" Arena, Poleg Beach, Netanya
Referee: Meir Levi & Moshe Bohbot

5 July 2019
12:10

Hapoel "Sarfati Shimon" Ashkelon	4–4 (a.e.t.)	Bnei "Falfala" Kfar Qassem
Edson 5', 11', 22', (yellow card) 7' (yellow-red card) 32'; M. Kalfa 24'; K. Swissa (red card) 32'		18' Moad Amer; 20' F. da Silva; 29', 31' A. Yatim
Penalties
Dunga (penalty scored); A. Malca (penalty scored); E. Shemesh (penalty scored); Everton (penalty scored); O. Cohen (penalty scored); N. Hgani (penalty missed)	5–6	(penalty scored) Bokinha; (penalty scored) A. Yatim; (penalty scored) W. Agbaria; (penalty scored) N. Sarsur; (penalty scored) S. Moreb; (penalty scored) A. Sarsur

"MODY" Arena, Poleg Beach, Netanya
Referee: Roi Reinshreiber, Idan Bernstein & Noam Salooma
5 July 2019
13:00

Beitar "Tofes Yashir" Jerusalem	3–5	Ironi Rosh HaAyin
B. Shem Tov 13', 33'; N. Cohen 21'		3', 29' E. Levy; 12' Paulinho; 25' Benjamin Jr. 30' N. Mechani

"MODY" Arena, Poleg Beach, Netanya
Referee: Roi Reinshreiber, Idan Bernstein & Noam Salooma
5 July 2019
15:30

Hapoel "Yilmazlar" Holon	4–3	Hapoel "Zer Itzhak VeBanav" Karmiel
Miguel Jr. 5' (pen.); F. Antonio 14'; N. Bella 21', 36'		5' O. Ifrah; 12', 19' Ricardinho

"MODY" Arena, Poleg Beach, Netanya
Referee: Eli Hacmon, Liran Liany & Igal Iskov

12 July 2019
14:50

Hapoel "Zer Itzhak VeBanav" Karmiel	4–7	Hapoel "Sarfati Shimon" Ashkelon
N. Zarka 4'; A. Mayer 16'; 23'; T. Atrash 32'		4', 5', 12' Heverton; 13' E. Shemesh; 22' A. Bhonker; 28' N. Hgani; 35' Y. Ofri

"MODY" Arena, Poleg Beach, Netanya
Referee: Eli Hacmon, Idan Bernstein & Roi Reinshreiber
12 July 2019
15:40

Hapoel "Yilmazlar" Holon	9–4	Beitar "Tofes Yashir" Jerusalem
Miguel Jr. 9' (pen.), 12', 27'; D. Azulay 16'; N. Bella 24', 33'; Y. Machluf 31'; F. Antonio 35'; A. Mauda 36'		1', 3', 5' B. Shem Tov; 24' Y. Shina

"MODY" Arena, Poleg Beach, Netanya
Referee: Meir Levi, Liran Liany & Omer Barbiro
12 July 2019
16:30

Bnei "Falfala" Kfar Qassem	6–5	Ironi Rosh HaAyin
F. da Silva 9', 30', 35', 36'; Bokinha 12'; A. Yatim 14'		9', 34' Paulinho; 18' D. Halevi; 22' S. Gormezano; 23', (red card) 36' E. Levy

"MODY" Arena, Poleg Beach, Netanya
Referee: Meir Levi, Liran Liany & Omer Barbiro

== Relegation playoffs (Loser on Final is relegated) ==
Semi-finals
19 July 2019
Beitar "Milk" Ma'ale Adumim (p)	6 (2)
Hapoel "Zer Itzhak VeBanav" Karmiel	6 (1)
19 July 2019
"Mandarin Beach Restaurant" Tel Aviv	2 (0)
Beitar "Tofes Yashir" Jerusalem (p)	2 (1)

Final
26 July 2019
Hapoel "Zer Itzhak VeBanav" Karmiel	7
"Mandarin Beach Restaurant" Tel Aviv	2

=== Relegation playoffs ===
19 July 2019
13:00

Beitar "Milk" Ma'ale Adumim	6–6 (a.e.t.)	Hapoel "Zer Itzhak VeBanav" Karmiel
D. Mnsirov 15'; K. Badash 15' (22); Y. Hatuka 24', 32'; Dieginio 25'	Report	4', 10', 32' S. Rotman; 14' Eliott; 20' O. Ifrah; 33' A. Mayer
Penalties
Dieginio (penalty scored); K. Badash (penalty scored)	2–1	(penalty scored) Eliott; (penalty missed) O. Ifrah

"MODY" Arena, Poleg Beach, Netanya
Referee: Meir Levi, Moshe Bohbot & Roi Reinshreiber
19 July 2019
13:50

"Mandarin Beach Restaurant" Tel Aviv	2–2 (a.e.t.)	Beitar "Tofes Yashir" Jerusalem
L. Asmara 16'; T. Gordana 21'	Report	4' N. Revivo; 11' (pen.) B. Shem Tov
Penalties
A. Shemesh (penalty missed)	0–1	(penalty scored) B. Shem Tov

"MODY" Arena, Poleg Beach, Netanya
Referee: Meir Levi, Roi Reinshreiber & Moshe Bohbot

== Knockout stage ==
Quarter-finals
19 July 2019
Maccabi "RE/MAX" Netanya (p)	5 (1)
Hapoel "Yilmazlar" Holon	5 (0)
19 July 2019
Hapoel "Sarfati Shimon" Ashkelon	7
Hapoel "Avaz HaZahav" Be'er Sheva	3
19 July 2019
Hapoel "Confino" Hedera	4
Ironi Rosh HaAyin	3
19 July 2019
Bnei "Falfala" Kfar Qassem	9
"Auto Hai" Bnei Yehuda	5

Semi-finals
26 July 2019
Maccabi "RE/MAX" Netanya	7
Hapoel "Sarfati Shimon" Ashkelon	4
26 July 2019
Hapoel "Confino" Hedera	1
Bnei "Falfala" Kfar Qassem	6

Final
26 July 2019
Maccabi "RE/MAX" Netanya	5 (0)
Bnei "Falfala" Kfar Qassem (p)	5 (1)

=== Exhibition match ===
5 July 2019
17:20

Israel	1–6	Brazil National Stars
T. Ilos 34'		7' Bokinha; 14' F. da Silva; 17' Antonio; 27' Rafinha; 30', 32' Lucao

"MODY" Arena, Poleg Beach, Netanya
Attendance: 2,000
Referee: Eli Hacmon & Liran Liany

=== Details ===
Israel

Brazil National Stars

GK	18	Abdel Rahim Sarsur
DF	4	Alon Levi
MF	10	Amer Yatim
FW	11	Elihay Tzabari
MF	12	Sameh Moreb
Substitutes:
GK	1	Assaf Raz
MF	2	Or Ilos
GK	3	Guy Salem
FW	5	Muhammad "Noor" Sarsur
DF	6	Yakir Shina
MF	7	Adir Danin
MF	8	Liron Fartook
FW	9	Tzahi Ilos (c)
FW	13	Sharon Gormezano
MF	17	Nisan Revivo
Manager:
Mamon Amer
Assistant Manager:
Liron Fartook

GK	1	Rafа Padilha
DF	5	Filipe da Silva
FW	7	Bokinha
FW	9	Benjamin Junior
MF	10	Benjamin (c)
Substitutes:
DF	3	Antonio
DF	4	Anderson
FW	6	Lucao
MF	8	Rafinha
FW	11	Fred

=== Quarter-finals ===
19 July 2019
14:50

Bnei "Falfala" Kfar Qassem	9–5	"Auto Hai" Bnei Yehuda
A. Yatim 5', 7'; Bokinha 9'; F. da Silva 15'; Bruno Xavier 18', 24'; H. Jabaren 19'; Moad Amer 33'; K. Cohen 34' (o.g.)	Report	8', 32' R. Perez; 10', 36' (pen.) A. Abu Sbeet; 14' N. Peretz

"MODY" Arena, Poleg Beach, Netanya
Referee: Roi Reinshreiber, Moshe Bohbot & Meir Levi

19 July 2019
15:40

Hapoel "Sarfati Shimon" Ashkelon	7–3	Hapoel "Avaz HaZahav" Be'er Sheva
O. Cohen 4'; A. Bhonker 6'; Edson 19', 26'; N. Hgani 21'; E. Shemesh 34', 35'	Report	21' F. Filipov; 32' Y. Benisho; 34' Reyder

"MODY" Arena, Poleg Beach, Netanya
Referee: Igal Iskov

19 July 2019
16:30

Hapoel "Confino" Hedera	4–3	Ironi Rosh HaAyin
S. Hananayev 5'; M. Kirtava 7' (pen.), 27'; T. Ilos 31'; D. Maradona (yellow card) 34' (yellow-red card) 34'	Report	6', 20' Paulinho; 19' G. Novaes

"MODY" Arena, Poleg Beach, Netanya
Referee: Meir Levi & Moshe Bohbot

19 July 2019
17:20

Maccabi "RE/MAX" Netanya	5–5 (a.e.t.)	Hapoel "Yilmazlar" Holon
Antonio 13'; E. Tzabari 16'; Lucao 20', 24'; O. Halevi 25'	Report	15', 36' Miguel Jr. 16' F. Antonio; 18' Y. Machluf; 21' N. Bella
Penalties
Lucao (penalty scored)	1–0	(penalty missed) N. Bella

"MODY" Arena, Poleg Beach, Netanya
Referee: Meir Levi & Moshe Bohbot

=== Semi-finals ===
26 July 2019
12:50

Maccabi "RE/MAX" Netanya	7–4	Hapoel "Sarfati Shimon" Ashkelon
Lucao 4', 20', 31'; A. Levi 6'; E. Tzabari 9', 33'; O. Halevi 28'	Report	8', 16' A. Malca; 10' Heverton; 35' A. Yakobi

"MODY" Arena, Poleg Beach, Netanya
Referee: Meir Levi, Or Lugasi & Noam Salooma

26 July 2019
13:50

Hapoel "Confino" Hedera	1–6	Bnei "Falfala" Kfar Qassem
T. Ilos 4'; R. Alkoby (red card) 36'; B. Alsbri (red card) 36'	Report	1', 9', 31', 34' Bruno Xavier; 23', 36' F. da Silva

"MODY" Arena, Poleg Beach, Netanya
Referee: Meir Levi, Or Lugasi & Noam Salooma

=== Youth Final ===
26 July 2019
14:50

Hapoel Qalansawe	3–3 (a.e.t.)	"City Center" Netanya
M. Masarwa 3', 13', 19'		7', 23' R. Udi; 14' Y. Robin
Penalties
M. Masarwa (penalty scored)	1–0	(penalty missed) R. Udi

"MODY" Arena, Poleg Beach, Netanya
Referee: Meir Levi, Noam Salooma & Or Lugasi

=== Awards ===
Winners	Top scorer	
Hapoel Qalansawe	Mustafa Masarwa (Hapoel Qalansawe)	10 goals

=== Survival match ===
26 July 2019
15:30

Hapoel "Zer Itzhak VeBanav" Karmiel	7–2	"Mandarin Beach Restaurant" Tel Aviv
O. Ifrah 4', 35'; D. Chikashvili 13'; T. Shriki 24', 29'; A. Mayer 36'; A. Milad 36'		9' O. Yehezkel; 27', (red card) 36' Y. Giladi

"MODY" Arena, Poleg Beach, Netanya
Referee: Eli Hacmon

=== Exhibition match ===
26 July 2019
16:30

Goalstar Brazil's Stars	5–4	Artists' Team for the Community
D. Revivo 2', 7'; E. Golan 6' (pen.), 14'; A. Ram 13'	Report	7' D. Ben-Haim; 15', 21' O. Cohen; 24' N. Danin

"MODY" Arena, Poleg Beach, Netanya
Referee: Eli Hacmon & Liran Liany

=== Final ===
26 July 2019
17:15

Maccabi "RE/MAX" Netanya	5–5 (a.e.t.)	Bnei "Falfala" Kfar Qassem
Rafinha 3'; A. Levi 4', 17'; O. Halevi (yellow card) 12' (yellow-red card) 18'; Antonio 26'; Lucao 32'		18' S. Moreb; 24' F. da Silva; 34', 36' Bruno Xavier; 36' Bokinha
Penalties
Lucao (penalty missed)	0–1	(penalty scored) Bruno Xavier

"MODY" Arena, Poleg Beach, Netanya
Attendance: 2,000
Referee: Eli Hacmon, Liran Liany & Igal Iskov

== Goalscorers ==
Players who scored at least 7 goals

11 goals

- (Brazil) Lucao (Maccabi "RE/MAX" Netanya)
- (Brazil) Bruno Xavier (Bnei "Falfala" Kfar Qassem)

10 goals

- (Brazil) Filipe da Silva (Bnei "Falfala" Kfar Qassem)

9 goals

- (Israel) Alon Levi (Maccabi "RE/MAX" Netanya)
- (Brazil) Miguel Jr. (Hapoel "Yilmazlar" Holon)
- (Israel) Bar Shem Tov (Beitar "Tofes Yashir" Jerusalem)

8 goals

- (Israel) Amer Yatim (Bnei "Falfala" Kfar Qassem)
- (Israel) Elihay Tzabari (Maccabi "RE/MAX" Netanya)
- (Brazil) Edson (Hapoel "Sarfati Shimon" Ashkelon)
- (Brazil) Reyder (Hapoel "Avaz HaZahav" Be'er Sheva)

7 goals

- (Israel) Michael Kirtava (Hapoel "Confino" Hedera)
- (Uruguay) Nicolas Bella (Hapoel "Yilmazlar" Holon)
- (Brazil) Paulinho (Ironi Rosh HaAyin)
- (Israel) Kobi Badash (Beitar "Milk" Ma'ale Adumim)

== Winners ==
2019 Israeli Beach Soccer League
Winners:

Kfar Qassem BS Club (beach soccer)
Fifth title

== Awards ==
Best Player (MVP)
(Brazil) Bruno Xavier (Bnei "Falfala" Kfar Qassem)
Top Scorer
(Brazil) Lucao (Maccabi "RE/MAX" Netanya) (Note: Although Lucao shared the top scorer trophy with Bruno Xavier, it was decided to award this trophy to Lucao only.)
(Brazil) Bruno Xavier (Bnei "Falfala" Kfar Qassem)
11 goals

== See also ==
- Israeli Beach Soccer League
