= 2013 Israeli Beach Soccer League =

Tournament details
- Host country: Israel
- Dates: 31 May – 26 July 2013
- Teams: 10 (from 1 confederation)
- Venue(s): 1 (in 1 host city)

Final positions
- Champions: (Israel) Bnei "Falfala" Kfar Qassem (2nd title)
- Runners-up: (Israel) Maccabi "Doron Motors" Netanya

Tournament statistics
- Matches played: 28
- Goals scored: 201 (7.18 per match)
- Top scorer(s): (Brazil) Dino ( (Israel) Bnei "Falfala" Kfar Qassem) (15 goals)
- Best player(s): (Brazil) Dino

The 2013 Israeli Beach Soccer League was a national beach soccer league that took place between 31 May and 26 July 2013, in Netanya, Israel.

== Group stage ==
All kickoff times are of local time in Netanya, Israel (UTC+02:00).

=== Group A ===
Pos	Team	Pld	W	W+	WP	L	GF	GA	GD	Pts	Qualification
1	Bnei "Falfala" Kfar Qassem	4	3	0	0	1	18	10	+8	9	Clinched quarterfinal berth
2	Maccabi "Doron Motors" Netanya	4	2	0	1	1	21	18	+3	8	Clinched quarterfinal berth
3	Maccabi "Ido Keren" Haifa	4	1	1	0	2	16	19	−3	6	Clinched quarterfinal berth
4	Maccabi "Glidot Andrey" Kabilio Jaffa	4	1	0	0	3	11	13	−2	3	Clinched quarterfinal berth
5	Hapoel "Cinema City" Hedera	4	1	0	0	3	13	19	−6	3	Clinched relegation playoffs

31 May 2013
14:30

Maccabi "Ido Keren" Haifa	4 – 3 (a.e.t.)	Maccabi "Glidot Andrey" Kabilio Jaffa
I. Bar David 13'; M. Baraness 16', 39'; S. Hayat 20'	Report	23' Almog Buzaglo; 26' O. Pahima; 28' Asi Buzaglo

"Arena Ido Keren" Stadium, Poleg Beach, Netanya
31 May 2013
17:05

Maccabi "Doron Motors" Netanya	4 – 4 (a.e.t.)	Bnei "Falfala" Kfar Qassem
A. Danin 2', 30'; K. Badash 25', 36'	Report	1' A. Yatim; 19' R. Badir; 26' Dino; 29' M. Sarsur
Penalties
T. Ilos (penalty scored)	1 – 0	(penalty missed) A. Yatim

"Arena Ido Keren" Stadium, Poleg Beach, Netanya

7 June 2013
15:20

Hapoel "Cinema City" Hedera	3 – 5	Bnei "Falfala" Kfar Qassem
E. Levy 2', 13', 16'	Report	11' S. Moreb; 15', 34', 35' Dino; 23' Adam Sarsur

"Arena Ido Keren" Stadium, Poleg Beach, Netanya
7 June 2013
17:05

Maccabi "Glidot Andrey" Kabilio Jaffa	3 – 4	Maccabi "Doron Motors" Netanya
Almog Buzaglo 7', 36'; O. Pahima 12'	Report	11' Dieginio; 13', 34' T. Ilos; 28' A. Danin

"Arena Ido Keren" Stadium, Poleg Beach, Netanya

21 June 2013
16:10

Bnei "Falfala" Kfar Qassem	5 – 1	Maccabi "Ido Keren" Haifa
D. da Silva 19'; Dino 23', 36'; M. Sarsur 25', 30'	Report	10' M. Baraness

"Arena Ido Keren" Stadium, Poleg Beach, Netanya
21 June 2013
17:05

Maccabi "Doron Motors" Netanya	5 – 6	Hapoel "Cinema City" Hedera
T. Ilos 5', 19'; A. Danin 10'; K. Badash 28'; Dieginio 30'	Report	1', 5', 8' E. Levy; 9', 11', 24' M. Kirtava

"Arena Ido Keren" Stadium, Poleg Beach, Netanya

28 June 2013
14:30

Maccabi "Glidot Andrey" Kabilio Jaffa	3 – 1	Hapoel "Cinema City" Hedera
T. Four 1', 36'; O. Pahima 20'	Report	11' E. Levy

"Arena Ido Keren" Stadium, Poleg Beach, Netanya
28 June 2013
17:05

Maccabi "Ido Keren" Haifa	5 – 8	Maccabi "Doron Motors" Netanya
N. Revivo 7'; R. Glik 19'; M. Baraness 27', 28'; I. Bar David 36'	Report	9' L. Fartook; 12', 31' Dieginio; 16', 18' K. Badash; 21', 32' T. Ilos; 22' A. Danin

"Arena Ido Keren" Stadium, Poleg Beach, Netanya

5 July 2013
16:10

Bnei "Falfala" Kfar Qassem	4 – 2	Maccabi "Glidot Andrey" Kabilio Jaffa
Dino 16', 35'; S. Moreb 31'; M. Sarsur 33'	Report	23' T. Four; 26' O. Pahima

"Arena Ido Keren" Stadium, Poleg Beach, Netanya
5 July 2013
17:05

Maccabi "Ido Keren" Haifa	6 – 3	Hapoel "Cinema City" Hedera
N. Revivo 3', 35', 36'; I. Bar David 7'; M. Baraness 17', 26'	Report	6' A. Ben-Muha; 32', 33' M. Kirtava

"Arena Ido Keren" Stadium, Poleg Beach, Netanya

=== Group B ===
Pos	Team	Pld	W	W+	WP	L	GF	GA	GD	Pts	Qualification
1	Ironi "Aloni Haft" Rosh HaAyin	4	3	0	0	1	17	7	+10	9	Clinched quarterfinal berth
2	Ironi "Deal Tov" Petah Tikva	4	2	0	0	2	13	12	+1	6	Clinched quarterfinal berth
3	"Kidmat Eden" Kfar Saba	4	2	0	0	2	16	18	−2	6	Clinched quarterfinal berth
4	Beitar "Shava Shava" Jerusalem	4	2	0	0	2	10	14	−4	6	Clinched quarterfinal berth
5	"A.M.I. Yakutiel" Tel Aviv	4	1	0	0	3	14	19	−5	3	Clinched relegation playoffs

31 May 2013
15:20

"A.M.I. Yakutiel" Tel Aviv	5 – 7	"Kidmat Eden" Kfar Saba
T. Goto 16', 22', 25', 36'; E. Magol 29'	Report	4', 33', 34' K. Malul; 8' E. Cohen; 12' O. Rotem; 19' O. Zabag; 24' Y. Abutbul

"Arena Ido Keren" Stadium, Poleg Beach, Netanya
31 May 2013
16:10

Ironi "Aloni Haft" Rosh HaAyin	4 – 0	Ironi "Deal Tov" Petah Tikva
V. Ganon 6'; S. Gormezano 12'; M. Silva 27', 29'	Report

"Arena Ido Keren" Stadium, Poleg Beach, Netanya

7 June 2013
14:30

"Kidmat Eden" Kfar Saba	5 – 3	Beitar "Shava Shava" Jerusalem
Y. Abutbul 2', 24', 28'; Y. Simhon 6'; K. Malul 24'	Report	3' M. Amar; 7' D. Azulay; 19' Y. Hatuka

"Arena Ido Keren" Stadium, Poleg Beach, Netanya
7 June 2013
16:10

"A.M.I. Yakutiel" Tel Aviv	3 – 6	Ironi "Aloni Haft" Rosh HaAyin
E. Magol 11'; T. Goto 26'; R. Amran 35'	Report	5', 12', 29', 30' W. Agbaria; 24' S. Gormezano; 36' M. Silva

"Arena Ido Keren" Stadium, Poleg Beach, Netanya

21 June 2013
14:30

Ironi "Deal Tov" Petah Tikva	3 – 4	"A.M.I. Yakutiel" Tel Aviv
E. Sasportas 6'; O. Halwani 17'; L. Ben Ari 23'	Report	21' D. Maradona; 26', 28', 36' T. Goto

"Arena Ido Keren" Stadium, Poleg Beach, Netanya
21 June 2013
15:20

Ironi "Aloni Haft" Rosh HaAyin	2 – 3	Beitar "Shava Shava" Jerusalem
S. Gormezano 1'; W. Agbaria 8'	Report	21' S. Nagar; 28' D. Azulay; 30' A. Mauda

"Arena Ido Keren" Stadium, Poleg Beach, Netanya

28 June 2013
15:20

Ironi "Deal Tov" Petah Tikva	5 – 1	Beitar "Shava Shava" Jerusalem
G. Sharvit 6'; R. Elgarbli 11'; L. Ben Ari 24'; D. Gomez 25'; N. Sapir 34'	Report	16' M. Amar

"Arena Ido Keren" Stadium, Poleg Beach, Netanya
28 June 2013
16:10

Ironi "Aloni Haft" Rosh HaAyin	5 – 1	"Kidmat Eden" Kfar Saba
M. Silva 5', 35'; R. Mesika 10'; S. Gormezano 12'; V. Ganon 17'	Report	18' K. Malul

"Arena Ido Keren" Stadium, Poleg Beach, Netanya

5 July 2013
14:30

Beitar "Shava Shava" Jerusalem	3 – 2	"A.M.I. Yakutiel" Tel Aviv
Y. Hatuka 3'; S. Nagar 32'; A. Mauda 36'	Report	18' A. Cohen; 36' T. Goto

"Arena Ido Keren" Stadium, Poleg Beach, Netanya
5 July 2013
15:20

"Kidmat Eden" Kfar Saba	3 – 5	Ironi "Deal Tov" Petah Tikva
A. Ben Ami 3'; A. Tal 24'; K. Malul 26'	Report	4', 6' E. Sasportas; 22' D. Gomez; 25' L. Ben Ari; 28' R. Elgarbli

"Arena Ido Keren" Stadium, Poleg Beach, Netanya

== Knockout stage ==
Quarter-finals
19 July 2013
Maccabi "Glidot Andrey" Kabilio Jaffa	1
Ironi "Aloni Haft" Rosh HaAyin	4
19 July 2013
Maccabi "Ido Keren" Haifa	6
Ironi "Deal Tov" Petah Tikva	2
19 July 2013
Bnei "Falfala" Kfar Qassem	4
Beitar "Shava Shava" Jerusalem	1
19 July 2013
Maccabi "Doron Motors" Netanya	2
"Kidmat Eden" Kfar Saba	1

Semi-finals
26 July 2013
Bnei "Falfala" Kfar Qassem	4
Maccabi "Ido Keren" Haifa	3
26 July 2013
Maccabi "Doron Motors" Netanya (p)	4 (2)
Ironi "Aloni Haft" Rosh HaAyin	4 (1)

Final
26 July 2013
Maccabi "Doron Motors" Netanya	3
Bnei "Falfala" Kfar Qassem	5

=== Quarter-finals ===
19 July 2013
14:30

Maccabi "Glidot Andrey" Kabilio Jaffa	1 - 4	Ironi "Aloni Haft" Rosh HaAyin
A. Soldacho 21'	Report	12', 24' S. Gormezano; 17' V. Ganon; 25' M. Silva

"Arena Ido Keren" Stadium, Poleg Beach, Netanya

19 July 2013
15:20

Maccabi "Ido Keren" Haifa	6 - 2	Ironi "Deal Tov" Petah Tikva
I. Bar David 14', 27', 35'; R. Glik 20'; N. Cohen 24', 34'	Report	21' G. Sharvit; 30' O. Halwani

"Arena Ido Keren" Stadium, Poleg Beach, Netanya

19 July 2013
17:05

Bnei "Falfala" Kfar Qassem	4 - 1	Beitar "Shava Shava" Jerusalem
Dino 11', 25'; A. Abo Salook 20', 36'	Report	20' A. Gobeza

"Arena Ido Keren" Stadium, Poleg Beach, Netanya

19 July 2013
18:10

Maccabi "Doron Motors" Netanya	2 - 1	"Kidmat Eden" Kfar Saba
K. Badash 17'; Dieginio 35'	Report	6' K. Malul

"Arena Ido Keren" Stadium, Poleg Beach, Netanya

=== Semi-finals ===
26 July 2013
14:00

Maccabi "Doron Motors" Netanya	4 - 4 (a.e.t.)	Ironi "Aloni Haft" Rosh HaAyin
L. Fartook 9'; Dieginio 16', 18', 25'	Report	6', 19' S. Gormezano; 14', 15' M. Silva
Penalties
T. Ilos (penalty scored); K. Badash (penalty scored)	2 - 1	(penalty scored) M. Silva; (penalty missed) S. Gormezano

"Arena Ido Keren" Stadium, Poleg Beach, Netanya

26 July 2013
14:50

Bnei "Falfala" Kfar Qassem	4 - 3	Maccabi "Ido Keren" Haifa
Dino 3', 6'; D. da Silva 16'; S. Moreb 29'	Report	14', 27' R. Glik; 25' N. Revivo

"Arena Ido Keren" Stadium, Poleg Beach, Netanya

=== Relegation playoffs ===
26 July 2013
15:40

Hapoel "Cinema City" Hedera	3 - 5	"A.M.I. Yakutiel" Tel Aviv
A. Ben-Muha 22', 36'; M. Kirtava 24'	Report	4', 18' T. Goto; 8' A. Cohen; 12' R. Amran; 24' (o.g.) S. Maymon

"Arena Ido Keren" Stadium, Poleg Beach, Netanya

=== Exhibition match ===
26 July 2013
16:40

Kfar Saba Celebs	5 - 5	Sport Channel
L. Basis 1', 23'; E. Golan 4'; S. Michaelshwilli 7'; P. Hadad 10'	Report	8', 13 pen', 16' P. Balili; 12' I. Zohar; 17' Y. Benayoun
Penalties
S. Michaelshwilli (penalty missed)	0 - 2	(penalty scored) P. Balili; (penalty scored) I. Zohar

"Arena Ido Keren" Stadium, Poleg Beach, Netanya

=== Final ===
26 July 2013
17:30

Maccabi "Doron Motors" Netanya	3 - 5	Bnei "Falfala" Kfar Qassem
A. Lam 14'; Dieginio 16'; T. Ilos 32'	Report	15', 27', 29' Dino; 33' S. Moreb; 36' N. Sarsur

"Arena Ido Keren" Stadium, Poleg Beach, Netanya
Referee: Eitan Tabrizi & Liran Wachsberger

== Winners ==
2013 Israeli Beach Soccer League
Winners:

Kfar Qassem BS Club (beach soccer)
Second title

== Awards ==
Best Player (MVP)
(Brazil) Dino (Bnei "Falfala" Kfar Qassem)
Top Scorer
(Brazil) Dino (Bnei "Falfala" Kfar Qassem)
15 goals
Best Goalkeeper
(Israel) Avi Ivgi (Maccabi "Doron Motors" Netanya)

== See also ==
- Israeli Beach Soccer League
