= 2014 Israeli Beach Soccer League =

Tournament details
- Host country: Israel
- Dates: 13 June – 25 July 2014
- Teams: 10 (from 1 confederation)
- Venue(s): 1 (in 1 host city)

Final positions
- Champions: Maccabi "Doron Motors" Netanya (2nd title)
- Runners-up: Ironi "Keitering Hayetzira" Petah Tikva

Tournament statistics
- Matches played: 28
- Goals scored: 181 (6.46 per match)
- Top scorer(s): (Israel) Kobi Badash (Maccabi "Doron Motors" Netanya) (11 goals)

The 2014 Israeli Beach Soccer League was a national beach soccer league that took place between 13 June and 25 July 2014, in Netanya, Israel.

== Group stage ==
All kickoff times are of local time in Netanya, Israel (UTC+02:00).

=== Group A ===
Pos	Team	Pld	W	W+	WP	L	GF	GA	GD	Pts	Qualification
1	Bnei "Falfala" Kfar Qassem	4	3	0	0	1	18	11	+7	9	Clinched quarterfinal berth
2	Ironi "Keitering Hayetzira" Petah Tikva	4	3	0	0	1	18	14	+4	9	Clinched quarterfinal berth
3	Maccabi "Glidot Andrey" Jaffa	4	2	0	1	1	17	12	+5	8	Clinched quarterfinal berth
4	Ironi Rosh HaAyin	4	0	0	1	3	15	20	−5	2	Clinched quarterfinal berth
5	Hapoel "Amirey Park" Hedera	4	0	0	0	4	18	29	−11	0	Clinched relegation playoffs

13 June 2014
14:30

Bnei "Falfala" Kfar Qassem	4 - 3	Maccabi "Glidot Andrey" Jaffa
R. Badir; M. Sarsur	Report	Dos Santos

Poleg Beach, Netanya
13 June 2014
15:20

Ironi "Keitering Hayetzira" Petah Tikva	8 - 6	Hapoel "Amirey Park" Hedera
T. Ilos,, I. Bar David, E. Sasportas, W. Agbaria	Report	Y. Abutbul; R. Amran, S. Gormezano; K. Malul

Poleg Beach, Netanya

20 June 2014
14:30

Ironi Rosh HaAyin	3 - 3 (a.e.t.)	Maccabi "Glidot Andrey" Jaffa
V. Ganon 4'; J. King 12'; M. Silva 16'	Report	21', 32' E. Salami; 24' Almog Buzaglo
Penalties
Pampero (penalty missed)	0 - 1	(penalty scored) E. Salami

Poleg Beach, Netanya
20 June 2014
16:10

Bnei "Falfala" Kfar Qassem	v	Ironi "Keitering Hayetzira" Petah Tikva
	Report

Poleg Beach, Netanya

27 June 2014
15:20

Maccabi "Glidot Andrey" Jaffa	4 - 3	Ironi "Keitering Hayetzira" Petah Tikva
E. Salami		T. Ilos; I. Bar David

Poleg Beach, Netanya
27 June 2014
16:10

Hapoel "Amirey Park" Hedera	6 - 7 (a.e.t.)	Ironi Rosh HaAyin
M. Kirtava, Y. Abutbul; R. Amran; S. Gormezano		V. Ganon; M. Silva; A. Buzaglo, J. King
Penalties
S. Gormezano (penalty missed)	1 - 2

Poleg Beach, Netanya

4 July 2014
14:30

Hapoel "Amirey Park" Hedera	5 - 9	Bnei "Falfala" Kfar Qassem
R. Amran,,, H. Meri	Report	, N. Sarsur, S. Moreb, A. Yatim; R. Luna; R. Badir; D. da Silva

Poleg Beach, Netanya
4 July 2014
15:20

Ironi "Keitering Hayetzira" Petah Tikva	7 - 4	Ironi Rosh HaAyin
I. Zarfati, I. Bar David, N. Sapir; G. Sharvit; L. Ben Ari	Report	, M. Silva; Pampero; R. Mesika

Poleg Beach, Netanya

11 July 2014
15:20

Maccabi "Glidot Andrey" Jaffa	7 - 2	Hapoel "Amirey Park" Hedera
E. Salami 2', 4', 14'; G. Eini 11', 19', 22'; A. Buzaglo 13'	Report	Y. Abutbul; 18' H. Meri

Poleg Beach, Netanya
11 July 2014
17:05

Ironi Rosh HaAyin	3 - 5	Bnei "Falfala" Kfar Qassem
M. Asulin; Almog Buzaglo	Report	, Dino; A. Yatim; D. da Silva; M. Sarsur

Poleg Beach, Netanya

=== Group B ===
Pos	Team	Pld	W	W+	WP	L	GF	GA	GD	Pts	Qualification
1	Beitar "Eldad Peri" Jerusalem	4	3	0	0	1	7	5	+2	9	Clinched quarterfinal berth
2	Maccabi "Doron Motors" Netanya	4	2	0	0	2	21	9	+12	6	Clinched quarterfinal berth
3	"A.M.I. Yakutiel" Maccabi Tel Aviv	4	2	0	0	2	7	15	−8	6	Clinched quarterfinal berth
4	Hapoel "Yaniv" Holon	4	1	0	1	2	4	10	−6	5	Clinched quarterfinal berth
5	Maccabi "Ido Keren" Haifa	4	1	0	0	3	12	13	−1	3	Clinched relegation playoffs

13 June 2014
16:10

"A.M.I. Yakutiel" Maccabi Tel Aviv	2 - 0	Beitar "Eldad Peri" Jerusalem
L. Berkovich,	Report

Poleg Beach, Netanya
13 June 2014
17:05

Maccabi "Doron Motors" Netanya	v	Maccabi "Ido Keren" Haifa
	Report

Poleg Beach, Netanya

20 June 2014
15:20

Maccabi "Ido Keren" Haifa	v	"A.M.I. Yakutiel" Maccabi Tel Aviv
	Report

Poleg Beach, Netanya
20 June 2014
17:05

Hapoel "Yaniv" Holon	v	Maccabi "Doron Motors" Netanya
	Report

Poleg Beach, Netanya

27 June 2014
14:30

Beitar "Eldad Peri" Jerusalem	v	Hapoel "Yaniv" Holon

Poleg Beach, Netanya
27 June 2014
17:05

Maccabi "Doron Motors" Netanya	10 - 0	"A.M.I. Yakutiel" Maccabi Tel Aviv
K. Badash, A. Nakash; T. Goto; A. Levy; A. Danin,, A. Lam,

Poleg Beach, Netanya

4 July 2014
16:10

Hapoel "Yaniv" Holon	5 - 3	Maccabi "Ido Keren" Haifa
M. Kandil,, O. Halwani; O. Zvulun	Report	M. Baraness; A. Diab; R. Glik

Poleg Beach, Netanya
4 July 2014
17:05

Beitar "Eldad Peri" Jerusalem	4 - 2	Maccabi "Doron Motors" Netanya
A. Mauda,, M. Amar	Report	K. Badash; O. Pahima

Poleg Beach, Netanya

11 July 2014
14:30

"A.M.I. Yakutiel" Maccabi Tel Aviv	3 - 1	Hapoel "Yaniv" Holon
O. Halwani 20'; D. Maradona 32'; E. Tzabari 35'	Report	30' E. Shiki

Poleg Beach, Netanya
11 July 2014
16:10

Maccabi "Ido Keren" Haifa	2 - 3	Beitar "Eldad Peri" Jerusalem
N. Revivo; N. Cohen	Report	(o.g.) O. Kuprayev (o.g.) R. Glik; M. Amar

Poleg Beach, Netanya

== Knockout stage ==
Quarter-finals
18 July 2014
Bnei "Falfala" Kfar Qassem	5
Hapoel "Yaniv" Holon	6
18 July 2014
Ironi "Keitering Hayetzira" Petah Tikva (p)	2 (1)
"A.M.I. Yakutiel" Maccabi Tel Aviv	2 (0)
18 July 2014
Beitar "Eldad Peri" Jerusalem	2
Ironi Rosh HaAyin	5
18 July 2014
Maccabi "Doron Motors" Netanya	7
Maccabi "Glidot Andrey" Jaffa	0

Semi-finals
25 July 2014
Hapoel "Yaniv" Holon	0
Maccabi "Doron Motors" Netanya	6
25 July 2014
Ironi "Keitering Hayetzira" Petah Tikva
Ironi Rosh HaAyin

Final
25 July 2014
Maccabi "Doron Motors" Netanya	8
Ironi "Keitering Hayetzira" Petah Tikva	3

=== Quarter-finals ===
18 July 2014
14:20

Bnei "Falfala" Kfar Qassem	5 - 6	Hapoel "Yaniv" Holon
A. Yatim; S. Moreb; Dino, D. da Silva	Report	, Y. Sabag; O. Halwani; A. Gobeza; M. Kandil; P. Emola

Poleg Beach, Netanya

18 July 2014
15:10

Ironi "Keitering Hayetzira" Petah Tikva	2 - 2 (a.e.t.)	"A.M.I. Yakutiel" Maccabi Tel Aviv
I. Bar David 1'; E. Shiki (o.g.)	Report	D. Maradona; L. Berkovich
Penalties
T. Ilos (penalty scored)	1 - 0	(penalty missed) L. Berkovich

Poleg Beach, Netanya

18 July 2014
16:30

Beitar "Eldad Peri" Jerusalem	2 - 5	Ironi Rosh HaAyin
A. Mauda; S. Katzar	Report	, Pampero; J. King; V. Ganon

Poleg Beach, Netanya

18 July 2014
17:20

Maccabi "Doron Motors" Netanya	7 - 0	Maccabi "Glidot Andrey" Jaffa
K. Badash,,, A. Levy; Kuman; O. Pahima	Report

Poleg Beach, Netanya

=== Semi-finals ===
25 July 2014
14:00

Hapoel "Yaniv" Holon	0 - 6	Maccabi "Doron Motors" Netanya
	Report	, A. Danin; A. Lam, Kuman; B. Briga

Poleg Beach, Netanya

25 July 2014
14:50

Ironi "Keitering Hayetzira" Petah Tikva	v	Ironi Rosh HaAyin
	Report

Poleg Beach, Netanya

=== Reglegation playoffs ===
25 July 2014
15:40

Hapoel "Amirey Park" Hedera	4 - 7	Maccabi "Ido Keren" Haifa
R. Amran, Y. Abutbul; E. Cohen	Report	O. Kuprayev,, N. Revivo; Y. Aharoni; N. Cohen

Poleg Beach, Netanya

=== Final ===
25 July 2014
17:30

Maccabi "Doron Motors" Netanya	8 - 3	Ironi "Keitering Hayetzira" Petah Tikva
Kuman 3', 23', 28'; Fran 14'; A. Danin 19'; A. Lam 31'; K. Badash 33', 34'	Report	10' W. Agbaria; 24' T. Ilos; 36'

Poleg Beach, Netanya

== Winners ==
2014 Israeli Beach Soccer League
Winners:

Maccabi "Doron Motors" Netanya
Second title

== Awards ==
Top Scorer
(Israel) Kobi Badash (Maccabi "Doron Motors" Netanya)
11 goals
