= 2017 Israeli Beach Soccer League =

Tournament details
- Host country: Israel
- Dates: 9 June – 21 July 2017
- Teams: 12 (from 1 confederation)
- Venue(s): 1 (in 1 host city)

Final positions
- Champions: Maccabi "RE/MAX" Netanya (3rd title)
- Runners-up: Bnei "Falfala" Kfar Qassem

Tournament statistics
- Matches played: 41
- Goals scored: 355 (8.66 per match)
- Top scorer(s): (Spain) Juan Bazo (Maccabi "RE/MAX" Netanya) (14 goals)
- Best player(s): (Spain) Fran (Maccabi "RE/MAX" Netanya)

The 2017 Israeli Beach Soccer League was a national beach soccer league that took place between 9 June and 21 July 2017, in Netanya, Israel.

== Group stage ==
All kickoff times are of local time in Netanya, Israel (UTC+02:00).

=== Group A ===
Pos	Team	Pld	W	W+	WP	L	GF	GA	GD	Pts	Qualification
1	Maccabi "RE/MAX" Netanya	5	5	0	0	0	35	12	+23	15	Clinched quarterfinal berth
2	Bnei "Falfala" Kfar Qassem	5	4	0	0	1	28	12	+16	12	Clinched quarterfinal berth
3	Beitar Jerusalem	5	3	0	0	2	26	23	+3	9	Clinched quarterfinal berth
4	Hapoel "Shaltal" Karmiel	5	2	0	0	3	26	28	−2	6	Clinched quarterfinal berth
5	"A. Tahzokat Otobosim" Haifa	5	1	0	0	4	22	31	−9	3	Clinched relegation playoffs
6	Ihud "Mashtelat" Bnei Sakhnin	5	0	0	0	5	12	43	−31	0	Clinched relegation playoffs

9 June 2017
13:00

Bnei "Falfala" Kfar Qassem	7 - 2	Ihud "Mashtelat" Bnei Sakhnin
D. da Silva 4'; M. Amer 5', 22'; R. Badir 12'; A. Yatim 20'; A. Sarsur 23'; A. da Silva 36'	Report	27' H. Jabaren; 35' H. Suan

"Schwartz Home" Arena, Poleg Beach, Netanya
Referee: Eli Hacmon & David Mor Haim

9 June 2017
15:40

"A. Tahzokat Otobosim" Haifa	6 - 8	Hapoel "Shaltal" Karmiel
N. Revivo 18', 19'; B. Shem Tov 25'; I. Srur 27'; G. Asulin 31', 34'	Report	1', 20', 29', 36' S. Gormezano; 10', 17' D. Halevi; 11', 35' O. Halevi

"Schwartz Home" Arena, Poleg Beach, Netanya

9 June 2017
17:20

Maccabi "RE/MAX" Netanya	6 - 3	Beitar Jerusalem
Fran 3'; B. Briga 22'; O. Boaron 29', 34'; A. Levi 30'; Juan Bazo 35'	Report	6' I. Bar David; 24' D. Alberman; 35' S. Ifrah

"Schwartz Home" Arena, Poleg Beach, Netanya

16 June 2017
13:50

Ihud "Mashtelat" Bnei Sakhnin	3 - 7	Beitar Jerusalem
M. Awad 10'; H. Jabaren 16'; W. Harbawi 20'	Report	13', 17' R. Amran; 14', 15', (red card) 27' I. Bar David; 24', 34' Y. Shina; 32' G. Sharvit

"Schwartz Home" Arena, Poleg Beach, Netanya
Referee: Eli Hacmon

16 June 2017
16:30

"A. Tahzokat Otobosim" Haifa	2 - 8	Bnei "Falfala" Kfar Qassem
B. Shem Tov 10'; N. Revivo 27'	Report	1', 11', 29' A. Yatim; 3' K. Frij; 8' A. da Silva; 12' A. Sarsur; 21' N. Sarsur; 28' M. Amer

"Schwartz Home" Arena, Poleg Beach, Netanya
Referee: Moshe Bohbot

16 June 2017
17:20

Hapoel "Shaltal" Karmiel	2 - 7	Maccabi "RE/MAX" Netanya
S. Gormezano 28'; O. Halevi 33'	Report	14' Fran; 16', 23', 29', 35' Juan Bazo; 18' O. Boaron; 34' E. Tzabari

"Schwartz Home" Arena, Poleg Beach, Netanya
Referee: Moshe Bohbot

23 June 2017
12:10

Bnei "Falfala" Kfar Qassem	6 - 0	Beitar Jerusalem
R. Badir 12'; A. da Silva 15'; M. Amer 18'; D. da Silva 30'; N. Sarsur 32'; A. Abu Sbeet 36'	Report

"Schwartz Home" Arena, Poleg Beach, Netanya

23 June 2017
13:00

Maccabi "RE/MAX" Netanya	4 - 3	"A. Tahzokat Otobosim" Haifa
Reyder 3'; Fran 5', 22'; Juan Bazo 32'	Report	20' B. Shem Tov; 32' (o.g.) Fran; 36' I. Srur

"Schwartz Home" Arena, Poleg Beach, Netanya
Referee: Eli Hacmon

23 June 2017
15:30

Ihud "Mashtelat" Bnei Sakhnin	1 - 8	Hapoel "Shaltal" Karmiel
F. Ghnaim 16'	Report	3', 12', 15', S. Gormezano; 4', 36' V. Ganon; 9' T. Azulay; 11' O. Atiya; 23' A. Ben Shabat

"Schwartz Home" Arena, Poleg Beach, Netanya

30 June 2017
13:50

Bnei "Falfala" Kfar Qassem	6 - 2	Hapoel "Shaltal" Karmiel
A. Yatim 12', 22'; A. da Silva 20'; Dino 25', 35'; D. da Silva 32'	Report	19' D. Halevi; (yellow card) 22' (red card) V. Ganon; 24' T. Azulay

"Schwartz Home" Arena, Poleg Beach, Netanya
Referee: Eli Hacmon

30 June 2017
16:30

Beitar Jerusalem	8 - 2	"A. Tahzokat Otobosim" Haifa
Y. Shina 1', 16', 18'; I. Bar David 3', 29'; N. Cohen 4'; Y. Abitbul 5', 19'	Report	6' A. Cohen; 29' B. Shem Tov

"Schwartz Home" Arena, Poleg Beach, Netanya

30 June 2017
17:20

Maccabi "RE/MAX" Netanya	12 - 3	Ihud "Mashtelat" Bnei Sakhnin
Fran 1', 34'; B. Briga 4', 20'; E. Tzabari 7', 23'; A. Levi 8', 35'; Juan Bazo 16', 19'; Reyder 27'; O. Boaron 33'	Report	8' M. Awad; 11' M. Badarna; 25' H. Jabaren

"Schwartz Home" Arena, Poleg Beach, Netanya
Referee: David Mor Haim & Idan Bernstein

7 July 2017
13:00

"A. Tahzokat Otobosim" Haifa	9 - 3	Ihud "Mashtelat" Bnei Sakhnin
N. Revivo 1', 31'; B. Shem Tov 2', 14', 15', 35'; L. Tal 8'; K. Okashi 22', 25'	Report	9', 31' H. Jabaren; 33' H. Suan

"Schwartz Home" Arena, Poleg Beach, Netanya
Referee: Igal Isakov & David Mor Haim

7 July 2017
15:40

Beitar Jerusalem	8 - 6	Hapoel "Shaltal" Karmiel
G. Sharvit 9'; Y. Shina 17', 35'; I. Bar David 24', 36', 36'; N. Cohen 31'; Y. Abitbul 32'	Report	2', 6', 11', 21' O. Halevi; 5', 18' D. Halevi

"Schwartz Home" Arena, Poleg Beach, Netanya
Referee: Tzvika Levy

7 July 2017
17:20

Bnei "Falfala" Kfar Qassem	1 - 6	Maccabi "RE/MAX" Netanya
M. Amer 20'	Report	12' Fran; 19' B. Briga; 24', 28' Juan Bazo; 33' A. Lam; 34' Reyder

"Schwartz Home" Arena, Poleg Beach, Netanya
Referee: Guy Berger & Tzvika Levy

=== Group B ===
Pos	Team	Pld	W	W+	WP	L	GF	GA	GD	Pts	Qualification
1	"Schwartz Home" Rosh HaAyin	5	3	0	1	1	26	15	+11	11	Clinched quarterfinal berth
2	Ironi "Office Depot" Petah Tikva	5	3	0	0	2	26	15	+11	9	Clinched quarterfinal berth
3	"Roah Bakfar" Tel Aviv	5	3	0	0	2	23	19	+4	9	Clinched quarterfinal berth
4	Bnei Yehuda "Shemesh"	5	2	1	0	2	12	18	−6	9	Clinched quarterfinal berth
5	Hapoel "Mol Hahof" Hedera	5	2	0	0	3	22	23	−1	6	Clinched relegation playoffs
6	Hapoel "AuntieAnnes" Holon	5	0	0	0	5	9	28	−19	0	Clinched relegation playoffs

9 June 2017
13:50

Hapoel "Mol Hahof" Hedera	6 - 7	"Roah Bakfar" Tel Aviv
O. Ifrah 1', 36'; I. Sharon 11'; N. Sharon 16'; A. Hadad 34'; M. Ben Lulu 36'	Report	4' T. Goto; 12' A. Atiya; 13', 15' E. Ben Menashe; 23' O. Yehezkel; 34', 36' N. Mechani

"Schwartz Home" Arena, Poleg Beach, Netanya
Referee: Eli Hacmon

9 June 2017
14:50

Bnei Yehuda "Shemesh"	2 - 1 (a.e.t.)	Hapoel "AuntieAnnes" Holon
B. Salmon 8'; K. Cohen 38'	Report	24' O. Halwani

"Schwartz Home" Arena, Poleg Beach, Netanya
Referee: David Mor Haim

9 June 2017
16:30

"Schwartz Home" Rosh HaAyin	3 - 4	Ironi "Office Depot" Petah Tikva
K. Badash 1', 18', 25'	Report	7' T. Ilos; 23' A. Ventura; 29' D. Gomez; 33' A. Danin

"Schwartz Home" Arena, Poleg Beach, Netanya

16 June 2017
13:00

Ironi "Office Depot" Petah Tikva	6 - 2	Bnei Yehuda "Shemesh"
T. Ilos 6', 14'; D. Maradona 7', 18'; A. Ventura 9'; Heverton 12'	Report	17' E. Salami; 34' E. Magol

"Schwartz Home" Arena, Poleg Beach, Netanya
Referee: Noam Salooma

16 June 2017
14:50

Hapoel "AuntieAnnes" Holon	1 - 5	Hapoel "Mol Hahof" Hedera
S. Edri 16'	Report	10', 28' M. Kirtava; 19' I. Sharon; 22', 32' O. Ifrah

"Schwartz Home" Arena, Poleg Beach, Netanya
Referee: Eli Hacmon

16 June 2017
15:40

"Roah Bakfar" Tel Aviv	4 - 4 (a.e.t.)	"Schwartz Home" Rosh HaAyin
N. Mechani 19'; O. Yehezkel 21'; T. Goto 28'; A. Shimshi 29'	Report	11', 36' Dieginio; 20' Benjamin Jr. 23' A. Frutos
Penalties
T. Goto (penalty scored); E. Ben Menashe (penalty missed)	1 - 2	(penalty scored) K. Badash; (penalty scored) Dieginio

"Schwartz Home" Arena, Poleg Beach, Netanya

23 June 2017
13:50

"Schwartz Home" Rosh HaAyin	5 - 2	Hapoel "AuntieAnnes" Holon
Dieginio 7'; A. Frutos 12'; N. Sapir 18'; Benjamin Jr. 32'; A. Ben Muha 35'	Report	22' O. Halwani; 22' R. Gershomov

"Schwartz Home" Arena, Poleg Beach, Netanya
Referee: Eli Hacmon & David Mor Haim

23 June 2017
14:40

Bnei Yehuda "Shemesh"	4 - 3	Hapoel "Mol Hahof" Hedera
E. Magol 12', 36'; R. Peretz 32'; E. Salami 36'	Report	12', 36' E. Sasportas; 27' I. Sharon

"Schwartz Home" Arena, Poleg Beach, Netanya

23 June 2017
16:20

"Roah Bakfar" Tel Aviv	4 - 3	Ironi "Office Depot" Petah Tikva
T. Goto 5', 35'; T. Nakamura 13'; N. Mechani 28'	Report	22', 32' A. Danin; 31' T. Ilos

"Schwartz Home" Arena, Poleg Beach, Netanya
Referee: Idan Bernstein

30 June 2017
13:00

Hapoel "AuntieAnnes" Holon	3 - 6	"Roah Bakfar" Tel Aviv
O. Halwani 6'; S. Edri 11', 29'	Report	3' T. Shriki; 18', 22', 28', 35' T. Goto; 34' N. Mechani

"Schwartz Home" Arena, Poleg Beach, Netanya

30 June 2017
14:50

Hapoel "Mol Hahof" Hedera	4 - 3	Ironi "Office Depot" Petah Tikva
M. Kirtava 8'; E. Sasportas 11', 23'; O. Ifrah 20'	Report	18' D. Maradona; 26' T. Ilos; 28' A. Halifa

"Schwartz Home" Arena, Poleg Beach, Netanya

30 June 2017
15:40

Bnei Yehuda "Shemesh"	1 - 6	"Schwartz Home" Rosh HaAyin
E. Magol 18'	Report	3', 11' E. Cohen; 6' A. Frutos; 13', 24' Benjamin Jr. 30' K. Badash

"Schwartz Home" Arena, Poleg Beach, Netanya

7 July 2017
13:50

"Roah Bakfar" Tel Aviv	2 - 3	Bnei Yehuda "Shemesh"
T. Goto 16', 19'	Report	4' R. Peretz; 29' E. Salami; 31' E. Magol

"Schwartz Home" Arena, Poleg Beach, Netanya
Referee: David Mor Haim

7 July 2017
14:50

Ironi "Office Depot" Petah Tikva	10 - 2	Hapoel "AuntieAnnes" Holon
T. Ilos 1', 3', 26', 34'; O. Ilos 10', 29'; A. Halifa 14'; D. Maradona 15', 22'; T. Shulkowsky 18'	Report	25', 28' R. Gershomov

"Schwartz Home" Arena, Poleg Beach, Netanya

7 July 2017
16:30

"Schwartz Home" Rosh HaAyin	8 - 4	Hapoel "Mol Hahof" Hedera
E. Cohen 12', 22'; A. Frutos 15', 24', 24'; Benjamin Jr. 19'; K. Badash 19'; Dieginio 33'	Report	7', 24' O. Ifrah; 12', 22' M. Kirtava

"Schwartz Home" Arena, Poleg Beach, Netanya
Referee: Guy Berger

== Relegation playoffs (Loser on Final is relegated) ==
Semi-finals
14 July 2017
"A. Tahzokat Otobosim" Haifa	9
Hapoel "AuntieAnnes" Holon	3
14 July 2017
Ihud "Mashtelat" Bnei Sakhnin	3
Hapoel "Mol Hahof" Hedera	9

Final
21 July 2017
Hapoel "AuntieAnnes" Holon (a.e.t.)	5
Ihud "Mashtelat" Bnei Sakhnin	4

=== Relegation playoffs ===
14 July 2017
13:10

Ihud "Mashtelat" Bnei Sakhnin	3 - 9	Hapoel "Mol Hahof" Hedera
H. Jabaren 11', 14'; M. Badarna 34'	Report	1' O. Ifrah; 3', 22' M. Kirtava; 5' G. Eini; 7' A. Shemesh; 18', 22' E. Sasportas; 31' A. Bunker; 36' A. Hakak

"Schwartz Home" Arena, Poleg Beach, Netanya
Referee: Eli Hacmon & Igal Isakov

14 July 2017
14:00

"A. Tahzokat Otobosim" Haifa	9 - 3	Hapoel "AuntieAnnes" Holon
N. Revivo 4', 20', 32', 33'; A. Cohen 12'; G. Asulin 13'; I. Srur 13'; L. Tal 22'; Y. Sabag 25' (o.g.)	Report	19' S. Edri; 21' Y. Machluf; 31' O. Halwani

"Schwartz Home" Arena, Poleg Beach, Netanya

== Knockout stage ==
Quarter-finals
14 July 2017
"Schwartz Home" Rosh HaAyin	2
Hapoel "Shaltel" Karmiel	4
14 July 2017
Ironi "Office Depot" Petah Tikva	8
Beitar Jerusalem	4
14 July 2017
Bnei "Falfala" Kfar Qassem	4
"Roah Bakfar" Tel Aviv	2
14 July 2017
Maccabi "RE/MAX" Netanya	4
Bnei Yehuda "Shemesh"	1

Semi-finals
21 July 2017
Maccabi "RE/MAX" Netanya	6
Ironi "Office Depot" Petah Tikva	0
21 July 2017
Bnei "Falfala" Kfar Qassem	6
Hapoel "Shaltel" Karmiel	3

Final
21 July 2017
Bnei "Falfala" Kfar Qassem	3
Maccabi "RE/MAX" Netanya	4

=== Yahav Friendship Cup ===
23 June 2017
17:15

Israel	7 - 3	Netherlands
N. Revivo 19'; A. Levi 24', 25'; N. Sarsur 26'; S. Gormezano 33'; V. Ganon 34'; Y. Shina 35'	Report	1', 35' M. Wolf; 22', (red card) 29' L. Dirkhausen

"Schwartz Home" Arena, Poleg Beach, Netanya
Referee: (Netherlands) Michael Medina & (Israel) Tzvika Levy

=== Quarter-finals ===
14 July 2017
14:50

"Schwartz Home" Rosh HaAyin	2 - 4	Hapoel "Shaltel" Karmiel
K. Badash 5'; A. Frutos 24'	Report	2', 18' Madjer; 27' O. Halevi; 34' D. Halevi

"Schwartz Home" Arena, Poleg Beach, Netanya
Referee: Eli Hacmon

14 July 2017
15:40

Ironi "Office Depot" Petah Tikva	8 - 4	Beitar Jerusalem
O. Ilos 2', 12', 30'; T. Ilos 5', 14', 19'; S. Ifrah 21' (o.g.); Heverton 35'	Report	1', 13', 36' R. Amran; 23' S. Katzar

"Schwartz Home" Arena, Poleg Beach, Netanya
Referee: Tzvika Levy & Noam Salooma

14 July 2017
16:30

Bnei "Falfala" Kfar Qassem	4 - 2	"Roah Bakfar" Tel Aviv
Dino 5'; D. da Silva 24', 29', 33'	Report	10', 26' T. Goto; (yellow card) 36' (red card) O. Yehezkel

"Schwartz Home" Arena, Poleg Beach, Netanya
Referee: Tzvika Levy & Guy Berger

14 July 2017
17:20

Maccabi "RE/MAX" Netanya	4 - 1	Bnei Yehuda "Shemesh"
Juan Bazo 14'; E. Tzabari 15', 34'; Fran 36'; O. Boaron (red card) 36'	Report	A. Levi 17' (o.g.); (red card) 36' K. Cohen

"Schwartz Home" Arena, Poleg Beach, Netanya
Referee: Guy Berger

=== Semi-finals ===
21 July 2017
13:00

Bnei "Falfala" Kfar Qassem	6 - 3	Hapoel "Shaltel" Karmiel
A. Yatim 11', 34'; D. da Silva, 36'; S. Moreb; N. Sarsur	Report	12' D. Halevi; A. Malca; 29' O. Halevi; (red card) 36' G. Mizdraje

"Schwartz Home" Arena, Poleg Beach, Netanya
Referee: David Mor Haim & Moshe Bohbot

21 July 2017
14:00

Maccabi "RE/MAX" Netanya	6 - 0	Ironi "Office Depot" Petah Tikva
Juan Bazo 3', 14', 26'; Chiky 5'; Fran 24'	Report

"Schwartz Home" Arena, Poleg Beach, Netanya
Referee: David Mor Haim & Moshe Bohbot

=== Youth Final ===
21 July 2017
15:00

"Idan" Dora Netanya	1 - 3	"Agadat Hahof" Nordau
R. Udi 22'	Report	8', 17', 23' N. Hagani

"Schwartz Home" Arena, Poleg Beach, Netanya

=== Survival match ===
21 July 2017
15:50

Hapoel "AuntieAnnes" Holon	5 - 4 (a.e.t.)	Ihud "Mashtelat" Bnei Sakhnin
O. Halwani 19'; A. Zvulun 24'; Y. Machluf 26'; S. Kophman 30'; Y. Sabag 39'	Report	8', 27' H. Jabaren; 21' M. Shalata; 35' O. Badran

"Schwartz Home" Arena, Poleg Beach, Netanya

=== Final ===
21 July 2017
17:10

Bnei "Falfala" Kfar Qassem	3 - 4	Maccabi "RE/MAX" Netanya
Dino 13'; A. Yatim 15', (yellow card) 24' (red card); N. Sarsur 17'	Report	16' B. Briga; 30' A. da Silva; 33' Chiky; 36' Fran

"Schwartz Home" Arena, Poleg Beach, Netanya
Attendance: 2,500
Referee: Eli Hacmon & Tzvika Levy

== Goalscorers ==
14 goals

- Juan Bazo (Maccabi "RE/MAX" Netanya)

12 goals

- T. Ilos (Ironi "Office Depot" Petah Tikva)
- T. Goto ("Roah Bakfar" Tel Aviv)

10 goals

- Fran (Maccabi "RE/MAX" Netanya)

9 goals

- A. Yatim (Bnei "Falfala" Kfar Qassem)
- O. Halevi (Hapoel "Shaltal" Karmiel)
- N. Revivo ("A. Tahzokat Otobosim" Haifa)
- H. Jabaren (Ihud "Mashtelat" Bnei Sakhnin)

8 goals

- D. da Silva (Bnei "Falfala" Kfar Qassem)
- S. Gormezano (Hapoel "Shaltal" Karmiel)
- I. Bar David (Beitar Jerusalem)
- M. Kirtava (Hapoel "Mol Hahof" Hedera)
- O. Ifrah (Hapoel "Mol Hahof" Hedera)
- B. Shem Tov ("A. Tahzokat Otobosim" Haifa)

7 goals

- D. Halevi (Hapoel "Shaltal" Karmiel)
- A. Frutos ("Schwartz Home" Rosh HaAyin)
- Y. Shina (Beitar Jerusalem)

6 goals

- K. Badash "Schwartz Home" Rosh HaAyin)
- E. Sasportas (Hapoel "Mol Hahof" Hedera)

5 goals

- B. Briga (Maccabi "RE/MAX" Netanya)
- E. Tzabari (Maccabi "RE/MAX" Netanya)
- M. Amer (Bnei "Falfala" Kfar Qassem)
- O. Ilos (Ironi "Office Depot" Petah Tikva)
- Benjamin Jr. ("Schwartz Home" Rosh HaAyin)
- N. Mechani ("Roah Bakfar" Tel Aviv)
- R. Amran (Beitar Jerusalem)
- E. Magol (Bnei Yehuda "Shemesh")
- O. Halwani (Hapoel "AuntieAnnes" Holon)

4 goals

- O. Boaron (Maccabi "RE/MAX" Netanya)
- Dino (Bnei "Falfala" Kfar Qassem)
- A. da Silva (Bnei "Falfala" Kfar Qassem)
- N. Sarsur (Bnei "Falfala" Kfar Qassem)
- D. Maradona (Ironi "Office Depot" Petah Tikva)
- E. Cohen ("Schwartz Home" Rosh HaAyin)
- Dieginio ("Schwartz Home" Rosh HaAyin)
- S. Edri (Hapoel "AuntieAnnes" Holon)
- R. Gershomov (Hapoel "AuntieAnnes" Holon)

3 goals

- Reyder (Maccabi "RE/MAX" Netanya)
- A. Levi (Maccabi "RE/MAX" Netanya)
- A. Danin (Ironi "Office Depot" Petah Tikva)
- Y. Abitbul (Beitar Jerusalem)
- E. Salami (Bnei Yehuda "Shemesh")
- I. Srur ("A. Tahzokat Otobosim" Haifa)
- G. Asulin ("A. Tahzokat Otobosim" Haifa)
- I. Sharon (Hapoel "Mol Hahof" Hedera)

2 goals

- Chiky (Maccabi "RE/MAX" Netanya)
- S. Moreb (Bnei "Falfala" Kfar Qassem)
- A. Sarsur (Bnei "Falfala" Kfar Qassem)
- R. Badir (Bnei "Falfala" Kfar Qassem)
- Madjer (Hapoel "Shaltal" Karmiel)
- V. Ganon (Hapoel "Shaltal" Karmiel)
- T. Azulay (Hapoel "Shaltal" Karmiel)
- Heverton (Ironi "Office Depot" Petah Tikva)
- A. Halifa (Ironi "Office Depot" Petah Tikva)
- A. Ventura (Ironi "Office Depot" Petah Tikva)
- O. Yehezkel ("Roah Bakfar" Tel Aviv)
- E. Ben Menashe ("Roah Bakfar" Tel Aviv)
- N. Cohen (Beitar Jerusalem)
- R. Peretz (Bnei Yehuda "Shemesh")
- A. Cohen (Hapoel "Mol Hahof" Hedera)
- L. Tal ("A. Tahzokat Otobosim" Haifa)
- K. Okashi ("A. Tahzokat Otobosim" Haifa)
- Y. Sabag (Hapoel "AuntieAnnes" Holon)
- Y. Machluf (Hapoel "AuntieAnnes" Holon)
- S. Kophman (Hapoel "AuntieAnnes" Holon)
- M. Badarna (Ihud "Mashtelat" Bnei Sakhnin)
- H. Suan (Ihud "Mashtelat" Bnei Sakhnin)
- M. Awad (Ihud "Mashtelat" Bnei Sakhnin)

== Winners ==
2017 Israeli Beach Soccer League
Winners:

Maccabi "RE/MAX" Netanya
Third title

== Awards ==
Best Player (MVP)
(Spain) Fran (Maccabi "RE/MAX" Netanya)
Top Scorer
(Spain) Juan Bazo (Maccabi "RE/MAX" Netanya)
14 goals
Best Goalkeeper
(Israel) Chen Berkovic (Maccabi "RE/MAX" Netanya)

== See also ==
- Israeli Beach Soccer League
