= Maccabi Netanya (beach soccer) =

Maccabi "RE/MAX" Netanya
- Full name: Maccabi "RE/MAX" Netanya
- Nickname: Yahalomim (Diamonds)
- Short name: Maccabi Netanya
- Founded: 2007 (as Netanya's Diamonds)
- Ground: "MODY" Arena, Poleg Beach, Netanya
- Chairman: Dudu Mahluf
- Coach: (Israel) Liron Fartok
- League: Israel Beach Soccer League
- 2019: 2nd

Maccabi Netanya or better known as Maccabi "RE/MAX" Netanya is a professional beach soccer team based in Netanya, Israel.

== 2019 Israeli Beach Soccer League squad ==
Note: Flags indicate national team as defined under FIFA eligibility rules; some limited exceptions apply. Players may hold more than one non-FIFA nationality.

No.	Pos.	Nation	Player
1	GK	ISR	Assaf Raz
2	MF	BRA	Rafael Silva Amorim (Rafinha)
3	DF	BRA	Antonio Bernardo de Farias Junior
4	DF	ISR	Ben Briga
6	DF	ISR	Alon Levi
7	MF	ISR	Adam Lam (captain)
8	MF	ISR	Omer Halevi

No.	Pos.	Nation	Player
10	FW	BRA	Lucas Tadeu Azevedo (Lucao)
11	FW	ISR	Elihay Tzabari
15	DF	ISR	Guy Eini
16	GK	ISR	Raz Zarka
18	GK	ISR	Avi Gabay
—	GK	ISR	Gaston Mizdraje

Coach: (Israel) Liron Fartok

== Honours ==
=== National competitions ===
- Israeli Beach Soccer League

- Winners (4):
  - 2007, 2014, 2017, 2018
- Runners-up (6):
  - 2009, 2010, 2011, 2013, 2015, 2019
