= Kfar Qassem BS Club (beach soccer) =

"Falfala" Kfar Qassem BS Club
- Full name: "Falfala" Kfar Qassem BS Club
- Nickname: Bnei Falfala (The sons of Falfala)
- Short name: Falfala
- Founded: 2007
- Chairman: Nimer Amer
- Coach: (Israel) Mamon Amer
- League: Israel Beach Soccer League
- 2025: 1st

Medal record

Beach soccer

Representing Israel

World Winners Cup
Gold medal – first place	2024 Alghero	
Gold medal – first place	2025 Sicily	

Euro Winners Cup
Gold medal – first place	2023 Nazaré	
Silver medal – second place	2025 Nazaré	

Israeli Championships
Gold medal – first place	2012 Netanya	
Gold medal – first place	2013 Netanya	
Gold medal – first place	2015 Netanya	
Gold medal – first place	2016 Netanya	
Gold medal – first place	2019 Netanya	
Gold medal – first place	2024 Rishon LeZion	
Silver medal – second place	2017 Netanya	
Silver medal – second place	2018 Netanya	

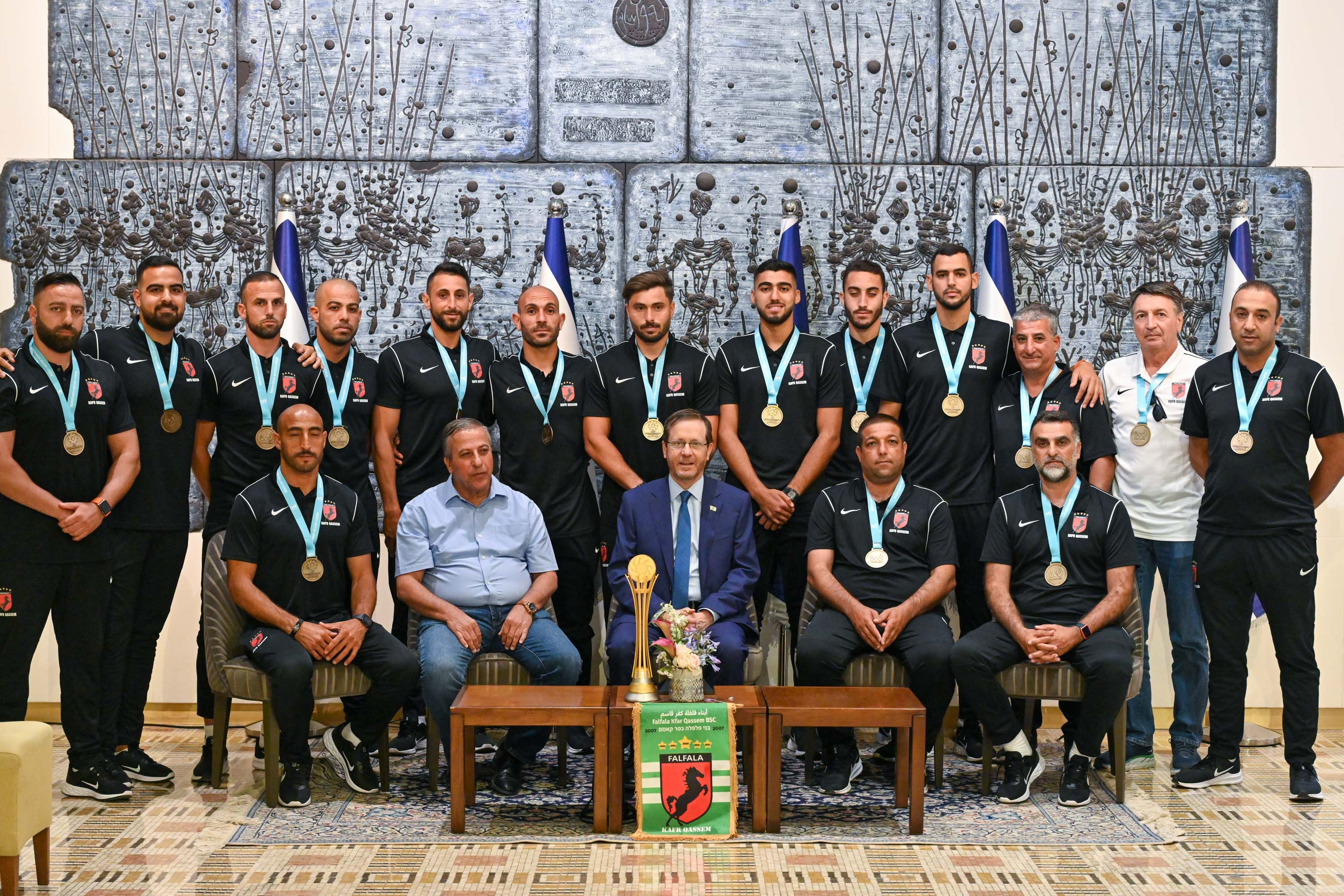
Isaac Herzog in Beit HaNassi with Kfar Qassem BS Club

Kfar Qassem BS Club (Hebrew: בני "פלפלה" כפר קאסם , Arabic: فلفلة أبناء كفر قاسم) is a professional beach soccer team based in Kfar Qassem, Israel. Kfar Qassem has won 5 national championships, more than any beach soccer team in Israel. In 2018, the club reached Nazaré Cup's final, but lost 2–3 to Kristall and therefore finished as the runners-up. In 2023, the club has won the Euro Winners Cup.

== Historical results ==
Competition	G	W	W+	WP	D	L	GF	GA	GD	Classification
2008 Israeli Beach Soccer League										4th place
2009 Israeli Beach Soccer League										3rd place
2012 Israeli Beach Soccer League										Champion
2013 Euro Winners Cup	3	0	0	1	0	2	9	16	-7	Group stage
2013 Israeli Beach Soccer League	8	7	0	0	0	1	31	18	+13	Champion
2014 Euro Winners Cup	3	1	0	0	0	2	11	11	0	Round of 16
2014 Israeli Beach Soccer League	5	3	0	0	0	2	23	17	+6	Quarter-final
2015 Israeli Beach Soccer League	8	8	0	0	0	0	44	20	+22	Champion
2016 Euro Winners Cup	4	2	0	0	0	2	21	15	+6	Round of 16
2016 Israeli Beach Soccer League	8	7	1	0	0	0	44	23	+19	Champion
2017 Euro Winners Cup	3	1	0	0	0	2	11	12	-1	Group stage
2017 Israeli Beach Soccer League	8	6	0	0	0	2	41	21	+20	Runners-up
2018 Nazaré Cup	7	6	0	0	0	1	49	24	+25	Runners-up
2018 Euro Winners Cup	10	8	0	0	0	2	61	33	+28	11th place (out of 58 beach soccer clubs)
2018 Israeli Beach Soccer League	8	6	0	0	0	2	40	22	+18	Runners-up
2019 Israeli Beach Soccer League	8	6	0	2	0	0	51	28	+23	Champion
2021 Euro Winners Cup	8	5	0	1	0	2	47	43	+4	9th place (out of 50 beach soccer clubs)
2022 Euro Winners Cup	7	6	0	0	0	1	39	18	+21	3rd place
2023 Euro Winners Cup	8	7	0	1	0	0	45	19	+26	Champion
2024 Euro Winners Cup	7	5	0	1	0	1	60	23	+37	5th place (out of 56 beach soccer clubs)
2024 Israeli Beach Soccer League	5	3	0	1	1	0	22	12	+10	Champion
2025 Euro Winners Cup	7	6	0	0	0	1	48	18	+30	Runners-up
2025 Israeli Beach Soccer League	5	4	0	1	1	0	18	13	+5	Champion

== Squads ==
=== 2019 Israeli Beach Soccer League squad ===
Note: Flags indicate national team as defined under FIFA eligibility rules; some limited exceptions apply. Players may hold more than one non-FIFA nationality.

No.	Pos.	Nation	Player
1	GK	ISR	Rani Odi
2	DF	BRA	Filipe da Silva
5	DF	ISR	Khalil Farig
7	MF	ISR	Hmada Jabaren
8	FW	ISR	Ahmad Sarsur (captain)
9	FW	ISR	Moad Amer
10	MF	ISR	Amar Yatim
11	FW	ISR	Muhammad "Noor" Sarsur
12	MF	ISR	Muhammad Amer

No.	Pos.	Nation	Player
13	GK	ISR	Isa Muhammad
14	DF	ISR	Mohamad Frig
15	MF	ISR	Hlal Yonis
17	FW	ISR	Sameh Moreb
19	FW	BRA	Rafael Bokinha
20	DF	ISR	Wassim Agbaria
21	DF	BRA	Bruno Xavier
22	GK	ISR	Abdel Rahim Sarsur

=== 2025 Euro Winners Cup squad ===
Note: Flags indicate national team as defined under FIFA eligibility rules; some limited exceptions apply. Players may hold more than one non-FIFA nationality.

No.	Pos.	Nation	Player
13	GK	SUI	Eliott Mounoud
3	FW	ISR	Elaeze Yousef
5	MF	BRA	Filipe da Silva
6	DF	ISR	Karam Amer
7	FW	ISR	Hmada Jabareen
9	FW	ISR	Moad Amer
10	FW	ISR	Amar Yatim (captain)

No.	Pos.	Nation	Player
11	DF	ISR	Sameh Moreb
12	DF	ISR	Elaeze Omri
17	FW	ISR	Omry Amer
19	FW	BRA	Rodrigo
20	DF	BRA	Dmais
22	GK	ISR	Abdel Rahim Sarsur

Coach: (Israel) Mamon Amer

== Honours ==
=== International competitions ===
- World Winners Cup

- Winners (2): 2024, 2025

- Euro Winners Cup

- Winners (1): 2023
- Runners-up (1): 2025

- Euro Winners Challenge

- Runners-up (1): 2018

=== National competitions ===
- Israeli Beach Soccer League

- Winners (7): 2012, 2013, 2015, 2016, 2019, 2024, 2025
- Runners-up (2): 2017, 2018
