= Israeli Beach Soccer League =

Top division in Israeli Beach Soccer league

- Sport: Beach Soccer
- Founded: 2007; 19 years ago
- No. of teams: 12
- Country: Israel
- Most recent champion: Bnei "Falfala" Kfar Qassem (7th title)
- Most titles: Bnei "Falfala" Kfar Qassem (7 titles)
- Broadcaster: Sport 5

The Israeli Beach Soccer League (Hebrew: הליגה הישראלית בכדורגל חופים), currently known as Ligat Bank Yahav (Hebrew: ליגת בנק יהב) for sponsorship reasons, is the top division in the Israeli Beach Soccer league. In July 2007 the league was inaugurated under the supervision of the Israel Football Association. To celebrate the launch of the league, a friendly game between national teams of England and Israel was played, with the Israelis winning 6–5.

== Background ==
The league first edition took place every Friday at Netanya Poleg beach on newly built beach sports stadium. The players participating in ligat San-Miguel were active and retired football players, Futsal players and some talents who was found by the league scouts. At the end of the season, "Netanya's diamonds" won the championship, after beating "MZ Rosh HaAyin" 5–2 in the final. An average of 9.23 goals per match was scored during the season, higher average than the average in most of the beach soccer World Cups.

The second season of the Israeli Beach Soccer League featured ten teams divided to two groups of five. Each team played one game against the teams in its group. The top four teams in each group qualified to the quarter finals, which was played on July 18 and 25, 2008.
The final-four matches and the relegation playoff were played on August 1. 90FM Hadera's Princes won the championship in its first season in the league, after a 7–6 win against Shav'e Shav'e Jerusalem.
The average number of goals dropped drastically in comparison with the first season, with 261 goals in 33 games, an average of 7.9 goals in a match.

The third season of the Israeli Beach Soccer won by Ironi Misadot Achla Petah Tikva after a 2–0 win against Netanya's Diamonds in the final on August 14, 2009.

The fourth season of the Israeli Beach Soccer won by "Kidmat Eden" Kfar Saba after a 5–3 win against Netanya's Diamonds in the final on August 20, 2010.

The fifth season of the Israeli Beach Soccer won by Ironi "Electis" Rosh HaAyin after an 8-5 win against Netanya's Diamonds in the final on July 29, 2011.

The sixth season of the Israeli Beach Soccer won by Bnei Kafr Qasim after a 2-1 penalty shoot out (the game ended at a 4-4 draw, after Rosh Ha'Ayin lead 4-0) against Ironi Rosh Ha'Ayin in the final on 20 July 2012.

The seventh season of the Israeli Beach Soccer won by Bnei Kafr Qasim after a 5-3 win against Maccabi "Doron Motors" Netanya in the final on 26 July 2013.

== Champions ==
| Season | Winner | Runner-up |
|---|---|---|
| 2007 | Netanya's Diamonds | MZ Rosh HaAyin |
| 2008 | Hadera's Princes | Shav'e Shav'e Jerusalem |
| 2009 | Ironi "Achla Restaurants" Petah Tikva | Netanya's Diamonds |
| 2010 | "Kidmat Eden" Kfar Saba | Netanya's Diamonds |
| 2011 | Ironi "Electis" Rosh Ha'Ayin | Netanya's Diamonds |
| 2012 | Bnei "Falfala" Kfar Qassem | Ironi Rosh Ha'Ayin |
| 2013 | Bnei "Falfala" Kfar Qassem | Maccabi "Doron Motors" Netanya |
| 2014 | Maccabi "Doron Motors" Netanya | Ironi "Catering Hayetzira" Petah Tikva |
| 2015 | Bnei "Falfala" Kfar Qassem | Maccabi "Doron Motors" Netanya |
| 2016 | Bnei "Falfala" Kfar Qassem | "Schwartz Home" Rosh HaAyin |
| 2017 | Maccabi "RE/MAX" Netanya | Bnei "Falfala" Kfar Qassem |
| 2018 | Maccabi "RE/MAX" Netanya | Bnei "Falfala" Kfar Qassem |
| 2019 | Bnei "Falfala" Kfar Qassem | Maccabi "RE/MAX" Netanya |
| 2024 | Bnei "Falfala" Kfar Qassem | Hapoel "Towers" Hedera |

== Israeli teams in Europe ==
After the first season of the league, the champion, Netanya's Diamonds, was invited to participate in the European Beach Soccer champions league. Netanya finished fourth, after defeating the Estonian champions 10–4 in the quarterfinals, losing to the Czech champions 7–8 after extra time in the semifinals, and losing to the Spanish champions 6–8 in the match for third place.
The runner-up, MZ Rosh HaAyin, was invited to the Capital Cup, the equivalent of association football's UEFA Cup. Rosh HaAyin won the tournament, after defeating AEK Limasol 3–1, Apoel Nicosia 5–2, AEK Thessaloniki 3–2 and Boca Juniors 6–3 in the final.

== National team ==
In June 2007 newborn Israel national team first participated in Group B qualifying games of Euro Beach Soccer League in Athens. After 6–6 draw they lose by penalty kicks to Russia, and celebrated first ever victory on Greece 2–1.

=== Diamonds Tournament ===
In August 2007 first ever Pro Beach Soccer Tour "Diamonds Tournament" was held in Israel. Four teams: Germany, Turkey, Israel and France led by Eric Cantona, took part. In the final Israel won Germany 4–3.

=== 2008 Challenge Cup ===
In June 2008 the FIFA Beach Soccer Challenge Cup was held in Israel. The six national teams competed to achieve single ticket to Group A of Euro Beach Soccer League. Czech Republic, Germany, Hungary, Israel, Norway and Turkey took part. Israel national team won the tournament beating in final Germany 4–3.
