= Eran Levi =

Israeli footballer (born 1985)

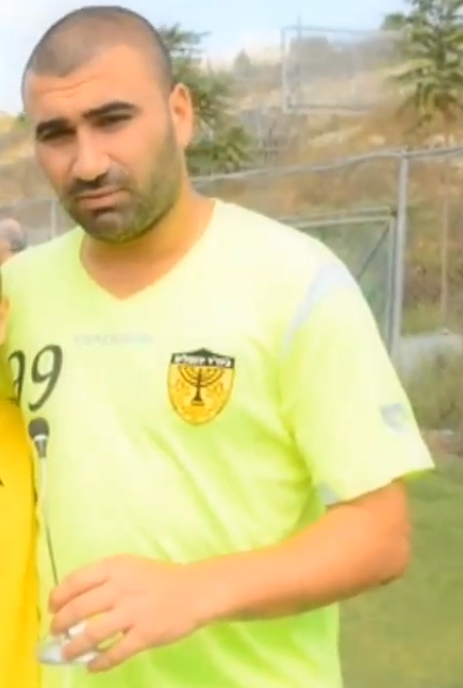
- Levi with Beitar Jerusalem in 2012

Personal information
- Date of birth: August 4, 1985 (age 41)
- Place of birth: Or Akiva, Israel
- Height: 5 ft 10 in (1.78 m)
- Position: Striker

Team information
- Current team: F.C. Or Akiva

Youth career
- Maccabi Haifa

Senior career*
Years	Team	Apps	(Gls)
2002–2004	Maccabi Haifa	18	(0)
2005	Maccabi Tel Aviv	11	(3)
2005–2006	Ironi Kiryat Shmona	28	(11)
2006	Maccabi Netanya	2	(0)
2006–2007	Hapoel Acre	11	(2)
2007–2010	Hapoel Haifa	86	(29)
2010–2011	Hapoel Ashkelon	11	(5)
2011	Hapoel Be'er Sheva	12	(3)
2011–2012	Hapoel Haifa	13	(2)
2012–2013	Beitar Jerusalem	38	(8)
2013–2018	Maccabi Netanya	122	(49)
2018–2019	Beitar Jerusalem	14	(0)
2019	Hapoel Katamon	11	(1)
2019	Hapoel Umm al-Fahm	1	(0)
2019–2020	Hapoel Afula	18	(4)
2020–2021	Hapoel Marmorek	21	(11)
2021–2022	Maccabi Kabilio Jaffa	24	(8)
2022	Hapoel Ra'anana	1	(0)
2022–2023	F.C. Kiryat Yam	8	(4)
2023–2024	Hapoel Ashdod	6	(0)
2024–	F.C. Or Akiva	0	(0)

International career
2001	Israel U16	4	(2)
2001–2005	Israel U17	8	(8)
2008–2009	Israel (beach soccer)	2	(2)
2018	Israel	1	(0)
- * Club domestic league appearances and goals as of 1 June 2023

Eran Levi (Hebrew: ערן לוי; born 4 August 1985) is an Israeli footballer who plays as a striker for F.C. Or Akiva.

== Career ==
Born in Or Akiva, Levi's professional career began with Maccabi Haifa, where he made his first-team debut in 2002, aged 17. He continued playing for Maccabi Haifa until the middle of 2004/05 season when he moved to Maccabi Tel Aviv for the rest of the season. In 2005, Levi played for Hapoel Kiryat Shmona, but he left in 2006 to play for Maccabi Netanya under the new management of Daniel Jammer and Eyal Berkovic.

Levi left Maccabi Netanya after having disciplinary issues with head coach Eli Guttman. Later that year, he transferred to Hapoel Acre from the Liga Haleumit and signed a 2-year contract with Hapoel Haifa a year later.

On June 26, 2013, Levi returned to Maccabi Netanya, signing a 3-year contract worth $370,000. His return also marked the first time in his career that he was appointed team captain. Levi was injured for the entire 2015–16 season as the club got relegated. On June 30, 2016, Levi signed a one-year contract for the 2016–17 season. Levi agreed to cut close to 70% from his salary in order to help the club get back on its feet. On July 29, 2018, Levi was released from his contract with Netanya after on going tension between him and the owner of the club. In 5 years with the club, Levi scored 55 goals and made 47 assists in a total of 142 games in all club competitions. Levi is placed at number 12th in the all time goalscorers of Maccabi Netanya.

In August 2018 Levi returned to Beitar Jerusalem and signed a one-year contract. After a poor half a season with Beitar in which he didn't get along with the manager, Levi moved to Hapoel Katamon Jerusalem on January 17, 2019.

On November 16, 2019, Levi joined Hapoel Umm al-Fahm, but left the club on December 27, 2019, and joined Hapoel Afula for the rest of the season.

On August 11, 2020, Levi joined Liga Alef side Hapoel Marmorek.

On July 5, 2021, Levi joined Maccabi Kabilio Jaffa, and took part in the team's promotion to the Liga Leumit at the end of the 2021/22 season. On June 1, 2022, he extended his contract for another year.

On October 3, 2022, Levi signed for Liga Alef side Hapoel Ra'anana.

== Honours ==
- Israeli Premier League
  - Winner (1): 2003–04
- Toto Cup
  - Winner (1): 2002–03
- Liga Leumit
  - Winner (3): 2008–09, 2013–14, 2016–17
- Israel State Cup
  - Runner-up (1): 2014
- Israeli Premier League Top Assist Provider (1): 2017-18
