= Evyatar Iluz =

Israeli footballer

Evyatar Iluz אביתר אילוז
Personal information
- Full name: Evyatar Iluz
- Date of birth: 4 November 1983 (age 42)
- Place of birth: Beersheba, Israel
- Height: 1.73 m (5 ft 8 in)
- Position: Right back

Youth career
- Hapoel Be'er Sheva

Senior career*
Years	Team	Apps	(Gls)
2001–2005	Hapoel Be'er Sheva	39	(3)
2005–2006	Hapoel Petah Tikva	8	(0)
2006–2015	Hapoel Be'er Sheva	210	(2)

International career^{‡}
2001–2002	Israel U19	1	(0)
2004–2005	Israel U21	5	(0)
- * Club domestic league appearances and goals as of 3 April 2016 (UTC) ‡ National team caps and goals as of 3 April 2016 (UTC)

Evyatar Iluz (Hebrew: אביתר אילוז; born 4 November 1983 in Be'er Sheva), also known as Evya, is an Israeli former professional footballer that has played in Hapoel Be'er Sheva.
