= David Gomez (footballer) =

Brazilian-Israeli footballer

David Gomez דיוויד גומז
Personal information
- Full name: David Gomez Pimenta
- Date of birth: September 5, 1988 (age 38)
- Place of birth: São Paulo, Brazil
- Position: Forward

Team information
- Current team: Bnei Jaljulia

Senior career*
Years	Team	Apps	(Gls)
2008–2010	Beitar Jerusalem	5	(0)
2008–2009	→ Hapoel Jerusalem (loan)	15	(5)
2009–2010	Maccabi Netanya	16	(2)
2010–2012	Hapoel Rishon LeZion	53	(19)
2012–2013	Hapoel Acre	15	(1)
2013–2014	Hapoel Petah Tikva	50	(11)
2014–2015	Maccabi Ahi Nazareth	24	(1)
2015	Hapoel Afula	15	(1)
2015–2016	Maccabi Sha'arayim	17	(2)
2016–2018	Ironi Nesher	23	(3)
2018–2019	Nordia Jerusalem	24	(3)
2019	Beitar Kfar Saba	7	(2)
2019–2020	Hapoel Qalansawe	4	(0)
2020	Shimshon Tel Aviv	9	(2)
2021	Maccabi HaShikma Ramat Hen	12	(7)
2022	Maccabi HaSharon Netanya	1	(0)
2025–	Bnei Jaljulia	6	(0)
- * Club domestic league appearances and goals as of 1 June 2025

David Gomez Pimenta (Hebrew: דיוויד גומז; born September 5, 1988, in São Paulo) is a Brazilian-Israeli association football player who currently plays for Bnei Jaljulia in Liga Bet.

== Honours ==
- Liga Leumit:
  - Runner-up (2): 2010–11, 2013–14
- Liga Alef:
  - Winner (1): 2015-16
