= Tzahi Ilos =

Israeli footballer

Tzahi Ilos צחי אילוס
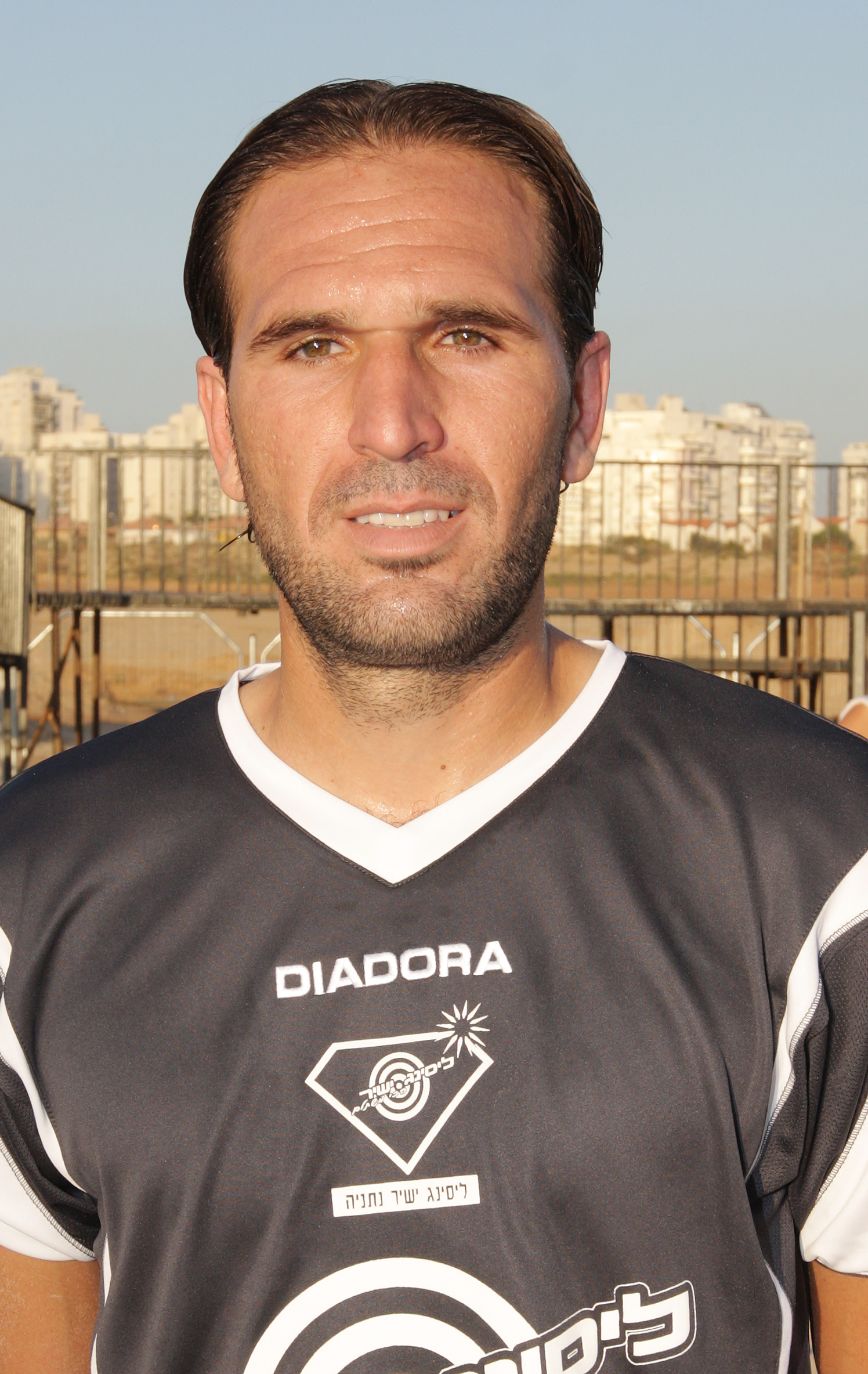

Personal information
- Date of birth: August 13, 1978 (age 48)
- Place of birth: Hadera, Israel
- Height: 1.83 m (6 ft 0 in)
- Position: Forward

Youth career
- Maccabi Haifa

Senior career*
Years	Team	Apps	(Gls)
1997–1998	Hapoel Haifa		
1998–1999	Hakoah Ramat Gan		
1999–2000	Hapoel Hadera		
2000–2001	Ironi Kiryat Shmona		
2001–2002	Maccabi Netanya	29	(5)
2002–2003	Hapoel Haifa	27	(4)
2003–2004	Hapoel Tzafririm Holon		
2004–2006	Hakoah Maccabi Ramat Gan		
2006	→ Maccabi Kafr Kanna		
2006–2007	Maccabi Ironi Nahariya	11	(0)
2007	Maccabi HaShikman Ramat Hen	10	(0)
2007–2008	Maccabi Ironi Kfar Yona	16	(0)
2008–2009	Maccabi Kafr Qara	14	(2)
2010	Hapoel Hadera	4	(0)
2011–2012	Hadera F.C. (indoor)	16	(39)

International career
1995–1997	Israel U-19	?	(?)
2007–2013	Israel (beach soccer)	37	(65)

Managerial career
- 2007–2010: Beitar Nes Tubruk (U-17 gifted class)
- 2009–2010: Israel (beach soccer)
- 2010–2012: Maccabi Haifa (U15)
- 2012–2014: Hadera F.C. (indoor)
- 2014–2015: F.C. Givat Olga
- 2015–2016: Hapoel Baqa al-Gharbiyye
- 2016–2018: F.C. Kafr Kanna
- 2018–2019: Hapoel Hadera (U19)
- 2020–2021: F.C. Holon Yermiyahu
- * Club domestic league appearances and goals

Tzahi Ilos (Hebrew: צחי אילוס; born August 13, 1978, in Hadera, Israel) is a retired footballer. Ilos is the captain of the Israel national beach soccer team and he also was the coach of the national side.

== Sports career ==
Ilos started his career in Maccabi Haifa as a youth player but never played in the senior team. He moved to Hapoel Haifa in the Old Liga Leumit and went to play in small teams in the lower levels of the Israeli football league system, among them Hakoah Maccabi Ramat Gan, Hapoel Hadera, Ironi Kiryat Shmona.

After 3 years in the lower levels he got signed by Maccabi Netanya and returned to the top division of Israel. After a year and a half in Maccabi Netanya he returned to Hapoel Haifa and after one season in Hapoel Haifa he returned to play in the lower levels in Israel.

In the summer of 2007 Ilos became the biggest name in the Israel Beach Soccer League and also got to be the captain of the Israel national beach soccer team. Ilos had an unsuccessful trial with the top Czech football club Sparta Prague.

== Honors ==
=== Team ===
- Israel Beach Soccer League: 2007 – With Netanya Diamonds

With the Israel national beach soccer team:

- Diamonds Tournament: 2007 – 1st place
- Challenge Cup: 2008 – 1st place

=== Individual ===
- Israeli Indoor League - 2011-12 Top goalscorer (with 39 goals)

== See also ==
- Sports in Israel
