= Adam Lam =

Israeli footballer

Adam Lam אדם לם
Personal information
- Full name: Adam Lam
- Date of birth: September 11, 1987 (age 39)
- Place of birth: Netanya, Israel
- Position: Left back

Team information
- Current team: Hapoel Ra'anana (manager)

Youth career
- Maccabi Netanya

Senior career*
Years	Team	Apps	(Gls)
2006–2007	Maccabi Netanya	0	(0)
2007–2008	Hapoel Hadera	21	(2)
2008–2009	Hapoel Kfar Shalem	98	(5)
2009–2013	Maccabi Ironi Kfar Yona	4	(0)
2013	Maccabi Sha'arayim	4	(0)
2013–2014	Maccabi Ironi Kfar Yona	25	(0)
2014	F.C. Givat Olga	12	(4)
2015	Hapoel Beit She'an	8	(0)
2015–2016	Hapoel Pardesiya	25	(3)
2016–2018	Maccabi HaSharon Netanya	109	(6)
2018–2019	Maccabi Ironi Kfar Yona		
2019–2023	Maccabi HaSharon Netanya		

International career
2007–2023	Israel (beach)	17	(2)

Managerial career
- 2018–2019: Bnot Netanya
- 2022–2023: Maccabi HaSharon Netanya
- 2023–2025: Hapoel Kfar Saba U19
- 2025–2026: Hapoel Kfar Saba U19
- 2026: Hapoel Kfar Saba
- 2026–: Hapoel Ra'anana
- * Club domestic league appearances and goals

Adam Lam (Hebrew: אדם לם; born September 11, 1987) is an Israeli retired footballer who now works as the manager of Hapoel Ra'anana in Liga Leumit.

He is the son of Benyamin Lam.
