= Israel national beach soccer team =

Israel
- Association: Israel Football Association
- Confederation: UEFA (Europe)
- Head coach: Mamon Amer
- Captain: Tzahi Ilos
- Most caps: Tzahi Ilos (37)
- Top scorer: Tzahi Ilos (96)
- Home stadium: "Arena Ido Keren" Stadium, Poleg Beach, Netanya.
- FIFA code: ISR
- BSWW ranking: NR (6 May 2026)
First colours
Second colours

First international
- England 5 – 6 Israel (Netanya, Israel; 1 June 2007)

Biggest win
- Turkey 4 – 11 Israel (Netanya, Israel; 26 June 2008)

Biggest defeat
- Brazil 11 – 3 Israel (Netanya, Israel; 11 July 2008)

The Israel national beach football team represents Israel in international beach soccer competitions and is controlled by the IFA, the governing body for football in Israel.

== History ==
In June 2007, the Israel Beach Football league was founded. For the opening event, the IFA scheduled a friendly match between Israel's and England's national teams. At the end, Israel won its first match 6–5. Both Alon Mizrahi and Itzik Zohar, former national player for Israel national football team, scored during the first match.

=== 2007 Euro Beach Soccer League qualifiers ===
Later in June 2007, the Israel national team participated in Group B qualifying games of Euro Beach Soccer League in Athens.
Israel lost its first match against Russia 12–13 after penalty shootout. The match ended in a 6–6 draw, and after a scoreless extra time, the teams went to a penalty shootout. Israel's captain, Tzahi Ilos, scored all of Israel's regular time goals.
At the second match of the group stage, Israel surprised the host Greece, and won 2–1. Tzahi Ilos scored the winning goal on the third period.
At the end, Israel finished second in the group, after Russia's 5–1 win against Greece, and didn't qualify to the 2007 Euro Beach Soccer League. Israel's captain, Tzahi Ilos, won the MVP and top scorers awards.

=== Diamonds tournament ===
In August 2007 the first ever Pro Beach Soccer Tour "Diamonds Tournament" was held in Netanya, Israel. Four teams: Germany, Turkey, Israel and France, 3rd in the world at this time, took part.
At the first round, Israel met Turkey, and won 6–3. Tzahi Ilos scored four goals. At the final, Israel met Germany, who surprised France at the semifinals. Israel won 4–3, with Ilos scoring the winning goal 9 minutes to the end.

=== 2008 Challenge Cup ===
In June 2008 the FIFA Beach Soccer Challenge Cup was held in Israel. The six national teams competed to achieve single ticket to Group A of Euro Beach Soccer League. Czech Republic, Germany, Hungary, Norway, Turkey and the host Israel took part.
Israel, as the host, and Germany, as first seeded, were exempted from the quarterfinals, and played a friendly match in the first match day. Israel defeated Germany for the second time in history, 6–4 after 36 minutes.
At the semifinals, Israel met Turkey. Israel had no problems, and defeated Turkey 11–4. Tzahi Ilos scored five goals and Eran Levi, in his debut, scored two goals.
At the final, Israel met Germany for the second time in three days, and won again. Israel won 4–3, after already leading 4–1 at the third period. Shaul Mimon scored two goals, with Tzahi Ilos and Eran Levi adding one goal each. Eran Levi won the MVP award, and Tzahi Ilos won the top scorer award.

=== Israel vs. Brazil ===
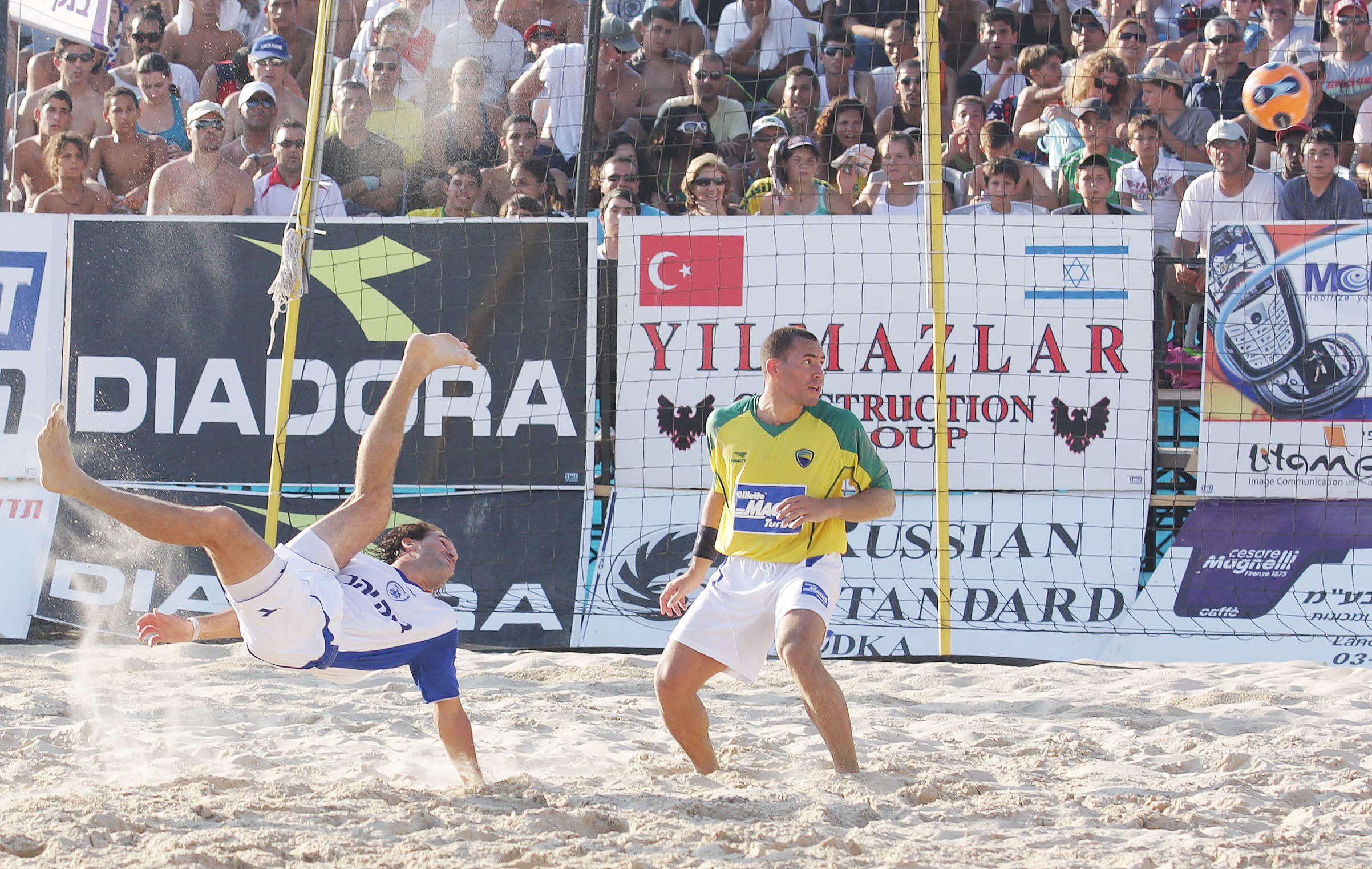
Tzahi Ilos scores against Brazil

On 11 July 2008, Israel played a friendly match against the world champions Brazil, as part of Israel's 60th anniversary celebrations and Brazil's preparations for the 2008 World Cup.
Israel had an early 2–1 lead, after Tzahi Ilos' bicycle kick and Eran Levi's long shot, but Brazil equalled until the end of the first period. The second period was in Brazil's control, scoring six goals and conceding only one goal from Levi's legs, making it an 8–3 lead. Israel couldn't score in the third period, conceding three goals and eventually losing 11–3.
Buru was the top scorer, scoring four goals, including a hat-trick in just a minute. Benjamin and Bruno scored two goals each, with Júnior Negão, André and Daniel adding one goal each. Eran Levi scored two out of Israel's three, with Ilos adding one goal.

=== 2013 Euro Beach Soccer League qualifiers ===
In June 2013, the Israeli team participated in Stage 2 of Euro Beach Soccer League qualifiers in Terracina. Israel win the first match against Azerbaijan 7–1. Ahmed Yatim (twice), Kobi Badash (twice), Tsahi Iloss (twice) and Adam Lam scored in this match. In the second match against Hungary, Israeli team was defeat by Hungary 3–2. Kobi Badash scored twice in this match.

== Current squad ==
Correct as of 5 July 2019 (Friendly match against Brazil National Stars)

Note: Flags indicate national team as defined under FIFA eligibility rules; some limited exceptions apply. Players may hold more than one non-FIFA nationality.

No.	Pos.	Nation	Player
1	GK		Assaf Raz
2	MF		Or Ilos
3	GK		Guy Salem
4	DF		Alon Levi
5	FW		Muhammad "Noor" Sarsur
6	DF		Yakir Shina
7	MF		Adir Danin
8	MF		Liron Fartook

No.	Pos.	Nation	Player
9	FW		Tzahi Ilos (captain)
10	MF		Amer Yatim
11	FW		Elihay Tzabari
12	MF		Sameh Moreb
13	FW		Sharon Gormezano
17	MF		Nisan Revivo
18	GK		Abdel Rahim Sarsur

Coach: Mamon Amer

== Current staff ==
- Assistant Manager: Liron Fartook
- Team Manager: Nimer Amer
- Goalkeepers Coach: Dani Shoshan
- Fitness Trainer: Eytan Fridman
- Team Doctor: Dr. Michal Goldoirt

== Managers ==
Manager	Years as manager
Benyamin Lam	2007–2009
Tzahi Ilos	2009–2010
Benyamin Lam	2010–2015
Mamon Amer	2017–present

== Participations ==
- EBSL Preliminary Event: Athens, Greece, 2007 – 2nd place in group stage, not promoted.
- Challenge Cup: Netanya, Israel, 2008 – 1st place
- FIFA Beach Soccer World Cup qualification, 2009 – Promoted from group stage
- FIFA Beach Soccer World Cup qualification, 2010 – 3rd place in group stage, not promoted.
- EBSL, 2010 – clinched to final berth, 3rd place in Division B (Promotional Final).

== See also ==
- Beach Soccer in Israel
- Israel national football team
